= 2010–11 Adelaide United FC season =

Adelaide United
2010–11 season
- Chairman: Mel Patzwald
- Manager: Rini Coolen
- A-League: 3rd
- AFC Champions League: Round of 16
- A-League Finals: Minor Semi-Final, Week 2
- Top goalscorer: League: Sergio van Dijk (16); All: Sergio van Dijk (19)
- Highest home attendance: 21,083 (vs Melbourne Victory, 11 February 2011)
- Lowest home attendance: 7,370 (vs Melbourne Heart, 20 August 2010)
- Average home league attendance: 11,552
Home colours	Away colours

The 2010–11 Adelaide United FC season was the club's sixth A-League season. It includes the 2010–11 A-League season as well as any other competitions of the 2010–11 football season, including the 2010 AFC Champions League. Adelaide United competed in the continental competition for its third time, making the club the most successful Australian club in Asia.

== Overview ==
For the first time in the club's history, the Adelaide United will be managed by an international manager in Rini Coolen, moving away from the Adelaide United tradition of local coaches seen in its prior seasons.

As of 9 September 2010, Adelaide United has made Australian football history by becoming the first team to climb from the bottom of the table to the top, whilst the 2009–10 premiers and champions, Sydney FC, remain rooted at the bottom. Adelaide United also claimed the record for longest undefeated streak in A-League history with their win over Wellington Phoenix in Week 11 of the league, consisting of thirteen games stretching back to the penultimate round of the 2009–10 A-League season. This surpasses Central Coast Mariners's previous record of twelve games undefeated set back in the 2005–06 A-League season. Unfortunately for Adelaide United, Brisbane Roar surpassed this newly set record, when the Roar comprehensively won their Week 16 fixture against Central Coast Mariners at Bluetongue Stadium.

Following 18 months under Football Federation Australia (FFA) financial administration, it was announced on 8 November 2010 that a South Australian consortium had taken over ownership of the club with a ten-year licence. New co-owner Greg Griffin stepped in as Chairman of the club, whilst North Adelaide Football Club CEO, Glenn Elliott replaced Sam Ciccarello, who then took up a role at the FFA.

During the January 2011 transfer window, Coolen made a move to strengthen United's squad by signing former Uruguayan youth international Francisco Usúcar, and former Dutch international Andwélé Slory. Both have signed until the end of the season and have replaced former imports Lloyd Owusu and Inseob Shin, whose contracts were mutually terminated to allow the transfers to occur early in the year. Cameron Watson was also signed on as a mainstay squad member after his injury replacement contract expired at the end of December. Iain Fyfe, arguably Adelaide's most consistent defender in the season transferred to K-League outfit Busan I'Park for an undisclosed transfer fee, where he will join up with former teammate Shin. As a replacement, Coolen brought in former Croatian youth international Dario Bodrušić to cover in defensive duties.

On 9 January 2011, Adelaide broke its longest winless streak against its rival club Melbourne Victory by posting a 4–1 away win in Melbourne at AAMI Park. Adelaide United then went on to make A-League history by recording the highest winning margin in the league's history with an 8–1 win over North Queensland Fury on 21 January 2011. This also marked the first time two players from the same side scored hat-tricks in one game (Sergio van Dijk and Marcos Flores), and matched the all-time highest match aggregate score of 9 goals scored in one match.

After a form slump in the second half of the season, United saw itself lose 10 of its last 19 games, but rebounded well in the final week of competition by winning 2–1 at Adelaide Oval against Melbourne Victory in front of 21,038 spectators – the club's largest crowd of the season. This ensured the club third place in overall standings at the end of the season, and hosting rights for at least the first week of the knock-out Finals series.

Adelaide United went on to defeat Wellington Phoenix in the first week of the Finals under torrential rain, but succumbed to Gold Coast United in the second week and were knocked out of the competition on the back of a 2–3 home loss.

=== Awards and recognition ===
At the end of the season A-League Awards night, Adelaide midfielder Marcos Flores was awarded the league's most prestigious award, the Johnny Warren Medal. Striker Sergio van Dijk was awarded the league's Golden Boot award, with a total of 17 goals in the season.

Club awards were also presented at the end of the season with defender Cássio awarded his second Club Champion award, edging out teammates Marcos Flores and Sergio van Dijk.

== Players ==
=== Squad information ===
==== First Team ====
Note: Flags indicate national team as defined under FIFA eligibility rules; some limited exceptions apply. Players may hold more than one non-FIFA nationality.

No.	Pos.	Nation	Player
1	GK	AUS	Eugene Galeković
2	DF	AUS	Robert Cornthwaite
3	DF	AUS	Nigel Boogaard
4	DF	AUS	Iain Fyfe
5	DF	AUS	Daniel Mullen (Youth)
6	DF	BRA	Cássio
7	MF	AUS	Lucas Pantelis
8	MF	AUS	Adam Hughes
9	FW	IDN	Sergio van Dijk
10	MF	ARG	Marcos Flores
11	MF	NED	Andwélé Slory (Guest player)
12	MF	AUS	Paul Reid
13	MF	AUS	Travis Dodd (Captain)

No.	Pos.	Nation	Player
14	MF	AUS	Cameron Watson
15	FW	AUS	Francesco Monterosso (Youth)
16	DF	CRO	Dario Bodrušić
17	MF	PHI	Iain Ramsay
18	MF	AUS	Fabian Barbiero
19	MF	AUS	Mathew Leckie (Youth)
20	GK	AUS	Mark Birighitti (Youth)
21	MF	URU	Francisco Usúcar
22	MF	AUS	Osama Malik
23	MF	AUS	Joe Costa (Youth)
26	MF	ENG	Joseph Keenan (Injury replacement player)
29	MF	AUS	Bradley Norton (Youth)

* Squad list current as of 19 January 2011

=== Players in / out ===
Re-signed

Name	Position	Duration	Contract Expiry	Notes
(Australia) Robert Cornthwaite	Defender	3 years	2013	
(Australia) Eugene Galeković	Goalkeeper	4 years	2014	
(Australia) Mark Birighitti	Goalkeeper	2 years	2012	
(Australia) Lucas Pantelis	Midfielder	2 years	2012	

In

Name	Position	Moving from	Notes
(Australia) Nigel Boogaard	Defender	(Australia) Central Coast Mariners	2-year contract
(Argentina) Marcos Flores	Midfielder	(Chile) Curicó Unido	2-year contract
(Indonesia) Sergio van Dijk	Striker	(Australia) Brisbane Roar	6-month contract for ACL; 3-year contract extension
(Philippines) Iain Ramsay	Midfielder	(Australia) Sydney Olympic	1-year contract
(Australia) Cameron Watson	Midfielder	(Australia) Oakleigh Cannons	Injury replacement for Barbiero; Injury replacement for D. Mullen
(England) Joseph Keenan	Midfielder	(Australia) South Melbourne	Injury replacement for Boogaard; 4-week contract; Short-term contract extension to 15 October 2010; 6-week injury replacement contract for Leckie
(Australia) Bradley Norton	Midfielder	(Australia) Northcote City	1 year youth contract; 2-year senior contract
(Uruguay) Francisco Usúcar	Midfielder	(Uruguay) Central Español	Initial 6-month contract, with an option for a 1-year extension
(Netherlands) Andwélé Slory	Midfielder	(Bulgaria) Levski Sofia	Guest player contract for a maximum of 10 games; including Finals.
(Australia) Osama Malik	Midfielder	(Australia) North Queensland Fury	Secured early release to transfer in January 2011
(Croatia) Dario Bodrušić	Defender	(Croatia) Rudeš	Contract until end of season starting January 2011

Out

Name	Position	Moving to	Notes
(Australia) Kristian Sarkies	Midfielder	(Australia) Melbourne Heart	
(Australia) Michael Marrone	Defender	(Australia) Melbourne Heart	
(Australia) Mark Rudan	Defender	Released	
(Brazil) Cristiano	Striker	Released	
(Brazil) Alemão	Defender	Released	
(Australia) Scott Jamieson	Defender	(Australia) Sydney FC	
(Ghana) Lloyd Owusu	Striker	Released	Mutual termination of contract as of 1 January 2011
(South Korea) Inseob Shin	Midfielder	(South Korea) Busan I'Park	Drafted into the K-League side as of 1 January 2011
(Australia) Iain Fyfe	Defender	(South Korea) Busan I'Park	Transferred during January transfer period; Reported transfer fee of $300,000

== Player statistics ==
=== Squad stats ===
				Total				AFC Champions League		A-League		A-League Finals		
N	Pos.	Name	Nat.	GS	App	Gls	Min	App	Gls	App	Gls	App	Gls	Notes
1	GK	Galeković	(Australia)	36	36	-44	3090	7	-7	27	-34	2	-3	(−) means goals conceded
2	DF	Cornthwaite	(Australia)	23	33	3	2271	8	2	23	1	2		
3	DF	Boogaard	(Australia)	12	14		1115	2		10		2		
5	DF	D. Mullen	(Australia)	15	19	1	1381	6		13	1			
6	DF	Cássio	(Brazil)	33	36	1	2985	6	1	28		2		
7	MF	Pantelis	(Australia)	24	33		2045	6		26		1		
8	MF	Hughes	(Australia)	30	35		2667	4		29		2		
9	FW	van Dijk	(Indonesia)	36	37	19	3107	7	2	28	16	2	1	
10	MF	Flores	(Argentina)	36	36	8	2945	7		27	8	2		
11	MF	Slory	(Netherlands)	3	5		193			3		2		
12	MF	Reid	(Australia)	27	32	2	2424	2		29	2	1		
13	MF	Dodd	(Australia)	22	29	7	2149	7	1	20	5	2	1	
14	MF	Watson	(Australia)	18	28		1725			26		2		
15	FW	Monterosso	(Australia)		3		66	1		2				
16	DF	Bodrušić	(Croatia)	4	4		294			2		2		
17	MF	Ramsay	(Philippines)	14	31	3	1600			30	3	1		
18	MF	Barbiero	(Australia)	11	22	1	1057	6		16	1			
19	MF	Leckie	(Australia)	16	21	7	1252	6	2	13	4	2	1	
20	GK	Birighitti	(Australia)	3	3	-2	270			3	-2			(−) means goals conceded
21	MF	Usúcar	(Uruguay)	7	7		586			6		1		
22	MF	Malik	(Australia)		1		61			1				
23	MF	Costa	(Australia)											
25	MF	M. Mullen	(Australia)		1		27			1				
29	MF	Norton	(Australia)		2		9			2				

Last updated: 28 February 2011
Source: Adelaide United FC
Ordered by shirt number
0 shown as blank

==== Delisted players ====
				Total				AFC Champions League		A-League		A-League Finals		
N	Pos.	Name	Nat.	GS	App	Gls	Min	App	Gls	App	Gls	App	Gls	Notes
	DF	Jamieson	(Australia)	5	6		450	6						Transferred to Sydney FC after ACL 2010
	DF	Marrone	(Australia)	6	7		558	7						Transferred to Melbourne Heart after ACL 2010
	DF	Griffiths	(Australia)	2	3		238	3						Released after ACL 2010
	MF	Shin	(South Korea)	2	8		193			8				Released in January 2011 transfer window
	DF	Fyfe	(Australia)	31	33	4	2891	7		26	4			Released in January 2011 transfer window
	MF	Keenan	(England)	10	17	1	986			17	1			Short term contract ended

Last updated: 31 January 2010
Source: Adelaide United FC
Ordered by shirt number
0 shown as blank

=== Disciplinary records ===
==== A-League ====
N	Pos.	Nat.	Name	Yellow card	Second yellow card	Red card	Notes
1	GK	(Australia)	Galeković	3			
2	DF	(Australia)	Cornthwaite	4		1	One match suspension for Round 22
3	DF	(Australia)	Boogaard	1			
4	DF	(Australia)	Fyfe	4			
5	DF	(Australia)	D. Mullen	1			
6	DF	(Brazil)	Cássio		1		One match suspension for Round 8
7	MF	(Australia)	Pantelis	1			
8	MF	(Australia)	Hughes	6	1		One match suspension for Round 3
9	FW	(Indonesia)	van Dijk	1			
10	MF	(Argentina)	Flores	5			
12	MF	(Australia)	Reid	5			One match suspension for Round 16; Straight red card from Round 28 rescinded by FFA
13	MF	(Australia)	Dodd	2			Straight red card from Round 18 rescinded by FFA
16	DF	(Croatia)	Bodrušić	1			
17	MF	(Philippines)	Ramsay	2			
18	MF	(Australia)	Barbiero	3			
19	MF	(Australia)	Leckie	1			
21	MF	(Uruguay)	Usúcar	1			
26	MF	(England)	Keenan	1			

Last updated: 11 February 2011
Source: Competitive matches
Only competitive matches
(yellow card) = Number of bookings; (second yellow card) = Number of sending offs after a second yellow card; (red card) = Number of sending offs by a direct red card.

==== AFC Champions League ====
N	Pos.	Nat.	Name	Yellow card	Second yellow card	Red card	Notes
2	DF	(Australia)	Cornthwaite	1			
3	DF	(Australia)	Boogaard	1			
4	DF	(Australia)	Fyfe	2			One match suspension for Match Day 5 of ACL 2010
5	DF	(Australia)	D. Mullen	2			One match suspension for Match Day 6 of ACL 2010
6	DF	(Brazil)	Cássio	1	1		
7	MF	(Australia)	Pantelis	2			One match suspension for Match Day 6 of ACL 2010
9	FW	(Indonesia)	van Dijk	1			
10	MF	(Australia)	Hughes	2			One match suspension for Match Day 6 of ACL 2010
13	MF	(Australia)	Dodd	2			
14	DF	(Australia)	Jamieson	1			Transferred to Sydney FC after ACL 2010
17	DF	(Australia)	Marrone	1			Transferred to Melbourne Heart after ACL 2010
19	MF	(Australia)	Leckie	2			One match suspension for Round of 16 match of ACL 2010
27	DF	(Australia)	Griffiths	1			Released after ACL 2010

Last updated: 28 June 2010
Source: Competitive matches
Only competitive matches
(yellow card) = Number of bookings; (second yellow card) = Number of sending offs after a second yellow card; (red card) = Number of sending offs by a direct red card.

=== Scorers ===
==== A-League ====
Total	Player		Goals per Round																													
Total	Player		1	2	3	4	5	6	7	8	9	10	11	12	13	14	15	16	17	18	19	20	21	22	23	24	25	26	27	28	29	30
16	(Indonesia)	Sergio van Dijk					2			2			1			1				1	1	1	1		1		2	3				
8	(Argentina)	Marcos Flores				1		1					1								1						1	3				
5	(Australia)	Travis Dodd											1						1									1	1			1
4	(Australia)	Mathew Leckie			1		1	1	1																							
4	(Australia)	Iain Fyfe		1										1		1	1															
4	(Philippines)	Iain Ramsay			2						1																	1				
2	(Australia)	Paul Reid																	1													1
1	(Australia)	Daniel Mullen				1																										
1	(Australia)	Robert Cornthwaite																1														
1	(England)	Joseph Keenan																					1									
1	(Australia)	Fabian Barbiero																									1					

A goal was scored from a penalty kick
Two goals were scored from penalty kicks

==== AFC Champions League ====
Total	Player		Goals per Round						
Total	Player		MD1	MD2	MD3	MD4	MD5	MD6	R16
2	(Australia)	Mathew Leckie	1	1					
2	(Indonesia)	Sergio van Dijk		1					1
2	(Australia)	Robert Cornthwaite			1				1
1	(Australia)	Travis Dodd			1				
1	(Brazil)	Cássio			1				

A goal was scored from a penalty kick
Two goals were scored from penalty kicks

== Club ==
=== Coaching staff ===
Position	Staff
Manager (Head Coach)	(Netherlands) Rini Coolen
Assistant coach	(Australia) Phil Stubbins
Specialist coach	(Australia) Carl Veart
Goalkeeper coach	(Australia) Peter Blazincic

Last updated: 5 July 2010
Source: Adelaide United FC

=== Managerial Changes ===
Outgoing manager	Manner of departure	Date of vacancy	Table	Incoming manager	Date of appointment	Table
(Australia) Aurelio Vidmar	Promoted to Olyroos coach & Socceroos assistant coach	3 June 2010	10th (09–10)	(Netherlands) Rini Coolen	5 July 2010	Pre-season

=== Attendance at home games ===
Round	Date	Opponent	Score AUFC – Away	Attendance	Weekday
1	6 August 2010	Newcastle Jets	0–0	8,479	Friday
3	20 August 2010	Melbourne Heart	3–2	7,370	Friday
6	11 September 2010	Newcastle Jets	2–1	9,571	Saturday
8	24 September 2010	Perth Glory	2–0	13,310	Friday
11	22 October 2010	Wellington Phoenix	3–0	11,206	Friday
14	10 November 2010	Perth Glory	2–0	10,023	Wednesday
17	26 November 2010	Gold Coast United	2–1	12,005	Friday
19	10 December 2010	North Queensland Fury	2–0	8,786	Friday
20	17 December 2010	Melbourne Heart	1–2	10,011	Friday
23	29 December 2010	Sydney FC	2–0	16,429	Wednesday
24	2 January 2011	Brisbane Roar	0–1	14,420	Sunday
26	21 January 2011	North Queensland Fury	8–1	10,986	Friday
27	29 January 2011	Central Coast Mariners	1–2	12,109	Saturday
29	5 February 2011	Wellington Phoenix	0–1	7,498	Saturday
30	11 February 2011	Melbourne Victory	2–1	21,083	Friday

== Competitions ==
=== Pre-season ===
18 March 2010	Adelaide United	1–1	Central Coast Mariners	Hindmarsh Stadium, Adelaide
14:00 ACDT	Flores 24'	Report	31' Simon	Attendance: Closed to the public

7 July 2010	Adelaide Galaxy	0–2	Adelaide United	Con Makris Park, Adelaide
19:00 ACST		Report	22' van Dijk; 45' Flores

16 July 2010	Adelaide United	2–0	Wellington Phoenix	Hindmarsh Stadium, Adelaide
19:30 ACST	van Dijk 48'; Pantelis 76'	Report	(yellow card) 44' Diego	Attendance: 1,516; Referee: Stephen Toth

23 July 2010	Adelaide United	1–3	Perth Glory	Hindmarsh Stadium, Adelaide
19:30 ACST	Fyfe (yellow card) 52' van Dijk 77'	Report	17' Jelić; (yellow card) 40' (goal) 86' 89' Baird	Attendance: 1,833; Referee: Stephen Toth

30 July 2010	North Queensland Fury	1–0	Adelaide United	Brolga Park, Townsville
19:00 ACST	Casey 70'	Report		Referee: Chris Beath

=== A-League ===
Pos	Team	Pld	W	D	L	GF	GA	GD	Pts	Qualification
1	Brisbane Roar (C)	30	18	11	1	58	26	+32	65	Qualification for 2012 AFC Champions League group stage and Finals series (Note: First place qualifies for the 2012 AFC Champions League group stage. Winning the 2011 A-League Grand Final automatically earns qualification for the 2012 AFC Champions League group stage, unless first place are champions. Second place qualifies for the 2012 AFC Champions League qualifying play-off, unless they qualify for the 2011 A-League Grand Final alongside first place or become A-League Champions, subsequently third place then qualify for the 2012 AFC Champions League qualifying play-off.)
2	Central Coast Mariners	30	16	9	5	50	31	+19	57	Qualification for 2012 AFC Champions League group stage and Finals series
3	Adelaide United	30	15	5	10	51	36	+15	50	Qualification for 2012 AFC Champions League qualifying play-off and Finals series
4	Gold Coast United	30	12	10	8	40	32	+8	46	Qualification for Finals series
5	Melbourne Victory	30	11	10	9	45	39	+6	43	Qualification for Finals series
6	Wellington Phoenix	30	12	5	13	39	41	−2	41	Qualification for Finals series
7	Newcastle Jets	30	9	8	13	29	33	−4	35	
8	Melbourne Heart	30	8	11	11	32	42	−10	35	
9	Sydney FC	30	8	10	12	35	40	−5	34	
10	Perth Glory	30	5	8	17	27	54	−27	23	
11	North Queensland Fury	30	4	7	19	28	60	−32	19	

Source: ultimatealeague.com
Rules for classification: 1) points; 2) goal difference; 3) number of goals scored.
(C) Champions

==== Results summary ====
Overall								Home						Away					
Pld	W	D	L	GF	GA	GD	Pts	W	D	L	GF	GA	GD	W	D	L	GF	GA	GD
30	15	5	10	51	36	+15	50	10	1	4	30	12	+18	5	4	6	21	24	−3

Last updated: 11 February 2011.
Source: Competitive Matches

==== Results by round ====
Round	1	2	3	4	5	6	7	8	9	10	11	12	13	14	15	16	17	18	19	20	21	22	23	24	25	26	27	28	29	30
Ground	H	A	H	A	A	H	A	H	A	A	H	A	A	H	A	A	H	A	H	H	A	A	H	H	A	H	H	A	H	H
Result	D	D	W	W	W	W	D	W	W	D	W	L	L	W	L	W	W	L	W	L	L	L	W	L	W	W	L	D	L	W
Position	6	5	3	2	1	1	1	1	1	1	1	2	2	2	2	2	2	2	2	2	2	2	2	2	2	3	3	3	3	3

Updated to match(es) played on 11 February 2011. Source: Competitive Matches
A = Away; H = Home; W = Win; D = Draw; L = Loss

==== Matches ====
6 August 2010 Round 1	Adelaide United	0–0	Newcastle Jets	Hindmarsh Stadium, Adelaide
Friday 19:30	Leckie (yellow card) 43'; Reid (yellow card) 44'	Report; Summary	(yellow card) 75' Wehrman	Attendance: 8,479; Referee: Gerard Parsons

15 August 2010 Round 2	Central Coast Mariners	1–1	Adelaide United	Bluetongue Stadium, Gosford
Sunday 14:30	Rose (yellow card) 18'; Zwaanswijk (yellow card) 70'; Simon 84'; Bozanic (yellow card) 90+4'	Report; Summary	(yellow card) 15' (yellow-red card) 86' Hughes; (yellow card) 36' Mullen; 45+1' Fyfe; (yellow card) 87' Galeković	Attendance: 8,447; Referee: Kris Griffith-Jones

20 August 2010 Round 3	Adelaide United	3–2	Melbourne Heart	Hindmarsh Stadium, Adelaide
Friday 19:30	Leckie 2'; Fyfe (yellow card) 5'; Ramsay 52', 88'	Report; Summary	42' (yellow card) 45+1' Worm; (yellow card) 65' Srhoj; 74' Babalj; (yellow card) 75' Hoffman; (yellow card) 84' Beauchamp	Attendance: 7,370; Referee: Ben Williams

28 August 2010 Round 4	North Queensland Fury	2–3	Adelaide United	Dairy Farmers Stadium, Townsville
Saturday 16:45	Cernak 7'; Malik (yellow card) 46'; Williams 87'	Report; Summary	22' Flores; 50' (o.g.) Studman; 56' D. Mullen; (yellow card) 84' Ramsay	Attendance: 6,130; Referee: Peter Green

4 September 2010 Round 5	Sydney FC	1–3	Adelaide United	Sydney Football Stadium, Sydney
Saturday 19:00	Keller 58'	Report; Summary	9', 53' van Dijk; (yellow card) 22' Hughes; 37' Leckie; (yellow card) 58' Fyfe	Attendance: 7,557; Referee: Peter Green

11 September 2010 Round 6	Adelaide United	2–1	Newcastle Jets	Hindmarsh Stadium, Adelaide
Saturday 19:00	Leckie 23'; Flores 66'	Report; Summary	(yellow card) 28' Miličević; 90' Rooney	Attendance: 9,571; Referee: Ben Williams

18 September 2010 Round 7	Brisbane Roar	1–1	Adelaide United	Suncorp Stadium, Brisbane
Saturday 19:00	Broich 34'; Paartalu (yellow card) 52'	Report; Summary	27' Leckie; (yellow card) 79' Fyfe; (yellow card) 87' Galeković; (yellow card) 45' (yellow-red card) 87' Cássio	Attendance: 7,080; Referee: Ben Williams

24 September 2010 Round 8	Adelaide United	2–0	Perth Glory	Hindmarsh Stadium, Adelaide
Friday 19:30	Cornthwaite (yellow card) 44'; Reid (yellow card) 65' van Dijk 70', 73' (pen.)	Report; Summary	(yellow card) 73' Velaphi; (yellow card) 38' (yellow-red card) 75' J. Coyne	Attendance: 13,310; Referee: Matthew Breeze

4 October 2010 Round 9	Sydney FC	1–2	Adelaide United	Sydney Football Stadium, Sydney
Monday 16:30	Brosque 40' (pen.); Jamieson (yellow card) 52'	Report; Summary	(yellow card) 39' Hughes; 56' (o.g.) Cole; 90+1' Ramsay	Attendance: 7,071; Referee: Gerard Parsons

17 October 2010 Round 10	Gold Coast United	0–0	Adelaide United	Skilled Park, Robina
Sunday 16:30		Report; Summary		Attendance: 2,389; Referee: Chris Beath

22 October 2010 Round 11	Adelaide United	3–0	Wellington Phoenix	Hindmarsh Stadium, Adelaide
Friday 19:30	Cornthwaite (yellow card) 47' van Dijk 71'; Flores 72'; Dodd 77' (yellow card) 77'; Hughes (yellow card) 81'	Report; Summary	(yellow card) 30' Brown	Attendance: 11,206; Referee: Alan Milliner

29 October 2010 Round 12	Melbourne Victory	2–1	Adelaide United	Etihad Stadium, Melbourne
Friday 19:30	Kruse 22'; Muscat (yellow card) 33'; Hernández 68'; Broxham (yellow card) 85'	Report; Summary	2' Fyfe; (yellow card) 36' Barbiero; (yellow card) 76' Reid; (yellow card) 90+1' Hughes; (yellow card) 90+2' Pantelis	Attendance: 16,269; Referee: Ben Williams

6 November 2010 Round 13	Brisbane Roar	4–0	Adelaide United	Suncorp Stadium, Brisbane
Saturday 20:45	Reinaldo 43' (yellow card) 45+2' (yellow-red card) 54'; Smith 56'; Barbarouses 62', 67'	Report; Summary	(yellow card) 53' Cornthwaite	Attendance: 13,248; Referee: Matthew Breeze

10 November 2010 Round 14	Adelaide United	2–0	Perth Glory	Hindmarsh Stadium, Adelaide
Wednesday 18:30	Flores (yellow card) 25'; Reid (yellow card) 55'; Fyfe 64' van Dijk 90+2'	Report; Summary	(yellow card) 17' Todd; (yellow card) 29' Pellegrino; (yellow card) 45' (yellow-red card) 63' Sekulovski; (yellow card) 45+5' Neville; (yellow card) 63' McGarry; (yellow card) 90+4' B. Griffiths	Attendance: 10,023; Referee: Ryan Shepheard

13 November 2010 Round 15	Newcastle Jets	3–1	Adelaide United	EnergyAustralia Stadium, Newcastle
Saturday 19:15	Topo-Stanley 5'; Abbas (yellow card) 5'; Jesic 13' 52' (yellow card) 52'; Miličević (yellow card) 29'	Report; Summary	(yellow card) 50' Reid; 79' Fyfe; (yellow card) 84' Dodd	Attendance: 8,278; Referee: Kurt Ams

19 November 2010 Round 16	Melbourne Heart	0–2	Adelaide United	AAMI Park, Melbourne
Friday 19:30	Worm (yellow card) 36'	Report; Summary	6' Cornthwaite; 73' (o.g.) Bolton; (yellow card) 87' van Dijk	Attendance: 6,538; Referee: Chris Beath

26 November 2010 Round 17	Adelaide United	2–1	Gold Coast United	Hindmarsh Stadium, Adelaide
Friday 19:30	Reid 10'; Dodd 47'	Report; Summary	(yellow card) 16' (yellow-red card) 61' Brown; (yellow card) 28' Djite; 45+2' van den Brink; (yellow card) 73' Djulbic	Attendance: 12,005; Referee: Peter Green

5 December 2010 Round 18	Wellington Phoenix	2–1	Adelaide United	AMI Stadium, Christchurch
Sunday 14:30	Durante (yellow card) 23'; Brown 46'; Greenacre (yellow card) 86'; Ward (yellow card) 87'; Sigmund 90+4'	Report; Summary	14' van Dijk; (yellow card) 38' Flores; (yellow card) 44' Cornthwaite; (red card) 83' Dodd	Attendance: 14,108; Referee: Peter O'Leary

10 December 2010 Round 19	Adelaide United	2–0	North Queensland Fury	Hindmarsh Stadium, Adelaide
Friday 19:30	Flores 5' van Dijk 16'	Report; Summary	(yellow card) 86' Nikas	Attendance: 8,786; Referee: Matthew Gillett

17 December 2010 Round 20	Adelaide United	1–2	Melbourne Heart	Hindmarsh Stadium, Adelaide
Friday 19:30	van Dijk 45+1'; Galeković (yellow card) 89'; Keenan (yellow card) 90+1'	Report; Summary	(yellow card) 27' Thompson; (yellow card) 65' Hoffman; 89' Colosimo; 90+1' Aloisi	Attendance: 10,011; Referee: Ryan Shepheard

22 December 2010 Round 21	Perth Glory	4–2	Adelaide United	nib Stadium, Perth
Wednesday 21:30	J. Coyne 6'; Sterjovski 35' (yellow card) 55'; Sekulovski (yellow card) 37'; McGarry (yellow card) 54'; Fowler 67', 77' (pen.)	Report; Summary	22' Keenan; (yellow card) 43' Fyfe; 51' van Dijk; (red card) 75' Cornthwaite	Attendance: 7,193; Referee: Chris Beath

26 December 2010 Round 22	Central Coast Mariners	2–0	Adelaide United	Bluetongue Stadium, Gosford
Sunday 16:30	Simon 51' (yellow card) 72'; Griffiths (yellow card) 68' van Dijk 78' (o.g.)	Report; Summary	(yellow card) 64' Barbiero; (yellow card) 67' Hughes	Attendance: 6,249; Referee: Ryan Shepheard

29 December 2010 Round 23	Adelaide United	2–0	Sydney FC	Adelaide Oval, Adelaide
Wednesday 19:30	van Dijk 35'; Ramsay (yellow card) 48'; Foxe 58' (o.g.)	Report; Summary		Attendance: 16,429; Referee: Gerard Parsons

2 January 2011 Round 24	Adelaide United	0–1	Brisbane Roar	Hindmarsh Stadium, Adelaide
Sunday 18:30	Cornthwaite (yellow card) 90'	Report; Summary	(yellow card) 37' Nichols; (yellow card) 40' Susak; 69' Solórzano	Attendance: 14,420; Referee: Matthew Breeze

9 January 2011 Round 25	Melbourne Victory	1–4	Adelaide United	AAMI Park, Melbourne
Sunday 14:30	Ricardinho (yellow card) 26'; Muscat (yellow card) 57' (yellow-red card) 65'; Berger (yellow card) 79'; Allsopp (yellow card) 81'; Angulo (yellow card) 87'; Dugandžić 90+4'	Report; Summary	12' (yellow card) 80' Flores; (yellow card) 46' Usúcar; 57', 78' van Dijk; 75' (yellow card) 79' Barbiero	Attendance: 18,558; Referee: Peter Green

21 January 2011 Round 26	Adelaide United	8–1	North Queensland Fury	Hindmarsh Stadium, Adelaide
Friday 19:30	Flores 4', 37', 87'; Dodd 28'; Ramsay 42' van Dijk 46', 67', 83'	Report; Summary	Nikas 71'	Attendance: 10,986; Referee: Peter Green

29 January 2011 Round 27	Adelaide United	1–2	Central Coast Mariners	Hindmarsh Stadium, Adelaide
Saturday 19:00	Flores (yellow card) 55'; Dodd 90+1'	Report; Summary	11' (yellow card) 62' Pérez; 30' Rose; (yellow card) 52' Bojić; (yellow card) 79' Griffiths	Attendance: 12,109; Referee: Strebre Delovski

2 February 2011 Round 28	Gold Coast United	0–0	Adelaide United	Skilled Park, Robina
Wednesday 20:30	Perchtold (yellow card) 33'	Report; Summary	(yellow card) 37' Hughes; (red card) 81' Reid	Attendance: 2,138; Referee: Chris Beath

5 February 2011 Round 29	Adelaide United	0–1	Wellington Phoenix	Hindmarsh Stadium, Adelaide
Saturday 18:30		Report; Summary	34' Greenacre; (yellow card) 42' Brown; (yellow card) 64' Hearfield; (yellow card) 81' Durante; (yellow card) 87' Macallister	Attendance: 7,498; Referee: Matthew Breeze

11 February 2011 Round 30	Adelaide United	2–1	Melbourne Victory	Adelaide Oval, Adelaide
Friday 19:30	Reid 6'; Bodrušić (yellow card) 62'; Boogaard (yellow card) 65'; Dodd 78'; Flores (yellow card) 88'	Report; Summary	65' Thompson; (yellow card) 70' Kruse	Attendance: 21,083; Referee: Ryan Shepheard

==== Finals Series ====
18 February 2011 Finals Week 1	Adelaide United	1–0	Wellington Phoenix	Hindmarsh Stadium, Adelaide
Friday 19:30	Watson (yellow card) 23'; Flores (yellow card) 37'; Dodd 70'	Report; Summary	(yellow card) 4' M. Muscat; (yellow card) 30' Ward	Attendance: 10,285; Referee: Jarred Gillett

27 February 2011 Finals Week 2	Adelaide United	2–3	Gold Coast United	Hindmarsh Stadium, Adelaide
Sunday 17:00	van Dijk 56' (pen.); Leckie 70'; Boogaard (yellow card) 77'	Report; Summary	38', 79' (pen.) (yellow card) 45+4' Smeltz; (yellow card) 47' (goal) 71' Djite; (yellow card) 55' van den Brink; (yellow card) 82' Pantelidis	Attendance: 15,028; Referee: Chris Beath
