= List of Adelaide United FC players (1–24 appearances) =

Adelaide United Football Club, an association football club based in Adelaide, South Australia, was founded in 2003. They became the first southern member admitted into the A-League in 2005, having spent their first and last season participating in the National Soccer League. The club's first team have competed in numerous nationally and internationally organised competitions, and all players who have played between 1 and 24 such matches, either as a member of the starting eleven or as a substitute, are listed below.

== Key ==
- The list is ordered first by date of debut, and then if necessary in alphabetical order.
- Appearances as a substitute are included.
- Statistics are correct up to and including the match played on 20 November 2026. Where a player left the club permanently after this date, his statistics are updated to his date of leaving.

Positions key
GK	Goalkeeper
DF	Defender
MF	Midfielder
FW	Forward

Nationality
Unless otherwise noted, the nationality of a player is determined by the country/countries which he has played for, or if said person has not played international football, their country of birth.
Position
Playing positions are listed according to the tactical formations that were employed at the time.
Club career
Club career is defined as the first and last calendar years in which the player appeared for the club in any of the competitions listed below.
Total appearances and Total goals
Total appearances and goals comprise those in the National Soccer League, A-League Men, FFA Cup, Pre-Season Challenge Cup, AFC Champions League and FIFA Club World Cup.

== Players ==
Players highlighted in bold are still actively playing for Adelaide United.

List of Adelaide United players with between 1 and 24 appearances
Player	Nationality	Pos	Club career	Starts	Subs	Total	Goals
Player	Nationality	Pos	Club career	Appearances			Goals
Elias Demourtzidis	Australia	FW	2003–2004	5	7	12	0
Goran Lozanovski	Australia	MF	2003–2004	12	2	14	0
Adriano Pellegrino	Australia	MF	2003–2004	7	10	17	1
Mimi Saric	Australia	FW	2003–2004	5	9	14	2
David Scarsella	Australia	GK	2003–2004	24	0	24	0
David Terminello	Australia	MF	2003–2004	11	8	19	1
Aaron Westervelt	Australia	MF	2003–2004	11	8	19	1
Shane Smeltz	New Zealand	FW	2003–2004	4	3	7	1
Shane Thompson	Australia	MF	2003–2004	8	5	13	1
Nick Budin	Australia	MF	2003–2004	12	7	19	1
Fred Agius	Australia	MF	2004	9	4	13	1
Michael Brooks	Australia	FW	2004	0	8	8	3
Louis Brain	Australia	MF	2005–2006	6	13	19	3
Chad Bugeja	Australia	FW	2005–2006	1	12	13	0
Michael Matricciani	Australia	FW	2006	0	3	3	0
Tony Hatzis	Australia	MF	2006	0	1	1	0
Romário	Brazil	FW	2006	4	0	4	1
Dez Giraldi	Australia	FW	2007–2008	8	11	19	1
Les Anastasiou	Australia	DF	2007	2	0	2	0
Isyan Erdogan	Australia	DF	2007–2009	5	11	16	0
Milan Susak	Australia	DF	2007–2008; 2011	18	5	23	0
Paul Agostino	Australia	FW	2007–2009	16	8	24	4
Shaun Ontong	Australia	DF	2007–2008	1	10	11	0
Tomi Milardovic	Australia	MF	2007	4	1	5	0
Matthew Mullen	Australia	MF	2007–2010	0	4	4	0
Robert Younis	Australia	FW	2008–2009	4	13	17	0
Mark Birighitti	Australia	GK	2008–2012	8	0	8	0
Rostyn Griffiths	Australia	MF	2009	0	2	2	0
Joe Costa	Australia	MF	2009	0	1	1	0
Francesco Monterosso	Australia	FW	2009–2011	0	8	8	0
Lloyd Owusu	Ghana	FW	2009–2010	10	6	16	1
Shin In-seob	South Korea	MF	2009–2010	2	19	21	0
Marko Rudan	Australia	DF	2009–2010	19	0	19	0
Adam Griffiths	Australia	MF	2010	2	2	4	0
Joe Keenan	England	MF	2010–2011	10	7	17	1
Bradley Norton	Australia	DF	2010–2011	0	2	2	0
Andwele Slory	Netherlands	FW	2011	7	4	11	0
Dario Bodrušić	Croatia	DF	2011	4	0	4	0
Spase Dilevski	Australia	DF	2011–2012	7	5	12	1
Evgeniy Levchenko	Ukraine	MF	2011–2012	10	1	11	1
Ricardo da Silva	Australia	MF	2011–2012	1	4	5	0
Teeboy Kamara	Australia	FW	2011–2012	0	4	4	0
Jacob Melling	Australia	MF	2012–2014	1	9	10	0
Daniel Bowles	Australia	DF	2012–2014	20	3	23	1
Jake Barker-Daish	Australia	MF	2012–2014	5	14	19	2
Steven Lustica	Australia	MF	2013–2014	11	4	15	1
Brent McGrath	Australia	FW	2013	1	1	2	0
Michael Zullo	Australia	FW	2013	23	1	24	0
Anthony Costa	Australia	FW	2014–2015	0	2	2	0
Ryan Griffiths	Australia	FW	2014	0	4	4	0
John Hall	Australia	GK	2015–2017	9	2	11	0
Miguel Palanca	Spain	FW	2015	5	9	14	1
Dylan Smith	Australia	MF	2015	0	1	1	0
Eli Babalj	Australia	FW	2015–2016; 2017	3	13	16	2
Mate Dugandzic	Australia	FW	2015–2016	5	16	21	1
Antoni Trimboli	Australia	FW	2015	0	2	2	0
Daniel Margush	Australia	GK	2016–2018	8	0	8	0
Jesse Makarounas	Australia	MF	2016–2017	8	5	13	1
Sergi Guardiola	Spain	FW	2016–2017	14	2	16	3
Henrique	Brazil	FW	2016–2017	12	1	13	3
James Holland	Australia	MF	2016–2017	13	0	13	0
Danny Choi	South Korea	FW	2016	0	2	2	0
Marc Marino	Australia	FW	2016–2017	1	5	6	0
Kim Jae-sung	South Korea	MF	2017	10	3	13	1
Johan Absalonsen	Denmark	FW	2017–2018	13	3	16	8
Karim Matmour	Algeria	MF	2017	8	3	11	0
Ersan Gülüm	Turkey	DF	2017–2018	22	0	22	0
Apostolos Stamatelopoulos	Australia	FW	2017–2019	9	10	19	4
Kristin Konstandopoulos	Australia	FW	2018	0	1	1	0
Pacifique Niyongabire	Burundi	FW	2018–2021	1	23	24	1
Džengis Čavušević	Slovenia	FW	2018	2	2	4	1
Ken Ilsø	Denmark	MF	2018–2019	12	12	24	3
Carlo Armiento	Australia	FW	2018–2019	0	5	5	0
Jordy Thomassen	Netherlands	FW	2019	6	3	9	0
Michaël Maria	Curaçao	DF	2019–2020	21	3	24	0
Kristian Opseth	Norway	FW	2019–2020	15	9	24	6
Isaac Richards	Australia	GK	2019	2	0	2	0
Yared Abetew	Australia	DF	2019–2021	4	5	9	0
James Troisi	Australia	MF	2019–2020	13	0	13	1
Noah Smith	Australia	DF	2020–2021	9	1	10	0
Taras Gomulka	Australia	MF	2020	5	0	5	0
George Timotheou	Australia	DF	2021–2022	19	3	22	0
Jacob Tratt	Australia	DF	2021–2022	15	2	17	1
Arbi Mollas	Albania	MF	2021	0	1	1	0
Steven Hall	Australia	GK	2022–2024	2	2	4	0
Asad Kasumovic	Australia	FW	2022–2023	0	10	10	0
Harry Van der Saag	Australia	DF	2022–2024	12	7	19	2
Musa Toure	Australia	FW	2022–2024	0	11	11	1
Joshua Mori	Australia	FW	2022	0	1	1	0
Giuseppe Bovalina	Australia	DF	2023–2024	18	5	23	1
**Fabian Talladira**	Australia	MF	2023–	10	11	21	0
Jake Porter	Australia	FW	2023	0	1	1	0
**Ethan Cox**	Australia	GK	2024–	8	0	8	0
**Amlani Tatu**	Australia	FW	2024–	2	12	14	0
**Max Vartuli**	Australia	GK	2024–	7	0	7	0
Julian Kwaaitaal	Netherlands	FW	2025–2026	0	1	1	0
**Jake Nadjovski**	Australia	FW	2025–	0	2	2	0
**Joey Garuccio**	Australia	MF	2025–	1	13	14	2
**Anselmo**	Brazil	MF	2025–	11	13	24	2
**Vinko Stanisic**	Australia	DF	2025–	2	1	3	0
**Sotiri Phillis**	Australia	DF	2026–	12	1	13	0
**Ajak Riak**	South Sudan	FW	2026–	2	7	9	0
**Brody Burkitt**	Australia	FW	2026–	10	14	24	5
**Jacob Brazete**	Australia	FW	2026–	1	2	3	0
**Mitchell Smith**	Australia	FW	2026–	2	2	4	0
**Feyzo Kasumović**	Australia	FW	2026–	1	2	3	0
