= 2010–11 A-League =

34th season of top-tier soccer league in Australia

A-League
- Season: 2010–11
- Dates: 5 August 2010 – 13 March 2011
- Champions: Brisbane Roar (1st title)
- Premiers: Brisbane Roar (1st title)
- AFC Champions League: Brisbane Roar; Central Coast Mariners; Adelaide United
- Matches: 165
- Goals: 434 (2.63 per match)
- Top goalscorer: Sergio van Dijk (16 goals)
- Best goalkeeper: Michael Theoklitos
- Biggest home win: Adelaide United 8–1 North Queensland Fury (21 January 2011)
- Biggest away win: Central Coast Mariners 1–5 Brisbane Roar (28 November 2010)
- Highest scoring: Adelaide United 8–1 North Queensland Fury (21 January 2011) (9 goals)
- Highest attendance: 32,231
- Lowest attendance: 1,003
- Average attendance: 8,393 ( 1,403)

The 2010–11 A-League was the 34th season of top-flight soccer in Australia, and the sixth season of the Australian A-League soccer competition since its establishment in 2004. The home and away season began on 5 August 2010 and concluded on 13 February 2011. The addition of Melbourne Heart brought the total number of teams to 11. Brisbane Roar finished Premiers with two games remaining in the season following an Australian record unbeaten run, and later completed the Premiership and Championship double by beating the Central Coast Mariners in the Grand Final.

== Rule changes ==
A new rule at the start of the season allows for two marquee players to be signed without salary cap restraints so long as one is Australian with a certain number of qualifications to be determined by FFA. This replaces the previous ruling of only one salary cap exempt player in previous seasons.

== Clubs ==

Team	City	Home Ground	Capacity
Adelaide United	Adelaide	Hindmarsh Stadium	17,000
Brisbane Roar	Brisbane	Suncorp Stadium	52,500
Central Coast Mariners	Gosford	Bluetongue Stadium	20,119
Gold Coast United	Gold Coast	Skilled Park	27,400
Melbourne Heart	Melbourne	AAMI Park	30,050
Melbourne Victory	Melbourne	AAMI Park; Etihad Stadium	30,050; 56,347
Newcastle Jets	Newcastle	EnergyAustralia Stadium	26,164
North Queensland Fury	Townsville	Dairy Farmers Stadium	26,500
Perth Glory	Perth	NIB Stadium	20,500
Sydney FC	Sydney	Sydney Football Stadium	45,500
Wellington Phoenix	Wellington	Westpac Stadium	36,000

=== Managerial changes ===
Team	Outgoing manager	Manner of departure	Date of vacancy	Table	Incoming manager	Date of appointment
Central Coast Mariners	(Scotland) Lawrie McKinna	Reassigned	9 February 2010	Pre-season	(Australia) Graham Arnold	10 February 2010
Melbourne Heart	Inaugural			Pre-season	(Netherlands) John van 't Schip	12 October 2009
North Queensland Fury	(Scotland) Ian Ferguson	Signed by Perth Glory (assistant)	6 April 2010	Pre-season	(Czech Republic) Frantisek Straka	7 June 2010
Adelaide United	(Australia) Aurelio Vidmar	Sacked	3 June 2010	Pre-season	(Netherlands) Rini Coolen	5 July 2010
Perth Glory	(Australia) David Mitchell	Reassigned, moved to director	12 October 2010	7th	(Scotland) Ian Ferguson	12 October 2010
Melbourne Victory	(Scotland) Ernie Merrick	Sacked	12 March 2011	Postseason	(Australia) Mehmet Durakovic	21 June 2011

=== Foreign players ===
Club	Visa 1	Visa 2	Visa 3	Visa 4	Visa 5	Non-Visa foreigner(s)	Former player(s)
Adelaide United	(Argentina) Marcos Flores	(Brazil) Cássio	(Croatia) Dario Bodrušić	(Indonesia) Sergio van Dijk	(Uruguay) Francisco Usúcar	(England) Joe Keenan^{3} (Netherlands) Andwélé Slory^{4} (Philippines) Iain Ramsay^{2}	(Ghana) Lloyd Owusu (South Korea) Shin In-seob
Brisbane Roar	(Brazil) Henrique	(Costa Rica) Jean Carlos Solórzano	(Germany) Thomas Broich	(New Zealand) Kosta Barbarouses			(Brazil) Reinaldo^{1}
Central Coast Mariners	(Argentina) Patricio Pérez	(Netherlands) Patrick Zwaanswijk	(New Zealand) Michael McGlinchey	(Scotland) Chris Doig		(Malta) John Hutchinson^{2}	
Gold Coast United	(Brazil) Anderson	(Brazil) Robson	(England) John Curtis	(Germany) Peter Perchtold	(Ivory Coast) Adama Traoré	(New Zealand) Glen Moss^{2} (South Korea) Kim Sung-Kil^{4}	(Netherlands) Bas van den Brink
Melbourne Heart	(Brazil) Alex Terra	(Netherlands) Gerald Sibon	(Netherlands) Rutger Worm				
Melbourne Victory	(Brazil) Ricardinho	(Costa Rica) Marvin Angulo	(Costa Rica) Carlos Hernández	(England) Geoff Kellaway	(Thailand) Surat Sukha	(Scotland) Grant Brebner^{1}	
Newcastle Jets	(China) Zhang Shuo	(England) Michael Bridges	(Italy) Marcello Fiorentini	(New Zealand) Jeremy Brockie		(Iraq) Ali Abbas^{1} (Slovenia) Tomislav Mišura^{3}	(England) Francis Jeffers^{4}
North Queensland Fury	(England) Mark Hughes	(Germany) André Kilian	(Netherlands Antilles) Dyron Daal	(Togo) Eric Akoto	(Uganda) Eugene Sseppuya	(Papua New Guinea) Brad McDonald^{2} (Sri Lanka) Jack Hingert^{2}	
Perth Glory	(England) Robbie Fowler	(England) Andy Todd	(Netherlands) Victor Sikora	(Serbia) Branko Jelić	(Scotland) Steven McGarry		
Sydney FC	(Brazil) Bruno Cazarine	(Finland) Juho Mäkelä	(Japan) Hirofumi Moriyasu	(South Korea) Byun Sung-Hwan	(Switzerland) Stephan Keller	(Northern Ireland) Terry McFlynn^{1}	
Wellington Phoenix	(Argentina) Toto Cornejo	(Barbados) Paul Ifill	(Brazil) Daniel	(Brazil) Diego Walsh	(England) Chris Greenacre	(Malta) Manny Muscat^{2}	

The following do not fill a Visa position:
^{1}Those players who were born and started their professional career abroad but have since gained Australian Residency (and New Zealand Residency, in the case of Wellington Phoenix);
^{2}Australian residents (and New Zealand residents, in the case of Wellington Phoenix) who have chosen to represent another national team;
^{3}Injury Replacement Players, or National Team Replacement Players;
^{4}Guest Players (eligible to play a maximum of ten games)

=== Salary cap exemptions and captains ===
Club	Australian Marquee	International Marquee	Junior Marquee	Captain	Vice-Captain
Adelaide United	None	None	None	(Australia) Travis Dodd	(Australia) Lucas Pantelis
Brisbane Roar	None	None	None	(Australia) Matt McKay	(Australia) Shane Stefanutto
Central Coast Mariners	None	None	(Australia) Oliver Bozanic	(Australia) Alex Wilkinson	(Malta) John Hutchinson
Gold Coast United	(Australia) Jason Culina	None	(Australia) Tahj Minniecon	(Australia) Jason Culina	(Australia) Michael Thwaite
Melbourne Heart	(Australia) Josip Skoko	(Netherlands) Gerald Sibon	None	(Australia) Simon Colosimo	None
Melbourne Victory	(Australia) Archie Thompson	(Brazil) Ricardinho (Note: Ricardinho was loaned out to Paraná on 22 March 2011.)	None	(Australia) Kevin Muscat (Australia) Adrian Leijer (Note: Leijer replaced Muscat as captain mid-season, on 16 February 2011 following Muscat's retirement)	(Australia) Adrian Leijer
Newcastle Jets	None	(England) Michael Bridges	None	(England) Michael Bridges	(Australia) Ljubo Milicevic (Australia) Kasey Wehrman
North Queensland Fury	None	None	None	(Australia) Ufuk Talay	(Australia) Gareth Edds
Perth Glory	(Australia) Mile Sterjovski	(England) Robbie Fowler	None	(Australia) Jacob Burns	None
Sydney FC	(Australia) Nick Carle	None	None	(Northern Ireland) Terry McFlynn	(Australia) Alex Brosque (Australia) Hayden Foxe
Wellington Phoenix	(Australia) Jade North	None	None	(New Zealand) Andrew Durante	(New Zealand) Tim Brown

== Regular season ==
=== League table ===
Pos	Team	Pld	W	D	L	GF	GA	GD	Pts	Qualification
1	Brisbane Roar (C)	30	18	11	1	58	26	+32	65	Qualification for 2012 AFC Champions League group stage and Finals series (Note: First place qualifies for the 2012 AFC Champions League group stage. Winning the 2011 A-League Grand Final automatically earns qualification for the 2012 AFC Champions League group stage, unless first place are champions. Second place qualifies for the 2012 AFC Champions League qualifying play-off, unless they qualify for the 2011 A-League Grand Final alongside first place or become A-League Champions, subsequently third place then qualify for the 2012 AFC Champions League qualifying play-off.)
2	Central Coast Mariners	30	16	9	5	50	31	+19	57	Qualification for 2012 AFC Champions League group stage and Finals series
3	Adelaide United	30	15	5	10	51	36	+15	50	Qualification for 2012 AFC Champions League qualifying play-off and Finals series
4	Gold Coast United	30	12	10	8	40	32	+8	46	Qualification for Finals series
5	Melbourne Victory	30	11	10	9	45	39	+6	43	Qualification for Finals series
6	Wellington Phoenix	30	12	5	13	39	41	−2	41	Qualification for Finals series
7	Newcastle Jets	30	9	8	13	29	33	−4	35	
8	Melbourne Heart	30	8	11	11	32	42	−10	35	
9	Sydney FC	30	8	10	12	35	40	−5	34	
10	Perth Glory	30	5	8	17	27	54	−27	23	
11	North Queensland Fury	30	4	7	19	28	60	−32	19	

Source: ultimatealeague.com
Rules for classification: 1) points; 2) goal difference; 3) number of goals scored.
(C) Champions

=== Home and away season ===
The 2010–11 A-League season had each team play 30 matches over 27 rounds. The regular season started on Thursday, 5 August 2010 and ended on Sunday, 13 February 2011. The opening game was played at the new Melbourne Rectangular Stadium (AAMI Park) and marked the A-League debut of the new franchise, Melbourne Heart. Mid week games were played to accommodate this extra team. The official 2010–11 fixture list was released on 18 May 2010.

==== Round 1 ====
5 August 2010	Melbourne Heart	0–1	Central Coast Mariners	AAMI Park, Melbourne
Thursday 19:30 EST		Report; Summary	Wilkinson 16'	Attendance: 11,050; Referee: Chris Beath

6 August 2010	Adelaide United	0–0	Newcastle Jets	Hindmarsh Stadium, Adelaide
Friday 19:30 CST		Report; Summary		Attendance: 8,479; Referee: Gerard Parsons

6 August 2010	Perth Glory	3–3	North Queensland Fury	nib Stadium, Perth
Friday 20:00 WST	Jelić 5'; Neville 74'; Sterjovski 79'	Report; Summary	Payne 34'; Williams 64'; Grossman 90+2'	Attendance: 16,019; Referee: Kevin Docherty

7 August 2010	Sydney FC	3–3	Melbourne Victory	Sydney Football Stadium, Sydney
Saturday 20:00 EST	A. Brosque 36'; McFlynn 53'; Cole 86'	Report; Summary	Broxham 66'; Dugandžić 68'; Celeski 73'	Attendance: 12,106; Referee: Matthew Breeze

8 August 2010	Gold Coast United	0–0	Brisbane Roar	Skilled Park, Gold Coast
Sunday 15:00 EST		Report; Summary		Attendance: 6,394; Referee: Peter Green

==== Round 2 ====
13 August 2010	Wellington Phoenix	3–3	Gold Coast United	Westpac Stadium, Wellington
Friday 19:30 NZST	Ifill 6'; Greenacre 37', 56'	Report; Summary	Smeltz 35', 74'; Culina 88'	Attendance: 8,398; Referee: Peter O'Leary

13 August 2010	Newcastle Jets	1–1	Melbourne Heart	EnergyAustralia Stadium, Newcastle
Friday 20:00 EST	Brockie 60'	Report; Summary	Kantarovski 79' (o.g.)	Attendance: 8,735; Referee: Ryan Shepheard

14 August 2010	North Queensland Fury	2–1	Sydney FC	Dairy Farmers Stadium, Townsville
Saturday 17:15 EST	Grossman 65'; Daal 83'	Report; Summary	Jamieson 82'	Attendance: 5,177; Referee: Peter Green

14 August 2010	Melbourne Victory	0–2	Perth Glory	AAMI Park, Melbourne
Saturday 19:30 EST		Report; Summary	Harnwell 23'; Sterjovski 49'	Attendance: 20,358; Referee: Gerard Parsons

15 August 2010	Central Coast Mariners	1–1	Adelaide United	Bluetongue Stadium, Gosford
Sunday 15:00 EST	Simon 86'	Report; Summary	Fyfe 45+2'	Attendance: 8,447; Referee: Kris Griffiths-Jones

==== Round 3 ====
20 August 2010	Adelaide United	3–2	Melbourne Heart	Hindmarsh Stadium, Adelaide
Friday 19:30 CST	Leckie 2'; Ramsay 52', 88'	Report; Summary	Worm 42'; Babalj 74'	Attendance: 7,370; Referee: Ben Williams

21 August 2010	Perth Glory	1–0	Newcastle Jets	nib Stadium, Perth
Friday 15:15 WST	Jelić 45+1'	Report; Summary		Attendance: 12,031; Referee: Matthew Breeze

21 August 2010	Brisbane Roar	1–0	Sydney FC	Suncorp Stadium, Brisbane
Saturday 19:30 EST	McKay 53'	Report; Summary		Attendance: 10,339; Referee: Chris Beath

22 August 2010	Wellington Phoenix	2–0	Central Coast Mariners	Westpac Stadium, Wellington
Sunday 15:00 NZST	Bertos 10'; Ifill 61'	Report; Summary		Attendance: 9,553; Referee: Peter O'Leary

22 August 2010	Melbourne Victory	2–2	North Queensland Fury	AAMI Park, Melbourne
Sunday 15:00 EST	K. Muscat 30' (pen.), 75' (pen.)	Report; Summary	Sseppuya 16'; Payne 82' (pen.)	Attendance: 13,318; Referee: Chris Boyle (Scotland)

==== Round 4 ====
27 August 2010	Brisbane Roar	1–0	Wellington Phoenix	Suncorp Stadium, Brisbane
Friday 20:00 EST	Barbarouses 73'	Report; Summary		Attendance: 7,339; Referee: Chris Beath

28 August 2010	North Queensland Fury	2–3	Adelaide United	Dairy Farmers Stadium, Townsville
Saturday 17:15 EST	Cernak 7'; Williams 87'	Report; Summary	Flores 22'; Studman 50' (o.g.); D. Mullen 56'	Attendance: 6,130; Referee: Peter Green

28 August 2010	Sydney FC	1–1	Central Coast Mariners	Sydney Football Stadium, Sydney
Saturday 19:30 EST	Grant 47'	Report; Summary	Pérez 73' (pen.)	Attendance: 10,147; Referee: Matthew Breeze

29 August 2010	Gold Coast United	0–1	Melbourne Victory	Skilled Park, Gold Coast
Sunday 15:00 EST		Report; Summary	Kruse 20'	Attendance: 3,624; Referee: Ben Williams

29 August 2010	Melbourne Heart	2–2	Perth Glory	AAMI Park, Melbourne
Sunday 17:00 EST	Sibon 5' (pen.); Kalmar 37'	Report; Summary	Marrone 20' (o.g.); Fowler 90+4' (pen.)	Attendance: 5,878; Referee: Kurt Ams

==== Round 5 ====
3 September 2010	Central Coast Mariners	2–0	Melbourne Victory	Bluetongue Stadium, Gosford
Friday 20:00 EST	Rostyn Griffiths 21'; McBreen 50'	Report; Summary		Attendance: 6,829; Referee: Chris Beath

4 September 2010	Melbourne Heart	1–0	North Queensland Fury	AAMI Park, Melbourne
Saturday 17:15 EST	Kalmar 11'	Report; Summary		Attendance: 4,184; Referee: Gerard Parsons

4 September 2010	Sydney FC	1–3	Adelaide United	Sydney Football Stadium, Sydney
Saturday 19:30 EST	Keller 58'	Report; Summary	van Dijk 9', 53'; Leckie 37'	Attendance: 7,557; Referee: Peter Green

5 September 2010	Newcastle Jets	0–0	Brisbane Roar	EnergyAustralia Stadium, Newcastle
Sunday 15:00 EST		Report; Summary		Attendance: 7,066; Referee: Kris Griffiths-Jones

5 September 2010	Perth Glory	2–1	Wellington Phoenix	nib Stadium, Perth
Sunday 15:00 WST	Sterjovski 6'; Fowler 61'	Report; Summary	Sigmund 73'	Attendance: 10,844; Referee: Ben Williams

==== Round 6 ====
10 September 2010	Central Coast Mariners	1–0	Melbourne Heart	Bluetongue Stadium, Gosford
Friday 20:00 EST	McBreen 20'	Report; Summary		Attendance: 6,326; Referee: Peter Green

11 September 2010	Wellington Phoenix	2–1	Sydney FC	Westpac Stadium, Wellington
Saturday 19:15 NZST	Ifill 50' (pen.); Ward 72'	Report; Summary	Cazarine 67'	Attendance: 8,453; Referee: Chris Beath

11 September 2010	Adelaide United	2–1	Newcastle Jets	Hindmarsh Stadium, Adelaide
Saturday 19:00 CST	Leckie 22'; Flores 65'	Report; Summary	Rooney 89'	Attendance: 9,571; Referee: Ben Williams

12 September 2010	Melbourne Victory	3–0	Brisbane Roar	AAMI Park, Melbourne
Sunday 15:00 EST	Pondeljak 51'; Ricardinho 56'; Brebner 71'	Report; Summary		Attendance: 13,792; Referee: Ryan Shepheard

12 September 2010	Perth Glory	0–1	Gold Coast United	nib Stadium, Perth
Sunday 15:00 WST		Report; Summary	Culina 23'	Attendance: 10,450; Referee: Matthew Breeze

15 September 2010	Melbourne Victory	0–0	Wellington Phoenix	AAMI Park, Melbourne
Wednesday 19:30 EST		Report; Summary		Attendance: 11,513; Referee: Ben Williams

==== Round 7 ====
17 September 2010	Newcastle Jets	2–0	Perth Glory	EnergyAustralia Stadium, Newcastle
Friday 20:00 EST	Bridges 10'; Haliti 89'	Report; Summary		Attendance: 6,977; Referee: Ryan Shepheard

18 September 2010	North Queensland Fury	0–0	Melbourne Victory	Dairy Farmers Stadium, Townsville
Saturday 17:15 EST		Report; Summary		Attendance: 4,922; Referee: Chris Beath

18 September 2010	Brisbane Roar	1–1	Adelaide United	Suncorp Stadium, Brisbane
Saturday 19:30 EST	Broich 35'	Report; Summary	Leckie 28'	Attendance: 7,080; Referee: Ben Williams

19 September 2010	Melbourne Heart	2–1	Wellington Phoenix	AAMI Park, Melbourne
Sunday 15:00 EST	Aloisi 50'; Alex 66'	Report; Summary	Brown 75'	Attendance: 5,698; Referee: Peter Green

19 September 2010	Gold Coast United	0–0	Central Coast Mariners	Skilled Park, Gold Coast
Sunday 17:00 EST		Report; Summary		Attendance: 2,037; Referee: Matthew Gillett

22 September 2010	Gold Coast United	1–0	Newcastle Jets	Skilled Park, Gold Coast
Wednesday 19:30 EST	Curtis 89'	Report; Summary		Attendance: 2,091; Referee: Peter Green

==== Round 8 ====
24 September 2010	Wellington Phoenix	2–1	North Queensland Fury	Westpac Stadium, Wellington
Friday 19:30 NZST	Greenacre 3'; Bertos 13'	Report; Summary	M. Hughes 67'	Attendance: 7,212; Referee: Peter O'Leary

24 September 2010	Adelaide United	2–0	Perth Glory	Hindmarsh Stadium, Adelaide
Friday 19:30 CST	van Dijk 70', 73' (pen.)	Report; Summary		Attendance: 13,310; Referee: Matthew Breeze

25 September 2010	Brisbane Roar	4–0	Melbourne Heart	Suncorp Stadium, Brisbane
Saturday 17:15 EST	Barbarouses 24'; Paartalu 38'; Reinaldo 48' (pen.); Nichols 76'	Report; Summary		Attendance: 6,342; Referee: Chris Boyle (Scotland)

25 September 2010	Newcastle Jets	0–0	Melbourne Victory	EnergyAustralia Stadium, Newcastle
Saturday 19:30 EST		Report; Summary		Attendance: 8,652; Referee: Chris Beath

26 September 2010	Sydney FC	1–1	Gold Coast United	Sydney Football Stadium, Sydney
Sunday 15:00 EST	Cazarine 20'	Report; Summary	Djite 45+1'	Attendance: 9,977; Referee: Ben Williams

29 September 2010	Sydney FC	1–1	North Queensland Fury	Sydney Football Stadium, Sydney
Wednesday 19:30 EST	Cole 37'	Report; Summary	Williams 76'	Attendance: 6,978; Referee: Ryan Shepheard

==== Round 9 ====
1 October 2010	Gold Coast United	3–1	Wellington Phoenix	Skilled Park, Gold Coast
Friday 20:00 EST	Djite 6', 70'; J. Brown 82'	Report; Summary	Ifill 9' (pen.)	Attendance: 2,943; Referee: Matthew Gillett

2 October 2010	Central Coast Mariners	3–2	North Queensland Fury	Bluetongue Stadium, Gosford
Saturday 17:15 EST	Simon 47'; Pérez 57' (pen.); Zwaanswijk 90+1'	Report; Summary	Storey 12'; McBreen 78' (o.g.)	Attendance: 6,656; Referee: Kurt Ams

3 October 2010	Perth Glory	1–2	Brisbane Roar	nib Stadium, Perth
Sunday 17:00 WST	Neville 6'	Report; Summary	Reinaldo 2'; Visconte 90+4'	Attendance: 9,758; Referee: Ben Williams

4 October 2010	Sydney FC	1–2	Adelaide United	Sydney Football Stadium, Sydney
Monday 17:00 EDT	A. Brosque 40' (pen.)	Report; Summary	Cole 57' (o.g.); Ramsay 90+1'	Attendance: 7,071; Referee: Gerard Parsons

8 October 2010 (Note: Game was moved to stop a clash with the AFL grand final replay Archived 4 November 2010 at the Wayback Machine)	Melbourne Heart	2–1	Melbourne Victory	AAMI Park, Melbourne
Friday 19:30 EDT	Aloisi 11'; Alex 48'	Report; Summary	Kruse 37'	Attendance: 25,897; Referee: Ben Williams

==== Round 10 ====
15 October 2010	North Queensland Fury	2–1	Perth Glory	Dairy Farmers Stadium, Townsville
Friday 19:30 EST	Payne 16'; Williams 72'	Report; Summary	Baird 22'	Attendance: 4,011; Referee: Gerard Parsons

16 October 2010	Melbourne Victory	3–0	Sydney FC	Etihad Stadium, Melbourne
Saturday 18:45 EDT	Vargas 20'; Hernández 49'; Kruse 90'	Report; Summary		Attendance: 17,299; Referee: Ben Williams

16 October 2010	Brisbane Roar	1–1	Newcastle Jets	Suncorp Stadium, Brisbane
Saturday 19:45 EST	Reinaldo 77'	Report; Summary	M. Smith 18' (o.g.)	Attendance: 10,191; Referee: Jarred Gillett

17 October 2010	Wellington Phoenix	2–2	Melbourne Heart	Westpac Stadium, Wellington
Sunday 17:00 NZDT	Greenacre 6'; Bertos 59'	Report; Summary	Aloisi 14' (pen.); M. Thompson 36'	Attendance: 5,211; Referee: Matthew Breeze

17 October 2010	Gold Coast United	0–0	Adelaide United	Skilled Park, Gold Coast
Sunday 16:00 EST		Report; Summary		Attendance: 2,389; Referee: Chris Beath

20 October 2010	Brisbane Roar	2–0	Central Coast Mariners	Suncorp Stadium, Brisbane
Wednesday 19:00 EST	Broich 21'; I. Franjic 61'	Report; Summary		Attendance: 5,051; Referee: Chris Beath

==== Round 11 ====
22 October 2010	Adelaide United	3–0	Wellington Phoenix	Hindmarsh Stadium, Adelaide
Friday 19:30 CDT	van Dijk 70'; Flores 72'; Dodd 76'	Report; Summary		Attendance: 11,206; Referee: Alan Milliner

23 October 2010	Melbourne Heart	0–0	Gold Coast United	AAMI Park, Melbourne
Saturday 19:00 EDT		Report; Summary		Attendance: 6,105; Referee: Chris Beath

23 October 2010	Brisbane Roar	2–1	Melbourne Victory	Suncorp Stadium, Brisbane
Saturday 20:15 EST	Nichols 26'; Solórzano 77'	Report; Summary	Kruse 48'	Attendance: 9,425; Referee: Peter Green

24 October 2010	Perth Glory	0–3	Sydney FC	nib Stadium, Perth
Sunday 16:00 WST		Report; Summary	Cazarine 25', 78'; A. Brosque 53'	Attendance: 8,870; Referee: Ben Williams

==== Round 12 ====
29 October 2010	Melbourne Victory	2–1	Adelaide United	Etihad Stadium, Melbourne
Friday 20:00 EDT	Kruse 22'; Hernández 68'	Report; Summary	Fyfe 2'	Attendance: 16,269; Referee: Ben Williams

30 October 2010	Sydney FC	1–1	Brisbane Roar	Sydney Football Stadium, Sydney
Saturday 17:15 EDT	A. Brosque 34'	Report; Summary	DeVere 8'	Referee: Peter Green

30 October 2010	Central Coast Mariners	5–0	Perth Glory	Sydney Football Stadium, Sydney
Saturday 19:30 EDT	Rostyn Griffiths 37'; Simon 60'; Kwasnik 78'; Lewis 87'; Sekulovski 90' (o.g.)	Report; Summary		Attendance: 10,746; Referee: Ryan Shepheard

31 October 2010	Newcastle Jets	0–2	Melbourne Heart	Port Macquarie Regional Stadium, Port Macquarie
Sunday 15:00 EDT		Report; Summary	Kalmar 53'; Sibon 90+4' (pen.)	Attendance: 3,114; Referee: Kris Griffiths-Jones

31 October 2010	North Queensland Fury	1–2	Gold Coast United	Dairy Farmers Stadium, Townsville
Sunday 17:00 EST	M. Hughes 45'	Report; Summary	Traoré 11'; Djulbic 85'	Attendance: 7,195; Referee: Matthew Breeze

3 November 2010	Wellington Phoenix	1–4	Brisbane Roar	Westpac Stadium, Wellington
Wednesday 19:30 NZDT	T. Brown 37'	Report; Summary	Barbarouses 4'; Broich 45'; Murdocca 76'; Nichols 90+2'	Attendance: 5,529; Referee: Peter O'Leary

3 November 2010	Perth Glory	0–0	Melbourne Heart	nib Stadium, Perth
Wednesday 19:00 WST		Report; Summary		Attendance: 5,745; Referee: Chris Beath

==== Round 13 ====
5 November 2010	North Queensland Fury	0–1	Central Coast Mariners	Dairy Farmers Stadium, Townsville
Friday 19:30 EST		Report; Summary	Zwaanswijk 36'	Attendance: 3,625; Referee: Gerard Parsons

6 November 2010	Melbourne Victory	0–1	Gold Coast United	Etihad Stadium, Melbourne
Saturday 19:00 EDT		Report; Summary	Vargas 55' (o.g.)	Attendance: 15,534; Referee: Peter Green

6 November 2010	Brisbane Roar	4–0	Adelaide United	Suncorp Stadium, Brisbane
Saturday 20:15 EST	Reinaldo 43' { M. Smith 55'; Barbarouses 61', 66'	Report; Summary		Attendance: 13,248; Referee: Matthew Breeze

7 November 2010	Sydney FC	1–0	Newcastle Jets	Sydney Football Stadium, Sydney
Sunday 17:00 EDT	Cazarine 76'	Report; Summary		Attendance: 8,512; Referee: Chris Beath

7 November 2010	Perth Glory	0–1	Wellington Phoenix	nib Stadium, Perth
Sunday 16:00 WST		Report; Summary	T. Brown 1'	Attendance: 6,676; Referee: Kris Griffiths-Jones

10 November 2010	Adelaide United	2–0	Perth Glory	Hindmarsh Stadium, Adelaide
Wednesday 18:30 CDT	Fyfe 64' van Dijk 90+1'	Report; Summary		Attendance: 10,023; Referee: Ryan Shepheard

10 November 2010	North Queensland Fury	2–3	Melbourne Heart	Dairy Farmers Stadium, Townsville
Wednesday 20:00 EST	Daal 12'; Talay 85' (pen.)	Report; Summary	Babalj 50'; Sibon 59'; Zahra 64'	Attendance: 2,866; Referee: Jarred Gillett

==== Round 14 ====
12 November 2010	Gold Coast United	3–1	Sydney FC	Skilled Park, Gold Coast
Friday 19:30 EST	J. Porter 15', 54'; Culina 44'	Report; Summary	Cazarine 58'	Attendance: 2,536; Referee: Kris Griffiths-Jones

13 November 2010	Wellington Phoenix	0–3	Central Coast Mariners	Westpac Stadium, Wellington
Saturday 19:30 NZDT		Report; Summary	Rose 17', 80'; Kwasnik 86'	Attendance: 5,778; Referee: Peter Green

13 November 2010	Newcastle Jets	3–1	Adelaide United	EnergyAustralia Stadium, Newcastle
Saturday 19:45 EDT	Topor-Stanley 4'; Jesic 13', 52'	Report; Summary	Fyfe 79'	Attendance: 8,278; Referee: Kurt Ams

14 November 2010	Melbourne Heart	1–2	Brisbane Roar	AAMI Park, Melbourne
Sunday 17:00 EDT	Sibon 11'	Report; Summary	Barbarouses 65'; Solórzano 88'	Attendance: 7,034; Referee: Ryan Shepheard

14 November 2010	Perth Glory	3–1	Melbourne Victory	nib Stadium, Perth
Sunday 16:00 WST	Fowler 13', 64', 71'	Report; Summary	Dugandžić 79'	Attendance: 6,217; Referee: Chris Beath

17 November 2010	Newcastle Jets	1–1	Brisbane Roar	EnergyAustralia Stadium, Newcastle
Wednesday 19:30 EDT	Kantarovski 54'	Report; Summary	Solórzano 80'	Attendance: 7,829; Referee: Peter Green

18 November 2010	Melbourne Victory	2–2	Central Coast Mariners	AAMI Park, Melbourne
Thursday 19:30 EDT	Vargas 62'; Hernández 64'	Report; Summary	McBreen 29'; Kwasnik 78'	Attendance: 9,674; Referee: Gerard Parsons

==== Round 15 ====
19 November 2010	Melbourne Heart	0–2	Adelaide United	AAMI Park, Melbourne
Friday 20:00 EDT		Report; Summary	Cornthwaite 5'; Bolton 73' (o.g.)	Attendance: 6,538; Referee: Chris Beath

20 November 2010	Newcastle Jets	1–0	Wellington Phoenix	EnergyAustralia Stadium, Newcastle
Saturday 19:00 EDT	Jesic 55'	Report; Summary		Attendance: 12,147; Referee: Gerard Parsons

20 November 2010	Brisbane Roar	1–1	North Queensland Fury	Suncorp Stadium, Brisbane
Saturday 20:15 EST	Franjic 85'	Report; Summary	Edds 9'	Attendance: 10,126; Referee: Alan Milliner

21 November 2010	Sydney FC	2–0	Perth Glory	Parramatta Stadium, Sydney (Note: Game was moved due to resurfacing of Sydney Football Stadium)
Sunday 15:00 EDT	Cole 75'; A. Brosque 81'	Report; Summary		Attendance: 6,654; Referee: Peter Green

21 November 2010	Central Coast Mariners	2–3	Gold Coast United	Bluetongue Stadium, Gosford
Sunday 17:00 EDT	Simon 42'; Kwasnik 71'	Report; Summary	Djulbic 45'; Pantelidis 69'; Barisic 73'	Attendance: 9,732; Referee: Matthew Gillett

24 November 2010	Wellington Phoenix	2–0	Melbourne Heart	Westpac Stadium, Wellington
Wednesday 19:00 NZDT	Ifill 62', 73'	Report; Summary		Attendance: 4,700; Referee: Jarred Gillett

24 November 2010	Newcastle Jets	1–1	Central Coast Mariners	EnergyAustralia Stadium, Newcastle (Note: Game was moved due to an exhibition match between Newcastle Jets and Los Angeles Galaxy which also resulted in the postponement of the F3 Derby.)
Wednesday 19:00 EDT	Petrovski 90+2'	Report; Summary	Simon 49'	Attendance: 7,730; Referee: Matthew Breeze

24 November 2010	Brisbane Roar	3–2	Perth Glory	Suncorp Stadium, Brisbane (Note: Game was moved due to a U2 concert at Suncorp Stadium.)
Wednesday 20:00 EST	Solórzano 41', 76' (pen.); M. Smith 58'	Report; Summary	Fowler 66' (pen.); Pellegrino 83'	Attendance: 6,836; Referee: Matthew Gillett

==== Round 16 ====
26 November 2010	Adelaide United	2–1	Gold Coast United	Hindmarsh Stadium, Adelaide
Friday 19:30 CDT	Reid 10'; T. Dodd 47'	Report; Summary	van den Brink 45+2'	Attendance: 12,005; Referee: Peter Green

27 November 2010	Wellington Phoenix	2–2	Melbourne Victory	Westpac Stadium, Wellington
Saturday 18:00 NZDT	T. Brown 18'; Ifill 84'	Report; Summary	A. Thompson 21'; Kruse 40'	Attendance: 6,475; Referee: Peter O'Leary

27 November 2010	Melbourne Heart	0–0	Sydney FC	AAMI Park, Melbourne
Saturday 20:15 EDT		Report; Summary		Attendance: 5,128; Referee: Alan Milliner

28 November 2010	Central Coast Mariners	1–5	Brisbane Roar	Bluetongue Stadium, Gosford
Sunday 16:00 EDT	Kwasnik 50'	Report; Summary	Solórzano 8', 10'; Nichols 24'; Reinaldo 87'; Wilkinson 89' (o.g.)	Attendance: 5,858; Referee: Ryan Shepheard

28 November 2010	North Queensland Fury	1–1	Perth Glory	Dairy Farmers Stadium, Townsville
Sunday 17:00 EST	M. Hughes 80'	Report; Summary	Fowler 23'	Attendance: 4,491; Referee: Kris Griffiths-Jones

1 December 2010	Sydney FC	3–1	Wellington Phoenix	Sydney Football Stadium, Sydney
Wednesday 19:00 EDT	Gan 14'; Bridge 73'; A. Brosque 76'	Report; Summary	Macallister 83'	Attendance: 4,012; Referee: Gerard Parsons

1 December 2010	Gold Coast United	1–2	North Queensland Fury	Skilled Park, Gold Coast
Wednesday 20:00 EST	Robson 10'	Report; Summary	Williams 28'; Talay 68'	Attendance: 1,714; Referee: Matthew Breeze

==== Round 17 ====
3 December 2010	Melbourne Victory	3–3	Brisbane Roar	AAMI Park, Melbourne
Friday 20:00 EDT	Kruse 63', 77'; A. Thompson 71'	Report; Summary	Kemp 30' (o.g.); Solórzano 45+1'; McKay 90+4'	Attendance: 11,886; Referee: Peter Green

4 December 2010	Central Coast Mariners	4–0	Sydney FC	Bluetongue Stadium, Gosford
Saturday 19:00 EDT	Kwasnik 1', 23'; Simon 5'; Ryall 46' (o.g.)	Report; Summary		Attendance: 7,160; Referee: Matthew Breeze

4 December 2010	North Queensland Fury	0–2	Newcastle Jets	Dairy Farmers Stadium, Townsville
Saturday 20:15 EST		Report; Summary	Topor-Stanley 79'; Petrovski 90+3'	Attendance: 3,573; Referee: Kurt Ams

5 December 2010	Wellington Phoenix	2–1	Adelaide United	AMI Stadium, Christchurch
Sunday 17:00 NZDT	T. Brown 46'; Sigmund 90+4'	Report; Summary	van Dijk 14'	Attendance: 14,108; Referee: Peter O'Leary

5 December 2010	Gold Coast United	3–0	Melbourne Heart	Skilled Park, Gold Coast
Sunday 16:00 EST	van den Brink 41'; Culina 58' (pen.), 77'	Report; Summary		Attendance: 1,658; Referee: Jarred Gillett

8 December 2010	Melbourne Heart	0–2	Newcastle Jets	AAMI Park, Melbourne
Wednesday 19:00 EDT		Report; Summary	Jeffers 12'; Jesic 18'	Attendance: 2,754; Referee: Alan Milliner

==== Round 18 ====
10 December 2010	Adelaide United	2–0	North Queensland Fury	Hindmarsh Stadium, Adelaide
Friday 19:30 CDT	Flores 5' van Dijk 16'	Report; Summary		Attendance: 8,786; Referee: Matthew Gillett

11 December 2010	Melbourne Heart	1–3	Melbourne Victory	AAMI Park, Melbourne
Saturday 19:00 EDT	Sibon 17'	Report; Summary	Kruse 12', 28'; Leijer 54'	Attendance: 23,059; Referee: Chris Beath

11 December 2010	Gold Coast United	2–0	Wellington Phoenix	Skilled Park, Gold Coast
Saturday 20:15 EST	van den Brink 21'; J. Brown 66'	Report; Summary		Attendance: 1,716; Referee: Alan Milliner

12 December 2010	Sydney FC	0–1	Brisbane Roar	Sydney Football Stadium, Sydney
Sunday 17:00 EDT		Report; Summary	Barbarouses 41'	Attendance: 7,554; Referee: Jarred Gillett

12 December 2010	Perth Glory	1–1	Central Coast Mariners	nib Stadium, Perth
Sunday 17:00 WST	Mitchell 4'	Report; Summary	Zwaanswijk 87'	Attendance: 6,536; Referee: Gerard Parsons

15 December 2010	Newcastle Jets	2–0	Gold Coast United	EnergyAustralia Stadium, Newcastle
Wednesday 19:00 EDT	Abbas 77'; Petrovski 82'	Report; Summary		Attendance: 8,046; Referee: Ryan Shepheard

15 December 2010	North Queensland Fury	1–0	Sydney FC	Dairy Farmers Stadium, Townsville
Wednesday 20:00 EST	Talay 71'	Report; Summary		Attendance: 2,761; Referee: Chris Beath

==== Round 19 ====
17 December 2010	Adelaide United	1–2	Melbourne Heart	Hindmarsh Stadium, Adelaide
Friday 19:30 CDT	van Dijk 45+1'	Report; Summary	Colosimo 89'; Aloisi 90+2'	Attendance: 10,011; Referee: Ryan Shepheard

18 December 2010	Wellington Phoenix	4–0	Newcastle Jets	Westpac Stadium, Wellington
Saturday 19:00 NZDT	T. Brown 18'; Rojas 31'; Greenacre 41'; Macallister 88'	Report; Summary		Attendance: 6,053; Referee: Jarred Gillett

18 December 2010	Melbourne Victory	2–0	Perth Glory	AAMI Park, Melbourne
Saturday 19:00 EDT	A. Thompson 45+4'; Vargas 64'	Report; Summary		Attendance: 12,124; Referee: Matthew Breeze

18 December 2010	North Queensland Fury	0–2	Brisbane Roar	Dairy Farmers Stadium, Townsville
Saturday 20:15 EST		Report; Summary	Barbarouses 7', 76'	Attendance: 4,412; Referee: Peter Green

22 December 2010	Central Coast Mariners	1–0	North Queensland Fury	Bluetongue Stadium, Gosford
Wednesday 19:30 EDT	Kwasnik 28'	Report; Summary		Attendance: 5,979; Referee: Ryan Shepheard

22 December 2010	Perth Glory	4–2	Adelaide United	nib Stadium, Perth
Wednesday 19:00 WST	J. Coyne 6'; Sterjovski 35'; Fowler 67', 77' (pen.)	Report; Summary	Keenan 22' van Dijk 51'	Attendance: 7,193; Referee: Chris Beath

==== Round 20 ====
23 December 2010	Sydney FC	0–1	Melbourne Heart	Sydney Football Stadium, Sydney
Thursday 19:00 EDT		Report; Summary	Zahra 86'	Attendance: 6,639; Referee: Ben Williams

26 December 2010	Central Coast Mariners	2–0	Adelaide United	Bluetongue Stadium, Gosford
Sunday 17:00 EDT	Simon 50' van Dijk 78' (o.g.)	Report; Summary		Attendance: 6,249; Referee: Ryan Shepheard

26 December 2010	Brisbane Roar	2–2	Gold Coast United	Suncorp Stadium, Brisbane
Sunday 18:15 EST	Barbarouses 30'; Solórzano 66' (pen.)	Report; Summary	Djulbic 13'; Robson 55'	Attendance: 13,065; Referee: Chris Beath

27 December 2010	Melbourne Victory	2–1	Newcastle Jets	AAMI Park, Melbourne
Monday 18:00 EDT	Hernández 20'; Ricardinho 90'	Report; Summary	Zadkovich 54'	Attendance: 16,378; Referee: Matthew Breeze

27 December 2010	North Queensland Fury	1–1	Wellington Phoenix	Dairy Farmers Stadium, Townsville
Monday 19:15 EST	Payne 12'	Report; Summary	Macallister 76'	Attendance: 5,107; Referee: Jarred Gillett

29 December 2010	Adelaide United	2–0	Sydney FC	Adelaide Oval, Adelaide
Wednesday 19:30 CDT	van Dijk 35'; Foxe 58' (o.g.)	Report; Summary		Attendance: 16,429; Referee: Gerard Parsons

==== Round 21 ====
31 December 2010	Central Coast Mariners	1–2	Melbourne Victory	Bluetongue Stadium, Gosford
Friday 18:00 EDT	Leijer 48' (o.g.)	Report; Summary	Ferreira 85'; Brebner 87'	Attendance: 12,409; Referee: Ben Williams

2 January 2011	Melbourne Heart	2–0	North Queensland Fury	AAMI Park, Melbourne
Sunday 17:00 EDT	Aloisi 58'; Sibon 82'	Report; Summary		Attendance: 6,482; Referee: Peter Green

2 January 2011	Adelaide United	0–1	Brisbane Roar	Hindmarsh Stadium, Adelaide
Sunday 18:30 CDT		Report; Summary	Solórzano 69'	Attendance: 14,420; Referee: Chris Boyle (Scotland)

3 January 2011	Newcastle Jets	1–2	Sydney FC	EnergyAustralia Stadium, Newcastle
Monday 17:00 EDT	Haliti 66'	Report; Summary	Moriyasu 36'; Cazarine 45+1'	Attendance: 12,118; Referee: Matthew Gillett

3 January 2011	Gold Coast United	0–0	Perth Glory	Skilled Park, Gold Coast
Monday 18:00 EST		Report; Summary		Attendance: 2,931; Referee: Peter O'Leary

5 January 2011	Wellington Phoenix	2–0	Melbourne Victory	Westpac Stadium, Wellington
Wednesday 19:30 NZDT	Macallister 67'; Rojas 72'	Report; Summary		Attendance: 9,496; Referee: Chris Beath

==== Round 22 ====
7 January 2011	Brisbane Roar	1–1	Perth Glory	Suncorp Stadium, Brisbane
Friday 19:30 EST	Nichols 63'	Report; Summary	Sterjovski 31'	Attendance: 11,574; Referee: Jarred Gillett

8 January 2011	Sydney FC	2–0	Gold Coast United	Sydney Football Stadium, Sydney
Saturday 19:00 EDT	Petratos 32'; Mäkelä 90+2'	Report; Summary		Attendance: 6,135; Referee: Chris Beath

8 January 2011	North Queensland Fury	1–3	Newcastle Jets	Dairy Farmers Stadium, Townsville
Saturday 20:15 EST	M. Hughes 90+5' (pen.)	Report; Summary	Zadkovich 13'; Haliti 16'; Ryan Griffiths 70'	Attendance: 4,315; Referee: Ryan Shepheard

9 January 2011	Melbourne Victory	1–4	Adelaide United	AAMI Park, Melbourne
Sunday 15:00 EDT	Dugandžić 90+4'	Report; Summary	Flores 12' van Dijk 57', 78'; Barbiero 74'	Attendance: 18,558; Referee: Peter Green

9 January 2011	Central Coast Mariners	1–0	Wellington Phoenix	Bluetongue Stadium, Gosford
Sunday 17:00 EDT	McGlinchey 41'	Report; Summary		Attendance: 6,844; Referee: Matthew Breeze

11 January 2011	Newcastle Jets	1–0	North Queensland Fury	EnergyAustralia Stadium, Newcastle
Tuesday 7:30 EDT	Jesic 13'	Report; Summary		Attendance: 8,218; Referee: Gerard Parsons

12 January 2011	Central Coast Mariners	3–3	Brisbane Roar	Bluetongue Stadium, Gosford
Wednesday 19:30 EDT	Kwasnik 37'; Simon 47'; Pérez 74' (pen.)	Report; Summary	Paartalu 23'; Broich 65'; Meyer 79'	Attendance: 7,312; Referee: Peter Green

==== Round 23 ====
14 January 2011	Gold Coast United	4–0	North Queensland Fury	Skilled Park, Gold Coast
Friday 19:30 EST	Djite 22', 43'; Smeltz 52'; Harold 82'	Report; Summary		Attendance: 2,514; Referee: Matthew Gillett

15 January 2011	Sydney FC	1–1	Melbourne Victory	Sydney Football Stadium, Sydney
Saturday 19:30 EDT	Makela 90+1'	Report; Summary	Allsopp 52'	Attendance: 11,387; Referee: Matthew Breeze

15 January 2011	Perth Glory	1–1	Melbourne Heart	nib Stadium, Perth
Saturday 18:45 WST	Howarth 34'	Report; Summary	Alex 70'	Attendance: 7,962; Referee: Gerard Parsons

16 January 2011	Newcastle Jets	0–2	Central Coast Mariners	EnergyAustralia Stadium, Newcastle
Sunday 17:00 EDT		Report; Summary	Simon 14'; Hutchinson 87'	Attendance: 13,463; Referee: Chris Beath

19 January 2011	Melbourne Heart	1–1	Gold Coast United	AAMI Park, Melbourne
Wednesday 20:00 EDT	Alex 17'	Report; Summary	Djite 40'	Attendance: 5,187; Referee: Strebre Delovski

19 January 2011	Perth Glory	1–2	Central Coast Mariners	nib Stadium, Perth
Wednesday 19:00 WST	Howarth 38'	Report; Summary	McBreen 22'; Simon 23'	Attendance: 6,828; Referee: Ryan Shepheard

==== Round 24 ====
21 January 2011	Adelaide United	8–1	North Queensland Fury	Hindmarsh Stadium, Adelaide
Friday 19:30 CDT	Flores 4', 37', 87'; T. Dodd 28'; Ramsay 42' van Dijk 46', 67', 83'	Report; Summary	Nikas 71'	Attendance: 10,986; Referee: Peter Green

22 January 2011	Melbourne Victory	2–2	Melbourne Heart	Etihad Stadium, Melbourne
Saturday 19:00 EDT	Allsopp 10'; Hernández 31'	Report; Summary	Aloisi 45+2', 51'	Attendance: 32,231; Referee: Chris Beath

22 January 2011	Gold Coast United	5–1	Newcastle Jets	Skilled Park, Gold Coast
Saturday 20:15 EST	Traoré 9'; Djite 36', 79', 87'; Smeltz 61'	Report; Summary	Zhang 75'	Attendance: 14,783; Referee: Matthew Breeze

23 January 2011	Wellington Phoenix	4–0	Perth Glory	Westpac Stadium, Wellington
Sunday 17:00 NZDT	Velaphi 9' (o.g.); Macallister 48'; Lia 59'; Greenacre 90'	Report; Summary		Attendance: 5,115; Referee: Peter O'Leary

23 January 2011	Central Coast Mariners	2–2	Sydney FC	Bluetongue Stadium, Gosford
Sunday 17:00 EDT	Pérez 49'; Simon 57'	Report; Summary	Petratos 17', 27'	Attendance: 10,546; Referee: Strebre Delovski

26 January 2011	Brisbane Roar	2–0	Wellington Phoenix	Skilled Park, Gold Coast (Note: Roar matches against Phoenix and Heart were originally scheduled at Suncorp Stadium for 16 and 26 January, respectively, but were postponed and relocated due to the floods in Brisbane and throughout Queensland.)
Wednesday 17:00 EST	Meyer 85', 90'	Report; Summary		Attendance: 3,522; Referee: Ryan Shepheard

26 January 2011	North Queensland Fury	0–3	Melbourne Victory	Dairy Farmers Stadium, Townsville
Wednesday 19:00 EST		Report; Summary	Allsopp 27'; Dugandzic 69', 73'	Attendance: 4,093; Referee: Jarred Gillett

==== Round 25 ====
29 January 2011	Brisbane Roar	2–1	Melbourne Heart	Skilled Park, Gold Coast
Saturday 16:30 EST	Solórzano 5'; Meyer 62'	Report; Summary	Sibon 75'	Attendance: 4,213; Referee: Matthew Breeze

29 January 2011	Adelaide United	1–2	Central Coast Mariners	Hindmarsh Stadium, Adelaide
Saturday 19:00 CDT	T. Dodd 90+1'	Report; Summary	Pérez 11'; Rose 30'	Attendance: 12,109; Referee: Strebre Delovski

29 January 2011	Perth Glory	0–2	Sydney FC	nib Stadium, Perth
Saturday 18:45 WST		Report; Summary	Carle 9'; Cazarine 53'	Attendance: 5,576; Referee: Gerard Parsons

30 January 2011	Wellington Phoenix	1–0	Newcastle Jets	Westpac Stadium, Wellington
Sunday 17:00 NZDT	Macallister 20'	Report; Summary		Attendance: 10,917; Referee: Chris Beath

30 January 2011	Melbourne Victory	2–0	Gold Coast United	AAMI Park, Melbourne
Sunday 17:00 EDT	Allsopp 25', 56'	Report; Summary		Attendance: 8,287; Referee: Peter Green

2 February 2011	Melbourne Victory	2–0	Newcastle Jets	Etihad Stadium, Melbourne
Wednesday 19:00 EDT	Pondeljak 57'; Kruse 69'	Report; Summary		Attendance: 11,296; Referee: Strebre Delovski

2 February 2011	Gold Coast United	0–0	Adelaide United	Skilled Park, Gold Coast
Wednesday 20:00 EST		Report; Summary		Attendance: 2,138; Referee: Chris Beath

==== Round 26 ====
4 February 2011	Melbourne Heart	1–1	Central Coast Mariners	AAMI Park, Melbourne
Friday 21:00 EDT	M. Thompson 49'	Report; Summary	McBreen 50'	Attendance: 3,667; Referee: Strebre Delovski

5 February 2011	Adelaide United	0–1	Wellington Phoenix	Hindmarsh Stadium, Adelaide
Saturday 18:30 CDT		Report; Summary	Greenacre 34'	Attendance: 7,498; Referee: Matthew Breeze

6 February 2011	Newcastle Jets	1–1	Sydney FC	EnergyAustralia Stadium, Newcastle
Sunday 17:00 EDT	Petrovski 84'	Report; Summary	Cazarine 77'	Attendance: 6,780; Referee: Peter Green

6 February 2011	Perth Glory	1–2	Gold Coast United	nib Stadium, Perth
Sunday 17:00 WST	Taggart 75'	Report; Summary	Smeltz 33' (pen.), 55' (pen.)	Attendance: 6,617; Referee: Jarred Gillett

8 February 2011	North Queensland Fury	1–2	Brisbane Roar	Skilled Park, Gold Coast (Note: Game was postponed and shifted from Dairy Farmers Stadium due to the impact of Cyclone Yasi.)
Tuesday 19:00 EST	Grossman 65'	Report; Summary	Nichols 14'; Henrique 58'	Attendance: 1,003; Referee: Jarred Gillett

9 February 2011	Sydney FC	2–0	Wellington Phoenix	Sydney Football Stadium, Sydney
Wednesday 19:00 EDT	Ward 54' (o.g.); Gan 69'	Report; Summary		Attendance: 4,732; Referee: Peter Green

9 February 2011	Gold Coast United	1–3	Central Coast Mariners	Skilled Park, Gold Coast (Note: Originally scheduled for 19 December 2010, this round 19 fixture was cancelled in the 20th minute due to the poor playing condition of the pitch. It was later replayed in week 26.)
Wednesday 20:00 EST	Smeltz 84'	Report; Summary	Ibini-Isei 13'; Amini 40'; Duke 67'	Attendance: 2,037; Referee: Chris Beath

10 February 2011	Newcastle Jets	4–0	Perth Glory	EnergyAustralia Stadium, Newcastle
Thursday 19:30 EDT	Haliti 13'; Brockie 55'; Petrovski 68' (pen.), 69'	Report; Summary		Attendance: 7,286; Referee: Matthew Breeze

==== Round 27 ====
11 February 2011	Adelaide United	2–1	Melbourne Victory	Adelaide Oval, Adelaide
Friday 19:30 CDT	Reid 6'; T. Dodd 78'	Report; Summary	A. Thompson 65'	Attendance: 21,083; Referee: Ryan Shepheard

12 February 2011	Melbourne Heart	2–2	Sydney FC	AAMI Park, Melbourne
Saturday 19:00 EDT	Worm 41'; Aloisi 62'	Report; Summary	Carle 34' (pen.), 88'	Attendance: 6,019; Referee: Ben Williams

12 February 2011	Brisbane Roar	4–0	Gold Coast United	Suncorp Stadium, Brisbane
Saturday 20:15 EST	Barbarouses 3'; Paartalu 41'; Henrique 65'; Broich 84'	Report; Summary		Attendance: 20,831; Referee: Peter Green

13 February 2011	Wellington Phoenix	3–1	North Queensland Fury	Westpac Stadium, Wellington
Sunday 17:00 NZDT	Greenacre 6'; Macallister 11'; Vukovic 90+4' (pen.)	Report; Summary	Studman 66'	Attendance: 12,718; Referee: Peter O'Leary

13 February 2011	Central Coast Mariners	1–0	Newcastle Jets	Bluetongue Stadium, Gosford
Sunday 17:00 EDT	Pérez 90'	Report; Summary		Attendance: 9,975; Referee: Chris Beath

=== Table of results ===
Abbreviation and Color Key: Adelaide United – AU; Brisbane Roar – BR; Central Coast Mariners – CCM; Gold Coast United – GCU; Melbourne Heart – MH; Melbourne Victory – MV; Newcastle Jets – NJ; Perth Glory – PG; Sydney FC – SFC; Wellington Phoenix – WP; Win; Loss; Draw; Home
Club	Match																													
Club	1	2	3	4	5	6	7	8	9	10	11	12	13	14	15	16	17	18	19	20	21	22	23	24	25	26	27	28	29	30
Adelaide United	NJ	CCM	MH	NQF	SFC	NJ	BR	PG	SFC	GCU	WP	MV	BR	PG	NJ	MH	GCU	WP	NQF	MH	PG	CCM	SFC	BR	MV	NQF	CCM	GCU	WP	MV
Adelaide United	0–0	1–1	3–2	2–3	1–3	2–1	1–1	2–0	1–2	0–0	3–0	2–1	4–0	2–0	3–1	0–2	2–1	2–1	2–0	1–2	4–2	2–0	2–0	0–1	1–4	8–1	1–2	0–0	0–1	2–1
Brisbane Roar	GCU	SFC	WP	NJ	MV	AU	MH	PG	NJ	CCM	MV	SFC	WP	AU	MH	NJ	NQF	PG	CCM	MV	SFC	NQF	GCU	AU	PG	CCM	WP	MH	NQF	GCU
Brisbane Roar	0–0	1–0	1–0	0–0	3–0	1–1	4–0	1–2	1–1	2–0	2–1	1–1	1–4	4–0	1–2	1–1	1–1	3–2	1–5	3–3	0–1	0–2	2–2	0–1	1–1	3–3	2–0	2–1	1–2	4 –0
Central Coast Mariners	MH	AU	WP	SFC	MV	MH	GCU	NQF	BR	PG	NQF	WP	MV	GCU	NJ	BR	SFC	PG	NQF	AU	MV	WP	BR	NJ	PG	SFC	AU	MH	GCU	NJ
Central Coast Mariners	0–1	1–1	2–0	1–1	2–0	1–0	0–0	3–2	2–0	5–0	0–1	0–3	2–2	2–3	1–1	1–5	4–0	1–1	1–0	2–0	1–2	1–0	3–3	0–2	1–2	2–2	1–2	1–1	1–3	1–0
Gold Coast United	BR	WP	MV	PG	CCM	NJ	SFC	WP	AU	MH	NQF	MV	SFC	CCM	AU	NQF	MH	WP	NJ	BR	PG	SFC	NQF	MH	NJ	MV	AU	PG	CCM	BR
Gold Coast United	0–0	3–3	0–1	0–1	0–0	1–0	1–1	3–1	0–0	0–0	1–2	0–1	3–1	2–3	2–1	1–2	3–0	2–0	2–0	2–2	0–0	2–0	4–0	1–1	5–1	2–0	0–0	1–2	1–3	4–0
Melbourne Heart	CCM	NJ	AU	PG	NQF	CCM	WP	BR	MV	WP	GCU	NJ	PG	NQF	BR	AU	WP	SFC	GCU	NJ	MV	AU	SFC	NQF	PG	GCU	MV	BR	CCM	SFC
Melbourne Heart	0–1	1–1	3–2	2–2	1–0	1–0	2–1	4–0	2–1	2–2	0–0	0–2	0–0	2–3	1–2	0–2	2–0	0–0	3–0	0–2	1–3	1–2	0–1	2–0	1–1	1–1	2–2	2–1	1–1	2–2
Melbourne Victory	SFC	PG	NQF	GCU	CCM	BR	WP	NQF	NJ	MH	SFC	BR	AU	GCU	PG	CCM	WP	BR	MH	PG	NJ	CCM	WP	AU	SFC	MH	NQF	GCU	NJ	AU
Melbourne Victory	3–3	0–2	2–2	0–1	2–0	3–0	0–0	0–0	0–0	2–1	3–0	2–1	2–1	0–1	3–1	2–2	2–2	3–3	1–3	2–0	2–1	1–2	2–0	1–4	1–1	2–2	0–3	2–0	2–0	2–1
Newcastle Jets	AU	MH	PG	BR	AU	PG	GCU	MV	BR	MH	SFC	AU	BR	WP	CCM	NQF	MH	GCU	WP	MV	SFC	NQF	NQF	CCM	GCU	WP	MV	SFC	PG	CCM
Newcastle Jets	0–0	1–1	1–0	0–0	2–1	2–0	1–0	0–0	1–1	0–2	1–0	3–1	1–1	1–0	1–1	0–2	0–2	2–0	4–0	2–1	1–2	1–3	1–0	0–2	5–1	1–0	2–0	1–1	4–0	1–0
North Queensland Fury	PG	SFC	MV	AU	MH	MV	WP	SFC	CCM	PG	GCU	CCM	MH	BR	PG	GCU	NJ	AU	SFC	BR	CCM	WP	MH	NJ	NJ	GCU	AU	MV	BR	WP
North Queensland Fury	3–3	2–1	2–2	2–3	1–0	0–0	2–1	1–1	3–2	2–1	1–2	0–1	2–3	1–1	1–1	1–2	0–2	2–0	1–0	0–2	1–0	1–1	2–0	1–3	1–0	4–0	8–1	0–3	1–2	3–1
Perth Glory	NQF	MV	NJ	MH	WP	GCU	NJ	AU	BR	NQF	SFC	CCM	MH	WP	AU	MV	SFC	BR	NQF	CCM	MV	AU	GCU	BR	MH	CCM	WP	SFC	GCU	NJ
Perth Glory	3–3	0–2	1–0	2–2	2–1	0–1	2–0	2–0	1–2	2–1	0–3	5–0	0–0	0–1	2–0	3–1	2–0	3–2	1–1	1–1	2–0	4–2	0–0	1–1	1–1	1–2	4–0	0–2	1–2	4–0
Sydney FC	MV	NQF	BR	CCM	AU	WP	GCU	NQF	AU	MV	PG	BR	NJ	GCU	PG	MH	WP	CCM	BR	NQF	MH	AU	NJ	GCU	MV	CCM	PG	NJ	WP	MH
Sydney FC	3–3	2–1	1–0	1–1	1–3	2–1	1–1	1–1	1–2	3–0	0–3	1–1	1–0	3–1	2–0	0–0	3–1	4–0	0–1	1–0	0–1	2–0	1–2	2–0	1–1	2–2	0–2	1–1	2–0	2–2
Wellington Phoenix	GCU	CCM	BR	PG	SFC	MV	MH	NQF	GCU	MH	AU	BR	PG	CCM	NJ	MH	MV	SFC	AU	GCU	NJ	NQF	MV	CCM	PG	BR	NJ	AU	SFC	NQF
Wellington Phoenix	3–3	2–0	1–0	2–1	2–1	0–0	2–1	2–1	3–1	2–2	3–0	1–4	0–1	0–3	1–0	2–0	2–2	3–1	2–1	2–0	4–0	1–1	2–0	1–0	4–0	2–0	1–0	0–1	2–0	3–1

== Finals series ==
Elimination finals
3	Adelaide United	1
6	Wellington Phoenix	0
4	Gold Coast United	1
5	Melbourne Victory	0

Semifinals
1	Brisbane Roar (agg.)	2	2
2	Central Coast Mariners	0	2
Adelaide United	2
Gold Coast United	3

Preliminary final
Central Coast Mariners	1
Gold Coast United	0

Grand final
Brisbane Roar (pen.)	2 (4)
Central Coast Mariners	2 (2)

=== Semi-finals ===
18 February 2011	Adelaide United	1–0	Wellington Phoenix	Hindmarsh Stadium, Adelaide
19:30 CDT	T. Dodd 70'	Report; Summary		Attendance: 10,285; Referee: Jarred Gillett

19 February 2011	Central Coast Mariners	0–2	Brisbane Roar	Bluetongue Stadium, Gosford
19:00 EDT		Report; Summary	Barbarouses 52'; McKay 73'	Attendance: 10,166; Referee: Matthew Breeze

20 February 2011	Gold Coast United	1–0	Melbourne Victory	Skilled Park, Gold Coast
16:30 EST	Djulbic 90+1'	Report; Summary		Attendance: 3,281; Referee: Strebre Delovski

26 February 2011	Brisbane Roar	2–2	Central Coast Mariners	Suncorp Stadium, Brisbane
19:00 EST	Broich 63'; Henrique 90+1'	Report; Summary	M. Smith 39' (o.g.); Bozanic	Attendance: 25,168; Referee: Peter Green

27 February 2011	Adelaide United	2–3	Gold Coast United	Hindmarsh Stadium, Adelaide
17:00 CDT	van Dijk 56' (pen.); Leckie 69'	Report; Summary	Smeltz 38', 79' (pen.); Djite 71'	Attendance: 15,028; Referee: Chris Beath

=== Preliminary final ===
5 March 2011	Central Coast Mariners	1–0	Gold Coast United	Bluetongue Stadium, Gosford
19:00 EDT	Kwasnik 75'	Report; Summary		Attendance: 7,539; Referee: Strebre Delovski

=== Grand Final ===
13 March 2011
16:00 EST

Brisbane Roar	2–2 (a.e.t.)	Central Coast Mariners
Henrique 117'; Paartalu 120'	Report; Summary	Kwasnik 96'; Bozanic 103'
Penalties
Franjic (penalty scored); Paartalu (penalty scored); McKay (penalty scored); Henrique (penalty scored)	4–2	(penalty scored) Hutchinson; (penalty scored) Wilkinson; (penalty missed) McBreen; (penalty missed) Bojić

Suncorp Stadium
Attendance: 50,168
Referee: Matthew Breeze

== Season statistics ==
=== Top scorers ===
As of end of regular season

Rank	Player	Club	Goals
1	(Indonesia) Sergio van Dijk	Adelaide United	16
2	(New Zealand) Kosta Barbarouses	Brisbane Roar	11
2	(Australia) Robbie Kruse	Melbourne Victory	11
2	(Australia) Matt Simon	Central Coast Mariners	11
2	(Costa Rica) Jean Solórzano	Brisbane Roar	11
6	(Brazil) Bruno Cazarine	Sydney FC	9
6	(Australia) Bruce Djite	Gold Coast United	9
6	(England) Robbie Fowler	Perth Glory	9
6	(Australia) Adam Kwasnik	Central Coast Mariners	9
10	(Australia) John Aloisi	Melbourne Heart	8
10	(Argentina) Marcos Flores	Adelaide United	8
10	(England) Chris Greenacre	Wellington Phoenix	8

==== Own goals ====
Player		Club	Against	Round
(Australia)	Ben Kantarovski	Newcastle Jets	Melbourne Heart	2
(Australia)	Brett Studman	North Queensland Fury	Adelaide United	4
(Australia)	Michael Marrone	Melbourne Heart	Perth Glory	4
(Australia)	Daniel McBreen	Central Coast Mariners	North Queensland Fury	9
(Australia)	Shannon Cole	Sydney FC	Adelaide United	9
(Australia)	Matt Smith	Brisbane Roar	Newcastle Jets	10
(Australia)	Naum Sekulovski	Perth Glory	Central Coast Mariners	12
(Australia)	Rodrigo Vargas	Melbourne Victory	Gold Coast United	13
(Australia)	Clint Bolton	Melbourne Heart	Adelaide United	15
(Australia)	Alex Wilkinson	Central Coast Mariners	Brisbane Roar	16
(Australia)	Matthew Kemp	Melbourne Victory	Brisbane Roar	17
(Australia)	Sebastian Ryall	Sydney FC	Central Coast Mariners	17
(Australia)	Wayne Srhoj	Melbourne Heart	Melbourne Victory	18
(Indonesia)	Sergio van Dijk	Adelaide United	Central Coast Mariners	20
(Australia)	Hayden Foxe	Sydney FC	Adelaide United	20
(Australia)	Adrian Leijer	Melbourne Victory	Central Coast Mariners	21
(Australia)	Tando Velaphi	Perth Glory	Wellington Phoenix	24
(Australia)	Nick Ward	Wellington Phoenix	Sydney FC	26

=== Attendance ===
These are the attendance records of each of the teams at the end of the home and away season. The table does not include finals series attendances.

Team	Hosted	Average	High	Low	Total
Melbourne Victory	15	15,234	32,321	8,287	228,517
Adelaide United	15	11,552	21,083	7,370	173,286
Brisbane Roar	15	9,279	20,831	3,522	139,182
Perth Glory	15	8,488	16,019	5,576	127,322
Newcastle Jets	15	8,429	13,463	3,114	126,439
Melbourne Heart	15	8,315	25,897	2,754	124,725
Wellington Phoenix	15	7,981	14,108	4,700	119,716
Central Coast Mariners	15	7,713	12,409	5,373	115,695
Sydney FC	15	7,656	12,106	4,012	114,834
North Queensland Fury	15	4,245	7,195	1,003	63,681
Gold Coast United	15	3,434	14,783	1,658	51,505
League total	165	8,393	32,321	1,003	1,384,902

Updated to the end of season.

- A Gold Coast United match held on 19 December 2010 was postponed due to the poor playing surface of the pitch and torrential rain after the 21st minute of the game had been played. Spectators were allowed free entry prior to the postponement, of which there were 10,146 in attendance of the 21,000+ who applied for the free tickets. The abandoned game's attendance is not taken into account.

==== Top 10 Attendances ====
Attendance	Round	Date	Home	Score	Away	Venue	Weekday	Time of Day
50,168	GF	13 March 2011	Brisbane Roar	2–2 (4–2 pen.)	Central Coast Mariners	Suncorp Stadium	Sunday	Afternoon
32,321	24	22 January 2011	Melbourne Victory	2–2	Melbourne Heart	Etihad Stadium	Saturday	Night
25,897	9	8 October 2010	Melbourne Heart	2–1	Melbourne Victory	AAMI Park	Friday	Night
25,168	SF Leg 2	26 February 2011	Brisbane Roar	2–2	Central Coast Mariners	Suncorp	Saturday	Night
23,059	18	11 December 2010	Melbourne Heart	1–3	Melbourne Victory	AAMI Park	Saturday	Night
21,083	27	11 February 2011	Adelaide United	2–1	Melbourne Victory	Adelaide Oval	Friday	Night
20,831	27	12 February 2011	Brisbane Roar	4–0	Gold Coast United	Suncorp	Saturday	Night
20,358	2	14 August 2010	Melbourne Victory	0–2	Perth Glory	AAMI Park	Saturday	Night
18,558	22	9 January 2011	Melbourne Victory	1–4	Adelaide United	AAMI Park	Sunday	Afternoon
17,299	10	16 October 2010	Melbourne Victory	3–0	Sydney FC	Etihad Stadium	Saturday	Night

=== Discipline ===
The Fair Play Award will go to the team with the lowest points on the fair play ladder at the conclusion of the home and away season. It was awarded to Premiers Brisbane Roar who beat last year's Champions Sydney FC by 6 points.

1 point	Yellow Card
2 points	Second Caution Red Card
3 points	Direct Red Card

Team	Yellow card	Yellow card Yellow card Red card	Red card	Points
Brisbane Roar	37	2	0	41
Sydney FC	45	1	0	47
Central Coast Mariners	45	2	0	49
Adelaide United	42	1	2	50
Wellington Phoenix	56	1	0	58
Gold Coast United	52	1	2	60
Newcastle Jets	52	2	3	65
North Queensland Fury	54	1	3	65
Melbourne Heart	56	4	1	67
Melbourne Victory	67	1	1	72
Perth Glory	62	5	5	87
Totals	568	21	17	

Updated to End of Week 27 (End of Regular Season)

== Awards ==
=== End-of-season awards ===
- Johnny Warren Medal – (Argentina) Marcos Flores
- NAB Young Footballer of the Year – (Australia) Mathew Ryan
- Golden Boot Award – (Netherlands) Sergio Van Dijk
- Goalkeeper of the Year – (Australia) Michael Theoklitos
- Manager of the Year – (Australia) Ange Postecoglou
- Fair Play Award – Brisbane Roar
- Referee of the Year – Matthew Breeze
- Foreign Player of the Year – (Argentina) Marcos Flores
- Solo Goal of the Year – (Australia) Erik Paartalu

=== All-Star team ===
Formation: 4–3–3

Position	Name	Club
GK	(Australia) Michael Theo	Brisbane Roar
RB	(Australia) Ivan Franjic	Brisbane Roar
CB	(Australia) Luke DeVere	Brisbane Roar
CB	(Australia) Joshua Rose	Central Coast Mariners
LB	(Brazil) Cássio	Adelaide United
CM	(Argentina) Marcos Flores	Adelaide United
CM	(Australia) Matt McKay	Brisbane Roar
CM	(Germany) Thomas Broich	Brisbane Roar
RF	(New Zealand) Kosta Barbarouses	Brisbane Roar
CF	(Netherlands) Sergio Van Dijk	Adelaide United
LF	(Australia) Robbie Kruse	Melbourne Victory
Coach	(Australia) Ange Postecoglou	Brisbane Roar

== See also ==
=== Team season articles ===
- 2010–11 Adelaide United FC season
- 2010–11 Brisbane Roar FC season
- 2010–11 Central Coast Mariners FC season
- 2010–11 Gold Coast United FC season
- 2010–11 Melbourne Heart FC season
- 2010–11 Melbourne Victory FC season
- 2010–11 Newcastle Jets FC season
- 2010–11 North Queensland Fury FC season
- 2010–11 Perth Glory FC season
- 2010–11 Sydney FC season
- 2010–11 Wellington Phoenix FC season
- Official season draw
