= Adam Hughes (soccer) =

Australian soccer player

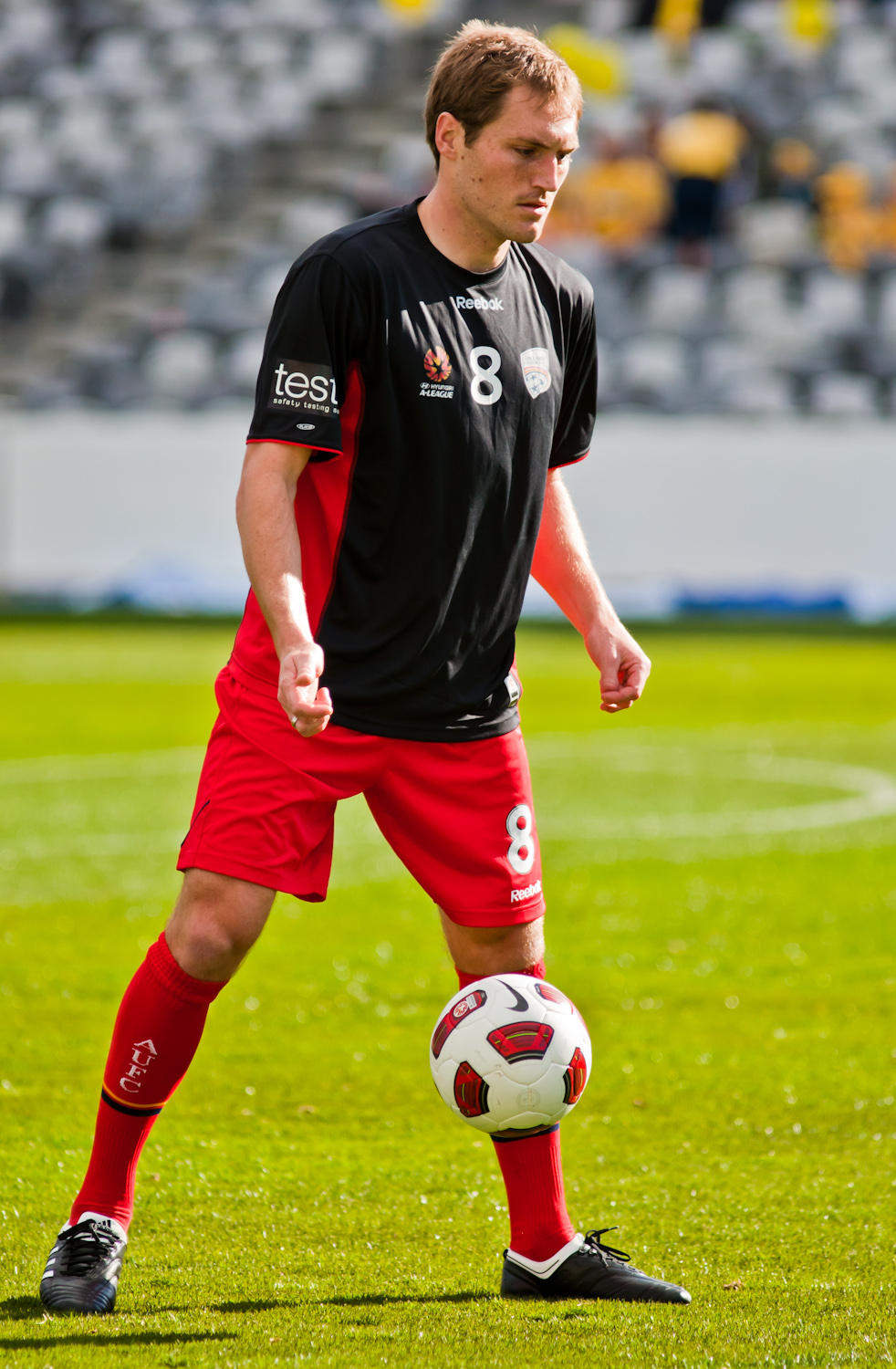
- Hughes warming up for Adelaide United in 2010

Personal information
- Full name: Adam Michael Hughes
- Date of birth: 14 July 1982 (age 44)
- Place of birth: Lismore, Australia
- Height: 1.86 m (6 ft 1 in)
- Position: Midfielder

Team information
- Current team: Charlestown City Blues

Senior career*
Years	Team	Apps	(Gls)
2001–2003	Newcastle United SC	10	(1)
2003–2004	Wollongong Wolves	24	(1)
2004	Balgownie Rangers	25	(9)
2004–2005	Wollongong Wolves	24	(6)
2005–2006	Doncaster Rovers	6	(0)
2006–2007	Sligo Rovers	55	(10)
2008–2009	Drogheda United	29	(3)
2009–2011	Adelaide United	57	(1)
2011–2012	Perth Glory	18	(2)
2012–2018	Zhejiang Yiteng	141	(19)
2019	Charlestown City Blues	7	(1)
2020–	Valentine FC	26	(2)
- * Club domestic league appearances and goals as of 11 November 2021

Adam Hughes (born 14 July 1982) is an Australian footballer.

== Club career ==
=== UK and Ireland ===
After the collapse of the National Soccer League (NSL) Hughes had a 2-year spell with English club Doncaster Rovers but never found his feet and left the club in 2006. While with Drogheda United he played and scored against Dynamo Kyiv in the Champions League qualifiers in 2008 .

=== Return to Australia ===
On 3 March 2009, he was signed by Adelaide United on a two-year deal. He previously played for Drogheda United, Sligo Rovers (IRE), Doncaster Rovers (ENG), Newcastle Jets, Wollongong Wolves in the Australian National Soccer League.

=== Perth Glory ===
On 28 April 2011, he was signed by Perth Glory on a two-year contract.

=== China ===
He moved to China, where he signed a contract with China League One club Harbin Yiteng.

== A-League career statistics ==
(Correct as of 1 June 2018)

Club	Season	League			Finals			Asia			Total		
Club	Season	Apps	Goals	Assists	Apps	Goals	Assists	Apps	Goals	Assists	Apps	Goals	Assists
Adelaide United	2009-10	26	1	0	-	-	-	-	-	-	26	1	0
Adelaide United	2010-11	29	0	0	2	0	0	-	-	-	31	0	0
Perth Glory	2011-12	18	2	0	-	-	-	-	-	-	18	2	0
Harbin Yiteng	2012	28	6		-	-	-	-	-	-	28	6	
Harbin Yiteng	2013	25	3		-	-	-	-	-	-	25	3	
Harbin Yiteng	2014	27	3		-	-	-	-	-	-	27	3	
Harbin Yiteng	2015	24	3		-	-	-	-	-	-	24	3	
Harbin Yiteng	2016	21	1		-	-	-	-	-	-	21	1	
Harbin Yiteng	2017	14	3		-	-	-	-	-	-	14	3	
Harbin Yiteng	2018	2	0		-	-	-	-	-	-	2	0	
Total		214	22	0	2	0	0	-	-	-	216	22	0

== Honours ==
Personal honours:

- League of Ireland F.A.I Team of the Year: 2007
- Wollongong Wolves Player of the Year: 2004/05
- Balgownie Rangers Player of the Year: 2004
- Illawarra Premier League Player of the Year: 2004
- Adelaide United Best Team Man: 2010–11
