= Bradley Norton =

Australian soccer player

Brad Norton
Personal information
- Full name: Bradley Norton
- Date of birth: 11 January 1991 (age 35)
- Place of birth: Melbourne, Australia
- Position: Left back

Team information
- Current team: South Melbourne
- Number: 11

Youth career
- 2007: Essendon Royals SC
- 2008: Port Melbourne SC
- 2009: Melbourne Knights
- 2009: Melbourne Victory

Senior career*
| Years | Team | Apps | (Gls) |
| 2008 | Port Melbourne | | |
| 2009 | Melbourne Knights | 7 | (0) |
| 2010 | Northcote City | 19 | (4) |
| 2010–2011 | Adelaide United | 2 | (0) |
| 2012– | South Melbourne | 231 | (12) |
- * Club domestic league appearances and goals as of 3 November 2022 ‡ National team caps and goals as of 5 August 2014

Bradley Norton (born 11 January 1991) is an Australian soccer player who plays for and captains South Melbourne FC in the NPL Victoria.

== Career ==
Norton made his first appearances at senior level in 2008 with Port Melbourne Sharks. He then moved to Melbourne Knights in 2009 before being selected in the Melbourne Victory youth squad for 2009–10 season.

=== Adelaide United ===
Norton initially joined Adelaide United as youth team player in 2010. He made his senior debut for Adelaide on 24 September 2010 replacing Joe Keenan in the 87th minute in the game against Perth Glory. and was later signed to a senior contract with the club. He was released by Adelaide in September 2011 to return to his hometown Melbourne.
