= Iain Ramsay =

Filipino professional footballer (born 1988)

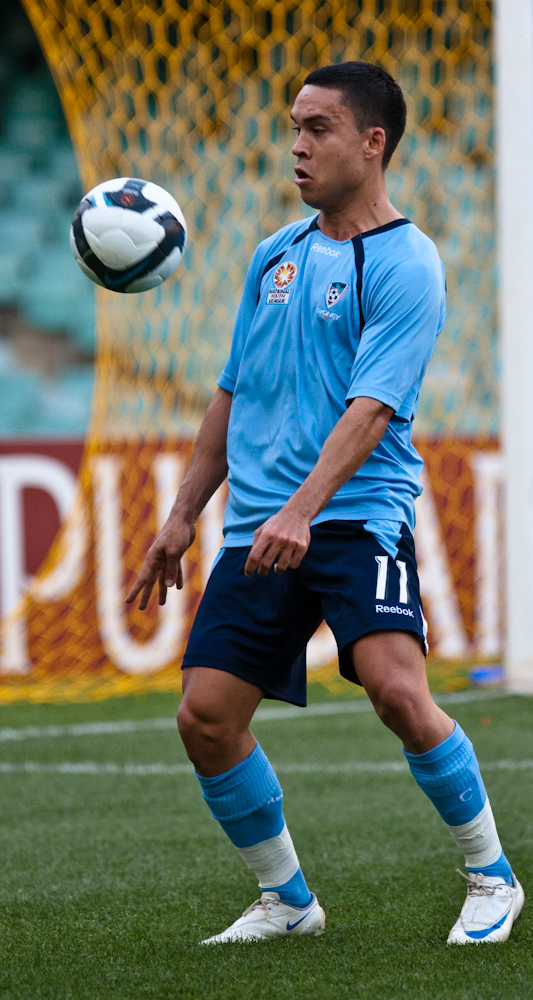
- Ramsay with Sydney FC in 2009

Personal information
- Full name: Iain Irinco Ramsay
- Date of birth: 27 February 1988 (age 38)
- Place of birth: Perth, Australia
- Height: 1.80 m (5 ft 11 in)
- Positions: Left winger; left back

Youth career
- –2006: Llanelli
- 2006–2007: Gretna
- 2008–2009: Sydney Olympic
- 2009–2010: Sydney FC

Senior career*
Years	Team	Apps	(Gls)
2010	Sydney FC	1	(0)
2010	Sydney Olympic	37	(1)
2010–2013	Adelaide United	78	(11)
2013–2015	Melbourne City	46	(3)
2015–2016	Tractor Sazi	8	(0)
2017	Ceres–Negros	34	(11)
2018	Felda United	16	(2)
2019	Sukhothai	30	(5)
2020–2021	PT Prachuap	26	(1)
2021–2022	Nongbua Pitchaya	19	(1)
2022–2023	Lamphun Warrior	13	(0)
2023	→ Chiangmai United (loan)	14	(0)
2023	Rockdale Ilinden	10	(2)

International career^{‡}
2015–2022	Philippines	36	(5)
- * Club domestic league appearances and goals as of 28 September 2023 ‡ National team caps and goals as of 25 March 2022

Iain Irinco Ramsay (born 27 February 1988) is a former professional footballer who played as a left winger or a left back. Born in Australia, he played for the Philippines national team. He previously made competitive appearances for Sydney FC, Melbourne City, Sydney Olympic, Adelaide United, Tractor Sazi, Ceres–Negros and Felda United.

== Early life and education ==
Ramsay was born in Perth, Australia to a Scottish father and a Filipino mother. Ramsay's father was born in Dunblane, Scotland while his mother was born in Pampanga, Philippines who migrated to Australia at age 30 before the 1990s. Ramsay attended Prairiewood High School and Bossley Park High School.

== Club career ==
In 2006 at 17 years old, Ramsay secured a contract with Scottish club, Gretna F.C. as a youth player. He also spent some time of his youth career with Sydney F.C.

=== Sydney Olympic ===
Ramsay signed for New South Wales Premier League team Sydney Olympic, returning to the club he played for as a youth.

=== Adelaide United ===
On 23 July 2010, Ramsay signed a one-year professional contract with Adelaide United. On 20 August 2010, Ramsay scored two goals against Melbourne Heart, to help Adelaide win the game. His third goal for Adelaide came against his former club Sydney FC in a come from behind 2–1 victory. Ramsay scored in extra time to give Adelaide the 3 points.

=== Melbourne Heart ===
On 7 April 2013, Melbourne Heart FC (now known as Melbourne City FC), announced Ramsay had signed with the club for the 2013–14 season. On 13 May 2015, Melbourne City confirmed that Ramsay was released from the club.

=== Tractor Sazi ===
In the summer of 2015 Ramsay signed with Persian Gulf Pro League club Tractor Sazi. He made his debut for the club in an away match against Gostaresh Foolad where his team won 3–1. He assisted three times in first two matches of his team.

Under manager, Toni, Ramsay started in some matches. When Amir Ghalenoei took over Tractor Sazi, Ramsay didn't have playing time with his club. It was reported on 2 January 2016 that Tractor Sazi has terminated Ramsay's contract. As of May 2016, is a free agent. He is not ruling out any future stints in Iran.

In July 2016, Ramsay went on trial at Eerste Divisie side FC Volendam.

=== Ceres-Negros ===
In January 2017, Ceres-Negros announced that they have signed in Ramsay, along with few other players, to play for the club. Ramsay scored his first goal on 7 March against Tampines Rovers FC for the 2017 AFC Cup, which ended 5–0 home victory. He was also instrumental to his club's 4–1 win over Global Cebu in the title match of the 2017 Philippines Football League Final Series by scoring a hat-trick.

=== FELDA United F.C. ===
Ramsay was signed in by Thai club, PT Prachuap in late 2017 while the 2017 season of the Philippines Football League was still ongoing. He completed the season with Ceres and was set to play for the Thai club who would be making their debut in the Thai League in the 2018 season. However, in January 2018, Ramsay decided to move to FELDA United F.C. of the Malaysia Super League instead.

== International career ==
Due to Ramsay being born in Australia and the heritage of his parents, Ramsay was eligible to play for Australia, Scotland and the Philippines.

Ramsay was called up to the Philippines national team in May 2015, ahead of the 2018 World Cup Qualifiers against Bahrain and Yemen. He scored his first goal in the 74th minute in a 2–0 away success versus Yemen. Ramsay's second international goal came on 29 March 2016, against North Korea.

Earlier, he said he aimed of playing for Australia but also considered the Philippines as "a great option" if he is not able to get a call-up from the Socceroos.

He is one of many foreign born players in the Philippines national team. In 2015, he told Vice: "Of course there are a few that will question some of the squad players not being full blooded Filipino. But whether it's a half, a quarter, three-quarters: we consider ourselves Filipino, and we are honored to represent the country."

== Career statistics ==
=== International goals ===
Scores and results list the Philippines' goal tally first.

No.	Date	Venue	Opponent	Score	Result	Competition
2015
1.	16 June	Suheim Bin Hamad Stadium, Doha, Qatar	Yemen	2–0	2–0	2018 FIFA World Cup qualification
2016
2.	29 March	Rizal Memorial Stadium, Manila, Philippines	North Korea	3–2	3–2	2018 FIFA World Cup qualification
3.	10 October	Rizal Memorial Stadium, Manila, Philippines	North Korea	1–3	1–3	Friendly
2017
4.	28 March	Rizal Memorial Stadium, Manila, Philippines	Nepal	3–0	4–1	2019 AFC Asian Cup qualification
2019
5.	14 November	National Football Stadium, Malé, Maldives	Maldives	1–0	2–1	2022 FIFA World Cup qualification

== Honours ==
=== Club ===
Sydney FC

- A-League (1): 2009–10

=== Personal ===
- National Youth-League: Sydney FC National Youth League Player of the Year 2009–10
- Adelaide United Rising Star: 2010–11
