= Francisco Usúcar =

Uruguayan footballer (born 1986)

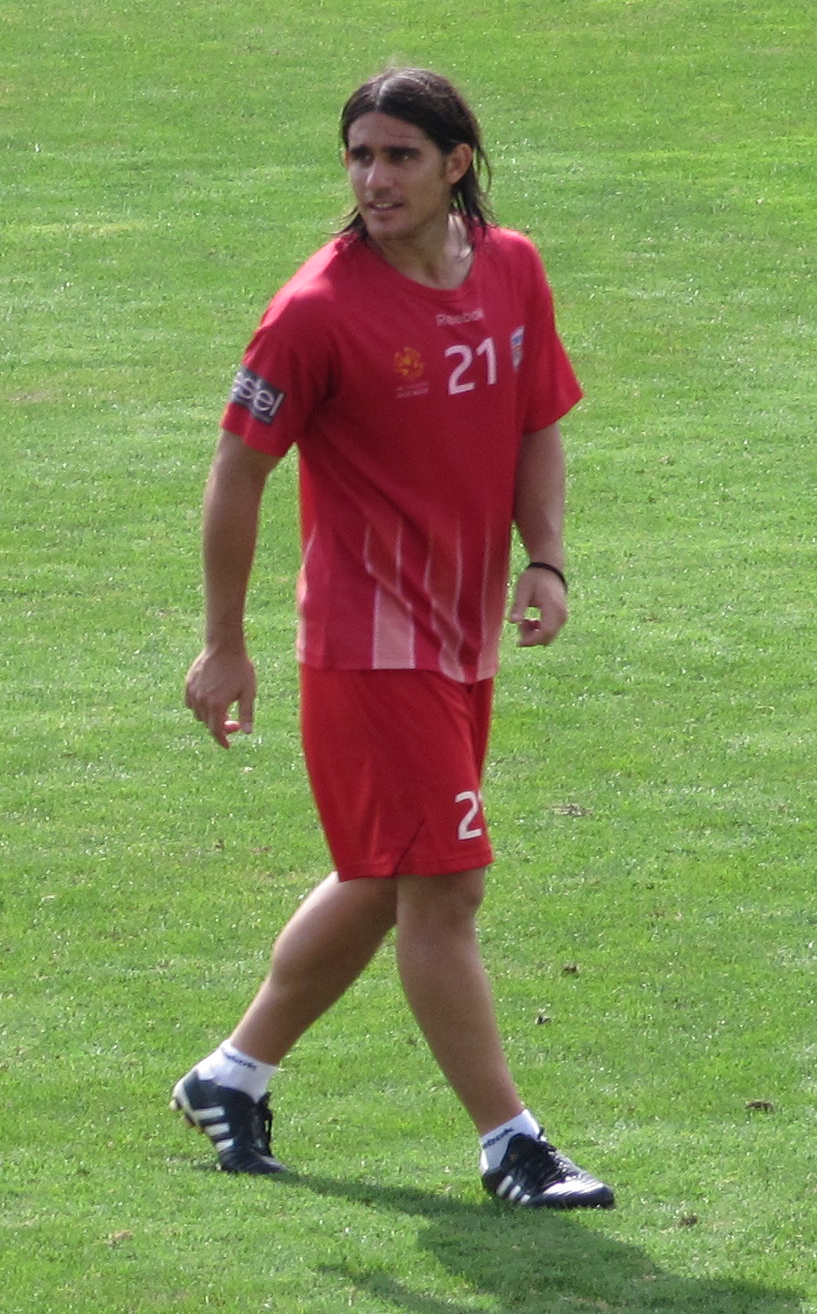

Personal information
- Full name: Francisco Andrés Usúcar Pasquetta
- Date of birth: 17 April 1986 (age 40)
- Place of birth: Montevideo, Uruguay
- Height: 1.72 m (5 ft 7 1/2 in)
- Position: Defensive midfielder

Team information
- Current team: Técnico Universitario (manager)

Senior career*
Years	Team	Apps	(Gls)
2006–2008	Defensor Sporting	1	(0)
2007–2008	→ Rampla Juniors (loan)	11	(0)
2008–2011	Central Español	56	(1)
2011–2012	Adelaide United	29	(0)
2012–2013	Técnico Universitario	26	(0)
2013–2014	Sheikh Russel KC		
2015	Macará		
2016	Atenas	14	(0)
2016	Clan Juvenil		
2017–2018	Atenas	37	(0)

International career
2001–2003	Uruguay U-17	13	(2)
2004–2005	Uruguay U-20	5	(0)

Managerial career
- 2024: Mushuc Runa (youth)
- 2024: Aucas (assistant)
- 2026: Técnico Universitario
- 2026: ADT
- 2026–: Técnico Universitario
- * Club domestic league appearances and goals

Francisco Andrés Usúcar Pasquetta (born 17 April 1986) is a Uruguayan football manager and former player who played as a defensive midfielder. He is the current manager of Ecuadorian club Técnico Universitario.

== Club career ==
=== Central Español ===
Usucar was transferred to Central Español in mid-2008. He played three championships with such team, and scored one goal in the 2010–11 season against River Plate.

=== Adelaide United ===
On 13 November 2011 it was announced he had signed for A-League club Adelaide United. Usúcar made his debut as a starting squad member for Adelaide United on 9 January 2011 win over arch-rivals Melbourne Victory in Melbourne. Usúcar has represented Uruguay's U-20 and U-17 national teams. He has played in Uruguay's Primera Division with Central Español contrary to reports he was never on loan to Greek Superleague Club Panathinaikos. After impressing on debut, Usucar signed a 2-year contract extension. Since arriving in Adelaide in January 2011, Usucar has made 34 appearances in all competitions for Adelaide United, consisting of 29 Hyundai A-League games and five in this year's AFC Champions League competition.

=== Técnico Universitario ===
Usúcar had attracted interest from Ecuadorian Serie A club Técnico Universitario and he signalled his interest to Adelaide United of his desire to move on. On Wednesday, 11 July 2012 it was announced he had signed for Técnico Universitario.

== Career statistics ==
(Current as of 15 July 2013)

Club	Season	League		Finals/Cup		Continental		International		Total	
Club	Season	Apps	Goals	Apps	Goals	Apps	Goals	Apps	Goals	Apps	Goals
Defensor Sporting	2006–07	1	0	0	0	0	0	0	0	1	0
Rampla Juniors	2007–08	11	0	2	0	0	0	0	0	13	0
Central Español	2008–09	18	0	0	0	0	0	0	0	18	0
Central Español	2009–10	26	0	0	0	0	0	0	0	26	0
Central Español	2010–11	12	1	0	0	0	0	0	0	12	1
Adelaide United	2010–11	6	0	1	0	0	0	0	0	7	0
Adelaide United	2011–12	22	0	0	0	4	0	0	0	26	0
Técnico Universitario	2012	19	0	0	0	0	0	0	0	19	0
Técnico Universitario	2013	7	0	0	0	0	0	0	0	7	0
Total Career		122	1	3	0	4	0	0	0	129	1
