= Dario Bodrušić =

Bosnian-born Croatian footballer

Personal information
- Full name: Dario Bodrušić
- Date of birth: 25 January 1983 (age 43)
- Place of birth: Bugojno, SFR Yugoslavia
- Height: 1.86 m (6 ft 1 in)
- Position: Defender

Youth career
- Dinamo Zagreb

Senior career*
Years	Team	Apps	(Gls)
2003–2004	Inker Zaprešić	29	(0)
2004–2007	Slaven Belupo	86	(3)
2007–2008	Dinamo Tirana	29	(3)
2008–2009	Rijeka	18	(1)
2009	Dinamo Tirana	1	(0)
2009–2010	Istra 1961	20	(1)
2011	Adelaide United	4	(0)
2012–2014	Rudeš	57	(7)
2014–2015	TSV Hartberg	31	(3)
2015–2016	Rudeš	32	(3)
2016–2017	NK Zagreb	9	(0)
2017–2019	SK Bischofshofen	46	(4)

International career
2004–2005	Croatia U-21	15	(0)
- * Club domestic league appearances and goals as of 13 May 2021

Dario Bodrušić (born 25 January 1983 in Bugojno, SR Bosnia and Herzegovina, SFR Yugoslavia) is a Bosnian-born Croatian football retired defender.

== Club career ==
The defender played for NK Istra 1961 in the Croatian First League. In January 2011, he signed with A-League club Adelaide United.

After a short stint with the Reds Bodrusic was released on a free transfer along with youngsters Francesco Monterosso and Joe Costa. He returns to his second spell with Rudeš in July 2015, following his departure from TSV Hartberg. He later had another spell in Austria with SK Bischofshofen 1933.

== International ==
He played for the Croatian U-21 team.
