= Patricio Pérez =

Argentine footballer (born 1985)

Personal information
- Full name: Patricio Pablo Pérez
- Date of birth: 27 June 1985 (age 41)
- Place of birth: Ciudadela, Argentina
- Height: 1.68 m (5 ft 6 in)
- Position: Attacking midfielder

Senior career*
Years	Team	Apps	(Gls)
2002–2009	Vélez Sársfield	37	(0)
2005	→ León (loan)	7	(0)
2007	→ Chacarita (loan)	17	(4)
2007	→ Everton (loan)	15	(5)
2008	→ SM Tucumán (loan)	23	(1)
2009	Defensa y Justicia	28	(5)
2010–2011	Central Coast Mariners	18	(6)
2011–2012	All Boys	1	(0)
2012	Boca Unidos	14	(3)
2012–2013	Patronato	17	(2)
2013–2016	Once Caldas	37	(11)
2016–2017	Excursionistas	16	(1)
2017–2018	Comunicaciones	16	(0)
2018–2019	San Miguel	3	(0)

International career
2001–2002	Argentina U17	6	(2)
2003–2005	Argentina U20	20	(3)
- * Club domestic league appearances and goals as of 12:56, 23 May 2020 (UTC)

Patricio Pablo Pérez (born 27 June 1985) is an Argentine footballer who plays as midfielder.

== Club career ==
=== Early career ===
Pérez began his career at Vélez Sársfield in 2002. In 2005, he moved on loan to Mexican club León, but returned to Argentina shortly afterward. In June 2007 he joined on loan to Chilean side Everton. After another two loans at Chacarita and San Martín de Tucumán respectively, Pérez left Vélez Sársfield and signed permanently for second-tier Defensa y Justicia.

=== Central Coast Mariners ===
In June 2010, Pérez signed a 2-year deal with A-League club Central Coast Mariners. Perez made his first start for the club in a pre-season friendly against rivals Melbourne Victory.

His competitive debut came on 28 August in an A-league match against local rivals Sydney FC. His performance was impressive but controversial, with Perez diving and subsequently winning a penalty, as well as getting Sydney FC goalkeeper Liam Reddy sent off. He converted the penalty. Afterwards, he was handed a 2-match ban for simulation by the FFA, and Reddy's sending off was revoked.

On 23 March 2011, Central Coast Mariners agreed to release Perez from the final year of his contract on compassionate grounds. It was revealed by both the player and the club that his exit was due to homesickness.

== Honours ==
Vélez Sársfield

- Torneo Clausura: 2005

Argentina

- FIFA World Youth Championship: 2005
