= Ricardinho (footballer, born 1983) =

Brazilian footballer

Personal information
- Full name: Ricardo Weslei de Campelo
- Date of birth: 19 November 1983 (age 42)
- Place of birth: Birigüi, Brazil
- Height: 1.81 m (5 ft 11 1/2 in)
- Positions: Striker; attacking midfielder

Senior career*
Years	Team	Apps	(Gls)
2001–2003	Marília	13	(8)
2003–2009	Atlético Paranaense	23	(1)
2004–2006	→ Marília (loan)	63	(35)
2007	→ Fortaleza (loan)	11	(5)
2008	→ Ipatinga (loan)	14	(5)
2008	→ Paraná (loan)	15	(9)
2009–2010	→ Jeju United (loan)	26	(6)
2010	Oeste	14	(2)
2010–2011	Melbourne Victory	19	(2)
2011	→ Paraná (loan)	12	(2)
2012–2017	Ferroviária	82	(16)
- * Club domestic league appearances and goals

Ricardo Weslei de Campelo, also known as Ricardinho (born 19 November 1983) is a Brazilian former footballer.

== Melbourne Victory ==
On 19 August 2010, Ricardinho was officially unveiled as Melbourne Victory's international marquee player, where he signed a two-year deal and was handed the number 9 shirt. Melbourne's signing of Ricardinho came at a time when the club was short of strikers, having sold Danny Allsopp and with Archie Thompson sidelined with a long-term injury. Ricardinho debuted off the bench for Melbourne in a 2–0 loss against Central Coast Mariners on 3 September 2010. On 12 September 2010, on his full debut with Melbourne Victory, Ricardinho scored his first goal in a 3–0 win at home to Brisbane Roar.

Ricardinho was not selected as one of the five foreign imports for Melbourne's 2011 Asian Champions League campaign, and as a result was loaned to Campeonato Brasileiro Série B club Paraná Clube back in his home country of Brazil.

On 21 August 2011, Melbourne Victory announced its intention to release Ricardinho from his contract after his loan spell with Paraná Clube expired.
