= Shin In-seob =

South Korean footballer (born 1989)

Inseob Shin
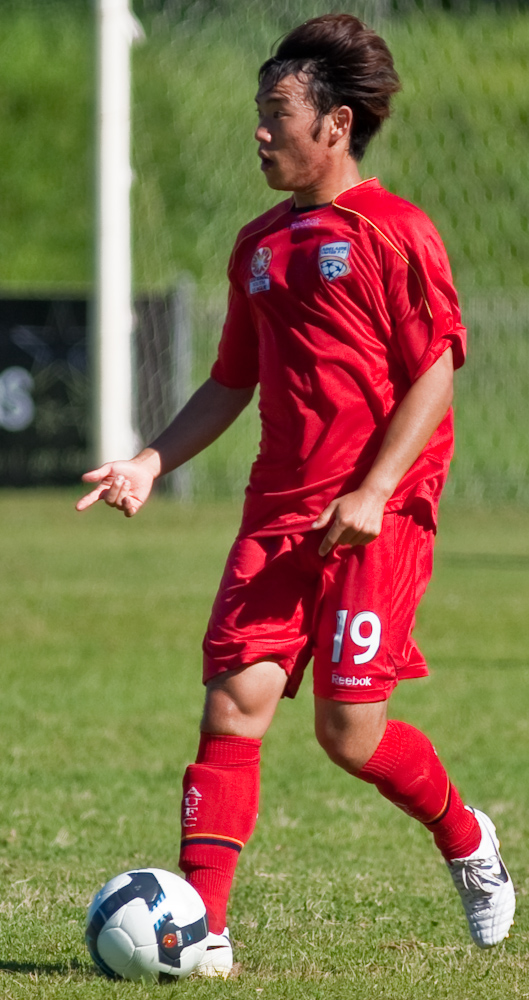

Personal information
- Full name: Shin In-Seob
- Date of birth: 1 June 1989 (age 37)
- Place of birth: Seoul, South Korea
- Height: 1.75 m (5 ft 9 in)
- Position: Attacking midfielder

Team information
- Current team: FC Pocheon

Youth career
- 2007–2009: Konkuk University

Senior career*
Years	Team	Apps	(Gls)
2009–2011	Adelaide United	21	(0)
2011	Busan I'Park	0	(0)
2012	Beijing Baxy	10	(2)
2014	Yongin City	7	(0)
2015–	FC Pocheon		
- * Club domestic league appearances and goals as of 1 January 2015

Shin In-Seob (Korean: 신인섭; born 1 June 1989) also written as Inseob Shin, is a South Korean footballer currently playing for FC Pocheon in the K3 League, the fourth tier of South Korean football.

== Biography ==
=== Early life ===
Shin In-Seob was first introduced to football at the age of 7, when his family moved to England. He returned to South Korea five years later.

=== Club career ===
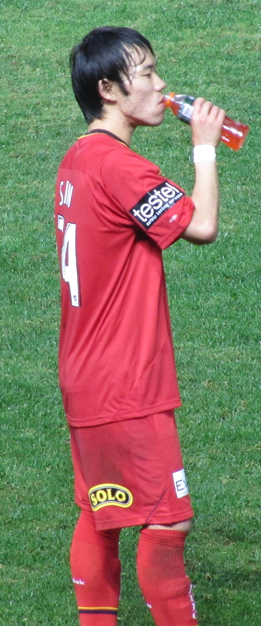
Shin in a pre-season game for Adelaide United

At an early stage of his career, Shin was given the opportunity to go on trial with the Crystal Palace Youth Academy for a 5-month period.

Shin's first trial appearance in Adelaide United's line-up came on June 16, 2009 in a friendly against South Australian Super League side, Raiders. He again started for Adelaide on June 26, in the club's first friendly against A-League opposition for 2009, Perth Glory. On June 29, Shin signed his first professional contract with Adelaide United since leaving Konkuk University where he played in the Korean University League.

Shin was set to play his first A-League match in Adelaide United's season opener on August 7, 2009; but was unable to do so as his international clearance had not been processed in time for the match. As of August 11, 2009, Shin's international transfer certificate has been received by Football Federation Australia and he is therefore registered to play in A-League matches as of Round 2 of the 2009–10 season.

Shin made his professional debut as a substitute in Adelaide United's loss to Sydney FC on August 16, 2009. He scored his first goal in a Youth League match against Melbourne Victory on September 18, 2009.

In November 2010, after failing to make an impact at Adelaide, Shin decided to return to South Korea and applied for the 2011 K-League draft. On 9 November 2010, he was successfully drafted to K-League side Busan I'Park as of 2011.

Shin spent 2012 with Chinese side Beijing Baxy where he scored two goals for the first team. In 2014, he joined Yongin City in the National League, the third tier of South Korean football.

=== Personal life ===
As a result of his time in England, Shin is fluent in English as well as his native Korean. Shin revealed that his favourite singer is K-pop artist, Wheesung and his favourite TV Show is Infinite Challenge, a Korean entertainment show, in an interview for an Australian newspaper in 2009.

== Career statistics ==
(Correct as of 7 March 2014)

Club	Season	League		Finals		Continental		International		Total	
Club	Season	Apps	Goals	Apps	Goals	Apps	Goals	Apps	Goals	Apps	Goals
Adelaide United	2009–10	13	0	0	0	0	0	0	0	13	0
Adelaide United	2010–11	6	0	0	0	0	0	0	0	6	0
Busan I'Park	2011	0	0	0	0	0	0	0	0	0	0
Beijing Baxy	2012	?	2	0	0	0	0	0	0	?	2
Yongin City	2014	0	0	0	0	0	0	0	0	?	2
Total		19	0	0	0	0	0	0	0	19	2
