= Joe Keenan (footballer) =

English footballer (born 1982)

Personal information
- Full name: Joseph John Keenan
- Date of birth: 14 October 1982 (age 44)
- Place of birth: Southampton, England
- Position: Left midfielder

Youth career
- 1999–2002: Chelsea

Senior career*
Years	Team	Apps	(Gls)
2002–2006	Chelsea	2	(0)
2003–2005	→ VC Westerlo (loan)	40	(1)
2005	→ Brentford (loan)	3	(0)
2006–2007	Willem II	17	(0)
2007–2008	Melbourne Victory	12	(0)
2008–2009	Hibernian	15	(0)
2010–2013	South Melbourne	32	(4)
2010–2011	→ Adelaide United (loan)	14	(1)
Total		135	(6)
- * Club domestic league appearances and goals

Joseph John Keenan (born 14 October 1982) is an English former professional footballer who played as a left midfielder.

== Club career ==
Keenan started his career with Premier League club Chelsea. He made his first-team debut for Chelsea in 2002 as a substitute for John Terry against Aston Villa; his second appearance came as a replacement for Gianfranco Zola in an FA Cup tie. Keenan was given a four-year contract in 2002 and was seen as a "hot prospect" by Claudio Ranieri. He suffered a broken leg soon afterwards, however, which kept him out of action for most of the 2002–03 season. He made one further appearance in a league match, but fell out of favour after Jose Mourinho became manager and was loaned out to Westerlo and Brentford.

Keenan then signed for Melbourne Victory, playing as a left wingback for the 2007–08 Australian champions. He can also play anywhere across the midfield. Keenan signed for Scottish Premier League side Hibernian in July 2008. He scored his first goal for the club in a Scottish League Cup defeat against Morton, but he struggled to hold down a first team place, making only 16 appearances. When John Hughes replaced Mixu Paatelainen as manager before the start of the 2009–10 season, Keenan was told that he was free to find a new club. Keenan was released from his contract at the end of August.

Keenan signed a contract with South Melbourne on 9 December 2009 to play in the upcoming VPL season. He returned to the A-League on loan with Adelaide United for the 2010–11 season as an injury replacement player for injured Nigel Boogaard.
