= Joseph Costa (soccer) =

Australian soccer player

Joe Costa
Personal information
- Full name: Joseph Costa
- Date of birth: 17 July 1992 (age 34)
- Place of birth: Adelaide, Australia
- Height: 1.71 m (5 ft 7 1/2 in)
- Position: Attacking midfielder

Team information
- Current team: Adelaide Raiders
- Number: 8

Youth career
- Doncaster Rovers
- Western Strikers
- Adelaide City
- 2006–2009: SASI
- 2008–2011: Adelaide United

Senior career*
Years	Team	Apps	(Gls)
2009–2011	Adelaide United	1	(0)
2011–2012	Adelaide City	21	(2)
2015	Adelaide City	3	(0)
2016	Adelaide Comets	6	(0)
2017–2019	Adelaide City	65	(9)
2020	Adelaide Raiders	19	(4)
2021–2022	Adelaide City	27	(5)
2023	Adelaide Raiders	22	(5)

International career^{‡}
2007	Australia U-17	1	(0)
- * Club domestic league appearances and goals as of 11 October 2023 ‡ National team caps and goals as of 23 August 2011

Joseph Costa (born 17 July 1992) is an Australian soccer player who most recently played for Adelaide Raiders.

== Club career ==
On 3 June 2009, he was signed to a two-year deal by Adelaide United after having made 9 appearances for their inaugural National Youth League squad.

On 7 August 2009 he made his senior debut for Adelaide in the opening game of the season, coming on in the 59th minute against Perth Glory.

== Career statistics ==
(Correct as of 7 August 2009)

Club	Season	League		Finals		Continental		International		Total	
Club	Season	Apps	Goals	Apps	Goals	Apps	Goals	Apps	Goals	Apps	Goals
Adelaide United	2009–10	1	0	0	0	0	0	0	0	1	0
Total		1	0	0	0	0	0	0	0	1	0

== Honours ==
With Australia:

- AFF U16 Youth Championship: 2008
