= 2010–11 North Queensland Fury FC season =

Coordinates: 19°18′58″S 146°42′43″E

North Queensland Fury
2010–11 season
- Chairman: Rabieh Krayem
- Manager: Frantisek Straka
- A-League: 11th
- Top goalscorer: David Williams (5)
- Highest home attendance: 7,195
- Lowest home attendance: 2,761
Home colours	Away colours

The 2010–11 season was North Queensland Fury's second, and final, season in the Hyundai A-League

== Players ==
=== First team squad ===
Note: Flags indicate national team as defined under FIFA eligibility rules; some limited exceptions apply. Players may hold more than one non-FIFA nationality.

No.	Pos.	Nation	Player
1	GK	AUS	Justin Pasfield
2	DF	SRI	Jack Hingert (Youth)
3	DF	PNG	Brad McDonald (Youth)
4	DF	TOG	Eric Akoto
5	DF	ENG	Mark Hughes
6	MF	AUS	Ufuk Talay (Captain)
7	DF	AUS	Gareth Edds (Vice-Captain)
8	MF	AUS	Adam Casey
9	FW	UGA	Eugene Sseppuya
10	FW	ANT	Dyron Daal
11	FW	AUS	David Williams
12	MF	AUS	Panni Nikas

No.	Pos.	Nation	Player
13	DF	GER	André Kilian
14	MF	AUS	Chris Grossman
15	FW	AUS	Chris Payne (Youth)
16	DF	AUS	Simon Storey
17	FW	AUS	Alex Read (Youth)
18	DF	AUS	Brett Studman
19	MF	AUS	Isaka Cernak
20	GK	AUS	Matt Ham
21	MF	AUS	Jason Spagnuolo
22	DF	AUS	Lorenzo Sipi (Youth)
28	GK	AUS	Sebastian Usai (Injury replacement player*)

- * Injury replacement player for Matt Ham.

==== Injury replacement list ====
Injured Player	Injury Replacement	Injury	Injury Replacement Deal	Fee
(Australia) Matt Ham	(Australia) Jerrad Tyson	Partial tear of the anterior cruciate ligament.	Six weeks.	Loan From Gold Coast United
(Australia) Matt Ham	(Australia) Sebastian Usai	Partial tear of the anterior cruciate ligament.	Rest of the season (originally four weeks).	Loan From Brisbane Strikers*
(Togo) Eric Akoto	(Australia) Ramazan Tavsancioglu	Grade 2 tear of the medial ligament.	Six weeks.	Loan From South Melbourne
(Australia) Osama Malik	(Australia) Ramazan Tavsancioglu	Grade 2 tear to his left hamstring.	Six weeks.	Loan From South Melbourne

Note: Sebastian Usai replaced Jerrad Tyson on the short term deal after he was called up for the U23 National side.

=== Transfers ===
==== In ====
Date	Player	From	Fee	Source
2010-04-29	(Australia) Matt Ham	(Australia) Brisbane Roar	Free	
2010-04-29	(Australia) Simon Storey	(Scotland) Airdrie United	Free	
2010-05-21	(Australia) Adam Casey	(Australia) Sydney FC	Free	
2010-05-21	(Germany) André Kilian	(Germany) FC Schalke 04 II	Free	
2010-05-24	(Australia) Brett Studman	(Australia) Bankstown City Lions	Free	
2010-06-01	(Australia) Panni Nikas	(Australia) Central Coast Mariners	Free	
2010-06-04	(Australia) Isaka Cernak	(Australia) Brisbane Roar	Free	
2010-06-23	(Australia) Gareth Edds	(England) Tranmere Rovers	Free	
2010-06-29	(Australia) Chris Payne	(Australia) Sydney FC	Free	
2010-06-29	(England) Mark Hughes	(England) Walsall F.C.	Free	
2010-07-05	(Togo) Eric Akoto	(Greece) OFI	Free	
2010-07-31	(Uganda) Eugene Sseppuya	(Lithuania) FK Sūduva	Free	
2010-08-12	(Papua New Guinea) Brad McDonald	(Australia) Brisbane Strikers	Free	
2010-11-4	(Australia) Lorenzo Sipi	(Australia) North Queensland Razorbacks	Free	
January 2011	(Australia) Alex Read	(Australia) Valentine Phoenix FC	Free	

==== Out ====
Date	Player	To	Fee	Source
2010-02-11	(Australia) Robbie Middleby		Retired	
2010-03-02	(Australia) John Tambouras	(China) Guangzhou FC	Free	
2010-03-24	(Australia) Rostyn Griffiths	(Australia) Central Coast Mariners	Free	
2010-04-01	(New Zealand) Jeremy Brockie	(Australia) Newcastle Jets	Free	
2010-04-10	(Scotland) Scott Wilson		Released	
2010-04-13	(Australia) Shane Stefanutto	(Australia) Brisbane Roar	Free	
2010-04-17	(Australia) Matt Smith	(Australia) Brisbane Roar	Free	
2010-04-27	(England) Robbie Fowler	(Australia) Perth Glory	Free	
2010-05-07	(Australia) Beau Busch	(Australia) Manly United	Free	
2010-05-15	(Australia) Paul Henderson	(Australia) Sydney Olympic	Free	
2010-05-19	(Australia) Fred Agius	(Australia) Adelaide City	Free	.
2010-06-12	(Australia) Jacob Timpano	(Australia) Sydney United	Free	
2010-06-27	(Australia) Paul Kohler	(Australia) Sutherland Sharks	Free	.
2010-06-27	(England) James Robinson		Released	
2010-06-27	(England) Terry Cooke	(Azerbaijan) Gabala FC	Free	.
2010-06-27	(Australia) Chris Tadrosse	(Australia) Bonnyrigg White Eagles	Free	
2010-06-27	(Australia) Karl Dodd		Released	.
2010-07-25	(Australia) Jimmy Downey	(Netherlands) Sparta Rotterdam	Free	
January 2011	(Uganda) Eugene Sseppuya	(Romania) Petrolul Ploiești	Free	
January 2011	(Australia) Osama Malik	(Australia) Adelaide United	Free	

- Note: Michael Marrone had initially signed with the Fury but pulled out on his deal.

== Key dates ==
- 20 February 2010: Former employee at the Fury Doug Kingston sues the club for $372,500 over a contract breach. An agreement is reached five days later by both parties in Supreme Court.
- 3 March 2010: North Queensland Fury’s future is put into disarray when sole owner Don Matheson withdraws his support to the club.
- 31 March 2010: North Queensland Fury is saved by various local businessmen and by the Townsville City Council.
- 6 April 2010: Manager, Ian Ferguson, leaves the club to join Perth Glory as an assistant coach.
- 27 April 2010: Former marquee player for the Fury, Robbie Fowler, officially joins Perth Glory as their marquee player.
- 14 May 2010: North Queensland Fury sign former A-League player, Stuart McLaren, as an assistant coach.
- 7 June 2010: The Fury sign Frantisek Straka as head coach on a one-year contract.
- 10 June 2010: Rabieh Krayem is announced as the new CEO.
- 29 July 2010: The club announces Ufuk Talay as the Captain and Gareth Edds as Vice-Captain for the upcoming season.
- 5 August 2010: The club announces Mission Australia as one of the major sponsors for the next three seasons as well as a three-year sponsorship deal with People Resourcing.
- 17 September 2010: The CEO Circle is signed on as a sleeve sponsor.
- 21 January 2011: North Queensland Fury suffer the worst defeat in A-League history going down 8–1 to Adelaide United.

== Matches ==
=== Pre-season fixtures ===
25 June 2010	North Queensland Fury (Australia)	0 : 0	(Australia) North Queensland Razorbacks	Townsville Sports Reserve
		Report

1 July 2010	North Queensland Fury (Australia)	7 : 2	(Australia) North Queensland Razorbacks	Townsville Sports Reserve

8 July 2010	Whitsunday Miners FC (Australia)	0 : 8	(Australia) North Queensland Fury	Wanderers football grounds
		Report	Dyron Daal; Chris Payne; Brett Studman; Isaka Cernak; Jason Spagnuolo

17 July 2010	North Queensland Fury (Australia)	4 : 1	(Papua New Guinea) Hekari United	Brolga Park
	Chris Payne; Dyron Daal; Adam Casey	Report	Kema Jack	Attendance: 1300

25 July 2010	Gold Coast United (Australia)	1 : 0	(Australia) North Queensland Fury	Carrara Stadium
	Gol Gol Mebrahtu	Report		Referee: Matt Gillett

30 July 2010	North Queensland Fury (Australia)	1 : 0	(Australia) Adelaide United	Brolga Park
	Adam Casey 70'	Report		Attendance: Approx 2000; Referee: Chris Beath

=== 2010–11 Hyundai A-League fixtures ===
6 August 2010	Perth Glory	3 : 3	North Queensland Fury	nib Stadium, Perth
Friday 20:00 WST	Jelić 5'; Neville 74'; Sterjovski 79'	Report; Summary	Payne 34'; Williams 64'; Grossman 90+2'	Attendance: 16,019; Referee: (Australia) Kevin Docherty

14 August 2010	North Queensland Fury	2 : 1	Sydney FC	Dairy Farmers Stadium, Townsville
Saturday 17:15 EST	Grossman 65'; Daal 83'	Report; Summary	Jamieson 82'	Attendance: 5,177; Referee: (Australia) Peter Green

22 August 2010	Melbourne Victory	2 : 2	North Queensland Fury	AAMI Park, Melbourne
Sunday 15:00 EST	K. Muscat 30' (pen.), 75' (pen.)	Report; Summary	Sseppuya 16'; Grossman (red card) 30'; Akoto (red card) 81'; Payne 82' (pen.)	Attendance: 13,318; Referee: (Scotland) Chris Boyle

28 August 2010	North Queensland Fury	2 : 3	Adelaide United	Dairy Farmers Stadium, Townsville
Saturday 17:15 EST	Cernak 7'; Williams 87'	Report; Summary	Flores 22'; Studman 50' (o.g.); D. Mullen 56'	Attendance: 6,130; Referee: (Australia) Peter Green

4 September 2010	Melbourne Heart	1 : 0	North Queensland Fury	AAMI Park, Melbourne
Saturday 17:15 EST	Kalmar 11'	Report; Summary		Attendance: 4,184; Referee: (Australia) Gerard Parsons

18 September 2010	North Queensland Fury	0 : 0	Melbourne Victory	Dairy Farmers Stadium, Townsville
Saturday 17:15 EST		Report; Summary		Attendance: 4,922; Referee: (Australia) Chris Beath

24 September 2010	Wellington Phoenix	2 : 1	North Queensland Fury	Westpac Stadium, Wellington
Friday 19:30 NZST	Greenacre 3'; Bertos 13'; Lia (yellow card) 37' (yellow-red card) 65'	Report; Summary	M. Hughes 67'	Attendance: 7,212; Referee: (New Zealand) Peter O'Leary

29 September 2010	Sydney FC	1 : 1	North Queensland Fury	Sydney Football Stadium, Sydney
Wednesday 19:30 EST	Cole 37'	Report; Summary	Williams 76'	Attendance: 6,978; Referee: (Australia) Ryan Shepheard

2 October 2010	Central Coast Mariners	3 : 2	North Queensland Fury	Bluetongue Stadium, Gosford
Saturday 17:15 EST	Simon 47'; Pérez 57' (pen.); Zwaanswijk 90+1'	Report; Summary	Storey 12'; McBreen 78' (o.g.); Daal (yellow card) 45' (yellow-red card) 80'	Attendance: 6,656; Referee: (Australia) Kurt Ams

15 October 2010	North Queensland Fury	2 : 1	Perth Glory	Dairy Farmers Stadium, Townsville
Friday 19:30 EST	Payne 16'; Williams 72'	Report; Summary	Baird 22'	Attendance: 4,011; Referee: (Australia) Gerard Parsons

31 October 2010	North Queensland Fury	1 : 2	Gold Coast United	Dairy Farmers Stadium, Townsville
Sunday 17:00 EST	M. Hughes 45'	Report; Summary	Traoré 11'; Djulbic 85'	Attendance: 7,195; Referee: (Australia) Matthew Breeze

5 November 2010	North Queensland Fury	0 : 1	Central Coast Mariners	Dairy Farmers Stadium, Townsville
Friday 19:30 EST		Report; Summary	Zwaanswijk 36'	Attendance: 3,625; Referee: (Australia) Gerard Parsons

10 November 2010	North Queensland Fury	2 : 3	Melbourne Heart	Dairy Farmers Stadium, Townsville
Wednesday 20:00 EST	Daal 12'; Talay 85' (pen.)	Report; Summary	Babalj 50'; Sibon 59'; Zahra 64'	Attendance: 2,866; Referee: (Australia) Jarred Gillett

20 November 2010	Brisbane Roar	1 : 1	North Queensland Fury	Suncorp Stadium, Brisbane
Saturday 20:15 EST	Franjic 85'	Report; Summary	Edds 9'	Attendance: 10,126; Referee: (Australia) Alan Milliner

28 November 2010	North Queensland Fury	1 : 1	Perth Glory	Dairy Farmers Stadium, Townsville
Sunday 17:00 EST	M. Hughes 80'	Report; Summary	Fowler 23'; Sekulovski (yellow card) 38' (yellow-red card) 50'; B. Griffiths (yellow card) 59' (yellow-red card) 64'	Attendance: 4,491; Referee: (Australia) Kris Griffiths-Jones

1 December 2010	Gold Coast United	1 : 2	North Queensland Fury	Skilled Park, Gold Coast
Wednesday 20:00 EST	Robson 10'	Report; Summary	Williams 28'; Talay 68'	Attendance: 1,714; Referee: (Australia) Matthew Breeze

4 December 2010	North Queensland Fury	0 : 2	Newcastle Jets	Dairy Farmers Stadium, Townsville
Saturday 20:15 EST		Report; Summary	Topor-Stanley 79'; Petrovski 90+3'	Attendance: 3,573; Referee: (Australia) Kurt Ams

10 December 2010	Adelaide United	2 : 0	North Queensland Fury	Hindmarsh Stadium, Adelaide
Friday 19:30 CDT	Flores 5' van Dijk 16'	Report; Summary		Attendance: 8,786; Referee: (Australia) Matthew Gillett

15 December 2010	North Queensland Fury	1 : 0	Sydney FC	Dairy Farmers Stadium, Townsville
Wednesday 20:00 EST	Talay 71'	Report; Summary		Attendance: 2,761; Referee: (Australia) Chris Beath

18 December 2010	North Queensland Fury	0 : 2	Brisbane Roar	Dairy Farmers Stadium, Townsville
Saturday 20:15 EST		Report; Summary	Barbarouses 7', 76'	Attendance: 4,412; Referee: (Australia) Peter Green

22 December 2010	Central Coast Mariners	1 : 0	North Queensland Fury	Bluetongue Stadium, Gosford
Wednesday 19:30 EDT	Kwasnik 28'	Report; Summary		Attendance: 5,979; Referee: (Australia) Ryan Shepheard

27 December 2010	North Queensland Fury	1 : 1	Wellington Phoenix	Dairy Farmers Stadium, Townsville
Monday 19:15 EST	Payne 12'	Report; Summary	Macallister 76'	Attendance: 5,107; Referee: (Australia) Jarred Gillett

2 January 2011	Melbourne Heart	2 : 0	North Queensland Fury	AAMI Park, Melbourne
Sunday 17:00 EDT	Aloisi 58'; Sibon 82'	Report; Summary		Attendance: 6,482; Referee: (Australia) Peter Green

8 January 2011	North Queensland Fury	1 : 3	Newcastle Jets	Dairy Farmers Stadium, Townsville
Saturday 20:15 EST	M. Hughes 90+5' (pen.)	Report; Summary	Zadkovich 13'; Haliti 16'; Ryan Griffiths 70'	Attendance: 4,315; Referee: (Australia) Ryan Shepheard

11 January 2011	Newcastle Jets	1 : 0	North Queensland Fury	EnergyAustralia Stadium, Newcastle
Tuesday 7:30 EDT	Jesic 13'	Report; Summary		Attendance: 8,218; Referee: (Australia) Gerard Parsons

14 January 2011	Gold Coast United	4 : 0	North Queensland Fury	Skilled Park, Gold Coast
Friday 19:30 EST	Djite 22', 43'; Smeltz 52'; Harold 82'	Report; Summary		Attendance: 2,514; Referee: (Australia) Matthew Gillett

21 January 2011	Adelaide United	8 : 1	North Queensland Fury	Hindmarsh Stadium, Adelaide
Friday 19:30 CDT	Flores 4', 37', 87'; T. Dodd 28'; Ramsay 42' van Dijk 46', 67', 83'	Report; Summary	Nikas 71'	Attendance: 10,986; Referee: (Australia) Peter Green

26 January 2011	North Queensland Fury	0 : 3	Melbourne Victory	Dairy Farmers Stadium, Townsville
Wednesday 19:00 EST		Report; Summary	Allsopp 27'; Dugandzic 69', 73'	Attendance: 4,093; Referee: (Australia) Jarred Gillett

8 February 2011	North Queensland Fury	1 : 2	Brisbane Roar	Skilled Park, Gold Coast (Note: Game was postponed and shifted from Dairy Farmers Stadium due to the impact of Cyclone Yasi.)
Tuesday 19:00 EST	Grossman 65'	Report; Summary	Nichols 14'; Henrique 58'	Attendance: 1,003; Referee: (Australia) Jarred Gillett

13 February 2011	Wellington Phoenix	3 : 1	North Queensland Fury	Westpac Stadium, Wellington
Sunday 17:00 NZDT	Greenacre 6'; Macallister 11'; Vukovic 90+4' (pen.)	Report; Summary	Studman 66' (red card) 90+4'	Attendance: 12,718; Referee: (New Zealand) Peter O'Leary

Notes

Pos	Team	Pld	W	D	L	GF	GA	GD	Pts	Qualification
1	Brisbane Roar (C)	30	18	11	1	58	26	+32	65	Qualification for 2012 AFC Champions League group stage and Finals series (Note: First place qualifies for the 2012 AFC Champions League group stage. Winning the 2011 A-League Grand Final automatically earns qualification for the 2012 AFC Champions League group stage, unless first place are champions. Second place qualifies for the 2012 AFC Champions League qualifying play-off, unless they qualify for the 2011 A-League Grand Final alongside first place or become A-League Champions, subsequently third place then qualify for the 2012 AFC Champions League qualifying play-off.)
2	Central Coast Mariners	30	16	9	5	50	31	+19	57	Qualification for 2012 AFC Champions League group stage and Finals series
3	Adelaide United	30	15	5	10	51	36	+15	50	Qualification for 2012 AFC Champions League qualifying play-off and Finals series
4	Gold Coast United	30	12	10	8	40	32	+8	46	Qualification for Finals series
5	Melbourne Victory	30	11	10	9	45	39	+6	43	Qualification for Finals series
6	Wellington Phoenix	30	12	5	13	39	41	−2	41	Qualification for Finals series
7	Newcastle Jets	30	9	8	13	29	33	−4	35	
8	Melbourne Heart	30	8	11	11	32	42	−10	35	
9	Sydney FC	30	8	10	12	35	40	−5	34	
10	Perth Glory	30	5	8	17	27	54	−27	23	
11	North Queensland Fury	30	4	7	19	28	60	−32	19	

Source: ultimatealeague.com
Rules for classification: 1) points; 2) goal difference; 3) number of goals scored.
(C) Champions

== Statistics ==
Last updated on 19 February 2010.
(Substitute appearances in brackets)

No.	Pos.	Name	A-league		A-League Final Series		Total		Discipline	
No.	Pos.	Name	Apps	Goals	Apps	Goals	Apps	Goals	Yellow card	Red card
1	GK	(Australia) Justin Pasfield	26	0	0	0	26	0	1	0
2	DF	(Sri Lanka) Jack Hingert	14 (6)	0	0	0	14 (6)	0	5	0
3	DF	(Papua New Guinea) Brad McDonald	18 (7)	0	0	0	18 (7)	0	1	0
4	DF	(Togo) Éric Akoto	14 (1)	0	0	0	14 (1)	0	5	1
5	DF	(England) Mark Hughes	30	4	0	0	30	4	7	0
6	MF	(Australia) Ufuk Talay	17 (5)	3	0	0	17 (5)	3	6	0
7	DF	(Australia) Gareth Edds	25 (1)	1	0	0	25 (1)	1	2	0
8	MF	(Australia) Adam Casey	5 (4)	0	0	0	5 (4)	0	1	0
9	FW	(Uganda) Eugene Sseppuya	7 (6)	1	0	0	7 (6)	1	1	0
10	FW	(Netherlands Antilles) Dyron Daal	8 (8)	2	0	0	8 (8)	2	3	1
11	FW	(Australia) David Williams	28	5	0	0	28	5	3	0
12	MF	(Australia) Panni Nikas	15 (3)	1	0	0	15 (3)	1	2	0
13	DF	(Germany) André Kilian	18 (1)	0	0	0	18 (1)	0	4	0
14	MF	(Australia) Chris Grossman	16 (6)	3	0	0	16 (6)	3	1	1
15	FW	(Australia) Chris Payne	15 (6)	4	0	0	15 (6)	4	1	0
16	DF	(Australia) Simon Storey	24 (1)	1	0	0	24 (1)	1	2	0
17	MF	(Australia) Osama Malik	15 (2)	0	0	0	15 (2)	0	2	0
17	FW	(Australia) Alex Read	0 (2)	0	0	0	0 (2)	0	1	0
18	DF	(Australia) Brett Studman	5 (4)	1	0	0	5 (4)	1	0	1
19	MF	(Australia) Isaka Cernak	12 (2)	1	0	0	12 (2)	1	1	0
20	GK	(Australia) Matthew Ham	0	0	0	0	0	0	0	0
21	MF	(Australia) Jason Spagnuolo	5 (13)	0	0	0	5 (13)	0	3	0
22	DF	(Australia) Lorenzo Sipi	1 (4)	0	0	0	1 (4)	0	0	0
24	DF	(Australia) Ramazan Tavsancioglu	8 (4)	0	0	0	8 (4)	0	3	0
28	GK	(Australia) Jerrad Tyson	0	0	0	0	0	0	0	0
28	GK	(Australia) Sebastian Usai	4	0	0	0	4	0	0	0
