= List of North Queensland United FC players =

This is a list of all players to play in the Australian Hyundai A-League for the now defunct club Northern Fury FC.

Northern Fury FC was a club which appeared in the 2009–10 and 2010–11 seasons of the Australian A-League. The club played a total of 57 matches in its two seasons in the competition, winning 12, drawing 15 and losing 30. In total, 44 players made A-League appearances for the club. in March 2011 the club was axed from the league due to financial doubts from Football Federation Australia.

== Records ==
- (Australia) David Williams was the most capped Fury player, with 49 appearances for the club.
- (England) Robbie Fowler is the club's all-time top scorer, with 9 goals.

== Notable players ==
=== Internationals ===
Northern Fury FC had 8 player with international experience play for them, including 3 Australians.

- (Australia) Robbie Middleby played 5 times for the Socceroos in 2002.
- Robbie Fowler scored 7 goals in his 26 appearances for England. This included appearing at the 2002 FIFA World Cup.
- Dyron Daal was one of eight players to play in both of the Fury's A-League seasons. Daal has made 7 international appearances for small nation Netherlands Antilles.
- David Williams, another player to play in both of the Fury's seasons, has made 2 appearances for Australia.
- (New Zealand) Jeremy Brockie has played 21 times for the All Whites. He has made appearances at both the 2008 Olympics and 2010 FIFA World Cup.
- Eric Akoto made over 50 appearances for Togo, scoring one goal. He was a member of the squad at the 2006 FIFA World Cup- the first FIFA World Cup for which Togo qualified. He was also on the bus involved in the Togo national football team attack.
- Eugene Sseppuya has scored 2 goals in his 7 appearances for the Uganda national football team.
- (Australia) Shane Stefanutto has 3 Socceroos caps.

=== Other notable players ===
- (Australia) Ufuk Talay
- (England) Mark Hughes

== Key ==
- The list is ordered first by date of debut, and then if necessary in alphabetical order.
- Appearances as a substitute are included.
- Statistics are correct up to and including the match played on 11 February 2022. Where a player left the club permanently after this date, his statistics are updated to his date of leaving.

Positions key
GK	Goalkeeper
DF	Defender
MF	Midfielder
FW	Forward

Nationality
Unless otherwise noted, the nationality of a player is determined by the country/countries which he has played for, or if said person has not played international football, their country of birth.
Position
Playing positions are listed according to the position that was employed at the time.
Club career
Club career is defined as the first and last calendar years in which the player appeared for the club in any of the competitions listed below.
Total appearances and Total goals
Total appearances and goals comprise those in the A-League.

== Players ==
List of Northern Fury FC players
Player	Nationality	Pos	Club career	Starts	Subs	Total	Goals
Player	Nationality	Pos	Club career	Appearances			Goals
Dyron Daal	Netherlands Antilles	FW	2009–2010	16	22	38	7
Karl Dodd	Australia	DF	2009	8	0	8	0
Robbie Fowler	England	FW	2009–2010	26	0	26	9
Rostyn Griffiths	Australia	MF	2009–2010	21	2	23	2
Paul Henderson	Australia	GK	2009	14	0	14	0
Jack Hingert	Australia	DF	2009–2011	20	7	27	0
Kojiro Kaimoto	Japan	DF	2009	1	1	2	0
Paul Kohler	Japan	DF	2009	1	1	2	0
Daniel McBreen	Australia	FW	2009–2010	16	5	21	3
Robbie Middleby	Australia	DF	2009–2010	21	0	21	0
James Robinson	England	MF	2009	12	1	13	0
Jason Spagnuolo	Australia	FW	2009–2011	13	24	37	0
John Tambouras	Australia	DF	2009–2010	16	0	16	1
David Williams	Australia	FW	2009–2011	42	7	49	8
Beau Busch	Australia	DF	2009–2010	8	0	8	0
Shane Stefanutto	Australia	DF	2009	7	0	7	0
Chris Tadrosse	Australia	DF	2009–2010	23	0	23	1
Ufuk Talay	Australia	MF	2009–2011	28	5	33	3
Fred Agius	Australia	FW	2009–2010	2	3	5	0
Chris Grossman	Australia	MF	2009–2011	29	14	43	5
Justin Pasfield	Australia	GK	2009–2011	39	0	39	0
Scott Wilson	Australia	DF	2009	3	1	4	0
Jeremy Brockie	New Zealand	MF	2009–2010	9	5	14	1
Osama Malik	Australia	MF	2009–2010	19	4	23	0
Terry Cooke	England	MF	2009–2010	4	6	10	2
Matt Smith	England	DF	2009–2010	11	0	11	0
Grant Smith	Scotland	MF	2009–2010	4	1	5	0
Jimmy Downey	Australia	DF	2010	4	0	4	0
Eric Akoto	Togo	DF	2010	14	1	15	0
Adam Casey	Australia	FW	2010–2011	5	4	9	0
Isaka Cernak	Australia	MF	2010–2011	12	2	14	1
Gareth Edds	Australia	MF	2010–2011	25	1	26	1
Mark Hughes	England	DF	2010–2011	30	0	30	4
Chris Payne	Australia	FW	2010–2011	15	6	21	4
Simon Storey	Australia	DF	2010–2011	24	1	25	0
Eugene Sseppuya	Uganda	FW	2010	7	6	13	1
Brad McDonald	Papua New Guinea	DF	2010–2011	18	7	25	0
Brett Studman	Australia	DF	2010–2011	5	4	9	1
Panny Nikas	Australia	MF	2010–2011	15	3	18	1
Andre Kilian	Germany	DF	2010–2011	18	1	19	0
Lorenzo Sipi	Australia	DF	2010–2011	1	4	5	0
Ramazan Tavsancioglu	Australia	DF	2010–2011	8	4	12	0
Sebastian Usai	Australia	GK	2011	4	0	4	0
Alex Read	Australia	FW	2011	0	2	2	0

== Captains ==
Dates	Captain
2009–11	Ufuk Talay (AUS)
