= Adelaide United FC 8–1 North Queensland Fury FC =

2011 football match in Australia

Adelaide United 8–1 North Queensland Fury
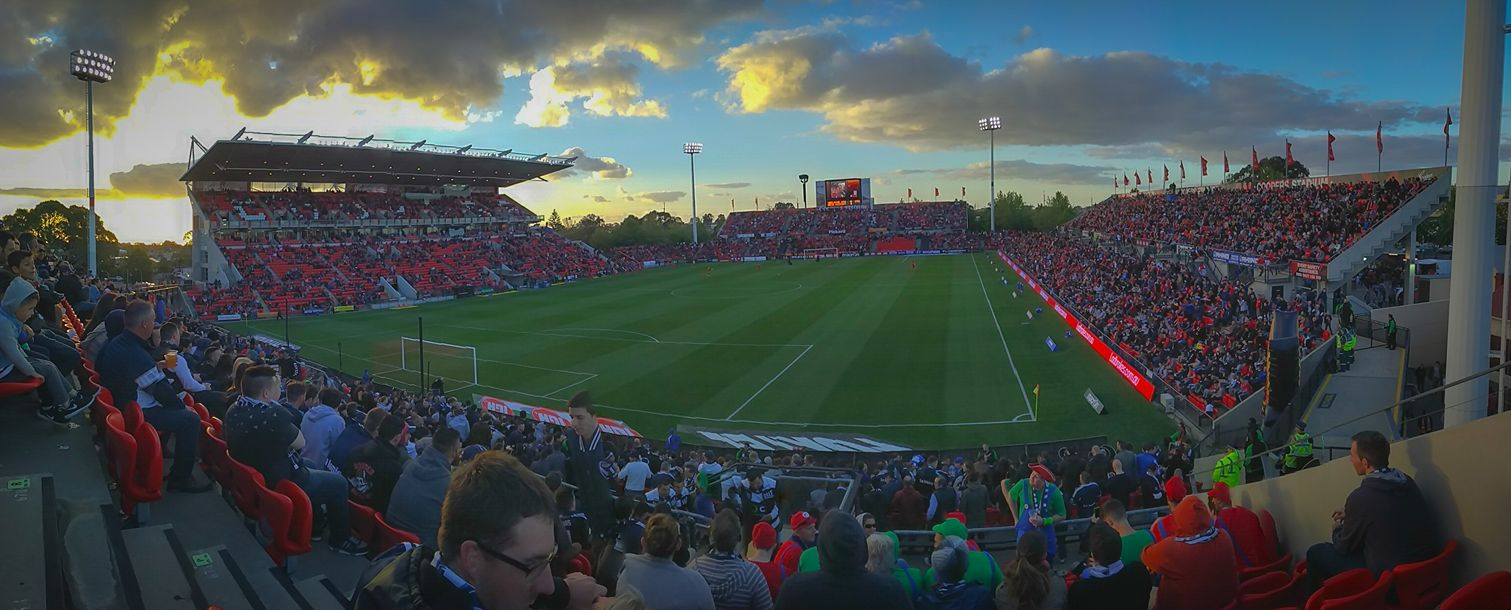
- The match took place at Coopers Stadium in Adelaide.
- Event: 2010–11 A-League
Adelaide United	North Queensland Fury
8	1
- Date: 21 January 2011
- Venue: Hindmarsh Stadium, Adelaide
- Referee: Peter Green (FFQ)
- Attendance: 10,986

The 2010–11 A-League match between Adelaide United and North Queensland Fury at Hindmarsh Stadium, Adelaide, took place on Friday, 21 January 2011. Adelaide United won 8–1, which at the time was the biggest win in the history of the competition.

North Queensland Fury disbanded at the end of the season, after finishing bottom of the table, whereas Adelaide United finished 3rd in the regular season, qualifying for the AFC Champions League qualifying play-off, and reaching the semi-finals of the finals series.

== Background ==
Going into round 24 of 30 of the 2010–11 A-League season, known as flood relief round, Adelaide United were fighting Central Coast Mariners for 2nd place, with league leaders Brisbane Roar out of sight, which would reward them with a spot in the upper semi-finals. Their last match saw them defeat rivals Melbourne Victory 4–1, their first win over Victory in nearly 3 years. At the other end of the table, North Queensland Fury were battling with Perth Glory and Sydney FC to avoid the wooden spoon. Prior to this match, North Queensland Fury had only defeated Adelaide United once in a competitive fixture, and this would be the final time the two teams would ever play each other.

== Pre-match ==
=== Team selection ===
Adelaide United made two changes to their starting line-up, after defeating their rivals Melbourne Victory 4–1, swapping out goalkeeper Mark Birighitti for Eugene Galekovic, and defender Robert Cornthwaite for Nigel Boogaard.

North Queensland Fury made four changes to the team that lost to fellow expansion side Gold Coast United 0–4, changing out Sebastian Usai, Lorenzo Sipi, Ramazan Tavsancioglu and Isaka Cernak for Justin Pasfield, Ufuk Talay, Jason Spagnuolo and David Williams.

== Match ==
=== Summary ===
Marcos Flores opened the scoring for Adelaide United after 4 minutes, with Travis Dodd doubling the lead at the 28th minute. Flores and Iain Ramsay scored at the 37th and 42nd minute to put Adelaide United 4–0 up at half time. Sergio van Dijk scored a second half hat-trick, and Marcos Flores scored his third in the second half, with North Queensland Fury midfielder Panny Nikas scoring a consolation goal at 6–1.

21 January 2011
20:00 ACDT

Adelaide United	8–1	North Queensland Fury
Flores 4', 37', 87'; Dodd 28'; Ramsay 42'; van Dijk 47', 67', 83'		Nikas 72'

Hindmarsh Stadium, Adelaide
Attendance: 10,986
Referee: Peter Green (FFQ)

Adelaide United	North Queensland Fury

GK	1	(Australia) Eugene Galekovic
RB	14	(Australia) Cameron Watson
CB	3	(Australia) Nigel Boogaard	(substituted off) 70'
CB	4	(Australia) Iain Fyfe
LB	6	(Brazil) Cássio
RM	8	(Australia) Adam Hughes
CM	10	(Argentina) Marcos Flores
LM	21	(Uruguay) Francisco Usúcar	(substituted off) 64'
RW	13	(Australia) Travis Dodd
CF	9	(Indonesia) Sergio van Dijk
RW	17	(Philippines) Iain Ramsay	(substituted off) 75'
Substitutions:
GK	20	(Australia) Mark Birighitti
MF	12	(Australia) Paul Reid	(substituted on) 64'
DF	2	(Australia) Robert Cornthwaite	(substituted on) 70'
FW	19	(Australia) Matthew Leckie	(substituted on) 75'
Head coach:
(Netherlands) Rini Coolen

GK	1	(Australia) Justin Pasfield
RB	2	(Australia) Jack Hingert
CB	5	(Wales) Mark Hughes
CB	4	(Togo) Eric Akoto
LB	13	(Germany) André Kilian	(substituted off) 46'
RM	12	(Australia) Panny Nikas
CM	6	(Australia) Ufuk Talay	(substituted off) 80'
CM	14	(Australia) Chris Grossman	(substituted off) 53'
LM	3	(Papua New Guinea) Brad McDonald
AM	11	(Australia) David Williams
CF	21	(Australia) Jason Spagnuolo
Substitutions:
GK	28	(Australia) Sebastian Usai
DF	19	(Australia) Isaka Cernak	(substituted on) 46'
MF	22	(Australia) Lorenzo Sipi	(substituted on) 60'
MF	18	(Australia) Brett Studman	(substituted on) 80'
Head coach:
(Czech Republic) František Straka

Assistant referees:
Daniel Goodwin (FFSA)
Curtis Wordsworth (FFSA)

Match rules

- 90 minutes
- Four named substitutions
- Maximum of three substitutions

== Aftermath ==
Adelaide United broke the record for the number of goals scored by a single team in a game, previously being six, the largest winning margin, and the most goals scored in a single game, which allowed them to regain second place from Central Coast Mariners. By the end of the season they fell back into third behind the Mariners after winning just one of their last four games. Defeating Wellington Phoenix in the first week of finals, their season ended with a 3–2 defeat to Gold Coast United in the semi-finals.

North Queensland Fury ended the season bottom of the table, losing all of their remaining games, capping off an 8-game losing streak and winning just 2 of their last 20. One month after the conclusion of the regular season, their A-League license was revoked and the club folded.
