= A-League transfers for 2010–11 season =

Transfer of season

This is a list of the transfers for the 2010–11 A-League season. It includes all transfers to an A-League club, but not all players leaving A-League clubs. Promotions from youth squads to the first squad of the same club are also not included.

Name	From	To	Date signed
(Australia) Nigel Boogaard	(Australia) Central Coast Mariners	(Australia) Adelaide United	6 November 2009
(Australia) Matt Thompson	(Australia) Newcastle Jets	(Australia) Melbourne Heart	24 November 2009
(Australia) Kristian Sarkies	(Australia) Adelaide United	(Australia) Melbourne Heart	24 November 2009
(Australia) Dean Heffernan	(Australia) Central Coast Mariners	(Australia) Melbourne Heart	26 November 2009
(Australia) Daniel McBreen	(Australia) North Queensland Fury	(Australia) Central Coast Mariners	8 December 2009
(Argentina) Marcos Flores	(Chile) Curicó Unido	(Australia) Adelaide United	8 December 2009
(Australia) Eli Babalj	(Australia) Australian Institute of Sport	(Australia) Melbourne Heart	26 December 2009
(Australia) Kamal Ibrahim	(Australia) Australian Institute of Sport	(Australia) Melbourne Heart	26 December 2009
(Australia) Jason Hoffman	(Australia) Newcastle Jets	(Australia) Melbourne Heart	8 January 2010
(Australia) Mustafa Amini	(Australia) Australian Institute of Sport	(Australia) Central Coast Mariners	12 January 2010
(Australia) Andrew Redmayne	(Australia) Central Coast Mariners	(Australia) Brisbane Roar	18 January 2010
(Australia) Adam Griffiths	(Saudi Arabia) Al-Shabab Riyadh	(Australia) Adelaide United	3 February 2010
(New Zealand) Kosta Barbarouses	(New Zealand) Wellington Phoenix	(Australia) Brisbane Roar	11 February 2010
(Australia) Clint Bolton	(Australia) Sydney FC	(Australia) Melbourne Heart	16 February 2010
(Netherlands) Rutger Worm	(Netherlands) N.E.C.	(Australia) Melbourne Heart	23 February 2010
(Australia) Erik Paartalu	(Scotland) Greenock Morton F.C.	(Australia) Brisbane Roar	24 February 2010
(Australia) John Tambouras	(Australia) North Queensland Fury	(China) Guangzhou Evergrande F.C.	2 March 2010
(Australia) Wayne Srhoj	(Australia) Perth Glory	(Australia) Melbourne Heart	6 March 2010
(Australia) Joshua Rose	(Romania) FC Universitatea Craiova	(Australia) Central Coast Mariners	8 March 2010
(Indonesia) Serginho van Dijk	(Australia) Brisbane Roar	(Australia) Adelaide United	14 March 2010
(Australia) Rostyn Griffiths	(Australia) North Queensland Fury	(Australia) Central Coast Mariners	14 March 2010
(Australia) Michael Theoklitos	(England) Norwich City F.C.	(Australia) Brisbane Roar	14 March 2010
(Australia) Simon Colosimo	(Australia) Sydney FC	(Australia) Melbourne Heart	19 March 2010
(Australia) Sam Gallagher	(Australia) Sydney FC	(Australia) Central Coast Mariners	19 March 2010
(Australia) Liam Reddy	(New Zealand) Wellington Phoenix	(Australia) Sydney FC	25 March 2010
(Australia) John Aloisi	(Australia) Sydney FC	(Australia) Melbourne Heart	29 March 2010
(New Zealand) Jeremy Brockie	(Australia) North Queensland Fury	(Australia) Newcastle Jets	1 April 2010
(Australia) Adam Sarota	(Australia) Brisbane Roar	(Netherlands) FC Utrecht	2 April 2010
(Australia) Thomas Oar	(Australia) Brisbane Roar	(Netherlands) FC Utrecht	2 April 2010
(Australia) Michael Zullo	(Australia) Brisbane Roar	(Netherlands) FC Utrecht	2 April 2010
(Australia) Ruben Zadkovich	(England) Derby County	(Australia) Newcastle Jets	6 April 2010
(Australia) Kasey Wehrman	(Norway) FC Lyn Oslo	(Australia) Newcastle Jets	8 April 2010
(Australia) Shane Stefanutto	(Australia) North Queensland Fury	(Australia) Brisbane Roar	13 April 2010
(Australia) Michael Baird	(Romania) FC Universitatea Craiova	(Australia) Perth Glory	15 April 2010
(Australia) Josh Mitchell	(Romania) FC Universitatea Craiova	(Australia) Perth Glory	15 April 2010
(Australia) Matt Smith	(Australia) North Queensland Fury	(Australia) Brisbane Roar	17 April 2010
(England) Robbie Fowler	(Australia) North Queensland Fury	(Australia) Perth Glory	27 April 2010
(Australia) Matthew Ham	(Australia) Brisbane Roar	(Australia) North Queensland Fury	29 April 2010
(Australia) Simon Storey	(Scotland) Airdrie United F.C.	(Australia) North Queensland Fury	29 April 2010
(Australia) Michael Marrone	(Australia) Adelaide United	(Australia) Melbourne Heart	30 April 2010
(Australia) Rocky Visconte	(Scotland) Heart of Midlothian F.C.	(Australia) Brisbane Roar	6 May 2010
(Australia) Chris Payne	(Australia) Sydney FC	(Australia) Manly United F.C.	7 May 2010
(Australia) Beau Busch	(Australia) North Queensland Fury	(Australia) Manly United F.C.	7 May 2010
(Australia) Oliver Bozanic	(England) Reading F.C.	(Australia) Central Coast Mariners	10 May 2010
(Brazil) Alex	(Brazil) Rio Branco Esporte Clube	(Australia) Melbourne Heart	10 May 2010
(Germany) Thomas Broich	(Germany) 1. FC Nürnberg	(Australia) Brisbane Roar	11 May 2010
(Australia) Mitchell Langerak	(Australia) Melbourne Victory	(Germany) Borussia Dortmund	12 May 2010
(Australia) Dylan Macallister	(Australia) Central Coast Mariners	(New Zealand) Wellington Phoenix	13 May 2010
(Australia) Paul Henderson	(Australia) North Queensland Fury	(Australia) Sydney Olympic F.C.	15 May 2010
(Australia) Michael Beauchamp	(United Arab Emirates) Al-Jazira Club	(Australia) Melbourne Heart	17 May 2010
(Netherlands) Patrick Zwaanswijk	(Netherlands) NAC Breda	(Australia) Central Coast Mariners	19 May 2010
(Australia) Josip Skoko	(Croatia) HNK Hajduk Split	(Australia) Melbourne Heart	19 May 2010
(Australia) Scott Jamieson	(Australia) Adelaide United	(Australia) Sydney FC	21 May 2010
(Netherlands) Gerald Sibon	(Netherlands) SC Heerenveen	(Australia) Melbourne Heart	21 May 2010
(Australia) Adam Casey	(Australia) Sydney FC	(Australia) North Queensland Fury	21 May 2010
(Germany) André Kilian	(Germany) FC Schalke 04 II	(Australia) North Queensland Fury	21 May 2010
(Australia) Brett Studman	(Australia) Bankstown City Lions F.C.	(Australia) North Queensland Fury	24 May 2010
(Australia) Nick Carle	(England) Crystal Palace F.C.	(Australia) Sydney FC	26 May 2010
(Australia) Panny Nikas	(Australia) Sutherland Sharks F.C.	(Australia) North Queensland Fury	1 June 2010
(Australia) Isaka Cernak	(Australia) Brisbane Roar	(Australia) North Queensland Fury	4 June 2010
(Australia) Adam Griffiths	(Australia) Adelaide United	(China) Hangzhou Nabel Greentown F.C.	8 June 2010
(Australia) Milan Susak	(Germany) SpVgg Unterhaching	(Australia) Brisbane Roar	10 June 2010
(Australia) Jonathan McKain	(New Zealand) Wellington Phoenix	(Saudi Arabia) Al-Nassr	14 June 2010
(England) John Curtis	(England) Northampton Town F.C.	(Australia) Gold Coast United	16 June 2010
(Australia) Gareth Edds	(England) Tranmere Rovers F.C.	(Australia) North Queensland Fury	23 June 2010
(Australia) Chris Payne	(Australia) Manly United F.C.	(Australia) North Queensland Fury	28 June 2010
(Australia) Danny Vukovic	(Australia) Central Coast Mariners	(Turkey) Konyaspor	28 June 2010
(South Korea) Song Jin-Hyung	(Australia) Newcastle Jets	(France) Tours FC	28 June 2010
(England) Mark Hughes	(England) Walsall F.C.	(Australia) North Queensland Fury	28 June 2010
(Togo) Eric Akoto	(Greece) OFI	(Australia) North Queensland Fury	5 July 2010
(China) Zhang Shuo	(Indonesia) Persik Kediri	(Australia) Newcastle Jets	6 July 2010
(Italy) Marcello Fiorentini	(Italy) Palazzolo	(Australia) Newcastle Jets	6 July 2010
(Costa Rica) Jean Carlos Solórzano	(Costa Rica) LD Alajuelense	(Australia) Brisbane Roar	15 July 2010
(Australia) Jess Vanstrattan	(Australia) Gold Coast United	(Australia) Central Coast Mariners	19 July 2010
(New Zealand) Glen Moss	(Australia) Melbourne Victory	(Australia) Gold Coast United	19 July 2010
(Japan) Hirofumi Moriyasu	(Australia) APIA Leichhardt Tigers	(Australia) Sydney FC	21 July 2010
(Argentina) Oscar Roberto Cornejo	(Chile) CD Everton	(New Zealand) Wellington Phoenix	29 July 2010
(Australia) Mirjan Pavlovic	(Australia) Sydney United FC	(New Zealand) Wellington Phoenix	29 July 2010
(Australia) Jade North	(Norway) Tromsø IL	(New Zealand) Wellington Phoenix	30 July 2010
(Uganda) Eugene Sseppuya	(Lithuania) FK Sūduva	(Australia) North Queensland Fury	1 August 2010
(England) Geoff Kellaway	(Australia) Dandenong Thunder SC	(Australia) Melbourne Victory	17 August 2010
(Australia) Griffin McMaster	(Australia) Oakleigh Cannons	(New Zealand) Wellington Phoenix	18 August 2010
(Brazil) Ricardinho	(Brazil) Oeste Futebol Clube	(Australia) Melbourne Victory	19 August 2010
(Australia) Danny Vukovic	(Turkey) Konyaspor	(New Zealand) Wellington Phoenix	23 August 2010
(Brazil) Bruno Cazarine Constantino	(Brazil) Vila Nova Futebol Clube	(Australia) Sydney FC	27 August 2010
(Australia) Bruce Djite	(Turkey) Gençlerbirliği	(Australia) Gold Coast United	28 August 2010
(Australia) Nick Ward	(Australia) Melbourne Victory	(New Zealand) Wellington Phoenix	1 September 2010
(England) Francis Jeffers	(England) Sheffield Wednesday	(Australia) Newcastle Jets	29 October 2010^{1}
(New Zealand) Simon Elliott	Free agent	(New Zealand) Wellington Phoenix	1 November 2010
(South Korea) Inseob Shin	(Australia) Adelaide United	(South Korea) Busan I'Park	9 November 2010^{2}
(Australia) Ryan Griffiths	(China) Beijing Guoan	(Australia) Newcastle Jets	18 November 2010^{2}
(Finland) Juho Mäkelä	(Finland) HJK Helsinki	(Australia) Sydney FC	11 December 2010^{2}
(Uruguay) Francisco Usúcar	(Uruguay) Central Espanol	(Australia) Adelaide United	14 December 2010^{2}
(Brazil) (Australia) Reinaldo	(Australia) Brisbane Roar	(Qatar) Al-Ahli	15 December 2010
(Netherlands) Andwélé Slory	(Bulgaria) Levski Sofia	(Australia) Adelaide United	20 December 2010^{1,2}
(Germany) Peter Perchtold	(Germany) 1. FC Nürnberg	(Australia) Gold Coast United	22 December 2010
(Australia) Danny Allsopp	(United States) D.C. United	(Australia) Melbourne Victory	24 December 2010^{2}
(Australia) Adrian Zahra	(Australia) Melbourne Knights (VPL)	(Australia) Melbourne Heart	29 December 2010
(Costa Rica) Diego Estrada	(Costa Rica) LD Alajuelense	(Australia) Adelaide United	31 December 2010^{2}
(Australia) Michael Baird	(Australia) Perth Glory	(Australia) Central Coast Mariners	6 January 2011
(Australia) Shane Smeltz	(Turkey) Gençlerbirliği	(Australia) Gold Coast United	10 January 2011
(South Korea) Kim Sung-Kil	(South Korea) Busan Kyotong	(Australia) Gold Coast United	15 January 2011
(Australia) Iain Fyfe	(Australia) Adelaide United	(South Korea) Busan I'Park	15 January 2011
(Australia) Osama Malik	(Australia) North Queensland Fury	(Australia) Adelaide United	17 January 2011
(Croatia) Dario Bodrušić	(Croatia) NK Istra 1961	(Australia) Adelaide United	18 January 2011
(Ghana) Lloyd Owusu	(Australia) Adelaide United	(England) Luton Town	18 January 2011
(Australia) Alex Brosque	(Australia) Sydney FC	(Japan) Shimizu S-Pulse	31 January 2011
(Australia) Luke DeVere	(Australia) Brisbane Roar	(South Korea) Gyeongnam FC	20 January 2011
(England) Francis Jeffers	(Australia) Newcastle Jets	(Scotland) Motherwell	8 February 2011
(Australia) David Williams	(Australia) North Queensland Fury	(Australia) Sydney FC (loan)	17 February 2011^{3}
(Australia) Andrew Durante	(New Zealand) Wellington Phoenix	(Australia) Sydney FC (loan)	21 February 2011^{4}

^{1} Player on 10 match Guest contract with club.
^{2} Players who sign before transfer window will join new club on 1 January 2011.
^{3} Player on a six-month contract with Sydney FC for their AFC Champions League campaign and then will return to the Fury.
^{4} Player on a three-month contract with Sydney FC for their AFC Champions League campaign and then will return to the Phoenix.
