= 2009–10 North Queensland Fury FC season =

Coordinates: 19°18′58″S 146°42′43″E

North Queensland Fury
2009–10 season
- Manager: Ian Ferguson
- A-League: 7th
- Average home league attendance: 6,723
Home colours	Away colours

The 2009–10 season was the inaugural season of North Queensland Fury. It began on 1 May 2009 and concluded on 30 April 2010, with competitive matches played in the A-League between August and February. The club finished the 2009–10 A-League in seventh place, with eight wins, eight draws and eleven losses, narrowly missing qualification for the finals series.

The Fury signed former Scottish international Ian Ferguson to be their inaugural manager, while former Liverpool and England forward Robbie Fowler was the team's marquee player.

A slow start to the A-League season saw the team fail to win any of its first five games, and record only one win in their first eleven matches. The Fury's form improved in the second half of the season, winning seven of their remaining sixteen games.

27 players represented the club in the A-League and there were 10 different goalscorers. The team's top scorer was Fowler, who scored 9 goals in 26 games.

== Backgrounds ==
=== Transfers ===
In

No.	Position	Player	Transferred from	Fee	Date	Ref
	FW	Jeremy Brockie	Unattached	Free transfer	14 November 2008	
	DF	Robbie Middleby	Sydney FC	Free transfer	14 November 2008	
11	FW	Brendon Santalab	Sydney FC	Free transfer	14 November 2008	
	DF	Jacob Timpano	Sydney FC	Free transfer	14 November 2008	
	MF	Jason Spagnuolo	Unattached	Free agent	23 December 2008	
	MF	Chris Grossman	Queensland Roar	Free transfer	24 December 2008	
	MF	Fred Agius	Adelaide City	Undisclosed	25 December 2008	
9	FW	Robbie Fowler	Unattached	Free transfer	4 February 2009	
	DF	Scott Wilson	Dunfermline Athletic	Free transfer	6 March 2009	
19	FW	Daniel McBreen	York City	Free transfer	27 May 2009	
	MF	Rostyn Griffiths	Unattached	Free transfer	1 July 2009	
1	GK	Paul Henderson	Unattached	Free transfer	5 August 2009	
19	DF	Jimmy Downey	Perth Glory	Swap for Daniel McBreen	14 January 2010	

Out

No.	Position	Player	Transferred to	Fee	Date	Ref
	MF	Felipe	Al Raed	Undisclosed	16 June 2009	
11	FW	Brendon Santalab	Chengdu Blades	Undisclosed	22 July 2009	
19	FW	Daniel McBreen	Perth Glory	Swap for Jimmy Downey	14 January 2010	

Loans in

No.	Position	Player	Loaned from	Date	Loan expired	Ref
	FW	David Williams	15 July 2009	Brøndby	End of the season	

== Players ==
=== First team squad ===
Note: Flags indicate national team as defined under FIFA eligibility rules; some limited exceptions apply. Players may hold more than one non-FIFA nationality.

No.	Pos.	Nation	Player
1	GK	AUS	Paul Henderson
2	DF	AUS	Robbie Middleby
3	DF	AUS	Chris Tadrosse
4	DF	SCO	Scott Wilson
5	DF	AUS	Jacob Timpano
6	MF	AUS	Ufuk Talay
7	MF	AUS	Jason Spagnuolo
8	DF	AUS	Shane Stefanutto
9	FW	ENG	Robbie Fowler
10	FW	NZL	Jeremy Brockie
11	FW	AUS	David Williams
12	DF	SRI	Jack Hingert (Youth)
13	DF	AUS	Beau Busch
14	MF	AUS	Chris Grossman

No.	Pos.	Nation	Player
15	MF	AUS	Fred Agius
16	MF	AUS	Paul Kohler
17	MF	AUS	Osama Malik (Youth)
18	FW	ENG	James Robinson
19	MF	AUS	James Downey
20	GK	AUS	Justin Pasfield
21	DF	AUS	John Tambouras
22	DF	AUS	Karl Dodd
23	MF	AUS	Rostyn Griffiths (Youth)
24	FW	ANT	Dyron Daal (Injury replacement player*)
25	DF	JPN	Kojiro Kaimoto
26	DF	AUS	Matt Smith (Injury replacement player**)
27	MF	ENG	Terry Cooke (Injury replacement player***)

- * Injury replacement player for Scott Wilson.
- ** Injury replacement player for Shane Stefanutto.
- *** Injury replacement player for James Robinson.

== Matches ==
=== Pre-season friendlies ===
31 May 2009	Tampines Rovers (Singapore)	1 : 0	(Australia) North Queensland Fury	Jalan Besar Stadium
17:00 UTC+8	Yunus 76'	Report		Attendance: 3,000

14 June 2009	North Queensland Fury (Australia)	0 : 4	(Australia) Brisbane Roar	Sologinkin Oval, Mackay
19:00 UTC+10		Report	Murdocca 6'; Dodd 20' van Dijk 40'; Cernak 74'

23 June 2009	Gold Coast United (Australia)	2 : 0	(Australia) North Queensland Fury	Skilled Park
17:00 UTC+10	Pantelidis 85'; Lustica 89'	Report		Attendance: 3,000

27 June 2009	Sydney FC (Australia)	4 : 0	(Australia) North Queensland Fury	Shark Park
17:00 UTC+8	Corica 7'; Gan 47'; Danning 71'; McFlynn 87'	(Report)		Attendance: 5,283; Referee: Kris Griffiths-Jones

2 July 2009	North Queensland Fury (Australia)	3 : 2	(Australia) Adelaide United	Darwin Football Stadium
17:00 UTC+9:30	Spagnuolo 15'; Agius 23', 60'	Report	Costa 39'; Alemao 50'	Attendance: 2,547

15 July 2009	North Queensland Fury (Australia)	1 : 2	(England) Wolverhampton	Members Equity Stadium
17:15 UTC+8	Fowler 66' (pen.)		Keogh 2'; Craddock 74'	Attendance: 14,903

18 July 2009	Perth Glory (Australia)	1 : 0	(Australia) North Queensland Fury	Hyundai Stadium, Mandurah
15:00 UTC+8	Harnwell 17'	Report		Attendance: 2,780

26 July 2009	North Queensland Fury (Australia)	1 : 0	(Australia) Brisbane Roar	Tony Ireland Stadium, Townsville
15:00 UTC+10			Moore 66' (own)	Attendance: 6,000

=== 2009-10 Hyundai A-League fixtures ===
8 August 2009	North Queensland Fury	2 : 3	Sydney FC	Dairy Farmers Stadium, Townsville
17:30 UTC+10	R. Griffiths 41'; Fowler 60' (pen.)	Report; Summary	Aloisi 4', 73' (pen.); Danning 28'	Attendance: 8,897; Referee: (Australia) Strebre Delovski

15 August 2009	Gold Coast United	5 : 0	North Queensland Fury	Skilled Park, Gold Coast
17:30 UTC+10	Smeltz 30', 54' (pen.), 63', 64'; Minniecon 80'	Report; Summary		Attendance: 7,526; Referee: (Australia) Chris Beath

22 August 2009	North Queensland Fury	0 : 1	Melbourne Victory	Dairy Farmers Stadium, Townsville
17:00 UTC+10		Report; Summary	A. Thompson 45'	Attendance: 6,514; Referee: (Australia) Peter Green

28 August 2009	Adelaide United	3 : 3	North Queensland Fury	Hindmarsh Stadium, Adelaide
19:30 UTC+9:30	Pantelis 23', 90+3' (pen.); Owusu 34'	Report; Summary	Fowler 5'; Daal 84'; McBreen 87'	Attendance: 10,773; Referee: (Australia) Peter Green

5 September 2009	North Queensland Fury	1 : 1	Brisbane Roar	Dairy Farmers Stadium, Townsville
19:00 UTC+10	Fowler 7'; Kohler (yellow card) 28' (yellow-red card) 31'	Report; Summary	Nichols 85'	Attendance: 7,173; Referee: (Australia) Matthew Breeze

12 September 2009	Sydney FC	0 : 1	North Queensland Fury	Sydney Football Stadium, Sydney
19:30 UTC+10		Report; Summary	Fowler 54'	Attendance: 16,699; Referee: (Australia) Chris Beath

20 September 2009	Wellington Phoenix	1 : 1	North Queensland Fury	Westpac Stadium, Wellington
15:00 UTC+12	Bertos 6'	Report; Summary	Grossman 90+4'	Attendance: 9,713; Referee: (Australia) Peter Green

27 September 2009	North Queensland Fury	0 : 2	Adelaide United	Dairy Farmers Stadium, Townsville
17:00 UTC+10		Report; Summary	Pantelis 60'; Leckie 90+2'	Attendance: 6,745; Referee: (Australia) Chris Beath

3 October 2009	Perth Glory	1 : 1	North Queensland Fury	ME Bank Stadium, Perth
15:30 UTC+8	Sterjovski 49' (pen.)	Report; Summary	Talay (yellow card) 24' (yellow-red card) 45'; Velaphi 70' (o.g.)	Attendance: 12,822; Referee: (Australia) Ben Williams

11 October 2009	Central Coast Mariners	1 : 1	North Queensland Fury	Bluetongue Stadium, Gosford
15:00 UTC+11	Simon 1'	Report; Summary	McBreen 75'	Attendance: 8,042; Referee: (Australia) Ryan Shepheard

17 October 2009	North Queensland Fury	1 : 1	Wellington Phoenix	Dairy Farmers Stadium, Townsville
19:30 UTC+10	Fowler 84'	Report; Summary	T. Brown 6'	Attendance: 6,191; Referee: (Australia) Chris Beath

24 October 2009	North Queensland Fury	2 : 1	Perth Glory	Dairy Farmers Stadium, Townsville
19:30 UTC+10	Fowler 65'; Daal 71'	Report; Summary	Sikora 25'	Attendance: 6,332; Referee: (Australia) Peter Green

31 October 2009	Gold Coast United	0 : 2	North Queensland Fury	Skilled Park, Gold Coast
20:00 UTC+10		Report; Summary	Fowler 64', 76' (pen.)	Attendance: 2,616; Referee: (Australia) Craig Zetter

8 November 2009	Newcastle Jets	2 : 0	North Queensland Fury	EnergyAustralia Stadium, Newcastle
17:00 UTC+11	M. Thompson 55'; Bridges 85' (pen.)	Report; Summary		Attendance: 6,271; Referee: (Australia) Ryan Shepheard

21 November 2009	North Queensland Fury	1 : 5	Central Coast Mariners	Dairy Farmers Stadium, Townsville
20:00 UTC+10	R. Griffiths 68'	Report; Summary	Bojić 22'; Mrdja 35', 59'; A. Elrich 62'; Hutchinson 82'	Attendance: 7,587; Referee: (Australia) Gerard Parsons

28 November 2009	North Queensland Fury	2 : 1	Adelaide United	Dairy Farmers Stadium, Townsville
20:00 UTC+10	McBreen 38'; Fowler 67'	Report; Summary	Cristiano 90+2'	Attendance: 5,356; Referee: (Australia) Peter Green

5 December 2009	Sydney FC	4 : 1	North Queensland Fury	Sydney Football Stadium, Sydney
19:00 UTC+11	Aloisi 13'; Brosque 19', 58'; Corica 64'	Report; Summary	R. Griffiths 61'	Attendance: 11,871; Referee: (Australia) Ben Williams

11 December 2009	North Queensland Fury	1 : 0	Perth Glory	Dairy Farmers Stadium, Townsville
19:30 UTC+10	Williams 32'	Report; Summary		Attendance: 5,287; Referee: (Australia) Peter Green

16 December 2009	Brisbane Roar	2 : 0	North Queensland Fury	Suncorp Stadium, Brisbane
19:30 UTC+10	van Dijk 20', 42'	Report; Summary		Attendance: 11,530; Referee: (Australia) Matthew Gillett

20 December 2009	Newcastle Jets	3 : 2	North Queensland Fury	EnergyAustralia Stadium, Newcastle
17:00 UTC+11	Tadrosse 24' (o.g.); Song 38'; Petrovski 83'	Report; Summary	Daal 44', 61'	Attendance: 7,026; Referee: (Australia) Gerard Parsons

27 December 2009	North Queensland Fury	1 : 0	Melbourne Victory	Dairy Farmers Stadium, Townsville
20:00 UTC+10	Daal 31'	Report; Summary		Attendance: 7,031; Referee: (Australia) Peter Green

9 January 2010	Central Coast Mariners	1 : 1	North Queensland Fury	Bluetongue Stadium, Gosford
19:00 UTC+11	Mrdja 3'	Report; Summary	Brockie 20'	Attendance: 6,556; Referee: (Australia) Ryan Shepheard

15 January 2010	Wellington Phoenix	3 : 0	North Queensland Fury	Westpac Stadium, Wellington
19:30 UTC+13	Dadi 47'; Ifill 78'; McKain 90'	Report; Summary		Attendance: 7,727; Referee: (Australia) Peter Green

23 January 2010	North Queensland Fury	1 : 1	Brisbane Roar	Dairy Farmers Stadium, Townsville
20:00 UTC+10	Williams 55'	Report; Summary	DeVere 49'	Attendance: 7,610; Referee: (Australia) Gerard Parsons

2 February 2010	North Queensland Fury	2 : 1	Newcastle Jets	Dairy Farmers Stadium, Townsville
19:30 UTC+10	Grossman 39'; Tadrosse 81'	Report; Summary	M. Thompson 19'	Attendance: 4,156; Referee: (Australia) Chris Beath

5 February 2010	Melbourne Victory	2 : 0	North Queensland Fury	Etihad Stadium, Melbourne
20:00 UTC+11	Hernández 36', 66'	Report; Summary		Attendance: 22,726; Referee: (Australia) Ben Williams

13 February 2010	North Queensland Fury	2 : 1	Gold Coast United	Dairy Farmers Stadium, Townsville
20:00 UTC+10	Williams 9'; Cooke 83'	Report; Summary	J. Porter 62'	Attendance: 8,517; Referee: (Australia) Ben Williams

Pos	Team	Pld	W	D	L	GF	GA	GD	Pts	Qualification
1	Sydney FC (C)	27	15	3	9	35	23	+12	48	Qualification for 2011 AFC Champions League group stage and Finals series
2	Melbourne Victory	27	14	5	8	47	32	+15	47	Qualification for 2011 AFC Champions League group stage and Finals series
3	Gold Coast United	27	13	5	9	39	35	+4	44	Qualification for Finals series
4	Wellington Phoenix	27	10	10	7	37	29	+8	40	Qualification for Finals series
5	Perth Glory	27	11	6	10	40	34	+6	39	Qualification for Finals series
6	Newcastle Jets	27	10	4	13	33	45	−12	34	Qualification for Finals series
7	North Queensland Fury	27	8	8	11	29	46	−17	32	
8	Central Coast Mariners	27	7	9	11	32	29	+3	30	
9	Brisbane Roar	27	8	6	13	32	42	−10	30	
10	Adelaide United	27	7	8	12	24	33	−9	29	

Source: ultimatealeague.com
Rules for classification: 1) points; 2) goal difference; 3) number of goals scored.
(C) Champions

== Player statistics ==
The Fury used a total of 27 players during the 2009–10 season and there were 10 different goalscorers. There were also two squad members who did not make a first-team appearance in the campaign. Fowler featured in 26 matches – the most of any Fury player in the campaign, only missing one game.

The team scored a total of 29 goals. The highest scorer was Fowler, with 9 goals, followed by Daal who scored 5 goals. Two Fury players were sent off during the season: Kohler and Talay.

Key

No. = Squad number

Pos = Playing position

Nat. = Nationality

Apps = Appearances

GK = Goalkeeper

DF = Defender

MF = Midfielder

FW = Forward

= Yellow cards

= Red cards

Numbers in parentheses denote appearances as substitute. Players with name struck through and marked † left the club during the playing season.

No.	Pos.	Nat.	Name	Total		Discipline	
No.	Pos.	Nat.	Name	Apps	Goals	A yellow rectangular card	A red rectangular card
1	GK	AUS	Paul Henderson	14	0	1	0
2	DF	AUS	Robbie Middleby	21	0	2	0
3	DF	AUS	Chris Tadrosse	23	1	1	0
4	DF	SCO	Scott Wilson	3(1)	0	1	0
5	DF	AUS	Jacob Timpano	0	0	0	0
6	MF	AUS	Ufuk Talay	11	0	4	1
7	MF	AUS	Jason Spagnuolo	8(11)	0	2	0
8	DF	AUS	Shane Stefanutto	7	0	1	0
9	FW	ENG	Robbie Fowler	26	9	3	0
10	FW	NZL	Jeremy Brockie	9(5)	1	1	0
11	FW	AUS	David Williams	14(7)	3	1	0
12	DF	SRI	Jack Hingert	6(1)	0	1	0
13	DF	AUS	Beau Busch	8	0	2	0
14	MF	AUS	Chris Grossman	13(8)	2	1	0
15	MF	AUS	Fred Agius	2(3)	0	0	0
16	MF	AUS	Paul Kohler	10(11)	0	5	1
17	DF	AUS	Osama Malik	4(2)	0	0	0
18	FW	ENG	James Robinson	12(1)	0	0	0
19	DF	AUS	Jimmy Downey	4	0	0	0
19	FW	AUS	Daniel McBreen	16(5)	3	4	0
20	GK	AUS	Justin Pasfield	13	0	0	0
21	DF	AUS	John Tambouras	24	1	1	0
22	DF	AUS	Karl Dodd	8	0	1	0
23	MF	AUS	Rostyn Griffiths	21(2)	2	6	0
24	FW	ANT	Dyron Daal	7(14)	5	4	0
25	DF	JPN	Kojiro Kaimoto	1(1)	0	0	0
26	DF	ENG	Matt Smith	11	0	1	0
27	MF	ENG	Terry Cooke	4(6)	2	0	0
