= North Queensland (disambiguation) =

North Queensland is a region of northern Queensland. It may also refer to:

- Far North Queensland, the region to the north of North Queensland covering the northernmost tip of the state
- North Queensland Cowboys, a rugby league team based in Townsville
  - North Queensland Cowboys Women, the women's team
  - North Queensland Young Guns, the former feeder team
- North Queensland Fury, a former soccer club based in Townsville, later known as Northern Fury FC
  - North Queensland Razorbacks FC, the club's former feeder club
- North Queensland Stadium, a rugby league stadium in Townsville
- State of North Queensland, a proposed state encompassing the northern half of Queensland
