= Matthew Ham =

Australian soccer player

Matt Ham
Personal information
- Full name: Matthew Ham
- Date of birth: 25 July 1983 (age 43)
- Place of birth: Ayr, Australia
- Height: 1.94 m (6 ft 4 in)
- Position: Goalkeeper

Team information
- Current team: Saints Eagles Souths FC

Youth career
- Burdekin

Senior career*
| Years | Team | Apps | (Gls) |
| 2005–2006 | Eastern Suburbs | | |
| 2006–2007 | Brisbane Wolves | | |
| 2007–2008 | Brisbane Roar | 0 | (0) |
| 2008 | → Redlands United (loan) | 5 | (0) |
| 2009 | Brisbane Olympic | | |
| 2009 | North Queensland Fury | 0 | (0) |
| 2009–2010 | Brisbane Roar | 5 | (0) |
| 2010–2011 | North Queensland Fury | 0 | (0) |
| 2014–2015 | Southside Eagles | 28 | (0) |
| 2023- | Saints Eagles Souths FC | 1 | (0) |
- * Club domestic league appearances and goals as of 16:47, 17 November 2010 (UTC)

Matthew Ham (born 25 July 1983) is an Australian goalkeeper.

== Club career ==
He was signed by the Queensland Roar for the 2007-2008 A-league season. He sustained a season ending shoulder injury during pre-season training, and was told he would need a full shoulder reconstruction. His replacement, Griffin McMaster, went on to have a solid season, as No. 2 for the Roar, in his stead. Early into the 2009-10 A-league season, he was signed by the North Queensland Fury for three weeks as an injury replacement for Justin Pasfield. On 16 December 2009 he was re-signed by the Roar having spent two seasons in the Queensland State League, replacing Liam Reddy after he moved to Wellington Phoenix. He was later signed by North Queensland Fury FC ahead of the 2010–11 season. He will compete with Justin Pasfield for the number 1 jersey.
