= Ramazan Tavşancıoğlu =

Australian soccer player

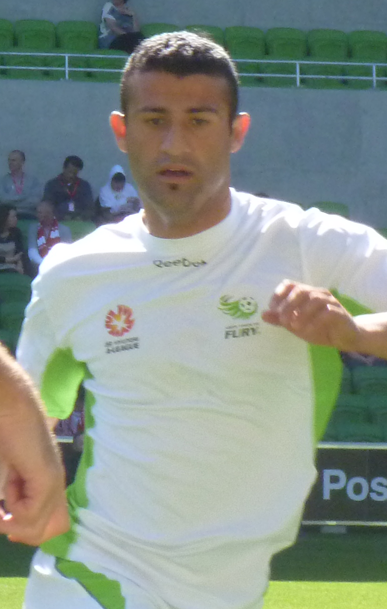

Personal information
- Full name: Ramazan Tavşancıoğlu
- Date of birth: 7 June 1984 (age 42)
- Place of birth: Melbourne, Australia
- Height: 1.84 m (6 ft 1/2 in)
- Position: Defender

Youth career
- 2002–2003: Melbourne Knights

Senior career*
Years	Team	Apps	(Gls)
2003	Port Melbourne Sharks	10	(0)
2003–2005	Ankaragücü	1	(0)
2005–2011	South Melbourne	136	(7)
2006	→ Melbourne Victory (loan)	4	(0)
2010–2011	→ North Queensland Fury (loan)	12	(0)
2011–2012	Oakleigh Cannons	40	(0)
2013	Southern Stars	20	(0)
2014–2015	Dandenong Thunder	46	(1)
2016	Hume City	25	(0)
2017–2018	Avondale FC	53	(1)
2019–2020	Oakleigh Cannons	33	(0)
2021	Altona Magic	7	(0)
2021	Nunawading City	7	(0)
2022–	Langwarrin SC	7	(0)
- * Club domestic league appearances and goals as of 25 November 2022

Ramazan Tavşancıoğlu (born 7 June 1984) is an Australian soccer player who plays for Nunawading City FC in the National Premier Leagues Victoria 3. He plays as a defender.

== Club career ==
A youth player at the Melbourne Knights, in 2003 Tavşancıoğlu received a two-week trial with Turkish Super League club Ankaragücü. After impressing coaching staff at the club he signed a four-year deal. However, he left at the conclusion of the first year of his contract after feeling unsettled, making just one appearance in his time at the club.

Upon returning to Australia, Tavşancıoğlu began playing with South Melbourne in the Victorian Premier League. Tavsancioglu was invited to join A-League club Melbourne Victory on a short-term contract on 30 December 2005. He played four games as a back-up player for the Victory due to injuries to regular squad members, before recommencing his tenure with South Melbourne in the VPL, where he played in South Melbourne's victory over Altona Magic in the 2006 Grand Final.

After a successful trial, he was signed as a short-term injury replacement by A-League outfit North Queensland Fury in November 2010 after a five-year hiatus from the league to provide defensive cover for the injured Eric Akoto and Chris Grossman.

He spent the 2011 and 2012 VPL seasons with Oakleigh Cannons, 2013 with Southern Stars FC and then the first two years of the new NPL league with Dandenong Thunder SC.

After Thunder's relegation from the top flight at the end of 2015, Rama then signed for ambitious league heavyweight Hume City FC.

== Honours ==
With South Melbourne:

- (Australia) Victorian Premier League Championship: 2006
- NPL Victoria Team of the Week Round 2 2017
