= Jacob Timpano =

Australian footballer (born 1986)

Personal information
- Full name: Jacob Timpano
- Date of birth: 3 January 1986 (age 40)
- Place of birth: Wollongong, Australia
- Height: 1.89 m (6 ft 2 in)
- Position: Centre back

Youth career
- Fernhill
- Illawarra
- Wollongong Wolves
- 2001–2002: NSWIS

Senior career*
Years	Team	Apps	(Gls)
2002–2004	Wollongong Wolves	25	(1)
2005–2009	Sydney FC	26	(1)
2009–2010	North Queensland Fury	0	(0)
2010	→ Nth Qld Razorbacks (loan)	0	(0)
2010	Sydney United	4	(0)
2011–2014	South Coast Wolves	64	(0)
2015	Dapto Dandaloo Fury	0	(0)

International career^{‡}
2003	Australia U17		
2005	Australia U20		
2006	Australia U23	3	(0)

Managerial career
- 2015–2018: Wollongong Wolves
- * Club domestic league appearances and goals as of 17.9.14 ‡ National team caps and goals as of 17 December 2007

Jacob Timpano (born 3 January 1986) is a former Australian footballer and current head coach of Wollongong Wolves in the National Premier Leagues NSW.

== Club career ==
Timpano previously played for the Wollongong Wolves in the National Soccer League. He is a central defender, and has represented Australia at the 2005 FIFA World Youth Championship and captained Australia in the 2003 FIFA U-17 World Championship as an Under-20 and Under-17 respectively.

In the 2005-06 A-League season, Timpano was an essential part of Sydney FC championship-winning side - playing in 19 of the club's 24 games. However, in the 2006-07 A-League season, Timpano made only 2 appearances (1 start) due to persistent leg injuries which continued into the start of season 2007/08. By the time Timpano recovered full fitness he found himself out of favour with the new coach only playing another 3 games for Sydney before he left the club.

In 2009, Timpano signed a two-year deal to be part of the new North Queensland Fury's inaugural A-League squad alongside current Sydney FC teammates, Robbie Middleby, Brendon Šantalab and Beau Busch. However, he once again found himself the 4th choice defensive option and remained unused throughout the season, much of which he spent on loan at Queensland League club North Queensland Razorbacks.

At the end of the season, Jacob was one of the players controversially released by the club despite being under contract. After being released, Jacob went back to New South Wales to play for Sydney United in the NSW Premier League.

He signed for South Coast Wolves after transferring from Sydney United ahead of the 2011 NSW Premier League season.

Timpano left South Coast Wolves, signing for Dapto Dandaloo Fury ahead of their 2015 Illawarra Premier League campaign. He was announced as one of six new signings for the club. He will play with several former A-League players, including Noel Spencer, Alvin Ceccoli, Shane Lyons, and Wade Oostendorp.

== International career ==
During 2006, Timpano was selected and captained the Australian Under 23's national football team in their campaign for the 2008 Summer Olympics, and played in all three international matches that year against Iran, Vietnam and Uzbekistan.

== Managerial career ==
Timpano was appointed manager of his former New South Wales NPL club Wollongong Wolves following the resignation of Nahuel Arrarte, midway through the 2015 NSW NPL season.

== Career statistics ==
=== Club ===
As of 5 January 2019

Club	Season	League (Note: A-League statistics include final series matches)			Continental (Note: All appearance(s) in O-League or AFC Champions League)		Other (Note: Includes the OFC Club Championship Qualifying Tournament, A-League Pre-Season Challenge Cup, FIFA Club World Cup, and Pan-Pacific Championship)		Total	
Club	Season	Division	Apps	Goals	Apps	Goals	Apps	Goals	Apps	Goals
Wollongong Wolves	2002–03	NSL	6	1	–	–	–	–	6	1
Wollongong Wolves	2003–04	NSL	19	0	–	–	–	–	19	0
Wollongong Wolves	Total		25	1	–	–	–	–	25	1
Sydney FC	2005–06	A-League	21	0	0	0	5 (Note: OFC Club Championship Qualifying Tournament 1, Pre-Season Cup 4)	0	26	0
Sydney FC	2006–07	A-League	2	0	0	0	0	0	2	0
Sydney FC	2007–08	A-League	0	0	–		3 (Note: Pre-Season Cup 1, Pan-Pacific Championship 2)	0	3	0
Sydney FC	2008–09	A-League	3	0	–		3 (Note: Pre-Season Cup 3)	0	6	0
Sydney FC	Total		26	0	0	0	11	0	37	0
North Queensland Fury	2009–10	A-League	0	0	–		–		0	0
Wollongong Wolves	2011	NSW Premier League								
Wollongong Wolves	2012	NSW Premier League								
Wollongong Wolves	2013	NPL NSW 1								
Wollongong Wolves	2014	NPL NSW 1	8	0	0	0	0	0	8	0
Wollongong Wolves	Total		8	0	0	0	0	0	8	0
Career Total			59	1	0	0	11	0	70	0

== Honours ==
With Sydney FC:

- (Australia) A-League Championship: 2005-2006
- Oceania Club Championship: 2004-2005

== Trivia ==
Jacob appeared as an Undercover Coach on Australian Disney Channel.
