= Jack Hingert =

Sri Lankan footballer (born 1990)

Personal information
- Full name: Jack David Hingert
- Date of birth: 26 September 1990 (age 36)
- Place of birth: London, England
- Height: 1.70 m (5 ft 7 in)
- Position: Right-back

Team information
- Current team: Wynnum Wolves

Youth career
- Sutton United
- 2002–2005: Crystal Palace
- 2005–2006: Knox City

Senior career*
Years	Team	Apps	(Gls)
2007–2008	Knox City	51	(4)
2008–2009	Peterborough United	0	(0)
2009	Dandenong Thunder	15	(0)
2009–2011	North Queensland Fury	27	(0)
2011	Dandenong Thunder	7	(1)
2011–2025	Brisbane Roar	268	(4)
2025–	Wynnum Wolves	0	(0)

International career^{‡}
2024–	Sri Lanka	7	(1)
- * Club domestic league appearances and goals as of 02 May 2025 ‡ National team caps and goals as of 20 March 2025

Jack David Hingert (born 26 September 1990) is a professional footballer who plays as a right-back for NPL Queensland club Wynnum Wolves. Born in England, he represents the Sri Lanka national team.

== Early life ==
Hingert was born in London, England, to a father of Sri Lankan descent and attended Smitham Primary School and Woodcote High School in Coulsdon, London. He moved to Australia as a teenager, settling in Melbourne, Victoria and attended Wesley College in Glen Waverley and Lyndale secondary college in Dandenong, Melbourne.

== Club career ==
Hingert's football career began during his time living in England from the age of 14. He spent four years strengthening his skills at the Crystal Palace youth academy before his first stint with Peterborough United in 2008–09.

Hingert moved to Australia with his family at the age of 14 and spent his youth career in Melbourne. In 2009, Hingert played for the Dandenong Thunder in the Victorian Premier League.

In 2009, Hingert moved to Queensland to play in the A-League for the North Queensland Fury making 11 appearances with the team before unfortunate circumstances saw the Club close down in 2011.

In 2011, Hingert moved back to Melbourne to play for the Dandenong Thunder in the Victorian Premier League during the A-League off-season.

In July 2011, Hingert signed a two-year contract with Brisbane Roar. Hingert has played for the Brisbane Roar for the past seven years and established himself as an integral part of the team and Brisbane Roar community. Over the past seven years, Hingert has made over 150 appearances, including winning two A-League Championships with the team in the 2011–12 and 2013–14 seasons.

Brisbane Roar announced Jack Hingert's departure on June 24, 2025.

== International career ==
In October 2022, Hingert was called up to the training camp of the Sri Lanka national team. In February 2024, he was again called up to play in the FIFA Series in March 2024.

Hingert made his debut in Sri Lanka's opening game of the tournament, a 0–0 draw with Papua New Guinea.

Hingert scored his first international goal on 16 November 2024 against Yemen at the Al Khor Stadium.

== Personal life ==
In 2016, Hingert became an ambassador for the RSPCA Queensland, having actively fostered dogs in the charity's care for several years.

== Career statistics ==
=== Club ===
As of 26 June 2025

Appearances and goals by club, season and competition
Club	Season	League			Australia Cup		ACL		Total	
Club	Season	Division	Apps	Goals	Apps	Goals	Apps	Goals	Apps	Goals
Knox City	2007	Victorian State League Division 2	22	2	—		—		22	2
Knox City	2008	Victorian State League Division 2	21	4	—		—		21	4
Knox City	Club total		43	6	0	0	0	0	43	6
Dandenong Thunder	2009	Victorian Premier League	17	0	—		—		17	0
North Queensland	2009–10	A-League	7	0	—		—		7	0
North Queensland	2010–11	A-League	20	0	—		—		20	0
North Queensland	Total		27	0	0	0	0	0	27	0
Dandenong Thunder	2011	Victorian Premier League	7	1	—		—		7	1
Brisbane Roar	2011–12	A-League	11	0	—		1	0	12	0
Brisbane Roar	2012–13	A-League	21	0	—		1	0	22	0
Brisbane Roar	2013–14	A-League	20	0	—		—		20	0
Brisbane Roar	2014–15	A-League	8	1	1	0	6	0	15	1
Brisbane Roar	2015–16	A-League	28	0	1	0	—		29	0
Brisbane Roar	2016–17	A-League	25	0	1	0	6	0	32	0
Brisbane Roar	2017–18	A-League	27	1	1	0	1	0	29	1
Brisbane Roar	2018–19	A-League	16	0	1	0	—		17	0
Brisbane Roar	2019–20	A-League	18	0	0	0	—		18	0
Brisbane Roar	2020–21	A-League	17	1	—		—		17	1
Brisbane Roar	2021–22	A-League	22	0	3	0	—		25	0
Brisbane Roar	2022–23	A-League	22	0	3	0	—		25	0
Brisbane Roar	2023–24	A-League	22	1	5	0	—		27	1
Brisbane Roar	2024–25	A-League	20	0	2	0	—		22	0
Brisbane Roar	Total		276	4	18	0	15	0	309	4
Wynnum Wolves	2025	National Premier Leagues Queensland	0	0	—		—		0	0
Career total			370	11	18	0	15	0	403	11

=== International ===
As of 16 September 2024

Appearances and goals by national team and year
National team	Year	Apps	Goals
Sri Lanka	2024	6	1
Sri Lanka	2025	1	0
Total		7	1

Scores and results list Sri Lanka's goal tally first, score column indicates score after each Hingert goal.

List of international goals scored by Jack Hingert
No.	Date	Venue	Opponent	Score	Result	Competition
1	16 November 2024	Al-Khor SC Stadium, Doha, Qatar	Yemen	1–0	1–0	Friendly

== Honours ==
Brisbane Roar

- A-League Championship: 2011–12, 2013–14
