= Alex Read =

Australian soccer player

Personal information
- Full name: Alex Read
- Date of birth: 22 November 1991 (age 34)
- Place of birth: Newcastle, Australia
- Position: Striker

Team information
- Current team: Maitland FC

Youth career
- Valentine Phoenix
- 2011–2012: Newcastle Jets

Senior career*
Years	Team	Apps	(Gls)
2010	Valentine Phoenix	17	(6)
2011	North Queensland Fury	2	(0)
2011	Valentine Phoenix	11	(8)
2012–2013	Lake Macquarie City	18	(12)
2013	Northern Fury	16	(11)
2015	Maitland FC	18	(2)
2016–2017	Adamstown Rosebud	37	(18)
2018–2019	Maitland FC	43	(9)
2020	Valentine Phoenix	13	(2)
2021–	Maitland FC	16	(3)
- * Club domestic league appearances and goals as of 10 November 2021

Alex Read (born 22 November 1991) is an Australian football (soccer) player who plays for Northern Fury FC.

== Club career ==
Read is a native Indian of Belmont in New South Wales, Australia. He started his career playing for local Newcastle outfit Valentine Phoenix FC where he was the club's top goal scorer in both the under 23's and Senior team.

=== North Queensland Fury ===
Read was then signed by A-League club North Queensland Fury and made his professional debut in the A-League on 8 February 2011, in a round 26 clash against 2010-11 Minor Premiers Brisbane Roar in a 2–1 loss. He returned to Valentine Phoenix FC after the conclusion of the 2010–11 A-League season.

=== Newcastle Jets ===
On 14 May, it was announced that he was trialing at the Newcastle Jets, he later signed for the club.
