= Lorenzo Sipi =

Australian soccer player

Personal information
- Full name: Lorenzo Alexa Sipi
- Date of birth: 13 May 1991 (age 35)
- Place of birth: Townsville, Queensland, Australia
- Position: Defender

Youth career
- Townsville Rebels
- 2008–2009: NQ Razorbacks

Senior career*
Years	Team	Apps	(Gls)
2009–2010	NQ Razorbacks		
2010–2011	North Queensland Fury	5	(0)
2011	NQ Razorbacks		
2012	Brisbane Strikers		
2013	Rebels FC	15	(2)
2014	NQ Razorbacks		
2015	Rebels FC	10	(0)
2016	Innisfail United	13	(3)
2017	Far North Queensland	17	(0)
- * Club domestic league appearances and goals as of 29 February 2017

Lorenzo Sipi (born 13 May 1991) is an Australian footballer.

== Career ==
Born in Townsville, Queensland, on 4 November 2010 it was announced he had signed a contract with A-League club North Queensland Fury Sipi made his debut for the Fury in round 13 against Melbourne Heart.

== Rugby career ==
He also spent two years (2007 and 2008) playing rugby league for Tully Tigers.

== Personal life ==
Sipi is of Torres Strait Island descent.
