= Eugene Sseppuya =

Ugandan footballer (born 1983)

Personal information
- Full name: Andrew Eugene Sseppuya
- Date of birth: 1 April 1983 (age 43)
- Place of birth: Kampala, Uganda
- Height: 1.85 m (6 ft 1 in)
- Position: Striker

Youth career
- 1990–1998: SC Villa

College career
Years	Team	Apps	(Gls)
2001–2004	Alabama A&M Bulldogs		

Senior career*
Years	Team	Apps	(Gls)
1998–2001	SC Villa		
2005	Colorado Rapids	1	(0)
2005	Virginia Beach Mariners	8	(2)
2007	Banants	0	(0)
2008	Vojvodina	14	(2)
2009	Čukarički	18	(9)
2009	Mladi Radnik	6	(0)
2010	Sūduva	3	(0)
2010	North Queensland Fury	13	(1)
2011	Petrolul Ploiești	3	(0)
2011–2012	Borac Čačak	14	(0)
2012	Jedinstvo Bijelo Polje	11	(3)
2013	Istiklol Dushanbe	4	(3)
2016	Jedinstvo Bijelo Polje	0	(0)

International career^{‡}
2000	Uganda B	1	(0)
2007–2010	Uganda	7	(2)
- * Club domestic league appearances and goals as of 11 May 2019 ‡ National team caps and goals as of 1 October 2012

Andrew Eugene Sseppuya (born 1 April 1983) is a Ugandan former professional footballer who played as a striker. Sseppuya is a former international for the Uganda national team.

== Club career ==
Sseppuya played college soccer at Alabama A&M from 2001 to 2004, during which time he played in 59 games, scoring 41 goals and 19 assists, leading the team in scoring from 2001 to 2003. An injury that kept him out for much of the 2004 season prevented him from repeating the feat a fourth season, but despite playing only four games all season, Sepuya was selected 31st in the 2005 MLS Supplemental Draft. He played one game for the Colorado Rapids, before getting his release in June.

Sseppuya has completed a transfer to Armenian soccer team FC Banants for an undisclosed fee. After few league rounds of 2007 season, he was released without making any league appearances. Then he joined Serbian team FK Vojvodina. During winter 2008–09 transfer window, he joined FK Čukarički. In late April 2009, he was statistically the most productive scorer in Serbian Superliga 2008–09 season, having played one match for Vojvodina and 11 for Čukarički while scoring seven goals, all of which translates to a rate of one goal for every 114 minutes on the pitch.

=== Mladi Radnik ===
In October 2009, he signed a one-year contract for FK Mladi Radnik.

=== Sūduva ===
On 16 March 2010, Sseppuya signed a contract with Lithuanian club FK Sūduva.

=== North Queensland Fury ===
On 1 August 2010, Sseppuya signed a contract with A-League side North Queensland Fury making him the club's 20th player to sign for the upcoming season. Sseppuya scored his first goal for the Fury in their round 3, 2–2 draw with Melbourne Victory. He was released from the Fury after the club folded.

=== Petrolul Ploiești ===
At the end of March 2011, he signed a contract with the Romanian Liga II club Petrolul Ploiești. He was released from the club in the summer, after the club gained promotion into Liga I.

=== Borac Čačak ===
In early September 2011 he moved back to Serbia and signed a 2-year contract with FK Borac Čačak. He will be available for the club in the round 5 of the 2011–12 Serbian SuperLiga. In July 2012, after the relegation of Borac from the SuperLiga, Sseppuya was in trial with Boyacá Chico, although finally he was signed by FK Jedinstvo Bijelo Polje in the Montenegrin First League.

=== Istiklol ===
Sseppuya scored 3 goals in 4 appearances for FC Istiklol before being released by the club in January 2014.
