= Brad McDonald =

Papua New Guinean footballer (born 1990)

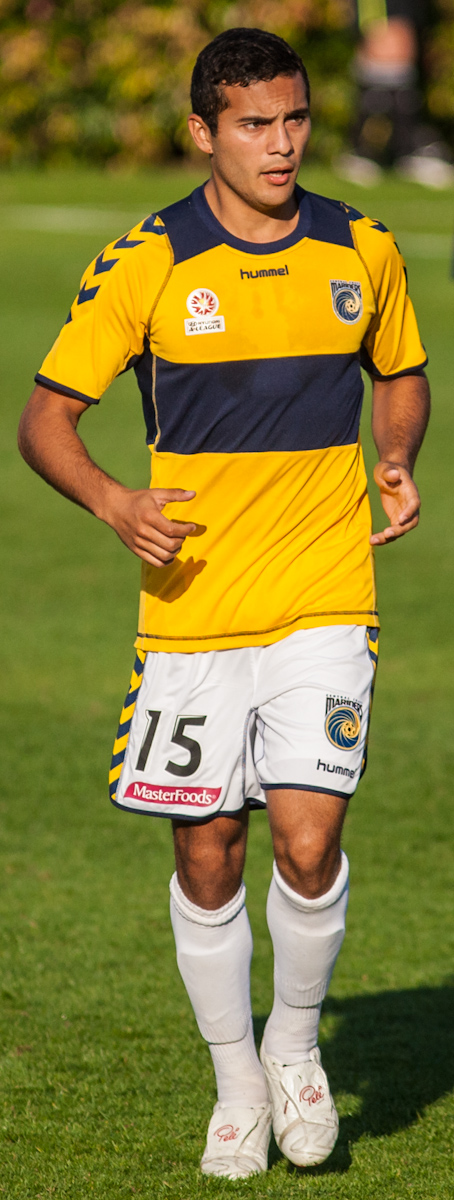
- McDonald playing for Central Coast Mariners in 2012

Personal information
- Full name: Bradley James McDonald
- Date of birth: 17 February 1990 (age 36)
- Place of birth: Mount Hagen, Papua New Guinea
- Height: 1.71 m (5 ft 7 1/2 in)
- Position: Midfielder

Youth career
- 2007–2008: Brisbane City
- 2008–2009: Brisbane Roar

Senior career*
Years	Team	Apps	(Gls)
2010	Brisbane Strikers	20	(0)
2010–2011	North Queensland Fury	25	(0)
2011	Brisbane Strikers	6	(1)
2011–2013	Central Coast Mariners	1	(0)
2013	CCM Academy	10	(2)
2014	APIA Leichhardt	20	(4)
2015	Manly United	22	(1)
2016–2017	Central Coast Mariners	8	(0)
2017–2018	Davao Aguilas	47	(3)
2019–2020	Manly United	21	(0)
2021	Central Coast United	1	(0)
Total		181	(11)

International career
2014	Papua New Guinea	1	(0)
- * Club domestic league appearances and goals

Bradley James McDonald (born 17 February 1990) is a Papua New Guinean former international footballer who played as a defensive midfielder.

Born in Mount Hagen, McDonald played youth football in Australia after moving there at a young age. He played for a number of Australian clubs at senior level, including in the A-League for North Queensland Fury and Central Coast Mariners.

== Career ==
After moving to Australia at the age of 5, McDonald began his career with the Brisbane Roar in their youth system before heading to the Brisbane Strikers in the QSL competition.

On 12 August 2010, McDonald was signed by the North Queensland Fury. McDonald made his debut for the club against Adelaide United coming off the bench, before eventually becoming a regular starter.

On 15 April 2011, he signed for A-League outfit Central Coast Mariners. He made only one first team league appearance for the side, starting in a 2–1 win over Melbourne Heart on 30 March 2013. He also appeared in one AFC Champions League match, coming on as a late substitute in a loss to Guizhou Renhe in April 2013.

In January 2016, McDonald returned to the Mariners, having spent three seasons playing in the National Premier Leagues. He was released by the club one year later.

== International ==
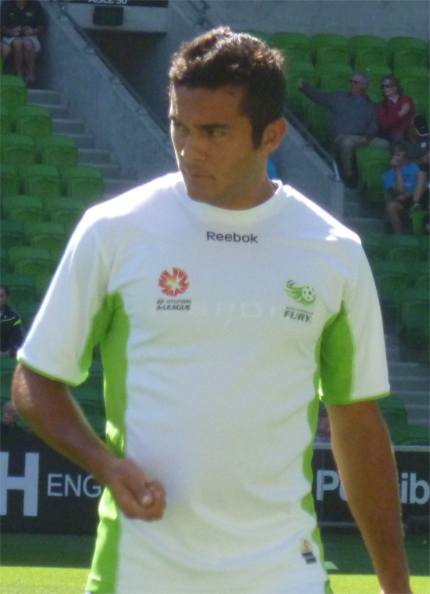
McDonald in 2010

McDonald was called up by Aurelio Vidmar for an Australia U-23 training camp in October 2011. At the time, he stated that he was still potentially interested in playing for Papua New Guinea as an alternative to Australia.

In September 2014, McDonald made his debut for Papua New Guinea, coming on as a substitute and setting up a goal in a 2–1 loss to Singapore. In January 2016, he stated his commitment to representing Papua New Guinea and that he was in the process of obtaining citizenship which is necessary to appear in competitive matches for the country. He hoped to have the paperwork completed in time to compete in the 2016 OFC Nations Cup. However, he was not part of the final roster for the tournament.

== Honours ==
=== Club ===
Central Coast Mariners:

- A-League Premiership: 2011–2012
- A-League Championship: 2012–2013
