= Sebastian Usai =

Australian soccer player

Personal information
- Full name: Sebastian Anthony Usai
- Date of birth: 28 February 1990 (age 36)
- Place of birth: Brisbane, Australia
- Height: 1.90 m (6 ft 3 in)
- Position: Goalkeeper

Team information
- Current team: Canberra Olympic FC
- Number: 1

Youth career
- 2005–2007: Brisbane City FC

Senior career*
Years	Team	Apps	(Gls)
2010	Brisbane Strikers	12	(0)
2010–2011	North Queensland Fury	4	(0)
2011–2013	Blackburn Rovers	0	(0)
2013–2014	AFC United	16	(0)
2014	Cowdenbeath	5	(0)
2015	Southport	0	(0)
2016	Brisbane Strikers	22	(0)
2016–2020	Friska Viljor	87	(0)
2020	CD Robres	2	(0)
2020	Logan Lightning	4	(0)
2022–	Canberra Olympic	63	(0)
- * Club domestic league appearances and goals as of 14 November 2024

Sebastian Anthony Pryde Usai (born 28 February 1990) is an Australian footballer who currently play as a goalkeeper for CD Robres in Spain.

== Career ==
=== North Queensland Fury ===
Usai joined up with the North Queensland A-League outfit during the 2010-11 season as an injury replacement player. He made his professional debut in the Hyundai A-League on 8 January 2011, in a round 22 clash against Newcastle Jets in a 3–1 loss. After the Fury folded at the end of the season Usai headed to England in search of trials.

=== Blackburn Rovers ===
In August, just before Usai was going to return home, he was contacted by Gary Bowyer and after impressing in a trial he signed a deal to the end of the season with an option for a second year.

On 13 May 2012, Usai sat on the bench during Rovers 2–1 defeat by Chelsea in their final match of the 2011–12 Premier League season. His call up to the first team was due to both Paul Robinson and Mark Bunn being injured. He left the club on 8 August 2013 after mutually agreeing termination of his contract.

=== Cowdenbeath ===
On 31 January 2014, Usai moved from AFC United to Cowdenbeath. On 25 May 2014, he was released by the club.

=== Brisbane Strikers ===
On 1 January 2016 Usai returned to the Brisbane Strikers for his second stint at the club. Usai won goalkeeper of the year in his first season back in the NPL QLD and promptly indicated his intention was to return to Europe.

=== Friska Viljor FC ===
On 1 January 2017 Usai returned to Europe signing with Friska Viljor FC. In October 2019, Usai was nominated for Sweden Division 2 Goalkeeper of the year.

=== CD Robres ===
On 3 February 2020 Spanish club CD Robres announced via Twitter it had signed Usai. He returned home to Queensland during the global COVID-19 pandemic and signed for Football Queensland Premier League side Logan Lightning on 1 August 2020.
