= Dyron Daal =

Dutch-Curaçaoan footballer (born 1983)

Personal information
- Full name: Dyron Rudolph Daal
- Date of birth: 11 October 1983 (age 43)
- Place of birth: Amsterdam, Netherlands
- Height: 1.93 m (6 ft 4 in)
- Position: Striker

Youth career
- Ajax
- FC Utrecht
- AFC

Senior career*
Years	Team	Apps	(Gls)
2004	Stormvogels Telstar	0	(0)
2005–2006	Omniworld	28	(8)
2006–2007	Aberdeen	7	(2)
2007	→ Dundee (loan)	7	(5)
2007–2008	St Johnstone	8	(0)
2008	Fuenlabrada	12	(1)
2008–2009	Ross County	28	(3)
2009–2011	North Queensland Fury	38	(7)
2011–2012	South China	3	(1)
2012	Kienlongbank Kiên Giang	13	(3)
2013–2016	Beerschot Wilrijk	67	(40)
2016–2017	RWDM	25	(18)
2017–2018	Duffel	24	(8)
2018–2019	Lyra-Lierse	15	(4)

International career^{‡}
2002–2008	Netherlands Antilles	7	(0)
2011–2022	Curaçao	6	(0)
- * Club domestic league appearances and goals as of 21:46, 19 May 2019 (UTC) ‡ National team caps and goals as of 00:00, 23 April 2025 (UTC)

Dyron Rudolph Daal (born 11 October 1983) is a retired footballer who played as a striker. Born in the Netherlands, he represented Curaçao internationally.

== Club career ==
Born in Amsterdam, Netherlands, Daal is a product of the Ajax youth system and he had a spell with Dutch amateur club FC Omniworld, before joining Aberdeen in August 2006. He was signed on an amateur contract, due to red tape governing the transfer of amateur players in the Netherlands. Daal joined Dundee on loan until the end of the 2006–07 season to cover for Dee's player Derek Lyle, who was injured.

Soon after this loan spell expired, he was told that he had no future at the club by Jimmy Calderwood and he left in the summer of 2007 and moved to St Johnstone. On 30 January 2008, Daal was released by St Johnstone due to a replacement of their manager. He signed for Spanish club CF Fuenlabrada but left at the end of the 2008 season to move back to Scotland, signing for newly promoted Scottish First Division side Ross County.

=== North Queensland Fury ===
In August 2009, Daal made the long trip to Australia and was signed by new A-League club North Queensland Fury to a short-term injury cover deal, backed by the recommendation of North Queensland assistant coach Stewart Petrie who spent time with Daal at Ross County. Daal's visa was rushed through in time for him to take the field in Round 1 for North Queensland's inaugural A-League match against Sydney FC.

Daal started alongside captain Robbie Fowler before being substituted in the 54th minute of the match which North Queensland lost 3–2. Appearances for the Townsville-based outfit in his initial stages with the club were mostly made from the bench, with his first goal for North Queensland against Adelaide United on 28 August 2009 with a cool finish. Daal became embroiled in controversy when he conceded a last minute penalty kick, having been adjudged to have handled the ball in the Adelaide penalty box. Robbie Fowler came out in support of Daal in the media shortly after the match.

Daal's short-term contract with North Queensland expired after the Round 6 victory over Sydney FC. On 16 September 2009, coach Ian Ferguson stated his wish to retain Daal's services in Townsville. Daal remained in Townsville, and despite North Queensland's 23-man playing roster already being full, Daal was signed up to his second short-term injury cover deal as a replacement for Karl Dodd.

On 24 October 2009, Daal made history by securing North Queensland's first ever home victory with a stunning left foot drive to seal a 2–1 comeback against Perth Glory. Daal's effort was awarded the Solo Goal of the Week for Round 12 of the A-League. On the back of a string of impressive performances including a brace against Newcastle Jets, and then one week later scored a stunning winner against Melbourne Victory. Daal was rewarded with a one-year full-time deal with North Queensland, which kept him at the club until the end of the 2010/11 A-League season. Due to the North Queensland Fury club folding at the end of the 2010–11 season, Daal left and signed for Hong Kong First Division League club South China.

=== Kienlongbank Kien Giang ===
In 2012, he moved to Vietnam to play for Kienlongbank Kien Giang F.C. where he scored two goals and help Kienlongbank Kien Giang F.C. avoid relegation

It was confirmed in August 2016 that Ross County manager Jim McInytre expressed his interest for Daal to rejoin the club he once played for following the departure of Brian Graham to Hibernian. Daal is back in the UK and is rumoured to be signing a 2-year deal for the Scottish Premiership outfit despite interest from highland rivals Inverness Caledonian Thistle.

=== RWDM ===
In summer 2016, Daal joined Belgian Third Amateur Division club RWDM from fellow Belgian side FCO Beerschot Wilrijk, where he scored 40 goals in 67 matches. He scored 18 in 25 in his first season at RWDM.

== International career ==
In January 2008, Daal was called up to the Netherlands Antilles squad for their World Cup qualifier with Nicaragua on 6 February 2008. He has already won two caps, against Antigua & Barbuda and Haiti in November 2002 (both matches in Haiti).
