= Jimmy Downey =

Australian footballer

Personal information
- Full name: James Downey
- Date of birth: 19 October 1987 (age 39)
- Place of birth: Gympie, Queensland, Australia
- Height: 1.77 m (5 ft 10 in)
- Positions: Right winger; right back

Youth career
- 2003–2004: QAS
- 2005–2006: AIS

Senior career*
Years	Team	Apps	(Gls)
2007–2010	Perth Glory	34	(0)
2010	North Queensland Fury	4	(0)
2010–2011	Sparta Rotterdam	2	(0)
2011	Oakleigh Cannons	10	(2)
2011–2013	Wellington Phoenix	7	(0)
2015	Ballarat Red Devils	3	(0)

International career
2006	Australia U-20	13	(1)
- * Club domestic league appearances and goals

James Downey (born 19 October 1987) is an Australian footballer who last played for Ballarat Red Devils in the National Premier Leagues Victoria Division 1.

== Club career ==
Downey was with the Queensland Academy of Sport between 2003 and 2004 before joining the Australian Institute of Sport in 2005. Downey holds the AIS football program beep test record (16.3).

In March 2007 Downey was signed by Perth Glory where he is contracted to the end of the 2009/2010 A-League season. On 12 January 2010, it was announced he would be joining North Queensland for the rest of the 2009–10 season in a swap for striker Daniel McBreen.

He was released, along with all other North Queensland players. He signed up for Dutch Eerste Divisie side Sparta in July 2010.

He has come back to Australia and is playing with local club the Oakleigh Cannons, in the Victorian Premier League in a bid to gain a professional contract with an A-League club. He scored his first goal for the club against St Albans Saints. He scored his second goal for the opening the scoring, against the Green Gully Cavaliers

He was signed by New Zealand A-League team Wellington Phoenix for the 2011–12 A-League season. Downey was released in June 2013. A persistent knee injury kept Downey out of professional football until January 2015 when it was announced that he had signed for Ballarat Red Devils ahead of their maiden season in National Premier Leagues Victoria 1, after training with the team for the entire 2014 NPLV season during his rehabilitation.

== International career ==
Downey has played 13 games for the Young Socceroos, scoring one goal. He has also been called up for the Australia under 17 team.

== Career statistics ==
(Correct as of 6 May 2011)

Club	Season	A-League			Finals			Asia			Total		
Club	Season	Apps	Goals	Assists	Apps	Goals	Assists	Apps	Goals	Assists	Apps	Goals	Assists
Perth Glory	2007–08	17	0	4	-	-	-	-	-	-	17	0	4
Perth Glory	2008–09	14	0	0	-	-	-	-	-	-	14	0	0
Perth Glory	2009–10	3	0	0	-	-	-	-	-	-	3	0	0
Perth Glory	Club Subotal	34	0	4	-	-	-	-	-	-	34	0	4
North Queensland Fury	2009–10	4	0	0	-	-	-	-	-	-	4	0	0
League Subtotal		38	0	4	-	-	-	-	-	-	38	0	4
Club	Season	Eerste Divisie			Dutch Cup			Europe			Total		
Sparta Rotterdam	2010–11	2	0	0	1	0	0	-	-	-	3	0	0
Club	Season	A-League			Finals			Asia			Total		
Wellington Phoenix	2011–12	5	0	0	-	-	-	-	-	-	5	0	0
Total		45	0	4	1	0	0	-	-	-	46	0	4
