= Justin Pasfield =

Australian soccer player (born 1985)

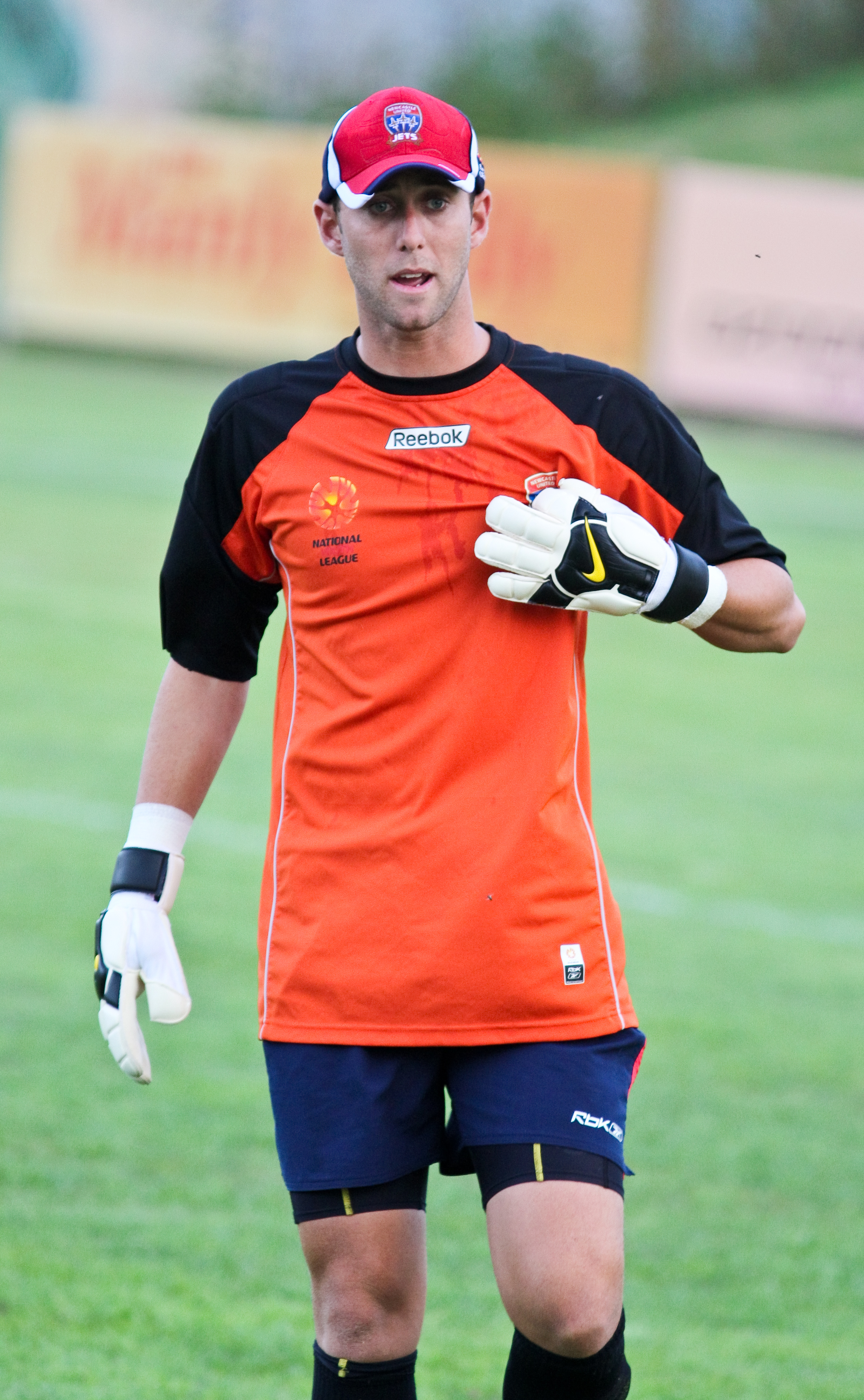
- Pasfield playing for Newcastle Jets Youth in 2009

Personal information
- Full name: Justin Thomas Pasfield
- Date of birth: 30 May 1985 (age 41)
- Place of birth: Wollongong, Australia
- Height: 1.89 m (6 ft 2 in)
- Position: Goalkeeper

Team information
- Current team: Wollongong Olympic
- Number: 1

Youth career
- Lake Heights
- Wollongong Wolves

Senior career*
Years	Team	Apps	(Gls)
2001–2003	Wollongong Wolves	1	(0)
2004–2005	Bray Wanderers	28	(0)
2005–2007	Sydney FC	0	(0)
2007	Sydney United	23	(0)
2008	Queensland Roar	0	(0)
2008–2009	Wollongong Wolves	4	(0)
2008–2009	→ Newcastle Jets (loan)	0	(0)
2009–2011	North Queensland Fury	39	(0)
2011–2014	Central Coast Mariners	14	(0)
2014	Tampines Rovers	14	(0)
2015	Sydney United	19	(0)
2016–2021	Wollongong Wolves	89	(0)
2022–	Wollongong Olympic	8	(0)

International career^{‡}
2004–2005	Australia U-20	3	(0)
2007	Australia U-23	3	(0)
- * Club domestic league appearances and goals as of 19 April 2024 ‡ National team caps and goals as of 17:30, 15 November 2010 (UTC)

Justin Pasfield (born 30 May 1985) is an Australian professional goalkeeper who plays for Wollongong Olympic.

He was part of the Joeys squad for the 2005 FIFA World Youth Championship in the Netherlands, and previously played for Bray Wanderers in the League of Ireland, Wollongong Wolves in the National Soccer League and Central Coast Mariners in the A-League.

== Club career ==
Pasfield was understudy to Clint Bolton at Sydney FC in the A-League during the 2005–06 and 2006–07 seasons, but failed to take the pitch in a competitive match. He joined NSWPL club Sydney United on loan during Sydney FC's AFC Champions League 2007 campaign, the move made permanent at the close of the group stage when he was released from the A-League side.

Seeking a return to the top flight, he recently trialled at Newcastle Jets, and was named as a backup to first choice Ante Čović for the Jets A-League Pre-season Cup games. He has been training with Queen's Park Rangers in the Championship alongside veteran Australian goalkeeper, Mark Bosnich.

On 4 December, he signed a six-week short-term deal with the Newcastle Jets, replacing the injured Ben Kennedy.

In 2009 Pasfield joined fledgling A-League club, North Queensland Fury.

Thanks to FFA dragging its feet with the decision on what amount of the club's annual losses it was willing to fund, Pasfield decided to move onto the Central Coast Mariners at the end of the 2010/11 season, bringing to an end his time at the Fury, where he became one of the crowd favourites.

== A-League career statistics ==
As of 17 February 2014

CS = Clean Sheets

Club	Season	A-League		Finals		Cup		International^{1}		Total	
Club	Season	Apps	CS	Apps	CS	Apps	CS	Apps	CS	Apps	CS
Sydney FC	2005–06	0	0	0	0	0	0	0	0	0	0
Sydney FC	2006–07	0	0	0	0	3	1	0	0	3	1
Sydney FC	Total	0	0	0	0	3	1	0	0	3	1
Queensland Roar	2008–09	0	0	0	0	0	0	-	-	0	0
Queensland Roar	Total	0	0	0	0	0	0	0	0	0	0
Newcastle Jets	2008–09	0	0	-	-	0	0	0	0	0	0
Newcastle Jets	Total	0	0	0	0	0	0	0	0	0	0
North Queensland Fury	2009–10	13	2	-	-	-	-	-	-	13	2
North Queensland Fury	2010–11	26	2	-	-	-	-	-	-	26	2
North Queensland Fury	Total	39	4	0	0	-	-	0	0	39	4
Central Coast Mariners	2011–12	6	1	0	0	-	-	0	0	6	1
Central Coast Mariners	2012–13	4	2	0	0	-	-	0	0	4	2
Central Coast Mariners	2013–14	4	1	-	-	-	-	0	0	4	1
Central Coast Mariners	Total	14	4	0	0	-	-	0	0	14	4
A-League total		53	8	0	0	3	1	0	0	56	9

^{1} – Includes FIFA Club World Cup statistics; AFC Champions League statistics are included in season commencing during group stages (i.e. ACL 2013 and A-League season 2012–13 etc.)

== Honours ==
With Sydney FC:

- A-League Championship: 2005–2006
- Oceania Club Championship: 2004–2005

With Central Coast Mariners:

- A-League Premiership: 2011–2012
- A-League Championship: 2012–2013

With Sydney United:

- Waratah Cup: 2015

With Wollongong Wolves:

- National Premier Leagues NSW Premiership: 2019
