= Simon Storey =

Australian soccer player

Personal information
- Full name: Simon Storey
- Date of birth: 5 June 1982 (age 44)
- Place of birth: Melbourne, Australia
- Height: 1.80 m (5 ft 11 in)
- Positions: Right back; left back

Youth career
- Dingley City
- Doveton
- Hampton Park United
- Bulleen
- 1997–2000: VIS

Senior career*
Years	Team	Apps	(Gls)
1999	Springvale City	29	(2)
2000–2003	Green Gully	62	(3)
2003–2004	South Melbourne	19	(0)
2005	Altona Magic	1	(0)
2005–2007	Melbourne Victory	32	(0)
2007–2009	Partick Thistle	83	(1)
2009–2010	Airdrie United	39	(0)
2010–2011	North Queensland Fury	25	(1)
2011	Green Gully Cavaliers	5	(1)
2011	Mohun Bagan	15	(2)
2014–2015	Dandenong City	11	(3)
2021–	Langwarrin SC	21	(1)
- * Club domestic league appearances and goals as of 25 November 2022

Simon Storey (born 5 June 1982) is an Australian footballer.

== Club career ==
Storey began his senior career at Springvale City in State League 1 for one season at the age of 16 whilst on scholarship with the Victorian Institute of Sport for 3 years.

His 3-year stint at Green Gully in the Victorian Premier League as a left wing back, where, in his final year was awarded the Victorian Premier League Under 21 Player of the Year, and was also awarded the Jimmy Rooney medal (for best on ground) in a victorious Green Gully side in the grand final. Storey then went on to play for South Melbourne in the National Soccer League as a left full back under Stuart Munro. Storey was signed to be a part of the inaugural Melbourne Victory FC squad for Hyundai A-League season 2005/06. In season 2006/07 Storey was an integral part at right full back in the Melbourne side that would become the first team to complete the A-League double in the history of the competition; clinching the premiership against the New Zealand Knights 4–0 at Olympic Park with 4 rounds of competition remaining, then beating Adelaide United 6–0 in the grand final at a 56,000 sold out Telstra Dome to take the championship.

He joined Scottish club Partick Thistle in August 2007 on a short-term contract. This was extended to the end of the 2008–09 season as he proved a very competent performer. Storey predominantly played as a right full back, his versatility at Thistle saw Ian McCall play him numerous games as sweeper, centre midfielder and also left back. Storey was also the November pin up for the 2008 Clyde 1 Cash for Kids Charity Calendar which raises funds to support the most vulnerable children in Scottish communities. On 5 August 2008 against Forfar Athletic in the League Cup Storey became the first player to captain a Scottish League Team to wear a pink strip as Partick unveiled their new pink and grey away strip. Fans at Firhill as well as the management appreciated his high-work rate and intelligence on the field.

After Partick Thistle narrowly missed promotion to the Scottish Premier League in the 2008–09 season, Storey decided to leave the club, leading to speculation he'd return to Australia. But in an interview with FourFourTwo journalist Ben Somerford, Storey revealed he was hoping to stay in Europe. After a successful trial at Hungarian club Vasas SC Storey looked set to move to Budapest however the deal fell through late after Vasas' financial problems prevented them signing the Australian. Storey returned to Scotland where he signed for Airdrie United in September 2009 playing predominantly as a central defender and full back.

In June 2010 Storey returned to Australia and the Hyundai A-League to play for North Queensland Fury FC in the 2010/2011 season. Unfortunately the club was to be closed by Football Federation Australia due to financial instability.

In July 2011 Storey signed for I-League club Mohun Bagan A.C. on a one-year contract.

== Honours ==
With Melbourne Victory:

- (Australia) A-League Championship: 2006–2007
- (Australia) A-League Premiership: 2006–2007

== Physiotherapy ==
Storey qualified as a physiotherapist from La Trobe University in Melbourne Australia in 2004 and worked at numerous private musculosketal/sports practices whilst playing football professionally. Whilst in Scotland he ran his own physiotherapy practice called Simon Storey Physiotherapy in Virgin Active Glasgow

Storey was the Head Physiotherapist and Head of Medical Services Manager at Melbourne Heart (now City) FC during the 2013-2014 A-League season.

He then had a role working closely with Orthopaedic surgeons in trying to achieve optimal care for surgical patients.

In 2018 Storey co-founded CEED Injury Rehab, leaving in 2021.
