= North Queensland Razorbacks FC =

- Full name: North Queensland Razorbacks Football Club
- Nickname: Razorbacks
- Founded: Unknown
- Ground: Townsville Sports Reserve, Townsville
- Capacity: Unknown
- Owner: Unknown
- Senior Mens Manager: Ken Mitchell
- League: Queensland State League
- 2010: TBA

The North Queensland Razorbacks FC was an Australian football (soccer) club which plays out of Townsville in North Queensland. They played in the Queensland State League. They were considered to be one of two feeder clubs for A-League team North Queensland Fury before its demise in 2011.

== History ==
The club has had reasonable success in the last few years. Before the North Queensland Fury were inducted into the A-League in 2009 the Razorbacks were the sole football team in Townsville and therefore got reasonable crowds in for their home games. However they have become the main feeder club for the Fury. They play their home games at the Murray Sports Reserve and normally play their games on Field 1. In turn the Fury have loaned out several players, including Jacob Timpano to the Razorbacks to gain gametime during the A-League offseason.

In 2010, the NQ Razorbacks played two warm up games against the preseason North Queensland Fury Squad, drawing 0–0 in the first match and then going down 7–2 after being 1–0 up for part of the first half.

== Current squad ==
2012 Queensland State League Squad.

Note: Flags indicate national team as defined under FIFA eligibility rules; some limited exceptions apply. Players may hold more than one non-FIFA nationality.

No.	Pos.	Nation	Player
1	GK	PER	Keiran Gonzales (Captain)
2	DF	AUS	Caleb Hobson
3	DF	AUS	James Gough
4	DF	NZL	Benjamin Richardson
5	DF	AUS	Angus Campbell
6	MF	AUS	Anthony Galliozzi
7	MF	AUS	Jae Eurell
8	MF	AUS	Gareth Edds
9	FW	AUS	Robin Edwards (Vice-Captain)
10	FW	AUS	Reece Edmonds

No.	Pos.	Nation	Player
11	FW	AUS	Alex King
12	MF	AUS	Sam Herlihy
14	MF	AUS	Kyle Whebell
15	MF	ENG	William French
16	DF	AUS	Thomas Orr
17	FW	AUS	Jacob Crowley
19	FW	AUS	Jessi Consalvo
20	GK	AUS	Ben Canty
22	GK	AUS	Ryan Chellingworth

== Staff ==
- Senior Mens Coach: Ken Mitchell
- Senior Mens Assistant Coach: Troy Perry & Anthony Galliozi
- Senior Men's Team Manager: David Chellingworth
- Senior Mens Goalkeeping Coach: David Chellingworth
- Physiotherapist: Luis Resa
- Sports Trainer: Azra Rantucci
- Operations Manager: Ric Floyd

== See also ==
- Queensland State League
