= Brett Studman =

Australian soccer player

Personal information
- Full name: Brett Studman
- Date of birth: 19 April 1985 (age 41)
- Place of birth: Kempsey, Australia
- Height: 1.86 m (6 ft 1 in)
- Position: Centre back

Team information
- Current team: Marconi Stallions

Youth career
- 2002: AIS

Senior career*
Years	Team	Apps	(Gls)
2003–2005	Sydney Olympic	0	(0)
2005–2006	Newcastle Jets	1	(0)
2007–2010	Bankstown City	68	(1)
2010–2011	North Queensland Fury	9	(1)
2011–2013	Sydney Olympic	48	(2)
2014	Blacktown Spartans	8	(0)
2015	APIA Leichhardt Tigers	18	(2)
2016	Penang FA	0	(0)
2016	APIA Leichhardt Tigers	1	(0)
2017–	Marconi Stallions	3	(0)

International career^{‡}
2001	Australia U-17	1	(0)
- * Club domestic league appearances and goals as of 21 August 2018 ‡ National team caps and goals as of 17:30, 16 November 2010 (UTC)

Brett Studman (born 19 April 1985 in Kempsey, New South Wales, Australia) is an Australian footballer who plays for APIA Leichhardt Tigers FC.

== Club career ==
Studman was a part of the AIS before signing for Sydney Olympic. He was signed by A-League club Newcastle United Jets for the first season of the competition but was released in 2006 before he moved to NSW state league club Bankstown City Lions. In 2010, he signed a contract with North Queensland Fury. He scored his only goal for North Queensland in their 3–1 away loss in the last round of the 2010–11 A-League to Wellington Phoenix in Wellington, New Zealand.

Following the demise of the Fury, Studman returned to Sydney Olympic.

In 2015, he signed for National Premier Leagues NSW club APIA Leichhardt Tigers. .

== International career ==
He represented Australia at the 2001 FIFA U-17 World Championship in Trinidad and Tobago.
