= Chris Grossman =

Australian soccer player

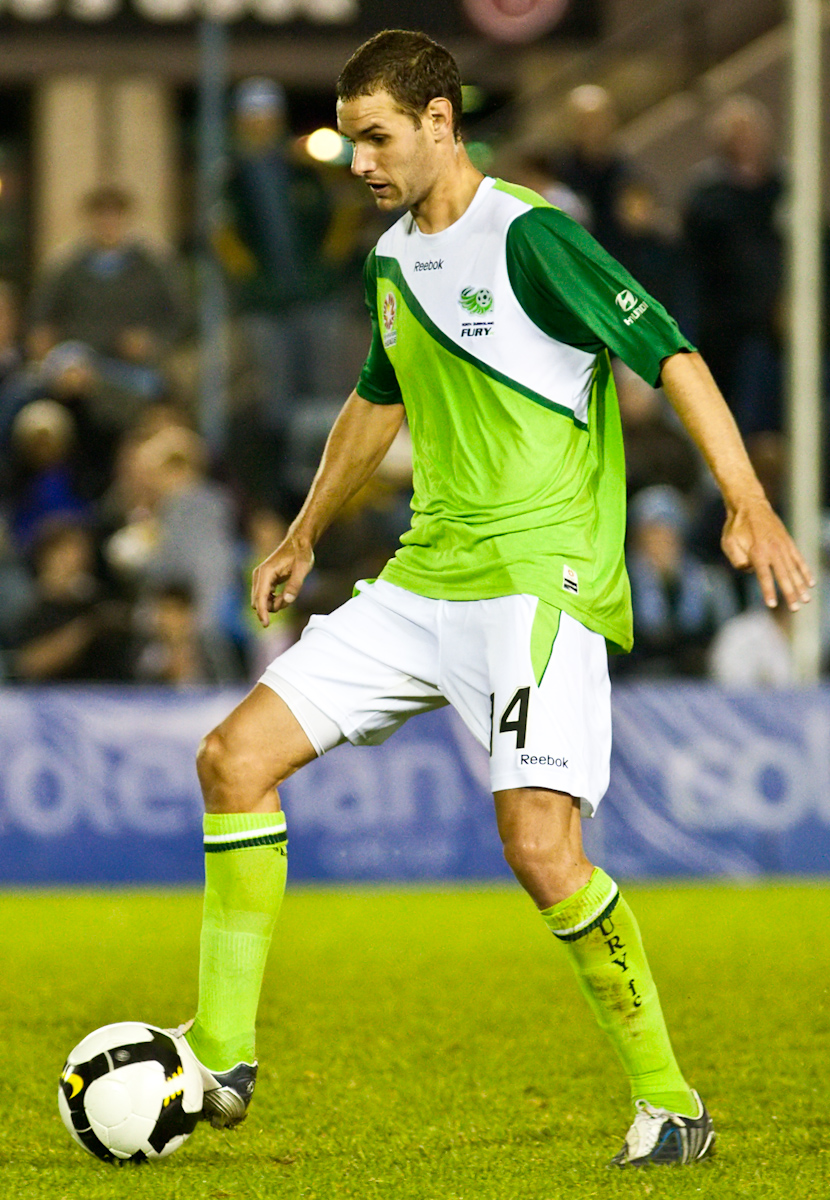
- Grossman playing for North Queensland Fury in 2009

Personal information
- Full name: Christopher Grossman
- Date of birth: 6 March 1987 (age 39)
- Place of birth: Brisbane, Australia
- Height: 1.81 m (5 ft 11 1/2 in)
- Positions: Central midfielder; central defender

Youth career
- St Bernadines
- 2004: QAS
- 2005: AIS

Senior career*
Years	Team	Apps	(Gls)
2006	Queensland Lions	6	(0)
2006–2009	Brisbane Roar	7	(0)
2007	→ Rochedale Rovers (loan)	25	(7)
2009–2011	North Queensland Fury	44	(5)
2011	North Queensland Razorbacks		
2012–2013	Moreland Zebras	19	(0)
2012	→ Newcastle Jets (loan)	0	(0)
2013–2015	Port Melbourne Sharks	59	(2)
2016	Sunshine George Cross	24	(3)

International career^{‡}
2006	Australia U-20	13	(3)

Managerial career
- 2018–2021: Brisbane Roar Youth (assistant)
- 2021–2023: Brisbane Roar Youth
- * Club domestic league appearances and goals as of 23 September 2015 ‡ National team caps and goals as of 17:30, 16 November 2010 (UTC)

Christopher Grossman (born 6 March 1987) is a retired Australian football (soccer) player who was Head Coach of the Brisbane Roar FC Youth between 2021-2023.

== Club career ==
He was signed from the Queensland Academy of Sport. The Roar allowed him to play for then current Brisbane Premier League champions, Rochedale Rovers Football Club, prior to the commencement of the A-League's third season to maintain match sharpness.

On 24 December 2008, Grossman announced that he had signed with A-League expansion team North Queensland Fury for the 2009–10 season. During the season, he has found himself the unfamiliar role of right back, to which he has excelled in and revelled at the chance of first team starting football. Coach Ian Ferguson elected to play him there largely due to the extensive injury list at North Queensland Fury.

On 21 November 2012 Grossman joined the Newcastle Jets as a short-term injury replacement for Ben Kantarovski.

Grossman signed with Port Melbourne SC ahead of the 2013 season and spent the next 3 seasons at the club, serving as captain and vice-captain during this period. He left the club following the 2015 season.

== A-League statistics ==
Club	Season	League^{1}		Cup		International^{2}		Total	
Club	Season	Apps	Goals	Apps	Goals	Apps	Goals	Apps	Goals
Queensland Roar	2006–07	2	0	0	0	0	0	2	0
Queensland Roar	2007–08	4	0	0	0	0	0	4	0
Queensland Roar	2008–09	1	0	0	0	0	0	1	0
North Queensland Fury	2009–10	22	2	0	0	0	0	22	2
North Queensland Fury	2010–11	22	3	0	0	0	0	22	3
Newcastle Jets	2012–13	0	0	0	0	0	0	0	0
Total		51	5					51	5

^{1}- includes A-League final series statistics
^{2}- includes FIFA Club World Cup statistics; AFC Champions League statistics are included in season commencing after group stages (i.e. ACL in A-League seasons etc.)
