= André Kilian =

German footballer

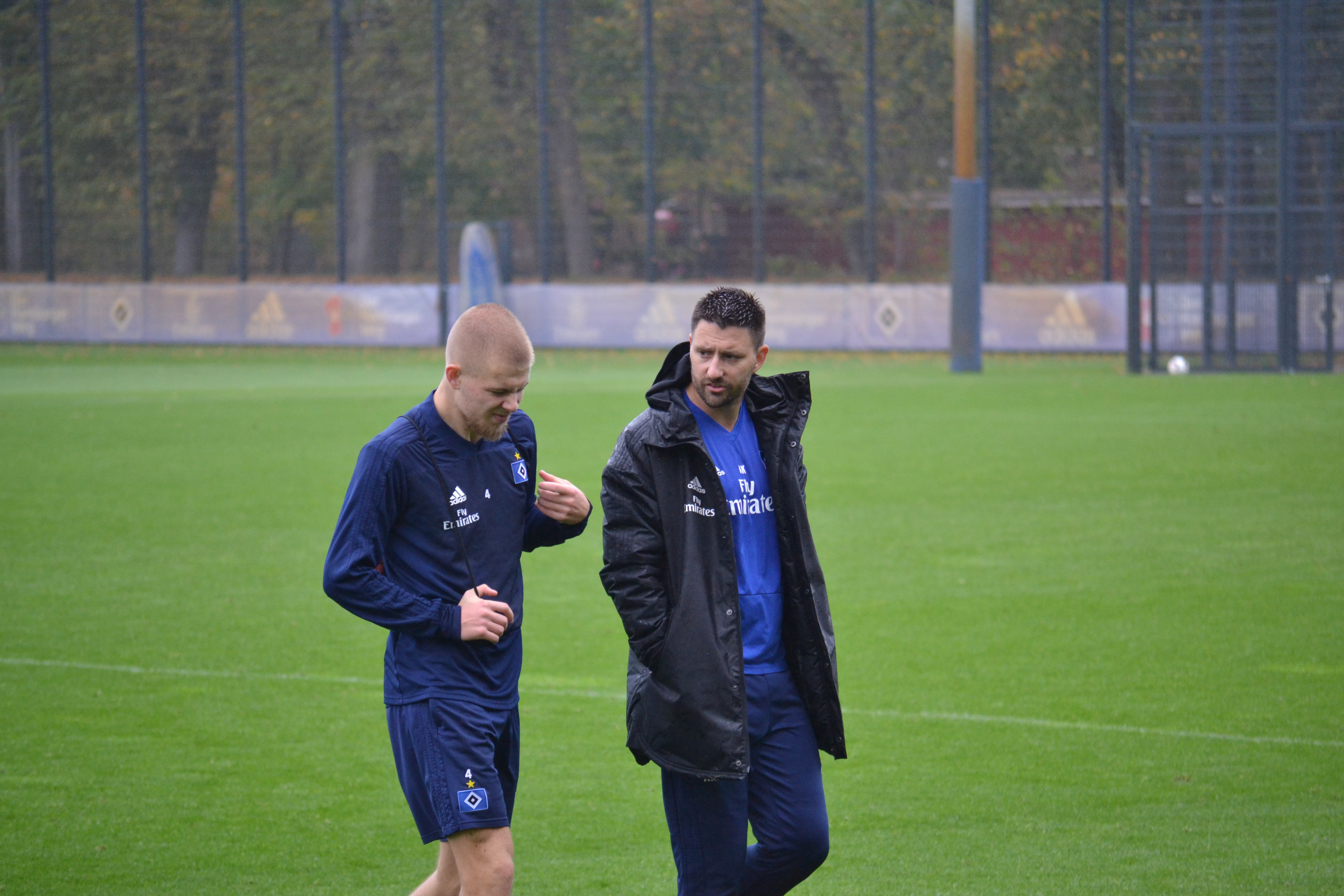
- André Kilian consulting with Rick van Drongelen during his time at Hamburger SV.

Personal information
- Date of birth: 18 May 1987 (age 39)
- Place of birth: Herne, West Germany
- Height: 1.83 m (6 ft 0 in)
- Positions: Left-back; defensive midfielder

Team information
- Current team: Hannover 96 (assistant)

Youth career
- Westfalia Herne
- 2000–2006: Schalke 04

Senior career*
Years	Team	Apps	(Gls)
2006–2010	Schalke 04 II	100	(2)
2010–2011	North Queensland Fury	19	(0)
2011–2017	FC Homburg	171	(18)
Total		290	(20)

Managerial career
- 2017–2018: FC 08 Homburg (assistant)
- 2018–2019: Hamburger SV (assistant)
- 2019–2020: Rot-Weiss Essen (assistant)
- 2021–2025: 1. FC Magdeburg (assistant)
- 2025–: Hannover 96 (assistant)
- * Club domestic league appearances and goals

André Kilian (born 18 May 1987) is a German football coach and former player who played as a left-back or defensive midfielder.

== Career ==
Kilian was born in Herne. He played in the Oberliga Westfalen and the Regionalliga West for Schalke 04 II however never broke through to the first team. In 2010, he moved abroad to Australia to play for the A-League club North Queensland Fury, before returning to Germany a year later to sign for FC 08 Homburg.
