= Eric Akoto =

Togolese footballer (born 1980)

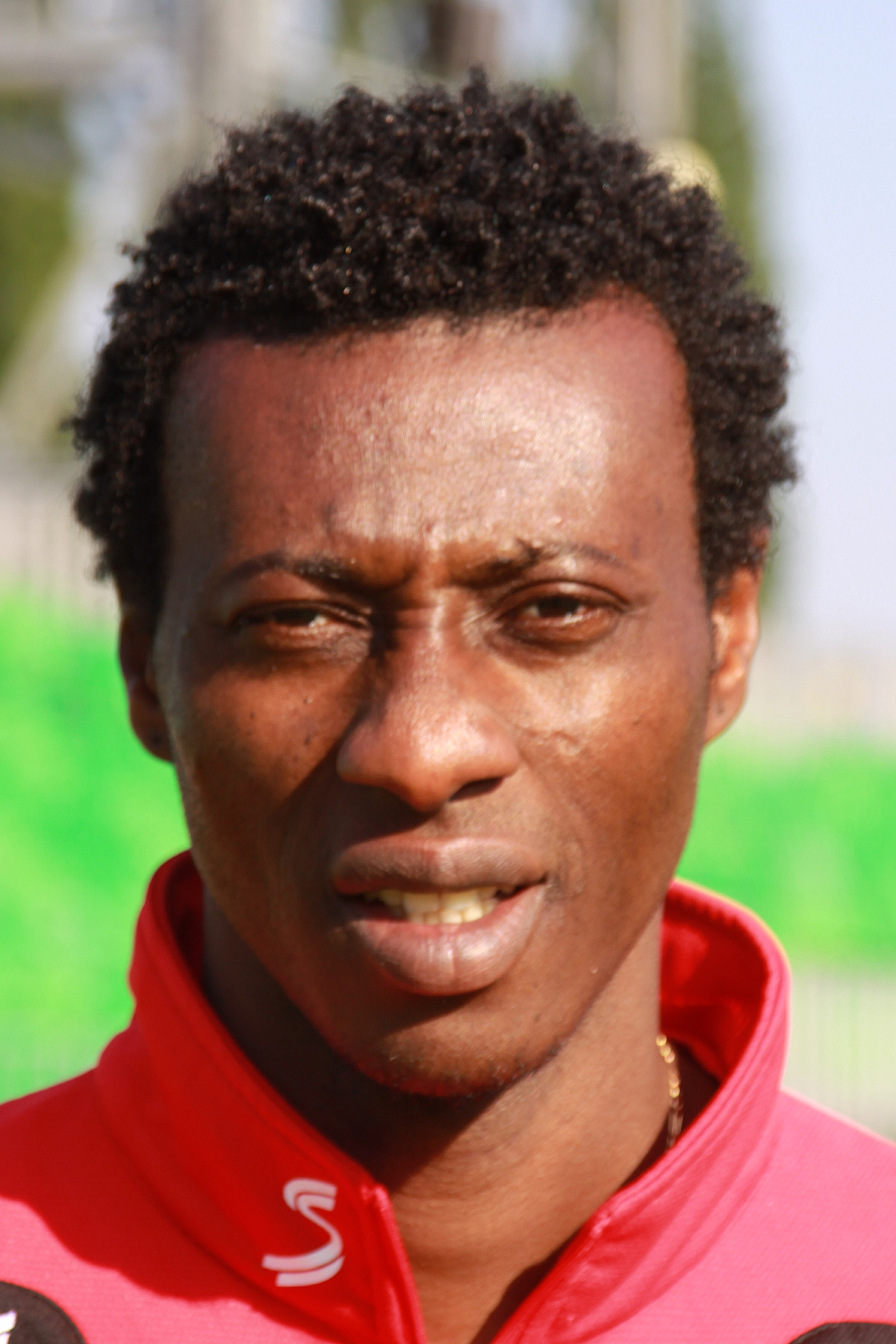
- Akoto with Kapfenberger SV in 2009

Personal information
- Full name: Eric Akoto
- Date of birth: 20 July 1980 (age 46)
- Place of birth: Accra, Ghana
- Height: 1.92 m (6 ft 4 in)
- Position: Centre-back

Senior career*
Years	Team	Apps	(Gls)
1998	Liberty Professionals		
1998–2002	Grazer AK	54	(2)
2002–2004	Austria Wien	40	(4)
2004–2005	Rot-Weiß Erfurt	4	(0)
2005–2006	Admira Wacker	17	(1)
2006–2007	Grazer AK	25	(0)
2007–2008	Interblock	30	(1)
2008–2009	Kapfenberger SV	15	(0)
2009	Maccabi Ahi Nazareth	9	(0)
2009–2010	OFI	3	(0)
2010–2011	North Queensland Fury	15	(0)
2011–2012	Floriana FC	15	(1)
2012–2013	Austria Klagenfurt	18	(3)

International career
2000–2009	Togo	56	(1)
- * Club domestic league appearances and goals

Eric Akoto (born 20 July 1980) is a naturalized Togolese former professional footballer who played as a centre-back. Born in Ghana, he represented the Togo national team at international level.

== Club career ==
Akoto was born in Accra, Ghana. He started his career in Ghana, at Liberty Professionals FC in 1998 before moving to Austria later that year to play for Grazer AK. In 2002, he moved to FK Austria Wien, before moving to Germany in 2004 to play for FC Rot-Weiß Erfurt. On 1 June 2005, he returned to Austria to play for VfB Admira Wacker Mödling. In 2006, he once again moved to Grazer AK. In July 2007 he moved to Slovenia signing for Interblock Ljubljana.

In the January 2008 transfer window, Akoto went on trial with Football League Championship club Blackpool in England. He moved in July 2008 from Slovenian PrvaLiga Telekom Slovenije club, Interblock Ljubljana to Austrian Bundesliga club Kapfenberger SV. In 2009, he moved to Maccabi Ahi Nazareth and later to OFI.

In July 2010, he signed with Australian A-League club North Queensland Fury FC where he played as a central defender. In the Fury's round 3 match versus Melbourne Victory, Akoto was red carded after an incident involving Kevin Muscat, where the Victory defender would not let Akoto pick up his mouthguard and resulted in Akoto pushing Muscat to the ground. Despite the incident being regarded as controversial by many media commentators, North Queensland opted against contesting the mandatory one-week suspension.

In December 2011, he signed for Floriana FC.

== International career ==
Born in the Ghanaian capital of Accra Akoto played for neighbouring Togo. He was part of the Togo national team's squad in the 2006 World Cup finals where Togo were knocked out of the competition in the group stages.

He was on the bus carrying the Togo team which was attacked by gunfire on 8 January 2010.
