= 2013 National Premier League Queensland =

NPL Queensland
- Season: 2013
- Champions: Olympic FC
- Premiers: Olympic FC
- Matches: 132
- Goals: 612 (4.64 per match)
- Top goalscorer: Antonio Murray (27 goals)
- Biggest home win: Redlands United 11-2 Central Queensland FC (24 March 2013); Sunshine Coast Fire 9-0 Central Queensland FC (9 June 2013)
- Biggest away win: Central Queensland FC 0–7 Sunshine Coast Fire (9 March 2013); FNQ FC Heat 0–7 Brisbane City (23 March 2013)
- Highest scoring: Redlands United 11-2 Central Queensland FC (24 March 2013)
- Longest winning run: Brisbane City (8)
- Longest unbeaten run: Brisbane City (13)
- Longest winless run: QAS (11)
- Longest losing run: QAS (8)

The 2013 National Premier League Queensland is the first season under the new competition format in Queensland. The league consists of 14 teams across the State of Queensland. Brisbane City, Olympic FC and Redlands United joined from the Brisbane Premier League. Brisbane Strikers, QAS and Sunshine Coast Fire joined from the previous Queensland State League. Central Queensland FC, FNQ FC Heat and Northern Fury each had sides from their cities participating in the previous Queensland State League but new consortiums won bids to participate in the NPL and new identities were created, Fury taking on the identity of the former A-League club North Queensland Fury.

Complete new entities, Western Pride FC and Moreton Bay Jets were formed while Palm Beach Sharks was drawn from the Gold Coast Premier League but were former participants in years gone past in the Brisbane Premier League.

== Teams ==
Team	Home city	Home ground
Brisbane City	Brisbane	Spencer Park
Brisbane Strikers	Brisbane	Perry Park
Central Queensland FC	Rockhampton	Rugby Park
FNQ FC Heat	Cairns & Mareeba	Barlow Park; Borzi Park
Moreton Bay Jets	Moreton Bay	Wolter Park
Northern Fury	Townsville	Townsville Sports Reserve; Brolga Park
Olympic FC	Brisbane	Goodwin Park
Palm Beach Sharks	Gold Coast	Mallawa Complex Field
QAS	Brisbane	Meakin Park
Redlands United	Brisbane	Cleveland Showgrounds
Sunshine Coast Fire	Sunshine Coast	Stockland Park
Western Pride FC	Ipswich	North Ipswich Reserve; Eric Evans Oval

== Regular season ==
The National Premier League Queensland 2013 season will be played over 22 rounds, beginning on 8 March with the regular season concluding on 18 August 2013.

Olympic FC went through the first round of matches undefeated with 10 wins and 1 draw. Their first loss was at the hands of Brisbane City who won their round 12 clash, 3-1. This was after Olympic defeated Brisbane City 6-2 in the inaugural NPL Queensland match.

The Round 3 match between Western Pride and Sunshine Coast Fire was called off at approximately the 80 minute mark due to a severe thunderstorm. Fire were leading 4-0 at the time and under the competition rules, were awarded the win.

The Round 10 match between Moreton Bay Jets and Western Pride was abandoned at the 80 minute mark due to an electrical floodlight failure. The Jets were leading 1-0 at the time and were awarded the victory under the competition rules.

Olympic FC claimed the Premiers title in Round 20 with a 3-1 victory over the Moreton Bay Jets at Goodwin Park on 4 August 2013.

Olympic FC, Brisbane City, Sunshine Coast Fire and the Brisbane Strikers formed the top four teams and therefore qualified for the finals series.

Pos	Team	Pld	W	D	L	GF	GA	GD	Pts	Qualification or relegation
1	Olympic FC (C)	22	18	1	3	90	39	+51	55	2013 National Premier Leagues Finals
2	Brisbane City	22	15	2	5	62	37	+25	47	2013 Queensland Finals
3	Sunshine Coast	22	15	1	6	61	22	+39	46	2013 Queensland Finals
4	Brisbane Strikers	22	14	0	8	63	38	+25	42	2013 Queensland Finals
5	Redlands United	22	12	3	7	72	39	+33	39	
6	Moreton Bay United	22	11	3	8	39	44	−5	36	
7	Northern Fury	22	9	5	8	48	43	+5	32	
8	Western Pride	22	8	3	11	41	49	−8	27	
9	Palm Beach	22	7	1	14	41	62	−21	22	
10	Far North Queensland	22	4	4	14	30	68	−38	16	
11	Central Queensland (R)	22	4	1	17	42	110	−68	13	Disbanded at end of season
12	Queensland Academy of Sport (R)	22	2	2	18	23	61	−38	8	Team withdrew to join NPL Queensland Youth competition

Updated to match(es) played on 25 August 2013. Source: sportingpulse.com
Rules for classification: 1) points; 2) goal difference; 3) number of goals scored.
(C) Champions; (R) Relegated

=== Managers ===
Team	Manager
Brisbane City	Glen Volker
Brisbane Strikers	David Large
Central Queensland FC	Raymond Wood
FNQ FC Heat	Martin Docherty (Joe Fenech - interim)
Moreton Bay Jets	Terry Kirkham
Northern Fury	Gareth Edds
Olympic FC	Jim Bellas
Palm Beach Sharks	Grae Piddock
QAS	Josh McCloughan
Redlands United	Matt Chandler
Sunshine Coast Fire	Kevin A'Hearne-Evans
Western Pride FC	Kasey Wehrman

=== Managerial changes ===
Team	Outgoing manager	Manner of departure	Date of vacancy	Table	Incoming manager	Date of appointment	Time
Central Queensland FC	Joe Fenech	Resigned	14 April 2013	12th	Raymond Wood	22 May 2013	Round 5
FNQ FC Heat	Martin Docherty	Has stood aside for 2013 season due to family illness	24 April 2013	10th	Joe Fenech (interim basis for remainder of 2013)	24 April 2013	Round 6
Palm Beach Sharks	Oscar Langone	Terminated	16 May 2013	10th	Grae Piddock	24 May 2013	Round 8

=== Home and away season ===
==== Week 1 ====
8 March 2013	Brisbane City	6-2	Olympic FC	Spencer Park, Brisbane
Friday 20:30	Howell 11'; Ingham 34'; Bryne 70', 89' (pen.); Smits 72', 75'	Report	Frazer 45', 60'	Attendance: 1,200

9 March 2013	Central Queensland FC	0-7	Sunshine Coast Fire	Rugby Park, Rockhampton
Saturday 19:00		Report	Toovey; Lynch; Zammitt; Bechar; Frew; Dwyer

9 March 2013	FNQ FC	4-1	Northern Fury	Barlow Park, Cairns
Saturday 19:30	Morrison 36'; Eigl 39', 73' (pen.); Carroll 90'	Report	Navarro 19'; Hudson (red card) 73'	Attendance: 500

10 March 2013	Western Pride FC	2-2	QAS	North Ipswich Reserve, Ipswich
Sunday 16:00	Drager 34'; Jordan 38'	Report	Yango 13'; Riis 87'	Attendance: 500

10 March 2013	Brisbane Strikers	2-1	Redlands United	Perry Park, Brisbane
Sunday 18:00	Taylor 19'; Robinson 69' (pen.)	Report	Macauace 79'	Attendance: 600

10 March 2013	Moreton Bay Jets	3-2	Palm Beach Sharks	Wolter Park, Brisbane
Sunday 18:30	Brownlie 46', 51', 66'	Report	Mckay 82', 90'

==== Week 2 ====
16 March 2013	Redlands United	2-0	FNQ FC	Spencer Park, Brisbane
Saturday 17:00	Brattan 67'; Fyfe 81'	Report		Attendance: 600

16 March 2013	Palm Beach Sharks	0-1	Western Pride FC	Mallawa Complex Field, Gold Coast
Saturday 17:30		Report	Dragar 81'	Attendance: 500

16 March 2013	Central Queensland FC	1-6	Northern Fury	Rugby Park, Rockhampton
Saturday 19:00	Geddes	Report	Kelly 10', 53'; Navarro 16'; Isman 66'; Richards 75'; Edds 80'; Waples (red card) 25'	Attendance: 100

16 March 2013	Brisbane City	3-5	Brisbane Strikers	Spencer Park, Brisbane
Saturday 19:30	Murray 8'; Riggs 10'; Frazier 75' (pen.)	Report	King 25'; Cokell 46'; Robinson 57'; Hews 79'; Thurtell 90+2'	Attendance: 600

17 March 2013	Sunshine Coast Fire	1-2	Moreton Bay Jets	Stockland Park, Sunshine Coast
Sunday 14:00	Dwyer 14'	Report	Dodd 48'; Capello 79'	Attendance: 500

17 March 2013	Olympic FC	5-0	QAS	Goodwin Park, Brisbane
Sunday 18:00	Smits 27', 37'; Fisk 43'; Maclean 68'; Ingham 78'	Report

==== Week 3 ====
23 March 2013	QAS	0-3	Palm Beach Sharks	Perry Park, Brisbane
Saturday 16:30		Report	Hilton 8'; Mckay 34'; Dillon 56'	Attendance: 600

23 March 2013	Moreton Bay Jets	3-0	Northern Fury	Wolter Park, Brisbane
Saturday 18:00	South 54'; Joseph 63'; McEvoy 82'	Report

23 March 2013	Brisbane Strikers	2-7	Olympic FC	Perry Park, Brisbane
Saturday 19:00	Thurtell 10'; Hews 87'	Report	Smits 33', 40', 70'; Robinson 3' (o.g.); Petrie 17'; Byrne 76'; Panic 89'	Attendance: 600

23 March 2013	FNQ FC	0-7	Brisbane City	Barlow Park, Cairns
Saturday 19:30		Report	Murray 28', 61'; Biggins 18'; Pase 20'; Blackadder 34'; Dougall 43'; Shannon 86'	Attendance: 600

24 March 2013	Redlands United	11-2	Central Queensland FC	Cleveland Showgrounds, Brisbane
Sunday 15:00	Way 39', 55', 56', 67', 75'; Fyfe 19', 58'; Saul 33'; Macauce 63'; O'Brien 82'; Snowdon 90'	Report	Geddes 35', 45'	Attendance: 400

24 March 2013	Western Pride FC	0-4	Sunshine Coast Fire	North Ipswich Reserve, Ipswich
Sunday 16:00		Report	Frew 4', 12'; Knight 55'; Smith 59'	Attendance: 400

==== Week 4 ====
5 April 2013	Olympic FC	3-1	Palm Beach Sharks	Goodwin Park, Brisbane
Friday 20:30	Smits 75', 88'; Byrne 45'	Report	Lucas 36'	Attendance: 450

6 April 2013	Brisbane Strikers	5-1	FNQ FC	Cleveland Showgrounds, Brisbane
Saturday 17:00	King 25', 60'; Thurtell 45' (pen.), 57'; Henderson 85'	Report	Eigl 5'	Attendance: 500

6 April 2013	Redlands United	3-1	Moreton Bay Jets	Cleveland Showgrounds, Brisbane
Saturday 19:30	Fyfe 45', 56' (pen.); Close 51'	Report	Brownlie 72'	Attendance: 500

7 April 2013	Sunshine Coast Fire	1-0	QAS	Stockland Park, Sunshine Coast
Sunday 14:00	Bechar 11'	Report		Attendance: 650

7 April 2013	Brisbane City	8-1	Central Queensland FC	Spencer Park, Brisbane
Sunday 15:00	Murray 20', 22', 55', 76', 88'; Biggins 61', 78'; Frazier 52'	Report	Geddes 77'	Attendance: 250

7 April 2013	Northern Fury	3-0	Western Pride FC	Townsville Sports Reserve, Townsville
Sunday 15:00	Navarro 35'; Mccarthy 50' (o.g.); Read 63'	Report		Attendance: 2,500

==== Week 5 ====
25 April 2013	Palm Beach Sharks	1-3	Sunshine Coast Fire	Mallawa Complex Field, Gold Coast
Thursday 15:30	Kyle 84'	Report	Lynch 25', 57'; Arnison 68' (pen.)

13 April 2013	Western Pride FC	1-4	Redlands United	North Ipswich Reserve, Ipswich
Saturday 18:00	Woodruffe 13'	Report	Close 44'; Fyfe 57'; Macuace 79', 83'

13 April 2013	Central Queensland FC	3-4	Brisbane Strikers	Rugby Park, Rockhampton
Saturday 19:00	Geddes 3', 64'; Waterland 75'	Report	Thurtell 9', 20', 52'; McVey 62'

13 April 2013	FNQ FC	1-1	Olympic FC	Barlow Park, Cairns
Saturday 19:30	Fernandez	Report	Byrne

2 June 2013	Moreton Bay Jets	1-3	Brisbane City	Wolter Park, Brisbane
Sunday 17:00	McEvoy 15'		Frazier 16', 19'; Biggins 20'

14 April 2013	Northern Fury	6-1	QAS	Townsville Sports Reserve, Townsville
Sunday 15:00	Read 7', 25', 34'; Eisenhutt 28'; Edds 80', 88'	Report	Cronin 23'

==== Week 6 ====
19 April 2013	Redlands United	3-1	QAS	Cleveland Showgrounds, Brisbane
Friday 18:30	Macuace 17'; Purcell 88'; Way 90+2'	Report	Yango 77'

20 April 2013	Northern Fury	2-2	Palm Beach Sharks	Townsville Sports Reserve, Townsville
Saturday 18:00	Stanley 2', Read 37'	Report	Lucas 63' (pen.), 72' (pen.)

20 April 2013	Brisbane Strikers	7-0	Moreton Bay Jets	Perry Park, Brisbane
Saturday 19:00	Thurtell 11'; King 27', 79', 87'; McVey 46'; Richter 57', 90+3'	Report

20 April 2013	FNQ FC	1-4	Central Queensland FC	Barlow Park, Cairns
Saturday 19:30	Sabbadin 19'	Report	Geddes 33', 75'; Waterland 66'; Wilson 88'

21 April 2013	Brisbane City	3-2	Western Pride FC	Goodwin Park, Brisbane
Sunday 16:00	Murray 65'; Pase 69'; Le Petit 84'	Report	Woodruffe 62'; Drager 88'

21 April 2013	Olympic FC	4-1	Sunshine Coast Fire	Goodwin Park, Brisbane
Sunday 18:00	McLean 37'; Ingham 73'; Tabulo 83'; Archibald 89'	Report	Zammit 61'

==== Week 7 ====
27 April 2013	QAS	0-2	Brisbane City	Wolter Park, Brisbane
Saturday 15:30		Report	Murray 51', 64'

27 April 2013	Moreton Bay Jets	2-3	FNQ FC	Wolter Park, Brisbane
Saturday 18:00	South 32'; McEvoy 36'	Report	Murphy 1'; Sabbadin 28'; Carroll 54'

27 April 2013	Central Queensland FC	3-9	Olympic FC	Rugby Park, Rockhampton
Saturday 19:00	Waterland 23'; Geddes 32' (pen.); Miller 89' (pen.)	Report	Ingham 2'; Archibald 9'; OG 26'; Smits 45+1', 71', 77'; Byrne 49'; Tabulo 68'; Heath 88'

28 April 2013	Sunshine Coast Fire	2-1	Northern Fury	Stockland Park, Sunshine Coast
Sunday 14:00	Dwyer 1'; Bechar 80'	Report	Navarro 49'

28 April 2013	Western Pride FC	0-4	Brisbane Strikers	North Ipswich Reserve, Ipswich
Sunday 16:00		Report	Thurtell 10'; King 38'; Richter 45+1'; Taylor 72'

28 April 2013	Palm Beach Sharks	4-7	Redlands United	Mallawa Complex Field, Gold Coast
Sunday 17:30	Kyle 61'; Lucas 82', 88' (pen.); Rodriguez 89'	Report	Way 2', 40'; Barbarouses 32'; Fyfe 35', 56', 81' (pen.); Macuace 63'

==== Week 8 ====
3 May 2013	Brisbane Strikers	1-2	QAS	Perry Park, Brisbane
Friday 19:30	Henderson 45'	Report	Yango 26'; Sibatuara 53'

4 May 2013	Redlands United	3-3	Sunshine Coast Fire	Cleveland Showgrounds, Brisbane
Saturday 18:00	Way 70'; Macuace 83', 84'	Report	Dwyer 20'; Lynch 29'; Arnison 78' (pen.)

4 May 2013	Olympic FC	5-3	Northern Fury	Goodwin Park, Brisbane
Saturday 18:00	Efstathis 21'; McLean 24'; Smits 38'; Tabulo 46'; Byrne 50'	Report	Read 5'; Waples 48'; Navarro 76'

4 May 2013	Central Queensland FC	1-2	Moreton Bay Jets	Rugby Park, Rockhampton
Saturday 19:00	Geddes 59' (pen.)	Report	McEvoy 13', 24'

5 May 2013	Western Pride FC	3-0	FNQ FC	Eric Evans Oval, Ipswich
Sunday 14:45	Drager 29', 82'; Woodruffe 51' (pen.)	Report

5 May 2013	Brisbane City	4-2	Palm Beach Sharks	Spencer Park, Brisbane
Sunday 16:00	Murray 21', 80', 90+3'; Pase 85'	Report	Kyle 31'; Lucas 34'

==== Week 9 ====
11 May 2013	Palm Beach Sharks	3-2	Brisbane Strikers	Mallawa Complex Field, Gold Coast
Saturday 17:30	Panic 16', 27'; Kyle 33'	Report	King 45'; Taylor 90+3'

11 May 2013	Moreton Bay Jets	1-3	Olympic FC	Wolter Park, Brisbane
Saturday 18:00	Brownlie 61'	Report	Byrne 6', 90+4'; Heath 83'

11 May 2013	Northern Fury	4-2	Redlands United	Townsville Sports Reserve, Townsville
Saturday 18:00	Edds 34' (pen.); Read 51', 72'; Navarro 86'	Report	Way 47', 53'

11 May 2013	Western Pride FC	6-2	Central Queensland FC	Eric Evans Oval, Ipswich
Saturday 19:30	Drager 30', 60', 90+3'; Woodruffe 40', 45'; Jordan 57'	Report	Waterland 24'; Crowley 83'

12 May 2013	Sunshine Coast Fire	0-1	Brisbane City	Stockland Park, Sunshine Coast
Sunday 14:00		Report	Murray 85'

12 May 2013	QAS	2-3	FNQ FC	Meakin Park, Brisbane
Sunday 15:30	Ronto 42'; Schiavo 90+2'	Report	Carroll 35' (pen.), 56' (pen.), 76'

==== Week 10 ====
17 May 2013	Redlands United	3-5	Olympic FC	Cleveland Showgrounds, Brisbane
Friday 18:30	Fyfe 8'; Way 18'; Macuace 25'	Report	Byrne 13', 35', 45+1', 78'; Tabulo 66'

18 May 2013	Central Queensland FC	3-2	QAS	Martens Oval, Bundaberg
Saturday 18:00	Crowley 9'; Geddes 48'; Millar 80'	Report	Hoffman 19'; Cronin 63'

18 May 2013	Brisbane Strikers	3-0	Sunshine Coast Fire	Perry Park, Brisbane
Saturday 19:00	Richter 59'; Taylor 83'; McVey 90+3'	Report

18 May 2013	Moreton Bay Jets	1-0	Western Pride FC	Wolter Park, Brisbane
Saturday 19:00	South 40'	Report

18 May 2013	FNQ FC	0-3	Palm Beach Sharks	Barlow Park, Cairns
Saturday 19:30		Report	Crazia 61'; Hilton 86', 90+2'

19 May 2013	Brisbane City	5-0	Northern Fury	Spencer Park, Brisbane
Sunday 15:00	Dougall 10'; Frazier 27', 64'; Murray 59'; Sakurai 82'	Report

==== Week 11 ====
25 May 2013	Palm Beach Sharks	5-4	Central Queensland FC	Mallawa Complex Field, Gold Coast
Saturday 17:30	Camilleri 4', 13'; Lucas 58', 71'; Panic 84'	Report	Geddes 22', 30' (pen.), 40', 54'

25 May 2013	Redlands United	3-3	Brisbane City	Cleveland Showgrounds, Brisbane
Saturday 18:00	Barbarouses 33'; Fyfe 69'; Way 74'	Report	Murray 26'; Le Petit 63'; Biggins 80'

25 May 2013	Northern Fury	0-3	Brisbane Strikers	Townsville Sports Reserve, Townsville
Saturday 18:00		Report	Angus 13'; Taylor 35', 82'

25 May 2013	QAS	2-2	Moreton Bay Jets	Wolter Park, Brisbane
Saturday 19:30	Yango 15' (pen.); Klaassen 87'	Report	Brownlie 20'; Joseph 32'

26 May 2013	Sunshine Coast Fire	4-0	FNQ FC	Stockland Park, Sunshine Coast
Sunday 14:00	Arnison 22' (pen.); Knight 39'; Verdin 47'; Lynch 58'	Report

26 May 2013	Western Pride FC	0-1	Olympic FC	Eric Evans Oval, Ipswich
Sunday 16:00		Report	Own Goal 35' (o.g)

==== Week 12 ====
8 June 2013	Palm Beach Sharks	0-1	Moreton Bay Jets	Mallawa Complex Field, Gold Coast
Saturday 17:30		Report	Sheumack 18'	Referee: Adam Kersey

8 June 2013	QAS	1-2	Western Pride FC	Kippen Park, Goodna
Saturday 18:00	Ronto 89' (pen.)	Report	Martinez 10'; Woodruffe 51' (pen.)	Referee: Ben Cook

8 June 2013	Redlands United	3-0	Brisbane Strikers	Cleveland Showgrounds, Brisbane
Saturday 18:00	Brattan 53'; Close 80'; Barbarouses 84'	Report		Referee: Chris Beath

9 June 2013	Sunshine Coast Fire	9-0	Central Queensland FC	Stockland Park, Sunshine Coast
Sunday 14:00	Dwyer 6'; Bechar 21', 44', 82'; Lynch 32', 38', 48'; Verdin 67'; Toovey 79'	Report		Referee: Jason Crow

9 June 2013	Northern Fury	1-1	FNQ FC	Townsville Sports Reserve, Townsville
Sunday 15:00	Navarro 3'	Report	Beverley 90'	Referee: Alex King

9 June 2013	Olympic FC	1-3	Brisbane City	Goodwin Park, Brisbane
Sunday 17:00	Ingham 6'	Report	Murray 8'; Frazier 41', 70'	Referee: Sam Williams

==== Week 13 ====
14 June 2013	QAS	0-2	Olympic FC	Goodwin Park, Brisbane
Friday 20:30		Report	Smits 28'; Ingham 62'	Referee: David Wiebe

15 June 2013	FNQ FC	2-4	Redlands United	Borzi Park, Mareeba
Saturday 19:30	Nucifora 38'; Carroll 50'	Report	Fyfe 24' (pen.), 48', 80'; Barbarouses 85'

15 June 2013	Northern Fury	2-2	Central Queensland FC	Brolga Park, Townsville
Saturday 19:30	Richards 27'; Read 75'	Report	Geddes 23', 60'

15 June 2013	Moreton Bay Jets	2-0	Sunshine Coast Fire	Wolter Park, Brisbane
Saturday 19:30	Brownlie 31' (pen.), 90+1'	Report		Referee: Alan Milliner

24 August 2013	Brisbane Strikers	2-0	Brisbane City	Perry Park, Brisbane
Saturday 19:00	Richter 44'; Angus 52'	Report		Referee: Sam Williams

25 August 2013	Western Pride FC	4-2	Palm Beach Sharks	Kippen Park, Goodna
Sunday 15:00	Drager 10', 36', 43'; Rule 26'		Lucas 79'; Grimley 89'	Referee: Graham Buzzi

==== Week 14 ====
22 June 2013	Palm Beach Sharks	3-2	QAS	Mallawa Complex Field, Gold Coast
Saturday 17:30	Lucas 36', 74'; McKay 90+2'	Report	Klaasen 6'; Bladen 25'	Referee: Jason Crow

22 June 2013	Brisbane City	1-1	FNQ FC	Spencer Park, Brisbane
Saturday 18:00	Frazier 41'	Report	Carroll 60'	Referee: Matt Skinner

22 June 2013	Central Queensland FC	0-5	Redlands United	Jardine Park, Rockhampton
Saturday 19:00		Report	Way 19'; Close 24'; Cokell 33'; Barbarouses 34'; Bow 60'	Referee: Sam Williams

22 June 2013	Northern Fury	2-2	Moreton Bay Jets	Townsville Sports Reserve, Townsville
Saturday 19:00	Morrison 62'; Read 71'	Report	Brownlie 47' (pen.), 69'	Referee: Graham Buzzi

23 June 2013	Sunshine Coast Fire	2-0	Western Pride FC	Stockland Park, Sunshine Coast
Sunday 14:00	Knight 8', 90+4'	Report		Referee: Casey Reibelt

23 June 2013	Olympic FC	6-2	Brisbane Strikers	Goodwin Park, Brisbane
Sunday 17:00	Heath 10'; Smits 16', 29', 40'; Byrne 18' (pen.); Ingham 27'	Report	King 51'; McVey 53'	Referee: Alan Milliner

==== Week 15 ====
29 June 2013	QAS	0-2	Sunshine Coast Fire	Eric Evans Oval, Ipswich
Saturday 14:00		Report	Scarff 42', 52'	Referee: Nathan MacDonald

29 June 2013	Palm Beach Sharks	0-6	Olympic FC	Mallawa Complex Field, Gold Coast
Saturday 17:30		Report	Smits 5', 20', 31'; Heath 9'; Ingham 40'; Ito 86'

29 June 2013	Western Pride FC	0-2	Northern Fury	Eric Evans Oval, Ipswich
Saturday 18:00		Report	Read 15'; Eisenhutt 47'	Referee: Joseph Lee

29 June 2013	Central Queensland FC	1-2	Brisbane City	Jardine Park, Rockhampton
Saturday 19:00	Lancaster 9'	Report	Murray 68' (pen.), 80'	Referee: Ashley Stout

29 June 2013	FNQ FC	0-4	Brisbane Strikers	Endeavour Park, Cairns
Saturday 19:30		Report	McVey 27', 67'; Bradford 37'; De Nittis 77'	Referee: Adam Kersey

29 June 2013	Moreton Bay Jets	1-4	Redlands United	Wolter Park, Brisbane
Saturday 19:30	Robinson 45+2' (o.g.)	Report	Bow 52'; Fyfe 57'; Macuace 74', 79'

==== Week 16 ====
5 July 2013	Brisbane City	1-0	Moreton Bay Jets	Spencer Park, Brisbane
Friday 20:30	Frazier 80'	Report		Referee: David Wiebe

6 July 2013	QAS	0-3	Northern Fury	Perry Park, Brisbane
Saturday 16:30		Report	Robinson 2'; Eisenhutt 49'; Kelly 77'	Referee: Alex King

6 July 2013	Redlands United	1-3	Western Pride FC	Cleveland Showgrounds, Brisbane
Saturday 18:00	Macuace 72'	Report	Purdy 55' (pen.); Drager 75'; Jordan 80'	Referee: Alan Milliner

6 July 2013	Brisbane Strikers	8-1	Central Queensland FC	Perry Park, Brisbane
Saturday 19:30	Bradford 2', 77'; Own Goal 18', 85'; Richter 55', 61'; McVey 63', 69'	Report	Waterland 81'	Referee: Jason Crow

7 July 2013	Sunshine Coast Fire	4-0	Palm Beach Sharks	Stockland Park, Sunshine Coast
Sunday 14:00	Dwyer 51'; Bechar 59'; Firth 69', 84'	Report		Referee: Jarred Gillett

7 July 2013	Olympic FC	4-2	FNQ FC	Goodwin Park, Brisbane
Sunday 15:00	Bowater 27'; Smits 35', 62'; Ingham 45+1'	Report	Morrison 34'; Tom Murphy 78'	Referee: Matt Skinner

==== Week 17 ====
12 July 2013	QAS	1-5	Redlands United	Cleveland Showgrounds, Brisbane
Friday 18:30		Report	Macuace 22', 71'; Way 34', 41'; Fyfe 88' (pen.)	Referee: Nathaniel Robb

13 July 2013	Palm Beach Sharks	1-2	Northern Fury	Mallawa Complex Field, Gold Coast
Saturday 17:30	Own Goal 47'	Report	Eisenhutt 25'; Edwards 81'	Referee: Chris Beath

13 July 2013	Western Pride FC	4-2	Brisbane City	North Ipswich Reserve, Ipswich
Saturday 18:00	Munn 1'; Woodruffe 29'; Jordan 82'; Drager 87'	Report	Murray 45'; Joo 90+1'

13 July 2013	Central Queensland FC	3-4	FNQ FC	Rugby Park, Rockhampton
Saturday 19:00	Waterland 17', 90+3'; Miller 23'	Report	Beverley 32'; Fernandez 37'; Morrison 51', 87'	Referee: Nathan MacDonald

14 July 2013	Sunshine Coast Fire	2-3	Olympic FC	Stockland Park, Sunshine Coast
Sunday 14:00	Dwyer 6'; Sato 26'	Report	Byrne 13', 61'; Smits 67'	Referee: David Costello

21 August 2013	Moreton Bay Jets	2-1	Brisbane Strikers	Wolter Park, Brisbane
Wednesday 19:30	Scheumack 18'; Brownlie 68'	Report	Richter 85'	Referee: David Wiebe

==== Week 18 ====
19 July 2013	Brisbane City	3-0	QAS	Spencer Park, Brisbane
Friday 20:30	Bird 18'; Murray 42' (pen.); Pase 59'	Report		Referee: Alex King

20 July 2013	Northern Fury	0-2	Sunshine Coast Fire	Townsville Sports Reserve, Townsville
Saturday 18:00		Report	Knight 58' Henslee 69'	Referee: Casey Reibelt

20 July 2013	Brisbane Strikers	3-2	Western Pride FC	Perry Park, Brisbane
Saturday 19:00	McVey 29'; Coulson 45+1'; King 63'	Report	Drager 9', 19'	Referee: Michael Bozoff

20 July 2013	FNQ FC	0-2	Moreton Bay Jets	Borzi Park, Mareeba
Saturday 19:30		Report	Own Goal 53'; Zappone 67'	Referee: Matt Gillett

21 July 2013	Olympic FC	7-0	Central Queensland FC	Goodwin Park, Brisbane
Sunday 15:00	McLean 3', 57'; Smits 29'; Byrne 34'; Mundy 48'; Psaros 79'; Spirko 90+1'	Report		Referee: David Wiebe

14 August 2013	Redlands United	7-1	Palm Beach Sharks	Cleveland Showgrounds, Brisbane
Wednesday 19:30	Way 28', 68', 86' (pen.), 89'; Macuace 44', 58'; Stubbs 65'	Report	Kyle 13'	Referee: Alan Milliner

==== Week 19 ====
25 July 2013	QAS	0-2	Brisbane Strikers	Perry Park, Brisbane
Thursday 19:30		Report	Henderson 57'; Richter 73'	Referee: Rebecca Durcau

27 July 2013	Palm Beach Sharks	0-2	Brisbane City	Mallawa Complex Field, Gold Coast
Saturday 17:30		Report	Own Goal 14'; Bird 90+4'	Referee: Alex King

27 July 2013	Northern Fury	6-3	Olympic FC	Townsville Sports Reserve, Townsville
Saturday 18:00	Edds 17', 41' (pen.), 43', 57'; Eisenhutt 20'; Kelly 51'	Report	Smits 23'; Howell 56'; Ingham 77'	Referee: Graham Buzzi

27 July 2013	FNQ FC	2-2	Western Pride FC	Borzi Park, Mareeba
Saturday 19:00	Morrison 25'; Carroll 47' (pen.)	Report	Own Goal 19'; Rule 42'	Referee: Jason Crow

27 July 2013	Moreton Bay Jets	5-4	Central Queensland FC	Wolter Park, Brisbane
Saturday 19:30	Brownlie 6', 16'; Kaimarama 20'; Scheumack 44'; Own Goal 45+1'	Report	Jansen 10'; Miller 37'; B. Crowley 56'; Waterland 65'	Referee: Matt Skinner

28 July 2013	Sunshine Coast Fire	1-0	Redlands United	Stockland Park, Sunshine Coast
Sunday 14:00	Bechar 10'	Report		Referee: Adam Kersey

==== Week 20 ====
3 August 2013	Redlands United	0-0	Northern Fury	Cleveland Showgrounds, Brisbane
Saturday 18:00		Report		Referee: Casey Reibelt

3 August 2013	Brisbane City	1-6	Sunshine Coast Fire	Spencer Park, Brisbane
Saturday 18:00	Murray 79'	Report	Barlow 14'; Dwyer 17', 41', 57'; Verdin 27'; Henslee 35'	Referee: Jarred Gillett

3 August 2013	Brisbane Strikers	3-0	Palm Beach Sharks	Perry Park, Brisbane
Saturday 19:00	Taylor 65'; Hews 67'; King 87' (pen.)	Report		Referee: Jason Crow

3 August 2013	Central Queensland FC	4-2	Western Pride FC	Rugby Park, Rockhampton
Saturday 19:00	Miller 22', 60'; Hardwick 42'; Jacob Crowley 64'	Report	Munn 48'; Rule 78'	Referee: Alan Milliner

3 August 2013	FNQ FC	2-5	QAS	Barlow Park, Cairns
Saturday 19:30	Morrison 54'; Fernandez 84'	Report	Bladen 12'; Sibatuara 38', 68'; Ronto 71'; Own Goal 88'	Referee: Graham Buzzi

4 August 2013	Olympic FC	3-1	Moreton Bay Jets	Goodwin Park, Brisbane
Sunday 17:00	Byrne 44', 71'; Smits 48'	Report	Brownlie 50'	Referee: Matt Skinner

==== Week 21 ====
10 August 2013	Western Pride FC	2-2	Moreton Bay Jets	North Ipswich Reserve, Ipswich
Saturday 18:00	Drager 19', 32'	Report	Brownlie 67', 76'	Referee: Ben Cook

11 August 2013	QAS	0-3	Central Queensland FC	Rugby Park, Rockhampton
Sunday 13:00		Report	Fraser 84'; B Crowley 90'; Miller 90+3'	Referee: Sam Williams

11 August 2013	Palm Beach Sharks	3-2	FNQ FC	Mallawa Complex Field, Gold Coast
Sunday 14:00	Lucas 29', 31', 47'	Report	Beverley 51'; Morrison 65'	Referee: Matt Gillett

11 August 2013	Sunshine Coast Fire	2-0	Brisbane Strikers	Stockland Park, Sunshine Coast
Sunday 14:00	Barlow 49', 56' (pen.)	Report		Referee: Alan Milliner

11 August 2013	Northern Fury	2-4	Brisbane City	Townsville Sports Reserve, Townsville
Sunday 15:00	Cobbo 34'; Eisenhutt 55'	Report	Murray 16', 76', 89'; Pase 54'	Referee: Graham Buzzi

11 August 2013	Olympic FC	2-1	Redlands United	Goodwin Park, Brisbane
Sunday 17:00	Efstathis 16'; Ingham 71'	Report	Robinson 54'	Referee: Adam Kersey

==== Week 22 ====
17 August 2013	Brisbane City	2-0	Redlands United	Spencer Park, Brisbane
Saturday 18:00	Murray 26'; Perico 64'	Report		Referee: Casey Reibelt

17 August 2013	Central Queensland FC	0-5	Palm Beach Sharks	Rugby Park, Rockhampton
Saturday 19:00		Report	Kyle 1', 56'; Hulme 29'; Stross 58'; Lucas 63'	Referee: Anthony Kiely

17 August 2013	FNQ FC	1-5	Sunshine Coast Fire	Stratford United, Cairns
Saturday 19:30	Morrison 12'	Report	Scarff 25', 42', 43'; Bechar 27'; Barlow 30' (pen.)	Referee: Lee MacMaster

17 August 2013	Moreton Bay Jets	3-2	QAS	Wolter Park, Brisbane
Saturday 19:30	Capello 68'; McNeil 77'; Marraiya 79'	Report	Own Goal 10'; Sibatuara 19'	Referee: Alex King

18 August 2013	Brisbane Strikers	0-2	Northern Fury	Perry Park, Brisbane
Sunday 15:00		Report	Kelly 22'; Edds 28'	Referee: Matt Gillett

18 August 2013	Olympic FC	4-5	Western Pride FC	Goodwin Park, Brisbane
Sunday 17:00	Ingham 1', 40', 59'; Smits 37'	Report	Drager 29', 89'; Woodruffe 34', 71', 80'	Referee: Rebecca Durcau

== Finals series ==
=== Semi-finals ===
31 August 2013	Brisbane City	2-0 (a.e.t.)	Sunshine Coast Fire	Spencer Park, Newmarket
Saturday 19:00	Dougall 103'; Sharov 116'	Report

1 September 2013	Olympic FC	2-0	Brisbane Strikers	Goodwin Park, Yeronga
Sunday 18:00	Smits 65'; Matt Byrne 67'	Report		Referee: Alex King

=== Grand Final ===
8 September 2013	Olympic FC	3-3 (a.e.t.) (3 – 0 p)	Brisbane City	Goodwin Park, Yeronga
Sunday 18:00	Heath 79'; D.Byrne 84' (pen.); Ito 106'	Report	Bird 19'; Dougall 53' (pen.); Biggins 112'	Referee: Sam Williams
	Penalties
	McLean (penalty scored); Ito (penalty scored); D.Byrne (penalty scored)		(penalty missed) Dougall; (penalty missed) Bird; (penalty missed) Biggins

== Top Goalscorers ==
Pos	Player	Club	Goals
1	Antonio Murray	Brisbane City	27
2	Tim Smits	Olympic FC	26
3	Reuben Way	Redlands United	20
=4	Danny Byrne	Olympic FC	19
=4	Peter Drager	Western Pride FC	19

== Top Goalscorers by Club ==
Club	Player	Goals
Brisbane City	Antonio Murray	27
Brisbane Strikers	Greg King	11
Central Queensland Energy	Chris Geddes	17
FNQ FC Heat	Jamie Carroll and Cameron Morrison	8
Moreton Bay Jets	Royce Brownlie	16
Northern Fury	Alex Read	12
Olympic FC	Tim Smits	26
Palm Beach Sharks	Chris Lucas	15
QAS	Abraham Yango and Sam Sibatuara	4
Redlands United	Reuben Way	20
Sunshine Coast Fire	Leon Dwyer	10
Western Pride FC	Peter Drager	19

== See also ==
- National Premier League Queensland
- Football Queensland
