= 2013 National Premier Leagues =

National Premier Leagues
- Season: 2013
- Champions: Sydney United 58 (1st Title)
- Finalists: Campbelltown City; Canberra; Olympic; South Hobart; Sydney United 58

The 2013 National Premier Leagues was the inaugural season of the Australian National Premier Leagues soccer competition. It began on 22 February 2013 and concluded on 13 October 2013. The National Premier Leagues was contested by clubs from five divisions. The divisions were ACT, NSW, Queensland, South Australia and Tasmania. The winners of each respective divisional league then competed in a finals playoff tournament at season end, culminating in a grand final.

Sydney United 58 were crowned National Premier Leagues Champions.

== League tables ==
=== ACT ===
Pos	Team	Pld	W	D	L	GF	GA	GD	Pts	Qualification or relegation
1	Canberra	23	18	0	5	86	22	+64	54	2013 National Premier Leagues Finals
2	Belconnen United	23	15	2	6	49	33	+16	47	2013 ACT Finals
3	Canberra Olympic (C)	23	13	6	4	47	25	+22	45	2013 ACT Finals
4	Woden Valley	23	13	2	8	58	45	+13	41	2013 ACT Finals
5	Cooma Tigers	23	10	1	12	46	54	−8	31	
6	Australian Institute of Sport	16	7	3	6	28	26	+2	24	
7	Canberra City	23	6	1	16	41	61	−20	19	
8	Monaro Panthers	23	6	1	16	30	78	−48	19	
9	Tuggeranong United	23	3	2	18	30	71	−41	11	

Source: sportingpulse.com
Rules for classification: 1) points; 2) goal difference; 3) number of goals scored.
(C) Champions

==== Finals ====
Semi-finals
1	Canberra FC	4
2	Belconnen United	0
3	Canberra Olympic	3
4	Woden Valley	1

Preliminary final
2	Belconnen United	2
3	Canberra Olympic	4

Grand final
1	Canberra FC	0
3	Canberra Olympic	2

=== NSW ===
Pos	Team	Pld	W	D	L	GF	GA	GD	Pts	Qualification or relegation
1	Sydney United 58	22	14	3	5	46	30	+16	45	2013 National Premier Leagues Finals
2	Sutherland Sharks	22	13	5	4	47	26	+21	44	2013 NSW Finals
3	Bonnyrigg White Eagles (C)	22	13	4	5	44	30	+14	43	2013 NSW Finals
4	Rockdale City Suns	22	11	6	5	37	21	+16	39	2013 NSW Finals
5	Marconi Stallions	22	11	4	7	29	26	+3	37	2013 NSW Finals
6	Blacktown City	22	10	6	6	44	32	+12	36	
7	Sydney Olympic	22	8	5	9	30	29	+1	29	
8	Manly United	22	6	8	8	34	35	−1	26	
9	Blacktown Spartans	22	6	5	11	28	31	−3	23	
10	Central Coast Mariners Academy (R)	22	4	3	15	30	62	−32	15	Relegated to the 2014 NPL NSW 2
11	APIA Leichhardt Tigers	22	2	8	12	29	48	−19	14	
12	South Coast Wolves	22	3	5	14	28	53	−25	14	

Source: sportingpulse.com
Rules for classification: 1) points; 2) goal difference; 3) number of goals scored.
(C) Champions; (R) Relegated

==== Finals ====
Qualifying final
2	Sutherland Sharks	2
3	Bonnyrigg White Eagles	5
4	Rockdale City Suns	1 (4)
5	Marconi Stallions	1 (2)

Major semi-final
1	Sydney United 58	1 (3)
3	Bonnyrigg White Eagles	1 (5)
Minor semi-final
2	Sutherland Sharks	1
4	Rockdale City Suns	2

Preliminary final
1	Sydney United 58	2 (3)
4	Rockdale City Suns	2 (4)

Grand final
3	Bonnyrigg White Eagles	1
4	Rockdale City Suns	0

=== Queensland ===
Pos	Team	Pld	W	D	L	GF	GA	GD	Pts	Qualification or relegation
1	Olympic FC (C)	22	18	1	3	90	39	+51	55	2013 National Premier Leagues Finals
2	Brisbane City	22	15	2	5	62	37	+25	47	2013 Queensland Finals
3	Sunshine Coast	22	15	1	6	61	22	+39	46	2013 Queensland Finals
4	Brisbane Strikers	22	14	0	8	63	38	+25	42	2013 Queensland Finals
5	Redlands United	22	12	3	7	72	39	+33	39	
6	Moreton Bay United	22	11	3	8	39	44	−5	36	
7	Northern Fury	22	9	5	8	48	43	+5	32	
8	Western Pride	22	8	3	11	41	49	−8	27	
9	Palm Beach	22	7	1	14	41	62	−21	22	
10	Far North Queensland	22	4	4	14	30	68	−38	16	
11	Central Queensland (R)	22	4	1	17	42	110	−68	13	Disbanded at end of season
12	Queensland Academy of Sport (R)	22	2	2	18	23	61	−38	8	Team withdrew to join NPL Queensland Youth competition

Source: sportingpulse.com
Rules for classification: 1) points; 2) goal difference; 3) number of goals scored.
(C) Champions; (R) Relegated

==== Finals ====
Semi-finals
1	Olympic	2
4	Brisbane Strikers	0
2	Brisbane City	2
3	Sunshine Coast	0

Grand final
1	Olympic	3 (3)
2	Brisbane City	3 (0)

=== South Australia ===
Pos	Team	Pld	W	D	L	GF	GA	GD	Pts	Qualification or relegation
1	North Eastern MetroStars	26	20	2	4	48	16	+32	62	2013 SA Finals
2	Adelaide Blue Eagles	26	14	7	5	48	27	+21	49	2013 SA Finals
3	Adelaide City	26	15	3	8	58	29	+29	48	2013 SA Finals
4	Campbelltown City (C)	26	13	7	6	50	28	+22	46	2013 National Premier Leagues Finals
5	Adelaide Raiders	26	12	5	9	45	40	+5	41	2013 SA Finals
6	Cumberland United	26	11	8	7	38	39	−1	41	2013 SA Finals
7	West Torrens Birkalla	26	11	5	10	44	36	+8	38	
8	Western Strikers	26	10	6	10	40	45	−5	36	
9	Para Hills Knights	26	10	5	11	47	45	+2	35	
10	White City	26	9	4	13	45	45	0	31	
11	Croydon Kings	26	7	7	12	32	45	−13	28	
12	Adelaide Comets	26	6	6	14	35	54	−19	24	
13	Adelaide Cobras (R)	26	5	4	17	28	62	−34	19	Relegated to the 2014 SA State League
14	Enfield City (R)	26	2	5	19	19	66	−47	−19 (Note: Enfield City were deducted 30 points after the FFSA found eight players 'did not meet the definition of an amateur player based on club player payment agreements'.)	Disbanded at end of season

Source: sportingpulse.com
Rules for classification: 1) points; 2) goal difference; 3) number of goals scored.
(C) Champions; (R) Relegated

==== Finals ====
Elimination finals
3	Adelaide City	0
6	Cumberland United	1
4	Campbelltown City	3
5	Adelaide Raiders	1

Semifinals
1	North Eastern MetroStars	1	0 (1)
2	Adelaide Blue Eagles	1	1 (2)
Cumberland United	2
Campbelltown City	3

Preliminary final
North Eastern MetroStars	0
Campbelltown City	1

Grand final
Adelaide Blue Eagles	1
Campbelltown City	2

=== Tasmania ===
Pos	Team	Pld	W	D	L	GF	GA	GD	Pts	Qualification or relegation
1	South Hobart (C)	21	18	2	1	79	25	+54	56	2013 National Premier Leagues Finals
2	Devonport City	21	13	2	6	68	38	+30	41	2013 Tasmania Finals
3	Hobart Zebras	21	11	6	4	68	41	+27	39	2013 Tasmania Finals
4	Olympia	21	10	4	7	51	35	+16	34	2013 Tasmania Finals
5	Northern Rangers	21	7	6	8	56	39	+17	27	
6	Kingborough Lions United	21	6	5	10	40	55	−15	23	
7	Glenorchy Knights	21	4	4	13	30	56	−26	16	
8	Launceston City	21	0	1	20	14	117	−103	1	

Source: sportingpulse.com
Rules for classification: 1) points; 2) goal difference; 3) number of goals scored.
(C) Champions

==== Finals ====
Semi-finals
1	South Hobart	2
4	Olympia	0
2	Devonport City	4
3	Hobart Zebras	2

Grand final
1	South Hobart	3
2	Devonport City	1
Third place
3	Hobart Zebras	2
4	Olympia	3

== Results ==
=== ACT ===
Home \ Away	AIS	BEL	CAN	CAC	CAO	COO	MON	TUG	WOD	AIS	BEL	CAN	CAC	CAO	COO	MON	TUG	WOD
Australian Institute of Sport		3–3	1–3	3–0	0–0	4–0	3–1	3–0	0–3									
Belconnen United	3–0		3–1	3–2	0–1	2–0	3–2	2–0	2–1				3–1	0–0		3–0		0–2
Canberra	4–1	2–0		4–0	1–0	0–1	9–0	8–1	9–0		3–4			2–1				0–2
Canberra City	2–2	2–4	0–4		2–5	1–2	1–4	2–3	2–0			0–6			1–4		4–2	2–3
Canberra Olympic	2–1	3–1	1–0	2–1		4–3	0–0	3–2	1–2				2–1		5–0		1–0	2–2
Cooma	1–2	2–1	2–7	1–0	2–1		2–3	3–1	5–4		0–1							3–7
Monaro Panthers	1–2	4–1	2–5	0–8	1–8	0–5		4–2	2–0			0–2	2–5	0–1	3–2		2–0	
Tuggeranong United	1–2	1–3	0–7	1–2	3–3	1–5	1–0		1–3		2–3	0–3			2–2			
Woden Valley	2–1	1–2	4–1	1–2	1–1	1–0	4–1	2–1								9–0	6–3	

Source: sportingpulse.com
Legend: Blue = home team win; Yellow = draw; Red = away team win.

=== NSW ===
Home \ Away	API	BLC	BLS	BWE	CCM	MAN	MAR	ROC	SCW	SUT	SYO	SYU
APIA Leichhardt Tigers		3–3	0–2	1–3	1–1	1–1	0–1	1–3	1–1	1–1	0–2	1–5
Blacktown City	2–1		1–0	4–1	3–5	0–0	3–0	0–1	2–2	3–4	3–0	3–1
Blacktown Spartans	1–1	3–3		2–1	4–0	1–1	2–1	1–2	3–1	0–1	4–2	1–3
Bonnyrigg White Eagles	4–2	1–1	3–0		5–1	2–2	0–1	1–1	1–0	3–2	2–0	2–0
Central Coast Mariners Academy	1–3	0–3	2–1	3–4		2–2	0–1	1–6	4–3	2–5	0–1	2–4
Manly United	2–2	0–3	1–0	0–1	1–2		0–2	1–3	4–2	1–2	3–1	3–0
Marconi Stallions	2–1	2–2	1–0	0–2	4–1	0–3		1–0	3–1	1–2	0–0	3–0
Rockdale City Suns	1–0	0–2	1–0	0–0	3–0	4–2	0–0		0–1	2–0	0–0	2–3
South Coast Wolves	4–4	1–0	2–1	1–4	2–2	1–2	4–1	1–1		0–4	0–4	1–2
Sutherland Sharks	4–2	2–0	3–1	4–0	1–0	1–1	2–3	2–2	3–1		2–1	1–1
Sydney Olympic	1–2	2–1	1–1	4–0	2–1	5–0	1–1	0–4	2–0	0–0		2–3
Sydney United	3–1	4–1	0–0	2–4	3–0	0–0	2–1	3–2	4–0	2–0	1–0	

Source: sportingpulse.com
Legend: Blue = home team win; Yellow = draw; Red = away team win.

=== Queensland ===
Home \ Away	BRC	BRS	CEN	FAR	MOR	NOR	OLY	PAL	QAS	RED	SUN	WES
Brisbane City		3–5	8–1	1–1	1–0	5–0	2–6	4–2	3–0	2–0	1–6	3–2
Brisbane Strikers	2–0		8–1	5–1	7–0	0–2	2–7	3–0	1–2	2–1	3–0	3–2
Central Queensland	1–2	3–4		3–4	1–2	1–6	3–9	0–5	3–2	0–5	0–7	4–2
Far North Queensland	0–7	0–4	1–4		0–2	4–1	1–1	0–3	2–5	2–4	1–5	2–2
Moreton Bay United	1–3	2–1	5–4	2–3		3–0	1–3	3–2	3–2	1–4	2–0	1–0
Northern Fury	2–4	0–3	2–2	1–1	2–2		6–3	2–2	6–1	4–2	0–2	3–0
Olympic FC	1–3	6–2	7–0	4–2	3–1	5–3		3–1	5–2	2–1	4–1	4–5
Palm Beach	0–2	3–2	5–4	3–2	0–1	1–2	0–6		3–2	4–7	1–3	0–1
Queensland Academy of Sport	0–2	0–2	0–3	2–3	2–2	0–3	0–2	0–3		1–5	0–2	1–2
Redlands United	3–3	3–0	11–2	2–0	3–1	0–0	3–5	7–1	3–1		3–3	1–3
Sunshine Coast	0–1	2–0	9–0	4–0	1–2	2–1	2–3	4–0	1–0	1–0		2–0
Western Pride	4–2	0–4	6–2	3–0	2–2	0–2	0–1	4–2	2–2	1–4	0–4	

Source: sportingpulse.com
Legend: Blue = home team win; Yellow = draw; Red = away team win.

=== South Australia ===
Home \ Away	ABE	ACI	ACB	ACM	ARA	CAM	CRO	CUM	ENF	NOR	PAR	WES	WTB	WHI
Adelaide Blue Eagles		3–3	0–1	4–3	0–0	1–0	4–1	4–3	3–0	0–1	3–0	2–1	2–1	4–2
Adelaide City	0–1		5–0	3–0	3–1	0–1	2–1	1–3	2–0	1–2	3–1	3–2	2–1	2–1
Adelaide Cobras	0–0	0–5		2–1	1–5	1–3	0–1	1–1	2–0	0–4	2–3	3–4	0–2	1–3
Adelaide Comets	0–4	2–1	1–2		0–1	2–2	2–2	0–0	2–2	0–4	1–7	3–1	1–2	2–3
Adelaide Raiders	0–0	0–2	3–1	0–0		1–2	0–0	1–2	3–1	0–3	5–3	3–3	4–3	1–0
Campbelltown City	3–0	0–0	4–2	3–0	2–3		5–0	0–0	2–0	0–1	2–2	3–1	3–0	2–3
Croydon Kings	1–1	0–1	3–1	3–1	0–1	0–1		1–1	2–0	2–3	1–3	1–1	3–2	1–3
Cumberland United	0–4	3–2	2–0	0–4	2–1	1–3	2–0		3–0	1–0	1–0	2–2	1–1	1–3
Enfield City	0–0	0–7	1–1	1–5	2–5	0–0	3–0	0–4		0–1	1–5	0–2	1–2	0–5
North Eastern MetroStars	0–2	2–0	3–0	2–2	2–0	3–2	2–0	1–2	3–1		2–0	1–2	2–0	1–0
Para Hills Knights	1–0	0–3	2–1	3–0	3–2	2–2	2–3	0–0	2–1	0–0		0–1	1–4	1–1
Western Strikers	3–4	3–2	2–2	1–0	2–3	1–3	1–1	1–1	0–1	0–2	2–1		0–2	0–2
West Torrens Birkalla	2–1	1–1	3–0	0–1	2–0	3–1	1–1	5–1	3–2	0–1	2–1	1–2		0–2
White City	0–1	1–4	1–4	2–1	1–2	1–1	2–4	4–1	2–2	1–2	2–4	0–1	1–1	

Source: sportingpulse.com
Legend: Blue = home team win; Yellow = draw; Red = away team win.

=== Tasmania ===
Home \ Away	DEV	GLE	HOB	KIN	LAU	NOR	OLY	SOU	DEV	GLE	HOB	KIN	LAU	NOR	OLY	SOU
Devonport City		4–0	5–2	2–1	7–1	5–2	5–0	1–2			1–1	4–0	9–0			1–3
Glenorchy Knights	2–3		3–3	2–1	4–0	0–5	0–1	1–7	0–2				3–2	1–4		
Hobart Zebras	6–1	3–1		5–1	10–0	3–2	1–5	1–2		3–0			6–2		2–3	2–2
Kingborough Lions United	5–4	3–1	2–3		4–1	1–1	1–5	2–3		2–3	3–3			1–1	1–1	
Launceston City	2–3	3–3	1–3	0–4		0–6	0–2	0–11				0–2			1–5	0–3
Northern Rangers	1–1	2–2	4–4	1–2	5–0		3–3	1–2	3–4		1–3		7–0			2–3
Olympia	2–1	2–1	1–1	1–1	9–0	0–1		2–4	2–4	2–0				2–3		
South Hobart	3–1	3–3	1–3	6–1	9–0	2–1	3–2			1–0		7–0			2–1	

Source: sportingpulse.com
Legend: Blue = home team win; Yellow = draw; Red = away team win.

== Final Series ==
The winner of each league competition (top of the table) in the NPL (with the exception of South Australia, where their entrant was the winner of the Finals series) played each other in a final knockout tournament to decide the National Premier Leagues Champion for 2013.

The participants were matched up based on geographical proximity, as if the three Federations not participating that season (Northern NSW Football, Football Federation Victoria and Football West) were doing so. Where a team would have played a non-participating Federation that team received a bye to the next round. The series was played over three rounds using a single match home or away knock-out format.

Club	Qualified From	Participation
Canberra FC	(Australian Capital Territory) ACT	1st
Sydney United 58	(New South Wales) NSW	1st
Olympic FC	Queensland	1st
Campbelltown City	South Australia	1st
South Hobart	Tasmania	1st

Quarter-finals
(Victoria (state)) ~~No Participant~~
(Tasmania) South Hobart
(South Australia) Campbelltown City
(Western Australia) ~~No Participant~~
(Queensland) Olympic FC
(New South Wales) ~~No Participant~~
(New South Wales) Sydney United 58	2
(Australian Capital Territory) Canberra FC	1

Semi-finals
(Tasmania) South Hobart	3
(South Australia) Campbelltown City	1
(Queensland) Olympic FC	3
(New South Wales) Sydney United 58	4

Grand final
(Tasmania) South Hobart	0
(New South Wales) Sydney United 58	2

=== Quarter-finals ===
29 September 2013
15:00 AEST

Sydney United 58 (New South Wales)	2–1	(Australian Capital Territory) Canberra FC
Pavlović 4'; Bilic 65'	Report	Spaleta 20'

Sydney United Sports Centre, Edensor Park
Referee: Stephen Lucas

Notes:

- Byes to Campbelltown City, Olympic and South Hobart.

=== Semi-finals ===
5 October 2013
18:00 AEST

Olympic FC (Queensland)	3–4	(New South Wales) Sydney United 58
Sherlock 5' (o.g.); McLean 37'; Efstathis 64'	Report	Yamayuchi 9'; Pavlović 14', 49', 70'

Queensland Sport & Athletics Centre, Nathan
Attendance: 930
Referee: Matthew Skinner

6 October 2013
12:00 AEST

South Hobart (Tasmania)	3–1	(South Australia) Campbelltown City
Templin 24'; Hunt 79'; Morton 86'	Report	Totani 88'

South Hobart Ground, South Hobart
Attendance: 600
Referee: Brenton Kopra

=== Grand final ===
13 October 2013
14:00 AEST

South Hobart (Tasmania)	0–2	(New South Wales) Sydney United 58
	Report	Trifiro 11'; Haydar 15'

KGV Park, Glenorchy
Attendance: 1,150
Referee: Chris Young

== Individual honours ==
Glen Trifiro of Sydney United 58 received the John Kosmina Medal for best player in the NPL grand final.
