= 2014 Queensland Cup season results =

The 2014 Queensland Cup season was the 19th season of the premier rugby league competition in Queensland, Australia..

== Regular season ==
All times are in AEST (UTC+10:00) on the relevant dates.

=== Round 1 ===
| Home | Score | Away | Match Information |
| Home | Score | Away | Date and Time | Venue |
|---|---|---|---|---|
| Ipswich Jets | 16 - 22 | Norths Devils | 1 March 2014, 5:00pm | North Ipswich Reserve |
| Northern Pride | 36 - 0 | Sunshine Coast Falcons | 1 March 2014, 5:30pm | Barlow Park |
| Mackay Cutters | 12 - 40 | Easts Tigers | 1 March 2014, 6:00pm | Stadium Mackay |
| Redcliffe Dolphins | 18 - 24 | Papua New Guinea Hunters | 2 March 2014, 2:00pm | Dolphin Oval |
| Burleigh Bears | 36 - 24 | Central Queensland Capras | 2 March 2014, 2:00pm | Pizzey Park |
| Wynnum Manly Seagulls | 32 - 28 | Tweed Heads Seagulls | 2 March 2014, 3:00pm | BMD Kougari Oval |
Bye: Souths Logan Magpies

Source: Intrust Super Cup 2014 Round 1 – QRL Website

=== Round 2 ===
| Home | Score | Away | Match Information |
| Home | Score | Away | Date and Time | Venue |
|---|---|---|---|---|
| Papua New Guinea Hunters | 24 - 16 | Mackay Cutters | 8 March 2014, 2:30pm | Kalabond Oval |
| Ipswich Jets | 25 - 18 | Tweed Heads Seagulls | 8 March 2014, 5:30pm | North Ipswich Reserve |
| Central Queensland Capras | 26 - 38 | Northern Pride | 8 March 2014, 6:00pm | Browne Park |
| Sunshine Coast Falcons | 14 - 38 | Souths Logan Magpies | 8 March 2014, 6:00pm | Stockland Stadium |
| Wynnum Manly Seagulls | 32 - 24 | Easts Tigers | 9 March 2014, 2:00pm | BMD Kougari Oval |
| Norths Devils | 18 - 12 | Burleigh Bears | 9 March 2014, 3:00pm | Bishop Park |
Bye: Redcliffe Dolphins

Source: Intrust Super Cup 2014 Round 2 – QRL Website

=== Round 3 ===
| Home | Score | Away | Match Information |
| Home | Score | Away | Date and Time | Venue |
|---|---|---|---|---|
| Ipswich Jets | 32 - 22 | Wynnum Manly Seagulls | 15 March 2014, 2:00pm | North Ipswich Reserve |
| Papua New Guinea Hunters | 46 - 14 | Central Queensland Capras | 15 March 2014, 2:30pm | Kalabond Oval |
| Northern Pride | 20 - 12 | Redcliffe Dolphins | 15 March 2014, 5:30pm | Barlow Park |
| Souths Logan Magpies | 28 - 26 | Burleigh Bears | 16 March 2014, 2:00pm | Davies Park |
| Tweed Heads Seagulls | 12 - 24 | Norths Devils | 16 March 2014, 2:00pm | Piggabeen Sports |
| Easts Tigers | 50 - 6 | Sunshine Coast Falcons | 16 March 2014, 2:00pm | Langlands Park |
Bye: Mackay Cutters

Source: Intrust Super Cup 2014 Round 3 – QRL Website

=== Round 4 ===
| Home | Score | Away | Match Information |
| Home | Score | Away | Date and Time | Venue |
|---|---|---|---|---|
| Papua New Guinea Hunters | 18 - 34 | Northern Pride | 22 March 2014, 2:30pm | Kalabond Oval |
| Mackay Cutters | 12 - 4 | Wynnum Manly Seagulls | 22 March 2014, 7:00pm | Stadium Mackay |
| Burleigh Bears | 36 - 28 | Ipswich Jets | 23 March 2014, 2:00pm | Pizzey Park |
| Redcliffe Dolphins | 24 - 12 | Easts Tigers | 23 March 2014, 2:00pm | Dolphin Oval |
| Souths Logan Magpies | 32 - 14 | Tweed Heads Seagulls | 23 March 2014, 2:00pm | Davies Park |
| Norths Devils | 38 - 0 | Sunshine Coast Falcons | 23 March 2014, 3:00pm | Bishop Park |
Bye: Central Queensland Capras

Source: Intrust Super Cup 2014 Round 4 – QRL Website

=== Round 5 ===
| Home | Score | Away | Match Information |
| Home | Score | Away | Date and Time | Venue |
|---|---|---|---|---|
| Central Queensland Capras | 14 - 36 | Souths Logan Magpies | 29 March 2014, 6:00pm | Browne Park |
| Tweed Heads Seagulls | 18 - 32 | Redcliffe Dolphins | 30 March 2014, 2:00pm | Piggabeen Sports |
| Norths Devils | 30 - 10 | Mackay Cutters | 30 March 2014, 2:00pm | Bishop Park |
| Easts Tigers | 20 - 20 | Papua New Guinea Hunters | 30 March 2014, 2:00pm | Langlands Park |
| Wynnum Manly Seagulls | 46 - 6 | Burleigh Bears | 30 March 2014, 3:00pm | BMD Kougari Oval |
| Ipswich Jets | 38 - 16 | Sunshine Coast Falcons | 30 March 2014, 3:00pm | North Ipswich Reserve |
Bye: Northern Pride

Source: Intrust Super Cup 2014 Round 5 – QRL Website

=== Round 6 ===
| Home | Score | Away | Match Information |
| Home | Score | Away | Date and Time | Venue |
|---|---|---|---|---|
| Northern Pride | 24 - 22 | Norths Devils | 5 April 2014, 5:00pm | Callendar Park |
| Mackay Cutters | 8 - 12 | Tweed Heads Seagulls | 5 April 2014, 6:00pm | Stadium Mackay |
| Sunshine Coast Falcons | 6 - 30 | Burleigh Bears | 5 April 2014, 6:00pm | Stockland Stadium |
| Redcliffe Dolphins | 16 - 16 | Central Queensland Capras | 6 April 2014, 2:00pm | Dolphin Oval |
| Souths Logan Magpies | 14 - 22 | Wynnum Manly Seagulls | 6 April 2014, 2:00pm | Davies Park |
| Ipswich Jets | 25 - 12 | Papua New Guinea Hunters | 6 April 2014, 2:00pm | North Ipswich Reserve |
Bye: Easts Tigers

Source: Intrust Super Cup 2014 Round 6 – QRL Website

=== Round 7 ===
| Home | Score | Away | Match Information |
| Home | Score | Away | Date and Time | Venue |
|---|---|---|---|---|
| Papua New Guinea Hunters | 36 - 26 | Tweed Heads Seagulls | 12 April 2014, 2:30pm | Kalabond Oval |
| Northern Pride | 4 - 16 | Easts Tigers | 5 July 2014, 6:00pm | Davies Park, Mareeba |
| Central Queensland Capras | 8 - 38 | Norths Devils | 12 April 2014, 6:00pm | Browne Park |
| Wynnum Manly Seagulls | 36 - 0 | Sunshine Coast Falcons | 12 April 2014, 7:00pm | BMD Kougari Oval |
| Burleigh Bears | 22 - 14 | Mackay Cutters | 13 April 2014, 2:00pm | Pizzey Park |
| Redcliffe Dolphins | 34 - 6 | Souths Logan Magpies | 13 April 2014, 2:00pm | Dolphin Oval |
Bye: Ipswich Jets

- The match between the Northern Pride and Easts Tigers was postponed due to tropical cyclone Ita

Source: Intrust Super Cup 2014 Round 7 – QRL Website

=== Round 8 ===
| Home | Score | Away | Match Information |
| Home | Score | Away | Date and Time | Venue |
|---|---|---|---|---|
| Central Queensland Capras | 26 - 18 | Wynnum Manly Seagulls | 17 April 2014, 8:00pm | Marley Browne Oval |
| Ipswich Jets | 24 - 18 | Northern Pride | 19 April 2014, 5:00pm | North Ipswich Reserve |
| Mackay Cutters | 22 - 12 | Redcliffe Dolphins | 19 April 2014, 6:00pm | Stadium Mackay |
| Sunshine Coast Falcons | 4 - 16 | Papua New Guinea Hunters | 20 April 2014, 2:00pm | Stockland Stadium |
| Easts Tigers | 48 - 20 | Burleigh Bears | 20 April 2014, 2:00pm | Langlands Park |
| Norths Devils | 10 - 26 | Souths Logan Magpies | 20 April 2014, 3:00pm | Bishop Park |
Bye: Tweed Heads Seagulls

Source: Intrust Super Cup 2014 Round 8 – QRL Website

=== Round 9 ===
| Home | Score | Away | Match Information |
| Home | Score | Away | Date and Time | Venue |
|---|---|---|---|---|
| Burleigh Bears | 26 - 22 | Papua New Guinea Hunters | 25 April 2014, 3:30pm | Pizzey Park |
| Central Queensland Capras | 28 - 34 | Mackay Cutters | 25 April 2014, 4:00pm | Browne Park |
| Wynnum Manly Seagulls | 30 - 10 | Norths Devils | 25 April 2014, 4:00pm | BMD Kougari Oval |
| Northern Pride | 24 - 22 | Souths Logan Magpies | 26 April 2014, 5:30pm | Barlow Park |
| Tweed Heads Seagulls | 23 - 14 | Easts Tigers | 27 April 2014, 2:00pm | Piggabeen Sports |
| Redcliffe Dolphins | 14 - 30 | Ipswich Jets | 27 April 2014, 2:00pm | Dolphin Oval |
Bye: Sunshine Coast Falcons

Source:Intrust Super Cup 2014 Round 9 – QRL Website

=== Round 10 - Rivalry Round ===
| Home | Score | Away | Match Information |
| Home | Score | Away | Date and Time | Venue |
|---|---|---|---|---|
| Northern Pride | 22 - 18 | Mackay Cutters | 3 May 2014, 5:30pm | Barlow Park |
| Sunshine Coast Falcons | 0 - 36 | Central Queensland Capras | 3 May 2014, 6:00pm | Stockland Stadium |
| Easts Tigers | 14 - 18 | Norths Devils | 4 May 2014, 2:00pm | Langlands Park |
| Souths Logan Magpies | 10 - 18 | Ipswich Jets | 4 May 2014, 2:00pm | Davies Park |
| Burleigh Bears | 0 - 28 | Tweed Heads Seagulls | 4 May 2014, 3:00pm | Pizzey Park |
| Wynnum Manly Seagulls | 22 - 16 | Redcliffe Dolphins | 4 May 2014, 3:00pm | BMD Kougari Oval |
Bye: Papua New Guinea Hunters

Source: Intrust Super Cup 2014 Round 10 – QRL Website

=== Round 11 ===
| Home | Score | Away | Match Information |
| Home | Score | Away | Date and Time | Venue |
|---|---|---|---|---|
| Papua New Guinea Hunters | 32 - 22 | Wynnum Manly Seagulls | 10 May 2014, 2:30pm | Kalabond Oval |
| Ipswich Jets | 36 - 14 | Central Queensland Capras | 10 May 2014, 5:00pm | North Ipswich Reserve |
| Mackay Cutters | 22 - 12 | Sunshine Coast Falcons | 10 May 2014, 6:00pm | Stadium Mackay |
| Tweed Heads Seagulls | 29 - 26 | Northern Pride | 11 May 2014, 2:00pm | Piggabeen Sports |
| Easts Tigers | 28 - 24 | Souths Logan Magpies | 11 May 2014, 2:00pm | Langlands Park |
| Redcliffe Dolphins | 36 - 22 | Norths Devils | 11 May 2014, 2:00pm | Dolphin Oval |
Bye: Burleigh Bears

Source: Intrust Super Cup 2014 Round 11 – QRL Website

=== Round 12 ===
| Home | Score | Away | Match Information |
| Home | Score | Away | Date and Time | Venue |
|---|---|---|---|---|
| Ipswich Jets | 12 - 22 | Easts Tigers | 17 May 2014, 3:00pm | North Ipswich Reserve |
| Northern Pride | 26 - 10 | Burleigh Bears | 17 May 2014, 5:30pm | Barlow Park |
| Central Queensland Capras | 12 - 42 | Tweed Heads Seagulls | 17 May 2014, 6:00pm | Browne Park |
| Redcliffe Dolphins | 34 - 14 | Sunshine Coast Falcons | 18 May 2014, 2:00pm | Dolphin Oval |
| Souths Logan Magpies | 42 - 22 | Mackay Cutters | 18 May 2014, 2:00pm | Davies Park |
| Norths Devils | 32 - 24 | Papua New Guinea Hunters | 18 May 2014, 2:00pm | Bishop Park |
Bye: Wynnum Manly Seagulls

Source: Intrust Super Cup 2014 Round 12 – QRL Website

=== Round 13 ===
| Home | Score | Away | Match Information |
| Home | Score | Away | Date and Time | Venue |
|---|---|---|---|---|
| Sunshine Coast Falcons | 10 - 38 | Easts Tigers | 24 May 2014, 4:00pm | Stockland Stadium |
| Northern Pride | 36 - 24 | Wynnum Manly Seagulls | 24 May 2014, 5:30pm | Barlow Park |
| Central Queensland Capras | 12 - 16 | Papua New Guinea Hunters | 24 May 2014, 7:00pm | Marley Brown Oval |
| Tweed Heads Seagulls | 32 - 16 | Souths Logan Magpies | 25 May 2014, 2:00pm | Piggabeen Sports |
| Mackay Cutters | 12 - 36 | Ipswich Jets | 25 May 2014, 2:00pm | Stadium Mackay |
| Burleigh Bears | 28 - 30 | Redcliffe Dolphins | 25 May 2014, 3:00pm | Pizzey Park |
Bye: Norths Devils

Source: Intrust Super Cup 2014 Round 13 – QRL Website

=== Round 14 ===
| Home | Score | Away | Match Information |
| Home | Score | Away | Date and Time | Venue |
|---|---|---|---|---|
| Papua New Guinea Hunters | 42 - 12 | Souths Logan Magpies | 31 May 2014, 2:30pm | Kalabond Oval |
| Tweed Heads Seagulls | 36 - 18 | Sunshine Coast Falcons | 1 June 2014, 2:00pm | Piggabeen Sports |
| Redcliffe Dolphins | 22 - 24 | Northern Pride | 1 June 2014, 2:00pm | Dolphin Oval |
| Burleigh Bears | 24 - 22 | Norths Devils | 1 June 2014, 2:00pm | Pizzey Park |
| Easts Tigers | 22 - 14 | Mackay Cutters | 1 June 2014, 2:00pm | Langlands Park |
| Wynnum Manly Seagulls | 26 - 20 | Ipswich Jets | 1 June 2014, 3:00pm | BMD Kougari Oval |
Bye: Central Queensland Capras

Source: Intrust Super Cup 2014 Round 14 – QRL Website

=== Round 15 ===
| Home | Score | Away | Match Information |
| Home | Score | Away | Date and Time | Venue |
|---|---|---|---|---|
| Papua New Guinea Hunters | 43 - 36 | Redcliffe Dolphins | 7 June 2014, 2:30pm | Kalabond Oval |
| Ipswich Jets | 12 - 50 | Burleigh Bears | 7 June 2014, 3:00pm | North Ipswich Reserve |
| Sunshine Coast Falcons | 14 - 15 | Northern Pride | 7 June 2014, 6:00pm | Stockland Stadium |
| Wynnum Manly Seagulls | 16 - 18 | Mackay Cutters | 7 June 2014, 6:30pm | BMD Kougari Oval |
| Central Queensland Capras | 4 - 34 | Easts Tigers | 8 June 2014, 2:00pm | Browne Park |
| Norths Devils | 16 - 30 | Tweed Heads Seagulls | 8 June 2014, 3:00pm | Bishop Park |
Bye: Souths Logan Magpies

Source: Intrust Super Cup 2014 Round 15 – QRL Website

=== Round 16 ===
| Home | Score | Away | Match Information |
| Home | Score | Away | Date and Time | Venue |
|---|---|---|---|---|
| Mackay Cutters | 20 - 4 | Papua New Guinea Hunters | 14 June 2014, 6:00pm | Stadium Mackay |
| Souths Logan Magpies | 30 - 22 | Central Queensland Capras | 14 June 2014, 7:00pm | Marley Brown Oval |
| Tweed Heads Seagulls | 32 - 28 | Ipswich Jets | 15 June 2014, 2:00pm | Piggabeen Sports |
| Burleigh Bears | 60 - 6 | Sunshine Coast Falcons | 15 June 2014, 2:00pm | Pizzey Park |
| Easts Tigers | 20 - 44 | Northern Pride | 15 June 2014, 2:00pm | Langlands Park |
| Norths Devils | 12 - 52 | Wynnum Manly Seagulls | 15 June 2014, 3:00pm | Bishop Park |
Bye: Redcliffe Dolphins

Source: Intrust Super Cup 2014 Round 16 – QRL Website

=== Round 17 ===
| Home | Score | Away | Match Information |
| Home | Score | Away | Date and Time | Venue |
|---|---|---|---|---|
| Papua New Guinea Hunters | 16 - 22 | Easts Tigers | 21 June 2014, 2:30pm | Kalabond Oval |
| Northern Pride | 42 - 4 | Central Queensland Capras | 21 June 2014, 5:30pm | Barlow Park |
| Sunshine Coast Falcons | 10 - 38 | Wynnum Manly Seagulls | 21 June 2014, 6:00pm | Stockland Stadium |
| Tweed Heads Seagulls | 16 - 16 | Burleigh Bears | 22 June 2014, 2:00pm | Piggabeen Park |
| Souths Logan Magpies | 30 - 20 | Redcliffe Dolphins | 22 June 2014, 2:00pm | Davies Park |
| Norths Devils | 10 - 36 | Ipswich Jets | 22 June 2014, 3:00pm | Bishop Park |
Bye: Mackay Cutters

Source: Intrust Super Cup 2014 Round 17 – QRL Website

=== Round 18 ===
| Home | Score | Away | Match Information |
| Home | Score | Away | Date and Time | Venue |
|---|---|---|---|---|
| Central Queensland Capras | 19 - 18 | Burleigh Bears | 28 June 2014, 4:00pm | Browne Park |
| Sunshine Coast Falcons | 2 - 10 | Ipswich Jets | 28 June 2014, 6:00pm | Stockland Stadium |
| Mackay Cutters | 28 - 4 | Norths Devils | 28 June 2014, 6:00pm | Stadium Mackay |
| Redcliffe Dolphins | 22 - 30 | Tweed Heads Seagulls | 29 June 2014, 2:00pm | Dolphin Oval |
| Northern Pride | 36 - 18 | Papua New Guinea Hunters | 29 June 2014, 2:00pm | Barlow Park |
| Wynnum Manly Seagulls | 38 - 18 | Souths Logan Magpies | 29 June 2014, 3:00pm | BMD Kougari Oval |
Bye: Easts Tigers

Source: Intrust Super Cup 2014 Round 18 – QRL Website

=== Round 19 ===
| Home | Score | Away | Match Information |
| Home | Score | Away | Date and Time | Venue |
|---|---|---|---|---|
| Ipswich Jets | 40 - 42 | Souths Logan Magpies | 12 July 2014, 3:00pm | North Ipswich Reserve |
| Sunshine Coast Falcons | 26 - 24 | Redcliffe Dolphins | 12 July 2014, 4:00pm | Sunshine Coast Stadium |
| Mackay Cutters | 20 - 28 | Burleigh Bears | 12 July 2014, 6:00pm | Stadium Mackay |
| Tweed Heads Seagulls | 60 - 28 | Papua New Guinea Hunters | 13 July 2014, 2:00pm | Piggabeen Sports |
| Wynnum Manly Seagulls | 40 - 10 | Central Queensland Capras | 13 July 2014, 2:00pm | Ron Stark Oval |
| Norths Devils | 20 - 27 | Easts Tigers | 13 July 2014, 3:00pm | Bishop Park |
Bye: Northern Pride

Source: Intrust Super Cup 2014 Round 19 – QRL Website

=== Round 20 ===
| Home | Score | Away | Match Information |
| Home | Score | Away | Date and Time | Venue |
|---|---|---|---|---|
| Papua New Guinea Hunters | 25 - 24 | Sunshine Coast Falcons | 19 July 2014, 2:30pm | Kalabond Oval |
| Mackay Cutters | 24 - 22 | Souths Logan Magpies | 19 July 2014, 6:00pm | Stadium Mackay |
| Central Queensland Capras | 14 - 34 | Ipswich Jets | 19 July 2014, 6:00pm | Browne Park |
| Easts Tigers | 52 - 16 | Redcliffe Dolphins | 20 July 2014, 2:00pm | Langlands Park |
| Northern Pride | 52 - 18 | Norths Devils | 20 July 2014, 2:00pm | Barlow Park |
| Burleigh Bears | 10 - 28 | Wynnum Manly Seagulls | 20 July 2014, 2:00pm | Pizzey Park |
Bye: Tweed Heads Seagulls

Source: Intrust Super Cup 2014 Round 20 – QRL Website

=== Round 21 ===
| Home | Score | Away | Match Information |
| Home | Score | Away | Date and Time | Venue |
|---|---|---|---|---|
| Papua New Guinea Hunters | 56 - 12 | Burleigh Bears | 26 July 2014, 2:30pm | Kalabond Oval |
| Tweed Heads Seagulls | 35 - 24 | Central Queensland Capras | 27 July 2014, 2:00pm | Piggabeen Sports |
| Redcliffe Dolphins | 20 - 30 | Mackay Cutters | 27 July 2014, 2:00pm | Dolphin Oval |
| Easts Tigers | 18 - 22 | Ipswich Jets | 27 July 2014, 2:00pm | Langlands Park |
| Souths Logan Magpies | 31 - 24 | Norths Devils | 27 July 2014, 2:00pm | Davies Park |
| Wynnum Manly Seagulls | 20 - 28 | Northern Pride | 27 July 2014, 3:00pm | BMD Kougari Oval |
Bye: Sunshine Coast Falcons

Source: Intrust Super Cup 2014 Round 21 – QRL Website

=== Round 22 ===
| Home | Score | Away | Match Information |
| Home | Score | Away | Date and Time | Venue |
|---|---|---|---|---|
| Papua New Guinea Hunters | 32 - 22 | Norths Devils | 2 August 2014, 2:30pm | Kalabond Oval |
| Ipswich Jets | 62 - 10 | Mackay Cutters | 2 August 2014, 5:00pm | North Ipswich Reserve |
| Central Queensland Capras | 40 - 12 | Sunshine Coast Falcons | 2 August 2014, 7:00pm | Marley Brown Oval |
| Northern Pride | 22 - 18 | Tweed Heads Seagulls | 3 August 2014, 12:30pm | Barlow Park |
| Redcliffe Dolphins | 10 - 44 | Wynnum Manly Seagulls | 3 August 2014, 2:00pm | Dolphin Oval |
| Souths Logan Magpies | 20 - 28 | Easts Tigers | 3 August 2014, 2:00pm | Davies Park |
Bye: Burleigh Bears

Source: Intrust Super Cup 2014 Round 22 – QRL Website

=== Round 23 - Country Week ===
| Home | Score | Away | Match Information |
| Home | Score | Away | Date and Time | Venue |
|---|---|---|---|---|
| Papua New Guinea Hunters | 40 - 22 | Ipswich Jets | 9 August 2014, 2:30pm | Kalabond Oval |
| Redcliffe Dolphins | 38 - 16 | Burleigh Bears | 9 August 2014, 3:30pm | Longreach Showgrounds |
| Easts Tigers | 34 - 12 | Central Queensland Capras | 9 August 2014, 5:00pm | McIndeo Park |
| Sunshine Coast Falcons | 20 - 28 | Mackay Cutters | 9 August 2014, 6:00pm | Darryl Burke Oval |
| Souths Logan Magpies | 8 - 30 | Northern Pride | 9 August 2014, 7:00pm | Davies Park, Mareeba |
| Tweed Heads Seagulls | 4 - 32 | Wynnum Manly Seagulls | 10 August 2014, 2:00pm | TJ O'Neill Oval |
Bye: Norths Devils

Source: Intrust Super Cup 2014 Round 23 – QRL Website

=== Round 24 ===
| Home | Score | Away | Match Information |
| Home | Score | Away | Date and Time | Venue |
|---|---|---|---|---|
| Burleigh Bears | 20 - 6 | Souths Logan Magpies | 16 August 2014, 3:00pm | Pizzey Park |
| Sunshine Coast Falcons | 0 - 36 | Norths Devils | 16 August 2014, 4:00pm | Sunshine Coast Stadium |
| Mackay Cutters | 16 - 18 | Northern Pride | 16 August 2014, 6:00pm | Stadium Mackay |
| Central Queensland Capras | 10 - 42 | Redcliffe Dolphins | 16 August 2014, 6:00pm | Browne Park |
| Easts Tigers | 40 - 4 | Tweed Heads Seagulls | 17 August 2014, 2:00pm | Langlands Park |
| Wynnum Manly Seagulls | 28 - 10 | Papua New Guinea Hunters | 17 August 2014, 2:00pm | BMD Kougari Oval |
Bye: Ipswich Jets

Source: Intrust Super Cup 2014 Round 24 – QRL Website

=== Round 25 ===
| Home | Score | Away | Match Information |
| Home | Score | Away | Date and Time | Venue |
|---|---|---|---|---|
| Sunshine Coast Falcons | 4 - 26 | Tweed Heads Seagulls | 23 August 2014, 4:00pm | Sunshine Coast Stadium |
| Northern Pride | 30 - 6 | Ipswich Jets | 23 August 2014, 5:30pm | Barlow Park |
| Mackay Cutters | 40 - 20 | Central Queensland Capras | 23 August 2014, 6:00pm | Stadium Mackay |
| Souths Logan Magpies | 14 - 44 | Papua New Guinea Hunters | 24 August 2014, 2:00pm | Davies Park |
| Burleigh Bears | 14 - 30 | Easts Tigers | 24 August 2014, 2:00pm | Pizzey Park |
| Norths Devils | 48 - 14 | Redcliffe Dolphins | 24 August 2014, 3:00pm | Bishop Park |
Bye: Wynnum Manly Seagulls

Source: Intrust Super Cup 2014 Round 25 – QRL Website

=== Round 26 ===
| Home | Score | Away | Match Information |
| Home | Score | Away | Date and Time | Venue |
|---|---|---|---|---|
| Ipswich Jets | 30 - 24 | Redcliffe Dolphins | 30 August 2014, 2:30pm | North Ipswich Reserve |
| Easts Tigers | 14 - 18 | Wynnum Manly Seagulls | 31 August 2014, 2:00pm | Langlands Park |
| Tweed Heads Seagulls | 26 - 22 | Mackay Cutters | 31 August 2014, 2:00pm | Piggabeen Sports |
| Burleigh Bears | 29 - 28 | Northern Pride | 31 August 2014, 2:00pm | Pizzey Park |
| Souths Logan Magpies | 26 - 12 | Sunshine Coast Falcons | 31 August 2014, 2:00pm | Davies Park |
| Norths Devils | 56 - 6 | Central Queensland Capras | 31 August 2014, 3:00pm | Bishop Park |
Bye: Papua New Guinea Hunters

Source: Intrust Super Cup 2014 Round 26 – QRL Website
