= 2011 Queensland Cup season results =

The 2011 Queensland Cup season was the 16th season of Queensland's premier rugby league competition.

== Regular season ==
All times are in AEST (UTC+10:00) on the relevant dates.

=== Round 1 ===
Home	Score	Away	Match Information
Home	Score	Away	Date and Time	Venue
Norths Devils	6 - 16	Mackay Cutters	19 March 2011, 2:00pm	Bishop Park
Easts Tigers	16 - 16	Ipswich Jets	19 March 2011, 3:00pm	Langlands Park
Central Comets	10 - 36	Northern Pride	19 March 2011, 6:00pm	Browne Park
Burleigh Bears	32 - 10	Sunshine Coast Sea Eagles	20 March 2011, 3:00pm	Pizzey Park
Wynnum Manly Seagulls	16 - 22	Redcliffe Dolphins	20 March 2011, 3:00pm	BMD Kougari Oval
Souths Logan Magpies	12 - 26	Tweed Heads Seagulls	20 March 2011, 3:00pm	Davies Park

=== Round 2 ===
Home	Score	Away	Match Information
Home	Score	Away	Date and Time	Venue
Redcliffe Dolphins	28 - 24	Easts Tigers	26 March 2011, 2:00pm	Dolphin Oval
Souths Logan Magpies	22 - 12	Central Comets	26 March 2011, 4:00pm	Webb Oval
Burleigh Bears	20 - 20	Ipswich Jets	26 March 2011, 5:00pm	Pizzey Park
Northern Pride	29 - 6	Wynnum Manly Seagulls	26 March 2011, 5:30pm	Pride Oval
Mackay Cutters	36 - 12	Sunshine Coast Sea Eagles	27 March 2011, 2:00pm	Shark Park
Norths Devils	10 - 32	Tweed Heads Seagulls	27 March 2011, 3:00pm	Bishop Park

=== Round 3 ===
Home	Score	Away	Match Information
Home	Score	Away	Date and Time	Venue
Wynnum Manly Seagulls	24 - 44	Souths Logan Magpies	2 April 2011, 2:00pm	BMD Kougari Oval
Easts Tigers	16 - 26	Northern Pride	2 April 2011, 3:00pm	Langlands Park
Ipswich Jets	44 - 6	Sunshine Coast Sea Eagles	2 April 2011, 5:00pm	North Ipswich Reserve
Central Comets	0 - 34	Norths Devils	2 April 2011, 6:00pm	Browne Park
Redcliffe Dolphins	28 - 4	Burleigh Bears	3 April 2011, 3:00pm	Dolphin Oval
Tweed Heads Seagulls	46 - 20	Mackay Cutters	3 April 2011, 3:00pm	Piggabeen Sports

=== Round 4 ===
Home	Score	Away	Match Information
Home	Score	Away	Date and Time	Venue
Redcliffe Dolphins	56 - 12	Sunshine Coast Sea Eagles	9 April 2011, 2:00pm	Dolphin Oval
Tweed Heads Seagulls	26 - 22	Central Comets	9 April 2011, 3:30pm	Piggabeen Sports
Ipswich Jets	32 - 12	Mackay Cutters	10 April 2011, 1:30pm	North Ipswich Reserve
Burleigh Bears	6 - 30	Northern Pride	10 April 2011, 2:00pm	Pizzey Park
Norths Devils	20 - 10	Wynnum Manly Seagulls	10 April 2011, 2:30pm	Bishop Park
Souths Logan Magpies	26 - 32	Easts Tigers	10 April 2011, 3:00pm	Davies Park

=== Round 5 ===
Home	Score	Away	Match Information
Home	Score	Away	Date and Time	Venue
Wynnum Manly Seagulls	10 - 30	Tweed Heads Seagulls	16 April 2011, 2:00pm	BMD Kougari Oval
Easts Tigers	28 - 34	Norths Devils	16 April 2011, 3:00pm	Langlands Park
Northern Pride	60 - 10	Sunshine Coast Sea Eagles	16 April 2011, 5:30pm	Barlow Park
Ipswich Jets	22 - 44	Redcliffe Dolphins	16 April 2011, 6:00pm	North Ipswich Reserve
Central Comets	24 - 32	Mackay Cutters	16 April 2011, 6:00pm	Browne Park
Souths Logan Magpies	4 - 24	Burleigh Bears	17 April 2011, 3:00pm	Davies Park

=== Round 6 ===
Home	Score	Away	Match Information
Home	Score	Away	Date and Time	Venue
Ipswich Jets	12 - 12	Northern Pride	23 April 2011, 2:00pm	North Ipswich Reserve
Burleigh Bears	20 - 18	Norths Devils	30 April 2011, 2:00pm	Pizzey Park
Central Comets	13 - 12	Wynnum Manly Seagulls	30 April 2011, 6:00pm	Browne Park
Souths Logan Magpies	62 - 24	Sunshine Coast Sea Eagles	1 May 2011, 3:00pm	Davies Park
Redcliffe Dolphins	16 - 10	Mackay Cutters	1 May 2011, 3:00pm	Dolphin Oval
Tweed Heads Seagulls	18 - 12	Easts Tigers	1 May 2011, 3:30pm	Piggabeen Sports

=== Round 7 ===
Home	Score	Away	Match Information
Home	Score	Away	Date and Time	Venue
Easts Tigers	22 - 26	Central Comets	7 May 2011, 2:00pm	Langlands Park
Mackay Cutters	12 - 14	Wynnum Manly Seagulls	8 May 2011, 2:00pm	Shark Park
Northern Pride	36 - 28	Redcliffe Dolphins	8 May 2011, 2:00pm	Barlow Park
Norths Devils	30 - 6	Sunshine Coast Sea Eagles	8 May 2011, 3:00pm	Bishop Park
Souths Logan Magpies	16 - 32	Ipswich Jets	8 May 2011, 3:00pm	Davies Park
Tweed Heads Seagulls	33 - 32	Burleigh Bears	8 May 2011, 3:30pm	Piggabeen Sports

=== Round 8 ===
Home	Score	Away	Match Information
Home	Score	Away	Date and Time	Venue
Burleigh Bears	34 - 22	Central Comets	14 May 2011, 2:00pm	Pizzey Park
Wynnum Manly Seagulls	36 - 6	Easts Tigers	15 May 2011, 3:00pm	BMD Kougari Oval
Sunshine Coast Sea Eagles	10 - 44	Tweed Heads Seagulls	15 May 2011, 3:00pm	Sunshine Coast Stadium
Norths Devils	30 - 46	Ipswich Jets	15 May 2011, 3:00pm	Bishop Park
Redcliffe Dolphins	18 - 25	Souths Logan Magpies	15 May 2011, 3:00pm	Dolphin Oval
Mackay Cutters	22 - 18	Northern Pride	15 May 2011, 3:00pm	Shark Park

=== Round 9 ===
Home	Score	Away	Match Information
Home	Score	Away	Date and Time	Venue
Norths Devils	12 - 32	Redcliffe Dolphins	21 May 2011, 2:00pm	Bishop Park
Easts Tigers	18 - 6	Mackay Cutters	21 May 2011, 4:00pm	Langlands Park
Northern Pride	36 - 6	Souths Logan Magpies	21 May 2011, 5:30pm	Barlow Park
Central Comets	34 - 16	Sunshine Coast Sea Eagles	21 May 2011, 6:00pm	Browne Park
Wynnum Manly Seagulls	26 - 4	Burleigh Bears	22 May 2011, 3:00pm	BMD Kougari Oval
Tweed Heads Seagulls	18 - 8	Ipswich Jets	22 May 2011, 3:00pm	Piggabeen Sports

=== Round 10 ===
Home	Score	Away	Match Information
Home	Score	Away	Date and Time	Venue
Redcliffe Dolphins	12 - 22	Tweed Heads Seagulls	28 May 2011, 2:00pm	Dolphin Oval
Ipswich Jets	40 - 12	Central Comets	28 May 2011, 5:00pm	North Ipswich Reserve
Northern Pride	24 - 18	Norths Devils	28 May 2011, 5:30pm	Barlow Park
Souths Logan Magpies	26 - 10	Mackay Cutters	29 May 2011, 2:30pm	Davies Park
Burleigh Bears	32 - 0	Easts Tigers	29 May 2011, 3:00pm	Pizzey Park
Sunshine Coast Sea Eagles	14 - 32	Wynnum Manly Seagulls	29 May 2011, 3:00pm	Sunshine Coast Stadium

=== Round 11 ===
Home	Score	Away	Match Information
Home	Score	Away	Date and Time	Venue
Tweed Heads Seagulls	26 - 12	Northern Pride	4 June 2011, 2:00pm	Piggabeen Sports
Sunshine Coast Sea Eagles	28 - 38	Easts Tigers	4 June 2011, 2:00pm	Sunshine Coast Stadium
Central Comets	18 - 44	Redcliffe Dolphins	4 June 2011, 6:00pm	Browne Park
Mackay Cutters	6 - 7	Burleigh Bears	5 June 2011, 2:00pm	Shark Park
Wynnum Manly Seagulls	12 - 12	Ipswich Jets	5 June 2011, 3:00pm	BMD Kougari Oval
Norths Devils	0 - 40	Souths Logan Magpies	5 June 2011, 3:00pm	Bishop Park

=== Round 12 ===
Home	Score	Away	Match Information
Home	Score	Away	Date and Time	Venue
Northern Pride	22 - 30	Central Comets	10 June 2011, 7:00pm	Barlow Park
Sunshine Coast Sea Eagles	6 - 24	Burleigh Bears	10 June 2011, 7:30pm	Sunshine Coast Stadium
Ipswich Jets	22 - 24	Easts Tigers	11 June 2011, 2:00pm	North Ipswich Reserve
Mackay Cutters	26 - 6	Norths Devils	12 June 2011, 2:00pm	Shark Park
Redcliffe Dolphins	19 - 18	Wynnum Manly Seagulls	12 June 2011, 3:00pm	Dolphin Oval
Tweed Heads Seagulls	17 - 10	Souths Logan Magpies	12 June 2011, 3:00pm	Piggabeen Sports

=== Round 13 ===
Home	Score	Away	Match Information
Home	Score	Away	Date and Time	Venue
Ipswich Jets	40 - 4	Burleigh Bears	17 June 2011, 7:30pm	North Ipswich Reserve
Wynnum Manly Seagulls	30 - 28	Northern Pride	18 June 2011, 2:00pm	BMD Kougari Oval
Easts Tigers	8 - 14	Redcliffe Dolphins	18 June 2011, 3:00pm	Langlands Park
Central Comets	10 - 12	Souths Logan Magpies	18 June 2011, 6:00pm	Browne Park
Sunshine Coast Sea Eagles	22 - 24	Mackay Cutters	18 June 2011, 6:30pm	Sunshine Coast Stadium
Tweed Heads Seagulls	38 - 12	Norths Devils	19 June 2011, 3:00pm	Piggabeen Sports

=== Round 14 ===
Home	Score	Away	Match Information
Home	Score	Away	Date and Time	Venue
Burleigh Bears	22 - 30	Redcliffe Dolphins	25 June 2011, 2:00pm	Pizzey Park
Sunshine Coast Sea Eagles	22 - 12	Ipswich Jets	25 June 2011, 2:00pm	Sunshine Coast Stadium
Northern Pride	32 - 16	Easts Tigers	25 June 2011, 5:30pm	Barlow Park
Mackay Cutters	10 - 10	Tweed Heads Seagulls	26 June 2011, 2:00pm	Shark Park
Norths Devils	34 - 40	Central Comets	26 June 2011, 2:30pm	Bishop Park
Souths Logan Magpies	22 - 18	Wynnum Manly Seagulls	26 June 2011, 3:00pm	Davies Park

=== Round 15 ===
Home	Score	Away	Match Information
Home	Score	Away	Date and Time	Venue
Northern Pride	25 - 25	Burleigh Bears	8 July 2011, 7:00pm	Barlow Park
Sunshine Coast Sea Eagles	6 - 10	Redcliffe Dolphins	9 July 2011, 2:00pm	Sunshine Coast Stadium
Easts Tigers	14 - 24	Souths Logan Magpies	9 July 2011, 3:00pm	Langlands Park
Central Comets	20 - 34	Tweed Heads Seagulls	9 July 2011, 7:30pm	Browne Park
Mackay Cutters	10 - 56	Ipswich Jets	10 July 2011, 2:00pm	Shark Park
Wynnum Manly Seagulls	54 - 10	Norths Devils	10 July 2011, 3:00pm	BMD Kougari Oval

=== Round 16 ===
Home	Score	Away	Match Information
Home	Score	Away	Date and Time	Venue
Sunshine Coast Sea Eagles	10 - 20	Northern Pride	15 July 2011, 7:30pm	Sunshine Coast Stadium
Burleigh Bears	6 - 30	Souths Logan Magpies	16 July 2011, 2:00pm	Pizzey Park
Mackay Cutters	24 - 12	Central Comets	17 July 2011, 2:00pm	Shark Park
Norths Devils	24 - 14	Easts Tigers	17 July 2011, 3:00pm	Bishop Park
Redcliffe Dolphins	19 - 20	Ipswich Jets	17 July 2011, 3:00pm	Dolphin Oval
Tweed Heads Seagulls	48 - 8	Wynnum Manly Seagulls	17 July 2011, 3:00pm	Piggabeen Sports

=== Round 17 ===
Home	Score	Away	Match Information
Home	Score	Away	Date and Time	Venue
Easts Tigers	14 - 32	Tweed Heads Seagulls	23 July 2011, 2:00pm	Langlands Park
Mackay Cutters	17 - 16	Redcliffe Dolphins	24 July 2011, 2:00pm	Shark Park
Norths Devils	32 - 8	Burleigh Bears	30 July 2011, 2:00pm	Bishop Park
Northern Pride	36 - 20	Ipswich Jets	30 July 2011, 5:30pm	Barlow Park
Wynnum Manly Seagulls	48 - 12	Central Comets	31 July 2011, 3:00pm	BMD Kougari Oval
Sunshine Coast Sea Eagles	18 - 28	Souths Logan Magpies	31 July 2011, 3:00pm	Sunshine Coast Stadium

=== Round 18 ===
Home	Score	Away	Match Information
Home	Score	Away	Date and Time	Venue
Wynnum Manly Seagulls	22 - 12	Mackay Cutters	6 August 2011, 2:00pm	BMD Kougari Oval
Sunshine Coast Sea Eagles	14 - 24	Norths Devils	6 August 2011, 2:00pm	Sunshine Coast Stadium
Ipswich Jets	20 - 26	Souths Logan Magpies	6 August 2011, 3:00pm	North Ipswich Reserve
Central Comets	36 - 22	Easts Tigers	6 August 2011, 6:00pm	Browne Park
Redcliffe Dolphins	0 - 14	Northern Pride	7 August 2011, 2:00pm	Dolphin Oval
Burleigh Bears	10 - 16	Tweed Heads Seagulls	7 August 2011, 3:15pm	Pizzey Park

=== Round 19 ===
Home	Score	Away	Match Information
Home	Score	Away	Date and Time	Venue
Souths Logan Magpies	16 - 16	Redcliffe Dolphins	13 August 2011, 2:00pm	Brandon Park
Easts Tigers	36 - 22	Wynnum Manly Seagulls	13 August 2011, 3:00pm	Langlands Park
Ipswich Jets	26 - 16	Norths Devils	13 August 2011, 3:00pm	North Ipswich Reserve
Northern Pride	30 - 10	Mackay Cutters	13 August 2011, 5:30pm	Barlow Park
Central Comets	22 - 20	Burleigh Bears	14 August 2011, 1:30pm	Browne Park
Tweed Heads Seagulls	31 - 20	Sunshine Coast Sea Eagles	14 August 2011, 3:00pm	Piggabeen Sports

=== Round 20 ===
Home	Score	Away	Match Information
Home	Score	Away	Date and Time	Venue
Ipswich Jets	4 - 11	Tweed Heads Seagulls	20 August 2011, 2:00pm	North Ipswich Reserve
Souths Logan Magpies	40 - 22	Northern Pride	20 August 2011, 4:00pm	Yusia Ginau Oval
Mackay Cutters	14 - 16	Easts Tigers	20 August 2011, 6:30pm	Virgin Australia Stadium
Sunshine Coast Sea Eagles	46 - 16	Central Comets	20 August 2011, 6:30pm	Sunshine Coast Stadium
Burleigh Bears	12 - 32	Wynnum Manly Seagulls	21 August 2011, 3:00pm	Pizzey Park
Redcliffe Dolphins	24 - 12	Norths Devils	21 August 2011, 3:00pm	Dolphin Oval

=== Round 21 ===
Home	Score	Away	Match Information
Home	Score	Away	Date and Time	Venue
Tweed Heads Seagulls	10 - 4	Redcliffe Dolphins	27 August 2011, 2:00pm	Piggabeen Sports
Easts Tigers	10 - 6	Burleigh Bears	27 August 2011, 3:00pm	Langlands Park
Central Comets	10 - 16	Ipswich Jets	27 August 2011, 6:00pm	Browne Park
Mackay Cutters	20 - 34	Souths Logan Magpies	27 August 2011, 6:30pm	Virgin Australia Stadium
Wynnum Manly Seagulls	28 - 16	Sunshine Coast Sea Eagles	28 August 2011, 3:00pm	BMD Kougari Oval
Norths Devils	22 - 32	Northern Pride	28 August 2011, 3:00pm	Bishop Park

=== Round 22 ===
Home	Score	Away	Match Information
Home	Score	Away	Date and Time	Venue
Northern Pride	16 - 10	Tweed Heads Seagulls	2 September 2011, 7:00pm	Barlow Park
Ipswich Jets	40 - 10	Wynnum Manly Seagulls	3 September 2011, 2:00pm	North Ipswich Reserve
Redcliffe Dolphins	38 - 24	Central Comets	3 September 2011, 2:00pm	Dolphin Oval
Easts Tigers	42 - 22	Sunshine Coast Sea Eagles	3 September 2011, 3:00pm	Langlands Park
Burleigh Bears	30 - 20	Mackay Cutters	3 September 2011, 5:30pm	Pizzey Park
Souths Logan Magpies	30 - 28	Norths Devils	4 September 2011, 3:00pm	Davies Park
