= Braedyn Crowley =

Australian professional footballer

Personal information
- Full name: Braedyn Crowley
- Date of birth: 10 October 1996 (age 30)
- Place of birth: Townsville, Australia
- Height: 1.78 m (5 ft 10 in)
- Position: Striker

Team information
- Current team: Maitland FC

Senior career*
Years	Team	Apps	(Gls)
2013	Central Queensland	15	(4)
2013–2014	Northern Fury	26	(17)
2015–2016	Newcastle Jets	9	(0)
2015	Newcastle Jets NPL	9	(5)
2016	Northcote City	19	(13)
2016–2018	Melbourne City	4	(0)
2018	Bulleen Lions	7	(0)
2018–2019	Lambton Jaffas	35	(24)
2020	Maitland FC	17	(17)
2021	Bentleigh Greens	18	(8)
2022–	Maitland FC	77	(87)
- * Club domestic league appearances and goals as of 28 February 2025

Braedyn Crowley (born 10 October 1996) is an Australian professional soccer player who plays as a striker for Maitland FC in the National Premier Leagues Northern NSW.

== Career ==
In 2014, Braedyn Crowley was ranked 7th on the list of leading goalscorers for the 2014 NPL competition, with the six players above him all playing in top five teams. Braedyn scored 17 goals for his previous club in 23 games – almost half of the total goals scored by the team for the season (38). Braedyns success on the field earned him the title after the 2014 season ended as Coach's Player of the Year by Northern Fury FC's director of coaching, Ian Ferguson, and Young Player of the Year by NPL Queensland.

=== Northcote City ===
In April 2016, Crowley joined Melbourne based National Premier Leagues Victoria side Northcote City FC. He picked the number 10 kit. Crowley made his Northcote debut on 15 April 2016, in a 3–0 Round 8 loss to Port Melbourne SC. Crowley got off the mark for City in Round 10, scoring his side's second goal in a 3–2 win over Richmond SC. The striker grabbed his third Northcote goal in Round 13 in a 3–2 loss to Oakleigh Cannons FC at John Cain Memorial Park. Crowley then stunned the NPL Victoria by scoring all five of Northcote's goals in their 5–0 win over Melbourne Knights FC in Round 16. Crowley scored a hattrick against Port Melbourne in Round 21 3–1 win, to take his tally to 10 goals in 13 games. Crowley finished the season with 13 goals in 19 games.

=== Melbourne City ===
Upon the conclusion of Northcote's NPL Victoria season, Crowley joined Melbourne City on trial. He was announced as a Melbourne City player on 6 September 2016, signing a two-year scholarship contract. Crowley was elevated to the first-team squad ahead of the 2017–18 season.

On 13 February 2018, Crowley and Melbourne City mutually terminated his contract, after four appearances for the club since joining in 2016.

On 13 February 2018, Crowley was confirmed to have signed with FC Bulleen.

=== Lambton Jaffas ===
Crowley played his first league game for Lambton Jaffas against his former side, the Newcastle Jets Youth Side, a game in which he scored. He ended his first season at Lambton with 16 games and 9 goals. The next season, he improved his numbers significantly to 19 games and 15 goals, which included a hattrick against Valentine FC.

=== Maitland FC ===
Crowley switched from Lambton Jaffas to fellow National Premier Leagues Northern NSW side Maitland FC. Crowley scored 17 goals in 17 games for Maitland, which included a hattrick against Adamstown Rosebud FC. Crowley left at the end of the season to join National Premier Leagues Victoria side Bentleigh Greens.

=== Bentleigh Greens ===
Crowley scored 8 goals in 18 games for Bentleigh Greens as they finished 3rd in the suspended 2021 National Premier Leagues Victoria season.

=== Return to Maitland FC ===
Braedyn returned to Maitland for the 2022 National Premier Leagues Northern NSW season. In the third game of the season, Crowley scored 5 goals against Adamstown Rosebud FC. Later on in the season, he scored a hattrick against Newcastle Olympic FC. Braedyn added another hattrick against Adamstown, his third for the season. Two weeks later, he added his fourth hattrick of the season, this time, against Lake Macquarie City FC. Braedyn ended up finishing the season with 22 games and 28 goals in the league, as well as winning the leagues golden boot and making the team of the year. Furthermore, Maitland won the Minor Premiership and came runners up in the Grand Final. Across all comps for Maitland in 2022, Braedyn finished with 33 goals in 25 games, his most prolific season to date.

== Career statistics ==
As of Matches Played 29th July 2024

Appearances and goals by club, season and competition
Club	Season	League			Cup		Continental		Total	
Club	Season	Division	Apps	Goals	Apps	Goals	Apps	Goals	Apps	Goals
Central Queensland	2013	National Premier Leagues Queensland	15	4	-	-	N/A		15	4
Northern Fury	2013	National Premier Leagues Queensland	2	0	-	-	N/A		2	0
Northern Fury	2014	National Premier Leagues Queensland	24	17	-	-	N/A		24	17
Northern Fury	Northern Fury Total		26	17	0	0	N/A		26	17
Newcastle Jets FC Youth	2015	National Premier Leagues Northern NSW	9	5	0	0	N/A		9	5
Newcastle Jets FC	2014/2015	A-League Men	1	0	0	0	N/A		1	0
Newcastle Jets FC	2015/2016	A-League Men	8	0	1	0	N/A		9	0
Newcastle Jets FC	Newcastle Jets Total		9	0	1	0	N/A		10	0
Northcote City FC	2016	National Premier Leagues Victoria	19	13	-	-	N/A		19	13
Melbourne City FC	2016/2017	A-League Men	1	0	0	0	N/A		1	0
Melbourne City FC	2017/2018	A-League Men	3	0	1	0	N/A		3	0
Melbourne City FC	Melbourne City FC		4	0	1	0	N/A		5	0
FC Bulleen Lions	2018	National Premier Leagues Victoria	7	0	1	-	N/A		8	0
Lambton Jaffas FC	2018	National Premier Leagues Northern NSW	16	9	-	-	N/A		16	9
Lambton Jaffas FC	2019	National Premier Leagues Northern NSW	19	15	-	-	N/A		19	15
Lambton Jaffas FC	Lambton Jaffas Total		35	24	0	0	N/A		0	0
Maitland FC	2020	National Premier Leagues Northern NSW	17	17	-	-	N/A		17	17
Bentleigh Greens SC	2021	National Premier Leagues Victoria	18	8	-	-	N/A		18	8
Maitland FC	2022	National Premier Leagues Northern NSW	22	28	3	5	N/A		25	33
Maitland FC	2023	National Premier Leagues Northern NSW	20	28	-	-	N/A		20	28
Maitland FC	2024	National Premier Leagues Northern NSW	18	14	-	-	N/A		18	14
Maitland FC	Maitland FC Total		77	87	3	5	N/A		80	92
Career total			219	158	6	5	N/A		225	163

- Braedyn Crowley at Soccerway (archived)
