= Rugby Park (disambiguation) =

Rugby Park in Kilmarnock, Scotland is the home ground of Kilmarnock F.C.

Rugby Park can also refer to a number of other stadiums in the English-speaking world:

- In Australia:
  - Rugby Park, Rockhampton, home to the Central Queensland Rugby Union and a host of Queensland Country matches in the NRC
- In New Zealand:
  - Rugby Park, Greymouth, the former name of John Sturgeon Park
  - Rugby Park Stadium in Invercargill, home to the Southland Rugby Football Union and occasionally a host of Highlanders matches in Super Rugby
  - Rugby Park is a former stadium in Hamilton that stood on the current site of Waikato Stadium
  - Rugby Park in Gisborne, home to the Poverty Bay Rugby Football Union

== See also ==
- Rugby League Park, a separate stadium also in Christchurch, and temporary home to the Crusaders of Super Rugby.
