= Northern Fury FC =

Northern Fury
- Full name: Northern Fury Football Club
- Nickname: The Fury
- Founded: 28 August 2008; 18 years ago
- Dissolved: 2018; 8 years ago
- Ground: Townsville Sports Reserve
- Capacity: 4,000 (seated); 6,500 (total)
- CEO: Consortium of Local Figures
- Director: Massimo Di Giovanni
- Coach: Paul Roncato
- League: NPL Queensland
- 2018: 13th
- Website: www.northqldfury.com.au

Northern Fury Football Club was an Australian professional soccer club based in Townsville, Queensland. The club was founded in 2008 and competed in the A-League under the name North Queensland Fury. On 1 March 2011, the club was removed from the league due to financial instability. On 3 October 2012, the club officially re-formed after it was granted a licence to participate in the National Premier League Queensland. After rebranding themselves as "North Queensland United" in 2017, the club disbanded a second time at the end of the 2018 Football Queensland season. The club played their home fixtures at Townsville Sports Reserve.

== History ==
=== Foundation ===
A bid known as Northern Thunder FC (or North Queensland Thunder FC) was considered for admission for the 2008–09 season along with Gold Coast Galaxy. The bid was publicly well progressed, with the team's badge and colours (red, white and black) released. The training facilities were to be located at the North Queensland Institute of Sport and the home ground was to play at Dairy Farmers Stadium.

The bid was tentatively accepted to join in the 2008–09 season expanding the league to ten teams. Needing to meet certain financial criteria to be granted entry into the league, the club's major financial backer pulled out of the franchise on 5 March 2008, effectively collapsing the bid. Football Federation Australia determined on 11 March 2008 that neither Thunder or Galaxy would be granted entry "in the best interests of the league," given that a nine team format was generally unfavoured and delayed expansion of the league until the 2009–10 season.

With expansion put off until the following season, by June 2008 the FFA had received ten bids for new A–League teams, two of which came from Townsville – one headed by Melbourne businesswoman Milissa Fischer and one by local businessman Don Matheson. Matheson's bid, which "rose from the ashes of the Northern Thunder bid", was granted a provisional licence by Football Federation Australia on 24 July. On 28 August 2008 the franchise was accepted into the A–League by CEO Ben Buckley with the only matter outstanding the finalisation of all legal requirements.

On 6 November 2008, the franchise named was officially revealed as North Queensland Fury FC. Their inaugural kit was revealed in April 2009, featuring dark green sleeves/socks, and a white/light green front.

It was announced on 10 December 2008, that the Fury had signed Rockhampton–born businessman Dean Hassall as their CEO. Also the club signed Scottish club, Celtic's strength and conditioning coach Alan McCall and was also joined by Football Operations Manager Nicholas Deluca.

=== Struggles and demise ===
On 7 June 2010, former Sparta Prague and one time Czech Republic national team coach František Straka was announced as the club's coach for the coming 2010–11 A-League season after agreeing to a one-year deal.

The club finished last in the 2010/11 A-League season, winning only 4 of their 30 matches. The crowd average of 4,245 was the 4th lowest in the history of the A-League behind the Gold Coast United crowd average of the same season and the two seasons of the New Zealand Knights.

A community ownership model was launched, aimed at finding 1.5 million dollars (per year, for three years), of capital investment being sought to cover half the expected losses for the next three seasons. Ben Buckley, in an open letter to Fury supporters, made it clear that the FFA would not fund continual losses.

On 1 March 2011, the club officially had its A-League licence revoked due to financial reasons. The FFA reported that the Fury had received only $300,000 of the investment required for the next season, and despite increased sponsorship revenue the club would still lose $2 to $3 million. FFA released a statement confirming earlier reports that a decision had been taken not to continue with the franchise as the financial position of the club for season 2011–2012 considered too big of a financial risk for the FFA to undertake.

=== Re-establishment and further demise ===
On 3 October 2012, the club was officially re-established after it was announced that the club would participate in the 2013 NPL Queensland Conference, with North Queensland Football forming the new board. The club made an announcement that they would keep the old North Queensland Fury logo. On 12 November 2012 the club announced former player Gareth Edds would take up the head coach role as well as field his position at the club.

On 13 September 2017, the club announced that it would be dropping the Northern Fury name and colours in favour of the name "North Queensland United" and the region's traditional football colours of blue, red and gold.

At the end of the 2018 Football Queensland season, NQ United disbanded again.

== Rivalries ==
Northern Fury had a rivalry with fellow North Queensland NPL team Far North Queensland FC (now called Cairns FC), with both teams contesting the 'Frank Farina Cup'.

== Colours and badge ==
North Queensland's colours were light and dark green and white. These were chosen to represent the lush green vegetation of the northern parts of Queensland. The badge was revealed in 2008 soon after the bid was granted entry to A-League. The light green was often referred to in the local media as "tropical green" but was particularly unpopular with many fans of the club.

2008–2011
North Queensland Fury

2013–2017
Northern Fury

2018
North Queensland United

Home; 2008–2011	Home; 2013–2017	Home; 2018

Away; 2008–2011	Away; 2013–2017	Away; 2018

The North Queensland Fury played at Dairy Farmers Stadium in the A-League and the Townsville Sports Reserve in the NPL Queensland.

== Players who earned International caps whilst at North Queensland ==
- (Australia) Shane Stefanutto
- (Australia) David Williams
- (New Zealand) Jeremy Brockie
- (Uganda) Eugene Sseppuya

== Managers ==
Name	From	To
(Scotland) Ian Ferguson	Jul 2009	Jun 2010
(Czech Republic) František Straka	Jul 2010	Mar 2011
(Australia) Gareth Edds	Nov 2012	Aug 2013
(Scotland) Ian Ferguson	Oct 2013	Feb 2017
(Australia) Paul Roncato	Feb 2017	Dec 2017

== Club captains ==
Dates	Name	Notes	Honours (as captain)
2009–2011	(Australia) Ufuk Talay	Inaugural club captain	

== Competition timeline ==
=== Placement Timeline ===
Competition	2009–10	2010–11	2012	2013	2014	2015	2016	2017	2018
A-League	7th	11th	Did Not Participate						
NPL Queensland	Did Not Participate			7th	11th	8th	12th	8th	13th
FFA Cup	Competition Not Held				Fifth Round	Sixth Round	Sixth Round	Sixth Round	Sixth Round

=== Season by Season Record ===
Season	Division (tier)	P	W	D	L	F	A	GD	Pts	Pos	Finals	Australia Cup
Season	League										Finals	Australia Cup
2009–10	A-League (1)	27	8	8	11	29	46	-17	32	7th	DNQ	N/A
2010–11	A-League (1)	30	4	7	19	28	60	-32	19	11th	DNQ	N/A
2013	NPL Queensland (2)	22	9	5	8	48	43	+5	32	7th	DNQ	N/A
2014	NPL Queensland (2)	24	6	4	14	38	50	-12	22	11th	DNQ	Fifth Round
2015	NPL Queensland (2)	22	10	1	11	42	44	-2	31	8th	DNQ	Sixth Round
2016	NPL Queensland (2)	22	0	4	18	22	73	-51	4	12th	DNQ	Sixth Round
2017	NPL Queensland (2)	22	7	4	11	36	55	-19	25	8th	DNQ	Sixth Round
2018	NPL Queensland (2)	26	6	1	19	35	71	-36	13	13th	DNQ	Sixth Round

== Honours ==
=== Minor Trophies/Honours ===
- (Australia) Queensland Nickel Cup
  - 2009/10 (NQ Fury vs Gold Coast United: {Contested Over 3 League Fixtures} NQ Fury W2/D0/L1)
- (Australia) (Northern Territory) Chief Minister's Cup

– 2009 (3–2 vs Adelaide United – Played In Darwin/NT 02/07/09)

== All time league records ==
- Record victory: 8–0 vs SWQ Thunder (H), 16 March 2014
- Record defeat: 1–8 vs Adelaide United (A), 21 January 2011
- Highest league crowd: 8,897 vs Sydney FC, 8 August 2009
- Lowest league crowd: 600 vs Olympic FC, 27 July 2013*
- Winning streak: 3 games (29 June 2013 – 13 July 2013)
- Undefeated streak: 6 games (9 June 2013 – 13 July 2013)
- Losing streak: 14 games (22 August 2015 – 4 June 2016)
- Winless streak: 23 games (22 August 2015 – present)
- Goals in a game: 4 – Gareth Edds vs Olympic FC (H), 27 July 2013 & Braedyn Crowley vs SWQ Thunder (H), 16 March 2014
- Goals in a season: 17 – Braedyn Crowley, 2014
- Most assists in a season: 13 – Reyze Kelly, 2013

Note: From 2013 onwards, the Fury played at stadiums where the capacity can only reach approximately 3,000.

=== Appearances ===
Appearances
Rank	Player	Appearances
1	(Australia) **Corey Waples**	126
2	(Australia) **Hamish Cassady**	86
3	(Australia) Caleb Hobson	65
4	(Australia) Ari Isman	56
5	(Australia) Jacob Crowley	51
6	(Australia) David Williams	49
7	(Australia) Chris Grossman	43
8	(Australia) Jake Perry	40
8	(Australia) **Benjamin Stanley**	40
8	(Australia) **George Dalton**	40
**Bold** denotes players still playing at the club. Last updated on 21 August 2016.

=== Goals ===
Appearances
Rank	Player	Goals
1	(Australia) Braedyn Crowley	17
2	(New Zealand) **Michael Eisenhut**	12
3	(Australia) Alex Read	11
3	(Australia) **Jonathon Bagley**	11
5	(Australia) Gareth Edds	10
5	(Australia) Jake Perry	10
5	(England) **Joseph Thornton**	10
8	(England) Robbie Fowler	9
9	(Australia) David Williams	8
10	(Curaçao) Dyron Daal	7
10	(Australia) Jake Navarro	7
10	(Australia) **Corey Waples**	7
**Bold** denotes players still playing at the club. Last updated on 21 August 2016.

== See also ==
- List of North Queensland Fury FC players
