= Gareth Edds =

Australian soccer player and coach

Personal information
- Full name: Gareth James Edds
- Date of birth: 3 February 1981 (age 45)
- Place of birth: Sydney, Australia
- Position: Midfielder

Youth career
- 1996–1997: AIS

Senior career*
Years	Team	Apps	(Gls)
1997–2002	Nottingham Forest	16	(1)
2002–2003	Swindon Town	14	(0)
2003–2004	Bradford City	23	(0)
2004–2008	Milton Keynes Dons	122	(10)
2008–2010	Tranmere Rovers	69	(5)
2010–2011	North Queensland Fury	26	(1)
2013	Northern Fury	14	(9)
2021–	Townsville Warriors	15	(19)

International career
- Australia U20
- Australia U23

Managerial career
- 2012–2013: Northern Fury
- * Club domestic league appearances and goals

Gareth James Edds (born 3 February 1981) is an Australian former professional footballer who played as a defender or midfielder. He was last employed as the head coach at Northern Fury in 2013.

== Club career ==
Edds started his career in 1999 with English team Nottingham Forest after going through the AIS system in Australia. At Forest he scored once against Grimsby Town in 16 league appearances. He left for Swindon Town in the summer of 2002. However, he only played one season for Swindon before moving to Bradford City, where he again stayed for just one season. He moved to the newly named Milton Keynes Dons, where he played from 2004 to 2008, making more than 100 appearances. In his time at MK Dons he scored vital goals, including his last gasp goal at the end of the 2004–05 season, which kept the Dons in League One. In May 2008, following MK Dons' promotion to League One, he was one of six players to be released by the club. Following his release, he was signed by League One side Tranmere Rovers in June 2008 on a two-year contract.

On 11 May 2010 it was announced that Edds would not be offered a new contract and on 24 June 2010 it was announced that Edds had signed a deal with A League side North Queensland Fury

== Managerial career ==
On 12 November 2012 he accepted the role of head coach of Northern Fury. Following his retirement from professional football, Edds moved into coaching in Australia. He currently serves as the head of coaching at the Edds Football Academy (EFA) in Townsville, Queensland.

== Career statistics ==
Club	Season	League			FA Cup		League Cup		Other		Total	
Club	Season	League	Apps	Goals	Apps	Goals	Apps	Goals	Apps	Goals	Apps	Goals
Nottingham Forest	1999-2000	First Division	2	0	0	0	0	0	0	0	2	0
Nottingham Forest	2000–01	First Division	13	1	1	0	0	0	0	0	14	1
Nottingham Forest	2001–02	First Division	1	0	0	0	0	0	0	0	1	0
Nottingham Forest	Total		16	1	1	0	0	0	0	0	17	1
Swindon Town	2002–03	Second Division	14	0	1	0	1	0	2	0	18	0
Bradford City	2003–04	First Division	23	0	0	0	1	0	0	0	24	0
Milton Keynes Dons	2004–05	League One	39	5	2	0	2	0	1	0	44	5
Milton Keynes Dons	2005–06	League One	41	4	4	1	1	0	3	0	49	5
Milton Keynes Dons	2006–07	League Two	37	2	3	0	3	0	0	0	43	2
Milton Keynes Dons	2007–08	League Two	7	0	1	0	2	0	1	0	11	0
Milton Keynes Dons	Total		125	11	9	1	8	0	5	0	147	12
Tranmere Rovers	2008–09	League One	34	2	4	0	0	0	2	0	40	2
Tranmere Rovers	2009–10	League One	35	3	4	0	2	1	1	0	42	4
Tranmere Rovers	Total		69	5	8	0	2	1	3	0	82	6
Northern Fury	2010–11	A-League	26	1	—		—		—		26	1
Northern Fury	2013	NPL Queensland	14	9	—		—		—		14	9
Northern Fury	Total		40	10	0	0	0	0	0	0	40	10
Career total			287	27	19	1	12	1	10	0	328	29

== Honours ==
Milton Keynes Dons

- Football League Trophy: 2008
