= Goodwin Park =

Multi-sport venue in Yeronga, Queensland

- The Home of Football
- Interactive map of Goodwin Park
- Location: 50 Cansdale Street, Yeronga
- Coordinates: 27°30′31″S 153°0′50″E
- Owner: The Australian Hellenic Sports and Cultural Committee
- Operator: Olympic FC
- Capacity: 2,200
- Surface: Grass

Tenant
- Olympic FC

Goodwin Park is a multi-sport venue located in Yeronga, Brisbane, Australia. It is home to Olympic FC. It has a capacity of 2,200 people.

== History ==
During the 2010–11 Queensland floods, Goodwin Park was submerged with the playing field virtually being destroyed. The Queensland Government handed out payments to sporting clubs that were affected by the floods, with Olympic FC receiving money to help rebuild the playing field and dressing rooms.
