= Rugby Park, Rockhampton =

Sports venue in Queensland, Australia

Rugby Park
- Interactive map of Rugby Park
- Location: 34 Normanby St, The Range, Rockhampton, Queensland
- Coordinates: 23°24′23″S 150°29′43″E
- Owner: Central Queensland Rugby Union
- Capacity: 5,000

Tenant
- Queensland Country (NRC) (2015–present)

Rugby Park is a sports venue located in the suburb of The Range in Rockhampton, Queensland, Australia. The venue is owned by the Rockhampton Grammar School and Rockhampton Regional Council. The clubhouse was redeveloped in 2013. The main ground has lighting and a capacity of approximately 5,000 spectators.

Rugby Park has hosted matches played by international rugby union teams including France and Fiji. The ground is one of the homes of the Queensland Country rugby team. As well being used for local rugby matches, it was also the home ground of Central Queensland FC in the National Premier League Queensland competition.
