= Antonio Murray =

English footballer (born 1984)

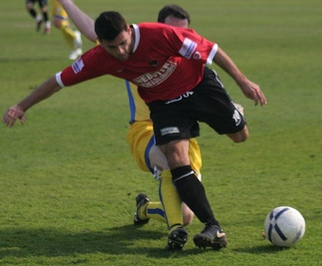

Personal information
- Full name: Antonio James Murray
- Date of birth: 15 September 1984 (age 42)
- Place of birth: Cambridge, England
- Position: Striker

Youth career
- Chelsea

Senior career*
Years	Team	Apps	(Gls)
2003–2005	Ipswich Town	1	(0)
2005–2006	Hibernian	13	(0)
2006–2009	Histon	89	(33)
2009–2010	Chelmsford City	14	(3)
2010	Cambridge United	12	(1)
2010–2011	Histon	16	(7)
2011–2016	Brisbane City	90	(81)
2017–2018	Mitchelton FC	23	(13)
2019–2020	Grange Thistle	16	(3)
2021	Wynnum District	3	(0)
2021	Rochedale Rovers	5	(0)
- * Club domestic league appearances and goals as of 11 November 2021

Antonio James Murray (born 15 September 1984) is an English professional footballer who plays in Australia for Wynnum Wolves. He formerly played for Ipswich Town and Hibernian, amongst others.

== Club career ==
As a youngster he played for the Chelsea youth team while studying at school before moving to Ipswich Town as a trainee. His league debut for Ipswich came on 4 May 2003 when he was a late substitute for Tommy Miller in Ipswich's 4–1 away to Derby County. He signed a new two-year deal with Ipswich in July 2003.

He left Ipswich to join Hibernian on a free transfer in January 2005 to replace the departing Craig Rocastle. He was initially on a six-month contract, but in March 2005 signed a new two-and-a-half-year deal with Hibs. His spell with Hibs was disrupted by injury, and he made only 13 appearances before being released at the end of the 2005–06 season.

In July 2006 he was on trial with Wycombe Wanderers, but he signed for Conference South side Histon in August 2006. He had trouble breaking into the first team at Histon in the opening months of the 2006–07 season, but later went on a scoring spree of scoring seven goals in nine games to help Histon to the top of the league, and into Steve Fallon's starting eleven. Histon were promoted to the Conference National at the end of that season for the first time in their history.

It was confirmed in May 2009 that Murray was being released by Histon on their official homepage, to make him a free-agent. In August 2009, Murray joined Conference South outfit Chelmsford City. Murray signed for Cambridge United on 1 February 2010, for the remainder of the season, but after failing to impress, including a red card on his debut, he was released by manager Martin Ling at the end of the season. He then re-signed for former club Histon before moving to Australia to trial for the Queensland A-League club, Brisbane Roar in 2011. Undone by a groin injury, Murray signed for current National Premier Leagues Queensland club, Brisbane City FC. In 2013, he scored 27 goals from 21 games earning him the golden boot award for highest goal scorer in the league.

== International career ==
Born in England, Murray is also eligible to play for Scotland through his Scottish father, Jamie, who played professionally for Cambridge United, Sunderland and Brentford, or for Italy, through his Italian mother. He was called up to the England C squad for an International Challenge Cup game against Italy on 12 November 2008.
