= Arthur & Allan Morris Field =

Soccer stadium in Brisbane, Australia

Coordinates: 27°32′04.00″S 153°15′42.50″E

Compass Grounds
- Interactive map of Compass Grounds
- Location: Cleveland
- Capacity: 1,000
- Surface: Grass

Tenant
- Redlands United (1980–present) Brisbane Roar U20 (2015–2016)

The Arthur & Allan Morris Field (also known by its sponsored name Compass Grounds) is the home ground for the Redlands City Devils (QLDSL) and Redlands United. The ground is situated at the Redland Showgrounds in Cleveland, Queensland. It has been voted one of the best fields in Queensland, Australia.
