= North Ipswich Reserve =

Sports venue in Queensland, Australia

- Interactive map of North Ipswich Reserve
- Former names: QLD Group Oval; Jets Oval; Bendigo Bank Oval; North Ipswich Oval; North Ipswich Cricket Reserve
- Location: Ipswich, Queensland
- Coordinates: 27°36′39″S 152°45′53″E
- Owner: Ipswich Jets
- Capacity: 5,500
- Surface: Grass

Construction
- Renovated: 2002

Tenants
- Ipswich Jets (Queensland Wizard Cup); Western Pride (2013-2014)

North Ipswich Reserve, also known as Qld Group Stadium or commercially as Bendigo Bank Oval, is a sports venue in Ipswich, Queensland. Originally an Australian rules football (and later cricket) oval, it became a primarily rugby league venue in the 1920s as that code experienced an explosion in local popularity. It is currently home to the Ipswich Jets, who play in the Queensland Cup. On occasion, the venue plays host to National Rugby League trial matches, most recently when the Sydney Roosters played the Jets.

In 2010, Brisbane Roar played an Ipswich invitation side made up of players from Ipswich Knights, Western Spirit FC, and Ipswich City FC. Brisbane Roar also played Melbourne Victory in a pre-season game in 2013.

A $20 million redevelopment into a rectangular stadium configuration with capacity for over 20,500+ is currently proposed as part of an Ipswich City Council bid for bringing National Rugby League and A-League matches to the city and as part of the Western Corridor NRL bid (Jets).

== Past Sports Events ==
=== Australian rules football ===
In Australian rules football, the earliest recorded match at what was known as the North Ipswich Reserve was between Ipswich Grammar School and the newly formed Ipswich Football Club in 1870. The ground would serve as the Ipswich Football Club's home ground from 1870 through periods of dormancy in the 1890s and 1900s (appearing as a representative side for the city). The Queensland Football Association (1880-1890) made regular use of the ground for matches, particularly intercolonials. A reformed Ipswich club also participated in the early years of the Queensland Australian Football League competition from 1905, using the oval as its base. The club would discontinue using the oval and later switch to soccer around 1949. It was home to the Queensland Australian rules football team for interstate tests against the New South Wales Australian rules football team in the 1890s, 1900s, and 1920s. Many other prominent Australian rules matches were played there until the code's centre of popularity began to gradually shift from Ipswich to Brisbane in the 20th century.

=== Rugby Union ===
The first recorded Rugby Union match at the ground was in 1878, upon insistence of the Brisbane Football Club, which had switched to the code. Rugby was played sporadically on the ground in the years to follow, including intercolonial matches in the 1880s.

=== Cricket ===
The ground has been used as a cricket venue since 1884. In 1885, cricket authorities assumed control over the ground, and it became known as the North Ipswich Cricket Reserve. Following the turn of the century, as it began to host a range of other sports, it was known simply as the North Ipswich Oval.

=== Association Football (soccer) ===
Soccer matches have been played there since the turn of the 20th century. Ipswich representative association football sides played the New Zealand national football team at North Ipswich Reserve in 1922, and the China national football team in 1923 It was home to the Western Pride FC from the 2013 National Premier League Queensland for 2 years. Top-level soccer returned in 2021 with an A-League Men's pre-season match.

=== Rugby League ===
Rugby league matches have been played there since 1910. In the 1980s, it became home to the Ipswich Jets, who entered the Brisbane Rugby League premiership in 1986, attracting interest and crowds to the venue. More recently, in 2003, 2008, 2011, 2012, and 2017, NRL trial matches there have averaged around 3,000 spectators a game. It has hosted the 2013 Queensland Rugby League Grand Final.
