= Central Queensland FC =

Central Queensland
- Full name: Central Queensland Football Club
- Nickname: Energy
- Founded: 2012
- Dissolved: 2014
- Ground: Rugby Park, Rockhampton
- Capacity: 5,000
- Chairman: Jason Williams
- Manager: Raymond Wood
- League: NPL Queensland
- 2013: 11th
- Website: http://www.cqfc.com.au/

Central Queensland FC was a football (soccer) club in Rockhampton, Queensland. The club was established in 2012. The club played in the National Premier League Queensland and was removed from the NPL in March 2014 after failing to meet licensing conditions.
