= Cairns FC =

Australian association football club

- Full name: Cairns Football Club
- Founded: 2012
- Dissolved: 2018
- Ground: Barlow Park
- Capacity: 18,000 (1,700 seated)
- Coach: Danny Graystone
- League: NPL Queensland
- 2018: 6th
- Website: http://www.fnqheat.com.au/
Home colours	Away colours

Cairns FC, previously known as FNQ FC Heat, was an Australian semi-professional soccer club based in the regional city of Cairns, in the far north of Queensland. Founded in 2012, the club was awarded a licence to compete in the National Premier Leagues Queensland in the 2018 season, with matches played from Barlow Park. The club reached the 2016 NPL Queensland Grand Final but relinquished their licence at the end of the 2018 due to financial issues.

== History ==
=== Centre of Excellence and FNQ Bulls ===
The club's origins are borne out of the Far North Queensland Centre of Excellence Program, an elite based program for talented FNQ Junior players U12-U18 male and female, It started late 2007 for the beginning of the 2008 season and was run by then FNQ Football Development Manager Chris Collins. These players were to feed into the Far North Queensland Bulls FC which was formed in 2009 and based at Borzi Park in Mareeba and played in the defunct QSL. A Number of former Centre of Excellence players have since moved on to the QAS (Queensland Academy of sport) and the AIS/FFA National centre of excellence, with two boys also captaining the Australian Joeys (U17's) in 2014.

In the 2010 QSL season, the club finished a very creditable 3rd in the league, behind competition heavyweights, the Sunshine Coast FC and Brisbane Strikers, but were knocked out in the first semi final by arch rivals the Townsville-based NQ Razorbacks.

The Bulls were one of two feeder teams for now defunct A-League side North Queensland Fury along with North Queensland Razorbacks. They were considered to be fierce rivals, being the only two teams playing in the North Queensland area in a semi-professional competition.

=== Entering the NPL ===
In 2012 the FFA introduced and formed the National Premiers Leagues throughout Australia as a second tier level to under pin the A-League and applications were invited to nominate for the new competition.

A new club named FNQ FC Ltd (FNQ Heat) was formed and established in 2012, and competed in the 2013 National Premier Leagues Queensland. They finished 10th out of 12 teams using a squad of young players from Far North Queensland the majority of which were products if the C.O.E development program bolstered by five senior players from the defunct FNQ Bulls giving the squad an average age of under 21.

== Rivalries ==
Far North Queensland has a rivalry with fellow North Queensland NPL team Northern Fury, with both teams contesting the Frank Farina Cup.

== Staff ==
Football Department

- Technical Director: Mark Boyd
- Senior Head Coach: Danny Greystone
- Senior Assistant Coach: William (Bill) Vale
- Senior Squad Goalkeeping Coach: John Salogni
- Team Manager: Peter Wilson
- Physiotherapist: Ryan Pengelly

Board of Directors

- Chairman:
- Deputy Chairman/Treasurer:
- Director: John Casale
- Director:
- Director: Sam Nucifora
- Director:
