= Olympic FC =

- Full name: Olympic Football Club
- Nickname: Olympic
- Founded: 1967; 59 years ago
- Ground: Goodwin Park
- Capacity: 1,500
- Chairman: Manos Saridakis
- League: NPL Queensland
- 2026: 8th of 12
- Website: olympicfc.net.au
Home colours	Away colours

Olympic Football Club is a semi-professional football club based in Brisbane, Queensland, Australia. The club was founded in 1967 and currently competes in the National Premier Leagues Queensland, with home matches played at Goodwin Park. The club has grown tremendously in the past 15 years growing from 190 registered players to over 955 players.

== History ==
Olympic FC was founded in 1967 by Greek immigrants, under the name Pan Rhodian Soccer Club, affiliated with Queensland Soccer Association. The following year the club joined the Queensland Soccer Federation, changing its name to Brisbane Olympic United as a condition of joining the federation. The club colours were originally blue and white until changing to red and white in the late 2000s. In 2008, the club again changed its name to Olympic FC upon joining the Queensland State League (QSL). After playing in the QSL in 2008 and 2009, the club elected to play in the Brisbane Premier League for the 2010 season.

The Queensland State League was ultimately superseded by the National Premier Leagues competition. In 2013, Olympic FC was awarded a licence to compete in the inaugural Queensland National Premier Leagues season, a recognition of the club's stature in the state. The NPL is Australia's second highest footballing tier.

== Club performance ==
In 1971 Olympic won the Brisbane Division 3A premiership and were promoted to Brisbane Division 2C (the 4th level of Brisbane football) for the 1972 season.

In 1972 Olympic won the Brisbane Division 2C premiership and in 1973 played in the Amateur 2 Division (the 4th level of Brisbane football).

In 1974 Olympic fielded teams in the Brisbane Third Division and Fifth Division competitions.

Olympic has won NPL Queensland competition on one occasion. In the competition's inaugural 2013 season, Olympic secured a league premiership with two rounds remaining, defeating Moreton Bay United 3–1. Olympic FC then secured a victory over Brisbane City 3–3 (3–0) on penalties in the NPL Queensland Grand Final at Goodwin Park. Since 2013, Olympic FC has continued to perform well in the competition, securing multiple top table finishes.

The club made five NPL Queensland Grand Finals in a row, unfortunately losing all of them. In 2018 Olympic lost 2–1 to Lions FC at Lions Stadium. In 2019, they lost 2-1 to Gold Coast Knights. in 2020 and 2021, they lost again to Lions FC and in 2022, the club lost against Gold Coast Knights.

Olympic FC has played in the national rounds of the Australia Cup on five occasions. The club qualified in 2014, progressing to the Round of 16 before losing narrowly to the Central Coast Mariners, an A-League, professional side. The club qualified again in 2018, but lost to local rivals Lions FC in the Round of 32. in 2019, Olympic made it to the round of 16 before losing to professional side, Adelaide United. The Club qualified for the fourth time in their history in 2024, beating APIA Leichhardt FC in the round of 32 before losing against South Melbourne in extra time. In 2015, Olympic FC qualified for a fifth time and was drawn against local rivals, Brisbane City, losing 2-0.

== Home ground ==
Olympic FC first played at Pineapple Park, a field near the Gabba Cricket Ground in Kangaroo Point. In the 1970s, Olympic moved to Dutton Park. In 1982, the club moved to the current home ground in Yeronga, Goodwin Park.

== Notable players ==
Olympic FC has developed notable players. Michael Zullo, A-League champion and Socceroo, played for Olympic FC as a boy.

Jai Ingham and Dane Ingham both spent formative years at the club before playing professionally in the A-League. Both brothers have played for New Zealand internationally, with Dane Ingham notably starting all of New Zealand's matches at the 2017 FIFA Confederations Cup, competing against Cristiano Ronaldo when playing Portugal. Dane was just 18 when making his debut, making him the second youngest player to ever play at the FIFA Confederations Cup.

Kaitlyn Torpey was also at Olympic FC at youth level before moving on to Brisbane Roar FC (women). Kaitlyn has gone on to make over 25 appearances for the Matildas and played for club teams such as San Diego Wave FC, Portland Thorns FC and Newcastle United W.F.C.

== Men's Senior Team ==
Note: Flags indicate national team as defined under FIFA eligibility rules; some limited exceptions apply. Players may hold more than one non-FIFA nationality.

No.	Pos.	Nation	Player
1	GK	AUS	Lachlan Duke
2	DF	AUS	Jackson Simpkin
3	DF	AUS	Tom Larkham
4	DF	AUS	Sam Keogan
5	DF	IRL	Jack Hudson
6	DF	AUS	Lewis Greenwood
7	DF	AUS	Ben Warland
8	MF	JPN	Fumiya Sono
9	FW	SCO	Ben Hermiston
10	MF	JPN	Kenshin Takagichi
11	FW	AUS	Ty Cobb
12	MF	AUS	Cameron Annis-Wade
14	DF	AUS	Hudson Slater

No.	Pos.	Nation	Player
15	MF	AUS	Damon Gorrel
16	FW	AUS	Brandon McMorrow
17	FW	AUS	Declan Warnes
18	DF	AUS	Matt Reid
19	FW	AUS	Luke Rantucci
20	GK	AUS	Lachlan Hunter
21	DF	AUS	Ali Ahmad
22	MF	AUS	Sam Boccuzzi
23	DF	SRI	William Thomason
24	FW	AUS	Jac Parrot
25	MF	SAM	Dauntae Mariner
28	FW	AUS	Charbel Kairouz
30	DF	AUS	Jayden Hansen

== Women's Senior Team ==
Note: Flags indicate national team as defined under FIFA eligibility rules; some limited exceptions apply. Players may hold more than one non-FIFA nationality.

No.	Pos.	Nation	Player
1	GK	AUS	Susanna Peck
2	DF	AUS	Victoria Franklin
3	DF	AUS	Kylie Vecchio
4	DF	AUS	Monica Vecchio
7	DF	CAN	Kalli Cowles
8	MF	AUS	Laine Sunderland
9	FW	AUS	Tia Appoo
10	MF	AUS	Georgia Muir
11	MF	AUS	Eve Swain
12	MF	AUS	Eva Heron
13	MF	AUS	Cleo Trevett-Lyall

No.	Pos.	Nation	Player
14	MF	JPN	Rio Oya
15	DF	AUS	Faith Stephenson
16	FW	USA	Nicole Friedman
17	DF	AUS	Kirrily Phillips
19	MF	AUS	Melanie Le Fretz
20	MF	AUS	Alicia Woods
21	GK	AUS	Georgia Martell
24	GK	AUS	Philippa Bromley
30	FW	AUS	Sarah Burtenshaw
39	MF	AUS	Isabella Anderson

== Staff ==
- Men's Head Coach: Chris Grossman
- Men's Under 23s Coach: Dane Dawson
- Women's Head Coach: Cameron Foulkes
- Women's Under 23s Coach: Tom Dixon
- Technical Director: Scott Guyett
- Business Development Manager: Andrew Catton
- Club Administrator: Kristopher Takakis
