= Barlow Park =

Multi-sports facility in Cairns, Queensland, Australia

- Interactive map of Barlow Park
- Location: Crn Scott & Severin St, Parramatta Park, Cairns, Queensland
- Coordinates: 16°55′49″S 145°46′2″E
- Capacity: 16,700 (1,700 seated)

Tenant
- Northern Pride RLFC

Barlow Park is a multi-sports facility and stadium in Parramatta Park, Cairns, Queensland, Australia.

The Park is home of the Northern Pride RLFC offices, Cairns District Rugby Union, Cairns and District Athletics Association, Australian Sports Commission Development, Oztag, and formerly Cairns FC and Far North Queensland Rugby League.

Since 2008 it has been the home ground for the Northern Pride rugby league team who play in the State Competition Queensland Cup.

== Venue ==
The ground comprises an IAAF international athletics facility, turf sports fields at the main Barlow and West Barlow parks, and a capacity of 15,000 people including a 1,700 seat grandstand with corporate and media facilities.

== History ==
The Cairns Sports Centre (Barlow Park) was officially opened on Saturday the 5th of December 1987. It was named after James Aloysius Barlow, an alderman with Cairns City Council from 1955 to 1970. It has had various upgrades, notably a $1 million grandstand extension which was officially opened on 13 August 2003. In 2024 a $10.9 million project installed LED lighting which increased the lighting capacity from 500 lux to broadcast standard 1800 lux and also installed a large video screen for scoring and replays. Further upgrades are proposed to enable the venue to be used for preliminary football matches for the 2032 Olympic games.

Prior to the development of the sporting complex, Barlow Park was a cricket ground, and in 1978 hosted a match between the West Indies and Cavaliers XI.

== Events ==
Barlow Park has hosted athletic events, rugby union, soccer, rugby league matches and music concerts, including Midnight Oil (1997), Killing Heidi (2000) and two John Farnham concerts (2003).

=== Athletics ===
The Oceania Area Championships have been held at Barlow Park in 2007, 2010, 2012 and 2015. These events attracted athletes from around the world compete, as well as international sports people such as Sir Sebastian Coe. The venue also hosted the 2018 Australian All School Athletics Championships.

=== Rugby Union ===
==== Cairns District Rugby Union ====
CDRU play matches at Barlow Park.

==== Queensland Rugby Union ====
Date	Home team	Score	Away team	Tour
15 July 1992	Queensland B	13 – 32	All Blacks	Chivas Regal Rugby Series
27 April 1994	Queensland B	12 – 23	Waikato Mooloos	

==== Super Rugby ====
There have been three Super Rugby pre-season trial games at Barlow Park.

Date	Home team	Score	Away team
29 January 2011	Queensland Reds	42 – 15	Canterbury Crusaders
11 February 2012	Queensland Reds	27 – 20	ACT Brumbies
31 January 2015	Queensland Reds	13 – 28	Melbourne Rebels

==== International Rugby Union Games ====
On 21 June 1989 Queensland B played the British Lions during their tour to Australia.

=== Soccer ===
==== National Premier Leagues Queensland ====
The FNQ FC Heat, later Cairns FC, played their National Premier Leagues Queensland home games at Barlow Park between 2012 and 2018.

==== FFA/Australia Cup ====
Four FFA/Australia Cup matches have been held at Barlow Park.

Date	Home team	Score	Away team	Attendance
27 July 2016	FNQ Heat	0 – 3	Edgeworth Eagles	1,379
1 August 2018	Cairns FC	4 – 0	Armadale SC	971
21 August 2018	Cairns FC	1 – 2	Sydney FC	3,950
15 September 2021	Edge Hill United	0 – 2	Gold Coast Knights	1,946

==== A-League ====
Two A-League Pre-Season Challenge Cup matches have been played at Barlow Park.

Date	Home team	Score	Away team	Attendance
6 August 2005	Brisbane Roar FC	0 – 0	Sydney FC	4,500
22 September 2013	Brisbane Roar FC	4 – 1	Sydney FC	4,707

=== Rugby League ===
==== Cairns District Rugby League ====
The CDRL play their grand final at Barlow Park. Prior to the development of Barlow Park in the 1980s, CDRL and Foley Shield rugby league games were played at Parramatta Park (now the Cairns Showgrounds).

==== Queensland Cup ====
The Cairns Cyclones Rugby League Football Club played 32 home games at Barlow Park between 1996 and 2000.

Since their inception in 2008, the Northern Pride Rugby League Football Club have played their Queensland Cup home games at Barlow Park. Average crowds were around 2,300, with attendances over 4,000 for matches against the PNG Hunters.

==== NRL Pre-Season Trials ====
The North Queensland Cowboys have played more than a dozen NRL pre-season trial matches. The record attendance at the venue was set at the 2004 Cowboys v Sea Eagles trial which attracted a crowd of 20,000.

Date	Home team	Score	Away team	Attendance
28 February 2003	NQ Cowboys	24 – 30	Newcastle Knights	11,200
20 February 2004	NQ Cowboys	22 – 22	Manly Warringah Sea Eagles	19,950
25 February 2005	NQ Cowboys	18 – 30	Melbourne Storm	17,000
18 February 2006	NQ Cowboys	26 – 10	New Zealand Warriors	15,000
3 March 2007	NQ Cowboys	12 – 24	Manly Warringah Sea Eagles	12,500
23 February 2008	NQ Cowboys	22 – 30	Gold Coast Titans	
28 February 2009	NQ Cowboys	18 – 18	Penrith Panthers	12,000
20 February 2010	NQ Cowboys	6 – 28	New Zealand Warriors	10,000
26 February 2011	NQ Cowboys	22 – 24	Gold Coast Titans	
16 February 2013	NQ Cowboys	28 – 22	St. George Illawarra Dragons	12,036
21 February 2015	NQ Cowboys	30 – 10	Gold Coast Titans	
17 February 2018	NQ Cowboys	16 – 30	Wests Tigers	
22 February 2020	NQ Cowboys	18 – 16	Brisbane Broncos	
19 February 2022	NQ Cowboys	24 – 12	South Sydney Rabbitohs	7,128
12 February 2023	NQ Cowboys	22 – 22	Dolphins	8,922

==== NRL Telstra Premiership ====
Seven NRL Telstra Premiership Games have been held at Barlow Park. The first was on 16 June 2013 between South Sydney Rabbitohs and the Gold Coast Titans, which attracted a crowd of 16,118. Two other NRL Telstra Premiership matches were played in Cairns at Cazalys Stadium in 2001.

Date	Home team	Score	Away team	Attendance
16 June 2013	South Sydney Rabbitohs	30 – 24	Gold Coast Titans	16,118
3 August 2014	South Sydney Rabbitohs	50 – 10	Newcastle Knights	11,578
26 April 2015	South Sydney Rabbitohs	22 – 30	Canberra Raiders	8,713
3 July 2016	South Sydney Rabbitohs	0 – 20	NQ Cowboys	14,923
16 July 2017	South Sydney Rabbitohs	10 – 23	NQ Cowboys	11,217
1 July 2018	South Sydney Rabbitohs	21 – 20	NQ Cowboys	7,195
12 August 2023	South Sydney Rabbitohs	26 – 14	St George Illawarra Dragons	8,378

==== International Rugby League Games ====
The stadium hosted three matches in the 2017 Rugby League World Cup, including a double-header. Other international matches have been played, including the 1990 Les Chanticleers Tour, a trial match with New Zealand in 1994, and a qualifying match in the 2009 Pacific Cup.

Date	Home team	Score	Away team	Attendance
14 June 1990	QLD Country	9 – 16	France Chanticleers	5,000
23 October 1999	Cairns Aborigines	32 – 10	Papua New Guinea	5,200
17 October 2009	Cook Islands Aitu, Kuki's	22 – 20	Toa Samoa	4,261
29 October 2017	Ireland Wolfhounds	36 – 12	Italy Azzurri	9,216
29 October 2017	Mate Ma'a Tonga	50 – 4	Scotland Bravehearts	9,216
11 November 2017	Toa Samoa	14 – 12	Scotland Bravehearts	4,309
