= List of North Queensland United FC records and statistics =

North Queensland Fury FC (now called 'Northern Fury') are a semi-professional association football club who compete in the National Premier Leagues Queensland. The club is based out of Townsville, North Queensland and formerly competed professionally in the A-League. They played their home games at Dairy Farmers Stadium since their foundation in 2009 until folding from the A-League. Since then the team has played out of the smaller Murray Sporting Complex.

This list encompasses the major honours won by North Queensland Fury FC, records set by their players, managers and the club in first tier (A-League) competition. The player records section includes details of the club's leading goalscorers and those who have made most appearances in first-team competitions. It also records notable achievements by North Queensland Fury FC players. Attendance records at Dairy Farmers Stadium are also included in the list.

== Honours ==
=== Domestic ===
- A-League

Premiers (0): None
Runners-Up (0): None

- A-League Finals Series

Champions (0): None
Runners-Up (0): None
Appearances (0): None

== Appearances ==
=== Individual Records ===
Correct as of 3 June 2015.

- Most appearances in all competitions: 49, (Australia) David Williams
- Most A-League appearances: 49, (Australia) David Williams
- Youngest debutant: 18 years, 316 days, (Australia) Jack Hingert v. Sydney FC – 8 August 2009.
- Oldest first team player: 33 years, 319 days, (Australia) Ufuk Talay v. Brisbane Roar – 8 February 20114.
- Most consecutive appearances: 35, (Australia) Justin Pasfield, (28 November 2009 – 2 January 2011).

=== Most appearances ===
Correct as of 3 June 2015

Ranking	Name	Nat	Position	Years	League^{[A]}	Cup^{[B]}	Asia^{[C]}	Other^{[D]}	Total
1	David Williams	(Australia)	FWD	2009–2011	49	–	–	–	49
2	Chris Grossman	(Australia)	MID	2009–2011	43	–	–	–	43
3	Justin Pasfield	(Australia)	GK	2009–2011	39	–	–	–	39
4	Dyron Daal	(Curaçao)	FWD	2009–2011	38	–	–	–	38
5	Jason Spagnuolo	(Australia)	MID	2009–2011	37	–	–	–	37
6	Ufuk Talay	(Australia)	MID	2009–2011	33	–	–	–	33
7	Mark Hughes	(England)	DEF	2010–2011	30	–	–	–	30
8	Jack Hingert	(Australia)	DEF	2009–2011	27	–	–	–	27
9	Gareth Edds	(Australia)	DEF	2010–2011	26	–	–	–	26
10	Robbie Fowler	(England)	FWD	2009–2010	26	–	–	–	26

A. ^{a} Includes finals series.

B. ^{a} FFA Cup only.

C. ^{a} AFC Champions League only.

D. ^{a,b} Other matches include OFC Club Championship Australian Qualifying Tournament (2005), Pre-Season Cup (2005–2008), FIFA Club World Cup, and the Pan-Pacific Championship (2008–2009).

== Goalscorers ==
Updated 3 June 2015.

=== Domestic ===
- Inaugural goalscorer: (Australia) Rostyn Griffiths v. Sydney FC – 8 August 2009.
- Most league goals: 9, (England) Robbie Fowler
- Most goals in a league season: 9, (England) Robbie Fowler, 2009–10 season.
- Most goals in a league match:
- Most consecutive goalscoring appearances: 3, (England) Robbie Fowler, (28 August 2009 – 15 September 2009).
- Youngest goalscorer: 19 years, 325 days, (Australia) Chris Payne v. Perth Glory – 6 August 2010.
- Oldest goalscorer: 34 years, 264 days, (Australia) Ufuk Talay v. Sydney FC – 15 December 2010.

=== Top goalscorers ===
This lists of the top scorers in competitive matches for the club. All current players are in bold. Appearances shown in brackets.
Correct as of 1 June 2015.

Ranking	Name	Nat	Position	Years	League^{[A]}	Cup^{[B]}	Asia^{[C]}	Other^{[D]}	Total
1	Robbie Fowler	(England)	FWD	2009–2010	9 (26)	–	–	–	**9** (26)
2	David Williams	(Australia)	FWD	2009–2011	8 (49)	–	–	–	**8** (49)
3	Dyron Daal	(Australia)	FWD	2009–2011	7 (38)	–	–	–	**7** (38)
4	Chris Grossman	(Australia)	DEF	2009–2011	5 (43)	–	–	–	**5** (43)
5	Chris Payne	(Australia)	FWD	2010–2011	4 (21)	–	–	–	**4** (21)
5	Mark Hughes	(England)	DEF	2010–2011	4 (30)	–	–	–	**4** (30)
7	Daniel McBreen	(Australia)	FWD	2009–2010	3 (21)	–	–	–	**3** (21)
7	Ufuk Talay	(Australia)	MID	2009–2011	3 (33)	–	–	–	**3** (33)
9	Rostyn Griffiths	(Australia)	MID	2009–2010	2 (23)	–	–	–	**2** (23)
9	Terry Cooke	(England)	MID	2009–2010	2 (10)	–	–	–	**2** (10)

A. ^{a} Include finals series.

B. ^{a} FFA Cup only.

C. ^{a} For the purposes of this table, Asia also includes the 2005 OFC Club Championship.

D. ^{a,b} Other matches include OFC Club Championship Australian Qualifying Tournament (2005), Pre-Season Cup (2005–2008), FIFA Club World Cup, and the Pan-Pacific Championship (2008–2009).

== Managerial records ==
Managers listed in order first game in charge of the team. Caretaker managers included and marked by †.
Competitive matches only. These include A-League, FFA Cup, Asian Champions League,
Correct as of 3 June 2015.

	Coach	Nat	Years	M	W	D	L	Pts	PPG
1	Ian Ferguson	(Scotland)	2009–2010	27	8	8	11	32	1.1852
2	Frantisek Straka	(Czech Republic)	2010–2011	30	4	7	19	19	0.6333

== Team records ==
All records and statistics in this section span across all competitive fixtures. 'Regular season' indicates home and away league games only, it does not include finals series (unless stated otherwise). Records for home and away do not include results in competitions that primarily used neutral venues, including OFC Champions League, A-League Pre-Season Challenge Cup, FIFA Club World Cup and Pan-Pacific Championship
Correct as of 18 May 2015.

- Biggest winning margin: 2 goals, v. Gold Coast United, 31 October 2009.
- Biggest losing margin: 7 goals, v. Adelaide United, 21 January 2011.
- Most goals scored in a match: 3, v. Adelaide United, 28 August 2009 and v. Perth Glory, 6 August 2010.
- Most goals conceded in a match: 8, v. Adelaide United, 21 January 2011.
- Most consecutive wins: 2
- Most consecutive defeats: 8
- Most consecutive games without defeat: 5
- Most consecutive games without a win: 11
- Most consecutive games without conceding: 1
- Most consecutive games without scoring: 2

== See also ==
- List of North Queensland Fury FC seasons
