= 2012–13 Bury F.C. season =

Bury F.C.
2012–13 season
- Chairman: Brian Fenton
- Manager: Kevin Blackwell
- Stadium: Gigg Lane
- League One: 22nd
- FA Cup: Second round
- League Cup: First round
- Football League Trophy: Northern quarter-final

During the 2012–13 season, Bury competed in the third tier of English football, Football League One.

== League table ==
Pos	Team	Pld	W	D	L	GF	GA	GD	Pts	Promotion, qualification or relegation
20	Colchester United	46	14	9	23	47	68	−21	51	
21	Scunthorpe United (R)	46	13	9	24	49	73	−24	48	Relegation to Football League Two
22	Bury (R)	46	9	14	23	45	73	−28	41	Relegation to Football League Two
23	Hartlepool United (R)	46	9	14	23	39	67	−28	41	Relegation to Football League Two
24	Portsmouth (R)	46	10	12	24	51	69	−18	32 (Note: On 20 April Portsmouth were deducted ten points after coming out of administration.)	Relegation to Football League Two

Updated to match(es) played on 27 April 2013. Source: BBC Sport
Rules for classification: 1) Points; 2) Goal difference; 3) Number of goals scored
(R) Relegated

== First-team squad ==
As of 1 November 2012

Note: Flags indicate national team as defined under FIFA eligibility rules; some limited exceptions apply. Players may hold more than one non-FIFA nationality.

No.	Pos.	Nation	Player
1	GK	NIR	Trevor Carson (vice-captain)
2	DF	ENG	Phil Picken
3	DF	ENG	Joe Skarz
4	MF	IRL	Shane Byrne
5	DF	ENG	Adam Lockwood
6	MF	SCO	Peter Sweeney
7	MF	ENG	David Worrall
8	MF	ENG	Steven Schumacher (captain)
9	MF	WAL	Craig Jones
10	FW	ENG	Andy Bishop
12	FW	ENG	Lenell John-Lewis
13	MF	ENG	Mark Carrington
15	FW	ENG	Lateef Elford-Alliyu
16	DF	NGA	Efe Sodje (player/coach)

No.	Pos.	Nation	Player
17	DF	ENG	Mark Hughes
19	FW	ENG	Troy Hewitt (on loan from Queens Park Rangers)
21	DF	ENG	Andrai Jones
22	MF	ESP	Marcos Navas
25	FW	NIR	David Healy
26	MF	ENG	Luke McCarthy
28	FW	ENG	Tom Hopper (on loan from Leicester City)
30	GK	ENG	Cameron Belford
31	DF	IRL	Matt Doherty (on loan from Wolverhampton Wanderers)
32	MF	ENG	Zac Thompson (on loan from Leeds United)
35	MF	ENG	Tom Soares
36	MF	SCO	Gregg Wylde (on loan from Bolton Wanderers)
37	MF	FRA	Sébastien Carole
38	DF	ENG	Ben Parker

=== Out on loan ===
Note: Flags indicate national team as defined under FIFA eligibility rules; some limited exceptions apply. Players may hold more than one non-FIFA nationality.

No.	Pos.	Nation	Player
18	MF	ENG	Max Harrop (on loan to Hinckley United)
11	MF	ENG	Marcus Marshall (on loan to Grimsby Town)

No.	Pos.	Nation	Player
14	FW	ENG	Shaun Harrad (on loan to Cheltenham Town until end of season)

== Reserve squad ==
Note: Flags indicate national team as defined under FIFA eligibility rules; some limited exceptions apply. Players may hold more than one non-FIFA nationality.

No.	Pos.	Nation	Player
20	GK	WAL	Christian Dibble
22	DF	ENG	Jordan Melia
23	DF	ENG	Dalton McLaughlin

No.	Pos.	Nation	Player
24	FW	ENG	Liam Boswell
29	FW	ENG	Tom Pratt
34	DF	ENG	Ethan Ebanks-Landell (on loan from Wolverhampton Wanderers)

== Results and fixtures ==
=== League One ===
bury 2 Fleetwood 0

=== FA Cup ===
3 November 2012 Round 1	Bury	1–0	Exeter City	Gigg Lane
15:00	Sodje 35'			Attendance: 1,821

1 December 2012 Round 2	Bury	1–1	Southend United	Gigg Lane
15:00	Doherty 33' (pen.)		Tomlin 41'	Attendance: 2,391

1 December 2012 Round 2	Bury	1–1	Southend United	Gigg Lane
15:00	Doherty 33' (pen.)		Tomlin 41'	Attendance: 2,391

11 December 2012 Round 2 Replay	Southend United	1–1 (3-2 p)	Bury	Roots Hall
	Tomlin 63'		Thompson 59'	Attendance: 3,043
	Penalties
	Eastwood (penalty scored); Clohessy (penalty scored); Hurst (penalty scored); Tomlin (penalty missed)		Schumacher (penalty scored); Doherty (penalty scored); Worrall (penalty missed); Hewitt (penalty missed); Hughes (penalty missed)

=== League Cup ===
11 August 2012 R1	Bury	1-2	Middlesbrough	Gigg Lane
15:00	Hughes 64'		Emnes 33'; Leadbitter 61'	Attendance: 2,964
