= 2011–12 Bury F.C. season =

Bury F.C.
2011–12 season
- Chairman: Brian Fenton
- Manager: Richie Barker
- Stadium: Gigg Lane
- League 1: 14th
- FA Cup: First round
- League Cup: Second round
- Football League Trophy: First round
- Top goalscorer: League: Andy Bishop (8); All: Andy Bishop (9)
- Highest home attendance: 6,970 vs. Sheffield United, 14 January 2012
- Lowest home attendance: 1,295 vs. Crewe Alexandra, 30 August 2011
- Average home league attendance: 3,552

During the 2011–12 season, Bury competed in the third tier of English football, Football League One.

== League table ==
Pos	Team	Pld	W	D	L	GF	GA	GD	Pts
12	Tranmere Rovers	46	14	14	18	49	53	−4	56
13	Hartlepool United	46	14	14	18	50	55	−5	56
14	Bury	46	15	11	20	60	79	−19	56
15	Preston North End	46	13	15	18	54	68	−14	54
16	Oldham Athletic	46	14	12	20	50	66	−16	54

Updated to match(es) played on 5 May 2012. Source: BBC Sport
Rules for classification: 1) Points; 2) Goal difference; 3) Number of goals scored

== Squad statistics ==
=== Appearances and goals ===
No.	Pos	Nat	Player	Total		League One		FA Cup		League Cup		FL Trophy	
No.	Pos	Nat	Player	Apps	Goals	Apps	Goals	Apps	Goals	Apps	Goals	Apps	Goals
1	GK	(England) ENG	Cameron Belford	27	0	23+0	0	1+0	0	2+0	0	1+0	0
2	DF	(England) ENG	Phil Picken	40	0	36+1	0	1+0	0	1+0	0	1+0	0
3	DF	(England) ENG	Joe Skarz	49	1	45+0	1	1+0	0	2+0	0	1+0	0
4	MF	(Ireland) EIR	Patrick Cregg	8	0	5+2	0	0+0	0	0+0	0	1+0	0
6	MF	(Scotland) SCO	Peter Sweeney	45	4	41+0	4	1+0	0	1+1	0	1+0	0
7	MF	(England) ENG	David Worrall	45	3	29+12	3	0+1	0	2+0	0	1+0	0
8	MF	(England) ENG	Steven Schumacher	34	6	29+3	6	1+0	0	1+0	0	0+0	0
10	FW	(England) ENG	Andy Bishop	43	9	33+7	8	1+0	0	1+0	1	1+0	0
11	MF	(England) ENG	Andy Haworth	7	0	0+6	0	0+0	0	0+0	0	1+0	0
12	FW	(England) ENG	Lenell John-Lewis	30	5	8+20	5	0+0	0	1+1	0	0+0	0
13	MF	(England) ENG	Mark Carrington	21	1	12+9	1	0+0	0	0+0	0	0+0	0
14	FW	(United States) USA	Mike Grella	10	4	8+2	4	0+0	0	0+0	0	0+0	0
16	DF	(Nigeria) NGR	Efe Sodje	43	2	40+1	2	0+0	0	2+0	0	0+0	0
17	DF	(England) ENG	Mark Hughes	27	0	21+4	0	1+0	0	1+0	0	0+0	0
21	MF	(England) ENG	Andrai Jones	14	0	9+2	0	0+0	0	2+0	0	1+0	0
25	FW	(England) ENG	Shaun Harrad	27	2	14+12	2	1+0	0	0+0	0	0+0	0
26	MF	(England) ENG	Luke McCarthy	2	0	0+0	0	0+0	0	0+1	0	0+1	0
29	MF	(England) ENG	Max Harrop	7	0	0+5	0	0+0	0	0+1	0	0+1	0
Players played for Bury this season who are no longer at the club:
15	FW	(England) ENG	Ryan Lowe	7	7	5+0	4	0+0	0	2+0	3	0+0	0
19	MF	(France) FRA	Damien Mozika	6	1	3+1	1	0+0	0	2+0	0	0+0	0
14	MF	(England) ENG	Mike Jones	27	4	24+0	3	1+0	0	2+0	1	0+0	0
Players who played for Bury on loan and returned to their parent club:
28	FW	(Wales) WAL	Ryan Doble	5	0	3+2	0	0+0	0	0+0	0	0+0	0
27	FW	(England) ENG	Kudus Oyenuga	3	0	0+1	0	0+0	0	0+1	0	1+0	0
9	FW	(England) ENG	Mark Cullen	4	0	1+3	0	0+0	0	0+0	0	0+0	0
15	MF	(England) ENG	Giles Coke	30	6	28+2	6	0+0	0	0+0	0	0+0	0
18	DF	(England) ENG	Ashley Eastham	27	2	22+3	2	1+0	0	0+0	0	1+0	0
19	MF	(England) ENG	David Amoo	28	4	19+8	4	0+1	0	0+0	0	0+0	0
23	DF	(England) ENG	Nathan Clarke	11	0	11+0	0	0+0	0	0+0	0	0+0	0
23	MF	(Ireland) EIR	Shane Byrne	15	0	10+4	0	1+0	0	0+0	0	0+0	0
28	FW	(England) ENG	Lateef Elford-Alliyu	13	2	4+9	2	0+0	0	0+0	0	0+0	0
30	GK	(Northern Ireland) NIR	Trevor Carson	17	0	17+0	0	0+0	0	0+0	0	0+0	0
32	GK	(Wales) WAL	Jonathan Bond	6	0	6+0	0	0+0	0	0+0	0	0+0	0

=== Top scorers ===
Place	Position	Nation	Number	Name	League One	FA Cup	League Cup	FL Trophy	Total
1	FW	(England)	10	Andy Bishop	8	0	1	0	9
2	FW	(England)	15	Ryan Lowe	4	0	3	0	7
3	MF	(England)	15	Giles Coke	6	0	0	0	6
=	MF	(England)	8	Steven Schumacher	6	0	0	0	6
5	MF	(England)	12	Lenell John-Lewis	5	0	0	0	5
6	MF	(Scotland)	6	Peter Sweeney	4	0	0	0	4
=	MF	(England)	19	David Amoo	4	0	0	0	4
=	FW	(United States)	14	Mike Grella	4	0	0	0	4
=	MF	(England)	14	Mike Jones	3	0	1	0	4
10	MF	(England)	7	David Worrall	3	0	0	0	3
11	DF	(England)	18	Ashley Eastham	2	0	0	0	2
=	FW	(England)	28	Lateef Elford-Alliyu	2	0	0	0	2
=	DF	(Nigeria)	16	Efe Sodje	2	0	0	0	2
=	FW	(England)	25	Shaun Harrad	2	0	0	0	2
15	MF	(France)	19	Damien Mozika	1	0	0	0	1
=	DF	(England)	3	Joe Skarz	1	0	0	0	1
=	MF	(England)	13	Mark Carrington	1	0	0	0	1
				Totals	58	0	5	0	63

=== Disciplinary record ===
Number	Nation	Position	Name	League One		FA Cup		League Cup		FL Trophy		Total	
Number	Nation	Position	Name	Yellow card	Red card	Yellow card	Red card	Yellow card	Red card	Yellow card	Red card	Yellow card	Red card
16	(Nigeria)	DF	Efe Sodje	9	0	0	0	2	0	0	0	11	0
15	(England)	MF	Giles Coke	9	1	0	0	0	0	0	0	9	1
8	(England)	MF	Steven Schumacher	6	0	1	0	0	0	0	0	7	0
6	(Scotland)	MF	Peter Sweeney	6	1	0	0	0	0	0	0	6	1
18	(England)	DF	Ashley Eastham	5	0	0	0	0	0	5	0	2	0
10	(England)	FW	Andy Bishop	5	0	0	0	0	0	0	0	5	0
23	(England)	DF	Nathan Clarke	5	0	0	0	0	0	0	0	5	0
12	(England)	FW	Lenell John-Lewis	4	1	0	0	0	0	0	0	4	1
7	(England)	MF	David Worrall	3	0	0	0	1	0	0	0	4	0
21	(England)	DF	Andrai Jones	3	1	0	0	0	0	0	0	3	1
2	(England)	DF	Phil Picken	3	0	0	0	0	0	0	0	3	0
3	(England)	DF	Joe Skarz	2	1	0	0	0	0	0	0	2	1
17	(England)	DF	Mark Hughes	2	0	0	1	0	0	0	0	2	1
4	(Republic of Ireland)	MF	Patrick Cregg	1	0	0	0	0	0	1	0	2	0
23	(Republic of Ireland)	DF	Shane Byrne	1	0	1	0	0	0	0	0	2	0
15	(England)	FW	Ryan Lowe	1	0	0	0	0	0	0	0	1	0
19	(France)	MF	Damien Mozika	0	0	0	0	1	0	0	0	1	0
19	(England)	MF	David Amoo	1	0	0	0	0	0	0	0	1	0
14	(England)	MF	Mike Jones	1	0	0	0	0	0	0	0	1	0
13	(England)	MF	Mark Carrington	1	0	0	0	0	0	0	0	1	0
			TOTALS	10	0	0	0	4	0	2	0	16	0

== Results and fixtures ==
=== Pre-season friendlies ===
9 July 2011	Radcliffe Borough	1–5	Bury	Stainton Park
15:00	Jones 64'		Lowe 7', 28'; John-Lewis 56', 66'; Worrall 69'

12 July 2011	Bury	0–3	Burnley	Gigg Lane
19:45			Austin 7'; MacDonald 37'; Iwelumo 83'

15 July 2011	Bury	1–4	Everton	Gigg Lane
19:45	Schumacher 59'		Yakubu 18'; Gueye 32', 44'; Osman 42'	Attendance: 3,017

23 July 2011	Bury	1–0	FC United of Manchester	Gigg Lane
15:00	Jones 34'			Attendance: 1372

27 July 2011	Bury	0–2	Bolton Wanderers	Gigg Lane
19:45			Klasnić 43'; Cahill 61'	Attendance: 2,997

30 July 2011	Prestatyn Town	1–8	Bury	Bastion Road
15:00	Gibson 75'		Hayes 17' (o.g.); Cullen 18'; Lowe 22'; Haworth 51'; Bishop 53', 89'; M. Jones 61'; McCarthy 87'

=== League One ===
6 August 2011 1	Huddersfield Town	1–1	Bury	Galpharm Stadium
15:00	Roberts 65'		Lowe 76'	Attendance: 13,873

13 August 2011 2	Bury	0–2	Carlisle United	Gigg Lane
15:00			Berrett 68'; Noble 90+3'	Attendance: 3,640

16 August 2011 3	Bury	2–1	Sheffield Wednesday	Gigg Lane
19:45	Lowe 7'; Mozika 41'		Sedgwick 47'	Attendance: 5,219

20 August 2011 4	Wycombe Wanderers	0–2	Bury	Adams Park
15:00			M. Jones 24'; Lowe 65'	Attendance: 3,259

27 August 2011 5	Bury	1–2	Charlton Athletic	Gigg Lane
15:00	Lowe 40'		Hayes 49'; Jackson 64'	Attendance: 3,084

3 September 2011 6	Sheffield United	4–0	Bury	Bramall Lane
15:00	Porter 43'; Mendez-Laing 47'; Lowton 71'; Tønne 84'			Attendance: 17,956

10 September 2011 7	Bury	2–4	Rochdale	Gigg Lane
15:00	M. Jones 21'; Bishop 63'		Grimes 5'; Holness 10'; Adams 18'; Ball 47'	Attendance: 4,897

13 September 2011 8	Chesterfield	1–0	Bury	B2net Stadium
19:45	Clarke 66'			Attendance: 5,727

17 September 2011 9	Hartlepool United	3–0	Bury	Victoria Park
15:00	Solano 33'; Nish 51', 74'			Attendance: 5,343

24 September 2011 10	Bury	0–0	MK Dons	Gigg Lane
15:00				Attendance: 2,378

1 October 2011 11	Yeovil Town	1–3	Bury	Huish Park
15:00	Agard 17'		Coke 43'; Amoo 67'; Sweeney 85'	Attendance: 3,127

8 October 2011 12	Bury	2–0	Exeter City	Gigg Lane
15:00	Bishop 14'; Oakley 48' (OG)			Attendance: 2,672

15 October 2011 13	Leyton Orient	1–0	Bury	Matchroom Stadium
15:00	Cox 45+1'			Attendance: 3,943

22 October 2011 14	AFC Bournemouth	1–2	Bury	Dean Court
15:00	Pugh 41'		Coke 45'; Bishop 53'	Attendance: 6,122

25 October 2011 15	Bury	2–2	Notts County	Gigg Lane
19:45	Bishop 5'; Coke 55' (pen)		Hughes 37' (pen.), 80' (pen.)	Attendance: 2,917

29 October 2011 16	Bury	1–2	Stevenage	Gigg Lane
15:00	Bishop 78' (pen.)		Harrison 38'; Roberts 75'	Attendance: 2,638

5 November 2011 17	Oldham Athletic	0–2	Bury	Boundary Park
15:00			Bishop 22', 30'	Attendance: 5,149

19 November 2011 18	Walsall	2–4	Bury	Bescot Stadium
15:00	Macken 28' (pen.); Bowerman 90+3'		Sweeney 6'; Jones 46'; Schumacher 63'; John-Lewis 87'	Attendance: 4,785

26 November 2011 19	Bury	1–0	Preston North End	Gigg Lane
15:00	Amoo 15'			Attendance: 4,957

10 December 2011 20	Colchester United	4–1	Bury	Colchester Community Stadium
15:00	Duguid 2', 31'; Henderson 19'; James 66'		John-Lewis 90'	Attendance: 3,156

17 December 2011 21	Bury	1–1	Brentford	Gigg Lane
15:00	John-Lewis 85'		Alexander 61' (pen.)	Attendance: 4,008

26 December 2011 22	Scunthorpe United	1–3	Bury	Glanford Park
15:00	Duffy 5'		Sweeney 50'; Bishop 69'; Sodje 82'	Attendance: 4,569

30 December 2011 23	Tranmere Rovers	2–0	Bury	Prenton Park
19:45	Labadie 24'; Taylor 90'			Attendance: 5,253

2 January 2012 24	Bury	2–1	Walsall	Gigg Lane
15:00	Sadler 20' (o.g.); Sweeney 40'		Paterson 39'	Attendance: 3,095

14 January 2012 25	Bury	0–3	Sheffield United	Gigg Lane
15:00			Creswell 54'; Evans 62'; Williamson 81'	Attendance: 6,970

21 January 2012 26	Bury	3–2	Yeovil Town	Gigg Lane
15:00	Schumacher 8', 35'; Skarz 21'		Dickson 10'; MacLean 87'	Attendance: 2,572

28 January 2012 27	Rochdale	3–0	Bury	Spotland Stadium
15:00	Akpa Akpro 15'; Grimes 41', 55'			Attendance: 5,033

31 January 2012 28	Charlton Athletic	1–1	Bury	The Valley
19:45	Stephens 90+3'		John-Lewis 42'	Attendance: 13,264

11 February 2012 -	Milton Keynes Dons	P–P	Bury	Stadium mk
15:00

14 February 2012 29	Bury	1–1	Chesterfield	Gigg Lane
19:45	Schumacher 88'		Ajose 41'	Attendance: 2,266

18 February 2012 30	Exeter City	3–2	Bury	St James Park
15:00	Archibald-Henville 5'; Nardiello 9'; Logan 41'		Amoo 29'; Eastham 90+2'	Attendance: 4,281

21 February 2012 31	Milton Keynes Dons	2–1	Bury	Stadium mk
19:45	Bowditch 20', 45+3'		Amoo 10'	Attendance: 6,405

25 February 2012 32	Bury	1–1	Leyton Orient	Gigg Lane
15:00	Elford-Alliyu 68'		Spring 27'	Attendance: 2,807

28 February 2012 33	Bury	1–2	Hartlepool United	Gigg Lane
19:45	Worrall 79'		Humphreys 45+1'; Boyd 74'	Attendance: 2,072

3 March 2012 34	Bury	3–3	Huddersfield Town	Gigg Lane
15:00	Schumacher 32'; John-Lewis 70'; Eastham 90+2'		Morrison 21'; Rhodes 25', 29'	Attendance: 5,988

6 March 2012 35	Sheffield Wednesday	4–1	Bury	Hillsborough Stadium
19:45	Antonio 11', 58'; Madine 51'; Lowe 64'		Schumacher 72'	Attendance: 17,684

10 March 2012 36	Carlisle United	4–1	Bury	Brunton Park
15:00	Noble 25'; Cook 78'; Miller 88' (pen.), 90+3'		Coke 23'	Attendance: 4,855

17 March 2012 37	Bury	1–4	Wycombe Wanderers	Gigg Lane
15:00	Harrad 11'		Beavon 4', 61', 70'; Hayes 12'	Attendance: 2,479

20 March 2012 38	Bury	0–0	Scunthorpe United	Gigg Lane
19:45				Attendance: 2,351

24 March 2012 39	Preston North End	1–1	Bury	Deepdale
15:00	Aneke 68'		Elford-Alliyu 90+3'	Attendance: 1,735

31 March 2012 40	Bury	2–0	Tranmere Rovers	Gigg Lane
15:00	Sodje 67'; Coke 72'			Attendance: 3,733

7 April 2012 41	Brentford	3–0	Bury	Griffin Park
15:00	Saunders 44', 63'; Logan 68'			Attendance: 5,192

9 April 2012 42	Bury	4–1	Colchester United	Gigg Lane
15:00	Grella 40'; Harrad 43'; Coke 56'; Worrall 73'		Eastman 57'	Attendance: 3,119

14 April 2012 43	Bury	1–0	AFC Bournemouth	Gigg Lane
15:00	Grella 10'			Attendance: 2,729

21 April 2012 44	Notts County	2–4	Bury	Meadow Lane
15:00	Coke 46' (o.g.); Edwards 79'		Worrall 42'; Grella 49', 67'; Carrington 90+3'	Attendance: 6,732

28 April 2012 45	Bury	0–0	Oldham Athletic	Gigg Lane
15:00				Attendance: 5,111

5 May 2012 46	Stevenage	3–0	Bury	The Lamex Stadium
15:00	Reid 24'; Byrom 77' (pen.); Beardsley 90+1'			Attendance: 4,781

=== FA Cup ===
12 November 2011 First round	Bury	0–2	Crawley Town	Gigg Lane
15:00	Byrne (yellow card) 15'; Schumacher (yellow card) 59'; Hughes (yellow card) 83'		Barnett 49'; Doughty 82'	Attendance: 2,436; Referee: Mark Brown

=== League Cup ===
9 August 2011 First round	Bury	3–1	Coventry City	Gigg Lane
19:45	Bishop 33'; Lowe 75', 88'		O'Donovan 26'	Attendance: 2,997

23 August 2011 Second round	Bury	2–4	Leicester City	Gigg Lane
19:45	Jones 40'; Lowe 53'		Schlupp 21'; Gallagher 70'; Dyer 77'; Danns 90'	Attendance: 3,779

=== Football League Trophy ===
30 August 2011 First round	Bury	0–0 (2–4 p)	Crewe Alexandra	Gigg Lane
19:45				Attendance: 1,295
	Penalties
	Cregg (penalty missed); Bishop (penalty missed); Worrall (penalty scored); Picken (penalty scored)		Westwood (penalty scored); Shelley (penalty scored); Davis (penalty scored); Bell (penalty scored)

== Transfers ==
Players transferred in
Date	Pos.	Name	Previous club	Fee	Ref.
22 June 2011	DF	(England) Mark Hughes	(Australia) North Queensland Fury	Free Transfer	
11 August 2011	MF	(Republic of Ireland) Patrick Cregg	(Scotland) St Mirren	Free	
31 August 2011	FW	(England) Shaun Harrad	(England) Northampton Town	Undisclosed	
29 September 2011	MF	(England) Mark Carrington	(Scotland) Hamilton Academical	Free	
27 February 2012	FW	(United States) Mike Grella	(England) Brentford	Free	
Players loaned in
Date from	Pos.	Name	From	Date to	Ref.
20 July 2011	FW	(England) Mark Cullen	(England) Hull City	31 December 2011	
15 August 2011	FW	(England) Kudus Oyenuga	(England) Tottenham Hotspur	15 September 2011	
25 August 2011	DF	(England) Ashley Eastham	(England) Blackpool	End of season	
31 August 2011	MF	(Republic of Ireland) Shane Byrne	(England) Leicester City	31 September 2011	
31 August 2011	MF	(England) Giles Coke	(England) Sheffield Wednesday	31 October 2011	
12 September 2011	GK	(Northern Ireland) Trevor Carson	(England) Sunderland	12 November 2011	
23 September 2011	FW	(England) David Amoo	(England) Liverpool	End of season	
13 January 2012	MF	(England) Giles Coke	(England) Sheffield Wednesday	End of season	
17 January 2012	FW	(Wales) Ryan Doble	(England) Southampton	17 February 2012	
20 February 2012	FW	(England) Lateef Elford-Alliyu	(England) West Bromwich Albion	End of season	
24 February 2012	GK	(Northern Ireland) Trevor Carson	(England) Sunderland	1 April 2012	
9 March 2012	DF	(England) Nathan Clarke	(England) Huddersfield Town	End of season	
22 March 2012	GK	(Wales) Jonathan Bond	(England) Watford	End of season	
Players loaned out
Date from	Pos.	Name	To	Date to	Ref.
19 August 2011	DF	(England) Ben Futcher	(England) Mansfield Town	5 November 2011	
16 September 2011	MF	(England) Andy Haworth	(England) Oxford United	16 October 2011	
22 November 2011	FW	(England) Danny Hudson	(England) Mossley	21 March 2012	
24 November 2011	MF	(England) Luke McCarthy	(England) Grimsby Town	1 January 2012	
11 January 2012	MF	(England) Andy Haworth	(England) Bradford City	14 April 2012	
20 January 2012	DF	(England) Ben Futcher	(England) AFC Telford United	19 February 2012	
8 February 2012	FW	(England) Shaun Harrad	(England) Rotherham United	8 March 2012	
20 February 2012	DF	(England) Ben Futcher	(England) Macclesfield Town	End of season	
3 March 2012	GK	(England) Cameron Belford	(England) Southend United	End of season	
Players transferred out
Date	Pos.	Name	Subsequent club	Fee	Ref
1 July 2011	MF	(England) Kyle Bennett	(England) Doncaster Rovers	£80,000	
30 August 2011	FW	(England) Ryan Lowe	(England) Sheffield Wednesday	£100,000	
31 August 2011	MF	(France) Damien Mozika	(England) Scunthorpe United	Undisclosed	
13 January 2012	MF	(England) Mike Jones	(England) Sheffield Wednesday	£100,000	
Players released
Date	Pos.	Name	Subsequent club	Join date	Ref.
1 July 2011	MF	(England) Krishnan Patel	Unattached		

== Awards ==
End of Season Awards	Winner
Player of the Season	David Worrall
Players Player of the Season	David Worrall
Young Player of the Season	Andrai Jones
Goal of the Season	Peter Sweeney vs Walsall
