= 2012–13 Barnsley F.C. season =

Barnsley
2012–13 season
- Chairman: Patrick Cryne
- Manager: Keith Hill (until 29 December 2012); David Flitcroft (from 30 December 2012)
- Football League Championship: 21st
- FA Cup: Quarter-finals
- Football League Cup: Second round
- Top goalscorer: League: Craig Davies (8); All: Chris Dagnall (9); Craig Davies (9)
- Highest home attendance: 15,744 vs Hull City, 27 April
- Lowest home attendance: 8,088 vs Bristol City, 1 September
Home colours	Away colours

The 2012–13 season was Barnsley's seventh consecutive season in the Championship since promotion in 2006. They narrowly survived relegation thanks to a 2–2 draw with Huddersfield Town on the final day of the season to finish in 21st position.

== Season review ==
=== Championship ===
==== League table ====
Pos	Team	Pld	W	D	L	GF	GA	GD	Pts	Promotion or relegation
19	Huddersfield Town	46	15	13	18	53	73	−20	58	
20	Millwall	46	15	11	20	51	62	−11	56	
21	Barnsley	46	14	13	19	56	70	−14	55	
22	Peterborough United (R)	46	15	9	22	66	75	−9	54	Relegation to Football League One
23	Wolverhampton Wanderers (R)	46	14	9	23	55	69	−14	51	Relegation to Football League One

Updated to match(es) played on 4 May 2013. Source: BBC Sport
Rules for classification: 1) points; 2) goal difference; 3) number of goals scored.
(R) Relegated

==== Results summary ====
Overall								Home						Away					
Pld	W	D	L	GF	GA	GD	Pts	W	D	L	GF	GA	GD	W	D	L	GF	GA	GD
44	14	12	18	58	66	−8	54	9	4	8	29	28	+1	5	8	10	29	38	−9

Last updated: 5 May 2013.

==== Result round by round ====
Round	1	2	3	4	5	6	7	8	9	10	11	12	13	14	15	16	17	18	19	20	21	22	23	24	25	26	27	28	29	30	31	32	33	34	35	36	37	38	39	40	41	42	43	44	45	46
Ground	H	A	A	H	H	A	A	H	H	A	A	H	H	A	A	H	A	H	H	A	A	H	A	H	H	A	H	A	H	A	A	H	A	H	A	H	H	A	H	A	A	H	H	A	H	A
Result	W	L	L	W	D	L	W	D	L	L	W	D	L	L	L	L	D	L	D	L	L	L	W	L	L	L	W	D	W	W	W	W	L	L	D	W	W	L	W	D	D	L	D	D	W	D
Position	5	16	20	12	12	17	12	13	16	19	17	17	19	20	21	21	20	20	20	21	22	23	22	23	24	24	23	23	23	22	22	20	21	21	22	21	20	23	20	20	19	22	23	23	22	21

Updated to match(es) played on 5 May 2013. Source:
A = Away; H = Home; W = Win; D = Draw; L = Loss

== Squad ==
No.	Name	Position (s)	Nationality	Place of birth	Date of birth (age)	Club caps	Club goals	Signed from	Date signed	Fee	Contract End
Goalkeepers
1	Luke Steele	GK	(England)	Peterborough	24 September 1984 (aged 28)	194	0	West Bromwich Albion	21 May 2008	Free	2013
12	Ben Alnwick	GK	(England)	Prudhoe	1 January 1987 (aged 26)	12	0	Tottenham Hotspur	4 July 2012	Free	2014
30	Lukas Lidakevicius	GK	(Lithuania)		29 April 1993 (aged 20)	0	0	Academy	1 July 2013	Free	2013
Defenders
2	Bobby Hassell	RB/CB	(England)	Derby	4 June 1980 (aged 33)	293	9	Mansfield Town	1 July 2004	Free	2013
3	Scott Golbourne	LB/LW	(England)	Bristol	29 February 1988 (aged 25)	47	2	Exeter City	30 January 2012	Undisclosed	2014
4	Rob Edwards	CB	(Wales)	Madeley	25 December 1982 (aged 30)	18	0	Blackpool	1 July 2011	Free	2013
6	Stephen Foster	CB	(England)	Warrington	18 September 1980 (aged 32)	244	12	Burnley	27 August 2007	£100,000	2013
14	Scott Wiseman	CB/RB	(England)	Hull	13 December 1985 (aged 27)	85	1	Rochdale	21 June 2011	Free	2014
15	Jimmy McNulty	CB/LB	(Scotland)	Liverpool	13 February 1985 (aged 28)	60	2	Brighton & Hove Albion	24 June 2011	Undisclosed	2013
18	Andrai Jones	RB	(England)	Liverpool	1 January 1992 (aged 21)	2	0	Bury	1 January 2013	Free	2014
25	Martin Cranie	CB	(England)	Yeovil	23 September 1986 (aged 26)	41	0	Coventry City	20 August 2012	Free	2013
33	Tom Kennedy	LB/CB	(England)	Bury	24 June 1985 (aged 28)	28	0	Leicester City	31 August 2012	Free	2013
Midfielders
5	Rory Delap	CM/CB	(England)	Sutton Coldfield	6 July 1976 (aged 36)	7	0	Stoke City	31 January 2013	Loan	2013
7	Stephen Dawson	CM/RM	(Republic of Ireland)	Dublin	4 December 1985 (aged 27)	36	4	Leyton Orient	31 January 2012	Undisclosed	2014
8	Jim O'Brien	RW	(Republic of Ireland)	Vale of Leven	28 September 1987 (aged 25)	100	5	Motherwell	1 June 2010	Free	2014
10	Matt Done	LW/AM	(England)	Oswestry	22 July 1988 (aged 24)	48	4	Rochdale	21 June 2011	Undisclosed	2013
11	David Perkins	CM	(England)	Heysham	21 June 1982 (aged 31)	75	2	Colchester United	1 June 2011	Free	2014
17	Paul Digby	CM	(England)	Sheffield	2 February 1995 (aged 18)	4	0	Academy	1 July 2011	Free	2014
19	Tomasz Cywka	RW/AM	(Poland)	Gliwice	27 June 1988 (aged 25)	32	5	Reading	6 August 2012	Free	2013
20	Toni Silva	WG	(Portugal)	Bissau	15 September 1993 (aged 19)	1	0	Liverpool	23 July 2012	Free	2013
21	Jacob Mellis	AM	(England)	Nottingham	8 January 1991 (aged 22)	40	6	Chelsea	19 June 2012	Free	2014
23	Kelvin Etuhu	AM/WG/CF	(Nigeria)	Kano	30 May 1988 (aged 25)	32	0	Portsmouth	8 June 2012	Free	2013
Forwards
9	Jason Scotland	CF	(Trinidad and Tobago)	Morvant	18 February 1979 (aged 34)	20	6	Ipswich Town	28 January 2013	Free	2013
13	Chris Dagnall	CF	(England)	Liverpool	15 April 1986 (aged 27)	51	10	Scunthorpe United	5 January 2012	Undisclosed	2014
16	Marlon Harewood	CF	(England)	London	25 October 1979 (aged 33)	46	7	Nottingham Forest	14 August 2012	Free	2013
24	Reuben Noble-Lazarus	CF/WG	(England)	Huddersfield	16 August 1993 (aged 19)	34	1	Academy	29 September 2008	Trainee	2015
26	John Rooney	CF	(England)	Liverpool	17 December 1990 (aged 22)	1	0	Orlando City	25 October 2012	Free	2013
27	Chris O'Grady	CF	(England)	Nottingham	26 January 1986 (aged 27)	15	6	Sheffield Wednesday	31 January 2013	Loan	2013
31	Jordan Clark	CF	(England)	Hoyland	22 September 1993 (aged 19)	7	0	Academy	30 May 2011	Trainee	2014
32	Danny Rose	CF	(England)	Barnsley	10 December 1993 (aged 19)	11	2	Academy	30 March 2011	Trainee	2014

=== Appearances and goals ===
Last Updated: 5 May 2013

No.	Pos	Nat	Player	Total		Championship		FA Cup		League Cup	
No.	Pos	Nat	Player	Apps	Goals	Apps	Goals	Apps	Goals	Apps	Goals
1	GK	(England) ENG	Luke Steele	37	0	33	0	4	0	0	0
2	DF	(England) ENG	Bobby Hassell	21	2	11+6	1	2	0	1+1	1
3	DF	(England) ENG	Scott Golbourne	35	1	31	1	3	0	1	0
5	MF	(England) ENG	Rory Delap (on loan from Stoke City)	7	0	6	0	0+1	0	0	0
6	DF	(England) ENG	Stephen Foster	34	2	29+2	2	1+1	0	1	0
7	MF	(Republic of Ireland) IRL	Stephen Dawson	34	4	29+3	4	1	0	1	0
8	MF	(Scotland) SCO	Jim O'Brien	34	2	20+9	2	1+3	0	1	0
9	FW	(Trinidad and Tobago) TTO	Jason Scotland	20	6	6+12	6	0+2	0	0	0
11	MF	(England) ENG	David Perkins	40	1	31+4	1	4	0	1	0
12	GK	(England) ENG	Ben Alnwick	12	0	10	0	0	0	2	0
13	FW	(England) ENG	Chris Dagnall	42	10	25+11	5	4	3	1+1	2
14	DF	(England) ENG	Scott Wiseman	41	0	34+2	0	3	0	2	0
15	DF	(Scotland) SCO	Jimmy McNulty	14	0	10+2	0	1	0	1	0
16	FW	(England) ENG	Marlon Harewood	36	3	16+15	2	4	1	0+1	0
17	MF	(England) ENG	Paul Digby	0	0	0	0	0	0	0	0
18	DF	(England) ENG	Andrai Jones	2	0	1+1	0	0	0	0	0
19	MF	(Poland) POL	Tomasz Cywka	32	5	19+9	5	1+1	0	1+1	0
21	MF	(England) ENG	Jacob Mellis	40	6	31+4	6	2+1	0	2	0
23	MF	(Nigeria) NGR	Kelvin Etuhu	32	0	17+11	0	3	0	1	0
24	FW	(England) ENG	Reuben Noble-Lazarus	14	1	5+8	1	0+1	0	0	0
25	DF	(England) ENG	Martin Cranie	41	0	34+2	0	4	0	1	0
26	MF	(England) ENG	John Rooney	1	0	0+1	0	0	0	0	0
27	FW	(England) ENG	Chris O'Grady (on loan from Sheffield Wednesday)	15	6	13+2	6	0	0	0	0
31	FW	(England) ENG	Jordan Clark	1	0	0	0	0	0	0+1	0
32	FW	(England) ENG	Danny Rose	6	2	0+5	1	0+1	1	0	0
33	DF	(England) ENG	Tom Kennedy	28	0	23+1	0	4	0	0	0
Players who are on loan:
4	DF	(Wales) WAL	Rob Edwards (at Shrewsbury Town)	0	0	0	0	0	0	0	0
10	MF	(England) ENG	Matt Done (at Hibernian)	15	0	7+7	0	0	0	1	0
20	MF	(Portugal) POR	Toni Silva (at Dagenham & Redbridge)	1	0	0+1	0	0	0	0	0
Player who left Barnsley during the season
9	FW	(Wales) WAL	Craig Davies	23	9	20+1	8	0	0	2	1
18	FW	(Egypt) EGY	Mido	1	0	0+1	0	0	0	0	0
22	GK	(Colombia) COL	David González	3	0	3	0	0	0	0	0
27	FW	(England) ENG	Emile Sinclair (on loan from Peterborough United)	4	0	1+3	0	0	0	0	0
28	MF	(England) ENG	Jonathan Greening (on loan from Nottingham Forest)	6	1	6	1	0	0	0	0
28	MF	(England) ENG	Ryan Tunnicliffe (on loan from Manchester United)	3	0	2	0	1	0	0	0
29	FW	(England) ENG	Marcus Tudgay (on loan from Nottingham Forest)	9	3	8+1	3	0	0	0	0
34	DF	(England) ENG	John Stones	26	1	19+3	0	1+1	0	2	1
36	MF	(Hungary) HUN	Ákos Buzsáky (on loan from Portsmouth)	5	0	4+1	0	0	0	0	0

==== Top scorers ====
Place	Position	Nation	Number	Name	Championship	FA Cup	League Cup	Total
1	FW	(England)	13	Chris Dagnall	5	3	2	10
2	FW	(Wales)	9	Craig Davies	8	0	1	9
3	FW	(Trinidad and Tobago)	9	Jason Scotland	6	0	0	6
3	MF	(England)	21	Jacob Mellis	6	0	0	6
3	FW	(England)	27	Chris O'Grady	6	0	0	6
6	MF	(Poland)	19	Tomasz Cywka	5	0	0	5
7	MF	(Republic of Ireland)	7	Stephen Dawson	4	0	0	4
8	FW	(England)	16	Marlon Harewood	2	1	0	3
8	FW	(England)	29	Marcus Tudgay	3	0	0	3
10	DF	(England)	2	Bobby Hassell	1	0	1	2
10	DF	(England)	6	Stephen Foster	2	0	0	2
10	MF	(Scotland)	8	Jim O'Brien	2	0	0	2
10	MF	(England)	32	Danny Rose	1	1	0	2
14	DF	(England)	3	Scott Golbourne	1	0	0	1
14	MF	(England)	28	Jonathan Greening	1	0	0	1
14	FW	(England)	24	Reuben Noble-Lazarus	1	0	0	1
14	MF	(England)	11	David Perkins	1	0	0	1
14	DF	(England)	34	John Stones	0	0	1	1
14	Own Goals				1	0	0	1
				Totals	53	5	5	63

==== Disciplinary record ====
Number	Nation	Position	Name	Championship		FA Cup		League Cup		Total	
Number	Nation	Position	Name	Yellow card	Red card	Yellow card	Red card	Yellow card	Red card	Yellow card	Red card
1	(England)	GK	Luke Steele	1	0	0	0	0	0	1	0
2	(England)	DF	Bobby Hassell	2	1	0	0	1	0	3	1
3	(England)	DF	Scott Golbourne	4	0	0	0	0	0	4	0
5	(England)	MF	Rory Delap	2	0	0	0	0	0	2	0
6	(England)	DF	Stephen Foster	8	0	0	0	0	0	8	0
7	(Republic of Ireland)	MF	Stephen Dawson	5	1	0	0	0	0	5	1
8	(Scotland)	MF	Jim O'Brien	4	0	0	0	0	0	4	0
9	(Wales)	FW	Craig Davies	3	0	0	0	0	0	3	0
11	(England)	MF	David Perkins	5	0	0	0	0	0	5	0
12	(England)	GK	Ben Alnwick	0	0	0	0	0	1	0	1
13	(England)	FW	Chris Dagnall	1	0	0	0	1	0	2	0
14	(England)	DF	Scott Wiseman	3	0	1	0	0	0	4	0
15	(Scotland)	DF	Jimmy McNulty	2	0	1	0	1	0	4	0
16	(England)	FW	Marlon Harewood	1	0	1	0	0	0	2	0
18	(England)	DF	Andrai Jones	2	0	0	0	0	0	2	0
18	(Egypt)	FW	Mido	1	0	0	0	0	0	1	0
19	(Poland)	MF	Tomasz Cywka	2	0	0	0	0	0	2	0
21	(England)	MF	Jacob Mellis	6	0	1	0	0	0	7	0
23	(Nigeria)	FW	Kelvin Etuhu	3	0	1	0	0	0	4	0
24	(England)	FW	Reuben Noble-Lazarus	1	0	0	0	0	0	1	0
25	(England)	DF	Martin Cranie	5	0	0	0	0	0	5	0
27	(England)	FW	Chris O'Grady	2	0	0	0	0	0	2	0
28	(England)	MF	James Tunnicliffe	0	0	1	0	0	0	1	0
29	(England)	FW	Marcus Tudgay	2	0	0	0	0	0	2	0
33	(England)	DF	Tom Kennedy	1	1	0	0	0	0	1	1
34	(England)	DF	John Stones	1	0	0	0	0	0	1	0
36	(Hungary)	MF	Ákos Buzsáky	1	0	0	0	0	0	1	0
			Totals	67	3	6	0	3	1	76	4

==== Suspensions served ====
Date	Player	Reason	Games Missed
13 August	Ben Alnwick	(red card) v Rochdale	Middlesbrough (H), Wolves (A) & Brighton (A)
1 September	Bobby Hassell	(red card) v Bristol City	Blackpool (H), Blackburn (A) & Birmingham (A)
22 December	Stephen Foster	5× (yellow card)	Birmingham (H)
13 April	Tom Kennedy	(red card) v Charlton Athletic	Derby (H)

== Transfers ==
=== In ===
No.	Pos.	Nat.	Name	Age	EU	Moving from	Type	Transfer window	Ends	Transfer fee	Source
5	DF	(England)	Lee Collins	23	EU	Port Vale	Transfer	Summer	2014	£50,000^{1}	
	DF	(England)	Kilburn	—	EU	Youth system	Promoted	Summer	2013	Youth system	
	DF	(England)	Patterson	—	EU	Youth system	Promoted	Summer	2013	Youth system	
	DF	(England)	Scott	—	EU	Youth system	Promoted	Summer	2013	Youth system	
	DF	(England)	Steade	—	EU	Youth system	Promoted	Summer	2013	Youth system	
23	MF	(Nigeria)	Kelvin Etuhu	24	EU	Portsmouth	Free transfer	Summer	2013	Free	
21	MF	(England)	Jacob Mellis	21	EU	Chelsea	Free transfer	Summer	2014	Free	
18	FW	(Egypt)	Mido	29	EU	Zamalek (Egypt)	Free transfer	Summer	2013	Free	
12	GK	(England)	Ben Alnwick	25	EU	Tottenham Hotspur	Transfer	Summer	2014	Free	
30	GK	(Lithuania)	Lukas Lidakevicius	19	EU	Youth system	Promoted	Summer	2013	Youth system	
20	MF	(Portugal)	Toni Silva	18	EU	Liverpool	Free transfer	Summer	2014	Free	
19	MF	(Poland)	Tomasz Cywka	24	EU	Reading	Free transfer	Summer	2013	Free	
16	FW	(England)	Marlon Harewood	32	EU	Nottingham Forest	Free transfer	Summer	2013	Free	
22	GK	(Colombia)	David González	30	EU	Brighton & Hove Albion	Free transfer	Summer	Non=Contract	Free	
25	DF	(England)	Martin Cranie	25	EU	Coventry City	Free transfer	Summer	2013	Free	
33	DF	(England)	Tom Kennedy	27	EU	Free agent	Free transfer		2013	Free	
26	MF	(England)	John Rooney	21	EU	Free agent	Free transfer		2013	Free	
9	FW	(Trinidad and Tobago)	Jason Scotland	33	EU	Ipswich Town	Free transfer	Winter	2013	Free	
18	DF	(England)	Andrai Jones	22	EU	Bury	Free transfer	Winter	2014	Free	

Notes

^{1}Although official undisclosed, The Star reported the fee to be £50,000.

=== Loans in ===
No.	Pos.	Name	Country	Age	Loan club	Started	Ended	Start source	End source
29	FW	Marcus Tudgay	(England)	29	Nottingham Forest	14 November	2 January		
27	FW	Emile Sinclair	(England)	25	Peterborough United	20 November	2 January		
28	MF	Jonathan Greening	(England)	34	Nottingham Forest	21 November	2 January		
36	MF	Ákos Buzsáky	(Hungary)	30	Portsmouth	21 November	2 January		
5	MF	Rory Delap	(England)	36	Stoke City	31 January	30 May		
27	FW	Chris O'Grady	(England)	27	Sheffield Wednesday	31 January	30 May		
28	MF	Ryan Tunnicliffe	(England)	20	Manchester United	21 February	27 March		

Sources: For loan start source see "Start source". For loan end source see "End source".
EU = if holds or not a European Union passport; Country: when 2 flags, 1st flag = country that plays for internationally, 2nd flag = country of birth; No. = number on jersey; P = Position (for position name, pause mouse pointer on abbreviation); Name = Name on jersey (for more extensive name, pause mouse pointer on name); In/Out = In: The player came in on loan, Out: The player went out on loan; Loan club = the club that the player moved on loan to or the club that the player came from on loan; Started = the date when the player's loan started; Ended = the date when the player's loan ended.

=== Out ===
No.	Pos.	Name	Country	Age	Type	Moving to	Transfer window	Transfer fee	Apps	Goals	Source
17	MF	David Cotterill	(Wales)	24	Contract ended	Doncaster Rovers	Summer	Free	11	1	
5	MF	Nathan Doyle	(England)	25	Contract ended	Bradford City	Summer	N/A	99	2	
27	FW	Andy Gray	(Scotland) (England)	34	Contract ended	Leeds United	Summer	N/A	97	21	
3	DF	Jay McEveley	(Scotland) (England)	27	Contract ended	Swindon Town	Summer	N/A	49	0	
12	GK	David Preece	(England)	35	Contract ended		Summer	N/A	8	0	
29	MF	Alastair Taylor	(England)	20	Contract ended		Summer	N/A	7	0	
19	MF	Jacob Butterfield	(England)	22	Contract ended	Norwich City	Summer	Undisclosed ^{1}	100	8	
9	FW	Craig Davies	(Wales) (England)	27	Transfer	Bolton Wanderers	Winter	£300,000	69	20	
5	DF	Lee Collins	(England)	24	Contract terminated	Free agent	Winter	Free	7	0	
18	FW	Mido	(Egypt)	29	Contract terminated	Free agent	Winter	Free	1	0	
34	DF	John Stones	(England)	18	Transfer	Everton	Winter	£3,000,000	27	1	

EU = if holds or not a European Union passport; Country: when 2 flags, 1st flag = country that plays for internationally, 2nd flag = country of birth; N = number on jersey; P = Position (for position name, pause mouse pointer on abbreviation); Name = Name on jersey (for more extensive name, pause mouse pointer on name); Age = age on the day of the signing; Moving from = only indicate the club the player was playing before start playing for this club in this season, for the type of the moving see Status column; Moving to = only indicates the club the player is going to play next, for the type of the moving see Status column; Ends = when the player's current contract ends; n/a = Not applicable; Apps = Total number of competitive appearances (including substitute appearances) at the club prior to departure; Goals = Total number of competitive goals scored at the club prior to departure.

Notes

^{1}Because Butterfield is under 22, Barnsley were entitled to compensation and received an Undisclosed amount.

=== Loans out ===
No.	Pos.	Name	Country	Age	Loan club	Started	Ended	Start source	End source
5	DF	Lee Collins	(England)	24	Shrewsbury Town	28 September	29 November		
4	DF	Rob Edwards	(Wales) (England)	29	Fleetwood Town	10 October	9 November		
10	MF	Matt Done	(England)	24	Hibernian	31 January	30 May		
4	DF	Rob Edwards	(Wales) (England)	43	Shrewsbury Town	31 January	28 March		
20	FW	Toni Silva	(Portugal) (Guinea-Bissau)	19	Northampton Town	15 February	15 March		
32	FW	Jordan Clark	(England)	33	Chesterfield	22 February	27 March		
20	FW	Toni Silva	(Portugal) (Guinea-Bissau)	33	Dagenham & Redbridge	27 March	23 April		

Sources: For loan start source see "Start source". For loan end source see "End source".
EU = if holds or not a European Union passport; Country: when 2 flags, 1st flag = country that plays for internationally, 2nd flag = country of birth; No. = number on jersey; P = Position (for position name, pause mouse pointer on abbreviation); Name = Name on jersey (for more extensive name, pause mouse pointer on name); In/Out = In: The player came in on loan, Out: The player went out on loan; Loan club = the club that the player moved on loan to or the club that the player came from on loan; Started = the date when the player's loan started; Ended = the date when the player's loan ended.

=== Contracts ===
No.	Pos.	Nat.	Name	Age	Status	Contract length	Expiry date	Source
6	DF	(England)	Stephen Foster	31	Signed	1 year	June 2013	
19	MF	(England)	Jacob Butterfield	22	Rejected	2 years	June 2014	
8	MF	(Republic of Ireland) (Scotland)	Jim O'Brien	24	Signed	2 Years	June 2014	
11	MF	(England)	David Perkins	30	Signed	2 years	June 2014	
34	DF	(England)	John Stones	18	Signed	3 years	June 2015	
31	FW	(England)	Jordan Clark	18	Signed	2 years	June 2014	
32	FW	(England)	Danny Rose	18	Signed	2 years	June 2014	
33	DF	(England)	Tom Kennedy	27	Signed	6 months	June 2013	

== Fixtures & results ==
=== Pre-season ===
12 July Friendly	Barnsley	1–0	St Mirren	N/A
17:30 BST	Davies 4'	Report

17 July Friendly	Alfreton Town	1–2	Barnsley	Alfreton
19:45 BST	Trialist 70'		55', 61' Davies	Stadium: North Street

21 July Friendly	Rotherham United	2–1	Barnsley	Rotherham
15:00 BST	Noble 38'; Odejayi 45'	Report	37' Mellis	Stadium: New York Stadium

24 July Friendly	Stocksbridge Park Steels	0–0	Barnsley	Stocksbridge
19:30 BST				Stadium: Look Local Stadium

28 July Friendly	Barnsley	0–0	West Bromwich Albion	Barnsley
15:00 BST		Report		Stadium: Oakwell

4 August Friendly	Doncaster Rovers	2–2	Barnsley	Doncaster
15:00 BST	Woods 12'; Syers 77'	Report	25' (o.g.) Jones; 71' Davies	Stadium: Keepmoat Stadium

7 August Friendly	Crewe Alexandra	1–0	Barnsley	Crewe
19:45 BST	Dugdale 19'	Report		Stadium: Alexandra Stadium

11 August Friendly	Bradford City	–	Barnsley	Bradford
15:00 BST				Stadium: Valley Parade

=== Championship ===
18 August 1	Barnsley	1–0	Middlesbrough	Barnsley
15:00	Davies 45'			Stadium: Oakwell; Attendance: 12,203

21 August 2	Wolverhampton Wanderers	3–1	Barnsley	Wolverhampton
19:45	Ward 8'; Ebanks-Blake 61'; Edwards 70'		79' Cywka	Stadium: Molineux Stadium; Attendance: 24,400

25 August 3	Brighton & Hove Albion	5–1	Barnsley	Brighton
15:00	Barnes 4', 81'; Bridge 14'; Mackail-Smith 38', 50'		35' (pen.) Davies	Stadium: Falmer Stadium; Attendance: 24,594

1 September 4	Barnsley	1–0	Bristol City	Oakwell
15:00	Mellis 50'; Hassell (red card) 52'			Attendance: 8,088

15 September 5	Barnsley	1–1	Blackpool	Oakwell
15:00	Davies 14'		30' Ince	Attendance: 14,134

18 September 6	Blackburn Rovers	2–1	Barnsley	Ewood Park
19:45	Rhodes 45'; Nuno Gomes 85'		32' Mellis	Attendance: 12,772

22 September 7	Birmingham City	0–5	Barnsley	St Andrew's
15:00			50' Foster; 54', 60', 65', 73' Davies	Attendance: 13,893

29 September 8	Barnsley	1–1	Ipswich Town	Oakwell
15:00	Dawson 73'		6' Cresswell	Attendance: 8,571

2 October 9	Barnsley	0–2	Peterborough United	Oakwell
19:45			2' Boyd; 10' Barnett	Attendance: 8,319

7 October 10	Leeds United	1–0	Barnsley	Elland Road
15:00	Becchio 42' (pen.)			Attendance: 22,596

20 October 11	Charlton Athletic	0–1	Barnsley	The Valley
15:00			64' Cywka	Attendance: 26,185

23 October 12	Barnsley	1–1	Crystal Palace	Oakwell
19:45	Perkins 86'		11' Murray	Attendance: 8,195

27 October 13	Barnsley	1–4	Nottingham Forest	Oakwell
15:00	Harewood 24'		35' Halford; 42' Cox; 45' Cohen; 77' Jenas	Attendance: 10,186

3 November 2012 14	Hull City	1–0	Barnsley	KC Stadium
15:00	Aluko 16'			Attendance: 15,598

6 November 2012 15	Derby County	2–0	Barnsley	Pride Park Stadium
19:45	O'Connor 69'; Tyson 90'			Attendance: 20,808

10 November 2012 16	Barnsley	0–1	Huddersfield Town	Oakwell
15:00			36' Beckford	Attendance: 12,130

17 November 2012 17	Bolton Wanderers	1–1	Barnsley	Reebok Stadium
15:00	K Davies 24'		65' Davies	Attendance: 16,965

24 November 2012 18	Barnsley	1–2	Cardiff City	Oakwell
15:00	Mellis 75'		22' Nugent; 51' Gunnarsson; (yellow card) 26' (yellow-red card) 89'	Attendance: 8,227

27 November 2012 19	Barnsley	1–1	Burnley	Oakwell
19:45	Tudgay 37'		5' Austin	Attendance: 8,610

1 December 2012 20	Watford	4–1	Barnsley	Vicarage Road
15:00	Deeney 10', 66'; Yeates 59'; Vydra 83' (pen.)		90+4' Tudgay	Attendance: 11,335

8 December 2012 21	Leicester City	2–2	Barnsley	King Power Stadium
15:00	Knockaert 9'; Vardy 90'		27' Dawson; 39' Noble-Lazarus	Attendance: 23,579

15 December 2012 22	Barnsley	0–1	Sheffield Wednesday	Oakwell
17:20			35' O'Grady	Attendance: 12,484

22 December 2012 23	Millwall	1–2	Barnsley	The Den
15:00	A Smith (red card) 54'; Wood 80'		31' Dawson; 90+2' Tudgay	Attendance: 10,118

26 December 2012 24	Barnsley	1–2	Birmingham City	Oakwell
15:00	Greening 38'		35', 77' Davies	Attendance: 9,191

29 December 2012 25	Barnsley	1–3	Blackburn Rovers	Oakwell
15:00	Dawson 76'		29' King; 44' Rochina; 90' Rhodes	Attendance: 9,153

1 January 2013 26	Peterborough United	2–1	Barnsley	London Road Stadium
15:00	Bostwick 28'; Rowe 87'		79' Harewood	Attendance: 7,339

12 January 2013 27	Barnsley	2–0	Leeds United	Oakwell
15:00	Dagnall 63' (pen.), 66'			Attendance: 13,999

19 January 2013 28	Ipswich Town	1–1	Barnsley	Portman Road
15:00	Chambers 56'		89' Rose	Attendance: 15,913

29 January 2013 29	Barnsley	2–0	Millwall	Oakwell
19:45	Dagnall 56'; Scotland 67'			Attendance: 7,844

2 February 2013 30	Blackpool	1–2	Barnsley	Bloomfield Road
15:00	Ince 55'; Gilks (red card) 65'		25' O'Brien; 88' Scotland	Attendance: 13,965

9 February 2013 31	Middlesbrough	2–3	Barnsley	Riverside Stadium
15:00	Carayol 50'; Main 62'		6' O'Brien; 70' Golbourne; 76' Scotland	Attendance: 15,034

19 February 2013 32	Barnsley	2–1	Wolverhampton Wanderers	Oakwell
19:45	Dagnall 49'; Mellis 73'		7' Sigurðarson	Attendance: 10,972

23 February 2013 33	Bristol City	5–3	Barnsley	Ashton Gate Stadium
15:00	Stead 16', 52'; Fontaine 35'; Nyatanga 55'; Davies 67'		58' O'Grady; 82' Cywka; 90' Scotland	Attendance: 13,008

2 March 2013 34	Barnsley	2–3	Bolton Wanderers	Oakwell
15:00	Cywka 47'; O'Grady 53'		15' Ngog; 38' Spearing; 59' Dawson	Attendance: 10,862

5 March 2013 35	Burnley	1–1	Barnsley	Turf Moor
19:45	Austin 9'		84' Cywka	Attendance: 10,584

12 March 2013 36	Barnsley	2–1	Brighton & Hove Albion	Oakwell
19:45	Scotland 15'; Dagnall 64' (pen.)		59' Ulloa	Attendance: 7,869

16 March 2013 37	Barnsley	1–0	Watford	Oakwell
15:00	Hassell 35'			Attendance: 9,076

30 March 2013 38	Sheffield Wednesday	2–1	Barnsley	Hillsborough Stadium
15:00	Buxton (yellow card) 44' (yellow-red card) 87'; Madine 65'; R Johnson 77'		90' Mellis	Attendance: 29,697

1 April 2013 39	Barnsley	2–0	Leicester City	Oakwell
15:00	Keane 4' (o.g.); O'Grady 40'			Attendance: 10,429

6 April 2013 40	Crystal Palace	0–0	Barnsley	Selhurst Park
15:00				Attendance: 21,281

9 April 2013 41	Cardiff City	1–1	Barnsley	Cardiff City Stadium
19:45	Turner 59'		90' Foster	Attendance: 22,584

13 April 2013 42	Barnsley	0–6	Charlton Athletic	Oakwell
15:00	Dawson (red card) 62'; Kennedy (red card) 86'		4' Pritchard; 19' Jackson; 48' Kermorgant; 59' Harriott; 80' Kerkar; 90' Fuller	Attendance: 9,469

16 April 2013 43	Barnsley	1–1	Derby County	Oakwell
19:45	O'Grady 47'		90' Coutts	Attendance: 9,007

20 April 2013 44	Nottingham Forest	0–0	Barnsley	City Ground
15:00				Attendance: 22,230

27 April 45	Barnsley	2–0	Hull City	Oakwell
15:00	Mellis 4'; O'Grady 50'			Attendance: 15,744

4 May 46	Huddersfield	2–2	Barnsley	John Smith's Stadium
12:45	Beckford 53'; Vaughan 81'		O'Grady 14'; Scotland 74'	Attendance: 21,614

=== FA Cup ===
5 January 2013 Third round	Barnsley	1–0	Burnley	Oakwell
15:00 GMT	Rose 85'		(yellow card) 25' (yellow-red card) 37' Stock	Attendance: 5,091; Referee: Tierney

26 January 2013 Fourth round	Hull City	0–1	Barnsley	KC Stadium
15:00 GMT			70' Dagnall	Attendance: 9,932; Referee: Phil Stroud

16 February 2013 Fifth round	Milton Keynes Dons	1–3	Barnsley	Stadium:mk
15:00 GMT	Bowditch 61'; Smith (red card) 90'		3', 90' Dagnall; 19' Harewood	Attendance: 14,475; Referee: Jones

9 March 2013 Quarter-finals	Manchester City	5–0	Barnsley	City of Manchester Stadium
17:20 GMT	Tevez 11', 31', 50'; Kolarov 27'; Silva 65'			Attendance: 46,728; Referee: Taylor

=== Football League Cup ===
11 August First round	Rochdale	3–4 (a.e.t.)	Barnsley	Spotland Stadium
15:00 BST	Tutte 6'; Kennedy 90+4' (pen.) 105+2' (pen.)	Report	45' Stones; 105' Dagnall; 79' Davies; (red card) 90+2' Alnwick; 95' Wiseman	Attendance: 2,709; Referee: Gary Sutton

28 August Second round	Swansea City	3–1	Barnsley	Liberty Stadium
19:45	Graham 24'; Moore 59', 88'	Report	69' Hassell	Attendance: 9,052; Referee: Hooper
