= Shaun Harrad =

English footballer (born 1984)

Personal information
- Full name: Shaun Nicholas Harrad
- Date of birth: 11 December 1984 (age 41)
- Place of birth: Nottingham, England
- Height: 1.78 m (5 ft 10 in)
- Position: Forward

Senior career*
Years	Team	Apps	(Gls)
2002–2005	Notts County	29	(1)
2003	→ Gresley Rovers (loan)	10	(7)
2004	→ Tamworth (loan)	6	(3)
2005–2011	Burton Albion	227	(69)
2011	Northampton Town	18	(6)
2011–2014	Bury	44	(2)
2012	→ Rotherham United (loan)	8	(3)
2012–2013	→ Cheltenham Town (loan)	31	(8)
2014	Alfreton Town	16	(7)
2014–2015	Notts County	12	(2)
2015	→ Cheltenham Town (loan)	12	(1)
2015–2016	Worcester City	10	(0)
2016	Torquay United	18	(3)
2016–2017	Wrexham	18	(2)
2017	Torquay United	15	(1)
2017–2019	Matlock Town	39	(22)
2018–2019	→ Grantham Town (loan)	5	(3)
2019	Basford United	8	(2)
2019	Barwell	1	(0)
2019	Ilkeston Town	13	(5)
2021	Bingham Town (Note: Bingham Town withdrew from the Nottinghamshire Senior League Premier Division part-way through the 2021–22 season and their record was expunged)	0	(0)
2021	Newark	2	(2)

International career
2007–2009	England C	10	(1)

Managerial career
- 2018: Matlock Town (player-assistant)
- 2019: Ilkeston Town (player-assistant)
- * Club domestic league appearances and goals as of 13 July 2023

Shaun Nicholas Harrad (born 11 December 1984) is an English footballer who plays as a forward.

== Playing career ==
=== Notts County ===
Harrad began his career at Notts County, making 29 appearances and scoring one goal. He spent loan spells out at Gresley Rovers and Tamworth, before being released in 2005.

=== Burton Albion ===
He joined Burton Albion of the Conference National in 2005, and was part of the team which held Manchester United to a 0–0 draw in the third round of the 2005–06 FA Cup. The Brewers won the Conference in 2008–09, gaining promotion to the Football League, with Harrad scoring 16 goals during the season. He was the club's top scorer with 21 League goals in the 2009–10 season, and scored his first career hat-trick against Rotherham United on 11 September 2010.

=== Northampton Town ===
On 20 January 2011, Northampton Town signed Harrad for £35,000 on a two-and-a-half-year contract.

=== Bury ===
On 31 August 2011, Bury signed Harrad for an undisclosed fee, on a three-year contract. He was given the squad number 25.

Harrad joined Rotherham United on loan in February 2012, on an emergency loan deal, and scored three times for the Millers in his spell there. On 3 August 2012, Harrad was loaned to League Two club Cheltenham Town for the full 2012–13 season.

On 16 January 2014, Harrad had his contract cancelled at Bury.

=== Alfreton Town and return to Notts County ===
He signed for Alfreton Town on a contract until the end of the season that same day.

On 21 August 2014, Harrad signed a contract with Notts County, until January 2015. In November 2014, his contract was extended until the end of the season. Harrad was loaned to Cheltenham Town on 26 February 2015 until the end of the season. At the end of the 2014–15 season, Harrad was released by Notts.

=== Later career ===
After a spell at Worcester City, Harrad joined Torquay United in January 2016 on a contract until the end of the season.

On 26 July 2016, Harrad signed a 6-month contract with Wrexham. He made his debut for the club on the opening day of the 2016–17 season, in a 0–0 draw with Dover Athletic. In January 2017, Wrexham manager Dean Keates decided against extending Harrad's contract at the club and he was subsequently released. He re-joined Torquay United on a deal until the end of the season later that month.

On 15 July 2017 Harrad signed for Northern Premier League Premier Division side Matlock Town on a one-year deal. On 27 April 2018, Dave Hoole was appointed as the new manager for Matlock Town, where Harrad was going to function as a playing assistant manager. Hoole resigned on 11 September 2018, and Harrad left the position as an assistant manager, but continued at the club just as a player. On 5 December 2018, Harrad was loaned out to Grantham Town for a month. As he came back from the loan, he was released by Matlock.

Two days later, on 9 January 2019, Harrad joined Basford United.

Harrad joined Southern League Premier Division Central side Barwell on 16 July 2019 following a successful trial period with the club. On 15 August 2019, Harrad joined Ilkeston Town as a player and assistant manager. He left the club three months later by mutual agreement.

== Career statistics ==
As of match played 4 December 2021.

Appearances and goals by club, season and competition
Club	Season	League			FA Cup		League Cup		Other		Total	
Club	Season	Division	Apps	Goals	Apps	Goals	Apps	Goals	Apps	Goals	Apps	Goals
Notts County	2002–03	Division Two	5	0	0	0	0	0	0	0	5	0
Notts County	2003–04	Division Two	8	0	1	0	0	0	0	0	9	0
Notts County	2004–05	League Two	16	1	2	0	0	0	0	0	18	1
Notts County	Total		29	1	3	0	0	0	0	0	32	1
Gresley Rovers (loan)	2003–04	Southern League Western Division	10	7	0	0	—		6 (Note: Three appearances two goals in FA Trophy; three appearances one goal in Southern League Cup)	3	16	10
Tamworth (loan)	2004–05	Conference National	6	3	0	0	—		0	0	6	3
Burton Albion	2005–06	Conference National	38	7	5	2	—		0	0	43	9
Burton Albion	2006–07	Conference National	41	1	1	0	—		0	0	42	1
Burton Albion	2007–08	Conference Premier	46	16	3	0	—		3 (Note: One appearance in FA Trophy; two appearances in Conference Premier play-offs)	0	52	16
Burton Albion	2008–09	Conference Premier	40	14	1	0	—		2 (Note: Appearance(s) in FA Trophy)	0	43	14
Burton Albion	2009–10	League Two	42	21	2	1	0	0	1 (Note: Appearance(s) in Football League Trophy)	0	45	22
Burton Albion	2010–11	League Two	20	10	2	2	1	1	0	0	23	13
Burton Albion	Total		227	69	14	5	1	1	6	0	248	75
Northampton Town	2010–11	League Two	18	6	0	0	0	0	0	0	18	6
Bury	2011–12	League One	26	2	1	0	0	0	0	0	27	2
Bury	2012–13	League One	0	0	0	0	0	0	0	0	0	0
Bury	2013–14	League Two	18	0	2	1	1	1	1	0	22	2
Bury	Total		44	2	3	1	1	1	1	0	49	4
Rotherham United (loan)	2011–12	League Two	8	3	0	0	0	0	0	0	8	3
Cheltenham Town (loan)	2012–13	League Two	31	8	3	2	1	0	2 (Note: One appearance in Football League Trophy; one appearance in League Two play-offs)	0	37	10
Alfreton Town	2013–14	Conference Premier	16	7	0	0	—		0	0	16	7
Notts County	2014–15	League One	12	2	2	0	0	0	2	0	16	2
Cheltenham Town (loan)	2014–15	League Two	12	1	0	0	0	0	0	0	12	1
Worcester City	2015–16	National League North	10	0	3	0	—		2	0	15	0
Torquay United	2015–16	National League	18	3	0	0	—		0	0	18	3
Wrexham	2016–17	National League	18	2	2	2	—		1	0	21	4
Torquay United	2016–17	National League	15	1	0	0	—		0	0	15	1
Matlock Town	2017–18	Northern Premier League Premier Division	33	19	1	0	—		4 (Note: One appearance two goals in FA Trophy; two appearances one goal in Northern Premier League Challenge Cup; one appearance in Derbyshire Senior Cup)	3	38	22
Matlock Town	2018–19	Northern Premier League Premier Division	6	3	1	1	—		0	0	7	4
Matlock Town	Total		39	22	2	1	—		4	3	45	26
Grantham Town (loan)	2018–19	Northern Premier League Premier Division	5	3	0	0	—		0	0	5	3
Basford United	2018–19	Northern Premier League Premier Division	8	2	0	0	—		1 (Note: Appearance(s) in Nottinghamshire Senior Cup)	0	9	2
Barwell	2019–20	Southern League Premier Division Central	1	0	0	0	—		0	0	1	0
Ilkeston Town	2019–20	Northern Premier League D1 South East	13	5	0	0	—		3 (Note: One appearance in FA Trophy; one appearance in Northern Premier League Challenge Cup; one appearance in Derbyshire Senior Cup)	0	16	5
Bingham Town	2021–22	Nottinghamshire Senior League Premier Division	—		—		—		1 (Note: Appearance(s) in Nottinghamshire Senior League Cup)	1	1	1
Newark	2021–22	United Counties League Premier Division North	2	2	—		—		1	0	3	2
Career total			542	149	32	11	3	2	30	7	607	169

== Honours ==
Burton Albion

- Conference Premier: 2008–09
