= Lenell John-Lewis =

English footballer (born 1989)

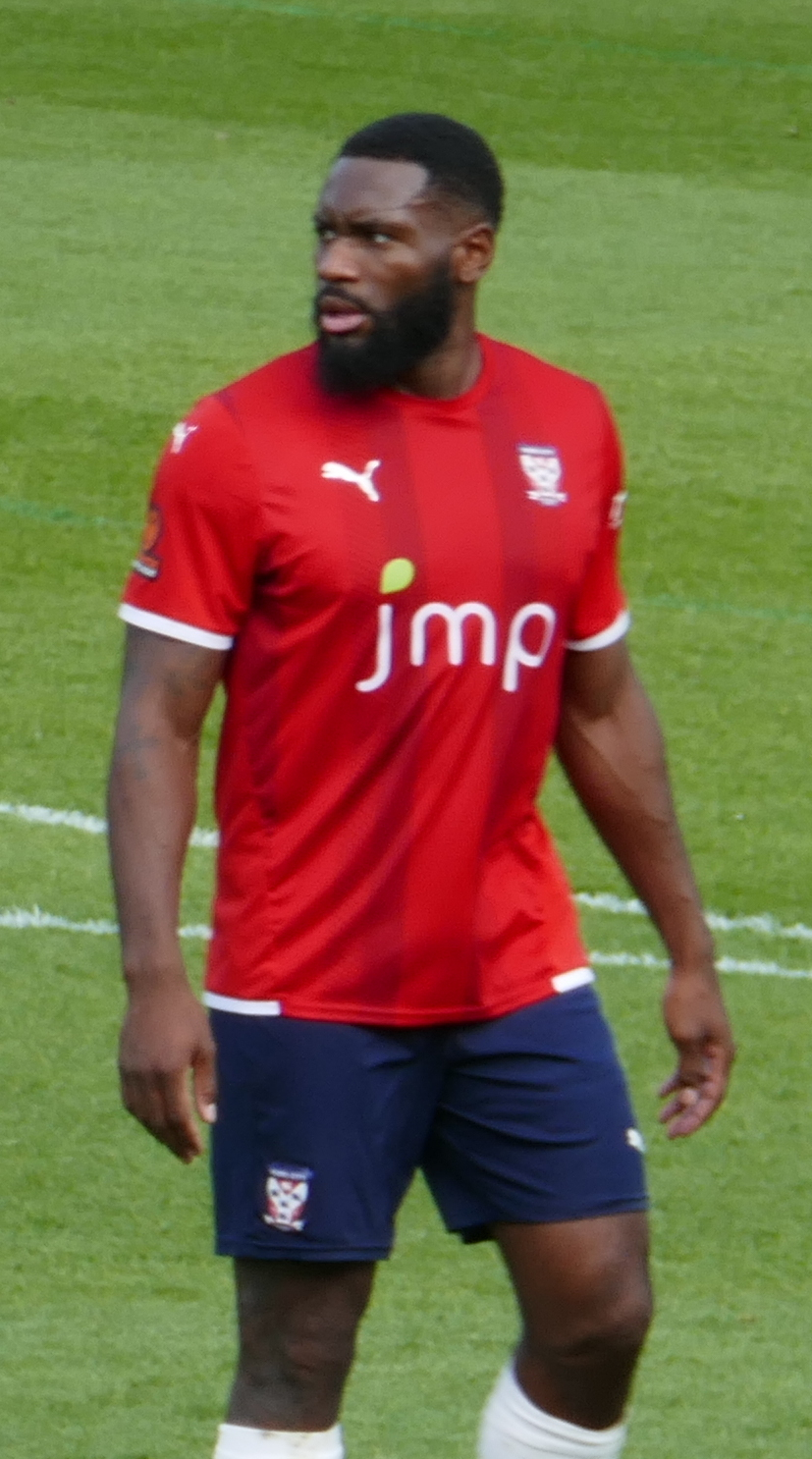
- John-Lewis playing for York City in 2022

Personal information
- Full name: Lenell Nicholas John-Lewis
- Date of birth: 17 May 1989 (age 37)
- Place of birth: Hammersmith, England
- Height: 5 ft 11 in (1.80 m)
- Positions: Striker; winger

Team information
- Current team: Boston United

Youth career
- –2006: Grantham Town

Senior career*
Years	Team	Apps	(Gls)
2006	Grantham Town	4	(0)
2006–2010	Lincoln City	72	(8)
2010–2013	Bury	83	(9)
2013–2015	Grimsby Town	92	(23)
2015–2017	Newport County	30	(3)
2017–2020	Shrewsbury Town	53	(3)
2020–2021	Hereford	17	(12)
2021–2022	Grimsby Town	29	(5)
2022	→ York City (loan)	22	(7)
2022–2025	York City	73	(23)
2025–	Boston United	37	(11)
- * Club domestic league appearances and goals as of 14:21, 19 May 2026 (UTC)

Lenell Nicholas John-Lewis (born 17 May 1989) is an English professional footballer who plays as a striker for National League club Boston United.

He began his career with non-league side Grantham Town before later turning professional with Lincoln City. He later took in spells with Bury, Grimsby Town, Newport County, Shrewsbury Town and Hereford.

== Career ==
=== Grantham Town ===
John-Lewis started his career with Grantham Town. After going on trial for Middlesbrough, and being linked with Cardiff City, he joined Lincoln City where he was awarded a scholarship.

=== Lincoln City ===
He made his Lincoln debut in the FA Cup against Port Vale on 11 November 2006. He scored his first goal in his second league appearance, against Stockport County on 4 December 2007. On 26 December 2007, John-Lewis scored an equaliser in the 51st minute, smashing the ball home off the bar into the top corner in the 2–1 defeat at Bradford City.

On 7 May 2010 John-Lewis was placed on the transfer list by Lincoln City manager Chris Sutton. Two weeks later, he departed the club by mutual consent.

=== Bury ===
On 5 August 2010 he signed a twelve-month contract with Bury after impressing manager Alan Knill. John-Lewis was part of Bury's promotion winning side, playing in Bury's 3–2 victory over Chesterfield, coming on as a substitute in the final game of the season at Proact Stadium, seeing Bury promoted after a ten-year absence from League One. In May 2011 he was offered a new 12-month contract, which he signed in June 2011.

=== Grimsby Town ===
On 31 January 2013 John-Lewis signed for Grimsby Town on an 18-month deal. He scored his first goal for the club in the final league game of the 2012–13 season against Woking, a header on the line in the 75th minute, having already sealed a play-off spot.

In May 2014 he activated a clause in his contract giving him another year with The Mariners. On 25 October 2014 he scored a brace against Guiseley in the 3–0 victory of the FA Cup First Round, heading in the second goal from a blocked Nathan Arnold shot, the third goal of the game came when Arnold fired the ball across goal after cutting in from the left for John-Lewis to tap in at the far post.

On 17 May 2015, John-Lewis scored the opening goal inside two minutes against Bristol Rovers, in the 2015 Conference Premier play-off final at Wembley, he forced the ball over the line from close range with a header, Rovers equalised later in the first half, the game went to extra-time, but with the game still at a stalemate, Grimsby ended up losing 5–3 on penalties, John-Lewis having scored his penalty kick.

John-Lewis featured in 39 league games during the 2014–15 season, scoring 16 goals, 4 of which were from penalties, this was his best tally of his career so far.

=== Newport County ===
On 29 May 2015, John-Lewis signed for League Two club Newport County on a two-year contract. He made his debut for Newport on 8 August 2015 versus Cambridge United. He scored his first goal for Newport on 3 October 2015 in the League Two match versus Exeter City.

His time at Newport County was blighted by injury. He missed half of the 2015–16 season due to a hamstring injury. In July 2016 he suffered a knee injury in a pre-season friendly match causing him to miss most of the 2016–17 season. Returning to the side for the last two matches of the season, he played a key role in securing the clubs Football League status by winning a penalty which was successfully converted by Mickey Demetriou to open the scoring in a final day victory over Notts County.

=== Shrewsbury Town ===
On 26 May 2017, it was announced that John-Lewis had signed a one-year deal with League One side Shrewsbury Town, with the option of a further year. He scored his first goal for Shrewsbury on his debut in a 1−0 win over Northampton Town on 5 August 2017.

He was offered a new contract by Shrewsbury at the end of the 2017–18 season.

He was injured in January 2019. He signed a new six-month contract with the club in May 2019 but was released by Shrewsbury in January 2020

=== Hereford ===
On 7 February 2020, John-Lewis signed for Shrewsbury's local rivals Hereford on a deal until the end of the 2019–20 season.

=== Return to Grimsby Town ===
On 1 February 2021, John-Lewis re-signed for Grimsby Town in EFL League Two, on a permanent deal until Summer 2022, joining up with former manager Paul Hurst whom he played under in his previous spell with Grimsby and at Shrewsbury.

On 15 February 2022, John-Lewis signed for York City on a one-month loan. He made his debut later that day, coming on as a 76th-minute substitute in a 3–1 win against AFC Telford United. The loan was further extended until the end of the 2021–22 season.

John-Lewis scored a vital goal for York as they beat AFC Fylde to secure a play-off place in a 2–1 victory on 2 May 2022. In the play-off quarter finals John-Lewis scored again in a 2–1 victory over Chorley to advance to the semi-finals. On 14 May, John-Lewis would score the only goal in York's 1–0 win over Brackley Town to advance to the National League North play-off final.

He capped off his final appearance of his loan spell by scoring the first goal in a 2–0 win over Boston United in the play-off final, which secured York's promotion to the National League.

Grimsby secured promotion with victory in the play-off final, though John-Lewis was not in the matchday squad at London Stadium.

On 11 June 2022, following Grimsby's promotion back to the Football League the club announced their retained list ahead of the 2022–23 season and confirmed that John-Lewis would be among those released when his contract expires on 30 June.

=== York City ===
Following the success of his loan spell, John-Lewis signed a permanent deal with York City on 29 June 2022.

=== Boston United ===
On 1 July 2025, John-Lewis signed for fellow National League side Boston United on an initial one-year deal with an option for a further year.

== Career statistics ==
As of match played on 20 April 2024

Appearances and goals by club, season and competition
Club	Season	League			FA Cup		League Cup		Other		Total	
Club	Season	Division	Apps	Goals	Apps	Goals	Apps	Goals	Apps	Goals	Apps	Goals
Grantham Town	2005–06	Southern League Premier Division	4	0	0	0	0	0	0	0	4	0
Lincoln City	2006–07	League Two	0	0	1	0	0	0	0	0	1	0
Lincoln City	2007–08	League Two	21	3	1	0	0	0	0	0	22	3
Lincoln City	2008–09	League Two	27	4	2	1	1	0	1 (Note: Appearance in Football League Trophy)	0	31	5
Lincoln City	2009–10	League Two	24	1	2	0	0	0	1	0	27	1
Lincoln City	Total		72	8	6	1	1	0	2	0	81	9
Bury	2010–11	League Two	39	2	2	0	1	0	2	0	44	2
Bury	2011–12	League One	28	5	0	0	2	0	0	0	30	5
Bury	2012–13	League One	16	2	1	0	1	0	1	0	19	2
Bury	Total		83	9	3	0	4	0	3	0	93	9
Grimsby Town	2012–13	Conference Premier	15	1	0	0	0	0	2 (Note: Appearance(s) in FA Trophy)	0	17	1
Grimsby Town	2013–14	Conference Premier	38	6	3	1	0	0	6 (Note: Four appearances and two goals in FA Trophy, two appearances in Conference Premier play-offs)	2	47	9
Grimsby Town	2014–15	Conference Premier	39	16	2	2	0	0	6 (Note: Three appearances in FA Trophy, three appearances and two goals in Conference Premier play-offs)	2	47	20
Grimsby Town	Total		92	23	5	3	0	0	14	4	111	30
Newport County	2015–16	League Two	28	3	3	2	0	0	1	0	32	5
Newport County	2016–17	League Two	2	0	0	0	0	0	0	0	2	0
Newport County	Total		30	3	3	2	0	0	1	0	34	5
Shrewsbury Town	2017–18	League One	34	2	0	0	1	0	10 (Note: Seven appearances and one goal in Football League Trophy, three appearances in EFL League One play-offs)	1	45	3
Shrewsbury Town	2018–19	League One	17	1	4	0	1	0	4	1	26	2
Shrewsbury Town	2019–20	League One	2	0	0	0	0	0	2	0	4	0
Shrewsbury Town	Total		53	3	4	0	2	0	16	2	75	5
Hereford	2019–20	National League North	7	3	0	0	0	0	0	0	7	3
Hereford	2020–21	National League North	10	9	0	0	0	0	2	2	12	11
Hereford	Total		17	12	0	0	0	0	2	2	19	14
Grimsby Town	2020–21	League Two	20	4	0	0	0	0	0	0	20	4
Grimsby Town	2021–22	National League	15	1	2	1	0	0	1	0	18	2
Grimsby Town	Total		35	5	2	1	0	0	1	0	38	6
York City (loan)	2021–22	National League North	22	7	0	0	—		0	0	22	7
York City	2022–23	National League	41	14	1	0	—		3	3	45	17
York City	2023–24	National League	17	4	5	2	—		1	1	23	7
York City	Total		80	21	6	2	—		4	4	90	27
Career total			488	91	29	9	7	0	43	12	567	112

== Honours ==
Bury

- Football League Two runner-up: 2010–11

Grimsby Town

- FA Trophy runner-up: 2012–13

Shrewsbury Town

- EFL Trophy runner-up: 2017–18

York City

- National League North play-offs: 2022
