= Steven Schumacher =

English footballer and manager (born 1984)

Personal information
- Full name: Steven Thomas Schumacher
- Date of birth: 30 April 1984 (age 42)
- Place of birth: Liverpool, England
- Position: Midfielder

Team information
- Current team: Bolton Wanderers (head coach)

Youth career
- 2000–2002: Everton

Senior career*
Years	Team	Apps	(Gls)
2002–2004	Everton	0	(0)
2003	→ Carlisle United (loan)	4	(0)
2004	→ Oldham Athletic (loan)	0	(0)
2004–2007	Bradford City	117	(13)
2007–2010	Crewe Alexandra	73	(7)
2010–2013	Bury	114	(23)
2013–2015	Fleetwood Town	64	(5)
2015–2017	Stevenage	43	(7)
2017–2018	Southport	10	(4)
Total		425	(59)

International career
- England U16
- England U19

Managerial career
- 2017: Southport (caretaker)
- 2021–2023: Plymouth Argyle
- 2023–2024: Stoke City
- 2025–: Bolton Wanderers
- * Club domestic league appearances and goals

Steven Thomas Schumacher (born 30 April 1984) is an English football manager and former professional footballer. He is the head coach of EFL Championship club Bolton Wanderers.

He graduated from the youth sides at Everton, and during his playing career his clubs included Bradford City, Crewe Alexandra, Bury, Fleetwood Town, Stevenage and Southport. He also had loan spells early in his career with Carlisle United and Oldham Athletic.

He started his coaching career as caretaker at Southport and later managed Plymouth Argyle. With Plymouth, Schumacher won the League One title in 2022–23. He left for Stoke City in 2023 and then on to Bolton Wanderers in 2025.

== Playing career ==
=== Everton ===
Born in Liverpool, Schumacher attended Cardinal Heenan Catholic High School and began his career at Everton after starting out in apprenticeship there and was captain of the England Under 19s while he was playing in the club's youth team. Along with Wayne Rooney, Schumacher featured in Everton's eight-game run to the 2002 FA Youth Cup.

He was unable to break into the first team, however, and as a result went out to a couple of minor loan spells to get first team experience. Schumacher joined Carlisle United on loan on 31 October 2003. Schumacher spent three months on loan at Carlisle United, where he made four appearances and scored his first career goal against Huddersfield Town in the Football League Trophy.

After his loan spell at Carlisle United came to an end, Schumacher went on trial at Oldham Athletic in February 2004, but was unsuccessful. Schumacher found himself in loan move battle between Bury and Oldham Athletic, but ultimately joined Oldham Athletic on a one-month deal. However, Schumacher made no appearances for the club and returned to his parent club on 6 April 2004, which he later explained his decision, citing lack of first team opportunities.

After his loan spell at Oldham Athletic came to an end, Schumacher played in the reserves for the rest of the season. During a reserve match against Sunderland in April 2004, Schumacher collided with Paul Thirlwell, resulting in Thirlwell being stretchered off. At the end of the 2003–04 season, Schumacher was released by the club. During his time at Everton, he represented both England U16 and England U19.

=== Bradford City ===
After leaving Everton, Schumacher went on trial at Bradford City and impressed the club's management sufficiently that he was offered and signed a two–year contract with the club on 30 July 2004.

Schumacher made his Bradford City debut, where he played 90 minutes, in a 2–1 loss against Hartlepool United in the opening game of the season. He then scored his first Bradford City goal, on 18 September 2004, in a 4–1 win over Bristol City. Since making his Bradford City debut, Schumacher has accrued a reputation as a fiercely competitive midfielder, equally adept in a holding or attacking role. His best season so far was the 2004–05 season, making over 40 first team starts, and scoring freely from his role in the Bantams midfield, scoring five more goals against Tranmere Rovers, Wrexham, Walsall, Stockport County and AFC Bournemouth. Despite suffering injuries along the way, he went on to make forty–six appearances and scoring six times in all competitions.

Ahead of the 2005–06 season, Schumacher signed a two-year contract with Bradford City, keeping him until 2007. He started the season well, appearing in the first three league matches of the season until being sidelined with two separate injuries. Schumacher returned to the starting line–up on 17 September, in a 1–1 draw against Yeovil Town. In a follow–up match against West Bromwich Albion in the third round of the League Cup, he scored his first goal of the season, losing 4–1. Since returning from injuries, Schumacher regained his first team place for the rest of the year. He then scored a 30-yard screamer, in a 1–1 draw against Southend United on 10 December 2005. This lasted until Schumacher suffered a knock in the 41st minute and was substituted, in a 3–3 draw against Brentford on 3 January 2006. As a result, he was sidelined for the rest of January. On 4 February, he returned to the starting line–up against Colchester United and played 76 minutes, as the club lost 3–1. Schumacher later faced further sidelined with injuries and suspension. These restrictions of suspension and injuries combined saw him make thirty–five appearances and scoring two times in all competitions.

In the 2006–07 season, Schumacher regained his first team place at Bradford City, playing in the midfield position. He then scored his first goal of the season, in a 2–0 win over Tranmere Rovers on 30 September 2006. Schumacher's goal scoring form continues, scoring five more goals later in the 2006–07 season against Brighton & Hove Albion, Port Vale, Tranmere Rovers, Brentford and Bristol City. During a match against Chesterfield on 28 April 2007, Schumacher caused controversy when he swore directly to Bradford City. As a result, Schumacher apologised for his action and was fined by the club. After Bradford City's relegation to League Two, Schumacher made forty-four appearances, having missed two games, due to suspension.

Schumacher's Bradford contract expired and he left the club on 18 May 2007, as he was not thought to be in new Bradford City manager Stuart McCall's plans, speculation indicated that he could have been offered a new contract by the club in a change of heart by McCall and owner Julian Rhodes.

=== Crewe Alexandra ===
However, Schumacher soon signed for Crewe Alexandra for a nominal fee a week after leaving Bradford City. Upon joining the club, he was given a number seven shirt ahead of a new season.

Schumacher made his Crewe Alexandra debut in the opening game of the season, playing 90 minutes, in a 2–1 win against Brighton Hove & Albion. Three weeks later on 1 September 2007, he scored his first goal for the club, in a 1–1 draw against Swindon Town. Schumacher became a first team regular in the first two months at Crewe Alexandra until he suffered a hamstring injury that kept him out for three months On 19 January 2008, Schumacher made his first team return from injury, starting the whole game, in a 1–0 loss against Carlisle United. His return was short–lived when he later suffered injuries on two occasions later in the 2007–08 season, but remained on the first team spotlight towards end of the season. At the end of the 2007–08 season, Schumacher made twenty–nine appearances and scoring once in all competitions.

At the start of the 2008–09 season, Schumacher's first team opportunity soon become restricted, as he found his playing time, coming from the substitute bench. Schumacher scored his first goal of the season, in a 4–0 win against Macclesfield Town in the first round of the Football League Trophy. This lasted until he suffered an ankle injury, resulting in him having an operation, and was sidelined for four months. On 21 February 2009 Schumacher made his first team return for Crewe Alexandra, coming on as a substitute in the 86th minute in a 3–1 win over Huddersfield Town. A week later on 28 February 2009, he scored his second goal of the season, in a 4–0 win over Brighton. Two weeks later on 10 March 2009, Schumacher scored his third goal of the season, in a 1–1 draw against Walsall. However, his return was short-lived when he suffered a knee injury during a match against Leeds United and was sidelined between four and six weeks. At the end of the 2008–09 season, Schumacher went on to make nineteen appearances and scoring three times in all competitions.

At the start of the 2009–10 season, Schumacher managed to regain his first team place at Crewe under the management of Dario Gradi despite facing competition from Ashley Westwood. He then scored four more goals by the end of 2009, scoring against Rotherham United, Bradford City, Cheltenham Town and Morecambe. However, Schumacher suffered injuries on four occasions throughout the 2009–10 season. Despite this, he continued to remain in the first team for the club. At the end of the 2009–10 season, Schumacher went on to make 33 appearances and scoring four times in all competitions.

In May 2010, it was announced that he would leave Crewe Alexandra when his contract expired in the summer. He had played 81 times in his three years at the club.

=== Bury ===
Following his release by Crewe Alexandra, Schumacher signed for Bury on 8 July 2010, signing a two-year contract. Shortly after, he was appointed as the new club captain at the club.

Schumacher made his debut for Bury, as well as, captain, against Port Vale and started the whole game, in a 1–0 loss in the opening game of the season. He then started in the next five matches before being sent–off for a second bookable offence, in a 3–0 loss against Crewe Alexandra on 11 September 2010. After serving a one match suspension, Schumacher returned to the starting line–up against Cheltenham Town on 25 September 2010 and helped the club win 2–0. In a follow–up match against Morecambe on 28 September 2010, he scored his first goal of the season, in a 4–1 win. Since returning from suspension, Schumacher regained his first team place for the club. On 16 October 2010 he scored his second goal of the season in a 4–3 win against Torquay United. Schumacher's goalscoring form continued when he scored against Aldershot Town, Shrewsbury Town and Hereford United. His runs in the first team lasted until Schumacher was sent–off for a second bookable offence, in a 0–0 draw against Port Vale on 26 March 2011. After serving a two match suspension, he returned to the first team, coming on as a second-half substitute, in a 1–0 win against Burton Albion on 12 April 2011. Schumacher led Bury to promotion from League Two following a 3–2 win against Chesterfield on 25 April 2011. In the last game of the season, he scored a brace with a 3–3 draw against Stevenage. Despite suffering from injuries during the 2010–11 season, Schumacher finished his first season at the club, making forty–six appearances and scoring nine times in all competitions.

After appearing in the opening game of the 2011–12 season, Schumacher, however, tore his calf muscle during a match against Coventry City in the first round of the League Cup and was substituted in the 31st minute, as Bury won 3–1. Following this, it was announced that he was sidelined for six weeks. After returning to training in late–September, he made his return to the first team on 8 October, coming on as a late substitute in a 2–0 win against Exeter City. Since returning from injury, he regained his first team place in the first team, as well as, his captaincy. Schumacher scored his first goal of the season, in a 4–2 win over Walsall on 19 November 2011. Shortly after, he signed a two-year contract with the club, keeping him until 2014. Schumacher later added five more goals, including a 3–2 brace win against Yeovil Town on 20 January 2012. However, he suffered a hamstring injury that saw him sidelined for three matches due to injury, Schumacher regained his first team place and under his leadership, he helped the club survive relegation, finishing in 14th place. At the end of the 2011–12 season, Schumacher made thirty-four appearances and scoring six times in all competitions.

At the start of the 2012–13 season, Schumacher started the season well when he set up Bury's only goal of the game, in a 2–1 loss against Middlesbrough in the first round of the League Cup. However, Schumacher was sent-off in a 2–1 loss against Doncaster Rovers. After serving a one match suspension, he returned to the starting line–up against Notts County on 1 September 2012, as the club lost 2–0. Since returning from suspension, Schumacher regained his first team place for Bury, playing in either the centre–midfield and attacking midfield positions. He scored his first goal of the season on 13 October 2012 in the second round of the Football League Trophy against Rochdale, which played throughout 120 minutes and scored the winning penalty to go through to the next round. Schumacher later scored six more goals by the end of the year. This also included when he scored in the last minutes in the last sixteen of the Football League Trophy against Preston North End, which played throughout 120 minutes and converted one of the penalty successfully, as Bury lose 5–4 in the penalty shoot-out on 18 December 2012. Schumacher later added three more goals in the second half of the season. However, he suffered hernia injury, which resulted a surgery and kept him sidelined for the rest of this season. By the time Schumacher suffered an injury, he was the club's top scorer with ten goals in forty–four appearances. Without his leadership, Bury struggled and was relegated to League Two, which he described the season as 'frustrating'. Despite this, Schumacher won three awards for the 2012–13 season: Bury Times Player of the season, Forever Bury Player of the Season and Frank Hoult Memorial Player's Player of the season.

However, due to Bury's relegation, as well as financial trouble, his future became increasingly uncertain. As a result, he was linked with a move to Fleetwood Town. But the club rebuffed Fleetwood Town's attempt to sign Schumacher.

=== Fleetwood Town ===
Schumacher signed for Fleetwood Town on 21 May 2013 for an undisclosed fee. His move to Fleetwood Town led to Kevin Blackwell's disappointment, who blamed the club's owner for Schumacher's departure.

Schumacher made his debut for the club, in the opening game of the season, playing 70 minutes, in a 3–1 win over Dagenham & Redbridge. Since making his debut for Fleetwood Town, he established himself in the starting eleven. After spending four matches on the sidelines since the beginning of October, Schumacher returned to the first team against York City on 26 October 2013, starting a match, in a 2–0 win. In a follow–up match against Newport County on 2 November 2013, he scored a hat-trick in a 4–1 victory for Fleetwood Town. Four weeks later on 29 November 2013, Schumacher scored his fourth goal of the season, in a 1–1 draw against Oxford United. His performance throughout November earned him the Sky Bet League 2 Player of the Month Award, but lost out to Zavon Hines. However, he missed two matches following an injury and returned to the starting line–up, in a 3–1 win against Accrington Stanley on 1 January 2014. After spending a month on the substitute bench following an injury, Schumacher returned to the starting line–up against Southend United on 26 April 2014, scoring his fifth goal of the season, a 1–1 draw. Schumacher was involved in two out of three matches in the play-offs, including the final, where he was placed on the substitute bench, as Fleetwood won 1–0 against Burton Albion on 26 May, which won promotion to League One. Despite suffering further setbacks in his first season at Fleetwood Town, Schumacher's first team place was restricted thirty-two appearances and scoring five times in all competitions, due to being on the substitute bench.

At the start of the 2014–15 season, Schumacher managed to regain his first team place, playing in the midfield position. He then provided assist for Gareth Evans, in a 2–0 win over Scunthorpe United on 19 August 2014. Schumacher then provided assist from a corner to lead to Stephen Jordan in early minutes in a 3–2 loss against Preston North End on 25 October 2014. After being suspended for one game due to picking up five yellow cards this season, he returned to the starting line–up and provided assist for Jeff Hughes to score a winning goal and only goal in the game against Yeovil Town. On 11 April 2015, Schumacher captained for Fleetwood Town for the first time, as Fleetwood Town lost 1–0 loss against Walsall. He went on to finish the 2014–15 season, making thirty-three appearances in all competitions. Following this, Schumacher was among fifteen players to be released by Fleetwood Town.

=== Stevenage ===
On 24 June 2015 Schumacher signed for Stevenage on a free transfer. Upon joining the club, he was given a number eight shirt.

Schumacher made his Stevenage debut, in the opening game of the season, in a 2–0 loss against Notts County. He started in the next five matches before missing two matches due to a hamstring injury sustained during a 1–1 draw against Dagenham & Redbridge on 29 August 2015. On 19 September 2015, Schumacher returned to the starting line–up in a 3–2 loss against Barnet. He then regained his first team place, playing in the midfield position since returning from injury. After serving a one match suspension, he scored his first goal for the club in a 2–1 defeat at Northampton Town on 24 October 2015. Two weeks later on 7 November 2015, Schumacher scored his second goal for Stevenage, in a 3–0 win over Gillingham in the first round of FA Cup. Twoeeks later on 24 November 2015, Schumacher scored his third goal of the season, in a 2–1 win over Bristol Rovers. However, during the match, he tore his anterior cruciate ligament, resulting in him being sidelined for nine months, therefore missing the remainder of the 2015–16 season. By the time he suffered an injury, Schumacher finished the season, making eighteen appearances and scoring three times in all competitions.

By May, Schumacher finished making recovery from his injury and began training. However, he continued to remain out of the first team, due to competitions, resulting in him being placed on the substitute bench. On 4 October, he returned to the starting line–up against Brighton & Hove Albion U23 in the EFL Trophy, and played 61 minutes before being substituted, as Stevenage lost 4–3 in the penalty shootout following a 2–2 draw. By November, he began to receive a number of first team runs for the club. Schumacher scored his first goal of the season, as well as, setting up Stevenage's second goal of the game, in a 4–0 win against Southend United in the EFL Trophy. Three weeks later on 26 November 2016, he scored his second goal of the season, in a 2–1 win against Portsmouth. A month later, Schumacher set up two goals in two matches between 26 December 2016 and 31 December 2016 against Cambridge United and Colchester United. He then scored his third goal of the season, in a 4–2 loss against Plymouth Argyle on 14 January 2017. Schumacher added two more goals in the next six matches before setting up the club's opening goal of the game, in a 1–1 draw against Exeter City on 18 February 2017. However, he suffered an injury that kept him out for two matches. Schumacher returned to the starting line–up against Notts County on 4 March 2017 and set up Stevenage's first goal of the game, in a 3–0 win. In a follow–up match against Luton Town, he set up the club's first goal of the game, in a 2–0 win. A month later on 17 April 2017, Schumacher scored his sixth goal of the season, in a 1–1 draw against Carlisle United. At the end of the 2016–17 season, Schumacher went on to make thirty appearances and scoring six times in all competitions. It was announced on 29 June 2017 that he was released by the club.

=== Southport ===
In July 2017, Schumacher joined Southport after being released by Stevenage. He made his Southport debut in the opening game of the season against Boston United and scored his first goal for the club, in a 4–0 win. Schumacher then appeared in a number of matches, as he fight for his first team place, and went on to make ten appearances in all competitions. He went on to score three more goals for Southport. After being placed by the club on a transfer list, Schumacher was released by Southport in January, having spent six months at the club.

== Coaching career ==
Following his release by Stevenage, Schumacher took a coaching job at Everton and was once an interim manager at Southport. On 19 January 2018, Schumacher returned to Bury as first team coach, assisting caretaker-manager Ryan Lowe. Upon Lowe's appointment as permanent manager, Schumacher remained in his role. As a result, he quietly announced his retirement from professional football. At the end of the 2018–19 season, Schumacher's contributions helped Bury gain promotion back to League One despite the financial turmoil surrounding the club, a winding-up petition pending and players and staff being paid late or not at all.

=== Plymouth Argyle ===
On 5 June 2019, Lowe brought Schumacher with him upon leaving Bury to become Plymouth Argyle manager, with Schumacher appointed as his assistant manager. By the time he joined the club, Schumacher only just received his UEFA Pro License A. Together with Lowe, Schumacher's contributions helped Plymouth Argyle to a third-place finish and an immediate return to League One in a season interrupted by the COVID-19 pandemic in the United Kingdom.

On 7 December 2021, following the departure of Lowe in order to take a job at Preston North End, Schumacher was swiftly appointed manager of Plymouth Argyle. A day later, his first match ended in a 1–1 draw against Milton Keynes Dons. In just his tenth match as a manager, Schumacher took charge of Argyle as they narrowly lost 2–1 in extra time in the FA Cup fourth round to reigning European Champions Chelsea. Argyle's fine early form under Schumacher saw the club record six straight wins in March 2022 without conceding a single goal, the best defensive record at the club since 2005. This impressive run of form saw Schumacher awarded the EFL League One Manager of the Month award for March. The season ultimately ended in disappointment as a 5–0 home defeat to Milton Keynes Dons on the final day of the season saw Plymouth drop out of the play-off places.

An impressive start to the 2022–23 season saw Plymouth sitting top of the league at the end of September. Having won three out of four of the matches, including a victory over fellow promotion hopefuls Ipswich Town, Schumacher was awarded the Manager of the Month award for September. Schumacher won the award for a second consecutive month after another unbeaten month that kept Plymouth top of the league. Schumacher led Plymouth to the EFL Trophy final but lost 4–0 to Bolton Wanderers. At the end of April, Plymouth secured promotion to the Championship after 13 years away. A week later, Plymouth secured the League One title on the final day of the season with a 3–1 victory away at Port Vale, winning 101 points in total. He was also named as the League One Manager of the Year.

=== Stoke City ===
On 19 December 2023, Schumacher was appointed head coach at Championship club Stoke City on a three-and-a-half-year contract. He was also joined by his coaching staff of Darren Behcet, Peter Cavanagh and Mark Hughes. His first match in charge was a goalless draw against Millwall on 23 December 2023. Stoke secured Championship survival in 2023–24, finishing 17th. On 16 September 2024, after two wins from the first five games of the 2024–25 season, Schumacher was dismissed.

=== Bolton Wanderers ===
On 30 January 2025, Schumacher was appointed head coach of League One club Bolton Wanderers on a three-and-a-half year contract. Schumacher would see out the remainder of a turbulent and disappointing 2024–25 season campaign for Bolton, with the highlight of the season being a stoppage time winner from centre-back Chris Forino to win 1–0 away at local rivals Wigan on 1 April 2025, ending a 10-year wait for Bolton to win the derby. The 2025–26 season season culminated in a 4–1 victory over Stockport County in the 2026 EFL League One play-off final at Wembley on 24 May, returning Bolton to the Championship for the first time since 2019.

== Personal life ==
Schumacher is good friends with Peter Sweeney as they have known each other since they were fifteen. Schumacher has qualified for the UEFA B Licence and later the UEFA A License. He also has a BA Honours Degree in Professional Sports Journalism and Broadcasting, from Staffordshire University.

In September 2011, Schumacher became a father when his partner gave birth to a baby girl, Claudia.

== Career statistics ==
Appearances and goals by club, season and competition
Club	Season	League			FA Cup		League Cup		Other		Total	
Club	Season	Division	Apps	Goals	Apps	Goals	Apps	Goals	Apps	Goals	Apps	Goals
Everton	2003–04	Premier League	0	0	0	0	0	0	0	0	0	0
Carlisle United (loan)	2003–04	Third Division	4	0	1	0	0	0	1 (Note: Appearances in EFL Trophy.)	1	6	1
Oldham Athletic (loan)	2003–04	Second Division	0	0	0	0	0	0	0	0	0	0
Bradford City	2004–05	League One	43	6	1	0	1	0	1	0	46	6
Bradford City	2005–06	League One	30	1	3	0	1	1	1	0	35	2
Bradford City	2006–07	League One	44	6	3	1	1	0	1	0	49	7
Bradford City	Total		117	13	7	1	3	1	3	0	130	15
Crewe Alexandra	2007–08	League One	26	1	1	0	1	0	1	0	29	1
Crewe Alexandra	2008–09	League One	15	2	0	0	2	0	2	1	19	3
Crewe Alexandra	2009–10	League Two	32	4	0	0	0	0	1	0	33	4
Crewe Alexandra	Total		73	7	1	0	3	0	4	1	81	8
Bury	2010–11	League Two	43	9	1	0	1	0	1	0	46	9
Bury	2011–12	League One	32	6	1	0	1	0	0	0	34	6
Bury	2012–13	League One	39	8	2	0	1	0	2	2	44	10
Bury	Total		114	23	4	0	3	0	3	2	124	25
Fleetwood Town	2013–14	League Two	32	5	2	0	0	0	5 (Note: Three appearances in EFL Trophy; two in EFL League Two play-offs.)	0	39	5
Fleetwood Town	2014–15	League One	32	0	1	0	0	0	0	0	33	0
Fleetwood Town	Total		64	5	3	0	0	0	5	0	72	5
Stevenage	2015–16	League Two	15	2	1	1	1	0	1	0	18	3
Stevenage	2016–17	League Two	28	5	0	0	0	0	2	1	30	6
Stevenage	Total		43	7	1	1	1	0	3	1	48	9
Southport	2017–18	National League North	10	4	0	0	—		0	0	10	4
Career total			425	59	17	2	10	1	19	5	471	67

== Managerial statistics ==
As of matches played 21 November 2026

Managerial record by team and tenure
Team	From	To	Record					Ref.
Team	From	To	P	W	D	L	Win %	Ref.
Southport (caretaker)	26 September 2017	16 October 2017	2	0	0	2	0.0	
Plymouth Argyle	7 December 2021	19 December 2023	108	57	21	30	52.8	
Stoke City	19 December 2023	16 September 2024	32	13	6	13	40.6	
Bolton Wanderers	30 January 2025	Present	93	39	25	29	41.9	
Total			235	110	52	73	46.8	

== Honours ==
=== Player ===
Bury

- Football League Two second-place promotion: 2010–11

Fleetwood Town

- Football League Two play-offs: 2014

=== Manager ===
Plymouth Argyle

- EFL League One: 2022–23
- EFL Trophy runner-up: 2022–23

Bolton Wanderers

- EFL League One play-offs: 2026

Individual

- EFL League One Manager of the Season: 2022–23
- EFL League One Manager of the Month: March 2022, September 2022, October 2022
