= List of North Queensland United FC seasons =

Northern Fury FC is an association football club based in Townsville, Queensland, Australia. The club was formed in 2009 as one of two expansion teams to the A-League (along with Gold Coast United).

The club folded at the end of the 2010–11 A-League season before being revived in the National Premier Leagues Queensland competition in 2013.

== Key ==
Key to league competitions:

- A-League (A-League) – Australia's top football league, established in 2005.
- National Premier Leagues Queensland (NPL Queensland) – The first tier of football in Queensland.

Key to colours and symbols:

1st or W	Winners
2nd or RU	Runners-up
3rd	Third place
♦	Top scorer in division

Key to league record:

- Season = The year and article of the season
- Pos = Final position
- Pld = Matches played
- W = Matches won
- D = Matches drawn
- L = Matches lost
- GF = Goals scored
- GA = Goals against
- Pts = Points

Key to cup record:

- En-dash (–) = North Queensland United did not participate
- R1 = First round
- R2 = Second round, etc.
- QF = Quarter-finals
- SF = Semi-finals
- RU = Runners-up
- W = Winners

== Seasons ==
Results of league and cup competitions by season
Season	Division	Pld	W	D	L	GF	GA	Pts	Pos	Finals	FFA Cup	Name(s)	Goals
Season	League									Finals	FFA Cup	Top goalscorer(s)	
2009–10	A-League	27	8	8	11	29	46	32	7th	DNQ	—	Robbie Fowler	9
2010–11	A-League	30	4	7	19	28	60	19	10th	DNQ	—	Mark Hughes; David Williams	5
2013	NPL Queensland	22	9	5	8	48	43	32	7th	DNQ	—	Alex Read	11
2014	NPL Queensland	24	6	4	14	38	50	22	11th	DNQ	PR5	Braedyn Crowley	17
2015	NPL Queensland	22	10	1	11	42	44	31	8th	DNQ	PR6	Joseph Thornton	7
2016	NPL Queensland	22	0	4	18	22	73	4	12th	DNQ	PR6	Jonathon Bagley	4
2017	NPL Queensland	22	7	4	11	36	55	25	8th	DNQ	PR6	Jarrod Green	10
2018	NPL Queensland	26	6	1	19	35	71	19	13th	DNQ	PR6	Corey Waples	6
