= Shane Byrne (footballer) =

Irish footballer (born 1993)

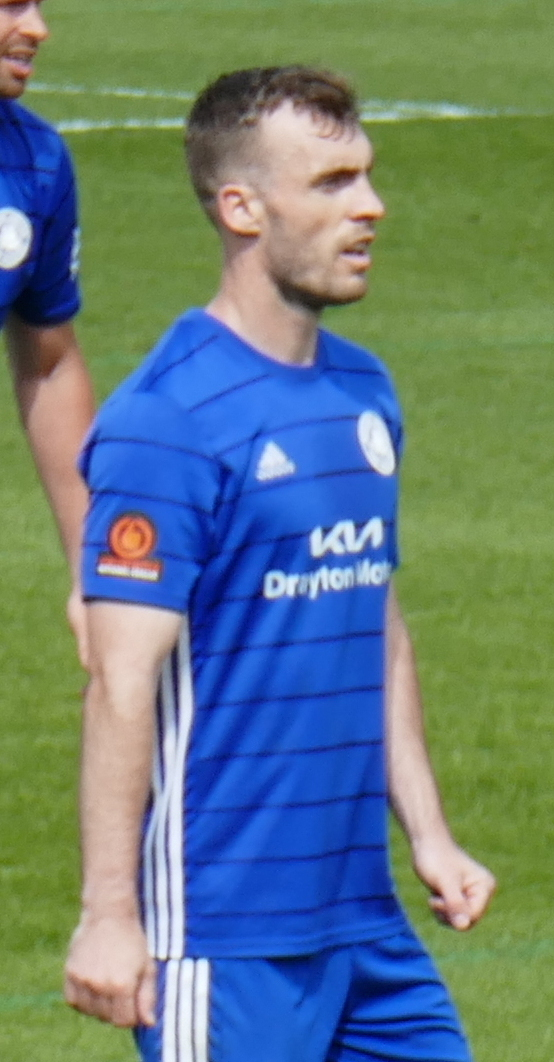
- Byrne playing for Boston United in 2022

Personal information
- Full name: Shane William Byrne
- Date of birth: 25 April 1993 (age 33)
- Place of birth: Dublin, Ireland
- Position: Midfielder

Team information
- Current team: Brackley Town

Youth career
- 2009–2011: Leicester City

Senior career*
Years	Team	Apps	(Gls)
2011–2012	Leicester City	0	(0)
2011–2012	→ Bury (loan)	14	(0)
2012–2013	Bury	3	(0)
2014	Bray Wanderers	10	(2)
2014–2015	Corby Town	50	(5)
2015–2016	Nuneaton Town	52	(6)
2016–2021	Brackley Town	223	(37)
2021–2022	Boston United	52	(5)
2022–2024	Kidderminster Harriers	57	(3)
2024–2026	Brackley Town	0	(0)

International career
2011	Republic of Ireland U17	2	(0)
2011	Republic of Ireland U19	2	(0)
- * Club domestic league appearances and goals as of 2 April 2024

Shane William Byrne (born 25 April 1993) is an Irish professional footballer who usually plays as a central midfielder for National League North club Brackley Town. Byrne has also represented the Republic of Ireland U17 and Republic of Ireland U19 teams.

== Career ==
=== Leicester City ===
Byrne started his career at Leicester City and was part of the youth team that reached the quarter-finals of the FA Youth Cup in the 2010–11 season. On the international transfer deadline day in 2011 Byrne withdrew from the Republic of Ireland U19 squad in order to move on loan to Bury.

=== Bury (loan) ===
In August 2011 Byrne moved on loan to Bury for an initial 3 months. Byrne made his professional début for the club against Sheffield United on 3 September 2011. In October he had his loan extended. He made his F.A. Cup debut on 12 November in a 2–0 defeat to Crawley Town. On 28 December Byrne signed the loan papers to extend his loan at Bury until the end of January. His time at Bury was curtailed after picking up an ankle injury at Colchester United on 10 December 2011.

Bury confirmed on 14 August 2013 that Byrne had been released from his contract by mutual consent.

=== Bray Wanderers ===
In 2014 Byrne announced that he was released from his contract by mutual consent. A few weeks later it was announced that he had returned to Ireland to join an Irish club Bray Wanderers for an undisclosed fee.

=== Corby Town ===
Byrne joined Corby Town in August 2014. He made his Corby Town debut in a pre-season friendly victory over a Nottingham Forest XI, however was made to wait for international clearance before his maiden competitive outing against Cirencester Town.

=== Nuneaton Town ===
On 23 June 2015 Byrne joined Nuneaton Town. Due to contractual issues, Byrne left the club at the end of the 2015–2016 season.

=== Brackley Town ===
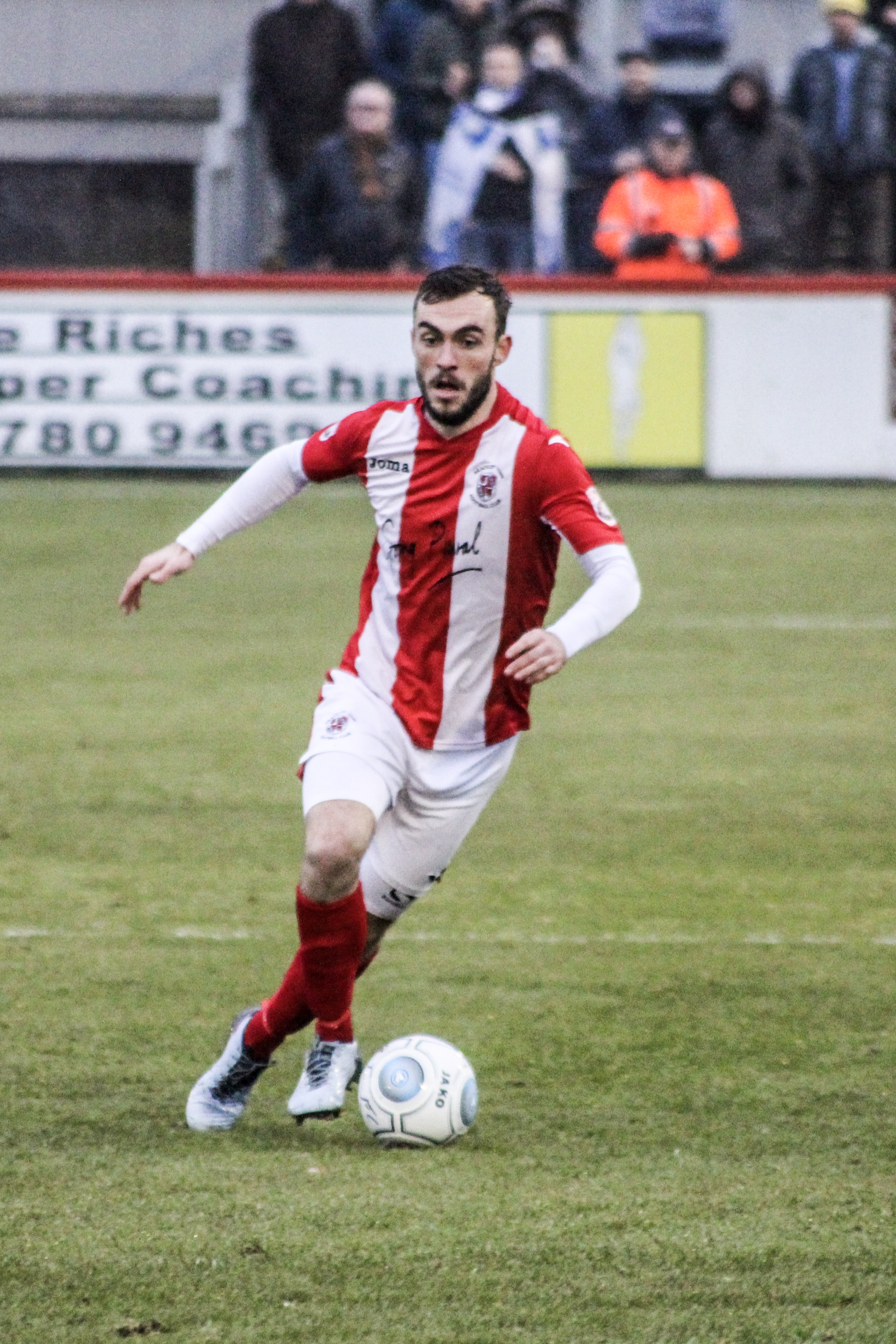
Byrne playing for Brackley Town in 2017

He moved to Brackley Town for the 2016–17 season. On 20 May 2018 he won the Fa trophy at Wembley.

=== Boston United ===
On 20 June 2021, Byrne signed for Boston United Byrne went on to play 52 times that season and was named in the National League North Team of the Season.

=== Kidderminster Harriers ===
On 4 July 2022, Byrne joined Kidderminster Harriers having defeated his new club the previous season in the play-offs. He captained the side to promotion to the National League.

=== Brackley Town (return) ===
On 20 June 2024, Brackley Town announced Shane Byrne had agreed on a return to the club following the expiry of his contract with Kidderminster. After making 315 appearances and scoring 46 goals across his two spells, Brackley announced Byrne would depart the club at the end of his contract.

== International career ==
=== Republic of Ireland U17 ===
Byrne has represented the Republic of Ireland at U-17 on two occasions.

=== Republic of Ireland U19 ===
On 10 February 2011 he made his debut for the Republic of Ireland national under-19 football team against Croatia. Byrne was called up by the U19s to face a double header against Slovenia in October 2011 but withdrew in order to extend his loan at Bury.

== Career statistics ==
As of 2 April 2024

Appearances and goals by club, season and competition
Club	Season	League			FA Cup		League Cup		Other		Total	
Club	Season	Division	Apps	Goals	Apps	Goals	Apps	Goals	Apps	Goals	Apps	Goals
Bury (loan)	2011–12	League One	14	0	1	0	0	0	0	0	15	0
Bury	2012–13	League One	3	0	0	0	0	0	1 (Note: Appearance in the Football League Trophy)	0	4	0
Bray Wanderers	2014	Irish Premier Division	10	0	0	0	2	2	0	0	12	2
Corby Town	2014–15	SFL - Premier Division	40	5	2	0	—		5 (Note: One appearance in the Northamptonshire Senior Cup and four in the Southern League Cup)	0	47	5
Nuneaton Town	2015–16	National League North	40	6	2	0	—		4 (Note: One appearance in the FA Trophy and four in the Birmingham Senior Cup)	0	46	6
Brackley Town	2016–17	National League North	40	3	4	0	—		4 (Note: Appearances in the FA Trophy)	0	48	3
Brackley Town	2017–18	National League North	44	4	2	1	—		10	3	56	8
Brackley Town	2018–19	National League North	43	9	0	0	—		4	1	47	10
Brackley Town	2019–20	National League North	34	7	1	0	—		0	0	35	7
Brackley Town	2020–21	National League North	14	6	4	0	—		2	1	20	7
Brackley Town	Total		175	29	11	1	—		20	5	206	33
Boston United	2021–22	National League North	41	4	3	0	—		6 (Note: Three appearances in National League North play-offs and three appearances, one goal in FA Trophy)	1	50	5
Kidderminster Harriers	2022–23	National League North	43	3	0	0	—		0	0	43	3
Kidderminster Harriers	2023–24	National League	14	0	0	0	—		0	0	14	0
Kidderminster Harriers	Total		57	3	0	0	—		0	0	57	3
Career total			423	50	19	1	2	2	36	6	480	57

== Honours ==
Corby Town

Southern League Premier Division winners 2014–15 http://www.englishfootballstats.co.uk/Non-League%20Tables/Southern%20Football%20League/Combined%20Tables/2014-15.htm

Brackley Town

- FA Trophy: 2017–18
- National League North play-offs:
  - Runners-up: 2022-23
- National League North: 2024–25
