= Luke McCarthy =

English footballer

Personal information
- Full name: Luke Joseph McCarthy
- Date of birth: 7 July 1993 (age 33)
- Place of birth: Bolton, England
- Position: Midfielder

Youth career
- Manchester City
- 2009–2011: Bury

Senior career*
Years	Team	Apps	(Gls)
2011–2013	Bury	1	(0)
2011–2012	→ Grimsby Town (loan)	5	(0)
2013	Airbus UK Broughton		
2013	Salford City		
2013–2014	Droylsden		
2014–2015	Mossley		
- * Club domestic league appearances and goals as of 14:07, 28 January 2012 (UTC)

Luke Joseph McCarthy (born 7 July 1993) is an English former footballer who played as a midfielder.

He has previously played for Manchester City, Grimsby Town and Bury, Salford City, Airbus UK Broughton and Droylsden.

== Playing career ==
McCarthy made his debut for Bury on the final day of the club's 2010–11 season coming on as a 92nd-minute substitute against Stevenage.

He signed a new 12-month contract with Bury in June 2011.

On 24 November 2011, he joined Grimsby Town on an initial one-month loan.

In May 2012, he was offered a new contract by Bury. He was released in January 2013. McCarthy went on to play for Salford City, Airbus UK Broughton, Droylsden and Mossley.

== Career statistics ==
As of 11 December 2012

Club	Season	League			FA Cup		League Cup		Other^{[A]}		Total	
Club	Season	Division	Apps	Goals	Apps	Goals	Apps	Goals	Apps	Goals	Apps	Goals
Bury	2009–10	League Two	0	0	0	0	0	0	0	0	0	0
Bury	2010–11	League Two	1	0	0	0	0	0	0	0	1	0
Bury	2011–12	League One	0	0	0	0	1	0	1	0	2	0
Bury	2012–13	League One	0	0	0	0	0	0	0	0	0	0
Grimsby Town (loan)	2011–12	Conference	5	0	1	0	0	0	0	0	6	0
Bury Total			1	0	0	0	1	0	1	0	3	0
Career totals			6	0	1	0	1	0	1	0	9	0

A. The "Other" column constitutes appearances (including substitutes) and goals in the Football League Trophy.
