= Mark Hughes (footballer, born 1986) =

English footballer

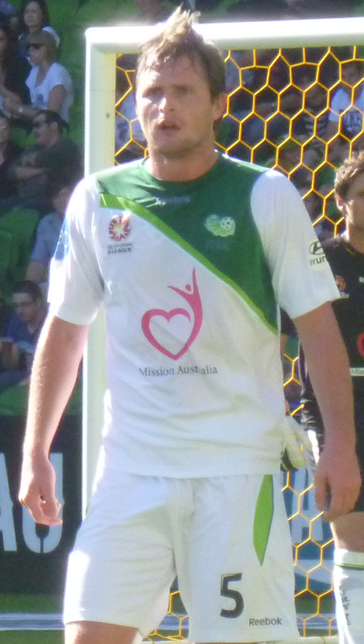
- Hughes playing for North Queensland Fury in 2011

Personal information
- Full name: Mark Anthony Hughes
- Date of birth: 9 December 1986 (age 39)
- Place of birth: Kirkby, England
- Height: 6 ft 2 in (1.88 m)
- Position: Defender

Team information
- Current team: Bolton Wanderers (assistant coach)

Youth career
- 1994–2004: Everton

Senior career*
Years	Team	Apps	(Gls)
2004–2007	Everton	1	(0)
2006	→ Stockport County (loan)	3	(0)
2007–2009	Northampton Town	93	(4)
2009–2010	Walsall	26	(1)
2010–2011	North Queensland Fury	30	(4)
2011–2012	Bury	24	(0)
2013	→ Accrington Stanley (loan)	5	(0)
2013–2015	Morecambe	84	(8)
2015–2016	Stevenage	20	(1)
2016–2021	Accrington Stanley	210	(9)
2021–2022	Bristol Rovers	6	(0)
2024–2025	Clitheroe	14	(0)
Total		538	(26)
- * Club domestic league appearances and goals as of 18:29, 31 January 2025 (UTC)

Mark Anthony Hughes (born 9 December 1986) is an English former professional footballer who is assistant coach at EFL Championship club Bolton Wanderers.

An Everton academy graduate, Hughes also played for Northampton Town, Walsall, North Queensland Fury, Bury and Morecambe.

== Career ==
=== Early senior career ===
Born in Liverpool, he joined Everton at the age of seven and progressed to the rank of reserve team captain. During his time at Everton, he spent a period in 2006 out on loan at Stockport County in League Two. He signed a new 1-year deal with Everton in April 2006 to keep him at the club until the summer of 2007.

He was a regular captain for the reserves team and made three appearances in the Everton first team. He started in the Football League Cup game against Peterborough United on 20 September 2006 which Everton won 2–1, and came on as a substitute at half time against Luton Town in the following League Cup match which Everton won 4–0, as well as making his Premier League debut on 3 December 2006, being substituted on in the final minutes of a 2–0 victory over West Ham United at Goodison Park.

He moved to Northampton Town on 31 January 2007 for an undisclosed fee and signed a two-year contract. He became a first choice centreback under Stuart Gray, and scored his first goal for the club against Rotherham United on 24 March.

In June 2009 he did not take up an offer of a new contract with Northampton Town. On 8 July, Hughes signed for League One club Walsall on a free transfer. He scored his first goal for the club in a 3–2 win at Wycombe Wanderers on 31 October 2009.

He was offered a new contract by Walsall on 10 May 2010.

=== North Queensland Fury ===
In June 2010, Hughes signed a contract with North Queensland Fury in the Australian A-League. The move came as a surprise, after signing contract acceptance forms with Walsall just one month earlier. He was given a role in the leadership group at the Fury upon arrival.

"The decision to come and play in Australia has been life-changing for me. I believe I've improved as a footballer and grown as a man."

— Mark Hughes, speaking at the North Queensland Fury awards night on 18 February 2011.

Hughes quickly made a name for himself in the A-League, having to turn down contracts offered by several other A-League clubs midway through the season, including Sydney FC. In total, he scored four goals for the season including one penalty. He went on to be named the Fury's best player of the season at the club's awards night, in addition to receiving the People's Choice Award and the Player's Player Award.

Hughes returned to England after North Queensland Fury ceased operations, and joined newly promoted League One club Bury, having to turn down an offer from A-League club Newcastle Jets.

=== Bury ===
Hughes signed a two-year contract with Bury on 21 June 2011, subject to a medical and international clearing. This made him new manager Richie Barker's first signing for the club. Hughes scored his first goal for Bury in the opening game of his second season at the club on 12 August 2012, where Bury suffered a 2–1 defeat to Middlesbrough in the League Cup.

Despite being a regular starter for Bury in the 2012–13 season, Hughes was loaned out to League Two side Accrington Stanley on 31 January 2013 for the remainder of the season. He made just five appearances for Accrington before returning to Bury early, after suffering a calf injury.

Hughes was released by Bury at the end of the 2012–13 season, along with fifteen other players, following the club's relegation to League Two. He made a total of 60 appearances for Bury in his two seasons at the club.

=== Morecambe ===
Following his release from Bury, Hughes signed a two-year deal with League Two club Morecambe on 9 July 2013, and was named as the new club captain on arrival. He was then released by Morecambe on 7 May 2015.

=== Stevenage ===
Following the release from Morecambe, Mark Hughes signed for Stevenage on 27 May 2015. He was Teddy Sheringham's first summer signing. Hughes' first goal for the club was a late equaliser in a 2–2 draw with Newport County on 15 August 2015.

=== Accrington Stanley ===
On 29 January 2016, Hughes re-joined Accrington Stanley following his release from Stevenage, signing a short-term contract until the end of the season with the club he had spent time on loan at three years prior. On 30 April 2016, in the penultimate match of the season, Hughes scored his first goal for the club with a 78th-minute winner over Wycombe Wanderers that saw Accrington remain in second place, two points clear of fourth place. The season ultimately ended poorly for Accrington as, despite hitting the woodwork three times, they were held to a 0–0 draw by Stevenage on the final day of the season, with a 92nd-minute winner from Bristol Rovers' defender Lee Brown seeing Rovers sneak above Accrington into the third and final automatic promotion place, consigning Accrington to the play-offs. Hughes featured in both of the play-off semi final matches as Accrington lost 3–2 on aggregate to AFC Wimbledon.

Hughes was a part of the Accrington side that won the 2017–18 League Two title, featuring in all 46 league matches. Promotion to the third tier for the first time in the club's history was confirmed on 17 April 2018 when a double from Billy Kee saw Accrington defeat Yeovil Town. The title was confirmed on the penultimate day of the season with a 1–0 victory over Lincoln City. Hughes was rewarded for his efforts over the season with a place in the PFA League Two Team of the Year, along with two of his teammates, Sean McConville and Billy Kee. At the end of the season the club exercised a contractual option to retain him.

In July 2019, Hughes signed a new one-year contract extension with the club having the option for a second year to keep him until the end of the 2020–21 season.

On 27 March 2021, Hughes was forced off through injury in the 31' minute of what turned out to be his final appearance in an Accrington shirt, a 7–0 defeat to Peterborough United. Until this injury, Hughes had played every minute of the season. Hughes was offered a new contract with the club at the end of the 2020–21 season.

=== Bristol Rovers ===
On 26 May 2021, Hughes signed a one-year deal with League Two side Bristol Rovers, the side that had narrowly beaten Accrington to promotion five years previously. He opted against signing the contract extension. Hughes made his debut for the club on the opening day of the 2021–22 season, giving away a 96th-minute penalty for a foul on Oliver Hawkins that was converted by Danny Johnson to give Mansfield Town a 2–1 victory. Hughes picked up an Achilles injury in September 2021 in training that saw him out of action for the remainder of his time with the club, taking up a coaching role at times.

=== Clitheroe ===
On 23 September 2024, Hughes came out of retirement to join Northern Premier League Division One West club Clitheroe on a non-contract basis.

== Coaching career ==
On 6 January 2022, Hughes joined the backroom staff of former Everton teammate Steven Schumacher by in the role of First Team Coach at Plymouth Argyle. Hughes became assistant manager in May 2022 following the departure of Keith Downing. Hughes followed Schumacher to Stoke City in December 2023. He left Stoke in September 2024. He rejoined Schumacher's coaching staff on his appointment as Bolton Wanderers head coach in January 2025.

== Career statistics ==
Appearances and goals by club, season and competition
Club	Season	League			FA Cup		League Cup		Other		Total	
Club	Season	Division	Apps	Goals	Apps	Goals	Apps	Goals	Apps	Goals	Apps	Goals
Stockport County	2005–06	League Two	3	0	0	0	0	0	0	0	3	0
Everton	2006–07	Premier League	1	0	0	0	2	0	—		3	0
Northampton Town	2006–07	League One	17	2	0	0	0	0	0	0	17	2
Northampton Town	2007–08	League One	35	1	4	0	2	0	1 (Note: Appearance(s) in Football League Trophy)	0	42	1
Northampton Town	2008–09	League One	41	1	2	0	3	0	1	0	47	1
Northampton Town	Total		93	4	6	0	5	0	2	0	106	4
Walsall	2009–10	League One	26	1	2	0	0	0	0	0	28	1
North Queensland Fury	2010–11	A-League	30	4	—		—		—		30	4
Bury	2011–12	League One	25	0	1	0	1	0	0	0	27	0
Bury	2012–13	League One	27	0	3	0	1	1	2	0	33	1
Bury	Total		52	0	4	0	2	1	2	0	60	1
Accrington Stanley	2012–13	League Two	5	0	0	0	0	0	0	0	5	0
Morecambe	2013–14	League Two	44	5	0	0	2	0	1	0	47	5
Morecambe	2014–15	League Two	34	2	0	0	1	0	1	0	36	2
Morecambe	Total		78	7	0	0	3	0	2	0	83	7
Stevenage	2015–16	League Two	20	1	1	0	0	0	1	0	22	0
Accrington Stanley	2015–16	League Two	15	1	0	0	0	0	2 (Note: Appearance(s) in EFL League Two play-offs)	0	17	1
Accrington Stanley	2016–17	League Two	36	2	4	0	3	0	2 (Note: Appearance(s) in EFL Trophy)	0	45	2
Accrington Stanley	2017–18	League Two	46	4	2	0	2	0	1	0	51	4
Accrington Stanley	2018–19	League One	46	1	4	0	1	0	1	0	52	1
Accrington Stanley	2019–20	League One	31	1	1	0	1	0	2	0	35	1
Accrington Stanley	2020–21	League One	36	0	1	0	1	0	3	0	41	0
Accrington Stanley	Total		210	9	12	0	8	0	11	0	241	9
Bristol Rovers	2021–22	League Two	6	0	0	0	0	0	0	0	6	0
Clitheroe	2024–25	NPL Division One West	14	0	0	0	—		2 (Note: Appearance(s) in FA Trophy)	0	16	0
Career total			538	26	25	0	20	1	20	0	603	27

== Honours ==
Accrington Stanley

- EFL League Two: 2017–18

Individual

- PFA Team of the Year: 2017–18 League Two
