= Andrai Jones =

English footballer

Personal information
- Full name: Andrai Ricardo Jones
- Date of birth: 1 January 1992 (age 34)
- Place of birth: Liverpool, England
- Position: Midfielder

Youth career
- Everton
- Preston North End
- ?–2010: Bury

Senior career*
Years	Team	Apps	(Gls)
2010–2013	Bury	19	(0)
2010	→ Altrincham (loan)	1	(0)
2013–2014	Barnsley	2	(0)
2013	→ Tranmere Rovers (loan)	2	(0)
2014	→ Alfreton Town (loan)	10	(0)
2014–2015	Gateshead	20	(0)
2015–2017	Southport	64	(5)
2017–2018	Bala Town	17	(0)
2018–2019	Stafford Rangers	0	(0)
2019–2020	Guiseley	19	(2)
2020	Hereford	3	(0)
2020	Guiseley	8	(0)
- * Club domestic league appearances and goals as of 17:46, 10 May 2022 (UTC)

Andrai Ricardo Jones (born 1 January 1992) is an English footballer.

== Career ==
Born in Liverpool, Jones began his career playing for youth side Kingsley United Football Club in Toxteth, Liverpool. Having previously been part of the youth system at Everton and Preston North End, he joined Bury's youth set-up. He joined the first team squad for the 2010/11 season. In September 2010 he went on loan at Altrincham for a month where he played one game for the club on 28 September in a 3–3 draw against Kettering.

He made his Football League debut as a 93rd-minute substitute in a match with Northampton Town on 9 April 2011. In May 2011 he was offered a new contract by the club. He signed a new 12-month contract with Bury in June 2011. On 31 January 2013, Jones completed a free transfer to Barnsley signing an 18-month contract with the Championship side. He made his debut as a substitute on 16 April 2013, replacing Bobby Hassell, in a 1–1 draw against Derby County. In August 2013, he joined League One side Tranmere Rovers on a month-long loan. He made his debut for the club as a first-half substitute in a 2–1 away defeat at Crewe Alexandra on 17 August. He was released by Barnsley at the end of the 2013/14 season and signed a contract with Gateshead on 30 June 2014. His Gateshead debut came on 12 August 2014 against Wrexham. Jones was released at the end of the season and signed a two-year deal with Southport in July 2015. Jones was sent off on his Southport debut against Eastleigh on 8 August 2015.

On 10 July 2017, Jones joined Welsh Premier League side Bala Town. He was released in June 2018.

In October 2018, Jones signed for Stafford Rangers.

On 1 December 2020, Jones rejoined Guiseley.

== Personal life ==
Jones founded a company offering UV football, involving a glow in the dark kit, ball and pitch.

== Career statistics ==
As of 31 August 2015.

Club	Season	League		FA Cup		League Cup		Other		Total	
Club	Season	Apps	Goals	Apps	Goals	Apps	Goals	Apps	Goals	Apps	Goals
Bury	2010–11	0	0	0	0	0	0	0	0	0	0
Altrincham (loan)	2010–11	1	0	0	0	0	0	0	0	1	0
Bury	2011–12	9	0	0	0	1	0	0	0	10	0
Bury	2012–13	10	0	0	0	1	0	0	0	11	0
Barnsley	2012–13	2	0	0	0	0	0	0	0	2	0
Barnsley	2013–14	0	0	0	0	0	0	0	0	0	0
Tranmere Rovers (loan)	2013–14	2	0	0	0	0	0	1	0	3	0
Alfreton Town (loan)	2013–14	10	0	0	0	0	0	0	0	10	0
Gateshead	2014–15	20	0	2	0	0	0	3	0	25	0
Southport	2015–16	23	0	0	0	0	0	0	0	3	0
Career total		57	0	2	0	2	0	4	0	65	0
