= List of New Zealand Knights FC players =

New Zealand Knights Football Club was a New Zealand professional football club based in Auckland. The club was formed in 2004, and played their first competitive match in July 2005 when they participated in the 2005 A-League Pre-Season Challenge Cup. The club played its home matches at North Harbour Stadium. The Knights was dissolved in 2007, following two seasons of football.

New Zealand Knights' record appearance-maker was Darren Bazeley, with 47 appearances over 2 seasons, ahead of Noah Hickey with 43.

== List of players ==
- Appearances and goals are for first-team competitive matches only, including A-League and Pre-Season Challenge Cup matches.
- Players are listed according to the date of their first team debut for the club.

Table headers

- Nationality – If a player played international football, the country/countries he played for are shown. Otherwise, the player's nationality is given as their country of birth.
- New Zealand Knights career – The year of the player's first appearance for New Zealand Knights to the year of his last appearance.
- Starts – The number of games started.
- Sub – The number of games played as a substitute.
- Total – The total number of games played, both as a starter and as a substitute.

Position key
GK	Goalkeeper
DF	Defender
MF	Midfielder
FW	Forward
U	Utility player^{1}

List of New Zealand Knights FC players
Name	Nationality	Position	New Zealand Knights career	Starts	Subs	Total	Goals	Ref
Name	Nationality	Position	New Zealand Knights career	Appearances			Goals	Ref
Ronnie Bull	England	DF	2005	10	0	10	0	
Ben Collett	England	MF	2005–2006	18	3	21	0	
Sean Devine	Ireland	FW	2005–2006	23	10	33	3	
Neil Emblen	England	MF	2005–2007	34	3	37	3	
Steve Fitzsimmons	Australia	U	2005	11	3	14	1	
Danny Hay	New Zealand	DF	2005	11	0	11	0	
Danny Milosevic	Australia	GK	2005–2006	23	0	23	0	
Joshua Rose	Australia	DF	2005–2006	12	3	15	1	
John Tambouras	Australia	DF	2005–2007	21	3	24	1	
Cole Tinkler	New Zealand	DF	2005–2006	11	2	13	0	
Simon Yeo	England	FW	2005	11	1	12	4	
Noah Hickey	New Zealand	MF	2005–2007	36	7	43	2	
Zhang Xiaobin	China	MF	2005–2006	4	11	15	1	
Glen Moss	New Zealand	GK	2005–2006	8	2	10	0	
Frank van Eijs	Netherlands	DF	2005–2006	15	0	15	0	
Jeremy Brockie	New Zealand	FW	2005–2006	9	5	14	4	
Josh Maguire	Australia	MF	2005–2006	8	6	14	0	
Darren Bazeley	England	DF	2005–2007	45	2	47	1	
Jeremy Christie	New Zealand	U	2005–2006	8	2	10	1	
Zenon Caravella	Australia	MF	2005–2006	20	1	21	0	
Naoki Imaya	Japan	U	2005–2006	6	5	11	0	
Kris Bright	New Zealand	FW	2005–2006	9	3	12	0	
Sam Jasper	New Zealand	MF	2006	1	1	2	0	
Malik Buari	England	MF	2006–2007	19	6	25	2	
Che Bunce	New Zealand	DF	2006–2007	22	0	22	1	
Scot Gemmill	Scotland	MF	2006–2007	14	4	18	0	
Sime Kovacevic	Australia	DF	2006	15	2	17	0	
Jonti Richter	Australia	FW	2006–2007	17	7	24	1	
Jonas Salley	Ivory Coast	MF	2006–2007	15	0	15	0	
Michael Turnbull	Australia	GK	2006	8	0	8	0	
Michael White	New Zealand	U	2006–2007	3	11	14	0	
Grégory Duruz	Switzerland	DF	2006	15	1	16	0	
Adam Casey	Australia	FW	2006	5	8	13	0	
Dani Rodrigues	Portugal	MF	2006	9	0	9	1	
Richard Johnson	Australia	MF	2006–2007	19	1	20	0	
Ivan Necevski	Australia	GK	2006	2	0	2	0	
Franco Parisi	Australia	FW	2006	0	1	1	0	
Campbell Banks	New Zealand	FW	2006	1	1	2	0	
Hamza Mohammed	Ghana	MF	2006	1	1	2	0	
Fernando de Moraes	Australia	MF	2006	2	3	5	0	
Dustin Wells	Australia	MF	2006	6	0	6	0	
Alen Marcina	Canada	FW	2006–2007	8	0	8	2	
Mark Paston	New Zealand	GK	2006–2007	10	0	10	0	
Dean Gordon	England	DF	2006–2007	6	0	6	0	
Gao Leilei	China	MF	2006–2007	6	1	7	1	
Jeff Fleming	New Zealand	MF	2006	1	0	1	0	
Steven O'Dor	Australia	DF	2006–2007	3	0	3	0	
Li Yan	China	MF	2006–2007	0	2	2	0	

== Club captains ==
Two players held the position of captain of the New Zealand Knights between 2005 and 2007. The first club captain was Danny Hay, who led the side in 2005. The longest-serving captain was Darren Bazeley, who was captain from 2005 to 2007 after taking over from Hay.

Dates	Name	Notes
2005	(New Zealand) Danny Hay	
2005–2007	(England) Darren Bazeley	Longest-serving captain in Knights' history

== Notes ==
- A utility player is one who is considered to play in more than one position.
