= 2006–07 New Zealand Knights FC season =

New Zealand Knights
2006–07 season
- Manager: Paul Nevin; Barry Simmonds; Ricki Herbert
- A-League: 8th
- Pre-Season Cup: 8th
- Top goalscorer: Noah Hickey and Neil Emblen (2)
- Highest home attendance: 7,304 (vs. Newcastle Jets, 27 August 2006)
- Lowest home attendance: 1,632 (vs. Central Coast Mariners, 28 September 2006)
Home colours	Away colours

The 2006–07 New Zealand Knights FC season was the club's second season in the Australian A-League. The club finishing in eighth place.

== Players ==
=== Squad ===
Note: Flags indicate national team as defined under FIFA eligibility rules; some limited exceptions apply. Players may hold more than one non-FIFA nationality.

No.	Pos.	Nation	Player
1	GK	AUS	Danny Milosevic
2	DF	ENG	Darren Bazeley
3	DF	SUI	Grégory Duruz
4	DF	NZL	Che Bunce
5	DF	AUS	Matthew Thai
6	MF	ENG	Neil Emblen
7	MF	AUS	Richard Johnson
8	MF	SCO	Scot Gemmill
9	FW	POR	Dani Rodrigues
10	FW	IRL	Sean Devine
11	MF	RSA	Jonti Richter
12	FW	AUS	Lionel Ramirez
13	MF	CIV	Jonas Salley
14	MF	GHA	Malik Buari
15	MF	AUS	Adam Casey
16	MF	NZL	Noah Hickey
17	DF	NED	Frank van Eijs
18	MF	NZL	Michael White
19	DF	AUS	Sime Kovacevic
20	GK	AUS	Michael Turnbull

No.	Pos.	Nation	Player
21	DF	AUS	Steven O'Dor
22	DF	AUS	John Tambouras
23	FW	AUS	Franco Parisi
24	MF	GHA	Hamza Mohammed
25	FW	NZL	Campbell Banks
26	MF	BRA	Fernando
27	MF	AUS	Dustin Wells
28	FW	CAN	Alen Marcina
29	MF	CHN	Li Yan
30	GK	NZL	Mark Paston
31	MF	CHN	Leilei Gao
32	MF	NZL	Jeff Fleming
33	DF	ENG	Dean Gordon
34	DF	ENG	Matt Carbon
35	MF	AUS	Justin Kiryu
36	FW	NZL	Kris Bright
37	DF	NZL	Cole Tinkler
38	MF	NZL	Sam Jasper
39	FW	NZL	Sam Messam
40	GK	NZL	Roy Bell

=== Transfers in ===
No.	Name	Nat.	Pos.	Signed From	League	Transfer Fee
3	Grégory Duruz	(Switzerland)	DF	(Switzerland) FC Thun	Swiss Super League	Free
4	Che Bunce	(New Zealand)	DF	(New Zealand) Waikato FC	NZFC	Free
5	Matt Carbon	(England)	DF	(England) Barnsley	English League One	Free
7	Richard Johnson	(Australia)	FW	(Australia) Newcastle United Jets	A-League	Free
8	Scot Gemmill	(Scotland)	MF	(England) Oxford United	English League Two	Free
9	Dani Rodrigues	(Portugal)	FW	(England) AFC Bournemouth	English League Two	Free
11	Jonti Richter	(Australia)	MF	(Australia) Queensland Roar	A-League	Free
12	Mark Paston	(New Zealand)	GK	(Scotland) St Johnstone FC	Scottish First Division	Free
13	Jonas Salley	(Ivory Coast)	MF	(Australia) South Melbourne	Victorian Premier League	Free
14	Malik Buari	(Ghana)	DF	(England) Woking	English Conference South	Free
15	Adam Casey	(Australia)	FW	(Australia) Wollongong Wolves	National Premier Leagues NSW	Free
15	Michael White	(New Zealand)	MF	(New Zealand) Canterbury United	New Zealand Football Championship	Free
19	Sime Kovacevic	(Australia)	DF	(Australia) Sunshine George Cross	Victorian Premier League	Free
20	Michael Turnbull	(Australia)	GK	(Australia) Kingston City	Victorian Premier League	Free
23	Franco Parisi	(Australia)	FW	(Australia) Newcastle Jets	A-League	Free

=== Transfers out ===
No.	Name	Nat.	Pos.	Signed With	League	Transfer Fee
7	Steve Fitzsimmons	(Australia)	DF	(Australia) Queensland Roar	A-League	Free
8	Ben Collett	(England)	MF	(Netherlands) AGOVV Apeldoorn	Eerste Divisie	Free
11	Zenon Caravella	(Australia)	MF	(Netherlands) FC Omniworld	Eerste Divisie	Free
12	Cole Tinkler	(New Zealand)	DF	(New Zealand) Auckland City	New Zealand Football Championship	Free
13	Jeremy Brockie	(New Zealand)	FW	(Australia) Sydney FC	A-League	Free
14	Josh Maguire	(Australia)	MF	(Romania) Universitatea Craiova	Liga I	Free
15	Joshua Rose	(Australia)	DF	(Romania) Universitatea Craiova	Liga I	Free
18	Xiaobin Zhang	(China)	FW	(Australia) Kingston City	Victorian Premier League	Free
19	Naoki Imaya	(Japan)	FW	(Australia) Brisbane City	Queensland Premier League	Free
20	Glen Moss	(New Zealand)	GK	(Romania) Dinamo București	Liga I	Free
21	Jeremy Christie	(New Zealand)	MF	(Australia) Perth Glory	A-League	Free
22	Sam Jasper	(New Zealand)	MF	(New Zealand) Waitakere United	New Zealand Football Championship	Free
24	Kris Bright	(New Zealand)	DF	(Netherlands) Fortuna Sittard	Eerste Divisie	Free
27	Roy Bell	(New Zealand)	GK	Free Agent	–	–

=== Mid-Season Gains ===
No.	Name	Nat.	Pos.	Signed From	League	Transfer Fee
21	Steven O'Dor	(Australia)	DF	(Australia) South Melbourne	Victorian Premier League	Free
22	John Tambouras	(Australia)	DF	(Greece) Kalamata	Super League Greece	Free
24	Hamza Mohammed	(Ghana)	MF	(Ghana) Real Tamale United	Ghana Premier League	Free
25	Campbell Banks	(New Zealand)	FW	(New Zealand) YoungHeart Manawatu	New Zealand Football Championship	Free
26	Fernando de Moraes	(Brazil)	MF	(Australia) South Melbourne	Victorian Premier League	Undisclosed
27	Dustin Wells	(Australia)	MF	(Australia) Belconnen United	ACT Premier League	Free
28	Alen Marcina	(Canada)	FW	Puerto Rico Islanders	USL First Division	Free
29	Li Yan	(China)	MF	(China) Shanghai Pudong	Chinese Super League	Free
31	Leilei Gao	(China)	MF	(China) Beijing Guoan	Chinese Super League	Loan
32	Jeff Fleming	(New Zealand)	MF	(Australia) Green Gully	Victorian Premier League	Loan
33	Dean Gordon	(England)	DF	(New Zealand) Auckland City	NZFC	Free
40	Nick Crossley	(New Zealand)	GK	(Australia) Adelaide United	A-League	Free

=== Mid-Season Losses ===
No.	Name	Nat.	Pos.	Signed To	League	Transfer Fee
1	Danny Milosevic	(Australia)	GK	(Australia) Inglewood United	WA Premier League	Free
5	Matt Carbon	(England)	DF	Released		Free
17	Frank van Eijs	(Netherlands)	DF	Retired		
23	Franco Parisi	(Australia)	FW	(Australia) APIA Leichhardt Tigers	NSW Premier League	Free
24	Hamza Mohammed	(Ghana)	MF	(Ghana) King Harrison Accra		Free
25	Campbell Banks	(New Zealand)	FW	(Australia) Green Gully	Victorian Premier League	Free
29	Dustin Wells	(Australia)	MF	(Australia) Wollongong Wolves	NSW Premier League	Free
32	Jeff Fleming	(New Zealand)	MF	(Australia) Green Gully	Victorian Premier League	Loan Return

== Competitions ==
=== Pre-season ===
16 July 2006 Group Stage	New Zealand Knights	1 : 1	Newcastle Jets	North Harbour Stadium, Auckland
				Attendance: 804

22 July 2006 Group Stage	Queensland Roar	1 : 1	New Zealand Knights	Maroochydore Soccer Club, Maroochydore
				Attendance: 3,347

29 July 2006 Group Stage	New Zealand Knights	0 : 0	Sydney FC	North Harbour Stadium, Auckland
				Attendance: 3,121

4 August 2006 Bonus Round	Adelaide United	1 : 0	New Zealand Knights	Hindmarsh Stadium, Adelaide
				Attendance: 12,006

11 August 2006 Play-offs	New Zealand Knights	0 : 1	Perth Glory	North Harbour Stadium, Auckland
				Attendance: 1,104

18 August 2006 7th place Play-off	New Zealand Knights	1 : 2	Queensland Roar	North Harbour Stadium, Auckland

=== A-League ===
Pos	Team	Pld	W	D	L	GF	GA	GD	Pts	Qualification
1	Melbourne Victory (C)	21	14	3	4	41	20	+21	45	Qualification for 2008 AFC Champions League group stage and Finals series
2	Adelaide United	21	10	3	8	32	27	+5	33	Qualification for 2008 AFC Champions League group stage and Finals series
3	Newcastle Jets	21	8	6	7	32	30	+2	30	Qualification for Finals series
4	Sydney FC	21	8	8	5	29	19	+10	29 (Note: Sydney FC were penalised three competition points following round 18 due to salary cap breaches which occurred during the 2005–06 season)	Qualification for Finals series
5	Queensland Roar	21	8	5	8	25	27	−2	29	
6	Central Coast Mariners	21	6	6	9	22	26	−4	24	
7	Perth Glory	21	5	5	11	24	30	−6	20	
8	New Zealand Knights (Note: New Zealand Knights cannot qualify for the AFC Champions League as they are not recognised as an AFC club.)	21	5	4	12	13	39	−26	19	Disbanded at end of season

Source: ultimatealeague.com
Rules for classification: 1) points; 2) goal difference; 3) number of goals scored.
(C) Champions
Notes:

27 August 2006 Round 1	New Zealand Knights	0 : 0	Newcastle Jets	North Harbour Stadium, Auckland
				Attendance: 7,304; Referee: Simon Przydacz

2 September 2006 Round 2	New Zealand Knights	1 : 0	Adelaide United	North Harbour Stadium, Auckland
	Buari 84'			Attendance: 4,100; Referee: Peter Green

10 September 2006 Round 3	New Zealand Knights	0 : 3	Melbourne Victory	North Harbour Stadium, Auckland
			Muscat 35'; Thompson 22'; Allsopp 9'	Attendance: 2,071; Referee: Matthew Breeze

15 September 2006 Round 4	Queensland Roar	5 : 0	New Zealand Knights	Suncorp Stadium
	Milicic 80'; Lynch 72'; Reinaldo 55' (pen.); McKay 7', 86'			Attendance: 15,517; Referee: Mark Shield

21 September 2006 Round 5	New Zealand Knights	0 : 1	Sydney FC	North Harbour Stadium, Auckland
			Rudan 58'	Attendance: 2,764; Referee: Ben Williams

28 September 2006 Round 6	New Zealand Knights	0 : 1	Central Coast Mariners	North Harbour Stadium, Auckland
	Duruz (red card) 87'; Bunce (red card) 83'		Kwasnik 85' (pen.)	Attendance: 1,632; Referee: Peter O'Leary

6 October 2006 Round 7	Perth Glory	1 : 0	New Zealand Knights	Members Equity Stadium
	Young 37'			Attendance: 7,309; Referee: Craig Zetter

14 October 2006 Round 8	Newcastle Jets	3 : 0	New Zealand Knights	EnergyAustralia Stadium
	Rodriguez 90+1'; Musialik 86'; North 72'			Attendance: 5,275; Referee: Peter Green

22 October 2006 Round 9	Adelaide United	4 : 2	New Zealand Knights	Hindmarsh Stadium
	Dodd 84'; Petta 56'; Veart 36'; Burns 23'		van Dommele 71' (o.g.); Hickey 65'	Attendance: 11,600; Referee: Angelo Nardi

27 October 2006 Round 10	New Zealand Knights	0 : 4	Melbourne Victory	North Harbour Stadium, Auckland
			Allsopp 72'; Caceres 59'; Thompson 57'; Fred 9'	Attendance: 2,357; Referee: Simon Przydacz

5 November 2006 Round 11	New Zealand Knights	1 : 0	Queensland Roar	North Harbour Stadium, Auckland
	Ognenovski 7' (o.g.)			Attendance: 2,675; Referee: Craig Zetter

10 November 2006 Round 12	Sydney FC	4 : 0	New Zealand Knights	Aussie Stadium
	Petrovski 37', 53'; Zdrillic 65'; Carney 89'			Attendance: 9,871; Referee: Angelo Nardi

19 November 2006 Round 13	New Zealand Knights	0 : 2	Central Coast Mariners	North Harbour Stadium, Auckland
			Mori 65'; Mrdja 90+5'	Attendance: 2,139; Referee: Peter Green

26 November 2006 Round 14	Perth Glory	4 : 1	New Zealand Knights	Members Equity Stadium
	Harnwell 10', 42', 60'; Despotovski 83'		Hickey 3'; Salley (yellow card) 8' (yellow-red card) 33'	Attendance: 6,251; Referee: Simon Przydacz

3 December 2006 Round 15	New Zealand Knights	1 : 1	Newcastle Jets	North Harbour Stadium, Auckland
	Marcina 29' (pen.)		Griffiths 13'	Attendance: 2,039; Referee: Peter O’Leary

10 December 2006 Round 16	Adelaide United	1 : 1	New Zealand Knights	Hindmarsh Stadium
	Owens 72'		Gao 18'	Attendance: 11,548; Referee: Angelo Nardi

17 December 2006 Round 17	Melbourne Victory	4 : 0	New Zealand Knights	Olympic Park
	Allsopp 35', 45'; Caceres 39'; Thompson 45+3'			Attendance: 15,563; Referee: Angelo Nardi

29 December 2006 Round 18	New Zealand Knights	3 : 1	Queensland Roar	North Harbour Stadium, Auckland
	Tambouras 14'; Emblen 52'; Marcina 56'		Milicic 80'	Attendance: 1,903; Referee: Peter O’Leary

7 January 2007 Round 19	Sydney FC	0 : 1	New Zealand Knights	Aussie Stadium
			Bunce 16'	Attendance: 16,040; Referee: Simon Przydacz

11 January 2007 Round 20	Central Coast Mariners	0 : 0	New Zealand Knights	Bluetongue Stadium
				Attendance: 10,637; Referee: Ben Williams

21 January 2007 Round 21	New Zealand Knights	2 : 0	Perth Glory	North Harbour Stadium, Auckland
	Emblen 32'; Buari 40'			Attendance: 4,936; Referee: Kevin Docherty
