= List of New Zealand Knights FC records and statistics =

New Zealand Knights Football Club was a New Zealand professional football club based in Auckland. The club was founded in 2004 and played in the A-League until they became defunct in 2007.

This list encompasses the records set by New Zealand Knights, their managers and their players. The player records section includes details of the club's leading goalscorers and those who have made most appearances in first-team competitions. The club's attendance records at North Harbour Stadium, their home ground, are also included in the list.

The club's record appearance maker is Darren Bazeley, who made 47 appearances between 2005 and 2007, and the club's record goalscorers are Jeremy Brockie and Simon Yeo who scored 4 goals apiece.

== Player record ==
=== Appearances ===
- Youngest first-team player: Jeremy Brockie – 17 years, 296 days (against Queensland Roar, Pre-Season Challenge Cup, 30 July 2005)
- Oldest first-team player: Scot Gemmill – 36 years, 9 days (against Central Coast Mariners, A-League, 11 January 2007)
- Most consecutive appearances: Darren Bazeley, 43 (from 28 August 2005 to 10 December 2006)

==== Most appearances ====
Competitive, professional matches only. Appearances as substitute (in parentheses) included in total.

	Name	Years	A-League	Pre-Season Cup	Total
1	(England) Darren Bazeley	2005–2007	41 (0)	6 (2)	47 (2)
2	(New Zealand) Noah Hickey	2005–2007	35 (6)	8 (1)	43 (7)
3	(England) Neil Emblen	2005–2007	32 (2)	5 (1)	37 (3)
4	(Republic of Ireland) Sean Devine	2005–2006	24 (6)	9 (4)	33 (10)
5	(England) Malik Buari	2006–2007	19 (5)	6 (1)	25 (6)
6	(Australia) Jonti Richter	2006–2007	18 (6)	6 (1)	24 (7)
6	(Australia) John Tambouras	2005–2007	21 (3)	3 (0)	24 (3)
8	(Australia) Danny Milosevic	2005–2006	19 (0)	4 (0)	23 (0)
9	(New Zealand) Che Bunce	2006–2007	19 (0)	3 (0)	22 (0)
10	(Australia) Zenon Caravella	2005–2006	21 (1)	0 (0)	21 (1)
10	(England) Ben Collett	2005–2006	18 (3)	3 (0)	21 (3)

=== Goalscorers ===
- Most goals in a season in all competitions: 4
  - Jeremy Brockie, 2005–06
  - Simon Yeo, 2005–06
- Most League goals in a season:
  - Jeremy Brockie, 2005–06
  - Simon Yeo, 2005–06
- Top League scorer with fewest goals in a season: 2
  - Neil Emblen, 2006–07
  - Noah Hickey, 2006–07
- Most goals scored in a match: 2 – Jeremy Brockie v Newcastle Jets, 4 November 2005
- Youngest first-team goalscorer: Jeremy Brockie – 18 years, 28 days (against Newcastle Jets, A-League, 4 November 2005)
- Oldest first-team goalscorer: Neil Emblen – 35 years, 216 days (against Perth Glory, A-League, 21 January 2007)

==== Overall scorers ====
Competitive, professional matches only, appearances including substitutes appear in brackets.

	Name	Years	A-League	Pre-Season Cup	Total
1	(New Zealand) Jeremy Brockie	2005–2006	4 (12)	0 (2)	4 (14)
1	(England) Simon Yeo	2005	4 (10	0 (1)	4 (11)
3	(Republic of Ireland) Sean Devine	2005–2006	3 (24)	0 (9)	3 (33)
3	(England) Neil Emblen	2005–2007	3 (32)	0 (5)	3 (37)
5	(England) Malik Buari	2006–2007	2 (19)	0 (6)	2 (25)
5	(New Zealand) Noah Hickey	2005–2007	2 (35)	0 (8)	2 (43)
5	(Canada) Alen Marcina	2006–2007	2 (8)	0 (0)	2 (8)
8	(England) Darren Bazeley	2005–2007	0 (41)	1 (6)	1 (47)
8	(New Zealand) Che Bunce	2006–2007	1 (19)	0 (3)	1 (22)
8	(New Zealand) Jeremy Christie	2005–2006	1 (10)	0 (0)	1 (10)
8	(Australia) Steve Fitzsimmons	2005	0 (11)	1 (3)	1 (14)
8	(China) Gao Leilei	2006–2007	1 (6)	0 (0)	1 (6)
8	(Australia) Jonti Richter	2006–2007	0 (18)	1 (6)	1 (24)
8	(Portugal) Dani Rodrigues	2006	0 (4)	1 (5)	1 (9)
8	(Australia) Joshua Rose	2005–2006	1 (12)	0 (3)	1 (15)
8	(Australia) John Tambouras	2005–2007	1 (21)	0 (3)	1 (24)
8	(China) Zhang Xiaobin	2005–2006	1 (12)	0 (3)	1 (15)

=== Internationals ===
- First international: Danny Hay for New Zealand against Australia (9 June 2005)
- Most international caps (total): 50 – Jeremy Brockie – New Zealand (2 while with the club)

== Managerial records ==
- First full-time manager: John Adshead
- Longest-serving manager: John Adshead

== Team records ==
=== Matches ===
- First competitive match: Sydney FC 3–1 New Zealand Knights, A-League Pre-Season Challenge Cup, 24 July 2005
- First A-League match: Queensland Roar 2–0 New Zealand Knights, 28 August 2005
- First match at North Harbour Stadium: New Zealand Knights 0–5 Queensland Roar, 30 July 2005

==== Record wins ====
- Record win:
  - 2–0 v Central Coast Mariners, A-League, 10 September 2005
  - 3–1 v Queensland Roar, A-League, 29 December 2006
  - 2–0 v Perth Glory, A-League, 21 January 2007
- Record League win:
  - 2–0 v Central Coast Mariners, 10 September 2005
  - 3–1 v Queensland Roar, 29 December 2006
  - 2–0 v Perth Glory, 21 January 2007
- Record home win:
  - 3–1 v Queensland Roar, A-League, 29 December 2006
  - 2–0 v Perth Glory, A-League, 21 January 2007
- Record away win: 2–0 v Central Coast Mariners, A-League, 10 September 2005

==== Record defeats ====
- Record defeat:0–5
  - v Queensland Roar, A-League Pre-Season Challenge Cup, 30 July 2005
  - v Queensland Roar, A-League, 15 September 2006
- Record League defeat: 0–5 v Queensland Roar, 15 September 2006
- Record A-League Pre-Season Challenge Cup defeat: 0–5 v Queensland Roar, 30 July 2005
- Record home defeat: 0–5 v Queensland Roar, A-League Pre-Season Challenge Cup, 30 July 2005
- Record away defeat: 0–5 v Queensland Roar, A-League Pre-Season Challenge Cup, 30 July 2005

==== Streaks ====
- Longest unbeaten run: 4 matches, 29 December 2006 to 21 January 2007
- Longest winning streak: 2 matches, 29 December 2006 to 7 January 2007
- Longest losing streak: 11 matches, 18 September 2005 to 26 November 2005
- Longest streak without a win: 25 matches, 18 September 2005 to 27 August 2006
- Longest non-scoring run: 6 matches, 10 September 2006 to 14 October 2006
- Longest streak without conceding a goal: 3 matches, 7 January 2007 to 21 January 2007

==== Wins/draws/losses in a season ====
- Most wins in a league season: 5 – 2006–07
- Most draws in a league season: 4 – 2006–07
- Most defeats in a league season: 17 – 2005–06
- Fewest wins in a league season: 1 – 2005–06
- Fewest draws in a league season: 3 – 2005–06
- Fewest defeats in a league season: 12 – 2006–07

=== Goals ===
- Most League goals scored in a season: 15 – 2005–06
- Fewest League goals scored in a season: 13 – 2006–07
- Most League goals conceded in a season: 47 – 2005–06
- Fewest League goals conceded in a season: 39 – 2006–07

=== Points ===
- Most points in a season: 19 – 2006–07
- Fewest points in a season: 6 – 2005–06

=== Attendances ===
- Highest home attendance: 9,827 v Sydney FC at North Harbour Stadium, A-League, 2 September 2005
- Highest away attendance: 20,725 v Brisbane Roar, A-League, 28 August 2005
