= A-League transfers for 2006–07 season =

This is a list of Australian football transfers for the 2006–07 A-League. Only moves featuring at least one A-League club are listed.

Clubs were able to sign players at any time, but many transfers will only officially go through on 1 June because the majority of player contracts finish on 31 May.

== Transfers ==
All players without a flag are Australian. Clubs without a flag are clubs participating in the A-League.

=== Pre-season ===
Date	Name	Moving from	Moving to
20 January 2006	Michael Baird	Queensland Roar	(Romania) Universitatea Craiova
13 February 2006	Adrian Caceres	Perth Glory	Melbourne Victory
16 February 2006	Carl Recchia	Melbourne Victory	Unattached
16 February 2006	Ricky Diaco	Melbourne Victory	Unattached
4 March 2006	Todd Gava	Queensland Roar	Unattached
4 March 2006	Reece Tollenaere	Queensland Roar	Unattached
9 March 2006	(New Zealand) Jeremy Christie	New Zealand Knights	Perth Glory
17 March 2006	(New Zealand) Jeremy Brockie	New Zealand Knights	Sydney FC
23 March 2006	Andrew Packer	Sydney FC	Queensland Roar
29 March 2006	(New Zealand) Leo Bertos	Unattached	Perth Glory
30 March 2006	Richard Johnson	Newcastle Jets	New Zealand Knights
15 April 2006	(New Zealand) Che Bunce	(New Zealand) Waikato	New Zealand Knights
5 May 2006	Jonti Richter	Queensland Roar	New Zealand Knights
8 May 2006	Michael Turnbull	(Australia) Kingston City	New Zealand Knights
15 May 2006	Ante Milicic	Newcastle Jets	Queensland Roar
16 May 2006	David Williams	Queensland Roar	(Denmark) Brøndby
18 May 2006	(Brazil) Fred	Unattached	Melbourne Victory
18 May 2006	(Brazil) Claudinho	Unattached	Melbourne Victory
19 May 2006	Archie Thompson	(Netherlands) PSV Eindhoven	Melbourne Victory (loan return)
23 May 2006	(England) Malik Buari	Unattached	New Zealand Knights
30 May 2006	(New Zealand) Michael White	(New Zealand) Canterbury United	New Zealand Knights
6 June 2006	Ned Zelic	Newcastle Jets	Unattached
6 June 2006	Paul Okon	(Cyprus) APOEL FC	Newcastle Jets
27 June 2006	Nick Ward	Perth Glory	(England) Queens Park Rangers
29 June 2006	(Switzerland) Grégory Duruz	Unattached	New Zealand Knights
30 June 2006	Adam Casey	(Australia) Wollongong Wolves	New Zealand Knights
3 July 2006	(Scotland) Simon Lynch	Unattached	Queensland Roar
4 July 2006	Vuko Tomasevic	(Australia) Marconi Stallions	Central Coast Mariners
6 July 2006	Stan Lazaridis	Unattached	Perth Glory
11 July 2006	Roddy Vargas	(Australia) Green Gully	Melbourne Victory
13 July 2006	Alessandro	Unattached	Melbourne Victory
17 July 2006	(Netherlands) Bobby Petta	(England) Bradford City	Adelaide United
19 July 2006	Bruce Djite	(Australia) AIS	Adelaide United
19 July 2006	Nathan Burns	(Australia) AIS	Adelaide United
27 July 2006	(New Zealand) Glen Moss	New Zealand Knights	(Romania) Dinamo București
31 July 2006	(New Zealand) Steven Old	(New Zealand) YoungHeart Manawatu	Newcastle Jets
1 August 2006	(China) Zhang Yuning	(China) Shanghai Shenua	Queensland Roar
2 August 2006	(New Zealand) Mark Paston	Unattached	New Zealand Knights
4 August 2006	Tony Vidmar	Unattached	Central Coast Mariners
7 August 2006	(England) Matt Carbon	Unattached	New Zealand Knights

=== Regular season ===
Date	Name	Moving from	Moving to
1 September 2006	(Trinidad and Tobago) Dwight Yorke	Sydney FC	(England) Sunderland
4 September 2006	Franco Parisi	Newcastle Jets	New Zealand Knights
8 September 2006	Joel Theissen	(Australia) Parramatta	Sydney FC
27 September 2006	Damian Mori	(Australia) Adelaide City	Central Coast Mariners
28 September 2006	(Italy) Benito Carbone	Unattached	Sydney FC
30 September 2006	(Brazil) Romário	(United States) Miami FC	Adelaide United (loan)
14 October 2006	(New Zealand) Campbell Banks	Unattached	New Zealand Knights
18 October 2006	(Italy) Benito Carbone	Sydney FC	Unattached
18 October 2006	(Brazil) Fernando	(Australia) South Melbourne	New Zealand Knights
3 November 2006	Dustin Wells	Unattached	New Zealand Knights
22 November 2006	Damian Mori	Central Coast Mariners	Queensland Roar
29 November 2006	Chris Grossman	Unattached	Queensland Roar
1 December 2006	(England) Dean Gordon	(New Zealand) Auckland City	New Zealand Knights
1 December 2006	(China) Gao Leilei	(China) Beijing Guoan	New Zealand Knights
1 December 2006	(China) Li Yan	Unattached	New Zealand Knights
13 December 2006	John Tambouras	Unattached	New Zealand Knights
15 December 2006	(Brazil) Romário	Adelaide United	(United States) Miami FC (loan return)
16 December 2006	(New Zealand) Jeff Fleming	(Australia) Green Gully	New Zealand Knights
16 December 2006	Nick Crossley	Unattached	New Zealand Knights
19 January 2007	Tallan Martin	Unattached	Sydney FC
1 February 2007	(Ivory Coast) Jonas Salley	New Zealand Knights	Sydney FC
