= 2006–07 A-League =

30th season of top-tier soccer league in Australia

A-League
- Season: 2006–07
- Dates: 25 August 2006 – 18 February 2007
- Champions: Melbourne Victory (1st title)
- Premiers: Melbourne Victory (1st title)
- AFC Champions League: Melbourne Victory; Adelaide United
- Matches: 84
- Goals: 218 (2.6 per match)
- Top goalscorer: Archie Thompson (15 goals)
- Biggest home win: Brisbane Roar 5–0 New Zealand Knights (15 September 2006)
- Biggest away win: New Zealand Knights 0–4 Melbourne Victory (27 October 2006)
- Highest scoring: Adelaide United 5–1 Newcastle Jets (8 September 2006); Adelaide United 4–2 New Zealand Knights (22 October 2006)
- Longest winning run: 7 Matches; Melbourne Victory
- Longest unbeaten run: 9 Matches; Sydney FC
- Longest winless run: 8 Matches; New Zealand Knights
- Longest losing run: 8 Matches; New Zealand Knights
- Highest attendance: 50,333; Melbourne Victory 0–0 Sydney FC (8 December 2006)
- Lowest attendance: 1,632; New Zealand Knights 0–1 Central Coast Mariners (28 September 2006)
- Total attendance: 1,281,447
- Average attendance: 12,927 ( 1972)
- (Note: Longest runs only include regular season results)

The 2006–07 A-League was the 30th season of top-flight soccer in Australia, and the second season of the A-League since its establishment the previous season. Football Federation Australia hoped to build on the success of the first season and on the interest generated by the Socceroos competing in the 2006 FIFA World Cup. Fox Sports had signed a A$120 million deal over 7 years for the exclusive broadcast rights of the A-League, AFC Champions League, and national team matches (excluding matches played in the World Cup finals).

The television advertisement campaign used for the 2006–07 season was the same as the previous season, with different music. Scribe's song "Not Many" was replaced with Manuel Neztic's "Kickin Down". The second season was marketed as "A-League: Version 2".

== Clubs ==

Team	Location	Stadium	Capacity
Adelaide United	Adelaide	Hindmarsh Stadium	17,000
Central Coast Mariners	Gosford	Bluetongue Stadium	20,119
Melbourne Victory	Melbourne	Olympic Park Stadium	18,500
Melbourne Victory	Melbourne	Telstra Dome	56,347
Newcastle Jets	Newcastle	Energy Australia Stadium	26,164
New Zealand Knights	Auckland	North Harbour Stadium	25,000
Perth Glory	Perth	Members Equity Stadium	18,156
Queensland Roar	Brisbane	Suncorp Stadium	52,500
Sydney FC	Sydney	Aussie Stadium	42,500

=== Foreign players ===
Club	Visa 1	Visa 2	Visa 3	Visa 4	Non-Visa foreigner(s)	Former player(s)
Adelaide United	(Brazil) Diego	(Brazil) Fernando	(China) Qu Shengqing	(Netherlands) Bobby Petta		(Brazil) Romário^{4}
Central Coast Mariners	(Germany) André Gumprecht	(Republic of Ireland) Wayne O'Sullivan			(England) Jamie McMaster^{2} (Malta) John Hutchinson^{2}	
Melbourne Victory	(Brazil) Alessandro	(Brazil) Fred	(England) James Robinson	(Scotland) Grant Brebner		(Belgium) Geoffrey Claeys (Brazil) Claudinho^{4}
New Zealand Knights	(England) Darren Bazeley	(England) Malik Buari	(England) Neil Emblen	(Portugal) Dani Rodrigues	(Brazil) Fernando^{3} (Canada) Alen Marcina^{3} (China) Gao Leilei^{3} (China) Li Yan^{3} (Ghana) Hamza Mohammed^{3} (Republic of Ireland) Sean Devine^{1} (Scotland) Scot Gemmill^{3}	(England) Dean Gordon^{3}
Newcastle Jets	(Colombia) Milton Rodríguez	(New Zealand) Tim Brown	(New Zealand) Steven Old		(New Zealand) Vaughan Coveny^{1}	
Perth Glory	(New Zealand) Leo Bertos	(New Zealand) Jeremy Christie	(New Zealand) Danny Hay		(England) Mark Lee^{1} (England) Stuart Young^{1}	
Queensland Roar	(Brazil) Reinaldo	(Germany) Marcus Wedau	(Scotland) Simon Lynch	(Switzerland) Remo Buess	(China) Zhang Yuning^{3} (Scotland) Stuart McLaren^{1} (South Korea) Seo Hyuk-su^{1}	
Sydney FC	(New Zealand) Jeremy Brockie	(Northern Ireland) Terry McFlynn			(Ivory Coast) Jonas Salley^{1}	(Italy) Benito Carbone^{4} (Trinidad and Tobago) Dwight Yorke

The following do not fill a Visa position:
^{1}Those players who were born and started their professional career abroad but have since gained Australian Residency (and New Zealand Residency, in the case of New Zealand Knights);
^{2}Australian residents (and New Zealand residents, in the case of New Zealand Knights) who have chosen to represent another national team;
^{3}Injury Replacement Players, or National Team Replacement Players;
^{4}Guest Players (eligible to play a maximum of ten games)

=== Salary cap exemptions and captains ===
Club	Marquee	Captain	Vice-Captain
Adelaide United	(China) Qu Shengqing	(Australia) Ross Aloisi	None
Central Coast Mariners	(Australia) Tony Vidmar	(Australia) Noel Spencer (Australia) Alex Wilkinson (Note: Wilkinson replaced Spencer as captain mid-season)	None
Melbourne Victory	(Australia) Archie Thompson	(Australia) Kevin Muscat	(Australia) Archie Thompson
New Zealand Knights	(Scotland) Scot Gemmill	(England) Darren Bazeley	None
Newcastle Jets	(Australia) Paul Okon	(Australia) Paul Okon	None
Perth Glory	(Australia) Stan Lazaridis	(Australia) Jamie Harnwell	None
Queensland Roar	None	(Australia) Chad Gibson	None
Sydney FC	(Trinidad and Tobago) Dwight Yorke (Note: Yorke was released from his marquee deal early by Sydney FC to join Sunderland in September 2006.)	(Australia) Mark Rudan	None

== Pre-Season Challenge Cup ==
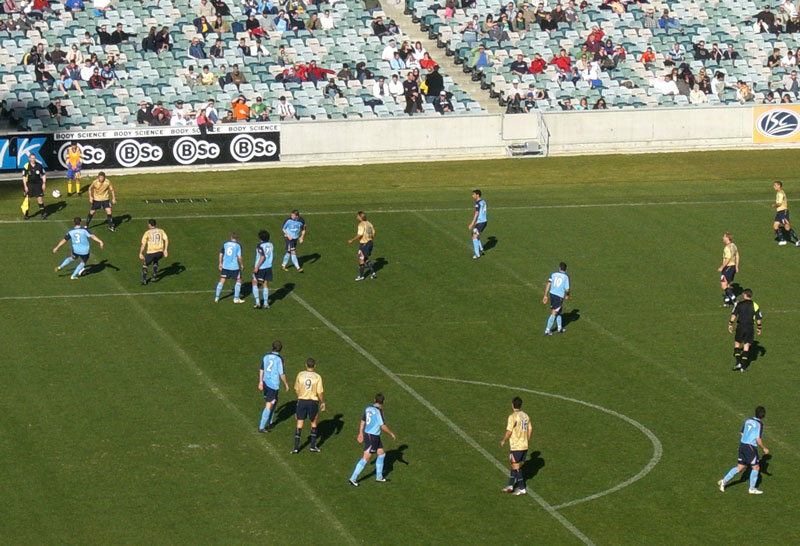
Newcastle playing Sydney in a pre-season match in Canberra

This competition was held in July and August in the lead up to the start of the A-League season. The opening round was 15 July 2006. The competition featured a group stage, with three regular rounds and a bonus round, followed by a two-week finals playoff. The bonus group round matched up teams against opponents from the other group, and also offered the incentive of "bonus points" based on goals scored (1 point for 2 goals, 2 points for 3 goals, 3 points for 4 or more goals).

The Pre-Season Cup was used to enhance the A-League's profiles by playing pre-season games in regional centres including the Gold Coast, Sunshine Coast, Toowoomba, Launceston, Canberra, Wollongong, Port Macquarie, Orange and Tamworth.

The pre-season cup was won by Adelaide United at the final on 19 August 2006.

== Regular season ==
The league season took a triple round-robin format, and took place over 21 rounds between 25 August 2006 and 21 January 2007.

=== League table ===
Pos	Team	Pld	W	D	L	GF	GA	GD	Pts	Qualification
1	Melbourne Victory (C)	21	14	3	4	41	20	+21	45	Qualification for 2008 AFC Champions League group stage and Finals series
2	Adelaide United	21	10	3	8	32	27	+5	33	Qualification for 2008 AFC Champions League group stage and Finals series
3	Newcastle Jets	21	8	6	7	32	30	+2	30	Qualification for Finals series
4	Sydney FC	21	8	8	5	29	19	+10	29 (Note: Sydney FC were penalised three competition points following round 18 due to salary cap breaches which occurred during the 2005–06 season)	Qualification for Finals series
5	Queensland Roar	21	8	5	8	25	27	−2	29	
6	Central Coast Mariners	21	6	6	9	22	26	−4	24	
7	Perth Glory	21	5	5	11	24	30	−6	20	
8	New Zealand Knights (Note: New Zealand Knights cannot qualify for the AFC Champions League as they are not recognised as an AFC club.)	21	5	4	12	13	39	−26	19	Disbanded at end of season

Source: ultimatealeague.com
Rules for classification: 1) points; 2) goal difference; 3) number of goals scored.
(C) Champions

=== Results ===
==== Round 1 ====
25 August 2006	Melbourne Victory	2–0	Adelaide United	Olympic Park Stadium, Melbourne
20:00 UTC+10	Claudinho 78'; Muscat 29' (pen.)			Attendance: 15,781; Referee: Matthew Breeze

26 August 2006	Queensland Roar	3–0	Perth Glory	Suncorp Stadium, Brisbane
19:30 UTC+10	McLaren 84'; Vidosic 82'; Lynch 79'			Attendance: 20,606; Referee: Ben Williams

27 August 2006	New Zealand Knights	0–0	Newcastle Jets	North Harbour Stadium, Auckland
16:30 UTC+12				Attendance: 7,304; Referee: Simon Przydacz

27 August 2006	Sydney FC	1–0	Central Coast Mariners	Aussie Stadium, Sydney
17:00 UTC+10	Fyfe 52'			Attendance: 19,274; Referee: Mark Shield

==== Round 2 ====
1 September 2006	Newcastle Jets	2–3	Queensland Roar	EnergyAustralia Stadium, Newcastle
	Bridge 40'; Gibson 25' (o.g.)		Lynch 88'; Okon 38' (o.g.); Reinaldo 5'	Attendance: 7,276; Referee: Angelo Nardi

2 September 2006	New Zealand Knights	1–0	Adelaide United	North Harbour Stadium, Auckland
	Buari 84'			Attendance: 4,100; Referee: Peter Green

2 September 2006	Melbourne Victory	3–2	Sydney FC	Telstra Dome, Melbourne
	Muscat 11' (pen.); Allsopp 8', 51'		Vargas 84' (o.g.); Fyfe 18'	Attendance: 39,730; Referee: Mark Shield

3 September 2006	Perth Glory	2–0	Central Coast Mariners	Members Equity Stadium, Perth
	Young 81'; Colosimo 52'			Attendance: 7,229; Referee: Craig Zetter

==== Round 3 ====
8 September 2006	Adelaide United	5–1	Newcastle Jets	Hindmarsh Stadium, Adelaide
	Durante 65' (o.g.); Qu 28'; Cornthwaite 19'; Rech 8', 73'		Bridge 52'	Attendance: 8,785; Referee: Mark Shield

9 September 2006	Central Coast Mariners	0–0	Queensland Roar	Bluetongue Stadium, Gosford
				Attendance: 4,644; Referee: Peter O'Leary

10 September 2006	New Zealand Knights	0–3	Melbourne Victory	North Harbour Stadium, Auckland
			Muscat 35'; Thompson 22'; Allsopp 9'	Attendance: 2,071; Referee: Matthew Breeze

10 September 2006	Perth Glory	1–1	Sydney FC	Members Equity Stadium, Perth
	Coyne 69'		Petrovski 36'	Attendance: 7,229; Referee: Simon Przydacz

==== Round 4 ====
15 September 2006	Queensland Roar	5–0	New Zealand Knights	Suncorp Stadium, Brisbane
	Milicic 80'; Lynch 72'; Reinaldo 55' (pen.); McKay 7', 86'			Attendance: 15,517; Referee: Mark Shield

16 September 2006	Adelaide United	3–0	Perth Glory	Hindmarsh Stadium, Adelaide
	Dodd 34'; Rech 14', 50'			Attendance: 11,474; Referee: Peter O'Leary

17 September 2006	Sydney FC	2–2	Newcastle Jets	Aussie Stadium, Sydney
	Zdrillic 38'; Corica 33' (pen.)		Rodriguez 45', 62'	Attendance: 15,488; Referee: Matthew Breeze

17 September 2006	Melbourne Victory	1–0	Central Coast Mariners	Olympic Park Stadium, Melbourne
	Thompson 51'			Attendance: 17,617; Referee: Angelo Nardi

==== Round 5 ====
21 September 2006	New Zealand Knights	0–1	Sydney FC	North Harbour Stadium, Auckland
			Rudan 58'	Attendance: 2,764; Referee: Ben Williams

22 September 2006	Queensland Roar	0–0	Adelaide United	Suncorp Stadium, Brisbane
				Attendance: 16,143; Referee: Matthew Breeze

23 September 2006	Central Coast Mariners	1–1	Newcastle Jets	Bluetongue Stadium, Gosford
	Hutchinson 12'		Griffiths 84'	Attendance: 8,439; Referee: Simon Przydacz

24 September 2006	Perth Glory	1–2	Melbourne Victory	Members Equity Stadium, Perth
	Tarka 90'		Muscat 72' (pen.); Caceres 54'	Attendance: 7,983; Referee: Peter Green

==== Round 6 ====
28 September 2006	New Zealand Knights	0–1	Central Coast Mariners	North Harbour Stadium, Auckland
			Kwasnik 85' (pen.)	Attendance: 1,632; Referee: Peter O'Leary

29 September 2006	Newcastle Jets	0–3	Perth Glory	EnergyAustralia Stadium, Newcastle
			Harnwell 83'; Young 44', 90'	Attendance: 7,961; Referee: Matthew Breeze

1 October 2006	Melbourne Victory	4–1	Queensland Roar	Telstra Dome, Melbourne
	Allsopp 82'; Muscat 22' (pen.), 56' (pen.); Fred 11'		Milicic 16'	Attendance: 25,921; Referee: Simon Przydacz

2 October 2006	Adelaide United	1–4	Sydney FC	Hindmarsh Stadium, Adelaide
	Burns 54'		Carbone 85'; Petrovski 80'; Dodd 57' (o.g.); Zadkovich 36'	Attendance: 15,119; Referee: Mark Shield

==== Round 7 ====
6 October 2006	Adelaide United	3–1	Central Coast Mariners	Hindmarsh Stadium, Adelaide
	Burns 90'; Rees 58'; Veart 25'		Mori 38'	Attendance: 10,493; Referee: Ben Williams

6 October 2006	Perth Glory	1–0	New Zealand Knights	Members Equity Stadium, Perth
	Young 37'			Attendance: 7,309; Referee: Craig Zetter

8 October 2006	Sydney FC	1–1	Queensland Roar	Aussie Stadium, Sydney
	Ceccoli 45'		Dilevski 15'	Attendance: 17,274; Referee: Matthew Breeze

8 October 2006	Newcastle Jets	0–2	Melbourne Victory	EnergyAustralia Stadium, Newcastle
			Allsopp 69', 90'	Attendance: 4,635; Referee: Peter Green

==== Round 8 ====
13 October 2006	Central Coast Mariners	3–1	Sydney FC	Bluetongue Stadium, Gosford
	Mori 52', 90'; O'Grady 40'		Carbone 12'	Attendance: 11,567; Referee: Simon Przydacz

14 October 2006	Newcastle Jets	3–0	New Zealand Knights	EnergyAustralia Stadium, Newcastle
	Rodriguez 90+1'; Musialik 86'; North 72'			Attendance: 5,275; Referee: Peter Green

15 October 2006	Melbourne Victory	0–1	Adelaide United	Telstra Dome, Melbourne
			Owens 83'	Attendance: 32,368; Referee: Matthew Breeze

15 October 2006	Perth Glory	1–2	Queensland Roar	Members Equity Stadium, Perth
	Young 2'		Vidosic 53'; Milicic 14'	Attendance: 9,978; Referee: Ben Williams

==== Round 9 ====
20 October 2006	Central Coast Mariners	2–1	Perth Glory	Bluetongue Stadium, Gosford
	Pondeljak 2', 87'		Despotovski 58'	Attendance: 8,496; Referee: Matthew Breeze

21 October 2006	Sydney FC	1–2	Melbourne Victory	Aussie Stadium, Sydney
	Corica 9'		Thompson 50', 73'	Attendance: 20,881; Referee: Mark Shield

22 October 2006	Queensland Roar	0–1	Newcastle Jets	Suncorp Stadium, Brisbane
			Coveny 34'	Attendance: 16,061; Referee: Peter O'Leary

22 October 2006	Adelaide United	4–2	New Zealand Knights	Hindmarsh Stadium, Adelaide
	Dodd 84'; Petta 56'; Veart 36'; Burns 23'		van Dommele 71' (o.g.); Hickey 65'	Attendance: 11,600; Referee: Angelo Nardi

==== Round 10 ====
27 October 2006	New Zealand Knights	0–4	Melbourne Victory	North Harbour Stadium, Auckland
			Allsopp 72'; Caceres 59'; Thompson 57'; Fred 9'	Attendance: 2,357; Referee: Simon Przydacz

27 October 2006	Newcastle Jets	2–1	Adelaide United	EnergyAustralia Stadium, Newcastle
	Carle 90'; Coveny 26'		Veart 37' (pen.)	Attendance: 10,895; Referee: Matthew Breeze

28 October 2006	Queensland Roar	1–1	Central Coast Mariners	Suncorp Stadium, Brisbane
	Reinaldo 49'		Mori 21'	Attendance: 13,727; Referee: Mark Shield

29 October 2006	Sydney FC	1–1	Perth Glory	Aussie Stadium, Sydney
	Zdrillic 15'		Glavas 75'	Attendance: 12,316; Referee: Ben Williams

==== Round 11 ====
3 November 2006	Melbourne Victory	3–3	Central Coast Mariners	Telstra Dome, Melbourne
	Allsopp 4', 68'; Thompson 10'		McMaster 6'; Petrie 11'; Kwasnik 23' (pen.)	Attendance: 28,118; Referee: Peter Green

4 November 2006	Newcastle Jets	1–1	Sydney FC	EnergyAustralia Stadium, Newcastle
	Brown 86'		Zdrillic 14'	Attendance: 8,493; Referee: Mark Shield

5 November 2006	Adelaide United	3–2	Perth Glory	Hindmarsh Stadium, Adelaide
	Veart 8'; Owens 24'; Kemp 57'		Saric 14'; Despotovski 45+2'	Attendance: 11,032; Referee: Matthew Breeze

5 November 2006	New Zealand Knights	1–0	Queensland Roar	North Harbour Stadium, Auckland
	Ognenovski 7' (o.g.)			Attendance: 2,675; Referee: Craig Zetter

==== Round 12 ====
9 November 2006	Melbourne Victory	1–0	Perth Glory	Telstra Dome, Melbourne
	Brebner 88'			Attendance: 22,890; Referee: Craig Zetter

10 November 2006	Sydney FC	4–0	New Zealand Knights	Aussie Stadium, Sydney
	Petrovski 37', 53'; Zdrillic 65'; Carney 89'			Attendance: 9,871; Referee: Angelo Nardi

11 November 2006	Queensland Roar	0–1	Adelaide United	Suncorp Stadium, Brisbane
			Dodd 62'	Attendance: 14,154; Referee: Ben Williams

11 November 2006	Newcastle Jets	3–1	Central Coast Mariners	EnergyAustralia Stadium, Newcastle
	Bridge 6'; Carle 17'; Rodriguez 79'		Mori 40'	Attendance: 14,026; Referee: Matthew Breeze

==== Round 13 ====
17 November 2006	Queensland Roar	0–2	Melbourne Victory	Suncorp Stadium, Brisbane
			Packer 18' (o.g.); Thompson 46'	Attendance: 14,797; Referee: Simon Przydacz

18 November 2006	Perth Glory	2–1	Newcastle Jets	Members Equity Stadium, Perth
	Harnwell 38'; Glavaš 90+4'		Carle 77' (pen.)	Attendance: 7,315; Referee: Angelo Nardi

19 November 2006	New Zealand Knights	0–2	Central Coast Mariners	North Harbour Stadium, Auckland
			Mori 65'; Mrdja 90+5'	Attendance: 2,139; Referee: Peter Green

19 November 2006	Sydney FC	2–1	Adelaide United	Aussie Stadium, Sydney
	Talay 15' (pen.); Rudan 22'		Aloisi 9'	Attendance: 14,308; Referee: Matthew Breeze

==== Round 14 ====
24 November 2006	Sydney FC	3–0	Queensland Roar	Aussie Stadium, Sydney
	Talay 23' (pen.); Corica 64'; Middleby 89'			Attendance: 12,718; Referee: Ben Williams

25 November 2006	Central Coast Mariners	2–0	Adelaide United	Bluetongue Stadium, Gosford
	Kwasnik 55'; Petrie 59'			Attendance: 13,119; Referee: Mark Shield

26 November 2006	Perth Glory	4–1	New Zealand Knights	Members Equity Stadium, Perth
	Harnwell 10', 42', 60'; Despotovski 83'		Hickey 3'	Attendance: 6,251; Referee: Simon Przydacz

26 November 2006	Melbourne Victory	0–1	Newcastle Jets	Telstra Dome, Melbourne
			Rodriguez 61'	Attendance: 27,753; Referee: Matthew Breeze

==== Round 15 ====
1 December 2006	Adelaide United	1–3	Melbourne Victory	Hindmarsh Stadium, Adelaide
	Fernando 42'		Muscat 16' (pen.); Allsopp 61'; Fred 86'	Attendance: 16,378; Referee: Mark Shield

2 December 2006	Queensland Roar	1–0	Perth Glory	Suncorp Stadium, Brisbane
	McKay 80'			Attendance: 11,237; Referee: Craig Zetter

3 December 2006	New Zealand Knights	1–1	Newcastle Jets	North Harbour Stadium, Auckland
	Marcina 29' (pen.)		Griffiths 13'	Attendance: 2,039; Referee: Peter O’Leary

3 December 2006	Central Coast Mariners	0–0	Sydney FC	Bluetongue Stadium, Gosford
				Attendance: 12,457; Referee: Matthew Breeze

==== Round 16 ====
7 December 2006	Queensland Roar	0–3	Newcastle Jets	Suncorp Stadium, Brisbane
			Bridge 9', 77'; Griffiths 53'	Attendance: 10,040; Referee: Matthew Breeze

8 December 2006	Melbourne Victory	0–0	Sydney FC	Telstra Dome, Melbourne
				Attendance: 50,333; Referee: Mark Shield

10 December 2006	Central Coast Mariners	1–0	Perth Glory	Bluetongue Stadium, Gosford
	Kwasnik 12'			Attendance: 8,089; Referee: Peter O’Leary

10 December 2006	Adelaide United	1–1	New Zealand Knights	Hindmarsh Stadium, Adelaide
	Owens 72'		Gao 18'	Attendance: 11,548; Referee: Angelo Nardi

==== Round 17 ====
14 December 2006	Sydney FC	1–0	Perth Glory	Aussie Stadium, Sydney
	Brosque 80'			Attendance: 11,816; Referee: Simon Przydacz

15 December 2006	Adelaide United	3–2	Newcastle Jets	Hindmarsh Stadium, Adelaide
	Romário 15'; Fernando 60'; Owens 78'		Bridge 59'; Thompson 67'	Attendance: 12,214; Referee: Mark Shield

16 December 2006	Central Coast Mariners	2–3	Queensland Roar	Bluetongue Stadium, Gosford
	Kwasnik 29' (pen.), 77' (pen.)		Griffin 40'; Vidosic 63', 80'	Attendance: 7,132; Referee: Matthew Breeze

17 December 2006	Melbourne Victory	4–0	New Zealand Knights	Olympic Park Stadium, Melbourne
	Allsopp 35', 45'; Caceres 39'; Thompson 45+3'			Attendance: 15,563; Referee: Angelo Nardi

==== Round 18 ====
28 December 2006	Perth Glory	0–0	Adelaide United	Members Equity Stadium, Perth
				Attendance: 8,226; Referee: Ben Williams

29 December 2006	New Zealand Knights	3–1	Queensland Roar	North Harbour Stadium, Auckland
	Tambouras 14'; Emblen 52'; Marcina 56'		Milicic 80'	Attendance: 1,903; Referee: Peter O’Leary

31 December 2006	Central Coast Mariners	1–2	Melbourne Victory	Bluetongue Stadium, Gosford
	Kwasnik 52'		Fred 23'; Thompson 26'	Attendance: 15404; Referee: Mark Shield

1 January 2007	Newcastle Jets	0–2	Sydney FC	EnergyAustralia Stadium, Newcastle
			Brosque 46'; Petrovski 90+1'	Attendance: 20,980; Referee: Matthew Breeze

==== Round 19 ====
4 January 2007	Adelaide United	0–1	Queensland Roar	Hindmarsh Stadium, Adelaide
			Reinaldo 52'	Attendance: 10,435; Referee: Matthew Breeze

5 January 2007	Newcastle Jets	1–0	Central Coast Mariners	EnergyAustralia Stadium, Newcastle
	Rodriguez 25'			Attendance: 14,828; Referee: Mark Shield

7 January 2007	Sydney FC	0–1	New Zealand Knights	Aussie Stadium, Sydney
			Bunce 16'	Attendance: 16,040; Referee: Simon Przydacz

7 January 2007	Perth Glory	2–2	Melbourne Victory	Members Equity Stadium, Perth
	Harnwell 29'; Byrnes 43' (o.g.)		Sarkies 58', 76'	Attendance: 6,462; Referee: Peter Green

==== Round 20 ====
11 January 2007	Central Coast Mariners	0–0	New Zealand Knights	Bluetongue Stadium, Gosford
				Attendance: 10,637; Referee: Ben Williams

12 January 2006	Melbourne Victory	1–2	Queensland Roar	Telstra Dome, Melbourne
	Thompson 79'		Mori 18'; Vidosic 90+2'	Attendance: 28,937; Referee: Mark Shield

14 January 2007	Adelaide United	1–0	Sydney FC	Hindmarsh Stadium, Adelaide
	Fernando 89'			Attendance: 14,704; Referee: Matthew Breeze

14 January 2007	Perth Glory	3–3	Newcastle Jets	Members Equity Stadium, Perth
	Colosimo 43' (pen.); Harnwell 78'; Magdic 81'		Carle 12'; Griffiths 90+1', 90+4'	Attendance: 7,904; Referee: Simon Przydacz

==== Round 21 ====
19 January 2007	Newcastle Jets	4–0	Melbourne Victory	EnergyAustralia Stadium, Newcastle
	Bridge 36', 48'; Coveny 51'; Griffiths 73'			Attendance: 19,601; Referee: Matthew Breeze

20 January 2007	Queensland Roar	1–1	Sydney FC	Suncorp Stadium, Brisbane
	Mori 20'		Brosque 13'	Attendance: 32,371; Referee: Mark Shield

21 January 2007	New Zealand Knights	2–0	Perth Glory	North Harbour Stadium, Auckland
	Emblen 32'; Buari 40'			Attendance: 4,936; Referee: Kevin Docherty

21 January 2007	Central Coast Mariners	1–3	Adelaide United	Bluetongue Stadium, Gosford
	Pondeljak 77'		Burns 10', 49', 66'	Attendance: 8,128; Referee: Simon Przydacz

== Finals series ==
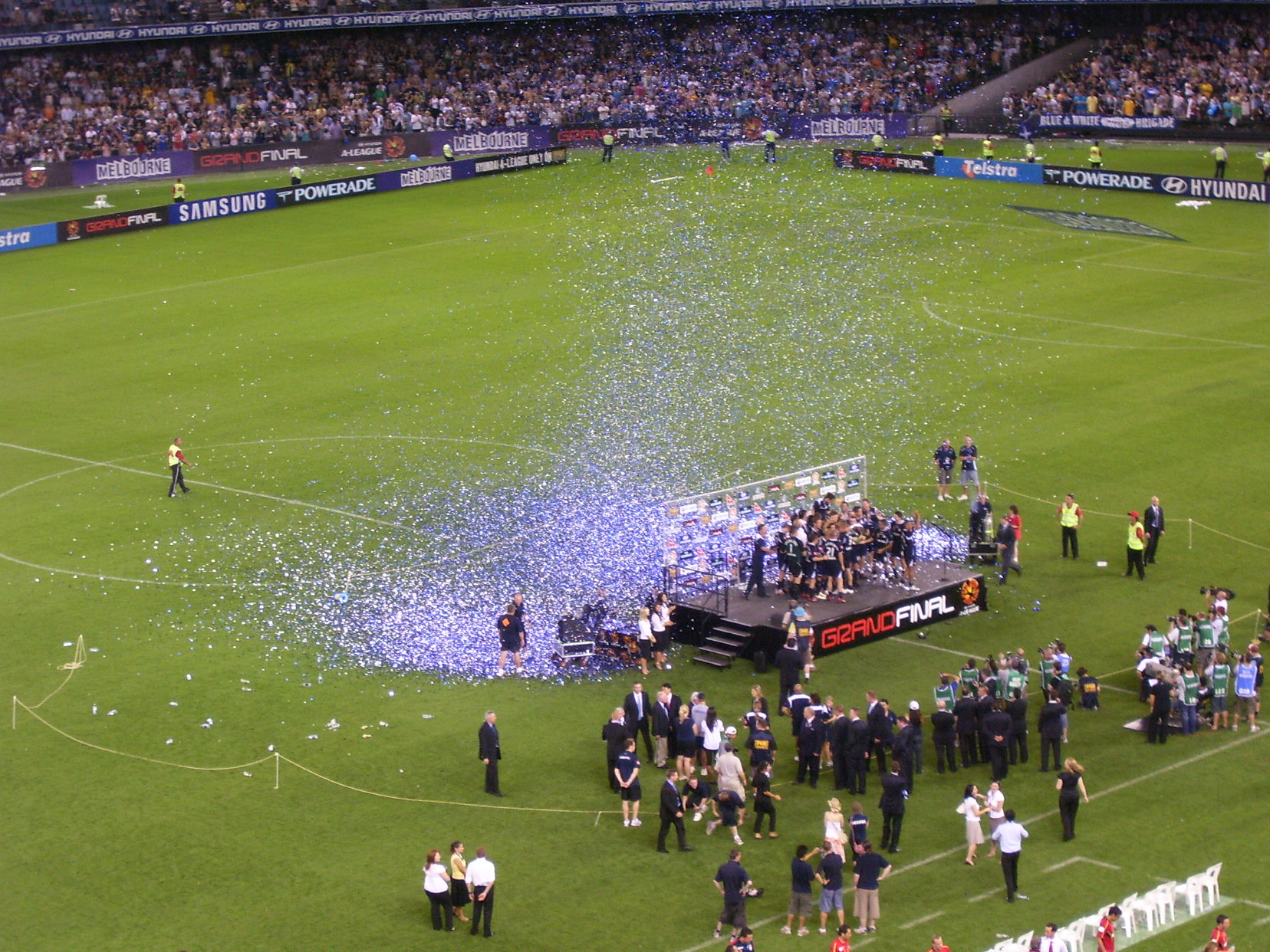
Melbourne Victory celebrating their 2007 A-League Grand Final victory.

Semifinals
2	Adelaide United	0	1	1
1	Melbourne Victory	0	2	2
4	Sydney FC	2	0	2
3	Newcastle Jets	1	2	3

Preliminary final
2	Adelaide United (p)	1 (4)
3	Newcastle Jets	1 (3)

Final
1	Melbourne Victory	6
2	Adelaide United	0

=== Semi-finals ===
26 January 2007
20:00 UTC+11

Sydney FC	2–1	Newcastle Jets
Brosque 15'; Milligan 30'		Rodriguez 71'

Aussie Stadium, Sydney, Sydney
Attendance: 21,112
Referee: Peter Green
2 February 2007
20:00 UTC+11

Newcastle Jets	2–0	Sydney FC
Griffiths 57'; Coveny 71'

EnergyAustralia Stadium, Newcastle
Attendance: 24,338
Referee: Matthew Breeze

Newcastle Jets won 3–2 on aggregate.

28 January 2007
17:30 UTC+10.30

Adelaide United	0–0	Melbourne Victory

Hindmarsh Stadium, Adelaide
Attendance: 15,575
Referee: Simon Przydacz
4 February 2007
18:00 UTC+11

Melbourne Victory	2–1	Adelaide United
Allsopp 48'; Robinson 90+2'		Dodd 4'

Telstra Dome, Melbourne
Attendance: 47,413
Referee: Mark Shield

Melbourne Victory won 2–1 on aggregate.

=== Preliminary Final ===
11 February 2007
17:30 UTC+10.30

Adelaide United	1–1 (a.e.t.)	Newcastle Jets
Veart 57'		Coveny 74'
Penalties
Diego (penalty scored); Owens (penalty scored); Alagich (penalty scored); Aloisi (penalty scored)	4–3	(penalty scored) Bridge; (penalty scored) Carle; (penalty scored) Thompson; (penalty missed) Coveny; (penalty missed) Musialik

Hindmarsh Stadium, Adelaide
Attendance: 13,798
Referee: Matthew Breeze

=== Grand Final ===
18 February 2007
18:00 UTC+11

Melbourne Victory	6–0	Adelaide United
Thompson 20', 29', 39', 56', 72'; Sarkies 90+3'

Telstra Dome, Melbourne
Attendance: 55,436
Referee: Mark Shield

The Asian Football Confederation announced on 21 November 2006 that Adelaide United and Sydney FC would represent Australia in the 2007 AFC Champions League. Despite an appeal by the Football Federation Australia, it was determined that the 2005–06 A-League premiers and champions would qualify and not those from the current season.

The AFC also indicated that the qualification arrangements would not be reviewed prior to 2009. The FFA have indicated that the premiers and champions of A-League 2006–07 will qualify for the 2008 AFC Champions League – establishing a precedent of maintaining a one-year lag between qualification and participation.

== Season statistics ==
=== Leading goalscorers ===
Rank	Player	Team	Goals
1	(Australia) Archie Thompson	Melbourne Victory	15
2	(Australia) Daniel Allsopp	Melbourne Victory	12
3	(Australia) Damian Mori	Central Coast Mariners (6), Queensland Roar (2)	8
3	(Australia) Mark Bridge	Newcastle Jets	8
5	(Australia) Adam Kwasnik	Central Coast Mariners	7
5	(Australia) Jamie Harnwell	Perth Glory	7

=== Most yellow cards ===
Rank	Player	Team	Yellow Cards
1	(Australia) Adrian Leijer	Melbourne Victory	7
2	(Australia) Nick Carle	Newcastle Jets	6
2	(Australia) Andrew Durante	Newcastle Jets	6
4	(Australia) Kevin Muscat	Melbourne Victory	5
4	(Northern Ireland) Terry McFlynn	Sydney FC	5
4	(Australia) Simon Colosimo	Perth Glory	5

=== Attendances ===
Team	Hosted	Average	High	Low	Total
Melbourne Victory	11	27,728	50,333	15,563	305,011
Queensland Roar	10	16,465	32,371	10,040	164,653
Sydney FC	10	14,999	20,881	9,871	149,986
Adelaide United	11	12,162	16,378	8,785	133,782
Newcastle Jets	10	11,442	20,980	4,635	114,420
Central Coast Mariners	11	9,828	15,404	4,644	108,112
Perth Glory	10	7,671	9,978	6,251	76,709
New Zealand Knights	11	3,014	7,304	1,632	33,156
League total	84	12,927	50,333	1,632	1,085,829

=== Highest attendances ===
- 55,436: Melbourne Victory vs Adelaide United, 18 February 2007 (Grand Final)
- 50,333: Melbourne Victory vs Sydney FC, 8 December 2006 (Round 16)
- 47,413: Melbourne Victory vs Adelaide United, 4 February 2007 (Finals Week 2)
- 39,730: Melbourne Victory vs Sydney FC, 2 September 2006 (Round 2)
- 32,371: Queensland Roar vs Sydney FC, 20 January 2007 (Round 21)

== Awards ==
The 2007 A-League Awards ceremony was held on 27 February 2007.

Award	Winner	Club
Johnny Warren Medal	(Australia) Nick Carle	Newcastle Jets
Young Footballer of the Year	(Australia) Adrian Leijer	Melbourne Victory
Golden Boot Award	(Australia) Danny Allsopp	Melbourne Victory
Goalkeeper of the Year	(Australia) Michael Theoklitos	Melbourne Victory
Coach of the Year	(Scotland) Ernie Merrick	Melbourne Victory
Fair Play Award	Perth Glory	
Referee of the Year	(Australia) Mark Shield	

== See also ==
- 2006–07 Adelaide United season
- 2006–07 Central Coast Mariners season
- 2006–07 Melbourne Victory season
- 2006–07 Newcastle Jets FC season
- 2006–07 New Zealand Knights season
- 2006–07 Perth Glory season
- 2006–07 Queensland Roar season
- 2006–07 Sydney FC season
