= New Zealand Knights FC league record by opponent =

New Zealand Knights Football Club is Australian professional association football club based in Auckland, New Zealand. The club was formed in 2004. They became the first team to compete in the A-League as a club from New Zealand.

== Key ==
- The table includes results of matches played by New Zealand Knights FC in the A-League.
- The name used for each opponent is the name they had when New Zealand Knights most recently played a league match against them. Results against each opponent include results against that club under any former name.
- The columns headed "First" and "Last" contain the first and most recent seasons in which New Zealand Knights played league matches against each opponent.
- P = matches played; W = matches won; D = matches drawn; L = matches lost; Win% = percentage of total matches won

== All-time league record ==
New Zealand Knights FC league record by opponent
Club	P	W	D	L	P	W	D	L	P	W	D	L	Win%	First	Last	Notes
Club	Home				Away				Total				Win%	First	Last	Notes
Adelaide United	3	1	1	1	3	0	1	2	6	1	2	3	16.67	2005–06	2006–07	
Central Coast Mariners	3	0	0	3	3	1	1	1	6	1	1	4	16.67	2005–06	2006–07	
Melbourne Victory	2	0	0	2	4	0	0	4	6	0	0	6	0.00	2005–06	2006–07	
Newcastle Jets	3	0	2	1	3	0	0	3	6	0	2	4	0.00	2005–06	2006–07	
Perth Glory	3	1	0	2	3	0	0	3	6	1	0	5	16.67	2005–06	2006–07	
Queensland Roar	3	2	0	1	3	0	1	2	6	2	1	3	33.33	2005–06	2006–07	
Sydney FC	3	0	1	2	3	1	0	2	6	1	1	4	16.67	2005–06	2006–07	
