= Sime Kovacevic =

Australian soccer player

Personal information
- Full name: Sime Kovacevic
- Date of birth: 21 July 1987 (age 39)
- Place of birth: Australia
- Position: Defender

Senior career*
Years	Team	Apps	(Gls)
2004	Whittlesea Stallions	6	(0)
2005	St Albans Dinamo	15	(1)
2005–2006	Dinamo Zagreb	0	(0)
2006	Sunshine George Cross	11	(1)
2006–2007	New Zealand Knights	11	(0)
2007	North Geelong Warriors		(1)
2008	Hume City	25	(2)
2009	Whittlesea Zebras	18	(0)
2010–2012	Altona Magic	54	(3)
- * Club domestic league appearances and goals

Sime Kovacevic (born 21 July 1987 in Australia) is a footballer who plays for Altona Magic in Victoria's Division 1

Kovacevic played for New Zealand Knights during the 2006–07 A-League.
