= Adam Casey (soccer) =

Australian soccer player (born 1986)

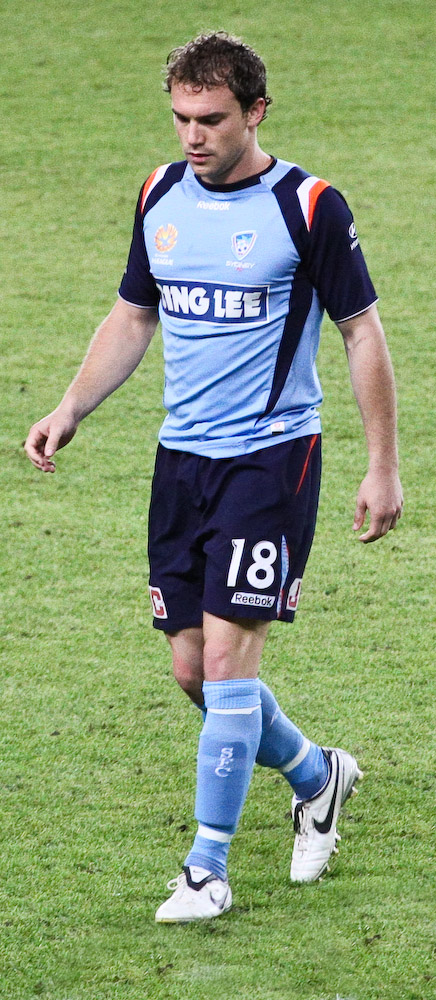
- Casey playing for Sydney FC in 2008

Personal information
- Full name: Adam Casey
- Date of birth: 1 May 1986 (age 40)
- Place of birth: Sydney, Australia
- Height: 1.77 m (5 ft 10 in)
- Positions: Winger; striker

Youth career
- Townsville Warriors
- 2002: ACTAS
- 2003: AIS

Senior career*
Years	Team	Apps	(Gls)
2004	O'Connor Knights	12	(8)
2004–2005	Belconnen	3	(1)
2005–2006	Wollongong Wolves	20	(10)
2006–2007	New Zealand Knights	8	(0)
2007–2010	Sydney FC	13	(2)
2010–2011	North Queensland Fury	9	(0)
2011–2012	Dandaloo FC		
2012	Dandenong Thunder	0	(0)
2012	APIA Leichhardt	10	(6)
2013–2014	Rockdale City	4	(0)
2014	Tuggeranong United	8	(0)

International career
2003	Australia U-17	16	(9)
2007	Australia U-23	3	(0)
- * Club domestic league appearances and goals

Adam Casey (born 1 May 1986) is an Australian former professional footballer who played as a winger and striker. He featured in the A-League for clubs including Sydney FC, New Zealand Knights, and North Queensland Fury, and represented Australia at youth international level.

== Club career ==
Born in Sydney, Adam grew up in Canberra and Townsville joining the ACT Academy of Sport program before progressing in 2003 to a place in the Australian Institute of Sport program. On completion of his AIS scholarship, he joined ACT Premier League club O'Connor Knights for the 2004 winter season and as the NSL had wound up removing any national level opportunities, he played at Belconnen Blue Devils for the NSWPL 2004/05 season. The following summer, with Belconnen outed from the competition, Casey moved to Wollongong Wolves for a brief spell before being signed to New Zealand Knights in April 2006.

Adam came on as a second-half substitute in the Knights opening game of 2006–07. In total, he made eight appearances for the club throughout the season although was unable to find the net, a not uncommon problem for Knights players with only eleven goals scored across the team in a disappointing season.

=== Sydney FC ===
On 30 January 2007, Casey signed a two-year deal with Sydney FC. He played in four matches in Sydney's AFC Champions League 2007 campaign and also made his mark on the scoresheet in a friendly against Marconi Stallions. He signed on another two-year deal under John Kosmina after Branko Culina being let go by the club. Vitezlav Lavicka took the role and he followed up playing six matches during the A-League season and scoring once. Casey agreed to be released 1 year early off his contract and was signed by North Queensland Fury.

=== North Queensland Fury ===
Casey made his debut for the Townsville club in their Round 1, 3–3 draw with Perth Glory.

=== Dandaloo FC ===
With the demise, and eventual folding of North Queensland Fury due to financial reasons, Casey ended up signing for Illawarra Premier League club Dandaloo FC, joining former A-League players Alvin Ceccoli and Noel Spencer.

=== Dandenong Thunder SC ===
Adam signed with Dandenong Thunder from the Victorian Premier League in 2012.

Adam signed with the Rockdale City Suns for the 2013 NSWPL season, joining his former Sydney FC coach Branco Culina at the club.

== International career ==
While at the AIS, he was establishing a place in the Australian U17 squad, scoring six goals in the Joey's 2003 FIFA U-17 World Championship qualification campaign.

Casey was included in the Olyroos squad for a tournament in Vietnam in 2006. He was recalled into the side in May 2007 for 2008 Summer Olympics qualification matches, making an appearance against Jordan.

== Honours ==
With Sydney FC:

- (Australia) A-League Premiership: 2009–2010
- (Australia) A-League Championship: 2009–2010
