= Barry Simmonds =

English football manager

Managerial career
- Years: Team
- 2006–2007: New Zealand Knights

Barry Simmonds is a professional football coach, director, administrator and former player. As a coach he managed New Zealand Knights in the Australian A-League prior to its licence being transferred to new ownership and renamed Wellington Phoenix. He was the Football Director and on the executive board at Norwich City for the Premier League promotion winning 2014–2015 season. He was appointed having held a similar post at Fulham FC over several years.

In 2017 he rejoined Crystal Palace FC. Simmonds had been engaged in previous roles at the London-based Premier League club.

== Biography ==
Having held roles at clubs across the UK and internationally Simmonds has cited various operational models apart from football including the New Zealand All Blacks rugby team off-field methodology and American statistician Bill James as influences. Revered for his work in Major League Baseball James highlighted how undervalued players could be recruited which Simmonds saw parallels with in professional football.

His time at Fulham was highlighted for signing players at the later stages of their careers who proved significant acquisitions. Several featured in delivering the highest ever league position in the club's history and a UEFA Europa League Final. He purposely targeted established internationals noting their leadership qualities as many were captains of their national teams. This included -amongst others- Mark Schwarzer, Zoltan Gera and Damien Duff. This strategy continued with the signings of Dimitar Berbatov and Giorgos Karagounis. The latter was persuaded by Simmonds to delay his retirement. it was an inspired move for the then 36 year old former captain of Greece and European Championship winner as he was voted 'Players Player of The Year'. Berbatov, secured for a fee of £4m just 3 years after signing with Manchester United for £31m won the supporters award.

Simmonds reasoned by signing experienced players it gave the club an opportunity to also bring in younger players and some from lesser known or lower leagues who could develop and be of value without high fees. This was evidenced with the signings and eventual transfers of Chris Smalling and Moussa Dembele to Manchester United and Tottenham Hotspur respectively. David Stockdale and Dan Burn were brought in from Darlington FC.

At Norwich City an overhaul of the playing squad following relegation led to an immediate return to the Premier League. In his award-winning book 'The Nowhere Men' author Michael Calvin credited Simmonds with being a leading figure at the forefront of modern football club structure through the combined use of sports science, statistical analysis and traditional well proven practice.

Following on from Norwich City it was reported in the British media that he had been contracted by The Football Association to work as a member of England manager Roy Hodgson's staff for the national team's preparation and final tournament of the 2016 UEFA European Championship.

His return to Crystal Palace came as changes were made at the club. A football operations role alongside newly appointed sporting director, Dougie Freedman resulted in a revamped scouting and recruitment model being introduced. A focus on players from outside the Premier League brought signings considered ready but importantly future transfer assets. The academy was aligned closer to the first team with investment in facilities and development.

It proved a successful adaptation. Players were traded with substantial profits and academy graduates established themselves in the senior squad.

He is a regular contributor to conferences and courses.
