= Naoki Imaya =

Japanese footballer

Naoki Imaya 今矢 直城
Personal information
- Full name: Naoki Imaya
- Date of birth: 18 June 1980 (age 46)
- Place of birth: Tokyo, Japan
- Height: 1.79 m (5 ft 10 1/2 in)
- Positions: Striker; midfielder

Team information
- Current team: Tochigi City FC (manager)

Senior career*
Years	Team	Apps	(Gls)
2000	Blacktown City	25	(6)
2001	Canberra Cosmos	21	(3)
2002	Blacktown City	22	(6)
2002	Adelaide Galaxy	10	(4)
2003	Blacktown City	22	(1)
2003–2004	Neuchâtel Xamax	8	(0)
2004	La Chaux-de-Fonds	12	(0)
2005	Blacktown City	11	(4)
2005–2006	New Zealand Knights	11	(0)
2006	Marconi Stallions		
2007–2008	VfB Lübeck	12	(0)

Managerial career
- 2010–2017: Waseda United
- 2022–: Tochigi City FC
- * Club domestic league appearances and goals

Naoki Imaya (今矢 直城, Imaya Naoki; born 18 June 1980) is a Japanese football manager and former footballer who played as a midfielder or forward. He currently manager of J2 League club, Tochigi City FC.

== Career ==
As a child he moved to Sydney Australia with his parents at age 10. He played for various Australian clubs before moving to Switzerland. He played in the first season of the A-League with the New Zealand Knights before returning to NSW state league football with Marconi Stallions.

In July 2007 he signed a contract with VfB Lübeck, a traditional club from Lübeck in the federal state of Schleswig-Holstein playing in the 3rd German Regionalliga Nord. He was released by the club after six months due to financial problems.

== Managerial career ==
Imaya is now coaching football to young children in Japan and no longer pursuing a professional career. He worked as an English interpreter for Japanese side Yokohama F. Marinos under Australian manager Ange Postecoglou.

On 12 November 2021, Imaya announcement officially appointed manager of Tochigi City FC in the Kantō Soccer League Division 1 from 2022. On 26 November 2023, Imaya brought his team winning 2023 Japanese Regional Football Champions League after defeat Tsukuba FC 0–4 in final matchweek of RCL and promotion to Japan Football League from 2024 season. On 17 November 2024, Imaya brought his team secure champions of 2024 Japan Football League and promotion to J3 League for the first time in history from next season after defeat Atletico Suzuka 6–0 in matchweek 29 at Kanseki Stadium Tochigi as final home game, return to third tier after 11 years absence. On 23 November 2025, Imaya brought his team secure promotion to J2 League for the first time in history from next season after defeat Nagano Parceiro 3–0 in matchweek 37 at City Football Station as final home game and ended in third tier at one year.

== Managerial statistics ==
As of the match played 23 November 2025.

Team	From	To	Record				
Team	From	To	G	W	D	L	Win %
Tochigi City FC	1 February 2022	present	103	63	21	19	61.17
Total			103	63	21	19	61.17

== Honours ==
=== Manager ===
Tochigi City FC

- Kantō Soccer League Div. 1: 2022
- Japanese Regional Football Champions League : 2023
- Japan Football League : 2024
