= Sam Jasper =

New Zealand footballer

Personal information
- Date of birth: 6 February 1986 (age 40)
- Place of birth: Auckland, New Zealand
- Height: 1.79 m (5 ft 10 in)
- Positions: Centre-back; midfielder

Youth career
- 2001–2002: North Shore United

Senior career*
Years	Team	Apps	(Gls)
2002–2005	North Shore United	78	(26)
2005–2006	New Zealand Knights	2	(0)
2006–2007	Waitakere United	15	(0)
2007–2008	Canterbury United	18	(2)
2008–	Dunedin Technical		
2022	Albany United		

International career
- New Zealand U17
- New Zealand U20

Managerial career
- 2023–2024: Mount Albert-Ponsonby (assistant)
- * Club domestic league appearances and goals

Sam Jasper (born 6 February 1986) is a former New Zealand footballer who played as centre-back or midfielder. He has played for New Zealand Knights in the A-League. He has played for the New Zealand U16, U17 and U-20's teams.

After playing for Albany United in 2022, it was announced Jasper would be the assistant coach for Mount Albert-Ponsonby in the 2023 NRFL Division 1.
