= Frank van Eijs =

Dutch footballer (born 1971)

Personal information
- Full name: Frank van Eijs
- Date of birth: 2 November 1971 (age 54)
- Place of birth: Stein, Limburg, Netherlands
- Height: 1.85 m (6 ft 1 in)
- Position: Defender

Senior career*
| Years | Team | Apps | (Gls) |
| 1995–1996 | KV Mechelen | 21 | (2) |
| 1999–2000 | Dundee | 16 | (0) |
| 2000–2001 | RW Essen | 0 | (0) |
| 2001–2002 | TOP Oss | 4 | (0) |
| 2001–2002 | Qingdao Hailifeng | | |
| 2002–2003 | SV Meppen | 16 | (0) |
| 2004–2005 | Borussia Freialdenhoven | 5 | (0) |
| 2005 | LG-ACB Hanoi | | |
| 2005–2006 | New Zealand Knights | 9 | (0) |
- * Club domestic league appearances and goals as of 10:59, 24 October 2006 (UTC)

Frank van Eijs (born 2 November 1971 in Stein, Limburg) is a Dutch retired footballer, who works as a player agent in Asia.

== Club career ==
Van Eijs has played for several teams in Europe, including spells in Belgium, Scotland, Germany and his native Netherlands, as well as China. He started out his football career at KV Mechelen before "injury forced him to turn to a university course and playing amateur football".

In the summer of 1999, Van Eijs went on trial with Dundee in the Scottish Premier League and scored the only goal of the game, in a 1-0 win against Montrose. His trial impressed Jocky Scott, resulting in him signing a two-year contract with the club. Van Eijs made his debut for Dundee, starting the whole game, in a 4-3 loss against Hibernian in the opening game of the season. However, injuries and loss form saw him result in surplus of requirement for the club. With no appearance for Dundee in his second season, he moved to Germany to join RW Essen.

He played for TOP Oss in the Eerste Divisie. In 2005 he moved to New Zealand to play for New Zealand Knights.

== Player agency ==
Van Eijs later became a player agent and was the one who brought Danny van Bakel to Vietnam and Wiljan Pluim to Indonesia.
