= Danny Milosevic =

Australian soccer player and coach (born 1978)

Personal information
- Full name: Dejan Milosevic
- Date of birth: 26 June 1978 (age 48)
- Place of birth: Melbourne, Australia
- Height: 1.88 m (6 ft 2 in)
- Position: Goalkeeper

Team information
- Current team: Auckland FC (goalkeeper coach)

Youth career
- 1993–1994: AIS

Senior career*
Years	Team	Apps	(Gls)
1995–1997	Canberra Cosmos	14	(0)
1996–1997	Arminia Bielefeld	?	(0)
1997–1998	Preußen Münster	?	(0)
1998–1999	Perth Glory	17	(0)
1999–2004	Leeds United	0	(0)
2002	→ Wolverhampton Wanderers (loan)	1	(0)
2003	→ Plymouth Argyle (loan)	1	(0)
2003	→ Crewe Alexandra (loan)	2	(0)
2004	Celtic	0	(0)
2005–2006	New Zealand Knights	19	(0)
2007–2010	Inglewood United	?	(?)
2007	→ Perth Glory (loan)	0	(0)

International career
1996–1997	Australia U20	13	(0)
1998–2000	Australia U23	14	(0)

Managerial career
- 2014–2015: Australia women's national team - GK Coach
- 2014–2025: Perth Glory - GK Coach
- 2025–2026: Thailand national team - GK Coach
- 2026–: Auckland FC (goalkeeper coach)
Medal record
Representing Australia
Men's Association football
OFC U-20 Championship
Winner	1997 Tahiti
- * Club domestic league appearances and goals

Dejan "Danny" Milosevic (born 26 June 1978) is an Australian football coach and former player. he is the currently goalkeeper coach for Auckland FC in the A-League Men.

== Playing career ==
Milosevic started off his professional career with the Canberra Cosmos in the old NSL and captained the Under-20s Australian side to the World Youth Cup in 1997 playing alongside the likes of Vince Grella and Brett Emerton with the Young Socceroos. They produced the shock of the tournament defeating eventual winners Argentina 4–3 in the group stages.

He moved overseas to play in Germany before joining Perth Glory where he was a high-profile signing under popular new coach Bernd Stange in 1998.

Milosevic moved to Leeds United for £110,000 after only one season at the Perth Glory and he hardly ever got a chance with the likes of England number two Nigel Martyn and then England number one Paul Robinson ahead of him. He was eventually released by Leeds after five years at the club and was signed up on a "pay as you play" contract by Celtic. He left the club without playing after citing personal problems.

Milosevic never returned to Glasgow, and was without a club until he joined the New Zealand Knights for the inaugural A-League season on the advice of former glory teammate Danny Hay. The Knights first season was a disaster, often due to Milosevic's form. "We all make mistakes and Danny would be the first to hold his hand up to some of the errors that he's made this year," Adshead said. He was eventually demoted to the bench with All Whites keeper Mark Paston ahead of him.

Soon after New Zealand Knights' new manager Paul Nevin signed another goalkeeper, Michael Turnbull, to battle for Milosevic's for the A-League's second season. "That's how the game normally works. You wait for your chance through injury or form and take it. You put your head down in training, show the coach what you can do, and fight for the No 1 spot". Paul Nevin. Before the close of the A-League's second season Milosevic was released by the club seen surplus to its requirements.

== After retirement ==
Milosevic is now owner of One 2 One football, a football coaching, promotion, consultation and worldwide football marketing company. A new brand of Goalkeeping gloves designed by Milosevic called XSENTR1Q was launched recently onto the worldwide market.

Milosevic accepted the position of Director of Football at newly promoted NPLV club Ballarat Red Devils in December 2013 ahead of the inaugural 2014 NPLV season. He was motivated to work with the club's youth academy.

Milosevic was Goalkeeper coach with the Australian Women's team (Matildas) finishing second in the Asian Cup for Women in Vietnam 2014.

He was goalkeeper coach at Perth Glory FC.

On 30 July 2026, Milosevic joined Auckland FC alongside new coach Pedro Moreira. He replaced outgoing goalkeeping coach Jonathan Gould.

== Honours ==
Australia U-20

- OFC U-19 Men's Championship: 1997
