= Claudinho (footballer, born May 1982) =

Brazilian footballer

Personal information
- Full name: Cláudio André Santos Assis
- Date of birth: May 7, 1982 (age 44)
- Place of birth: Montes Claros, Brazil
- Height: 1.81 m (5 ft 11 1/2 in)
- Position: Midfielder

Team information
- Current team: Racing Club

Youth career
- Goiás
- Strasbourg

Senior career*
Years	Team	Apps	(Gls)
2002–2006	Atlético Paranaense	132	(29)
2006–2007	Melbourne Victory	5	(1)
2007	Santo André		
2009	Remo		
- Racing Club
- * Club domestic league appearances and goals

Cláudio André Santos Assis, better known as Claudinho (born May 7, 1982) is a Brazilian footballer.

== Biography ==
After playing for RC Strasbourg as a junior, he went on to Atlético Paranaense before being signed by Australian A-League club Melbourne Victory for the 2006–07 season.

Despite arriving in Australia with the greatest reputation of the Trio from Rio (Claudinho, Alessandro and Fred) he failed to make an impact. He scored on debut in Round 1 but made just four more appearances and only two days after the Melbourne Victory were crowned 2006–07 minor Premiers, Claudinho had his contract mutually terminated by the club.

He cited family reasons and being unable to settle into Melbourne as the main reasons his contract was terminated, he returned to Brazil shortly after, joining Esporte Clube Santo André.
