= Ben Collett =

English footballer (born 1984)

Personal information
- Full name: Benjamin Collett
- Date of birth: 11 September 1984 (age 42)
- Place of birth: Bury, England
- Height: 1.75 m (5 ft 9 in)
- Position: Midfielder

Senior career*
| Years | Team | Apps | (Gls) |
| 2002–2006 | Manchester United | 0 | (0) |
| 2006 | New Zealand Knights | 18 | (0) |
| 2006–2007 | AGOVV Apeldoorn | 32 | (0) |
| Total | | 50 | (0) |
- * Club domestic league appearances and goals

Benjamin Collett (born 11 September 1984) is an English former footballer who played as a central midfielder for Manchester United, New Zealand Knights and AGOVV Apeldoorn. Collett joined AGOVV from now-defunct A-League club the New Zealand Knights in 2006 after being released from Manchester United.

== Career ==
Born in Bury, Greater Manchester, Collett began his football career with Manchester United, signing a trainee contract with the club in July 2001. He became a regular in the club's Under-17 side, progressing to the Under-19 team in 2002. For his performances during the 2002–03 season, Collett received the Jimmy Murphy Young Player of the Year award. The season culminated with triumph over Middlesbrough in the FA Youth Cup, in which Collett scored a goal in the first leg of the final at the Riverside Stadium.

A week after the team's FA Youth Cup triumph, Collett was selected for a reserve team game against Middlesbrough on 1 May 2003. However, following a tackle by Middlesbrough's Gary Smith, his leg was broken in two places and he was replaced by Kieran Richardson. The injury eventually forced Collett's retirement from football, after spells with the New Zealand Knights and AGOVV Apeldoorn. In May 2008, he began legal proceedings against Smith and Middlesbrough, with his solicitors (Jan Levinson and Andrew Vickerstaff) and Richard Hartley QC and Jonathan Boyle as barristers. Levinson had previously prosecuted on behalf of Gordon Watson in the first £1 million football injury compensation claim.

The case was won in August 2008, and Collett was awarded an initial sum of £4.3 million in compensation, with the total "unlikely to be less than £4.5 million". Alex Ferguson, Brian McClair, Howard Wilkinson and Gary Neville attended the hearing, where they claimed that Collett was an "A-Class" footballer and had every chance of being a first team regular at Manchester United and a household name.

== Honours ==
Individual

- Jimmy Murphy Young Player of the Year: 2002–03
