= Darren Bazeley =

English footballer and coach (born 1972)

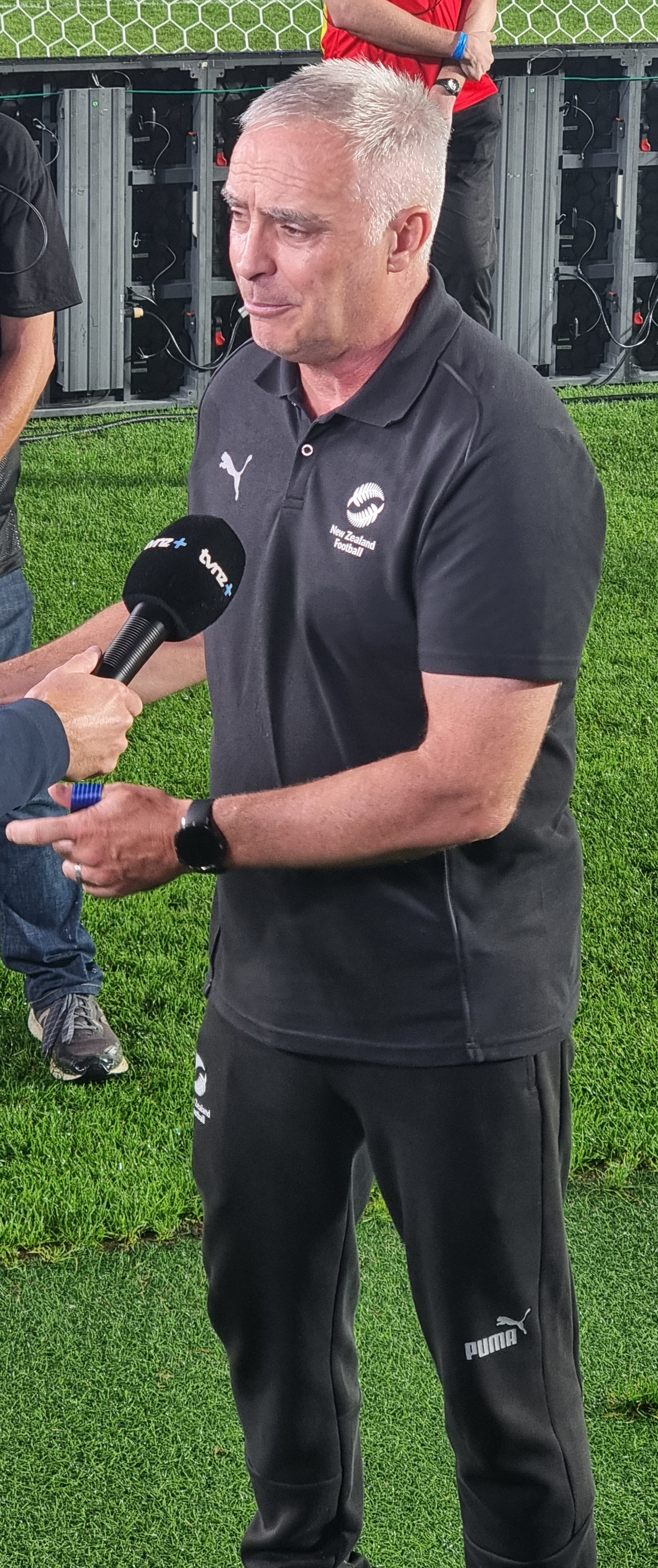
- Bazeley coaching the All Whites in March 2026.

Personal information
- Full name: Darren Shaun Bazeley
- Date of birth: 5 October 1972 (age 54)
- Place of birth: Northampton, England
- Height: 1.80 m (5 ft 11 in)
- Position: Right back

Youth career
- 1986–1991: Watford

Senior career*
Years	Team	Apps	(Gls)
1989–1999	Watford	283	(21)
1999–2002	Wolverhampton Wanderers	70	(4)
2002–2004	Walsall	89	(0)
2005–2007	New Zealand Knights	41	(0)
2007–2008	Waitakere United	17	(1)
Total		456	(26)

International career
1992	England U21	1	(0)

Managerial career
- 2011–2013: New Zealand U17
- 2013–2015: Wanderers SC
- 2013–2017: New Zealand U20
- 2020–2022: New Zealand U20
- 2022–: New Zealand U23
- 2023–2026: New Zealand
- * Club domestic league appearances and goals

Darren Shaun Bazeley (born 5 October 1972) is an English professional football coach and former player who played as either a right back or midfielder. He was most recently the head coach of the New Zealand national team and the national under-23 team.

== Playing career ==
=== Watford ===
Bazeley was born in Northampton, England, and began playing football at a young age with local team Northampton Orion. From 11 to 13 years old, Bazeley attended weekly training sessions with the School of Excellence – a coaching scheme run by the FA. It was through these sessions that Bazeley was scouted by Watford, trialling with them before signing at the age of 14. Watford's youth team coach Colin Lee was appointed the club's manager in March 1990 and he gave Bazeley his first-team debut in the final match of the 1989–90 season, bringing the 17-year-old on as a substitute against Hull City. Bazeley made 10 appearances in the 1990–91 campaign, all bar two as a substitute, and none after Lee was replaced by Steve Perryman in November 1990.

Bazeley signed his first professional contract prior to the start of the 1991–92 season and in September 1991 scored his first senior goal in a 3–0 win away at Barnsley. He finished the campaign with a total of seven goals from his 38 appearances. At the end of the season, Bazeley made his only appearance for the England under-21 team, playing 20 minutes in a 2–2 friendly draw against Hungary. Bazeley played 26 matches in the 1992–93 season, half of them from the bench. Watford began the following season under a new manager in Glenn Roeder, but a medial collateral ligament saw Bazeley only make a total of 10 appearances in the campaign. He was a more frequent presence in 1994–95, making 37 appearances and scoring four goals - a hatrick in 4–0 win at Southend United in early February and one in the subsequent match, a 2–0 home win over Burnley.

Bazeley was a regular in the side in the following two seasons, making over 40 league appearances in each. The 1995–96 season saw Watford relegated in the final match of the campaign, before finishing 13th in the Second Division the following year. In 1997–98, Bazeley only made three appearances before 28 February, but after returning to the side with two substitute appearances he would start every remaining match as Watford won the league title under manager Graham Taylor. Having appeared sporadically initially in 1998–99, Bazeley was an ever present from 20 October as Watford reached the First Division play-offs. Bazeley played the full match in both semi-final legs against Birmingham City, scoring the fourth penalty in Watford's shootout victory, and in the final at Wembley, which Watford won 2–0 to gain promotion to the Premiership.

=== Wolverhampton Wanderers ===
In the summer of 1999, Bazeley rejected a new contract at Watford. He chose to move on a free transfer to First Division club Wolverhampton Wanderers, who were managed by Colin Lee. He played every minute of every league match for Wolves in the 1999–2000 season. On 23 December 2000, he twisted his knee and tore cartilage in a match against Sheffield Wednesday. The match would prove to be his last for Wolves, as the injury kept him out of the remainder of the season and all of the 2001–02 campaign. In total, Bazeley made 80 appearances for the club, scoring four goals.

=== Walsall ===
In July 2002, Bazeley moved to First Division club Walsall, again working under Lee. Bazeley won the fans' "best new signing" award in 2002–03 season as Walsall finished 17th, their highest-place finish for 41 years. The club suffered relegation in 2003–04 and Bazeley left Walsall in November 2004. He had made 100 appearances for the club and was later described as "one of the best attacking fullbacks the Saddlers ever had."

=== New Zealand Knights ===
Bazeley signed with the re-invented New Zealand Knights for the new Australian A-League, alongside former Wolves and Walsall teammate Neil Emblen. Bazeley played every minute of the club's 21 A-League matches in the 2005–06 season, and took over the captaincy from Danny Hay when the defender transferred to Perth Glory mid-season. Bazeley stayed with the Knights for 2006–07 until the club's dissolution.

Bazeley played for Waitakere United in the New Zealand Football Championship in 2007–08 season, winning the league title. He also represented the club at the 2007 FIFA Club World Cup in Japan, where Waitakere lost 3–1 in the play-off round to Iranian side Sepahan.

== Coaching career ==
Bazeley holds the UEFA A License.

=== Waitakere United ===
In 2008, Bazeley became head coach of Waitakere United youth team. He became assistant of the club's senior team in June 2009, working under his former Wolves teammate Emblen, the side's head coach. The club winning the New Zealand Football Championship for all three seasons.

=== New Zealand set-up ===
In 2009, Bazeley was appointed assistant coach for the New Zealand U-17 national team. The side played at the 2009 FIFA U-17 World Cup in Nigeria, reaching the competition's knock-out stages for the first time. Having continued in the role through the 2011 FIFA U-17 World Cup in Mexico, where the side again reached the knock-out phases, Bazeley was appointed head coach of the team in June 2012. In April 2013 his side won all five matches at the 2013 OFC U-17 Championship to qualify for the 2013 FIFA U-17 World Cup in the United Arab Emirates.

In September 2013, Bazeley was appointed as head coach of the New Zealand U-20 national team, but he remained in charge of the U-17s for the World Cup the following month, in which New Zealand lost all three matches to finish bottom of their group. New Zealand were the host nation of the 2015 FIFA U-20 World Cup and so did not need to qualify. During the build-up to the tournament, Bazeley was appointed head coach of Wanderers SC, an U-20-side competing in the senior New Zealand Football Championship, while in March 2015 he worked as assistant coach of the New Zealand national team for the first time.

At the 2015 U-20 World Cup, New Zealand beat Myanmar 5–1 in their final group game, their first ever win in the competition. They qualified for the knock-out stages as one of the best-ranked third-place teams, the first time they had reached that stage in the competition. In the round of 16 they lost 2–1 to Portugal, who scored an 87th-minute winner.

Bazeley led the U-20 team to a victory at 2016 OFC U-20 Championship in Vanuatu, qualifying for the 2017 FIFA U-20 World Cup in South Korea. At the finals Bazeley's side again reached the knock-out stages, finishing second in their group and securing a 3–1 win against Honduras. They were defeated 6–0 in the round of 16 by the United States.

Bazeley continued to work with the senior side as they won at the 2016 OFC Nations Cup and played at the 2017 FIFA Confederations Cup in Russia. In September 2017 the side won the third round of OFC qualifying to reach the OFC–CONMEBOL play-off. New Zealand lost the two-legged play-off, held in November 2017, 2–0 on aggregate to Peru to miss out on qualification for the 2018 FIFA World Cup. By the time of the play-off, Bazeley was the only assistant coach working with head coach Anthony Hudson, following the departures of Peter Taylor and Alex Armstrong.

=== Colorado Rapids ===
Following the play-off defeat Hudson was appointed head coach of Major League Soccer side Colorado Rapids and in December 2017 Bazeley was appointed his assistant head coach.

=== Newcastle Jets and return to New Zealand set-up ===
In April 2020 Bazeley joined A-League side Newcastle Jets as assistant coach to his former Wolves teammate Carl Robinson. In October 2020 he left the role to return to the position of New Zealand U-20 head coach and assistant coach of the national and Olympic sides. Bazeley cited the travel conditions as a result of the COVID-19 pandemic and his family in New Zealand as factors in his departure from Newcastle.

== Career statistics ==
Appearances and goals by club, season and competition
Club	Season	League			FA Cup		League Cup		Other		Total	
Club	Season	Division	Apps	Goals	Apps	Goals	Apps	Goals	Apps	Goals	Apps	Goals
Watford	1989–90	Second Division					2	0				
Watford	1990–91	Second Division			3	0	2	0				
Watford	1991–92	Second Division			1	0	2	1				
Watford	1992–93	First Division					2	0				
Watford	1993–94	First Division										
Watford	1994–95	First Division			5	0	2	0				
Watford	1995–96	First Division	41	1	3	0	3	1	—		47	2
Watford	1996–97	Second Division	41	3	4	3	3	0	3 (Note: Appearances in EFL Trophy)	1	51	7
Watford	1997–98	Second Division	16	3	0	0	0	0	0	0	16	3
Watford	1998–99	First Division	40	2	1	0	2	0	3 (Note: Appearances in EFL play-offs)	0	46	2
Watford	Total											
Wolverhampton Wanderers	1999–2000	First Division	46	3	3	0	2	0	—		51	3
Wolverhampton Wanderers	2000–01	First Division	24	1	0	0	5	0	—		29	1
Wolverhampton Wanderers	2001–02	First Division	0	0	0	0	0	0	—		0	0
Wolverhampton Wanderers	Total		70	4	3	0	7	0	0	0	80	4
Walsall	2002–03	First Division	43	0	4	0	3	0	—		50	0
Walsall	2003–04	First Division	39	0	1	0	2	0	—		42	0
Walsall	2004–05	League One	7	0	0	0	0	0	1	0	8	0
Walsall	Total		89	0	5	0	5	0	1	0	100	0
New Zealand Knights	2005–06	A-League	21	0	—		—		—		21	0
New Zealand Knights	2006–07	A-League	20	0	—		—		—		20	0
New Zealand Knights	Total		41	0	0	0	0	0	0	0	41	0
Waitakere United	2007–08	Premiership	17	2	—		—		7 (Note: Five appearances in OFC Champions League; one appearance in New Zealand Football Championship play-offs; one appearances in FIFA Club World Cup)	0	24	2
Career total												

== Personal life ==
Bazeley became a New Zealand citizen in 2015, retaining his British citizenship.

== Managerial statistics ==
As of match played 15 November 2026

Managerial record by team and tenure
Team	Nat.	From	To	Record					Ref.
Team	Nat.	From	To	G	W	D	L	Win %	Ref.
New Zealand U17	(New Zealand)	1 July 2012	31 October 2013	8	5	0	3	62.50	
Wanderers SC	(New Zealand)	1 November 2013	30 June 2015	30	6	4	20	20.00	
New Zealand U20	(New Zealand)	1 November 2013	2 December 2017	16	8	3	5	50.00	
New Zealand U20	(New Zealand)	6 October 2020	31 December 2022	10	7	1	2	70.00	
New Zealand	(New Zealand)	1 November 2022	15 November 2026	42	16	9	17	38.10	
New Zealand U23	(New Zealand)	1 November 2022	15 November 2026	9	6	0	3	66.67	
Career Total				115	48	17	50	41.74	

== Honours ==
=== As a player ===
Watford

- Football League First Division play-offs: 1999
- Football League Second Division: 1997–98

=== As a manager ===
New Zealand U-20

- OFC U-20 Championship: 2016

New Zealand

- OFC Nations Cup: 2024
