= Campbell Banks =

New Zealand footballer

Campbell Banks Jr.
Personal information
- Full name: Campbell Banks
- Date of birth: 23 November 1978 (age 47)
- Place of birth: New Zealand
- Height: 1.90 m (6 ft 3 in)
- Position: Striker

Team information
- Current team: Nelson Suburbs

Youth career
- Barcelona Academy

Senior career*
Years	Team	Apps	(Gls)
?	Nelson Suburbs	28	(11)
?	Miramar Rangers		
?	Central United		
2001–2002	Football Kingz	16	(3)
?	Nelson Suburbs		
2005–2006	YoungHeart Manawatu		
2006	New Zealand Knights FC	2	(0)
2007–2008	Green Gully Cavaliers	41	(9)
2009	Sunshine George Cross	4	(0)
2009–2010	YoungHeart Manawatu	13	(5)
2010–2016	Wairarapa United		
2016–	Nelson Suburbs		

International career^{‡}
2006	New Zealand	3	(1)
- * Club domestic league appearances and goals as of 29 April 2010 ‡ National team caps and goals as of 12 June 2009

Campbell Banks (born 23 November 1978) is a New Zealand footballer. He has represented New Zealand at international level.

== Club career ==
Banks played for Nelson Suburbs, Miramar Rangers and Central United in the National League before joining the Football Kingz in the Australian NSL. He was released by the Kingz and returned to the National League, but later rejoined their reincarnation, New Zealand Knights FC, making two appearances in 2006 He was released by New Zealand Knights FC in 2006 and joined Green Gully Cavaliers. He played for Sunshine George Cross in the Victorian Premier League in Australia during the 09–10 season before returning to New Zealand. There, he played for YoungHeart Manawatu in the ASB Premiership, along with Wairarapa United during the winter season.

== International career ==
Banks scored on his full All Whites debut in a 2–1 win over Malaysia on 23 February 2006 making two further appearances in that series.
