= Hamza Mohammed =

Ghanaian footballer (born 1980)

Personal information
- Date of birth: 5 November 1980 (age 45)
- Place of birth: Kumasi, Ghana
- Position: Midfielder

Senior career*
Years	Team	Apps	(Gls)
1997–2002	Real Tamale United		
2002	Asante Kotoko		
2003	Real Tamale United		
2004	King Faisal Babes		
2005–2006	Real Tamale United		
2007	New Zealand Knights	2	(0)
2007–2008	Ceahlăul Piatra Neamț	19	(0)
2008–2009	Hearts of Oak		
2009–2011	King Faisal Babes		

International career
1999	Ghana U20	4	(0)
1999–2006	Ghana	27	(1)
- * Club domestic league appearances and goals

Hamza Mohammed (born 5 November 1980) is a Ghanaian former professional footballer who played as a midfielder. He played for Real Tamale United for eight years before joining Kumasi Asante Kotoko in 2002. Mohammed also featured for the Ghana Black Starlets, Black Satellites, Black Meteors, and the Black Stars. He captained the Black Satellites in 1999 and was in the Black Stars squad that took part in the 2006 and 2002 African Cup of Nations. Mohammed was deputy captain of the Black Starlets squad for the 1997 FIFA U-17 World Championship. Mohammed is currently the Head Coach of Ghana Division One League club Tamale City Football Club.

== Club career ==
Mohammed started his football career in 1994 with Real Republicans, a juvenile soccer academy in Tamale and later joined the Real Tamale United in 1996. In 2002 he joined Kumasi Asante Kotoko but left in 2003 to join their city rivals Kumasi King Faisal. In 2009 he joined Accra Hearts of Oak.

After leaving New Zealand Knights FC, Mohammed had trials with Rennes, Hapoel Be'er Sheva, Leeds United, Dundee United and St Johnstone but was deemed to be too short of match fitness to secure himself a contract. On 10 August 2007, Hamza signed a three-year contract with Romanian Divizia A side club CSM Ceahlăul Piatra Neamț and joined in summer 2009 back to Ghana to sign for King Faisal Babes who scores one goal in the first two matches

== International career ==
While with Real Tamale United, Mohammed was selected to join the Ghana Under-15 team at the Wineba Sports Academy in 1996.

Mohammed was member of the Ghana national under-20 football team at 1999 FIFA World Youth Championship in Nigeria. Then was part of the Ghanaian 2002 and 2006 African Nations Cup teams. Mohammed played all the 2006 FIFA World Cup Qualifiers but was dropped from the squad after Ghana qualified which brought about some public criticisms.
