= Jeff Fleming =

New Zealand footballer (born 1979)

Personal information
- Full name: Jeffrey Fleming
- Date of birth: 8 September 1979 (age 47)
- Place of birth: New Zealand
- Height: 1.82 m (5 ft 11 1/2 in)
- Position: Midfielder

Team information
- Current team: Preston Lions (assistant coach)

Youth career
- Dunedin Technical

Senior career*
Years	Team	Apps	(Gls)
2001–2004	Green Gully	84	(4)
2004–2005	Canterbury United		
2005–2014	Green Gully	218	(10)
2006	→ New Zealand Knights (loan)	1	(0)
2015–2018	Avondale FC	104	(3)

International career^{‡}
2006	New Zealand	3	(0)

Managerial career
- 2026–: Preston Lions (assistant coach)
- * Club domestic league appearances and goals as of 24 September 2018 ‡ National team caps and goals as of 22 April 2024

Jeff Fleming (born 8 September 1979) is a footballer who plays as a midfielder for the National Premier Leagues side Avondale FC. Originally from Canterbury, he has represented the New Zealand national football team and made a single appearance for the New Zealand Knights in the A-League.

Fleming made his debut for the New Zealand national football team as a substitute in a 1–0 win against Malaysia on 19 February 2006.
