= Jonti Richter =

Australian soccer player

Personal information
- Full name: Jonathan Richter
- Date of birth: 12 April 1983 (age 43)
- Place of birth: Johannesburg, South Africa
- Height: 5 ft 7 in (1.70 m)
- Positions: Midfielder; forward

Senior career*
Years	Team	Apps	(Gls)
2002–2004	Northern Spirit	44	(7)
2005–2006	Queensland Roar	17	(1)
2006–2007	New Zealand Knights	18	(0)
2007	Manly United		
2007–2008	Tamworth		
2009–2016	Brisbane Strikers		
2018	Lions FC	2	(0)

International career^{‡}
2003	Australia U20		
Medal record
Representing Australia
Men's Association football
OFC U-20 Championship
Winner	2002 Fiji/Vanuatu
- * Club domestic league appearances and goals as of 12 September 2018 ‡ National team caps and goals as of 13 November 2009 (UTC)

See Jonathan Richter for the Danish footballer.

Jonathan Richter (born 12 April 1983 in Johannesburg, South Africa) is an Australian footballer who currently plays for Queensland State League side Brisbane Strikers as a midfielder.

== Playing career ==
=== Northern Spirit ===
Jonti started his career with Australian club Northern Spirit of the old National Soccer League in 2002.

Richter spent two seasons with Northern Spirit, in which he made 44 appearances, finding the net on seven occasions.

Jonti became a free agent when the club enduring major financial problems, and the club folded at the end of the 2003/2004 National Soccer League season.

=== Queensland Roar ===
Richter was picked up by newly formed A-League club Queensland Roar in time for the start of the new 2005 in A-League.

Jonti spent the whole season with Queensland Roar, making 17 appearances and scoring one goal.

=== New Zealand Knights ===
Jonti's next venture was with A-League club New Zealand Knights, who he joined for the 2006 season.

Richter made 18 appearances, but failed to score, and found himself without a club when New Zealand Knights became defunct.

He and several other players were locked in a legal battle with the now defunct New Zealand Knights owners, Soccer New Zealand, and the Football Federation of Australia over lost wages. The latter two took over the running of the club for the remainder of the 2006-2007 A-league season. With the advice of the Australian Professional Footballers' Association and FIFPro there was no action taken against any party due to court and legal costs as well as lack of enough evidence to gain a positive result for the players.

=== Manly United ===
Jonti failed to find a new club in the A-League and joined New South Wales Premier League side Manly United.

Richter failed to settle with Manly United and at the end of the season, he returned to his hometown of Brisbane in October 2007.

=== Tamworth ===
Jonti joined Conference North side Tamworth on 30 October 2007, along with former Tamworth old boy Graeme Law, who joined on a months loan from Conference National side Farsley Celtic.

Richter knew Tamworth manager Gary Mills who tried to sign the young winger while he was on trial with Mills' former club Notts County, and hopes with the guidance of his new boss, Jonti can make a name for himself in the English game.

Richter played on and off throughout the season for Tamworth, he left at the end of the 2007/08 season, following the end of his contract.

=== Brisbane Strikers ===
Richter now plays for Hyundai Queensland State League side Brisbane Strikers, The Brisbane Strikers are coached by Richter's former Queensland Roar teammate Stuart McLaren.

Jonti had returned to Australia after he sustained a serious foot injury while playing in the England with Conference North Side Tamworth, which has kept him from the field for almost 18 months.

== International career ==
=== Australia U20 ===
Richter has represented Australia U20's in the 2003 FIFA World Youth Championship.

== Honours ==
Australia U-20

- OFC U-19 Men's Championship: 2002
