= Jeremy Christie =

New Zealand footballer (born 1983)

Personal information
- Full name: Jeremy John Christie
- Date of birth: 22 May 1983 (age 43)
- Place of birth: Whangārei, New Zealand
- Height: 5 ft 10 in (1.78 m)
- Position: Central midfielder

Senior career*
Years	Team	Apps	(Gls)
1999	Northland		
1999–2004	Barnsley	6	(0)
2004–2005	Football Kingz	28	(5)
2005–2006	New Zealand Knights	21	(4)
2006–2007	Perth Glory	19	(0)
2007–2009	Wellington Phoenix	34	(0)
2009	Waitakere United		
2010–2011	FC Tampa Bay	18	(2)
2013	Waitakere United		

International career^{‡}
1999	New Zealand U-17	25	(0)
2001–2003	New Zealand U-20	13	(3)
2001–2005	New Zealand U-23	13	(1)
2005–2013	New Zealand	27	(1)
- * Club domestic league appearances and goals as of 11 September 2011 ‡ National team caps and goals as of 21 January 2014

Jeremy John Christie (born 22 May 1983) is a New Zealand former footballer who played as a midfielder.

Christie specialises in central midfield and as a defender. Christie was part of the selected All Whites squad which competed at the 2010 FIFA World Cup.

== Career ==
=== Club ===
Christie has played for a number of teams since making his professional debut in 1999. He has played with Barnsley FC, Football Kingz, New Zealand Knights, Perth Glory and Wellington Phoenix.

Christie signed with A-league expansion club Wellington Phoenix from Perth Glory for the start of the 2007–08 season and joined up with fellow All Whites Shane Smeltz, Glen Moss, Tim Brown and Mark Paston. He made 27 appearances in two seasons with the Phoenix before leaving at the conclusion of the 2008–09 season.

Christie then went in search of regular playing time to boost his All Whites selection chances for the 2010 FIFA World Cup and signed with FC Tampa Bay of the North American Soccer League on 21 January 2010. Christie made his first team debut in their opening match of the 2010 season – a 1–0 home win over Crystal Palace Baltimore F.C. in which he provided the game-winning goal assist.

Christie scored his first goal for Tampa Bay in a 2–2 draw with Austin Aztex FC, an 86th minute penalty kick to tie the game in front of a sell-out home crowd.

Christie missed most of the 2011 season for FC Tampa Bay due to hip surgery he had undertaken during the off season. At the conclusion of the 2011 season Christie left FC Tampa Bay. Christie played in the ASB Premiership in New Zealand's top flight competition for Waitakere United in at least two separate spells from 2004 onwards.

=== International ===
Christie was selected to captain the New Zealand U-17 squad for the 1999 FIFA U-17 World Cup which was hosted by New Zealand and played in all three group stage matches against Poland, Uruguay and the United States. Christie has also earned national representation at U-20 and U-23 level between 2001 and 2005.

Christie made his All Whites senior debut with a substitute appearance in a 0–1 loss to Australia on 9 June 2005 at Craven Cottage. He was named as part of the 2009 FIFA Confederations Cup New Zealand squad to travel to South Africa, playing in all three pool matches against Spain, South Africa and Iraq.

On 10 May 2010, Christie was named in New Zealand's final 23-man squad to compete at the 2010 FIFA World Cup. and appeared as a second-half substitute in New Zealand's first two games which both resulted in 1–1 draws with Slovakia and 2006 World Champions Italy.

== Career statistics ==
=== International ===
==== International goals ====
International goals
#	Date	Opponent	Final Score	Result	Competition
1	10 September 2008	New Caledonia	3–0	Win	2008 OFC Nations Cup
Last updated 12 April 2010

== See also ==
- List of New Zealand international footballers
- List of New Zealand Knights FC players
- List of Perth Glory FC players
- List of Wellington Phoenix FC players
