= Che Bunce =

New Zealand footballer

Personal information
- Full name: Che Bunce
- Date of birth: 29 August 1975 (age 51)
- Place of birth: Auckland, New Zealand
- Height: 1.91 m (6 ft 3 in)
- Position: Centre back

Team information
- Current team: Waikato

Senior career*
Years	Team	Apps	(Gls)
1992–1994	Sheffield United	0	(0)
1994–1995	Napier City Rovers	?	(?)
1996–1997	Melville United	?	(?)
1997	Crewe Alexandra	0	(0)
1997–1999	Breiðablik	40	(1)
1999–2002	Football Kingz	43	(2)
2001	→Breiðablik	9	(1)
2003	Drogheda United	?	(1)
2003–2004	Randers FC	19	(2)
2004–2006	Waikato	?	(3)
2006–2007	New Zealand Knights	19	(1)
2007	Coventry City	0	(0)
2007	Navua	?	(0)
2008	Waikato	5	(0)
2008	Melville United	?	(?)
2008–2009	Hawke's Bay United	10	(2)
2009	Melville United	18	(12)
2009–2011	Waikato	?	(?)

International career^{‡}
1998–2007	New Zealand	29	(2)
Medal record
Representing New Zealand
Men's Association football
OFC Nations Cup
Winner	1998 Australia
Runner-up	2000 Tahiti
Third place	2004 Australia
AFC–OFC Challenge Cup
Runner-up	2003 Iran
- * Club domestic league appearances and goals as of 10 April 2009 ‡ National team caps and goals as of 11:20, 12 May 2013 (GMT)

Che Bunce (born 29 August 1975 in Auckland) is a New Zealand footballer was a player-coach for Waikato FC in the NZFC. He is a lawyer by trade.

== Club career ==
In April 2006 he signed for New Zealand Knights where he was captain for the A-League 2006-07 season.

Bunce was on trial at Scottish Premier League side Dundee United in late January 2007, and despite being expected to join the Terrors, joined Coventry City instead. Bunce failed to make an appearance for City and was told in April 2007 that he was free to leave the Ricoh Arena at the end of the season.

== International career ==
Bunce played for the New Zealand U-23 and made 29 appearances for the New Zealand national football team, the All Whites from 1998, scoring 2 goals.,

His last appearance was on 24 March 2007 when the All Whites endured an embarrassing 4–0 loss to Costa Rica.

== Honours ==
New Zealand

- OFC Nations Cup: 1998; Runner-up, 2000; 3rd place, 2004
- AFC–OFC Challenge Cup: Runner-up, 2003
