= John Tambouras =

Australian soccer player

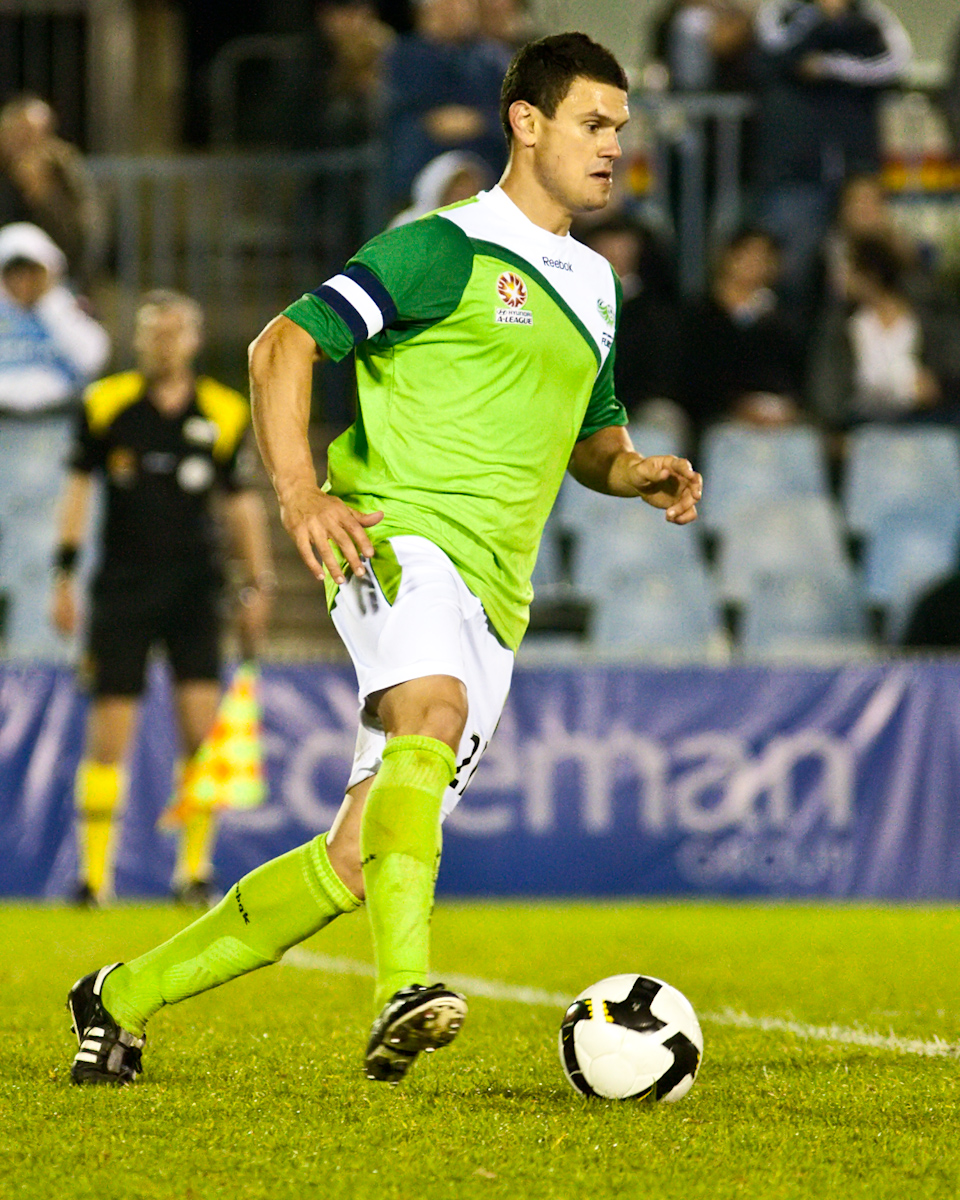

Personal information
- Full name: John Tambouras
- Date of birth: 30 January 1979 (age 47)
- Place of birth: Darwin, Australia
- Height: 1.85 m (6 ft 1 in)
- Position: Centre back

Senior career*
Years	Team	Apps	(Gls)
1998–1999	South Melbourne	1	(0)
2000–2001	Kalamata	14	(0)
2003–2004	Football Kingz	21	(1)
2005–2006	New Zealand Knights	18	(0)
2006	Pahang	26	(2)
2006–2007	New Zealand Knights	3	(1)
2007–2008	Drogheda United	32	(1)
2008–2009	Neftchi Baku	3	(0)
2009–2010	North Queensland Fury	16	(1)
2010	Guangzhou Evergrande	2	(0)
- * Club domestic league appearances and goals

John Tambouras (born 30 January 1979 in Darwin, Australia) is a retired Australian footballer.

== Club career ==
Tambouras attracted the attention of South Melbourne F.C. who signed him on as a teenager, giving him his first experience of playing in a semi-professional environment.

He later moved to Greece, the country of his parents, joining Kalamata. During his time with the club, he played against Olympiacos in the Intertoto Cup which was drawn 1–1.

Following his time in Greece, he was signed by New Zealand's only professional side, the Auckland Kingz for the 2003–2004 Australian NSL season where he won the club's "Player of the Year" award.

The following season saw him play in the new A-League with the New Zealand Knights but departed at the end of the season.

After his first season in the A-League, he joined Malaysian side Pahang, contributing to their FA Cup victory on penalties. With the Malaysian season over, he briefly returned to the New Zealand Knights.

In January 2007, Tambouras trailled with FC Universitatea Craiova in Romania but did not secure a position. Later that year, he was offered a contract with Irish club Drogheda United in July. Whilst at Drogheda, he played in the Uefa Cup qualifying rounds and helped the club win the Fai Eircom League of Ireland for the first time in the club's history.

After leaving Drogheda, he moved to Azerbaijan for a week-long trial at Neftchi Baku, this resulted in him signing a three-year contract with the club.

In June 2009, Tambouras joined A-League's newest club, North Queensland Fury for their debut in A-League season.

On 2 March 2010, Tambouras went on trial, and then accepted a deal, from Chinese second division outfit Guangzhou Evergrande to play in the upcoming season. He made his China League One debut for Guangzhou against Pudong Zobon on 10 April. Tambouras was released in June after playing two matches for Guangzhou.

== Coaching ==
As of October 2010, Tambouras was appointed as the skills acquisition trainer for the Northern Territory, a role set up and partly funded by FFA. He works primarily with players ages 9 to 13, teaching them the National Curriculum.

== Honours ==
With South Melbourne:

- NSL Championship: 1997–1998, 1998–1999

With Pahang FA:

- Malaysia FA Cup: 2005–2006

With Drogheda United:

- League of Ireland: 2007
