= Malik Buari =

Ghanaian footballer

Personal information
- Date of birth: 21 January 1984 (age 42)
- Place of birth: Accra, Ghana
- Height: 1.81 m (5 ft 11 1/2 in)
- Positions: Defender; midfielder

Senior career*
Years	Team	Apps	(Gls)
2003–2005	Fulham	3	(0)
2005–2006	Woking	7	(0)
2006–2007	New Zealand Knights	19	(2)
2007	St Albans City	13	(0)
2007–2008	Sutton United	4	(0)
2009–?	Chessington & Hook United	41	(20)

International career
- England U15
- England U16
- * Club domestic league appearances and goals

Malik Buari (born 21 January 1984) is a former professional football midfielder and left-sided defender. He has represented England in international youth squads.

== Club career ==
Buari was formerly at Fulham, making his debut in the Premier League against Everton on 23 August 2003. He played five first team games for Fulham before moving to Woking on a free transfer.

=== New Zealand Knights ===
Buari was one of the many signings made by new coach Paul Nevin intended to help improve on the disastrous inaugural A-League season. Buari impressed in pre-season but he really made a name for himself in Round Two. The Knights had held Adelaide United at 0–0 for the whole match when in the 88th minute, Buari released a 25-metre thunderbolt which went straight into the top corner to win the game and also secure the Knights first home win ever.

== International career ==
Buari made a handful of appearances for England under-15s and under-16s.
