= Noah Hickey =

New Zealand footballer (born 1978)

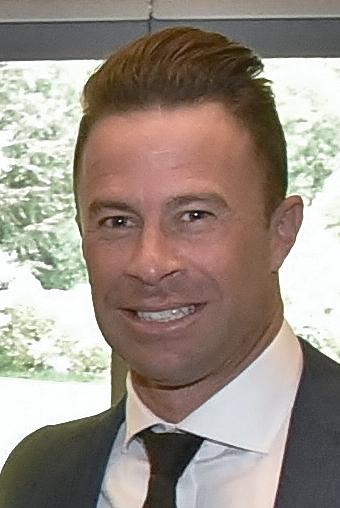
- Hickey in 2017

Personal information
- Full name: Noah Hickey
- Date of birth: 9 June 1978 (age 48)
- Place of birth: Auckland, New Zealand
- Height: 1.75 m (5 ft 9 in)
- Position: Right winger

Youth career
- Eastern Suburbs

Senior career*
Years	Team	Apps	(Gls)
1996–1998	Central United		
1999–2001	The Football Kingz	15	(0)
2001–2003	Tampere United	42	(13)
2003–2004	The Football Kingz	7	(3)
2004–2005	Waitakere United		
2005–2007	New Zealand Knights	35	(2)
2007–	Gisborne City		

International career
1997–2007	New Zealand	33	(3)
- * Club domestic league appearances and goals

Noah Hickey (born 9 June 1978) is a New Zealand former footballer who last played for Gisborne City in the Central Premier League and last played professionally for the New Zealand Knights in the Hyundai A-League. He played as either a striker or a right-winger and was an established member of the New Zealand national team, the 'All Whites'.

== Biography ==
He was the 1997 New Zealand Young Player of the Year, and has had trials with English teams Watford F.C. and Northampton Town F.C., perhaps due to his appearance in the 2003 Confederations Cup tournament. He also achieved numerous caps for the Eastern Suburbs first team, and was a regular goal scorer for the "White Demons".

Noah had a successful stint with Tampere United of Finland. He scored the goal that helped them win the league against MyPa, and also scored an infamous winner with his hand against rivals FC Haka.

He has presented a children's football show on Sky Sports in New Zealand. He is also infamous for missing an open goal in bizarre fashion, now featured on several 'bloopers' tapes. Noah Hickey has also appeared on NZ reality television show City Celebrity Country Nobody.

Noah's famous miss is featured in the football bloopers video "Nick Hancock's Football Hell". Noah is repeatedly referred to incorrectly as Noel Hickey during the remainder of the video (this is a mistake made by the commentator in the video clip, and not solely Hancock's error).

== International career ==
Hickey made his full All Whites debut in a 0–1 loss to Papua New Guinea on 31 May 1997. He was included in the New Zealand side for the 2003 Confederations Cup finals tournament.

On 28 May 2007 Hickey surprised many by retiring from International and pro football exactly 10 years to the day of his first cap. There have been suggestions that this came about due to a fallout with New Zealand and Wellington Phoenix manager, Ricki Herbert. This followed New Zealand's disastrous results in South America which Herbert blamed on player fitness and commitment.

Hickey ended his international playing career with 33 A-international caps and 3 goals to his credit, his final cap came in a 0–5 loss to Venezuela on 28 March 2007.

He is now Running the New Zealand stage of "Red Bull Balls to the Wall" A one on one competition with youth.

He was also the sports correspondent for More FM's nationwide drive show Josh and Tom, and had a weekly spot around about 6.30pm every Friday night.

Noah is also running schools programme run with AUT called Shine that aims to teach students not to worry about people knocking them when they are striving for their potential.

== Career statistics ==
=== International goals ===
#	Date	Venue	Opponent	Score	Result	Competition
1.	8 June 2001	North Harbour Stadium, Auckland, New Zealand	Cook Islands	1–0	2–0	2002 World Cup qualification
2.	8 June 2001	North Harbour Stadium, Auckland, New Zealand	Cook Islands	2–0	2–0	2002 World Cup qualification
3.	12 October 2002	A. Le Coq Arena, Tallinn, Estonia	Estonia	1–1	2–3	Friendly
Correct as of 7 October 2015
