= Neil Emblen =

English footballer (born 1971)

Personal information
- Full name: Neil Emblen
- Date of birth: 19 June 1971 (age 55)
- Place of birth: Bromley, England
- Height: 1.88 m (6 ft 2 in)
- Position: Central midfielder

Team information
- Current team: New Zealand, Colorado Rapids (assistant coach)

Senior career*
Years	Team	Apps	(Gls)
1987–1990	Tonbridge Angels	99	(12)
1992–1993	Sittingbourne	54	(2)
1993–1994	Millwall	12	(0)
1994–1997	Wolverhampton Wanderers	89	(9)
1997–1998	Crystal Palace	13	(0)
1998–2001	Wolverhampton Wanderers	114	(7)
2001–2003	Norwich City	14	(0)
2003	→ Walsall (loan)	5	(0)
2003–2005	Walsall	75	(7)
2005–2007	New Zealand Knights	32	(3)
2007–2011	Waitakere United	42	(5)
2013–2014	Western Springs		

Managerial career
- 2009–2012: Waitakere United (player-coach)
- 2012: New Zealand U23
- 2012–2013: New Zealand (assistant coach)
- 2013–2017: Western Springs
- 2014: New Zealand (interim head coach)
- 2018–2022: Colorado Rapids (assistant coach)
- 2019–2022: New Zealand (assistant coach)
- * Club domestic league appearances and goals

Neil Emblen (born 19 June 1971) is an English former professional footballer who is the assistant coach of Colorado Rapids and New Zealand.

He has served as assistant head coach of New Zealand under Ricki Herbert and of Anthony Hudson, and was briefly the interim head coach prior to Hudson's appointment. He was the head coach of the New Zealand U23's during the 2012 Summer Olympics.

He spent the majority of his career in English football with Millwall, Wolverhampton Wanderers, Crystal Palace, Norwich City and Walsall, before moving to New Zealand.

== Club career ==
Emblen started his career as a youth player at Tonbridge Angels before moving to Sittingbourne and then Millwall for a fee of £210,000 including Michael Harle. After spending a year with the Lions, Emblen was sold to Wolverhampton Wanderers for £600,000, where he would become a regular during his three years at Molineux.

A £2,000,000 move to Crystal Palace beckoned in 1997 but would last just one season, and in 1998, after scoring two goals for Palace in the FA Cup against Scunthorpe United, Emblen moved back to Wolves in exchange for the West Midlands club writing off the remainder of the £2million still owed as part of the initial transfer. Emblen's second three-year spell saw him gain favour with the Wolves fans as he made the attacking midfield role his own. It ended in 2001 when he moved to Norwich City for £500,000.

Emblen started just six games in a two-year spell with the Canaries because of chronic knee injury problems and spent the last few months of his contract on loan to Walsall (in two separate spells), whom he joined permanently on a two-year deal in June 2003. Upon leaving Walsall in 2005, Emblen moved to New Zealand to join the now-defunct New Zealand Knights. After the Knights ceased playing, Emblen moved to Waitakere United.

== Coaching career ==
Emblen was appointed player-coach of Waitakere United from 2009 to 2012, winning three successive ASB Premiership titles during his time at the club. In 2013, he was appointed in the same role at Western Springs, taking them from the Lotto Sport Italia NRFL Division 2 to the Lotto Sport Italia NRFL Premier within two years.

In 2012, he managed the New Zealand U23 team at the London Olympics. In 2014, he was named as the New Zealand interim head coach, taking charge of two matches; a 4–2 loss to Japan and a goalless draw with South Africa.

In February 2018 he was appointed by Anthony Hudson as assistant coach of Colorado Rapids where is still one of the assistant coaches.

== Personal life ==
His brother, Paul Emblen, was also a professional footballer, playing for Charlton Athletic and Wycombe Wanderers.
