= New Zealand Knights FC =

Former football club

New Zealand Knights
- Full name: New Zealand Knights Football Club Ltd
- Nickname: The Knights
- Founded: 2004; 22 years ago (from disestablished Football Kingz FC)
- Dissolved: 2007; 19 years ago
- Ground: North Harbour Stadium
Home colours	Away colours

New Zealand Knights Football Club (formed from the Football Kingz Football Club in 2004) were a New Zealand professional football club based in Albany, Auckland, that briefly played in the A-League, Australia's premier football competition. They have long since been replaced by Auckland FC.

== History ==
=== Kingz and the NSL 1999–2004 ===
Kingz logo

Football Kingz FC (promoted as "Auckland Kingz" within Australia) joined the Australian National Soccer League in 1999 and proceeded to play in the last five seasons of the NSL, failing to qualify for the playoffs in every season. The club was originally to use the spelling of "Kings", however this was changed to the Kingz after receiving legal threats from the Sydney Kings basketball franchise.

==== Restructuring Football Kingz into New Zealand Knights ====
The Football Kingz brand was disestablished in 2004 and was restructured into the New Zealand Knights as a new franchise for Australia's new national football competition called the A-League. Market research carried out by the club, to determine the viability of a new identity for the team, indicated that 76% of respondents were in favour of a name change. When that research was focused on those aged 35 and under, the percentage in favour of a change rose to 90%. Further to that, the name of "Knights" were polled best of all names suggested in the survey, a clear 30% higher than any other option.

The former Football Kingz FC General manager Guy Hedderwick was promoted to the role of New Zealand Knights chief executive officer. Alongside him Football Kingz and Waitakere City Chairman, Anthony Lee, became the New Zealand Knights Chairman in the restructuring.

Initially, Anthony Lee had invested into the New Zealand Knights, with his company's (Total Football Ltd) 20% shareholding second only to majority owner Brian Katzen's Octagon Sport (later included Maurice Cox as partner) with 60%. The other shareholders were Sky Television (5%), Chris Turner (10%), and New Zealand Soccer (non-cash 5%).

The only major sponsor the club had was retailer Zero's New Zealand (Sub Sandwiches). They agreed to a deal with the Knights over the first three seasons in a six figure deal as a sleeve sponsor.

New Zealand Knights was confirmed as one of the eight founding teams in the A-League. John Adshead, who took the All Whites to their first ever World Cup finals appearance in 1982, was named their inaugural manager. Former New Zealand international, Danny Hay, who previously played in the English Premiership with Leeds United was named the inaugural captain of the team.

=== New Zealand Knights A-League seasons 2005–2007 ===
Despite having a squad boasting several players with extensive experience in English football, many pundits did not rate the Knights as serious contenders for the A-League title, and they were considered favourites for the wooden spoon. These predictions turned out to be true, with New Zealand Knights proving to be well out of their depth in their debut A-League season.

In April 2006, after the poor season, manager John Adshead resigned from the club. Paul Nevin was confirmed as manager a month later, having worked as caretaker manager since the position was vacated by Adshead.

In late October 2006, as a result of low crowd attendance at North Harbour Stadium in Auckland and continual poor on-field performances, rumours began to circulate that Football Federation Australia (FFA) was considering the possibility of revoking the Knights' A-League licence and granting it to a new team that would be set to enter the competition in the 2007–08 season.

On 15 November, nearing the end of the transfer window, the board and management decided to relieve Paul Nevin of his coaching duties due to a string of poor performances.

On 13 December 2006, strong rumours resurfaced that the FFA was considering the revocation of the Knights' licence to compete in the A-League. It quickly became clear that, with five weeks remaining in the current season, the FFA fully intended to reclaim the licence from the Knights. The FFA had continued to express angst at low attendance numbers, poor on-field performance and the lack of domestically developed players.

Late on 14 December, the FFA announced that it had revoked the competition licence held by the Knights' owners. An arrangement with NZ Soccer would see the national body step in to manage the club for the remaining five weeks of the regular season, with former All Whites player Ricki Herbert to fill the role of head coach.

Effectively, the Knights dissolved on 21 January, when the final match of the season was played against Perth Glory FC.

On 19 March 2007 after several delays, Wellington Phoenix was selected as the successor to the New Zealand Knights.

==== A-League Seasonal Results ====
Season	Division	League										Top scorer	
Season	Division	P	W	D	L	F	A	GD	Pts	Pos	Finals	Name	Goals
2005–06	A-League	21	1	3	17	15	47	–32	6	8th	–	(New Zealand) Jeremy Brockie, (England) Simon Yeo	4
2006–07	A-League	21	5	4	12	13	39	–26	19	8th	–	(New Zealand) Noah Hickey, (England) Neil Emblen	2

== Stadium ==
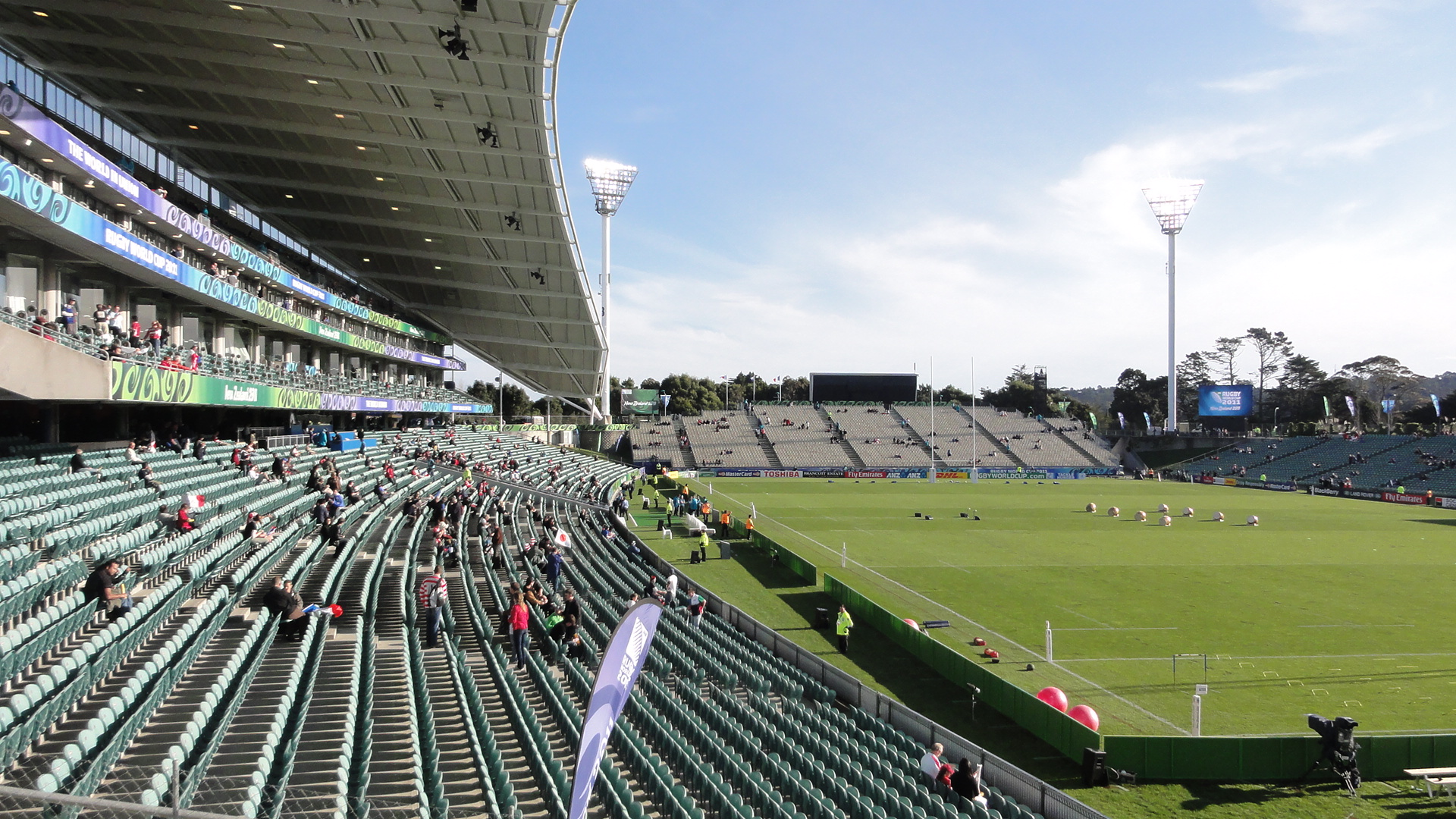
North Harbour Stadium, the former home of the New Zealand Knights

North Harbour Stadium is a rectangular stadium situated in Albany on Auckland's North Shore in New Zealand. It was opened in 1997 after nearly a decade of discussion, planning and construction.

North Harbour Stadium has four main seating areas with an official capacity of 25,000. 19,000 (76%) of this capacity is seated, and the other 6,000 are on grass embankments.

- Main Grandstand — A futuristic looking structure with a distinctive arched roof. It has three main tiers of seating, as well as a row of corporate boxes and several corporate lounges. A total of 12,000 can be seated, mostly under the roof. This is on the southern side of the ground.
- Open Stand — A single uncovered tier opposite the Main Grandstand that can seat 7,000.
- Embankments — At either end (East/West) of the ground, there is a single-tier grass embankment with a capacity of 3,000 people. The scoreboard is at the Western End, while the replay screen is directly opposite.

The stadium is lit with four 45 m tall light towers.

== Colours and badge ==
The Knights played in all-black strips, with a silver left sleeve. The change strip was white, with black shorts and white socks.

The badge was designed for the inaugural 2005–06 season and launched at the January 2005 press conference which highlighted the club name change.

== Supporters ==
The New Zealand Knights supporter base was known as Bloc 5.

Season	League	Average	High	Details
2006/2007	A-League	3,009	7,304	R1 – Newcastle Jets
2005/2006	A-League	3,989	9,827	R2 v Sydney FC

== Players ==
=== Former players ===
see List of New Zealand Knights FC players

==== Club Captains ====
- 2005 (New Zealand) Danny Hay
- 2006 (England) Darren Bazeley

== Manager history ==
Name	Nat	From	To	Record							
Name	Nat	From	To	P	W	D	L	F	A	GD	Pts
John Adshead	(New Zealand)	January 2005	April 2006	21	1	3	17	15	47	−32	6
Paul Nevin	(England)	May 2006	November 2006	12	2	1	9	4	26	−22	7
Barry Simmonds^{d}	(England)	November 2006	November 2006	4	0	2	2	3	8	−5	2
Ricki Herbert^{e}	(New Zealand)	December 2006	January 2007	5	3	1	1	6	5	1	10
Total		August 2005	January 2007	42	6	7	29	28	86	-58	25

== All Time League records ==
- Record Victory: 3–1 vs Queensland Roar (H), 29 December 2006
- Record Defeat: 0–5 vs Queensland Roar (A), 15 September 2006
- Highest League Crowd: 9,827 vs Sydney FC, 2 September 2005
- Lowest League Crowd: 1,632 vs Central Coast Mariners, 28 September 2006
- Winning Streak: 2 games (29 December 2006 – 7 January 2007)
- Undefeated Streak: 4 games (29 December 2006 – 21 January 2007)
- Losing Streak: 11 games (18 September 2005 – 1 December 2005)
- Winless Streak: 18 games (18 September 2005 – 2 September 2006)
- Goals in a game: 2 – Jeremy Brockie vs Newcastle Jets (H), 4 November 2005
- Goals in a season: 4 – Jeremy Brockie, Simon Yeo, 2005/06
- Most Assists in a season: 3 – Sean Devine, 2005/06
- All-time most Appearances: 41 – Darren Bazeley
- All-time Top Scorer: 4 – Jeremy Brockie and Simon Yeo

== Auckland's return to A-League ==
In spite of the fate of the Football Kingz FC and New Zealand Knights, there was ongoing hope within Auckland football community for a possible return for the New Zealand Knights, or another Auckland-based team, to re-join the A-League. Encouraging crowds of 20,078 in November 2011 when Wellington Phoenix played Adelaide United and 11,566 in January 2013 when Wellington Phoenix played Perth Glory, both held at Eden Park, added to the push for the addition of a second New Zealand team in the A-League.

In March 2023 the Australian Professional Leagues, the governing body for the A-League Men, confirmed plans for expansion with new teams to be based in Canberra and Auckland. Bill Foley, the founder of the Black Knight Football Club, which owns Premier League club AFC Bournemouth in the Premier League and a significant interest in FC Lorient and owner of the US National Hockey League team’s Vegas Golden Knights was awarded the Auckland licence. His team, Auckland FC began competing from the 2024–25 A-League season.

== See also ==
- Football Kingz FC
- Wellington Phoenix FC
- Auckland FC
- New Zealand Football
- Football Federation Australia
- A-League

== Notes ==
^{d} Caretaker manager after Paul Nevin was removed of coaching duties. ^{e} Caretaker manager for the remainder of the season before the club was to be defunct.
