= Enniskillen =

Town in County Fermanagh, Northern Ireland

Coordinates: 54°20′41″N 07°38′20″W

Enniskillen: Irish: Inis Ceithleann; Scots: Inniskillin
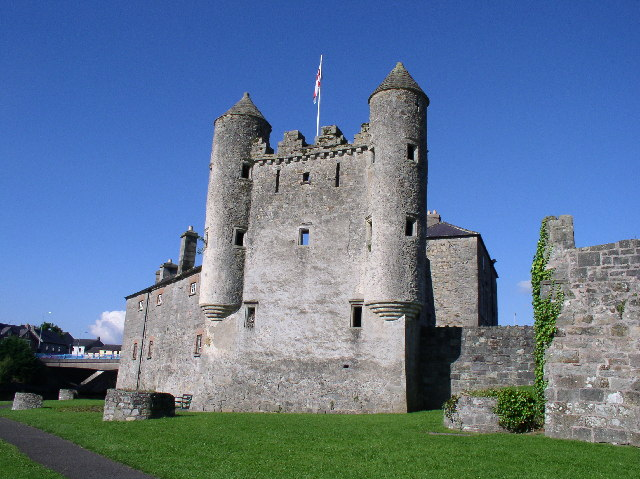
- Enniskillen castle

- Location within Northern Ireland
- Population: 14,086 (2021 census)
- Irish grid reference: H240440
  - Belfast: 88 miles (142 km)
  - Dublin: 89 mi (143 km)
- District: Fermanagh and Omagh
- County: County Fermanagh
- Country: Northern Ireland
- Sovereign state: United Kingdom
- Post town: ENNISKILLEN
- Postcode district: BT74, BT92-94
- Dialling code: 028
- Police: Northern Ireland
- Fire: Northern Ireland
- Ambulance: Northern Ireland
- UK Parliament: Fermanagh and South Tyrone
- NI Assembly: Fermanagh and South Tyrone
- Website: www.enniskillen.com

Enniskillen (/ˌɛnɪsˈkɪlən/ EN-iss-KIL-ən, from Irish: Inis Ceithleann [ˈɪnʲɪʃ ˈcɛlʲən̪ˠ], 'Ceithlenn's island') is the largest town in County Fermanagh, Northern Ireland. It is in the middle of the county, between the Upper and Lower sections of Lough Erne. It had a population of 14,086 at the 2021 census. Enniskillen Castle was built in the 15th century as a stronghold of the Maguires, before coming under English control in the early 17th century. The castle and town were expanded during the Plantation of Ulster. It was the seat of local government for the former Fermanagh District Council, and is the county town of Fermanagh. The town is in a civil parish of the same name.

== Toponymy ==
The town's name comes from the Irish: Inis Ceithleann. This refers to Cethlenn, a figure in Irish mythology who may have been a goddess. Local legend has it that Cethlenn was wounded in battle by an arrow and attempted to swim across the River Erne, which surrounds the island, but she never reached the other side, so the island was named in reference to her. It has been anglicised many ways over the centuries – Iniskellen, Iniskellin, Iniskillin, Iniskillen, Inishkellen, Inishkellin, Inishkillin, Inishkillen and so on.

== History ==
Historical population
Year	Pop.	±%
1821	1,563	—
1831	5,270	+237.2%
1841	8,453	+60.4%
1851	8,642	+2.2%
1861	5,635	−34.8%
1871	5,886	+4.5%
1881	5,712	−3.0%
1891	5,570	−2.5%
1901	5,412	−2.8%
1911	4,847	−10.4%
1926	4,883	+0.7%
1937	5,626	+15.2%
1951	6,322	+12.4%
1961	7,406	+17.1%
1966	7,153	−3.4%
1971	10,305	+44.1%
1981	10,429	+1.2%
1991	11,436	+9.7%
2001	13,560	+18.6%
2011	13,823	+1.9%
2021	14,086	+1.9%

The town's oldest building is Enniskillen Castle, built by Hugh (Maguire) the Hospitable who died in 1428. An earthwork, the Skonce on the shore of Lough Erne, may be the remains of an earlier motte. The castle was the stronghold of the junior branch of the Maguires. The first watergate was built around 1580 by Cú Chonnacht Maguire, though subsequent lowering of the level of the lough has left it without water. The strategic position of the castle made its capture important for the English in 1593, to support their plans for the control of Ulster. The castle was besieged three times in 1594–95. The English, led by a Captain Dowdall, captured it in February 1594. Maguire then laid siege to it, and defeated a relieving force at the Battle of the Ford of the Biscuits at Drumane Bridge on the Arney River. Although the defenders were relieved, Maguire gained possession of the castle from 1595 to 1598 and it was not finally captured by the English until 1607.

This was part of a wider campaign to bring the province of Ulster under English control; the final capture of Enniskillen Castle in 1607 was followed by the Plantation of Ulster, during which the lands of the native Irish were seized and handed over to planters loyal to the English Crown. The Maguires were supplanted by William Cole, originally from Devon, who was appointed by James I to build an English settlement there in 1612.

Captain Cole was installed as Constable and strengthened the castle wall and built a "fair house" on the old foundation as the centre point of the county town. The first Protestant parish church was erected on the hilltop in 1627. By 1630 the town had around 180 inhabitants, mostly comprising English and Scottish settlers. The Royal Free School of Fermanagh was moved onto the island in 1643. The first bridges were drawbridges; permanent bridges were not installed before 1688.

By 1689 the town had grown significantly. During the conflict which resulted from the ousting of James II by his Protestant rival, William III, Enniskillen and Derry were the focus of Williamite resistance in Ireland, including the nearby Battle of Newtownbutler.

Enniskillen and Derry were the two garrisons in Ulster that were not wholly loyal to James II, and it was the last town to fall before the Siege of Derry. As a direct result of this conflict, Enniskillen developed not only as a market town but also as a garrison, which became home to two regiments.

The former site of Fermanagh College at Gaol Square (the college has now moved to the old Erne Hospital site) was the former Enniskillen Gaol. Many people were tried and hanged in the square during the times of public execution. Part of the old gaol is still standing. Enniskillen Town Hall was designed by William Scott and completed in 1901.

=== Military history ===
Enniskillen is the site of the foundation of two British Army regiments:

- Royal Inniskilling Fusiliers
- The Inniskillings (6th Dragoons)

The town's name (with the archaic spelling) continues to form part of the title to The Royal Irish Regiment (27th (Inniskilling) 83rd and 87th and Ulster Defence Regiment). Enniskillen Castle features on the cap badge of both regiments.

=== The Troubles ===
Enniskillen was the site of several events during The Troubles, the most notable being the Remembrance Day bombing in November 1987 in which 11 people were killed. Bill Clinton opened The Clinton Centre in 2002 on the site of the bombing. The Provisional Irish Republican Army claimed responsibility for the attack.

== Demography ==
National Identity of Enniskillen residents (2021)
Nationality	Per cent
Irish	37.4%
Northern Irish	29.6%
British	28.4%

=== 2021 Census ===
On Census day 2021 there were 14,086 people living in Enniskillen. Of these:

- 61.52% (8,666) belong to or were brought up in the Catholic Christian faith and 29.09% (4,097) belong to or were brought up in various 'Protestant and Other Christian (including Christian related)' denominations. 2.2% (310) belong to other religions and 7.19% (1,013) had no religious background.
- 22.8% (3,212) indicated that they had a British only identity, 34.68% (4,885) had an Irish only identity and 26.4% (3,179) had a Northern Irish only identity (respondents could indicate more than one national identity)

=== 2011 Census ===
On Census day (27 March 2011) there were 13,823 people living in Enniskillen (5,733 households), accounting for 0.76% of the NI total and representing an increase of 1.6% on the Census 2001 population of 13,599. Of these:

- 19.76% were aged under 16 years and 15.59% were aged 65 and over;
- 51.80% of the usually resident population were female and 48.20% were male;
- 61.62% belong to or were brought up in the Catholic Christian faith and 33.55% belong to or were brought up in various 'Protestant and Other Christian (including Christian related)' denominations
- 35.59% indicated that they had a British national identity, 33.77% had an Irish national identity and 30.35% had a Northern Irish national identity (respondents could indicate more than one national identity)
- 39 years was the average (median) age of the population
- 13.03% had some knowledge of Irish (Gaelic) and 3.65% had some knowledge of Ulster-Scots

== Places of interest ==
=== Churches ===
There are four churches in the town centre. These are:

- St. Macartin's Cathedral (Church of Ireland) – This church dates from 1840. It was built on the site of an earlier Plantation church.
- St. Michael's Church (Catholic) – This church dates from 1875 although an earlier church on the site dates from 1803.
- Enniskillen Methodist Church – This church opened in 1867. It has a Palladian facade.
- Enniskillen Presbyterian Church – The current church was erected in 1897 although there is evidence of a building dating back to 1700.

There are several other churches outside the town centre.

=== Historic Buildings ===
Some of these buildings are outside the town.

- Castle Coole
- Colebrooke House, Brookeborough – eleven miles east of Enniskillen; built 1820
- Cole's Monument
- Enniskillen Castle
- Enniskillen Town Hall
- Enniskillen Courthouse – built 1785
- Florence Court – eight miles outside Enniskillen; 18th century
- Monea Castle
- Portora Castle
- The Regimental Museum of the Inniskilling Regiment

=== Natural Phenomena ===
- The Marble Arch Caves
- Cuilcagh Mountain Global Geo-Park
- Lough Navar and the Cliffs of Magho

=== Other ===
- Ardhowen Theatre
- The Clinton Centre
- The Round O
- William Blake's pub – historic public house

== Gallery ==
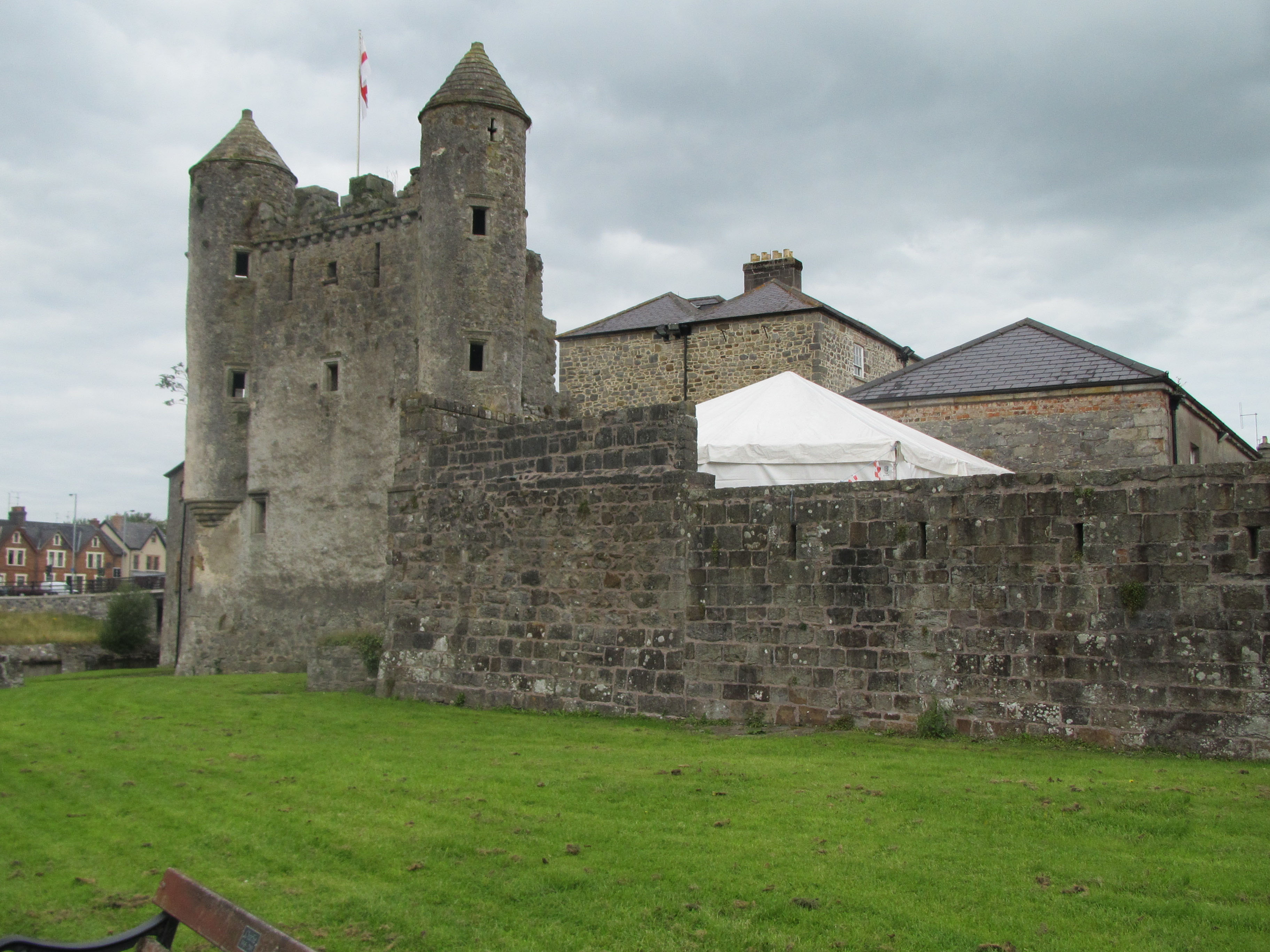
Enniskillen Castle

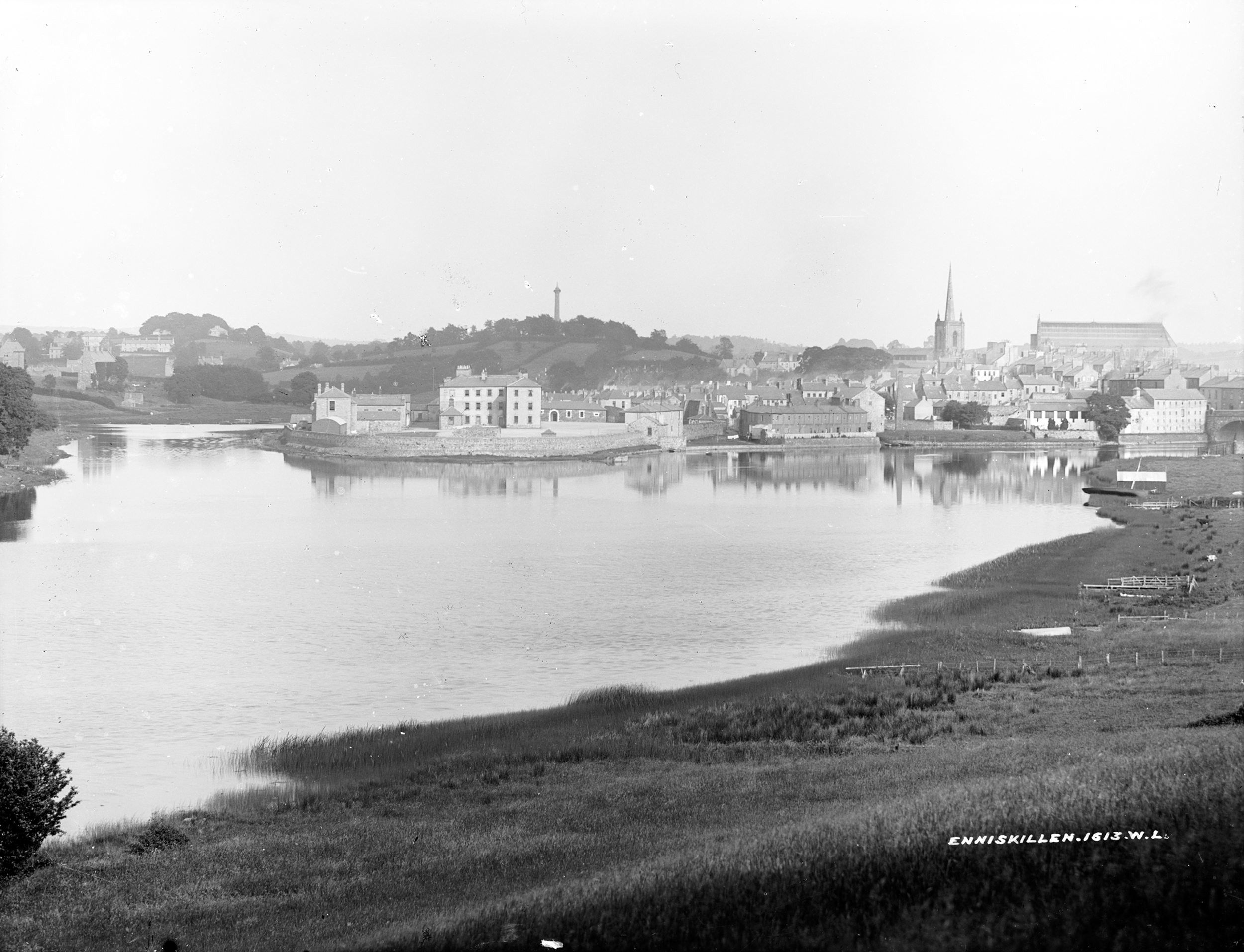
Enniskillen in the late 19th century

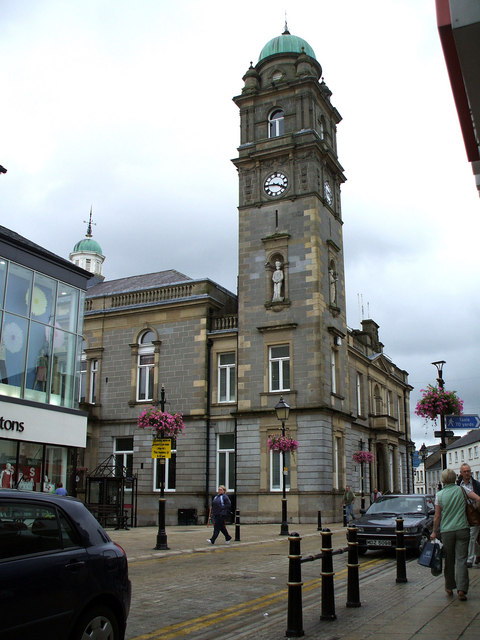
Enniskillen Town Hall

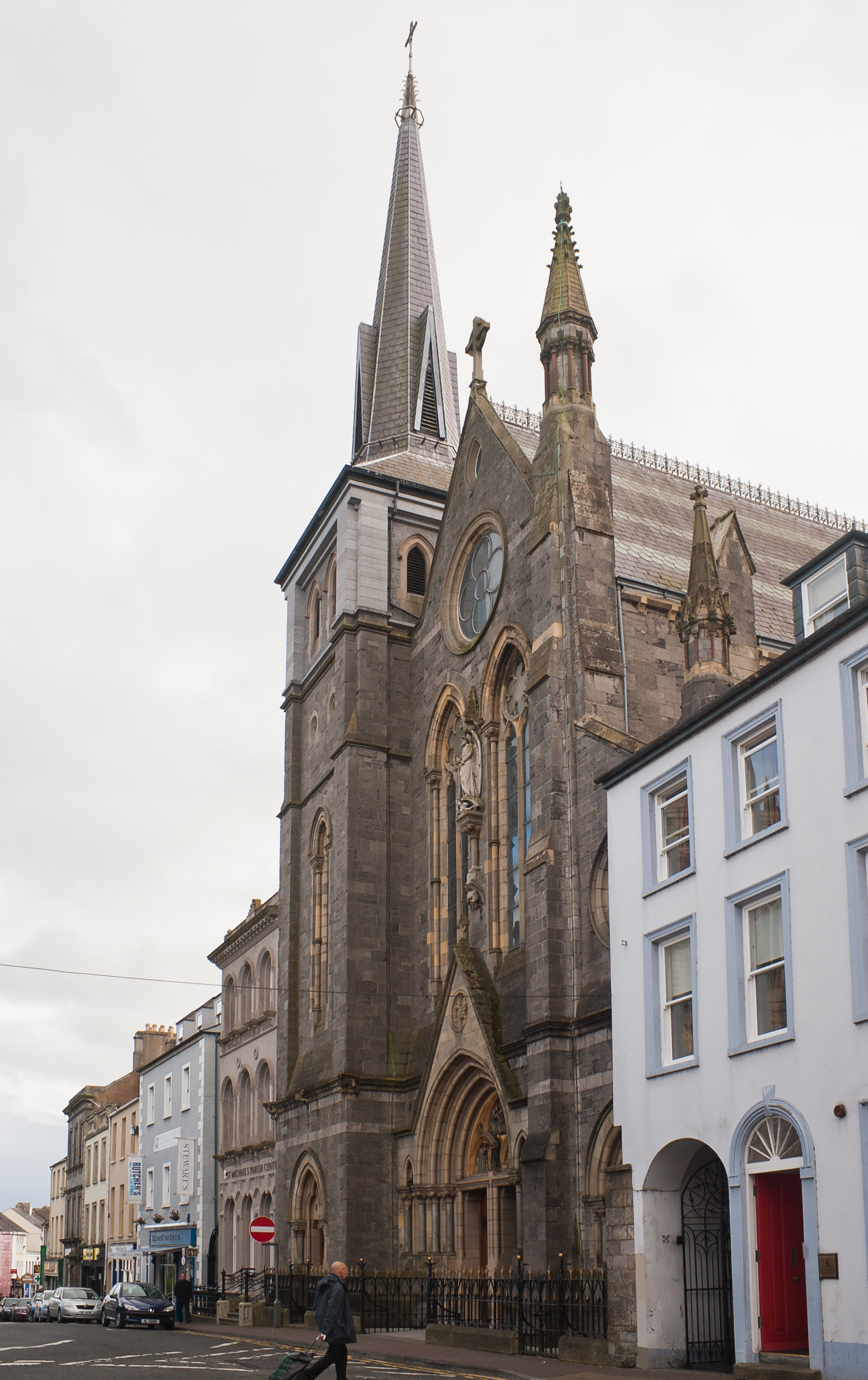
St. Michael's Church, Enniskillen

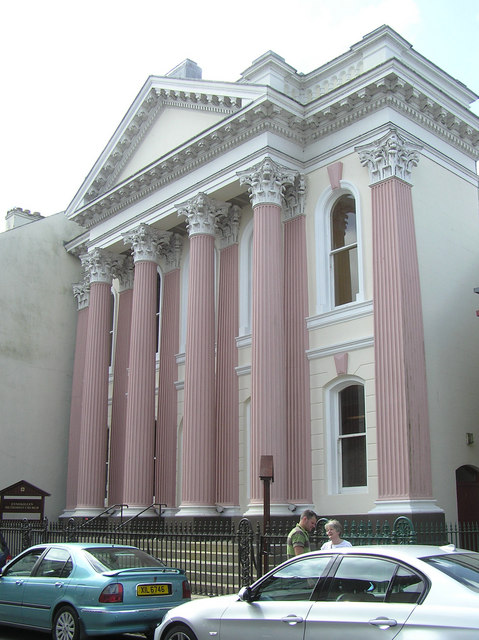
Methodist Church, Enniskillen

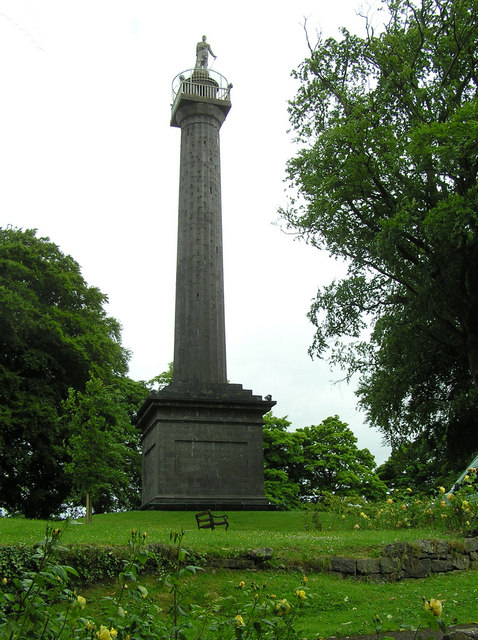
Cole's Monument, Enniskillen

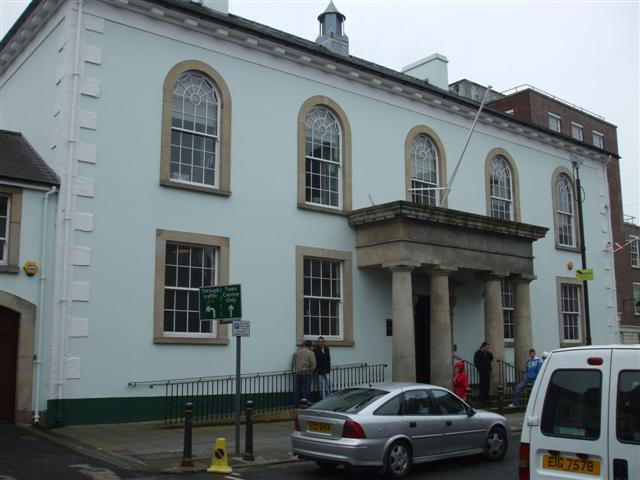
Enniskillen Courthouse

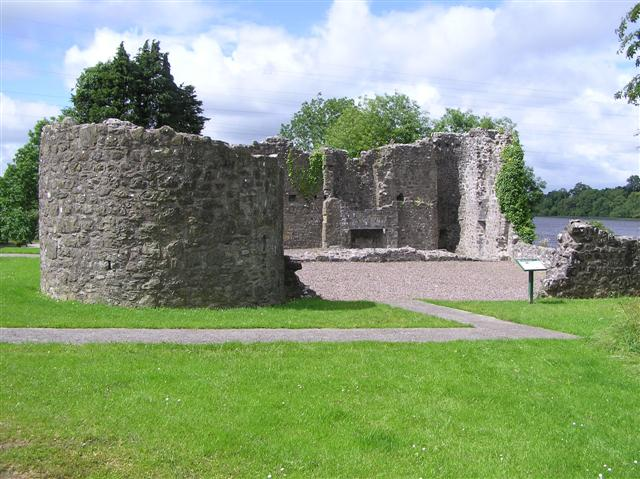
Portora Castle

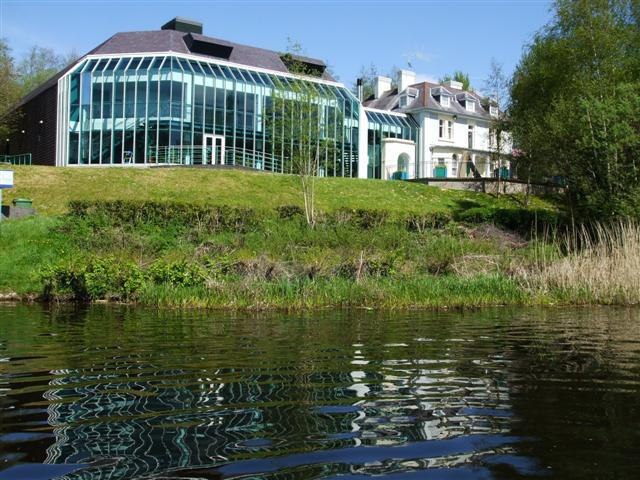
Ardhowen Theatre, Enniskillen

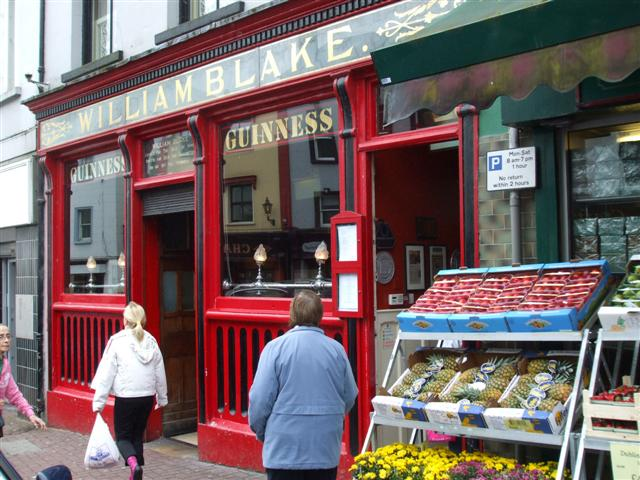
William Blake Pub, Enniskillen

== Sports ==
=== Association football ===
As of season 2023/24, the town has five association football teams, Enniskillen Rangers, Enniskillen Town United F.C., Enniskillen Athletic, Enniskillen Galaxy and Enniskillen Rovers. Founded in 1953, Enniskillen Rangers are the oldest and most successful of these, having won the Irish Junior Cup five times, most recently in season 2023/24, when they defeated Cleary Celtic FC 2–0 in Stangmore Park, Dungannon, the Fermanagh & Western Division One title 19 times and the Mulhern Cup 16 times. They play their home games at The Ball Range.

Enniskillen Rangers have several notable former players including Sandy Fulton and Jim Cleary.

Enniskillen Town United F.C. currently play in the Fermanagh & Western 1st Division. Their most notable former player is Michael McGovern who won 32 senior caps for Northern Ireland and as of January 2024 was on loan at Livingston F.C. from parent club Heart of Midlothian F.C. Enniskillen Town United F.C. currently play their home games at St Michael's GS Pavilion in Enniskillen.

=== Rugby ===
Enniskillen Rugby Football Club was founded in 1925 and plays its home games at Mullaghmeen. The club currently fields 4 senior men's teams, a senior ladies' team, a range of male and female youth teams, a vibrant mini section and a disability tag team called The Enniskillen Elks. Enniskillen XV won the Ulster Towns Cup in the 2018/19 season, defeating Ballyclare 19–0. The team currently play in Kukri Ulster Rugby Championship Division 1.

The rugby club was formed on 28 August 1925, when 37 attended a meeting in Enniskillen Town Hall. The name Enniskillen Rugby Club was agreed and the club adopted the rules of the Dublin University Football Club. The first match was played on 30 September 1925 against Ballyshannon in County Donegal.

=== Gaelic games ===
Enniskillen Gaels is a Gaelic Athletic Association club founded in 1927. It is based at Brewster Park, Enniskillen. The club has had success in both Gaelic football and hurling winning in both county and provincial competitions.

== International events ==
Enniskillen was the venue of the 39th G8 summit which was held on 17 and 18 June 2013. It was held at the Lough Erne Resort, a five-star hotel and golf resort on the shore of Lough Erne. The gathering was the biggest international diplomatic gathering ever held in Northern Ireland. Among the G8 leaders who attended were British Prime Minister David Cameron, United States President Barack Obama, German Chancellor Angela Merkel, and Russian President Vladimir Putin.

In the past, Enniskillen has hosted an array of international events, most notably stages of the World Waterski World Cup, annually from 2005 to 2007 at the Broadmeadow. Despite its success, Enniskillen was not chosen as a World Cup Stop for 2008.

In January 2009, Enniskillen hosted the ceremonial start of Rally Ireland 2009, the first stage of the WRC FIA World Rally Championship 2009 Calendar.

Enniskillen has hosted the Happy Days arts festival since 2012, which celebrates "the work and influence of Nobel Prize-winning writer Samuel Beckett" and is the "first annual, international, multi-arts festival to be held in Northern Ireland since the launch of the Ulster Bank Belfast Festival at Queen's in 1962".

== Notable natives and residents ==
=== Arts and Media ===
- Samuel Beckett, playwright, educated at Portora Royal School
- Nathan Carter, singer
- Charles Duff, Irish author of books on language learning and other subjects
- Adrian Dunbar, actor, born and brought up in Enniskillen
- Nial Fulton, film and television producer, educated at Portora Royal School
- Neil Hannon, lead singer/composer of the pop band The Divine Comedy, educated at Portora Royal School
- Charles Lawson, most notable for playing Jim McDonald in Coronation Street
- Lisa McHugh, country music singer; born in Glasgow, Scotland, she moved to Enniskillen as an adult.
- Fearghal McKinney, journalist, former UTV broadcaster and member of the Northern Ireland Assembly
- Nigel McLoughlin, poet, editor of Iota poetry journal and Professor of Creativity and Poetics, University of Gloucestershire
- Ciarán McMenamin, television actor and author
- Frank Ormsby, poet
- David Robinson, photographer and publisher, educated at Portora Royal School
- William Scott, artist
- Mick Softley singer and songwriter for Bob Dylan and Donovan, lived in the town at the time of his death
- Joan Trimble, pianist and composer
- Oscar Wilde, satirist and playwright, educated at Portora Royal School
- Ron Wilson, a news anchor with Network Ten in Australia

=== Business ===
- James Gamble, co-founder of Procter & Gamble, educated at Portora Royal School

=== Medicine and Science ===
- Denis Burkitt, FRS, surgeon and epidemiologist

=== Military ===
- Eric Bell, recipient of the Victoria Cross
- Henry Hartigan, recipient of the Victoria Cross
- James McGuire, recipient of the Victoria Cross
- George Nurse, recipient of the Victoria Cross

=== Politics ===
- Gerald Grosvenor, 6th Duke of Westminster, brought up at the family's estate at Ely Lodge
- Gordon Wilson, Irish senator and peace campaigner, who lived on Cooper Crescent

=== Religion ===
- Edward Cooney, evangelist and early leader of the Cooneyite and Go-Preacher sects, educated at Portora Royal School
- Edward Kernan, a Roman Catholic bishop
- Henry Francis Lyte, hymn composer, most notably of "Abide with Me", educated at Portora Royal School
- John McElroy (1782–1877), Jesuit priest, founder of Boston College

=== Sports ===
- Robert Baloucoune, rugby union player, was born and grew up in Enniskillen, learned his rugby at Portora Royal School and made his international debut for Ireland in July 2021
- Declan Burns, Irish kayaking athlete, three-time Irish Olympic representative and former World Superstars runner-up
- Roy Carroll, goalkeeper who played for a number of professional clubs, most notably Manchester United F. C. and who was capped 45 times by Northern Ireland
- Timothy Cathcart, rally driver
- Harry Chatton, football player, from the 1920s and 1930s, who was a dual international for both the IFA and FAI Irish international teams
- Jim Cleary, former Glentoran footballer and member of Northern Ireland's 1982 World Cup squad
- William Emerson, football player who won 11 caps for Ireland between 1919 and 1923
- Gordon Ferris, Northern Irish former heavyweight boxer who was both Irish and British champion in the early 1980s
- Casey Howe, international footballer for the Northern Ireland Women's team
- Frank Hoy, professional wrestler, was born in the town
- Ted Keenan, record-breaking long-distance swimmer, inducted in 1984 into the Fort Lauderdale International Swimming Hall of Fame
- Robert Kerr, Olympic 100m gold medalist in the 1908 Olympics for Canada
- Kyle Lafferty, striker, professional football player for a number of clubs, most notably Rangers F. C., with 89 Northern Ireland international caps
- Andrew Little, former professional football player and Northern Ireland international, educated at Portora Royal School
- J. J. McCoy (rugby union), from nearby Monea, Jimmy first played rugby for Portora Royal School, Enniskillen
- Michael McGovern, former Northern Ireland international goalkeeper.
- Kieran McKenna, football manager, appointed to take charge of Ipswich Town FC in December 2021
- Harry Mercer, former player for Enniskillen Corinthians F.C. who, while with Linfield F.C., won a senior Ireland cap while still an amateur
- Holly Nixon, former member of Portora Boat Club and World Champion oarswoman
- Gavin Noble, Irish international triathlete, educated at Portora Royal School
- Dick Rowley, football player who won six caps for Ireland between 1929 and 1931

== Education ==
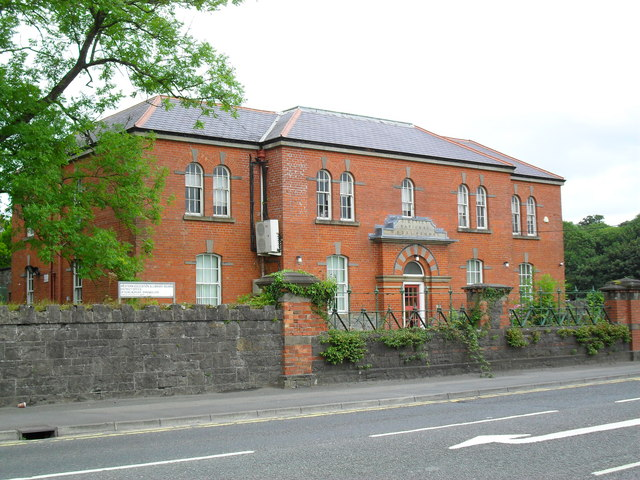
The old Enniskillen Model School, now used as the Fermanagh office of the Western Education and Library Board (WELB)

There are numerous schools and colleges in and around the Enniskillen area, from primary level to secondary level, including some further education colleges such as the technical college.

=== Primary level ===
- Enniskillen Integrated Primary School
- Model Primary School
- Holy Trinity Primary School
- Jones Memorial Primary School
- Mullnaskea Primary School

=== Secondary level ===
- Erne Integrated College
- Devenish College
- Enniskillen Royal Grammar School
- Mount Lourdes Enniskillen; convent girls' grammar school
- St Michael's College; boys' grammar school
- St Fanchea's College
- St Joseph's College

=== Colleges ===
- Enniskillen Campus of the College of Agriculture, Food and Rural Enterprise (CAFRE)
- Enniskillen Campus South West College

== Transport ==
=== Rail – historic ===
Railway lines from Enniskillen railway station linked the town with Derry (Londonderry and Enniskillen Railway) from 1854, Dundalk (Irish North Western Railway) from 1861, Bundoran (Enniskillen and Bundoran Railway) from 1868 and Sligo from 1882. By 1883 the Great Northern Railway (Ireland) absorbed all the lines except the Sligo, Leitrim and Northern Counties Railway (SLNCR), which remained independent throughout its existence. In October 1957 the Government of Northern Ireland closed the GNR lines, which made it impossible for the SLNCR to continue and forced it to also close.

=== Rail – current ===
Today the nearest railway station to Enniskillen is Sligo station which is served by multiple trains to Dublin Connolly and is operated by Iarnród Éireann. The Dublin-Sligo railway line has a two-hourly service run by Iarnród Éireann. A connecting bus from Sligo via Manorhamilton to Enniskillen is operated by Bus Éireann.

=== Bus ===
Bus service to Enniskillen is provided by both Ulsterbus and Bus Éireann, from Enniskillen bus station. Number 261, 261b and X261 Goldline buses run from Belfast to Enniskillen. Bus Éireann Route 30 runs from Donegal to Dublin Airport/Dublin City via Enniskillen.

=== Air ===
Enniskillen has a World War II-era airport, Enniskillen/St Angelo Airport. The airport had scheduled flights in the past but now serves mainly private traffic.

=== Road ===
The town is on the main A4/N16 route linking Belfast and Sligo, and on the main Dublin to Ballyshannon route, the N3/A46/A509.

== Twinning ==
Enniskillen was originally twinned with Brackwede – a Bielefeld suburb – where the Inniskilling Dragoon Guards were stationed in the late 1950s when the twinning was initiated; however, this suburb was incorporated into Stadt Bielefeld in 1973, the city with which Enniskillen is now officially twinned.

Though the twinning arrangements are still operational, at a meeting of the Regeneration and Community Committee, in February 2018, it was agreed that the twinning arrangements would be formally terminated at the end of the Council term in June 2018. However, Fermanagh and Omagh District Council still have plans to send representatives to Brackwede for the 60th-anniversary celebrations of the twinning. Therefore, the future of the twinning is now somewhat unclear.

== Climate ==
Enniskillen has a maritime climate with a narrow range of temperatures and rainfall. The nearest official Met Office weather station for which online records are available is at Lough Navar Forest, about 8 1/2 mi (14 km) northwest of Enniskillen. Data has also more recently been collected from Enniskillen/St Angelo Airport, under 4 mi (6 km) north of the town centre, which should in time give a more accurate representation of the climate of the Enniskillen area.

The absolute maximum temperature is 29.8 °C (85.6 °F), recorded during July 2006. In an 'average' year, the warmest day is 25.5 °C (77.9 °F) and only 2.4 days a year should rise to 25.1 °C (77.2 °F) or above. The respective absolute maximum for St Angelo is 29.4 °C (84.9 °F)

The absolute minimum temperature is −12.9 °C (8.8 °F), recorded during January 1984. In an 'average' year, the coldest night should fall to −8.2 °C (17.2 °F). Lough Navar is a frosty location, with some 76 air frosts recorded in a typical year. It is likely that Enniskillen town centre is significantly less frosty than this. The absolute minimum at St Angelo is −14.5 °C (5.9 °F), reported during the record cold month of December 2010.

The warmest month on record at St Angelo was August 1995 with a mean temperature of 18.8 °C (65.8 °F) (mean maximum 23.3 °C (73.9 °F), mean minimum 12.9 °C (55.2 °F)), while the coldest month was December 2010, with a mean temperature of −1.8 °C (28.8 °F) (mean maximum 2.9 °C (37.2 °F), mean minimum −5.9 °C (21.4 °F)).

Rainfall is high, averaging over 1500 mm. 212 days of the year report at least 1 mm of precipitation, ranging from 15 days during April, May and June, to 20 days in October, November, December, January and March.

The Köppen climate classification subtype for this climate is "Cfb" (Marine West Coast Climate/Oceanic climate).

Climate data for Lough Navar Forest: 126 m (413 ft) 1991–2020 normals, extremes 1960–2019
Month	Jan	Feb	Mar	Apr	May	Jun	Jul	Aug	Sep	Oct	Nov	Dec	Year
Record high °C (°F)	13.3 (55.9)	15.4 (59.7)	20.0 (68.0)	23.2 (73.8)	26.5 (79.7)	29.7 (85.5)	29.8 (85.6)	28.0 (82.4)	23.2 (73.8)	19.5 (67.1)	16.8 (62.2)	14.3 (57.7)	29.8 (85.6)
Mean daily maximum °C (°F)	6.8 (44.2)	7.5 (45.5)	9.6 (49.3)	12.3 (54.1)	15.3 (59.5)	17.4 (63.3)	18.6 (65.5)	18.3 (64.9)	16.1 (61.0)	12.5 (54.5)	9.2 (48.6)	7.1 (44.8)	12.6 (54.6)
Daily mean °C (°F)	3.7 (38.7)	4.1 (39.4)	5.4 (41.7)	7.4 (45.3)	10.2 (50.4)	12.5 (54.5)	14.2 (57.6)	13.9 (57.0)	11.7 (53.1)	8.7 (47.7)	5.9 (42.6)	3.9 (39.0)	8.5 (47.3)
Mean daily minimum °C (°F)	0.6 (33.1)	0.6 (33.1)	1.3 (34.3)	2.5 (36.5)	5.0 (41.0)	7.8 (46.0)	9.7 (49.5)	9.4 (48.9)	7.3 (45.1)	4.9 (40.8)	2.6 (36.7)	0.8 (33.4)	4.4 (39.9)
Record low °C (°F)	−12.9 (8.8)	−10.5 (13.1)	−11.6 (11.1)	−7.3 (18.9)	−4.4 (24.1)	−2.4 (27.7)	1.0 (33.8)	0.2 (32.4)	−2.6 (27.3)	−7.2 (19.0)	−8.4 (16.9)	−14.5 (5.9)	−14.5 (5.9)
Average precipitation mm (inches)	172.0 (6.77)	131.6 (5.18)	121.6 (4.79)	108.9 (4.29)	103.5 (4.07)	96.8 (3.81)	115.0 (4.53)	122.9 (4.84)	116.5 (4.59)	153.7 (6.05)	172.6 (6.80)	180.9 (7.12)	1,596.3 (62.85)
Average precipitation days	19.8	17.8	17.8	16.5	15.8	14.9	17.7	18.0	16.9	18.0	20.4	19.8	213.4
Source 1: Météo Climat
Source 2: KNMI (extremes)

Climate data for Lough Navar Forest 126m asl 1961–1990, extremes 1960– (weather station 8.5 miles (14 km) north-west of Enniskillen)
Month	Jan	Feb	Mar	Apr	May	Jun	Jul	Aug	Sep	Oct	Nov	Dec	Year
Record high °C (°F)	13.0 (55.4)	15.4 (59.7)	20.0 (68.0)	23.2 (73.8)	26.1 (79.0)	28.8 (83.8)	29.8 (85.6)	28.0 (82.4)	23.2 (73.8)	19.5 (67.1)	16.8 (62.2)	13.8 (56.8)	29.8 (85.6)
Mean daily maximum °C (°F)	6.4 (43.5)	7.0 (44.6)	8.9 (48.0)	11.5 (52.7)	14.5 (58.1)	16.6 (61.9)	18.3 (64.9)	18.1 (64.6)	15.6 (60.1)	12.2 (54.0)	8.8 (47.8)	7.0 (44.6)	12.1 (53.7)
Mean daily minimum °C (°F)	0.3 (32.5)	0.5 (32.9)	1.4 (34.5)	2.2 (36.0)	4.3 (39.7)	7.4 (45.3)	9.7 (49.5)	9.2 (48.6)	7.1 (44.8)	5.1 (41.2)	2.1 (35.8)	1.2 (34.2)	4.2 (39.6)
Record low °C (°F)	−12.9 (8.8)	−10.5 (13.1)	−11.6 (11.1)	−7.3 (18.9)	−4.4 (24.1)	−2.4 (27.7)	1.0 (33.8)	0.2 (32.4)	−2.6 (27.3)	−7.2 (19.0)	−8.4 (16.9)	−12.8 (9.0)	−12.9 (8.8)
Average precipitation mm (inches)	163.38 (6.43)	123.19 (4.85)	136.81 (5.39)	93.85 (3.69)	87.4 (3.44)	93.39 (3.68)	101.37 (3.99)	117.45 (4.62)	123.94 (4.88)	155.7 (6.13)	157.26 (6.19)	169.1 (6.66)	1,522.84 (59.95)
Average precipitation days	20	16	19	14	14	15	16	16	17	19	19	20	205
Source 1: Norwegian Meteorological Institute
Source 2: Royal Netherlands Meteorological Institute

== See also ==
- List of civil parishes of County Fermanagh
- List of localities in Northern Ireland by population
