= List of Northern Ireland football transfers winter 2024–25 =

This is a list of Northern Irish football transfers for the 2024–25 winter transfer window. Only transfers featuring NIFL Premiership are listed.

== NIFL Premiership ==
Note: Flags indicate national team as has been defined under FIFA eligibility rules. Players may hold more than one non-FIFA nationality.

=== Larne ===
In:

No.	Pos.	Nation	Player
10	FW	NIR	Tiarnan O'Connor (from H&W Welders)
22	FW	SKN	Harry Panayiotou (free agent)
28	MF	ENG	Olatunde Bayode (from (Gibraltar) Bruno's Magpies)
—	MF	NIR	Joshua Kee (from H&W Welders)

Out:

No.	Pos.	Nation	Player
6	MF	SCO	Joe Thomson (to Glentoran)
14	FW	NIR	Benji Magee (on loan from Loughgall)
15	MF	ENG	George Marsh (free agent)
17	DF	ENG	Josh Seary (loan return to (England) Preston North End)
20	DF	IRL	Sam Todd (loan return to (Republic of Ireland) Derry City)
36	GK	NIR	Dylan Graham (on loan to Ballyclare Comrades)
—	MF	NIR	Joshua Kee (on loan to H&W Welders)
—	MF	NIR	Caolan Donnelly (on loan to Ballinamallard United, previously on loan at Ballyclare Comrades)
—	FW	NIR	Jack Hastings (on loan to Carrick Rangers, previously on loan at Annagh United)
—	DF	ENG	Baris Altintop (to Portadown, previously on loan)
—	MF	NIR	Ethan Simpson (to Ards, previously on loan)

=== Linfield ===
In:

No.	Pos.	Nation	Player
6	MF	ESP	Alex Rodríguez (free agent)
25	FW	SCO	Kieran Offord (from (Scotland) St. Mirren, previously on loan at Crusaders)
38	MF	SCO	Callumn Morrison (from (Scotland) Falkirk)

Out:

No.	Pos.	Nation	Player

=== Cliftonville ===
In:

No.	Pos.	Nation	Player
25	DF	IRL	Jack Keaney (from (Republic of Ireland) Drogheda United)
26	MF	NIR	Harry Wilson (free agent)
32	FW	USA	Eric McWoods (free agent)
34	FW	AUS	Alex Parsons (from (Australia) Brisbane Roar)
—	MF	IRL	Callum McCay (from Derry City)

Out:

No.	Pos.	Nation	Player
17	MF	IRL	Ronan Doherty (to Coleraine)
27	FW	SCO	Taylor Steven (loan return to (Scotland) St. Johnstone)
29	FW	NIR	Jack Berry (to (Lithuania) Be1)
36	FW	NIR	Keevan Hawthorne (on loan to Ballyclare Comrades)
41	MF	IRL	Joe Sheridan (on loan to Queen's University Belfast)
—	MF	IRL	Callum McCay (on loan to Institute)

=== Crusaders ===
In:

No.	Pos.	Nation	Player
22	FW	SCO	Josh O'Connor (from (Scotland) Hibernian, previously on loan at (Republic of Ireland) Dundalk)
24	MF	SCO	Alex King (from (Scotland) Greenock Morton)
40	GK	NIR	Rian Brown (from Newington)

Out:

No.	Pos.	Nation	Player
11	FW	NIR	James Teelan (free agent)
17	FW	SCO	Kieran Offord (loan return to (Scotland) St. Mirren)
23	MF	IRL	Billy Vance (on loan to Ballyclare Comrades)
41	GK	NIR	Ryan Kerr (on loan to Dundela)

=== Glentoran ===
In:

No.	Pos.	Nation	Player
12	MF	SCO	Joe Thomson (from Larne)
15	DF	IRL	Ciarán Coll (from Derry City)
16	DF	IRL	Shane McEleney (from Derry City)
26	MF	ENG	Christie Pattisson (from (Republic of Ireland) Waterford)
32	FW	NIR	Nathaniel Ferris (from Loughgall)

Out:

No.	Pos.	Nation	Player
9	FW	NIR	Jay Donnelly (on loan to Newington)
14	FW	BER	Djair Parfitt-Williams (free agent)
18	DF	NIR	Harry Murphy (on loan to Glenavon)
23	DF	NIR	Tony McIlhone (on loan to Newington)
24	DF	NIR	Owen O’Neill (on loan to Lisburn Distillery)
42	DF	NIR	Callan Farley (on loan to Warrenpoint Town)
46	DF	NIR	Theo McToal (on loan to Ballyclare Comrades)
47	FW	NIR	Casey Smyth (on loan to Newry City)
—	GK	NIR	Lorcan Donnelly (on loan to Newry City, previously on loan at Lisburn Distillery)

=== Coleraine ===
In:

No.	Pos.	Nation	Player
12	DF	NIR	Patrick Burns (free agent)
27	MF	IRL	Ronan Doherty (from Cliftonville)
28	DF	IRL	Charles Dunne (from (Scotland) St. Mirren)
29	FW	SCO	Declan McManus (from (Wales) The New Saints)

Out:

No.	Pos.	Nation	Player
14	MF	SCO	MacKenzie Carse (to (Scotland) Stirling Albion)
16	MF	NIR	Ciaron Harkin (loan return to Derry City)
18	FW	NIR	Kirk McLaughlin (to Loughgall)
22	FW	NIR	Sam McClintock (on loan to Limavady United)

=== Carrick Rangers ===
In:

No.	Pos.	Nation	Player
29	DF	IRL	Reece Web (from (Republic of Ireland) Wexford)
30	MF	IRL	Ethan Boyle (from (Republic of Ireland) Wexford)
31	DF	IRL	Luke O'Brien (from (Republic of Ireland) St Patrick's Athletic, previously on loan at (Republic of Ireland) Finn Harps)
33	MF	IRL	Shane Forbes (from (Republic of Ireland) Athlone Town)
34	FW	NIR	Jack Hastings (on loan from Larne, previously on loan at Annagh United)
35	MF	IRL	Jack O'Reilly (from (Sweden) Ytterhogdal)
36	MF	IRL	Adam Foley (from (Republic of Ireland) Drogheda United)
38	DF	IRL	Cian O'Malley (from (Republic of Ireland) Wexford)
41	GK	ENG	Jack McIntyre (from (Scotland) Ayr United)

Out:

No.	Pos.	Nation	Player
9	FW	NIR	Emmett McGuckin (to Limavady United)
14	MF	NIR	Ronan Kalla (to Newington)
25	GK	NIR	Ben McCauley (to Coagh United)
36	MF	IRL	Adam Foley (retired)
—	MF	NIR	Jaydyn Withers (to Ballyclare Comrades, previously on loan at Dundela)

=== Dungannon Swifts ===
In:

No.	Pos.	Nation	Player
27	FW	IRL	Brandon Bermingham (from (United States) Rhode Island Rams)

Out:

No.	Pos.	Nation	Player
15	DF	NIR	Tommy Taggert (on loan to Newry City)
16	GK	NIR	Patrick Grogan (on loan to Bangor)
39	MF	NIR	Aidan Hegarty (on loan to Institute)
—	FW	TLS	Kenny Ximenes (on loan to Dollingstown, previously on loan at Annagh United)

=== Loughgall ===
In:

No.	Pos.	Nation	Player
17	MF	IRL	Matthew O'Brien (from (Republic of Ireland) Drogheda United)
20	FW	IRL	Robbie Mahon (from (Republic of Ireland) Dundalk)
21	FW	NIR	Benji Magee (on loan from Larne)
25	DF	IRL	James Carroll (from Glenavon)
30	MF	NIR	Francis McCaffrey (from Newry City)
32	FW	NIR	Kirk McLaughlin (from Coleraine)

Out:

No.	Pos.	Nation	Player
2	DF	NIR	Conor McDermott (to St James Swifts)
9	FW	NIR	Nathaniel Ferris (to Glentoran)
10	MF	NIR	Andrew Hoey (on loan to Annagh United)
11	MF	NIR	Caolan McAleer (to Dunbreen Rovers)
14	DF	NIR	Conor Kerr (to (Australia) Rydalmere Lions)
22	FW	NIR	Jay Boyd (loan return to Crusaders)
26	DF	NIR	Ben Harvey (on loan to Newry City)

=== Glenavon ===
In:

No.	Pos.	Nation	Player
12	GK	IRL	Tadhg Ryan (from Derry City)
20	DF	NIR	Harry Murphy (on loan from Glentoran)
27	MF	NIR	Sean Carlin (from Institute)
28	MF	IRL	Aaron Heaney (on loan from Derry City)

Out:

No.	Pos.	Nation	Player
14	MF	IRL	James Doona (on loan to Armagh City)
19	DF	IRL	James Carroll (to Loughgall)
23	MF	IRL	Keith Ward (to (Republic of Ireland) Dundalk)
24	MF	NIR	Jamie Doran (on loan to Newry City)
—	DF	NIR	Bobby Deane (to Limavady United, previously on loan at Ards)
—	FW	NIR	Cohen Henderson (to Oxford Sunnyside, previously on loan at Banbridge Town)

=== Ballymena United ===
In:

No.	Pos.	Nation	Player
22	FW	IRL	Success Edogun (from (Republic of Ireland) Finn Harps)
28	MF	IRL	Patrick McEleney (from Derry City)
31	MF	IRL	Kian Corbally (from (Republic of Ireland) Wexford)
32	DF	IRL	Shane Flynn (from (Republic of Ireland) Waterford)
39	DF	NIR	Conor Barr (on loan from Derry City)
55	DF	ENG	Duncan Idehen (on loan from Derry City)

Out:

No.	Pos.	Nation	Player
6	DF	NIR	Colin Coates (retired)
10	FW	IRL	Mikey Place (to (Republic of Ireland) Finn Harps)
14	MF	SCO	John Herron (free agent)
16	MF	NIR	Brendan Barr (to Institute)
20	MF	NIR	Jack O'Mahony (to Bangor)
24	DF	NIR	Sean Brown (loan return to Larne)
33	FW	NIR	Noah Stewart (to (England) Maidenhead United)
34	MF	NIR	Oisin Devlin (loan return to Larne)
—	DF	NIR	Caleb Crawford (on loan to Moyola Park, previously on loan at Dundela)
—	DF	NIR	Shea McAuley (on loan to Tobermore United, previously on loan at Moyola Park)

=== Portadown ===
In:

No.	Pos.	Nation	Player
2	DF	ENG	Baris Altintop (from Larne, previously on loan)
21	MF	IRL	Rabby Tabu Minzamba (from (Republic of Ireland) Montpelier)
28	GK	NIR	Jordan Williamson (from Shankill United)
34	DF	IRL	Divin Isamala (on loan from (Republic of Ireland) Bohemians, previously on loan at (Republic of Ireland) Wexford)

Out:

No.	Pos.	Nation	Player
14	MF	NIR	Jack Henderson (to Annagh United)
22	DF	NIR	Jay Reilly (on loan to Ballyclare Comrades)
23	MF	IRL	Liam Mulllan (loan return to Derry City)
27	FW	NIR	Cathair Friel (free agent)
30	FW	NIR	Jamie McDonagh (on loan to Bangor)
31	MF	NIR	Zach Cowan (on loan to Banbridge Town)
33	GK	NIR	Jamie Ray (to Enniskillen Town United)
—	DF	SCO	Jack Duncan (to Broxburn Athletic, previously on loan at Dundela)

== See also ==
- 2024–25 NIFL Premiership
