= 2005–06 New Zealand Knights FC season =

New Zealand Knights
2005-06 season
- Chairman: Brian Katzen
- Manager: John Adshead
- A-League: 8th
- Pre-Season Cup: Group stage
- Top goalscorer: League: Jeremy Brockie (4); Simon Yeo (4); All: Jeremy Brockie (4); Simon Yeo (4)
- Highest home attendance: 9,827 v Sydney FC; 2 September 2005
- Lowest home attendance: 1,922 v Melbourne Victory; 26 November 2005
- Average home league attendance: 3,909
Home colours	Away colours

The 2005–06 New Zealand Knights FC season was the club's inaugural season in the Australian A-League. Picking up just one win and three draws out of the 21 regular season matches, the Knights finished at the bottom of the table, 20 points behind 7th placed Melbourne Victory.

== Season overview ==
In their debut season, the Knights scored only 15 goals in their 21 fixtures. Their joint leading scorers were Englishman Simon Yeo and teenage whizkid Jeremy Brockie, with four apiece. Sean Devine scored three goals, while Joshua Rose, Jeremy Christie, Neil Emblen and Xiaobin Zhang all managed to find the back of the net once. Former Walsall right-back Darren Bazeley was the only Knight to start in all 21 of their games.

The club was plunged into turmoil in late 2005, as club captain Danny Hay apparently fell out with Knights bosses and coach John Adshead, and was released just before Christmas. This followed the departures of UK signings Ronnie Bull and former Lincoln City striker Simon Yeo.

The Knights may have had poor crowds in their inaugural A-League season but they did have loyal support from their supporters group, Bloc-5. Supporters who formerly supported the now-defunct Football Kingz franchise, are known for dressing up in the team's colours, chanting loudly and attending all home fixtures.

Immediately after the season, the Knights fired assistant coach Tommy Mason. Former Fulham reserve team and academy head coach Paul Nevin was named head coach to assist current manager John Adshead as Mason's replacement.

One outcome of the Knights' debut season was 17-year-old New Zealander Jeremy Brockie. The midfielder-cum-striker was originally selected as one of the Knights three under-20 players in their squad. By the end of the season though, he had become a regular starter, scoring a double at home against the Newcastle Jets. This was followed up by a strike to earn a draw with Sydney FC, and a goal in the Knights' final game of the season, versus Melbourne Victory.

== Transfers ==
=== In ===
Date	Pos.	Name	From
7 March 2005	DF	(Netherlands) Frank van Eijs	(Vietnam) Hà Nội F.C.
14 April 2005	DF	(Australia) John Tambouras	Free agent
14 April 2005	GK	(Australia) Danny Milosevic	(Scotland) Celtic
14 April 2005	FW	(Republic of Ireland) Sean Devine	(England) Exeter City
14 April 2005	MF	(England) Neil Emblen	(England) Walsall
14 April 2005	MF	(Australia) Steve Fitzsimmons	Free agent
14 April 2005	FW	(Japan) Naoki Imaya	(Australia) Blacktown City Demons
14 April 2005	MF	(Australia) Josh Maguire	(Australia) Blacktown City Demons
14 April 2005	GK	(New Zealand) Glen Moss	(Australia) Bonnyrigg White Eagles
5 May 2005	MF	(Australia) Zenon Caravella	(Australia) Sydney Olympic
27 May 2005	FW	(New Zealand) Jeremy Brockie	(New Zealand) Canterbury United
27 May 2005	DF	(New Zealand) Cole Tinkler	Free agent
1 June 2005	MF	(England) Ben Collett	(England) Manchester United
1 June 2005	FW	(England) Simon Yeo	(England) Lincoln City
1 June 2005	FW	(China) Xiaobin Zhang	Free agent
21 June 2005	FW	(New Zealand) Kris Bright	(New Zealand) Waitakere City
21 June 2005	DF	(England) Ronnie Bull	(England) Grimsby Town
21 June 2005	MF	(New Zealand) Jeremy Christie	Free agent
21 June 2005	MF	(New Zealand) Sam Jasper	(New Zealand) North Shore United
21 June 2005	DF	(Australia) Joshua Rose	Free agent

=== Mid-Season Losses ===
Date	Pos.	Name	To
6 November 2005	DF	(England) Ronnie Bull	(England) Basingstoke Town
17 December 2005	FW	(England) Simon Yeo	(England) Lincoln City
23 December 2005	DF	(New Zealand) Danny Hay	(Australia) Perth Glory
25 January 2006	MF	(Australia) Steve Fitzsimmons	Released

== Squad statistics ==
No.	Pos	Nat	Player	Total		A-League		Pre-Season Cup	
No.	Pos	Nat	Player	Apps	Goals	Apps	Goals	Apps	Goals
1	GK	(Australia) AUS	Danny Milosevic	16	0	14	0	2	0
2	DF	(England) ENG	Darren Bazeley	21	0	21	0	0	0
3	DF	(England) ENG	Ronnie Bull	10	0	7	0	3	0
4	DF	(Australia) AUS	John Tambouras	21	0	15+3	0	3	0
5	DF	(New Zealand) NZL	Danny Hay	11	0	9	0	2	0
6	MF	(England) ENG	Neil Emblen	16	1	11+2	1	3	0
7	MF	(Australia) AUS	Steve Fitzsimmons	14	1	8+3	0	3	1
8	MF	(England) ENG	Ben Collett	21	0	15+3	0	3	0
9	FW	(England) ENG	Simon Yeo	12	5	10+1	4	1	1
10	FW	(Republic of Ireland) IRL	Sean Devine	20	3	13+4	3	3	0
11	MF	(Australia) AUS	Zenon Caravella	21	0	20+1	0	0	0
12	DF	(New Zealand) NZL	Cole Tinkler	13	0	9+2	0	2	0
13	FW	(New Zealand) NZL	Jeremy Brockie	14	4	9+3	4	0+2	0
14	MF	(Australia) AUS	Josh Maguire	14	0	7+6	0	1	0
15	DF	(Australia) AUS	Joshua Rose	15	1	10+2	1	2+1	0
16	MF	(New Zealand) NZL	Noah Hickey	19	0	12+5	0	1+1	0
17	DF	(Netherlands) NED	Frank van Eijs	9	0	8	0	1	0
18	FW	(China) CHN	Xiaobin Zhang	15	1	2+10	1	2+1	0
19	FW	(Japan) JPN	Naoki Imaya	10	0	6+4	0	0	0
20	GK	(New Zealand) NZL	Glen Moss	10	0	7+2	0	1	0
21	MF	(New Zealand) NZL	Jeremy Christie	10	1	8+2	1	0	0
22	MF	(New Zealand) NZL	Sam Jasper	2	0	1+1	0	0	0
24	FW	(New Zealand) NZL	Kris Bright	12	0	9+3	0	0	0
30	GK	(New Zealand) NZL	Roy Bell	0	0	0	0	0	0

== Friendlies and pre-season ==
Date	Opponent	Venue	Result	Scorers	Attendance
17 July 2005	Central Coast Mariners	Neutral	0–2		
24 August 2005	Solomon Islands	Home	4–0	Devine, Josh Rose (2), Yeo	

== Competitions ==
=== Pre-season Challenge Cup ===
Date	Opponent	Venue	Result	Scorers	Attendance
24 July 2005	Sydney FC	Away	1-3	Fitzsimmons	8,714
30 July 2005	Queensland Roar	Home	0-5		3,397
6 August 2005	Central Coast Mariners	Home	0-1		2,269

=== A-League ===
Pos	Team	Pld	W	D	L	GF	GA	GD	Pts	Qualification
1	Adelaide United	21	13	4	4	33	25	+8	43	Qualification for 2007 AFC Champions League group stage and Finals series
2	Sydney FC (C)	21	10	6	5	35	28	+7	36	Qualification for 2007 AFC Champions League group stage and Finals series
3	Central Coast Mariners	21	8	8	5	35	28	+7	32	Qualification for Finals series
4	Newcastle Jets	21	9	4	8	27	29	−2	31	Qualification for Finals series
5	Perth Glory	21	8	5	8	34	29	+5	29	
6	Queensland Roar	21	7	7	7	27	22	+5	28	
7	Melbourne Victory	21	7	5	9	26	24	+2	26	
8	New Zealand Knights (Note: New Zealand Knights cannot qualify for the AFC Champions League as they are not recognised as an AFC club.)	21	1	3	17	15	47	−32	6	

Source: ultimatealeague.com
Rules for classification: 1) points; 2) goal difference; 3) number of goals scored.
(C) Champions
Notes:

Date	Opponent	Venue	Result	Scorers	Attendance	Position
28 August 2005	Queensland Roar	Away	0-2		20,725	8
2 September 2005	Sydney FC	Home	1-3	Rose	9,827	8
10 September 2005	Central Coast Mariners	Away	2-0	Yeo, Devine	5,261	7
18 September 2005	Newcastle Jets	Away	0-4		7,495	8
22 September 2005	Perth Glory	Home	0-1		4,138	8
2 October 2005	Adelaide United	Home	1-2	Yeo	3,558	8
10 October 2005	Melbourne Victory	Away	0-3		11,010	8
16 October 2005	Queensland Roar	Home	0-2		4,182	8
21 October 2005	Sydney FC	Away	0-2		11,836	8
29 October 2005	Central Coast Mariners	Home	1-3	Yeo	2,583	8
4 November 2005	Newcastle Jets	Home	2-4	Brockie (2)	2,561	8
11 November 2005	Perth Glory	Away	0-3		9,667	8
20 November 2005	Adelaide United	Away	0-1		9,676	8
26 November 2005	Melbourne Victory	Home	2-3	Christie, Devine	1,922	8
1 December 2005	Queensland Roar	Away	1-1	Yeo	8,607	8
30 December 2005	Sydney FC	Home	2-2	Devine, Brockie	4,212	8
8 January 2006	Central Coast Mariners	Away	0-1		7,257	8
13 January 2006	Newcastle Jets	Away	0-3		6,862	8
19 January 2006	Perth Glory	Home	1-4	Emblen	3,024	8
28 January 2006	Adelaide United	Home	1-1	Zhang	3,079	8
4 February 2006	Melbourne Victory	Away	1-2	Brockie	10,078	8
