= Fermanagh & Western Intermediate Cup =

- Organiser(s): Fermanagh & Western Football Association
- Founded: 2009
- Abolished: 2012
- Region: Northern Ireland
- Most championships: Dergview; Ballinamallard United (1 title each)

The Fermanagh & Western Intermediate Cup was an intermediate soccer competition in Northern Ireland run by the Fermanagh & Western Football Association. It was introduced in 2009 as the first-ever intermediate competition within the Fermanagh & Western area, but discontinued after the 2011/12 season, the Fermanagh & Western Association citing a "general lack of interest by clubs".

== List of finals ==
Season	Winners	Runners-up
2009/10	Dergview	Fivemiletown United
2010/11	Ballinamallard United	Mountjoy United
2011/12	Fivemiletown United v Lisbellaw United	not played

== Summary of winners ==
Team	Wins
Ballinamallard United	1
Dergview	1

== See also ==
- Steel & Sons Cup
- Craig Memorial Cup
- Bob Radcliffe Cup
