= Sandy Fulton =

Northern Irish footballer (1942–2001)

Personal information
- Full name: Alexander John Burns Fulton
- Date of birth: 1942
- Place of birth: Magherafelt, Northern Ireland

Senior career*
Years	Team	Apps	(Gls)
- Enniskillen Rangers
- Coleraine
- Portadown
- Ballymena United
- Linfield
- Enniskillen Rangers
- Cliftonville

International career
	Northern Ireland Youth	4	
- * Club domestic league appearances and goals

Alexander 'Sandy' John Burns Fulton (1942–2001) was the first person from County Fermanagh to play representative football for Northern Ireland.

== Football ==
Sandy Fulton made his debut in 1957 for Enniskillen Rangers at the age of 13 years and four months, scoring in the local derby against Enniskillen Corinthians. In 1958, Enniskillen Rangers won the Mulhern Cup and Mercer Cup. In the Mulhern Cup final, they defeated Enniskillen Corinthians 3–0 at the Broadmeadow. Three days earlier, Corinthians had become the first team from the Fermanagh and Western to win the Irish Junior Cup.

In 1959, Fulton became the first player from the Fermanagh and Western League to make it to the Irish League when he signed for Coleraine F.C. and made his debut at the age of 15. A year later, he moved to Portadown F.C. and a three-year spell with Ballymena United followed. Fulton then played for Linfield F.C. before returning for a year with Enniskillen Rangers. Fulton returned to the Irish League where he played with Cliftonville F.C. until the end of his senior career. Fulton represented Northern Ireland during the 1960/61 season.

Despite considerable interest from English clubs, he missed out on a trial with Wolverhampton Wanderers due to a boat strike and was deemed too old for Chelsea at the age of 21. Fulton returned to Enniskillen Rangers following his senior career. In 2007, he was selected as part of the Fermanagh & Western FA Team Of The Century.

Honours

- Representative Appearances
- Northern Ireland V Wales, Racecourse Ground, Wrexham - Saturday, 11 February 1961
- Northern Ireland V Scotland, Grosvenor Park, Belfast - Saturday, 29 April 1961
- Northern Ireland V England, Old Trafford, Manchester - Saturday, 13 May 1961
- Northern Ireland V Wales, Castlereagh Park, Newtownards - Saturday, 10 February 1962
- Fermanagh & Western Division One
- 1956/57 Champions | Enniskillen Rangers
- 1958/59 Champions | Enniskillen Rangers
- Mulhern Cup
- 1957 Winners | Enniskillen Rangers
- 1958 Winners | Enniskillen Rangers
- 1959 Winners | Enniskillen Rangers
- Lowry-Corry Cup
- 1951 Winners | Derrychara Swifts

== Castlebar Ambush ==
On Sunday 2 September 1973, Fulton was one of three RUC officers ambushed by the IRA during a fishing trip in County Mayo. The fishing party of ten, travelling in two unmarked cars, was ambushed on the road between Westport and Castlebar, near Islandeady. It was reported eight men, some armed with sub-machineguns, opened fire from both sides of the road. Fulton's car was hit six times and he was shot in the arm and leg.

Neither driver was hit and after returning fire, the party escaped the ambush site. The injured men took shelter in a farmhouse and notified Gardai and emergency services. An ambulance conveyed Fulton to Castlebar hospital, where he was treated for his injuries. The injured men were transferred to the Erne Hospital, Enniskillen under heavy guard.

The Gardai speculated the fishing party had been followed across the border and shadowed during their weekend stay. On 5 September, two men, John Fadden and Richard McDonnell, appeared in Castlebar court on charges connected to the ambush.
