= Simon Yeo =

English footballer and coach

Personal information
- Full name: Simon John Yeo
- Date of birth: 20 October 1973
- Place of birth: Stockport, England
- Position: Forward

Team information
- Current team: Mossley (player-coach)

Senior career*
Years	Team	Apps	(Gls)
1997	Ards	4	(1)
1997	Curzon Ashton	4	(4)
1997–1998	Coleraine	0	(0)
1998–2002	Hyde United	130	(77)
1998–1999	→ Atherton Collieries (loan)	7	(12)
2002–2005	Lincoln City	122	(37)
2005	New Zealand Knights	11	(4)
2005–2006	Lincoln City	12	(13)
2006–2007	Peterborough United	13	(2)
2007–2008	Chester City	35	(8)
2008	→ Bury (loan)	8	(0)
2008–2009	Macclesfield Town	33	(7)
2009	Droylsden		
2009–2010	Harrogate Town	9	(1)
2010–2011	New Mills		
2011	Macclesfield Town	0	(0)
Total		381	(146)
- * Club domestic league appearances and goals as of 22:30, 17 April 2009 (UTC)

Simon John Yeo (born 20 October 1973) is an English former professional footballer who played as a forward from 1997 to 2011 and is currently player-coach at Mossley.

Yeo a former member of the British Army is most well known for his time at Lincoln City, where he spent two spells with the club between 2002 and 2006. Yeo was part of the side managed by Keith Alexander that were defeated in the League Two play-off final several times. Before his spells at Sincil Bank Yeo had played in Northern Ireland for Ards and Coleraine at non-league level for Curzon Ashton, Hyde United and Atherton Collieries. In 2005, he left Lincoln for the first time after he was scouted by newly formed A-League side New Zealand Knights and became one of the clubs marquee signings. His stay was only brief and he had returned to Lincoln only months later. In 2006, he followed Keith Alexander firstly to Peterborough United and later Chester City, Bury and Macclesfield Town. In 2009, he returned to non-league football by joining Conference North side Droylsden before later joining Harrogate Town and New Mills. In 2011, he retired from competitive football but following the sudden death of Alexander who was then manager of Macclesfield, he re-signed for the club. Yeo went back into retirement a few months later.

Since retiring Yeo has continued to keep close links with Lincoln City and has appeared in several charity games. He was also a baggage handler at Manchester Airport.

== Army career ==
After leaving school, Yeo began a two-year YTS as a carpet fitter before, in May 1992, joining the army with the 22nd (Cheshire) Regiment. His army career included tours of Bosnia and Northern Ireland.

== Football career ==
After leaving the army, he supplemented his semi-professional football career with numerous jobs such as working on building sites, making toilet seats and being a postman in his home town of Stockport. Whilst serving out his final army days in Northern Ireland, his football career began in earnest. Whilst based at Clogher he played for, Fivemiletown United being part of the team who lost the 1995 Mulhern Cup Final, a competition organised by the Fermanagh & Western FA, to Enniskillen Rangers. He joined Ards in September 1997, signing a twelve-month deal and scoring three times in seven league and cup games before his contract was cancelled to allow him to return home to England to join Curzon Ashton in October 1997. However, he quickly returned to Irish football, joining Coleraine the following month. This move proved controversial with the then Ards manager Roy Coyle claiming that Yeo had stitched him up though Yeo argued that that was not the case and, having scored four goals in four games for Curzon Ashton, he was contacted by Coleraine who offered to fly him in from Manchester for their games.

He remained with Coleraine for the remainder of the 1997–98 season, scoring a total of six goals in 22 appearances, before joining the then Northern Premier League Premier Division side Hyde United. In September 1998 he joined Atherton Collieries on loan, scoring twelve goals in seven games before being sidelined by an ankle ligament injury. Recalled to Hyde, he marked his Northern Premier League debut by scoring both goals in the 2–2 draw with Leigh RMI on 4 December 1998. He would go on to score 111 goals in a total of 169 league and cup appearances for them before joining Lincoln City in May 2002.

Yeo enjoyed two spells with Lincoln City separated by a period playing for the New Zealand Knights in the newly formed A-League. Yeo severed his contract with the Knights because of personal issues. He is something of a cult hero in Lincoln because of his vital goals at the end of the 2002–03 season. He came off the bench to score against Torquay United to put the Lincoln into the Division Three playoffs. Yeo again came to Lincoln's rescue in the playoff semi-final first leg against Scunthorpe United. With the scores tied at 3–3 with 20 minutes remaining Yeo again came off the bench to score 2 goals which put Lincoln firmly in the driving seat. Yeo scored again in the away leg to send them to the final at the Millennium Stadium, which they lost.

Yeo then joined Peterborough for the season of 2006–07 Then he joined Chester City for an undisclosed fee in January 2007, making his debut in a 1–0 win at Accrington Stanley. He was a regular in the starting line-up for the remainder of the season but has tended to be on the bench in the 2007–08 season. On 3 January 2008, he moved to Bury in a long-term loan deal. However, he failed to start a game for the Shakers and he was released by Chester at the end of the season.

On 23 May 2008 it was announced that he would be joining up with his former Manager Keith Alexander once again as he signed with Macclesfield Town, and after one season with Macclesfield, on 5 May 2009 Yeo announced his retirement from football. However, it was later revealed that he joined non-league side Droylsden.

In December 2009, Yeo linked up with his one-time Lincoln City teammate Simon Weaver at Harrogate Town, making his debut for the club in the 1–1 FA Trophy 1st Round tie at Gateshead on 12 December 2009. He made a total of eleven appearances for the club, nine in the Football Conference North, scoring a solitary goal in the 2–0 victory at Vauxhall Motors on 16 February 2010 before signing for New Mills in April 2010. He marked his debut for the Millers by scoring once in a 5–0 North West Counties Football League Premier Division away victory over Alsager Town on 3 April 2010.

On 19 January 2011, he came out of retirement to re-join Macclesfield Town. In July 2016 he was appointed striker-coach at Mossley.
