= Enniskillen Town Hall =

Municipal Building in Enniskillen, Northern Ireland

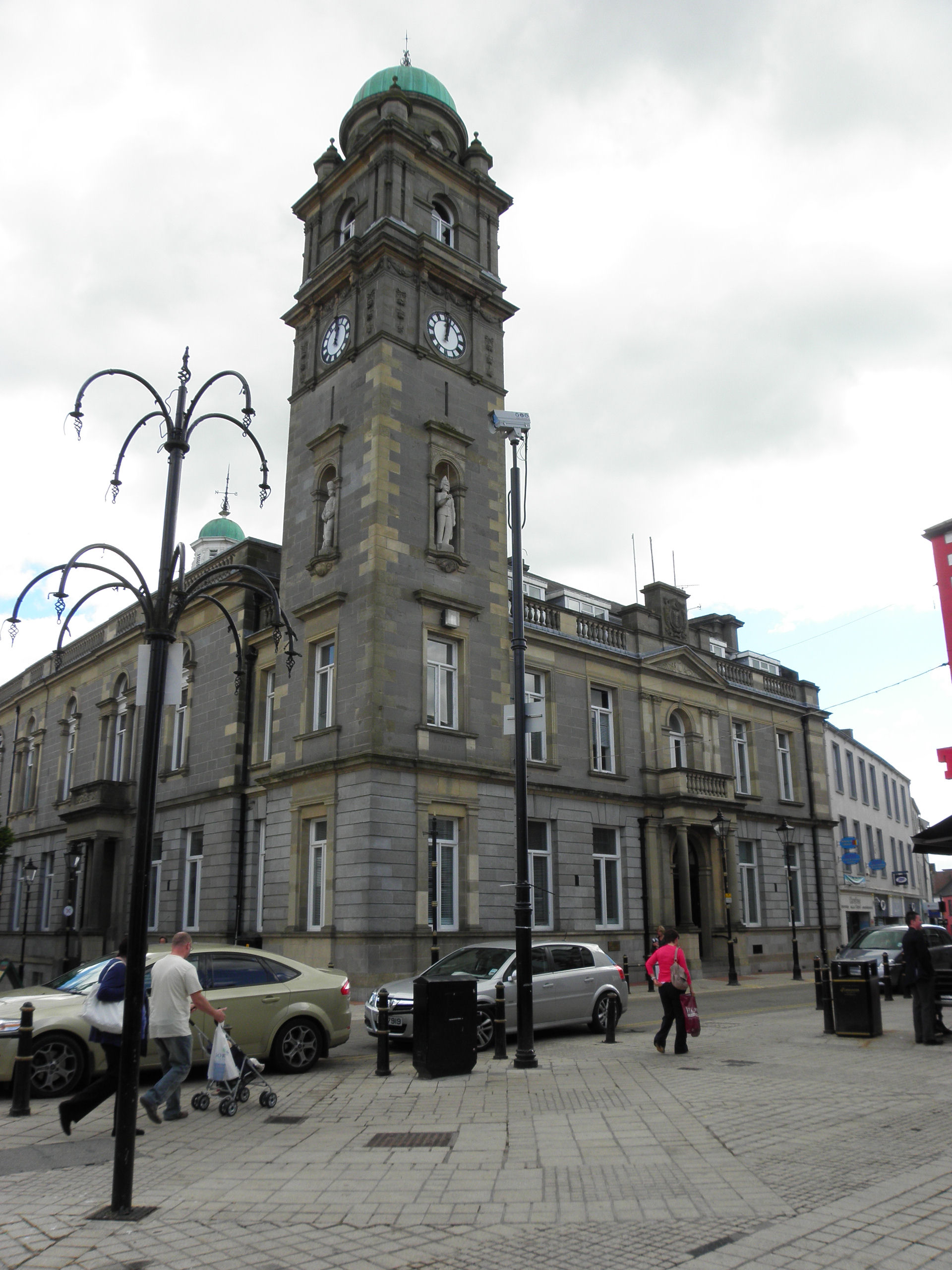
- Enniskillen Town Hall

- Shown in Northern Ireland
- 54.3448°N 7.6385°W
- Location: The Diamond, Enniskillen

History
- Built: 1901; 125 years ago

Site notes
- Architect: William Alphonsus Scott
- Architectural style: Renaissance style

Listed Building – Grade B+
- Official name: Town Hall
- Designated: 20 August 1976
- Reference no.: HB 12/17/001

Enniskillen Town Hall is a municipal structure in The Diamond in Enniskillen, County Fermanagh, Northern Ireland. The town hall, which is one of the meeting places of Fermanagh and Omagh District Council, is a Grade B+ listed building.

== History ==
The current building was commissioned to replace an earlier market house, financed by Sir William Cole, who was closely involved in the Plantation of Ulster, and completed around 1618. In the late 19th century, after the market house became dilapidated, civic leaders decided to construct a new town hall on the same site.

The foundation stone for the new building was laid by Lady Enniskillen on 2 May 1898. It was designed by William Alphonsus Scott of Drogheda in the Renaissance style, built in limestone with Dungannon sandstone dressings at a cost of £13,000 and was officially opened by the Countess of Erne on 6 January 1901. The design involved a symmetrical main frontage with five bays facing onto the Townhall Street; the central bay, which slightly projected forward, featured a Doric order portico with heavy oak doors and a fanlight; there was a balcony and a French door on the first floor with two pairs of Corinthian order pilasters supporting an entablature and a pediment with a coat of arms in the tympanum. In the north western corner of the building there was a six-stage tower with a copper dome. In the third stage of the tower there were niches containing stone statues of soldiers from two local-raised regiments: the 6th (Inniskilling) Dragoons and the Royal Inniskilling Fusiliers. Internally, the principal room was the council chamber.

The building served as the headquarters of Enniskillen Borough Council until it lost its administrative functions to Fermanagh County Council in 1967. After the eastern part of the building had been partitioned into offices in 1980, it went on to become the meeting place of Fermanagh District Council.

On 10 February 2003 the Continuity Irish Republican Army detonated a bomb outside the town hall in anticipation of an intended visit to Northern Ireland by the British Prime Minister, Tony Blair, and the Taoiseach, Bertie Ahern, two days later; three officers from the Police Service of Northern Ireland were hurt in the blast. Together with The Grange in Omagh, the town hall became one of the two meeting places of Fermanagh and Omagh District Council when it was formed in April 2015. After one of the two stone statues of soldiers lost an arm in bad weather, the statutes were repaired in May 2015.

== See also ==
- List of Grade B+ listed buildings in County Fermanagh
