= Mountjoy United F.C. =

Association football club in Northern Ireland

Mountjoy United
- Full name: Mountjoy United Football Club
- Founded: 1974
- Ground: Lisnagirr Road, Omagh.
- Manager: John Elliott
- League: Fermanagh & Western FA

Mountjoy United Football Club is a Junior football club playing in the Fermanagh & Western Division 2 in the North of Ireland. The club is based in Omagh, County Tyrone.

== Intermediate Status ==
Mountjoy United played in the North of Ireland Intermediate league until 2014 when they rejoined the Junior level Fermanagh and Western Football League.

== Youth Football ==
Mountjoy United currently provide Youth Football at all ages from Under 7 mini soccer up to Under 17. Mountjoy United Juniors currently have teams playing in the Mid Ulster Youth Football League at Under 11 and Under 17, they also have teams playing in the Brendan Keogh Youth League at Under 11, Under 12, Under 13, Under 15 and Under 16.
