= Jim Cleary (Northern Irish footballer) =

Northern Ireland footballer

Personal information
- Full name: James Cleary
- Date of birth: 27 May 1956 (age 70)
- Place of birth: Enniskillen, Northern Ireland
- Position: Midfielder

International career
Years	Team	Apps	(Gls)
- Northern Ireland

James Cleary (born 27 May 1956) is a Northern Irish former footballer who played as a midfielder for Enniskillen Rangers, Portadown and Glentoran and the Northern Ireland national team.

== Career ==
Cleary began his career with Enniskillen Rangers before making the step up to the Irish League with Portadown in 1975. He spent five seasons at Portadown before moving to Glentoran in 1980.

He scored in the first round of the 1981–82 European Cup.

He is widely regarded as one of the best footballers to have represented Glentoran in the 1980s, as well as one of the best in the Irish League during this period. Cleary was noted for his passing and shooting skills with his left foot and an excellent scoring record from midfield. Glentoran won two Irish League championships and six Irish Cups during his nine-year stay, which also included a few notable European performances.

Cleary was one of four Irish League players to be included in Billy Bingham's World Cup squad in 1982. He had five caps for the Northern Ireland national football team. He was named the Ulster Footballer of the Year for the 1982/83 season.
