= List of Grade B+ listed buildings in County Fermanagh =

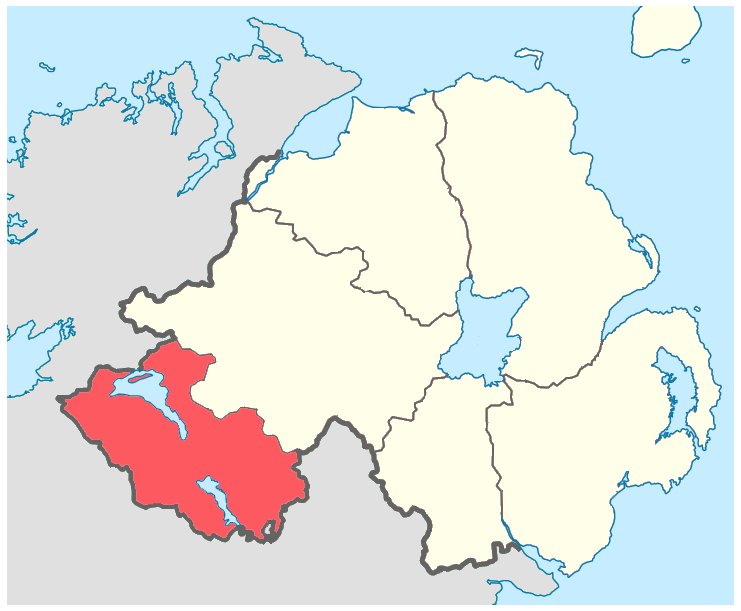
County Fermanagh within Ireland

This is a list of Grade B+ listed buildings in County Fermanagh, Northern Ireland.

In Northern Ireland, the term listed building refers to a building or other structure officially designated as being of "special architectural or historic interest". Grade B+ structures are those considered to be "buildings which might have merited grade A status but for detracting features such as an incomplete design, lower quality additions or alterations. Also included are buildings that because of exceptional features, interiors or environmental qualities are clearly above the general standard set by grade B buildings. A building may merit listing as grade B+ where its historic importance is greater than a similar building listed as grade B."

Listing began later in Northern Ireland than in the rest of the UK; the first provision for listing was contained in the Planning (Northern Ireland) Order 1972, and the current legislative basis for listing is the Planning (Northern Ireland) Order 1991. Under Article 42 of the Order, the Department of the Environment of the Northern Ireland Executive is required to compile lists of buildings of "special architectural or historic interest". The responsibility for the listing process rests with the Northern Ireland Environment Agency (NIEA), an executive agency within the Department of the Environment.

Following the introduction of listing, an initial survey of Northern Ireland's building stock was begun in 1974. By the time of the completion of this First Survey in 1994, the listing process had developed considerably, and it was therefore decided to embark upon a Second Survey to update and cross-check the original information. As of April 2010, the Second Survey had been completed for 147 of Northern Ireland's 547 council wards, and completion is anticipated by 2016. Information gathered during this survey, relating to both listed and unlisted buildings, is entered into the publicly accessible Northern Ireland Buildings Database. A range of listing criteria, which aim to define architectural and historic interest, have been developed by the NIEA, and are used to determine whether or not to list a building.

Once listed, severe restrictions are imposed on the modifications allowed to a building's structure or its fittings. Listed building consent must be obtained from local authorities prior to any alteration to such a structure. There are approximately 8,500 listed buildings in Northern Ireland, representing 2% of the total building stock. Of these, around 580 are listed at Grade B+.

County Fermanagh covers 1,691 square kilometres (653 sq mi), and has a population of around 57,500. The County has 34 Grade B+ listed buildings.

== Listed buildings ==
Building address	Grid Ref. (Note: Sometimes known as OSGB36, the grid reference is based on the British national grid reference system used by the Ordnance Survey.) Geo-coordinates	Type (Note: The type of structure, as identified by the DfC.)	Local authority	Second Survey	Original Survey	HB Number (Note: The "HB Number" is a unique number assigned to each listed building by the DfC.)	Image
Boat House Crom Castle Estate Newtownbutler BT92 8AP		Boat House	Fermanagh	B+	A	HB12/02/002 F	Upload another image See more images
Farmhill Cloncallick Newtownbutler BT92 6DA		House	Fermanagh	B+	B+	HB12/02/096	Upload Photo
Oakfield 23 Knockballymore Road Mullyvannoge Newtownbutler BT92 6JD		House	Fermanagh	B+	B1	HB12/02/072	Upload Photo
124 Keady Road, Derryad BT42 0DF		House	Fermanagh	B+	B1	HB12/03/049	Upload Photo
Holy Cross R.C. Church, Linaskea		Church	Fermanagh		B+	HB12/03/026	Upload Photo
Holy Trinity Church, Castle Balfour Demesne, Linaskea		CHURCH	Fermanagh		B+	HB12/03/035	Upload another image
Colebrook House, Colebrook Demesne, Brookeborough		House	Fermanagh		B+	HB12/04/002	Upload Photo
Nutfield, Brookeborough		House	Fermanagh		B+	HB12/04/070	Upload Photo
Belleisle House, Lisbellaw		House	Fermanagh		B+	HB12/05/032	Upload Photo
Tempo Manor, 4 Tullyreagh Road, Tempo, Enniskillen			Fermanagh		B+	HB12/06/001	Upload Photo
St Margarets (C of I) Church,, Clabby, Fivemiletown		Church	Fermanagh		B+	HB12/06/019	Upload another image
South Lodge (Heather House), 104 Belfast Road, Derryvore, Lisbellaw BT74 4HN		Gates/ Screens/ Lodges	Fermanagh	B+	B1	HB12/07/021	Upload Photo
11 Geaglum Road, Derrycanon, Derrylin, Enniskillen BT92 9GN		House	Fermanagh	B+	B1	HB12/08/040	Upload Photo
Holy Trinity C of I Parish Church, Crom, Derrylin, Enniskillen		Church	Fermanagh		B+	HB12/08/007	Upload another image
70 Croaghrim Road, Florencecourt		House	Fermanagh	B+	B1	HB12/09/007	Upload Photo
House, Clontelaghan TD, Kinawley		House	Fermanagh	B+		HB12/09/072	Upload Photo
Skea Hall, Arney, Enniskillen		Country House	Fermanagh		B+	HB12/10/004	Upload Photo
Hall Craig, Springhill, Enniskillen		House	Fermanagh		B+	HB12/11/001	Upload Photo
Dovecote, Castlehume Ross Inner Derrygonnelly, Enniskillen		Dovecot	Fermanagh		B+	HB12/11/002	Upload Photo
Stable Block, Castlehume Ross Inner Derrygonnelly, Enniskillen		Outbuildings	Fermanagh		B+	HB12/11/003	Upload Photo
Gates and Screen, Ely Lodge Demesne, Ballyhose TL Derrygonnelly, Enniskillen		Gates/ Screens/ Lodges	Fermanagh		B+	HB12/11/088	Upload Photo
Gate Lodge, Ely Lodge Demesne, Ballyhose TL, Derrygonnelly, Enniskillen		Gates/ Screens/ Lodges	Fermanagh		B+	HB12/11/089	Upload Photo
Bridge Laughill/Fassagh Garrison, Enniskillen		Bridge	Fermanagh		B+	HB12/12/015	Upload Photo
Farrancassidy House, Farrancassidy, Belleek, Enniskillen		House	Fermanagh		B+	HB12/12/036	Upload Photo
Public Water Pump and Trough, Main Street, Belleek		Pump	Fermanagh	B+	B2	HB12/13/037	Upload Photo
Belleek Porcelain Factory, 3 Main St., Belleek, Enniskillen		Factory	Fermanagh		B+	HB12/13/025	Upload another image See more images
Necarne Castle (Castle Irvine) Demesne, Irvinestown		Country House	Fermanagh		B+	HB12/15/012	Upload another image See more images
St. Patrick's Church, Castle Archdale, Drummal, Irvinestown		Church	Fermanagh		B+	HB12/15/024	Upload another image
Methodist Church, Darling St., Enniskillen		Church	Fermanagh		B+	HB12/17/024	Upload another image
Town Hall, The Diamond, Enniskillen		Town Hall	Fermanagh		B+	HB12/17/001	Upload another image See more images
St. Michael's R.C. Church, Darling St., Enniskillen		Church	Fermanagh		B+	HB12/17/003	Upload another image See more images
West Gate Lodge, Castle Coole, Enniskillen		Gates/ Screens/ Lodges	Fermanagh		B+	HB12/17/056	Upload Photo
Castle Redoubt Fortifications at Connacht House, Off Henry St., Enniskillen		Fort	Fermanagh		B+	HB12/19/024 A	Upload Photo
Chapel at the Convent of the Sisters of Mercy, Belmore St., Enniskillen		Church	Fermanagh		B+	HB12/20/004 B	Upload Photo
