= League Managers Association Awards =

Annual award in English football

The League Managers Association Awards is an annual award ceremony in English football, awarded by the League Managers Association. The most prestigious award is the LMA Manager of the Year award. It is presented to a manager from any division for his achievements in the prior season. The award is voted by fellow professional managers and as a result consideration is also given to managers who inherit poor sides or financial difficulties and not only those managers who do not have such financial constraints and have won trophies. On only five occasions has the Premier League winning manager won the award compared with the Premier League Manager of the Year award which has been won on all but four occasions by the manager of the team who were league champions. Trophies for the event are hand-crafted by silversmith Thomas Lyte, which also makes trophies for the LG Performance of the Week Award throughout the league season.

== LMA Manager of the Year ==
The LMA Manager of the Year Award is voted by fellow managers and the winner can come from any of the four professional leagues. To date seven have come from outside the Premier League: 1996 winner Peter Reid, who led Sunderland to the Division One title; 1997 winner Danny Wilson, who guided Barnsley into the Premier League; 2000 winner Alan Curbishley who led Charlton to the Division One title; 2006 winner Steve Coppell, who led Reading to win the Championship; 2015 winner Eddie Howe, who guided AFC Bournemouth into the Premier League; 2019 winner Chris Wilder, who took Sheffield United up from the Championship; and 2024 winner Kieran McKenna who guided Ipswich Town to back-to-back promotions from League One to the Premier League.

Year	Manager	Nationality	Club	Ref
1993	Alex Ferguson	Scotland	Manchester United	
1994	Joe Kinnear	Republic of Ireland	Wimbledon	
1995	Frank Clark	England	Nottingham Forest	
1996	Peter Reid	England	Sunderland	
1997	Danny Wilson	Northern Ireland	Barnsley	
1998	Dave Jones	England	Southampton	
1999	Alex Ferguson	Scotland	Manchester United	
2000	Alan Curbishley	England	Charlton Athletic	
2001	George Burley	Scotland	Ipswich Town	
2002	Arsène Wenger	France	Arsenal	
2003	David Moyes	Scotland	Everton	
2004	Arsène Wenger	France	Arsenal	
2005	David Moyes	Scotland	Everton	
2006	Steve Coppell	England	Reading	
2007	Steve Coppell	England	Reading	
2008	Alex Ferguson	Scotland	Manchester United	
2009	David Moyes	Scotland	Everton	
2010	Roy Hodgson	England	Fulham	
2011	Alex Ferguson	Scotland	Manchester United	
2012	Alan Pardew	England	Newcastle United	
2013	Alex Ferguson	Scotland	Manchester United	
2014	Brendan Rodgers	Northern Ireland	Liverpool	
2015	Eddie Howe	England	AFC Bournemouth	
2016	Claudio Ranieri	Italy	Leicester City	
2017	Antonio Conte	Italy	Chelsea	
2018	Pep Guardiola	Spain	Manchester City	
2019	Chris Wilder	England	Sheffield United	
2020	Jürgen Klopp	Germany	Liverpool	
2021	Pep Guardiola	Spain	Manchester City	
2022	Jürgen Klopp	Germany	Liverpool	
2023	Pep Guardiola	Spain	Manchester City	
2024	Kieran McKenna	Northern Ireland	Ipswich Town	
2025	Arne Slot	Netherlands	Liverpool	
2026	Frank Lampard	England	Coventry City	

=== Winners by individual ===
	Manager Name	Wins	Winning years
(Scotland)	Alex Ferguson	5	1993, 1999, 2008, 2011, 2013
(Spain)	Pep Guardiola	3	2018, 2021, 2023
(Scotland)	David Moyes	3	2003, 2005, 2009
(Germany)	Jürgen Klopp	2	2020, 2022
(France)	Arsène Wenger	2	2002, 2004
(England)	Steve Coppell	2	2006, 2007
(Republic of Ireland)	Joe Kinnear	1	1994
(England)	Frank Clark	1	1995
(England)	Peter Reid	1	1996
(Northern Ireland)	Danny Wilson	1	1997
(England)	Dave Jones	1	1998
(England)	Alan Curbishley	1	2000
(Scotland)	George Burley	1	2001
(England)	Roy Hodgson	1	2010
(England)	Alan Pardew	1	2012
(Northern Ireland)	Brendan Rodgers	1	2014
(England)	Eddie Howe	1	2015
(Italy)	Claudio Ranieri	1	2016
(Italy)	Antonio Conte	1	2017
(England)	Chris Wilder	1	2019
(Northern Ireland)	Kieran McKenna	1	2024
(Netherlands)	Arne Slot	1	2025
(England)	Frank Lampard	1	2026

=== Winners by nationality ===
Country	Individuals	Total wins
England	10	11
Scotland	3	9
Northern Ireland	3	3
Italy	2	2
Spain	1	3
France	1	2
Republic of Ireland	1	1
Germany	1	2
Netherlands	1	1

== Divisional Award Winners ==
The divisional award winners are voted by a panel.

Year	Premier League / Premiership		Championship / Division One		League One / Division Two		League Two / Division Three	
Year	Manager	Club	Manager	Club	Manager	Club	Manager	Club
1994	(Scotland) Alex Ferguson	Manchester United					(Northern Ireland) Martin O'Neill	Wycombe Wanderers
1995	(Scotland) Kenny Dalglish	Blackburn Rovers	(Scotland) Bruce Rioch	Bolton Wanderers	(England) Barry Fry	Birmingham City	(Scotland) John Duncan	Chesterfield
1996	(Scotland) Alex Ferguson	Manchester United	(Northern Ireland) Martin O'Neill	Leicester City	(England) Steve McMahon	Swindon Town	(Wales) Tony Pulis	Gillingham
1997	(Scotland) Alex Ferguson	Manchester United						
1998	(France) Arsène Wenger	Arsenal						
1999	(Scotland) Alex Ferguson	Manchester United	(England) Peter Reid	Sunderland	(Scotland) David Moyes	Preston North End	(England) Ray Graydon	Walsall
2000	(Scotland) Alex Ferguson	Manchester United	(England) Alan Curbishley	Charlton Athletic	(Scotland) David Moyes	Preston North End	(England) John Hollins	Swansea City
2001	(Scotland) George Burley	Ipswich Town	(France) Jean Tigana	Fulham	(England) Ronnie Moore	Rotherham United	(England) Mickey Adams	Brighton & Hove Albion
2002	(France) Arsène Wenger	Arsenal	(England) Gary Megson	West Bromwich Albion	(England) Peter Taylor	Brighton & Hove Albion	(Scotland) Paul Sturrock	Plymouth Argyle
2003	(Scotland) Alex Ferguson	Manchester United	(England) Harry Redknapp	Portsmouth	(England) Paul Jewell	Wigan Athletic	(England) Denis Smith	Wrexham
2004	(France) Arsène Wenger	Arsenal	(Northern Ireland) Nigel Worthington	Norwich	(Scotland) Paul Sturrock	Plymouth Argyle	(England) Dave Penney	Doncaster Rovers
2005	(Portugal) José Mourinho	Chelsea	(Republic of Ireland) Mick McCarthy	Sunderland	(England) Mike Newell	Luton Town	(England) Steve Tilson	Southend United
2006	(Portugal) José Mourinho	Chelsea	(England) Steve Coppell	Reading	(England) Steve Tilson	Southend United	(England) Paul Simpson	Carlisle United
2007	(Scotland) Alex Ferguson	Manchester United	(Republic of Ireland) Roy Keane	Sunderland	(England) Russell Slade	Yeovil Town	(Northern Ireland) Danny Wilson	Hartlepool United
2008	(Scotland) Alex Ferguson	Manchester United	(England) Tony Mowbray	West Bromwich Albion	(Spain) Roberto Martínez	Swansea City	(England) Graham Turner	Hereford United
2009	(Scotland) Alex Ferguson	Manchester United	(Republic of Ireland) Mick McCarthy	Wolverhampton Wanderers	(Scotland) Darren Ferguson	Peterborough United	(England) Paul Tisdale	Exeter City
2010	(England) Harry Redknapp	Tottenham Hotspur	(Republic of Ireland) Chris Hughton	Newcastle United	(Scotland) Paul Lambert	Norwich City	(England) Keith Hill	Rochdale
2011	(Scotland) Alex Ferguson	Manchester United	(Scotland) Paul Lambert	Norwich City	(Uruguay) Gus Poyet	Brighton & Hove Albion	(Republic of Ireland) John Sheridan	Chesterfield
2012	(England) Alan Pardew	Newcastle United	(England) Brian McDermott	Reading	(England) Chris Powell	Charlton Athletic	(Italy) Paolo Di Canio	Swindon Town
2013	(Scotland) Alex Ferguson	Manchester United	(Scotland) Malky Mackay	Cardiff City	(England) Gary Johnson	Yeovil Town	(England) Martin Allen	Gillingham
2014	(Wales) Tony Pulis	Crystal Palace	(England) Nigel Pearson	Leicester City	(Wales) Kenny Jackett (England) Russell Slade	Wolverhampton Wanderers; Leyton Orient	(England) Russ Wilcox	Scunthorpe United
2015	(Portugal) José Mourinho	Chelsea	(England) Eddie Howe	AFC Bournemouth	(England) Steve Cotterill	Bristol City	(England) Gareth Ainsworth	Wycombe Wanderers
2016	(Italy) Claudio Ranieri	Leicester City	(Republic of Ireland) Chris Hughton	Brighton and Hove Albion	(Scotland) Gary Caldwell	Wigan Athletic	(England) Chris Wilder	Northampton Town
2017	(Italy) Antonio Conte	Chelsea	(Republic of Ireland) Chris Hughton	Brighton and Hove Albion	(England) Chris Wilder	Sheffield United	(England) Paul Cook	Portsmouth
2018	(Spain) Pep Guardiola	Manchester City	(Portugal) Nuno Espírito Santo	Wolverhampton Wanderers	(England) Paul Hurst	Shrewsbury Town	(England) John Coleman	Accrington Stanley
2019	(Spain) Pep Guardiola	Manchester City	(England) Chris Wilder	Sheffield United	(England) Mick Harford	Luton Town	(England) Danny Cowley	Lincoln City
2020	(Germany) Jürgen Klopp	Liverpool	(Argentina) Marcelo Bielsa	Leeds United	(England) Mark Robins	Coventry City	(Gibraltar) David Artell	Crewe Alexandra
2021	(Spain) Pep Guardiola	Manchester City	(Germany) Daniel Farke	Norwich City	(Northern Ireland) Grant McCann	Hull City	(Northern Ireland) Michael Duff	Cheltenham Town
2022	(Germany) Jürgen Klopp	Liverpool	(Portugal) Marco Silva	Fulham	(England) Leam Richardson	Wigan Athletic	(England) Matt Taylor	Exeter City
2023	(Spain) Pep Guardiola	Manchester City	(Belgium) Vincent Kompany	Burnley	(England) Steven Schumacher	Plymouth Argyle	(England) Richie Wellens	Leyton Orient
2024	(Spain) Pep Guardiola	Manchester City	(Northern Ireland) Kieran McKenna	Ipswich Town	(England) John Mousinho	Portsmouth	(England) Dave Challinor	Stockport County
2025	(Netherlands) Arne Slot	Liverpool	(Germany) Daniel Farke	Leeds United	(England) Chris Davies	Birmingham City	(Northern Ireland) Grant McCann	Doncaster Rovers
2026	(Spain) Mikel Arteta	Arsenal	(England) Frank Lampard	Coventry City	(England) Michael Skubala	Lincoln City	(England) Andy Woodman	Bromley

== FA Cup Manager of the Year ==
Year	Manager	Nationality	Club	Ref
2012	Roberto Di Matteo	Italy	Chelsea	
2013	Roberto Martínez	Spain	Wigan Athletic	
2014	Nigel Clough	England	Sheffield United	
2015	Phil Parkinson	England	Bradford City	

== Winners by individual ==
The following managers have won two or more awards.

	Manager Name	Total Wins	LMA Manager of the Year	Premier League / Premiership	Championship / Division One	League One / Division Two	League Two / Division Three	FA Cup
(Scotland)	Alex Ferguson	16	5	11				
(Spain)	Pep Guardiola	7	3	4				
(Scotland)	David Moyes	5	3			2		
(France)	Arsène Wenger	5	2	3				
(England)	Chris Wilder	4	1		1	1	1	
(Germany)	Jürgen Klopp	4	2	2				
(England)	Steve Coppell	3	2		1			
(Portugal)	José Mourinho	3		3				
(Republic of Ireland)	Chris Hughton	3			3			
(Scotland)	George Burley	2	1	1				
(England)	Alan Pardew	2	1	1				
(Italy)	Claudio Ranieri	2	1	1				
(Italy)	Antonio Conte	2	1	1				
(Netherlands)	Arne Slot	2	1	1				
(England)	Eddie Howe	2	1		1			
(England)	Peter Reid	2	1		1			
(England)	Alan Curbishley	2	1		1			
(Northern Ireland)	Danny Wilson	2	1				1	
(Northern Ireland)	Kieran McKenna	2	1		1			
(England)	Harry Redknapp	2		1	1			
(Wales)	Tony Pulis	2		1			1	
(Republic of Ireland)	Mick McCarthy	2			2			
(Germany)	Daniel Farke	2			2			
(Scotland)	Paul Lambert	2			1	1		
(Northern Ireland)	Martin O'Neill	2			1		1	
(England)	Russell Slade	2				2		
(Scotland)	Paul Sturrock	2				1	1	
(England)	Steve Tilson	2				1	1	
(Spain)	Roberto Martínez	2				1		1

=== Wins by country ===
	Total country wins	Wins by Managers	LMA Manager of the Year	Premier League / Premiership	Championship / Division One	League One / Division Two	League Two / Division Three	FA Cup
(England) England	62	50	10	2	11	19	21	2
(Scotland) Scotland	32	11	8	13	3	6	2	
(Spain) Spain	9	2	3	4		1		1
(Northern Ireland) Northern Ireland	9	6	3		3		3	
(Republic of Ireland) Ireland	8	6	1		6		1	
(France) France	6	2	2	3	1			
(Germany) Germany	6	2	2	2	2			
(Italy) Italy	6	4	2	2			1	1
(Portugal) Portugal	5	3		3	2			
(Wales) Wales	3	2		1		1	1	
(Netherlands) Netherlands	2	1	1	1				
(Argentina) Argentina	1	1		1				
(Belgium) Belgium	1	1			1			
(Gibraltar) Gibraltar	1	1				1		
(Uruguay) Uruguay	1	1				1		

== Special Merit Award ==
Also referred to as Service to Football Award.

Year	Nationality	Name	Notes
2002	England	Bobby Robson	
2004	England	Don Howe	Service to youth coaching.
2006	Spain	Rafael Benítez	Champions League win in first season at Liverpool.
2007	England	Dario Gradi	Long service to Crewe Alexandra.
2009	Scotland	Alex Ferguson	Champions League win, Club World Cup win and third league title in a row.
2010	England	Steve McClaren	Winning the Eredivisie with FC Twente, their first championship in their 45-year history.
2011	Scotland	Alex Ferguson	Surpassing 2,000 competitive games and becoming Manchester United's longest serving manager.
2012	England	Lee Clark	Record 42 Football League games unbeaten
2013	Italy	Roberto Di Matteo	Winning the FA Cup and Champions League with Chelsea
2013	England	Phil Parkinson	Taking Bradford to League Two play-off promotion and the League Cup Final.

== John Duncan Award ==
Awarded to an individual chosen by the LMA board who has accomplished something significant in the field of football, or represents the passion and service to football that it was said John Duncan personified.

Year	Nationality	Name	Reason
2023	Scotland	Lou Macari	Awarded for Macari's work creating the Macari Foundation which is helping people impacted by homelessness in Stoke-on-Trent.
2024	England	Roy Hodgson	Awarded for reaching 1250 games in professional management.
2025	Austria	Oliver Glasner	Awarded for winning a first major trophy with Crystal Palace.
2025	Australia	Ange Postecoglou	Awarded for winning the Europa League with Tottenham Hotspur
2025	England	Eddie Howe	Awarded for winning the EFL Cup with Newcastle United (first major trophy in 70 years)
2025	Netherlands	Renée Slegers	Awarded for winning the UEFA Women’s Champions League with Arsenal Women
2025	France	Sonia Bompastor	Awarded for winning the Domestic Treble (Women's Super League, Women's FA Cup, FA Women's League Cup) with Chelsea Women
