= William Emerson (footballer) =

Irish footballer

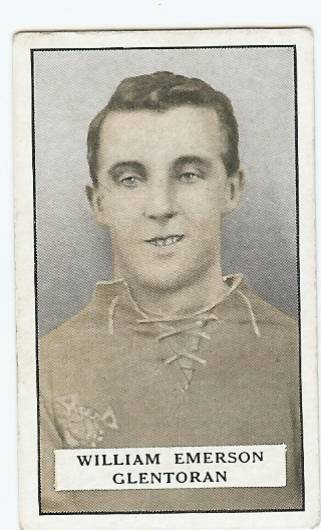

Personal information
- Full name: William John Emerson
- Date of birth: 16 December 1891
- Place of birth: Enniskillen, Ireland
- Date of death: 19 January 1961 (aged 69)
- Height: 5 ft 6 1/4 in (1.68 m)
- Position: Midfielder

Senior career*
Years	Team	Apps	(Gls)
1912–1922	Glentoran	285	(11)
1922–1924	Burnley	45	(0)
1924–1925	Glentoran	23	(1)
1925–1926	Dundela	-	(-)
1926–1927	Linfield	19	(1)
1927–1928	Willowfield	-	(-)
1929–1930	Dundela	-	(-)

International career
1919–1923	Ireland	11	(1)
- * Club domestic league appearances and goals

William Emerson (16 December 1891 – 19 January 1961) was an Irish football player, who played as a midfielder for Burnley and Glentoran.

== Club career ==
Known as a talented right half, Billy Emerson got his start in the Owen O'Cork club on east Belfast's Beersbridge Road, a small club that saw many young players continue to play for its big league neighbours, Glentoran.

After being snapped up by the Glens in 1912, he made five appearances, scoring three goals in wins against Derry City and Shelbourne. Glentoran finished as champions that season and the following year, Emerson was part of the successful team that lifted both the Irish Cup and City Cup. He was also part of the squad that traveled to the continent and brought back the Vienna Cup. William Emerson made almost 300 appearances for Glentoran before joining Burnley during the 1921–22 season.

Emerson first met the Burnley team in Vienna in 1914 when his club toured Europe and Burnley secured his transfer towards the end of the 1921–22 season. Emerson made his debut for the then reigning league champions in front of 30,000 spectators in a 1-1 draw with Cardiff City. He spent parts of three seasons at Turf Moor playing 45 times, but like some of his Glentoran colleagues before him, moved back to the Oval.

After departing Burnley, Billy Emerson returned to Belfast where he played with Glentoran for two more years until 1926. In his two spells at the Oval, Emerson made more than 300 appearances. He also played with Glentoran's cross city rivals Linfield and also enjoyed two spells back in east Belfast with Dundela.

== International career ==
Emerson earned his first cap for pre-partition Ireland against England in October 1919. He would earn a further 10 caps for Ireland, scoring once. Five of his caps were earned at Burnley while the remaining six he won while on Glentoran's books. His six caps while at Glentoran makes him the most capped player in the club's history.

All 11 of Emerson's Ireland caps came in Home International Championship games. His last cap came on 20 October 1923 in a 2-1 victory over England in Belfast.
