= Ted Keenan =

Personal information
- Born: 1934 Enniskillen, Northern Ireland
- Died: September 24, 2013 (aged 78–79) Enniskillen, Northern Ireland

Sport
- Sport: Swimming

Ted Keenan (1934–24 September 2013) was from Enniskillen in Northern Ireland. He was the first Irish man to swim the English Channel, the North Channel and the Bristol Channel and set a record that still stands as of 2017.

Keenan died in 2013 and a year later was posthumously awarded the Sporting Great accolade at The Impartial Reporter Sport's Awards.

In 2017 his achievements were celebrated with an exhibition at the Fermanagh County Museum from 1 July.

== Main Achievements ==
- 1972 he became the first Irish man to swim the English Channel (18 hours 11 minutes)
- 1973 swam the North Channel (18 hours 27 minutes)
- 1975 swam the Bristol Channel (14 hours 26 minutes) broke the record

== Awards ==
- 2004 Sporting Great accolade at The Impartial Reporter Sport's Awards
- 1984 Inducted in "Marathon Swimming Hall of Fame" Fort Lauderdale, Florida
