= Dunbreen Rovers =

Association football club in Northern Ireland

- Nickname(s): The Old Lady, The Rovers, The Warriors, The Crazy Gang
- Founded: 1963
- Ground: Youth Sport Omagh
- League: Fermanagh and Western
Home colours	Away colours	Third colours

Dunbreen Rovers are a junior football club playing in the Fermanagh And Western Football League. The club, formed in 1963, hailing from Omagh, County Tyrone, the Firsts and Reserves play their home games at Youthsport, Omagh and the Third team play their home games at Omagh Leisure Complex.

== Honours ==
- Mulhern Cup: 1 - 1968
- Mercer Cup: Runners Up - 1975/76, 1977/78
- Reihill Cup: Runners Up - 2015/16

=== Successes and Promotions ===
1st Team:

- 2nd Division 2006/07 (runners up)
- 3rd Division 2015/16 (winners)
- 3rd Division League Cup 2012/13 (runners up)

Reserves:

- 2nd Division 2005/06 (winners), 2013/14 (runners up)
- 3rd Division 2009/10 (runners up), 2012/13 (winners)
