= Kieran McKenna =

Northern Irish football manager (born 1986)

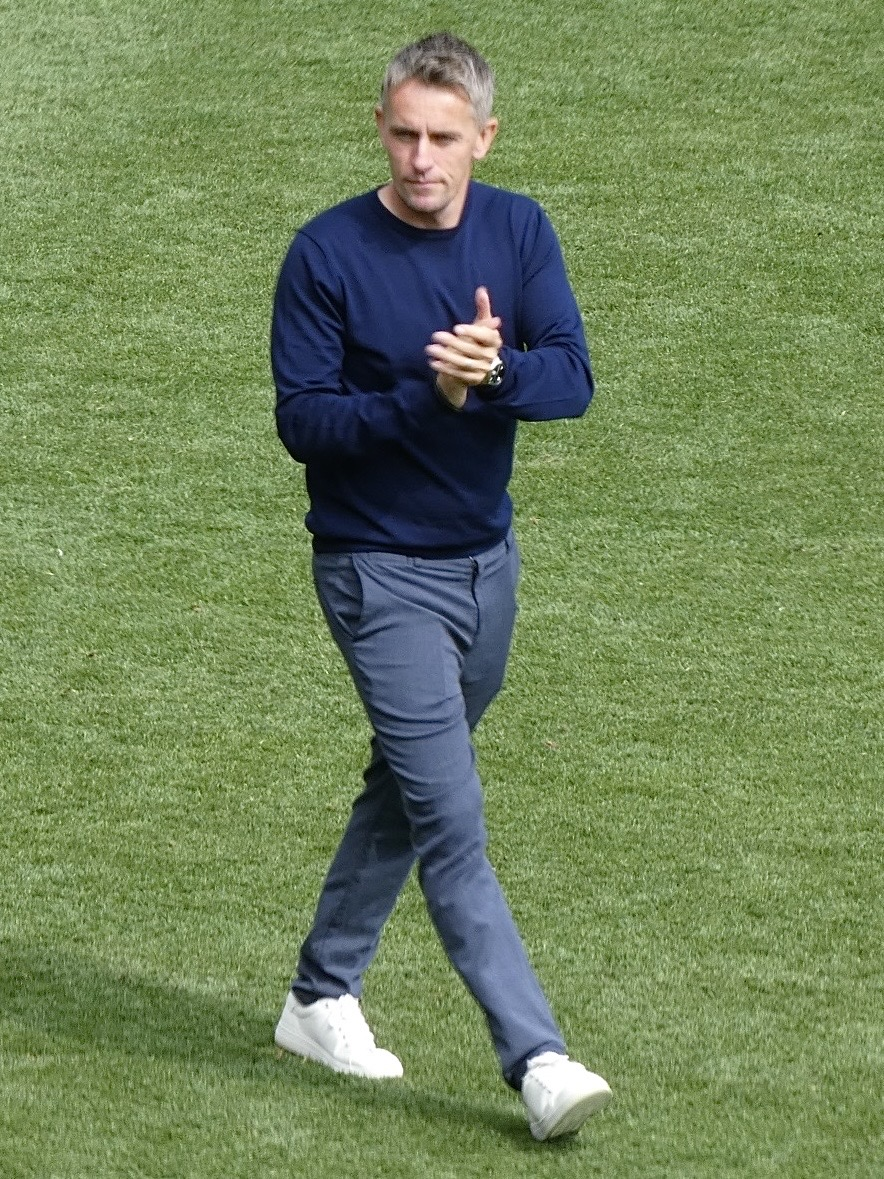
- McKenna in 2024

Personal information
- Date of birth: 14 May 1986 (age 40)
- Place of birth: London, England
- Height: 5 ft 9 in (1.75 m)
- Position: Midfielder

Youth career
- 1997–2001: Enniskillen Town United
- 2001–2002: Ballinamallard United
- 2002–2009: Tottenham Hotspur

International career
Years	Team	Apps	(Gls)
2004–2005	Northern Ireland U19	5	(0)
2005–2007	Northern Ireland U21	7	(1)

Managerial career
- 2021–2026: Ipswich Town

Kieran McKenna (born 14 May 1986) is a professional football manager and former player who was most recently the manager of Premier League club Ipswich Town.

Born in England, McKenna was raised in Northern Ireland and played youth football for Enniskillen Town United and Ballinamallard United before joining Tottenham Hotspur in 2002, and had represented Northern Ireland at youth level before a hip injury curtailed his playing career.

After studying sports science at Loughborough University, McKenna coached Tottenham Hotspur and Manchester United at under-18 level, and also worked as a first-team coach and assistant manager at Manchester United before being appointed as manager of Ipswich Town in 2021.

== Early life ==
McKenna was born in London, and was raised in the Northern Irish county of Fermanagh.

== Playing career ==
McKenna began his footballing career as a youth team player at Northern Irish sides Enniskillen Town United and Ballinamallard United. He joined Tottenham Hotspur as a youth player in 2002, after signing a scholarship contract with Spurs.

McKenna represented Northern Ireland at both under-19 and under-21 level. He was made captain of Northern Ireland's under-19s side at the 2005 UEFA European Under-19 Championship by coach Mal Donaghy. In 2009, at the age of 22, McKenna retired from playing due to an ongoing hip injury which prevented him from making a senior first-team appearance for Tottenham.

== Coaching career ==
=== Early roles and development ===
After retiring from playing, McKenna started his career in coaching whilst studying a sports science degree at Loughborough University. During his time studying, McKenna spent time as a youth coach at Tottenham Hotspur, Leicester City, Nottingham Forest, and Canadian side Vancouver Whitecaps.

=== Tottenham Hotspur ===
Upon graduating from Loughborough University, McKenna was hired as the Head of Academy Performance Analysis at Tottenham Hotspur. He was offered the role of Academy Coach at Liverpool, but remained at Spurs, coaching various age groups at the Tottenham Academy set-up, before being placed in charge of Tottenham Hotspur's under-18s side. During his tenure at Tottenham, McKenna guided the under-18s to the semi-final of the FA Youth Cup in 2015.

=== Manchester United ===
In August 2016, McKenna left his role at Tottenham to join the academy set-up at Manchester United, becoming the club's under-18s manager. In his second season in charge of the under-18s, McKenna guided Manchester United to the Premier League Northern Division title.

Along with former United player Michael Carrick, McKenna was promoted to the first-team coaching staff and replaced Rui Faria as José Mourinho's assistant manager, ahead of the 2018–19 Premier League season.

Following a poor start to the 2018–19 season, Mourinho left United on 18 December 2018, and was replaced the next day by former United striker Ole Gunnar Solskjær, who was appointed as caretaker manager, and retained both McKenna and Carrick in their coaching positions. McKenna was retained in his role by interim manager Ralf Rangnick following Solskjær's departure as United manager in November 2021.

== Managerial career ==
=== Ipswich Town ===
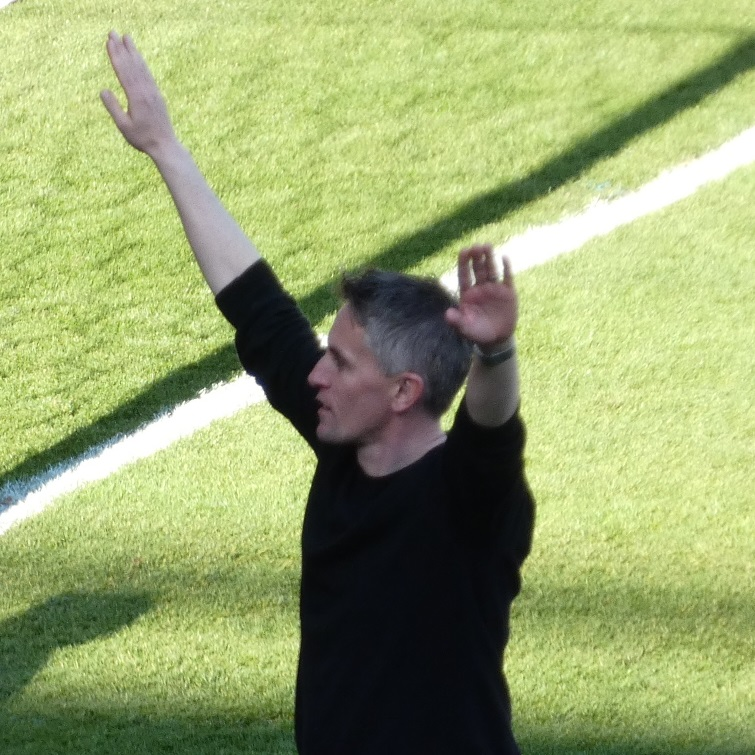
McKenna after Ipswich Town sealed promotion to the Championship in 2023

On 16 December 2021, McKenna was appointed as manager of League One side Ipswich Town, signing a three-and-a-half-year contract. He officially took charge on 20 December, alongside his newly appointed assistant Martyn Pert. McKenna's first game in charge of Ipswich saw his side win 1–0 against Wycombe Wanderers at Portman Road. McKenna's first away game in charge was a 4–0 win against Gillingham. McKenna's arrival saw a quick upturn in Ipswich's form, winning seven of his first ten games in charge, keeping seven clean sheets in the process. Under McKenna, Ipswich went 11 matches unbeaten through February and March, including setting a new club record for not conceding a goal, surpassing the previous record of 547 minutes. Despite the improvement in form, Ipswich failed to reach the League One play-offs, eventually finishing in 11th place in League One. Ipswich ended the 2021–22 season with a 4–0 home win against Charlton Athletic on 30 April.

During the 2022–23 season, McKenna was awarded the EFL League One Manager of the Month award for March 2023 as his side maintained their automatic promotion push. On 29 April 2023, Ipswich secured promotion to the EFL Championship after beating Exeter City 6–0 at home, with five of those goals coming within the first thirty-two minutes. He was later awarded Manager of the Month for April. Ipswich finished the season in second place in League One to gain automatic promotion to the EFL Championship, following a 19-game unbeaten run. At the end of the 2022–23 season, McKenna signed a new four-year contract, extending his stay at Portman Road until 2027.

Ipswich started the 2023–24 season well and a run of four wins and a draw saw McKenna pick up the EFL Championship Manager of the Month award for September. He won the award for a second time in March 2024 as Ipswich won four of their five matches to maintain their automatic promotion push. McKenna was named as the EFL Championship Manager of the Season for the 2023–24 season as Ipswich finished second in the EFL Championship to win promotion to the Premier League for the first time since 2002. McKenna's Ipswich side accumulated 194 points and scored 193 goals over two seasons as they became the first club since Southampton in 2012 to secure back-to-back promotions from League One to the Premier League. Despite being approached by fellow Premier League sides Chelsea and Brighton & Hove Albion, McKenna signed a new four-year contract to extend his stay at Portman Road until 2028.

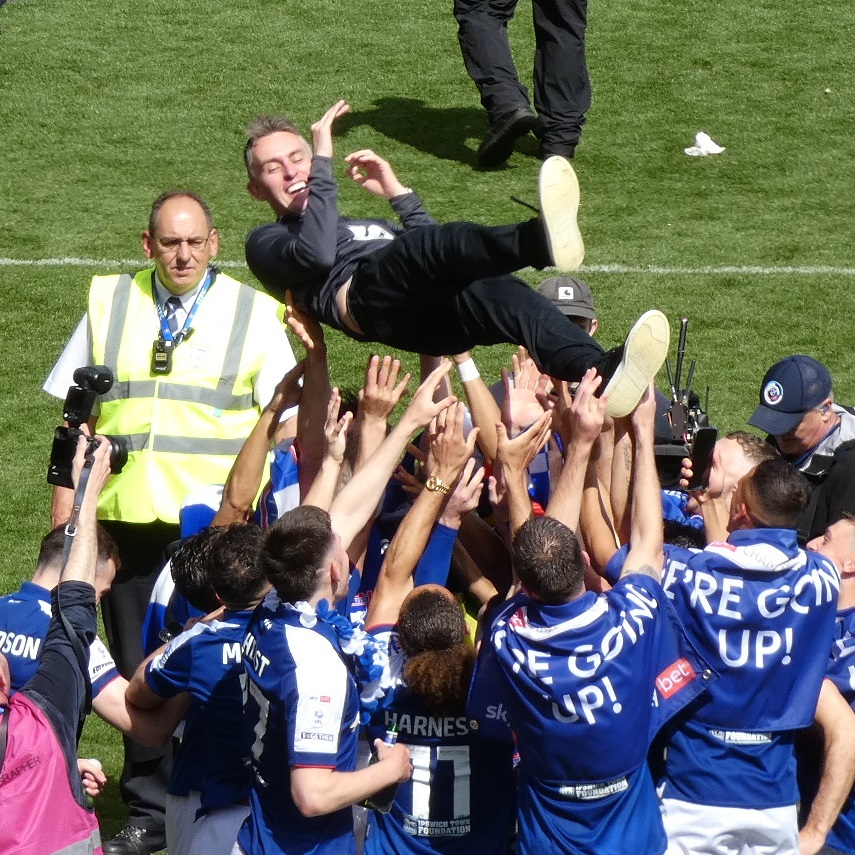
McKenna is thrown into the air by his Ipswich Town players after promotion to the Premier League in 2024

At the start of the 2024–25 season, McKenna lost three games in a row for the first time, after a home defeat to Liverpool, an away defeat to Manchester City, and then losing on penalties to AFC Wimbledon in the EFL Cup. Ipswich picked up their first point of their Premier League campaign with a 1–1 draw with Fulham. The winless run with Ipswich stretched to nine games, after they fell to a home defeat to Everton on 19 October. This was Ipswich's worst start to a season since 2018–19. McKenna picked up his first win in the Premier League in a 2–1 away victory on 10 November against Tottenham Hotspur, bringing Ipswich out of the relegation zone. This was Ipswich's first top-flight win since April 2002.

Ipswich were relegated from the Premier League after winning just four games under McKenna, with Ipswich having picked up their lowest ever points total in the top flight. McKenna's 10.5% win rate is among the lowest recorded by any manager in Premier League history. McKenna oversaw a large overhaul of his squad following relegation, with only six players remaining in the squad from the teams that achieved back-to-back promotions, and also having lost key players such as Liam Delap and Omari Hutchinson to Premier League clubs in the summer. Also among the departures was defender Luke Woolfenden, who claimed that the team selections under McKenna had become "political" following his departure after 12 years at the club.

Ipswich started their 2025–26 season under McKenna by drawing three and losing two, between games in the EFL Championship and a defeat to EFL League Two side Bromley in the EFL Cup. Ipswich gained their first win of the season in September, with a 5–0 home victory in the Championship against Sheffield United. Having built on this first win, his side gained a total of seven points from three matches across September 2025, with McKenna named EFL Championship Manager of the Month in the process. McKenna became the first Ipswich manager to win an East Anglian derby game since 2009, when Ipswich defeated Norwich City 3–1 on 5 October. Ipswich had won just seven of their last 48 games under McKenna by 22 October. Nevertheless, McKenna won his second Manager of the Month award of the season for December, after Ipswich picked up fourteen points from seven matches, including defeating league leaders Coventry City both home and away without conceding. Ipswich defeated Norwich City again in April 2026, with McKenna becoming the first manager to complete a league double over Norwich since the 1992–93 season, which continued their promotion chasing form.

On 2 May 2026, McKenna guided Ipswich Town back to the Premier League after a year away, finishing as runners-up in the Championship on 84 points. This marked McKenna's third promotion in four seasons at the club. On 10 June 2026, McKenna announced his departure from Ipswich Town, in order to take a break from football management.

== Managerial style ==
Upon his arrival at Ipswich Town, McKenna flipped his side to using three defenders, operating between a 3–4–1–2 and 3–4–2–1 formation, contrasting to previous back four structures implemented by his predecessors. McKenna became enthusiastic about establishing a double pivot in midfield, allowing them to make more runs and movements across the pitch whilst providing support for the more isolated wing-backs. During Ipswich's 2022–23 promotion-winning campaign, McKenna reverted to a back four, adopting a 4–2–3–1 formation, allowing his double pivot structure to be retained. That season, Ipswich had the most possession, most passes and third-lowest long-ball count in EFL League One. This short-passing style saw the double pivot build through the thirds, passing into the opposition half.

Following McKenna's arrival as Manchester United's under-18s manager, Indy Boonen, who was a teenage player for United at the time, praised McKenna by stating, "He changed everything. The way we trained was how the opponent played on the Saturday. If you played against West Brom, you trained how they are and focused on their weaknesses." Jim Magilton, the Irish Football Association's elite performance director, agreed with Boonen's appraisal of McKenna commenting, "He is a meticulous planner yet every session is spontaneous. Nothing is set in stone. He adjusts the session to how the players are and gets what he wants out of the session. Everything is linked and game related. Nothing is for show – it has to be about the game."

== Personal life ==
McKenna is married and has two children.

Since his childhood, McKenna has been a supporter of Manchester United, with reports claiming that his love for the club influenced his decision to leave Tottenham Hotspur for the Red Devils in 2016.

McKenna also played Gaelic football for the minors of the Enniskillen Gaels club. In 2024, McKenna was given an Honorary Doctorate by the University of Suffolk.

== Managerial statistics ==
As of match played 2 May 2026

Managerial record by team and tenure
Team	From	To	Record				
Team	From	To	P	W	D	L	Win %
Ipswich Town	20 December 2021	10 June 2026	222	105	64	53	47.3
Total			222	105	64	53	47.3

== Honours ==
=== Manager ===
Manchester United U18

- U18 Premier League Northern Division: 2017–18

Ipswich Town

- EFL League One runner-up: 2022–23
- EFL Championship runner-up: 2023–24, 2025–26

Individual

- EFL League One Manager of the Month: March 2023, April 2023
- EFL Championship Manager of the Month: September 2023, March 2024, September 2025, December 2025
- EFL Championship Manager of the Season: 2023–24
- LMA Manager of the Year: 2023–24
- LMA Awards – EFL Championship Manager of the Year: 2023–24
