= Enniskillen Rangers F.C. =

Association football club in Northern Ireland

Enniskillen Rangers
- Full name: Enniskillen Rangers Football Club
- Nickname: The Gers
- Founded: 1953
- Ground: The Ball Range, Enniskillen
- Manager: Darren Higginbotham
- League: Fermanagh & Western Division One

Enniskillen Rangers is a Northern Irish football club located in Enniskillen, County Fermanagh and play in the Fermanagh & Western League Division 1. Formed in 1953, Enniskillen Rangers play in the Fermanagh and Western Football League Division One and have the longest continuous membership in the league.

Rangers have won the Irish Junior Cup five times and runners-up four times. They have been Fermanagh & Western Division One champions nineteen times and Mulhern Cup winners sixteen times.

Between 1962 and 1966, the club won five Division One titles in a row. The 1999 season was the club's most successful, when they won the Irish Junior Cup, the First Division and the Mulhern Cup.

The club won the 2017 Irish Junior Cup and in 2018, defended their title, winning back-to-back Irish Junior Cups for the first time in their history. In 2019, Enniskillen Rangers created history winning the prestigious Irish Junior Cup for a third time in a row.

== Ground ==
For the first fifteen years Rangers played at the old Broadmeadow ground, sharing it with Enniskillen Corinthians. This was followed by a ten-year spell at the Commons, Bellanaleck, before they acquired a hundred-year lease from Fermanagh District Council for the ground at McLaughlin's Field, Derrychara. After Fermanagh District Council sold the Derrychara site in 2004, the club spent a number of years playing at the Lakeland Forum Playing Fields, while searching for a suitable site to develop their own facilities.

After a difficult and protracted process, Rangers acquired land at Woaghternerry on the outskirts of Enniskillen and engaged Prunty Contacts Ltd to construct two sand-based pitches on the ten acre site. In the spring and summer of 2015, a clubhouse with changing rooms to Intermediate standard, fences enclosing the main pitch, turnstiles and car parking for 200 cars were constructed.

Rangers took up residence for the start of the 2015–16 season. The new grounds are located on the site of an old shooting range used by Enniskillen Rifle Association in the late nineteenth century and by the military, the police and American Army in the first half of the twentieth century. Older locals still refer to the general area as “the Ball Range” so the club continued with the name when the grounds were put to a new sporting use. The ground has subsequently been improved by the addition of spectator stands and a VIP/Players' Lounge.

== Honours ==
Enniskillen Rangers Honours
Type	Competition	Titles	Seasons
Irish Junior Cup	Champions	5	1998/99, 2016/17, 2017/18, 2018-19, 2023-24
Irish Junior Cup	Runners-Up	4	1974/75, 1988/89, 1999/00, 2019-20
Fermanagh & Western League Division One	Champions	19	1954/55, 1956/57, 1958/59, 1961/62, 1962/63, 1963/64, 1964/65, 1965/66, 1972/73, 1976/77, 1981/82, 1987/88, 1989/90, 1990/91, 1991/92, 1998/99, 2017/18, 2018/19, 2023/24
Fermanagh & Western League Division One	Runners-Up	14	1955/56, 1957/58, 1967/68, 1968/69, 1971/72, 1973/74, 1974/75, 1982/83, 1983/84, 1984/85, 1988/89, 1993/94, 2001/02, 2019/20
Mulhern Cup	Winners	16	1956, 1957, 1958, 1959, 1962, 1964, 1965, 1978, 1981, 1982, 1984, 1988, 1993, 1995, 1999, 2022
Mulhern Cup	Runners-Up	6	1977, 1986, 1989, 1992, 1994, 1998
Kennedy Cup	Winners	11	1972, 1973, 1975, 1978, 1982, 1988, 1991, 2017, 2018, 2019, 2022
Lowry-Corry Cup	Winners	1	2014

- record

== Irish Junior Cup ==
Enniskillen Rangers have played in nine Irish Junior Cup finals and won the trophy five times. After defeats in the 1975 and 1989 Finals to Glebe Swifts and Oxford United, Rangers claimed their first Irish Junior Cup in 1999 when they beat Lisburn Rangers in Loughgall. The following year the club reached the Final again but were defeated by Lisnaskea Rovers at Ferney Park, Ballinamallard.

The club reached the Final in 2017, the first to be held at the National Stadium at Windsor Park and defeated Hill Street. The club defeated Greenisland in the 2018 Final, retaining the trophy for the first time in the club's history.

In 2018/19, the club won the Irish Junior Cup for a third time in a row, defeating Fermanagh and Western side Tummery Athletic at Ferney Park, Ballinamallard and the following year lost on penalties to Willowbank at Shamrock Park, Portadown.

In 2023/24, Rangers beat Cleary Celtic 2-0 to win the Irish Junior Cup for the fifth time.

== Notable players ==
- Sandy Fulton
- Jim Cleary
- Joe Keenan
- Nigel Birney
- Adrian Hopkins
- Dessie Donegan
- Michael Kerr

== External Sources ==
- Fermanagh & Western Football League
- Northern Ireland Junior Football
