= Enniskillen Town United F.C. =

Association football club in Northern Ireland

Enniskillen Town United Football Club are a football club from Northern Ireland, located in Enniskillen, County Fermanagh who play in the Fermanagh & Western 1st Division. Most notable players of the current first team squad are Cathal Beacom and Gary Beckett.

Enniskillen Town United have won the coveted Irish Junior Cup twice in their 40-year history, once in 1994 and again in 2007. Captain Rory Judge scored the winning goal in both finals. Former players include: Kieran Mckenna formerly of Tottenham Hotspur and Michael McGovern of Norwich City F.C. Enniskillen Town United are currently sponsored by Blakes of the hollow bar, and the current season's kits are supplied by Nike.

The club currently play their home games at The Lakeland Forum playing fields, located in Enniskillen. It is hoped that in the very near future, Enniskillen Town United F.C will attain their own playing fields which will help the club to develop further. Land close to the Kilmacormick estate in Enniskillen has been ear-marked for this development but talks are still on-going between the club and the council.

== Honours ==
=== Junior honours ===
- Irish Junior Cup: 2
  - 1993–94, 2006–07
