= Fermanagh & Western FA =

Association football body in Northern Ireland

The Fermanagh & Western Football Association is one of four regional FAs within Northern Ireland and affiliated to the Irish FA, the others being the County Antrim FA (also known as the North East Ulster FA), the Mid-Ulster FA and the North-West FA.

== History ==
The Fermanagh & Western FA was founded in 1907 following the expansion of the Fermanagh & South Tyrone FA (itself founded in 1904). Although its responsibilities are now bound by the borders of Northern Ireland, initially the F&W FA ran football as far south as Sligo, Clones and Cavan.

== Competitions ==
The three primary competitions organised by the Fermanagh & Western FA are the Fermanagh & Western Intermediate Cup, the Mercer League and the Mulhern Cup.

=== Mercer Cup Division One ===
Incomplete list of winners

| Season | Winners | Runners-up | Notes |
|---|---|---|---|
| 1904/05 | St Michael's Hall Celtic | Enniskillen Corinthians | |
| 1905/06 | St Michael's Hall Celtic | | |
| 1906/07 | Sligo Athletic | | |
| 1907/08 | St Michael's Hall Celtic | | |
| 1908/09 | St Michael's Hall Celtic | | |
| 1909/10 | St Michael's Hall Celtic | | |
| 1910/11 | Clones Celtic | | |
| 1911/12 | Royal Irish Fusiliers (Cavan) | | |
| 1912/13 | Irvinestown Wanderers | | |
1913/14
1914/15
1915/16
1916/17
1917/18
1918/19
| 1919/20 | Omagh Wanderers | Enniskillen Corinthians | |
| 1920/21 | Enniskillen Corinthians | | |
| 1921/22 | Omagh Wanderers | | |
| 1922/23 | Enniskillen Corinthians | | |
| 1923/24 | No. 1 Area Fermanagh Constabulary (Kesh) | | |
| 1924/25 | Melvin United | | |
| 1925/26 | Ballinamallard | Enniskillen Corinthians | Play-Off. Ballinamallard won 4-3 |
| 1926/27 | Enniskillen Corinthians | | |
| 1927/28 | Enniskillen Corinthians | | |
| 1928/29 | Enniskillen Corinthians | Enniskillen Celtic | Play-Off |
| 1929/30 | Royal Inniskilling & Royal Irish Fusiliers | Enniskillen GNR | |
| 1930/31 | Enniskillen GNR | | |
| 1931/32 | Omagh United | Omagh Depot | |
| 1932/33 | Omagh Depot | | |
| 1933/34 | Omagh Depot | | |
| 1934/35 | Enniskillen Corinthians | Enniskillen Celtic | |
| 1935/36 | Enniskillen Corinthians | Enniskillen Celtic | Play-Off |
| 1936/37 | Omagh Depot | Enniskillen Corinthians | |
1937/38
| 1938/39 | RUC Depot | Omagh United | |
| 1939/40 | RUC Depot | Enniskillen Corinthians | |
| 1940/41 | 8th Foresters | | |
| 1941/42 | Enniskillen Corinthians | | |
| 1942/43 | RAF | | |
| 1943/44 | RAF Killadeas | | |
| 1944/45 | RAF Killadeas | | |
| 1945/46 | RAF | | |
1946/47
| 1947/48 | ITC (Omagh) | Aston Villa (Omagh) | |
1948/49
1949/50
| 1950/51 | Fivemiletown United | | |
| 1951/52 | Fivemiletown United | Enniskillen Corinthians | |
| 1952/53 | Enniskillen Corinthians | Fivemiletown | |
| 1953/54 | Enniskillen Corinthians | | |
| 1954/55 | Enniskillen Rangers | Enniskillen Corinthians | |
| 1955/56 | Enniskillen Corinthians | Enniskillen Rangers | |
| 1956/57 | Enniskillen Rangers | Enniskillen Corinthians | Play-Off |
| 1957/58 | Ballinamallard | Enniskillen Rangers | |
| 1958/59 | Enniskillen Rangers | Enniskillen Corinthians | |
| 1959/60 | Brookborough | Enniskillen Corinthians | |
| 1960/61 | Brookborough | | |
| 1961/62 | Enniskillen Rangers | | |
| 1962/63 | Enniskillen Rangers | Lisbellaw | |
| 1963/64 | Enniskillen Rangers | Enniskillen Corinthians | |
| 1964/65 | Enniskillen Rangers | Enniskillen Corinthians | |
| 1965/66 | Enniskillen Rangers | Omagh Celtic | |
| 1966/67 | Omagh Celtic | Lisnarick | |
| 1967/68 | Lisbellaw United | Enniskillen Rangers | |
| 1968/69 | Lisbellaw United | Enniskillen Rangers | |
| 1969/70 | Enniskillen Corinthians | | |
| 1970/71 | Enniskillen Corinthians | Maguiresbridge | |
| 1971/72 | Mourneview Celtic | Enniskillen Rangers | |
| 1972/73 | Enniskillen Rangers | Irvinestown Wanderers | |
| 1973/74 | Kevlin United | Enniskillen Rangers | |
| 1974/75 | Kevlin United | Enniskillen Rangers | |
| 1975/76 | Lisbellaw United | Dunbreen Rovers | |
| 1976/77 | Enniskillen Rangers | Lisnarick | |
| 1977/78 | Lisbellaw United | Dunbreen Rovers | |
| 1978/79 | Lisbellaw United | Shelbourne | |
| 1979/80 | Lisbellaw United | Irvinestown Wanderers | |
| 1980/81 | Lisbellaw United | Irvinestown Wanderers | |
| 1981/82 | Enniskillen Rangers | Lisbellaw United | |
| 1982/83 | Shelbourne | Enniskillen Rangers | |
| 1983/84 | Shelbourne | Enniskillen Rangers | |
| 1984/85 | Shelbourne | Enniskillen Rangers | |
| 1985/86 | Victoria Bridge United | Irvinestown Wanderers | |
| 1986/87 | Irvinestown Wanderers | Ballinamallard United | |
| 1987/88 | Enniskillen Rangers | Irvinestown Wanderers | |
| 1988/89 | Irvinestown Wanderers | Enniskillen Rangers | |
| 1989/90 | Enniskillen Rangers | Omagh Town Reserves | |
| 1990/91 | Enniskillen Rangers | Enniskillen Town United | |
| 1991/92 | Enniskillen Rangers | Shelbourne | Play-Off |
| 1992/93 | Shelbourne | Enniskillen Town United | |
| 1993/94 | Dergview | Enniskillen Rangers | |
| 1994/95 | Shelbourne | Ballinamallard Utd Reserves | |
| 1995/96 | Dergview | Ballinamallard Utd Reserves | After play off series with Enniskillen Town United |
| 1996/97 | Dergview | Ballinamallard Utd Reserves | |
| 1997/98 | Ballinamallard Utd Reserves | Lisnaskea Rovers | |
| 1998/99 | Enniskillen Rangers | Killen Rangers | |
| 1999/00 | Dergview | Irvinestown Wanderers | |
| 2000/01 | Not completed | | Abandoned due to foot-and-mouth crisis |
| 2001/02 | Ballinamallard Utd Reserves | NFC Kesh / Enniskillen R | |
| 2002/03 | Shelbourne | Killen Rangers | Play-Off |
| 2003/04 | Lisnaskea Rovers | Kevlin United | |
| 2004/05 | Enniskillen Town United | Irvinestown Wanderers | |
| 2005/06 | Enniskillen Town United | Clabby Strollers | |
| 2006/07 | Enniskillen Town United | NFC Kesh | |
| 2007/08 | Enniskillen Town United | Lisbellaw United | |
| 2008/09 | Enniskillen Town United | | |
| 2009/10 | Lisbellaw United | | |
| 2010/11 | Lisbellaw United | | |
| 2011/12 | Lisbellaw United | | |
| 2012/13 | Enniskillen Town United | | |
| 2013/14 | Strathroy Harps FC | | |
| 2014/15 | Strathroy Harps FC | | |
| 2015/16 | Lisbellaw United | | |

=== Mulhern Cup Finals ===
Incomplete list of winners

| Season | Winners | | | Runners-up | Notes |
|---|---|---|---|---|---|
| 1908 | St Michael's Hall Celtic | | | | |
| 1909 | Sligo St Mary's | 3 | 2 | Enniskillen Celtic | |
| 1910- 1921 | No Records | | | | |
| 1922 | 1st Lincolnshire Regiment | | | | |
| 1923 | 12th Star FC | | | | |
| 1924 | Enniskillen Corinthians | 3 | 1 | No. 1 Area Fermanagh Constabulary | |
| 1925 | Melvin United | 5 | 3 | Derrylin | |
| 1926 | Ennislillen Corinthians | 3 | 0 | Sherwood Foresters | Replay |
| 1927 | Shamrock Rovers | 4 | 0 | Lisnaskea RUC | |
| 1928 | Enniskillen Corinthians | 3 | 0 | Lisbellaw | |
| 1929 | Omagh Depot | 4 | 2 | Enniskillen Celtic | |
| 1930 | Fermanagh RUC | 2 | 1 | Enniskillen GNR | |
| 1931 | Enniskillen GNR | 2 | 0 | Omagh Depot | |
| 1932 | Enniskillen GNR | 3 | 2 | After extra-time | Omagh Depot |
| 1933 | Fivemiletown | 1 | 2 | Enniskillen GNR | Cup and medals awarded to Fivemiletown following protest |
| 1934 | Enniskillen Celtic | 2 | 1 | Omagh Depot | Replay, After extra-time. Game 1: 3-3 |
| 1935 | Enniskillen Corinthians | 3 | 2 | Omagh Depot | Replay, After extra-time. Game 1: 3-3 |
| 1936 | Omagh Depot | 4 | 2 | Enniskillen Corinthians | |
| 1937 | RUC Depot | 2 | 0 | Fivemiletown | |
| 1938 | Enniskillen Corinthians | 2 | 0 | Fivemiletown | |
| 1939 | RUC Depot | 3 | 2 | Enniskillen Corinthians | |
| 1940 | Enniskillen United | 5 | 1 | Enniskillen Corinthians | |
| 1941 | Fivemiletown | 2 | 0 | Army XI | |
| 1942 | 2nd Buckinghamshire Regiment | | | | |
| 1943 | RAF Killadeas 'A' | 2 | 0 | Enniskillen Corinthians | |
| 1945 | RAF Killadeas | 5 | 3 | 5th Staffords 'B' | |
| 1946 | Enniskillen Corinthians | 4 | 3 | RAF Castle Archdale | |
| 1947 | Rock Rovers | 4 | 2 | RAF Castle Archdale | |
| 1948 | RAF Castle Archdale | 3 | 1 | Fivemiletown | |
| 1949 | RAF Castle Archdale | 3 | 1 | Enniskillen Celtic | |
| 1950 | RAF Castle Archdale | 3 | 1 | Ballinamallard | |
| 1951 | Fivemiletown | 3 | 0 | RAF Castle Archdale | |
| 1952 | Fivemiletown | 3 | 1 | Ballinamallard | |
| 1953 | Fivemiletown | 1 | 0 | Enniskillen Corinthians | |
| 1954 | Enniskillen Corinthians | 0 | 0 | Taylor Woods | Replay, After extra-time. Game 1: 2-2 Cup shared |
| 1955 | Ballinamallard | 3 | 0 | Fivemiletown | |
| 1956 | Enniskillen Rangers | 4 | 3 | Enniskillen Corinthians | |
| 1957 | Enniskillen Rangers | 2 | 1 | Enniskillen Corinthians | |
| 1958 | Enniskillen Rangers | 3 | 2 | Enniskillen Corinthians | |
| 1959 | Enniskillen Rangers | 4 | 2 | Enniskillen Corinthians | |
| 1960 | Ely Res | 2 | 2 | Enniskillen Corinthians | Replay, After extra-time. Game 1: 3-3 Cup shared |
| 1961 | Brookeborough | 4 | 1 | Enniskillen Corinthians | |
| 1962 | Enniskillen Rangers | 3 | 0 | Enniskillen Corinthians | |
| 1963 | Omagh Caxtonians | 2 | 1 | Brookeborough | |
| 1964 | Enniskillen Rangers | 3 | 1 | Omagh Celtic | |
| 1965 | Enniskillen Rangers | 4 | 0 | Brookeborough | |
| 1966 | Omagh Celtic | 2 | 0 | Omagh United | |
| 1967 | Omagh Celtic | 1 | 0 | Mourneview Celtic | |
| 1968 | Dunbreen Rovers | 1 | 0 | Lisbellaw United | Replay. Game 1: 1-1. |
| 1969 | Lisbellaw United | 3 | 1 | Enniskillen Corinthians | Replay. Game 1: 2-2. |
| 1970 | Omagh Town Swifts | 3 | 2 | Victoria Bridge | |
| 1971 | Enniskillen Corinthians | 2 | 1 | Killymore Rovers | |
| 1989 | Ballinamallard United | 2 | 1 | Enniskillen Rangers | |
| 2011 | Ballinamallard United Reserves | 0 | 0 | Tummery Athletic | After extra time. Ballinamallard won on penalties. |

== Internationals ==
Three currently active Northern Ireland international footballers began their careers in Fermanagh & Western football: Roy Carroll, Ivan Sproule and Kyle Lafferty.
