= List of soccer players with 50 or more A-League Men goals =

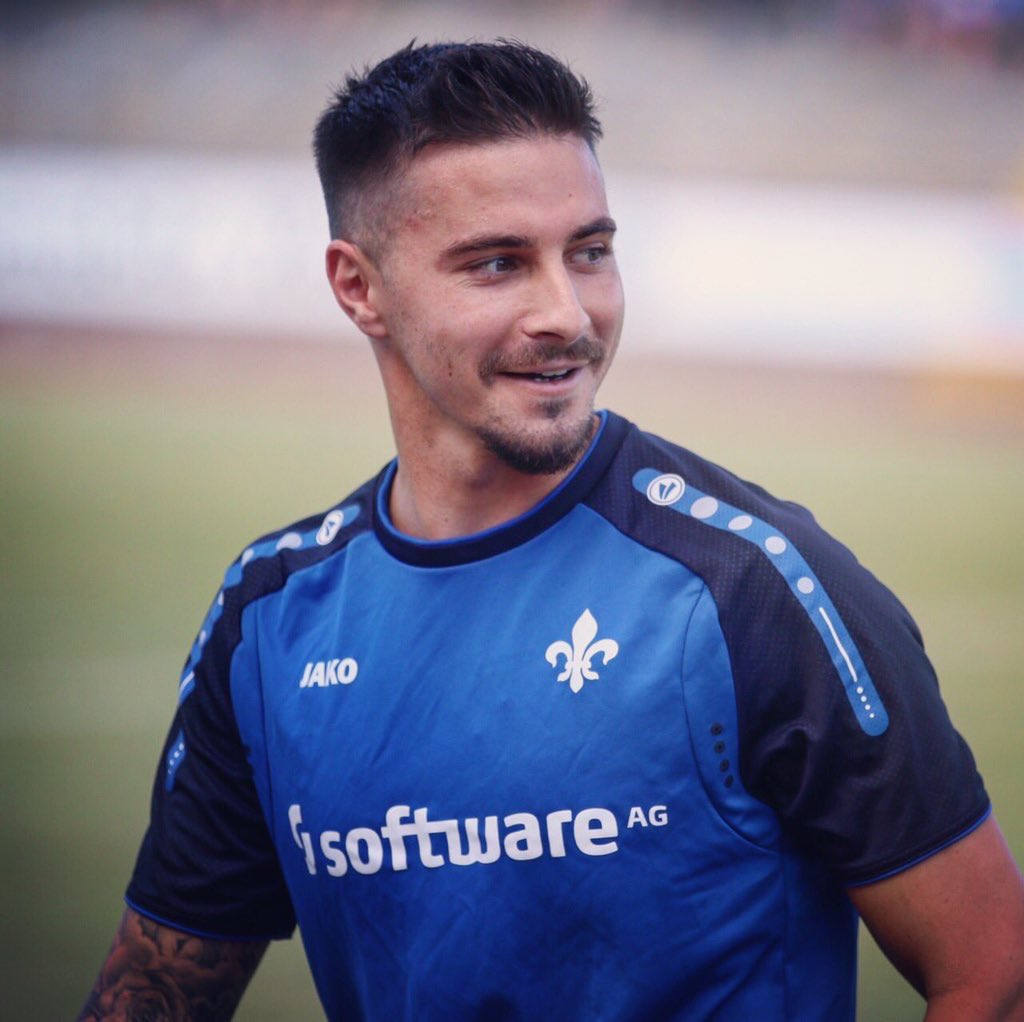
Jamie Maclaren is the highest scorer in the competition's history, with 148 goals.

Since the A-League Men's formation, at the start of the 2005–06 season, a total of 17 players have scored 50 or more goals in the competition. During the 2010–11 season, Archie Thompson became the first player to score 50 goals. In the 2016–17 season, Besart Berisha became the first player to score 100 goals in the competition. Bruno Fornaroli is the fastest player to reach the milestone, having done so in 76 games.

== Players ==
Key

- **Bold** shows players still playing in the A-League Men.
- Italics show players still playing professional soccer in other leagues.

As of 20 January 2025

List of soccer players with 50 or more A-League Men goals
Rank	Player	Goals	Apps	Ratio	First	Last	Club(s) (goals/apps)
1	(Australia) Jamie Maclaren	148	233	0.66	2013	2024	Melbourne City (103/142), Brisbane Roar (40/53), Perth Glory (11/38)
2	(Kosovo) Besart Berisha	142	236	0.60	2011	2021	Melbourne Victory (68/110), Brisbane Roar (48/76), Western United (26/50)
3	(Australia) Bruno Fornaroli	109	197	0.55	2015	2025	Melbourne City (48/70), Perth Glory (34/72), Melbourne Victory (27/55)
4	(New Zealand) **Kosta Barbarouses**	100	337	0.30	2007	2025	Melbourne Victory (41/127), Wellington Phoenix (29/111), Sydney FC (18/66), Brisbane Roar (12/33), **Western Sydney Wanderers** (0/0)
5	(New Zealand) Shane Smeltz	92	190	0.48	2007	2017	Perth Glory (28/58), Gold Coast United (28/38), Wellington Phoenix (24/51), Sydney FC (12/43)
6	(Australia) Archie Thompson	90	224	0.40	2005	2016	Melbourne Victory
7	(Australia) **Adam Taggart**	80	161	0.50	2011	2025	**Perth Glory** (51/99), Newcastle Jets (18/44), Brisbane Roar (11/18)
8	(Australia) Alex Brosque	75	243	0.31	2005	2019	Sydney FC (67/222), Queensland Roar (8/21)
9	(Australia) Matt Simon	66	288	0.24	2007	2021	Central Coast Mariners (61/221), Sydney FC (5/67)
10	(Australia) Mark Bridge	63	251	0.25	2005	2019	Western Sydney Wanderers (33/121), Sydney FC (17/80), Newcastle Jets (13)
11	(England) Adam Le Fondre	62	106	0.58	2018	2023	Sydney FC
12	(Brazil) Bobô	59	100	0.59	2016	2022	Sydney FC
12	(Republic of Ireland) Andy Keogh	59	156	0.38	2014	2022	Perth Glory
14	(Australia) **Craig Goodwin**	58	205	0.28	2012	2023	**Adelaide United** (53/157), Newcastle Jets (5/44), Melbourne Heart (0/4)
15	(Republic of Ireland) Roy O'Donovan	56	128	0.44	2015	2021	Newcastle Jets (31/71), Central Coast Mariners (19/45), Brisbane Roar (6/12)
16	(Fiji) Roy Krishna	51	122	0.42	2014	2019	Wellington Phoenix
16	(Australia) **David Williams**	51	228	0.22	2006	2025	Queensland Roar (0/2), North Queensland Fury (8/49), Melbourne City (21/101), Wellington Phoenix (11/27), **Perth Glory** (11/49)
18	(Netherlands) Sergio van Dijk (Note: A-League career occurred before he was naturalized to Indonesian in February 2013.)	50	105	0.48	2008	2012	Adelaide United (25/55), Brisbane Roar (25/50)

== See also ==
- List of soccer players in Australia by number of league goals
- List of A-League players
- A-League Golden Boot
