= List of soccer players with 200 or more A-League Men appearances =

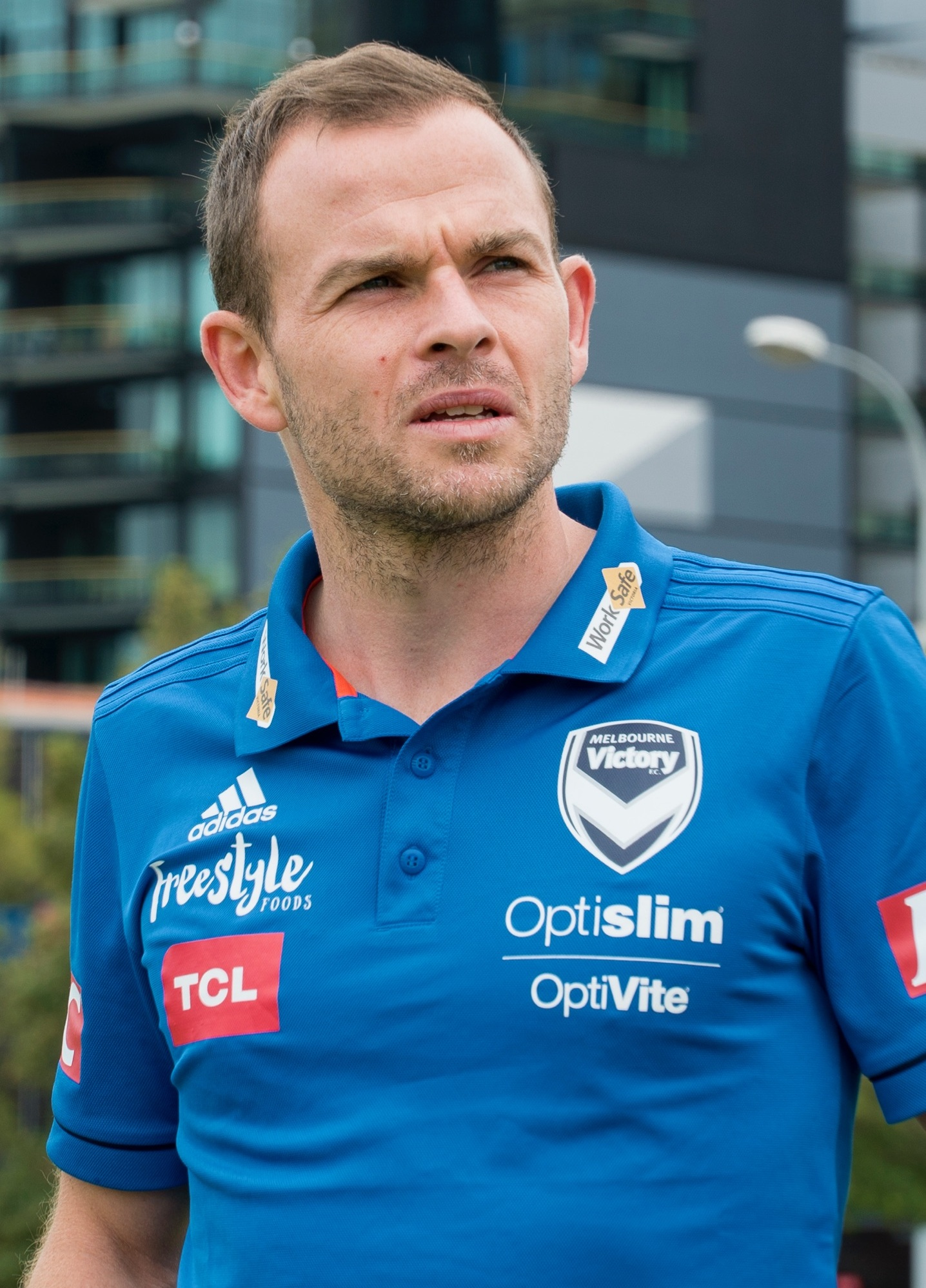
Leigh Broxham has the most A-League Men appearances.

There are lists of A-League Men players who have made the most appearances in the A-League Men, the top level of the Australian soccer league system.

Since the A-League Men's formation at the start of the 2005–06, four players have accrued 300 appearances in the A-League Men. The first player to reach the milestone was defender Andrew Durante, in representation of Newcastle Jets and Wellington Phoenix; his 300th match was Wellington's 3–2 win over Central Coast Mariners on 12 January 2019.

Leigh Broxham (Melbourne Victory) is the only player to have achieved to accoldate of 300+ A-League Men appearances exclusively for the club. Liam Reddy played for seven A-League Men clubs (the most for this achievement) on their way to 300+ A-League Men games. The only players from outside Oceania to play 200+ A-League Men games are Maltese defender Manny Muscat and Kosovan striker Besart Berisha.

== List of players ==
Players are initially listed by number of appearances. If number of appearances are equal, the players are then listed chronologically by the year of first appearance. Current A-League Men players and their current clubs are shown in bold.

Statistics updated as of end of 2025–26 season.

A-League Men players with at least 200 appearances
Rank	Player	Nat.	Pos	Apps	First	Last	Club(s)
1	Leigh Broxham	(Australia)	MF	386	2007	2024	Melbourne Victory (386)
2	Nikolai Topor-Stanley	(Australia)	DF	380	2006	2023	Newcastle Jets (189), Western Sydney Wanderers (104), Perth Glory (37), Western United (36), Sydney FC (14)
3	**Kosta Barbarouses**	(New Zealand)	FW	372	2007	2026	Melbourne Victory (127), Wellington Phoenix (111), Sydney FC (66), Brisbane Roar (33), **Western Sydney Wanderers** (xx)
4	Alex Wilkinson	(Australia)	DF	365	2005	2023	Sydney FC (183), Central Coast Mariners (172), Melbourne City (10)
5	Andrew Durante	(New Zealand)	DF	358	2006	2021	Wellington Phoenix (273), Western United (45), Newcastle Jets (40)
6	Liam Reddy	(Australia)	GK	350	2005	2023	Perth Glory (154), Brisbane Roar (66), Central Coast Mariners (52), Sydney FC (37), Newcastle Jets (23), Wellington Phoenix (12), Western Sydney Wanderers (6)
7	**Rhyan Grant**	(Australia)	DF	346	2008	2026	**Sydney FC** (305)
8	Danny Vukovic	(Australia)	GK	337	2005	2024	Central Coast Mariners (163), Perth Glory (106), Sydney FC (28), Melbourne Victory (23), Wellington Phoenix (17)
9	**Luke Brattan**	(Australia)	MF	327	2009	2025	Sydney FC (108), Brisbane Roar (91), Melbourne City (79), **Macarthur FC** (14)
10	Scott Jamieson	(Australia)	DF	322	2008	2023	Melbourne City (140), Perth Glory (56), Adelaide United (49), Sydney FC (48), Western Sydney Wanderers (29)
11	**Anthony Caceres**	(Australia)	MF	304	2013	2025	Sydney FC (165), Central Coast Mariners (62), Melbourne City (43), **Macarthur FC** (xx)
12	**Jack Hingert**	(Sri Lanka)	DF	303	2009	2025	**Brisbane Roar** (xx), North Queensland Fury (27)
13	**Andrew Redmayne**	(Australia)	GK	302	2008	2025	**Sydney FC** (191), Melbourne City (48), Western Sydney Wanderers (31), Central Coast Mariners (3), Brisbane Roar (2)
14	Jason Hoffman	(Australia)	DF	300	2007	2024	Newcastle Jets (220), Melbourne City (80)
14	**Scott Neville**	(Australia)	DF	299	2008	2025	Perth Glory (104), **Brisbane Roar** (100), Western Sydney Wanderers (51), Newcastle Jets (44)
16	**Storm Roux**	(New Zealand)	DF	294	2013	2025	**Central Coast Mariners** (186), Melbourne Victory (72), Perth Glory (1)
17	Josh Risdon	(Australia)	DF	289	2010	2026	**Perth Glory** (152), Western United (90), Western Sydney Wanderers (28)
18	Eugene Galekovic	(Australia)	GK	288	2005	2019	Adelaide United (238), Melbourne City (35), Melbourne Victory (15)
18	Tarek Elrich	(Australia)	DF	288	2005	2020	Newcastle Jets (134), Adelaide United (101), Western Sydney Wanderers (43), Perth Glory (10)
18	Matt Simon	(Australia)	FW	288	2007	2021	Central Coast Mariners (221), Sydney FC (67)
21	**Joshua Brillante**	(Australia)	MF	283	2010	2025	Sydney FC (79), Melbourne Victory (50), Newcastle Jets (46), **Western Sydney Wanderers** (30), Melbourne City (28), Gold Coast United (14)
22	Nigel Boogaard	(Australia)	DF	275	2006	2021	Newcastle Jets (122), Adelaide United (98), Central Coast Mariners (55)
23	Matt McKay	(Australia)	MF	272	2005	2019	Brisbane Roar (272)
24	Steven Ugarkovic	(Australia)	MF	233	2016	2025	Newcastle Jets (135), Western Sydney Wanderers (40), **Melbourne City** (32), Wellington Phoenix (27)
25	Vince Lia	(Australia)	MF	259	2005	2020	Wellington Phoenix (197), Adelaide United (34), Melbourne Victory (24), Perth Glory (4)
26	**Jack Clisby**	(Australia)	DF	257	2013	2025	**Western Sydney Wanderers** (77), Central Coast Mariners (71), Perth Glory (70), Melbourne City (31)
27	**Isaías**	(Spain)	MF	255	2013	2025	**Adelaide United** (243)
28	Mark Bridge	(Australia)	FW	251	2005	2019	Western Sydney Wanderers (121), Sydney FC (80), Newcastle Jets (50)
29	Glen Moss	(New Zealand)	GK	250	2005	2020	Wellington Phoenix (140), Newcastle Jets (46), Gold Coast United (41), Melbourne Victory (14), New Zealand Knights (9)
30	**Ryan Kitto**	(Australia)	DF	249	2013	2025	**Adelaide United** (197), Newcastle Jets (18)
31	**Adama Traoré**	(Ivory Coast)	DF	247	2009	2025	**Melbourne Victory** (117), Gold Coast United (69), Western Sydney Wanderers (50)
32	Alex Brosque	(Australia)	FW	243	2005	2019	Sydney FC (222), Queensland Roar (21)
33	Ivan Franjic	(Australia)	DF	242	2009	2021	Brisbane Roar (131), Perth Glory (53), Melbourne City (39), Macarthur FC (19)
34	**Matthew Jurman**	(Australia)	DF	215	2007	2026	Sydney FC (96), Newcastle Jets (42), Brisbane Roar (34), Western Sydney Wanderers (24), **Macarthur FC** (20)
35	Besart Berisha	(Kosovo)	FW	236	2011	2021	Melbourne Victory (110), Brisbane Roar (76), Western United (50)
36	Jamie Maclaren	(Australia)	FW	233	2013	2023	Melbourne City (142), Brisbane Roar (53), Perth Glory (38)
36	Michael McGlinchey	(New Zealand)	MF	233	2009	2020	Central Coast Mariners (148), Wellington Phoenix (85)
38	Connor Pain	(Australia)	MF	231	2013	2023	Western United (105), Central Coast Mariners (73), Melbourne Victory (53)
39	Michael Marrone	(Australia)	DF	230	2009	2021	Adelaide United (160), Melbourne Heart (70)
39	Michael Theo	(Australia)	GK	230	2005	2017	Brisbane Roar (159), Melbourne Victory (71)
39	**Paulo Retre**	(Australia)	MF	230	2013	2025	Sydney FC (139), Melbourne City (54), **Wellington Phoenix** (9)
42	Manny Muscat	(Malta)	DF	229	2008	2018	Wellington Phoenix (192), Melbourne City (37)
43	John Hutchinson	(Malta)	MF	228	2005	2015	Central Coast Mariners (228)
43	**David Williams**	(Australia)	FW	228	2006	2025	Melbourne City (101), North Queensland Fury (49), **Perth Glory** (49), Wellington Phoenix (27), Brisbane Roar (2)
43	**Jamie Young**	(England)	GK	228	2014	2025	Brisbane Roar (144), Western United (56), **Melbourne City** (28)
46	**Ben Garuccio**	(Australia)	MF	227	xx	2026	**Sydney FC** (xx)
47	Mitch Nichols	(Australia)	MF	226	2007	2019	Brisbane Roar (125), Western Sydney Wanderers (53), Perth Glory (27), Melbourne Victory (14), Wellington Phoenix (7)
47	Dimitri Petratos	(Australia)	FW	226	2010	2022	Brisbane Roar (94), Newcastle Jets (79), Sydney FC (30), Western Sydney Wanderers (23)
49	**Scott Galloway**	(Australia)	DF	225	2013	2025	Melbourne City (92), Melbourne Victory (54), Adelaide United (29), Central Coast Mariners (24), Wellington Phoenix (22), **Auckland FC** (4)
50	Archie Thompson	(Australia)	DF	224	2005	2016	Melbourne Victory (224)
51	Craig Goodwin	(Australia)	FW	223	2012	2026	Adelaide United (xx), Newcastle Jets (44), Melbourne Heart (4)
52	Matt Thompson	(Australia)	DF	221	2005	2014	Newcastle Jets (121), Melbourne Heart (82), Sydney FC (18)
53	Josh Rose	(Australia)	DF	218	2005	2018	Central Coast Mariners (183), Melbourne City (23), New Zealand Knights (12)
54	Miloš Ninković	(Serbia)	MF	216	2015	2024	Sydney FC (181), Western Sydney Wanderers (35)
55	Rostyn Griffiths	(Australia)	MF	214	2009	2018	Melbourne City (82), Perth Glory (59), Central Coast Mariners (48), North Queensland Fury (23), Adelaide United (2)
55	Jade North	(Australia)	DF	214	2005	2018	Brisbane Roar (115), Newcastle Jets (80), Wellington Phoenix (19)
55	Bruno Fornaroli	(Australia)	FW	214	XX	2025	Melbourne Victory (XX), Perth Glory (xx), Melbourne City (xx)
58	**Lawrence Thomas**	(Australia)	GK	213	xx	2026	Western Sydney Wanderers (xx)
58	**James Donachie**	(Australia)	DF	213	xx	2026	Central Coast Mariners (xx)
60	**Andrew Nabbout**	(Australia)	FW	211	xx	2026	Melbourne City (xx)
61	Osama Malik	(Australia)	DF	209	2009	2022	Adelaide United (95), Melbourne City (57), Perth Glory (34), North Queensland Fury (23)
62	**Ben Halloran**	(Australia)	MF	208	xx	2026	Brisbane Roar (xx)
63	Massimo Murdocca	(Australia)	MF	206	2005	2015	Brisbane Roar (162), Melbourne City (44)
64	Michael Thwaite	(Australia)	DF	204	2008	2018	Perth Glory (85), Gold Coast United (82), Western Sydney Wanderers (21), Melbourne Victory (16)
65	Nick Fitzgerald	(Australia)	MF	202	2010	2022	Central Coast Mariners (71), Melbourne City (63), Brisbane Roar (23), Newcastle Jets (20), Perth Glory (13), Western Sydney Wanderers (12)
65	Jason Geria	(Australia)	DF	202	2013	2025	Melbourne Victory (189), Perth Glory (13)
65	**Jake Brimmer**	(Australia)	MF	202	XX	2026	Auckland FC (xx)
Minimum 200 appearances

== Most appearances by club ==
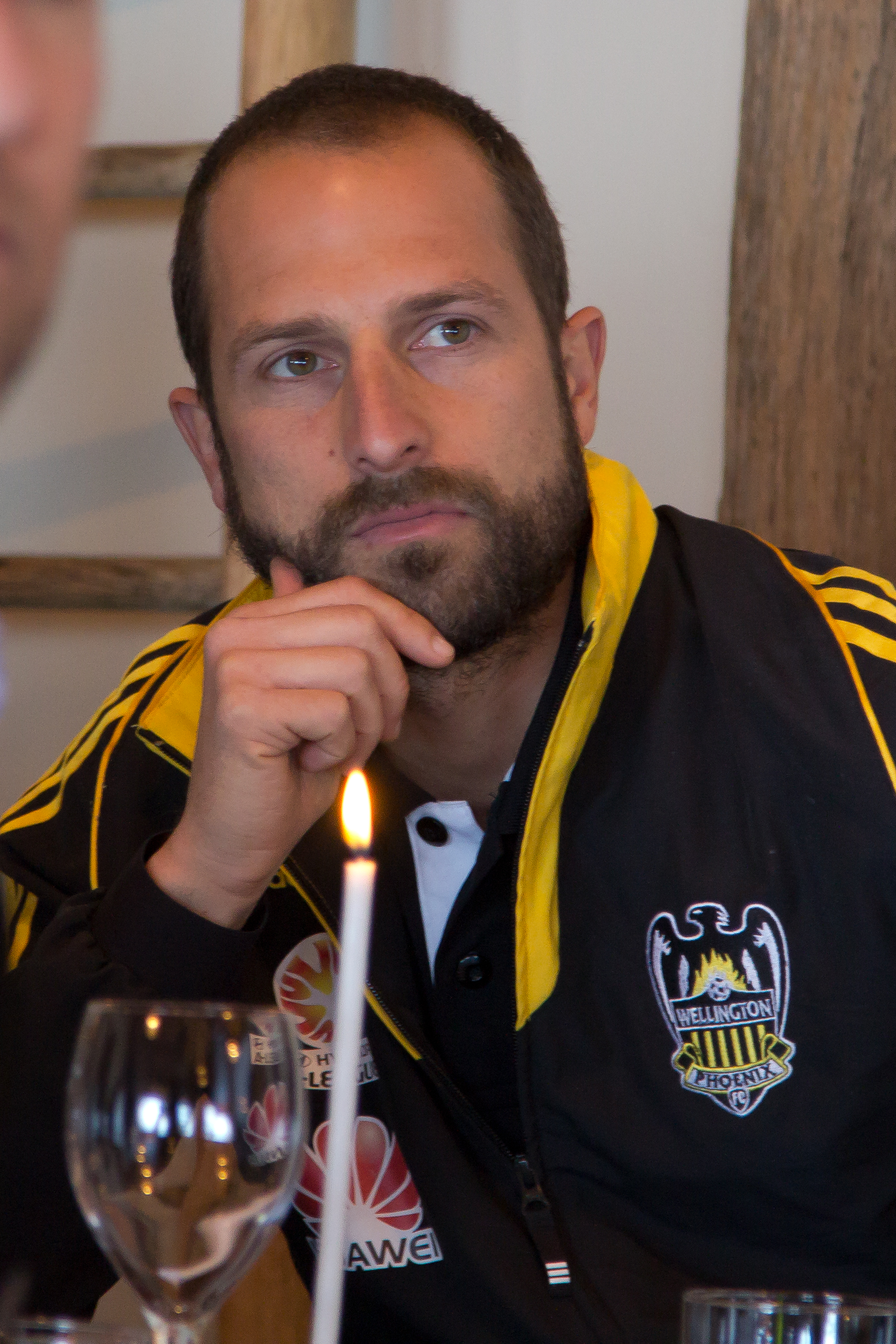
Andrew Durante is third in terms of most appearances in A-League Men club.

Current A-League Men clubs and players are shown in bold; defunct clubs are in italics.

As of 20 January 2025

Rank	Club	Player	Nat.	Apps	First	Last
1	**Melbourne Victory**	Leigh Broxham	(Australia)	386	2005	2024
2	**Sydney FC**	**Rhyan Grant**	(Australia)	305	2008	2025
3	**Wellington Phoenix**	Andrew Durante	(New Zealand)	273	2008	2019
4	**Brisbane Roar**	Matt McKay	(Australia)	272	2005	2019
6	**Adelaide United**	**Isaías Sánchez**	(Spain)	243	2013	2025
6	**Central Coast Mariners**	John Hutchinson	(Malta)	228	2005	2015
7	**Newcastle Jets**	Jason Hoffman	(Australia)	220	2007	2024
8	**Melbourne City**	Curtis Good	(Australia)	158	2011	2024
9	**Perth Glory**	Andy Keogh	(Republic of Ireland)	156	2014	2022
10	**Western Sydney Wanderers**	Mark Bridge	(Australia)	121	2012	2019
11	Western United	Tomoki Imai	(Japan)	120	2020	2025
12	**Macarthur FC**	**Filip Kurto**	(Poland)	89	2022	2025
13	Gold Coast United	Michael Thwaite	(Australia)	82	2009	2012
14	North Queensland Fury	David Williams	(Australia)	49	2009	2011
15	New Zealand Knights	Darren Bazeley	(England)	41	2005	2007

== See also ==
- List of soccer players in Australia by number of league appearances (300+)
- List of soccer players with 50 or more A-League Men goals
