= 2005–06 Melbourne Victory FC season =

Melbourne Victory
2005–06 season
- Manager: Ernie Merrick
- A-League: 7th
- Pre-Season Challenge Cup: Semi-final
- Top goalscorer: Archie Thompson (8)
- Highest home attendance: 18,260 vs Sydney FC (16 October 2005)
- Lowest home attendance: 10,078 vs New Zealand Knights (4 February 2006)
- Average home league attendance: 14,158

Melbourne Victory were considered to be one of the future "powerhouse" football clubs in Australia prior to the 2005/06 A-League season, with Socceroos Kevin Muscat and Archie Thompson returning to Melbourne from successful club careers in Europe. It was widely believed that they would be contenders for the A-League championship. However, the team ended up finishing a disappointing seventh and missed out on the finals.

== Players ==
=== First-team squad ===
Note: Flags indicate national team as defined under FIFA eligibility rules; some limited exceptions apply. Players may hold more than one non-FIFA nationality.

No.	Pos.	Nation	Player
1	GK	AUS	Michael Theoklitos
2	MF	AUS	Kevin Muscat (captain)
3	DF	AUS	Daniel Piorkowski
4	DF	AUS	Mark Byrnes
5	DF	BEL	Geoffrey Claeys
6	DF	AUS	Steve Pantelidis
7	FW	AUS	Michael Ferrante
8	MF	AUS	Andy Vlahos
9	FW	AUS	Daniel Allsopp
10	FW	AUS	Archie Thompson

No.	Pos.	Nation	Player
11	MF	AUS	Vince Lia
12	MF	AUS	Carl Recchia
13	MF	AUS	Kristian Sarkies
15	DF	AUS	Adrian Leijer
16	DF	AUS	Simon Storey
17	MF	AUT	Richard Kitzbichler
18	MF	AUS	Chris Tadrosse
19	FW	AUS	Ricky Diaco
20	GK	AUS	Eugene Galeković

=== Transfers ===
In

Player	From	Country/State & League From	Date
(Australia) Michael Theoklitos	Bulleen Zebras	(Australia) VPL	
(Australia) Kevin Muscat	Millwall	(England) English Championship	
(Australia) Daniel Piorkowski	Melbourne Knights	(Australia) VPL	
(Australia) Mark Byrnes	FC Hameenlinna	(Finland) Finnish First Division	
(Belgium) Geoffrey Claeys	Excelsior Mouscron	(Belgium) Jupiler League	
(Australia) Steve Pantelidis	Heidelberg United FC	(Australia) VPL	
(Australia) Michael Ferrante	Fawkner Blues	(Australia) VPL	
(Australia) Andy Vlahos	Cercle Brugge	(Belgium) Jupiler League	
(Australia) Danny Allsopp	Hull City	(England) English Championship	
(Australia) Archie Thompson	Lierse SK	(Belgium) Jupiler League	
(Australia) Vince Lia	Fawkner Blues	(Australia) VPL	
(Australia) Carl Recchia	South Melbourne FC	(Australia) VPL	
(Australia) Kristian Sarkies	South Melbourne FC	(Australia) VPL	
(Australia) Adrian Leijer	Melbourne Knights	(Australia) VPL	
(Australia) Simon Storey	Altona Magic	(Australia) VPL	
(Austria) Richard Kitzbichler	Austria Wien	(Austria) Austrian Bundesliga	
(Australia) Chris Tadrosse	Blacktown City FC	(Australia) NSW Premier League	
(Australia) Ricky Diaco	Bulleen Zebras	(Australia) VPL	
(Australia) Eugene Galekovic	SC Beira-Mar	(Portugal) Primeira Liga	

== Matches ==
=== 2005-06 Hyundai A-League fixtures ===
28 August 2005 Round 1	Sydney FC	1 : 1	Melbourne Victory	Sydney Football Stadium, Sydney
17:00 UTC+10	Yorke 44'	Report	Thompson 73'	Attendance: 25,208; Referee: Mark Shield

4 September 2005 Round 2	Melbourne Victory	2 : 2	Perth Glory	Olympic Park Stadium, Melbourne
17:00 UTC+10	Kitzbichler 11'; Muscat 85' (pen)	Report	Caceres 40'; Despotovski 56'	Attendance: 17,960; Referee: Matthew Breeze

9 September 2005 Round 3	Adelaide United	1 : 0	Melbourne Victory	Hindmarsh Stadium, Adelaide
19:30 UTC+9:30	Brain 1'; Alagich (red card) 15'			Attendance: 8,785; Referee: Peter O'Leary

18 September 2005 Round 4	Queensland Roar	1 : 1	Melbourne Victory	Suncorp Stadium, Brisbane
15:00 UTC+10	Baird 62'; McKay (red card) 40'		Allsopp 88'	Attendance: 15,444; Referee: Ben Williams

25 September 2005 Round 5	Melbourne Victory	1 : 0	Newcastle Jets	Olympic Park Stadium, Melbourne
17:00 UTC+10	Thompson 68'			Attendance: 13,831; Referee: Craig Zetter

30 September 2005 Round 6	Central Coast Mariners	1 : 2	Melbourne Victory	Bluetongue Central Coast Stadium, Gosford
20:00 UTC+10	Heffernan 33'		Thompson 73'; Leijer 81'	Attendance: 9,313; Referee: Ben Williams

10 October 2005 Round 7	Melbourne Victory	3 : 0	New Zealand Knights	Olympic Park Stadium, Melbourne
19:00 UTC+10	Kitzbichler 23'; Muscat 62'; Diaco 64'			Attendance: 11,010; Referee: Peter Green

16 October 2005 Round 8	Melbourne Victory	5 : 0	Sydney FC	Olympic Park Stadium, Melbourne
13:00 UTC+10	Kitzbichler 34'; Muscat 53' 78'; Thompson 57' 69'		Talay (red card) 58'	Attendance: 18,206; Referee: Matthew Breeze

23 October 2005 Round 9	Perth Glory	2 : 1	Melbourne Victory	Members Equity Stadium, Perth
17:00 UTC+8	Deane 22'; Sekulovski 55'		Thompson 39'	Attendance: 12,312; Referee: Mark Shield

28 October 2005 Round 10	Melbourne Victory	0 : 1	Adelaide United	Olympic Park Stadium, Melbourne
20:00 UTC+10			Veart 83'	Attendance: 16,201; Referee: Matthew Breeze

4 November 2005 Round 11	Melbourne Victory	0 : 1	Queensland Roar	Olympic Park Stadium, Melbourne
20:00 UTC+11			Matt McKay 15'	Attendance: 13,239; Referee: Mark Shield

11 November 2005 Round 12	Melbourne Victory	0 : 0	Newcastle Jets	Olympic Park Stadium, Melbourne
20:00 UTC+11				Attendance: 12,407; Referee: Simon Przydacz

18 November 2005 Round 13	Melbourne Victory	0 : 2	Central Coast Mariners	Olympic Park Stadium, Melbourne
20:00 UTC+11			Hutchinson 38'; Heffernan 75'	Attendance: 13,892; Referee: Ben Williams

28 November 2005 Round 14	New Zealand Knights	2 : 3	Melbourne Victory	North Harbour Stadium, Auckland
20:00 UTC+11	Christie 31'; Devine 41' (pen)		Muscat 41' (pen); Kitzbichler 44'; Kitzbichler 75'	Attendance: 1,922; Referee: Peter O'Leary

3 December 2005 Round 15	Sydney FC	2 : 1	Melbourne Victory	Sydney Football Stadium, Sydney
19:00 UTC+11	Corica 24'; Carney 81'		Allsopp 88'	Attendance: 17,272; Referee: Mark Shield

29 December 2005 Round 16	Melbourne Victory	2 : 2	Perth Glory	Olympic Park Stadium, Melbourne
20:00 UTC+11	Thompson 23'; Allsopp 45'		Mori 24'; Ward 67'	Attendance: 14,754; Referee: Peter O'Leary

5 January 2006 Round 17	Adelaide United	1 : 0	Melbourne Victory	Hindmarsh Stadium, Adelaide
20:00 UTC+11	Dodd 14'			Attendance: 13,427; Referee: Mark Shield

15 January 2006 Round 18	Queensland Roar	0 : 1	Melbourne Victory	Suncorp Stadium, Brisbane
19:00 UTC+11			Thompson 55'	Attendance: 12,710; Referee: Mark Shield

21 January 2006 Round 19	Newcastle Jets	1 : 0	Melbourne Victory	EnergyAustralia Stadium, Newcastle
17:00 UTC+11	Coveny 36'			Attendance: 9,073; Referee: Matthew Breeze

27 January 2006 Round 20	Central Coast Mariners	3 : 1	Melbourne Victory	Bluetongue Central Coast Stadium, Gosford
20:00 UTC+11	Spencer 28'; Spencer 63'; Heffernan 88'		Michael Ferrante 13'	Attendance: 11,925; Referee: Simon Przydacz

3 February 2006 Round 21	Melbourne Victory	2 : 1	New Zealand Knights	Olympic Park Stadium, Melbourne
17:00 UTC+11	Byrnes 2'; Muscat 21' (pen)		Brockie 90'	Attendance: 10,078; Referee: Angelo Nadi

== Ladder ==
Pos	Team	Pld	W	D	L	GF	GA	GD	Pts	Qualification
1	Adelaide United	21	13	4	4	33	25	+8	43	Qualification for 2007 AFC Champions League group stage and Finals series
2	Sydney FC (C)	21	10	6	5	35	28	+7	36	Qualification for 2007 AFC Champions League group stage and Finals series
3	Central Coast Mariners	21	8	8	5	35	28	+7	32	Qualification for Finals series
4	Newcastle Jets	21	9	4	8	27	29	−2	31	Qualification for Finals series
5	Perth Glory	21	8	5	8	34	29	+5	29	
6	Queensland Roar	21	7	7	7	27	22	+5	28	
7	Melbourne Victory	21	7	5	9	26	24	+2	26	
8	New Zealand Knights (Note: New Zealand Knights cannot qualify for the AFC Champions League as they are not recognised as an AFC club.)	21	1	3	17	15	47	−32	6	

Source: ultimatealeague.com
Rules for classification: 1) points; 2) goal difference; 3) number of goals scored.
(C) Champions

== 2005–06 end-of-season awards ==
- Player of the Year (Victory Medal)
  - Kevin Muscat
- Clubman of the Year
  - Adrian Leijer
- Players' Player of the Year
  - Adrian Leijer
- Golden Boot
  - Archie Thompson
- Union Supporters Fans' Player of the Year
  - Richard Kitzbichler
