= 2006–07 Melbourne Victory FC season =

Melbourne Victory
2006–07 season
- Manager: Ernie Merrick
- A-League: 1st
- Pre-Season Challenge Cup: 5th
- Top goalscorer: Archie Thompson (15)
- Highest home attendance: 56,636 vs Adelaide United (18 February 2007)
- Lowest home attendance: 15,563 vs New Zealand Knights (17 December 2006)
- Average home league attendance: 27,928

The Melbourne Victory A-League 2006–07 season was their most successful A-League season. They defeated Adelaide United 6–0 in their first Grand Final, winning the Championship, Premiership and qualifying for the AFC Champions League 2008.

== Season summary ==
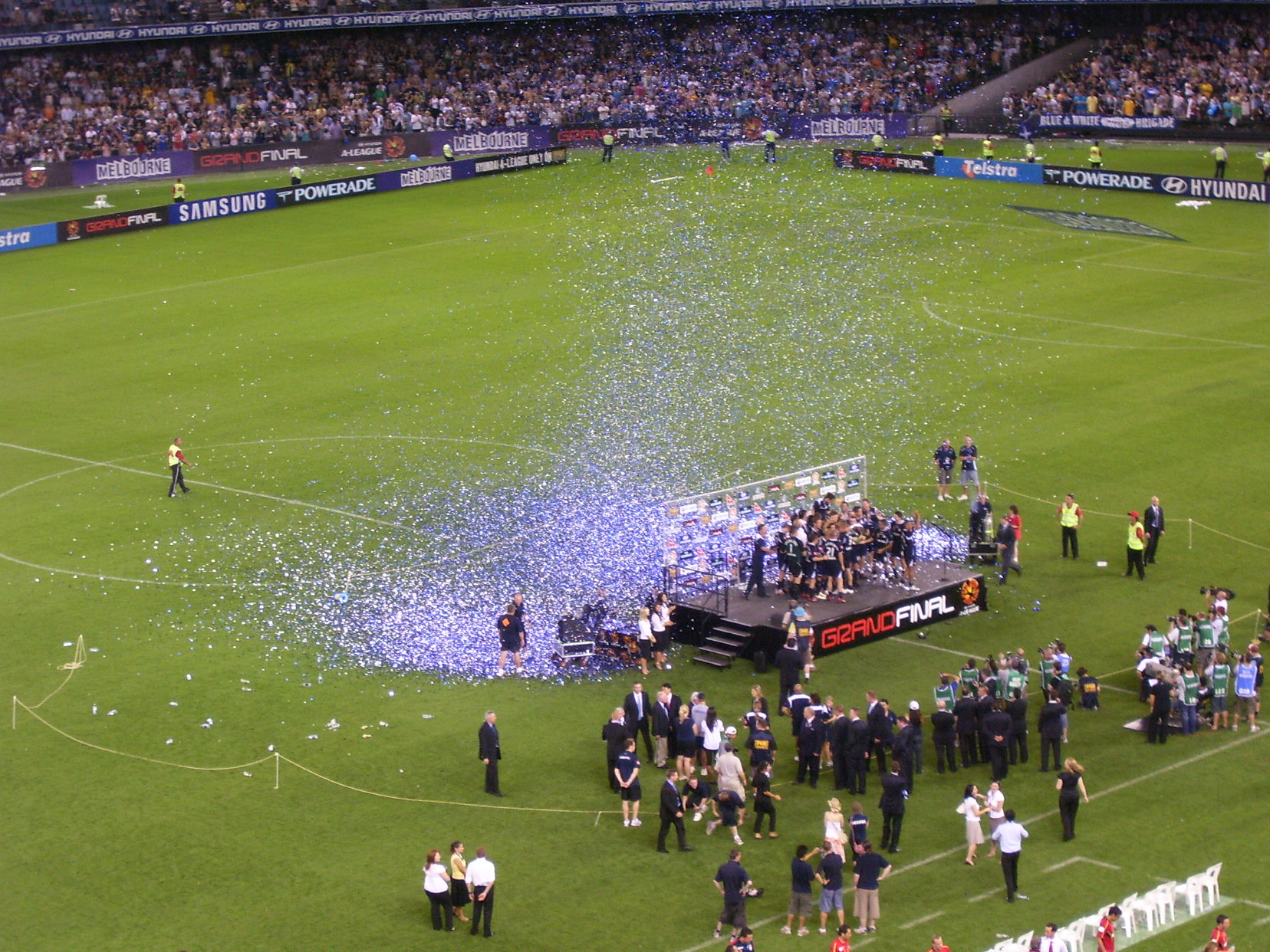
Melbourne Victory celebrating their A-League Grand Final victory.

Melbourne began the 2006–07 Hyundai A-League season hoping to vastly improve on their 7th place in the inaugural season. Coach Ernie Merrick had made a number of off-season signings to bolster the squad with skill and experience including 3 Brazilians Alessandro, Claudinho, Fred along with Scottish Premier League player Grant Brebner. After a hugely successful Round 2 fixture against Sydney FC at the Telstra Dome (now the Etihad Stadium) in front of a crowd of 39,730, Melbourne Victory announced that they would move all but one match from Olympic Park to Telstra Dome. Melbourne became the first team to complete the A-League double in the history of the competition; clinching the premiership against the New Zealand Knights 4–0 at Olympic Park with 4 rounds of the A-League season remaining, then beating Adelaide United 6–0 in the Grand Final at a sold out Telstra Dome to take the championship. Melbourne also qualified for the 2008 AFC Champions League as A-League Champions.

== Players ==
=== First team squad ===
Note: Flags indicate national team as defined under FIFA eligibility rules; some limited exceptions apply. Players may hold more than one non-FIFA nationality.

No.	Pos.	Nation	Player
1	GK	AUS	Michael Theoklitos
2	MF	AUS	Kevin Muscat (captain)
3	DF	AUS	Daniel Piorkowski
4	DF	AUS	Mark Byrnes
5	DF	BEL	Geoffrey Claeys
6	DF	AUS	Steve Pantelidis
7	FW	AUS	Michael Ferrante
8	MF	BRA	Fred
9	FW	AUS	Daniel Allsopp
10	FW	AUS	Archie Thompson
11	MF	AUS	Vince Lia
12	DF	AUS	Rodrigo Vargas

No.	Pos.	Nation	Player
13	MF	AUS	Kristian Sarkies
14	MF	AUS	Adrian Caceres
15	DF	AUS	Adrian Leijer
16	DF	AUS	Simon Storey
17	MF	SCO	Grant Brebner
18	MF	BRA	Alessandro
19	FW	BRA	Claudinho
20	GK	AUS	Eugene Galeković
21	FW	ENG	James Robinson
22	MF	AUS	Leigh Broxham
23	MF	AUS	Antun Kovacic
30	GK	AUS	Peter Gavalas

=== Transfers ===
In

Player	From	Country/State & League From	Date
(Australia) Adrian Caceres	Perth Glory	(Australia) A-League	13 February 2006
(Brazil) Alessandro	Sport Club Internacional	Brazil Serie A	July 2006
(Brazil) Claudinho	Atlético Paranaense	Brazil Serie A	24 May 2006
(Brazil) Fred	Guarani	Brazil Serie B	24 May 2006
(Australia) Rodrigo Vargas	Green Gully Cavaliers	VPL	July 2006
(Scotland) Grant Brebner	Dundee United	(Scotland) Scottish Premier League	July 2006
(England) James Robinson	Richmond SC	VPL	23 November 2006

Out

Player	To	Country/State & League From	Date
(Australia) Chris Tadrosse	Released (KFC Uerdingen)	(Germany) Oberliga Nordrhein	24 January 2006
(Austria) Richard Kitzbichler	Released (Red Bull Salzburg)	(Austria) Austrian Bundesliga	31 January 2006
(Australia) Ricky Diaco	Released (Bulleen Zebras)	VPL	15 February 2006
(Australia) Carl Recchia	Released (Fawkner-Whittlesea Blues) (Club Disabanded)	VPL	15 February 2006
(Australia) Andy Vlahos	Released (Heidelberg United)	VPL	-
(Belgium) Geoffrey Claeys	Melbourne Victory retired	(Australia) A-League	21 November 2006
(Brazil) Claudinho	Released		17 December 2006

== Matches ==
=== Pre-season friendlies ===
Melbourne started their 2006-07 pre-season with a number of practise matches against Victorian Premier League clubs. These included a laboured 1–0 win over Richmond SC, a 2–2 draw against Bulleen Zebras, a 4–0 victory against Green Gully, a 7–0 victory of Kingston City FC and 3-0 victories over Altona Magic and Oakleigh Cannons.

Victory also won the QNI North Queensland Trophy by beating leading Chinese Super League team Changchun Yatai 6–1 in the final. Michael Ferrante scored twice early on and then-trialist Grant Brebner added a spectacular thirty-yard free-kick to make it 3–0 at half-time, while Danny Allsopp scored three times in the second half to seal the win. The competition featured fellow A-League side Central Coast Mariners (Victory won 4–2 on penalties), the Young Socceroos (Victory lost 5–6 on penalties), and Changchun Yatai (Victory won 3–1 in the first meeting).

Melbourne kicked off their A-League Pre-Season Cup campaign with a disappointing 1–0 loss to Adelaide United at Launceston's Aurora Stadium in front of 6,834 spectators. The second match saw them play out a 1–1 draw away to Perth Glory, with Daniel Allsopp scoring Melbourne's only goal. Back at Olympic Park for the final group match, they were soundly beaten 3-1 by the Central Coast Mariners, ending the club's hopes of progressing to the next round of the competition. A "bonus round" match finished off the group stage, with the Melbourne defeating Newcastle Jets 3–2.

In the first match of a rather meaningless playoff section involving the lower placed teams of the group stage, Victory defeated the Queensland Roar 4–2 on penalties, having been locked at 0-0 after 120 minutes of play. The match was held at Epping Stadium in the outer north of Melbourne. The final match of the pre-season cup saw the Victory defeat Perth Glory 1–0 at Olympic Park in front of 2,215 loyal fans, and finish the competition in 5th place.

=== 2006-07 Hyundai A-League fixtures ===
25 August 2006 Round 1	Melbourne Victory	2 : 0	Adelaide United	Olympic Park Stadium, Melbourne, Melbourne
20:00 UTC+10	Muscat 29' (pen.); Claudinho 78'			Attendance: 15,781; Referee: Matthew Breeze

2 September 2006 Round 2	Melbourne Victory	3 : 2	Sydney FC	Telstra Dome, Melbourne
19:00 UTC+10	Allsopp 8'; Muscat 11' (pen.); Allsopp 51'		Fyfe 18'; Vargas 83' (o.g.); Rudan (red card) 13'	Attendance: 39,730; Referee: Mark Shield

9 September 2006 Round 3	New Zealand Knights	0 : 3	Melbourne Victory	North Harbour Stadium, Auckland
19:30 UTC+9:30			Allsopp 9'; Thompson 22'; Muscat 35'	Attendance: 2,107; Referee: Matthew Breeze

17 September 2006 Round 4	Melbourne Victory	1 : 0	Central Coast Mariners	Olympic Park Stadium, Melbourne
15:00 UTC+10	Thompson 51'			Attendance: 17,617; Referee: Angelo Nardi

24 September 2006 Round 5	Perth Glory	1 : 2	Melbourne Victory	Members Equity Stadium, Perth
17:00 UTC+10	Tarka 90'		Caceres 55'; Muscat 72' (pen.)	Attendance: 7,983; Referee: Peter Green

1 October 2006 Round 6	Melbourne Victory	4 : 1	Queensland Roar	Telstra Dome, Melbourne
20:00 UTC+10	Fred 11'; Muscat 22' (pen.); Muscat 57' (pen.); Allsopp 82'		Milicic 16'	Attendance: 25,921; Referee: Simon Przydacz

8 October 2006 Round 7	Newcastle Jets	0 : 2	Melbourne Victory	EnergyAustralia Stadium, Newcastle
19:00 UTC+10			Allsopp 69'; Allsopp 89'	Attendance: 4,635; Referee: Peter Green

14 October 2006 Round 8	Melbourne Victory	0 : 1	Adelaide United	Telstra Dome, Melbourne
13:00 UTC+10			Owens 83'	Attendance: 32,368; Referee: Matthew Breeze

21 October 2006 Round 9	Sydney FC	1 : 2	Melbourne Victory	Sydney Football Stadium, Sydney
20:00UTC+10	Corica 8'		Thompson 50'; Thompson 73'	Attendance: 20,881; Referee: Mark Shield

27 October 2006 Round 10	New Zealand Knights	0 : 4	Melbourne Victory	North Harbour Stadium, Auckland
20:00 UTC+10			Fred 5'; Thompson 57'; Caceres 59'; Allsopp 72'; Caceres (red card) 87'	Attendance: 2,357; Referee: Simon Przydacz

3 November 2006 Round 11	Melbourne Victory	3 : 3	Central Coast Mariners	Telstra Dome, Melbourne
19:00 UTC+11	Allsopp 5'; Thompson 11'; Allsopp 86'; Vargas (red card) 23'; Muscat (red card) 45'		McMaster 7'; Petrie 12'; Kwasnik 23' (pen.)	Attendance: 28,118; Referee: Peter Green

9 November 2006 Round 12	Melbourne Victory	1 : 0	Perth Glory	Telstra Dome, Melbourne
20:00 UTC+11	Brebner 89'			Attendance: 22,890; Referee: Craig Zetter

17 November 2006 Round 13	Queensland Roar	0 : 2	Melbourne Victory	Suncorp Stadium, Brisbane
19:00 UTC+11			Parker 18' (o.g.); Thompson 47'	Attendance: 14,797; Referee: Simon Przydacz

25 November 2006 Round 14	Melbourne Victory	0 : 1	Newcastle Jets	Telstra Dome, Melbourne
17:00 UTC+11			Rodriguez 61'	Attendance: 27,753; Referee: Matthew Breeze

1 December 2006 Round 15	Adelaide United	1 : 3	Melbourne Victory	Hindmarsh Stadium, Adelaide
19:00 UTC+11	Fernando 43'; Bajic (red card) 13'		Muscat 16' (pen.); Allsopp 62'; Fred 86'; Brebner (red card) 21'	Attendance: 16,378; Referee: Mark Shield

8 December 2006 Round 16	Melbourne Victory	0 : 0	Sydney FC	Telstra Dome, Melbourne
20:00 UTC+11				Attendance: 50,333; Referee: Mark Shield

17 December 2006 Round 17	Melbourne Victory	4 : 0	New Zealand Knights	Olympic Park Stadium, Melbourne
20:00 UTC+11	Allsopp 34'; Caceres 39'; Allsopp 44'; Thompson 45'			Attendance: 15,563; Referee: Angelo Nardi

30 December 2006 Round 18	Central Coast Mariners	1 : 2	Melbourne Victory	Suncorp Stadium, Brisbane
17:00 UTC+11	Kwasnik 53'		Fred 23'; Thompson 27'	Attendance: 15,404; Referee: Simon Przydacz

7 January 2007 Round 19	Perth Glory	2 : 2	Melbourne Victory	Members Equity Stadium, Perth
17:00 UTC+11	Harnwell 29'; Byrnes 43' (o.g.)		Sarkies 59'; Sarkies 76'; Ferrante (red card) 75'	Attendance: 6,462; Referee: Peter Green

12 January 2007 Round 20	Melbourne Victory	1 : 2	Queensland Roar	Telstra Dome, Melbourne
20:00 UTC+11	Thompson 80'		Mori 18'; Vidosic 90'	Attendance: 28,937; Referee: Mark Shield

19 January 2007 Round 21	Newcastle Jets	4 : 0	Melbourne Victory	EnergyAustralia Stadium, Newcastle
17:00 UTC+11	Bridge 36'; Bridge 48'; Coveny 51'; Griffiths 73'			Attendance: 19,601; Referee: Matthew Breeze

== 2006–07 Finals series ==
27 January 2007 Major Semi Final Leg 1	Adelaide United	0 : 0	Melbourne Victory	Hindmarsh Stadium, Adelaide
16:30 UTC+11				Attendance: 15,575; Referee: Simon Przydacz

4 February 2007 Major Semi Final Leg 2	Melbourne Victory	2 : 1	Adelaide United	Telstra Dome, Melbourne
17:00 UTC+11	Allsopp 48'; Robinson 90'		Dodd 4'	Attendance: 47,413; Referee: Mark Shield

18 February 2007 Grand Final	Melbourne Victory	6 : 0	Adelaide United	Telstra Dome, Melbourne
16:00 UTC+11	Thompson 21', 29', 40', 56', 73'; Sarkies 90'		Aloisi (red card) 34'	Attendance: 55,436; Referee: Mark Shield

== Ladder ==
Pos	Team	Pld	W	D	L	GF	GA	GD	Pts	Qualification
1	Melbourne Victory (C)	21	14	3	4	41	20	+21	45	Qualification for 2008 AFC Champions League group stage and Finals series
2	Adelaide United	21	10	3	8	32	27	+5	33	Qualification for 2008 AFC Champions League group stage and Finals series
3	Newcastle Jets	21	8	6	7	32	30	+2	30	Qualification for Finals series
4	Sydney FC	21	8	8	5	29	19	+10	29 (Note: Sydney FC were penalised three competition points following round 18 due to salary cap breaches which occurred during the 2005–06 season)	Qualification for Finals series
5	Queensland Roar	21	8	5	8	25	27	−2	29	
6	Central Coast Mariners	21	6	6	9	22	26	−4	24	
7	Perth Glory	21	5	5	11	24	30	−6	20	
8	New Zealand Knights (Note: New Zealand Knights cannot qualify for the AFC Champions League as they are not recognised as an AFC club.)	21	5	4	12	13	39	−26	19	Disbanded at end of season

Source: ultimatealeague.com
Rules for classification: 1) points; 2) goal difference; 3) number of goals scored.
(C) Champions

== 2006–07 awards ==
- Victory Medal
  - Kevin Muscat and Danny Allsopp
- Players' Player of the Year
  - Danny Allsopp
- Clubman of the Year
  - Fred
- Golden Boot
  - Archie Thompson
