= Adrian Leijer =

Australian soccer player

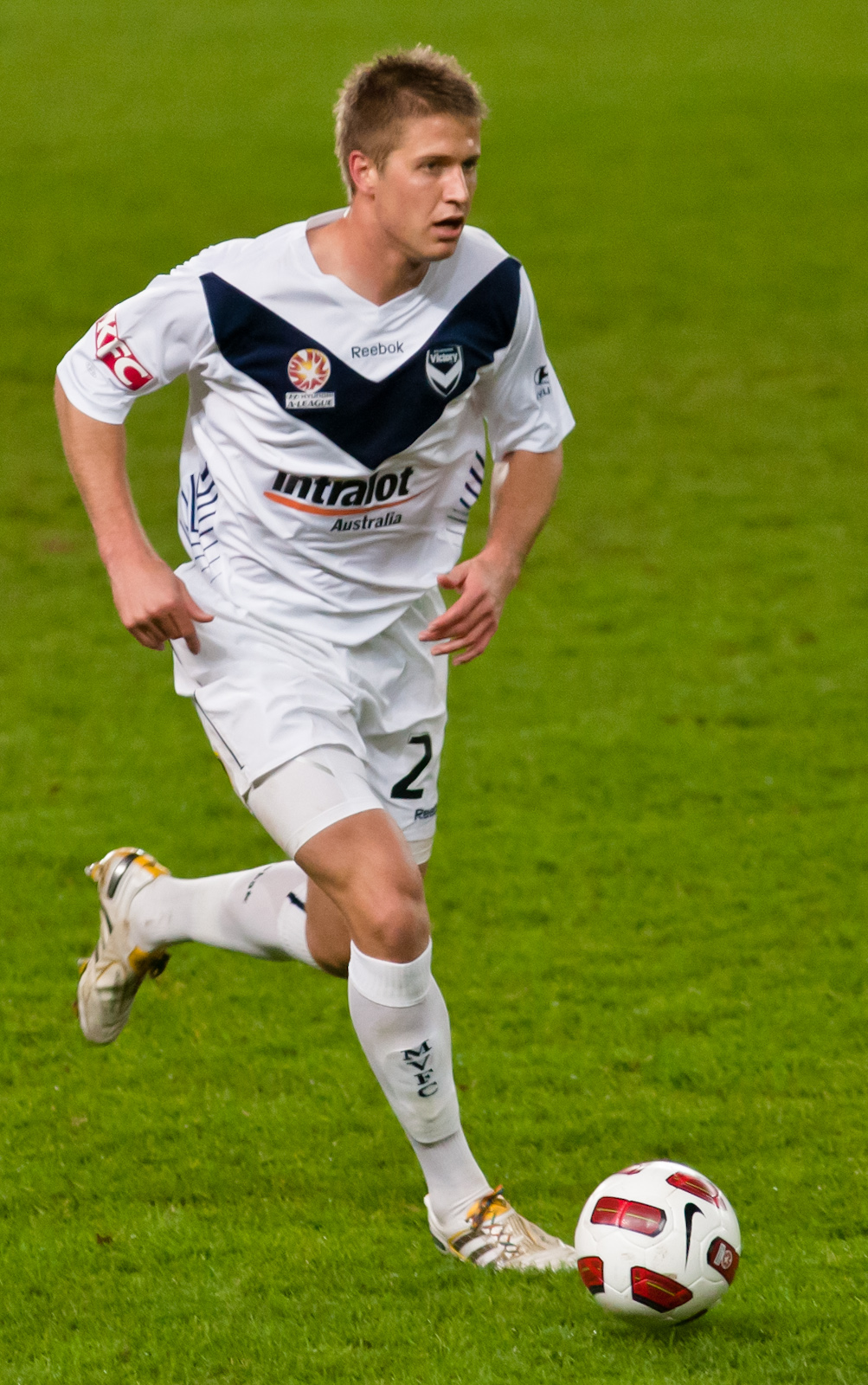
- Leijer playing for Melbourne Victory in 2010

Personal information
- Date of birth: 25 March 1986 (age 40)
- Place of birth: Dubbo, Australia
- Height: 1.86 m (6 ft 1 in)
- Position: Centre-back

Youth career
- 2001: Geelong SC
- 2002–2003: VIS

Senior career*
Years	Team	Apps	(Gls)
2003–2004	Melbourne Knights	20	(0)
2005–2007	Melbourne Victory	38	(1)
2007–2009	Fulham	0	(0)
2009	→ Norwich City (loan)	4	(0)
2009–2015	Melbourne Victory	135	(6)
2015	Chongqing Lifan	24	(1)
2016–2018	Suwon FC	66	(3)
2019–2020	Dandenong City	15	(1)
Total		302	(12)

International career
2003	Australia U-17	11	(0)
2004–2005	Australia U-20	10	(1)
2006–2008	Australia U-23	23	(1)
2008	Australia	1	(0)
- * Club domestic league appearances and goals

Adrian Leijer (born 25 March 1986) is an Australian former professional soccer player who played as a centre-back.

Leijer played on one occasion for Australia and made over 100 appearances for Melbourne Victory in the A-League.

== Club career ==
=== Early years ===
Leijer was born, and largely grew up in, the New South Wales town of Dubbo to a family of Dutch and English heritage. He played from Under 10 - Under 14 with SASS Strikers Junior Soccer Club in the Dubbo & District Soccer Association. Whilst with SASS, he represented Western New South Wales and New South Wales Country in football. In 1998, Leijer was a co-captain of Orana Heights Public School in Dubbo.

When Leijer was 15 years old his family moved south to Jan Juc on Victoria's surf coast and attended Belmont High School where he joined Geelong SC and represented the U-15's Victorian Country team. Ian Greener, then Head of Coaching & Development at the Victorian Soccer Federation, spotted his talent and recommended him to the head coach of the Victorian Institute of Sport Football program, Ernie Merrick.

Leijer spent two years at the Victorian Institute of Sport and then moved on to the Melbourne Knights for the last season of the now defunct National Soccer League, where he made 18 appearances during a season where the club finished second last in the competition.

While still training at the VIS, Leijer and his future teammate Kristian Sarkies were selected to trial with Premier League Everton Football Club for three weeks. However, they both failed to impress and returned home to Australia.

=== Melbourne Victory ===
Upon his return to Australia, he was signed by Melbourne Victory, a team in the new A-League competition. His former VIS coach Ernie Merrick, who had taken the reins at Melbourne Victory, stated; "Adrian is a reliable and uncompromising defender with a football maturity beyond his years. He is already part of the senior leadership group within the club and is the second youngest player in the squad,"

The club's first season was reminiscent of Leijer's time at the Melbourne Knights as Melbourne Victory finished second last overall. Leijer, however, played 20 games for the club, only missing their final game against the New Zealand Knights through suspension. At the end of the season he was awarded the Players' Player of the Year and Clubman of the Year awards.

Melbourne Victory's second season was more successful, starting with seven straight wins and culminating in a 6–0 victory over Adelaide United in the Grand Final. At the A-League's end of season awards, Leijer won Young Player of the Year.

=== Fulham ===
On 2 August 2007, Melbourne Victory confirmed that English Premier League club Fulham had made a bid for the then 21-year-old. Leijer accepted and signed a three-year contract for an undisclosed fee.

Leijer consistently played for the Fulham reserve team throughout the 2007–08 season and was also included in the squads to face both Liverpool and Reading, but stayed on the bench both times. Following Adrian's return to Fulham after an unsuccessful Olympic campaign with the Australian U/23's team, Leijer returned without having played any games in the Olympic tournament. Whilst tipped by Fulham reserve coach Billy McKinlay to make a greater impact in the first team that season, Adrian missed most of the club's pre-season due to the Olympic tournament and only made the bench once, in a League Cup defeat to Burnley.

=== Norwich ===
On 2 February 2009, it was announced that Leijer has moved on loan to Norwich City until the end of the 2008–09 season, becoming Norwich City's 40th loan signing since they were relegated in their 2004–05 season. This loan spell was mostly unsuccessful for Leijer, since it did not result in him seeing a great deal of first team action.

=== Melbourne Victory ===
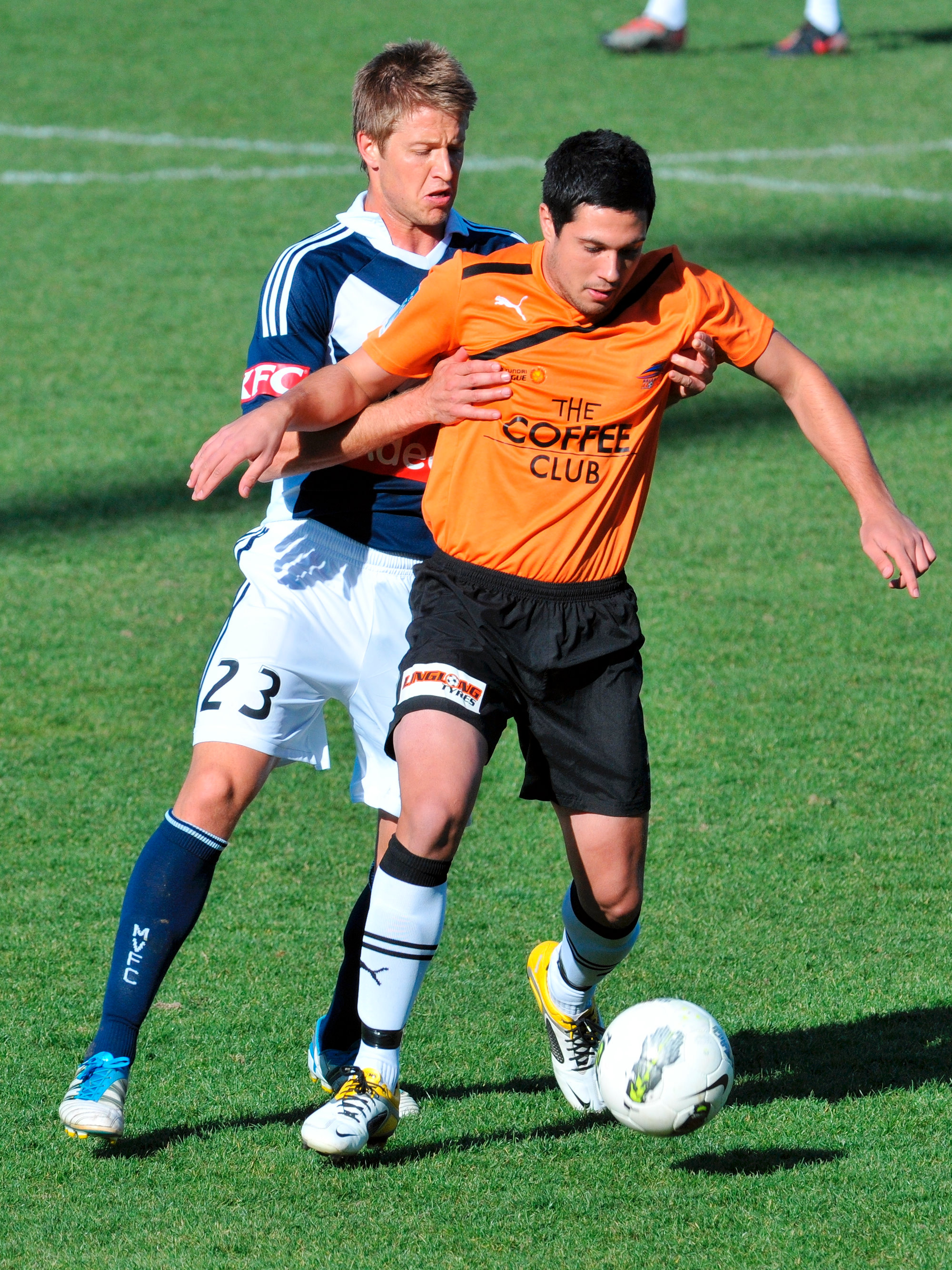
Leijer playing for Melbourne Victory against Brisbane Roar in 2011.

It was announced that Leijer would return again to Australia during their 2009–10 season, after being re-signed by his former Melbourne Victory for three years. Melbourne had suffered shallow defensive stocks with numerous key players unavailable prior to the announcement. After a promising start, slotting straight back in to the side hours after landing, former captain Kevin Muscat commented on his potential to be a key figure in the club. In February 2011, Leijer was appointed the captain of Melbourne Victory. Leijer was formerly the captain of Melbourne Victory from February 2011 to September 2013. On 17 September 2013, Leijer was replaced by Mark Milligan as Melbourne Victory's captain.

=== Chongqing Lifan ===
On 25 February 2015, Leijer transferred to Chinese Super League side Chongqing Lifan.

=== Suwon FC ===
On 2 February 2016, Leijer transferred to K League 1 side Suwon FC.

Leijer retired from football in January 2019 to take up a position with Adidas.

=== Dandenong City SC ===
During the 2019 mid season transfer window Adrian signed with National Premier Leagues Victoria side Dandenong City SC and made his first appearance at the round 14 clash against Avondale FC.

== International career ==
Adrian Leijer's first taste of the senior international scene was when he was selected by Guus Hiddink to train with the Socceroos before the 2006 FIFA World Cup in Germany. After his short training stint with the senior team he continued being selected for Young Socceroos squads. He had previously been a regular member of the Australia national under-23 football team, the Olyroos.

Leijer earned his first cap for the senior Australian national team against Singapore on 22 March 2008.

== Career statistics ==
Appearances and goals by club, season and competition
Club	Season	League			National cup		League cup		Continental		Other		Total	
Club	Season	Division	Apps	Goals	Apps	Goals	Apps	Goals	Apps	Goals	Apps	Goals	Apps	Goals
Melbourne Knights	2003–04	National Soccer League	20	0	—		—		—		—		20	0
Melbourne Victory	2005–06	A-League	20	1	—		2	0	—		1 (Note: Appearance in 2005 Australian Club World Championship Qualifying Tournament)	0	23	1
Melbourne Victory	2006–07	A-League	21	0	—		6	0	—		—		27	0
Melbourne Victory	2007–08	A-League	0	0	—		2	0	0	0	—		2	0
Melbourne Victory	Total		41	1	0	0	10	0	0	0	1	0	52	1
Fulham	2007–08	Premier League	0	0	0	0	0	0	—		—		0	0
Fulham	2008–09	Premier League	0	0	0	0	0	0	—		—		0	0
Norwich City (loan)	2008–09	Championship	4	0	0	0	0	0	—		—		4	0
Melbourne Victory	2009–10	A-League	28	3	—		—		5	0	—		33	3
Melbourne Victory	2010–11	A-League	28	1	—		—		6	1	—		34	2
Melbourne Victory	2011–12	A-League	18	0	—		—		—		—		18	0
Melbourne Victory	2012–13	A-League	27	2	—		—		—		—		27	2
Melbourne Victory	2013–14	A-League	20	0	—		—		4	0	—		24	0
Melbourne Victory	2014–15	A-League	14	0	3	0	—		—		—		17	0
Melbourne Victory	Total		135	6	3	0	0	0	15	1	0	0	153	7
Congqing Lifan	2015	Chinese Super League	24	1	0	0	—		—		—		24	1
Suwon	2016	K League Classic	28	0	1	0	—		—		—		29	1
Suwon	2017	K League Challenge	29	3	0	0	—		—		—		29	3
Suwon	2018	K League 2	9	0	0	0	—		—		—		9	0
Suwon	Total		66	3	1	0	0	0	0	0	0	0	67	3
Dandenong City	2019	National Premier Leagues Victoria	10	1	0	0	—		—		0	0	10	1
Dandenong City	2020	National Premier Leagues Victoria	5	0	—		—		—		—		5	0
Dandenong City	Total		15	1	0	0	0	0	0	0	0	0	15	1
Career total			305	12	4	0	10	0	15	1	1	0	335	13

== Honours ==
Melbourne Victory

- A-League Championship: 2006–07
- A-League Premiership: 2006–07
- A-League Pre-Season Challenge Cup Championship: 2008

Individual

- A-League Young Footballer of the Year: 2006–07
- Melbourne Victory Players Player of the Year: 2005–06
- Melbourne Victory Clubman of the Year: 2005–06
