= List of men's soccer players in Australia by number of league goals =

The following is a list of soccer players who have scored at least 100 domestic league goals in Australian league soccer. This includes the appearances and goals of players in the A-League Men and National Soccer League.

== List of players ==
As of 25 May 2024

Key

- † Football Australia Hall of Fame Inductee.
- Players still active in the Australian professional leagues are listed in **Bold**

Rank	Name	Goals	Apps	Ratio	Years	Clubs	Notes
1	(Australia) Damian Mori †	240	446	0.54	1989–2008	South Melbourne (5), Caroline Springs George Cross (4), Melbourne Croatia (11), Adelaide City (128), Perth Glory (84), Central Coast Mariners (6), Queensland Roar (2)	
2	(Australia) Jamie Maclaren	154	233	0.66	2013–2024	Perth Glory (11), Brisbane Roar (40), Melbourne City (103)	
3	(Kosovo) Besart Berisha	142	235	0.60	2011–2021	Brisbane Roar (48), Melbourne Victory (68), Western United (26)	
4	(Australia) Rod Brown	137	346	0.40	1983–1998	Marconi-Fairfield (50), APIA Leichhardt (35), Newcastle Breakers (12), Brisbane Strikers (40)	
5	(Australia) John Kosmina †	133	289	0.46	1977–1989	West Adelaide (24), Sydney City (89), Sydney Olympic (14), APIA Leichhardt (6)	
6	(Australia) Archie Thompson	129	333	0.39	1996–2016	Gippsland Falcons (10), Carlton (23), Marconi-Fairfield (6), Melbourne Victory (90)	(Note: Also scored 27 Belgian First Division goals in 90 matches.)
7	(Australia) Pablo Cardozo	127	302	0.42	1990–2004	Sydney Olympic (65), West Adelaide (40), Northern Spirit (14), Parramatta Power (8)	
8	(Australia) Francis Awaritefe	124	320	0.39	1989–2001	Melbourne Croatia (43), South Melbourne (34), Marconi-Fairfield (40), Sydney United (7)	(Note: Also scored 16 National League in 44 matches.)
9	(Australia) Bobby Despotovski	123	265	0.46	1994–2007	Heidelberg United (9), Morwell Falcons (1), Perth Glory (113)	
10	(Australia) Marshall Soper	121	319	0.38	1981–1995	APIA Leichhardt (26), Sydney Olympic (45), Wollongong City (6), Parramatta Eagles (42), Marconi Fairfield (2)	
11	(Australia) Paul Trimboli	119	452	0.26	1987–2004	Sunshine George Cross (4), South Melbourne (115)	
12	(Australia) Ivan Kelic	116	272	0.43	1989–2000	Melbourne Knights (75), Sydney Olympic (15), South Melbourne (26)	
13	(New Zealand) Vaughan Coveny	111	364	0.30	1992–2009	Melbourne Knights (4), Wollongong City (15), South Melbourne (82), Newcastle Jets (9), Wellington Phoenix (1)	
14	(Australia) John Markovski	110	372	0.30	1986–2002	Sunshine George Cross (20), Preston Makedonia (15), Melbourne Knights (8), Marconi-Fairfield (15), Gippsland Falcons (20), Canberra Cosmos (2), Carlton (18), Perth Glory (11), Football Kingz (1)	
15	(Australia) Ante Milicic	109	244	0.45	1992–2008	Sydney United (48), Sydney Olympic (30), Parramatta Power (20), Newcastle Jets (7), Queensland Roar (4)	(Note: Also scored 10 Eredivise goals in 47 matches, scored in 15 Croatian First Football League in 51 matches, scored 9 Malaysia Super League goals and scored 9 Malaysia Premier League goals.)
15	(Australia) Gary Cole †	109	247	0.44	1977–1986	Heidelberg United (88), Preston Makedonia (21)	
17	(Australia) Con Boutsianis	106	285	0.37	1989–2004	South Melbourne (74), Collingwood Warriors (7), Perth Glory (25)	
18	(Australia) Warren Spink	104	272	0.38	1985–1997	Preston Makedonia (35), Footscray JUST (22), Newcastle Breakers (29), Gippsland Falcons (12), South Melbourne (6)	
19	(Australia) Frank Farina †	102	206	0.50	1983–1999	Canberra City (15), Sydney City (21), Marconi-Fairfield (33), Brisbane Strikers (33)	(Note: Also scored 43 Belgian First Division goals in 75 matches and scored 20 Ligue 1 goals in 74 matches.)
20	(Australia) Andy Harper	101	321	0.31	1986–2001	St George-Budapest (22), Marconi-Fairfield (66), Brisbane Strikers (4), Newcastle Breakers (6), Newcastle United (3)	
21	(New Zealand) Shane Smeltz	100	245	0.41	1999–2017	Adelaide City (7), Adelaide United (1), Wellington Phoenix (24), Gold Coast United (28), Perth Glory (28), Sydney FC (12)	

== See also ==
- List of soccer players in Australia by number of league appearances
