= List of men's soccer players in Australia by number of league appearances =

The following is a list of soccer players who have made at least 300 domestic league appearances in Australian league soccer. This includes the appearances and goals of players in the A-League Men and National Soccer League.

Alex Tobin has made the most appearances, and is the only player to have played in over 500 games. John Markovski made appearances for 10 different clubs, while five players have made their appearances for only one team. Liam Reddy made his appearances during a career spanning 23 seasons.

== List of players ==
As of 25 May 2024

Key

- † Football Australia Hall of Fame inductee.
- Players in **bold** are still active players.

Player	Nationality	Games (Note: Number of League games only.)	Goals (Note: Number of League goals only.)	Position	Career span (Note: Displays first and last seasons where appearances made. For example - 1984–2004 displayed where first appearance was in the 1984 season and last appearance was in the 2003–04 season)	Seasons (Note: Number of League seasons only)	Clubs (Note: Number of different clubs where League appearances made; two or more spells with the same club are counted only once)	Notes
Alex Tobin †	Australia	522	31	DF	1984–2004	21	3	
Clint Bolton	Australia	479	0	GK	1993–2013	19	5	
Paul Trimboli	Australia	452	120	FW	1987–2004	18	2	
Damian Mori †	Australia	446	240	FW	1989–2008	20	6	
Sergio Melta †	Australia	446	65	MF	1977–1995	19	1	
Andrew Durante	New Zealand	416	7	DF	2001–2021	17	5	
Liam Reddy	Australia	413	1	GK	2000–2023	23	7	
Alex Wilkinson	Australia	409	4	DF	2002–2023	17	3	
Mike O'Shea	Australia	407	14	DF	1977–1996	19	3	
John Hutchinson	Malta	394	37	MF	1996–2015	18	4	
Andrew Marth	Australia	391	69	MF	1986–2004	20	4	
Theo Selemidis	Australia	390	24	MF	1977–1994	18	3	
Robbie Hooker	Australia	389	20	DF	1986–2002	17	7	
David Barrett	Australia	385	14	DF	1986–2003	17	4	
**Leigh Broxham**	Australia	385	5	MF	2006–	17	1	
Nikolai Topor-Stanley	Australia	380	13	DF	2006–2023	16	4	
Tom Pondeljak	Australia	379	72	MF	1996–2012	16	6	
John Markovski	Australia	372	112	FW	1986–2002	18	10	
Gary Phillips	Australia	372	19	MF	1982–1997	16	2	
Vaughan Coveny	New Zealand	364	112	FW	1992–2009	16	6	
Mehmet Durakovic	Australia	361	9	DF	1985–2004	17	5	
Matthew Bingley	Australia	357	45	MF	1988–2007	21	8	
Matthew Horsley	Australia	356	41	MF	1990–2006	15	2	
Danny Wright	Australia	351	49	FW	1980–1997	18	3	
Carl Veart	Australia	350	89	FW	1989–2007	13	2	
Matt McKay	Australia	350	28	MF	2001–2019	15	2	
Graham Jennings †	Australia	350	15	DF	1979–1994	14	4	
Rod Brown	Australia	347	136	FW	1983–1998	16	4	
Alan Hunter	Australia	345	53	DF	1983–1998	16	7	
Jade North	Australia	344	12	DF	1998–2018	17	6	
David Lowe	Australia	340	81	MF	1982–1997	15	4	
Steve Blair †	Australia	336	14	DF	1980–1993	13	1	
Eugene Galekovic	Australia	336	0	GK	2000–2019	18	5	
Archie Thompson	Australia	333	129	FW	1996–2016	17	4	
Joe Mullen	Australia	331	75	FW	1983–1996	14	1	
Jason Petkovic	Australia	331	0	GK	1993–2009	16	2	
Brad Maloney	Australia	330	88	MF	1990–2004	14	6	
Ian Gray †	Australia	329	50	MF	1980–1995	16	2	
Peter Katholos	Australia	329	49	MF	1979–1993	16	5	
Robert Stanton	Australia	329	10	DF	1990–2003	13	3	
Paul Wade †	Australia	327	54	MF	1984–1997	15	5	
Alan Davidson †	Australia	324	15	DF	1979–1998	17	4	
Andy Harper	Australia	321	100	FW	1986–2001	15	7	
Francis Awaritefe	Australia	320	121	FW	1989–2001	13	4	
Marshall Soper	Australia	319	121	FW	1981–1995	14	5	
David Ratcliffe †	Australia	316	18	DF	1978–1991	14	4	
Jean-Paul de Marigny	Australia	315	19	DF	1983–1998	16	4	
Matt Thompson	Australia	314	35	MF	1999–2014	14	4	
Angelo Costanzo	Australia	312	3	DF	1995–2010	14	4	
Kris Trajanovski	Australia	311	79	FW	1990–2004	13	6	
Charlie Yankos †	Australia	306	20	DF	1979–1994	15	5	
Pablo Cardozo	Australia	302	128	FW	1990–2004	14	5	
Gerry Gomez	Costa Rica	301	56	DF	1979–1994	16	4	
Bogdan Nyskohus	Australia	301	4	DF	1977–1989	13	1	

== See also ==
- List of soccer players in Australia by number of league goals
