= Kevin Muscat =

English-born Australian association footballer and Manager (born 1973)

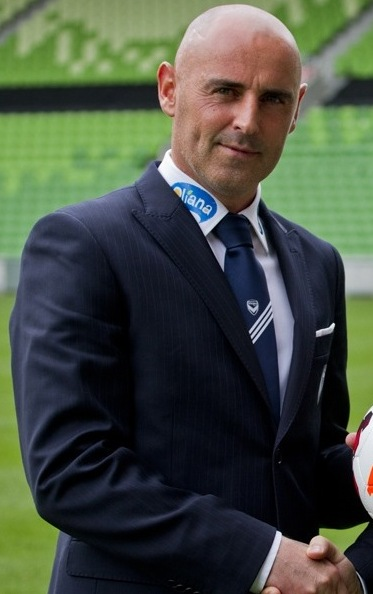
- Muscat in 2013

Personal information
- Full name: Kevin Vincent Muscat
- Date of birth: 7 August 1973 (age 53)
- Place of birth: Crawley, England
- Height: 1.80 m (5 ft 11 in)
- Position: Defender

Team information
- Current team: Shanghai Port (head coach)

Youth career
- 1989–1990: Sunshine George Cross
- 1990–1991: AIS

Senior career*
Years	Team	Apps	(Gls)
1989–1990	Sunshine George Cross	9	(0)
1991–1992	Heidelberg United	19	(0)
1992–1996	South Melbourne	70	(3)
1996–1997	Crystal Palace	53	(2)
1997–2002	Wolverhampton Wanderers	180	(14)
2002–2003	Rangers	22	(0)
2003–2005	Millwall	53	(0)
2005–2011	Melbourne Victory	113	(28)
2011	Sunshine George Cross	3	(1)
Total		522	(48)

International career
1991–1993	Australia U-20	9	(0)
1992–1996	Australia U-23	15	(1)
1994–2006	Australia	46	(10)

Managerial career
- 2011–2013: Melbourne Victory (assistant)
- 2012: Melbourne Victory (caretaker)
- 2013–2019: Melbourne Victory
- 2017: Australia (assistant)
- 2020: Sint-Truiden (technical director)
- 2020: Sint-Truiden
- 2021–2023: Yokohama F. Marinos
- 2023–: Shanghai Port
Medal record
Representing Australia
Men's Association football
FIFA Confederations Cup
Runner-up	1997 Saudi Arabia
Third place	2001 South Korea-Japan
OFC Nations Cup
Winner	2000 Tahiti
- * Club domestic league appearances and goals

Kevin Vincent Muscat (born 7 August 1973), better known by his nickname "Super Kev", is a professional soccer manager and former player who played as a defender. Born in England, he represented the Australia national team at international level, earning 46 caps between 1994 and 2006. He is currently the head coach of Chinese Super League club Shanghai Port.

After beginning his professional career in the Australian National Soccer League with Sunshine George Cross in 1989, Muscat played eight seasons in the United Kingdom with Crystal Palace, Wolverhampton Wanderers, Rangers and Millwall. He returned to Australia in 2005 for the first time since leaving South Melbourne in 1996 to captain Melbourne Victory in the inaugural season of the A-league. His playing style was brutal defence with little regard for accumulating yellow cards or avoiding injury to opponents.

Muscat retired from professional football in March 2011 after Melbourne Victory's 2011 AFC Champions League campaign, citing his growing frustration at his inability to keep pace with the game. Muscat briefly rejoined his former club Sunshine George Cross for part of the 2011 Victorian State League Division 1 season. Muscat is Melbourne Victory's all time top scoring defender, with 35 goals in all competitions.

During his international career, Muscat represented the Australia U-20 side at the 1991 FIFA World Youth Championship in Portugal and the 1993 FIFA World Youth Championship in Australia. He represented the Australia U-23 side at the 1996 Summer Olympics. After making his full international debut for Australia in September 1994 against Kuwait, Muscat represented the national side at the 1997 FIFA Confederations Cup, 2000 OFC Nations Cup, 2001 FIFA Confederations Cup and the 2005 FIFA Confederations Cup.

After several seasons as an assistant coach, Muscat was appointed head coach at Melbourne Victory in October 2013. He coached Victory to the 2014–15 A-League Premiership, the 2014–15 A-League Championship and success in the 2015 FFA Cup. He left the role in 2019.

== Club career ==
=== Early life ===
Born in Crawley, West Sussex, in England from Maltese descent, Muscat began his career as a junior at Australian National Soccer League (NSL) club Sunshine George Cross, making his first senior appearances for the club in the 1989–90 season at 16 years old. He moved from Sunshine to the Australian Institute of Sport in 1990 and was awarded the Weinstein Medal as the Victorian Junior Player of the year.

=== South Melbourne FC ===
He continued playing in the NSL for Heidelberg United in the 1991–92 season before earning a move to Australian powerhouse South Melbourne Hellas. Mostly deployed as a left-back, Muscat's aggressiveness and defensive awareness made him a standout performer in the league which attracted international attention. During his time at South, he was called up to the Olyroos.

In 1995–96 he trialled at Sheffield United under manager Dave Bassett but decided to stay at South Melbourne. After further impressive performances with South Melbourne and the Olyroos, he attracted the interest of many overseas clubs. His performances for South culminated in a senior international call-up by Eddie Thompson for the Australian National Team. By August 1996 Bassett had taken the helm at Crystal Palace and signed Muscat for the south London club for £35,000 from South Melbourne Hellas. In his departure Muscat thanked the South Melbourne fans for their support towards him.

=== Crystal Palace ===
Muscat was part of the Palace team that subsequently won promotion to the English Premier League, defeating Sheffield United in the 1997 play-off final at Wembley. Muscat obtained a reputation as a 'hard man' at Palace and was constantly targeted by the media and opposing fans for his style of play. He made nine Premier League appearances for Palace before moving to First Division Wolverhampton Wanderers for £200,000 in October 1997.

=== Wolverhampton Wanderers ===
Muscat remained at Wolves for five seasons before moving to Scotland to join Rangers on a free transfer in July 2002.

=== Rangers ===
Muscat was part of the Rangers squad which won a treble of domestic trophies in 2002–03 season. He helped the club's defence keep six consecutive clean sheets in the league between 25 August 2002 and 28 September 2002. Muscat would end his career in Scotland having played 29 times for Rangers.

=== Millwall ===
On 29 August 2003, Muscat signed for Millwall in the English First Division on a three-year contract; it was his fourth and final British club. He was part of the team that reached the FA Cup final in 2004, though his season ended with a knee ligament injury in the semi-final win over Sunderland, through a collision with George McCartney.

=== Melbourne Victory ===
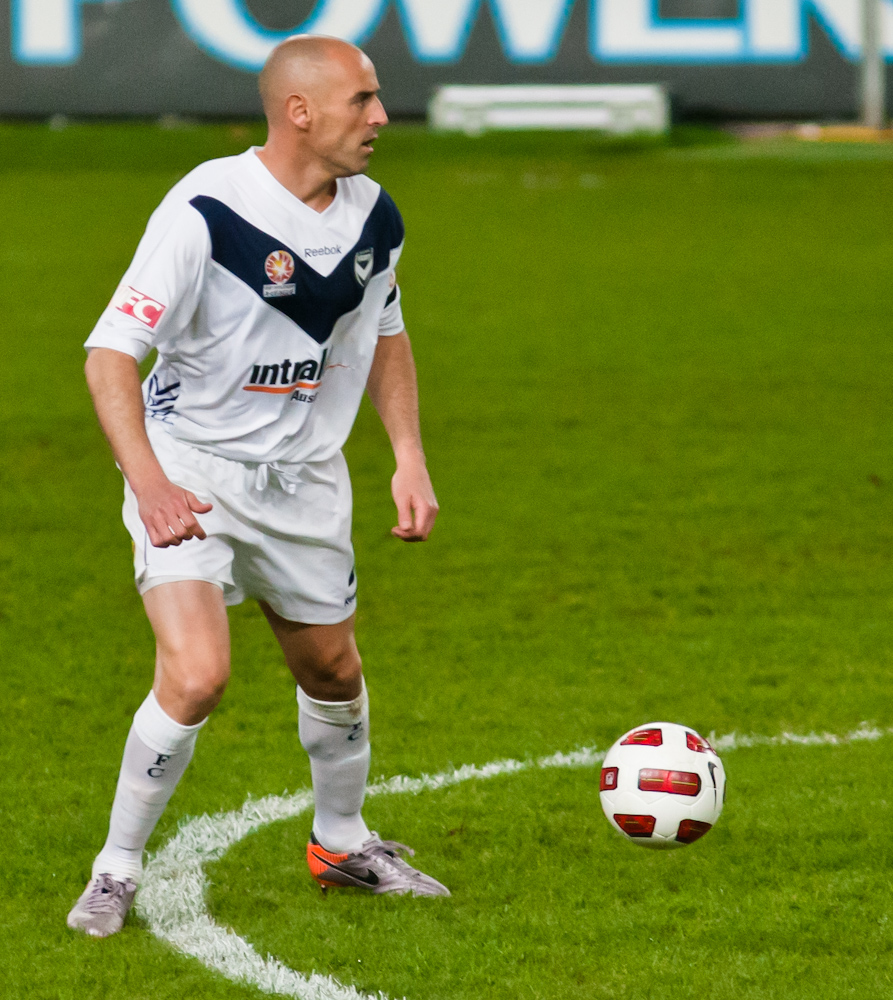
Muscat with Melbourne Victory in 2010

On 5 May 2005, Muscat agreed to a three-year deal at Melbourne Victory FC in the new A-League. He was the club's inaugural captain in the 2005–06 season. Under Victory manager Ernie Merrick, Muscat, a defender for virtually his entire career, moved to midfield for the 2006–07 season. He remained the captain until 2011.

In February 2011, Muscat announced his intention to retire from club football after the conclusion of the 2011 Asian Champions League. His decision to finish was fast-tracked by an infamous tackle he committed in a Melbourne derby on 22 January 2011, which resulted in a season-ending eight-week ban from the A-League. Muscat played out his competitive career in the 2011 AFC Champions League under the captaincy of centre-back Adrian Leijer, despite having previously referred to the competition as "not all that enjoyable". Muscat regained the captaincy for his farewell match in Melbourne, a 1–1 draw against J-League side Gamba Osaka. Muscat scored on his return to Sunshine George Cross in a 3–1 loss to Altona Magic in August 2011.

== International career ==
Muscat represented Australia at Under-20 level at the World Youth Cup finals in Portugal in 1991 and Australia in 1993, and at Under-23 level at the 1996 Atlanta Olympic Games. He made his full international debut in September 1994 against Kuwait, and went on to make 51 appearances for the national team, including Confederations Cup tournaments in 1997, 2001 and 2005. Muscat captained the national team five times from April 2001 and scored a critical penalty in the 1–0 home leg of Australia's unsuccessful play-off against Uruguay for a place in the finals of the 2002 FIFA World Cup.

Muscat was dropped from the squad when coach Guus Hiddink took over in 2005 and played no part in Australia's subsequent qualification for the 2006 World Cup, but was recalled later in 2006 by Graham Arnold and captained Australia in its 2–0 Asian Cup qualifier against Kuwait. In 2008, newly appointed coach Pim Verbeek selected Muscat in a squad of 22 A-League based players to prepare for 2010 FIFA World Cup qualifiers, but he did not play in any subsequent fixtures.

== Reputation ==
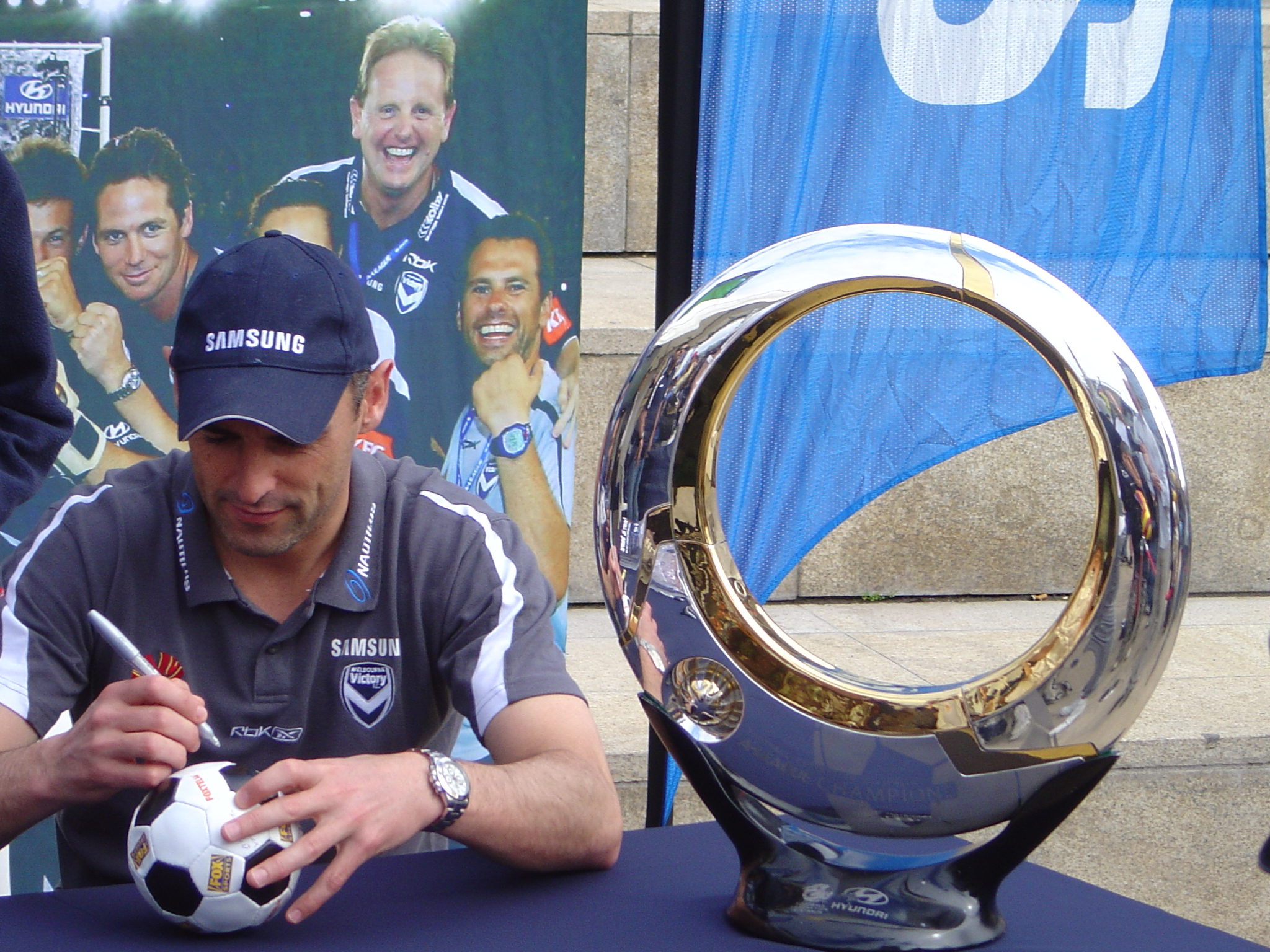
Muscat in 2007 next to the A-League 2006/07 championship trophy

In 1996, Muscat was sent off in his first season in the UK in a match involving Crystal Palace and Norwich City after body checking Norwich player Darren Eadie which then sparked a 21-man melee where punches were thrown. Two other players were also sent off in the incident.

Muscat was branded a "lowlife" and a "nobody" by Nottingham Forest striker Ian Wright, in September 1999. Wright said he was about to shoot when he heard Dougie Freedman, Forest's other striker, shout "leave it". Wright stepped over the ball to allow Freedman to hit it, but instead Muscat cleared the ball; according to Wright, Muscat impersonated Freedman.

Muscat was dubbed the "most hated man in football" by Birmingham City player Martin Grainger in 2000 after a reckless tackle against international teammate, Stan Lazaridis. He seriously injured both Craig Bellamy and Christophe Dugarry, the latter in a friendly international between Australia and France in 2001 with a sliding tackle from behind. The French manager Roger Lemerre dubbed the tackle "an act of brutality".

In March 2002, Muscat was sent off after nine minutes in a match against Grimsby Town for elbowing Grimsby striker Michael Boulding. Wolves lost the match and Muscat was suspended for three matches following the incident.

In 2003, after only three weeks since signing for Millwall, Muscat was fined and reprimanded by Millwall after a match against Watford where he gave away a penalty and was sent off for stamping on Watford's Danny Webber. Millwall chief executive, Ken Brown, formally warned Muscat that he would be sacked if he did not "clean up his act." "Kevin's actions were totally unacceptable. We have made him aware that such behavior will not be tolerated. Any repeat of such a deliberate, unprovoked, off-the-ball incident will result in his instant dismissal."

In 2004, a lawsuit on Muscat brought by former Charlton Athletic player Matty Holmes resulted in a settlement of £250,000 plus costs in favour of Holmes, bringing the estimated settlement to around £750,000. Holmes had to have four operations on his leg following a tackle by Muscat in 1998, and there were initial fears that his leg might have to be amputated. The claim was settled at the High Court without any admission of liability. In a League Cup tie while at Millwall, he grabbed the throat of Liverpool striker Milan Baroš. Also in 2004, Iwan Roberts admitted he deliberately stamped on Muscat in a match against Norwich City in revenge for his attempt to injure Craig Bellamy in 1999. Roberts was subsequently fined and suspended by The Football Association for his comments.

In March later that year while playing for Millwall, Muscat was red carded and suspended for five games following an altercation in the tunnel at half time with Sheffield United goalkeeper Paddy Kenny. United went on to win the game 2–1 despite having to use an outfield player in goal, and as Millwall players were walking off the pitch, Blades manager Neil Warnock was seen shaking players’ hands while also saying “serves you right for f*cking Muscat, that”.

In December 2005, he was the first A-League player to appear before a FFA disciplinary hearing and was subsequently suspended for two matches for "violent conduct". At an A-league game in October 2006 Muscat clashed with then Adelaide United coach John Kosmina, knocking Kosmina from his chair while retrieving the ball. Kosmina responded by grabbing Muscat by the throat, an action for which Kosmina was suspended for four matches.

Muscat's dominant personality and aggressive style did win some admirers in the A-League, with former England international Terry Butcher stating "Every manager in the A-League would love to have Kevin, and I'm no exception".

In February 2009, Muscat "escaped" further sanction by the FFA for stamping on Adelaide United defender, Daniel Mullen, while challenging for the ball. Due to the referee seeing the incident during the match, as according to A-League protocol, the Match Review Panel had no authority to intervene any further.

In January 2010, Muscat was suspended for two games for elbowing Gold Coast United midfielder, Jason Culina, in an off the ball incident.

In October 2010, Manchester United winger Ashley Young recalled he was threatened by Muscat during his first professional match as an 18-year-old. "Kevin Muscat said he would break my legs if I went past him," said Young. Their meeting occurred as they were warming up for an encounter between Watford and Millwall back in September 2003, but Muscat was sent off for stamping on Watford's Danny Webber before Young came on as substitute for Watford.

In January 2011, Muscat was sent off for elbowing Adelaide United midfielder Adam Hughes in the face while following through on a challenge for the ball.

In his first match back from suspension, Muscat was then suspended for eight matches following a tackle on Melbourne Heart player Adrian Zahra in a Melbourne Derby,. The tackle was widely condemned in Australia and around the world, with former Socceroo Mark Bosnich calling it a "disgrace".

In a professional career spanning 19 years from 1992 to 2011, Muscat received 123 yellow cards and 12 red cards.

In December 2013, the Spanish football website El Gol Digital named Muscat as football's dirtiest ever player.

== Coaching career ==
=== Melbourne Victory ===
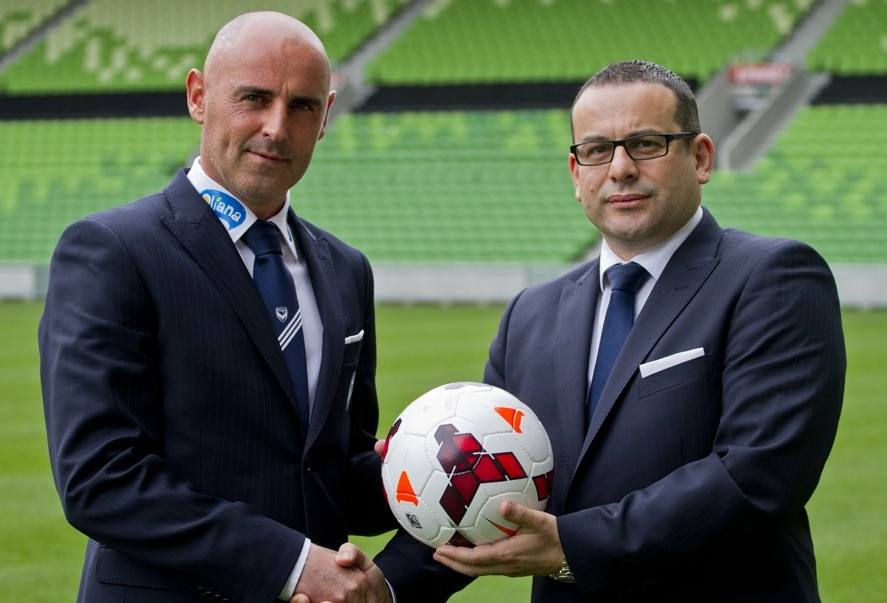
Kevin Muscat alongside Melbourne Victory chairman Anthony Di Pietro at the Melbourne Rectangular Stadium in October 2013.

For the final two years of his playing career, Muscat served as a playing assistant coach under Ernie Merrick. Due to a clause in his contract with Melbourne Victory, which made him an assistant coach at Melbourne Victory for the next two years after his retirement, Muscat began serving as an assistant coach at Melbourne Victory shortly after his retirement from football. After Mehmet Durakovic was sacked after a poor run of results, Muscat was appointed as the caretaker coach of Melbourne Victory until he was succeeded by former Ipswich Town and Queens Park Rangers manager Jim Magilton. In his only game as Victory manager, Melbourne Victory defeated the Newcastle Jets 2–1, with two own goals from defender Byun Sung-Hwan.

After an underwhelming tenure as Melbourne Victory manager, in which he recorded just two wins in 12 matches, Magilton left the Victory at the conclusion of the 2011–12 A-League with Brisbane Roar manager Ange Postecoglou taking the reins at Victory for the beginning of the 2012–13 A-League season, signing a three-year contract. After a relatively successful first season in charge of the Victory, in which the Victory finished 3rd on the A-League ladder, and made it to the semi-finals of the A-League finals, Postecoglou was appointed the new manager of Australia, with Postecoglou departing the Victory after their Round 3 win against Postecoglou's former club, Brisbane Roar. Having served under four managers since his appointment as assistant coach, Muscat was subsequently appointed as Postecoglou's successor on 31 October 2013, three games into the 2013–14 season, on a two-year contract.

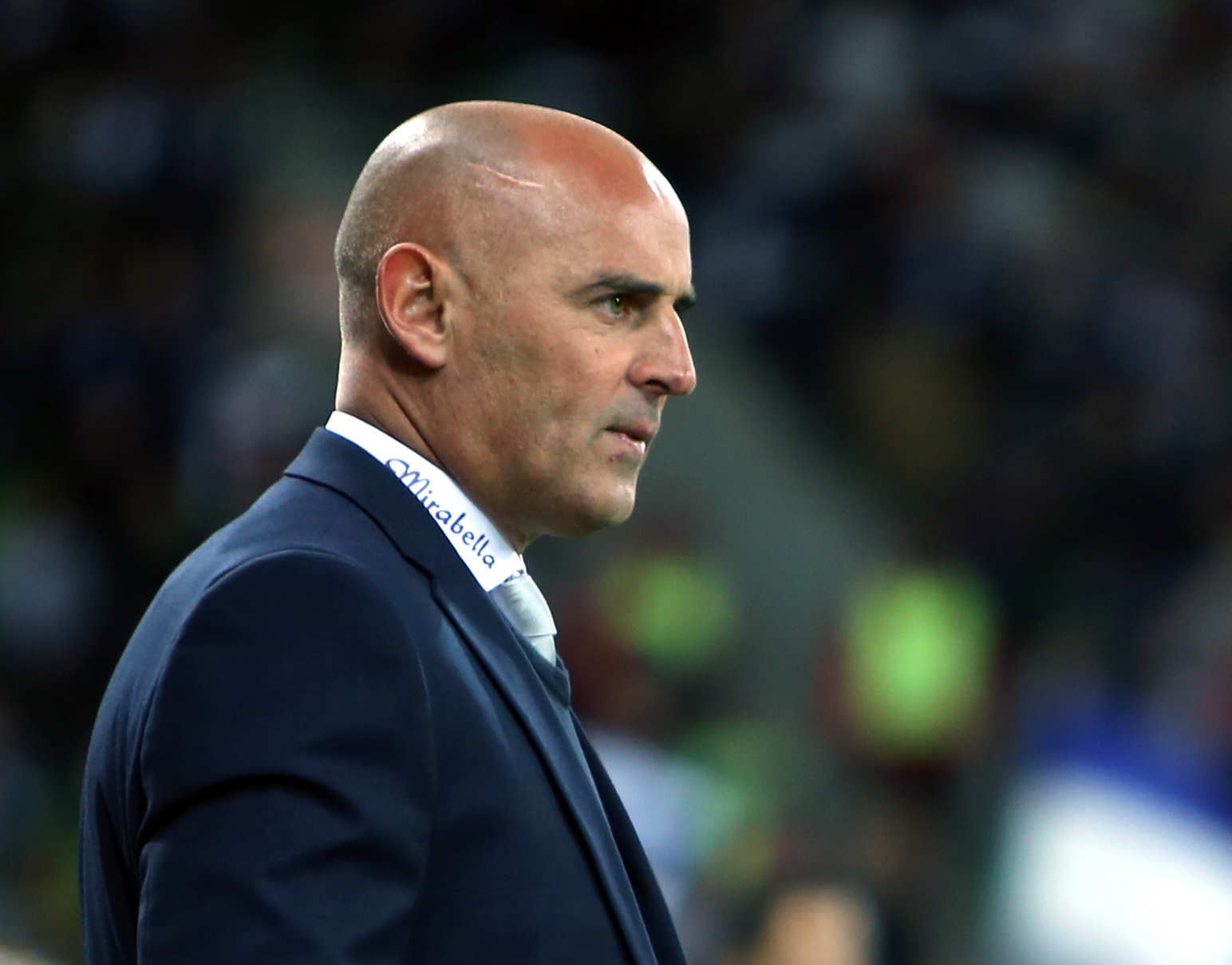
Kevin Muscat coaching Melbourne Victory against Adelaide United in the FFA Cup, September 2015

In his first full season as Melbourne Victory manager, and just his second year in charge of the club, Muscat guided Melbourne Victory to an A-League premiership-championship double in 2015, the Victory's third A-League premiership/championship double. Under Muscat, the Victory finished with a regular season record of 15 wins 8 draws and 4 losses, with a final points tally of 53 points, three points ahead of second placed Sydney FC and a final goal difference of +25, the highest of any club that season. Muscat guided the Victory to a 3–0 win over Melbourne City in the semi-finals, before recording a 3–0 win over Sydney FC at AAMI Park.

In June 2017, Muscat, along with Darren Davies and Ross Aloisi, were called up by Ange Postecoglou to serve as members of Australia's coaching staff for the 2017 FIFA Confederations Cup.

=== Sint-Truidense ===
On 5 June 2020 Muscat was announced as the manager for Belgian First Division A team Sint-Truidense V.V., however just six months later he was sacked due to poor results.

=== Yokohama F. Marinos ===
Muscat was appointed manager of Yokohama F. Marinos in July 2021, succeeding Ange Postecoglou as he had at Melbourne Victory, and won the J1 League title in 2022.

=== Shanghai Port ===
On 17 December 2023 Muscat was appointed manager of Shanghai Port following the departure of Javier Pereira. Under his management, Shanghai Port won the 2024 Chinese Super League season by finishing ahead of their inter-city rivals Shanghai Shenhua by a slim point, as well as winning the 2024 Chinese FA Cup.

== Career statistics ==
=== Club ===
Appearances and goals by club, season and competition
Club	Season	League			National cup (Note: Includes FA Cup, Scottish FA Cup)		League cup (Note: Includes NSL Cup, Football League Cup, Scottish League Cup, A-League Pre-Season Challenge Cup)		Continental		Other		Total	
Club	Season	Division	Apps	Goals	Apps	Goals	Apps	Goals	Apps	Goals	Apps	Goals	Apps	Goals
Sunshine George Cross	1989–90	National Soccer League	9	0	—		0	0	—		—		9	0
Heidelberg United	1991–92	National Soccer League	19	0	—		0	0	—		—		19	0
South Melbourne	1992–93	National Soccer League	17	0	—		0	0	—		—		17	0
South Melbourne	1993–94	National Soccer League	24	2	—		3	0	—		—		27	2
South Melbourne	1994–95	National Soccer League	17	0	—		4	0	—		3 (Note: Appearances in National Soccer League finals series)	3	24	3
South Melbourne	1995–96	National Soccer League	12	1	—		0	0	—		—		12	1
South Melbourne	Total		70	3	0	0	7	0	—		3	3	80	6
Crystal Palace	1996–97	First Division	44	2	2	0	3	1	—		2 (Note: Appearances in Football League First Division play-offs)	0	51	3
Crystal Palace	1997–98	Premier League	9	0	0	0	1	0	—		—		10	0
Crystal Palace	Total		53	2	2	0	4	1	—		2	0	61	3
Wolverhampton Wanderers	1997–98	First Division	24	3	5	0	0	0	—		—		29	3
Wolverhampton Wanderers	1998–99	First Division	37	4	2	0	4	0	—		—		43	4
Wolverhampton Wanderers	1999–2000	First Division	45	4	2	0	2	0	—		—		49	4
Wolverhampton Wanderers	2000–01	First Division	37	3	1	0	4	1	—		—		42	4
Wolverhampton Wanderers	2001–02	First Division	37	0	1	0	0	0	—		0	0	38	0
Wolverhampton Wanderers	Total		180	14	11	0	10	1	—		0	0	201	15
Rangers	2002–03	Scottish Premier League	22	0	4	0	1	0	2 (Note: Appearances in UEFA Cup)	0	—		29	0
Millwall	2003–04	First Division	27	0	6	0	0	0	—		—		33	0
Millwall	2004–05	Championship	26	0	0	0	1	0	2	0	—		29	0
Millwall	Total		53	0	6	0	1	0	2	0	—		62	0
Melbourne Victory	2005–06	A-League	17	6	—		3	0	—		—		20	6
Melbourne Victory	2006–07	A-League	17	7	—		5	1	—		3 (Note: Appearances in A-League finals series)	0	25	8
Melbourne Victory	2007–08	A-League	17	4	—		5	0	6 (Note: Appearances in AFC Champions League)	2	—		28	6
Melbourne Victory	2008–09	A-League	21	5	—		0	0	—		3	0	24	5
Melbourne Victory	2009–10	A-League	20	4	—		—		4	1	3	0	27	5
Melbourne Victory	2010–11	A-League	21	2	—		—		6	3	0	0	27	5
Melbourne Victory	Total		113	28	0	0	13	1	16	6	9	0	151	35
Sunshine George Cross	2011	Victorian State League	3	1	—		—		—		—		3	1
Total			522	48	23	0	36	3	20	6	14	3	615	60

=== International ===
Appearances and goals by national team and year
National team	Year	Apps	Goals
Australia
Australia	1994	1	0
Australia	1995	1	0
Australia	1996	5	0
Australia	1997	6	1
Australia	1998	1	0
Australia	1999	0	0
Australia	2000	10	4
Australia	2001	13	5
Australia	2002	0	0
Australia	2003	2	0
Australia	2004	3	0
Australia	2005	3	0
Australia	2006	1	0
Total		46	10

Scores and results list Australia's goal tally first, score column indicates score after each Muscat goal.

List of international goals scored by Kevin Muscat
No.	Date	Venue	Opponent	Score	Result	Competition
1	2 April 1997	Népstadion, Budapest, Hungary	Hungary	3–1	3–1	Friendly
2	19 June 2000	Stade Pater, Papeete, Tahiti	Cook Islands	2–0	17–0	2000 OFC Nations Cup
3	19 June 2000	Stade Pater, Papeete, Tahiti	Cook Islands	7–0	17–0	2000 OFC Nations Cup
4	23 June 2000	Stade Pater, Papeete, Tahiti	Solomon Islands	5–0	6–0	2000 OFC Nations Cup
5	25 June 2000	Stade Pater, Papeete, Tahiti	Vanuatu	1–0	1–0	2000 OFC Nations Cup
6	9 April 2001	Coffs Harbour International Stadium, Coffs Harbour, Australia	Tonga	4–0	22–0	2002 FIFA World Cup qualification
7	9 April 2001	Coffs Harbour International Stadium, Coffs Harbour, Australia	Tonga	7–0	22–0	2002 FIFA World Cup qualification
8	9 April 2001	Coffs Harbour International Stadium, Coffs Harbour, Australia	Tonga	12–0	22–0	2002 FIFA World Cup qualification
9	9 April 2001	Coffs Harbour International Stadium, Coffs Harbour, Australia	Tonga	19–0	22–0	2002 FIFA World Cup qualification
10	20 November 2001	Melbourne Cricket Ground, Melbourne, Australia	Uruguay	1–0	1–0	2002 FIFA World Cup qualification

== Managerial statistics ==
As of match played 3 November 2026

Managerial record by team and tenure
Team	Nat.	From	To	Record								Ref.
Team	Nat.	From	To	G	W	D	L	GF	GA	GD	Win %	Ref.
Melbourne Victory (caretaker)	(Australia)	5 January 2012	7 January 2012	1	1	0	0	2	1	+1	100.00	
Melbourne Victory	(Australia)	31 October 2013	20 May 2019	214	105	45	64	371	285	+86	49.07	
Sint-Truiden	(Belgium)	5 June 2020	2 December 2020	14	2	5	7	17	27	−10	14.29	
Yokohama F. Marinos	(Japan)	18 July 2021	13 December 2023	116	67	19	30	229	129	+100	57.76	
Shanghai Port	(China)	17 December 2023	Present	124	70	25	29	273	171	+102	56.45	
Career Total				469	245	94	130	892	613	+279	52.24	

^{1} A win or loss by the penalty shoot-out is regarded as the draw in time.

== Honours ==
=== Player ===
South Melbourne FC

- National Soccer League Premiers: 1992–93
- NSL Cup: 1995–96
- Dockerty Cup: 1993, 1995

Crystal Palace

- Football League First Division play-offs: 1997

Rangers

- Scottish Premier League: 2002–03
- Scottish Cup: 2002–03
- Scottish League Cup: 2002–03

Melbourne Victory

- A-League Championship: 2006–07, 2008–09
- A-League Premiership: 2006–07, 2008–09
- A-League Pre-Season Challenge Cup: 2008–09

Australia

- FIFA Confederations Cup: runner-up, 1997; 3rd place, 2001
- OFC Nations Cup: 2000

Individual

- FFV Weinstein Medal: 1990
- NSL Young Player of the Year: 1993
- NSL Papasavas Medal (U-21): 1991–92
- Melbourne Victory Medal: 2005–06, 2006–07, 2008–09
- A-League PFA Team of the Season: 2008–09, 2009–10
- PFA A-League Team of the Decade (2005–15)

=== Manager ===
Melbourne Victory

- A-League Championship: 2014–15, 2017–18
- A-League Premiership: 2014–15
- FFA Cup: 2015

Yokohama F. Marinos

- J1 League: 2022
- J1 League runner-up: 2021, 2023
- Japanese Super Cup: 2023

Shanghai Port

- Chinese Super League: 2024, 2025
- Chinese FA Cup: 2024

Individual

- A-League Coach of the Year: 2014–15
