= Ricky Diaco =

Australian footballer

Personal information
- Full name: Ricky Diaco
- Date of birth: 6 June 1982 (age 44)
- Place of birth: Australia
- Height: 1.83 m (6 ft 0 in)
- Position: Striker

Senior career*
Years	Team	Apps	(Gls)
2001	Essendon Royals	11	(0)
2002–2003	Springvale White Eagles	44	(18)
2004	Frankston Pines	20	(6)
2005	Bulleen Zebras	6	(1)
2005–2006	Melbourne Victory FC	13	(1)
2006–2007	Bulleen Zebras	12	(5)
2007–2008	South Melbourne	35	(13)
2009–2013	Oakleigh Cannons	86	(28)
2014	South Springvale	14	(1)
- * Club domestic league appearances and goals as of 18 August 2015

Ricky Diaco (born 6 June 1982) is an Australian footballer who currently plays for South Springvale.

== Biography ==
An important turning point for Diaco's career was winning the VPL (Victorian Premier League) Gold Medal award for best player in the league in 2004 whilst at Frankston Pines (tying with Doug Mladenović of Altona Magic).

Prior to this Diaco had stints with Essendon Royals and Springvale White Eagles. For the 2005 VPL season Diaco made yet another move, joining Bulleen Zebras. However his tenure at the Veneto Club was short lived when his rapid improvement was rewarded with a contract at newly formed A-League team Melbourne Victory. Diaco has also represented Australia in Futsal.

Diaco was released by Melbourne Victory FC at the end of the 05/06 season and played the remainder of the 2006 VPL season with the Bulleen Zebras. During the 2007 pre-season he signed a 2-year contract for South Melbourne FC. At the end of his 2-year contract with South Melbourne FC him and the club parted ways and he was signed by Oakleigh Cannons.
