= Archie Thompson =

Australian soccer player (born 1978)

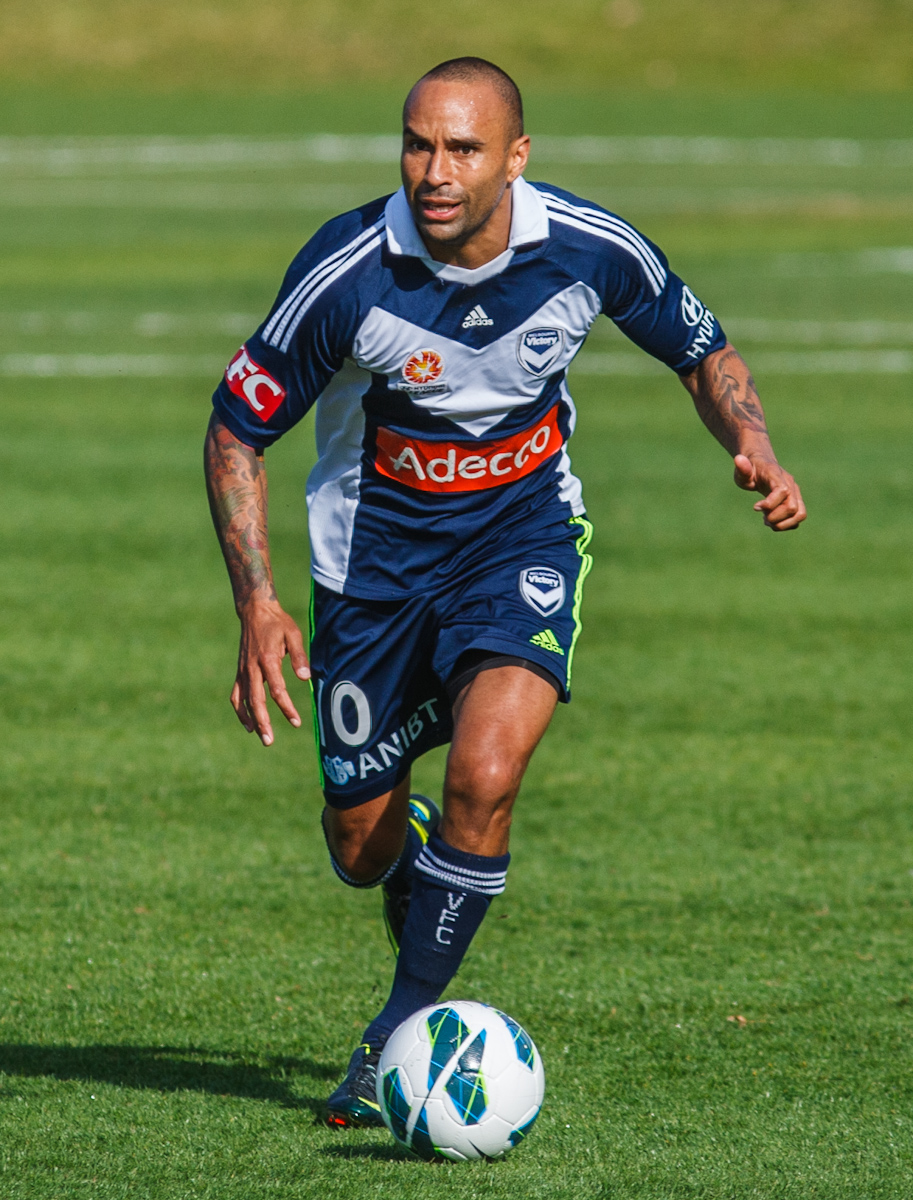
- Thompson playing for Melbourne Victory FC in 2012

Personal information
- Full name: Archie Gerald Thompson
- Date of birth: 23 October 1978 (age 48)
- Place of birth: Ōtorohanga, New Zealand
- Height: 1.74 m (5 ft 9 in)
- Positions: Striker; winger

Youth career
- Lithgow Rangers
- Twin City Wanderers
- 1994–1995: NSWIS

Senior career*
| Years | Team | Apps | (Gls) |
| 1995–1996 | Bathurst '75 | 16 | (9) |
| 1996–1999 | Gippsland Falcons | 43 | (10) |
| 1999–2000 | Carlton SC | 53 | (23) |
| 2001 | Marconi Stallions | 13 | (6) |
| 2001–2005 | Lierse | 90 | (28) |
| 2005–2016 | Melbourne Victory | 224 | (90) |
| 2006 | → PSV (loan) | 2 | (0) |
| 2016 | Heidelberg United | 2 | (0) |
| 2017–2019 | Murray United | 38 | (12) |
| 2019 | Racing Murcia | 1 | (1) |
| 2020 | Essendon Royals | 0 | (0) |
| Total | | 482 | (179) |

International career
| 1998–2001 | Australia U-23 | 8 | (1) |
| 2008 | Australia Olympic (O.P.) | 2 | (0) |
| 2001–2013 | Australia | 54 | (28) |
Medal record
Men's football
Representing Australia
FIFA Confederations Cup
| Third place | 2001 Japan–South Korea |
OFC Nations Cup
| Winner | 2004 |
- * Club domestic league appearances and goals

Archie Gerald Thompson (born 23 October 1978) is an Australian former professional soccer player who played as a forward. He serves as a club ambassador for Melbourne Victory FC.

Born in New Zealand, Thompson played youth football at the New South Wales Institute of Sport before going on to play numerous seasons in the National Soccer League and A-League. After eleven seasons with Melbourne Victory, he moved on to play for Heidelberg United in 2016. Thompson also played overseas, for Belgian Pro League side Lierse and for Dutch Eredivisie side PSV Eindhoven.

Thompson has played over 50 times for the Australian national team, scoring 28 goals. He was in the squad for the 2006 FIFA World Cup, the 2001 and 2005 FIFA Confederations Cups, the 2007 AFC Asian Cup, the 2008 Summer Olympics and the successful 2004 OFC Nations Cup.

He previously held the all-time goal-scoring record for a single international match, having scored 13 goals in a 31–0 victory against American Samoa in 2001. That record was subsequently surpassed by Muhammad Nazriev, who scored 14 goals in a U-17 international match against Guam. In that same qualification campaign, Thompson scored 16 goals, which made him the top scorer. As of November 2024, Thompson is Melbourne Victory's all time top goalscorer, with 97 goals in all competitions, and is Melbourne Victory's most capped forward of all time, with 262 appearances in all competitions.

In 2015, preeminent football journalist Michael Cockerill declared Thompson was the "greatest player in A-League history".

== Club career ==
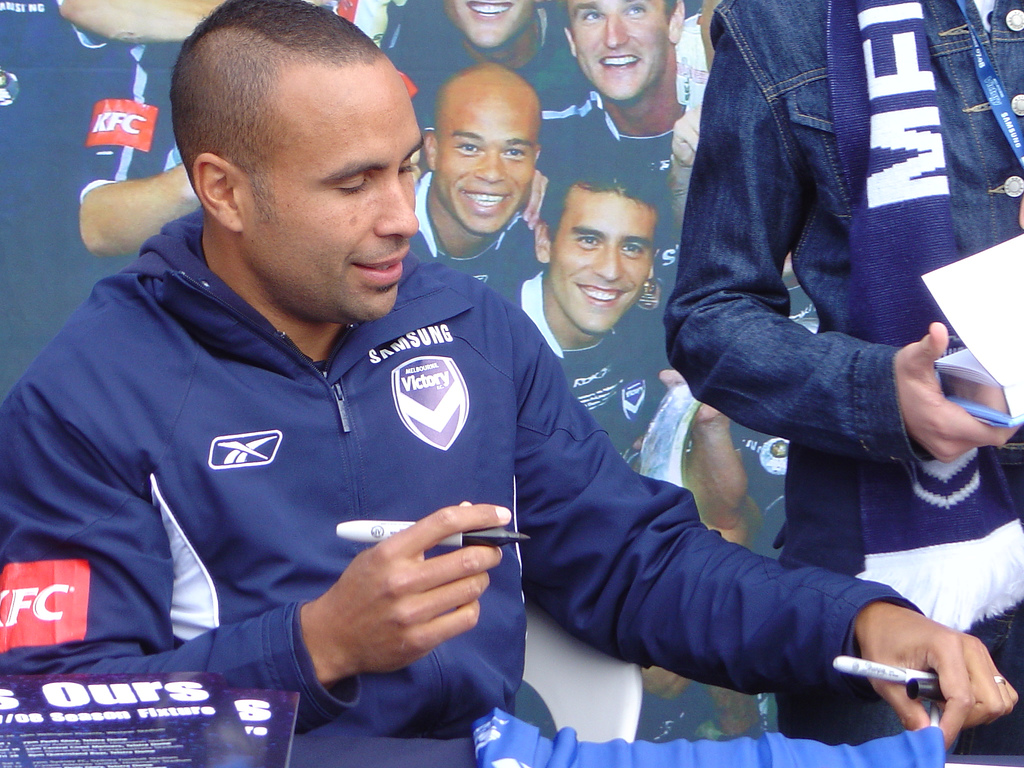
Thompson signing an autograph at a Melbourne Victory fan day

=== Early career ===
Archie Thompson began his career as a teenager with Bathurst '75 FC, breaking into the senior squad in 1995. At the close of the 1995 season, he secured a move to the National Soccer League, signing with the Gippsland Falcons midway through the 1996–97 season. His exceptional pace and skill on the ball were instantly recognisable in a mediocre team, and it wasn't long before he was snapped up by Carlton, becoming a key goalscorer in an attack-minded squad. The demise of Carlton saw a return to Sydney, where he spent the remainder of the 2000–01 season with Marconi, before ultimately signing with Belgium's Lierse SK. A fan favourite, Thompson scored 9 goals in his first season with the Belgian First Division club before injury curtailed his progress. In his fourth season in Belgium, he was the club's leading scorer, with 14 goals in 29 league appearances.

=== Melbourne Victory ===
Due to his strong form, he was lured back home to play for Melbourne Victory in 2005 (the inaugural A-League season), scoring the team's first ever regular season goal. With the A-League season finishing in March and a four-month gap between then and Australia's first World Cup group match, Thompson was approached in late 2005 join Dutch team PSV Eindhoven on a temporary loan. PSV was then coached by Guus Hiddink, who was also the Australian national team's head coach, and playing for the team would provide Thompson with the match fitness and exposure to help his chances of being selected in the World Cup team. After negotiations between the Victory and PSV stalled over the financial terms of the deal, Thompson was officially placed on six-month loan to PSV Eindhoven on 13 January 2006. He played what was thought at the time to be his final Melbourne Victory game against Queensland Roar, scoring the only goal as the team's acting captain. This goal took his tally to 8 for the season, which made him Melbourne Victory's inaugural Golden Boot winner. He also tied for the A-League's top goal scorer (the Reebok Golden Boot award) with Alex Brosque, Bobby Despotovski and Stewart Petrie. Thompson made just two appearances for PSV as a substitute. He was informed by the club that they would not be signing him to a further deal, and so he returned to Melbourne Victory for the A-League 2006-07 season.

Resuming with Melbourne Victory in domestic football, Thompson formed a deadly partnership in the second season of the A-League with strike partner Danny Allsopp, who both benefited from the attacking skills of Brazilian midfielder Fred.

Their quality forward play lead Melbourne to become both premiers and champions of the A-League in 2006–07.

Thompson starred in the 2007 A-League Grand Final on 18 February 2007, scoring 5 goals and helping Melbourne Victory to a 6–0 thrashing of rivals Adelaide United. In becoming the first player to score more than 3 goals in an A-League match, Thompson exceeded his own expectations, predicting before the game that he would get a hat trick. For his efforts, Thompson was awarded the Joe Marston Medal as the Man of the Match.

Thompson scored the winner against Robbie Fowler's North Queensland Fury in the third game of the 2009–10 A-League season.

During the 2009–2010 Hyundai A League grand final between the Melbourne Victory and Sydney FC, Archie was stretchered off after only 12 minutes due to tearing his knee ligaments. During the post game interview, Archie confirmed that it looks like he will require a full knee reconstruction, resulting in him being out of action for up to 12 months.

Thompson played his first game in the A-League 2010–11 season loss against Gold Coast United, after coming back from a major knee reconstruction.

He went on to win the 2014–15 A-League and 2015 FFA Cup with Victory.

On 30 April 2016, Melbourne Victory announced they hadn't renewed Thompson's contract with Thompson departing the club at the end of their 2016 ACL campaign. Thompson spent 11 seasons with the club, scoring 90 goals, 10 of them in finals matches (both numbers being records at the time of his departure from the club).

On 12 September 2016, Thompson was appointed as a club ambassador of Melbourne Victory.

=== National Premier Leagues Victoria ===
On 6 August 2016, Thompson signed a short-term, two-game deal with National Premier Leagues Victoria team Heidelberg United.

In something of a homecoming, Thompson signed up for a full season with Murray United FC, based in Wodonga, home of his parents, ahead of the 2017 National Premier Leagues Victoria 2 season. He made his debut for Murray United as a 57th-minute substitute against Melbourne City FC NPL.

=== Racing Murcia ===
On 20 August 2019, Thompson signed a contract for fifth division Spanish side Racing Murcia. The club has high ambitions as they aim for promotion to La Liga, the top division in Spain, within five years. Thompson made his debut on 2 September 2019 coming on as a substitute in the 64th minute against CD Abarán. In a video documenting the progress of the club uploaded to SBS The World Game, it was announced that Thompson had left the club and returned home to Australia.

== International career ==
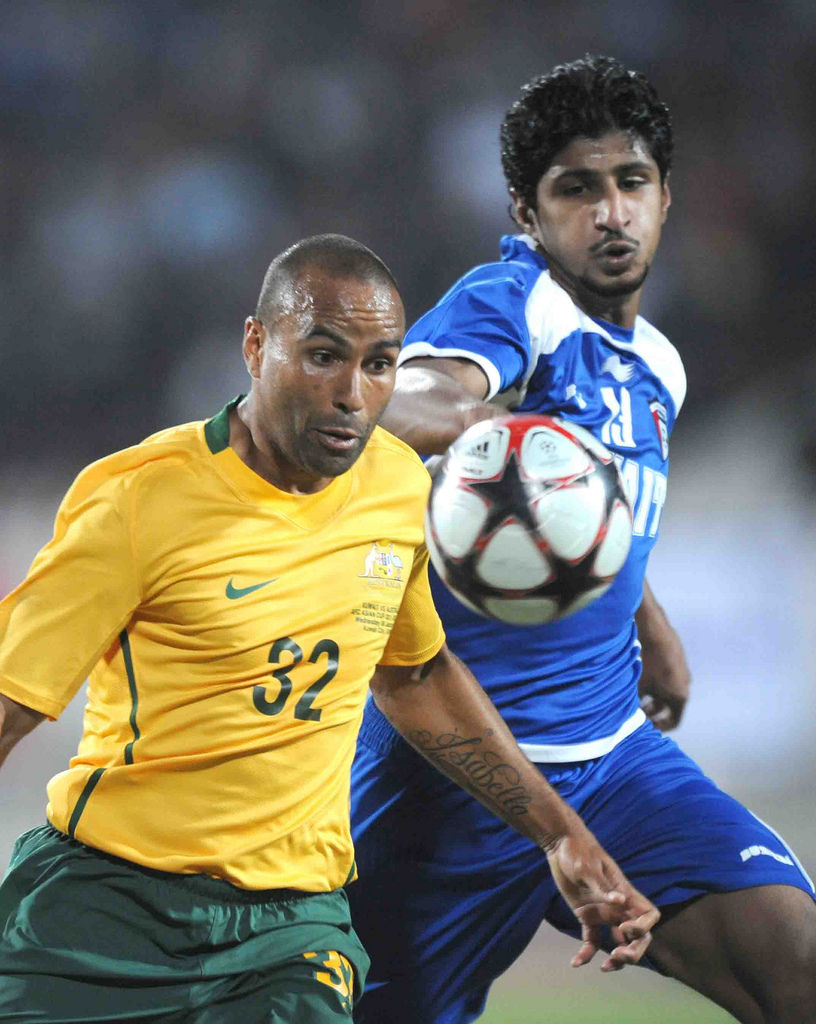
Thompson (left) playing for Australia against Kuwait in 2010

Thompson made his first international appearance for Australia on 28 February 2001 in a friendly match against Colombia. He then was included by coach Frank Farina in the squad for the 2002 FIFA World Cup qualification matches played in April 2001. On 9 April 2001, he came on as a substitute and scored his first international goal in Australia's first match against Tonga, which Australia easily won 22–0, breaking the world record for the largest win in an international match. Two days later, in the match against American Samoa, Thompson was named as starter with regular attackers either rested or omitted from the squad. Australia went on to break their own record by winning 31–0, with Thompson scoring 13 goals, breaking the world record for most goals scored in an international match. American Samoa, who had player eligibility issues, fielded a team with youth players and was not a match to Australia, even though Australia themselves were missing several star players.

A month later, Thompson was named in Australia's squad for the 2001 FIFA Confederations Cup. He made two substitute appearances in the tournament as Australia went on to achieve third place at the competition. In total, Thompson made seven international appearances in 2001, scoring an impressive 16 goals. However, after 2001, he was not called up by Farina for more than three years before earning a recall in 2004.

On 12 October 2004, he was recalled to the team and made a substitute appearance in the 2004 OFC Nations Cup final, which Australia won. Since then, Thompson was more regularly called up to the national team, although most of his appearances were as a substitute. He was also included in Australia's squad for the 2005 FIFA Confederations Cup, appearing in two matches as a substitute. In 2005, Thompson returned to Australia to play for Melbourne Victory in the inaugural A-League season. Despite not playing in Europe, he retained his place in the national team and became the only A-League based player in Australia's squad for the qualification matches against Uruguay for a berth in the 2006 FIFA World Cup. Australia eventually qualified for the 2006 World Cup. His good form for Melbourne earned Thompson a place in Australia's squad for the World Cup. He was one of three A-League based players in the squad, even though he spent the run-up to the tournament on loan at PSV Eindhoven. However, he did not receive any playing time in the tournament, as Australia was eliminated in the second round.

In 2007, Thompson was once again included in Australia's squad for a major tournament. This time, Thompson participated in the 2007 AFC Asian Cup, appearing as a substitute once, in a match against the eventual winners Iraq. In 2008, Thompson was included in Australia's under-23 squad for the 2008 Olympics as one of the three over-age players allowed in the team. National coach Pim Verbeek described Thompson's performance against Indonesia in February 2009 as "absolutely hopeless".

Thompson returned to the national team in 2012 and scored in a 3–0 win against Lebanon, his first international goal in six years. Three days later, he scored in a 2–1 loss to Jordan. His goal scoring form continued as he scored a last-gasp winner in a 2–1 victory over Iraq in a must-win 2014 World Cup qualifier. Thompson was selected in the squad to take part in East Asian Cup qualification in Hong Kong, and Thompson was crowned top-goalscorer of the 2013 East Asian Cup. On 5 November, he scored against North Korea in a 1–1 draw. Two days later, he scored one of the fastest hat-tricks in history after coming on as a substitute and scoring the three in between the 58th and 65th minutes in a 9–0 win over Guam. This meant that Thompson has scored 28 international goals, one behind the 29 of Damian Mori and 22 behind the Australian record of 50, held by Tim Cahill.

=== Goalscoring world record ===
Thompson's 13 goals broke the previous record of seven goals, which was jointly held by another Australian, Gary Cole, who scored seven goals against Fiji in the 1982 World Cup qualification on 14 August 1981, and Iranian Karim Bagheri, who also scored seven goals against Maldives in the 1998 World Cup qualification on 2 June 1997. Some sources mentioned that the previous record was 10 goals, which was achieved by Denmark's Sophus "Krølben" Nielsen in a 17–1 win against France at the 1908 Olympics and Germany's Gottfried Fuchs in a 16–0 win against Russia at the 1912 Olympics. These matches, although fully recognised by FIFA, were played by amateur players. Thompson also equaled the world record for most goals scored in a recognised senior match, set in 1885 when John Petrie scored 13 goals in Arbroath's 36–0 win over Bon Accord in a Scottish Cup tournament.

== Personal life ==
Thompson was born in Ōtorohanga, New Zealand. He is of Scottish descent and has a Papua New Guinean mother. He has three brothers and two sisters. He has two children, Isabella and Axel, and bears one tattoo on each of his inner forearms of his children's names. Archie was the official ambassador for FIFA 08 in Australia and New Zealand.

Thompson is a fan of the Melbourne Football Club in the Australian Football League.

In October 2010, his book What Doesn't Kill You Makes You Stronger was released by Melbourne University Publishing.

Thompson is currently a pundit for Paramount and Network 10's coverage of the A-League and a panellist on A-League review show A-Leagues Download.

== Career statistics ==
=== Club ===
As of 8 October 2018

Appearances and goals by club, season and competition
| Club | Season | League | | | National cup | | Continental | | Total | |
| Club | Season | Division | Apps | Goals | Apps | Goals | Apps | Goals | Apps | Goals |
|---|---|---|---|---|---|---|---|---|---|---|
| Gippsland Falcons | 1996–97 | National Soccer League | 6 | 2 | – | | – | | 6 | 2 |
| Gippsland Falcons | 1997–98 | National Soccer League | 22 | 4 | – | | – | | 22 | 4 |
| Gippsland Falcons | 1998–99 | National Soccer League | 15 | 4 | – | | – | | 15 | 4 |
| Gippsland Falcons | Total | | 43 | 10 | 0 | 0 | 0 | 0 | 43 | 10 |
| Carlton SC | 1998–99 | National Soccer League | 10 | 5 | – | | – | | 10 | 5 |
| Carlton SC | 1999–2000 | National Soccer League | 35 | 12 | – | | – | | 35 | 12 |
| Carlton SC | 2000–01 | National Soccer League | 8 | 6 | – | | – | | 8 | 6 |
| Carlton SC | Total | | 53 | 23 | 0 | 0 | 0 | 0 | 53 | 23 |
| Marconi Stallions | 2000–01 | National Soccer League | 13 | 6 | – | | – | | 13 | 6 |
| Lierse | 2001–02 | Belgian First Division | 31 | 9 | 3 | 2 | – | | 34 | 11 |
| Lierse | 2002–03 | Belgian First Division | 5 | 0 | 0 | 0 | – | | 5 | 0 |
| Lierse | 2003–04 | Belgian First Division | 25 | 4 | 2 | 1 | – | | 27 | 5 |
| Lierse | 2004–05 | Belgian First Division | 29 | 14 | 4 | 2 | – | | 33 | 16 |
| Lierse | Total | | 90 | 27 | 9 | 5 | 0 | 0 | 99 | 32 |
| PSV Eindhoven | 2005–06 | Eredivisie | 2 | 0 | – | | – | | 2 | 0 |
| Melbourne Victory | 2005–06 | A-League | 15 | 8 | 4 | 2 | – | | 19 | 10 |
| Melbourne Victory | 2006–07 | A-League | 22 | 15 | 5 | 2 | – | | 27 | 17 |
| Melbourne Victory | 2007–08 | A-League | 20 | 6 | 2 | 0 | 3 | 1 | 25 | 7 |
| Melbourne Victory | 2008–09 | A-League | 19 | 9 | 0 | 0 | – | | 19 | 9 |
| Melbourne Victory | 2009–10 | A-League | 26 | 11 | – | | 1 | 0 | 27 | 11 |
| Melbourne Victory | 2010–11 | A-League | 9 | 4 | – | | 6 | 0 | 15 | 4 |
| Melbourne Victory | 2011–12 | A-League | 27 | 7 | – | | 0 | 0 | 27 | 7 |
| Melbourne Victory | 2012–13 | A-League | 22 | 9 | – | | 0 | 0 | 22 | 9 |
| Melbourne Victory | 2013–14 | A-League | 24 | 9 | – | | 5 | 0 | 29 | 9 |
| Melbourne Victory | 2014–15 | A-League | 26 | 11 | 2 | 1 | – | | 28 | 12 |
| Melbourne Victory | 2015–16 | A-League | 14 | 1 | 2 | 0 | 8 | 1 | 24 | 2 |
| Melbourne Victory | Total | | 224 | 90 | 15 | 5 | 23 | 2 | 262 | 97 |
| Heidelberg United | 2016 | NPL Victoria | 2 | 0 | – | | – | | 2 | 0 |
| Murray United | 2017 | NPL Victoria 2 | 21 | 7 | – | | – | | 21 | 7 |
| Murray United | 2018 | NPL Victoria 2 | 5 | 0 | – | | – | | 5 | 0 |
| Murray United | Total | | 26 | 7 | 0 | 0 | 0 | 0 | 26 | 7 |
| Career total | | | 453 | 163 | 24 | 10 | 23 | 2 | 500 | 175 |

=== International ===
Appearances and goals by national team and year
| National team | Year | Apps | Goals |
|---|---|---|---|
| Australia | 2001 | 7 | 16 |
| Australia | 2002 | 0 | 0 |
| Australia | 2003 | 0 | 0 |
| Australia | 2004 | 1 | 1 |
| Australia | 2005 | 8 | 3 |
| Australia | 2006 | 7 | 1 |
| Australia | 2007 | 5 | 0 |
| Australia | 2008 | 2 | 0 |
| Australia | 2009 | 2 | 0 |
| Australia | 2010 | 1 | 0 |
| Australia | 2011 | 1 | 0 |
| Australia | 2012 | 12 | 7 |
| Australia | 2013 | 8 | 0 |
| Total | | 54 | 28 |

Scores and results list Australia's goal tally first, score column indicates score after each Thompson goal.

List of international goals scored by Archie Thompson
| No. | Date | Venue | Opponent | Score | Result | Competition | Ref. |
|---|---|---|---|---|---|---|---|
| 1 | 9 April 2001 | Coffs Harbour International Stadium, Coffs Harbour, Australia | Tonga | 18–0 | 22–0 | 2002 FIFA World Cup qualification | |
| 2 | 11 April 2001 | Coffs Harbour International Stadium, Coffs Harbour, Australia | American Samoa | 2–0 | 31–0 | 2002 FIFA World Cup qualification | |
| 3 | 11 April 2001 | Coffs Harbour International Stadium, Coffs Harbour, Australia | American Samoa | 8–0 | 31–0 | 2002 FIFA World Cup qualification | |
| 4 | 11 April 2001 | Coffs Harbour International Stadium, Coffs Harbour, Australia | American Samoa | 10–0 | 31–0 | 2002 FIFA World Cup qualification | |
| 5 | 11 April 2001 | Coffs Harbour International Stadium, Coffs Harbour, Australia | American Samoa | 11–0 | 31–0 | 2002 FIFA World Cup qualification | |
| 6 | 11 April 2001 | Coffs Harbour International Stadium, Coffs Harbour, Australia | American Samoa | 12–0 | 31–0 | 2002 FIFA World Cup qualification | |
| 7 | 11 April 2001 | Coffs Harbour International Stadium, Coffs Harbour, Australia | American Samoa | 14–0 | 31–0 | 2002 FIFA World Cup qualification | |
| 8 | 11 April 2001 | Coffs Harbour International Stadium, Coffs Harbour, Australia | American Samoa | 15–0 | 31–0 | 2002 FIFA World Cup qualification | |
| 9 | 11 April 2001 | Coffs Harbour International Stadium, Coffs Harbour, Australia | American Samoa | 16–0 | 31–0 | 2002 FIFA World Cup qualification | |
| 10 | 11 April 2001 | Coffs Harbour International Stadium, Coffs Harbour, Australia | American Samoa | 20–0 | 31–0 | 2002 FIFA World Cup qualification | |
| 11 | 11 April 2001 | Coffs Harbour International Stadium, Coffs Harbour, Australia | American Samoa | 22–0 | 31–0 | 2002 FIFA World Cup qualification | |
| 12 | 11 April 2001 | Coffs Harbour International Stadium, Coffs Harbour, Australia | American Samoa | 23–0 | 31–0 | 2002 FIFA World Cup qualification | |
| 13 | 11 April 2001 | Coffs Harbour International Stadium, Coffs Harbour, Australia | American Samoa | 29–0 | 31–0 | 2002 FIFA World Cup qualification | |
| 14 | 11 April 2001 | Coffs Harbour International Stadium, Coffs Harbour, Australia | American Samoa | 30–0 | 31–0 | 2002 FIFA World Cup qualification | |
| 15 | 16 April 2001 | Coffs Harbour International Stadium, Coffs Harbour, Australia | Samoa | 7–0 | 11–0 | 2002 FIFA World Cup qualification | |
| 16 | 16 April 2001 | Coffs Harbour International Stadium, Coffs Harbour, Australia | Samoa | 9–0 | 11–0 | 2002 FIFA World Cup qualification | |
| 17 | 12 October 2004 | Sydney Football Stadium, Sydney, Australia | Solomon Islands | 4–0 | 6–0 | 2004 OFC Nations Cup | |
| 18 | 3 September 2005 | Sydney Football Stadium, Sydney, Australia | Solomon Islands | 6–0 | 7–0 | 2006 FIFA World Cup qualification | |
| 19 | 6 September 2005 | Lawson Tama Stadium, Honiara, Solomon Islands | Solomon Islands | 1–0 | 2–1 | 2006 FIFA World Cup qualification | |
| 20 | 9 October 2005 | Craven Cottage, London, England | Jamaica | 2–0 | 5–0 | Friendly | |
| 21 | 22 February 2006 | Bahrain National Stadium, Riffa, Bahrain | Bahrain | 1–1 | 3–1 | 2007 AFC Asian Cup qualification | |
| 22 | 6 September 2012 | Tripoli Municipal Stadium, Tripoli, Lebanon | Lebanon | 3–0 | 3–0 | Friendly | |
| 23 | 11 September 2012 | King Abdullah II Stadium, Amman, Jordan | Jordan | 1–2 | 1–2 | 2014 FIFA World Cup qualification | |
| 24 | 16 October 2012 | Grand Hamad Stadium, Doha, Qatar | Iraq | 2–1 | 2–1 | 2014 FIFA World Cup qualification | |
| 25 | 5 December 2012 | Hong Kong Stadium, Causeway Bay, Hong Kong | North Korea | 1–0 | 1–1 | 2013 EAFF East Asian Cup | |
| 26 | 7 December 2012 | Hong Kong Stadium, Causeway Bay, Hong Kong | Guam | 5–0 | 9–0 | 2013 EAFF East Asian Cup | |
| 27 | 7 December 2012 | Hong Kong Stadium, Causeway Bay, Hong Kong | Guam | 6–0 | 9–0 | 2013 EAFF East Asian Cup | |
| 28 | 7 December 2012 | Hong Kong Stadium, Causeway Bay, Hong Kong | Guam | 7–0 | 9–0 | 2013 EAFF East Asian Cup | |

== Honours ==
Melbourne Victory

- A-League Championship: 2006–07, 2008–09, 2014–15

Australia

- FIFA Confederations Cup: 3rd place, 2001
- OFC Nations Cup: 2004

Individual

- A-League Golden Boot: 2005–06
- Joe Marston Medal: 2007
- Victory Medal: 2007–08, 2009–10
- A-League PFA Team of the Season: 2008–09, 2009–10, 2011–12, 2012–13
- A-League PFA Team of the Decade: 2005–2015

Records

- Most goals in an A-League match: 5
- Most Melbourne Victory appearances: 261
- Most Melbourne Victory goals: 97

== See also ==
- List of Melbourne Victory FC players
- List of foreign football players in the Netherlands
