= 2005–06 Queensland Roar FC season =

Queensland Roar FC
2005–06 season
- Chairman: John Ribot
- Manager: Miron Bleiberg
- A-League: 6th
- Pre-Season Cup: Group Stage
- World Club Qualifiers: Round 1
- Top goalscorer: Alex Brosque – 8 Goals
- Highest home attendance: 23,142 v Sydney FC
- Lowest home attendance: 8,607 v New Zealand Knights
- Average home league attendance: 14,785
- Biggest win: 5–0 v Newcastle Jets
- Biggest defeat: 1–3 v Sydney FC
Home colours	Away colours

The 2005–06 Queensland Roar season would mark the first season for the Hyundai A-League. Queensland Lions withdrew their first team from the QLD State League and entered it in the new fledgling competition as ‘The Roar’ having been accepted by Football Federation Australia to take part as the sole representative for Queensland after no other club was able to raise the required funds to participate. The Queensland Roar were previously playing in the Brisbane Premier League under the name Queensland Lions.

== Inaugural A-League squad ==
Note: Flags indicate national team as defined under FIFA eligibility rules; some limited exceptions apply. Players may hold more than one non-FIFA nationality.

No.	Pos.	Nation	Player
1	GK	AUS	Tom Willis
2	DF	AUS	Karl Dodd
3	DF	SUI	Remo Buess
4	DF	AUS	Chad Gibson (captain)
5	DF	AUS	Josh McCloughan
6	MF	AUS	Todd Gava
7	MF	KOR	Tae-Yong Shin
8	MF	AUS	Massimo Murdocca
9	FW	AUS	Michael Baird
10	FW	AUS	Royce Brownlie
11	MF	AUS	Jonathan Richter
12	MF	AUS	Jordan Simpson

No.	Pos.	Nation	Player
13	DF	AUS	Tyler Simpson
14	MF	AUS	David Williams
15	MF	AUS	Matt McKay
16	MF	KOR	Hyuk-Su Seo
17	FW	AUS	Reece Tollenaere
18	MF	AUS	Warren Moon
19	FW	AUS	Alex Brosque
20	GK	AUS	Scott Higgins
21	MF	AUS	Spase Dilevski
22	MF	URU	Osvaldo Carro
23	DF	AUS	Stuart McLaren
24	FW	BRA	Reinaldo

=== Season 2005–06 results ===
Round 1

28 August 2005
15:00 UTC+10

Queensland Roar	2–0	New Zealand Knights
Brosque 80'; Baird 86'	(Report) (Summary)

Suncorp Stadium
Attendance: 20,725
Referee: Matthew Breeze

Round 2

2 September 2005
19:30 UTC+9:30

Adelaide United	0–0	Queensland Roar
	(Report) (Summary)

Hindmarsh Stadium
Attendance: 11,029
Referee: Ben Williams

Round 3

10 September 2005
19:35 UTC+8

Perth Glory	2–1	Queensland Roar
Despotovski 54', 72'	(Report) (Summary)	Moon 76'

Members Equity Stadium
Attendance: 8,509
Referee: Simon Przydacz

Round 4

18 September 2005
15:00 UTC+10

Queensland Roar	1–1	Melbourne Victory
Baird 62'; McKay (red card) 40'	(Report) (Summary)	Allsopp 88'

Suncorp Stadium
Attendance: 15,444
Referee: Ben Williams

Round 5

23 September 2005
20:00 UTC+10

Queensland Roar	1–3	Sydney FC
Timpano 50' (o.g.)	(Report) (Summary)	Corica 5', 67'; McFlynn 68'

Suncorp Stadium
Attendance: 23,142
Referee: Matthew Breeze

Round 6

1 October 2005
19:35 UTC+10

Newcastle Jets	0–1	Queensland Roar
Carle (red card) 31'	(Report) (Summary)	Moon 68'; McKay (yellow card) 59' (yellow-red card) 80'

EnergyAustralia Stadium
Attendance: 7,436
Referee: Srebre Delovski

Round 7

7 October 2005
20:00 UTC+10

Queensland Roar	1–1	Central Coast Mariners
Seo 57'	(Report) (Summary)	Spencer 41'

Suncorp Stadium
Attendance: 13,195
Referee: Perry Mur

Round 8

16 October 2005
18:00 UTC+12

New Zealand Knights	0–2	Queensland Roar
	(Report) (Summary)	Seo 8'; Baird 57'

North Harbour Stadium
Attendance: 4,182
Referee: Simon Przydacz

Round 9

22 October 2005
19:30 UTC+10

Queensland Roar	1–2	Adelaide United
Brownlie 76'	(Report) (Summary)	Fernando 59'; Pantelis 89'

Suncorp Stadium
Attendance: 15,181
Referee: Peter O'Leary

Round 10

29 October 2005
19:30 UTC+10

Queensland Roar	0–0	Perth Glory
	(Report) (Summary)

Suncorp Stadium
Attendance: 13,685
Referee: Simon Przydacz

Round 11

4 November 2005
20:00 UTC+11

Melbourne Victory	0–1	Queensland Roar
Claeys (red card) 86'; Muscat (yellow card) 58' (yellow-red card) 61'	(Report) (Summary)	McKay 15'

Olympic Park Stadium
Attendance: 13,239
Referee: Mark Shield

Round 12

13 November 2005

Sydney FC	1–0	Queensland Roar
Zdrillic 54'	(Summary)

Sydney Football Stadium
Attendance: 13,030
Referee: Ben Williams

Round 13

20 November 2005

Queensland Roar	0–1	Newcastle Jets
	(Summary)	Thompson 34'

Suncorp Stadium
Attendance: 13,004
Referee: Mark Shield

Round 14

25 November 2005

Central Coast Mariners	2–2	Queensland Roar
Heffernan 89'; Osman 56'	(Summary)	Brosque 7' 78'; Baird (red card) 75'

Bluetongue Stadium
Attendance: 5,194
Referee: Matthew Breeze

Round 15

1 December 2005

Queensland Roar	1–1	New Zealand Knights
Brownlie 28'	(Summary)	Yeo 44'

Suncorp Stadium
Attendance: 8,607
Referee: James Lewis

Round 16

1 January 2006

Adelaide United	4–2	Queensland Roar
Rech 40' 63'; Qu 30'; Veart 29'	(Summary)	Baird 83'; Brosque 11'

Hindmarsh Stadium
Attendance: 8,426
Referee: Matthew Breeze

Round 17

7 January 2006

Perth Glory	0–2	Queensland Roar
	(Summary)	Baird 80'; Reinaldo 10'

Members Equity Stadium
Attendance: 11,087
Referee: Peter Green

Round 18

15 January 2006

Queensland Roar	0–1	Melbourne Victory
	(Summary)	Thompson 56'

Suncorp Stadium
Attendance: 12,710
Referee: Mark Shield

Round 19

21 January 2006

Queensland Roar	2–1	Sydney FC
Brosque 60' 70'	(Summary)	Petrovski 85'

Suncorp Stadium
Attendance: 13,302
Referee: Simon Przydacz

Round 20

26 January 2006

Newcastle Jets	0–5	Queensland Roar
	(Summary)	Murdocca 90'; McKay 83'; Brosque 52'; Richter 44'; Reinaldo 10'

EnergyAustralia Stadium
Attendance: 10,271
Referee: Peter O'Leary

Round 21

4 February 2006

Queensland Roar	2–2	Central Coast Mariners
Baird 60'; Brosque 3'	(Summary)	O'Sullivan 81'; Petrie 33'

Suncorp Stadium
Attendance: 13,641
Referee: Ben Williams

=== Season 2005–06 ladder ===
Pos	Team	Pld	W	D	L	GF	GA	GD	Pts	Qualification
1	Adelaide United	21	13	4	4	33	25	+8	43	Qualification for 2007 AFC Champions League group stage and Finals series
2	Sydney FC (C)	21	10	6	5	35	28	+7	36	Qualification for 2007 AFC Champions League group stage and Finals series
3	Central Coast Mariners	21	8	8	5	35	28	+7	32	Qualification for Finals series
4	Newcastle Jets	21	9	4	8	27	29	−2	31	Qualification for Finals series
5	Perth Glory	21	8	5	8	34	29	+5	29	
6	Queensland Roar	21	7	7	7	27	22	+5	28	
7	Melbourne Victory	21	7	5	9	26	24	+2	26	
8	New Zealand Knights (Note: New Zealand Knights cannot qualify for the AFC Champions League as they are not recognised as an AFC club.)	21	1	3	17	15	47	−32	6	

Source: ultimatealeague.com
Rules for classification: 1) points; 2) goal difference; 3) number of goals scored.
(C) Champions
