= List of Brisbane Roar FC players (1–24 appearances) =

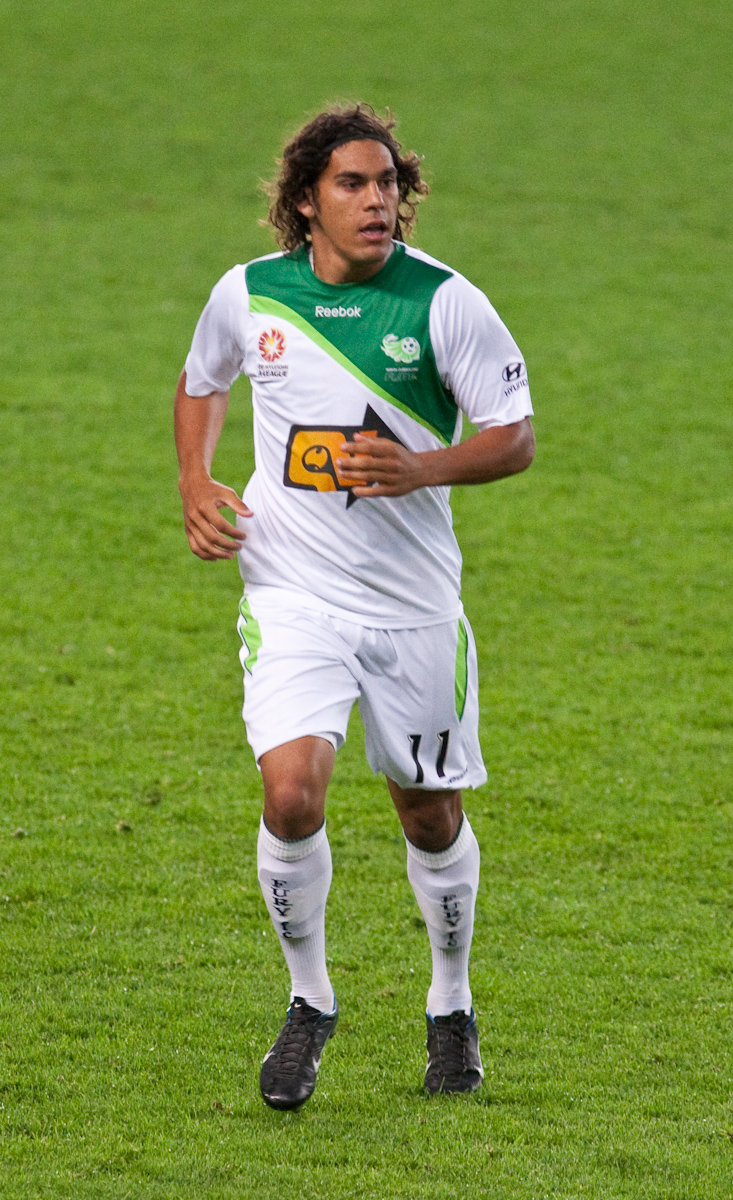
David Williams, who began his career at Brisbane Roar, made two appearances for the club.

Brisbane Roar Football Club, an association football club based in Milton, Brisbane, founded in 2005 as Queensland Roar. They became the first Queensland member admitted into the A-League Men in 2005 after a break off with other associated club Queensland Lions. The club's first team have competed in numerous nationally and internationally organised competitions, and all players who have played between 1 and 24 such matches, either as a member of the starting eleven or as a substitute, are listed below.

== Key ==
- The list is ordered first by date of debut, and then if necessary in alphabetical order.
- Appearances as a substitute are included.
- Statistics are correct up to and including the match played on 29 December 2024. Where a player left the club permanently after this date, his statistics are updated to his date of leaving.

Positions key
GK	Goalkeeper
DF	Defender
MF	Midfielder
FW	Forward

Nationality
Unless otherwise noted, the nationality of a player is determined by the country/countries which he has played for, or if said person has not played international football, their country of birth.
Position
Playing positions are listed according to the tactical formations that were employed at the time.
Club career
Club career is defined as the first and last calendar years in which the player appeared for the club in any of the competitions listed below.
Total appearances and Total goals
Total appearances and goals comprise those in the A-League Men regular season and finals series, A-League Pre-Season Challenge Cup, Australia Cup, AFC Champions League and the 2005 Australian Club World Championship Qualifying Tournament

== Players ==
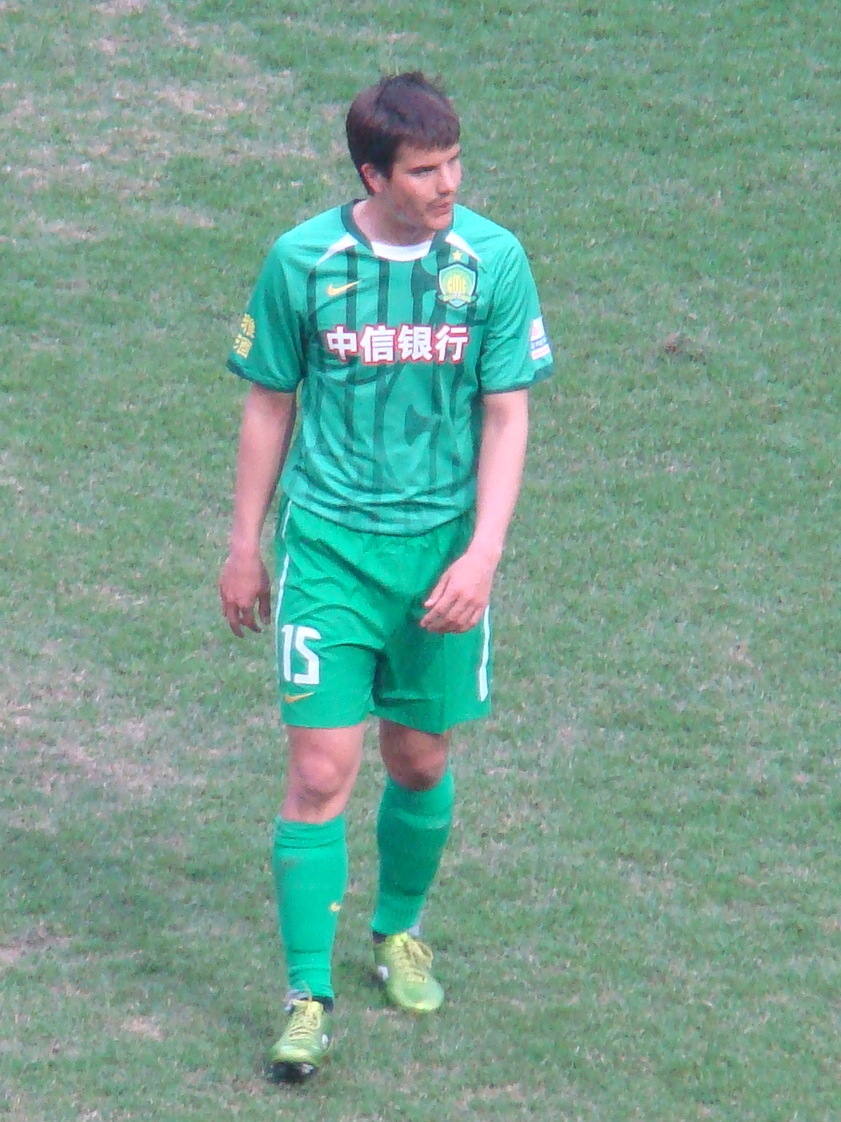
Andrija Kaluđerović joined Brisbane Roar in the summer of 2015 and made 16 appearances, scoring seven goals.

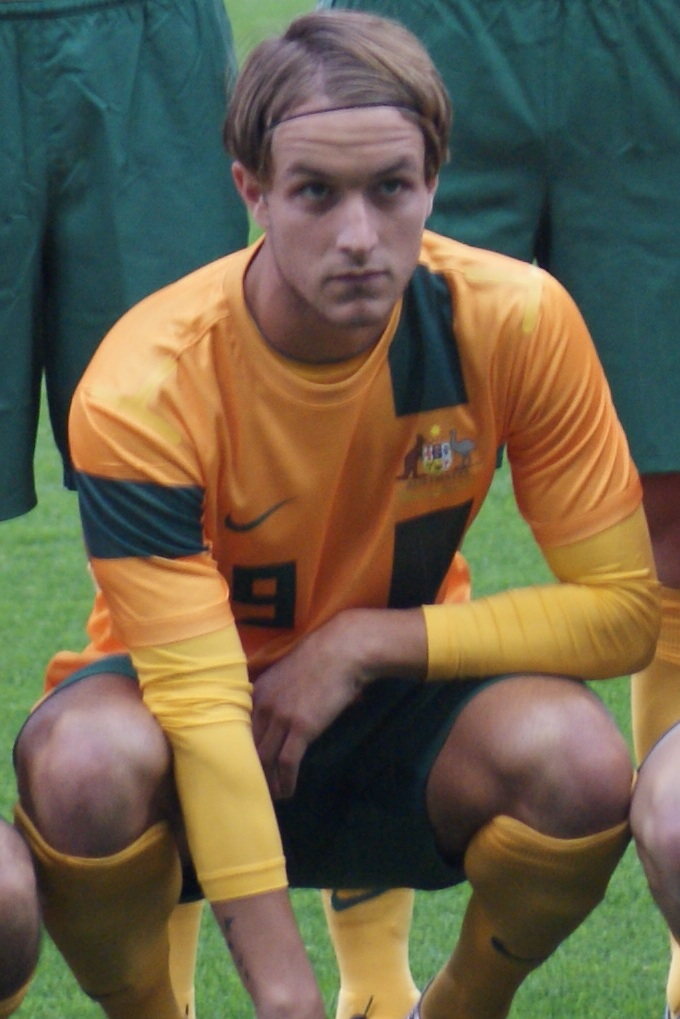
Adam Taggart scored 11 goals in 19 matches in the 2018–19 season.

Players highlighted in bold are still actively playing at Brisbane Roar

List of Brisbane Roar players with between 1 and 24 appearances
Player	Nationality	Pos	Club career	Starts	Subs	Total	Goals
Player	Nationality	Pos	Club career	Appearances			Goals
Michael Baird	Australia	FW	2005–2006	11	10	21	6
Warren Moon	Australia	FW	2005–2006	5	13	18	3
Jonti Richter	Australia	MF	2005–2006	12	9	21	1
Shin Tae-yong	South Korea	MF	2005	1	2	3	0
Tyler Simpson	Australia	DF	2005–2006	4	1	5	0
Reece Tollenaere	Australia	FW	2005–2006	2	5	7	2
Alex Brosque	Australia	FW	2005–2007	22	2	24	0
Royce Brownlie	Australia	FW	2005–2007	7	5	12	4
Todd Gava	Australia	MF	2005–2006	6	5	11	0
Scott Higgins	Australia	GK	2005–2006	8	0	8	0
Jordan Simpson	Australia	MF	2005–2006	2	4	6	0
Osvaldo Carro	Uruguay	MF	2005–2006	4	5	9	0
David Williams	Australia	FW	2006	0	2	2	0
Tim Smits	Australia	FW	2006–2007; 2008–2010	10	11	21	1
Steve Fitzsimmons	Australia	DF	2006–2007	2	3	5	0
Dario Vidosic	Australia	FW	2006–2007	11	8	19	6
Marcus Wedau	Germany	MF	2006–2007	7	4	11	0
Carl Recchia	Australia	MF	2006–2007	0	1	1	0
Damian Mori	Australia	FW	2006–2007	8	0	8	2
Chris Grossman	Australia	MF	2006–2009	14	1	15	0
Tando Velaphi	Australia	GK	2007	1	0	1	0
Márcio	Brazil	MF	2007–2008	18	6	24	4
Griffin McMaster	Australia	GK	2007–2010	22	0	22	0
David Dodd	Australia	MF	2008–2010	12	12	24	1
Isaka Cernak	Australia	MF	2008–2009	4	11	15	1
Bob Malcolm	Scotland	DF	2009–2010	11	0	11	0
Calum O'Connell	Australia	DF	2009–2010	1	0	1	0
Mario Karlovic	Australia	MF	2009–2010	2	4	6	0
Pieter Collen	Belgium	DF	2010	5	0	5	0
Matthew Ham	Australia	GK	2007–2008; 2009–2010	5	0	5	0
Steven Bryce	Costa Rica	MF	2010	2	2	4	0
Chris Bush	Australia	MF	2010–2012	0	1	1	0
Andrew Redmayne	Australia	GK	2010–2012	1	1	2	0
Kofi Danning	Australia	FW	2011–2012; 2014–2015	4	16	20	2
Issey Nakajima-Farran	Canada	FW	2011–2012	16	7	23	4
George Lambadaridis	Australia	MF	2011–2015; 2015	2	8	10	1
Do Dong-hyun	South Korea	MF	2012–2013	0	3	3	0
Yuji Takahashi	Japan	DF	2012–2013	0	4	4	0
Julius Davies	Australia	FW	2013–2014	0	2	2	0
Stefan Nijland	Netherlands	FW	2013	6	5	11	0
Kwame Yeboah	Australia	FW	2013–2014	3	9	12	2
Diogo Ferreira	Australia	MF	2013–2014	8	3	11	0
Patrick Theodore	Australia	FW	2013–2015	2	1	3	0
**Matt Acton**	Australia	GK	2013–2014; 2014–2015; 2023–	3	0	3	0
Devante Clut	Australia	MF	2014–2016	8	13	21	0
Jai Ingham	Australia	MF	2014–2015; 2019–2021	1	14	15	0
Mensur Kurtiši	North Macedonia	FW	2014–2015	5	5	10	1
Shannon Brady	Australia	FW	2014–2019	4	16	20	0
Jerome Polenz	Germany	MF	2015–2016	11	1	12	0
Andrija Kaluđerović	Serbia	MF	2015	13	3	16	7
Lachlan Jackson	Australia	DF	2014–2015	2	1	3	1
Luke Pavlou	Australia	DF	2015–2016	0	2	2	0
Abraham Yango	Australia	FW	2015–2016	0	3	3	0
Javier Hervás	Spain	MF	2015–2016	2	15	17	0
Nathan Konstandopoulos	Australia	MF	2016–2017	1	3	4	0
Joey Katebian	Australia	FW	2016–2017	2	4	6	0
Manuel Arana	Spain	FW	2016–2017	11	13	24	2
Cameron Crestani	Australia	DF	2017	5	1	6	0
Kye Rowles	Australia	DF	2016–2017	2	2	4	0
Tomislav Bilic	Australia	GK	2016–2017	0	1	1	0
Mitchell Oxborrow	Australia	MF	2017–2018	5	14	19	0
Peter Skapetis	Australia	FW	2017–2018	9	6	15	1
Corey Gameiro	Australia	FW	2017–2018	2	16	18	0
Adam Sawyer	Australia	MF	2017–2018	0	1	1	0
Daniel Leck	Australia	FW	2017–2019	10	5	15	0
Stefan Mauk	Australia	MF	2018–2019	15	2	17	2
Tobias Mikkelsen	Denmark	FW	2018–2019	11	8	19	3
Adam Taggart	Australia	FW	2018–2019	17	2	19	11
Stefan Nigro	Australia	DF	2018–2019	6	3	9	0
Aaron Reardon	Australia	DF	2019; 2023	1	5	6	0
Jay Barnett	Australia	MF	2019	0	3	3	0
Brendan White	Australia	GK	2017–2019	3	1	4	0
Izaack Powell	Australia	DF	2019–2020	4	6	10	0
Ruon Tongyik	South Sudan	DF	2019	8	0	8	0
Charles Lokolingoy	Australia	FW	2019	0	5	5	0
Eli Babalj	Australia	FW	2019	3	1	4	0
Zach Duncan	Australia	FW	2019	3	1	4	1
Jordan Courtney-Perkins	Australia	FW	2019–2021	10	7	17	0
Jake McGing	Australia	MF	2019–2020	8	2	10	0
George Mells	Australia	MF	2019	0	1	1	0
Roy O'Donovan	Ireland	FW	2019–2020	11	3	14	7
Aiden O'Neill	Australia	MF	2019–2020	14	4	18	0
Aaron Amadi-Holloway	Wales	FW	2019–2020	5	18	23	1
Max Crocombe	New Zealand	GK	2019–2020	6	0	6	0
Mirza Muratovic	Australia	FW	2019–2020	7	6	13	2
Scott McDonald	Australia	FW	2020–2021	20	3	23	9
Danny Kim	Australia	MF	2020; 2020–2021	4	4	8	0
Matthew Ridenton	Australia	MF	2020	3	2	5	1
Joe Champness	New Zealand	FW	2020–2021	16	8	24	2
Masato Kudo	Japan	FW	2021	3	11	14	1
Golgol Mebrahtu	Australia	FW	2021	3	9	12	1
Cyrus Dehmie	Australia	MF	2021–2022	4	10	14	3
Patrick Flottmann	Australia	DF	2021	0	4	4	0
Eli Adams	Australia	MF	2021–2022	4	6	10	0
Juan Lescano	Argentina	FW	2021–2022	13	9	22	7
Matti Steinmann	Germany	MF	2021–2022	14	6	20	1
Jackson Hart-Phillips	Australia	DF	2021	0	1	1	0
Nicholas Olsen	Australia	DF	2021–2022	13	9	22	0
Anton Mlinaric	Australia	DF	2021–2022	8	6	14	0
**Samuel Klein**	Australia	MF	2022; 2024–	0	4	4	0
Ryo Wada	Japan	FW	2022	4	0	4	0
Connor Chapman	Australia	DF	2022–2023	18	4	22	1
Charlie Austin	England	FW	2022	11	0	11	4
Brandon McMorrow	Australia	MF	2022	0	1	1	0
Joe Knowles	Australia	FW	2022–2023	13	8	21	1
Ayom Majok	South Sudan	FW	2023–2024	1	15	16	1
Marcel Canadi	Austria	MF	2023	0	4	4	0
Noah Smith	Australia	DF	2023	4	2	6	0
Stefan Šćepović	Serbia	FW	2023	9	1	10	1
**Quinn MacNicol**	Australia	MF	2023–	0	7	7	1
James Nikolovski	Australia	DF	2023–2024	3	5	8	0
Jonas Markovski	Australia	FW	2023–2024	2	16	18	3
**Rylan Brownlie**	Australia	FW	2023–	0	10	10	1
Shae Cahill	Australia	MF	2023–2024	0	2	2	0
**Ryan Lethlean**	Australia	DF	2024–	2	0	2	0
**Keegan Jelacic**	Australia	MF	2024–	18	1	19	2
Marco Rojas	New Zealand	FW	2024	3	5	8	2
**Ben Warland**	Australia	DF	2024–	9	0	9	0
**Marcus Ferkranus**	United States of America	DF	2024–	1	0	1	0
**Adam Zimarino**	Australia	FW	2024–	2	3	5	1
**Néicer Acosta**	Ecuador	FW	2024–	1	3	4	0
**Hosine Bility**	Australia	DF	2024–	4	3	7	0
**Ivan Ozzi**	Australia	FW	2024–	0	1	1	0
**Walid Shour**	Lebanon	MF	2024–	7	2	9	0
**Rafael Struick**	Indonesia	FW	2024–	1	6	7	1
**Harry Van Der Saag**	Australia	DF	2024–	6	3	9	0
**Jacob Brazete**	Australia	FW	2024–	1	5	6	0
**Lucas Herrington**	Australia	DF	2024–	3	0	3	0
