= 2005 A-League Pre-season Challenge Cup =

Tournament details
- Country: Australia; New Zealand
- Dates: 22 July – 20 August
- Teams: 8

Final positions
- Champions: Central Coast Mariners (1st title)
- Runners-up: Perth Glory

Tournament statistics
- Matches played: 15
- Goals scored: 34 (2.27 per match)
- Attendance: 76,203 (5,080 per match)

The 2005 A-League Pre-season Challenge Cup was the first edition of the A-League Pre-season Challenge Cup, played in the lead-up to the inaugural season of the A-League. The competition involved all eight A-League clubs. The competition was won by the Central Coast Mariners, who beat Perth Glory 1–0 in the final.

== Group stage ==
=== Group A ===
Pos	Team	Pld	W	D	L	GF	GA	GD	Pts	Qualification or relegation
1	Melbourne Victory	3	1	2	0	2	1	+1	5	Advance to semi-finals
2	Perth Glory	3	1	1	1	4	4	0	4	Advance to semi-finals
3	Adelaide United	3	0	3	0	3	3	0	3	
4	Newcastle Jets	3	0	2	1	3	4	−1	2	

22 July 2005

Newcastle Jets	1–1	Melbourne Victory
Deans 28'	Summary	Thompson 85'

Newcastle International Sports Centre, Newcastle
Attendance: 1,864
Referee: James Lewis (Australia)
22 July 2005

Adelaide United	2–2	Perth Glory
Aloisi 54'; Valkanis 62'	Report	Valkanis 29' (o.g.); Despotovski 52'

Hindmarsh Stadium, Adelaide
Attendance: 5,263
Referee: Craig Zetter

29 July 2005

Adelaide United	1–1	Newcastle Jets
Valkanis 74'	Report	Johnson 79'

Hindmarsh Stadium, Adelaide
Attendance: 6,750
Referee: Simon Przydacz
30 July 2005

Melbourne Victory	1–0	Perth Glory
Thompson 60'	Report

Olympic Park Stadium, Melbourne
Attendance: 4,528
Referee: Peter Green

5 August 2005

Melbourne Victory	0–0	Adelaide United
	Report

Olympic Park Stadium, Melbourne
Attendance: 4,687
Referee: Perry Mur
6 August 2005

Perth Glory	2–1	Newcastle Jets
Despotovski 12', 61'	Report	Thompson 29'

Perth Oval, Perth
Attendance: 7,089
Referee: Angelo Nardi

=== Group B ===
Pos	Team	Pld	W	D	L	GF	GA	GD	Pts	Qualification or relegation
1	Sydney FC	3	2	1	0	5	1	+4	7	Advance to semi-finals
2	Central Coast Mariners	3	2	0	1	4	3	+1	6	Advance to semi-finals
3	Queensland Roar	3	1	1	1	6	3	+3	4	
4	New Zealand Knights	3	0	0	3	1	9	−8	0	

23 July 2005

Central Coast Mariners	3–1	Queensland Roar
Mrdja 22', 40', 59'	Report	Tollenaere 29'

Central Coast Stadium, Gosford
Attendance: 4,247
Referee: Strebre Delovski
24 July 2005

Sydney FC	3–1	New Zealand Knights
Yorke 25' (pen.); Petrovski 45', 72'	Report	Fitzsimmons 83'

Sydney Football Stadium, Sydney
Attendance: 8,714
Referee: Ben Williams

30 July 2005

New Zealand Knights	0–5	Queensland Roar
	Report	Brownlie 8', 9'; Tollenaere 82'; Moon 90'; Murdocca 90'

North Harbour Stadium, Auckland
Attendance: 3,397
Referee: Peter O'Leary
30 July 2005

Central Coast Mariners	0–2	Sydney FC
	Report	Corica 57'; Petrovski 79'

Central Coast Stadium, Gosford
Attendance: 8,362
Referee: Matthew Breeze

6 August 2005

New Zealand Knights	0–1	Central Coast Mariners
	Report	Brown 5'

North Harbour Stadium, Auckland
Attendance: 2,269
Referee: Neil Fox
6 August 2005

Queensland Roar	0–0	Sydney FC
	Report

Barlow Park, Cairns
Attendance: 4,500
Referee: Mark Shield

== Knockout stage ==
=== Semi-finals ===
12 August 2005

Melbourne Victory	1–3	Central Coast Mariners
Byrnes 31'	Summary	Pondeljak 39' (pen.), 53'; Brown 66'

Olympic Park Stadium, Melbourne
Attendance: 4,500
Referee: Mark Shield (Australia)
14 August 2005

Sydney FC	0–1	Perth Glory
	Summary	Ward 90'

Sydney Football Stadium, Sydney
Attendance: 3,424
Referee: Ben Williams (Australia)

=== Final ===
20 August 2005

Central Coast Mariners	1–0	Perth Glory
Petrie 39'	Report

Central Coast Stadium, Gosford
Attendance: 6,609
Referee: Matthew Breeze (Australia)

== Top scorers ==
Position	Player	Club	Goals
1	(Australia) Nik Mrdja	Central Coast Mariners	3
1	(Australia) Bobby Despotovski	Perth Glory	3
1	(Australia) Sasho Petrovski	Sydney FC	3
4	(Australia) Michael Valkanis	Adelaide United	2
4	(Australia) Damien Brown	Central Coast Mariners	2
4	(Australia) Tom Pondeljak	Central Coast Mariners	2
4	(Australia) Archie Thompson	Melbourne Victory	2
4	(Australia) Royce Brownlie	Queensland Roar	2
4	(Australia) Reece Tollenaere	Queensland Roar	2
