= 2005–06 A-League =

29th season of top-tier soccer league in Australia

A-League
- Season: 2005–06
- Dates: 26 August 2005 – 5 March 2006
- Champions: Sydney FC (1st title)
- Premiers: Adelaide United (1st title)
- Champions League: Sydney FC; Adelaide United
- Matches: 84
- Goals: 232 (2.76 per match)
- Top goalscorer: Alex Brosque; Bobby Despotovski; Archie Thompson; Stewart Petrie (8 goals)
- Best goalkeeper: Clint Bolton
- Biggest home win: Melbourne Victory 5–0 Sydney FC (16 October 2005)
- Biggest away win: Newcastle Jets 0–5 Queensland Roar (26 January 2006)
- Highest attendance: 25,557
- Lowest attendance: 1,922
- Average attendance: 10,955

The 2005–06 A-League was the 29th season of top-flight soccer in Australia, and the inaugural season of the A-League. After over 12 months without a national professional club competition since the close of the 2003–04 National Soccer League season, the first match in the A-League was played on 26 August 2005. The competition was made up of a triple round robin league stage before a championship playoff featuring the top four teams.

Of the eight participants, four came from the National Soccer League (1977–2004): Perth Glory (established 1995), New Zealand Knights (1999), Newcastle Jets (2000) and Adelaide United (2003). New Zealand Knights had previously entered the NSL as the Auckland Football Kingz, but were significantly restructured and have a vastly different playing roster. Queensland Roar previously competed in the NSL from 1977 to 1988 and had competed in the Queensland State League since then as Brisbane Lions.

Adelaide United were named Premiers after finishing the season seven points clear at the top of the league. The first A-League Grand Final took place on 5 March 2006, with Sydney FC becoming the league's inaugural Champions, defeating the Central Coast Mariners 1–0.

== Clubs ==

| Team | City | Home Ground | Capacity |
|---|---|---|---|
| Adelaide United | Adelaide | Hindmarsh Stadium | 17,000 |
| Central Coast Mariners | Gosford | Bluetongue Stadium | 20,119 |
| Melbourne Victory | Melbourne | Olympic Park Stadium | 18,500 |
| Newcastle Jets | Newcastle | Energy Australia Stadium | 26,164 |
| New Zealand Knights | Auckland | North Harbour Stadium | 25,000 |
| Perth Glory | Perth | nib Stadium | 20,500 |
| Queensland Roar | Brisbane | Suncorp Stadium | 52,500 |
| Sydney FC | Sydney | Aussie Stadium | 42,500 |

=== Foreign players ===
| Club | Visa 1 | Visa 2 | Visa 3 | Visa 4 | Non-Visa foreigner(s) | Former player(s) |
|---|---|---|---|---|---|---|
| Adelaide United | (Brazil) Fernando Rech | (China) Qu Shengqing | | | | |
| Central Coast Mariners | (Germany) André Gumprecht | (Republic of Ireland) Wayne O'Sullivan | (Scotland) Stewart Petrie | | (Malta) John Hutchinson^{2} (Scotland) Ian Ferguson^{3} | |
| Melbourne Victory | (Austria) Richard Kitzbichler | (Belgium) Geoffrey Claeys | | | | |
| New Zealand Knights | (China) Zhang Xiaobin | (England) Darren Bazeley | (England) Ben Collett | (England) Neil Emblen | (China) Li Yan^{3} (England) Ronnie Bull^{3} (Republic of Ireland) Sean Devine^{1} (Japan) Naoki Imaya^{3} (Netherlands) Frank van Eijs^{3} | (England) Simon Yeo (New Zealand) Danny Hay |
| Newcastle Jets | (England) Guy Bates | (Uruguay) Mateo Corbo | | | (New Zealand) Vaughan Coveny^{1} | |
| Perth Glory | (England) Steve McMahon | (Japan) Hiroyuki Ishida | (New Zealand) Danny Hay | (Solomon Islands) Henry Fa'arodo | (England) Stuart Young^{1} (Serbia and Montenegro) Milan Jovanić^{3} | (England) Brian Deane |
| Queensland Roar | (Brazil) Reinaldo | (Switzerland) Remo Buess | (Uruguay) Osvaldo Carro | | (South Korea) Seo Hyuk-su^{1} | |
| Sydney FC | (Northern Ireland) Terry McFlynn | (Trinidad and Tobago) Dwight Yorke | (United States) Alejandro Salazar | | | (Japan) Kazuyoshi Miura^{4} |

The following do not fill a Visa position:
^{1}Those players who were born and started their professional career abroad but have since gained Australian Residency (and New Zealand Residency, in the case of New Zealand Knights);
^{2}Australian residents (and New Zealand residents, in the case of New Zealand Knights) who have chosen to represent another national team;
^{3}Injury Replacement Players, or National Team Replacement Players;
^{4}Guest Players (eligible to play a maximum of ten games)

=== Salary cap exemptions and captains ===
| Club | Marquee | Captain | Vice-Captain |
|---|---|---|---|
| Adelaide United | (China) Qu Shengqing | (Australia) Ross Aloisi | None |
| Central Coast Mariners | None | (Australia) Noel Spencer | None |
| Melbourne Victory | (Australia) Archie Thompson | (Australia) Kevin Muscat | None |
| New Zealand Knights | None | (New Zealand) Danny Hay (England) Darren Bazeley (Note: Bazeley replaced Hay as captain mid-season, after they released Hay on 23 December 2005.) | None |
| Newcastle Jets | (Australia) Ned Zelic | (Australia) Ned Zelic | None |
| Perth Glory | (England) Brian Deane (Note: Deane's contract was mutually terminated part-way through his marquee deal and he left mid-season.) | (Australia) Jamie Harnwell | None |
| Queensland Roar | None | (Australia) Chad Gibson | None |
| Sydney FC | (Trinidad and Tobago) Dwight Yorke | (Australia) Mark Rudan | None |

== Preliminary Competitions ==
Two competitions were held prior to the start of the A-League season.

=== Oceania Club Championship Qualification ===
This three-round competition was held in May 2005 to determine Australia's qualifier for the 2005 season of the Oceania Club Championship. It consisted of all Australian A-League clubs (i.e. all clubs except for the New Zealand Knights) and granted Perth Glory – the reigning NSL champions – a bye into the semi-finals.

Round 1 (7 May)
Sydney FC | 3
Queensland Roar | 0
Central Coast Mariners (p) | 0 (4)
Newcastle Jets | 0 (2)
Adelaide United (p) | 0 (4)
Melbourne Victory | 0 (1)

Semi-finals (11 May)
Perth Glory | 1
Sydney FC | 2
Central Coast Mariners | 4
Adelaide United | 0

Finals (15 May)
Sydney FC | 1
Central Coast Mariners | 0

Sydney FC qualified for and subsequently won the 2005 Oceania Club Championship entitling it to a place in the 2005 FIFA Club World Championship to be played in Tokyo.

=== Pre-Season Challenge Cup ===
The inaugural pre-season cup was held in July and August in the lead up to the start of the A-League season. The competition featured a group stage and a knockout stage. Commentators did not give much weight to the competition as a guide for performance during the season proper, as injuries or club strategic policy ruled that many teams did not use their best players and often used experimental tactics.

==== Group stage ====
Group A
| Pos | Team | Pld | W | D | L | GF | GA | GD | Pts | Qualification |
|---|---|---|---|---|---|---|---|---|---|---|
| 1 | Melbourne Victory | 3 | 1 | 2 | 0 | 2 | 1 | +1 | 5 | 2005–06 Pre-Season Cup Semi-finals |
| 2 | Perth Glory | 3 | 1 | 1 | 1 | 4 | 4 | 0 | 4 | 2005–06 Pre-Season Cup Semi-finals |
| 3 | Adelaide United | 3 | 0 | 3 | 0 | 3 | 3 | 0 | 3 | |
| 4 | Newcastle Jets | 3 | 0 | 2 | 1 | 3 | 4 | −1 | 2 | |

Group B
| Pos | Team | Pld | W | D | L | GF | GA | GD | Pts | Qualification |
|---|---|---|---|---|---|---|---|---|---|---|
| 1 | Sydney FC | 3 | 2 | 1 | 0 | 5 | 1 | +4 | 7 | 2005–06 Pre-Season Cup Semi-finals |
| 2 | Central Coast Mariners | 3 | 2 | 0 | 1 | 4 | 3 | +1 | 6 | 2005–06 Pre-Season Cup Semi-finals |
| 3 | Queensland Roar | 3 | 1 | 1 | 1 | 6 | 3 | +3 | 4 | |
| 4 | New Zealand Knights | 3 | 0 | 0 | 3 | 1 | 9 | −8 | 0 | |

==== Finals ====
Semi-finals
12 August
Melbourne Victory | 1
Central Coast Mariners | 3
14 August
Sydney FC | 0
Perth Glory | 1

Final
21 August
Central Coast Mariners | 1
Perth Glory | 0

The Central Coast Mariners were the inaugural Pre-season Challenge Cup winners.

== Regular season ==
The A-League season commenced on 26 August 2005 with two Friday night fixtures. Games each round were held throughout the weekend, though certain rounds also featured Thursday night games. As there was no concurrent cup competition, midweek fixtures were uncommon unless they were held on Australian public holidays. A three-week break was also scheduled in December to coincide with the 2005 FIFA Club World Cup in Tokyo.

=== League table ===
| Pos | Team | Pld | W | D | L | GF | GA | GD | Pts | Qualification |
|---|---|---|---|---|---|---|---|---|---|---|
| 1 | Adelaide United | 21 | 13 | 4 | 4 | 33 | 25 | +8 | 43 | Qualification for 2007 AFC Champions League group stage and Finals series |
| 2 | Sydney FC (C) | 21 | 10 | 6 | 5 | 35 | 28 | +7 | 36 | Qualification for 2007 AFC Champions League group stage and Finals series |
| 3 | Central Coast Mariners | 21 | 8 | 8 | 5 | 35 | 28 | +7 | 32 | Qualification for Finals series |
| 4 | Newcastle Jets | 21 | 9 | 4 | 8 | 27 | 29 | −2 | 31 | Qualification for Finals series |
| 5 | Perth Glory | 21 | 8 | 5 | 8 | 34 | 29 | +5 | 29 | |
| 6 | Queensland Roar | 21 | 7 | 7 | 7 | 27 | 22 | +5 | 28 | |
| 7 | Melbourne Victory | 21 | 7 | 5 | 9 | 26 | 24 | +2 | 26 | |
| 8 | New Zealand Knights (Note: New Zealand Knights cannot qualify for the AFC Champions League as they are not recognised as an AFC club.) | 21 | 1 | 3 | 17 | 15 | 47 | −32 | 6 | |

Source: ultimatealeague.com
Rules for classification: 1) points; 2) goal difference; 3) number of goals scored.
(C) Champions

=== Results ===
==== Round 1 ====
| 26 August 2005 | Perth Glory | 0–1 | Central Coast Mariners | Members Equity Stadium, Perth |
| 20:00 UTC+8 | | Report; Summary | Spencer 66' | Attendance: 11,113; Referee: Ben Williams |

| 26 August 2005 | Newcastle Jets | 0–1 | Adelaide United | EnergyAustralia Stadium, Newcastle |
| 20:00 UTC+10 | | Report; Summary | Veart 19' | Attendance: 13,160; Referee: (New Zealand) Peter O'Leary |

| 28 August 2005 | Queensland Roar | 2–0 | New Zealand Knights | Suncorp Stadium, Brisbane |
| 15:00 UTC+10 | Brosque 80'; Baird 86' | Report; Summary | | Attendance: 20,725; Referee: Matthew Breeze |

| 28 August 2005 | Sydney FC | 1–1 | Melbourne Victory | Aussie Stadium, Sydney |
| 17:00 UTC+10 | Yorke 44' | Report; Summary | Thompson 73' | Attendance: 25,208; Referee: Mark Shield |

==== Round 2 ====
| 2 September 2005 | Adelaide United | 0–0 | Queensland Roar | Hindmarsh Stadium, Adelaide |
| 19:30 UTC+9:30 | | Report; Summary | | Attendance: 11,029; Referee: Ben Williams |

| 2 September 2005 | New Zealand Knights | 1–3 | Sydney FC | North Harbour Stadium, Auckland |
| 20:00 UTC+12 | Rose 69' | Report; Summary | Rudan 25'; Bingley 73'; Middleby 90+4' | Attendance: 9,827; Referee: (New Zealand) Peter O'Leary |

| 4 September 2005 | Central Coast Mariners | 1–1 | Newcastle Jets | Bluetongue Stadium, Gosford |
| 15:00 UTC+10 | Petrie 69' | Report; Summary | Milicic 25' | Attendance: 5,917; Referee: Mark Shield |

| 4 September 2005 | Melbourne Victory | 2–2 | Perth Glory | Olympic Park Stadium, Melbourne |
| 17:00 UTC+10 | Kitzbichler 11'; Muscat 85' (pen.) | Report; Summary | Caceres 40'; Despotovski 56' | Attendance: 17,960; Referee: Matthew Breeze |

==== Round 3 ====
| 9 September 2005 | Adelaide United | 1–0 | Melbourne Victory | Hindmarsh Stadium, Adelaide |
| 19:30 UTC+9:30 | Brain 1' | Report; Summary | | Attendance: 8,785; Referee: Peter O'Leary |

| 10 September 2005 | Perth Glory | 2–1 | Queensland Roar | Members Equity Stadium, Perth |
| 19:35 UTC+8 | Despotovski 54', 72' | Report; Summary | Moon 76' | Attendance: 8,509; Referee: Simon Przydacz |

| 10 September 2005 | Central Coast Mariners | 0–2 | New Zealand Knights | Bluetongue Stadium, Gosford |
| 19:35 UTC+10 | | Report; Summary | Yeo 69'; Devine 80' | Attendance: 5,261; Referee: Ben Williams |

| 11 September 2005 | Newcastle Jets | 2–1 | Sydney FC | EnergyAustralia Stadium, Newcastle |
| 17:00 UTC+10 | Milicic 6'; Johnson 18' | Report; Summary | Yorke 78' | Attendance: 9,127; Referee: Matthew Breeze |

==== Round 4 ====
| 16 September 2005 | Sydney FC | 2–3 | Central Coast Mariners | Aussie Stadium, Sydney |
| 20:00 UTC+10 | Packer 13'; Yorke 72' | Report; Summary | Petrie 20' (pen.); Gumprecht 35'; Spencer 90+1' | Attendance: 15,614; Referee: (New Zealand) Peter O'Leary |

| 17 September 2005 | Perth Glory | 1–2 | Adelaide United | Members Equity Stadium, Perth |
| 19:35 UTC+8 | Valkanis 20' (o.g.) | Report; Summary | Aloisi 32'; Qu 65' | Attendance: 8,052; Referee: Matthew Breeze |

| 18 September 2005 | Queensland Roar | 1–1 | Melbourne Victory | Suncorp Stadium, Brisbane |
| 15:00 UTC+10 | Baird 62' | Report; Summary | Allsopp 88' | Attendance: 15,444; Referee: Ben Williams |

| 18 September 2005 | Newcastle Jets | 4–0 | New Zealand Knights | EnergyAustralia Stadium, Newcastle |
| 17:00 UTC+10 | Haliti 12'; Thompson 26'; Musialik 37'; Carle 70' (pen.) | Report; Summary | | Attendance: 7,495; Referee: Simon Przydacz |

==== Round 5 ====
| 22 September 2005 | New Zealand Knights | 0–1 | Perth Glory | North Harbour Stadium, Auckland |
| 20:00 UTC+12 | | Report; Summary | Harnwell 68' | Attendance: 4,138; Referee: Neil Fox |

| 23 September 2005 | Queensland Roar | 1–3 | Sydney FC | Suncorp Stadium, Brisbane |
| 20:00 UTC+10 | Timpano 50' (o.g.) | Report; Summary | Corica 5', 67'; McFlynn 68' | Attendance: 23,142; Referee: Matthew Breeze |

| 25 September 2005 | Melbourne Victory | 1–0 | Newcastle Jets | Olympic Park Stadium, Melbourne |
| 17:00 UTC+10 | Thompson 68' | Report; Summary | | Attendance: 13,831; Referee: Craig Zetter |

| 25 September 2005 | Adelaide United | 1–1 | Central Coast Mariners | Hindmarsh Stadium, Adelaide |
| 17:00 UTC+9:30 | Valkanis 34' | Report; Summary | Kwasnik 19' | Attendance: 7,013; Referee: Angelo Nardi |

==== Round 6 ====
| 30 September 2005 | Central Coast Mariners | 1–2 | Melbourne Victory | Bluetongue Stadium, Gosford |
| 20:00 UTC+10 | Heffernan 33' | Report; Summary | Thompson 73'; Leijer 81' | Attendance: 9,313; Referee: Ben Williams |

| 1 October 2005 | Newcastle Jets | 0–1 | Queensland Roar | EnergyAustralia Stadium, Newcastle |
| 19:35 UTC+10 | | Report; Summary | Moon 68' | Attendance: 7,436; Referee: Strebre Delovski |

| 1 October 2005 | Perth Glory | 1–2 | Sydney FC | Members Equity Stadium, Perth |
| 19:35 UTC+8 | Despotovski 40' | Report; Summary | Petrovski 48'; Yorke 65' | Attendance: 13,157; Referee: Matthew Breeze |

| 2 October 2005 | New Zealand Knights | 1–2 | Adelaide United | North Harbour Stadium, Auckland |
| 18:00 UTC+12 | Yeo 44' | Report; Summary | Dodd 34'; Qu 81' | Attendance: 3,558; Referee: (New Zealand) Peter O'Leary |

==== Round 7 ====
| 7 October 2005 | Queensland Roar | 1–1 | Central Coast Mariners | Suncorp Stadium, Brisbane |
| 20:00 UTC+10 | Seo 57' | Report; Summary | Spencer 41' | Attendance: 13,195; Referee: Perry Mur |

| 8 October 2005 | Newcastle Jets | 1–5 | Perth Glory | EnergyAustralia Stadium, Newcastle |
| 19:30 UTC+10 | Parisi 72' | Report; Summary | Mori 33', 62'; Harnwell 46'; Despotovski 52'; Sekulovski 80' | Attendance: 5,868; Referee: James Lewis |

| 9 October 2005 | Sydney FC | 2–1 | Adelaide United | Aussie Stadium, Sydney |
| 17:00 UTC+10 | Carney 54'; Petrovski 88' | Report; Summary | Valkanis 51' | Attendance: 18,276; Referee: Mark Shield |

| 10 October 2005 | Melbourne Victory | 3–0 | New Zealand Knights | Olympic Park Stadium, Melbourne |
| 19:00 UTC+10 | Kitzbichler 23'; Muscat 62'; Diaco 64' | Report; Summary | | Attendance: 11,010; Referee: Peter Green |

==== Round 8 ====
| 14 October 2005 | Adelaide United | 2–4 | Newcastle Jets | Hindmarsh Stadium, Adelaide |
| 19:30 UTC+9:30 | Valkanis 38'; Corbo 67' (o.g.) | Report; Summary | Kemp 12' (o.g.); Carle 22', 89'; Zelic 68' | Attendance: 13,182; Referee: Mark Shield |

| 16 October 2005 | Melbourne Victory | 5–0 | Sydney FC | Olympic Park Stadium, Melbourne |
| 13:00 UTC+10 | Kitzbichler 34'; Muscat 53' (pen.), 78' (pen.); Thompson 57', 69' | Report; Summary | | Attendance: 18,206; Referee: Matthew Breeze |

| 16 October 2005 | Central Coast Mariners | 4–0 | Perth Glory | Bluetongue Stadium, Gosford |
| 17:00 UTC+10 | Petrie 14', 48'; Heffernan 85'; Spencer 90+3' | Report; Summary | | Attendance: 6,494; Referee: Ben Williams |

| 16 October 2005 | New Zealand Knights | 0–2 | Queensland Roar | North Harbour Stadium, Auckland |
| 18:00 UTC+12 | | Report; Summary | Seo 8'; Baird 57' | Attendance: 4,182; Referee: Simon Przydacz |

==== Round 9 ====
| 21 October 2005 | Sydney FC | 2–0 | New Zealand Knights | Aussie Stadium, Sydney |
| 20:00 UTC+10 | Petrovski 10'; Carney 30' | Report; Summary | | Attendance: 11,836; Referee: Ben Williams |

| 22 October 2005 | Queensland Roar | 1–2 | Adelaide United | Suncorp Stadium, Brisbane |
| 19:30 UTC+10 | Brownlie 76' | Report; Summary | Fernando 59'; Pantelis 89' | Attendance: 15,181; Referee: (New Zealand) Peter O'Leary |

| 23 October 2005 | Newcastle Jets | 1–0 | Central Coast Mariners | Energy Australia Stadium |
| 17:00 UTC+10 | Parisi 88' | Report; Summary | | Attendance: 9,371; Referee: Matthew Breeze |

| 23 October 2005 | Perth Glory | 2–1 | Melbourne Victory | Members Equity Stadium, Perth |
| 17:00 UTC+8 | Deane 22'; Sekulovski 55' | Report; Summary | Thompson 39' | Attendance: 12,312; Referee: Mark Shield |

==== Round 10 ====
| 28 October 2005 | Melbourne Victory | 0–1 | Adelaide United | Olympic Park Stadium, Melbourne |
| 20:00 UTC+10 | | Report; Summary | Veart 83' | Attendance: 16,201; Referee: Matthew Breeze |

| 29 October 2005 | Queensland Roar | 0–0 | Perth Glory | Suncorp Stadium, Brisbane |
| 19:30 UTC+10 | | Report; Summary | | Attendance: 13,685; Referee: Simon Przydacz |

| 29 October 2005 | New Zealand Knights | 1–3 | Central Coast Mariners | North Harbour Stadium, Auckland |
| 20:00 UTC+12 | Yeo 7' (pen.) | Report; Summary | Heffernan 4'; Petrie 49', 72' (pen.) | Attendance: 2,583; Referee: Neil Fox |

| 30 October 2005 | Sydney FC | 1–1 | Newcastle Jets | Aussie Stadium, Sydney |
| 17:00 UTC+10 | Carney 73' | Report; Summary | Milicic 77' | Attendance: 9,132; Referee: Mark Shield |

==== Round 11 ====
| 4 November 2005 | New Zealand Knights | 2–4 | Newcastle Jets | North Harbour Stadium, Auckland |
| 20:00 UTC+13 | Brockie 71', 77' | Report; Summary | Milicic 18', 28', 56'; Thompson 21' | Attendance: 2,561; Referee: Matthew Breeze |

| 4 November 2005 | Melbourne Victory | 0–1 | Queensland Roar | Olympic Park Stadium, Melbourne |
| 20:00 UTC+11 | | Report; Summary | McKay 15' | Attendance: 13,239; Referee: Mark Shield |

| 5 November 2005 | Central Coast Mariners | 1–5 | Sydney FC | Bluetongue Stadium, Gosford |
| 20:00 UTC+11 | Hutchinson 40' | Report; Summary | Yorke 9' (pen.); Talay 14'; Petrovski 23', 68', 83' | Attendance: 10,529; Referee: Simon Przydacz |

| 6 November 2005 | Adelaide United | 2–4 | Perth Glory | Hindmarsh Stadium, Adelaide |
| 16:30 UTC+10:30 | Veart 13' (pen.); Rees 53' | Report; Summary | Mori 9', 34', 45+1'; Despotovski 39' (pen.) | Attendance: 10,868; Referee: Ben Williams |

==== Round 12 ====
| 11 November 2005 | Perth Glory | 3–0 | New Zealand Knights | Members Equity Stadium, Perth |
| 19:00 UTC+8 | Ward 69'; Sekulovski 25'; Despotovski 12' | | | Attendance: 9,667; Referee: Craig Zetter |

| 11 November 2005 | Melbourne Victory | 0–0 | Newcastle Jets | Olympic Park Stadium, Melbourne |
| 20:00 UTC+11 | | | | Attendance: 12,407; Referee: Simon Przydacz |

| 13 November 2005 | Central Coast Mariners | 1–2 | Adelaide United | Bluetongue Stadium, Gosford |
| 15:00 UTC+11 | Hutchinson 12' | | Rech 90'; Dodd 85' | Attendance: 5,467; Referee: (New Zealand) Peter O'Leary |

| 13 November 2005 | Sydney FC | 1–0 | Queensland Roar | Aussie Stadium, Sydney |
| 17:00 UTC+11 | Zdrillic 54' | | | Attendance: 13,030; Referee: Ben Williams |

==== Round 13 ====
| 18 November 2005 | Melbourne Victory | 0–2 | Central Coast Mariners | Olympic Park Stadium, Melbourne |
| 20:00 UTC+11 | | | Heffernan 75'; Hutchinson 38' | Attendance: 13,892; Referee: Ben Williams |

| 19 November 2005 | Sydney FC | 0–0 | Perth Glory | Aussie Stadium, Sydney |
| 19:00 UTC+11 | | | | Attendance: 16,242; Referee: Matthew Breeze |

| 20 November 2005 | Adelaide United | 1–0 | New Zealand Knights | Hindmarsh Stadium, Adelaide |
| 16:30 UTC+10.30 | Qu 38' | | | Attendance: 9,676; Referee: Angelo Nardi |

| 20 November 2005 | Queensland Roar | 0–1 | Newcastle Jets | Suncorp Stadium, Brisbane |
| 18:00 UTC+10 | | | Thompson 34' | Attendance: 13,004; Referee: Mark Shield |

==== Round 14 ====
| 25 November 2005 | Central Coast Mariners | 2–2 | Queensland Roar | Bluetongue Stadium, Gosford |
| 20:00 UTC+11 | Heffernan 89'; Osman 56' | | Brosque 7', 78' | Attendance: 5,194; Referee: Matthew Breeze |

| 25 November 2005 | Perth Glory | 0–1 | Newcastle Jets | Members Equity Stadium, Perth |
| 17:00 UTC+8 | | | Coveny 47' | Attendance: 7,921; Referee: Simon Przydacz |

| 26 November 2005 | New Zealand Knights | 2–3 | Melbourne Victory | North Harbour Stadium, Auckland |
| 20:00 UTC+13 | Devine 40' (pen.); Christie 30' | | Kitzbichler 43', 73'; Muscat 28' (pen.) | Attendance: 1,922; Referee: (New Zealand) Peter O'Leary |

| 27 November 2005 | Adelaide United | 3–2 | Sydney FC | Hindmarsh Stadium, Adelaide |
| 16:30 UTC+10.30 | Rech 4', 84'; Veart 14' | | Miura 33', 76' | Attendance: 14,068; Referee: Mark Shield |

==== Round 15 ====
| 1 December 2005 | Queensland Roar | 1–1 | New Zealand Knights | Suncorp Stadium, Brisbane |
| 19:00 UTC+10 | Brownlie 28' | | Yeo 44' | Attendance: 8,607; Referee: James Lewis |

| 2 December 2005 | Newcastle Jets | 1–2 | Adelaide United | EnergyAustralia Stadium, Newcastle |
| 20:00 UTC+11 | Johnson 59' | | Brain 79'; Veart 75' | Attendance: 10,132; Referee: Simon Przydacz |

| 3 December 2005 | Sydney FC | 2–1 | Melbourne Victory | Aussie Stadium, Sydney |
| 19:00 UTC+11 | Carney 81'; Corica 24' | | Allsopp 88' | Attendance: 17,272; Referee: Matthew Breeze |

| 4 December 2005 | Perth Glory | 2–2 | Central Coast Mariners | Members Equity Stadium, Perth |
| 16:00 UTC+8 | Ishida 65'; Ward 54' | | Petrie 12'; Hutchinson 8' | Attendance: 7,428; Referee: Mark Shield |

==== Round 16 ====
| 29 December 2005 | Melbourne Victory | 2–2 | Perth Glory | Olympic Park Stadium, Melbourne |
| 20:00 UTC+11 | Allsopp 45'; Thompson 23' | | Ward 67'; Mori 5' | Attendance: 14,754; Referee: (New Zealand) Peter O'Leary |

| 30 December 2005 | New Zealand Knights | 2–2 | Sydney FC | North Harbour Stadium, Auckland |
| 20:00 UTC+13 | Brockie 86'; Devine 3' | | Yorke 45' (pen.); Carney 6' | Attendance: 4,212; Referee: Peter Green |

| 31 December 2005 | Central Coast Mariners | 4–1 | Newcastle Jets | Bluetongue Stadium, Gosford |
| 18:00 UTC+11 | Hutchinson 71', 82'; Brown 30'; Gumprecht 3' | | Coveny 85' | Attendance: 11,612; Referee: Mark Shield |

| 1 January 2006 | Adelaide United | 4–2 | Queensland Roar | Hindmarsh Stadium, Adelaide |
| 18:30 UTC+10.30 | Rech 40', 63'; Qu 30'; Veart 29' | | Baird 83'; Brosque 11' | Attendance: 8,426; Referee: Matthew Breeze |

==== Round 17 ====
| 5 January 2006 | Adelaide United | 1–0 | Melbourne Victory | Hindmarsh Stadium, Adelaide |
| 19:30 UTC+10.30 | Dodd 14' | | | Attendance: 13,427; Referee: Mark Shield |

| 6 January 2006 | Sydney FC | 0–0 | Newcastle Jets | Aussie Stadium, Sydney |
| 20:00 UTC+11 | | | | Attendance: 15,211; Referee: Matthew Breeze |

| 7 January 2006 | Perth Glory | 0–2 | Queensland Roar | Members Equity Stadium, Perth |
| 19:00 UTC+8 | | | Baird 80'; Reinaldo 10' | Attendance: 11,087; Referee: Peter Green |

| 8 January 2006 | Central Coast Mariners | 1–0 | New Zealand Knights | Bluetongue Stadium, Gosford |
| 17:00 UTC+11 | Heffernan 90' | | | Attendance: 7,257; Referee: Strebre Delovski |

==== Round 18 ====
| 12 January 2006 | Perth Glory | 1–2 | Adelaide United | Members Equity Stadium, Perth |
| 19:00 UTC+8 | Ward 86' | | Aloisi 71'; Qu 3' | Attendance: 5,033; Referee: Matthew Breeze |

| 13 January 2006 | Newcastle Jets | 3–0 | New Zealand Knights | EnergyAustralia Stadium, Newcastle |
| 20:00 UTC+11 | Haliti 86', 90'; Milicic 19' | | | Attendance: 6,862; Referee: Perry Mur |

| 14 January 2006 | Sydney FC | 1–1 | Central Coast Mariners | Aussie Stadium, Sydney |
| 19:00 UTC+11 | Carney 61' | | Pondeljak 52' | Attendance: 15,977; Referee: Ben Williams |

| 15 January 2006 | Queensland Roar | 0–1 | Melbourne Victory | Suncorp Stadium, Brisbane |
| 18:00 UTC+10 | | | Thompson 56' | Attendance: 12,710; Referee: Mark Shield |

==== Round 19 ====
| 19 January 2006 | New Zealand Knights | 1–4 | Perth Glory | North Harbour Stadium, Auckland |
| 20:00 UTC+13 | Emblen 7' | | Harnwell 78'; Coyne 14'; Sekulovski 11', 42' | Attendance: 3,024; Referee: Neil Fox |

| 20 January 2006 | Adelaide United | 1–1 | Central Coast Mariners | Hindmarsh Stadium, Adelaide |
| 19:30 UTC+10.30 | Veart 50' (pen.) | | Kwasnik 54' | Attendance: 13,008; Referee: Mark Shield |

| 21 January 2006 | Queensland Roar | 2–1 | Sydney FC | Suncorp Stadium, Brisbane |
| 19:00 UTC+10 | Brosque 60', 70' | | Petrovski 85' | Attendance: 13,302; Referee: Simon Przydacz |

| 22 January 2006 | Newcastle Jets | 1–0 | Melbourne Victory | EnergyAustralia Stadium, Newcastle |
| 17:00 UTC+11 | Coveny 36' | | | Attendance: 9,073; Referee: Matthew Breeze |

==== Round 20 ====
| 26 January 2006 | Newcastle Jets | 0–5 | Queensland Roar | EnergyAustralia Stadium, Newcastle |
| 20:00 UTC+11 | | | Murdocca 90'; McKay 83'; Brosque 52'; Richter 44'; Reinaldo 10' | Attendance: 10,271; Referee: (New Zealand) Peter O'Leary |

| 27 January 2006 | Central Coast Mariners | 3–1 | Melbourne Victory | Bluetongue Stadium, Gosford |
| 20:00 UTC+11 | Heffernan 88'; Spencer 28', 62' | | Ferrante 13' | Attendance: 11,945; Referee: Simon Przydacz |

| 28 January 2006 | New Zealand Knights | 1–1 | Adelaide United | North Harbour Stadium, Auckland |
| 20:00 UTC+13 | Zhang 71' | | Brain 21' | Attendance: 3,079; Referee: Perry Mur |

| 29 January 2006 | Perth Glory | 1–2 | Sydney FC | Members Equity Stadium, Perth |
| 16:00 UTC+8 | Despotovski 53' | | Zadkovich 23'; Rudan 14' | Attendance: 12,796; Referee: Craig Zetter |

==== Round 21 ====
| 3 February 2006 | Sydney FC | 2–1 | Adelaide United | Aussie Stadium, Sydney |
| 20:00 UTC+11 | Ceccoli 71'; Yorke 48' (pen.) | | Qu 90' | Attendance: 25,557; Referee: Mark Shield |

| 4 February 2006 | Melbourne Victory | 2–1 | New Zealand Knights | Olympic Park Stadium, Melbourne |
| 18:00 UTC+11 | Muscat 21' (pen.); Byrnes 2' | | Brockie 90' | Attendance: 10,078; Referee: Angelo Nardi |

| 4 February 2006 | Queensland Roar | 2–2 | Central Coast Mariners | Suncorp Stadium, Brisbane |
| 19:00 UTC+10 | Baird 60'; Brosque 3' | | O'Sullivan 81'; Petrie 33' | Attendance: 13,641; Referee: Ben Williams |

| 5 February 2006 | Newcastle Jets | 1–3 | Perth Glory | EnergyAustralia Stadium, Newcastle |
| 17:00 UTC+11 | Coveny 34' | | Mori 71'; Picken 58' (o.g.); Ward 9' | Attendance: 9,232; Referee: Matthew Breeze |

== Finals series ==
After the home and away season, the finals series began, with the top four teams. The finals series used a modified Page playoff system, with the difference that each first-round game would be played over two legs. The winner of the finals series, Sydney FC was crowned as the A-League champion. Adelaide United, as the holder of the top position on the league ladder, were named the 2005–06 premiers.

Standard cup rules – such as the away goals rule (two-leg ties only), extra time and penalty shootouts were used to decide drawn games.

Semifinals
1 | Adelaide United | 2 | 1 | 3
2 | Sydney FC | 2 | 2 | 4
3 | Central Coast Mariners | 1 | 1 | 2
4 | Newcastle Jets | 0 | 1 | 1

Preliminary final
1 | Adelaide United | 0
3 | Central Coast Mariners | 1

Final
2 | Sydney FC | 1
3 | Central Coast Mariners | 0

=== Semi-finals ===
| 12 February 2006 | Adelaide United | 2–2 | Sydney FC | Hindmarsh Stadium, Adelaide |
| 17:00 UTC+10.30 | Rech 34'; Dodd 31' | | Petrovski 39'; Corica 9' | Attendance: 15,104; Referee: Matthew Breeze |

| 19 February 2006 | Sydney FC | 2–1 | Adelaide United | Aussie Stadium, Sydney |
| 17:00 UTC+11 | Rudan 76'; Petrovski 29' | | Qu 60' | Attendance: 30,377; Referee: Mark Shield |

Sydney FC won 4–3 on aggregate.

| 10 February 2006 | Newcastle Jets | 0–1 | Central Coast Mariners | EnergyAustralia Stadium, Newcastle |
| 20:00 UTC+11 | | | Osman 76' | Attendance: 10,236; Referee: Ben Williams |

| 17 February 2006 | Central Coast Mariners | 1–1 | Newcastle Jets | Bluetongue Stadium, Gosford |
| 20:00 UTC+11 | Heffernan 79' | | Thompson 28' | Attendance: 17,429; Referee: Simon Przydacz |

Central Coast Mariners won 2–1 on aggregate.

=== Preliminary final ===
| 26 February 2006 | Adelaide United | 0–1 | Central Coast Mariners | Hindmarsh Stadium, Adelaide |
| 17:00 UTC+10.30 | | | Pondeljak 7' | Attendance: 11,405; Referee: Matthew Breeze |

=== Grand Final ===
| 5 March 2006 | Sydney FC | 1–0 | Central Coast Mariners | Aussie Stadium, Sydney |
| 17:00 UTC+11 | Corica 62' | | | Attendance: 41,689; Referee: Mark Shield |

== Statistics ==
=== Attendance ===
| Team | Hosted | Average | High | Low | Total |
|---|---|---|---|---|---|
| Sydney FC | 11 | 16,669 | 25,557 | 9,132 | 183,355 |
| Queensland Roar | 11 | 14,785 | 23,142 | 8,607 | 162,636 |
| Melbourne Victory | 10 | 14,158 | 18,026 | 10,078 | 141,578 |
| Adelaide United | 10 | 10,947 | 14,068 | 7,013 | 109,473 |
| Perth Glory | 11 | 9,734 | 13,157 | 5,033 | 107,075 |
| Newcastle Jets | 11 | 8,912 | 13,000 | 5,868 | 98,027 |
| Central Coast Mariners | 10 | 7,899 | 17,429 | 5,194 | 78,989 |
| New Zealand Knights | 10 | 3,909 | 9,900 | 1,922 | 39,086 |
| League total | 84 | 10,955 | 25,557 | 1,922 | 920,219 |

==== Highest attendance ====
- 41,689: Sydney FC vs Central Coast Mariners, 5 March 2006 (grand final)
- 30,377: Sydney FC vs Adelaide United, 19 February 2006 (Semi-final Leg2)
- 25,557: Sydney FC vs Adelaide United, 3 February 2006 (Round 21)
- 25,208: Sydney FC vs Melbourne Victory, 28 August 2005 (Round 1)
- 23,142: Queensland Roar vs Sydney FC, 23 September 2005 (Round 5)
- 20,725: Queensland Roar vs New Zealand Knights, 28 August 2005 (Round 1)
- 18,276: Sydney FC vs Adelaide United, 9 October 2005 (Round 7)
- 18,206: Melbourne Victory vs Sydney FC, 16 October 2005 (Round 8)
- 17,960: Melbourne Victory vs Perth Glory, 4 September 2005 (Round 2)

=== Leading goalscorers ===
| Total | Player | | Team | Goals per Round | | | | | | | | | | | | | | | | | | | | |
| Total | Player | | Team | 1 | 2 | 3 | 4 | 5 | 6 | 7 | 8 | 9 | 10 | 11 | 12 | 13 | 14 | 15 | 16 | 17 | 18 | 19 | 20 | 21 |
|---|---|---|---|---|---|---|---|---|---|---|---|---|---|---|---|---|---|---|---|---|---|---|---|---|
| 8 | (Australia) | Alex Brosque | Brisbane Roar | 1 | | | | | | | | | | | | | 2 | | 1 | | | 2 | 1 | 1 |
| 8 | (Australia) | Bobby Despotovski | Perth Glory | | 1 | 2 | | | 1 | 1 | | | | 1 | 1 | | | | | | | | 1 | |
| 8 | (Australia) | Archie Thompson | Melbourne Victory | 1 | | | | 1 | 1 | | 2 | 1 | | | | | | | 1 | | 1 | | | |
| 8 | (Scotland) | Stewart Petrie | Central Coast Mariners | | 1 | | 1 | | | | 2 | | 2 | | | | | 1 | | | | | | 1 |
| 7 | (Australia) | Carl Veart | Adelaide United | 1 | | | | | | | | | 1 | 1 | | | 1 | 1 | 1 | | | 1 | | |
| 7 | (Australia) | Dean Heffernan | Central Coast Mariners | | | | | | 1 | | 1 | | 1 | | | 1 | 1 | | | 1 | | | 1 | |
| 7 | (Trinidad and Tobago) | Dwight Yorke | Sydney FC | 1 | | 1 | 1 | | 1 | | | | | 1 | | | | | 1 | | | | | 1 |
| 7 | (Australia) | Ante Milicic | Newcastle Jets | | 1 | 1 | | | | | | | 1 | 3 | | | | | | | 1 | | | |
| 7 | (Australia) | Sasho Petrovski | Sydney FC | | | | | | 1 | 1 | | 1 | | 3 | | | | | | | | 1 | | |
| 7 | (Australia) | Damian Mori | Perth Glory | | | | | | | 2 | | | | 3 | | | | | 1 | | | | | 1 |

=== Disciplinary records ===
| Player | Team | Yellow | 2YC | Red |
|---|---|---|---|---|
| Terry McFlynn | Sydney FC | 7 | 0 | 0 |
| Matt McKay | Queensland Roar | 3 | 1 | 1 |
| Kevin Muscat | Melbourne Victory | 4 | 1 | 0 |
| Ross Aloisi | Adelaide United | 6 | 0 | 0 |
| Remo Buess | Queensland Roar | 6 | 0 | 0 |

=== Biggest victories ===
| | Score | | Date | Round |
|---|---|---|---|---|
| Melbourne Victory | 5–0 | Sydney FC | 16 Oct 2005 | 8 |
| Queensland Roar | 5–0 | Newcastle Jets | 26 Jan 2006 | 20 |
| Perth Glory | 5–1 | Newcastle Jets | 8 Oct 2005 | 7 |
| Sydney FC | 5–1 | Central Coast Mariners | 5 Nov 2005 | 11 |
| Newcastle Jets | 4–0 | New Zealand Knights | 18 Sep 2005 | 4 |
| Central Coast Mariners | 4–0 | Perth Glory | 8 Oct 2005 | 8 |

=== Highest aggregate scores ===
| | Score | | Date | Round |
|---|---|---|---|---|
| Perth Glory | 5–1 | Newcastle Jets | 8 Oct 2005 | 7 |
| Sydney FC | 5–1 | Central Coast Mariners | 5 Nov 2005 | 11 |
| Newcastle Jets | 4–2 | Adelaide United | 14 Oct 2005 | 8 |
| Newcastle Jets | 4–2 | New Zealand Knights | 4 Nov 2005 | 11 |
| Perth Glory | 4–2 | Adelaide United | 6 Nov 2005 | 11 |
| Adelaide United | 4–2 | Queensland Roar | 1 Jan 2006 | 16 |

=== Other honours ===
- First goal – Carl Veart (Adelaide United vs Newcastle Jets, Round 1)
- First hat trick – Ante Milicic (Newcastle Jets vs New Zealand Knights, Round 11)
- First red card – Richie Alagich (Adelaide United vs Melbourne Victory, Round 3)

== Awards ==
| Award | Recipient |
|---|---|
| Johnny Warren Medal (Player's Player of the Year) | Bobby Despotovski (Perth Glory) |
| Golden Boot Award (Top Goalscorer) | Alex Brosque (Brisbane Roar); Bobby Despotovski (Perth Glory); Archie Thompson (Melbourne Victory); Stewart Petrie (Central Coast Mariners) |
| Rising Star Award (U-20 Player of the Year) | Nick Ward (Perth Glory) |
| Coach of the Year | Lawrie McKinna (Central Coast Mariners) |
| Referee of the Year | Mark Shield |
| Joe Marston Medal (Best player in grand final) | Dwight Yorke (Sydney FC) |

== AFC Champions League ==
Although Australia became a member of the Asian Football Confederation in 2006, Australian teams were not invited to participate in the 2006 AFC Champions League competition.

The AFC later determined that qualification for the 2007 AFC Champions League would be based on the 2005–06 A-League competition, despite that ACL matches will commence after the completion of the 2006–07 A-League season. Adelaide as Premiers and Sydney as Champions were the representatives.

== See also ==
- 2005–06 Adelaide United FC season
- 2005–06 Central Coast Mariners FC season
- 2005–06 Melbourne Victory FC season
- 2005–06 Newcastle Jets FC season
- 2005–06 New Zealand Knights FC season
- 2005–06 Perth Glory FC season
- 2005–06 Queensland Roar FC season
- 2005–06 Sydney FC season
