= 1997–98 Newcastle Breakers FC season =

Newcastle Breakers
1997–98 season
- Manager: John Kosmina
- Stadium: Topper Stadium
- National Soccer League: 13th
- Top goalscorer: Clayton Zane (8)
- Highest home attendance: 5,095 vs. South Melbourne (17 October 1997); National Soccer League
- Lowest home attendance: 2,119 vs. Sydney United (27 February 1998); National Soccer League
- Average home league attendance: 3,242
- Biggest win: 4–2 vs. Adelaide Sharks (3 October 1997); National Soccer League; 3–1 vs. Sydney United (27 February 1998); National Soccer League
- Biggest defeat: 0–4 vs. Adelaide City (7 January 1998); National Soccer League; 1–5 vs. Gippsland Falcons (16 January 1998); National Soccer League

The 1997–98 season was the sixth season in the history of Newcastle Breakers. It was also the sixth season in the National Soccer League.

== Players ==
Note: Flags indicate national team as defined under FIFA eligibility rules; some limited exceptions apply. Players may hold more than one non-FIFA nationality.

No.	Pos.	Nation	Player
1	GK	AUS	Liam Baker
2	MF	AUS	Glenn Sprod
3	DF	AUS	Matthew Austin
4	DF	AUS	Shane Pryce (Captain)
5	DF	AUS	Todd McManus
6	MF	NZL	Robert Ironside
7	MF	AUS	Peter Ritchie
8	MF	AUS	Mark Wilson
9	FW	AUS	Clayton Zane
10	FW	AUS	Reece Tollenaere
11	MF	AUS	Troy Halpin
12	DF	AUS	Doug West

No.	Pos.	Nation	Player
13	MF	AUS	David Hodgson
14	FW	AUS	Liam McGuire
15	MF	AUS	Michael Williams
16	DF	ENG	Shaun Edwards
17	MF	AUS	Matthew Lowe
18	MF	AUS	Ben Lane
20	GK	AUS	Brad Swancott
—	FW	AUS	Jason Bennett
—	DF	AUS	Eddy Bosnar
—	MF	ARG	Leo Langone
—	MF	MAR	Fouad Umlil

== Competitions ==
=== Overview ===
Competition	First match	Last match	Starting round	Final position	Record							
Competition	First match	Last match	Starting round	Final position	Pld	W	D	L	GF	GA	GD	Win %
National Soccer League	3 October 1997	12 April 1998	Matchday 1	13th	26	4	9	13	30	50	−20	15.38
Total					26	4	9	13	30	50	−20	15.38

Last updated: complete
Source: Competitions

=== National Soccer League ===
==== League table ====
Pos	Team	Pld	W	D	L	GF	GA	GD	Pts	Qualification
1	South Melbourne (C)	26	13	9	4	56	41	+15	48	Qualification for the Finals series
2	Carlton	26	12	9	5	44	24	+20	45	Qualification for the Finals series
3	Adelaide City	26	13	4	9	45	30	+15	43	Qualification for the Finals series
4	Sydney United	26	11	10	5	37	26	+11	43	Qualification for the Finals series
5	Marconi Fairfield	26	12	7	7	33	25	+8	43	Qualification for the Finals series
6	Wollongong Wolves	26	13	3	10	51	33	+18	42	Qualification for the Finals series
7	Melbourne Knights	26	11	6	9	37	35	+2	39	
8	Perth Glory	26	10	6	10	35	40	−5	36	
9	UTS Olympic	26	10	5	11	37	43	−6	35	
10	West Adelaide	26	10	4	12	32	38	−6	34	
11	Gippsland Falcons	26	8	7	11	28	36	−8	31	
12	Brisbane Strikers	26	6	5	15	23	40	−17	23	
13	Newcastle Breakers	26	4	9	13	30	50	−20	21	
14	Canberra Cosmos	26	3	8	15	29	56	−27	17	

Source: rsssf.com
Rules for classification: 1) points; 2) goal difference; 3) number of goals scored.
(C) Champions

==== Results summary ====
Overall								Home						Away					
Pld	W	D	L	GF	GA	GD	Pts	W	D	L	GF	GA	GD	W	D	L	GF	GA	GD
26	4	9	13	30	50	−20	21	3	4	6	16	21	−5	1	5	7	14	29	−15

Source: worldfootball.net

==== Results by round ====
Round	1	2	3	4	5	6	7	8	9	10	11	12	13	14	15	16	17	18	19	20	21	22	23	24	25	26
Ground	H	A	H	A	H	A	H	A	H	A	A	H	A	H	A	H	A	H	A	H	A	H	A	H	H	A
Result	W	D	L	D	L	L	D	L	L	L	D	L	L	D	L	L	L	L	W	W	D	D	L	D	W	D
Position	2	3	7	9	9	11	11	12	13	13	13	14	14	14	14	14	14	14	14	14	13	13	14	13	13	13

Source: worldfootball.net
A = Away; H = Home; W = Win; D = Draw; L = Loss

==== Matches ====
3 October 1997 1	Newcastle Breakers	4–2	Adelaide Sharks	Newcastle
	Zane 9', 11', 25' (pen.); Bennett 79'	Report	Cardozo 44' (pen.); Castro 85'	Stadium: Topper Stadium; Attendance: 5,022; Referee: Mark Shield

12 October 1997 2	Gippsland Falcons	1–1	Newcastle Breakers	Morwell
	Osman 88'	Report	Zane 82'	Stadium: Falcons Park; Attendance: 3,571; Referee: J. Blaney

17 October 1997 3	Newcastle Breakers	0–2	South Melbourne	Newcastle
		Report	Trimboli 66'; Panopoulos 79' (pen.)	Stadium: Topper Stadium; Attendance: 5,095; Referee: Matthew Breeze

26 October 1997 4	Wollongong City	1–1	Newcastle Breakers	Wollongong
	Chipperfield 20'	Report	McManus 70'	Stadium: WIN Stadium; Attendance: 4,116; Referee: Simon Micallef

31 October 1997 5	Newcastle Breakers	2–3	Perth Glory	Newcastle
	Pryce 19' (pen.); Lane 87'	Report	Despotovski 12'; Strudwick 50'; Miller 64'	Stadium: Topper Stadium; Attendance: 4,183; Referee: G. Leverton

7 November 1997 6	Sydney United	2–0	Newcastle Breakers	Sydney
	Bilokapic 20' (pen.); Bosevski 25'	Report		Stadium: Parramatta Stadium; Attendance: 3,656; Referee: D. Dwight

14 November 1997 7	Newcastle Breakers	0–0	Carlton	Newcastle
		Report		Stadium: Topper Stadium; Attendance: 3,284; Referee: Con Diomis

28 November 1997 9	Newcastle Breakers	1–2	Brisbane Strikers	Newcastle
	Zane 90'	Report	Brown 28'; Farina 57'	Stadium: Topper Stadium; Attendance: 2,282; Referee: G. Leverton

5 December 1997 10	Melbourne Knights	4–1	Newcastle Breakers	Melbourne
	Pondeljak 1', 23'; Kelic 40'; Banini 76'	Report		Stadium: Knights Stadium; Attendance: 3,140; Referee: Eugene Brazzale

13 December 1997 11	Canberra Cosmos	1–1	Newcastle Breakers	Queanbeyan
	Moric 44'	Report	McGuire 87'	Stadium: Seiffert Oval; Attendance: 1,576; Referee: J. Blaney

19 December 1997 12	Newcastle Breakers	2–3	UTS Olympic	Newcastle
	Ritchie 18'; Wilson 65'	Report	Petratos 20'; Tsekenis 67'; Tome 80' (pen.)	Stadium: Topper Stadium; Attendance: 2,237; Referee: B. McKay

27 December 1997 13	Marconi Fairfield	2–1	Newcastle Breakers	Sydney
	Awaritefe 15'; Maloney 47'	Report	Zane 44'	Stadium: Marconi Stadium; Attendance: 3,286; Referee: Con Diomis

2 January 1998 14	Newcastle Breakers	0–0	Marconi Fairfield	Newcastle
		Report		Stadium: Topper Stadium; Attendance: 3,892; Referee: G. Leverton

7 January 1998 8	Adelaide City	4–0	Newcastle Breakers	Adelaide
	Mori 28', 73', 84'; Brooks 37'	Report		Stadium: Hindmarsh Stadium; Attendance: 3,497; Referee: Gerry Connolly

11 January 1998 15	Adelaide Sharks	3–1	Newcastle Breakers	Adelaide
	Cardozo 61', 90+'; Artone 90+'	Report	Lowe 47'	Stadium: Hindmarsh Stadium; Attendance: 2,410; Referee: W. Dade

16 January 1998 16	Newcastle Breakers	1–5	Gippsland Falcons	Newcastle
	Pryce 68' (pen.)	Report	Foy 4'; Tricarico 39', 62'; Tsaltas 65'; MacNicol 82'	Stadium: Topper Stadium; Attendance: 2,888; Referee: B. Panella

25 January 1998 17	South Melbourne	2–1	Newcastle Breakers	Melbourne
	Curcija 70'; Trimboli 90'	Report	Zane 85'	Stadium: Bob Jane Stadium; Attendance: 3,887; Referee: D. Dwight

30 January 1998 18	Newcastle Breakers	1–2	Wollongong City	Newcastle
	Ironside 35'	Report	Perinich 12'; Surjan 20'	Stadium: Topper Stadium; Attendance: 2,389; Referee: B. McKay

22 February 1998 19	Perth Glory	3–4	Newcastle Breakers	Perth
	Kalogeracos 3'; S. Halpin 60', 75'	Report	Tollenaere 6', 14', 86'; Pryce 24' (pen.)	Stadium: Perth Oval; Attendance: 13,228; Referee: Gerry Connolly

27 February 1998 20	Newcastle Breakers	3–1	Sydney United	Newcastle
	Ironside 46'; Zane 48'; Bennett 85'	Report	Phillips 24'	Stadium: Topper Stadium; Attendance: 2,119; Referee: G. Leverton

7 March 1998 21	Brisbane Strikers	1–1	Newcastle Breakers	Brisbane
	Harper 65'	Report	Tollenaere 82'	Stadium: Suncorp Stadium; Attendance: 3,129; Referee: Con Diomis

13 March 1998 22	Newcastle Breakers	0–0	Adelaide City	Newcastle
		Report		Stadium: Topper Stadium; Attendance: 2,837; Referee: Matthew Breeze

23 March 1998 23	Carlton	3–0	Newcastle Breakers	Melbourne
	Vlahos 55', 85' (pen.); Josefovski 90'	Report		Stadium: Olympic Park; Attendance: 1,548; Referee: J. Blaney

27 March 1998 24	Newcastle Breakers	0–0	Melbourne Knights	Newcastle
		Report		Stadium: Topper Stadium; Attendance: 2,583; Referee: Eugene Brazzale

3 April 1998 25	Newcastle Breakers	2–1	Canberra Cosmos	Newcastle
	Pryce 12' (pen.); Bosnar 54'	Report	Buljan 59'	Stadium: Topper Stadium; Attendance: 3,344; Referee: Con Diomis

12 April 1998 26	UTS Olympic	2–2	Newcastle Breakers	Sydney
	Tome 51', 83'	Report	Tollenaere 12'; Langone 60'	Stadium: Belmore Sports Ground; Attendance: 2,032; Referee: Matthew Breeze

== Statistics ==
=== Appearances and goals ===
Players with no appearances not included in the list.

No.	Pos.	Nat.	Name	National Soccer League		Total	
No.	Pos.	Nat.	Name	Apps	Goals	Apps	Goals
1	GK	(Australia)	Liam Baker	9	0	9	0
2	MF	(Australia)	Glenn Sprod	20(4)	0	24	0
3	DF	(Australia)	Matthew Austin	17(2)	0	19	0
4	DF	(Australia)	Shane Pryce	25	5	25	5
5	DF	(Australia)	Todd McManus	26	1	26	1
6	MF	(New Zealand)	Robert Ironside	22	2	22	2
7	MF	(Australia)	Peter Ritchie	21(1)	1	22	1
8	MF	(Australia)	Mark Wilson	11(10)	1	21	1
9	FW	(Australia)	Clayton Zane	22	8	22	8
10	FW	(Australia)	Reece Tollenaere	10	5	10	5
11	MF	(Australia)	Troy Halpin	10(1)	0	11	0
12	DF	(Australia)	Doug West	9(7)	0	16	0
14	FW	(Australia)	Liam McGuire	5(5)	1	10	1
15	MF	(Australia)	Michael Williams	1(2)	0	3	0
16	DF	(England)	Shaun Edwards	8(2)	0	10	0
17	MF	(Australia)	Matthew Lowe	15(5)	1	20	1
18	MF	(Australia)	Ben Lane	4(8)	1	12	1
20	GK	(Australia)	Brad Swancott	17	0	17	0
—	FW	(Australia)	Jason Bennett	18(3)	2	21	2
—	DF	(Australia)	Eddy Bosnar	6	1	6	1
—	MF	(Argentina)	Leo Langone	8	1	8	1
—	MF	(Morocco)	Fouad Umlil	2(1)	0	3	0

=== Clean sheets ===
Rank	No.	Pos	Nat	Name	National Soccer League	Total
1	20	GK	(Australia)	Brad Swancott	3	3
1	1	GK	(Australia)	Liam Baker	1	1
Total					4	4
