= Brisbane Roar FC league record by opponent =

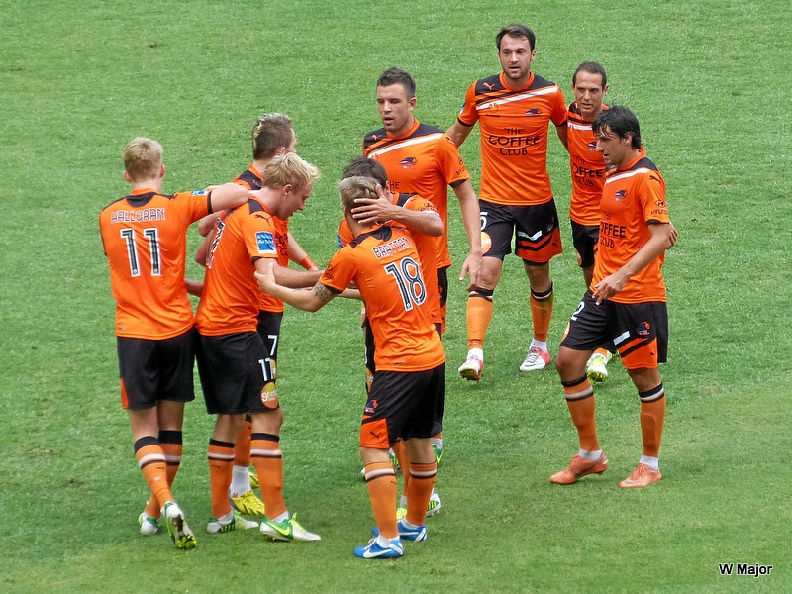
Brisbane Roar players celebrating a goal scored.

Brisbane Roar Football Club is an Australian professional association football club based in Brisbane, Queensland. The club was formed in 1957 as Hollandia-Inala before breaking off from Queensland Lions in 2005. They became the first Queensland member admitted into the A-League Men in 2005.

Brisbane Roar's first team have competed in the A-League. Their record in the A-League is listed below. Brisbane Roar's first A-League match was against New Zealand Knights, and they met their 37th and most recent different league opponent, Macarthur FC, for the first time in the 2020–21 A-League season. The team that Brisbane Roar have played most in league competition is Central Coast Mariners, who they first met in the 2005–06 A-League season. The 25 defeats against Adelaide United is more than they have lost against any other club. Sydney FC have drawn 17 league encounters with Brisbane Roar, more than any other club. Brisbane Roar have recorded more league victories against Central Coast Mariners than against any other club, having beaten them 32 times out of 56 attempts.

== Key ==
- The table includes results of matches played by Brisbane Roar (including under the former names of Brisbane Lions and Queensland Roar) in the National Soccer League and A-League Men.
- The name used for each opponent is the name they had when Brisbane Roar most recently played a league match against them. Results against each opponent include results against that club under any former name. For example, results against Melbourne City include matches played against Melbourne Heart (2010–2014).
- The columns headed "First" and "Last" contain the first and most recent seasons in which Brisbane Roar played league matches against each opponent.
- P = matches played; W = matches won; D = matches drawn; L = matches lost; Win% = percentage of total matches won
- † Clubs with this background and symbol in the "Opponent" column are Brisbane Roar's divisional rivals in the current season.
- ‡ Clubs with this background and symbol in the "Opponent" column are defunct.

== All-time league record ==
Statistics correct as of matches played on 21 January 2023.

Brisbane Roar FC league record by opponent
Club	P	W	D	L	P	W	D	L	P	W	D	L	Win%	First	Last	Notes
Club	Home				Away				Total				Win%	First	Last	Notes
Adelaide United †	27	8	7	12	27	11	4	12	55	19	11	25	34.55	2005–06	2022–23	
Central Coast Mariners †	29	14	9	6	27	18	6	3	56	32	15	9	57.14	2005–06	2021–22	
Gold Coast United	4	2	1	1	5	1	1	3	9	3	2	4	33.33	2009–10	2011–12	
Macarthur FC †	3	1	1	1	2	1	0	1	5	2	1	2	40.00	2020–21	2022–23	
Melbourne City †	21	11	4	6	17	1	3	13	38	12	7	19	31.58	2010–11	2022–23	
Melbourne Victory †	27	11	5	11	26	7	7	12	54	19	12	23	35.19	2005–06	2022–23	
New Zealand Knights ‡	3	2	1	0	3	1	0	2	6	3	1	2	50.00	2005–06	2006–07	
Newcastle Jets †	23	6	4	13	28	13	8	7	51	19	12	20	37.25	2005–06	2022–23	
North Queensland Fury	2	1	1	0	4	2	2	0	6	3	3	0	50.00	2009–10	2010–11	
Perth Glory †	24	15	5	4	27	10	6	11	51	25	11	15	49.02	2005–06	2022–23	
Sydney FC †	26	14	6	6	26	5	10	11	53	19	17	17	35.85	2005–06	2022–23	
Wellington Phoenix †	24	15	5	4	20	6	7	7	45	21	13	11	46.67	2007–08	2022–23	
Western Sydney Wanderers †	17	7	5	5	18	5	7	6	35	12	12	11	34.29	2012–13	2022–23	
Western United †	3	1	0	2	4	1	1	2	8	2	1	5	25.00	2019–20	2022–23	
