= Sydney FC league record by opponent =

Sydney Football Club is an Australian professional association football club based in Moore Park, Sydney. The club was formed in 2004. They became the first Sydney member admitted into the A-League in 2005.

Sydney FC's first team have competed in the A-League Men Their record against each club in the A-League is listed below. Sydney FC's first A-League match was against Melbourne Victory, and they met their 14th and most recent different league opponent, Macarthur FC, for the first in the 2020–21 A-League season. The team that Sydney FC have played most in league competition is Melbourne Victory, who they first met in the 2005–06 A-League season. The 19 defeats against Adelaide United is more than they have lost against any other club. Melbourne Victory have drawn 20 league encounters with Sydney FC, more than any other club. Sydney FC have recorded more league victories against Newcastle Jets than against any other club, having beaten them both 30 times out of 52 attempts.

== Key ==
- The table includes results of matches played by Sydney FC in the A-League Men regular season and Finals series.
- The name used for each opponent is the name they had when Sydney FC most recently played a league match against them. Results against each opponent include results against that club under any former name. For example, results against Brisbane Roar include matches played against Queensland Roar (2005–2009).
- The columns headed "First" and "Last" contain the first and most recent seasons in which Sydney FC played league matches against each opponent.
- P = matches played; W = matches won; D = matches drawn; L = matches lost; Win% = percentage of total matches won
- † Clubs with this background and symbol in the "Opponent" column are Sydney FC's divisional rivals in the current season.
- ‡ Clubs with this background and symbol in the "Opponent" column are defunct.

== All-time league record ==
Statistics correct as of matches played on 14 January 2023.

Sydney FC league record by opponent
Club	P	W	D	L	P	W	D	L	P	W	D	L	Win%	First	Last	Notes
Club	Home				Away				Total				Win%	First	Last	Notes
Adelaide United †	29	15	5	9	25	9	6	10	55	24	12	19	43.64	2005–06	2022–23	
Brisbane Roar †	26	11	10	5	26	6	6	14	53	17	17	19	32.08	2005–06	2022–23	(Note: Record against Queensland Roar included.)
Central Coast Mariners †	26	15	5	6	25	10	6	9	51	25	11	15	49.02	2005–06	2022–23	
Gold Coast United	5	3	1	1	4	0	1	3	9	3	2	4	33.33	2009–10	2011–12	
Macarthur FC †	4	0	1	3	3	3	0	0	7	3	1	3	42.86	2020–21	2022–23	
Melbourne City †	17	7	5	5	17	6	5	6	36	14	10	12	38.89	2005–06	2022–23	(Note: Record against Melbourne Heart included.)
Melbourne Victory †	30	12	10	8	29	9	10	10	59	21	20	18	35.59	2005–06	2022–23	
New Zealand Knights ‡	3	2	0	1	3	2	1	0	6	4	1	1	66.67	2005–06	2006–07	
Newcastle Jets †	25	16	6	3	26	14	6	6	52	30	12	10	57.69	2005–06	2022–23	
North Queensland Fury †	3	1	1	1	3	1	0	2	6	2	1	3	33.33	2009–10	2010–11	
Perth Glory †	24	15	4	5	27	13	9	5	52	29	13	10	55.77	2005–06	2022–23	
Wellington Phoenix †	23	15	1	7	22	10	5	7	46	26	6	14	56.52	2005–06	2022–23	
Western Sydney Wanderers †	15	7	4	4	16	6	5	5	31	13	9	9	41.94	2012–13	2022–23	
Western United †	3	2	1	0	4	3	0	1	8	5	1	2	62.50	2019–20	2022–23	
