= Royce Brownlie =

Australian footballer (born 1980)

Personal information
- Full name: Royce Brownlie
- Date of birth: 28 January 1980 (age 46)
- Place of birth: Coffs Harbour, Australia
- Height: 1.84 m (6 ft 1/2 in)
- Position: Striker

Team information
- Current team: Albany Creek Excelsior

Youth career
- 1996–1998: QAS

Senior career*
Years	Team	Apps	(Gls)
1997–1999	Brisbane Strikers	5	(0)
2000	Brisbane Lions	11	(12)
2000–2002	Marconi Stallions	39	(17)
2002–2003	Parramatta Power	16	(1)
2003–2004	Brisbane Strikers	21	(3)
2005–2006	Queensland Roar	10	(2)
2006–2007	Swindon Town	15	(2)
2007	→ Chester City (loan)	4	(0)
2007–2008	Wellington Phoenix	8	(0)
2008–2010	Peninsula Power		
2011–2012	North Star FC		
2013–2016	Moreton Bay United	84	(72)
2017	Albany Creek Excelsior	20	(8)
2018–2019	Logan Lightning	39	(17)
- * Club domestic league appearances and goals as of 19 January 2020

Royce Brownlie (born 28 January 1980) is an Australian footballer who plays as a striker for NPL Queensland club Moreton Bay United

== Club career ==
Royce Brownlie was born in Coffs Harbour, New South Wales and began his football career at the Queensland Academy of Sport, representing them in the National Youth League in the 1996–97 and 1997–98 seasons. Brownlie scored a hat-trick in QAS's 4–1 win over UTS Olympic in round seven of 1996–97, and several goals in the following season to earn his call-up to the Brisbane Strikers senior team for the end of the 1997–98 National Soccer League season. Brownlie made five appearances for the Strikers in 1997–98, but none the following season, and so moved to the Brisbane Premier League to play for the Brisbane Lions. The 2000 BPL season was a large success for Brownlie, as he scored 12 goals in just 11 appearances for the Lions, as well as making his representative debut and scoring a goal for Queensland against his home state in September.

Brownlie then signed with Marconi Stallions for 2000–01, scoring six goals in 24 appearances in his first season with the Sydney club. He made his true breakthrough the following season though, breaking an NSL scoring record by scoring 8 goals in a series of four matches, and ending the 2001–02 season with 11 goals from his 15 appearances. His success earned him an invitation to trial with English club Sheffield Wednesday, and whilst on the verge of a contract offer, he broke his cheekbone and missed the opportunity. Upon recovery, Brownlie remained in England to trial with Brentford, Portsmouth, Oldham Athletic and Swindon Town throughout August 2002, and despite scoring a goal for Swindon in a friendly against Spanish side Sporting de Gijón after just 86 seconds, he returned to Australia without a contract.

After training with Perth Glory in the lead-up to the 2002–03 season, Brownlie eventually signed for Parramatta Power when contract negotiations with Perth Glory broke down. Despite Parramatta finishing third, Brownlie had a disappointing season personally. He was in the starting line-up just four times, and scored once – in Parramatta's 2–0 win over his old club Brisbane in round 8. This prompted Brownlie to return to the Strikers for the 2003–04 season, but he was hampered by injuries which forced him to undergo surgery on his knee, and he scored just three times in 21 appearances. From 2006 to 2008 Royce continued to play professionally in England and then New Zealand. From 2008 Royce has played mainly in player/coach roles for clubs in the Brisbane area in the National Premier Leagues Queensland and the Brisbane Premier League.

=== A-League ===
In February 2005, Brownlie was announced as one of the first eleven signings at new club Queensland Roar. He began playing for them in the annual Silver Boot competition, scoring a hat-trick against Pine Rivers in an early 7–1 victory, and the equaliser in the final against Rochedale Rovers. Brownlie's scoring form continued in the North Queensland Challenge Cup, scoring in Queensland's 2–1 win over the Central Coast Mariners in Townsville. Despite suffering a rib injury in a 5–0 Pre-season Cup win over New Zealand Knights, Brownlie recovered in time for Queensland's 2005–06 A-League season opener. Dropped in favour of Reece Tollenaere, Brownlie missed the following two rounds, and after earning a call-up into the starting line-up against Sydney FC, was struck by three onsets of a virus within a month, which also affected other members of the Queensland squad. Brownlie returned to the first team in round 8, and scored against Adelaide United the following week, but was hit by virus again and forced out of the squad. Following a further short absence, a suspension to fellow striker Michael Baird saw Brownlie return to the team against New Zealand, and he picked up his second league goal of the season.

The introduction of Brazilian striker Reinaldo to the Roar in early 2006, however, again forced Brownlie out of the squad and he played just twice more before the end of the season. Citing his proneness to injury and illness, Queensland declined to offer a contract extension, but gave him the opportunity to prove himself during their Tongyeong Cup campaign in South Korea. Still with no offer forthcoming and permission to negotiate with other clubs, Brownlie headed to England again in July 2006.

=== England ===
Four years after his first attempt, Brownlie trialled with Swindon Town again, and this time scored five goals in his first two trial matches for the Robins. On 27 July 2006 he signed for Swindon Town for their 2006–07 season in the English League Two. He scored his first league goal for the club on his debut, with a last-minute blistering strike against Barnet, shortly after an equaliser by Ricky Shakes, to seal a 2–1 victory. Brownlie earned a red card in Swindon Town's League Cup match against Brentford, and since his mandatory one-match suspension, has been deployed as a wide right midfielder by Paul Sturrock. Brownlie was released by Swindon Town on 9 May 2007 after an unsuccessful loan period at Chester City.

=== New Zealand ===
On 19 May 2007, Brownlie signed for A-League club Wellington Phoenix on a two-year contract but left the club on 4 March 2008 after struggling to gain a spot in the first team and will return to Brisbane to pursue a career in the construction industry.

=== Australia ===
Brownlie signed with Peninsula Power in the Brisbane Premier League alongside his brother Paul. He was also an assistant coach with the Power and netted 8 goals in 12 games in 2009 season. Brownlie joined North Star FC as player/coach and won the 2011 Brisbane Premier League Division 1 grand final and promotion to the Brisbane Premier League. In 2013, he became a foundation player and later player/coach with FFA National Premier Leagues Queensland club Moreton Bay United winning the 2015 NPLQ premiership/championship double. When he stepped down at the end of the 2016 season he was the most lethal striker in the short history of the NPLQ with 72 goals in four seasons. He plans to continue playing for Moreton Bay United feeder club Albany Creek Excelsior (ACE) in the Brisbane Premier League in 2017.
