= Seo Hyuk-su =

Korean-Australian former footballer (born 1973)

Seo Hyuk-Su
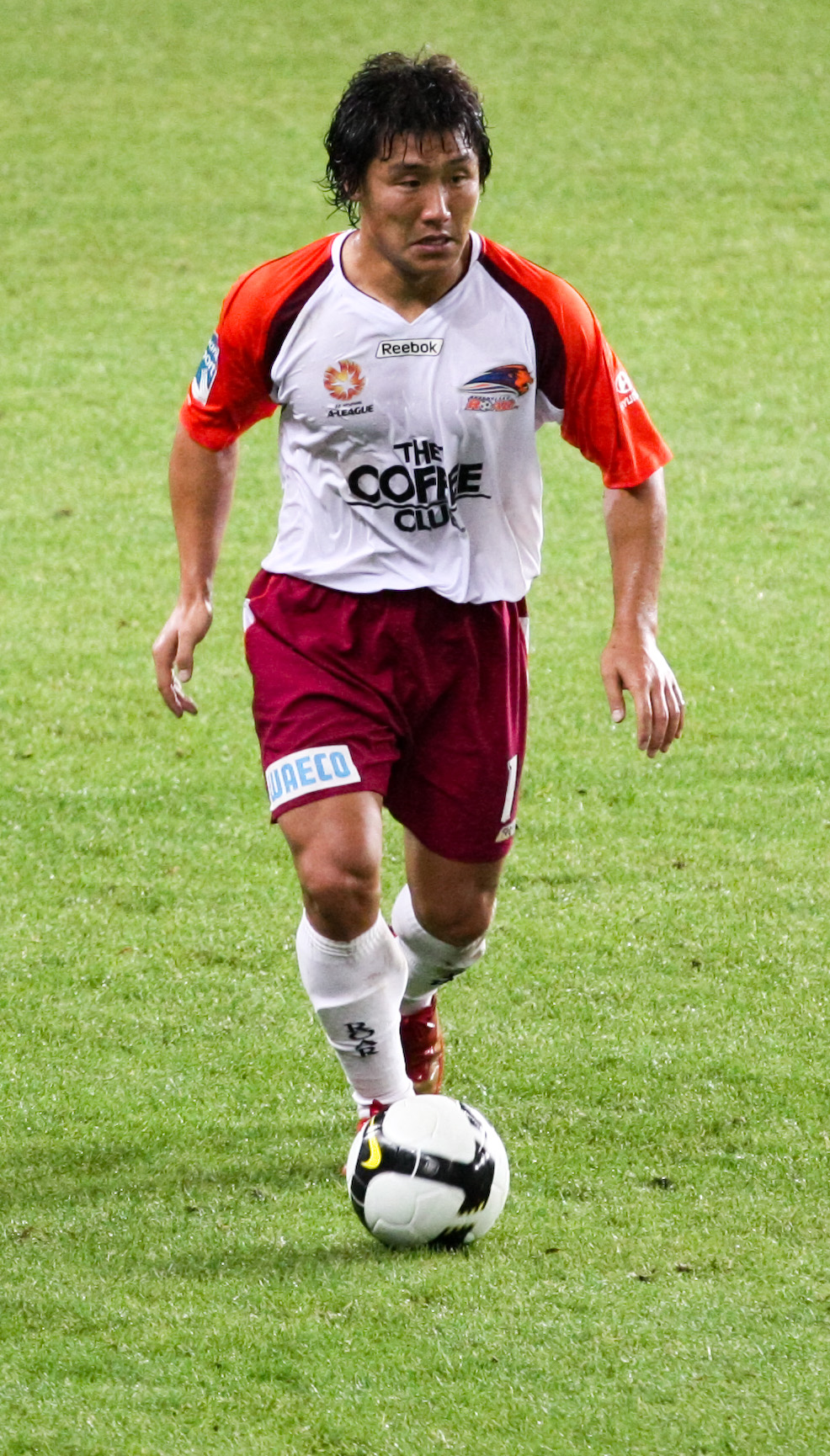

Personal information
- Full name: Seo Hyuk-Su
- Date of birth: October 1, 1973 (age 53)
- Place of birth: Jecheon, Chungbuk, South Korea
- Height: 1.78 m (5 ft 10 in)
- Positions: Right back; central midfielder

Youth career
- Kyunghee University

Senior career*
Years	Team	Apps	(Gls)
1996–1997	Hanil Bank FC		
1998–2003	Jeonbuk Hyundai Motors	146	(3)
2004	Seongnam Ilhwa Chunma	17	(0)
2005–2009	Brisbane Roar	72	(2)
2009–2010	Brisbane Olympic United		

Managerial career
- 2016–: Jeju International University
- * Club domestic league appearances and goals as of February 17, 2009 ‡ National team caps and goals as of 2 December 2007

- Seo Hyuk-su
- Hangul: 서혁수
- Hanja: 徐爀秀
- RR: Seo Hyeoksu
- MR: Sŏ Hyŏksu

Seo Hyuk-Su (born October 1, 1973, in Jecheon, South Korea) is a Korean-Australian former footballer.

== Biography ==
=== Club career ===
Hyuk-Su Seo played every second of the inaugural A-League season and has currently played the equal second-greatest number of games for the Queensland Roar along with Massimo Murdocca, as of January 2009, behind Matt McKay. He became an Australian citizen in 2007. The 35-year-old Queensland Roar foundation player was released from his contract, after 4 years with the Roar. Seo was a highly valued member of the team and a fan favourite during his time with the club.

== Club career statistics ==
Club performance			League		Cup		League Cup		Continental		Total	
Season	Club	League	Apps	Goals	Apps	Goals	Apps	Goals	Apps	Goals	Apps	Goals
South Korea			League		KFA Cup		League Cup		Asia		Total	
1998	Jeonbuk Hyundai Motors	K-League	16	0	?	0	10	0	-		26	0
1999	Jeonbuk Hyundai Motors	K-League	25	1	5	0	9	4	-		39	5
2000	Jeonbuk Hyundai Motors	K-League	24	0	4	1	8	0	-		36	1
2001	Jeonbuk Hyundai Motors	K-League	25	0	?	0	9	0	?	0	34	0
2002	Jeonbuk Hyundai Motors	K-League	25	0	?	0	6	0	-		31	0
2003	Jeonbuk Hyundai Motors	K-League	31	2	4	2	-		-		35	4
2004	Seongnam Ilhwa Chunma	K-League	17	0	1	0	11	0	?	?	29	0
Australia			League		Cup		League Cup		Oceania/Asia		Total	
2005–06	Brisbane Roar	A-League	21	2			-		-		21	2
2006–07	Brisbane Roar	A-League	21	0			-		-		21	0
2007–08	Brisbane Roar	A-League	17	0			-		-		17	0
2008–09	Brisbane Roar	A-League	13	0			-		-		13	0
2010	Brisbane Olympic United	Brisbane Premier League										
Total	South Korea		163	3	14	3	53	4	0	0	230	10
Total	Australia		72	2			-		0	0	72	2
Career total			235	5	14	3	53	4	0	0	302	12

== Honours ==
Personal honours:

- Queensland Roar Gary Wilkins Medal: 2005–2006
- Queensland Roar Player's Player of the Year: 2005–2006
