= Todd Gava =

Australian soccer player (born 1981)

Personal information
- Full name: Todd Gava
- Date of birth: 20 January 1981 (age 45)
- Place of birth: Lismore, New South Wales, Australia
- Height: 1.75 m (5 ft 9 in)
- Position: Midfielder

Senior career*
Years	Team	Apps	(Gls)
2001–2004	Queensland Lions		
2005–2006	Queensland Roar	9	(0)
2006–2009	Brisbane Strikers		
2010	Eastern Suburbs		
2011–2013	Peninsula Power		
2014–2016	Rochedale Rovers	36	(3)
- * Club domestic league appearances and goals as of 14 September 2016

Todd Gava (born 20 January 1981) is an Australian soccer player.
