= Reinaldo (footballer, born 1984) =

Brazilian footballer

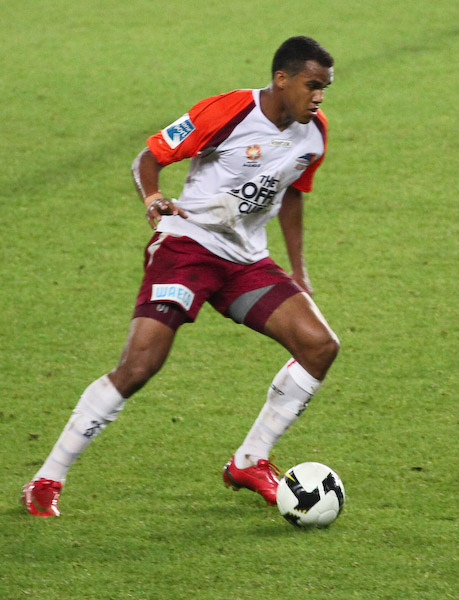

Personal information
- Full name: Reinaldo Elias da Costa
- Date of birth: 13 June 1984 (age 42)
- Place of birth: Itaberaí, Brazil
- Height: 1.94 m (6 ft 4 in)
- Position: Striker

Senior career*
Years	Team	Apps	(Gls)
2004	América Mineiro	13	(10)
2005	Corinthians Alagoano	24	(20)
2005	→ Brisbane Roar (loan)	6	(2)
2006–2008	Brisbane Roar	41	(13)
2008	Busan I'Park	18	(8)
2008–2010	Brisbane Roar	45	(9)
2011	Al-Wakra	19	(9)
2011–2012	Al-Raed	14	(7)
2012	Beijing Guoan	17	(5)
2013–2014	Operário	19	(10)
2015	Caxias	11	(1)
2015–2016	Sime Darby	20	(11)
2016	Operário	7	(0)
2017	PSM Makassar	17	(9)
2017	Persija Jakarta	5	(3)
Total		276	(117)
- * Club domestic league appearances and goals

Reinaldo Elias da Costa /heɪnældoʊ/ (born 13 June 1984), known in Brazil as Reinaldo or Reinaldo Mineiro, is a Brazilian former footballer.

== Club career ==
Born in Itabirito, Brazil, Reinaldo plays as a striker and started his professional football career at Brazilian club América Mineiro in 2004, where he became a key player and the club's leading goal scorer. Later that season he trialed with Dutch club Feyenoord for two months until he was signed by Corinthians Alagoano.

In his first year for Corinthians, Reinaldo scored 18 goals and helped them advance to the second stage of the league. While in Australia, A-League side Queensland Roar had been struggling for goals all season and opted to buy a player on a loan rather than a transfer as the window was closed. Even with exciting goal scoring product Alex Brosque, Queensland lacked something in front of goal.

=== Brisbane Roar ===
Searching for a striker who could save Queensland's season by scoring goals on a regular basis, their scouts were recommended Reinaldo and after watching several DVDs of the striker, Roar signed him for a six-game loan. Reinaldo scored two goals and was impressive in all six matches on his short-term loan for Queensland, but it was all too late for the Roar who missed out on the finals.

During the off-season of the A-league, Queensland lost Golden Boot winner Alex Brosque who transferred to 2005–06 champions Sydney FC and although Brosque won the inaugural Golden Boot Award, his inconsistency lead to the club accepting his departure. Queensland rewarded Reinaldo with a two-year contract, after negotiations with Corinthians.

In the 2006–07 season, Reinaldo was a valuable member of the squad but admitted at the end of the season he thought his season was a failure after scoring only 4 goals in 18 matches. They just missed out on the finals that year in heartbreaking circumstances.

==== 2007–08 season ====
Before the start of the 2007–08 season, Reinaldo stated that this was to be his "do-or-die" season and he was ready for a big year. Unable to score goals at the start of the season, Reinaldo was low on confidence and was criticised by the media and Roar fans. However, in round 11 against Adelaide United, Reinaldo broke his drought and scored after belting home a powerful volley from just inside the box. He then scored a further two goals against Wellington Phoenix, including a back heel from a low cross from Matt McKay. He scored another seven goals helping the Roar onto its maiden A-League Finals campaign.

After an indifferent season for Reinaldo which included the club's Golden Boot Award with nine goals, he then went into the A-League and Brisbane Roar history books when he scored what is said to be one of the greatest goals in the A-League's history. He received a Craig Moore cross on the half-way line and dribbled the ball at pace down the left flank, beating Sydney defender Mark Milligan with a neat turn and slotting the ball into the top right hand corner of the net from an acute angle. The amazing finish helped the Roar advance to the preliminary final.

==== Departure and return ====
Reinaldo was sold to Korean K-League side Busan I'Park following the end of the 2007/08 A-League Season, due to his desire to develop his football in Asia. A fee was agreed between Busan I'Park and QLD Roar and Reinaldo agreed a two-year contract with the Korean Club. However, for personal reasons, Reinaldo left Busan I'Park on a mutual termination agreement and returned to Queensland Roar for the 2008/09 A-League Season. He signed a 3-year contract with the club and was unveiled again on 31 July 2008.

He played his 50th game for the Roar in the 4–2 loss against the Central Coast Mariners in Round 3 at Suncorp Stadium in the 2008–09 season. He last played in Round 9 that season and missed the rest of the season due to a severe bout of osteitis pubis. In September 2010 Reinaldo became an Australian citizen.

=== Arab clubs ===
It was reported that Reinaldo would leave the Roar and go play in Qatar for Al-Wakra on a two-year deal worth almost $2 million. He made 10 appearances, scoring 6 goals before moving to Saudi Arabia with Al-Raed.

=== China ===
During the 2012 January transfer window, it was announced that Chinese Super League club Beijing Guoan had bought the striker from Saudi Club Al-Raed for a reported $2 million over two years.

In January 2013, it was reported that Reinaldo was loaned to China League One side Chengdu Blades for one year. However, he eventually stayed in Beijing for the 2013 season.

=== Brazil ===
Reinaldo was signed to Campeonato Brasileiro Série D side Operário Ferroviário Esporte Clube on 8 March 2013.

== Playing style ==
Reinaldo is primarily a target man, holding up the ball to bring others into play. However, he possesses more flair than the typical target man and frequently dribbles and runs at defenders. He is well known for his trade-mark back flip celebrations and his Robinho-like thumb sucking celebration.

== Personal life ==
Reinaldo has dual citizenship, having gained an Australian passport.
