= Geoffrey Claeys =

Belgian footballer (born 1974)

Personal information
- Date of birth: 5 October 1974 (age 52)
- Place of birth: Bruges, Belgium
- Height: 6 ft 1 in (1.85 m)
- Position: Centre-back

Team information
- Current team: FC Kleit-Maldegem (manager)

Senior career*
Years	Team	Apps	(Gls)
1992–1996	Cercle Brugge	77	(6)
1996–1998	Feyenoord	45	(0)
1998–1999	Anderlecht	9	(0)
1999–2000	→ Eendracht Aalst (loan)	28	(1)
2000–2001	Lierse	25	(3)
2001–2005	Excelsior Mouscron	79	(6)
2005–2006	Melbourne Victory	16	(0)
2007–2008	Torhout 1992 KM		
2009	FC Veldegem		

International career
1996–1998	Belgium	3	(1)

Managerial career
- 2012–2015: Deinze (assistant)
- 2015–2016: Deinze
- 2016–2019: Melbourne Victory (youth)
- 2019–: FC Kleit-Maldegem
- * Club domestic league appearances and goals

Geoffrey Claeys (born 5 October 1974) is a Belgian football manager and former player who manages FC Kleit-Maldegem. He is a former Belgian international.

== Career ==
Claeys was born in Bruges, Belgium. He began his career at the Belgian club Cercle Brugge. He left the club in 1996 for Dutch side Feyenoord, then he made an unsuccessful move to Anderlecht and was transferred to Eendracht Aalst on loan. He later played for Lierse and Royal Excelsior Mouscron, before moving to Melbourne Victory in 2005. Although he enjoyed a solid season in the Victory defence, he rarely figured in the 2006–07 season.

On 21 November 2006, Claeys retired from football. In 2007, he returned to play for Torhout 1992 KM, in the Belgian Third Division before retiring soon after.

In 2009, he picked up football again, after his brother asked him to become his teammate at FC Veldegem. Veldegem plays in the provincial leagues of West Flanders.
