= Osvaldo Carro =

Uruguayan football player (born 1973)

Personal information
- Full name: Osvaldo Aurelio Carro Carro
- Date of birth: 23 October 1973 (age 53)
- Place of birth: Colonia, Uruguay
- Position: Attacking midfielder

Senior career*
Years	Team	Apps	(Gls)
1990–1996	Juventud de Las Piedras		
1997–1998	Fenix		
2001	Macará		
2001–2005	Plaza Colonia		
2005–2006	Queensland Roar	9	(0)
2006–2008	Plaza Colonia		
- * Club domestic league appearances and goals as of April 2008

Osvaldo Carro (born 23 October 1973, in Colonia) was a Uruguayan football player who played as an attacking midfielder.

== Career ==
Carro began playing professional football with Juventud de Las Piedras in 1990. After six seasons with Juventud he joined Montevideo side Centro Atlético Fenix for two seasons. Spells abroad in Ecuador and Australia followed.

Carro spent most of his career playing in Uruguay but he played abroad for the Queensland Roar in the Australian A-League and Macará in Ecuador.
