= Matthew Breeze =

Australian association football referee

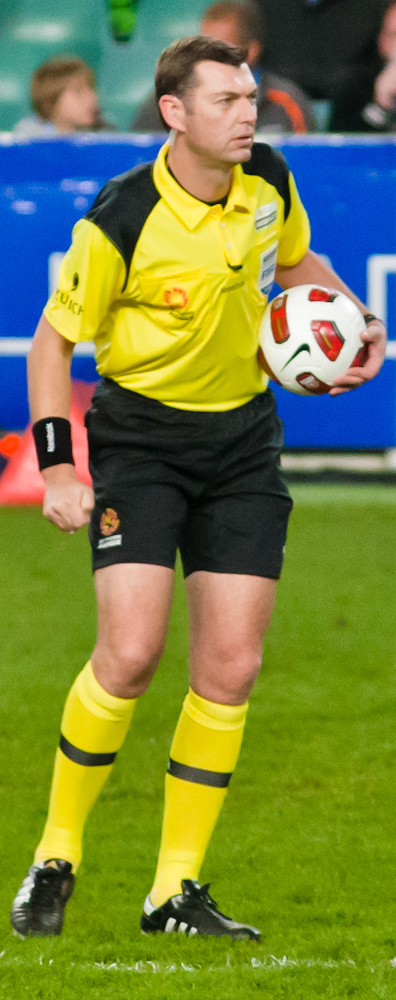
- A photograph of Matthew Breeze on the football pitch
- Full name: Matthew Christopher Breeze
- Born: 10 June 1972 (age 54); Sydney, Australia
- Other occupation: Barrister

Domestic
Years	League	Role
1994-2004	National Soccer League	Referee
2005-	A-League	Referee

International
Years	League	Role
2001-2012	FIFA listed	Referee

Matthew Christopher Breeze (born 10 June 1972) is an Australian association football referee. He is also a barrister and a former police prosecutor.

== Refereeing career ==
=== Domestic career ===
He officiates in the Australian A-League football competition. On 28 February 2009, in the 2009 A-League Grand Final, Breeze sent off Adelaide United striker Cristiano after his arm made contact with Melbourne Victory defender Rodrigo Vargas. The red card was rescinded after the game and the FFA chose not to sanction Cristiano.

==== Awards ====
Year	Award
2008–09	Zurich Referee of the Year
2010–11	Zurich Referee of the Year

==== A-League Matches ====
- 2005/2006 Season: 22 Matches (Including: 2 Pre-season; Major Semi-Final 1st Leg; Preliminary Final)
- 2006/2007 Season: 25 Matches (Including: 3 Pre-season; Minor Semi-Final 2nd Leg; Preliminary Final)
- 2007/2008 Season: 18 Matches (Including: Major Semi-Final 1st leg)
- 2008/2009 Season: 19 Matches (Including: 1 Pre-season; Major Semi-Final 2nd Leg; Final: Melbourne Victory - Adelaide United)
- 2009/2010 Season: 20 Matches (Including: Minor Semi-Final; Semi-Final)

=== International career ===
Breeze presided in his first international between Fiji and Vanuatu on 11 April 2000, which Fiji won 4–1.

Breeze made the short-list of 44 referees to preside at the 2006 FIFA World Cup, but missed the final cut. His highest honour remains officiating at the 2005 Confederations Cup in Germany where he refereed the Third Place Playoff.

He was one of two Australian referees who officiated at the 2007 Asian Cup, the other being Mark Shield.

He was preselected as a referee for the 2010 FIFA World Cup. However, he was not chosen to take part in the Event.

Breeze refereed the Third Place Playoff at the 2009 FIFA Confederations Cup.

==== International Matches ====
World Cup Qualifier 2002

- 13-6-2001 Tahiti - Solomon Islands (1st Stage)

OFC Nations Cup 2002

- 5-7-2002: Papua New Guinea - Solomon Islands (1st Round)
- 7-7-2002: Solomon Islands - Auckland City FC (1st Round)
- 12-7-2002: New Zealand - Vanuatu (semi-final)

FIFA Under 20 World Cup 2003

- 29-11-2003: Saudi Arabia - Ireland (group stage)
- 2-12-2003: Japan - Colombia (group stage)
- 5-12-2003: USA - Korea Republic (group stage)
- 19-12-2003: Colombia - Argentina (3rd Place Play-off)

OFC Nations Cup 2004

- 10-5-2004: Papua New Guinea - Vanuatu
- 15-5-2004: Samoa - Vanuatu
- 19-5-2004: Fiji - Vanuatu

World Cup Qualifiers 2006 – Oceania

- 10-5-2004: Papua New Guinea - Vanuatu (1st Stage)
- 15-5-2004: Samoa - Vanuatu (1st Stage)
- 19-5-2004: Fiji - Vanuatu (1st Stage)

FIFA Confederations Cup 2005

- 16-6-2005: Japan - Mexico (group stage)
- 29-6-2005: Germany - Mexico (3rd Place Play-off)

Asian Cup 2007

- 9-7-2007: Japan - Qatar (group stage)
- 16-7-2007: Vietnam - Japan (group stage)
- 25-7-2007: Japan - Saudi Arabia

FIFA Under 17 World Cup 2007

- 19-8-2007: Honduras - Spain (group stage)
- 25-8-2007: Nigeria - Haiti (group stage)
- 29-8-2007: Peru - Tajikistan (round of 16)
- 2-9-2007: Argentina - Nigeria (Quarter Final)

AFC Final Round (Olympic Teams)

- 28-2-2007: Uzbekistan - United Arab Emirates (2nd Stage)
- 14-3-2007: Lebanon - Oman (2nd Stage)

World Cup Qualifiers 2010 – Oceania

- 21-11-2007: New Caledonia - Fiji (2nd Stage)

OFC Nations Cup 2008

- 21-11-2008: New Caledonia - Fiji

AFC Champions League 2008

- 23-4-2008: Al Karama - Al Sadd SC (group stage)
- 7-5-2008: Kashima Antlers - Krung Thai Bank FC (group stage)
- 17-9-2008: Al Karama - Gamba Osaka (Quarter Final)

World Cup Qualifiers 2010 – Asia

- 26-3-2008: Kuwait - Iran
- 14-6-2008: Uzbekistan - Lebanon (3rd Stage)
- 15-10-2008: Korea Republic - United Arab Emirates (4th Stage)
- 28-3-2009: Korea DPR - United Arab Emirates

AFC Champions League 2009

- 11-3-2009: Shanghai Shenhua - Singapore Armed Forces (group stage)
- 8-4-2009: Persepolis - Al Gharafa (group stage)
- 5-5-2009: Al Shabab Al Arabi - Sepahan (group stage)
- 20-5-2009: Gamba Osaka - FC Seoul (group stage)
- 7-11-2009: Al Ittihad - Pohang Steelers (final)

FIFA Confederations Cup 2009

- 17-6-2009: Spain - Iraq (group stage)
- 28-6-2009: Spain - South Africa (3rd Place Play-off)

2009 Club World Cup

- 19-12-2009: Pohang Steelers - Atlante FC (3rd Place Play-off)

Asian Cup 2011 Qualifier

- 22-11-2009: China - Lebanon

AFC Champions League 2010

- 24-2-2010: Suwon Samsung Bluewings - Gamba Osaka (group stage)
- 13-4-2010: Pakhtakor - Al Ain (group stage)
- 5-10-2010: Al Shabab - Seongnam Ilhwa Chunma (Semi Final)

2010 Sydney Festival of Football

- 28-7-2010: Sydney FC - Rangers
- 31-7-2010: AEK Athens - Rangers

The QANTAS Challenge

- 27-11-2010: Newcastle Jets - Los Angeles Galaxy
