= Mark Shield =

Australian soccer referee

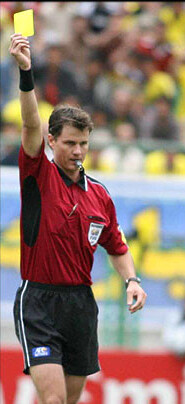
- Full name: Mark Alexander Shield
- Born: 2 September 1973 (age 53); Fortitude Valley, Queensland, Australia

Domestic
Years	League	Role
1995–2004	National Soccer League	Referee
2005–2008	A-League	Referee

International
Years	League	Role
1999–2008	FIFA listed	Referee

Mark Shield (born 2 September 1973) is a former Australian soccer referee who officiated in the top tier of Australian soccer between 1995 and 2005. Shield was FIFA listed between 1999 and 2008, and was in control of matches at the 2002 and 2006 FIFA World Cup finals. He refereed the finals of the 2006 AFC Champions League and the 2007 AFC Asian Cup. After retiring, he served as national director of referees.

== Early life ==
Shield was born in 1973 in Fortitude Valley, Queensland. His father was an engineer who moved often for work, so Shield grew up in a number of towns in Queensland. He first played soccer for the Innisfail Tigers at the age of six. Not showing much promise as a player, he began refereeing at age 12, and was officiating adult matches in his mid-teens in Townsville.

== Refereeing career ==
At age 28, he was selected to serve as a referee for the 2002 FIFA World Cup. He was one of 23 referees selected to officiate the 2006 FIFA World Cup. Shield announced his retirement from refereeing on 20 September 2008 and he refereed his last game in Round 8 of the 2008/09 A-League season in the match between Queensland Roar and Adelaide United.

=== 2002 World Cup ===
Shield served as an official at the 2002 FIFA World Cup in Korea and Japan. On 10 June 2002 he officiated the 1-1 draw between Belgium and Tunisia.

=== 2006 World Cup ===
Shield was selected to referee at the 2006 FIFA World Cup in Germany. He officiated the Iran-Angola match and the Saudi Arabia-Tunisia match, both in group play.

Shield was also selected as one of the final 12 officials eligible to officiate the final eight matches of the tournament.

=== Asian Champions League Final ===
In late 2006, Shield was appointed to referee the second leg of the AFC Champions League final between Al Karama (Syria) and Jeonbuk Hyundai Motors (South Korea) was played on Wednesday 8 November at the Khaled Bin Al Waleed Stadium. Jeonbuk Motors won the AFC Champions League after Brazilian striker Ze Carlo's 88th-minute header gave them a 3-2 aggregate victory over Al Karama. Al Karama won the second leg of the final 2-1 but the Brazilian's late goal made the difference after the Koreans won the first leg 2-0.

=== Asian Cup 2007 ===
Shield was appointed with fellow Australian referee Matthew Breeze to referee at the 2007 Asian Cup. Australia was the only country with more than one representative on the panel of referees for the tournament. While at the tournament, he was selected for a number of matches including the final between Iraq and Saudi Arabia, whilst Breeze was selected to referee a semi-final match. Both were fortunate that the Australian team were knocked out in the quarter-finals because they would not have been able to referee matches involving or affecting their own country in the latter stages.

=== Hyundai Club Challenge ===
Shield received creditable reviews for his performance in the one-off game between Sydney FC and Los Angeles Galaxy at Sydney's Telstra Stadium on 27 November 2007 (the attendance of 80,295 is Australia's largest for a club game). In an exhibition match won 5-3 by the home team, Shield sent off LA Galaxy defender Kevin Harmse and also booked Beckham for a retaliatory lunge at Sydney's Robbie Middleby.

=== FIFA Club World Cup 2007 ===
Shield officiated in the quarter-final between Étoile Sportive du Sahel and Pachuca in front of 34,934 fans at the National Stadium, Tokyo. He was also named as the fourth official in the final between Boca Juniors and A.C. Milan.

=== National Soccer League (NSL) ===
Shield made his professional debut just a month after his 22nd birthday, refereeing the Sydney United vs West Adelaide match in the old National Soccer League on 8 October 1995 at the Sydney United Sports Centre. He refereed 3 NSL Grand Finals.

=== A-League ===
Mark Shield was on the A-League Referees Panel at the start of the 2008/09 A-League season.

On 19 September 2008, The Sydney Morning Herald reported that he was considering retirement. He did not referee in Round 4 of the 2008/09 A-League season, nor was he scheduled to referee in Round 5 that weekend. He refereed his final match in the Round 8 match between Queensland Roar and Adelaide United. Shield Refereed the first three A-League Finals before retiring (2006, 2007 and 2008), refereeing a total of six consecutive domestic league finals in Australia.

A-League Matches:

- 2005/2006 Season: 19 Matches (Including: 2 Pre-season; Major Semi-final 2nd Leg; Final: Sydney FC - Central Coast Mariners)
- 2006/2007 Season: 19 Matches (Including: 1 Pre-season; Major Semi-final 2nd Leg; Final: Melbourne Victory - Adelaide United)
- 2007/2008 Season: 17 Matches (Including: Minor Semi-final (both legs); Final: Central Coast Mariners - Newcastle Jets)
- 2008/2009 Season: 6 Matches (Including: 1 Pre-season. Shields Last A-League match was played in Round 8)

== Post refereeing Career ==
Shield was admitted to the FFA Hall of Fame in 2010. In September 2011, Football Federation Australia appointed Shield as the new national Director of Referees, giving him responsibility for coaching and development of referees as well as appointment of referees to national competitions including the A-League.

Shield left the position in September 2012 after announcing that he would not be renewing his contract after being offered a CEO role in another industry.

Currently playing over 30s football in Mackay, Queensland. Representing Mackay Dolphins FC.

== Notes ==
Preceded by AFC Asian Cup Final 2004 (Kuwait) Saad Kamil Al-Fadhli	AFC Asian Cup Final Referees; Final 2007 (Australia) Mark Alexander Shield	Succeeded by AFC Asian Cup Final 2011 (Uzbekistan) Ravshan Irmatov
