= Michael Baird (soccer) =

Australian soccer player striker

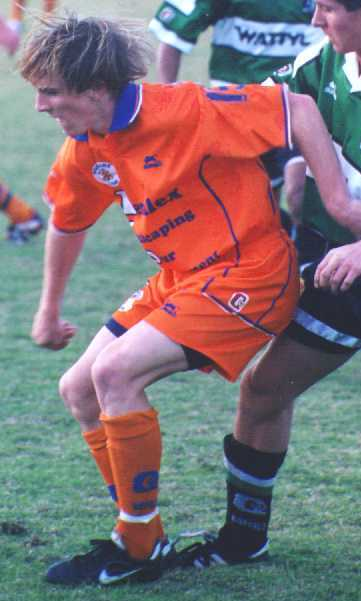

Personal information
- Full name: Michael William Baird
- Date of birth: 1 August 1983 (age 43)
- Place of birth: Brisbane, Australia
- Height: 1.80 m (5 ft 11 in)
- Positions: Forward; attacking midfielder

Team information
- Current team: Narangba Eagles

Youth career
- 1987–: Newmarket SFC
- Pine Hills
- The Gap

Senior career*
Years	Team	Apps	(Gls)
2000–2001	Brisbane Lions	17	(7)
2001–2002	Brisbane Strikers	14	(7)
2002–2003	South Melbourne	18	(6)
2003–2004	Sydney Olympic	11	(4)
2004	→ Queensland Lions	7	(2)
2004–2005	Bonnyrigg White Eagles	13	(7)
2005–2006	Brisbane Roar	14	(6)
2006–2009	Universitatea Craiova	67	(18)
2010–2011	Perth Glory	13	(1)
2011–2012	Central Coast Mariners	3	(0)
2012	Sabah FA	8	(4)
2013	Peninsula Power	19	(15)
2013	Universitatea Craiova	11	(1)
2014	PSM Makassar	11	(3)
2015–2016	Rochedale Rovers	28	(12)
2017–2018	Peninsula Power	6	(2)
2018	North Pine United	1	(0)
2021–	Narangba Eagles	9	(4)

International career
2002–2004	Australia U-20	10	(4)
Medal record
Representing Australia
Men's Association football
OFC U-20 Championship
Winner	Fiji/Vanuatu 2002
- * Club domestic league appearances and goals as of 25 June 2019

Michael William Baird (born 1 August 1983 in Brisbane, Australia) is an Australian soccer player striker. Michael has played in both the National Soccer League (NSL) and the A-League, spending time at clubs in New South Wales and Queensland. The young striker then moved overseas to play with Universitatea Craiova in the Romanian top flight; however, due to a contract dispute, he moved back to Australia to compete in the A-League for Perth Glory missing out on the first 3 rounds of the 2010/2011 season due to his lack of provisional clearance by FIFA.

== Club career ==
Michael Baird was born in Newmarket, Brisbane and began playing football at the age of five, with his local club, Newmarket SFC. In 2000, he began his professional career, with the Brisbane Lions Soccer Club (now known as Queensland Lions FC) in the Brisbane Premier League. Baird stayed with them in 2001, and scored 7 goals from 17 games during the season. In 2001–02, Baird was promoted to the National Soccer League, signing with the Brisbane Strikers, with whom he scored 4 goals from 15 appearances. The club finished fourth on the league table, but at the end of the season Baird signed with the team who had defeated the Strikers in the elimination final, South Melbourne FC for 2002–03. Meanwhile, Baird made 18 appearances for South Melbourne in the 2002–03 NSL season, scoring 4 goals as they finished 7th, one point shy of the finals.

Upon returning to Australia, Baird completed the 2003–04 season with Sydney Olympic, picking up 2 goals in his 11 appearances. Baird returned briefly to the Queensland Lions for the 2004 QPL season, helping the team to the premiership before transferring to the Bonnyrigg White Eagles in the New South Wales Premier League.

In late 2004, Baird received offers from new A-League clubs Queensland Roar and the Central Coast Mariners, but made the decision to sign with his home club, thus becoming one of the first recruits for the Roar. Baird played in Queensland's 3–0 loss to Sydney FC in the Australian qualifiers for the 2004–05 Oceania Club Championship, but in late June he was struck with osteitis pubis, and it was feared he would miss the start of the inaugural A-League season. However, despite not playing in Queensland's Pre-Season Cup matches, Baird was fit in time for their first A-League game, scoring the final goal in their 2–0 win over the New Zealand Knights. Baird made a total of 20 appearances for the Roar in the 2005–06 season, scoring 6 goals and earning a red card in a round 14 match against the Mariners. Late in the season, Baird was released from the second year of his Roar contract to sign a four-year deal with Romanian club FC Universitatea Craiova, and finished off his A-League career with a goal in his final game. On 15 April 2010 it was confirmed that Baird along with his FC Universitatea Craiova teammate Josh Mitchell had returned home to sign for A-League side Perth Glory. After Struggling to make an impact with Perth Glory it was announced that on 6 January 2011 that Central Coast Mariners had signed the forward until the end of the 2011–2012 season.

On 17 November 2011, Baird joined the Malaysian club, Sabah FA as one of the two foreign players allowed in the 2012 Malaysia Super League. Baird, alongside his fellow countrymen, Brendan Gan signed a one-year contract Sabah. Baird scored 4 goals in 8 appearances for Sabah.

In August 2013, Baird came back with Romanian club, FC Universitatea Craiova here Baird Score 3 goals in 14 appearances for FC Universitatea Craiova and has terminated the contract with them in December 2013.

In January 2014, Baird joined Indonesian club, PSM Makassar. His contract was terminated after the 2014 Indonesia Super League finished.

== International career ==
At the age of 19, Baird was selected in the Australian national team to play in the Oceania Football Confederation qualifying matches for the 2003 FIFA World Youth Championship. He played in Australia's first match, a 2–0 victory over Vanuatu, then scored 4 goals in an 11-0 thrashing of Fiji in the first leg of the tournament final.

Baird was selected in the 20-man squad to represent Australia in the 2003 World Youth Championship, also playing in Australia's 2–0 victory over the United Arab Emirates in the leadup to the tournament. During the competition, however, Baird only managed a 32-minute appearance in Australia's 2–1 win over Canada, preferred behind Alex Brosque, Scott McDonald and Spase Dilevski. Australia finished on top of their group with 7 points, including a surprise victory over Brazil, before losing 1-0 to the hosts, the United Arab Emirates in the round of sixteen.

== Honours ==
Australia U-20

- OFC U-19 Men's Championship: 2002
