= Reece Tollenaere =

Australian soccer player

Personal information
- Full name: Reece Tollenaere
- Date of birth: 27 June 1977 (age 49)
- Place of birth: Tweed Heads, New South Wales, Australia
- Height: 1.82 m (5 ft 11 1/2 in)
- Position: Striker

Senior career*
Years	Team	Apps	(Gls)
1995–1999	Brisbane Strikers	35	(4)
1997–1998	Newcastle Breakers	9	(6)
- VV Huizen
2001–2005	Queensland Lions	61	(74)
2005–2006	Queensland Roar	3	(0)
2007–2008	Brisbane Strikers		
2009–2010	Eastern Suburbs		
- * Club domestic league appearances and goals as of 5 August 2011

Reece Tollenaere (born 27 June 1977) is an Australian footballer who plays as a striker.

== Biography ==
He has played for the Queensland Roar in the A-League competition, and in the National Soccer League for Brisbane Strikers and Newcastle Breakers. Reece was signed by the Brisbane Strikers FC in the National Soccer League at the age of 17 after a successful two-year stint with the Queensland Academy of Sport, in which he won the NYL top goalscorer award with 23 goals in just 18 appearances.

In his early days with the Strikers he played predominantly as a wide midfielder under the guidance of Frank Farina and was a part of the Brisbane Strikers team to win the Ericsson Cup (NSL title) in the 1996/97 season. He was a part of the Australian under-20 squad and played three matches for his country before missing out on the final Youth World Cup squad in 1997.

In early 1998, whilst contracted to the Strikers, Reece transferred on loan to the Newcastle Breakers for the final 9 games of the season. He played in each game scoring 6 goals, which included a hat-trick against Perth Glory in a 4–3 win and a goal against the Strikers to deny his former team of a win. Reece returned to his hometown and the Strikers the next season with the Newcastle Breakers coach John Kosmina. Although the season started brightly with a headed goal against Marconi-Fairfield, he suffered a fracture to the ankle in the third game of the season against Sydney Olympic and struggled for the remainder of the season, requiring surgery to remove floating bone.

Reece suffered multiple facial fractures in a head clash in only his third game of the inaugural A-League season whilst playing for the Roar and was forced to miss the remainder of the season, undergoing two facial reconstructions.

After a long absence from the game he continued his playing career with the Brisbane Strikers, halfway through the 2006 Brisbane Premier League season. He managed to score 12 goals in as many games with the club helping the Strikers to the Premiership and Grand Final win with a double in the final. Reece continued playing for the Brisbane Strikers in 2007 and 2008 in both a striker and midfield role and has proved to be a prolific goalscorer.

Reece has a bachelor's degree in Science from the Queensland University of Technology, majoring in Biotechnology, a Bachelor of Science Honours in Genetics from the University of Queensland, and a Diploma of Business in Marketing.
