= 2005–06 Sydney FC season =

Sydney FC
2005–06 season
- Chairman: Walter Bugno
- Manager: Pierre Littbarski
- Stadium: Aussie Stadium
- A-League: 2nd
- A-League Finals: Champions
- Oceania Club World Cup Qualifying: Champions
- Oceania Club Championship: Champions
- Pre-Season Cup: Semi-finals
- FIFA Club World Cup: 5th
- Top goalscorer: League: Sasho Petrovski (9); All: Sasho Petrovski (18)
- Highest home attendance: 41,689 v Central Coast Mariners; 5 March 2006
- Lowest home attendance: 9,132 v Newcastle; 30 October 2005
- Average home league attendance: 0
Home colours	Away colours

The 2005-06 season was Sydney FC's first season, formed to compete in the new Australian A-League competition. The club finished second on the table in the regular season, and won the first A-League Grand Final, defeating Central Coast Mariners 1–0. Sydney also represented Oceania at the FIFA Club World Championship 2005 where they were placed fifth.

== Players ==
=== Squad ===
Note: Flags indicate national team as defined under FIFA eligibility rules; some limited exceptions apply. Players may hold more than one non-FIFA nationality.

No.	Pos.	Nation	Player
1	GK	AUS	Clint Bolton
2	DF	AUS	Iain Fyfe
3	DF	AUS	Alvin Ceccoli
4	DF	AUS	Mark Rudan
5	DF	AUS	Steve Laurie
6	MF	AUS	Ufuk Talay
7	MF	AUS	Robbie Middleby
8	MF	AUS	Matthew Bingley
9	FW	AUS	David Zdrilic
10	MF	AUS	Steve Corica
11	FW	AUS	Sasho Petrovski
12	MF	AUS	David Carney

No.	Pos.	Nation	Player
13	FW	USA	Alejandro Salazar
14	MF	AUS	Andrew Packer
15	MF	NIR	Terry McFlynn
16	DF	AUS	Mark Milligan
17	DF	AUS	Jacob Timpano
18	DF	AUS	Wade Oostendorp
19	FW	TTO	Dwight Yorke
20	GK	AUS	Justin Pasfield
21	FW	JPN	Kazuyoshi Miura (guest player)
22	FW	AUS	John Buonavoglia (short-term signing)
23	MF	AUS	Ruben Zadkovich (short-term signing)
24	FW	AUS	Tolgay Özbey (short-term signing)

=== Transfers in ===
Player	From	Fee	Date
(Australia) Clint Bolton	APIA Leichhardt	Free	17 November 2004
(Australia) Alvin Ceccoli	Wollongong Wolves	Free	17 November 2004
(Australia) Steve Laurie	unattached	–	17 November 2004
(Australia) Robbie Middleby	unattached	–	17 November 2004
(Australia) Sasho Petrovski	Bankstown City Lions	Free	17 November 2004
(Australia) Andrew Packer	Queensland Lions	Free	17 November 2004
(Australia) Steve Corica	(England) Walsall	–	1 December 2004
(Australia) Mark Milligan	Blacktown City Demons	Free	4 December 2004
(Australia) Justin Pasfield	(Republic of Ireland) Bray Wanderers	–	4 December 2004
(Australia) Jacob Timpano	Wollongong Wolves	Free	4 December 2004
(Australia) Wade Oostendorp	AIS	–	4 December 2004
(Australia) Mark Rudan	(Malaysia) Public Bank	Free	9 December 2004
(United States) Alejandro Salazar	(United States) University of Portland	Free	9 December 2004
(Australia) David Zdrilic	(Germany) SV Eintracht Trier	–	13 December 2004
(Australia) Ufuk Talay	(Turkey) Mersin Idman Yurdu	–	5 January 2005
(Australia) Iain Fyfe	(Scotland) Hamilton Academical	–	16 February 2005
(Australia) David Carney	(Scotland) Hamilton Academical	–	11 March 2005
(Northern Ireland) Terry McFlynn	(England) Morecambe	–	12 March 2005
(Australia) Matthew Bingley	Central Coast United	Free	15 March 2005
(Trinidad and Tobago) Dwight Yorke	(England) Birmingham City	Free	16 April 2005

=== Short-term signings ===
Player	Transferred from	Type/Fee	Start date	End date
(Australia) Mitchell Blowes	(Australia) Kemblawarra FC	Loan signing for Oceania Club Championship	16 May 2005	30 June 2005
(Australia) Mitchell Blowes	(Australia) Kemblawarra FC	Loan signing for FIFA Club World Championship	29 November 2005	17 December 2005
(Australia) Todd Brodie	(Australia) Marconi Stallions	Loan signing for Oceania Club Championship	16 May 2005	30 June 2005
(Australia) Brendan Renaud	(Australia) St George Saints	Loan signing for Oceania Club Championship	16 May 2005	30 June 2005
(Australia) John Buonavoglia	(Australia) Sydney Olympic	Loan signing for Oceania Club Championship	16 May 2005	30 June 2005
(Australia) John Buonavoglia	(Australia) Sydney Olympic	International duty replacement for Sasho Petrovski	1 September 2005	3 September 2005
(Australia) John Buonavoglia	(Australia) Sydney Olympic	Injury replacement for Steve Laurie	4 October 2005	4 November 2005
(Australia) John Buonavoglia	(Australia) Sydney Olympic	Loan signing for FIFA Club World Championship	29 November 2005	17 December 2005
(Japan) Kazuyoshi Miura	(Japan) Yokohama FC	Guest player	4 November 2005	17 December 2005
(Australia) Dustin Wells	(Australia) Belconnen Blue Devils	Loan signing for FIFA Club World Championship	29 November 2005	17 December 2005
(Australia) Ruben Zadkovich	(England) Notts County	Loan signing for FIFA Club World Championship	29 November 2005	17 December 2005
(Australia) Ruben Zadkovich	(England) Notts County	Injury replacement for Ufuk Talay	21 January 2006	6 March 2006
(Australia) Tolgay Özbey	(Australia) Blacktown City Demons	Injury replacement for David Zdrilic	9 February 2006	6 March 2006

== Kits ==
All A-League club kits were supplied by Reebok through a sponsorship deal with the A-League, and all clubs initially had a white change strip, Sydney adopting a light blue trim to their away shirts. The home shirt colour of sky blue adopted the NSW representative colour, contrasted with the navy blue and orange trim.

Shirt sponsorship was secured with health insurance provider Healthe.

Home	Away	Goalkeeper

== Competitions ==
=== Overall ===
Competition	Started round	Final position / round	First match	Last match
Oceania Club Championship Qualification	Round 1	Champions	7 May 2005	15 May 2005
Oceania Club Championship	Group Stage	Champions	31 May 2005	10 June 2005
Pre-Season Challenge Cup	Group Stage	Semi-finals	23 July 2005	12 August 2005
A-League	Round 1	2nd	28 August 2005	3 February 2006
FIFA Club World Championship	Quarter-finals	5th	12 December 2005	16 December 2005
A-League Finals	Semi-finals	Champions	10 February 2006	5 March 2006

=== Oceania Club Championship Qualification ===
==== Matches ====
7 May 2005 Round 1	Sydney FC	3–0	Queensland Roar	Bluetongue Stadium, Gosford
		report		Attendance: 8,000

11 May 2005 Semi-final	Perth Glory	1–2	Sydney FC	Members Equity Stadium, Perth
		report		Attendance: 9,968

15 May 2005 Final	Central Coast Mariners	0–1	Sydney FC	Bluetongue Stadium, Gosford
		report		Attendance: 9,627

=== Oceania Club Championship ===
==== Group stage ====
Pos	Team	Pld	W	D	L	GF	GA	GD	Pts	Qualification
1	(Australia) Sydney FC	3	3	0	0	18	4	+14	9	Advance to knockout stage
2	(French Polynesia) AS Pirae	3	2	0	1	6	7	−1	6	Advance to knockout stage
3	(New Zealand) Auckland City	3	1	0	2	8	5	+3	3	
4	(Papua New Guinea) Sobou	3	0	0	3	4	20	−16	0	

Source: RSSSF

31 May 2005 1	Sydney FC (Australia)	3–2	(New Zealand) Auckland City	Stade Pater, Tahiti
	Ceccoli 32'; Packer 47'; Corica 90+3'	report	Seaman 37'; Smith 78'	Attendance: 4,000

2 June 2005 2	Sobou FC (Papua New Guinea)	2–9	(Australia) Sydney FC	Stade Pater, Tahiti
	Wate 57'; Daniel 90'	report	Fyfe 5'; Petrovski 14', 43', 71'; Zdrilic 19', 40', 42'; Brodie 79'; Salazar 82'	Attendance: 3,000

4 June 2005 3	Sydney FC (Australia)	6–0	(French Polynesia) AS Pirae	Stade Pater, Tahiti
	Zdrilic 11', 25', 35', 39'; Buonavoglia 43'; Carney 85'	report		Attendance: 1,500

==== Knockout stage ====
7 June 2005 Semi-final	Sydney FC (Australia)	6–0	(Vanuatu) Tafea	Stade Pater, Tahiti
	Petrovski 26'; Zdrilic 39'; Talay 44' (pen.); Corica 65', 90'; Salazar 87'	report		Attendance: 4,000

10 June 2005 Final	Sydney FC (Australia)	2–0	(New Caledonia) AS Magenta	Stade Pater, Tahiti
	Bingley 16'; Zdrilic 59'	report		Attendance: 4,000

=== 2005 Pre-season Challenge Cup ===
Pos	Team	Pld	W	D	L	GF	GA	GD	Pts	Qualification or relegation
1	Sydney FC	3	2	1	0	5	1	+4	7	Advance to semi-finals
2	Central Coast Mariners	3	2	0	1	4	3	+1	6	Advance to semi-finals
3	Queensland Roar	3	1	1	1	6	3	+3	4	
4	New Zealand Knights	3	0	0	3	1	9	−8	0	

==== Knockout stage ====
Semi-finals
12 August
Melbourne Victory	1
Central Coast Mariners	3
14 August
Sydney FC	0
Perth Glory	1

Final
21 August
Central Coast Mariners	1
Perth Glory	0

=== 2005–06 A-League ===
==== League table ====
Pos	Team	Pld	W	D	L	GF	GA	GD	Pts	Qualification
1	Adelaide United	21	13	4	4	33	25	+8	43	Qualification for 2007 AFC Champions League group stage and Finals series
2	Sydney FC (C)	21	10	6	5	35	28	+7	36	Qualification for 2007 AFC Champions League group stage and Finals series
3	Central Coast Mariners	21	8	8	5	35	28	+7	32	Qualification for Finals series
4	Newcastle Jets	21	9	4	8	27	29	−2	31	Qualification for Finals series
5	Perth Glory	21	8	5	8	34	29	+5	29	
6	Queensland Roar	21	7	7	7	27	22	+5	28	
7	Melbourne Victory	21	7	5	9	26	24	+2	26	
8	New Zealand Knights (Note: New Zealand Knights cannot qualify for the AFC Champions League as they are not recognised as an AFC club.)	21	1	3	17	15	47	−32	6	

Source: ultimatealeague.com
Rules for classification: 1) points; 2) goal difference; 3) number of goals scored.
(C) Champions

==== Matches ====
28 August 2005 1	Sydney FC	1–1	Melbourne Victory	Aussie Stadium, Sydney
17:00 UTC+10	Yorke 44'	Report; Summary	Thompson 73'	Attendance: 25,208; Referee: (Australia) Mark Shield

2 September 2005 2	New Zealand Knights	1–3	Sydney FC	North Harbour Stadium, Auckland
20:00 UTC+12	Rose 69'	Report; Summary	Rudan 25'; Bingley 73'; Middleby 90+4'	Attendance: 9,827; Referee: (New Zealand) Peter O'Leary

11 September 2005 3	Newcastle Jets	2–1	Sydney FC	EnergyAustralia Stadium, Newcastle
17:00 UTC+10	Milicic 6'; Johnson 18'; Corbo (yellow card) 39' (yellow-red card) 70'	Report; Summary	Yorke 78'; Corica (red card) 70'	Attendance: 9,127; Referee: (Australia) Matthew Breeze

16 September 2005 4	Sydney FC	2–3	Central Coast Mariners	Aussie Stadium, Sydney
20:00 UTC+10	Packer 13'; Yorke 72'	Report; Summary	Petrie 20' (pen.); Gumprecht 35'; Spencer 90+1'	Attendance: 15,614; Referee: (New Zealand) Peter O'Leary

23 September 2005 5	Queensland Roar	1–3	Sydney FC	Suncorp Stadium, Brisbane
20:00 UTC+10	Timpano 50' (o.g.)	Report; Summary	Corica 5', 67'; McFlynn 68'	Attendance: 23,142; Referee: (Australia) Matthew Breeze

1 October 2005 6	Perth Glory	1–2	Sydney FC	Members Equity Stadium, Perth
19:35 UTC+8	Despotovski 40'	Report; Summary	Petrovski 48'; Yorke 65'	Attendance: 13,157; Referee: (Australia) Matthew Breeze

9 October 2005 7	Sydney FC	2–1	Adelaide United	Aussie Stadium, Sydney
17:00 UTC+10	Carney 54'; Petrovski 88'	Report; Summary	Valkanis 51'	Attendance: 18,276; Referee: (Australia) Mark Shield

16 October 2005 8	Melbourne Victory	5–0	Sydney FC	Olympic Park Stadium, Melbourne
13:00 UTC+10	Kitzbichler 34'; Muscat 53' (pen.), 78' (pen.); Thompson 57', 69'	Report; Summary	Talay (red card) 58'	Attendance: 18,206; Referee: (Australia) Matthew Breeze

21 October 2005 9	Sydney FC	2–0	New Zealand Knights	Aussie Stadium, Sydney
20:00 UTC+10	Petrovski 10'; Carney 30'	Report; Summary		Attendance: 11,836; Referee: (Australia) Ben Williams

30 October 2005 10	Sydney FC	1–1	Newcastle Jets	Aussie Stadium, Sydney
17:00 UTC+10	Carney 73'	Report; Summary	Milicic 77'	Attendance: 9,132; Referee: (Australia) Mark Shield

5 November 2005 11	Central Coast Mariners	1–5	Sydney FC	Bluetongue Stadium, Gosford
20:00 UTC+11	Hutchinson 40'	Report; Summary	Yorke 9' (pen.); Talay 14'; Petrovski 23', 68', 83'	Attendance: 10,529; Referee: (Australia) Simon Przydacz

13 November 2005 12	Sydney FC	1–0	Queensland Roar	Aussie Stadium, Sydney
	Zdrillic 54'			Attendance: 13,030; Referee: (Australia) Ben Williams

19 November 2005 13	Sydney FC	0–0	Perth Glory	Aussie Stadium, Sydney
				Attendance: 16,242; Referee: (Australia) Matthew Breeze

27 November 2005 14	Adelaide United	3–2	Sydney FC	Hindmarsh Stadium, Adelaide
	Rech 4', 84'; Veart 14'		Miura 33', 76'	Attendance: 14,068; Referee: (Australia) Mark Shield

3 December 2005 15	Sydney FC	2–1	Melbourne Victory	Aussie Stadium, Sydney
	Carney 81'; Corica 24'		Allsopp 88'	Attendance: 17,272; Referee: (Australia) Matthew Breeze

30 December 2005 16	New Zealand Knights	2–2	Sydney FC	North Harbour Stadium, Auckland
	Brockie 86'; Devine 3'		Yorke 45' (pen.); Veart 6'	Attendance: 4,212; Referee: (Australia) Peter Green

6 January 2006 17	Sydney FC	0–0	Newcastle Jets	Aussie Stadium, Sydney
				Attendance: 15,211; Referee: (Australia) Matthew Breeze

14 January 2006 18	Sydney FC	1–1	Central Coast Mariners	Aussie Stadium, Sydney
	Carney 61'		Pondeljak 52'	Attendance: 15,977; Referee: (Australia) Ben Williams

21 January 2006 19	Queensland Roar	2–1	Sydney FC	Suncorp Stadium, Brisbane
	Brosque 60', 70'		Petrovski 85'	Attendance: 13,302; Referee: (Australia) Simon Przydacz

29 January 2006 20	Perth Glory	1–2	Sydney FC	Members Equity Stadium, Perth
	Despotovski 53'		Zadkovich 23'; Rudan 14'	Attendance: 12,796; Referee: (Australia) Craig Zetter

3 February 2006 21	Sydney FC	2–1	Adelaide United	Aussie Stadium, Sydney
	Ceccoli 71'; Yorke 48' (pen.)		Qu 90'	Attendance: 25,557; Referee: (Australia) Mark Shield

==== Finals series ====
12 February 2006 Semi-finals First leg	Adelaide United	2–2	Sydney FC	Hindmarsh Stadium, Adelaide
	Rech 34'; Dodd 31'		Petrovski 39'; Corica 9'	Attendance: 15,104; Referee: (Australia) Matthew Breeze

19 February 2006 Semi-finals Second leg	Sydney FC	2–1	Adelaide United	Aussie Stadium, Sydney
	Rudan 76'; Petrovski 29'		Qu 60'	Attendance: 30,377; Referee: (Australia) Mark Shield

5 March 2006 Grand Final	Sydney FC	1–0	Central Coast Mariners	Aussie Stadium, Sydney
	Corica 62'			Attendance: 41,689; Referee: (Australia) Mark Shield

=== FIFA World Club Championship ===
12 December 2005 Quarter-finals	Sydney FC (Australia)	0–1	(Costa Rica) Deportivo Saprissa	Toyota, Japan
21:20 AEDT (UTC+11)	Ceccoli (red card) 81'	Report	Bolaños 47'	Stadium: Toyota Stadium; Attendance: 28,538; Referee: Toru Kamikawa (Japan)

16 December 2005 Match for fifth place	Al Ahly (Egypt)	1–2	(Australia) Sydney FC	Tokyo, Japan
21:20 AEDT (UTC+11)	Moteab 45'	Report	Yorke 35'; Carney 66'	Stadium: National Stadium; Attendance: 15,951; Referee: Toru Kamikawa (Japan)

== Appearances and goals ==
Players with no appearances not included in the list.

No.	Pos.	Nat.	Name	A-League		CWC Qualifying		Pre-Season Cup		OFC Club Championship		Club World Championship		Total	
No.	Pos.	Nat.	Name	Apps	Goals	Apps	Goals	Apps	Goals	Apps	Goals	Apps	Goals	Apps	Goals
1	GK	(Australia)	Clint Bolton	24	0	3	0	4	0	5	0	2	0	38	0
2	DF	(Australia)	Iain Fyfe	20+3	0	3	0	4	0	5	1	2	0	34+3	1
3	DF	(Australia)	Alvin Ceccoli	24	1	3	0	4	0	5	1	1	0	37	2
4	DF	(Australia)	Marko Rudan	10+6	3	0+1	0	0+1	0	1	0	1+1	0	24	3
6	MF	(Australia)	Ufuk Talay	15+1	1	3	1	2+1	0	4	1	1	0	27	3
7	MF	(Australia)	Robbie Middleby	2+14	1	0+3	0	3+1	0	4	0	0	0	27	1
8	MF	(Australia)	Matthew Bingley	13+7	1	3	0	0	0	5	1	1	0	29	2
9	FW	(Australia)	David Zdrilic	9+10	1	3	0	0+1	0	5	9	0+2	0	30	10
10	MF	(Australia)	Steve Corica	21+1	5	0+3	0	4	1	2+3	3	2	0	36	9
11	FW	(Australia)	Sasho Petrovski	20+2	9	3	2	3	3	4	4	2	0	34	18
12	MF	(Australia)	David Carney	22+2	6	3	2	4	0	5	1	2	1	38	6
14	MF	(Australia)	Andrew Packer	13+7	1	3	1	4	0	5	1	1+1	0	34	3
15	MF	(Northern Ireland)	Terry McFlynn	16+5	1	3	0	4	0	4	0	1+1	0	34	1
16	DF	(Australia)	Mark Milligan	10	0	3	0	0	0	0	0	2	0	15	0
17	DF	(Australia)	Jacob Timpano	18+3	0	0+1	0	4	0	0	0	0	0	26	0
18	DF	(Australia)	Wade Oostendorp	0	0	0	0	0	0	0+1	0	0	0	1	0
19	FW	(Trinidad and Tobago)	Dwight Yorke	19+2	7	0	0	3	1	0	0	2	1	31	9
23	MF	(Australia)	Ruben Zadkovich	4+2	1	0	0	0	0	0	0	0	0	6	1

== End-of-season awards ==
Award	Winner
Player of the Year	(Australia) Clint Bolton
Member's Player of the Year	(Australia) David Carney
Golden Boot	(Australia) Sasho Petrovski
Defender of the Year	(Australia) Alvin Ceccoli
Midfielder of the Year	(Australia) David Carney
Forward of the Year	(Trinidad and Tobago) Dwight Yorke
Chairman's Award	(Australia) Mark Rudan
Finals Player of the Year	(Australia) Steve Corica
Goal of the Year	(Australia) Alvin Ceccoli
