= Sydney FC in international football =

Sydney FC in an Australian soccer club that has participated in many international tournaments and friendlies from 2005 to the present season. Indeed, its first competitive fixture was to qualify for the Oceania Champions League. Despite their short history, Sydney FC have participated in five different international competitions, the most by any A-League club. They have competed at the Asian Champions League five times, the AFC Champions League Two once, and at the Oceania Club Championship (before the Football Federation Australia were admitted into the Asian Football Confederation). Sydney FC alongside Adelaide United and Western Sydney Wanderers are the only teams to have represented the A-League in the FIFA Club World Cup. Sydney FC are the only team to have represented the A-League in the Pan-Pacific Championship during the 2008 competition.

== History ==
=== Oceania and Club World Cup (2005) ===
Sydney FC participated in the 2005 OFC Club Championship after defeating Queensland Roar, Perth Glory, and Central Coast Mariners in a qualifying tournament. The Championship was held in Papeete, Tahiti. Sydney's first match was against New Zealand team Auckland City FC, Sydney won 2–1. Sydney would go on to defeat AS Pirae and Sobou FC in the group stages to book a place in the semi-final against Tafea FC. Sydney dispatched the side from Vanuatu 6–0 with Steve Corica scoring twice as a substitute. In the final against AS Magenta, Sydney won 2–0 with goals coming from Matthew Bingley and David Zdrillic.

In December 2005, Sydney FC competed in the 2005 FIFA Club World Championship as the Oceania Football Confederation's entry to the tournament following their 2004–05 Oceania Club Championships success in June. On 12 December, in front of a crowd of over 28,000 at Japan's Toyota Stadium, Sydney FC narrowly lost to Costa Rican champions Deportivo Saprissa 1–0, denying the club a semi–final match against European champion Liverpool F.C. Four days later, Sydney FC defeated the African "Club of the Century" Al Ahly 2–1 to finish the competition in fifth place. This was to be any Australian football club's last year to qualify for the Club World Championship through the Oceania Club Championship. The FFA announced soon after Sydneys grand final win that Australia will depart from the Oceania Football Confederation to join the higher ranking Asian Football Confederation. The A-league now participates AFC's inter-city club tournaments such as the Asian Champions League held annually during the off-season of the A-league, and also the international cup tournaments such as the Asian Cup held every 4 years. Sydney FC went on to represent Australia in the Asian Champions league in 2007.

==== Match details ====
2005 OFC Club Championship

31 May 2005 Group Stage	Sydney FC (Australia)	3–2	(New Zealand) Auckland City	Stade Pater, Tahiti
	Ceccoli 32'; Packer 47'; Corica 90+3'	report	Seaman 37'; Smith 78'	Attendance: 4,000

2 June 2005 Group Stage	Sobou FC (Papua New Guinea)	2–9	(Australia) Sydney FC	Stade Pater, Tahiti
	Wate 57'; Daniel 90'	report	Fyfe 5'; Petrovski 14', 43', 71'; Zdrilic 19', 40', 42'; Brodie 79'; Salazar 82'	Attendance: 3,000

4 June 2005 Group Stage	Sydney FC (Australia)	6–0	(French Polynesia) AS Pirae	Stade Pater, Tahiti
	Zdrilic 11', 25', 35', 39'; Buonavoglia 43'; Carney 85'	report		Attendance: 1,500

7 June 2005 Semi-final	Sydney FC (Australia)	6–0	(Vanuatu) Tafea	Stade Pater, Tahiti
	Petrovski 26'; Zdrilic 39'; Talay 44' (pen.); Corica 65', 90'; Salazar 87'	report		Attendance: 4,000

10 June 2005 Final	Sydney FC (Australia)	2–0	(New Caledonia) AS Magenta	Stade Pater, Tahiti
	Bingley 16'; Zdrilic 59'	report		Attendance: 4,000

2005 Club World Cup

12 December 2005 Quarter-final	Sydney FC (Australia)	0–1	(Costa Rica) Deportivo Saprissa	Toyota Stadium, Nagoya
				Attendance: 28,538

16 December 2005 Fifth Place Play-Off	Al Ahly (Egypt)	1–2	(Australia) Sydney FC	Olympic Stadium, Tokyo
				Attendance: 15,951

=== Move to Asia (2007–2011) ===
On 22 November 2006, Sydney FC and Adelaide United, as 2005–06 Champions and Premiers, were nominated as the first clubs to represent the Australia in the AFC Champions League 2007 to coincide with the FFA's inclusion into the AFC. Expectations were low for Sydney after a troubled season – many key players left the club at season's end and coach Terry Butcher was replaced by former NSL coach Branko Culina. Culina named a revamped 21-man squad and in their opening game on 7 March 2007 had 2–1 away win over Shanghai Shenhua with Ufuk Talay scoring a thunderous goal outside of the 18-yard box. That result was followed up with a 2–2 draw at home against Japanese club Urawa Red Diamonds after being up 2–0 in front of 21,010 – a larger home crowd than any of the previous season's regular matches. In a game delayed by a day after near monsoonal rain, they struggled away against Indonesian side Persik Kediri, losing 2–1 and showing their lack of match fitness against a better than expected Persik side.

In the return match a fortnight later, Sydney FC revenged the loss at Parramatta Stadium in western Sydney, defeating Persik 3–0 with goals from Steve Corica and Alex Brosque. Sydney's final matches in the group finished in stalemates, first at home to Shanghai and then in Japan at Urawa Reds. Sydney was one point behind Urawa in their group ladder going into the final match, faced with needing to win in order to progress. Unable to capitalise on good ball possession, the match ended 0–0 and thus ended Sydney's Asian Champions League campaign as only the first-placed team progressed to the knockout phase of the competition.

The following season, Sydney FC was selected to represent Australia and the AFC in the Pan-Pacific Championship after being the highest placed A-League club in the 2007–08 A-League season not competing in the conclusion of that competition's finals series. On 20 February, Sydney were pitted against Houston Dynamo, who had won the previous season's MLS Championship. The match was played on artificial turf at Aloha Stadium. Sydney were never really settled in the unfamiliar conditions, and suffered a 3–0 loss. Sydney newcomer Ryan Walsh was dispossessed of the ball 8 metres from the 18-yard box by Brian Ching, and the Canadian International Dwayne De Rosario put the ball past keeper Clint Bolton. Then, straight after the restart by Sydney, Stuart Holden received a 'through-ball' pass from Dwayne De Rosario, and shot past a stunned Sydney defence from the edge of the 6-yard box. When Chris Wondolowski scored before half-time to make the score 3–0, Sydney FC had really lost hope of coming back.

An under-strength Sydney went into the 3/4 playoff against Los Angeles Galaxy fairly confident, as they had already beaten them during the November 2007 friendly match. However, Sydney fell behind only 3 minutes into the match when multimillion-dollar English signing David Beckham sent in a pin-point cross from the right wing to find striker Ely Allen, who volleyed the ball past Sydney keeper Ivan Necevski. Defender Brendan Renaud then scored with a powerful shot from 30 metres out in the top right corner, but the Los Angeles team regained the lead soon after, as David Beckham again sent in a cross that Necevski couldn't handle and palmed to the feet of Los Angeles midfielder Josh Tudela, who tapped the ball into the net. LA went on to win the match 2–1, and Sydney finished 4th in the inaugural tournament. Japanese side Gamba Osaka finished 1st, after a 6–1 thrashing of MLS Champions Houston Dynamo.

Despite a poor 2010–11 season and following several key players being released to other clubs, Sydney were expected to do well during the 2011 Asian Champions League campaign. Unfortunately, Sydney struggled against the superior East-Asian teams, however managed to gain 2 points from their opening 2 rounds against Kashima Antlers and Shanghai Shenhua.

The home leg against Shanghai was a frustrating match where Sydney missed several easy chances and being forced to settle for a 1–1 draw. In Sydney's final home match against Korean team Suwon Samsung Bluewings, Sydney were belted 3–0 by a dominant Bluewings outfit. However, the team regained some faith with a twice come-from-behind win against Shanghai Shenhua in Shanghai, China winning 3–2 with Brazilian striker Bruno Cazarine helping with a brace.

Sydney would go on to finish 3rd in the group stage after losing away to Kashima 2–1 in Tokyo. Sydney were unable to qualify for the Round of 16, winning 1 game, drawing 2 and losing 3.

==== Match details ====
2007 AFC Champions League

Group Stage

7 March 2007	Shanghai Shenhua	1–2	Sydney FC	Yuanshen Stadium, Shanghai, China
	Xie Hui 78'	(Report)	Steve Corica 8'; Ufuk Talay 23'	Attendance: 12,000; Referee: (South Korea) Lee Gi-Young

21 March 2007	Sydney FC	2–2	Urawa Red Diamonds	Sydney Football Stadium, Sydney, Australia
	David Carney 1'; Ufuk Talay 23' (pen)	(Report)	Robson Ponte 30'; Yuichiro Nagai 55'	Attendance: 21,010; Referee: (Malaysia) Subkhiddin Mohd Salleh

12 April 2007	Persik Kediri	2–1	Sydney FC	Manahan Stadium, Surakarta, Indonesia
	Aris Budi Prasetyo 25'; Budi Sudarsono 70'	(Report)	Steve Corica 8'	Attendance: 15,000; Referee: (Qatar) Abdullah Balideh

25 April 2007	Sydney FC	3–0	Persik Kediri	Parramatta Stadium, Sydney, Australia
	Steve Corica 54', 90'; Alex Brosque 73'	(Report)		Attendance: 10,075; Referee: (Vietnam) Minh Tri Vo

9 May 2007	Sydney FC	0–0	Shanghai Shenhua	Sydney Football Stadium, Sydney, Australia
		(Report 1 2)		Attendance: 14,786; Referee: (Singapore) Abdul Bashir

23 May 2007	Urawa Red Diamonds	0–0	Sydney FC	Saitama Stadium, Saitama, Japan
		(Report)		Attendance: 44,793; Referee: (United Arab Emirates) Fareed Al-Marzouqi

2008 Pan-Pacific Championship

20 February 2008 Semi-final	Houston Dynamo	3–0	Sydney FC	Aloha Stadium, Honolulu, USA
	Dwayne De Rosario 28'; Stuart Holden 29'; Chris Wondolowski 43'	Report	Brendon Santalab (yellow card) 49'; Ryan Walsh (yellow card) 57'	Attendance: 15,128; Referee: Alex Prus

23 February 2008 Third Place Final	Los Angeles Galaxy	2–1	Sydney FC	Aloha Stadium, Honolulu, USA
	Ely Allen 3'; Josh Tudela 45'; Michael Gavin (yellow card) 72'	Report	Brendan Renaud 43'; Terry McFlynn (yellow card) 49'; Mark Robertson (yellow card) 51'	Attendance: 23,087; Referee: Brian Hall

2011 AFC Champions League

Group Stage

2 March 2011	Sydney FC (Australia)	0–0	(South Korea) Suwon Samsung Bluewings	Sydney Football Stadium
20:00 UTC+10	McFlynn (red card) 32'	Report		Attendance: 7095; Referee: Abdul Mailk Abdul Bashir (Singapore)

6 April 2011	Sydney FC (Australia)	1–1	(China) Shanghai Shenhua	Sydney Football Stadium
20:00 UTC+10	Carle 13'	Report	Riascos 6'	Attendance: 7,007; Referee: Abdullah Balideh (Qatar)

13 April 2011^{1}	Sydney FC (Australia)	0–3	(Japan) Kashima Antlers	Sydney Football Stadium
20:00 UTC+10		Report	Nozawa 41'; Gabriel 61'; Koroki 90+3'	Attendance: 7,320; Referee: Ali Hamad Madhad Saif Albawawi (United Arab Emirates)

19 April 2011	Shanghai Shenhua (China)	2–3	(Australia) Sydney FC	Hongkou Stadium
20:00 UTC+8	Jiajun 8'	Report	Cazarine 45+1', 59'; Bridge 90+1'	Attendance: 10,215; Referee: Subkhiddin Mohd Salleh (Malaysia)

3 May 2011	Suwon Samsung Bluewings (South Korea)	3–1	(Australia) Sydney FC	Suwon World Cup Stadium
19:30 UTC+9	Ha Tae-Gyun 34'; Neretljak 50'; Yeom Ki-Hoon 80'	Report	Cazarine 51'	Attendance: 9,495; Referee: Ravshan Irmatov (Uzbekistan)

10 May 2011^{1}	Kashima Antlers (Japan)	2–1	(Australia) Sydney FC	National Olympic Stadium^{2}
15:00 UTC+9	Osako 64'; Nozawa 84'	Report	Jurman 26'	Attendance: 3,164; Referee: Khalil Al Ghamdi (Saudi Arabia)

Notes

- Note 2: The Kashima Antlers v Sydney FC match was postponed from 16 March 2011 to 10 May 2011 due to the 2011 Tōhoku earthquake and tsunami in Japan. The return match, Sydney FC v Kashima Antlers, was brought forward from 10 May 2011 to 13 April 2011. All home matches of the Kashima Antlers were moved to the National Olympic Stadium in Tokyo as the Kashima Soccer Stadium in Kashima was damaged in the earthquake.

=== Return to Asia (2016–present) ===
After many lean seasons domestically, Sydney qualified to compete in the AFC Champions League for the first time after a four-year hiatus when they came second in the 2014–15 A-League season. Despite a poor 2015–16 season and following several key players being released to other clubs, Sydney were expected to do well during the 2016 Asian Champions League. They were placed in group of "death" stage. However, one of the surprising results was that they were able to defeat defending champions Guangzhou Evergrande 2–1 in a home leg at Allianz Stadium. Sydney would go on to finish 1st out of 4 teams：winning 3 games, drawing 1 and losing 2. This meant Sydney progressed to the knockout stages for the first time in the Champions League.

After a strong result away in the first leg, drawing 1–1 with Chinese side Shandong Luneng it seemed that Sydney might progress to the quarter-finals. Leading 2–1 at home in the second leg, Hao Junmin scored a 90th-minute equaliser to draw Shandong level 3–3 on aggregate. This effectively finished the Sky Blues continental hopes as Shandong progressed to the next stage on away goals.

Despite a strong 2017–18 season, Sydney were expected to do well during the 2018 Asian Champions League. Ironically, they were placed in the same group as they did in 2011 campaign. Despite Sydney FC beating Suwon Bluewings away from home and having not scoring a goal at home, they finished their disappointing 2018 campaign in 3rd place, unable to progress to the knockout stage for the second time.

Sydney qualified for the AFC Champions League for a second consecutive year and the third time in four years when they competed in the 2019 AFC Champions League. However, they were pitted against very strong opposition in 2018 Chinese Super League champions Shanghai SIPG, 2018 J1 League Champions Kawasaki Frontale and Korean qualifiers Ulsan Hyundai. It was the first time that Sydney had met any of these teams in the Champions League. Shanghai SIPG were considered particularly strong, boasting world-class players like Oscar, Hulk, Elkeson and Odil Akhmedov for the tournament.

In Sydney's first match, they were scheduled to host Ulsan at Jubilee Stadium. In a very windy match, Sydney asserted early dominance with striker Adam Le Fondre creating three good chances in the opening 12 minutes. As the wind continued to pick-up in the second half Sydney continued to control ball possession but could not find the goal to break the stalemate despite repeated incursions into the Korean final third. The score ended 0–0.

Sydney traveled to Japan for their second game against Kawasaki. The hosts had the better of possession and opportunities in both halves, however Sydney defended well for large periods of the game. Sydney's goalkeeper Andrew Redmayne made some fine saves to keep his team in the contest. It took until the 83-minute for Manabu Saito to give Kawasaki the lead in front of an 11,000 strong crowd. The match ended 1–0, handing Sydney FC their first defeat for the campaign as Kawasaki picked up their first points for the tournament.

Sydney returned home for their third game of the campaign among a busy schedule for the side in their domestic league, playing the match in between a Big Blue and a Sydney derby against their two fiercest rivals. The Big Blue in particular had significant importance as the winner would most likely finish in the all-important second place for the end of season standings. Despite this, Sydney largely put out a full-strength team as Johnny Warren Medalist Milos Ninkovic the main notable exception in the starting squad. Billed as a David and Goliath battle against Shanghai SIPG, the Sydney community were encouraged to attend the game to watch the likes of Oscar, Hulk and Elkeson in their own city. To the surprise of many, Sydney took an early lead with loan marquee Siem de Jong scoring in the third minute. A cushioned header from Lu Wenjun for Shanghai drew the scores level before Le Fondre took back the lead for Sydney, converting a penalty for a hand-ball in the box by a Shanghai defender. Yu Hai once again brought the scores level nodding home a cross from Hulk. Sydney continued to search for a go-ahead goal throughout much of the second half controlling much of the possession in Shanghai's half. Alex Brosque finally broke the deadlock in the 84th minute, one minute after being substituted into the game. Shanghai once again denied Sydney from taking the three points when Elkeson blasted home the equaliser in the 89th minute capitalising on a swift counter-attack after Josh Brillante lost possession for Sydney in midfield. The cruel end to the game left Sydney in last place of the group standings at the mid-way point of the group stage on 2 points, having already played two of three home games. Sydney failed to win in any of their three remaining games only picking up 1 point, leaving them at the bottom of the group standings.

==== Match details ====
2016 AFC Champions League

Group Stage

24 February 2016 1	Urawa Red Diamonds (Japan)	2–0	(Australia) Sydney FC	Saitama, Japan
19:30 JST	Muto 8'; Koroki 65' (pen.)	Report		Stadium: Saitama Stadium; Attendance: 19,500; Referee: Ali Sabah (Iraq)

2 March 2016 2	Sydney FC (Australia)	2–1	(China) Guangzhou Evergrande Taobao	Sydney, Australia
20:00 AEDT	Stambolziev 18'; Dimitrijević 89'	Report	Calver 25' (o.g.)	Stadium: Sydney Football Stadium; Attendance: 18,149; Referee: Alireza Faghani (Iran)

16 March 2016 3	Pohang Steelers (South Korea)	0–1	(Australia) Sydney FC	Pohang, South Korea
19:30 KST		Report	Naumoff 41'	Stadium: Pohang Steel Yard; Attendance: 4,247; Referee: Fahad Al-Mirdasi (Saudi Arabia)

5 April 2016 4	Sydney FC (Australia)	1–0	(South Korea) Pohang Steelers	Sydney, Australia
20:00 AEST	Ninković 51'	Report		Stadium: Sydney Football Stadium; Attendance: 5,642; Referee: Mohsen Torky (Iran)

20 April 2016 5	Sydney FC (Australia)	0–0	(Japan) Urawa Red Diamonds	Sydney, Australia
20:00 AEST		Report		Stadium: Sydney Football Stadium; Attendance: 8,803; Referee: Muhammad Taqi (Singapore)

3 May 2016 6	Guangzhou Evergrande Taobao (China)	1–0	(Australia) Sydney FC	Guangzhou, China
18:30 CST	Gao Lin 2'	Report		Stadium: Tianhe Stadium; Attendance: 33,517; Referee: Nawaf Shukralla (Bahrain)

Round of 16

18 May 2016 First leg	Shandong Luneng Taishan (China)	1–1	Sydney FC (Australia)	Jinan, China
19:30 CST	Tardelli 57'	Report	Carney 15'	Stadium: Jinan Olympic Sports Center Stadium; Attendance: 16,917; Referee: Abdulrahman Al-Jassim (Qatar)

25 May 2016 Second leg	Sydney FC (Australia)	2–2 (3–3 agg.)	Shandong Luneng Taishan (China)	Sydney, Australia
20:00 AEST	O'Neill 2'; Grant 46'; Anderson (red card) 76'	Report	Montillo 12'; Hao 90'	Stadium: Sydney Football Stadium; Attendance: 9,451; Referee: Ilgiz Tantashev (Uzbekistan)

2018 AFC Champions League

Group Stage

14 February 2018 1	Sydney FC (Australia)	0–2	(South Korea) Suwon Samsung Bluewings	Sydney, Australia
19:30 AEDT		Report	Dejan 62', 76' (pen.)	Stadium: Sydney Football Stadium; Attendance: 6,349; Referee: Mohammed Abdulla (United Arab Emirates)

21 February 2018 2	Shanghai Shenhua (China)	2–2	(Australia) Sydney FC	Shanghai, China
20:00 CST	Martins 26'; Guarín 39'	Report	Wilkshire 28'; Brosque 34'	Stadium: Hongkou Football Stadium; Attendance: 22,918; Referee: Valentin Kovalenko (Uzbekistan)

7 March 2018 3	Sydney FC (Australia)	0–2	(Japan) Kashima Antlers	Sydney, Australia
19:30 AEDT		Report	Doi 40'; Ueda 87'	Stadium: Sydney Football Stadium; Attendance: 6,442; Referee: Ahmed Al-Kaf (Oman)

13 March 2018 4	Kashima Antlers (Japan)	1–1	(Australia) Sydney FC	Kashima, Japan
19:00 JST	Kanazaki 25'	Report	Simon 70'	Stadium: Kashima Soccer Stadium; Attendance: 8,593; Referee: Khamis Al-Marri (Qatar)

3 April 2018 5	Suwon Samsung Bluewings (South Korea)	1–4	(Australia) Sydney FC	Suwon, South Korea
19:30 KST	Dejan 24'	Report	Ninković 23'; Brosque 31'; Mierzejewski 79'; Bobô 90+1'	Stadium: Suwon World Cup Stadium; Attendance: 3,756; Referee: Fahad Al-Mirdasi (Saudi Arabia)

17 April 2018 6	Sydney FC (Australia)	0–0	(China) Shanghai Shenhua	Sydney, Australia
20:00 AEST		Report		Stadium: Sydney Football Stadium; Attendance: 9,855; Referee: Mohanad Qassim (Iraq)

2019 AFC Champions League

Group Stage

6 March 2019 1	Sydney FC (Australia)	0–0	(South Korea) Ulsan Hyundai	Sydney, Australia
20:00 AEDT		Report		Stadium: Jubilee Oval; Attendance: 4,039; Referee: Khamis Al-Kuwari (Qatar)

13 March 2019 2	Kawasaki Frontale (Japan)	1–0	(Australia) Sydney FC	Kawasaki, Japan
19:00 JST	Saitō 83'	Report		Stadium: Todoroki Athletics Stadium; Attendance: 11,278; Referee: Valentin Kovalenko (Uzbekistan)

10 April 2019 3	Sydney FC (Australia)	3–3	(China) Shanghai SIPG	Sydney, Australia
19:30 AEST	de Jong 3'; Le Fondre 32' (pen.); Brosque 84'	Report	Lü 27'; Yu Hai 36'; Elkeson 89'	Stadium: Jubilee Oval; Attendance: 7,154; Referee: Alireza Faghani (Iran)

23 April 2019 4	Shanghai SIPG (China)	2–2	(Australia) Sydney FC	Shanghai, China
19:30 CST	Elkeson 47'; Wang 59'	Report	O'Neill 33'; Le Fondre 62'	Stadium: Shanghai Stadium; Attendance: 21,989; Referee: Abdulrahman Al-Jassim (Qatar)

7 May 2019 5	Ulsan Hyundai (South Korea)	1–0	(Australia) Sydney FC	Ulsan, South Korea
19:00 KST	Diskerud 59'	Report		Stadium: Ulsan Munsu Football Stadium; Attendance: 1,520; Referee: Ali Sabah (Iraq)

21 May 2019 6	Sydney FC (Australia)	0–4	(Japan) Kawasaki Frontale	Sydney, Australia
20:00 AEST		Report	Wakizaka 9', 20'; Tanaka 28'; Leandro Damião 59'	Stadium: Jubilee Oval; Attendance: 3,813; Referee: Mohanad Qasim Sarray (Iraq)

2020 AFC Champions League

Group Stage

19 February 2020 1	Yokohama F. Marinos (Japan)	4–0	(Australia) Sydney FC	Nissan Stadium, Yokohama
19:30 UTC+9	Onaiwu 12', 51'; Nakagawa 31', 33'	Live Report; Stats Report		Attendance: 11,863; Referee: Mooud Bonyadifar (Iran)

4 March 2020 2	Sydney FC (Australia)	2–2	(South Korea) Jeonbuk Hyundai Motors	Jubilee Oval, Sydney
19:30 UTC+11	Buhagiar 56'; Le Fondre 77' (pen.)	Live Report; Stats Report	Brattan 50' (o.g.); Han Kyo-won 89'	Attendance: 3,255; Referee: Ahmed Al-Kaf (Oman)

19 November 2020 3	Sydney FC (Australia)	1–2	(China) Shanghai SIPG	Khalifa International Stadium, Doha
13:00 UTC+3	Buhagiar 8'	Live Report; Stats Report	Li Shenglong 63', 79'	Attendance: 0 Referee: Abdulrahman Al-Jassim (Qatar)

25 November 2020 4	Jeonbuk Hyundai Motors (South Korea)	1–0	(Australia) Sydney FC	Al Janoub Stadium, Al Wakrah
13:00 UTC+3	Na Seong-eun 44'	Live Report; Stats Report		Attendance: 0 Referee: Hettikamkanamge Perera (Sri Lanka)

1 December 2020 5	Shanghai SIPG (China)	0–4	(Australia) Sydney FC	Al Janoub Stadium, Al Wakrah
16:00 UTC+3		Live Report; Stats Report	Wilkinson 28'; Brattan 33'; Buhagiar 57', 60'	Attendance: 0 Referee: Turki Al-Khudhayr (Saudi Arabia)

4 December 2020 6	Sydney FC (Australia)	1–1	(Japan) Yokohama F. Marinos	Al Janoub Stadium, Al Wakrah
13:00 UTC+3	Buhagiar 29'	Live Report; Stats Report	Saneto 18'	Attendance: 0 Referee: Saoud Al-Athbah (Qatar)

== Records ==
As of 9 April 2025

- Most appearances in Asia: 35, Rhyan Grant
- Most goals in Asia: 6
  - Trent Buhagiar
  - Patryk Klimala
- Most goals in Asian campaign: 6
  - Patryk Klimala in the 2024–25 AFC Champions League Two
- First match in Asia: 2007 AFC Champions League group stage match – Shanghai Shenhua 1–2 Sydney FC on 7 March 2007.
- First goal scored in Asia: Steve Corica, against Shanghai Shenhua on 7 March 2007.
- Biggest win (in Asian competition): 5 goals
  - 5–0 against Kaya F.C.–Iloilo on 8 May 2022 at Jubilee Oval,
  - 5–0 against Eastern on 19 September 2024 at Jubilee Oval.
- Biggest win (in AFC Champions League): 4 goals, 4–0 against Shanghai SIPG on 1 December 2020 at Al Janoub Stadium.
- Biggest defeat: 4 goals
  - 0–4 against Kawasaki Frontale on 21 May 2019 at Jubilee Oval
  - 0–4 against Yokohama F. Marinos on 19 February 2020 at Nissan Stadium.
- Highest home attendance: 21,010 against Urawa Red Diamonds on 21 March 2007 (in the 2007 AFC Champions League).
- Lowest home attendance (in Asian competition): 435 against Kaya F.C.–Iloilo on 8 May 2022 (in the 2022 AFC Champions League qualification)
- Lowest home attendance (in AFC Champions League): 3,255 against Jeonbuk Hyundai Motors FC on 4 March 2020 (in the 2020 AFC Champions League).

=== By season ===
As of 16 April 2025

Key
Runners-Up in Final
Winners in Final

Season	Competition	Pld	W	D	L	F	A	GD	Win %	Rank
2005	OFC Club Championship	5	5	0	0	26	4	+22	100.00	**Winners**
2005	FIFA Club World Championship	2	1	0	1	2	2	+0	50.00	Fifth Place
2007	AFC Champions League	6	2	3	1	8	5	+3	33.33	Group Stage
2008	Pan-Pacific Championship	2	0	0	2	1	5	−4	0.00	Fourth Place
2011	AFC Champions League	6	1	2	3	6	11	−5	16.67	Group Stage
2016	AFC Champions League	8	3	3	2	7	7	+0	37.50	Round of 16
2018	AFC Champions League	6	1	3	2	7	8	−1	16.67	Group Stage
2019	AFC Champions League	6	0	3	3	5	11	−6	0.00	Group Stage
2020	AFC Champions League	6	1	2	3	8	10	−2	16.67	Group Stage
2022	AFC Champions League	7	1	2	4	8	9	−1	14.29	Group Stage
2024–25	AFC Champions League Two	12	8	1	3	28	14	+14	66.67	Semi-finals

=== By competition ===
As of 16 April 2025

Competition	Q	Pld	W	D	L	GF	GA	GD	W %
AFC Champions League	7	45	9	18	18	49	61	−12	20.00
AFC Champions League Two	1	12	8	1	3	28	14	+14	66.67
FIFA Club World Cup	1	2	1	0	1	2	2	+0	50.00
OFC Club Championship	1	5	5	0	0	26	4	+22	100.00
Pan-Pacific Championship	1	2	0	0	2	1	5	−4	0.00
**Total**	11	**57**	**17**	**18**	**22**	**84**	**75**	**+9**	**29.82**

=== By country ===
As of 16 April 2025

Confederation	Country	Pld	W	D	L	GF	GA	GD	W %
AFC	**China**	14	4	8	2	23	18	+5	28.57
AFC	**Hong Kong**	2	2	0	0	9	1	+8	100.00
AFC	**Indonesia**	2	1	0	1	4	2	+2	50.00
AFC	**Japan**	16	0	5	11	6	29	−23	0.00
AFC	**Philippines**	3	3	0	0	12	2	+10	100.00
AFC	**South Korea**	14	5	4	5	16	15	+1	35.71
AFC	**Singapore**	2	1	0	1	1	2	−1	50.00
AFC	**Thailand**	2	1	1	0	5	4	+1	50.00
AFC	**Vietnam**	2	0	1	1	1	2	−1	0.00
Total AFC		**56**	**17**	**19**	**20**	**77**	**74**	**+3**	**30.36**
CAF	**Egypt**	1	1	0	0	2	1	+1	100.00
Total CAF		**1**	**1**	**0**	**0**	**2**	**1**	**+1**	**100.00**
CONCACAF	**Costa Rica**	1	0	0	1	0	1	−1	0.00
CONCACAF	**United States**	2	0	0	2	1	5	−4	0.00
Total CONCACAF		**3**	**0**	**0**	**3**	**1**	**6**	**−5**	**0.00**
OFC	**New Caledonia**	1	1	0	0	2	0	+2	100.00
OFC	**New Zealand**	1	1	0	0	3	2	+1	100.00
OFC	**Papua New Guinea**	1	1	0	0	9	2	+7	100.00
OFC	(French Polynesia) **Tahiti**	1	1	0	0	6	0	+6	100.00
OFC	**Vanuatu**	1	1	0	0	6	0	+6	100.00
Total OFC		**5**	**5**	**0**	**0**	**26**	**4**	**+22**	**100.00**

=== By club ===
Competitive matches only. These include OFC Club Championship, AFC Champions League, AFC Champions League Two, FIFA Club World Championship and Pan-Pacific Championship.

As of 16 April 2025

Club	Total						
Club	Pld	W	D	L	GF	GA	GD
(Egypt) Al Ahly	1	1	0	0	2	1	+1
(New Caledonia) AS Magenta	1	1	0	0	2	0	+2
(French Polynesia) AS Pirae	1	1	0	0	6	0	+6
(New Zealand) Auckland City	1	1	0	0	3	2	+1
(Thailand) Bangkok United	2	1	1	0	5	4	0
(Costa Rica) Deportivo Saprissa	1	0	0	1	0	1	–1
(Hong Kong) Eastern	2	2	0	0	9	1	+8
(China) Guangzhou Evergrande	2	1	0	1	2	2	0
(Vietnam) Hoàng Anh Gia Lai	2	0	1	1	1	2	–2
(United States) Houston Dynamo	1	0	0	1	0	3	–3
(Japan) Kashima Antlers	4	0	1	3	2	8	–6
(Japan) Kawasaki Frontale	2	0	0	2	0	5	–5
(Philippines) Kaya–Iloilo	3	3	0	0	12	2	+10
(South Korea) Jeonbuk Hyundai Motors	6	2	2	2	9	8	+1
(Singapore) Lion City Sailors	2	1	0	1	1	2	–1
(United States) LA Galaxy	1	0	0	1	1	2	–1
(Indonesia) Persik Kediri	2	1	0	1	4	2	+2
(South Korea) Pohang Steelers	2	2	0	0	2	0	+2
(Japan) Sanfrecce Hiroshima	2	0	0	2	1	3	–2
(China) Shandong Luneng	2	0	2	0	3	3	0
(China) Shanghai Shenhua	6	2	4	0	8	6	+2
(China) Shanghai SIPG	4	1	2	1	10	7	+3
(Papua New Guinea) Sobou	1	1	0	0	9	2	+7
(South Korea) Suwon Bluewings	4	1	1	2	5	6	–1
(Vanuatu) Tafea	1	1	0	0	6	0	+6
(South Korea) Ulsan Hyundai	2	0	1	1	0	1	–1
(Japan) Urawa Red Diamonds	4	0	3	1	2	4	–2
(Japan) Yokohama F. Marinos	4	0	1	3	1	9	–8
Total	65	23	19	23	106	84	+22

=== By league (home and away record in AFC competitions) ===
Where games were played at a neutral venue, no statistics are displayed (this was the case for the four out of six rescheduled group stage games in the 2020 AFC Champions League and all six group stage games played in the 2022 AFC Champions League, including two against Hoàng Anh Gia Lai from Vietnam).

==== Against Chinese Super League clubs ====
Team	at Home								in China							
Team	Pld	W	D	L	GF	GA	GD	W %	Pld	W	D	L	GF	GA	GD	W %
Guangzhou Evergrande	1	1	0	0	2	1	+1	100.00	1	0	0	1	0	1	−1	0.00
Shandong Luneng	1	0	1	0	2	2	+0	0.00	1	0	1	0	1	1	+0	0.00
Shanghai Shenhua	3	0	3	0	1	1	+0	0.00	3	2	1	0	7	5	+2	66.67
Shanghai SIPG (Note: two group stage matches not included, that were played on neutral grounds.)	1	0	1	0	3	3	+0	0.00	1	0	1	0	2	2	+0	0.00
Total	**6**	**1**	**5**	**0**	**8**	**7**	**+1**	**16.67**	**6**	**2**	**3**	**1**	**10**	**9**	**+1**	**33.33**

==== Against Hong Kong Premier League clubs ====
Team	at Home								in Hong Kong							
Team	Pld	W	D	L	GF	GA	GD	W %	Pld	W	D	L	GF	GA	GD	W %
Eastern	1	1	0	0	5	0	+5	100.00	1	1	0	0	4	1	+3	100.00
Total	**1**	**1**	**0**	**0**	**5**	**0**	**+5**	**100.00**	**1**	**1**	**0**	**0**	**4**	**1**	**+3**	**100.00**

==== Against Philippines Football League clubs ====
Team	at Home								in Philippines							
Team	Pld	W	D	L	GF	GA	GD	W %	Pld	W	D	L	GF	GA	GD	W %
Kaya–Iloilo	2	2	0	0	8	1	+7	100.00	1	1	0	0	4	1	+3	100.00
Total	**2**	**2**	**0**	**0**	**8**	**1**	**+7**	**100.00**	**1**	**1**	**0**	**0**	**4**	**1**	**+3**	**100.00**

==== Against Liga 1 clubs ====
Team	at Home								in Indonesia							
Team	Pld	W	D	L	GF	GA	GD	W %	Pld	W	D	L	GF	GA	GD	W %
Persik Kediri	1	1	0	0	3	0	+3	100.00	1	0	0	1	1	2	−1	0.00
Total	**1**	**1**	**0**	**0**	**3**	**0**	**+3**	**100.00**	**1**	**0**	**0**	**1**	**1**	**2**	**−1**	**0.00**

==== Against J1 League clubs ====
Team	at Home								in Japan							
Team	Pld	W	D	L	GF	GA	GD	W %	Pld	W	D	L	GF	GA	GD	W %
Kashima Antlers	2	0	0	2	0	5	−5	0.00	2	0	1	1	2	3	−1	0.00
Kawasaki Frontale	1	0	0	1	0	4	−4	0.00	1	0	0	1	0	1	−1	0.00
Sanfrecce Hiroshima	1	0	0	1	0	1	−1	0.00	1	0	0	1	1	2	−1	0.00
Urawa Red Diamonds	2	0	2	0	2	2	+0	0.00	2	0	1	1	0	2	−2	0.00
Yokohama F. Marinos (Note: three group stage matches not included, that were played on neutral grounds.)	—	—	—	—	—	—	—	—	1	0	0	1	0	4	−4	0.00
Total	**5**	**0**	**2**	**3**	**2**	**11**	**−9**	**0.00**	**7**	**0**	**2**	**5**	**3**	**12**	**−9**	**0.00**

==== Against K League clubs ====
Team	at Home								in Korea							
Team	Pld	W	D	L	GF	GA	GD	W %	Pld	W	D	L	GF	GA	GD	W %
Jeonbuk Hyundai Motors	2	1	1	0	5	4	+1	50.00	1	1	0	0	2	0	+2	100.00
Pohang Steelers	1	1	0	0	1	0	+1	100.00	1	1	0	0	1	0	+1	100.00
Suwon Bluewings	2	0	1	1	0	2	−2	0.00	2	1	0	1	5	4	+1	50.00
Ulsan Hyundai	1	0	1	0	0	0	+0	0.00	1	0	0	1	0	1	−1	0.00
Total	**6**	**2**	**3**	**1**	**6**	**6**	**+0**	**33.33**	**5**	**3**	**0**	**2**	**8**	**5**	**+3**	**60.00**

==== Against Singapore Premier League clubs ====
Team	at Home								in Singapore							
Team	Pld	W	D	L	GF	GA	GD	W %	Pld	W	D	L	GF	GA	GD	W %
Lion City Sailors	1	1	0	0	1	0	+1	100.00	1	0	0	1	0	2	−2	0.00
Total	**1**	**1**	**0**	**0**	**1**	**0**	**+1**	**100.00**	**1**	**0**	**0**	**1**	**0**	**2**	**−2**	**0.00**

==== Against Thai League 1 clubs ====
Team	at Home								in Thailand							
Team	Pld	W	D	L	GF	GA	GD	W %	Pld	W	D	L	GF	GA	GD	W %
Bangkok United	1	0	1	0	2	2	+0	0.00	1	1	0	0	3	2	+1	100.00
Total	**1**	**0**	**1**	**0**	**2**	**2**	**+0**	**0.00**	**1**	**1**	**0**	**0**	**3**	**2**	**+1**	**100.00**

=== Top goalscorers ===
As of 16 April 2025. Players in bold are still playing for the club.

Rank	Player	Sydney FC career	ACL	ACL2	OFC	CWC	Total
1	(Australia) David Zdrilic	2005–2008	–	–	9	–	9
2	(Australia) Steve Corica	2005–2010	4	–	3	–	7
3	(Australia) Trent Buhagiar	2018–2022	6	–	–	–	6
3	(Poland) **Patryk Klimala**	2024–present	–	6	–	–	6
5	(Morocco) **Anas Ouahim**	2024–present	–	5	–	–	5
5	(Australia) **Adrian Segecic**	2021–present	–	5	–	–	5
7	(Australia) Alex Brosque	2006–2011; 2014–2019	4	–	–	–	4
7	(England) Adam Le Fondre	2018–2020; 2021–2023	4	–	–	–	4
7	(Australia) David Carney	2005–2007; 2015–2018	2	–	1	1	4
7	(Australia) Sasho Petrovski	2005–2007	–	–	4	–	4

== Friendlies ==
During the 2007–08 season Sydney FC hosted LA Galaxy in an exhibition game at ANZ Stadium, Sydney. The match was of important significance in Australia as it brought the legend of the game, David Beckham, to its shores. He did not fail to disappoint, scoring a stunning trademark free kick. Sydney FC won the game 5–3, in front of a record crowd for a Sydney FC match of 80,295.

Sydney had a friendly match in China, with new sister club Shanghai Shenhua. Sydney FC lost the match 2–1, with their goal coming from striker Alex Brosque, who scored halfway through the second half to level the scores at 1–1. John Aloisi, who had a poor last season, showed he had hit form, but being very unlucky to have two goals disallowed during the first half. It was the first game for former Sydney and Socceroos Tony Popovic as caretaker coach.

July 2010 marked a boom for international friendlies with Everton F.C. making an appearance on Sydney shores for a one-off game against Sydney FC. Everton won the match 1–0 courtesy of a Victor Anichebe second half strike. However, that wouldn't be the end of international friendlies for the region as a blockbuster event with three more European teams arriving for the 2010 Sydney Festival of Football. The festival was an international friendly tournament held during the 2010–11 A-League pre-season in Sydney. The teams invited to the tournament included Socceroo Brett Emerton's Blackburn Rovers, Nathan Burns' AEK Athens and Craig Moore's ex-club Rangers F.C. All matches were played at the Sydney Football Stadium. The tournament did not follow a traditional structure as points were also awarded for goals scored during the tournament. Each team played each other once over three matchdays. Sydney FC were placed last at the conclusion of the tournament after failing to win any games and scoring four goals (three of which were by Alex Brosque).

Sydney FC did not participate in any international friendlies again until the 2013–14 season when the club decided to tour to club captain, Alessandro Del Piero's native Italy, playing six sides in the northern part of the country. The results were varied, Sydney finished the tour with three wins, one draw and two losses. Sydney also made a pit-stop in Japan on-route to Italy playing against Sagan Tosu in July, losing 2–1.

The 2014–15 pre-season again saw Sydney FC participating in a friendly tournament, this time in New Zealand. The tour was called the Football United Tour and games were held in Dunedin, Auckland and Wellington over three days. Newcastle United F.C. and West Ham United F.C. were invited to represent the English Premier League and Sydney FC and Wellington Phoenix were the A-League representatives. However they did not play against each other in the tournament. Instead, they each played an English team during the week (in Dunedin or Auckland) and played the other English team in a double-header on the Saturday in Wellington.

The post-season saw even more English world-class clubs arrive in Australia, with London clubs Tottenham Hotspur F.C. and Chelsea F.C. participating in exhibition matches in May and June 2015. Sydney lost both matches by a scoreline of 0–1 despite being very competitive.

After a two-year hiatus, world-renowned English clubs again returned to Australia in May and July 2017. Sydney first played Liverpool F.C., losing 0–3, then Arsenal F.C., losing 0–2.

The notion of football friendly tournaments returned in 2022 and saw the Sydney Super Cup being held for the first time. Celtic were originally due to be joined by rivals Rangers in a four-team three-match tournament, however Everton eventually took Rangers place in the tournament after they withdrew from the tournament on 21 March 2022. The only match Sydney participated in was against Celtic, winning the match 2–1.

=== Match details ===
International Friendlies

27 November 2007	Sydney FC	5–3	(United States) Los Angeles Galaxy	Telstra Stadium, Sydney
	Alex Brosque 5', 25'; Ruben Zadkovich 29'; Robbie Middleby (yellow card) 49', (goal) 53'; Adam Biddle (yellow card) 76'; Iain Fyfe 87'	Report	Kevin Harmse (yellow card) 31' (yellow-red card) 76'; David Beckham 45', (yellow card) 64'; Edson Buddle 49'; Landon Donovan 90'	Attendance: 80,295; Referee: Mark Shield

28 February 2009	Shanghai Shenhua (China)	2–1	Sydney FC	Hongkou Stadium
20:00 AEST	Barcos 32'; Lei 88'	Report	Brosque 58'	Attendance: 10,000

10 July 2010	Sydney FC	0–1	(England) Everton	ANZ Stadium
19:00 AEST		Report	Anichebe 46'	Attendance: 40,466; Referee: Strebre Delovski

25 July 2010 2010 Sydney Festival	Sydney FC	3–5	(Greece) AEK Athens	Sydney Football Stadium
12:45 AEST	Brosque 31' (pen.), 48'; Iyane Thiam 88'	Report	Leonardo 30'; Blanco 36'; Liberopoulos 60'; Scocco 74'; Kafes 76'	Attendance: 14,153; Referee: Ben Williams

28 July 2010 2010 Sydney Festival	Sydney FC	0–0	(Scotland) Rangers	Sydney Football Stadium
19:30 AEST		Report		Attendance: 9,483; Referee: Matthew Breeze

31 July 2010 2010 Sydney Festival	Sydney FC	1–2	(England) Blackburn Rovers	Sydney Football Stadium
19:30 AEST	Brosque 81'	Report	Emerton 37'; Gamst Pedersen 67'	Attendance: 15,237; Referee: Ben Williams

24 July 2013	Sagan Tosu (Japan)	2–1	Sydney FC	Tosu, Japan
	Mizunuma 1', 41'	Report	Grant 24'	Stadium: Tosu Stadium; Attendance: 21,000

7 August 2013 2013 Italy Tour	Padova (Italy)	3–2	Sydney FC	Padova, Italy
4:45 AEST	Vantaggiato 4', 15'; Jelenic 81'	Report	Emerton 8'; Carle 84' (pen.)	Stadium: Stadio Euganeo; Attendance: 15,688

8 August 2013 2013 Italy Tour	Udinese (Italy)	3–5	Sydney FC	Jesolo, Italy
1:00 AEST	Unknown 2'; Unknown 40'; Unknown 48'	Report	Mallia 10', 55'; Marschel 12'; Chianese 30', 89'	Stadium: Stadio Comunale Picchi; Attendance: 3,502

13 August 2013 2013 Italy Tour	Vicenza (Italy)	1–3	Sydney FC	Jesolo, Italy
2:00 AEST	Coser 47'	Report	Chianese 33'; Ryall 40'; Mallia 80'	Stadium: Stadio Comunale Picchi; Attendance: 3,031

14 August 2013 2013 Italy Tour	A.S. Cittadella (Italy)	0–1	Sydney FC	Jesolo, Italy
1:00 AEST		Report	Italiano 35'	Stadium: Stadio Comunale Picchi; Attendance: 3,121

17 August 2013 2013 Italy Tour	Venezia (Italy)	1–0	Sydney FC	Jesolo, Italy
2:00 AEST	Bocalon 3'	Report		Stadium: Stadio Comunale Picchi; Attendance: 4,012

21 August 2013 2013 Italy Tour	Reggiana (Italy)	2–2	Sydney FC	Reggio Emilia, Italy
5:00 AEST	Cais 8'; Viapiana 16'	Report	Gameiro 56'; Carle 59' (pen.)	Stadium: Mapei Stadium; Attendance: 6,873

22 July 2014 2014 Football United Tour	Newcastle United (England)	4–0	Sydney FC	Dunedin, New Zealand
19:30 NZDT	de Jong 19'; Rivière 26'; Yanga-Mbiwa 33'; Armstrong 83'	Report		Stadium: Forsyth Barr Stadium

26 July 2014 2014 Football United Tour	Sydney FC	3–1	(England) West Ham United	Wellington, New Zealand
14:00 NZDT	Gameiro 4', 65'; Brosque 26'		Petković 50' (o.g.)	Stadium: Westpac Stadium

30 May 2015	Sydney FC	0–1	(England) Tottenham Hotspur	Sydney, Australia
20:00 AEST		Report	Kane 43'	Stadium: ANZ Stadium; Attendance: 71,549; Referee: Minhu Lee

2 June 2015	Sydney FC	0–1	(England) Chelsea	Sydney, Australia
20:00 AEST		Report	Remy 30'	Stadium: ANZ Stadium; Attendance: 83,598; Referee: Hungjin Ko

24 May 2017	Sydney FC	0–3	(England) Liverpool	Sydney, Australia
20:00 AEST		Report	Sturridge 7'; Moreno 17'; Firmino 38'	Stadium: ANZ Stadium; Attendance: 72,892; Referee: Peter Green

13 July 2017 2017 Arsenal Tour	Sydney FC	0–2	(England) Arsenal	Sydney, Australia
20:00 AEST		Report	Mertesacker 4'; Lacazette 83'	Stadium: ANZ Stadium; Attendance: 80,432; Referee: Shaun Evans (Australia)

30 July 2019	Paris Saint-Germain (France)	3–0	Sydney FC	Suzhou, China
22:00 AEST	Mbappé 37'; Cavani 43'; Güçlü 89'	Report		Stadium: Suzhou Olympic Sports Centre

17 November 2022 2022 Sydney Super Cup	Sydney FC	2–1	(Scotland) Celtic	Sydney, Australia
19:45 AEDT	Mak 26'; Burgess 60'	Report	Furuhashi 24'	Stadium: Sydney Football Stadium; Referee: Alex King

=== Statistics by club ===
Friendlies
Name	Pld	W	D	L	GF	GA	GD	%
(Italy) Reggiana	1	0	1	0	2	2	+0	0.00
(Greece) AEK Athens	1	0	0	1	3	5	−2	0.00
(England) Arsenal	1	0	0	1	0	2	−2	0.00
(Italy) Cittadella	1	1	0	0	1	0	+1	100.00
(England) Blackburn Rovers	1	0	0	1	1	2	−1	0.00
(Scotland) Celtic	1	1	0	0	2	1	+1	100.00
(England) Chelsea	1	0	0	1	0	1	−1	0.00
(England) Everton	1	0	0	1	0	1	−1	0.00
(England) Liverpool	1	0	0	1	0	3	−3	0.00
(United States) LA Galaxy	1	1	0	0	5	3	+2	100.00
(England) Newcastle United	1	0	0	1	0	4	−4	0.00
(Italy) Padova	1	0	0	1	2	3	−1	0.00
(France) Paris Saint-Germain	1	0	0	1	0	3	−3	0.00
(Scotland) Rangers	1	0	1	0	0	0	+0	0.00
(Japan) Sagan Tosu	1	0	0	1	1	2	−1	0.00
(China) Shanghai Shenhua	1	0	0	1	1	2	−1	0.00
(England) Tottenham	1	0	0	1	0	1	−1	0.00
(Italy) Udinese	1	1	0	0	5	3	+2	100.00
(Italy) Venezia	1	0	0	1	0	1	−1	0.00
(Italy) Vicenza	1	1	0	0	3	1	+2	100.00
(England) West Ham United	1	1	0	0	3	1	+2	100.00
Total	20	6	2	12	29	38	−9	30.00

== See also ==
- Australian soccer clubs in continental competitions
