= 2005 Australian Club World Championship Qualifying Tournament =

Tournament details
- Country: Australia
- Dates: 7–15 May 2005
- Teams: 7

Final positions
- Champions: Sydney FC
- Runners-up: Central Coast Mariners
- Semifinalists: Adelaide United; Perth Glory
- OFC Club Championship: Sydney FC

Tournament statistics
- Matches played: 6
- Goals scored: 11 (1.83 per match)
- Attendance: 48,570 (8,095 per match)
- Top goal scorer: Nik Mrdja (3 goals)

The 2005 Australian Club World Championship Qualifying Tournament was as association football knock-out competition to determine the Australian entrant into the 2005 OFC Club Championship. The tournament consisted of seven teams, being the teams competing in the inaugural A-League season in 2005–06, with the exception of New Zealand Knights.

A standalone tournament was necessary to determine to determine Australia's Oceania Club Championship entrant for the year as there had yet to be any competitive matches for the new A-League clubs. It was to be a one-off competition, with Australia joining the Asian Football Confederation from 2006 onwards, and future continental qualification places determined by teams' performances in the A-League. The competition represented the first competitive matches of any kind for several of the teams. Perth Glory was given a bye in the first round as Champions of the final National Soccer League season.

Sydney FC won the tournament, defeating Central Coast Mariners 1–0 in the final. The final was scheduled to be held at Hindmarsh Stadium in Adelaide but was moved to Express Advocate Stadium in Gosford after two teams based in New South Wales qualified for the game.

== Bracket ==
Round 1 (7 May)
Sydney FC	3
Queensland Roar	0
Central Coast Mariners (p)	0 (4)
Newcastle Jets	0 (2)
Adelaide United (p)	0 (4)
Melbourne Victory	0 (1)

Semi-finals (11 May)
Perth Glory	1
Sydney FC	2
Central Coast Mariners	4
Adelaide United	0

Finals (15 May)
Sydney FC	1
Central Coast Mariners	0

== Matches ==
=== Quarter-finals ===
7 May 2005
17:00 AEST

Sydney FC	3–0	Queensland Roar
Packer 18'; Talay 41' (pen.); Petrovski 53'	Report

Express Advocate Stadium, Gosford
Attendance: 8,000

7 May 2005
19:30 AEST

Central Coast Mariners	0–0 (a.e.t.)	Newcastle Jets
	Report
Penalties
Petrie (penalty scored); Mrdja (penalty scored); Clark (penalty scored); Heffernan (penalty scored)	4–2	Milicic (penalty missed); Parisi (penalty scored); Johnson (penalty scored); Kohler (penalty missed)

Express Advocate Stadium, Gosford
Attendance: 9,809

7 May 2005
19:30 ACST

Adelaide United	0–0 (a.e.t.)	Melbourne Victory
	Report
Penalties
Costanzo (penalty scored); Alagich (penalty scored); Veart (penalty scored); Brain (penalty scored)	4–1	Diaco (penalty scored); Sarkies (penalty missed); Allsopp (penalty missed)

Hindmarsh Stadium, Adelaide
Attendance: 7,254

=== Semi-finals ===
11 May 2005
19:30 AEST

Central Coast Mariners	4–0	Adelaide United
Mrdja 20' (pen.), 43', 65'; Petrie 24'	Report

Express Advocate Stadium, Gosford
Attendance: 4,539

11 May 2005
19:30 WST

Perth Glory	1–2	Sydney FC
Talay 47' (o.g.)	Report	Carney 49'; Petrovski 76'

Members Equity Stadium, Perth
Attendance: 9,968

=== Final ===
15 May 2005

Central Coast Mariners	0–1	Sydney FC
	Report	Carney 18'

Express Advocate Stadium, Gosford
Attendance: 9,627

== Top scorers ==
Rank	Player	Club	Goals
1	(Australia) Nik Mrdja	Central Coast Mariners	3
2	(Australia) David Carney	Sydney FC	2
2	(Australia) Sasho Petrovski	Sydney FC	2
4	(Australia) Andrew Packer	Sydney FC	1
4	(Scotland) Stewart Petrie	Central Coast Mariners	1
4	(Australia) Ufuk Talay	Sydney FC	1
