= 2005 OFC Club Championship =

Tournament details
- Host country: Tahiti
- Dates: Qualifying: 10 February – 6 April 2005; Competition proper: 31 May – 10 June 2005
- Teams: Competition proper: 8 Total: 13 (from 12 associations)

Final positions
- Champions: (Australia) Sydney FC (1st title)
- Runners-up: (New Caledonia) AS Magenta
- Third place: (Vanuatu) Tafea
- Fourth place: (French Polynesia) AS Pirae

Tournament statistics
- Matches played: 16
- Goals scored: 75 (4.69 per match)
- Top scorer(s): (Australia) David Zdrilic (9 goals)

The 2005 OFC Club Championship was the 4th edition of the top-level Oceanic club football tournament organized by the Oceania Football Confederation (OFC), and the 1st since 2001. The tournament was held in Papeete, Tahiti. The preliminary rounds were played from 10 February until 6 April 2005, with the finals beginning on 30 May and ending on 10 June 2005.

The tournament was initially planned to take place in September 2002, in anticipation of the upcoming FIFA Club World Championship in the following year, in order to decide which team would represent Oceania at the tournament. However, this tournament was cancelled, and therefore so too was the Oceanic competition. With the return of the tournament in 2005, the OFC Club Championship went ahead, and the winner went on to represent Oceania at the 2005 FIFA Club World Championship.

The winner of the tournament was Sydney FC of Australia, who beat AS Magenta of New Caledonia in the final.

== Participants ==
Location of teams of the 2005 OFC Club Championship.
Automatic entrants
Preliminary round entrants

The following teams entered the competition.

Association	Team	Qualifying method
Teams entering the group stage
Australia	Sydney FC	2005 Australian Club World Championship Qualifying Tournament winner
(French Polynesia) Tahiti	AS Manu Ura	2003–04 Tahiti Division Fédérale champion
(French Polynesia) Tahiti	AS Pirae	2003–04 Tahiti Division Fédérale runner-up
Teams entering the preliminary round
American Samoa	Manumea FC	2003 ASFA Soccer League champion
Cook Islands	Nikao Sokattak	2004 Cook Islands Round Cup champion
Fiji	Ba Electric	2004–05 Fiji Club Franchise League champion
New Caledonia	AS Magenta	2003–04 New Caledonia Super Ligue champion
New Zealand	Auckland City	2004–05 New Zealand Football Championship grand final champion
Papua New Guinea	Sobou FC	2004 Papua New Guinea National Club Championship champion
Samoa	Tuanaimato Breeze	2004 Samoa National League champion
Solomon Islands	Makuru FC	2004 Honiara FA League champion
Tonga	Lotoha'apai United	2004 Tonga Major League champion
Vanuatu	Tafea FC	2004 Port Vila Football League champion

== Preliminary round ==
A preliminary round was held, with the format being a two-legged playoff to determine who went through to the final round. The preliminary round began on 10 February and ended on 6 April 2005. Ten teams competed in the preliminary round of the 2005 OFC Club Championship.

The Australian representative (Sydney FC), as the representative of the strongest OFC Nation, and the two Tahitian Teams (AS Pirae and AS Manu Ura), as hosts, were seeded to the main draw.

The travelling team played two matches in the host country. The aggregate scores are shown.

Team 1	Agg.	Team 2	1st leg	2nd leg
Manumea (American Samoa)	w/o (Note: Manumea were excluded by the OFC due to the American Samoa Football Association's administrative issues and their failure to guarantee the required facilities and infrastructure to host an international match.)	(New Zealand) Auckland City	—	—
Nikao Sokattak (Cook Islands)	1–9	(New Caledonia) AS Magenta	0–4	1–5
Sobou (Papua New Guinea)	7–0	(Samoa) Tuinaimato Breeze	5–0	2–0
Lotohaʻapai (Tonga)	1–7	(Vanuatu) Tafea	1–2	0–5
Ba Electric (Fiji)	2–8	(Solomon Islands) Makuru	1–4	1–4

Manumea (American Samoa)	Cancelled	(New Zealand) Auckland City
	Report

Auckland City (New Zealand)	Cancelled	(American Samoa) Manumea
	Report

Auckland City won on walkover.

10 February 2005
18:00

Nikao Sokattak (Cook Islands)	0–4	(New Caledonia) AS Magenta
	Report	Hmaé 38', 41' (pen.), 45' (pen.); Jules 62'

OFC Academy Grounds, Auckland
12 February 2005
14:00

AS Magenta (New Caledonia)	5–1	(Cook Islands) Nikao Sokattak
Sinédo ?', ?'; Kaudre ?', ?'; Hmaé ?'	Report	Willis 45' (pen.)

OFC Academy Grounds, Auckland

AS Magenta won 9–1 on aggregate.

4 March 2005

Sobou (Papua New Guinea)	5–0	(Samoa) Tuinaimato Breeze
	Report

6 March 2005

Tuinaimato Breeze (Samoa)	0–2	(Papua New Guinea) Sobou
	Report	Daniel ?'; Laskam ?'

Sobou won 7–0 on aggregate.

21 March 2005

Lotohaʻapai (Tonga)	1–2	(Vanuatu) Tafea
	Report

23 March 2005

Tafea (Vanuatu)	5–0	(Tonga) Lotohaʻapai
Obed ?', ?'; Poida ?'; Garae ?'; Nako ?'	Report

Tafea won 7–1 on aggregate.

2 April 2005

Ba Electric (Fiji)	1–4	(Solomon Islands) Makuru
	Report

6 April 2005

Makuru (Solomon Islands)	4–1	(Fiji) Ba Electric
Maemae ?', ?', ?'; Suri ?'	Report	Masi ?' (pen.)

Makuru won 8–2 on aggregate.

== Group stage ==
The eight remaining teams were separated into two groups, each team playing the other teams once. The top two teams from each group progressed to the semi-finals. The draw for the group stage was held on 16 April 2005.

=== Group A ===
Pos	Team	Pld	W	D	L	GF	GA	GD	Pts	Qualification
1	(Australia) Sydney FC	3	3	0	0	18	4	+14	9	Advance to knockout stage
2	(French Polynesia) AS Pirae	3	2	0	1	6	7	−1	6	Advance to knockout stage
3	(New Zealand) Auckland City	3	1	0	2	8	5	+3	3	
4	(Papua New Guinea) Sobou	3	0	0	3	4	20	−16	0	

Source: RSSSF
31 May 2005
18:30

Sydney FC (Australia)	3–2	(New Zealand) Auckland City
Ceccoli 32'; Packer 47'; Corica 90+3'	Report	Seaman 37'; Smith 78'

Stade Peter, Papeete
Attendance: 4,000
Referee: Leonie Rakaroi (Fiji)
31 May 2005

Sobou (Papua New Guinea)	1–5	(French Polynesia) AS Pirae
Kassam 87'	Report	Bennett 9', 35', 49'; Zaveroni 14', 28'

2 June 2005

AS Pirae (French Polynesia)	1–0	(New Zealand) Auckland City
Bennett 50'	Report

2 June 2005
21:00

Sobou (Papua New Guinea)	2–9	(Australia) Sydney FC
Wate 57'; Daniel 90'	Report	Fyfe 5'; Petrovski 14', 43', 71'; Zdrilic 19', 40', 42'; Brodie 79'; Salazar 82'

Stade Peter, Papeete
Attendance: 3,000

4 June 2005
15:00

Sydney FC (Australia)	6–0	(French Polynesia) AS Pirae
Zdrilic 11', 25', 35', 39'; Buonavoglia 43'; Carney 85'	Report

Stade Peter, Papeete
Attendance: 1,500
Referee: Lencie Fred (Vanuatu)
5 June 2005
20:30

Auckland City (New Zealand)	6–1	(Papua New Guinea) Sobou
Mulrooney 6', 30'; Urlovic 13'; Coombes 18'; Uhlmann 21'; McIvor 87'	Report	Deno 45'

=== Group B ===
Pos	Team	Pld	W	D	L	GF	GA	GD	Pts	Qualification
1	(New Caledonia) AS Magenta	3	2	1	0	10	2	+8	7	Advance to knockout stage
2	(Vanuatu) Tafea	3	2	1	0	6	3	+3	7	Advance to knockout stage
3	(Solomon Islands) Makuru	3	1	0	2	4	9	−5	3	
4	(French Polynesia) AS Manu-Ura	3	0	0	3	2	8	−6	0	

Source: RSSSF
1 June 2005

Tafea (Vanuatu)	3–2	(Solomon Islands) Makuru
Poida 4'; Obed 18' (pen.); Naprapol 56'	Report	Suri 54'; Maemae 79' (pen.)

1 June 2005

AS Magenta (New Caledonia)	4–1	(French Polynesia) AS Manu-Ura
Watrone 32', 56'; Wajoka 43'; Poatinda 62'	Report	Diake 46'

3 June 2005

AS Magenta (New Caledonia)	1–1	(Vanuatu) Tafea
Watrone 39'	Report	Naprapol 13'

3 June 2005

AS Manu-Ura (French Polynesia)	1–2	(Solomon Islands) Makuru
Maemae 6' (pen.)	Report	Lee-Tham 4'; Afia 66'

5 June 2005

AS Manu-Ura (French Polynesia)	0–2	(Vanuatu) Tafea
	Report	Qorig 18'; Naprapol 54'

5 June 2005

Makuru (Solomon Islands)	0–5	(New Caledonia) AS Magenta
	Report	Hmae 33', 62', 81'; Elmour 76' (pen.); Kaudre 81+'

== Knockout stage ==
=== Bracket ===
Semi-finals
7 June – Papeete
(Australia) Sydney FC	6
(Vanuatu) Tafea	0
7 June – Papeete
(New Caledonia) AS Magenta	4
(French Polynesia) AS Pirae	1

Final
10 June – Papeete
(Australia) Sydney FC	2
(New Caledonia) AS Magenta	0
Third place play-off
10 June – Papeete
(French Polynesia) AS Pirae	1
(Vanuatu) Tafea	3

=== Semi-finals ===
7 June 2005
18:00

Sydney FC (Australia)	6–0	(Vanuatu) Tafea
Petrovski 26'; Zdrilic 39'; Talay 44' (pen.); Corica 65', 90'; Salazar 87'	Report

Stade Pater, Papeete
Attendance: 4,000
Referee: Rajendra Singh (Fiji)

7 June 2005

AS Magenta (New Caledonia)	4–1	(French Polynesia) AS Pirae
Elmour 45'; Sinédo 61'; Kaudre 90', 90+1'	Report	Wadriako 17' (o.g.)

=== Third place play-off ===
10 June 2005

AS Pirae (French Polynesia)	1–3	(Vanuatu) Tafea
Bennett 74'	Report	Poida 30'; Mermer 48', 69'

=== Final ===
The final was played on 10 June 2005 at Stade Pater in Papeete. The match was attended by approximately 4,000 spectators.

10 June 2005

Sydney FC	2–0	AS Magenta
Matthew Bingley 16'; David Zdrilic 59'	Report

Stade Pater, Papeete
Attendance: 4,000
Referee: Neil Fox (New Zealand)

Sydney FC	AS Magenta

GK	1	(Australia) Clint Bolton
DF	3	(Australia) Alvin Ceccoli
DF	2	(Australia) Iain Fyfe
DF	8	(Australia) Matthew Bingley
DF	14	(Australia) Andrew Packer
MF	7	(Australia) Robbie Middleby		(substituted off) 76'
MF	15	(Northern Ireland) Terry McFlynn	(yellow card) 84'
MF	6	(Australia) Ufuk Talay	(yellow card) 53'	(substituted off) 62'
MF	12	(Australia) David Carney
FW	9	(Australia) David Zdrilic (c)	(yellow card) 88'	(substituted off) 89'
FW	11	(Australia) Sasho Petrovski
Substitutes:
GK	20	(Australia) Mitchell Blowes
DF	5	(Australia) Steve Laurie
MF	10	(Australia) Steve Corica		(substituted on) 62'
FW	13	(United States) Alejandro Salazar		(substituted on) 89'
MF	16	(Australia) Todd Brodie		(substituted on) 76'
DF	18	(Australia) Wade Oostendorp
DF	19	(Australia) Brendan Renaud
FW	21	(Australia) John Buonavoglia
Manager:
(Germany) Pierre Littbarski

GK	1	(New Caledonia) Michel Hne	(yellow card) 83'
DF	4	(New Caledonia) Andre Sinedo
DF	5	(New Caledonia) Jacky Wiako
DF	6	(New Caledonia) Gil Elmour
DF	17	(New Caledonia) Robert Wadriako
MF	8	(New Caledonia) Jules Wea
MF	10	(New Caledonia) Pierre Wajoka	(yellow card) 41'
MF	2	(New Caledonia) Nicolas Ouka
MF	7	(New Caledonia) Steevens Longue
FW	9	(New Caledonia) Michel Hmae		(substituted off) 77'
FW	11	(New Caledonia) Paul Poatinda		(substituted off) 46'
Substitutes:
GK	20	(New Caledonia) Joel Zohune
DF	3	(New Caledonia) Eric Ouka
DF	12	(New Caledonia) Georges Wadreges
DF	13	(New Caledonia) Elia Kaudre
MF	14	(New Caledonia) Wilfred Wadriako
FW	15	(New Caledonia) Francis Watrone		(substituted on) 77'
FW	16	(New Caledonia) Noel Kaudre		(substituted on) 46'
Manager:
(New Caledonia) Jean Paul Cureau

Man of the Match:
(Northern Ireland) Terry McFlynn

Match rules

- 90 minutes.
- 30 minutes of extra-time if necessary.
- Penalty shoot-out if scores still level.
- Maximum of eight named substitutes.
- Maximum of three substitutions.

== Top scorers ==
NB: This table does not include Preliminary round results

#	Player	Team	Goals
1	(Australia) David Zdrilic	(Australia) Sydney FC	9
