= Ufuk Talay =

Australian soccer player & coach (born 1976)

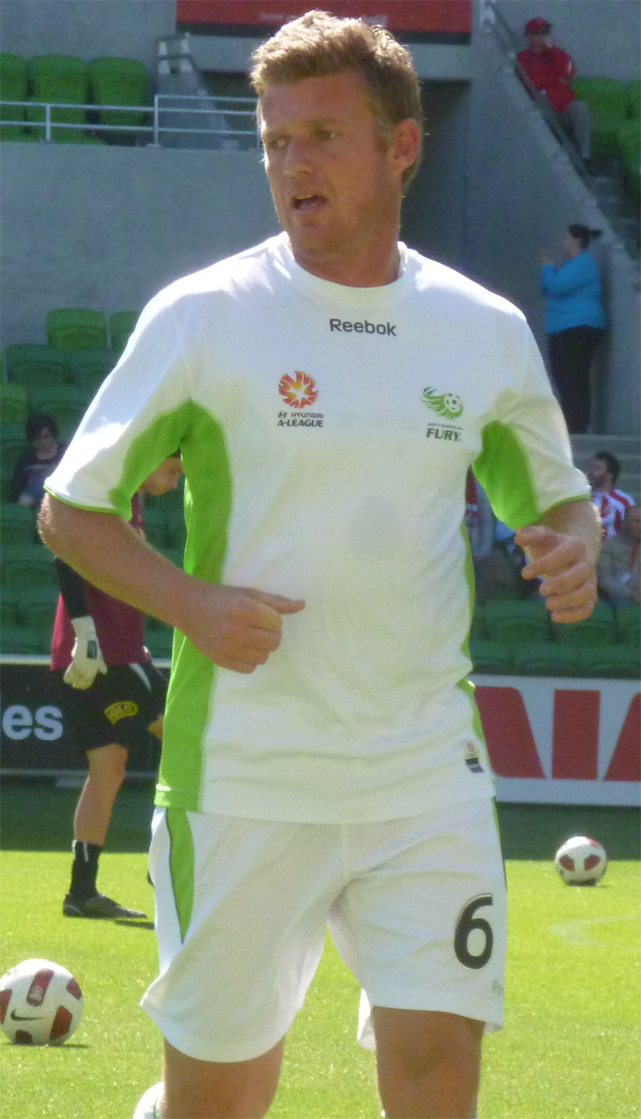
- Talay with North Queensland Fury in 2011

Personal information
- Full name: Ufuk Talay
- Date of birth: 26 March 1976 (age 50)
- Place of birth: Sydney, New South Wales, Australia
- Height: 1.78 m (5 ft 10 in)
- Position: Midfielder

Senior career*
Years	Team	Apps	(Gls)
1992–1995	Marconi Stallions	42	(4)
1995–2002	Galatasaray	28	(1)
1996–1997	→ Antalyaspor (loan)	12	(0)
1997–1998	→ Karabükspor (loan)	20	(3)
1999–2000	→ Bursaspor (loan)	24	(1)
2001–2002	→ Nîmes Olympique (loan)	12	(2)
2002–2004	Gaziantepspor	15	(0)
2004–2005	Mersin İdmanyurdu	23	(1)
2005–2008	Sydney FC	59	(6)
2008	Avispa Fukuoka	37	(5)
2009–2011	North Queensland Fury	33	(3)
2011	Sydney United		(0)
Total		305	(26)

International career
1994–1995	Australia U20	10	(1)

Managerial career
- 2016–2018: Australia U20
- 2019–2023: Wellington Phoenix
- 2023–2026: Sydney FC
- 2026–: Western Sydney Wanderers
Medal record
Representing Australia
Men's Association football
OFC U-20 Championship
Winner	1994 Fiji
- * Club domestic league appearances and goals

Ufuk Talay (Turkish: [ˈufuk taˈlaj]; born 26 March 1976) is a former Australian professional footballer, who is the current head coach of A-League Men club Western Sydney Wanderers.

== Club career ==
Talay first entered a national competition for Marconi-Fairfield in the now defunct NSL, as first an understudy to Steve Corica and later as a midfield partner. He made his debut late in the 92/93 season, playing the last six regular season games and scoring in the final round. Marconi went on to win the grand final with seventeen-year-old Talay watching as an unused substitute. Talay remained with Marconi for a further two years, becoming a regular starter in the first team.

=== Turkey ===
Seeking a more promising career to build on his NSL and national team experience, Talay joined Turkish giants Galatasaray in the Turkish Super League. He spent time on loan out to other sides in the Turkish top flight and lower divisions with Antalyaspor, Karabükspor and Bursaspor, followed by a brief six-month stint in the French second division with Nîmes Olympique, before Galatasaray transferred him to Gaziantepspor in 2002. He shortly moved again to second division side Mersin Idman Yurdu, before being enticed to return to Australia with Sydney FC in the new A-League competition.

=== Sydney FC ===
As the sixteenth player signed to the inaugural Sydney FC squad, Talay sought to reignite his football career and at Sydney was reunited with former Marconi teammates Corica and Matthew Bingley, as well as Clint Bolton and Robbie Middleby whom shared the experience of the Youth World Cup. He has been described by Socceroo Josip Skoko as "the best player to never represent Australia", and Talay has expressed his desire for a full international cap. A motivation for his return to Australia is "the chance to get back in the spotlight and get that Aussie shirt".

His first season was cut short by a knee injury, missing the last seven games (including the grand final) after solid performances in the A-League and Club World Cup. As the 2006/07 season started, Talay found himself on the outer as new coach Terry Butcher favoured a central pairing of Terry McFlynn and Mark Milligan. His early appearances of the season were as a late substitute, before other injuries opened the opportunity to win back a first team place, which he held for the remainder of the year. He also took over penalty-duties for the side, making the most of the opportunity twice in the year. Two yellow cards in the final league match saw Talay suspended for Sydney's first leg final against Newcastle but on return for the second leg he could not prevent the club's elimination.

Following the close of the A-League season, Sydney proceeded on to the AFC Champions League 2007 competition. Talay played all six group-stage games, scoring goals against Shanghai Shenhua and Urawa. In the return match against Shanghai Shenhua, he sensationally hit the crossbar from the penalty spot, Sydney eventually drawing the match 0–0.'

Talay remained with Sydney for the 2007/08 season, continuing into the final season of his original three-year contract, playing every game of the season except one (due to suspension after receiving a fourth yellow card for the year the previous match). In December 2007, it was announced that he would follow former Sydney FC teammate Mark Rudan to Japan, signing with second division side Avispa Fukuoka, the move completed in February at the close of Sydney's season.

=== Avispa Fukuoka ===
Talay Joined fellow Australians Mark Rudan and Newcastle's Joel Griffiths becoming the third Australian in their squad. He was an immediate success, scoring twice in three games, and netting a third in his fifth game.

=== North Queensland Fury FC ===
Talay returned to Australia in 2009 after signing a two-year deal with newly established A-League franchise North Queensland Fury FC, after expressing interest in returning home to his family. He played in their inaugural year, the A-League 2009-10 season and the following season. Talay was recommended as captain by former teammate Robbie Middleby.

=== Sydney United ===
Despite announcing his retirement once North Queensland Fury folded, it was announced on 12 March 2011 that Talay had signed for NSW Premier League club Sydney United.

== International career ==
His first national level selection was for the Young Socceroos in 1994. He joined the squad in a number of Youth World Cup qualifiers and retained his place for the 1995 Youth World Cup in Qatar.

In January 2008, he was named by coach Pim Verbeek in a 22-man Socceroos training camp squad, made up entirely of A-League players, in preparation for the 2010 FIFA World Cup third round qualifiers in Sydney. However, he did not make the final 39-man squad for the qualifiers.

== Coaching career ==
Talay was assistant coach at the FFA Centre of Excellence and the Australia under-17 team, before replacing Paul Okon as head coach of the under-20 team in September 2016. In June 2018, he left his role with the national set-up to join Sydney FC as assistant to Steve Corica, a teammate during his previous spell at the club.

=== Wellington Phoenix ===
==== 2019–20 ====
On 4 May 2019, Talay was announced as head coach for the Wellington Phoenix for the upcoming 2019–20 A-League season. In his first press conference, Talay expressed his idea of building a young team with a strong Kiwi core. Talay had a positive start to his managerial tenure with the Wellington Phoenix when he led them to a 7–0 victory over Wairarapa United in a pre-season friendly in his first match in charge.

His tenure started with four consecutive defeats, the worst start in club history. However, Talay helped the Phoenix achieve a top three finish for the first time in the Phoenix's 13-year history, capping off of a historic season which included a club record-equalling four match winning streak and a nine-match unbeaten run from 10 Nov 2019 to 11 Jan 2020. Talay introduced a fast-paced, free-flowing style of Phoenix football that had many pundits branding the Phoenix as the A-League's most exciting team to watch. Talay reiterated his commitment to the Phoenix, knocking back offers from A-league clubs Melbourne Victory and Western Sydney Wanderers.

In mid-2020, Talay's first year at the helm of Wellington was honoured when he was voted as coach of the A-League Team of the Season.

==== 2020–21 ====
With the Phoenix forced to re-locate to Wollongong, Australia for the entirety of the 2020/21 A-League season, Talay's side finished in seventh place – just one point away from a top six finish. The Phoenix played particularly well in the second half of the campaign, setting a new club record by going 11 matches undefeated to finish out the season. Following the end of the season, Talay said he considered it a privilege to coach the Phoenix. On 21 May 2021, Talay signed a two-year extension to his contract.

==== 2021–22 ====
In his third season in charge, Talay guided the Phoenix to a sixth-placed finish securing a playoff spot in the finals series. They lost 1–0 to eventual winners Western United in the elimination final. Despite the early exit, the Phoenix exceeded expectations to finish sixth and qualify for the finals series given all the obstacles they had to overcome in 2021–22, such as spending the majority of the season away from home due to COVID-19 travel restrictions.

==== 2022–23 ====
In April 2023, Talay announced that he would leave Wellington Phoenix at the end of his contract. The club announced the following week that his assistant, Giancarlo Italiano would replace him.

=== Sydney FC ===
On 8 November 2023, Talay returned to Sydney FC as their head coach three rounds into the 2023–24 season, replacing former teammate Steve Corica. Talay's first match in charge was a 5–1 win over Adelaide United at Coopers Stadium, with Sydney taking a 4–0 in the first half. Talay guided Sydney FC away from the bottom of the table, with the club enjoying an eight match unbeaten run from January to March 2024. The clubs inconsistent form in the final third of the season would see Sydney FC finish fourth at the end of the season. In the 2024 A-League Men finals series, Talay's side would be eliminated in the semi-finals, losing 2–1 on aggregate to the Central Coast Mariners.

Sydney FC missed the finals by a point in Talay's second season in charge in the 2024-25 season, finishing seventh.

With 5 matches to go in the 2025–26 season, his third season in charge, Talay was sacked by Sydney FC despite the team sitting in fifth position at the time, six points safe inside the finals qualifying positions. This came days after reported talks between Talay and the Western Sydney Wanderers over a potential managerial role for the 2026–27 season.

=== Western Sydney Wanderers ===
On 30 March 2026, Talay was announced as head coach of Western Sydney Wanderers, on a two-year deal starting from the 2026–27 season. The move was met with controversy due to the rivalry between the two clubs, with Australian website Football360 calling it "the most staggering hire in A-League history". He previously denied having talks with Western Sydney Wanderers.

== Personal life ==
Talay is of Turkish descent, and is able to speak Turkish fluently.

== Career statistics ==
(correct as of 17 December 2018)

Appearances and goals by club, season and competition
Club	Season	League (Note: National Soccer League and A-League statistics include final series matches)			National Cup		Continental		Other (Note: Includes A-League Pre-Season Challenge Cup, OFC Club Championship Qualifying Tournament, and FIFA Club World Cup)		Total	
Club	Season	Division	Apps	Gls	Apps	Gls	Apps	Gls	Apps	Gls	Apps	Gls
Marconi-Fairfield	1992–93	NSL	6	1	0	0	—		—		6	1
Marconi-Fairfield	1993–94	NSL	21	1	—		—		—		21	1
Marconi-Fairfield	1994–95	NSL	15	2	0	0	—		—		15	2
Marconi-Fairfield	Total		42	4	0	0	—		—		42	4
Galatasaray	1995–96	1.Lig	12	1	7	0	0	0	—		19	1
Galatasaray	1996–97	1.Lig	1	0	0	0	0	0	—		1	0
Galatasaray	1997–98	1.Lig	0	0	0	0	0	0	—		0	0
Galatasaray	1998–99	1.Lig	8	0	4	0	1 (Note: Appearance in UEFA Champions League)	0	—		13	0
Galatasaray	1999–2000	1.Lig	0	0	0	0	0	0	—		0	0
Galatasaray	2000–01	1.Lig	0	0	0	0	0	0	—		0	0
Galatasaray	2001–02	Süper Lig	0	0	0	0	0	0	—		0	0
Galatasaray	Total		21	1	11	0	1	0	—		33	1
Antalyaspor (loan)	1996–97	1.Lig	12	1	—		—		—		12	1
Karabükspor (loan)	1997–98	1.Lig	20	3	—		—		—		20	3
Bursaspor (loan)	1999–2000	1.Lig	24	1	—		—		—		24	1
Bursaspor (loan)	2000–01	1.Lig	0	0	—		—		—		0	0
Nîmes Olympique (loan)	2001–02	French Division 2	12	2	—		—		—		12	2
Gaziantepspor	2002–03	Süper Lig	15	0	—		—		—		15	0
Gaziantepspor	2003–04	Süper Lig			—		—		—			
Mersin İdmanyurdu	2004–05	Lig A	23	1	—		—		—		23	1
Sydney FC	2005–06	A-League	16	1	—		4	1	7	1	27	3
Sydney FC	2006–07	A-League	21	2	—		6	2	4	0	31	4
Sydney FC	2007–08	A-League	22	3	—		—		5	1	27	4
Sydney FC	Total		59	6	—		10	3	11	1	85	11
Avispa Fukuoka	2008	J2 League	37	5	—		—		—		37	5
North Queensland Fury	2009–10	A-League	11	0	—		—		—		11	0
North Queensland Fury	2010–11	A-League	22	3	—		—		—		20	3
North Queensland Fury	Total		33	3	—		—		—		33	3
Career total			261	27	11	0	11	3	11	1	294	31

== Managerial statistics ==
As of match played 30 March 2026

Managerial record by team and tenure
Team	From	To	Record				
Team	From	To	G	W	D	L	Win %
(New Zealand) Wellington Phoenix FC	4 May 2019	5 May 2023	115	48	24	43	41.74
(Australia) Sydney FC	8 November 2023	24 March 2026	78	39	14	25	50.00
Career Total			193	87	38	68	45.08

== Honours ==
=== Player ===
Marconi Stallions

- NSL Championship: 1992–93

Galatasaray

- Süper Lig: 1998–99
- Turkish Cup: 1995–96

Sydney FC

- A-League Championship: 2005–06
- Oceania Club Championship: 2005

Australia U-20

- OFC U-20 Championship: 1994
