= Iain Fyfe =

Australian soccer player (born 1982)

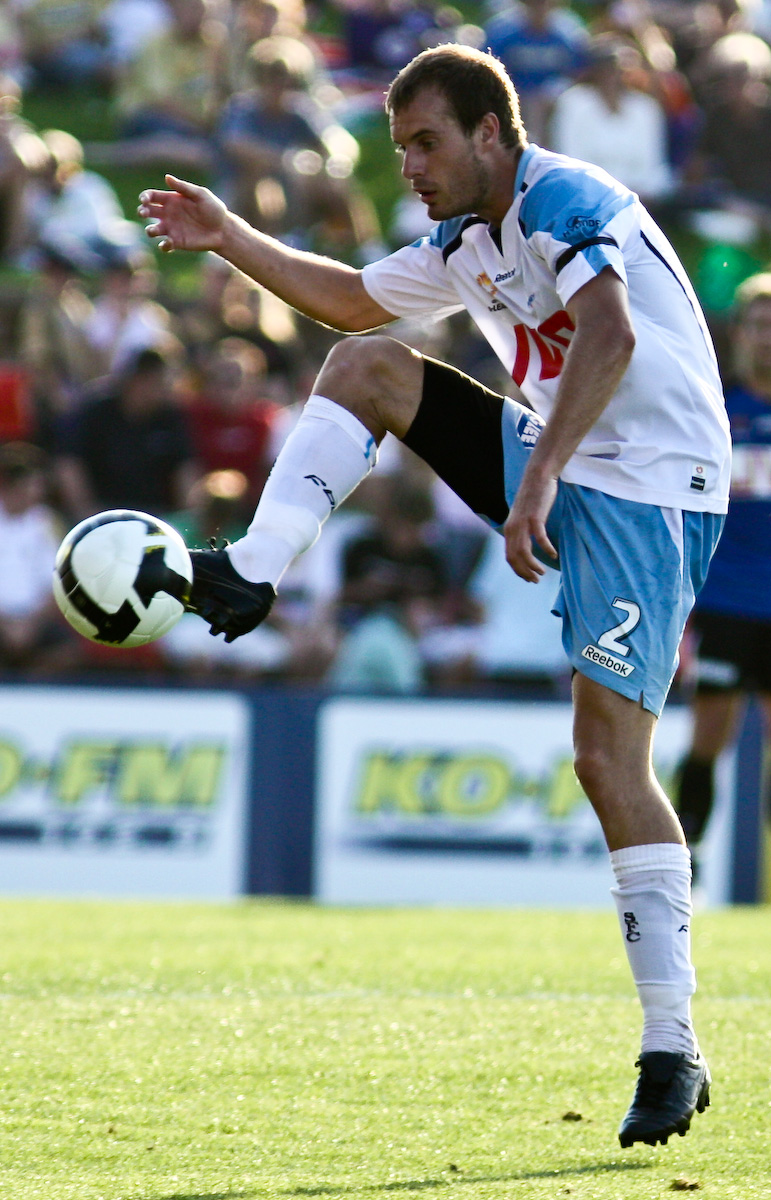
- Fyfe playing for Sydney FC in 2008

Personal information
- Full name: Iain Stuart Fyfe
- Date of birth: 3 April 1982 (age 44)
- Place of birth: Adelaide, Australia
- Height: 1.85 m (6 ft 1 in)
- Position: Centre back

Youth career
- Salisbury United
- 1999–2000: SASI

Senior career*
Years	Team	Apps	(Gls)
2000–2003	Adelaide City	55	(6)
2003	Enfield City	1	(0)
2003–2004	Sydney Olympic	23	(0)
2004–2005	Hamilton Academical	15	(0)
2005–2009	Sydney FC	88	(4)
2009–2011	Adelaide United	52	(5)
2011–2012	Busan I'Park	8	(1)
2012–2013	Adelaide United	23	(0)
2013–2014	Mes Kerman	14	(0)
2014–2019	Campbelltown City	116	(24)
2016	→ Newcastle Jets (loan)	3	(0)
2022	Playford City	12	(0)
Total		410	(40)

International career^{‡}
1999	Australia U-17	10	(1)
2001	Australia U-20	2	(0)
2003	Australia U-23	5	(1)

Managerial career
- 2020–2021: Campbelltown City
- 2024: Croydon FC (assistant)
- 2024: Croydon FC
- * Club domestic league appearances and goals as of 19 August 2022 ‡ National team caps and goals as of 28 October 2010

Iain Stuart Fyfe

(born 3 April 1982) is a retired[2] Australian A-League professional footballer.

== Club career ==
On completion of his SASI program in 2000, Iain joined hometown NSL club Adelaide City. After just three appearances off the bench in 2000–01, he broke into the Adelaide first team the following season, making 52 appearances in two years before moving to Sydney Olympic in 2003. He also earned a call up to the Australian Under-23 side for a friendly against Spain, but it would be the only one. Domestically, his move was positive, becoming a key figure for Olympic, playing all-but-one matches of the 2003–04 season.

=== Scotland ===
Following the collapse of the NSL after that season, Fyfe went overseas and trialled at various clubs, including Scottish Premier League side Hibernian, before signing for Hamilton Academical in the Scottish Second Division. There he played alongside fellow Australians, David Carney as well as childhood friend and former Adelaide City teammate Scott Tunbridge. Fyfe struggled to break into the Hamilton first team, making only fifteen appearances before being released in early 2005.

=== Sydney FC ===
Partnered next to first Mark Rudan and later Jacob Timpano, Fyfe was in the Sydney first XI for much of the A-League season. However, he was dropped to the bench for the penultimate round due to inconsistent form. Several strong performances from Rudan kept him there, making only one start and three appearances off the bench in the club's last five games, although a missed match was through suspension. In the A-League grand final, Fyfe played an important role in defending Sydney's 1–0 lead over the Central Coast Mariners, having replaced injured Mark Rudan with 20 minutes remaining.

In the 2006–07 season, Fyfe was shifted to a wide defensive role by new coach Terry Butcher, who opted to play Mark Milligan in midfield rather than his usual right back position. The impact of the move was immediately apparent with Fyfe, goal-less in the previous season, scoring the winning goal against Central Coast in the opening round and netting again in the 3–2 loss to Melbourne Victory a week later. He went on to play every match of the season up until Sydney's semi-final exit. Strong performances led to another call up to the national team, included in the A-League-based Australian side for the 2007 Asian Cup qualifier against Kuwait on 16 August 2006, but again did not make an appearance.

During the Pan-Pacific Championship Iain played his 100th competitive game against Major League Soccer Glamour team Los Angeles Galaxy. Sydney went on to lose the match 2–1, with Sydney's goal coming from Brendan Renaud. He was Sydney's most capped player, and most consistent, only missing 3 competitive matches, in the 3 years Sydney have played in the A-League.

=== Adelaide United ===
On 24 November 2008, it was announced in November that Iain had signed a contract with Adelaide United commencing April 2009; this brings Fyfe back to Adelaide where he began his career after 5 years playing in Sydney and Scotland. Starting all the games in the opening of his first season back at Adelaide, Fyfe's first goal allowed his club to equalise against Wellington Phoenix in round five.

He scored his second goal for Adelaide in a 1–1 draw against Central Coast Mariners in Round 2 of the 2010–11 season. On 14 January 2011, it was announced that Iain would be joining K-league club Busan I'Park FC. His farewell game for Adelaide was meant to be on 29 January 2011 against Central Coast Mariners at Hindmarsh Stadium, but due to a hamstring injury his last game was on 21 January 2011 against North Queensland Fury when they won 8–1.

=== Busan I'Park ===
In January 2011, Fyfe joined South Korean club Busan I'Park. Fyfe made his first start and debut for Busan I'Park in their 2–1 away loss to Jeju United in the first week of the 2011 K-League season.

=== Return to Adelaide United ===
On 29 February 2012, it was announced that Fyfe had signed a one-year undisclosed contract with club Adelaide United after his contract with South Korea K-League club Busan I'Park.

=== Mes Kerman ===
He was linked to a move to the Iran Pro League in summer 2013. On 2 August 2013, Mes Kerman announced that Fyfe will be joined to the team after passing medical test. He officially joined to the team on 10 August and signed a two years contract. He made his debut in a 1–0 loss to Saipa.

=== Newcastle Jets ===
In November 2016, Fyfe signed a short-term deal to return to the A-League with Newcastle Jets as an injury replacement for Daniel Mullen, joining from South Australian club Campbelltown City.

== International career ==
Fyfe started his career in 1999, joining a talent identification program at the South Australian Sports Institute, and was soon exposed to the international football stage. He was selected for the Australian U17 side in qualifying matches for the 1999 FIFA U-17 World Championship and retained his place in the Joeys squad for the final tournament in New Zealand. Australia marched through to the final against Brazil, the match ending scoreless after extra time and proceeding to penalties. Fyfe entered the match as a substitute in extra time to secure the defence, but in the shoot-out he was tasked with Australia's ninth penalty kick. His shot was dramatically saved by goalkeeper Rubinho, allowing Brazil to take the title.

On 16 February 2005, Iain Fyfe returned to Australia became the 16th member of the inaugural Sydney FC squad. Playing at centre back under coach Pierre Littbarski, Fyfe was instrumental in Sydney's qualification for the 2005 FIFA Club World Championship, being named Player of the Tournament for the 2005 Oceania Club Championship. This prompted his inclusion in a Socceroo training camp with new manager Guus Hiddink, and his inclusion on the substitutes bench for the World Cup qualifier against Solomon Islands.

== Honours ==
=== Club ===
Sydney FC

- A-League Championship: 2005–06
- Oceania Club Championship: 2005

Campbelltown City

- National Premier Leagues South Australia: 2016

=== Country ===
Australia

- OFC U-17 Championship: 1999

=== Individual ===
- Oceania Club Championship Player of the Tournament: 2005

== Career statistics ==
(correct as of 4 February 2014)

Club	League	Season	League		Playoffs		Cup		Int'l Cup		Total	
Club	League	Season	Apps	Gls	Apps	Gls	Apps	Gls	Apps	Gls	Apps	Gls
Adelaide City	NSL	2000–01	3	0	-	-	-	-	-	-	3	0
Adelaide City	NSL	2001–02	23	0	-	-	-	-	-	-	23	0
Adelaide City	NSL	2002–03	20	3	9	2	-	-	-	-	29	5
Sydney Olympic FC	NSL	2003–04	23	0	-	-	-	-	-	-	23	0
Hamilton Academical F.C.	SFL	2004–05	15	0	-	-	-	-	-	-	15	0
Sydney FC	A-League	2005–06	21	0	2	0	4	0	2	0	29	0
Sydney FC	A-League	2006–07	21	2	2	0	6	0	6	0	35	2
Sydney FC	A-League	2007–08	15	0	-	-	3	0	-	-	18	0
Adelaide United	A-League	2009–10	26	1	-	-	-	-	-	-	26	1
Adelaide United	A-League	2010–11	26	4	-	-	-	-	-	-	26	4
Busan I'Park	K-League	2011	8	1	-	-	7	0	-	-	15	1
Mes Kerman	Pro League	2013–14	11	0	-	-	3	1	-	-	14	1
Career totals											255	14

'International Cup' matches refer to AFC and Club World Cup competitions.
