= Steve Laurie =

Australian soccer player

Personal information
- Date of birth: 30 October 1982 (age 43)
- Place of birth: Melbourne, Australia
- Position: Defender

Team information
- Current team: Geelong Soccer Club

Youth career
- 1997: VIS
- 1998–02: West Ham United

Senior career*
Years	Team	Apps	(Gls)
2002–2003	Peterborough United	0	(0)
2003–2004	South Melbourne FC	19	(1)
2005–2006	Sydney FC	1	(0)
2006–2007	Oakleigh Cannons	24	(1)
2008–2009	Altona Magic	44	(0)
2011–2014	Bentleigh Greens	6	(0)

International career^{‡}
	Australia U20	4	(0)

Managerial career
- 2015–: Geelong SC
- * Club domestic league appearances and goals as of 26 May 2009 ‡ National team caps and goals as of 26 May 2009

Steven Laurie (born 30 October 1982) is an Australian former association football player who played as a defender. He played in England with West Ham United's youth academy and Peterborough United, before returning to Australia to play for South Melbourne FC in the National Soccer League and Sydney FC in the A-League. He is currently the head manager of Geelong SC.

== Playing career ==
Steve Laurie started his professional youth career with the Victorian Institute of Sport, spending a year at the academy in 1997, before moving to England, joining the youth academy of West Ham United F.C. in 1998. Laurie remained with the Hammers academy until 2002, then moved to Peterborough United F.C.

He returned to Australia after being lured back by former Rangers F.C. player and then coach Stuart Munro to play for National Soccer League powerhouse South Melbourne FC in the last season of the NSL.

Laurie was one of the first six signings for the newly formed Hyundai A-League club Sydney FC, although later he was released from his contract via mutual consent, making just one appearance in his time with the Blues. The inaugural coach of Sydney FC was German World Cup winner Pierre Littbarski, with whom Laurie had a falling-out. Players at Sydney FC that Laurie joined included former Manchester United legend Dwight Yorke.

After returning to Victoria, Laurie played for South Melbourne once more, as well as a season at Oakleigh Cannons. Then Steve Laurie moved to Altona Magic and was promoted to captain in 2009, and led the club to a championship win over the highly fancied Dandenong Thunder coached by Laurie's former coach at South Melbourne and then Oakleigh Cannons, Stuart Munro. 2009 was a watershed season for Laurie as the giant defender had an injury-free season and was able to show all football fans why he had been on West Ham's books as a youngster.

A number of A-League Clubs have chased Laurie after the Victorian Premier League finals finished, although he opted to have a stint in Asia with Shanghai Shenhua.

== Coaching career ==
After his stint in Asia, Laurie decided to move into coaching. He assisted long-time friend Toby Paterson at National Premier Leagues Victoria 1 side St Albans Saints SC in 2014, departing late in the season when Paterson was sacked.

Laurie was given his first senior head managing position at Victorian State League 2 North West side Geelong SC in 2015. Laurie recruited a number of quality players and helped the club recover from a poor start to finish in 6th place.
