= Andrew Packer =

Australian soccer player

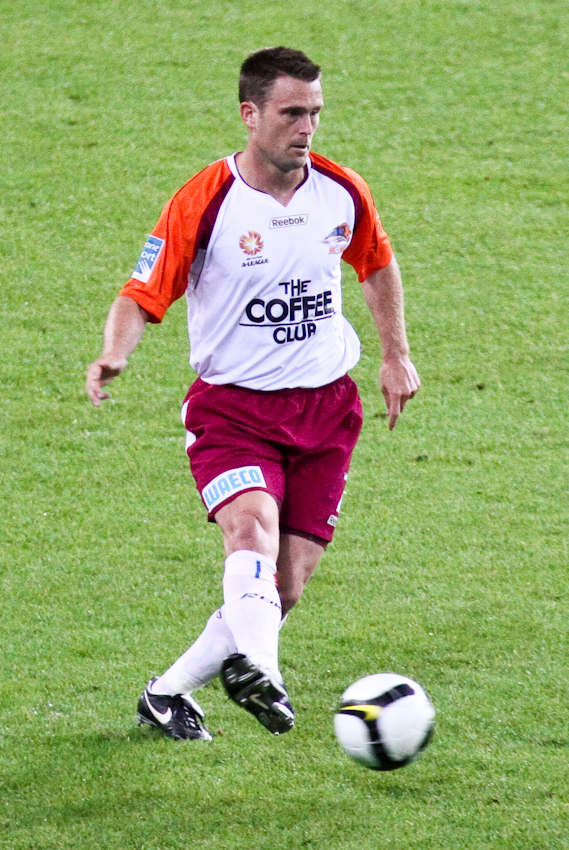
- Packer playing for Queensland Roar in 2008

Personal information
- Full name: Andrew Packer
- Date of birth: 16 June 1980 (age 46)
- Place of birth: Ipswich, Australia
- Height: 1.80 m (5 ft 11 in)
- Position: Right back

Senior career*
Years	Team	Apps	(Gls)
1997–1999	Brisbane Strikers	1	(0)
1999	Taringa Rovers		
1999–2000	Carlton	38	(0)
2001–2003	Sydney Olympic	67	(8)
2003	Cork City	1	(0)
2003–2004	Perth Glory	5	(0)
2004	Queensland Lions		
2005–2006	Sydney FC	20	(1)
2006–2010	Brisbane Roar	67	(0)

International career
- Australia U-17
- * Club domestic league appearances and goals

Andrew Packer (born 16 June 1980 in Ipswich, Queensland, Australia) is a former Australian footballer.

== Biography ==
He attended St. Josephs Nudgee College in Brisbane. He was a member of Sydney FC's Grand Final winning side in 2005–06. In 2006, he was signed in his native state by Queensland Roar. Packer announced his retirement from football at age 29 and joined the Australian Defence Force.

== A-League statistics ==
Club	Season	League^{1}		Cup		International^{2}		Total	
Club	Season	Apps	Goals	Apps	Goals	Apps	Goals	Apps	Goals
Sydney FC	2005–06	20	1	0	0	0	0	20	1
Sydney FC	Total	20	1	0	0	0	0	20	1
Brisbane Roar	2006–07	21	0	0	0	0	0	21	0
Brisbane Roar	2007–08	14	0	0	0	0	0	14	0
Brisbane Roar	2008–09	22	0	0	0	0	0	22	0
Brisbane Roar	2008–09	10	0	0	0	0	0	10	0
Brisbane Roar	Total	67	0	0	0	0	0	67	0
Career Total		87	1	0	0	0	0	87	1

^{1} – includes A-League final series statistics
^{2} – includes FIFA Club World Cup statistics; AFC Champions League statistics are included in season commencing after group stages (i.e. ACL and A-League seasons etc.)

== Honours ==
Sydney Olympic NSL 2001–02, 2002–2003.

With Perth Glory:

- NSL: 2003–04

With Sydney FC:

- A-League Championship: 2005–06
- Oceania Club Championship: 2004–05
