= Wade Oostendorp =

Australian soccer player

Personal information
- Full name: Wade Oostendorp
- Date of birth: 20 April 1988 (age 38)
- Place of birth: Sydney, Australia
- Height: 1.83 m (6 ft 0 in)
- Position: Centre back

Youth career
- 2004: AIS

Senior career*
Years	Team	Apps	(Gls)
2005–2006	Sydney FC	0	(0)
2006–2009	Marconi Stallions		
2010–2011	Bonnyrigg White Eagles	34	(1)
2012–2014	Marconi Stallions	23	(0)
2014–2015	Dapto Dandaloo Fury	43	(1)
2016	Mounties Wanderers	26	(2)
2017	Sutherland Sharks	15	(0)
2018	Mounties Wanderers	4	(0)

International career^{‡}
2005	Australia U-17	3	(0)
2006	Australia U-20	1	(0)
- * Club domestic league appearances and goals as of 17 September 2018 ‡ National team caps and goals as of 02:36, 10 August 2010 (UTC)

Wade Oostendorp (born 20 April 1988) is an Australian footballer who plays for Dapto Dandaloo Fury in the Illawarra Premier League.

== Club career ==
Oostendorp started his career at the Australian Institute of Sport and was soon signed by new A-League club Sydney FC.

He has played for Marconi Stallions and Bonnyrigg White Eagles in the New South Wales Premier League.

He has already represented his country at international level, playing 3 games for the Australian U-17's during the 2005 FIFA U-17 World Championship
