= David Carney =

Australian soccer player (born 1983)

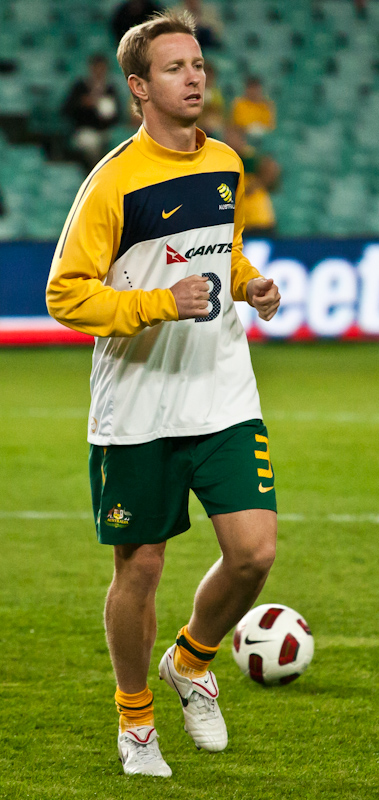
- Carney with Australia in 2010

Personal information
- Full name: David Raymond Carney
- Date of birth: 30 November 1983 (age 42)
- Place of birth: Sydney, Australia
- Height: 1.81 m (5 ft 11 in)
- Positions: Midfielder; defender

Youth career
- 1998–1999: NSWIS
- 1999–2002: Everton

Senior career*
Years	Team	Apps	(Gls)
2002–2003	Everton	0	(0)
2003–2004	Oldham Athletic	0	(0)
2004	Halifax Town	3	(0)
2004–2005	Hamilton Academical	8	(0)
2005–2007	Sydney FC	38	(7)
2007–2009	Sheffield United	21	(2)
2009	→ Norwich City (loan)	9	(0)
2009–2010	Twente	11	(0)
2010–2011	Blackpool	11	(0)
2011–2012	Alcorcón	3	(0)
2012	Bunyodkor	4	(1)
2013	New York Red Bulls	9	(0)
2014–2016	Newcastle Jets	37	(3)
2016–2018	Sydney FC	56	(9)
Total		210	(22)

International career
2003	Australia U20	2	(0)
2008	Australia Olympic (O.P.)	3	(0)
2006–2013	Australia	48	(6)

Managerial career
- 2023–2024: Wollongong Wolves
Medal record
Men's football
Representing Australia
AFC Asian Cup
Runner-up	2011
- * Club domestic league appearances and goals

David Raymond Carney (born 30 November 1983) is an Australian former soccer player and coach.

A midfielder, he began his playing career with the New South Wales Institute of Sport before moving to England to join Everton. Having failed to break into the Everton first team he then moved to Oldham Athletic, Halifax Town and Hamilton Academical in Scotland before returning to his native Australia. After a successful spell with Sydney FC in A-League, Carney then returned to England, signing with Sheffield United before spending time with Norwich City on loan and eventually moving to the Netherlands to play for Twente. He subsequently had spells with Blackpool, Alcorcón, Bunyodkor, Newcastle Jets and New York Red Bulls as well as making 48 appearances for the Australia national side for whom he scored six goals.

== Club career ==
=== Everton Junior ===
Sydney-born Carney attended Robert Townson Primary School in Campbelltown, New South Wales. At the age of 16, Carney moved to England after impressing in a trial match and signing for Everton. There he played in various youth and reserve teams alongside Manchester United star Wayne Rooney, most notably at the 2002 FA Youth Cup final. After not securing a permanent contract at Everton F.C., he left the club in 2003. David Moyes told Carney upon releasing him "...sometimes you need to take one step back to take another one forward." He had brief stints on month-to-month contracts at Oldham Athletic and Hamilton Academical before electing to return to Australia.

=== Sydney FC ===
Carney trialled for newly formed A-League side Sydney FC in March 2005 and was signed to a one-year deal after impressing coach Pierre Littbarski. He was an immediate success at the club, scoring twice at the Club World Championship Australian Qualifying Tournament, including the only goal of the final, and again at the Oceania Club Championship to help ensure the club's qualification for the Club World Championship. On 16 December 2005, Carney scored the winning goal against African champions El Ahly to secure Sydney FC 5th place at the tournament.

In the 2005–06 A-League season, Carney was an essential part of Sydney FC's success. He made 24 appearances (22 starts), scoring 6 goals and creating a further 6 assists. His dribbling and occasional goal poaching made Carney a genuine crowd favourite at Sydney FC and he subsequently attracted the attention of a number of clubs in Europe.

==== Overseas trials ====
Carney's initial contract expired at the end of the 2006 season, and after strong rumours linking a move to Romanian club Steaua București, he was offered trials in Germany at Bundesliga side Borussia Mönchengladbach and promoted second division club Alemannia Aachen. Despite scoring twice in a trial match and being offered a deal by Aachen he decided against signing for the club, citing "the language factor" as the main reason for declining the move.

==== 2006–07 season ====
He remained loyal to Sydney FC and re-signed for another season. A shoulder injury required surgery and sidelined him for the early part of the season. He made 14 appearances (12 starts), scoring one goal and providing 2 assists. Carney played in Sydney FC's appearances in the AFC Champions League and his good form was rewarded with selection in the Australian national team to play a friendly match against Uruguay in Sydney, and in the AFC Asian Cup tournament in Thailand and Malaysia.

=== Sheffield United ===
Carney joined English Championship side Sheffield United in August 2007 for a transfer fee of A$125,000. Carney played 90 minutes in each of Sheffield United's first two Football League Cup ties, setting up two goals. He made his first starting appearance in the Championship for Sheffield United in a 2–0 defeat at Bristol City on 6 October 2007. These performances and his displays in the Australian national team reportedly led to interest from German clubs Bayern Munich, VfL Bochum and Kaiserslautern; and a £2.3 million bid from Belgian champions Anderlecht.

Carney steered Sheffield United past Premier League side Bolton Wanderers, securing a position in the fourth round of the FA Cup, with the only goal of the third round tie. Having been rested for the fourth round tie with Manchester City, Carney scored the equaliser for the Blades in their league match against Watford in January 2008 followed by a slick finish for the equaliser at Colchester United in the same week before flying out to Melbourne for Australia's first World Cup qualifier on 6 February.

Since Kevin Blackwell became manager of Sheffield United in February 2008, Carney was "effectively frozen out of the first team." In August 2009, it was speculated that Blackwell was so eager to leave Carney out of the first team that he named a squad one substitute short, despite Carney recently scoring a cracking goal whilst on international duty.

=== Norwich City ===
In January 2009 Carney joined Norwich City on loan until the end of the season, becoming Bryan Gunn's first signing as Norwich manager. Carney would link up again with new first-team coach Ian Crook, with whom he worked at Sydney FC. Carney made his first appearance for the club coming on as a substitute in the 3–3 away draw to Wolves on 3 February.

=== FC Twente ===
In August 2009 Sheffield United agreed to the sale of Carney to Dutch Eredivisie side FC Twente in what was reported to be a two-year deal with a third year extension option. Shoulder surgery in December 2009 restricted Carney's number of appearances but he recovered in time to be fit for the end of the season in which the club won the Dutch League title for the first time in their history. In August 2010, Carney played in FC Twente's 1–0 win over Ajax to win the Dutch Super Cup.

=== Blackpool ===
On 1 September 2010, Carney signed a one-year deal, with an option for a further year, with Blackpool, who were newly promoted to the Premier League. He made his Premier League debut on 11 September 2010, coming off the bench in the 85th minute in Blackpool's 2–0 win at Newcastle United. Carney got his first start in the Premier League against Aston Villa on 10 November. He left Blackpool at the end of his contract after they were relegated to the Championship.

=== Alcorcón ===
In October 2011 Carney joined Spanish Segunda División club Alcorcón on a one-year deal. Carney made his debut for the club in a league match against Gimnàstic de Tarragona. After failing to hold down a first team spot he mutually terminated his contract with the club.

=== Bunyodkor ===
On 10 February 2012, Carney joined Uzbek League team FC Bunyodkor on trial. On 18 February 2012, the club signed Carney to play in the 2012 Uzbek League, which runs from March to September with a possible return to the A-League for the 2012–13 season. Carney made his debut for Bunyodkor in their 2–1 defeat to Adelaide United in the AFC Champions League on 6 March playing for 64 minutes. Carney made his league debut for Bunyodkor on 26 March, coming on as a 72nd-minute substitute for Shavkat Salomov in their 2–2 draw against Qizilqum Zarafshon. Carney scored his first goal for Bunyodkor in their 3–1 victory over Metallurg Bekabad on 26 April. On 18 September, it was revealed that Carney was deemed surplus to requirements at Bunyodkor with the coach citing that performances at club level were not as good as performances for the national team. It was finally confirmed on 29 September, that Carney was released from the club after spending weeks without playing for the team and chasing money owed to him. Following his release, Carney's agent believed he would sign for a Championship side in England.

=== New York Red Bulls ===
Carney signed with Major League Soccer club New York Red Bulls on 8 August 2013, a move that reunited him with Australian international teammate Tim Cahill. Carney left Red Bulls on 25 November 2013, after they declined to take up the option to extend the contract.

=== Newcastle Jets ===
On 2 February 2014, Carney signed with Newcastle Jets FC in the A-League until the end of the 2013–14 season. Carney signed a new two-year deal with the club in May 2014.

Carney was reportedly sacked by Jets then owner Nathan Tinkler, following a player revolt leading up to, during, and post the Jets 7–0 loss to Adelaide United. While other alleged leaders of the player revolt against then coach Phil Stubbins were released and eventually paid out, Carney was not. Coach Stubbins however refused to play Carney for the remainder of the season. After Tinkler was stripped of the licence, Carney was retained by Jets and will be part of their roster for the 2015–16 season.

In Newcastle's first game of the 2015–16 season, Carney scored his first goal for the Jets with a 30th-minute header in a 2–1 away win over Wellington Phoenix.

=== Return to Sydney FC ===
On 2 February 2016, about seven hours before the transfer window in Australia ended, it was announced that Newcastle Jets had agreed to release Carney by mutual consent. The next day, it was announced that Sydney FC had signed Carney on an 18-month deal.

In the 2016–17 season, Carney scored a controversial brace in a 2–1 Big Blue win against Melbourne Victory. Replays of his first goal – which put the scores level at 1–1 – suggests that the ball had been controlled by his upper arm. However, referee Chris Beath believed his arms to be in a natural position.

Carney played in the 2017 A-League grand final, coming on as a substitute in the second half. He scored in the penalty shoot-out to help Sydney FC win against Melbourne Victory.

On 13 June 2017, Carney signed a one-year extension, bringing him to the end of the 2017–18 season. At the end of the season he departed Sydney FC to move on to the next stage of his career.

== International career ==
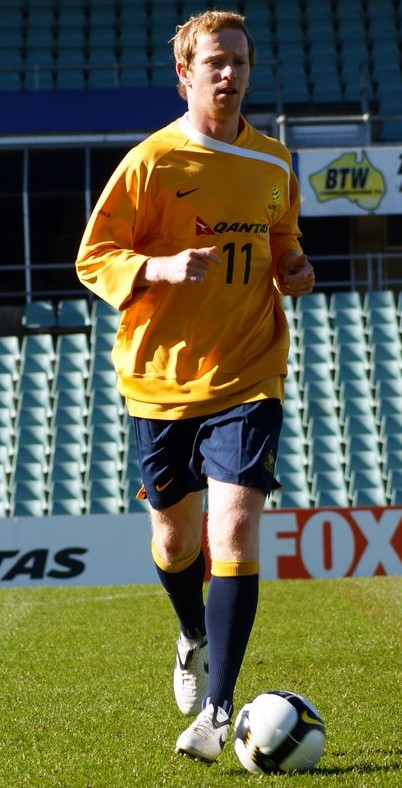
Carney training for Australia

Carney made the Australian squad for the trip to Bahrain in February 2006 to play in the Socceroos first ever match in Asia, and made his full début as a second-half substitute. He played in his second full international against Kuwait in Sydney, Australia in August 2006. He played a full game in the Socceroos 3–0 win over Qatar in their first 2010 World Cup qualifier on 6 February 2008.

Carney chose to play for Australia in the 2008 Summer Olympics, rather than staying in the UK to concentrate on the forthcoming season with Sheffield United.

=== 2007 Asian Cup ===
During the Asian Cup championship, Carney was selected to play in the starting line-up for Australia against co-host nation Thailand in the final game of the group matches. Australia won 4–0 and advanced to the quarter finals of the competition, where they faced Japan. Carney played from start to finish in the Asian Cup quarter final, a match that ended 1–1 after 90 minutes, and remained the same score after 30 minutes of extra time. Japan won 4–3 after penalties were taken to break the deadlock with Carney striking Australia's third and final penalty goal. During the Asian Cup, Carney was played at left full back, impressing in both matches. He subsequently played in left back in Australia's 1–0 defeat against Argentina in September 2007. In his next international, against Nigeria in November 2007, Carney scored from 30 yards to give the Socceroos a 1–0 win.

In June 2009, Carney was an impressive figure in the team that beat Bahrain to secure qualification to the World Cup Finals in 2010. He scored the second goal in their 2–0 victory in Sydney and was then rested for the final group game against Japan in Melbourne the following week due to being on a yellow card.

On 12 August 2009, Carney played in the Australian side that comprehensively beat the Republic of Ireland 3–0 in Limerick. Carney scored the third goal of the game with a stunning 35-yard drive into the top corner.

=== 2010 FIFA World Cup ===
Carney was selected in the 23-man squad to play at the FIFA 2010 World Cup in South Africa for the Socceroos. Carney appeared in the World Cup playing in their Group match against Ghana in which they drew 1–1 and their 2–1 victory against Serbia.

=== 2011 Asian Cup ===
Carney started for Australia in the left-back position for the 2011 Asian Cup in Qatar. In the final against Japan, an error made by Carney in extra-time allowed Japanese player Tadanari Lee to volley the winning goal.

Carney scored his sixth International goal for Australia in their 2–1 victory against Germany in Monchengladbach on Tuesday 29 March.

=== Player of the season ===
Australian magazine FourFourTwo named Carney as the Socceroos Player of the Season for 2007–08 ahead of established Premiership players Tim Cahill, Harry Kewell, Lucas Neill and Mark Viduka.

== Managerial career ==
In 2023 season, Carney was appointed as head coach for NPL NSW side Wollongong Wolves FC.

== Career statistics ==
=== Club ===
Appearances and goals by club, season and competition
Club	Season	League			Cup		Continental		Other		Total	
Club	Season	Division	Apps	Goals	Apps	Goals	Apps	Goals	Apps	Goals	Apps	Goals
Oldham Athletic	2003–04	Second Division	0	0	1	0	–		–		1	0
Halifax Town	2003–04	Football Conference	3	0	–		–		–		3	0
Hamilton Academical	2004–05	Scottish First Division	8	0	1	0	–		–		9	0
Sydney FC	2004–05	A-League	–		–		5	1	3	2	8	3
Sydney FC	2005–06	A-League	24	6	–		–		6	1	30	7
Sydney FC	2006–07	A-League	14	1	–		5	1	5	1	24	3
Sydney FC	Total		38	7	0	0	10	2	14	4	62	13
Sheffield United	2007–08	Championship	21	2	5	1	–		–		26	3
Sheffield United	2008–09	Championship	0	0	1	0	–		–		1	0
Sheffield United	Total		21	2	6	1	0	0	0	0	27	3
Norwich City (loan)	2008–09	Championship	9	0	0	0	–		–		9	0
Twente	2009–10	Eredivisie	8	0	2	0	3	0	–		13	0
Twente	2010–11	Eredivisie	3	0	1	0	0	0	–		4	0
Twente	Total		11	0	3	0	3	0	0	0	17	0
Blackpool	2010–11	Premier League	11	0	0	0	–		–		11	0
Alcorcón	2011–12	Segunda División	3	0	2	0	–		–		5	0
Bunyodkor	2012	Uzbek League	4	1	3	0	5	0	–		12	1
New York Red Bulls	2013	MLS	9	0	2	0	–		–		11	0
Newcastle Jets	2013–14	A-League	7	0	–		–		–		7	0
Newcastle Jets	2014–15	A-League	15	0	0	0	–		–		15	0
Newcastle Jets	2015–16	A-League	15	3	1	1	–		–		16	1
Newcastle Jets	Total		37	3	1	1	0	0	0	0	38	4
Sydney FC	2015–16	A-League	8	2	–		5	1	0	0	13	3
Sydney FC	2016–17	A-League	22	3	5	2	–		–		27	5
Sydney FC	2017–18	A-League	26	4	5	2	4	0	–		35	6
Sydney FC	Total		94	16	10	4	19	3	14	4	137	27
Career total			210	22	29	6	27	3	14	4	280	35

=== International ===
Appearances and goals by national team and year
National team	Year	Apps	Goals
Australia	2006	2	0
Australia	2007	4	1
Australia	2008	11	0
Australia	2009	6	2
Australia	2010	9	1
Australia	2011	7	2
Australia	2012	7	0
Australia	2013	2	0
Total		48	6

Scores and results list Australia's goal tally first, score column indicates score after each Carney goal.

List of international goals scored by David Carney
No.	Date	Venue	Opponent	Score	Result	Competition	Ref.
1	17 November 2007	Craven Cottage, London, England	Nigeria	1–0	1–0	Friendly	
2	10 June 2009	ANZ Stadium, Sydney, Australia	Bahrain	2–0	2–0	2010 FIFA World Cup qualification	
3	12 August 2009	Thomond Park, Limerick, Ireland	Republic of Ireland	3–0	3–0	Friendly	
4	9 October 2010	Sydney Football Stadium, Sydney, Australia	Paraguay	1–0	1–0	Friendly	
5	26 January 2011	Khalifa International Stadium, Al Rayyan, Qatar	Uzbekistan	3–0	6–0	2011 AFC Asian Cup	
6	29 March 2011	Borussia-Park, Mönchengladbach, Germany	Germany	1–1	2–1	Friendly	

== Honours ==
Australia

- AFC Asian Cup: runner-up 2011

Sydney fc

- A-League Championship: 2006
