= Alejandro Salazar =

American soccer player

Personal information
- Date of birth: February 18, 1984 (age 42)
- Place of birth: Eugene, Oregon, United States
- Height: 1.78 m (5 ft 10 in)
- Position: Midfielder

College career
Years	Team	Apps	(Gls)
2002–2004	Portland Pilots		

Senior career*
Years	Team	Apps	(Gls)
2003–2004	Boulder Rapids Reserve	19	(15)
2005–2006	Sydney FC	0	(0)
- * Club domestic league appearances and goals as of 17 February 2009 ‡ National team caps and goals as of 9 February 2007

Alejandro Salazar (born February 18, 1984) is an American former professional soccer player. He played during the 2000s in the United States and Australia.

== Biography ==
Born in Eugene, Oregon, Salazar's father is marathon runner Alberto Salazar.

=== Playing career ===
Salazar played college soccer at the University of Portland from 2002 to 2004, where he was named WCC Freshman of the Year as a freshman, and was the Conference Player of the Year as a sophomore. He left Portland after his junior year to join the newly formed Australian A-league, having registered 64 goals and 42 assists as a Pilot. Salazar didn't have much gaming time for Sydney FC and was released after the 10th round of the season.

Salazar is still remembered in Sydney as a player who was hyped up by the media but did not make an impact at club. His only pre-season appearance in a Sydney FC shirt in Australia being in the second half of a friendly game in 2005. Salazar made his debut coming on as a substitute replacing Steve Corica on the 66th minute in the Semi Final against Adelaide United assisting Mark Rudan's winning goal. Salazar featured in Sydney's campaign to qualify for the Oceania Club Championship, scoring 2 goals in 4 matches. He did get into a small rift with then coach Pierre Littbarski, which soured their relationship. In 2007 Lokomotiv Cove, the unofficial football team of Sydney FC supporters, named their lowest grade team "Team Salazar" in his honour.
