= Matthew Bingley =

Australian soccer player (born 1971)

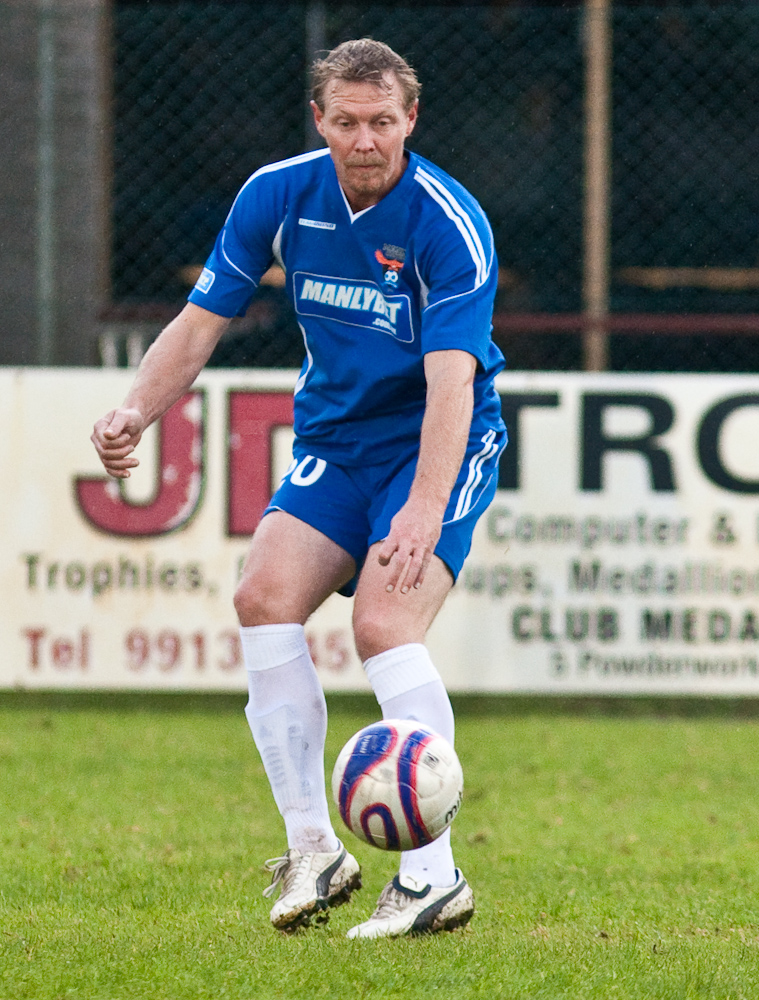
- Bingley in 2009

Personal information
- Full name: Matthew Bingley
- Date of birth: 16 August 1971 (age 55)
- Place of birth: Sydney, Australia
- Height: 1.83 m (6 ft 0 in)
- Positions: Central midfielder; centre back

Youth career
- Granville
- Melita Eagles Merrylands

Senior career*
Years	Team	Apps	(Gls)
1987–1991	St George	67	(16)
1992–1997	Marconi Stallions	117	(19)
1997–1998	Vissel Kobe	24	(2)
1998	JEF United Ichihara	11	(0)
1998–2001	Northern Spirit FC	60	(6)
2001–2003	Newcastle United	55	(2)
2003–2004	Perth Glory	26	(0)
2004	Pahang		
2005–2006	Sydney FC	28	(1)

International career
1993–1997	Australia	14	(5)
Medal record
Representing Australia
Men's Association football
FIFA Confederations Cup
Runner-up	1997 Saudi Arabia
OFC Nations Cup
Winner	1996 Oceania
- * Club domestic league appearances and goals

Matthew Bingley (born 16 August 1971) is an Australian former soccer player. A utility who can play in midfield or defence, he has played over 300 matches in nearly 20 years at the highest level of domestic football in Australia. Bingley also made 14 appearances for the Australian national team, scoring five goals.

== Club career ==
Bingley began playing football with local side Granville before being picked up by state league side Melita Eagles as a junior. He played one match with the Eagles in the New South Wales Division 1 competition at the age of 15 in 1986, and was soon signed by National Soccer League club St. George for 1987. Despite not making an appearance for the Saints during 1987, Bingley made his top-level debut in round 16 of 1988 in a 1–1 draw with the Melbourne Knights. The following season, Bingley's first full year with St. George, he scored 8 goals in 27 appearances to help the team finish 2nd in the premiership. Establishing himself as a regular starting player, he went on to play a further 25 matches in the 1989–90 season, and 12 in 1990–91 before international youth commitments saw him miss part of the season. Upon his return, Bingley played for Granville Chile in the New South Wales 2nd Division until the end of 1991, and then two matches for St. George in the New South Wales Super League at the start of 1992.

Bingley then signed for the Marconi Stallions, and in his first season with the club, made 24 appearances for two goals as they finished second in the premiership before taking the title with a 1–0 win over West Adelaide in the Grand Final. Several more international appearances at the senior level preceded Bingley becoming a regular with the Stallions, and he made a total of 117 league appearances for the club through to the 1996–97 season, scoring 19 goals. During his time there, Marconi missed the finals series just once, and in 1995–96 finished on top of the ladder before falling to the Melbourne Knights in the Grand Final.

1997 saw Bingley move outside Australia for domestic football for the first time, with Zenith Sports and Event Management engineering his signing with J1 League club Vissel Kobe in Japan. In the 1997 and 1998 season, Bingley became the second-highest paid Australian player worldwide, and made 24 appearances, and scored two goals. Remaining in Japan, he transferred to JEF United Ichihara, also in J1 League. Bingley played 11 matches for JEF United in 1998 before returning home in time for the launch of new Sydney NSL club Northern Spirit FC towards the end of the year.

Bingley was a regular starting player with the Spirit, and made 60 appearances in his three seasons with the club. Poor finishing positions for the team in 1999–2000 and 2000–01 however, saw Bingley sign with Newcastle United prior to the start of the 2001–02 season. The move initially proved a success for Bingley, as he played in 27 of Newcastle's 29 league matches, and the team finished 2nd on the competition ladder. Losses to Perth Glory and Olympic Sharks, though, saw Newcastle fail to reach the Grand Final. Continuing with the club for 2002–03, Bingley missed just six matches during the season as Newcastle again reached the finals series. The team managed just two wins in the Championship Round, and Bingley signed with eventual Champions Perth Glory for the following season.

Bingley made 26 appearances for Perth in the 2003–04 season, as they topped the Premiership table by six points over Parramatta Power. He played the full 98 minutes in Perth's 1–0 sudden-death extra time win over Parramatta in the Grand Final, securing the last ever NSL Championship. Like many Australian football players at the time, Bingley moved to Malaysia at the closure of the NSL to play with Pahang in the newly formed Malaysian Super League. Despite winning the inaugural premiership, Bingley shortly returned to Australia to captain Central Coast United in the 2004–05 NSWPL.

In mid-2005, Bingley was signed by Pierre Littbarski as part of the Sydney FC squad, who were to compete in the first season of the revamped A-League in Australia. Before the league started, though, Bingley had already made a significant contribution to the club's history by scoring the opening goal in Sydney's 2–0 victory over AS Magenta in the final of the 2004–05 Oceania Club Championship. The victory meant that Sydney FC would represent Oceania at the FIFA Club World Championship, to be held in Japan towards the end of 2005. Bingley made 20 appearances for Sydney throughout the league season, as well as playing in the team's 1–0 victory over African champions Al Ahly which secured 5th place overall in the CWC. His single league goal for the club came in Sydney's 3–1 away win over the New Zealand Knights. Despite playing the full match in Sydney's 1–0 Grand Final victory, the impressive form of Ruben Zadkovich (on a short-term contract, upgraded to full-time for 2006–07) and the signing of Alex Brosque from Queensland Roar saw Sydney decide to release Bingley at the end of the 2005–06 season. He began playing in the Newcastle Premier League, before a broken collarbone to Robbie Middleby saw Sydney FC re-sign Bingley on a four-week short-term contract to cover for Middleby. He was also brought back to add experience and steel to the Sydney side

After his short term stint with Sydney Olympic Bingley rejoined four time Northern NSW NBN State League Champions Hamilton Olympic for the 2007 season. Matthew had a stellar season after settling into the position of attacking midfield, which saw him claim the club's golden boot award (seven goals) and named best and fairest. But most importantly, he was the driving force behind the club claiming its 5th premiership and 1st since 2001, beating rivals Edgeworth. This maintained Hamilton Olympic's perfect record once reaching the Grand Final. He has re-signed for the 2008 season.

== International career ==
Bingley has represented Australia at all youth levels, beginning in 1987 when he was selected in the under-16 squad to contest the FIFA U-16 World Championship in Canada. Despite not making an appearance during the tournament, where Australia managed to top their group and reach the quarter-finals, the following year he represented Australia in the schoolboy team. Three years later Bingley was selected in Australia's under-20 squad for the 1991 FIFA World Youth Championship in Portugal. Australia topped their group and eventually finished fourth, losing to the hosts in the semi-finals.

In June 1993, Bingley made his senior national team debut during Italian club team AC Milan's tour of Australia. Bingley played a total of 135 minutes in the 0–2 and 0–1 losses. Later in the year, he secured his third international (and first A-class) cap, playing the second half of Australia's 0–1 loss to South Korea in Seoul in the lead-up to Australia's final 1994 FIFA World Cup qualification play-off with Argentina. It took until late 1995 for Bingley to become a more regular player in the Australian team though, and he played two matches against New Zealand in the 1996 Oceania Nations Cup, followed by two friendly matches against Japan in February 1996. In the second of the Japan matches, played at Lakeside Oval in Melbourne, Bingley scored his first ever international goal just seven minutes after replacing captain Paul Wade, to seal a 3–0 victory for Australia. After playing in the second leg of the 1996 ONC, Bingley added a further two goals to his international tally in two consecutive matches against New Zealand and South Korea in January 1997. A match against Norway provided Bingley's 11th international cap, and he played a further two matches during Australia's 1998 FIFA World Cup qualification attempt. Scoring once in Australia's 5–0 victory over Tahiti, Bingley was recalled to the squad again in October for a friendly, and added his 5th international goal as Australia defeated Tunisia 3–0. His final two matches for Australia came in the 1997 Intercontinental Cup for Nations, coming on as a substitute in both the 0–0 draw against Brazil in the group stages and Australia's 6–0 loss in the tournament final, also against Brazil.

== Career statistics ==
Club performance			League	
Season	Club	League	Apps	Goals
Australia			League	
1989–90	St George Saints	National Soccer League	25	5
1990–91	St George Saints	National Soccer League	12	3
1991–92	St George Saints		2	0
1992–93	Marconi Fairfield	National Soccer League	24	2
1993–94	Marconi Fairfield	National Soccer League	25	4
1994–95	Marconi Fairfield	National Soccer League	14	3
1995–96	Marconi Fairfield	National Soccer League	32	8
1996–97	Marconi Fairfield	National Soccer League	22	2
Japan			League	
1997	Vissel Kobe	J1 League	14	1
1998	Vissel Kobe	J1 League	10	1
1998	JEF United Ichihara	J1 League	11	0
Australia			League	
1998–99	Northern Spirit	National Soccer League	10	1
1999–00	Northern Spirit	National Soccer League	27	5
2000–01	Northern Spirit	National Soccer League	23	0
2001–02	Newcastle United	National Soccer League	27	1
2002–03	Newcastle United	National Soccer League	28	1
2003–04	Perth Glory	National Soccer League	26	0
Malaysia			League	
2004	Pahang	Super League		
Australia			League	
2005–06	Sydney	A-League	17	1
2006–07	Sydney	A-League	8	0
Country	Australia		322	36
Country	Japan		35	2
Country	Malaysia			
Total			357	38

=== International ===
Australia national team
Year	Apps	Goals
1993	1	0
1994	0	0
1995	2	0
1996	3	1
1997	8	4
Total	14	5

Scores and results list Australia's goal tally first, score column indicates score after each Bingley goal.

List of international goals scored by Matthew Bingley
No.	Date	Venue	Opponent	Score	Result	Competition
1	14 February 1996	Lakeside Stadium, Melbourne, Australia	Japan	3–0	3–0	Friendly
2	18 January 1997	Lakeside Stadium, Melbourne, Australia	New Zealand	1–0	1–0	Friendly
3	22 January 1997	Suncorp Stadium, Brisbane, Australia	South Korea	1–0	2–1	Friendly
4	13 June 1997	Parramatta Stadium, Sydney, Australia	Tahiti	5–0	5–0	1998 FIFA World Cup qualification
4	1 October 1997	El Menzah Stadium, Tunis, Tunisia	Tunisia	3–0	3–0	Friendly

== Honours ==
Australia

- FIFA Confederations Cup: runner-up, 1997
- OFC Nations Cup: 1996
