= List of Sydney FC players (1–24 appearances) =

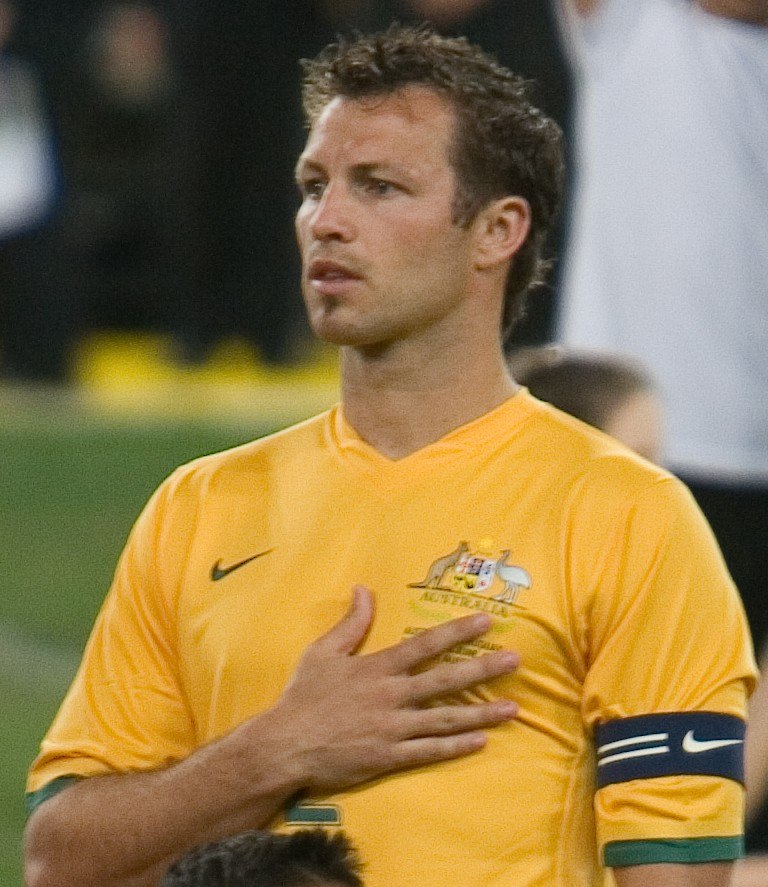
Lucas Neill, former Socceroos captain, made 3 appearances Sydney FC in 2013 before injury cut his season short.

Sydney Football Club, an association football club based in Moore Park, Sydney, was founded in 2004. They became the first member from Sydney admitted into the A-League in 2005. The club's first team have competed in numerous national and international organised competitions, and all players who have played between 1 and 24 such matches are listed below.

Since Sydney FC's first competitive match, more than 130 players have failed to reach 25 appearances for the club. Many of these players spent only a short period of their career at Sydney FC before seeking opportunities in other teams. Lucas Neill made three appearances for the club before his injury cut his season short and had earned 96 full international caps for his country.

== Key ==
- The list is ordered first by date of debut, and then if necessary in alphabetical order.
- Appearances as a substitute are included.
- Statistics are correct up to and including the match played on 13 December 2025. Where a player left the club permanently after this date, his statistics are updated to his date of leaving.

Nationality
Unless otherwise noted, the nationality of a player is determined by the country/countries which he has played for, or if said person has not played international football, their country of birth.
Position
Playing positions are listed according to the tactical formations that were employed at the time.
Club career
Club career is defined as the first and last calendar years in which the player appeared for the club in any of the competitions listed below.
Total appearances and Total goals
Total appearances and goals comprise those in the A-League Men, Australia Cup, AFC Champions League, AFC Champions League Two, A-League Pre-Season Challenge Cup, FIFA Club World Cup, Pan-Pacific Championship and the 2005 Australian Club World Championship Qualifying Tournament.

== Players ==
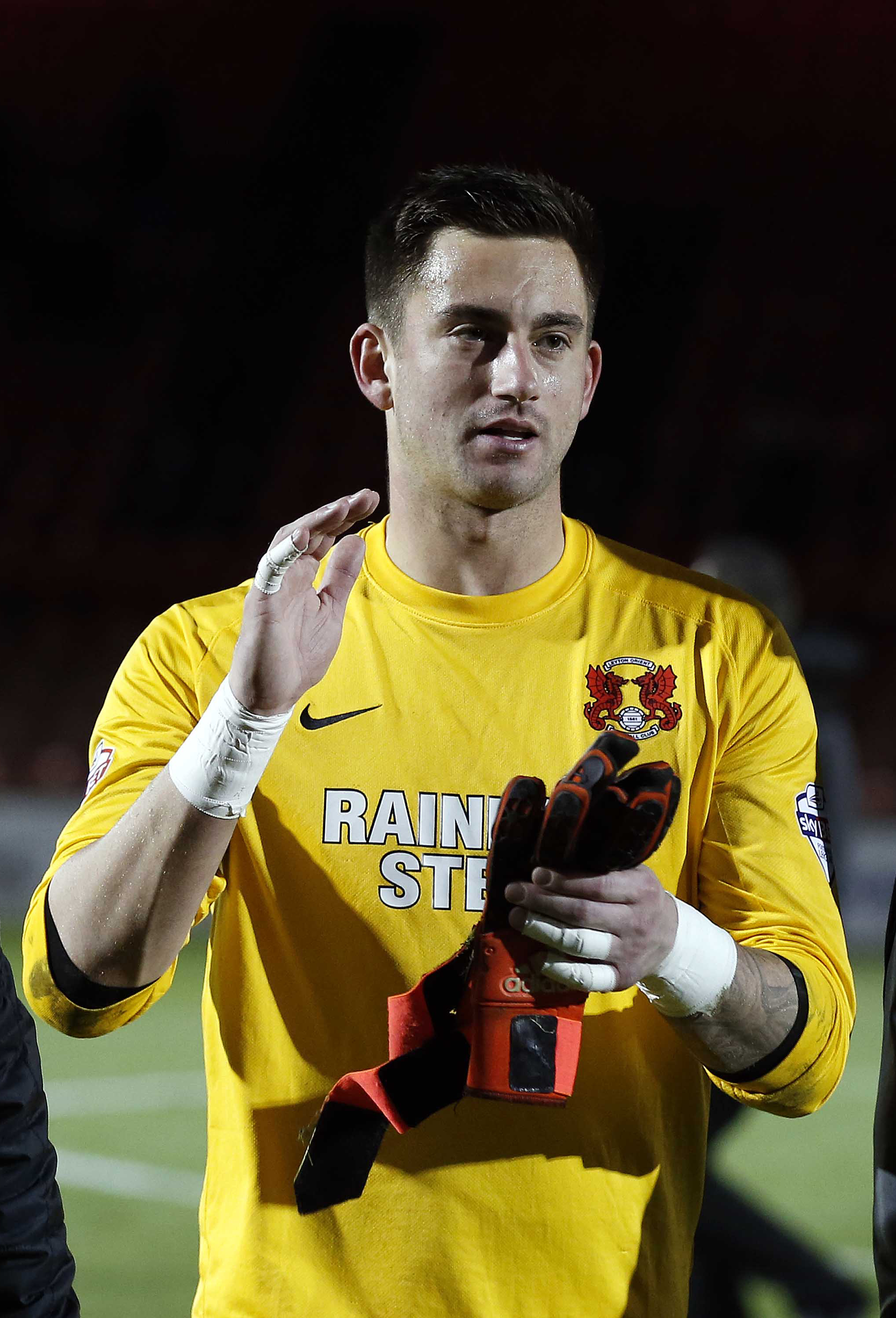
Alex Cisak made his debut for Sydney FC as a substitute in the 2018 FFA Cup.

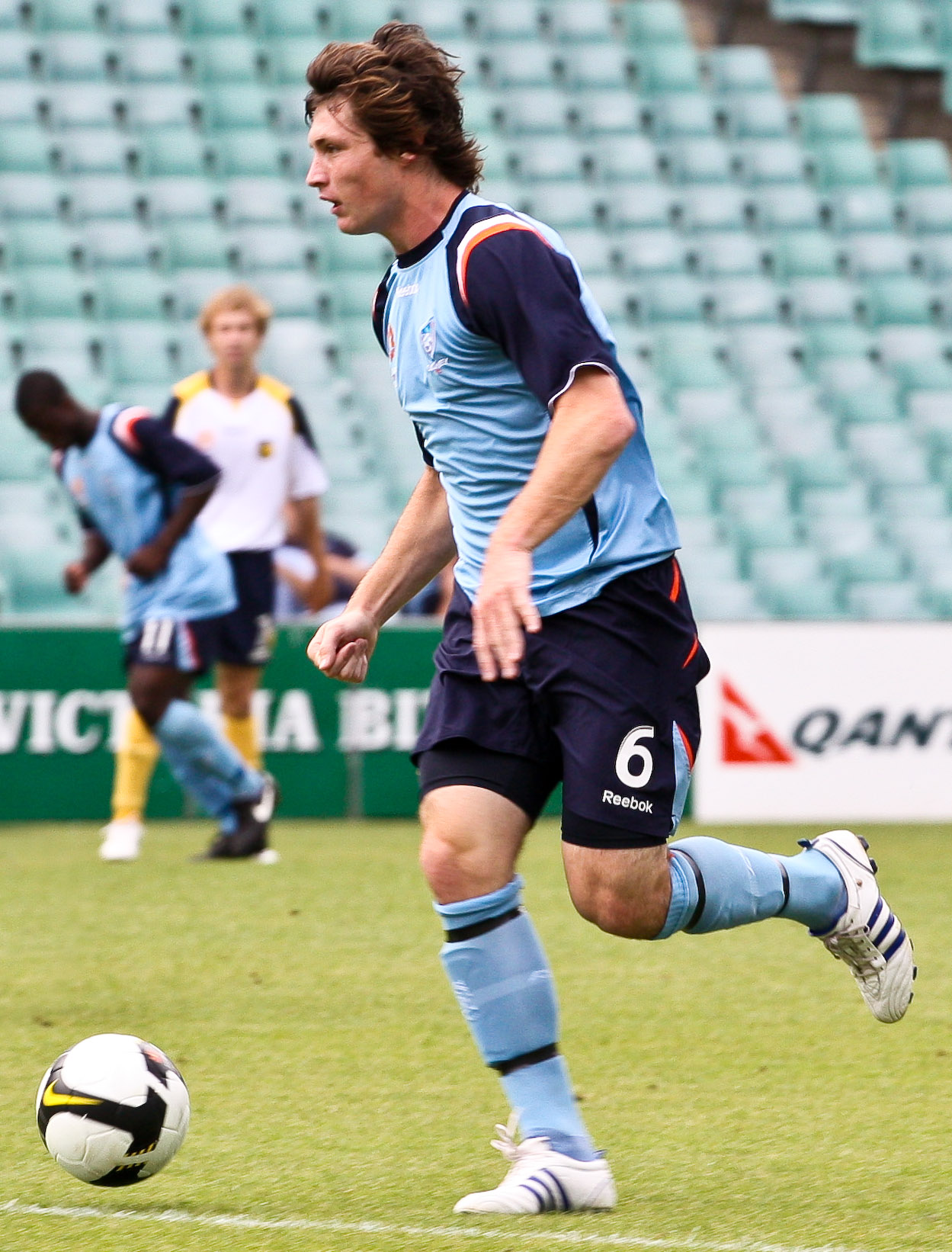
Chris Payne played as a substitute 17 times scoring 4 goals.

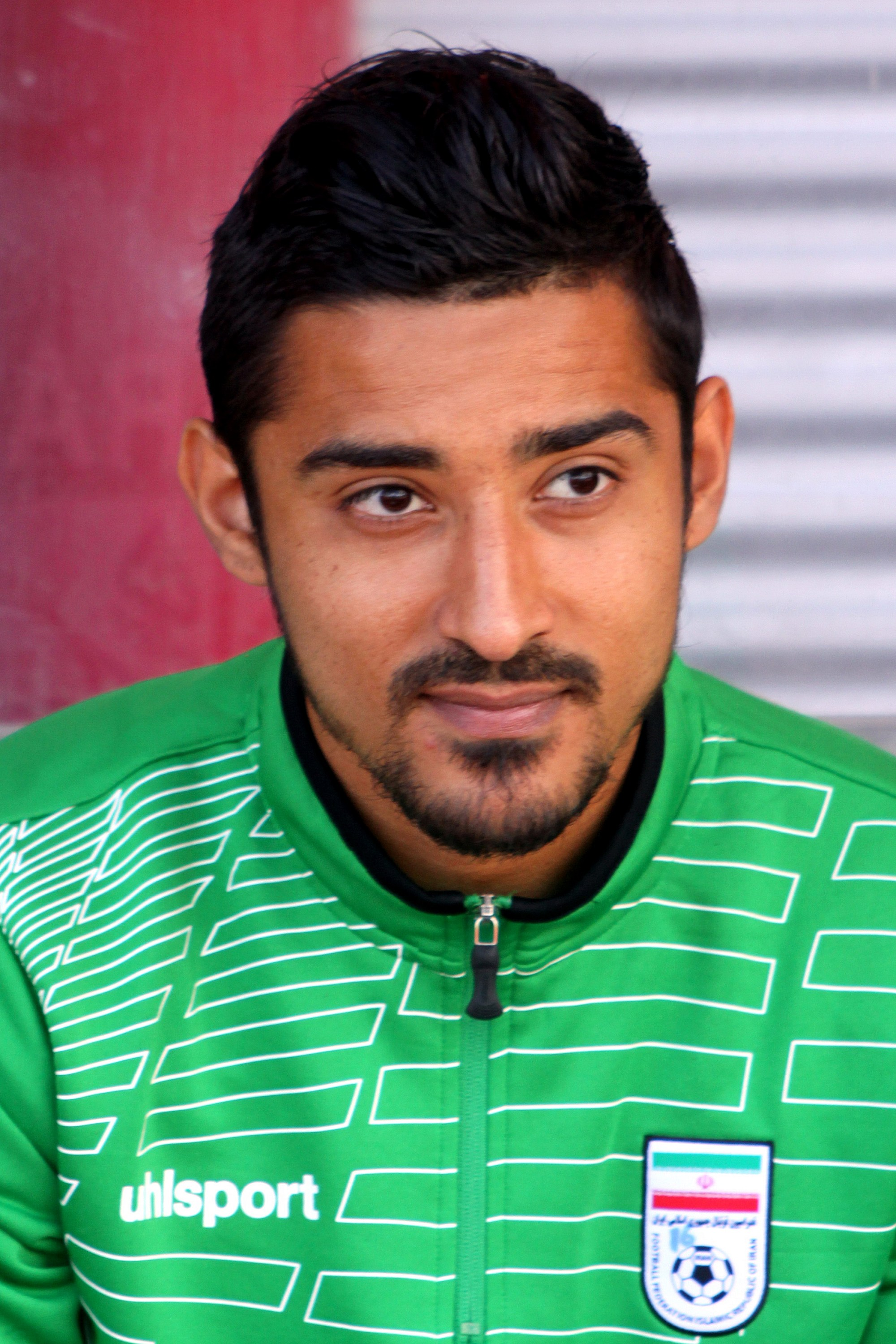
Reza Ghoochannejhad joined Sydney FC in the summer of 2019.

Players highlighted in bold are still actively playing at Sydney FC.

As of 26 April 2026

List of Sydney FC players with between 1 and 24 appearances
Player	Nationality	Pos	Club career	Starts	Subs	Total	Goals
Player	Nationality	Pos	Club career	Appearances			Goals
Justin Pasfield	Australia	GK	2005–2007	1	2	3	0
Todd Brodie	Australia	FW	2005	0	3	3	1
John Buonavoglia	Australia	FW	2005	2	4	6	1
Steve Laurie	Australia	DF	2005–2006	0	2	2	0
Wade Oostendorp	Australia	DF	2005–2006	0	2	2	0
Brendan Renaud	Australia	MF	2007–2008	6	3	9	1
Alejandro Salazar	United States	MF	2005–2006	1	5	6	2
Joe Schirripa	Australia	DF	2005	0	1	1	0
Kazuyoshi Miura	Japan	FW	2005	5	1	6	2
Tolgay Özbey	Australia	FW	2005–2006	0	1	1	0
Jeremy Brockie	New Zealand	FW	2006–2007	3	7	10	0
Steven Bozinovski	Australia	DF	2006–2007	0	1	1	0
Jason Naidovski	Australia	FW	2006	0	1	1	0
Joel Theissen	Australia	MF	2006	0	1	1	0
Nikolas Tsattalios	Australia	DF	2007–2009	7	11	18	0
Benito Carbone	Italy	FW	2006	3	0	3	2
Jonas Salley	Australia	MF	2007	0	1	1	0
Adam Casey	Australia	FW	2007–2010	14	9	23	2
Luka Glavas	Australia	FW	2007	0	2	2	0
Noel Spencer	Australia	MF	2007	0	1	1	0
Ben Vidaic	Australia	FW	2007–2008	2	5	7	0
Matthew Nash	Australia	GK	2007; 2012–2013	0	1	1	0
Cameron Watson	Australia	MF	2007	1	0	1	0
Michael Enfield	United States	MF	2007–2009	3	1	4	0
Daniel Severino	Australia	MF	2007	1	0	1	0
Robert Cattanach	Australia	FW	2007–2008	0	1	1	0
Adam Biddle	Australia	FW	2006–2008	5	15	20	1
Juninho	Brazil	MF	2007–2008	11	4	15	0
Patrick	Brazil	FW	2007–2008	4	6	10	2
Michael Bridges	England	FW	2007–2008	8	1	9	2
Mark Robertson	Australia	MF	2007–2008	3	2	5	0
Ryan Walsh	Australia	DF	2008	2	2	4	0
Chris Payne	Australia	FW	2008–2010	4	17	21	4
Mitchell Prentice	Australia	MF	2008–2010	9	2	11	1
Dez Giraldi	Australia	FW	2008	2	3	5	0
Robbie Mileski	Australia	FW	2008–2009	0	1	1	0
Bobby Petta	Netherlands	FW	2008	3	6	9	0
Beau Busch	Australia	DF	2008–2009	10	0	10	0
Antony Golec	Australia	DF	2008–2011	5	5	10	0
Zachary Cairncross	Australia	DF	2009–2011	2	0	2	0
Iain Ramsay	Philippines	MF	2010	0	1	1	0
Joey Gibbs	Australia	FW	2010	0	1	1	0
Juho Mäkelä	Finland	FW	2011–2012	2	14	16	3
Andrew Durante	New Zealand	DF	2011	3	2	5	0
David Williams	Australia	FW	2011	3	1	4	0
Nathan Sherlock	Australia	DF	2011–2013	2	6	8	0
Jamie Coyne	Australia	DF	2011–2012	14	1	15	1
Mitchell Mallia	Australia	FW	2011–2014	6	11	17	1
Fabinho	Brazil	DF	2012–2013	17	1	18	0
Adam Griffiths	Australia	MF	2012–2013	16	2	18	0
Krunoslav Lovrek	Croatia	FW	2012–2013	5	0	5	0
Trent McClenahan	Australia	MF	2012–2013	8	4	12	0
Blake Powell	Australia	FW	2012–2014	9	9	18	3
Paul Reid	Australia	MF	2012	6	5	11	0
Daniel Petkovski	Australia	DF	2012–2014	2	3	5	0
Hagi Gligor	Australia	MF	2012–2015	13	7	20	0
Jason Culina	Australia	MF	2012–2013	6	2	8	2
Alec Urosevski	Australia	FW	2012–2014	2	8	10	0
Joel Griffiths	Australia	FW	2013	8	0	8	3
Tiago	Brazil	DF	2013–2014	12	0	12	0
Lucas Neill	Australia	DF	2013	3	0	3	0
Pedj Bojić	Australia	DF	2013–2015	19	4	23	0
Richard Garcia	Australia	FW	2013–2014	20	3	23	6
Matt Thompson	Australia	DF	2013–2014	11	7	18	1
Marc Warren	Australia	DF	2013–2014	8	0	8	0
Ranko Despotović	Australia	FW	2013–2014	14	3	17	6
Corey Gameiro	Australia	FW	2013–2015	15	8	23	5
Dylan Caton	Australia	MF	2014	1	1	2	0
Themba Muata-Marlow	Australia	DF	2014–2015	1	0	1	0
Sasa Ognenovski	Australia	DF	2014–2015	17	0	17	2
Robert Stambolziev	Australia	FW	2015–2016	4	20	24	2
Andrew Hoole	Australia	FW	2015–2016	12	11	23	0
Riley Woodcock	Australia	DF	2015–2016; 2016–2017	7	0	7	0
Zac Anderson	Australia	DF	2015–2016	9	0	9	0
Alex Mullen	Australia	MF	2015–2016	1	2	3	0
Bai Antoniou	Australia	FW	2016–2017	0	1	1	0
Nicola Kuleski	North Macedonia	MF	2017	0	2	2	0
Charles Lokolingoy	Australia	FW	2017–2019	0	21	21	0
Patrick Flottmann	Australia	DF	2017–2018; 2019–2021	3	4	7	0
Chris Zuvela	Australia	FW	2017–2022	5	13	18	0
John Iredale	Australia	FW	2017	0	1	1	0
Alex Cisak	Australia	GK	2017–2019	0	1	1	0
Anthony Kalik	Australia	DF	2017–2018	1	6	7	0
Fábio Ferreira	Portugal	FW	2018	0	5	5	0
Cameron Devlin	Australia	MF	2018–2019	1	8	9	1
Jop van der Linden	Netherlands	DF	2018–2019	12	1	13	0
Siem de Jong	Netherlands	MF	2018–2019	16	5	21	6
Jacob Tratt	Australia	DF	2015–2016; 2018–2019	5	6	11	2
Mitch Austin	Australia	FW	2019	0	4	4	0
Reza Ghoochannejhad	Iran	FW	2019	11	6	17	1
Tom Heward-Belle	Australia	GK	2019–2023	17	1	18	0
Liam McGing	Australia	DF	2019; 2021–2022	3	1	4	0
Patrick Scibilio	Australia	DF	2019–	1	0	1	0
Jerry Skotadis	Australia	MF	2019	0	1	1	0
Marco Tilio	Australia	FW	2019–	0	6	6	1
Ryan Teague	Australia	MF	2019–2020	0	1	1	0
Jordi Swibel	Australia	FW	2020–2021	0	13	13	0
Calem Nieuwenhof	Australia	MF	2020–2022	9	8	17	1
Adam Pavlesic	Australia	GK	2020–2024	4	1	5	0
Elvis Kamsoba	Burundi	FW	2021–2022	18	6	24	5
Connor O'Toole	Australia	DF	2022–2023	12	9	21	0
Mustafa Amini	Australia	MF	2022	12	12	24	1
Luciano Narsingh	Netherlands	FW	2022	6	8	14	1
Luka Smyth	Australia	FW	2022	0	2	2	0
Oscar Priestman	Australia	FW	2022	0	2	2	0
Alex Parsons	Australia	FW	2022–2023	0	8	8	1
Adrian Vlastelica	Australia	DF	2022–2023	2	0	2	0
Kealey Adamson	Australia	DF	2023	4	1	5	0
**Zac De Jesus**	Australia	DF	2023–	14	10	24	0
Nathan Amanatidis	Australia	MF	2023–2025	2	17	19	1
**Mitch Glasson**	Australia	FW	2023–	0	20	20	0
Matthew Scarcella	Australia	MF	2023–2025	0	8	8	0
**Nick Alfaro**	Australia	MF	2024–	0	3	3	0
**Marin France**	Australia	MF	2024–	1	3	4	0
Will Kennedy	Australia	DF	2024–2025	0	6	6	0
**Lachie Middleton**	Australia	MF	2024–	1	0	1	0
**Tyler Williams**	Australia	DF	2024–	0	1	1	0
**Mathias Macallister**	Australia	FW	2025–	0	8	8	1
Kyle Shaw	Australia	DF	2025	3	1	4	0
Jaushua Sotirio	New Caledonia	FW	2025	0	2	2	0
**Akol Akon**	Australia	FW	2025–	3	10	13	0
**Gus Hoefsloot**	Australia	GK	2023–	3	0	3	0
**Al Hassan Toure**	Australia	FW	2025–	15	7	22	6
**Rhys Youlley**	Australia	MF	2025–	16	6	22	1
**Joe Lacey**	Wales	MF	2023–	0	2	2	0
**Marcel Tisserand**	DR Congo	DF	2025–	18	1	19	2
**Víctor Campuzano**	Spain	FW	2025–	20	4	24	4
**Abel Walatee**	Australia	FW	2025–	3	11	14	1
**Ben Garuccio**	Australia	DF	2025–	19	1	20	12
**Apostolos Stamatelopoulos**	Australia	FW	2026–	9	1	10	2
**Ahmet Arslan**	Germany	MF	2025–	10	1	11	1
