= 2007–08 Sydney FC season =

Sydney FC
2007–2008 season
- Chairman: George Perry; Andrew Kemeny
- Manager: Branko Čulina; John Kosmina
- A-League: 3rd (League); Semi-finals (Finals)
- A-League Pre-Season Challenge Cup: 7th
- Pan-Pacific Championship: 4th
- Top goalscorer: League: Alex Brosque (8 goals); All: Alex Brosque (11 goals)
- Highest home attendance: League: 33,458 (20 January 2008, vs Melbourne); All: 80,295 (27 November 2007 vs Los Angeles Galaxy)
- Lowest home attendance: 10,732 (7 December 2007, vs Newcastle Jets)
Home colours	Away colours

The 2007–08 season is Sydney FC's third season of football (soccer) in Australia. The club finished seventh in the A-League Pre-season Challenge Cup and competed in the 2007–08 A-League season.

After a disappointing start to the season, the club sacked coach Branko Čulina in October, and appointed John Kosmina. The team recovered from its poor start to finish third on the league table, securing a place in the finals series but being eliminated in the semi-final by Queensland Roar.

The club represented Australia at the Pan-Pacific Championship in February 2008 and finished fourth after losing to American MLS sides Houston Dynamo and Los Angeles Galaxy.

== Player details ==
=== Squad ===
Players included in a Sydney FC squad in the 2007–08 season: Note: Flags indicate national team as defined under FIFA eligibility rules; some limited exceptions apply. Players may hold more than one non-FIFA nationality.

No.	Pos.	Nation	Player
1	GK	AUS	Clint Bolton
2	DF	AUS	Iain Fyfe
3	DF	AUS	Nikolas Tsattalios
4	DF	AUS	Mark Rudan
5	DF	AUS	Ryan Walsh
6	DF	AUS	Tony Popović (captain)
7	MF	AUS	Robbie Middleby
8	MF	AUS	Ruben Zadkovich
9	FW	AUS	David Zdrilic
10	MF	AUS	Steve Corica
11	FW	AUS	Brendon Santalab
12	FW	BRA	Patrick da Silva
13	FW	AUS	Ben Vidaic
14	FW	AUS	Alex Brosque
15	MF	NIR	Terry McFlynn
16	DF	AUS	Mark Milligan
17	DF	AUS	Jacob Timpano

No.	Pos.	Nation	Player
18	FW	AUS	Adam Casey
19	MF	USA	Michael Enfield
20	GK	AUS	Ivan Necevski
21	MF	AUS	Adam Biddle
22	MF	BRA	Juninho
23	MF	AUS	Ufuk Talay
24	FW	AUS	Robbie Cattanach
25	MF	AUS	Matthew Jurman
25	DF	AUS	Cameron Watson
25	FW	AUS	Daniel Severino
26	MF	AUS	Brendan Renaud
27	MF	AUS	Shannon Cole
28	MF	AUS	Chris Nunes
28	FW	ENG	Michael Bridges
29	MF	AUS	Mark Robertson
30	GK	AUS	Matthew Nash
40	GK	FRA	Michael Herbet

=== Transfers ===
With Branko Culina installed at the helm, he sought to reconstruct the Sydney squad which had been plagued by injuries and financial constraints the previous year. Nikolai Topor-Stanley and Noel Spencer left for other A-League sides at the end of the Asian Champions League, but defender Nikolas Tsattalios was rewarded with a longer term contract. New signings from foreign leagues were unveiled in American Michael Enfield, Brendon Santalab and World Cup Socceroo Tony Popović. Popović's expected role in the club was further reinforced by being handed the captaincy for the A-League season. The club also fulfilled their youth player quota, signing Joey striker Ben Vidaic and winger Adam Biddle.

The club also sought to find a new marquee player as they had been unable to land a household-name since the departure of Dwight Yorke at the start of the previous season. The club unsuccessfully courted a number of high-profile internationals including Philip Cocu, Robbie Fowler, Hakan Şükür, Christian Vieri, Jay-Jay Okocha and John Aloisi. On 3 August 2007 Sydney announced, (two days after media reports broke the story) that Brazilian international Juninho Paulista will be their marquee player on a one-year deal. This came the same time as David Carney agreed to move to English side Sheffield United following speculation of his departure following the 2007 AFC Asian Cup. Sydney finalised their squad by signing a second Brazilian in striker Patrick da Silva.

With the season kicking off, new reserve goalkeeper Ivan Necevski suffered an injury in training expected to keep him out of action for up to two months. APIA Leichhardt custodian Matthew Nash impressed in his preseason trial to earn a short-term contract as cover. As first round matches were underway with Nash on the bench, Sydney agreed terms with veteran John Filan to join the club, having recently returned home after retiring at Wigan. The short-term agreement fell through less than a week later, Filan citing outside issues.

==== In ====
Player	From	League	Fee	Date
(United States) Michael Enfield	Los Angeles Galaxy	(United States) Major League Soccer	Free	7 April 2007
(Australia) Brendon Santalab	Újpest FC	(Hungary) Borsodi Liga	Free	22 June 2007
(Australia) Ivan Necevski	Blacktown City Demons	(Australia) NSW Premier League	Free	22 June 2007
(Australia) Nikolas Tsattalios	Sydney FC (promoted from short-term deal)	(Australia) A-League	–	2 July 2007
(Australia) Tony Popović	Al-Arabi	(Qatar) Qatari League	Free	11 July 2007
(Australia) Ben Vidaic	Sydney United	(Australia) NSW Premier League	Free	31 July 2007
(Brazil) Juninho Paulista	Flamengo (free agent)	(Brazil) Brazilian Série A	–	3 August 2007
(Australia) Adam Biddle	Blacktown City Demons	(Australia) NSW Premier League	Free	6 August 2007
(Brazil) Patrick da Silva	Nacional Atlético Clube (SP)	(Brazil) Campeonato Paulista Série A2	Free	18 August 2007
(Australia) Brendan Renaud	Blacktown City Demons	(Australia) NSW Premier League	Free	12 December 2007

==== Out ====
Player	To	League	Fee	Date
(Australia) Nikolai Topor-Stanley	Perth Glory	(Australia) A-League	–	24 May 2007 .
(Australia) Justin Pasfield	Sydney United (released)	(Australia) NSW Premier League	–	24 May 2007
(Australia) Noel Spencer	Newcastle United Jets	(Australia) A-League	–	24 May 2007
(Australia) Luka Glavas	Heidelberg United (released)	(Australia) Victorian Premier League	–	24 May 2007
(Australia) Dean Bouzanis	Liverpool F.C. (loan terminated – delisted)	(England) Premier League	–	June 2007
(Australia) David Carney	Sheffield United	(England) Premier League	A$125,000	4 August 2007
(Australia) Mark Rudan	Avispa Fukuoka	(Japan) J. League Div 2	A$100,000	17 December 2007
(Australia) Brendan Renaud	Retired	–	–	23 February 2008

==== Short-term signings ====
Player	From	Start date	End date	Reason
(Australia) Matthew Nash	(Australia) APIA Leichhardt	23 August 2007	10 October 2007	Injury cover for Ivan Necevski
(Australia) Matthew Nash	(Australia) APIA Leichhardt	21 December 2007	24 December 2007	Injury cover for Clint Bolton
(France) Michael Herbet	(Australia) Waverley Old Boys	6 September 2007	12 September 2007	Cover for Clint Bolton while on international duty
(Australia) Matthew Jurman	(Australia) AIS	6 September 2007	12 September 2007	Cover for Mark Milligan/Ruben Zadkovich while on international duty
(Australia) Robbie Cattanach	(Australia) Manly United FC	6 September 2007	12 September 2007	Cover for Alex Brosque while on international duty
(England) Michael Bridges	(England) Hull City (loan)	17 October 2007	21 January 2008	Injury cover for Michael Enfield
(Australia) Mark Robertson	(Hungary) FC Sopron	13 December 2007	24 February 2008	Injury cover for Adam Casey
(Australia) Ryan Walsh	(Australia) Blacktown City Demons	20 February 2008	24 February 2008	Injury cover for Robbie Middleby at Pan-Pacific Championship

== Pre-season ==
=== AFC Champions League ===
As 2005–06 A-League Champions, Sydney qualified for the 2007 AFC Champions League as one of the two teams representing Australia along with 2005–06 League Premiers, Adelaide United. Group matches were played from March to May 2007, during the A-League off-season. Sydney finished second in their group after two wins, three draws and one loss, a point behind Urawa Reds who progressed to the next stage of competition.

=== Squad preparation ===
For the new season, Sydney have established an agreement with Macquarie University to use the Sport and Aquatic Centre as a training base and also establishing an off-field relationship offering educational, corporate and research linkages. As part of preparations, the club staged a training camp on the Sunshine Coast with a match against a team of local players in the lead up to their opening Pre-season Cup match. Sydney will also play a series of friendly matches against NSW Premier League and State League sides, to engage with the Sydney football community. These friendlies and Pre-season Cup matches also provided experience for trialling players Ben Vidaic, Cameron Watson, Daniel Severino, Robbie Cattanach, Shannon Cole, Chris Nunes, former short-term Sydney player Tolgay Özbey and goalkeepers Vendram Janjetovic and Matthew Nash.

==== Friendly matches ====
11 July 2007	Sunshine Coast Select XI	1–2	Sydney FC	Sunshine Coast
	Tyson Holmes	Report	Ufuk Talay	Stadium: Maroochydore Regional Football Complex

18 July 2007	Sydney Uni SFC	0–3	Sydney FC	Sydney
		Report	David Zdrilic 25'; Marko Rudan 44'; Ben Vidaic 80'	Stadium: Valentine Sports Park

8 August 2007	Manly United	2–3	Sydney FC	Sydney
	Andrew Mailer 20'; Brad Groves 77'	Report	Adam Biddle 15'; Michael Enfield 40'; Ufuk Talay 75'	Stadium: Cromer Park

17 August 2007	Penrith Nepean United	2–1	Sydney FC	Sydney
	Mitchell Long 44'; Ben Gough (approx. 75)	Report	Mark Milligan 27'	Stadium: CUA Stadium; Attendance: 5,000

27 November 2007 Hyundai Club Challenge	Sydney FC (Australia)	5–3	(United States) Los Angeles Galaxy	Sydney
	Brosque 5', 25'; Zadkovich 29'; Middleby 53'; Fyfe 87'	Report	Beckham 45'; Buddle 49'; Donovan 90'	Stadium: Telstra Stadium; Attendance: 80,295; Referee: Mark Shield

== 2007 A-League Pre-season Cup ==
The Pre-season Cup competition consists of two groups of four teams, each team to play each other once. All teams then progress to a playoff stage with opponents based on group position, followed by finals series to determine the cup winner. Sydney finished the group stage bottom of Group B behind Central Coast Mariners, Queensland Roar and Wellington Phoenix. After a loss and a win in the final placings matches, they were ranked seventh.

=== Group stage ===
Pos	Team	Pld	W	D	L	GF	GA	GD	BP	Pts
1	Central Coast Mariners	3	2	1	0	6	1	+5	3	10
2	Queensland Roar	3	1	2	0	3	2	+1	1	6
3	Wellington Phoenix	3	1	0	2	4	4	0	2	5
4	Sydney FC	3	0	1	2	0	6	−6	0	1

14 July 2007 1	Queensland Roar	0–0	Sydney FC	Sunshine Coast
19:00 AEST		Report		Stadium: Maroochydore Regional Football Complex; Attendance: 4,892; Referee: Chris Beath

22 July 2007 2	Wellington Phoenix	3–0	Sydney FC	Wellington
14:00 NZST	Shane Smeltz 13', 89'; Marko Rudan 14' (o.g.)	Report		Stadium: Westpac Stadium; Attendance: 6,039; Referee: Peter O'Leary

29 July 2007 3	Sydney FC	0–3	Central Coast Mariners	Canberra
15:00 AEST		Report	Matthew Osman 36'; Adam Kwasnik 44'; Andre Gumprecht 51'	Stadium: Canberra Stadium; Attendance: 5,735; Referee: Ben Williams

=== Playoffs ===
4 August 2007	Sydney FC	2–3	Newcastle Jets	Sydney
19:30 AEST	Ruben Zadkovich 79'	Report	Joel Griffiths 5', 76'	Stadium: Parramatta Stadium; Attendance: 2,611; Referee: Peter Green

11 August 2007 Seventh place play-off	Melbourne Victory	0–1	Sydney FC	Melbourne
19:30 AEST		Report	Alex Brosque 34'	Stadium: Olympic Park; Attendance: 3,400; Referee: Simon Przydacz

== 2007–08 A-League ==
On 5 August, David Carney was transferred for A$125,000 to English Championship side, Sheffield United. The former Sydney player signed a three-year deal with the club which has been reported to earn him around A$1.25 million a year.

New players including former Socceroos regular Tony Popovic and former LA Galaxy Attacking Midfielder, Michael Enfield have signed with Sydney for the upcoming season. On 3 August 2007 Brazilian international Juninho Paulista, formerly of Celtic and Middlesbrough, signed with Sydney FC as their marquee player. Sydney have also announced the signings of youth players Ben Vidaic and Adam Biddle.

Former Socceroos Tony Popovic has been named the new skipper alongside current Socceroos Mark Milligan as vice-captain for the coming 2007–08 season.

On 15 October 2007 Michael Bridges was signed on a loan with Sydney FC, until the end of the 2007–08 season of the Hyundai A-League as a replacement for long-term casualty Michael Enfield, who has been ruled out for several months after sustaining a serious knee injury.

On 22 October 2007, it was announced that Branko Culina would be sacked from the club following disappointing results. It was announced on 23 October, that former Adelaide United coach John Kosmina will take the role as the new head coach of Sydney FC.

Kosmina got the side of to a flying start under his tenure, his first match in charge, a clash with then table-topping rivals Central Coast, a thrilling 3–2 victory in front of a crowd of nearly 18,000 at the SFS, a sign of bigger things to come for the Blues. This was followed by an impressive 1–0 away victory over Newcastle Jets; with former England junior Michael Bridges recording his first goal for Sydney FC. An entertaining 0–0 draw at the Telstra Dome, with rivals Melbourne, followed, with Sydney FC still undefeated under Kosmina.

Sydney FC suffered their first loss under John Kosmina on 15 December losing 4–2 to bottom side Perth Glory. Sydney goals were scored by Steve Corica and Michael Bridges.

On 22 December, a crucial match against the Central Coast Mariners resulted in a 5–4 victory in favour of Sydney. The match, held at Bluetongue Central Coast Stadium, was described by critics as the best game ever to come from the A-League. The crucial win moved Sydney FC up by 3 points to 4th place on the ladder, overtaking Adelaide United. The win was especially savoured after Sydney were down 2–0 after 15 minutes. The controversial sending-off of Mariners goalkeeper Danny Vukovic in the 16th minute turned the match in favour of Sydney, who scored their 5th goal via an Ufuk Taly penalty with the final kick of the match in stoppage time.

On Friday 28 December 2007, Sydney FC came from behind for the second time in two weeks to defeat a 10-man Adelaide United 3–1 and keep its unbeaten away record intact in front of a record crowd of 25,039 in Adelaide. This result forced Adelaide down to 5th on the ladder. With 3rd place Newcastle Jets unable to secure a victory over Wellington Phoenix in Round 18, Sydney leap-frogged the Jets into 3rd place, with only 3 points behind the tied leaders.

A week later Sydney travelled across the Tasman to face Wellington Phoenix at Westpac Stadium. Sydney came out of this match once again victorious winning 2–0 with goals from Northern Ireland superstar Terry McFlynn and current leading goalscorer for Sydney, Alex Brosque. This kept them in 3rd position on the A-League ladder and in good contention for a finals berth. This win also ensured that the Phoenix would not reach the finals.

As of 30 December 2007 rumours suggesting that Sydney had signed Simon Colosimo from the Perth Glory and Newcastle Jets striker Mark Bridge for the 2008/09 Season. Although these rumours have been proved true, no statements have officially been released as neither player wanted to cause trouble at their present clubs.

On Sunday 13 January 2008 Sydney flew up to Brisbane to play the Queensland Roar at Suncorp Stadium. The game finished 0–0, with both sides taking a point. Sydney only needed a draw to secure their place for a 3rd consecutive finals appearance. The draw means that the top 4 teams (Sydney, Queensland Roar, Central Coast Mariners, Newcastle Jets) are all on 31 points each, although Queensland are on top due to goal difference. Both teams had excellent chances to open the scoring for their club, but good keeping and failure to capitalise on good opportunities meant that many goals went begging. In the end the 32,000 strong crowd at Suncorp Stadium went home feeling disappointed that they didn't get their money's worth for this State of Origin Match.

The final game of the regular season saw Sydney's largest crowd of the season, it drew a large crowd of 33,458 people. Sydney needed to win by at least 2 goals, and they got off to a flying start, with Steve Corica scoring in the 3rd minute. For the rest of the half Melbourne looked shellshocked, and never really recovered from to shock early goal. But they hit back 25 seconds after the break, with Sydney's minds still back in the dressing room, Melbourne midfielder Nick Ward flew down the right wing and took a shot, which ended up rebounding into Sydney defender Mark Milligan, ending up as an own goal. With 15 minutes left in the game Alex Brosque scored, making the score 2–1. But 5 Minutes later Danny Allsopp scored for Melbourne, leaving the final score 2–2. Sydney failed to claim the minor premiership which ended up going to the Central Coast Mariners with their 2–0 victory over the Wellington Phoenix at Gosford. Sydney will now play Queensland Roar in the Semi-Final which is to be held at the Sydney Football Stadium.

On Friday 26 January Sydney played their first leg home final against the Queensland Roar in front of a crowd of 23,450 at the Sydney Football Stadium. The match which was supposed to be played up at Queensland's home ground Suncorp Stadium but it was moved to Sydney because of a concert by the '80s band The Police. Recent matches against the Roar, had all been mostly uneventful affairs, including a 0–0 draw a couple of weeks beforehand, and it was the same again. Both sides had few chances during the 1st half, but Queensland's Brazilian import Reinaldo missed a golden opportunity when he air-swinged a cross in the opening 10 minutes. Sydney's best chance came in the 2nd half when Alex Brosque made a break, got around defender Andrew Packer and only had to slot the ball past the keeper but ended up booting the ball over the crossbar, and into the disappointed 'cove' supporters. Late in the 2nd half Sydney suffered a blow when midfielder Robbie Middleby was fouled heavily by Roar defender Sasa Ognenovski and injured his hamstring. Middleby is now expected to miss the next leg up in Brisbane, and possibly the Grand Final. Sydney had to chance to get a double late in the game when Brendon Santalab and Patrick missed golden opportunities.

Sydney and Queensland will now play the second leg of the minor semi-final at Suncorp Stadium on 8 February 2008. Two weeks later Sydney were up in Brisbane to face off in the second leg of the preliminary final. They had suffered a knock-back the day before they flew up with Marquee player Juninho ruled out with a knee injury that he picked up in training. Ruben Zadkovich was announced as his replacement. Sydney started the match well but with many poor decisions by referee Mark Shield including the sending off of Midfielder Robbie Middleby for a tackle, which did not even deserve a yellow. Queensland scored in the 14th minute through their Brazilian import Reinaldo and Sydney never looked like coming back after that. Referee Shield made another poor call when Sydney captain Tony Popović allegedly shoved Roar striker Tahj Minniecon in the penalty box, and Sasa Ognenovski converted the penalty past keeper Clint Bolton. Many Sydney fans were disgusted at the poor display shown by referee Mark Shield, as most games refereed under him have turned out to be fair challenges, and as a result the small Sydney group that had travelled across the border booed him off.

=== League table ===
Pos	Team	Pld	W	D	L	GF	GA	GD	Pts	Qualification
1	Central Coast Mariners	21	10	4	7	30	25	+5	34	Qualification for 2009 AFC Champions League group stage and Finals series (Note: First place qualifies for the 2009 AFC Champions League group stage. Winning the 2008 A-League Grand Final earns qualification for the 2009 AFC Champions League group stage, unless the Grand Final winners are also first place, in which case the Grand Final runner up qualifies.)
2	Newcastle Jets (C)	21	9	7	5	25	21	+4	34	Qualification for 2009 AFC Champions League group stage and Finals series
3	Sydney FC	21	8	8	5	28	24	+4	32	Qualification for 2008 Pan-Pacific Championship and Finals series
4	Queensland Roar	21	8	7	6	25	21	+4	31	Qualification for Finals series
5	Melbourne Victory	21	6	9	6	29	29	0	27	
6	Adelaide United	21	6	8	7	31	29	+2	26	
7	Perth Glory	21	4	8	9	27	34	−7	20	
8	Wellington Phoenix (Note: Wellington Phoenix cannot qualify for the AFC Champions League as they are not recognised as an AFC club.)	21	5	5	11	25	37	−12	20	

Source: ultimatealeague.com
Rules for classification: 1) points; 2) goal difference; 3) number of goals scored.
(C) Champions

=== Matches ===
24 August 2007 1	Sydney FC	0–1	Central Coast Mariners	Sydney
20:00 AEST		Report; Summary	Petrovski 7'	Stadium: Sydney Football Stadium; Attendance: 18,457; Referee: Peter Green

1 September 2007 2	Sydney FC	2–2	Adelaide United	Sydney
17:00 AEST	Talay 13'; Brosque 74'	Report; Summary	Alagich 9'; Burns 76'	Stadium: Sydney Football Stadium; Attendance: 14,233; Referee: Mark Shield

9 September 2007 3	Perth Glory	0–0	Sydney FC	Perth
15:00 AWST		Report; Summary		Stadium: Members Equity Stadium; Attendance: 7,907; Referee: Craig Zetter

14 September 2007 4	Sydney FC	1–2	Wellington Phoenix	Sydney
20:00 AEST	Casey 6'	Report; Summary	Felipè 8'; Daniel 29' (pen.)	Stadium: Sydney Football Stadium; Attendance: 11,491; Referee: Matthew Breeze

22 September 2007 5	Queensland Roar	0–1	Sydney FC	Brisbane
19:00 AEST		Report; Summary	Patrick 69'	Stadium: Suncorp Stadium; Attendance: 16,582; Referee: Mark Shield

29 September 2007 6	Sydney FC	1–0	Newcastle Jets	Sydney
19:00 AEST	Brosque 36'	Report; Summary		Stadium: Sydney Football Stadium; Attendance: 13,755; Referee: Craig Zetter

6 October 2007 7	Sydney FC	0–1	Melbourne Victory	Sydney
19:00 AEST		Report; Summary	Allsopp 82'	Stadium: Sydney Football Stadium; Attendance: 18,436; Referee: Mark Shield

12 October 2007 8	Perth Glory	3–3	Sydney FC	Perth
20:00 AWST	Harnwell 53'; Robinson 59'; Prentice 69'	Report; Summary	Brosque 40', 90+3'; Patrick 72'	Stadium: Members Equity Stadium; Attendance: 6,876; Referee: Matthew Breeze

20 October 2007 9	Sydney FC	0–1	Adelaide United	Sydney
19:00 AEST		Report; Summary	Pantelis 53'	Stadium: Sydney Football Stadium; Attendance: 12,922; Referee: Matthew Breeze

28 October 2007 10	Sydney FC	3–2	Central Coast Mariners	Sydney
15:00 AEST	Brosque 16', 26'; Popovic 32'	Report; Summary	Hutchinson 27', 56'	Stadium: Sydney Football Stadium; Attendance: 17,652; Referee: Mark Shield

3 November 2007 11	Newcastle Jets	0–1	Sydney FC	Newcastle
19:00 AEDT		Report; Summary	Bridges 69'	Stadium: EnergyAustralia Stadium; Attendance: 16,433; Referee: Matthew Breeze

10 November 2007 12	Melbourne Victory	0–0	Sydney FC	Melbourne
19:00 AEDT		Report; Summary		Stadium: Telstra Dome; Attendance: 31,884; Referee: Mark Shield

17 November 2007 13	Wellington Phoenix	1–1	Sydney FC	Wellington
19:00 NZST	R.Aloisi 29'	Report; Summary	Talay 90+3' (pen.)	Stadium: Westpac Stadium; Attendance: 8,062; Referee: Peter Green

25 November 2007 14	Sydney FC	0–0	Queensland Roar	Sydney
19:00 AEDT		Report; Summary		Stadium: Sydney Football Stadium; Attendance: 16,569; Referee: Matthew Breeze

7 December 2007 16	Sydney FC	1–0	Newcastle Jets	Sydney
20:00 AEDT	Corica 90+3'	Report; Summary		Stadium: Sydney Football Stadium; Attendance: 10,732; Referee: Matthew Breeze

15 December 2007 17	Sydney FC	2–4	Perth Glory	Sydney
19:00 AEDT	Corica 50'; Bridges 90'	Report; Summary	Celeski 34', 35', 77' (pen.); Bertos 49'	Stadium: Sydney Football Stadium; Attendance: 12,402; Referee: Michael Hester

22 December 2007 15	Central Coast Mariners	4–5	Sydney FC	Gosford
19:00 AEDT	Jedinak 3'; J.Aloisi 16'; Owens 63' (pen.); Kwasnik 86'	Report; Summary	Fyfe 33'; McFlynn 50'; Biddle 71'; Santalab 76'; Talay 90+5' (pen.)	Stadium: Bluetongue Stadium; Attendance: 17,514; Referee: Matthew Breeze
Note: Match postponed due to heavy rain affecting pitch conditions.

28 December 2007 18	Adelaide United	1–3	Sydney FC	Adelaide
19:30 ACST	Sarkies 20'	Report; Summary	Santalab 44'; Corica 54'; Middleby 66'	Stadium: Adelaide Oval; Attendance: 25,039; Referee: Matthew Breeze

4 January 2008 19	Wellington Phoenix	0–2	Sydney FC	Wellington
19:30 NZST		Report; Summary	McFlynn 79'; Brosque 83'	Stadium: Westpac Stadium; Attendance: 14,288; Referee: Ben Williams

13 January 2008 20	Queensland Roar	0–0	Sydney FC	Brisbane
18:00 UTC+10		Report; Summary		Stadium: Suncorp Stadium; Attendance: 31,933; Referee: Mark Shield

20 January 2008 21	Sydney FC	2–2	Melbourne Victory	Sydney
17:00 UTC+11	Corica 4'; Brosque 62'	Report; Summary	Milligan 46' (o.g.); Allsopp 76'	Stadium: Sydney Football Stadium; Attendance: 33,458; Referee: Peter O'Leary

==== Semi-finals ====
25 January 2008 First Leg	Sydney FC	0–0	Queensland Roar	Sydney
20:00 UTC+11		Report; Summary		Stadium: Sydney Football Stadium; Attendance: 23,450; Referee: Mark Shield

8 February 2008 Second Leg	Queensland Roar	2–0 (2–0 agg.)	Sydney FC	Brisbane
20:07 AEST	Reinaldo 13'; S. Ognenovski 84' (pen.)	Report; Summary		Stadium: Suncorp Stadium; Attendance: 36,221; Referee: Mark Shield

== 2008 Pan-Pacific Championship ==
Sydney represented Australia in the inaugural Pan-Pacific Championship held in Hawaii. They placed fourth overall after losing both matches, first to MLS champions Houston Dynamo and then Los Angeles Galaxy in the third place playoff.

20 February 2008 Semi-final	Houston Dynamo (United States)	3–0	(Australia) Sydney FC	Honolulu, United States
	De Rosario 28'; Holden 29'; Wondolowski 43'	Report		Stadium: Aloha Stadium; Attendance: 15,128; Referee: Alex Prus (United States)

23 February 2008 Third place play-off	Los Angeles Galaxy (United States)	2–1	(Australia) Sydney FC	Honolulu, United States
	Allen 3'; Tudela 45'	Report	Renaud 43'	Stadium: Aloha Stadium; Attendance: 23,087; Referee: Brian Hall (United States)

== Home attendance ==
#	Opponent	Round	Attendance	Result
1	Central Coast Mariners	1	18,457	L 1–0
2	Adelaide United	2	14,233	D 2–2
3	Wellington Phoenix	4	11,491	L 1–2
4	Newcastle United Jets	6	13,755	W 1–0
5	Melbourne Victory	7	18,436	L 0–1
6	Adelaide United	9	12,922	L 0–1
7	Central Coast Mariners	10	17,652	W 3–2
8	Queensland Roar	14	16,659	D 0–0
9	Los Angeles Galaxy	Exhibition	80,295	W 5–3
10	Newcastle United Jets	16	10,732	W 1–0
11	Perth Glory	17	12,402	L 2–4
12	Melbourne Victory	21	33,458	D 2–2
13	Queensland Roar	Semi-final	23,450	D 0–0

A-League Regular Season Total: 180,197

A-League Regular Season Average: 16,382

Season Total: 283,942

== Team kit ==
For the third A-League season, all clubs released new playing strip supplied by sponsor Reebok. Sydney FC retained the established colours in a new design, a sky blue home shirt with navy blue and orange secondary colours, and a white away shirt with sky blue trim.

Sydney also signed new sponsorships with Sydney-based electronics retailer Bing Lee and electronic brand JVC. The home strip will feature Bing Lee as the main shirt sponsor with JVC on the shorts, while the away shirt will feature JVC prominently and Bing Lee on the shorts. A second shirt sponsorship was secured with HBA Health Insurance, that will appear on the back of the shirt below the player number.

2007–08 home colours	2007–08 away colours	2007–08 goalkeeper

== Awards ==
- Sydney FC Players Player Award: Alex Brosque
- SMH Members Player of the Year Award: Steve Corica
- Chairman Award: John Kosmina
- Forward of the Year: Alex Brosque
- Midfielder of the Year: Steve Corica
- Defender of the Year: Tony Popovic
- Young Player of the Year Award: Adam Biddle
- Golden Boot: Alex Brosque
- Fans Goal of the Year Award: Brendon Santalab (Goal v Adelaide United Round 18)
