= History of Sydney FC =

Football club in Sydney, Australia

Sydney FC is an association football club based in Sydney, Australia. They play in the A-League, the top-flight association football league of Australia.

== Foundation of the club ==
The first steps towards the foundation of Sydney FC were taken in April 2004 when Soccer New South Wales (now Football NSW) announced their intention to bid for a licence in Australia's new football (soccer) competition. The preference was for the club to play out of Parramatta Stadium.

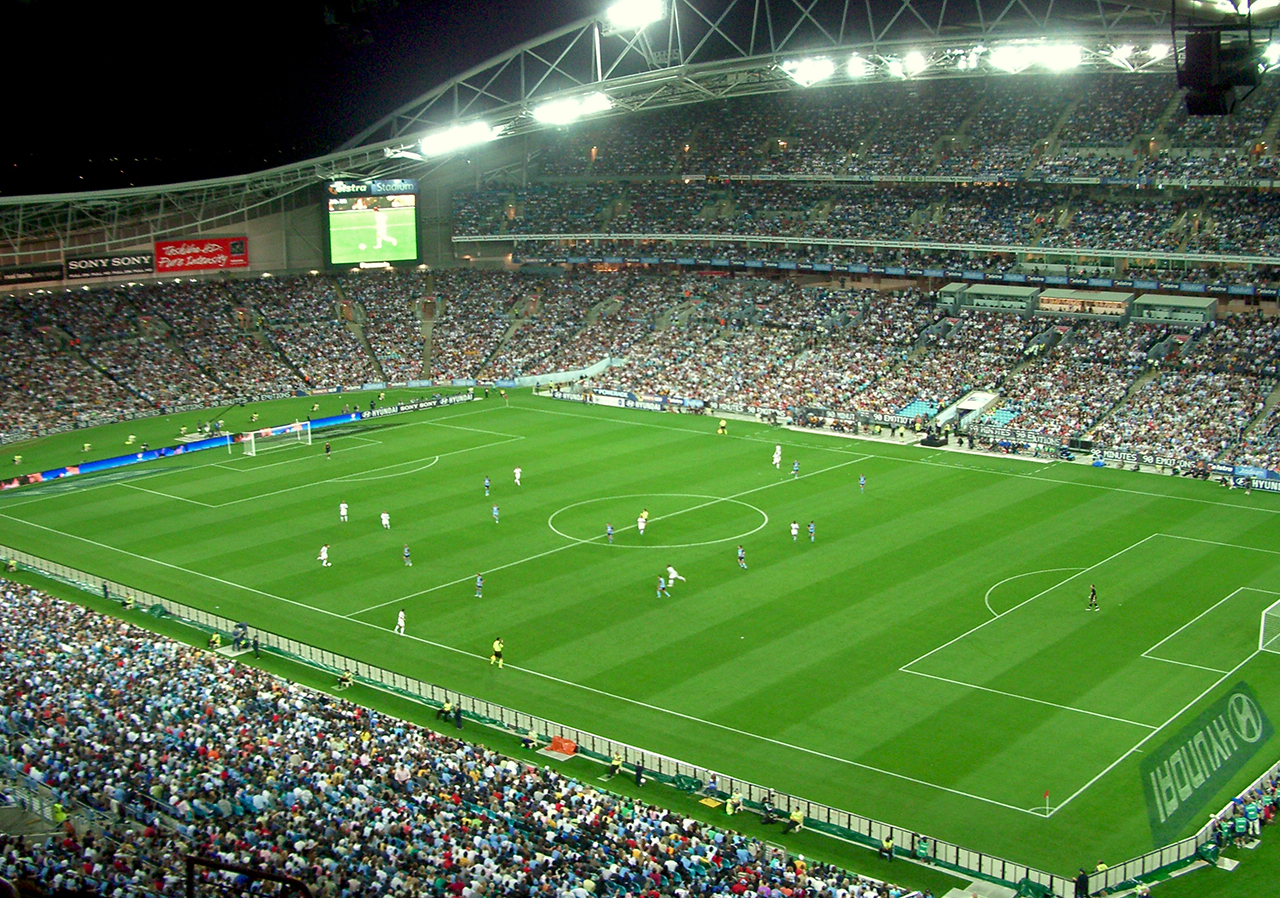
Sydney FC playing the Los Angeles Galaxy at ANZ Stadium during 2007.

The bid was lodged with the Australian Soccer Association (now Football Federation Australia) on 19 July, challenged only by a consortium headed by Nick Politis, known as the "Sydney Blues", for Sydney's place in the 'one team per city' competition. A public row broke out between the two bidders after reports that the ASA were set to vote in favour of Sydney FC, causing Politis to withdraw his support for a team, and leaving Sydney FC as the only candidate remaining.

Sydney was officially launched as a member of the new 8-team A-League on 1 November 2004, with a 25% stake in the club held by Soccer NSW, the remainder privately owned. Walter Bugno was announced as the inaugural chairman of the club. On 11 December 2004, Soccer NSW announced that it would pull out of its involvement with Sydney FC amid concerns over part owner Frank Lowy's autocratic style in establishing the club and lack of consultation with Soccer NSW on key Sydney FC issues. These included the choice of the Sydney Football Stadium over Parramatta Stadium as the team's home ground, and the erosion of Soccer NSW's initial 100 per cent involvement to just 25 per cent.

By February 2005, Sydney had filled 16 of their allowed 20 squad positions – attracting Socceroos Clint Bolton, Steve Corica and David Zdrilic as well as youth internationals Justin Pasfield, Mark Milligan, Wade Oostendorp, Iain Fyfe and Jacob Timpano. German Pierre Littbarski was signed as head coach, to be assisted by former Norwich City player Ian Crook. Sydney FC played its first ever match against Manly United FC on 25 March 2005, winning 6–1. Shortly after, Sydney set off on a tour to the United Arab Emirates to play matches against local teams FC Hatta, Al Ain FC and Al Jazira, winning all three. Whilst in Dubai, Sydney FC announced that they had agreed to terms with former Manchester United player Dwight Yorke to join Sydney as their "marquee player" – one paid outside of the $1.5 million salary cap — for two seasons.

== Pre-League ==
Sydney FC's first competitive match was held against Brisbane Roar at Central Coast Stadium in Gosford as part of an Australian qualifying tournament to enter the 2005 Oceania Club Championship. After winning the match 3–0, Sydney went on to defeat Perth Glory and the Central Coast Mariners to win their first piece of silverware and qualify for the Oceania Club Championship, to be held in Tahiti. Despite an early scare against New Zealand club Auckland City FC, Sydney won all of their matches in the competition and qualified for the 2005 FIFA Club World Championship in Japan. The start of the 2005 Pre-Season Cup marked Sydney FC's first match at Sydney Football Stadium, as well as Dwight Yorke's first appearance for the club – Yorke scoring the first goal of Sydney's 3–1 win which stretched their unbeaten run to 9 competitive matches (15 including friendlies). Upon reaching the semi-finals, Sydney's unbeaten run finally ended at 11 with Perth Glory midfielder Nick Ward scoring in injury time to inflict the new club's first ever loss.

=== Season 1 – 2005–2006 ===
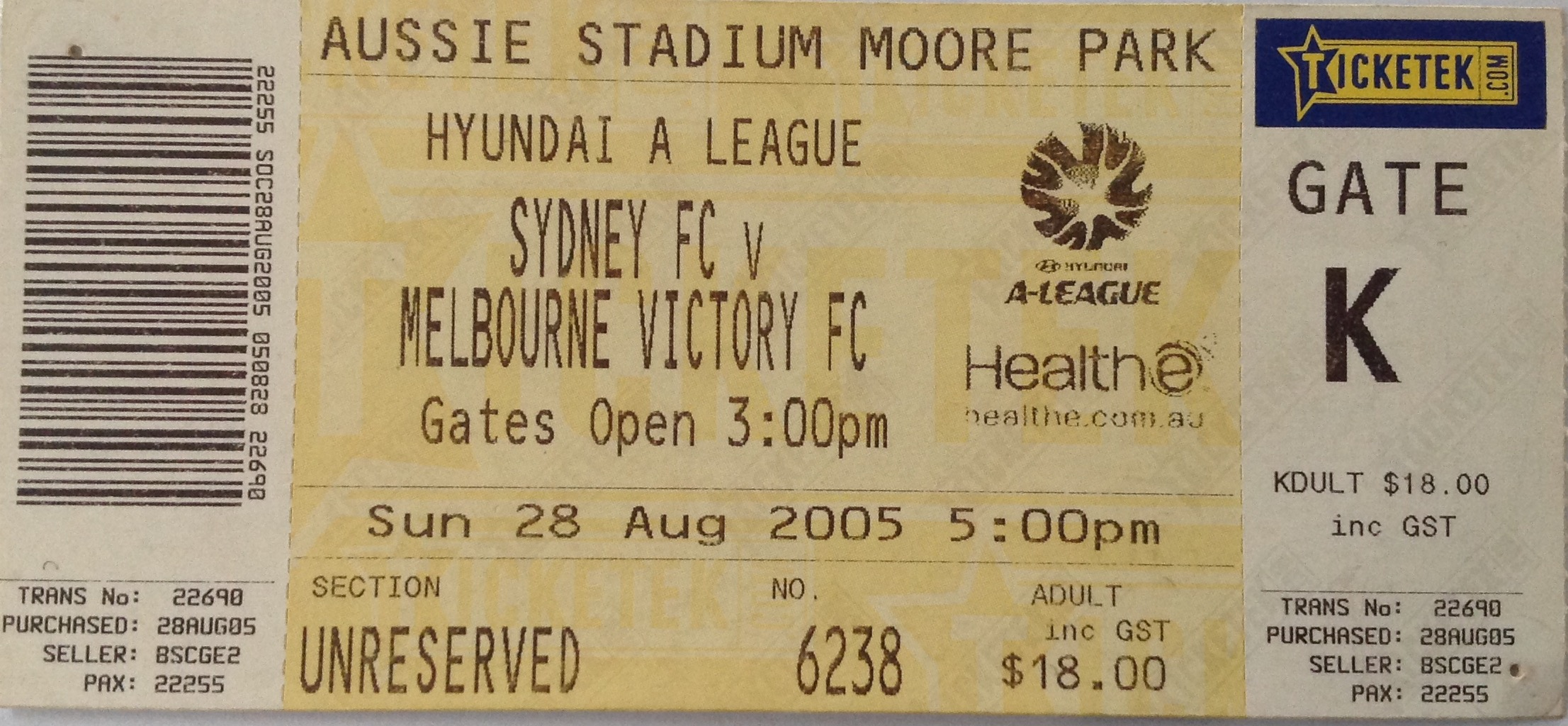
Ticket for the inaugural Sydney FC game

Sydney FC entered the inaugural A-League season as heavy favourites for the title, and hosted their first league match against Melbourne Victory on 28 August 2005. This event drew a then-record crowd for a regular season match in Australia. The stated figure was 35,208 although this is likely to be an underestimation of the true crowd size. A large number of people who 'walked up' to the game was unmanageable for ticket sellers at the gate, and for only the second time in the history of the SCG Trust (the operators of Sydney Football Stadium), the gates were opened twenty minutes after the game had started, permitting around two–thousand fans to enter for free.

The season saw mixed results for Sydney in the new competition, including a 5–0 loss to Melbourne in October followed by a 5–1 win over Central Coast Mariners a month later. With a place in the finals-series on the line, Sydney lost just one of their last seven games to secure second place at the conclusion of the twenty–one game regular season, seven points behind Adelaide United. Sydney had beaten Adelaide 2–1 in the final round and again faced them in the Major Semi–Final. Over two legs, they defeated Adelaide 4–3 on aggregate, ensuring a home Grand Final which produced a sell–out crowd of 41,689 (above the stated capacity of Sydney Football Stadium). On 5 March 2006 they faced Central Coast Mariners, the nearest club to Sydney by distance, in the inaugural A-League Grand Final. Sydney won the match 1–0 after Dwight Yorke set up Steve Corica for the deciding goal, to claim the first A-League Championship.

During the off-season, coach Pierre Littbarski left the club following a dispute over his contract which involved a significant pay cut from his reported $700,000 first year salary. He was replaced by former England international and Motherwell manager Terry Butcher on 17 May 2006. Preparing for their second season, Sydney FC recruited Ruben Zadkovich (previously on a short-term contract with Sydney FC), Alex Brosque (Queensland Roar) and Jeremy Brockie (New Zealand Knights).

=== Season 2 – 2006–2007 ===
The second season of the Hyundai A-League ("dubbed Version 2.0") was ultimately an unsuccessful and disappointing season for the defending champions. The club's administration had spent far more than it had earned over the course of the past two years, and subsequent budget cutbacks included the sale of marquee forward Dwight Yorke, a significantly reduced advertising campaign, and the loss of German coach Pierre Littbarski. The team's displays on the field were widely reported by Australian sports media to have ranged from showing glimpses of strong form to marked disappointment, and no real challenge for the premiership was mounted.

The off-field administration of the club came under equally heavy criticism. There were disruptions and disagreements within the club's controlling board, and disruptions in the dressing room involving several senior players and coach Terry Butcher. Amongst many other unfortunate events, the club was fined A$129,000 and three competition points for an alleged salary cap breach involving David Zdrillic. The Sydney FC squad also suffered through remarkably bad fortune with regards to injuries; at one point, only thirteen players were fit & available on the team sheet, including regular second-choice keeper Justin Pasfield. All of this amounted to disappointing attendances, ugly displays of football from what were previously regarded as a good team to watch and relatively poor performances.

Eventually, Sydney progressed to the finals series only by way of a hard-fought draw against the Queensland Roar in the final match of the regular season. The Newcastle Jets were drawn as the team's initial play-off opponents in the final series. Sydney Won the first leg 2–1 at home but lost the second leg 0–2 away and they were ultimately defeated by the Jets 3–2 over the course the two (home and away) legs.

==== 2007 Asian Champions League campaign ====
Sydney FC participated in the 2007 Asian Champions League along with Adelaide United. The campaign was considered ultimately a success despite finishing second behind J-League powerhouse club, and eventual champions Urawa Red Diamonds. Sydney defeated Shanghai Shenhua 2–1 in their opening game at Yuanshen Stadium with goals from Steve Corica and Ufuk Talay. Their second game against Urawa Red Diamonds in Sydney finished an exciting 2–2 draw, with Uwawa fighting back from 2–0 down. However they lost their third game to Indonesian Super League champions Persik Kediri who won 2–1 in pouring rain. However Sydney would beat them 3–0 in the return leg at Parramatta Stadium with Corica scoring twice. In order to progress to the second round of the Champions League, Sydney would have to beat Urawa Red Diamonds at their home ground. However they could only manage to ground out a 0–0 draw, and Urawa went through by just 1 point. Steve Corica scored 4 goals in the League.

=== Season 3 – 2007–2008 ===
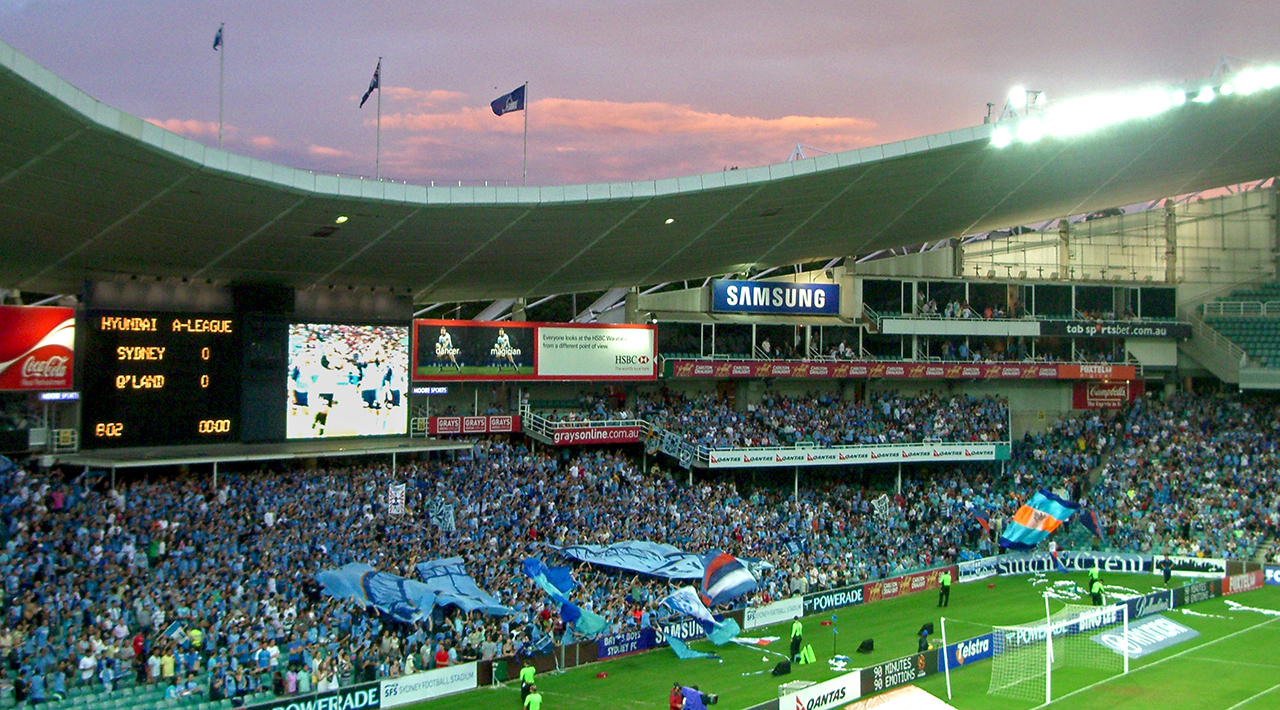
Sydney FC fans before kickoff during the 2007–08 A-League finals series.

For the third Hyundai A-league season, Sydney FC's playing squad retained a majority of players from the previous AFC Champion's League campaign, but was nonetheless altered through activity in the transfer market. On 5 August, David Carney was transferred for A$125,000 to English Championship side Sheffield United. The former Sydney player signed a three-year deal with the club which was reported to have been earning him around A$1.25 million a year.

New players included former Socceroos regular Tony Popovic and former LA Galaxy attacking midfielder, Michael Enfield. On 3 August 2007 Brazilian international Juninho Paulista, formerly of Celtic and Middlesbrough, signed with Sydney FC as the team's marquee player. They also secured youth players Ben Vidaic and Adam Biddle. Tony Popovic and Mark Milligan were named as captain and vice-captain, respectively. On 15 October 2007 Michael Bridges was signed on a season-long loan deal from Hull City as a replacement for Michael Enfield, who had sustained a serious knee injury.

After an early season run of disappointing results, on 22 October 2007, it was announced that manager Branko Culina would be sacked from the club. On 23 October, former Adelaide United coach John Kosmina was presented as the new head coach of the team. Kosmina got the side off to a flying start under his tenure, winning a clash with table-topping rivals Central Coast in a thrilling 3–2 victory before a crowd of nearly 18,000 at the SFS – a sign of bigger things to come for the Blues. This was followed by an impressive 1–0 away victory over the Newcastle Jets, as with former England junior Michael Bridges recorded his first goal in the A-League. An entertaining 0–0 draw at the Telstra Dome with rivals Melbourne Victory followed, as Sydney FC – still undefeated under Kosmina – began climbing the competition's ladder.

During all of this, the Los Angeles Galaxy played a one-off exhibition match against Sydney FC at Sydney's Stadium Australia on 27 November 2007. Sydney FC won the match, which was broadcast nationally on free-to-air TV by Network Ten, 5–3. David Beckham scored the first goal for the LA Galaxy from a free kick right on half time, as a crowd of over 80,000 looked on.

On 22 December, a crucial match against the Central Coast Mariners resulted in a 5–4 victory in favour of Sydney. The match, held at Bluetongue Central Coast Stadium, was described by critics as the best game ever to come from the A-League. The win was especially savoured after Sydney were down 2–0 after 15 minutes. The controversial sending-off of Mariners goalkeeper Danny Vukovic in the 16th minute turned the match in favour of Sydney. Ufuk Talay scored their 5th goal via a penalty in stoppage time.

On Friday 28 December 2007, Sydney FC came from behind for the second time in two weeks to defeat Adelaide United 3–1 and keep its unbeaten away record intact in front of a record Adelaide crowd of 25,039. A win over Wellington Phoenix and draws with Queensland Roar in Brisbane and Melbourne Victory in Sydney in front of the highest crowd of the season (for all A-League teams) gave Sydney a final league position of 3rd.

On Friday 26 January, Sydney played out a nil–all draw for the first leg of the semi-final against the Queensland Roar in front of 23,450 fans at the Sydney Football Stadium. The teams then met again two weeks later in Brisbane to face off for the second leg. Marquee player Juninho, who had been in and out of the team all season with various leg and back problems, had been ruled out with a knee injury that he picked up in training, and Ruben Zadkovich was announced as his replacement. The Roar scored in the 14th minute through their Brazilian import Reinaldo, and Sydney FC was subsequently defeated and knocked out of the running for the 2007/2008 A-league championship and AFC Champions League qualification. Instead, the team was placed into the 2008 Pan-Pacific Championship.

==== 2008 Pan-Pacific Championship ====
Sydney FC were chosen as the A-League's representative at the 2008 Pan-Pacific Championships which were to be held in Hawaii at Aloha Stadium. Their first match was against Major League Soccer champions Houston Dynamo. Sydney FC were comprehensively thrashed 3–0 with goals coming from Dwayne De Rosario, Stuart Holden, and Chris Wondolowski. Sydney's second and final game wasn't to be much better, losing to Los Angeles Galaxy 2–1 with goals from Ely Allen and Josh Tudela, although Sydney FC got a goal back through a cracker strike from Brendan Renaud. Sydney FC finished last in the 4 team Championship.

=== Season 4 – 2008–2009 ===
Sydney FC again recruited heavily going into the fourth season of the A-League, with three major signings to the club; Socceroos stars John Aloisi from the Central Coast Mariners and Simon Colosimo from Perth Glory were acquired, along with the only goal scorer in the 2008 grand final, Olyroo Mark Bridge. Shortly after, midfielders Stuart Musialik from the Newcastle Jets and Mitchell Prentice from Perth Glory were transferred in. Alongside this heavy recruitment, a large number of players whose contracts had endeded after the 2007–08 season were let go: Mark Rudan (Avispa Fukuoka), Ufuk Talay (Avispa Fukuoka), Ruben Zadkovich (Derby County), David Zdrilic (released), Patrick da Silva (released), Ben Vidaic (released), Mark Milligan (uncontracted), Juninho (released), Brendan Renaud (released), Mark Robertson (released).

The season began with early wins against Perth Glory, the Mariners, and Adelaide United, as well as draws against rivals Melbourne Victory, Queensland Roar, and Newcastle Jets. For a while, the 'glamour club' sat second on the ladder, 2 points behind Melbourne. A milestone was achieved for the club when veteran midfielder Steve Corica scored a goal against Adelaide United and became the club's highest ever goal scorer, a title previously held by Sasho Petrovski. On 11 November, captain Tony Popovic announced his immediate retirement, and became the club's assistant coach. Sadly, and following an increasingly alarming yearly pattern, the team's performance slumped in the second half of the season, and the club sank to 6th place (of eight teams) on the A-League ladder.

A late rally saw Sydney FC finish the 2008–09 season in 5th place, two points outside the top 4. This was the first season where the harbour city team had failed to qualify for the finals series, and coach John Kosmina was swiftly, officially sacked on Saturday, 31 January 2009. The club's fortunes had, by now, noticeably declined since its blue ribbon debut, and with the end of the 2008–09 season several there came another clearing out of the player roster. Brendon Santalab, Robbie Middleby and Jacob Timpano left, but would reunite at new franchise club North Queensland, whilst Adelaide-born Iain Fyfe headed home to Adelaide United. Dutch player Bobby Petta and American midfielder Mike Enfield were released by the club, and Dez Giraldi's loan spell finished with a return to the NSWPL.

=== Season 5 – 2009–10 ===
Season 5 was a major success for Sydney FC, and would be seen as the most successful season thus far. John Kosmina was fired and replaced by former AC Sparta Prague player and manager Vitezslav Lavicka. Along with a new board controlling the club, Sydney FC set out to become once more the league leaders both on and off the field. New training and fitness regimes were introduced, as well as a long list of friendlies against NSW Premier League clubs, which was dubbed "The Tour of NSW". The squad was kept largely intact, with Lavicka not releasing many, except those who has already signed for other clubs. The season started strongly with a 3–2 away victory against league newcomers North Queensland Fury. The success for would continue for Sydney FC, with many impressive results, including a 3–0 victory against arch-rivals Melbourne Victory in Melbourne. The team would not drop out of the top 4 for the entire season, and despite a mid-season slump, which saw Sydney FC lose 3 games on the trot, however strong end of season performances including a 3–2 victory against Perth Glory at Parramatta Stadium and a 2–0 defeat of Melbourne Victory at the Sydney Football Stadium to finish first and take out the Premiership.

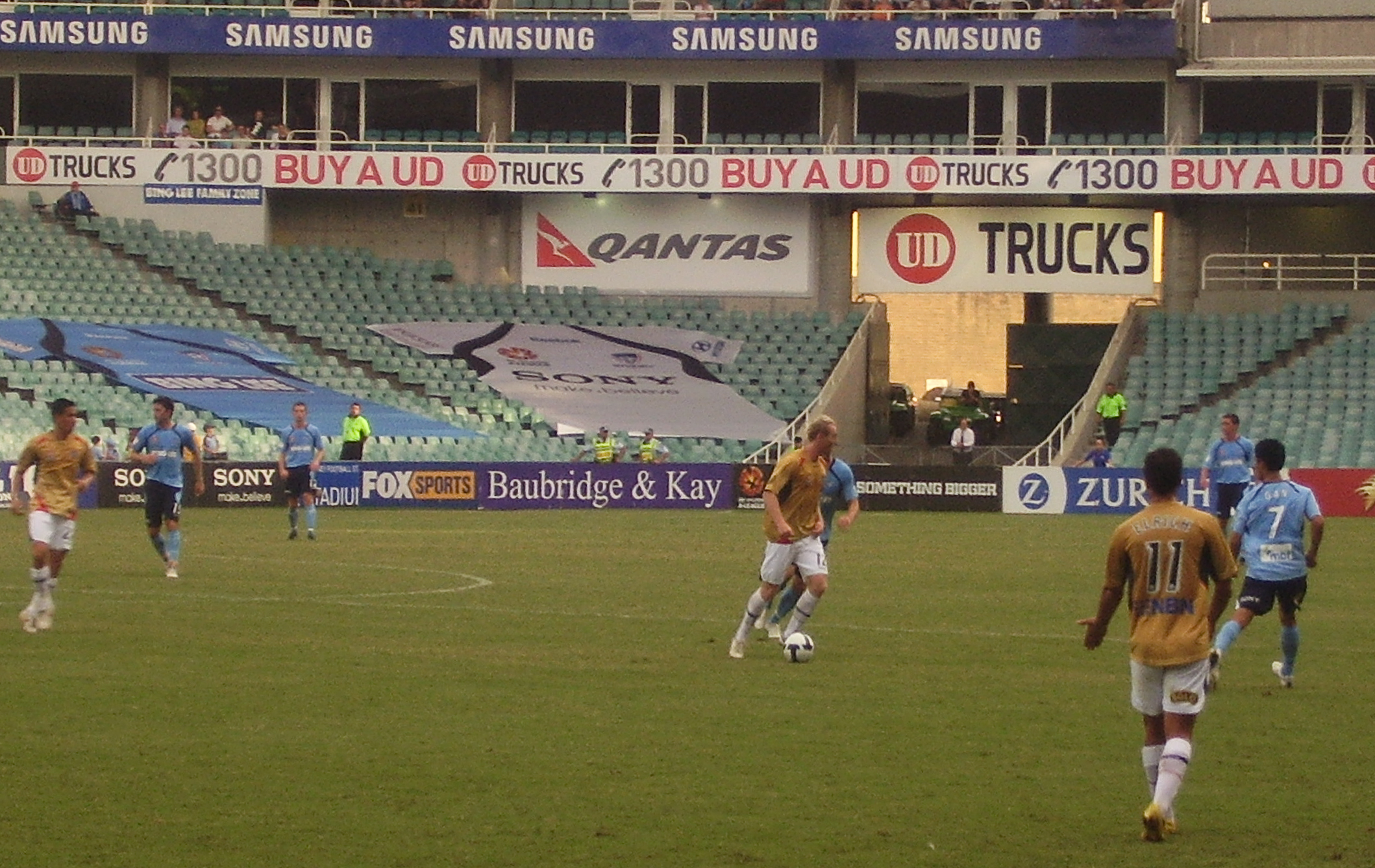
Sydney FC V Newcastle Jets, November 2009

Sydney FC & Melbourne would be paired off in the double-legged major semi final, with the first game being held at Etihad Stadium in Melbourne. Melbourne would go on to win this 2–1, and the return leg finished 2–2, Melbourne going through to host the Grand Final. Sydney would play Wellington Phoenix, who had defeated the Newcastle Jets in the minor-semi final, and win 4–2 to go through to play Melbourne in the final. The final was held on 20 March 2010, at Melbourne's home ground of Etihad Stadium. The match finished 1–1 with both goals coming in the second half from Mark Bridge (Sydney FC) and Adrian Leijer (Melbourne Victory). The game would go into 2 halves of Extra Time, however neither team could find a goal, so it would end up being decided by penalties. Sydney would win the shootout 4–2 with goalkeeper Clint Bolton saving Marvin Angulo's penalty. Kevin Muscat missed his penalty which gave Sydney a massive boost in confidence. South Korean import Byun Sung-Hwan would score the winning penalty for Sydney FC, and hand them their second title since their inaugural title in 2006.

=== Season 6 – 2010–11 ===
After winning the double last season, Sydney started the season poorly. They broke the record for most winless games since the start of an A-League season. It took Sydney FC 10 games to get a win. In a season with few highlights, and low crowds, Sydney FC finished 9th in the competition, behind Perth Glory and North Queensland Fury, the latter would become defunct following the conclusion of the season. However one of the bright moments in the year for the senior team would be the re-signing of manager Vitezslav Lavicka whose position at the club had come under much question and scrutiny after the team's poor start to the season.

==== 2011 Asian Champions League campaign ====
Despite a poor 2010–11 season, following several key players being released to other clubs, Sydney were expected to do well during the 2011 Asian Champions League. Unfortunately, Sydney struggled against the superior Asian teams from Japan, however gained 2 points from their opening 2 rounds against Kashima Antlers and Shanghai Shenhua. The home leg against Shanghai was a frustrating match where Sydney missed several easy chances and being forced to settle for a 1–1 draw. In Sydney's final home match against Korean team Suwon Samsung Bluewings, Sydney were belted 3–0 by a dominant Bluewings outfit. However, the team regained some faith with a twice come-from-behind win against Shanghai Shenhua in Shanghai, China winning 3–2 with Brazilian striker Bruno Cazarine helping with a brace.

Sydney would go on to finish 3rd out of 4 teams, unable to qualify for the Round of 16, winning 1 game, drawing 2 and losing 3.

=== Season 7 – 2011–2012 ===
The third season under Lavicka began with the major signing of Blackburn Rovers player Brett Emerton to a three-year deal. The signing was significant in that Emerton became the first player to directly exchange the Premier League for the A-League by terminating his Rovers contract one year early. The season however, only provided minimal success as the club scraped through to the finals series with a 3–2 win over the Newcastle Jets in the final round of the regular season. Before the end of the season the club announced that head coach Lavicka's contract would not be renewed for the following season.

=== Season 8 – 2012–13 ===
The 2012–13 season was one of high drama. There was a new appointment of head coach Ian Crook and a high turnover of players in the off season. The expectations changed from a year of rebuilding to title contenders when the club acquired the services of international superstar Alessandro Del Piero. He signed on for $2 million per year and became the highest-paid footballer to ever play in the A-League.

After only six weeks into the regular season Sydney were forced to find a new coach with the shock resignation of Crook. He cited the role was "a constant burden" and was adversely affecting his health. Frank Farina was confirmed as Crook's successor for the season two games into Steve Corica's interim spell. During the January transfer window, Farina bolstered his defensive stocks with Socceroos captain Lucas Neill and Brazilian Tiago Calvano joining the team. The pair made zero impact and with a 3–1 loss away from home to Brisbane Roar, Sydney were unable to pick up a vital point that would have seen them play finals football, finishing seventh.

=== Season 9 – 2013–14 ===
For the 2013–14 pre season, the club became the first club in A-League history to tour in Europe, as Sydney toured in Venice, Italy, where the club played against Del Piero's first professional club, Padova, Udinese, Vicenza, AS Cittadella, Venezia and Reggiana. Sydney won half of these six games however upon returning home lost five consecutive friendly games in the lead up to the season proper. Two-thirds of the way into the season and with Sydney FC only accumulating 4 points from 8 games, fans began to express concerns over the vision for the club. Banners at the club's home game against Adelaide included sentiments like "We want Farina gone." There was also a mass exodus from the club's active supporter group, The Cove. The club then held a fan forum to receive questions and communicate the direction of the club. During the last nine rounds, Sydney FC only lost two games making the finals. The club lost to Melbourne Victory in the first week of the finals. This marked the end of the Frank Farina reign.

=== Season 10 – 2014–15 ===
On 8 May 2014, Sydney FC announced that Graham Arnold would be the club's head coach for the 2014–15 A-League season. With retirements to Brett Emerton in January and club legend Terry McFlynn, and the contract expirations of marquee player Alessandro Del Piero, Ranko Despotović and Richard Garcia, there was a lot of experience to be filled by the club. Arnold announced his first signing on 12 May 2014, acquiring the services of Bernie Ibini-Isei, who he previously managed at the Mariners. Sydney then announced signings of prolific A-League goalscorer Shane Smeltz and the return of Alex Brosque. After months of searching Arnold found his new marquee man in Austria national football team captain Marc Janko. On 8 October 2014, Brosque was announced as the captain of Sydney FC for the 2014–15 A-League season, alongside vice-captains Sasa Ognenovski and Nikola Petković. Sydney FC's season began with the highly anticipated match-up against the newly re-branded Melbourne City and guest superstar David Villa. Whilst not starting the game, Villa came on early in the second half to claim the equalising goal, the result ending 1–1. Sydney FC continued on an eight-game undefeated streak that ended when Perth Glory came from behind to score two goals in the final seven minutes to claim victory at Allianz Stadium. The following week saw another thrilling Big Blue in Melbourne ending 3–3. Sydney FC struggled for form as they moved closer to the January break for the 2015 AFC Asian Cup, not scoring in four consecutive matches. During this break, Sydney FC were able to bolster their stocks, signing Senegalese internationals (and cousins) Mickaël Tavares and Jacques Faty as injury replacement players. Upon resumption, Sydney FC posted 19 (out of a possible 21) points in the next seven rounds. Whilst slipping up twice at home to Melbourne City and Adelaide United (losing 0–1 in both games) during the final six rounds, Sydney FC managed to win all four other games away from home to finish second on the ladder with 50 points for the season. By the end of the regular season, Sydney FC had broken many records including a record club home season attendance (41,213 vs. Western Sydney Wanderers) and a league record number of away games undefeated in a season, as well as becoming the first club to score three or more goals in five consecutive games. Marquee Marc Janko also set his own A-League record for most consecutive goalscoring appearances with seven. After having the first week of the finals off, Sydney FC met Adelaide in the semi-finals at home. A brace from Alex Brosque set Sydney up for a 4–1 win. Ultimately, Sydney FC were outplayed in the 2015 A-League Grand Final, defeated by Melbourne Victory 3–0 at AAMI Park.

=== Season 11 – 2015–16 ===
The following season was significantly less successful, finishing seventh in the league despite the star power of marquee Filip Hološko, and Serbian playmaker Miloš Ninković, the club was unable to find an adequate replacement for former marquee and golden boot winner Marc Janko.

==== 2016 Asian Champions League campaign ====
Despite a poor 2015–16 season, following several key players being released to other clubs, Sydney were expected to do well during the 2016 Asian Champions League, being drawn in Group H against Urawa Red Diamonds, Pohang Steelers and defending champions Guangzhou Evergrande. Despite losing the opening match to Urawa Red Diamonds in Saitama, Sydney managed to upset Guangzhou Evergrande 2–1 at Allianz in front of a crowd of 18,149, with Robert Stambolziev and Miloš Dimitrijević scoring. Sydney would go on to finish 1st out of 4 teams：winning 3 games, drawing 1 and losing 2. Sydney progressed to the knockout stages for the first time. In the round of 16 Sydney were drawn against Chinese club Shandong Taishan, who they drew 1–1 with in the first leg in Jinan. Despite taking the lead twice in the second leg thanks to goals from Brandon O'Neill and Rhyan Grant, as well as goalkeeper Vedran Janjetović saving a penalty to keep the score at 2–1, a Zac Anderson brain explosion in the 76th minute meant the club had to see out the final fifteen minutes with ten men. Sydney managed to hold Shandong Taishan off until the 90th minute when Hao Junmin scored an equaliser to put the clubs level on aggregate, and Shandong ahead on away goals.

=== Season 12 – 2016–17 ===
Arnold reformed Sydney for the 2016–17 season, beginning with the signings of Socceroos centreback Alex Wilkinson, and leftback Michael Zullo both from Melbourne City. Joshua Brillante joined the Sky Blues on a three-year deal, keeping him at the Harbour City until 2019. The goalkeeping ranks were soon bolstered by the signing of Danny Vukovic, the A-League's most capped player who also held a record A-League clean sheet tally. Bernie Ibini also rejoined the club on loan from Club Brugge, following a horrific leg injury. The biggest signing however was that of Brazilian striker Bobô on a one-year marquee deal, rejoining his former Besiktas teammate Filip Holosko. The season started with a 4–0 win over rivals Western Sydney in the Sydney Derby with new striker Bobô scoring on debut. They went on a six-game winning streak from this, conceding on one goal. The club also reached the 2016 FFA Cup final for the first time, losing to Melbourne City 1–0, in a highly controversial match.

This did not affect the momentum however, with Arnold's men going 19 games unbeaten before losing to Western Sydney in the Sydney Derby in another highly controversial loss, where a foul made by Robert Cornthwaite on captain Alex Brosque inside the 18-yard-box was not called by Chris Beath. Beath later admitted that he made the wrong call during the match. They marched on yet again, winning the Premier's Plate, the club's first piece of silverware in seven years, with four rounds to go and breaking numerous A-League records, including: most competition points, most wins in a season, fewest goals conceded, most clean sheets and best goal difference. Marquee striker Bobô ended the regular season as top scorer with 15 goals, narrowly missing Marc Janko's record of 16. The club qualified for the 2018 AFC Champions League after finishing first, which will be their fourth Asian Champions League campaign.

They finished the season as double winners – winning the 2017 A-League Grand Final on penalties against Melbourne Victory at Allianz Stadium. The winning penalty was scored by Johnny Warren medallist Milos Ninkovic who re-signed for a following year the next day, before also being named Player of the Season, Members Player of the Season and the Players Player of the Season at the club awards night.

=== Season 13 – 2017–18 ===
The Sky Blues went on a successful FFA Cup run in 2017, starting with an 8–0 thumping of Northern Territory amateur side Darwin Rovers, with Bobô scoring a club record 4 goals in the match. The following round they played NPL2 side Bankstown Berries, winning 3–0 in a fairly scrappy match, with goals from David Carney, Bobô, and a debut goal from new signing Adrian Mierzejewski in injury time to put them through to the quarter-finals. Sydney drew Melbourne City, in a rematch of the previous years final. An early goal from Jordy Buijs put Sydney up 1–0, before a second half goal from captain Alex Brosque sealed the win at Leichhardt Oval. In the semifinals, they faced yet another Melbourne side, with a trip to Lakeside Stadium to play South Melbourne FC booked. The Sky Blues ran out 5–1 winners, with a brace from Bobô sealing their date with destiny in the 2017 FFA Cup final to play Adelaide United. The final was played at Sydney Football Stadium, only the second time it had hosted an FFA Cup match. The Harbour City Originals opened the scoring on 20 minutes, as Miloš Ninković latched onto a through ball, before sliding past a defender and poking a shot past goalkeeper Paul Izzo. The slender one-goal lead only had them in front until an equaliser by Nikola Mileusnic got Adelaide back into the game. The game was forced into extra time, before Bobô scored a header on 111 minutes to win the FFA Cup for Sydney FC.

The 2017–18 season proved to be successful after the FFA Cup win, with the Sky Blues becoming the first ever club to win back-to-back premierships in the A-League era, and the first in Australian national league history since Melbourne Knights, who successfully defended their title in the 1994–95 National Soccer League.

With Graham Arnold being chosen to take over the Australian national team coaching role after the 2018 FIFA World Cup, his time at the club ended when his team was defeated 3–2 by Melbourne Victory, after extra time in a semi-final of the A-League finals series of 2017/18.

==== 2018 Asian Champions League campaign ====
Despite a strong 2017–18 season, Sydney were expected to do well during the 2018 Asian Champions League. Ironically, they were placed in the same group as they did in 2011 campaign. Despite Sydney FC beating Suwon away from home and going undefeated in all away matches, the club was unable to score a goal at home and went winless in their home matches. Sydney finished their disappointing 2018 campaign in 3rd place, two points behind eventual champions Kashima Antlers, unable to progress to the knockout stage for the second time.

== W-League ==
=== Season 1 – 2008–2009 ===
With the foundation of the W-League in 2008, Sydney FC created its W-League team. Captained by Australian international Heather Garriock Sydney's first season saw mixed results. Sydney FC finished midtable in 4th spot, sneaking into the finals, however lost out to eventual champions Brisbane in the semi-finals.

=== Season 2 – 2009 ===
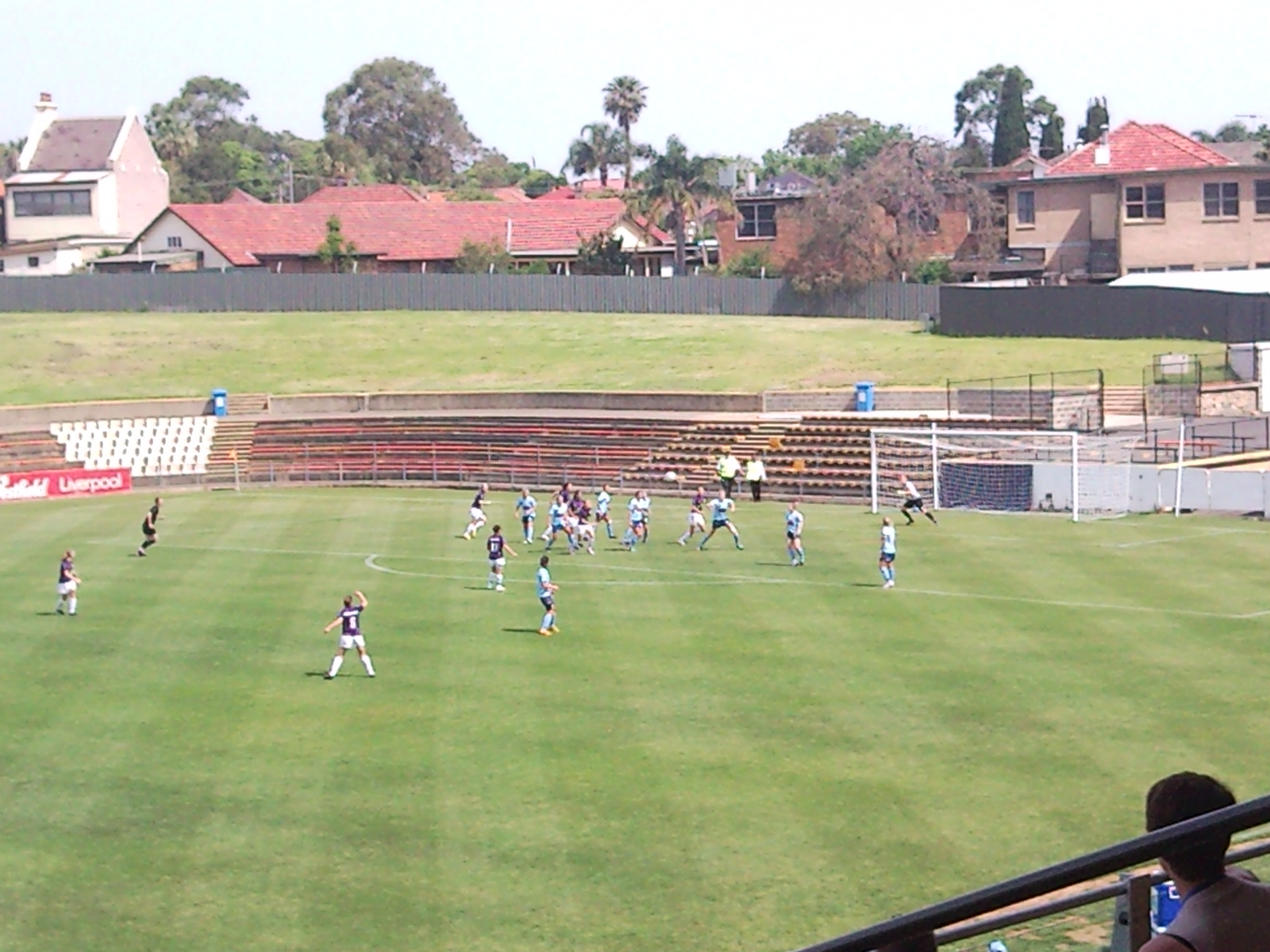
Sydney FC W-League V Perth Glory W-League at Leichhardt Oval

The second season of the W-League was much better for the Harbourside club. They welcomed 2 new foreign signings, Danish internationals Julie Rydahl Bukh and Cathrine Paaske-Sørensen who both brought much valuable experience to the club. The addition of these two players helped Sydney to claim the minor premiership in the W-League for the first time, and also went on to becoming Champions, defeating previous season's champions Brisbane Roar 3–2 at Toyota Park.

=== Season 3 – 2010–11 ===
Season 3 for Sydney FC was a brilliant season, winning 8 of their 10 games, and scoring 29 goals as well as finishing Premiers of the 2010 competition with rivals Brisbane Roar being runners up. In the semi-final against The City Derby rivals Melbourne Victory Sydney won 5–1 at Campbelltown Stadium, with striker Leena Khamis scoring a brace. However, after a hard-fought battle, Sydney would go on to lose the Grand Final against Brisbane Roar 2–1.

== Youth League ==
=== Season 1 – 2008–2009 ===
The Inugrial Youth League season for Sydney FC, was a massive success, with their team going through the entire season on top of the ladder, and only losing 3 out of 18 games, with a goal difference of +21, amassing a mega 41 goals. The team would also go on to win the Championship, easily defeating Adelaide United 2–0 in the final. Notable players who would go on to play for Sydney FC, and other A-League clubs included:

- Kofi Danning – (Sydney FC)
- Chris Payne – (Sydney FC)
- Rhyan Grant – (Sydney FC)
- Brendan Gan – (Sydney FC)
- Antony Golec – (Sydney FC)
- Robbie Mileski – (Sydney FC)
- Chris Triantis – (Sydney Olympic)
- Sean Rooney – (Newcastle Jets)
- Vedran Janjetovic – (Sydney Olympic, Brisbane Roar)

=== Season 2 – 2009–10 ===
The second season of the National Youth League would not be as successful as their first. Despite boasting a strong squad on paper, including several players who had had senior squad experience, they would miss out on the finals coming 5th. However many of the players gained good experience, being selected for the Australian Under 21 team

=== Season 3 – 2010–11 ===
Season 3 would once again be a poor season for the Sydney FC youth team, despite boasting a strong team this time they finished bottom of the ladder, with only 4 wins from 16 rounds. Coaches by former Sydney FC and Socceroos representative Steve Corica Sydney FC struggled against much better opposition from the Gold Coast United, Brisbane Roar and Melbourne Victory. The only players to make the breakthrough to the senior team during the season were Matthew Jurman (who received senior 1-year contract, only to move up to Brisbane Roar for the 2011–12 season), Dimitri Petratos (offered a 2-year contract) and Terry Antonis – made 5 appearances during the season. However, Nathan Sherlock, Jared Lum, Luke Austin, Joel Chianese, Blake Powell, Dylan Mitchell were all selected in the senior squad for the 2011 Asian Champions League. All 5 players made their senior debut in friendlies against Sydney United and APIA Leichhardt Tigers post 2010–11 season.
