= 2008–09 Sydney FC season =

Sydney FC
2008–09 season
- Chairman: Andrew Kemeny
- Manager: John Kosmina
- A-League: 5th
- A-League Pre-Season Challenge Cup: Group stage (3rd)
- Top goalscorer: Alex Brosque 5 Goals
- Highest home attendance: 18,251 v Central Coast Mariners (Round 10)
- Lowest home attendance: 8,502 v Queensland Roar (Round 13)
Home colours	Away colours

The 2008–09 season is Sydney FC's fourth season of football (soccer) in Australia, and will compete in the 2008–09 A-League season.

== 2008-09 Squad ==
Note: Flags indicate national team as defined under FIFA eligibility rules; some limited exceptions apply. Players may hold more than one non-FIFA nationality.

No.	Pos.	Nation	Player
1	GK	AUS	Clint Bolton
2	DF	AUS	Iain Fyfe
3	DF	AUS	Nikolas Tsattalios
4	MF	AUS	Simon Colosimo
5	MF	AUS	Mitchell Prentice
7	DF	AUS	Robbie Middleby
8	MF	AUS	Stuart Musialik
10	MF	AUS	Steve Corica (captain)
11	FW	AUS	Brendon Santalab
12	MF	AUS	Shannon Cole
14	FW	AUS	Alex Brosque
15	MF	NIR	Terry McFlynn
16	FW	AUS	Chris Payne
17	DF	AUS	Jacob Timpano
18	FW	AUS	Adam Casey

No.	Pos.	Nation	Player
19	FW	AUS	Mark Bridge
20	GK	AUS	Ivan Necevski
21	MF	AUS	Adam Biddle
22	MF	USA	Michael Enfield
23	FW	AUS	John Aloisi
25	MF	AUS	Robbie Mileski
27	DF	AUS	Matthew Jurman
28	MF	NED	Bobby Petta
29	DF	AUS	Beau Busch
30	GK	AUS	John Filan
31	DF	AUS	Antony Golec
32	MF	AUS	Brendan Gan
34	MF	AUS	Rhyan Grant
35	FW	AUS	Kofi Danning
36	DF	AUS	Zachary Cairncross

== Pre-season ==
Sydney commenced pre-season training on 28 April 2008, and have been actively promoting the club to the Sydney community in the lead up to the season.

A number of friendly matches against NSW Premier League opposition are expected to be arranged in May and June.

Sydney played their first pre-season match against NSW Premier League side Blacktown City Demons at Gabbie Stadium which ended in a 0–0 draw. The match was significant in which Michael Enfield played his first game in almost a season, and fellow American Matt Taylor played his first trial game for the club. Sydney lost their 2nd trial match against Sutherland a week later losing 2–1 on artificial turf. Jacob Timpano scored Sydney's goal late in the 1st half. It was his first goal for the club after almost a year and a half on the sidelines through injury. Sydney's 3rd and final Pre-season friendly ended up a 2–0 win over Manly United, with Newly signed 17yr old Chris Payne scoring the double for the Sky Blues against his former club. It is their last Pre-season friendly before starting in the annual pre-season cup which starts later this month.

== A-League Pre-Season Challenge Cup ==
Sydney have been drawn into Group B for the A-League Preseason Challenge Cup along with Queensland Roar, Central Coast Mariners and Wellington Phoenix.

=== Fixtures ===
Round 1
19 July 2008

Sydney FC	2–1	Queensland Roar
Terry McFlynn (yellow card) 17'; Chris Payne 54'; Mitchell Prentice 59'; Adam Casey (yellow card) 79'; Simon Colosimo (yellow card) 86'	(Report)	Andrew Packer (yellow card) 44'; Sergio van Dijk 49'; Hyuk-Su Seo (red card) 57'

Campbelltown Stadium, Campbelltown, NSW
Attendance: 4,222
Referee: Matthew Breeze

Round 2
19 July 2008

Central Coast Mariners	3–0	Sydney FC
David D’Apuzzo (yellow card) 32'; Andrew Clark (yellow card) 34'; Brad Porter 43' (yellow card) 70'; Sasho Petrovski (yellow card) 56' (goal) 60'; Nik Mrdja 69'	(Report)	Steve Corica (yellow card) 49'; Alex Brosque (yellow card) 63'; Iain Fyfe (yellow card) 68'; Simon Colosimo (yellow card) 74'; Chris Payne (yellow card) 77'; Dez Giraldi (yellow card) 90'

Bluetongue Stadium, Gosford, NSW
Attendance: 7,107
Referee: Chris Beath

Round 3
2 August 2008

Sydney FC	2–3	Wellington Phoenix
Alex Brosque 16' (yellow card) 69'; Iain Fyfe 36'; Dez Giraldi (yellow card) 61'; Mitchell Prentice (yellow card) 61' (red card) 91'; Ryan Walsh (yellow card) 61'	(Report)	Leo Bertos (yellow card) 24'; Andrew Durante (yellow card) 35' (yellow-red card) 91'; Troy Hearfield 57'; Shane Smeltz 62' (pen.); Adam Kwasnik (yellow card) 80'; Leilei Gao 82'

WIN Stadium, Wollongong, NSW
Attendance: 6,124
Referee: Strebre Delovski

On a freezing cold night at Campbelltown Sydney came victorious against Queensland Roar 2–1. After a scoreless 1st half, Queensland scored first through their new Dutch import, before Sydney hit back minutes later through newly signed 17-year-old Chris Payne, late in the 2nd Half Alex Brosque was fouled near the penalty area and former Perth Glory midfielder Mitchell Prentice took a shot that fired into the top right corner of the net. Sydney next travel up to Gosford To play the Central Coast Mariners.

Sydney played the Mariners up at Bluetongue Stadium on 27 July. Central Coast had recently been in the News with former Socceroos and Manchester United goalkeeper Mark Bosnich reportedly signing a 2-year contract. Sydney dominated the first 15 minutes until Brad Porter scored 2 minutes before half time. Sydney had several excellent chances early in the 2nd through Alex Brosque and Terry McFlynn but Bosnich denied any Sydney goal. 2 late goals for Central Coast through former Sydney player Sasho Petrovski and Nik Mrdja. Sydney had a 70th minute Steve Corica penalty stopped by Bosnich. Sydney now will hope to get through to the Pre-Season final with a win over Wellington Phoenix at WIN Stadium next Saturday Night.

Sydney played Wellington at WIN stadium, needing a victory and the Central Coast Mariners beating the Queensland Roar in order to get into the Pre-Season cup final. Sydney started off well with early goals from Alex Brosque and Iain Fyfe both opening up their goal tally's for the season, and Sydney looked to have the game under control by half time. Until 15 minutes into the 2nd half Wellington got a goal back through Troy Hearfield. A last-man sliding tackle by Dez Giraldi earned Wellington a Penalty, as well as Giraldi's marching orders. The penalty was converted past Sydney's 2nd keeper Ivan Necevski leveling the scores at 2–2. with 9 minutes to go till full-time a defensive mistake cost Sydney the game when Jacob Timpano but a terrible pass-back to Necevski and Wellington's Chinese import Leilei Gao intercepted it, and slotted the ball past a stunned Necevski.
Sydney now go into the start of the 4th A-League season short on players with Alex Brosque, Dez Giraldi, Mitchell Prentice, and Simon Colosimo all out on Suspension, and John Aloisi, Brendon Santalab, and Michael Enfield all injured, as well as Mark Bridge, and Stuart Musialik out on Olyroo duties for the Beijing Olympics.

== A-League ==
Sydney will again compete in the A-League competition.

=== Home-and-Away fixtures ===
Round 1

16 August 2008
19:00 UTC+10

Sydney FC	0–0	Melbourne Victory
	Report; Summary

Sydney Football Stadium
Attendance: 16,227
Referee: Mark Shield

Round 2

23 August 2008
19:00 UTC+10

Central Coast Mariners	2–3	Sydney FC
Petrovski 13' (pen.), 67'	Report Summary	Corica 6', 14'; Musialik (yellow card) 69' (yellow-red card); Cole 81'

Bluetongue Stadium
Attendance: 10,932
Referee: Ben Williams

Round 3

31 August 2008
15:00 UTC+10

Sydney FC	5–2	Perth Glory
Brosque 3'; Corica 21' (pen.); Bridge 39'; Cole 43'; Topor-Stanley 88' (o.g.)	Report; Summary	Dadi 12', 67' (pen.); Djulbic (yellow card) 20' (red card) 20'

Sydney Football Stadium
Attendance: 11,732
Referee: Peter Green

Round 4

13 September 2008
19:00 UTC+10

Newcastle Jets	0–0	Sydney FC
	Report; Summary	Prentice (yellow card) 83' (yellow-red card) 87'

EnergyAustralia Stadium
Attendance: 11,535
Referee: Peter O’Leary

Round 5

20 September 2008
17:00 UTC+10

Sydney FC	3–0	Adelaide United
McFlynn 2'; Brosque 34'; Santalab 79'	Report; Summary

Sydney Football Stadium
Attendance: 12,462
Referee: Ben Williams

Round 6

28 September 2008
17:00 UTC+12

Wellington Phoenix	2–1	Sydney FC
Smeltz 42'; Brown 76'	Report; Summary	Brosque 20'

Westpac Stadium
Attendance: 6,729
Referee: Chris Beath

Round 7

4 October 2008
19:00 UTC+10

Sydney FC	1–1	Queensland Roar
Musialik 90+3'	Report; Summary	Miller 49'

Sydney Football Stadium
Attendance: 12,403
Referee: Matthew Breeze

Round 8

19 October 2008
14:00 UTC+8

Perth Glory	2–1	Sydney FC
Harnwell 5', 47'	Report; Summary	Santalab 11'; Fyfe (red card) 90+1'

Members Equity Stadium
Attendance: 7,759
Referee: Peter O’Leary

Round 9

25 October 2008
19:00 UTC+11

Melbourne Victory	0–1	Sydney FC
	Report; Summary	Bridge 20'

Telstra Dome
Attendance: 31,564
Referee: Ben Williams

Round 10

1 November 2008
19:00 UTC+11

Sydney FC	3–3	Central Coast Mariners
Bridge 28'; Casey 39'; McFlynn 57'	Report; Summary	Simon 63', 81'; Mrdja 78'

Sydney Football Stadium
Attendance: 18,251
Referee: Srebre Delovski

Round 11

7 November 2008
20:00 UTC+11

Sydney FC	1–2	Wellington Phoenix
Musialik 77'	Report; Summary	Bertos 34'; Smeltz 89' (pen.)

Sydney Football Stadium
Attendance: 12,856
Referee: Craig Zetter

Round 12

22 November 2008
18:30 UTC+10:30

Adelaide United	2–0	Sydney FC
Ognenovski 45+2'; T. Dodd 78'	Report; Summary	McFlynn (yellow card) 29' (red card) 61'

Hindmarsh Stadium
Attendance: 9,509
Referee: Ben Williams

Round 13

28 November 2008
20:00 UTC+10

Sydney FC	1–1	Queensland Roar
Corica 64'	Report; Summary	McKay 12'

Sydney Football Stadium
Attendance: 8,502
Referee: Matthew Breeze

Round 14

7 December 2008
17:00 UTC+11

Newcastle Jets	1–2	Sydney FC
Wheelhouse 11'	Report; Summary	Fyfe 15'; Gan 78'

EnergyAustralia Stadium
Attendance: 7,872
Referee: Srebre Delovski

Round 15

13 December 2008
19:00 UTC+11

Central Coast Mariners	2–1	Sydney FC
Macallister 11'; Jedinak 90+1' (pen.)	Report; Summary	Aloisi 65' (pen.)

Bluetongue Stadium
Attendance: 11,220
Referee: Peter Green

Round 16

21 December 2008
17:00 UTC+11

Sydney FC	1–4	Perth Glory
Musialik 61'	Report; Summary	Pellegrino 11'; Golec 36' (o.g.); Srhoj 49'; Middleby 69' (o.g.)

Sydney Football Stadium
Attendance: 12,165
Referee: Ben Williams

Round 17

27 December 2008
19:00 UTC+11

Melbourne Victory	3–2	Sydney FC
Thompson 14'; Ward 71'; Ney Fabiano 80'	Report; Summary	Cole 1'; Gan 4'

Telstra Dome
Attendance: 25,398
Referee: Matthew Breeze

Round 18

3 January 2009
19:30 UTC+10:30

Adelaide United	2–0	Sydney FC
Cássio 45+1'; Alemão 83'	Report; Summary	Jurman (red card) 90+3'

Adelaide Oval
Attendance: 23,002
Referee: Chris Beath

Round 19

11 January 2009
18:00 UTC+11

Sydney FC	1–0	Wellington Phoenix
Danning 85'	Summary	Hearfield (red card) 64'

Sydney Football Stadium
Attendance: 9,605
Referee: Ben Williams

Round 20

17 January 2009
19:00 UTC+10

Queensland Roar	3–1	Sydney FC
Van Dijk 16', 28', 90+3'	Summary	Danning 25'; Cairncross (red card) 87'

Suncorp Stadium
Attendance: 19,111
Referee: Craig Zetter

Round 21

25 January 2009
17:00 UTC+11

Sydney FC	4–0	Newcastle Jets
Brosque 13', 41'; Milligan 77' (o.g.); Bridge 86'	Report; Summary

Sydney Football Stadium
Attendance: 9,551
Referee: Kevin Docherty

== Player details ==
=== Scorers ===
Total	Player		Goals per Round																				
Total	Player		1	2	3	4	5	6	7	8	9	10	11	12	13	14	15	16	17	18	19	20	21
5	(Australia)	Alex Brosque			1		1	1															2
4	(Australia)	Mark Bridge			1						1	1											1
4	(Australia)	Steve Corica		2	1										1								
3	(Australia)	Shannon Cole		1	1														1				
3	(Australia)	Stuart Musialik							1				1					1					
2	(Australia)	John Aloisi									1						1						
2	(Australia)	Kofi Danning																			1	1	
2	(Australia)	Brendan Gan														1			1				
2	(Australia)	Brendon Santalab					1			1													
2	(Northern Ireland)	Terry McFlynn					1					1											
1	(Australia)	Adam Casey										1											
1	(Australia)	Iain Fyfe														1							

A goal was scored from a penalty kick
Two goals were scored from penalty kicks

=== Transfers ===
The later parts of the 2007–08 season saw the departure of Mark Rudan to Japanese second division side Avispa Fukuoka and the club released David Zdrilic, Ruben Zadkovich and Patrick da Silva at season's end. Ufuk Talay joined his former teammate Mark Rudan and coach Pierre Littbarski at Avispa Fukuoka the end of the season.

New signings for the 2008–09 season started in earnest in March with the official announcements of Simon Colosimo from Perth, Mark Bridge and Stuart Musialik from Jets and a new marquee player in John Aloisi from the Mariners reportedly with a pay packet of up to A$1.4m a season. With Aloisi joining as the marquee and other signings being under the salary cap, Sydney were unable to retain Brazilian Juninho at the club and he was unceremoniously released during the off-season. Ruben Zadkovich was snatched up by Newcastle but ended up heading over to England on a reported 2-year contract with relegated Premier League team Derby County. Manly United young gun Chris Payne caught Kosmina's eye during a pre-season trial and signed the youngster on a 2-year youth contract. And in mid-July Kosmina signed Wollongong Wolves striker Dez Giraldi on an 8-week loan spell to replace the injured Brendon Santalab.

==== In ====
Player	From	League	Fee	Date
(Australia) Simon Colosimo	Perth Glory (released)	(Australia) A-League	Free	3 March 2008
(Australia) Mark Bridge	Newcastle United Jets FC	(Australia) A-League	Free	3 March 2008
(Australia) John Aloisi	Central Coast Mariners	(Australia) A-League	Free	3 March 2008
(Australia) Stuart Musialik	Newcastle United Jets	(Australia) A-League	Free	11 March 2008
(Australia) Mitchell Prentice	Perth Glory (released)	(Australia) A-League	Free	3 May 2008
(Australia) Chris Payne	Manly United	(Australia) NSW Premier League	$3000	20 May 2008
(Australia) Shannon Cole	Sydney Olympic	(Australia) NSW Premier League	Free	14 August 2008

==== Out ====
Player	To	League	Fee	Date
(Australia) Ufuk Talay	Avispa Fukuoka	(Japan) J.League 2nd Division	Free	12 February 2008
(Australia) Ruben Zadkovich	Derby County (released)	(England) Premier League	–	3 March 2008
(Australia) David Zdrilić	Released	–	–	3 March 2008
(Brazil) Patrick da Silva	Released	–	–	3 March 2008
(Australia) Ben Vidaic	Sydney United	(Australia) NSW Premier League	Free	18 March 2008
(Brazil) Juninho Paulista	Released	–	–	12 April 2008
(Australia) Mark Milligan	Released	–	–	28 April 2008

==== Short-term signings ====
Player	Team	Start Date	End Date	Reason
(United States) Matt Taylor	Hollywood United F.C.	26 June 2008	3 July 2008	Trial
(Australia) Dez Giraldi	Wollongong FC	25 July 2008	29 September 2008	On loan to replace Injured Brendon Santalab
(Australia) Ryan Walsh	Blacktown City Demons	14 August 2008	21 August 2008	Suspension Replacement
(Australia) John Filan	Wigan Athletic	28 August 2008	1 November 2008	Suspension Replacement
(Netherlands) Bobby Petta	Para Hills Knights	25 October 2008		On loan to replace Injured Michael Enfield
(Australia) Beau Busch	Manly United	25 October 2008		Suspension Replacement

==== Loan out ====
Player	Team	League	Start Date	End Date
(Australia) Adam Biddle	Blacktown City Demons	(Australia) NSW Premier League	1 March 2008	26 April 2008
(Australia) Ivan Necevski	Blacktown City Demons	(Australia) NSW Premier League	1 March 2008	26 April 2008
(Australia) Nikolas Tsattalios	Penrith Nepean United	(Australia) NSW Premier League	1 March 2008	26 April 2008
(Australia) Ben Vidaic	Sydney United	(Australia) NSW Premier League	1 March 2008	18 March 2008
