= Adam Biddle =

Adam Biddle may refer to:

- Adam Biddle (cinematographer), English cinematographer
- Adam Biddle (soccer) (born 1988), Australian football (soccer) player
