= Alex Mullen (soccer) =

Australian soccer player

Personal information
- Full name: Alexander Mullen
- Date of birth: 13 June 1992 (age 34)
- Place of birth: Adelaide, Australia
- Height: 1.83 m (6 ft 0 in)
- Position: Midfielder

Team information
- Current team: Campbelltown City
- Number: 8

Youth career
- Modbury Vista

College career
Years	Team	Apps	(Gls)
2011–2015	Mars Hill University		

Senior career*
Years	Team	Apps	(Gls)
2008–2009	SASI	32	(9)
2010–2015	Para Hills	74	(22)
2015–2016	Sydney FC	1	(0)
2017	Para Hills	23	(13)
2018–	Campbelltown City	164	(70)
- * Club domestic league appearances and goals as of 9 September 2024 ‡ National team caps and goals as of 17 February 2017

Alexander Mullen (born 13 June 1992) is an Australian semi-professional soccer player who plays as a midfielder for Campbelltown City.

== Personal life ==
Mullen is the brother of Matthew, cousin of former Newcastle Jets player Daniel Mullen and the nephew of Joe Mullen, a former Socceroo.

== Club career ==
=== Sydney FC ===
Sydney FC signed Mullen on a one-year deal as a mature age rookie ahead of the 2015–16 season after trialling him in the pre-season.

On 16 March 2016, Mullen debuted for Sydney FC in their AFC Champions League campaign coming on as a substitute for George Blackwood late in the match.

Mullen made his A-League debut for Sydney FC in their round 26 match against Adelaide United on 2 April 2016.

After a season where he played one league match, and was twice subbed on in the AFC Champions League, Mullen was not offered a new contract.

== See also ==
- List of association football families
- List of Sydney FC players (fewer than 25 appearances)
