= Mitchell Glasson =

Australian soccer player

Personal information
- Full name: Mitchell John Glasson
- Date of birth: 4 May 2006 (age 20)
- Place of birth: Liverpool, Australia
- Position: Forward

Team information
- Current team: Marconi Stallions

Youth career
- Liverpool Rangers
- –2018: Sydney Juniors FC
- 2019–2021: Southern Districts Raiders
- 2022–: Sydney FC

Senior career*
Years	Team	Apps	(Gls)
2023–	Sydney FC NPL	25	(8)
2023–	Sydney FC	15	(0)
2025	→ KTP (loan)	27	(2)
2026	→ Marconi Stallions (loan)	0	(0)

International career^{‡}
2022–	Australia U17	9	(7)
- * Club domestic league appearances and goals as of 17 September 2026 ‡ National team caps and goals as of 2 July 2023

Mitchell Glasson (born 4 May 2006) is an Australian professional football player who plays as a forward for Australian Championship club Marconi Stallions, on loan from Sydney FC.

== Early life ==
Glasson was born on 4 May 2006 in Liverpool, New South Wales to Kelly and Steve Glasson. His father hailed from Sydney and was a former world champion and world no. 1 in lawn bowls. His older brother, Ben, is also a bowls player. Prior to his birth, his parents resided in Campbelltown, although his father occasionally travelled to Parramatta for work. Glasson piqued interest in football at an early age and began playing at the age of five with local clubs Liverpool Rangers and Sydney Juniors.

== Club career ==
=== Sydney FC ===
Glasson began his football career at Southern Districts Raiders before being scouted and signed by Sydney FC Youth. He achieved the Sydney FC Rising Star Award during his time with the senior youth squad. He notably scored the winner, and only goal, in a league victory over Sydney United 58 on 21 March 2023.

Glasson signed his first professional contract with Sydney FC on a three-year deal on 6 July 2023. He made his first-team debut as a substitute on 13 August 2023 in an Australia Cup tie against Central Coast Mariners. He scored the fifth penalty for Sydney FC in a 10–9 penalty shootout to defeat the Mariners. Glasson made his A-League Men debut on 21 October 2023 in a 2–0 Big Blue defeat to Melbourne Victory. Coming off the bench, which featured entirely of Sydney FC Academy products for the first time in club history.

==== KTP (loan) ====
On 5 January 2025, KTP of Finnish Veikkausliiga announced the signing of Glasson on a loan deal for the 2025 season.

== International career ==
On 1 October 2022, Glasson received his first call-up to the Australian under-17 squad ahead of the AFC U-17 Asian Cup qualifiers. He scored four goals on his debut for Australia in a 23–0 win over Northern Mariana Islands, and scored again in a 10–0 win over Cambodia just two days later.

== Career statistics ==
As of 31 December 2025

Appearances and goals by club, season and competition
Club	Season	League			Cup (Note: Includes Australia Cup and Suomen Cup)		League cup (Note: Includes Finnish League Cup)		Continental		Total	
Club	Season	Division	Apps	Goals	Apps	Goals	Apps	Goals	Apps	Goals	Apps	Goals
Sydney FC II	2023	NPL NSW	15	4	–		–		–		15	4
Sydney FC II	2024	NPL NSW	10	4	–		–		–		10	4
Sydney FC II	Total		25	8	0	0	0	0	0	0	25	8
Sydney FC	2023–24	A-League Men	15	0	3	0	–		–		18	0
Sydney FC	2024–25	A-League Men	0	0	1	0	–		1 (Note: Appearance(s) in AFC Champions League Two)	0	2	0
Sydney FC	2025–26	A-League Men	0	0	0	0	–		–		0	0
Sydney FC	Total		15	0	4	0	0	0	1	0	20	0
KTP (loan)	2025	Veikkausliiga	27	2	2	2	5	1	–		34	5
Career total			67	10	6	2	5	1	1	0	79	21
