= Ben Vidaic =

Australian soccer player (born 1988)

Personal information
- Full name: Benjamin Vidaic
- Date of birth: 29 January 1988 (age 38)
- Place of birth: Sydney, Australia
- Height: 1.93 m (6 ft 4 in)
- Position: Striker

Senior career*
Years	Team	Apps	(Gls)
2006–2007	Sydney United	28	(16)
2007–2008	Sydney FC	2	(0)
2008	→ Sydney United (loan)	17	(5)
2009	Marconi Stallions	19	(3)
2010	Sutherland Sharks	13	(4)
2011–2012	Sydney United	31	(9)
2013–2014	Fraser Park	34	(11)
2015	Eastern Suburbs	2	(2)
2016–2017	Fraser Park	39	(29)
2018	Dulwich Hill	13	(9)

International career^{‡}
2004	Australia U-17	5	(5)
2006	Australia U-20	3	(0)
- * Club domestic league appearances and goals as of 26 November 2020 ‡ National team caps and goals as of 4 September 2007

Benjamin Vidaic (born 29 January 1988) is an Australian former soccer player who played as a Striker.

== Early life ==
Vidaic grew up playing for Menai Hawks in the Sutherland Shire, before representing Sutherland Sharks in the Representative Youth league.

After being selected for the NSW Metro State team, Vidaic then spent 2 years at the NSW Institute of Sport (NSWIS).

Vidaic also represented Australia internationally at youth level, playing for the Qantas Joeys (Under 17s) and Qantas Young Socceroos (Under 20s), scoring five goals in eight appearances.

He is of Croat origin, and attended the Trinity Grammar School in Summer Hill where he was Captain of Soccer.

== Club career ==
In 2004, Ben spent 6 weeks training with Middlesbrough FC as a 16 year old after winning a Big Brother scholarship, before returning to Australia and signing with Sydney United in the NSW NPL at the end of 2005.

In July 2007, Ben began trialling at Sydney FC as the club began pre-season training. After scoring in friendly against Sydney University and making a number of substitute appearances in Pre-Season Cup matches, the club signed him to a two-year contract. Former Sydney FC coach Branko Culina declared that "Ben has great potential and I'm confident he'll push for a place in the team,". Upon signing, Ben commented that "It's a dream come true to sign with Sydney FC, the best club in the A-League," said the youngster. Vidaic made two appearances in the A-League in his first season, both off the bench.

On 27 November 2007, Vidaic took part in an exhibition match against Los Angeles Galaxy, coming off the bench early in the second half. He also played for the club in the Pan-Pacific Championship 2008 in Hawaii.

It was announced at the end of the season that he would return to Sydney United on loan while the A-League was in off-season and return to the club for pre-season training in April. However, on 18 March 2008, his contract with Sydney FC was terminated by mutual consent, making his move to United permanent.

Ben's father, Bruno Vidaic, also played for Sydney United (formerly Sydney Croatia) captaining the club in the 80's and is considered a club great.
