= Patrick (footballer, born 1985) =

Brazilian footballer

Personal information
- Full name: Patrick Roberto Daniel Da Silva
- Date of birth: 26 December 1985 (age 40)
- Place of birth: São Paulo, Brazil
- Height: 1.85 m (6 ft 1 in)
- Position: Striker

Team information
- Current team: Karketu Dili

Youth career
- 1998–1999: Portuguesa
- 1999–2003: São Paulo

Senior career*
Years	Team	Apps	(Gls)
2002–2005	Vitória		
2005	Altamira		
2005–2006	Mogi Mirim		
2006–2007	Grêmio Barueri		
2007	Nacional		
2007–2008	Sydney FC	8	(2)
2009–2011	América de Natal		
2012	São Bento	0	(0)
2012	Osvaldo Cruz		
2012–2013	DPMM	10	(4)
2013–2014	Saham		
2014–2015	Krabi		
2015	Thanh Hóa	9	(2)
2016	Persija Jakarta	0	(0)
2016–2017	Gresik United	40	(15)
2018	Barito Putera	12	(7)
2021–2022	Karketu Dili		
- * Club domestic league appearances and goals

Patrick Roberto Daniel da Silva or commonly known as Patrick (born 26 March 1985) is a Brazilian former footballer who played as a striker.

== Career ==
Patrick played in the youth academies of Portuguesa and São Paulo before he began his professional career in 2003 with Vitória. In the summer of 2004, he moved to Mexican club Altamira, but returned to Brazil in early 2005 and first played for Mogi Mirim. In the course of the year, he moved to Grêmio Barueri and played there until 2007. After a short stay at Nacional, he moved to the Australian A-League for Sydney FC in August 2007.

At Sydney, Patrick played alongside his compatriot Juninho Paulista and scored two goals in eight appearances under manager Branko Čulina at the start of the season. After Čulina's dismissal in October 2007, he lost his position in the team under his successor John Kosmina and only made a brief appearance in the play-off semifinals against Queensland Roar in late January 2008. His contract was not renewed at the end of the season and Patrick continued his career with América de Natal in 2009. Later, he played at various clubs in Asia followed, such as DPMM, Krabi, Thanh Hóa, Persija Jakarta, Barito Putera among others.

On 9 November 2021, Patrick made his comeback after more than three years without a club, lacing his boots for Liga Futebol Timor-Leste club Karketu Dili. Undefeated after six matches, Karketu Dili won the 2021 Liga Futebol Amadora.
