= Brendan Renaud =

Australian soccer player

Personal information
- Full name: Brendan Renaud
- Date of birth: 21 August 1973 (age 53)
- Place of birth: Australia
- Positions: Left back; left midfielder

Senior career*
Years	Team	Apps	(Gls)
1994–1995	Parramatta Eagles	19	(2)
1995–2002	Marconi-Fairfield	161	(10)
2002–2003	Parramatta Power	32	(3)
2003–2004	Marconi Stallions	23	(0)
2004–2005	St George		
2007	Blacktown City		
2007–2008	Sydney FC	8	(1)
2008	Blacktown City		
- * Club domestic league appearances and goals as of 22 September 2012

Brendan Renaud (born 21 August 1973) is an Australian footballer.

== Biography ==
He made his debut for Sydney FC coming on in the second half against Adelaide United FC which Sydney won 3-1. He has previously played for Blacktown City, Marconi and Parramatta Power. He signed a short-term contract with Sydney FC in 2007 to help with cover in defense due to injuries to starting players, at the time he was part of the Sydney FC Coaching and Development staff in the role of Development Officer.

Brendan scored his first goal for Sydney during the Pan-Pacific Championship against their 3/4 play-offs against Los Angeles Galaxy. After some excellent build up play, he took a shot that fired into the top right corner from around 30 yards out, The world class strike was not enough to save Sydney who went down 2-1. Renaud is rumoured to be considering or have already retired from professional football, but still works for Sydney FC as a Development officer.
