= Michael Enfield =

American soccer player

Personal information
- Full name: Michael David Enfield
- Date of birth: July 19, 1983 (age 43)
- Place of birth: Ventura, California, United States
- Height: 5 ft 9 in (1.75 m)
- Position: Attacking midfielder

Team information
- Current team: SP Barcelona

Youth career
- 2001–2004: UCLA Bruins

Senior career*
Years	Team	Apps	(Gls)
2004	Orange County Blue Star	6	(2)
2005–2006	Los Angeles Galaxy	11	(1)
2007–2009	Sydney FC	1	(0)
2010	Ventura County Fusion	8	(0)
2011–	SP Barcelona		
Medal record
Representing United States
Football
Maccabiah Games
Silver medal – second place	2005 Maccabiah	Football
- * Club domestic league appearances and goals as of May 3, 2012

Michael Enfield (born July 19, 1983, in Ventura, California) is an American soccer player currently playing for SP Barcelona in La Gran Liga de Oxnard. He is a member of the United States national beach soccer team.

== Career ==
=== College and amateur ===
Enfield attended Ventura High School, and played college soccer at the University of California, Los Angeles for four seasons, from 2001 to 2004. He appeared in seventy-eight games for the Bruins, scoring thirty-nine goals and assisting on fifteen.

During his college years he also played for Orange County Blue Star in the USL Premier Development League.

=== Professional ===
Enfield was drafted in the second round, fifteenth overall, by Los Angeles Galaxy in the 2005 MLS SuperDraft, and played in eleven games for the team, scoring one goal, before being waived at the end of the season.

Enfield trialled with Australian side Sydney FC, throughout the second half of March 2007, and played two forty-five-minute halves in trial games, scoring against the Wollongong Wolves in a 3–2 victory, and then having a hand in all three goals as Sydney beat the Marconi Stallions 3–0. On April 7, 2007, Enfield signed a two-year contract with the former A-League champions.

He made his debut for the club on September 9, 2007, against Perth Glory FC, coming on as a second-half substitute and becoming the first Jewish player in A-League history.

In late September, he suffered a serious injury to his left knee during training which ended his season. Enfield underwent knee reconstruction surgery to repair tearing to both the anterior cruciate and medial collateral ligaments, and was expected to return to training at Sydney in mid-2008. However, Enfield suffered another major setback when an arthroscope test showed he still had cartilage damage. Enfield missed the start of Sydney's 2008–2009 season and, due to his extensive injury issues, he was released at the end of the season.

Enfield returned to his native California in 2010 and subsequently signed to play with Ventura County Fusion in the USL Premier Development League. Recently, Enfield has been playing with the amateur side SP Barcelona in the USASA-affiliated La Gran Liga de Oxnard based in Oxnard, California.

== Personal life ==
While living in Sydney and not playing due to injury, Enfield carried out a great deal of community work on behalf of Sydney FC. Enfield currently is the Assistant coach to the Men's Soccer team at Santa Monica College. Enfield is the grandson of actors Craig Reynolds (born Harold Hugh Enfield) and Barbara Pepper.

== Honors ==
On June 26, 2011, he was inducted into the Southern California Jewish Sports Hall of Fame.

=== Los Angeles Galaxy ===
- Major League Soccer MLS Cup (1): 2005
