= Adam Biddle (soccer) =

Australian association footballer

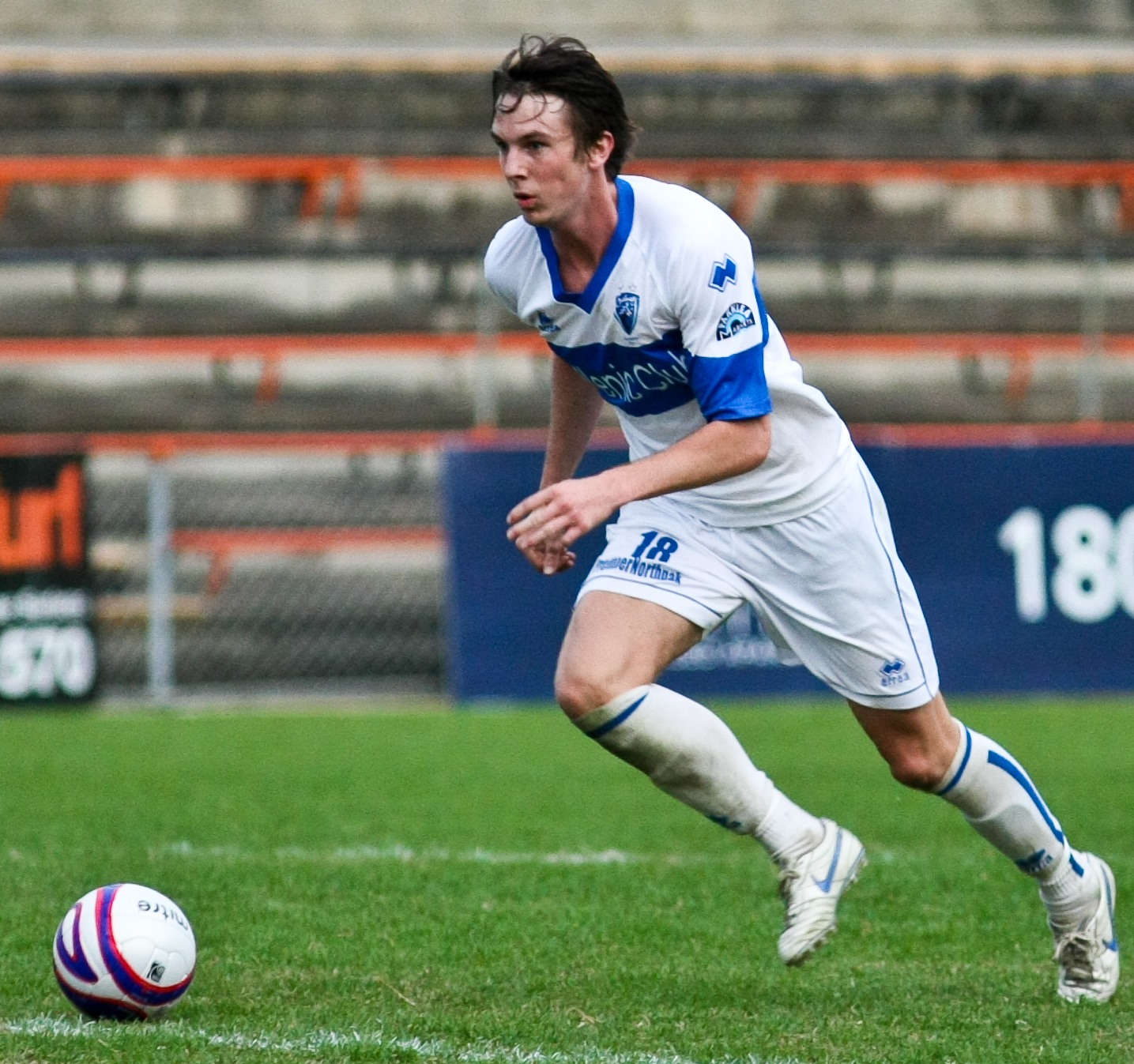
- Biddle playing for Sydney Olympic in 2009

Personal information
- Full name: Adam Biddle
- Date of birth: 27 July 1988 (age 38)
- Place of birth: Sydney, Australia
- Height: 1.87 m (6 ft 2 in)
- Position: Centre back

Team information
- Current team: Noosa Lions

Youth career
- 1994–1997: Macquarie Dragons
- 1997–1999: North Epping Rangers
- 1999–2003: Northern Spirit FC
- 2004–2005: Parramatta Eagles

Senior career*
Years	Team	Apps	(Gls)
2005–2006	Blacktown City Demons		
2006–2008	Sydney FC	14	(45)
2007	→ Blacktown City Demons (loan)	9	(1)
2008–2009	Sydney Olympic FC	18	(3)
2010–2011	Blacktown City Demons		
2012	Northern Tigers FC		
2013	Central Coast Mariners Academy	3	(0)
2014	Bankstown City	6	(3)
2015–2016	Kenthurst & District		
2017	Kemblawarra Fury		(1)
2018–	Noosa Lions		
- * Club domestic league appearances and goals as of 19 January 2020

Adam Biddle (born 27 July 1988 in Sydney, Australia) is a former Australian footballer who played for Sydney FC and Bankstown City.

== Biography ==
Biddle was educated at Saint Ignatius' College, Riverview.

=== Club career ===
When part of the Parramatta-Melita Eagles, he was awarded the chance to trial with Manchester United. He has also had spells with a number of NSW State squads over the years. Biddle later joined Blacktown City Demons at the age of 17, and was part of the 2006 squad that won the Johnny Warren Cup and the 2007 New South Wales Premier League.

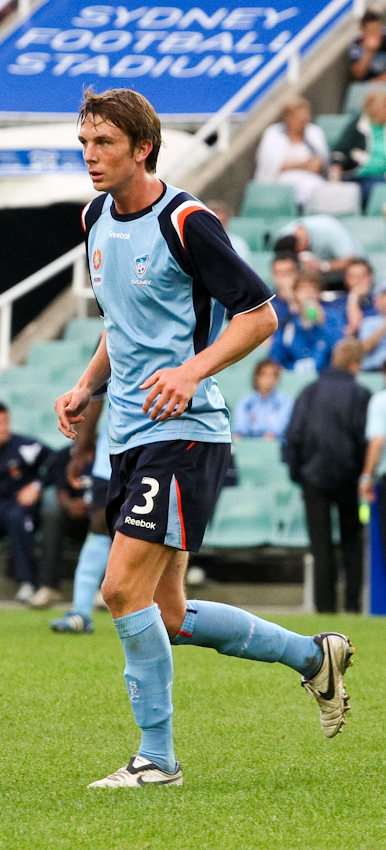
Adam Biddle playing for the Sydney FC Youth team

Impressive form for New South Wales Premier League side Blacktown City Demons earned him much praise, and after trialling amongst several other players, was signed on a 2-year deal by manager Branko Culina as one of three Under-20 players required by each A-League club.

Biddle made his debut for Sydney FC against the Central Coast Mariners in the opening game of the season on 24 August 2007; but was given few opportunities under Culina. Under new manager John Kosmina, Biddle played his first full game for the club in the Los Angeles Galaxy exhibition match at Telstra Stadium on 27 November, and shot to fame for retaliating, when he was stomped on by Galaxy defender Kevin Harmse. Only weeks later, playing the club he debuted against, Biddle showed moments of brilliance and scored his first ever goal for Sydney FC to level the scores 3–3, on the way to the famous 5–4 victory over the Central Coast Mariners at Bluetongue Stadium in Gosford.

In his debut season (2007/08) with the club, Biddle started two games, appeared as a substitute on ten more occasions, featured in other trial and exhibition matches, as well as the inaugural Pan-Pacific Championships in Hawaii and won the Sydney FC Young Player of the Year award.

Sydney FC opted to release Biddle after the 2008/2009 season, and in February 2009 he joined Sydney Olympic FC. In April 2009, Biddle accepted an offer at FF Jaro in Finland, but the move was blocked at the last hour by the Sydney Olympic board.

Biddle suffered from injury throughout the 2010 and 2011 seasons. He took long leave in an effort to fully rest the injury problems, and later signed with Northern Tigers FC for the 2012 season. He signed with Central Coast Mariners Academy in 2013 and after a string of injuries and surgeries he took time off from football, focusing on establishing his landscaping company in Noosa, QLD with his partner Hannah Erken. In 2018 Biddle signed with Noosa Lions FC and again for the 2020 season.
