= Branko Culina =

Football coach (born 1957)

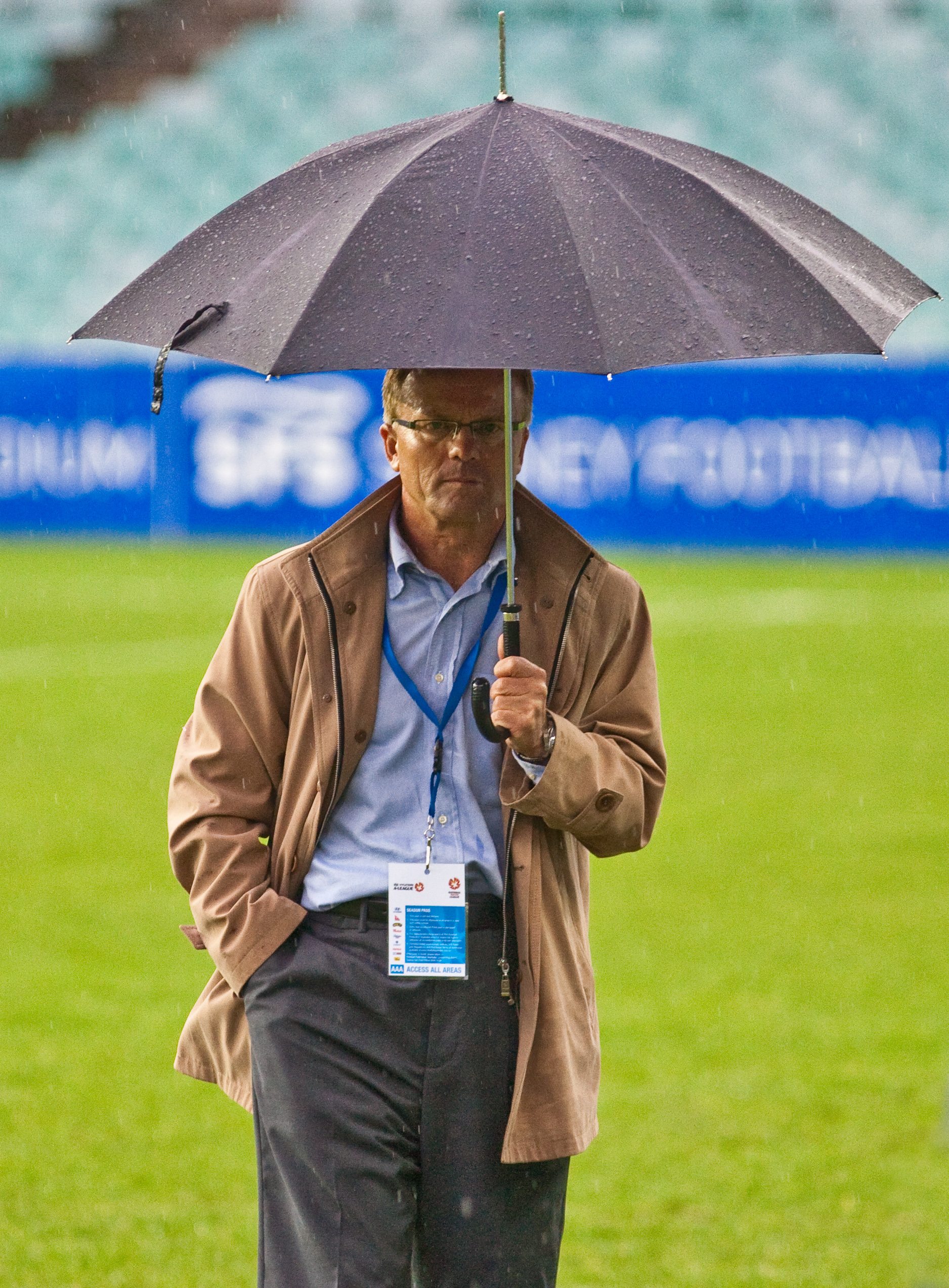

Personal information
- Date of birth: 1 October 1957 (age 69)
- Place of birth: Zadar, SFR Yugoslavia
- Position: Midfielder

Senior career*
Years	Team	Apps	(Gls)
1972–1974	St Albans SC		
1975–1980	Essendon Croatia		
1980	Sydney Croatia		
1981	Blacktown City Demons		
1982–1989	St Albans Dinamo		

Managerial career
- 1989: St Albans Dinamo
- 1990–1992: North Geelong Croatia
- 1992–1993: Melbourne Knights
- 1994: Fawkner Blues
- 1994: St Albans Saints
- 1994–1997: Sydney United
- 1997–1998: Canberra Cosmos
- 1998–2001: Sydney Olympic
- 2001–2003: Sydney United
- 2007: Sydney FC
- 2009–2011: Newcastle Jets
- 2012–2015: Rockdale City Suns
- 2016–2017: Fraser Park
- 2018: Canterbury Bankstown
- 2019: St George City
- * Club domestic league appearances and goals

Branko Culina (Croatian pronunciation: [ˈtʃulina]; born 1 October 1957) is a soccer coach and former player. He previously managed Sydney FC and the Newcastle Jets in the A-League.

== Playing career ==
Culina was born in Zadar, Socialist Republic of Croatia, FPR Yugoslavia and emigrated to Australia with his mother in 1968, at the age of 10, settling in Melbourne's Croatian community. His senior playing career began with St. Albans Saints where he captained the senior team at the age of 15. In 1974, he transferred to Essendon Croatia, he had seven successful years at the club which included winning the Victorian State Championship in 1978 and the Victorian treble (State Champions, Dockerty Cup and the State League Cup) in 1979.

In 1980, he joined sister club Sydney Croatia before moving to National Soccer League club Blacktown City Demons. After a season at each he returned to Melbourne with St Albans Saints, where he remained until retiring 1988.

== Managerial career ==
After retiring as a player he stayed with St Albans as a coach in the Victorian Premier League for the 1989 season before taking up a role at North Geelong. At North Geelong, Culina lead the side to the 1990 Division One title leading to promotion to the VPL. He then won the VPL with North Geelong at the first go in 1991, beating Brunswick Juventus in the Grand Final at Middle Park. In 1992, he returned to the NSL at Melbourne Knights,

=== Sydney United ===
Culina returned to the NSL at Sydney United for the 1994–95 season. His three seasons at United would be his most successful to date, winning the minor premiership and reaching the competition Grand Final in the 1996–97 season, as well as winning the Waratah Cup in 1995 and 1996. Overall, he coached 133 games for Sydney United, with 62 wins, 32 draws, and 39 losses, including an Australian record of 8 consecutive victories.

During this time he was also coach to his teenage son Jason Culina who was breaking into the Sydney United first team. While some accusations of nepotism floated around Branko has said he 'didn't have to do [Jason] any favours because he didn't need any', perhaps evidenced best by Jason's later success as a Socceroo.

After his successful 1996–97 season, he was signed with great promise to take over Sydney Olympic. Over three seasons, he would become Olympic's longest serving coach, narrowly missing out on a finals place in his first year before pushing the team into the finals in both 1999-00 and 2000–01 NSL seasons.

In 2001, he returned to Sydney United, however the club was now less of a force in the national league. Following the demise of the NSL, Culina had been working as Technical director for the state governing body Soccer NSW, which included a coaching role in 2005 for the NSW State Representative Team.

=== Sydney FC ===
In 2007, he returned to coaching at A-League club Sydney FC. Sydney had accepted the resignation of former coach Terry Butcher at the close of a disappointing 2006–07 season, and on 13 February 2007 appointed Culina in an interim role, for initially six months, to guide the club in its first Asian Champions League campaign. Culina then led Sydney FC to five wins in eight games, including a historic 2–1 away win against Shanghai Shenhua – the first-ever victory recorded by an Australian club in the AFC Champions League. On 23 April 2007 he was confirmed as Sydney's permanent coach with a two-year contract.

Despite the initial success with his new club, Culina found the A-Leagues 2007–08 season tough going. Highly inconsistent performance and an inability to win against teams both at the top and bottom end of the league table meant that Culina's Sydney found itself halfway through the competition in Round 9 with only two victories. after a 0–1 loss at home to Adelaide United, Culina was dismissed from his position with the club.

During a Round 7 clash between Sydney FC vs Melbourne Victory, he made controversial remarks about referee Mark Shield, claiming that: "If the police need to escort you, it's not a good sign." "Don't ask me about the referee, I can't afford the fine … however, if the referee needs to be escorted by police after the game, you make your own mind up whether he's had a good game or bad game."

=== Newcastle United Jets ===
Culina was named as the manager of Newcastle United Jets FC from the start of the A-League 2009-10 season and given a two-year contract. He was previously working for the Jets as the Technical Director., Culina played an attractive brand of football.

Newcastle made it the finals series, losing to Wellington Phoenix. Branko was fined $3000, for using the word "shit" in a post-match press conference. After the takeover of the club by Nathan Tinkler, Culina signed with the club until 2015. On 4 October 2011, just four days out from the season opener, it was announced that Culina had been sacked as coach of the Newcastle Jets.

=== Rockdale City Suns ===
On 19 October 2012, Branko Culina was appointed the new manager and director of football of National Premier Leagues NSW club Rockdale City Suns.

In his first season in charge of the side, Culina lead Rockdale to a 4th placed NSW Premier League finish, and all the way to the Grand Final after defeating Marconi Stallions, Sutherland Sharks and Sydney United 58 FC, but lost by 1–0 to Bonnyrigg White Eagles FC in front of around 5,000 people.

== Personal life ==
Branko and his wife Nada have two sons, former Olyroo Dean Culina and past Socceroo Jason Culina. Branko is a football analyst for SBS and Fox Sports.currently ABC TV Grandstand.

== Managerial statistics ==
Team	Nat	From	To	Record				
Team	Nat	From	To	G	W	D	L	Win %
Sydney FC	(Australia)	February 2007	October 2007	19	6	8	5	31.58
Newcastle Jets	(Australia)	30 June 2009	4 October 2011	66	23	13	30	34.85
Total				85	29	21	35	34.12

== Honours ==
=== Player ===
Melbourne Knights

- Victorian State Championship: 1978, 1979
- Victorian State League Cup: 1979
- Dockerty Cup: 1979

Personal honours

- Victorian Premier League Player of the Year: 1985 with St Albans Saints

=== Manager ===
Sydney United

- NSL Championship: 1996–1997
- Waratah Cup: 1995, 1996

North Geelong Warriors

- Victorian Division 1: 1991 championship winners
- Victorian Premier League: 1992 Premiership, 1992 Championship

+ Sydney fc - Group Stage Runners up -Asian Champions League 2007

+ Newcastle Jets - Semi Finalist 2009

+ Rockdale City + Grand Final 2013 +Pre-Season Cup 2014 + Semi Finalist 2014

Personal honours

- Victorian Coach of the year 1992
- NSL Coach of the Year: 1996–1997 with Sydney United
