= York (surname) =

York and Yorke are surnames and may refer to:

== York ==
- Alexander M. York (1838–1928), American politician
- Alissa York (born 1970), Canadian writer
- Alvin C. York (1887–1964), American war hero
- Andrew York (born 1958), American guitarist
- Andy York (1894–1977), British football player
- Byron York (born 1958), American author and journalist
- Cade York (born 2001), American football player
- Cam York (born 2001), American ice hockey player
- Carol Beach York (1928–2013), American children's author
- Christian York (born 1977), American professional wrestler
- Chris York (born 1989), English rugby union player
- Christopher York (1909–1999), British politician
- Colin York (1904–1973), Australian rugby league player
- Deborah York (born 1964), British singer
- Dick York (1928–1992), American actor
- Dolores Crow (née York; 1931–2018), American legislator
- Dwight York (born 1945), American criminal, author and musician
- Dwight York, stand-up comedian
- Dwight A. York (born 1939), Wisconsin politician
- Ernest York (died 1917), English footballer
- E. T. York (1922–2011), American university president
- Francine York (1936–2017), American actress
- Gabe York (born 1993), American basketball player for Hapoel Tel Aviv of the Israeli Basketball Premier League
- Harry York (born 1974), Canadian ice hockey player
- Herbert York (1921–2009), American physicist
- James W. York (1939–2023), American mathematical physicist
- James Warren York (1839–1927), American musical instrument innovator
- Jason York (born 1970), Canadian ice hockey player
- Jerry York (born 1945), American hockey coach
- Jerry York (businessman) (1938–2010), American businessman
- John York (born 1949), American businessman
- John York (died 1569), English merchant
- John J. York (born 1958), American actor
- Jones Orin York (1893–1970), American spy for Russia
- Justin York (born 1983), American guitarist
- Kathleen York (born 1961), American actress and singer-songwriter
- Keith York, English drummer
- Melissa York (born 1969), American drummer
- Michael York (born 1942), British actor
- Michael York (field hockey player) (born 1967), Australian field hockey player
- Mike York (born 1978), American ice hockey player
- Morgan York (born 1993), American actress
- Myrth York (born 1946), American politician
- Peter York (born 1944), British management consultant, author and broadcaster
- Rachel York (born 1971), American actress and singer
- Roy E. York (1879–1955), American farmer and politician
- Rudy York (1913–1970), American baseball player
- Russell J. York (1921–2006), American war hero
- Rusty York (1935–2014), American singer
- Samuel York (1645–1718), for whom York Landing, Maine, is named
- Sarah York (born 1978), American pen-pal of Manuel Noriega
- Steve York (born 1943), American documentary filmmaker
- J. Steven York (born 1957), American writer
- Susan York, American artist
- Susannah York (1939–2011), British actress
- Taurean York (born 2005), American football player
- Taylor York (born 1989), American musician
- Teri York (born 1955), Canadian diver
- Tina York (born 1954), German pop singer
- Tony York (1912–1970), American baseball player
- Tyre York (1836–1916), American politician
- William Herbert York (1918–2004), American musician
- York (explorer) (1770–1831), American slave who served with the Lewis and Clark Expedition

== Yorke ==
=== People ===
- Andy Yorke (born 1972), British musician
- Annie Henrietta Yorke (1844-1926), English philanthropist, temperance reformer
- Barbara Yorke (born 1951), British historian
- Charles Philip Yorke (1764–1834), British politician
- Charles Yorke, 4th Earl of Hardwicke (1799–1873), British politician
- Charles Yorke (1722–1770), British lawyer and politician
- Charles Yorke (British Army officer) (1790–1880), British soldier
- Clint Yorke (born 1962), Tobagoan cricketer
- Dwight Yorke (born 1971), Trinidad and Tobago football player
- Edith Yorke (1867–1934), British actress
- Elenor Yorke (1911–1983), American author
- Henry Yorke (priest) (1803–1871), Archdeacon of Huntington
- Henry Redhead Yorke (1772–1813), English writer and radical publicist
- Henry Vincent Yorke (1905–1973), British author
- Horatio Arthur Yorke (1848–1930), British lieutenant-colonel (Royal Engineers) and Board of Trade Inspector of Railways
- James Yorke (disambiguation), several people
- John Yorke (disambiguation), several people
- Joseph Sydney Yorke (1768–1831), British admiral
- Margaret Yorke (pseudonym of Margaret Beda Nicholson; 1924–2012), British author
- Michael Yorke (1939–2019), Anglican priest
- Nick Yorke (born 2002), American baseball player
- Philip Yorke, 1st Earl of Hardwicke (1690–1764), British lawyer and politician
- Philip Yorke, 2nd Earl of Hardwicke (1720–1790), British politician
- Philip Yorke, 3rd Earl of Hardwicke (1757–1834), British politician
- Thomas Yorke (disambiguation), several people

=== Characters ===
- Hal Yorke, fictional vampire in the British TV Series Being Human
- J.T. Yorke, a fictional character in Degrassi: The Next Generation

== See also ==
- House of York
