= Jim York =

Jim York may refer to:

- Jim York (catcher)
- Jim York (pitcher)
- Jim York (fighter)

== See also ==
- James York (disambiguation)
