= Peter York (disambiguation) =

Peter York (born 1944) is a British management consultant, author and broadcaster.

Peter York may also refer to:

- Peter York (MP) (1542–1589), MP for Ripon
- Pete York (born 1942), musician
- Peter York (actor) from Paxton Whitehead
- Peter York (producer) from 40th Annual Grammy Awards

== See also ==
- Peter Yorke (1864–1925), Irish priest and activist
- Peter York Solmssen (born 1955), American lawyer and businessman
- York (surname)
