= Alex Brosque =

Australian soccer player

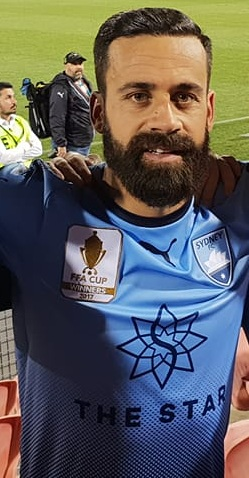
- Brosque in 2018

Personal information
- Full name: Alex Jason Brosque
- Date of birth: 12 October 1983 (age 43)
- Place of birth: Sydney, New South Wales, Australia
- Height: 1.82 m (6 ft 0 in)
- Positions: Forward; midfielder

Youth career
- Welcome Sports
- 2001: AIS

Senior career*
Years	Team	Apps	(Gls)
2001–2004	Marconi Stallions	55	(13)
2004–2005	Feyenoord	0	(0)
2004–2005	→ Westerlo (loan)	16	(2)
2005–2006	Brisbane Roar	21	(8)
2006–2011	Sydney FC	104	(30)
2011–2012	Shimizu S-Pulse	56	(13)
2012–2014	Al Ain	39	(14)
2014–2019	Sydney FC	118	(37)
Total		409	(117)

International career
2002–2003	Australia U20	9	(4)
2004	Australia U23	5	(2)
2004–2013	Australia	21	(5)
Medal record
Representing Australia
Men's Association football
OFC Nations Cup
Winner	2004 Australia
OFC U-20 Championship
Winner	2002 Fiji/Vanuatu
- * Club domestic league appearances and goals

Alex Jason Brosque (/bɹɒsk(e)/ BROSK or bros-KEH; Spanish: [ˈaleɣs ˈβɾoske]; (Note: In isolation, Brosque is pronounced [ˈbɾoske].) born 12 October 1983) is an Australian former professional soccer player who was the captain of A-League club Sydney FC. He played primarily as a striker but played predominantly as a midfielder in central midfield during his time in Japan.

== Club career ==
Brosque was born in Sydney, to Uruguayan parents, who migrated to Australia in the 70s.

In 2001 Brosque, aged 18, began his career playing for Marconi Stallions in the now-defunct National Soccer League. In three seasons at the club he made over 50 appearances and was considered one of Australia's best prospects having been voted NSL Under-21 Player of the Year for consecutive seasons in 2003 and 2004.

His form at club and international level attracted international attention, and after the conclusion of the 03-04 NSL season Brosque signed for Dutch club Feyenoord Rotterdam. He was immediately loaned out to Belgian club Westerlo where he struggled due to an ankle injury, making only sixteen appearances and scoring two goals.

=== Brisbane Roar ===
With the creation of the new A-League Brosque returned to Australia, signing for Brisbane Roar. Brosque, along with his team, struggled in front of goal for much of the 2005–06 season (at one point Brisbane led the league in total shots but was second last in goals scored) before scoring four times in the last three games of the season to nearly take his team to the A-League semi finals. Brosque won the inaugural Reebok Golden Boot along with Stewart Petrie, Archie Thompson and Bobby Despotovski with 8 goals.

=== Sydney FC ===
On 11 February 2006 Alex Brosque announced his move to then champions Sydney FC. He joined the club for the A-League 2006-07 season on a three-year contract. Brosque played his first game for Sydney against his former club Queensland Roar in the Pre-season cup on 15 July 2006, setting up the first goal before scoring the match-winner in Sydney's 2–1 victory. He scored his first A-League goal for Sydney FC against Perth Glory in round 17. Brosque scored in the 1–1 draw that got Sydney FC into the 2006–2007 finals series against his old club the Roar which knocked them out in the process.

After a disappointing first year at Sydney FC, Brosque discovered some of his best form and was the leading goal scorer for Sydney FC with 8 in the regular season. He scored two crucial braces against Perth Glory and Central Coast Mariners which gained Sydney some valuable points during the season. His partnership with Juninho Paulista was evident during the season, with 5 of his goals coming from the Brazilian's killer passes.

Brosque also scored 2 of the 5 goals scored by Sydney against Los Angeles Galaxy at Telstra Stadium in November 2007. At the end of the 2007/2008 season he became Sydney's highest goalscorer, with 11 goals (including the games against Los Angeles Galaxy) for the season.

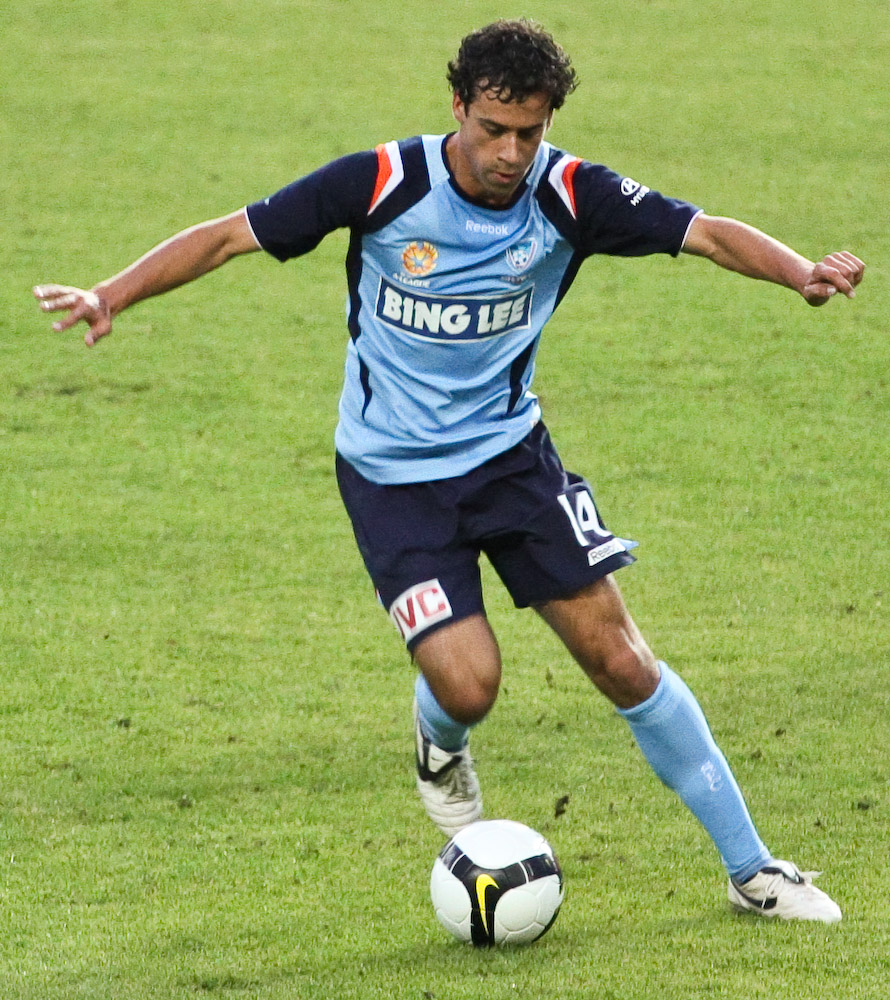
Brosque playing for Sydney FC in the 08/09 season

Brosque continued to be a regular for Sydney FC entering into his third season with the club. He scored his first goal of the 08/09 season in Sydney's 5–2 demolition of Perth Glory, taking his tally to 13 – making him Sydney's 2nd highest goalscorer behind former captain Steve Corica on 15. He scored his next goal a fortnight later against Adelaide United in Sydney's 3–0 win, taking him to within a goal of being Sydney's highest goalscorer. Brosque led the Hyundai A-League with 7 assists in the 08/09 season.

Brosque started the 09/10 season impressively forming a strong partnership with Mark Bridge in the forward line. These performances saw Brosque rewarded with a recall to the Socceroos for the first time in over four years. On 22 July 2010, Brosque signed a three-year contract extension with Sydney FC, keeping him at the club until the end of the 2013–14 season.

Brosque was capped in his 100th game for Sydney FC during the Round 14 game against Perth Glory at Parramatta Stadium. Sydney would go on to win 2–0, with Brosque scoring his 29th goal to seal the victory for the Sky Blues.

=== Shimizu S-Pulse ===
On 31 January 2011, Sydney FC agreed to release Brosque for $400,000 to join Shimizu S-Pulse, however Sydney FC vice chairman Scott Barlow announced Sydney was considering its options as to filing a complaint with FIFA, for the club believed Shimizu S-Pulse approached Brosque without the club's permission. Alex made his debut for his new club on 5 March 2011, playing a full game in the 3–0 loss to Kashiwa Reysol, the club's first match of the 2011 J-league Season Brosque scored his first goal for the club on 7 May 2011, scoring in the 18th minute to help his side claim a one-all draw against Nagoya Grampus.

=== Al Ain FC ===
On 26 September 2012, Brosque joined UAE Pro-League side Al Ain on a two-year contract. He made 39 appearances for the Emirates side and scored 14 goals.

=== Return to Sydney FC ===
On 26 June 2014, Brosque rejoined his former club Sydney FC on a two-year contract, after being released from Al Ain. On 8 October 2014, Brosque was announced as the captain of Sydney FC for the 2014–15 A-League season, alongside vice-captains Saša Ognenovski and Nikola Petković.

On 18 October 2014, Brosque played in his first Sydney Derby and scored the winning goal in the 79th minute.

Brosque reached double digits for the first time in his career during the 2016/17 season, scoring the opener against Melbourne City in a comprehensive 3–0 win. Brosque captained his side to the A-League double – winning both the regular season premiership and the A-League grand final. The premiership was won with four games to go, as the Sky Blues broke records and were heralded one of the A-League's greatest ever teams.

Brosque made his 200th appearance for Sydney FC in all competitions in the 2017 A-League Grand Final, which Sydney won 4–2 on penalties against Melbourne Victory.

On 14 September 2017, Brosque scored his first goal of the 2017–18 season, in a 2–0 win against Melbourne City in the 2017 FFA Cup. His first league goal came in Round 10 against Western Sydney Wanderers in a 5–0 drubbing from the Sky Blues. The game was also a milestone match for the captain, equalling club legend Terry McFlynn's appearances stat in all competitions – 214. This record was eventually broken the following round in a 3–1 win against Melbourne City, scoring the third goal of the match to top off the win.

Brosque scored his first hat-trick of the A-League era against Central Coast Mariners in a 5-2 win on 4 January 2019.

He announced his retirement would be at the end of the 2018–19 A-League season.

== International career ==
Brosque represented Australia at the 2003 FIFA World Youth Championship where they reached the second round. In 2004, Brosque made his senior international debut for Australia against Fiji in the OFC Nations Cup, where he made three appearances. Later in that year he also helped Australia reach the quarter finals at the 2004 Olympics.

On 9 November 2009, Brosque was called up to the senior national team as an injury replacement for Joshua Kennedy. It was his first call up for over 3 years. On 9 October, Brosque came off the bench in the 90th minute to replace Richard Garcia in the friendly match against Paraguay.

On 15 December 2010, Brosque was selected in the preliminary 50-man squad for the 2011 Asian Cup in January. Many people believed that he would be selected in the final 23-man squad, after Joshua Kennedy and Archie Thompson were both injured, but Brosque was then ruled out with an injury himself, costing him a chance to represent Australia for the first time in an international competition. On 2 September 2011, Brosque scored the winner in the 86th minute in Australia's 2–1 win over Thailand for the 2014 World Cup Qualifiers. A month later, on 7 October, Brosque scored a double in Australia's 5–0 win over Malaysia in a friendly match in Canberra. In Australia's 2014 FIFA World Cup qualifier against Saudi Arabia, Brosque scored another brace to help Australia win 4–2.

== Personal life ==
Brosque is a fan of Premier League club Liverpool.

He is a regular pundit for Network 10's football coverage, and particularly of the A-League.

== Career statistics ==
=== Club ===
As of match played 16 June 2018

Appearances and goals by club, season and competition
Club	Season	League			Cup		Continental		Other^{1}		Total	
Club	Season	Division	Apps	Goals	Apps	Goals	Apps	Goals	Apps	Goals	Apps	Goals
Marconi Stallions	2001–02	National Soccer League	17	1	—		—		—		17	1
Marconi Stallions	2002–03	National Soccer League	21	9	—		—		—		21	9
Marconi Stallions	2003–04	National Soccer League	17	3	—		—		—		17	3
Marconi Stallions	Total		55	13	—		—		—		55	13
Westerlo	2004–05	Pro League	16	2	0	0	—		—		16	2
Queensland Roar	2005–06	A-League	21	8	—		—		3	0	24	8
Sydney FC	2006–07	A-League	20	4	—		6	1	5	3	31	8
Sydney FC	2007–08	A-League	22	8	—		—		6	1	28	9
Sydney FC	2008–09	A-League	18	5	—		—		3	1	21	6
Sydney FC	2009–10	A-League	29	7	—		—		—		29	7
Sydney FC	2010–11	A-League	15	6	—		0	0	—		15	6
Sydney FC	Total		104	30	0	0	6	1	14	5	124	36
Shimizu S-Pulse	2011	J1 League	32	7	3	0	—		—		35	7
Shimizu S-Pulse	2012	J1 League	23	6	3	1	—		—		26	7
Shimizu S-Pulse	Total		55	13	6	1	—		—		61	14
Al Ain FC	2012–13	UAE Arabian Gulf League	19	10	0	0	—		—		19	10
Al Ain FC	2013–14	UAE Arabian Gulf League	20	4	0	0	6	1	—		26	5
Al Ain FC	Total		39	14	0	0	6	1	—		45	15
Sydney FC	2014–15	A-League	27	9	2	1	—		—		29	10
Sydney FC	2015–16	A-League	13	5	1	0	1	0	—		15	5
Sydney FC	2016–17	A-League	28	11	4	1	—		—		32	12
Sydney FC	2017–18	A-League	26	4	4	2	6	2	—		36	8
Sydney FC	Total		200	60	14	7	13	3	12	5	239	75
Career total			384	109	17	5	19	4	17	5	437	123

^{1} – includes Pre-Season Cup (2005–2008) and the Pan-Pacific Championship (2008) statistics

=== International ===
Scores and results list Australia's goal tally first.

#	Date	Venue	Opponent	Score	Result	Competition
1	2 September 2011	Suncorp Stadium, Brisbane, Australia	Thailand	2–1	2–1	2014 FIFA World Cup qualification
2	7 October 2011	Canberra Stadium, Canberra, Australia	Malaysia	3–0	5–0	Friendly
3	7 October 2011	Canberra Stadium, Canberra, Australia	Malaysia	5–0	5–0	Friendly
4	29 February 2012	AAMI Park, Melbourne, Australia	Saudi Arabia	1–1	4–2	2014 FIFA World Cup qualification
5	29 February 2012	AAMI Park, Melbourne, Australia	Saudi Arabia	3–2	4–2	2014 FIFA World Cup qualification

== Honours ==
Sydney

- A-League Premiership: 2009–10, 2016–17, 2017–18
- A-League Championship: 2009–10, 2016–17, 2018–19
- FFA Cup: 2017

Al Ain

- UAE Pro League: 2012–13
- UAE President's Cup: 2013–14

Australia

- OFC Nations Cup: 2004

Australia U-20

- OFC U-19 Men's Championship: 2002

Individual

- National Soccer League Under-21 Player of the Season: 2002–03, 2003–04
- A-League Golden Boot: 2005–06
- Sydney FC Player of the Season: 2007–08, 2008–09, 2009–10
- PFA A-League Team of the Season: 2009–10, 2016–17
- Sydney FC Hall of Fame: 2019

Records

- All-time top scorer of Sydney FC
- All-time most capped of Sydney FC
