= Sergeant York (disambiguation) =

Sergeant York or Alvin C. York was one of the most-decorated American soldiers in World War I.

Sergeant York may also refer to:

- Sergeant York (film), a 1941 biographical film about Alvin C. York
- Sergeant York (horse)
- M247 Sergeant York, a self-propelled anti-aircraft weapon
- Sgt. York Trophy, a trophy in American football
- York (explorer), a slave who was a key participant in the Lewis and Clark expedition who was posthumously granted the rank of honorary sergeant in the United States Army

== See also ==
- York (disambiguation)
- York (surname)
