= Tom York =

Tom York may refer to:

- Tom York (television personality) (1924–2021), American television personality
- Tom York (baseball) (1850–1936), American baseball left fielder
- Tom York (actor), English actor

== See also ==
- Thom Yorke (born 1968), English musician and lead singer of Radiohead
- Tom Yorke (1920–2004), rugby league footballer
- Thomas Yorke (disambiguation)
