= Sydney FC Hall of Fame =

Hall of Fame of Sydney Football Club

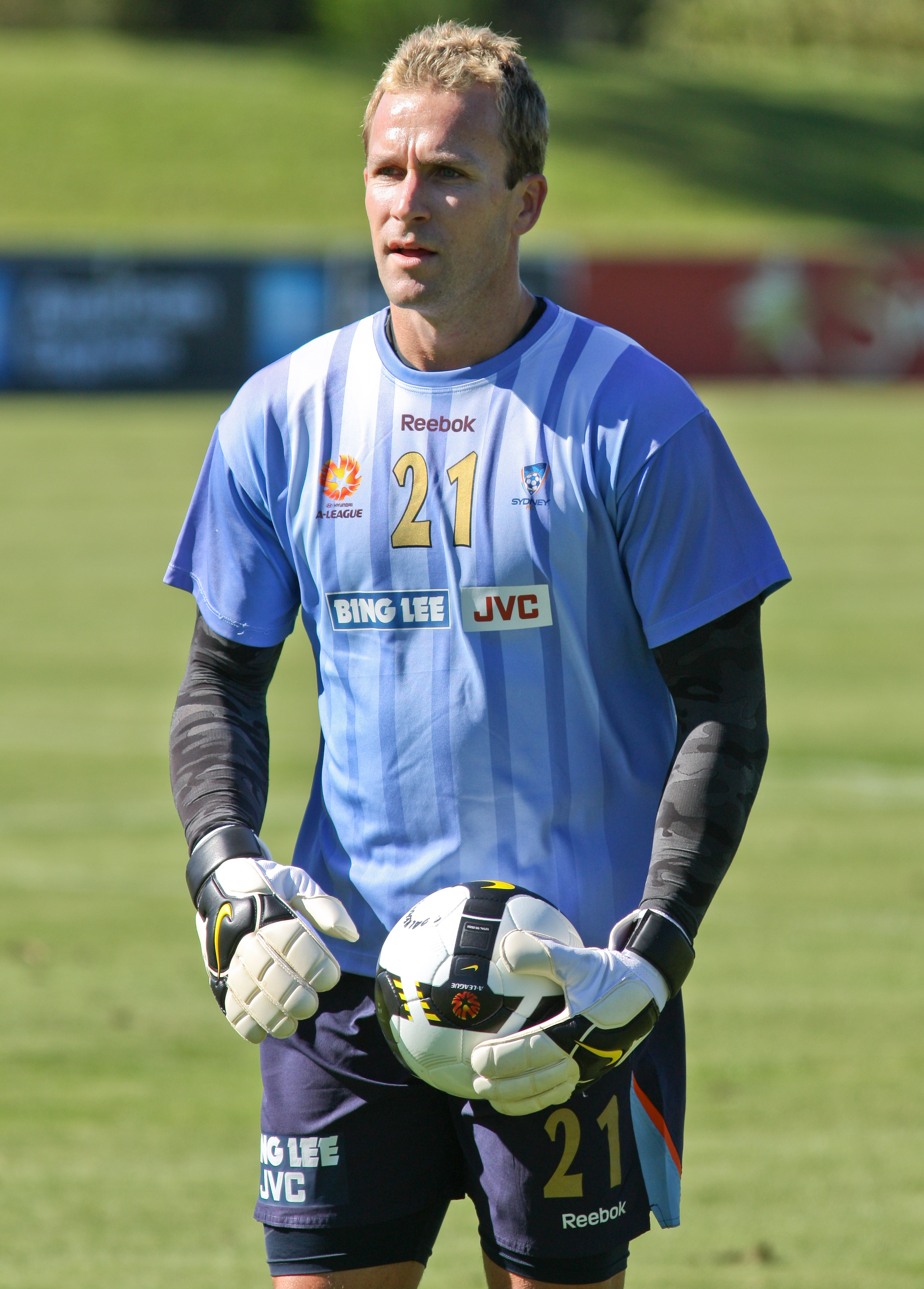
Clint Bolton, one of eight inaugural members of the Sydney FC Hall of Fame.

Sydney Football Club is an Australian association football club founded in 2004. In 2015, the club created a hall of fame into which personnel associated with the club are inducted from time to time.

The Hall of Fame is open to players, coaches, administrators, fans and volunteers. Players, coaches and administrators become eligible for induction upon their retirement or departure from the club. Years of service and total games played or coached are considerations, but not necessarily determinative in deciding who is selected. Selections are made by the Sydney FC board.

Australia internationals Alex Wilkinson and Teresa Polias are the most recent representatives of the club to be inducted.

== Members ==
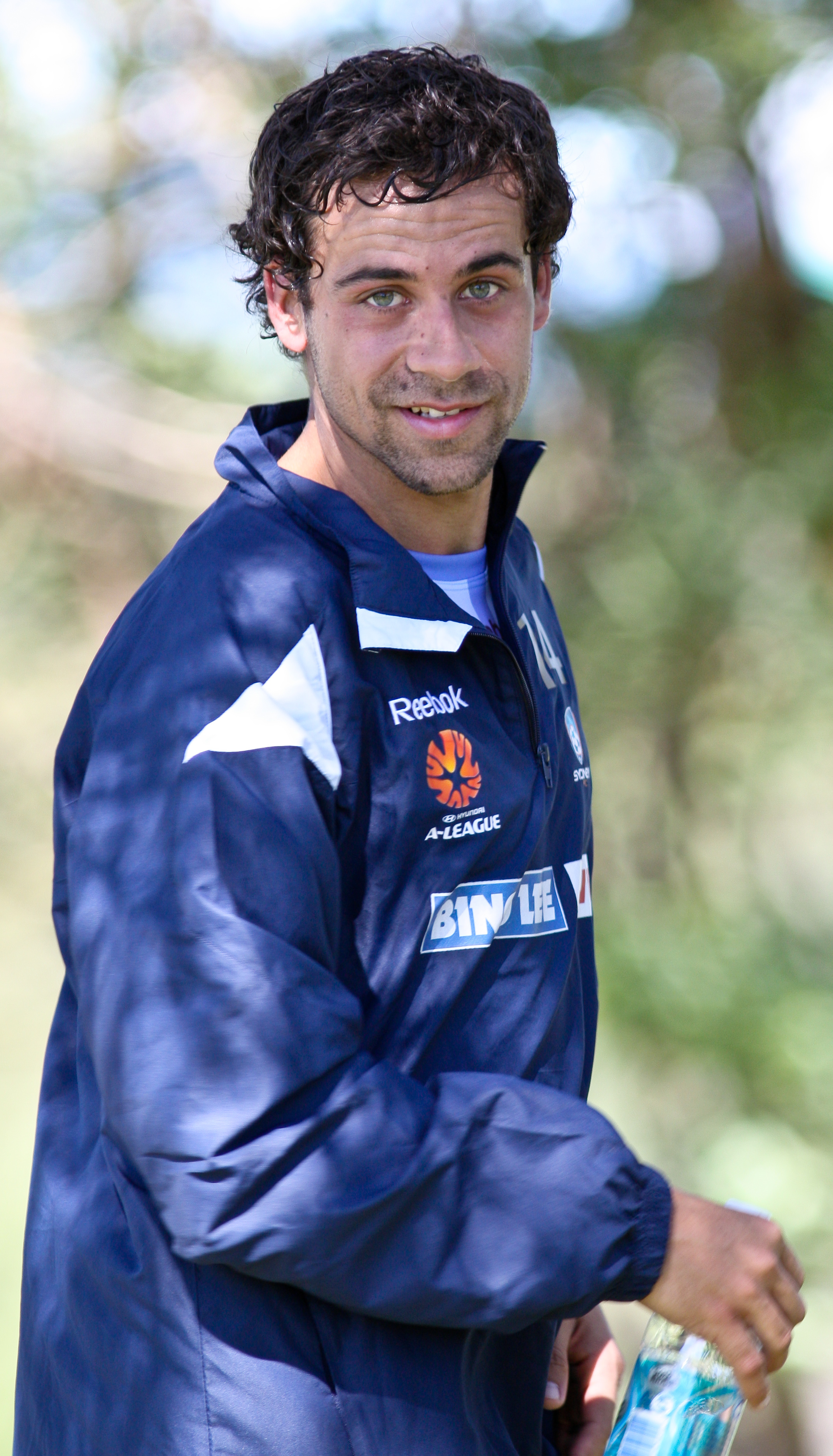
Alex Brosque was inducted into the Hall of Fame in 2019.

*	Players who represented their country while at the club
‡	Club record holder

Members of the Sydney FC Hall of Fame
Name	Nationality	Academy or SFC was first professional club	Position (Note: For a full description of positions see football positions)	Year of induction	Sydney FC career	Appearances	Goals	Notes
Clint Bolton	Australia*	No	Goalkeeper	2015	2005–2010	141	0	
Alex Brosque	Australia*	No	Forward	2019	2006–2011; 2014–2019	265	83	(Note: All-time men's appearance record-holder and top scorer)‡
Steve Corica	Australia*	No	Midfielder	2015	2005–2010	137	31	
Alessandro Del Piero	Italy	No	Forward	2015	2012–2014	48	24	
Vítězslav Lavička	Czech Republic	N/A	Manager	2015	2009–2012	–	–	
Pierre Littbarski	Germany	N/A	Manager	2015	2005–2006	–	–	
Terry McFlynn	Northern Ireland	No	Midfielder	2015	2005–2014	212	7	
Teresa Polias	Australia*	No	Midfielder	2023	2010–2021	145	4	(Note: All-time women's appearance record-holder)‡
Marko Rudan	Australia	No	Defender	2015	2005–2007	71	6	
Alen Stajcic	Australia	N/A	Manager	2016	2008–2014	–	–	
Alex Wilkinson	Australia	No	Defender	2023	2016–2023	221	3	
Dwight Yorke	Trinidad and Tobago*	No	Midfielder	2015	2005–2006	27	9	

== See also ==
- Football Federation Australia Hall of Fame
