= James York =

James York may refer to:

- James W. York (born 1939), American mathematical physicist, expert on general relativity
- James Warren York (1839–1927), American musician and business figure
- Lefty York (1892–1961), baseball pitcher
- Jim York (catcher) (1895–1934), American baseball player
- Jim York (pitcher) (born 1947), American baseball player

== See also ==
- James Yorke (disambiguation)
