= List of Sydney FC records and statistics =

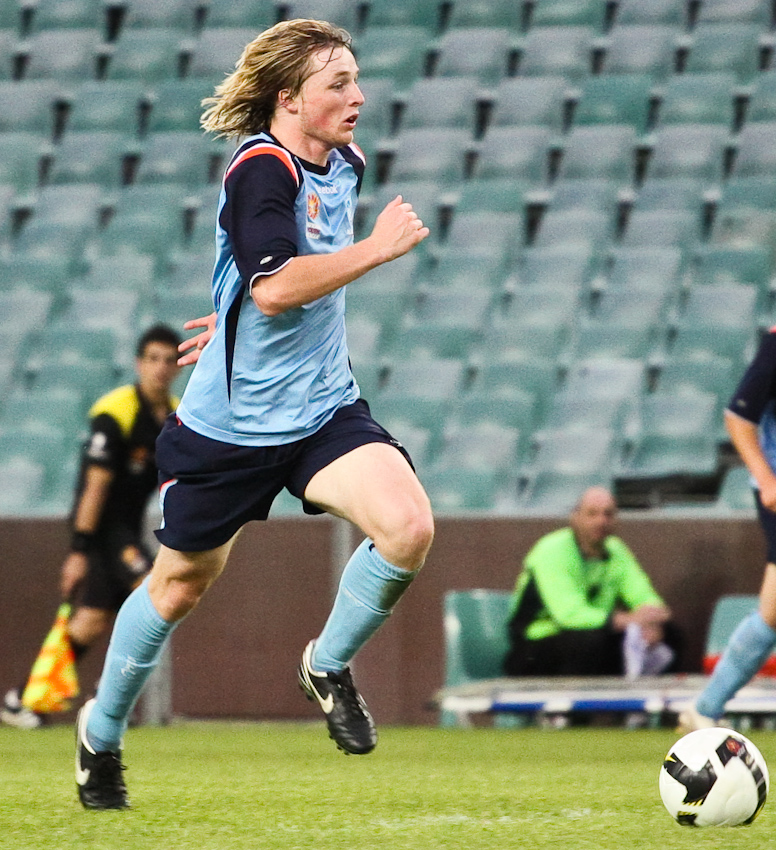
Rhyan Grant has the highest number of appearances for Sydney in the current squad

Sydney Football Club is an Australian association football club based in Moore Park, Sydney. The club was formed in 2004. Sydney became the first out of three clubs based in New South Wales admitted into the A-League in 2005.

The list of encompasses the honours won by Sydney FC at national and regional level, records set by the club, their managers and their players. The player records section itemises the club's leading goalscorers and those who have made the most appearances in first-team competitions. It also records notable achievements by Sydney FC players on the international stage.

Sydney FC have won 12 top-flight titles, including four A-League Men Premierships, five A-League Men Championships, two Australia Cups and one Oceania Club Championship. The club's record appearances maker is Rhyan Grant, who currently has 407 appearances since his debut in 2008. Alex Brosque is Sydney FC's record goalscorer, scoring 83 goals in total.

All figures are correct as of 28 May 2026.

== Honours and achievements ==
=== Domestic ===
- A-League Men Championship (finals)

Winners (5) – Record: 2006, 2010, 2017, 2019, 2020
Runners-up (3): 2015, 2021, 2026

- A-League Men Premiership (regular season)

Winners (4) – Record: 2009–10, 2016–17, 2017–18, 2019–20
Runners-up (4): 2005–06, 2014–15, 2018–19, 2020–21

- Australia Cup

Winners (2): 2017, 2023
Runners-up (2): 2016, 2018

=== Continental ===
- OFC Champions League

Winners (1): 2005

=== Other ===
- Townsville Football Cup
- Winners (1): 2014

=== Individual recognitions (including women's awards) ===
Johnny Warren Medal

Season	Player
2016–17	(Serbia) Milos Ninkovic
2017–18	(Poland) Adrian Mierzejewski
2020–21	(Serbia) Milos Ninkovic (2)

- The 2020-21 award was shared with Ulises Dávila (Wellington Phoenix)

Julie Dolan Medal

Season	Player
2010–11	Kyah Simon

A-League Men Coach of the Year

Season	Manager
2016–17	Graham Arnold (2)
2017–18	Graham Arnold (3)

- Graham Arnold first received this award in 2012 with Central Coast Mariners and was the first coach to receive the award three times before Tony Popovic achieved this in 2022.

A-League Women Coach of the Year

Season	Manager
2010–11	Alen Stajcic
2013–14	Alen Stajcic (2)

A-League Men Young Footballer of the Year

Season	Player
2020–21	Joel King

A-League Women Young Footballer of the Year

Season	Player
2010–11	Kyah Simon
2014	Amy Harrison
2016–17	Remy Siemsen

A-League Men Goal of the Year
None

A-League Women Goal of the Year

Season	Player
2010–11	Heather Garriock
2017–18	Lisa De Vanna
2021–22	Rachel Lowe

A-League Men Golden Boot

Season	Player	Goals
2014–15	(Austria) Marc Janko	16
2017–18	(Brazil) Bobô	27

A-League Women Golden Boot

Season	Player	Goals
2008–09	Leena Khamis	7
2010–11	Kyah Simon	12
2013–14	Jodie Taylor	10
2019–20	Remy Siemsen	7

- The 2019–20 award was shared with three other players

A-League Men Goalkeeper of the Year

Season	Player
2016–17	Danny Vukovic
2019–20	Andrew Redmayne
2020–21	Andrew Redmayne (2)

- Andrew Redmayne became the third goalkeeper to receive the award for a second time.

A-League Women Goalkeeper of the Year

Year	Player
2018–19	Aubrey Bledsoe

- Award shared with Lydia Williams (Melbourne City)

PFA Men's Young Player of the Year

Season	Player
2017	Alex Gersbach

- Alex Gersbach transferred from Sydney FC to Rosenborg BK during his award season

PFA Women's Young Player of the Year
Unknown

PFA Men's Footballer of the Year
None

PFA Women's Footballer of the Year

Year	Player
2010	Servet Uzunlar
2013	Sam Kerr

- Sam Kerr also played for Western New York Flash during her award season

==== Grand Final Awards ====
Joe Marston Medal

Year	Player
2006	(Trinidad and Tobago) Dwight Yorke
2010	(Australia) Simon Colosimo
2019	(Serbia) Milos Ninkovic
2020	(Australia) Rhyan Grant

A-League Women Grand Final Player of the Match

Year	Player
2019	(United States) Savannah McCaskill
2021	(Australia) Jada Whyman
2023	(United States) Madison Haley

- Since 2016 Grand Final

Mark Viduka Medal

Year	Player
2017	(Poland) Adrian Mierzejewski
2023	(England) Joe Lolley

==== PFA A-League Men Team of the Season ====
- †: as a substitute
- (#): number of appearances in Team of the Season
- in italics: captain of the Team of the Season

Season	Players	Manager
2009–10	3: Simon Colosimo, Alex Brosque, Steve Corica†	Vitezslav Lavicka
2011–12	1: Nick Carle†	
2012–13	1: Alessandro Del Piero	
2014–15	2: Marc Janko, Milos Dimitrijevic†	
2016–17	8: Danny Vukovic, Rhyan Grant, Alex Wilkinson, Michael Zullo, Brandon O'Neill, Milos Ninkovic, Joshua Brillante†, Alex Brosque† (2)	Graham Arnold (2)
2017–18	8: Luke Wilkshire, Alex Wilkinson (2), Michael Zullo (2), Joshua Brillante (2), Adrian Mierzejewski, Bobô, Andrew Redmayne†, Milos Ninkovic† (2)	Graham Arnold (3)
2018–19	4: Rhyan Grant (2), Brandon O'Neill (2), Milos Ninkovic† (3), Adam Le Fondre†	
2019–20	5: Rhyan Grant (3), Alex Wilkinson (3), Luke Brattan (3), Adam Le Fondre (2), Milos Ninkovic† (4)	
2020–21	4: Rhyan Grant (4), Ryan McGowan†, Luke Brattan† (4), Milos Ninkovic† (5)	
2023–24	3: Joe Lolley, Jake Girdwood-Reich†, Anthony Caceres†	
2024–25	2: Adrian Segecic, Anthony Caceres† (2)	

- Total number of Team of the Season players: 25 (on 41 occasions, including 16 as substitutes)
- Total number of Team of the Season managers: 2 (on 3 occasions)
- Most appearances in Team of the Season whilst as Sydney FC:
  - 5 – Milos Ninkovic
  - 4 – Rhyan Grant
  - 3 – Alex Wilkinson
  - 2 – Alex Brosque, Michael Zullo, Joshua Brillante, Brandon O'Neill, Adam Le Fondre, Luke Brattan, Anthony Caceres
- Danny Vukovic and Alex Brosque were named as co-captains for the 2016–17 Team of the Season.
- Graham Arnold first received the award with Central Coast Mariners and is one of only two coaches to receive the award on three occasions.
- Luke Brattan had received the award twice before joining Sydney FC, in 2014 with Brisbane Roar and in 2018 with Melbourne City.

==== PFA A-League Women Team of the Season ====
- †: as a substitute
- (#): number of appearances in Team of the Season
- in italics: captain of the Team of the Season

Season	Players
2016–17	1: Alanna Kennedy
2017–18	4: Caitlin Foord, Aubrey Bledsoe†, Emily Sonnett†, Chloe Logarzo†
2018–19	3: Alanna Kennedy (2), Caitlin Foord (2), Danielle Colaprico†
2020–21	3: Teresa Polias, Cortnee Vine†, Clare Wheeler†
2021–22	7: Jada Whyman, Cortnee Vine (2), Ally Green, Mackenzie Hawkesby, Natalie Tobin, Rachel Lowe†, Taylor Ray†
2022–23	6: Natalie Tobin (2), Charlotte McLean, Mackenzie Hawkesby (2), Sarah Hunter, Cortnee Vine (3), Jada Whyman† (2)

- Total number of Team of the Season players: 17 (on 24 occasions, including 9 substitutes)
- Most appearances in Team of the Season:
  - 3 – Cortnee Vine
  - 2 – Alanna Kennedy, Caitlin Foord, Natalie Tobin, Mackenzie Hawkesby, Jada Whyman
- Cortnee Vine is the only Sydney FC player to be named captain of the Team of the Season on two occasions

== Player records ==
=== Appearances ===
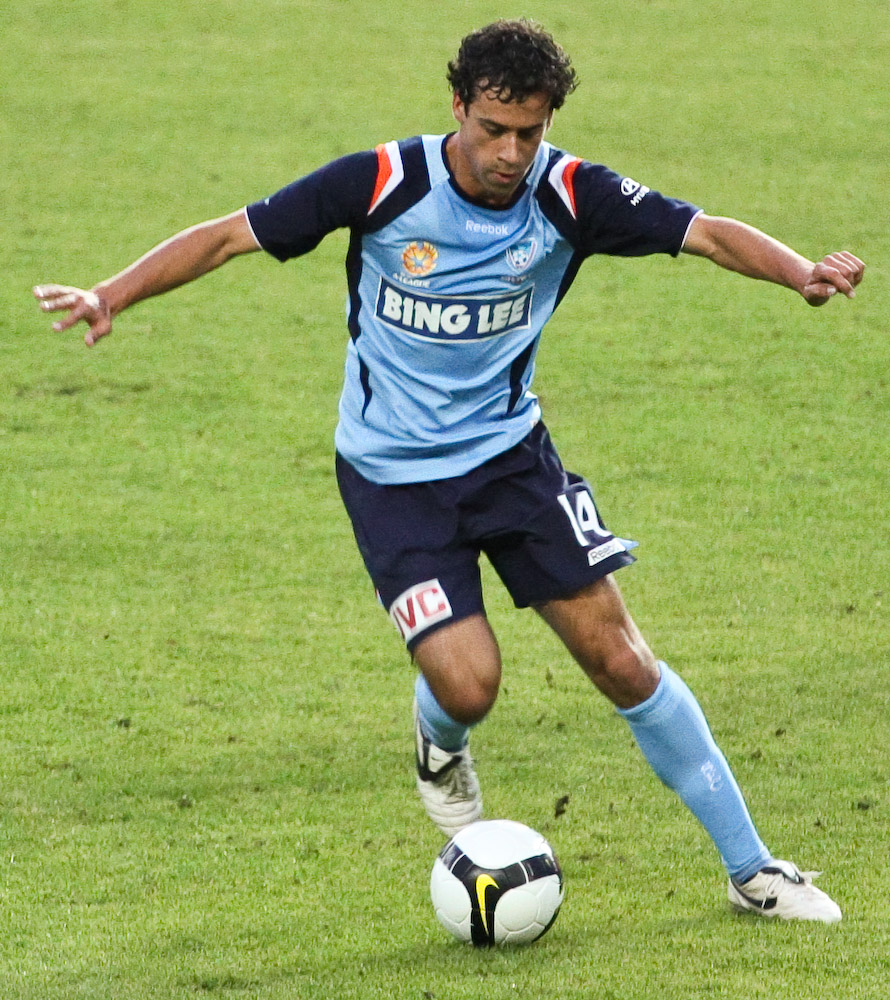
Alex Brosque had the record for the most appearances for Sydney FC

- Most A-League Men appearances: Rhyan Grant, 344
- Most national cup appearances: Alex Brosque, 27
- Most continental appearances: Rhyan Grant, 38
- Youngest first-team player: Akol Akon, 16 years, 80 days (against Sydney United 58, Australia Cup, 10 August 2025)
- Oldest first-team player: Alessandro Del Piero, 39 years, 160 days (against Melbourne Victory, A-League, 18 April 2014)
- Most consecutive appearances: Andrew Redmayne, 78 (from 2 August 2017 to 19 May 2019)

==== Most appearances ====
Competitive matches only, includes appearances as substitute. Numbers in brackets indicate goals scored.

#	Name	Years	A-League Men	National Cup^{a}	Continental^{b}	Other^{c}	Total
1	(Australia) Rhyan Grant	2008–	348 (17)	29 (1)	38 (2)	0 (0)	415 (20)
2	(Australia) Alex Brosque	2006–2011; 2014–2019	222 (67)	27 (12)	16 (4)	2 (0)	267 (83)
3	(Australia) Andrew Redmayne	2017–2025	192 (0)	24 (0)	22 (0)	0 (0)	238 (0)
4	(Serbia) Miloš Ninković	2015–2022	181 (35)	19 (4)	21 (2)	0 (0)	221 (41)
5	(Australia) Alex Wilkinson	2016–2023	183 (2)	18 (0)	20 (0)	0 (0)	221 (2)
6	(Northern Ireland) Terry McFlynn	2005–2014	178 (7)	18 (0)	11 (0)	7 (0)	214 (7)
7	(Australia) Anthony Caceres	2018–2025	176 (15)	12 (3)	26 (0)	0 (0)	214 (18)
8	(Australia) Sebastian Ryall	2009–2018	168 (10)	13 (2)	8 (0)	0 (0)	189 (12)
9	(Australia) Paulo Retre	2017–2023	139 (4)	16 (0)	21 (0)	0 (0)	176 (4)
10	(Australia) Joel King	2019–2022; 2023–2026	128 (4)	13 (0)	18 (0)	0 (0)	159 (4)

a. Includes the A-League Pre-Season Challenge Cup and Australia Cup
b. Includes the Oceania Club Championship and AFC Champions League
c. Includes goals and appearances (including those as a substitute) in the FIFA Club World Cup, Pan-Pacific Championship and 2005 Australian Club World Championship Qualifying Tournament.

=== Goalscorers ===
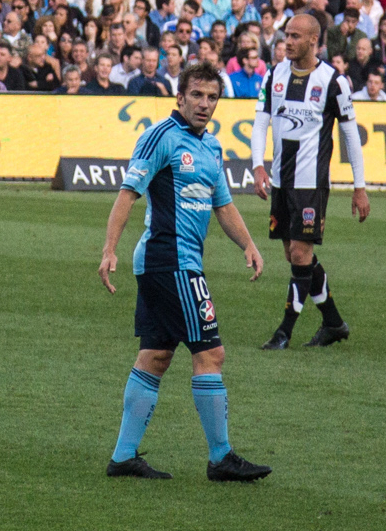
Alessandro Del Piero is Sydney's oldest goalscorer

- Most goals in a season: Bobô, with 36 goals in the 2017–18 season.
- Most league goals in a season: Bobô, with 27 goals in the 2017–18 A-League season
- Youngest goalscorer: Chris Payne, 17 years, 308 days (against Queensland Roar, A-League Pre-Season Challenge Cup, 19 August 2006)
- Oldest goalscorer: Alessandro Del Piero, 39 years, 148 days (against Wellington Phoenix, A-League, 6 April 2014)
- Most consecutive goalscoring appearances: Marc Janko, in 7 consecutive matches from 24 January 2015 to 15 March 2015.

==== Top goalscorers ====
Competitive matches only. Numbers in brackets indicate appearances.

#	Name	Years	A-League Men	National Cup^{a}	Continental^{b}	Other^{c}	Total	Ratio
1	(Australia) Alex Brosque	2006–2011; 2014–2019	67 (222)	12 (27)	4 (16)	0 (2)	83 (267)	0.31
2	(England) Adam Le Fondre	2018–2023	62 (106)	5 (9)	6 (13)	0 (0)	73 (128)	0.57
3	(Brazil) Bobô	2016–2018; 2021–2022	59 (100)	9 (11)	3 (9)	0 (0)	71 (120)	0.59
4	(Serbia) Miloš Ninković	2015–2022	35 (181)	4 (19)	2 (21)	0 (0)	41 (221)	0.19
5	(England) Joe Lolley	2022–2026	31 (96)	2 (9)	3 (10)	0 (0)	36 (115)	0.31
6	(Australia) Steve Corica	2005–2010	23 (107)	1 (14)	7 (11)	0 (7)	31 (139)	0.22
7	(Australia) David Carney	2005–2007; 2016–2018	16 (94)	5 (19)	3 (19)	3 (5)	27 (137)	0.2
8	(Australia) Sasho Petrovski	2005–2007	14 (43)	6 (9)	4 (4)	2 (5)	26 (61)	0.43
9	(Italy) Alessandro Del Piero	2012–2014	24 (48)	0 (0)	0 (0)	0 (0)	24 (48)	0.5
10	(Slovakia) Robert Mak	2022–2024	20 (53)	2 (6)	0 (0)	0 (0)	22 (59)	0.37

a. Includes the A-League Pre-Season Challenge Cup and Australia Cup
b. Includes the Oceania Club Championship and AFC Champions League
c. Includes goals and appearances (including those as a substitute) in the FIFA Club World Cup, Pan-Pacific Championship and 2005 Australian Club World Championship Qualifying Tournament.

=== International ===
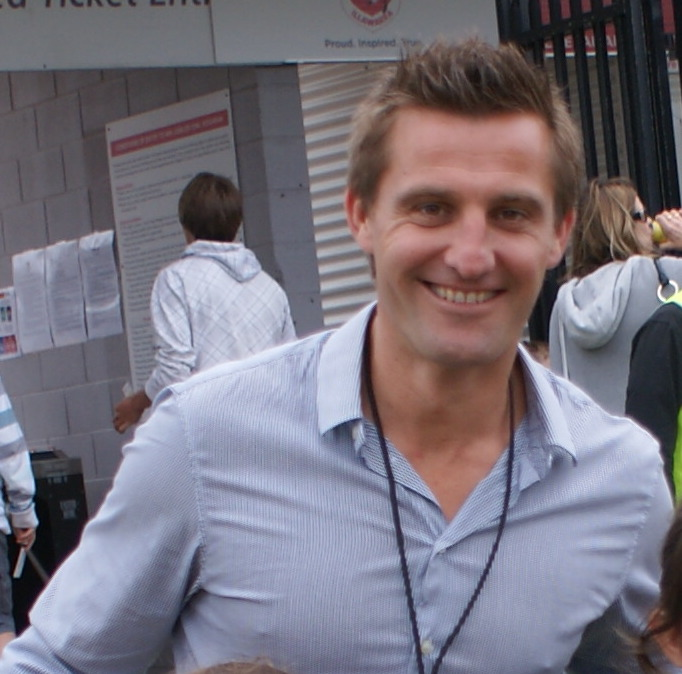
David Zdrillic was the first Sydney FC player to receive an international cap.

This section refers only to caps won while a Sydney FC player.

- First capped player: David Zdrilic, for Australia against Indonesia on 29 March 2005
- Most capped player: Dwight Yorke with 17 caps.
- Most capped player for Australia: Rhyan Grant with 21 caps.
- First player to play in the Asian Cup finals: Rhyan Grant, for Australia against Jordan, 6 January 2019

=== Transfers ===
==== Record transfer fees received ====
Where the report mentions an initial fee potentially rising to a higher figure depending on contractual clauses being satisfied in the future, only the initial fee is listed in the tables.

#	Fee	Received from	For	Date	Notes	Ref
1	$2.5m	(England) Portsmouth	(Australia) Hayden Matthews	27 January 2025		
2	$1.3m	(China) Changchun Yatai	(Poland) Adrian Mierzejewski	5 July 2018		
2	$1.3m	(United States) St. Louis City SC	(Australia) Jake Girdwood-Reich	4 July 2024		
4	$950k	(Turkey) Alanyaspor	(Brazil) Bobô	7 July 2018		
5	$850k	(Belgium) Genk	(Australia) Danny Vukovic	21 June 2017		

== Managerial records ==
- First full-time manager: Pierre Littbarski managed Sydney FC from February 2005 to May 2006
- Longest-serving manager: Steve Corica — 5 years, 131 days (1 July 2018 to 7 November 2023)
- Shortest tenure as manager: Anthony Crea — 1 day (22 October 2007 to 23 October 2007)
- Highest win percentage: Pierre Littbarski, 60.53%
- Lowest win percentage: Branko Čulina, 25.00%

== Club records ==
=== Matches ===
- First match: Sydney FC 6–1 Manly United, friendly, 25 March 2005
- First A-League Men match: Sydney FC 1–1 Melbourne Victory, 28 August 2005
- First national cup match: Sydney FC 3–1 New Zealand Knights, A-League Pre-Season Challenge Cup group stage, 23 July 2005
- First continental match: Sydney FC 3–2 Auckland City, Oceania Club Championship group stage, 31 May 2005

==== Record wins ====
- Record A-League Men win:
  - 7–1 against Wellington Phoenix, 19 January 2013
  - 6–0 against Perth Glory, 30 December 2017
  - 7–1 against Perth Glory, 28 April 2024
- Record national cup win: 8–0 against Darwin Rovers, Round of 32, 2 August 2017
- Record continental win: 9–2 against Sobou, Oceania Club Championship group stage, 2 June 2005
- Record Asian win:
  - 5–0 against Kaya–Iloilo, AFC Champions League preliminary round, 8 March 2022
  - 5–0 against Eastern, AFC Champions League Two group stage, 19 September 2024.

==== Record defeats ====
- Record A-League Men defeat:
  - 0–5 against Melbourne Victory, 16 October 2005
  - 2–7 against Central Coast Mariners, 3 November 2012
- Record national cup defeat:
  - 0–3 against Wellington Phoenix, A-League Pre-Season Challenge Cup group stage, 22 July 2006
  - 0–3 against Central Coast Mariners, A-League Pre-Season Challenge Cup group stage, 29 July 2007
  - 0–3 against Central Coast Mariners, A-League Pre-Season Challenge Cup group stage, 27 July 2008
- Record continental defeat:
  - 0–4 against Kawasaki Frontale, AFC Champions League group stage, 21 May 2019
  - 0–4 against Yokohama F. Marinos, AFC Champions League group stage, 19 February 2020

==== Record consecutive results ====
- Record consecutive wins: 10
  - from 7 May 2005 to 30 July 2005
  - from 10 August 2016 to 13 November 2016
- Record consecutive defeats: 6, from 22 April 2022 to 10 May 2022
- Record consecutive matches without a defeat: 18, from 24 February 2017 to 3 November 2017
- Record consecutive matches without a win: 10, from 7 August 2010 to 16 October 2010
- Record consecutive matches without conceding a goal: 8, from 10 August 2016 to 29 October 2016
- Record consecutive matches without scoring a goal: 5
  - from 9 May 2007 to 29 July 2007
  - from 4 December 2010 to 29 December 2010

=== Goals ===
- Most league goals scored in a season: 64 in 27 matches, A-League, 2017–18
- Fewest league goals scored in a season: 28 in 21 matches, A-League, 2007–08
- Most league goals conceded in a season: 51 in 27 matches, A-League, 2012–13
- Fewest league goals conceded in a season: 12 in 27 matches, A-League, 2016–17

=== Points ===
- Most points in a season: 66 in 27 matches, A-League, 2016–17
- Fewest points in a season: 26 in 21 matches, A-League, 2008–09

=== Attendances ===
- Highest attendance at Sydney Football Stadium: 41,689, against Central Coast Mariners, A-League Grand Final, 18 October 2014
- Lowest attendance in Sydney Football Stadium: 3,424 against Perth Glory, A-League Pre-Season Challenge Cup semi-final, 3,424
- Highest attendance at Jubilee: 19,081 against Melbourne Victory, A-League, 25 November 2018
- Lowest attendance at Jubilee: 435 against Kaya–Iloilo, AFC Champions League group stage, 8 March 2022

== See also ==
- List of Sydney FC seasons
