= Marc Janko =

Austrian footballer

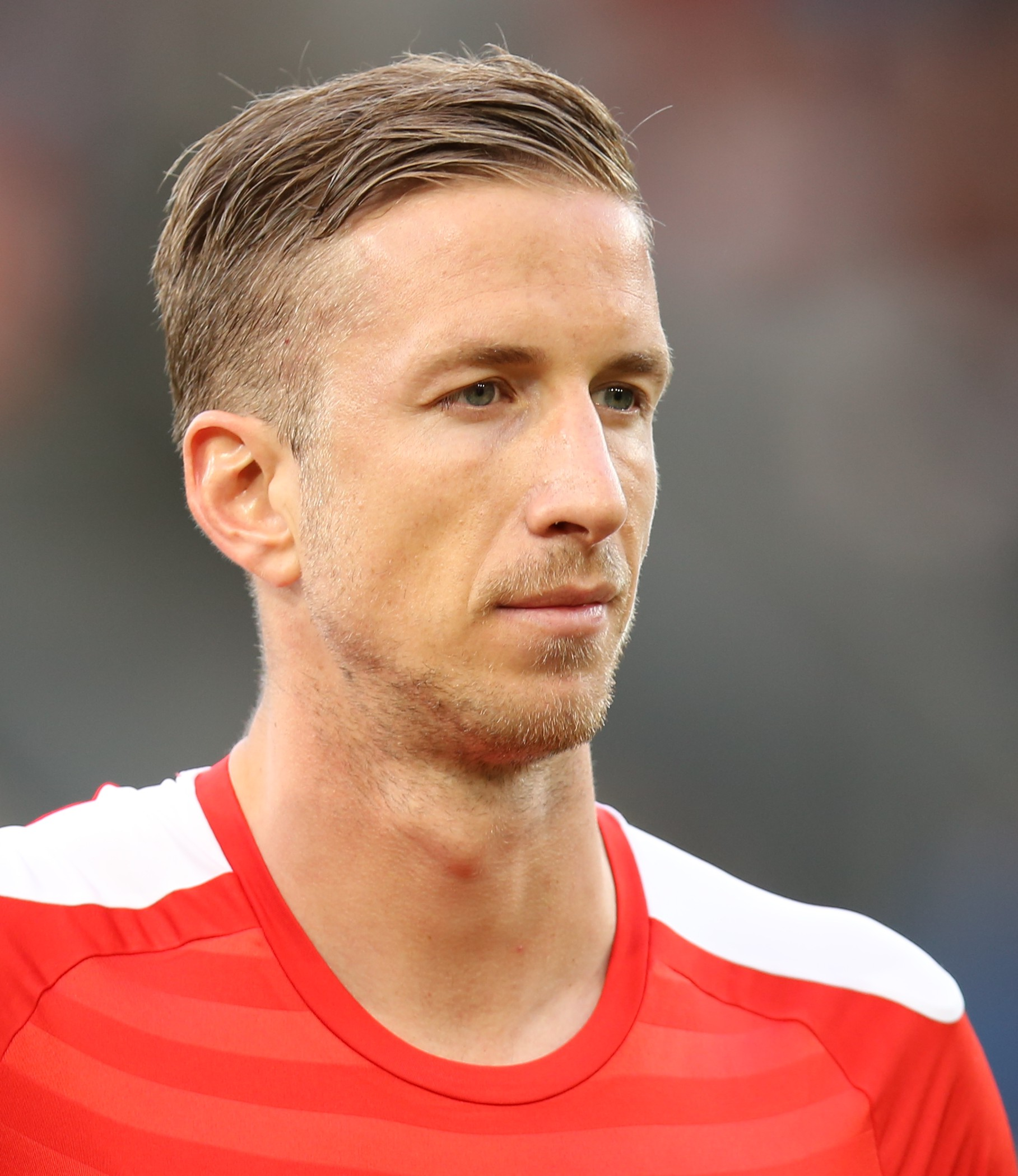
- Janko with Austria in 2014

Personal information
- Date of birth: 25 June 1983 (age 43)
- Place of birth: Vienna, Austria
- Height: 1.96 m (6 ft 5 in)
- Position: Striker

Youth career
- 2000–2004: Admira Wacker

Senior career*
Years	Team	Apps	(Gls)
2004–2005	Admira Wacker	13	(2)
2005–2010	Red Bull Salzburg	108	(75)
2010–2012	Twente	45	(24)
2012	Porto	10	(4)
2012–2014	Trabzonspor	23	(2)
2014–2015	Sydney FC	24	(16)
2015–2017	Basel	44	(29)
2017–2018	Sparta Prague	5	(1)
2018–2019	Lugano	20	(2)
Total		292	(155)

International career
2006–2019	Austria	70	(28)
- * Club domestic league appearances and goals

Marc Janko (born 25 June 1983) is an Austrian former professional footballer who played as a striker. Janko was a successful goal-scorer, particularly during his time at Austrian Bundesliga club Red Bull Salzburg, where he scored 75 league goals in 108 matches, including 39 goals in 35 matches in the 2009–10 season. He is the son of Eva Janko, who won a bronze medal in the women's Javelin event at the 1968 Summer Olympics in Mexico City.

== Club career ==
=== Red Bull Salzburg ===
Janko began his career at Admira Wacker in Mödling, Lower Austria. After successful years, he joined Red Bull Salzburg. He was one of the most important players for the team, and in the end of the 2004–05 season, he scored 11 goals in 10 matches.

==== 2008–09 season ====
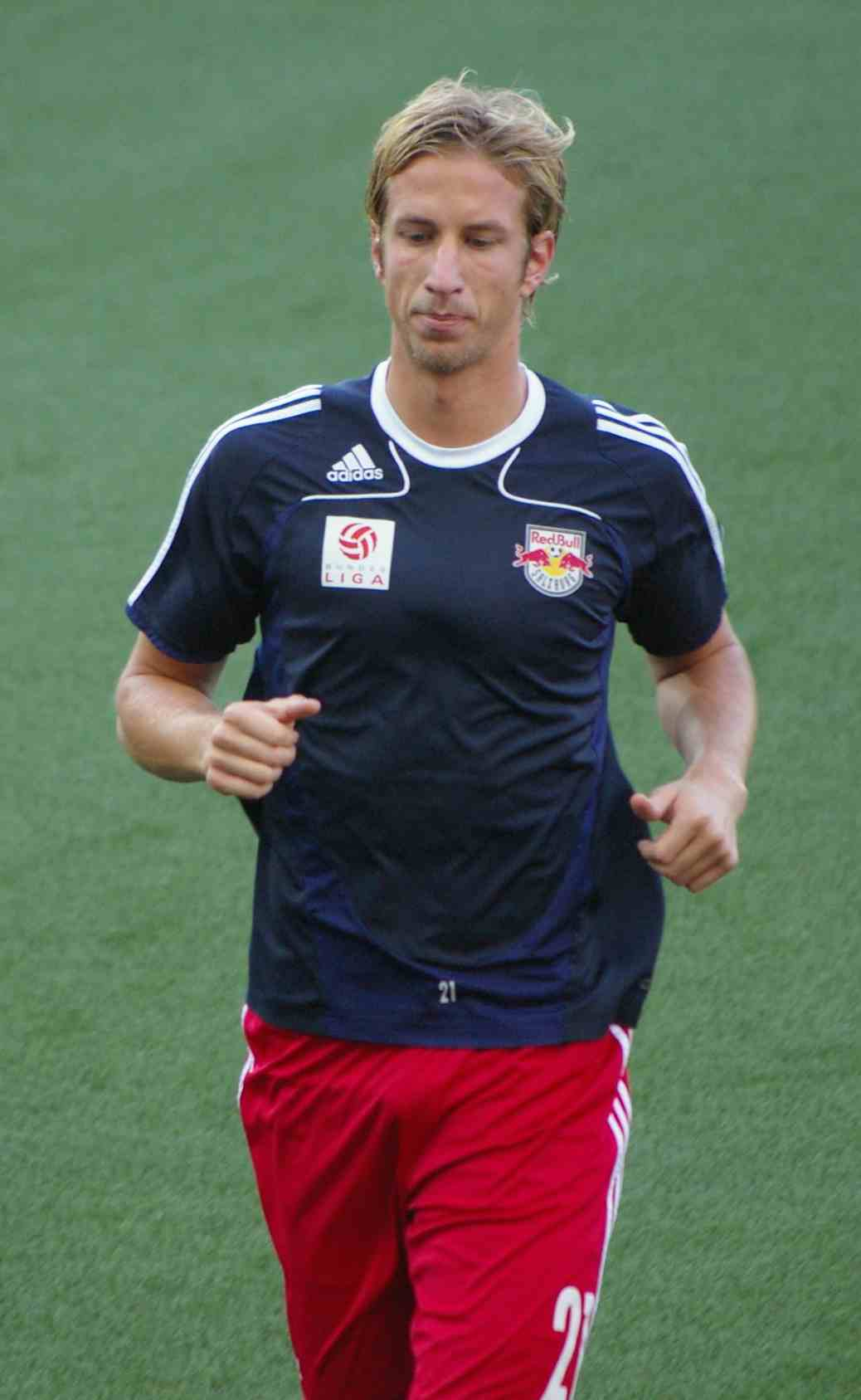
Janko in 2009

Janko began the 2008–09 season scoring five goals in the first two matches. On 16 November 2008, he became the all-time club leader for goals scored in one season for Salzburg. His 25 goals in less than half a season, surpassed previous record-holder Oliver Bierhoff, who scored 23 during the 1990–91 season. Janko continued his scoring streak with a four-goal performance against league rival Altach. On 6 December 2008, he surpassed Toni Polster as the all-time half-season scoring champion by scoring 30 goals in 20 matches.

Janko scored five hat tricks in the league during the season, including a four-goal performance after coming on as a second-half substitute against SCR Altach in a 4–3 victory. In total, he scored 39 goals (plus 9 assists) in 34 matches as Red Bull Salzburg won the league.

Due to his 39 goals scored in the 2008–09 season, he became the topscorer in all European leagues during the year. His success caught the attention of several English Premier League clubs and Celtic. However, he signed a new contract with Red Bull on 30 January 2009, which would have kept him in Salzburg until June 2013.

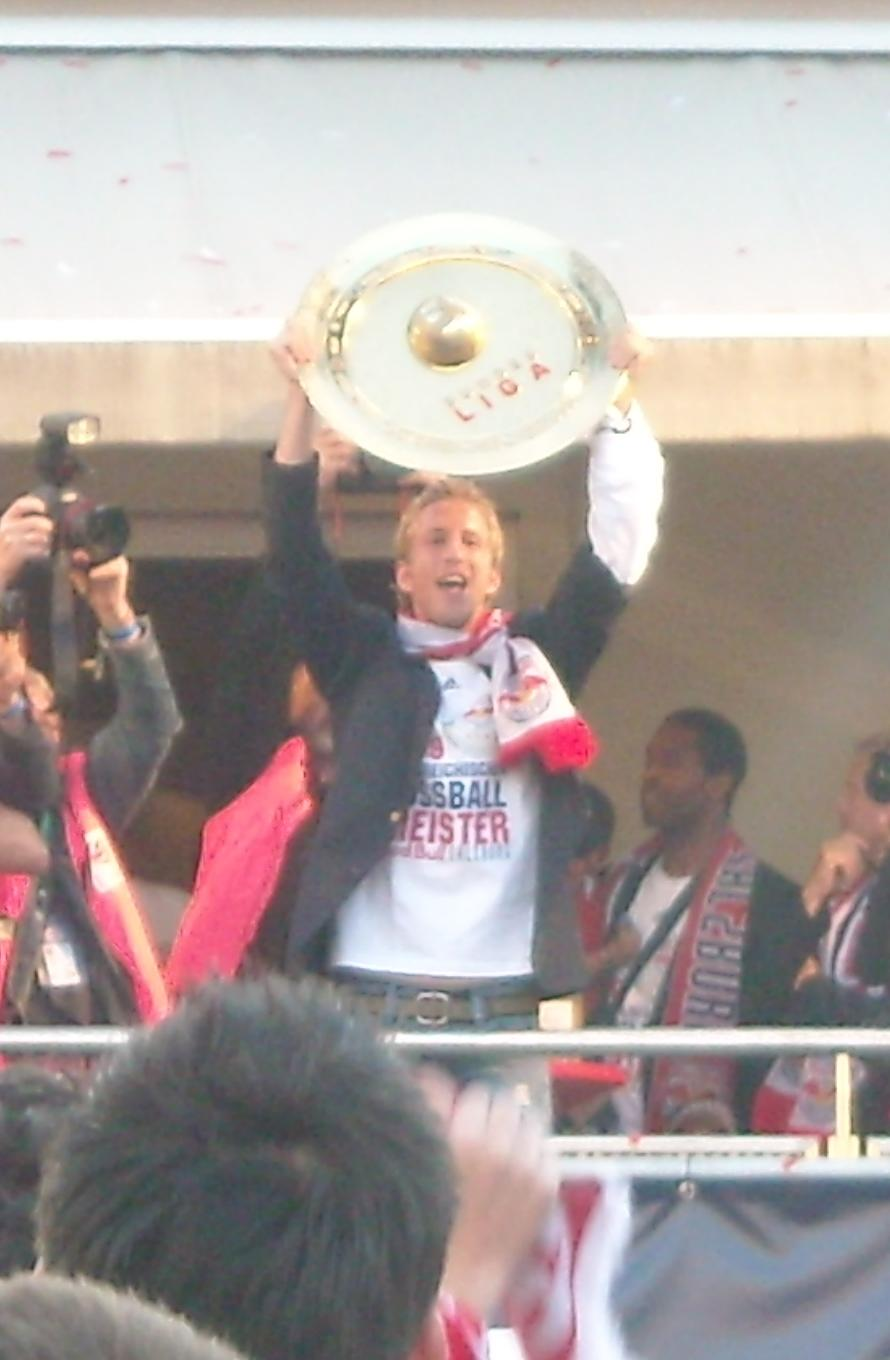
Janko celebrating the win of the Austrian Bundesliga with Salzburg, 2009

==== 2009–10 season ====
Though there were rumors and speculation that Janko would sign with a different club, he stayed with the Red Bulls. In 21 matches that season, Janko scored 12 goals which currently put him in second place in the Bundesliga behind teammate Roman Wallner. His best performances were a four-goal effort against FC Kärnten on 4 October, and a pair of goals scored against Josko Ried on 13 February 2010.

Janko was also an integral part of the Salzburg team that enjoyed success in its pool play in the UEFA Europa League. He had a strong performance against Standard Liège on 19 February 2010, scoring his side's two goals in a 3–2 loss in the first tie of the round of 32.

=== Twente ===
Janko signed a four-year contract with Dutch club Twente on 21 June 2010 and was given the number 21 shirt, previously worn by fellow Austrian Marko Arnautović. Twente paid Red Bull €7 million for Janko's signature.

==== 2010–11 season ====
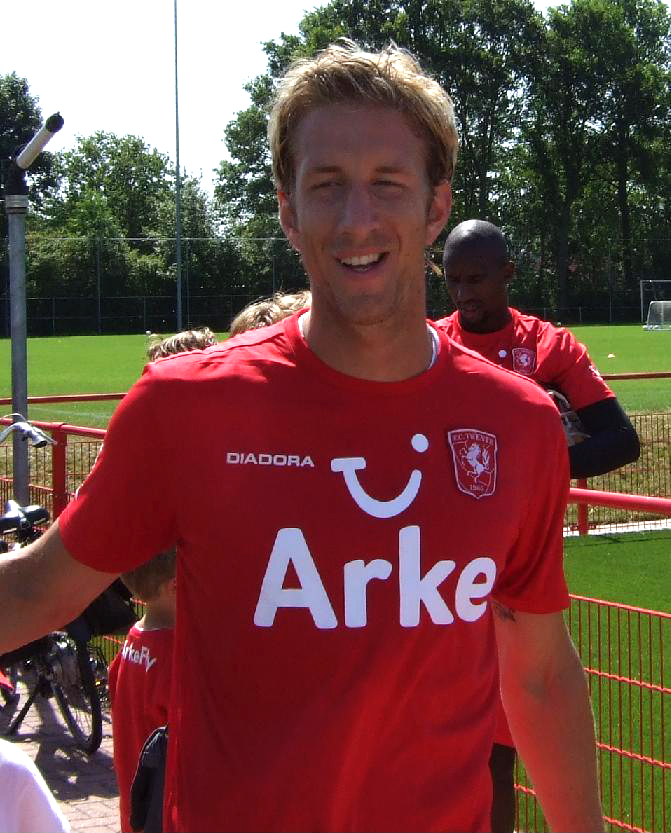
Janko with Twente in 2010

Janko scored his first goal for his new club on 21 August 2010, his side's first in a 3–0 win over Vitesse in the third match of the Eredivisie season. In the club's next Eredivise match, Janko scored a brace and notched an assist as Twente defeated Utrecht 4–0.

Janko scored four goals for Twente in a 5–0 rout of Heracles on 19 January 2011, while also providing an assist for Luuk de Jong's goal. On 23 January, he scored both goals for Twente as they came from a goal down to defeat Groningen. On 8 May 2011, Janko scored the winning goal of the 2011 KNVB Cup final against Ajax in the 117th minute to seal a 3–2 victory.

==== 2011–12 season ====
In the 2011 Johan Cruyff Shield on 30 July 2011, Janko scored from the penalty-spot as Twente defeated reigning Eredivisie champions Ajax 2–1 to lift the cup. In the first match of the 2011–12 Eredivisie season, Janko scored the match's only goal as Twente defeated NAC Breda. Janko scored twice on 28 August, scoring Twente's third and fifth goals as they defeated Heerenveen 5–1. On 29 September, he scored twice to lead Twente to a first victory in the UEFA Europa League, a comfortable 4–1 win over Wisła Kraków.

On 15 October, Janko scored a hat-trick as Twente defeated RKC Waalwijk 4–0 in an Eredivisie match. On 1 December, he scored a goal in the final minute of normal time as Twente defeated Fulham 1–0 to secure first place in Group K of the UEFA Europa League group stage.

=== Porto ===
On 30 January 2012, it was announced that Janko would sign for Porto. On 31 January, Janko was officially unveiled as a Porto player and was given the number 29 shirt, joining in a €3 million move and signing a contract until June 2015. On 5 February, he scored his first goal for Porto against Vitória de Setúbal in the Taça de Portugal, a 2–0 win.

=== Trabzonspor ===
On 28 August 2012, after just half a year at Porto, Janko signed for Turkish club Trabzonspor for a €2.4 million transfer fee. He made his debut for the club five days later, coming on for Paulo Henrique in the second half of a 0–1 loss to Gaziantepspor. Janko finally scored his first goal for Trabzonspor on 19 November, opening the scoring for the club in their 2–1 victory over Orduspor.

Janko scored his first goal of the 2013–14 season on 24 October 2013, scoring Trabzonspor's goal in a 2–0 victory over Legia Warsaw in the UEFA Europa League group stage. On 4 December, he scored against Balıkesirspor in the fourth round of the Turkish Cup, but the goal was not enough as Trabzonspor fell to a 1–3 defeat. He scored just his second league goal during his time in Turkey on 23 February 2014, scoring the match winner against Kayserispor. At the end of the season, Janko was released from his contract, allowing the forward to move to a new club on a free transfer.

=== Sydney FC ===
On 31 July 2014, Janko was announced as Sydney FC's new marquee signing for the 2014–15 A-League season, on a one-year deal, meaning his wages were permitted to be paid outside the league's salary cap. On 30 August, he scored his first goal for Sydney during the final of the inaugural Townsville Football Cup in a 2–0 win against Brisbane Roar. On 24 October, he scored his first A-League goal, against Brisbane Roar in a 2–0 victory. His 35-yard shot bounced into the top left corner to give Sydney a 1–0 lead. Janko scored his next two goals in the form of a brace against Melbourne City, after having turned down the opportunity to play for the Austria national team against Brazil. He scored another two goals in Sydney's 5–1 rout of Central Coast Mariners on 24 January 2015. Janko was awarded the Professional Footballers Australia Player of the Month for February following a run of six goals in four matches during the month. Janko scored his first hat-trick for Sydney in their 5–4 win against Brisbane Roar on matchday 21 at Allianz Stadium in rather inclement conditions. His hat-trick also saw him become Sydney's highest season goalscorer with 16 goals (previously held by Alessandro Del Piero during the 2012–13 A-League season with 14). In addition, Janko became the first ever player to score in seven consecutive matches, the previous record being held by ex-Brisbane Roar player Besart Berisha with six. On 26 May 2015 it was announced that Janko would be leaving Sydney due to difficulties with attending league matches and international duty.

=== Basel ===
On 25 June 2015, it was announced that Janko joined Swiss side Basel on a free transfer, signing a one-year deal, with an option for a furtheryear. He joined Basel's first team for their 2015–16 season under head coach Urs Fischer. After playing in one test game, Janko played his domestic league debut for the club in the away game in the Letzigrund, in Zürich, on 25 July 2015. He also scored his first goal for the team in the same game as Basel won 3–2 against Grasshopper. Janko scored a hat-trick in the home game in the St. Jakob-Park on 13 March 2016 as Basel won 4–2 against St. Gallen. Under trainer Fischer, Janko won the Swiss Super League championship at the end of the 2015–16 Super League season. For the club it was the seventh title in a row and their 19th championship title in total.

In summary, Janko scored 16 goals and gave two assists in 20 league games in his first season for the Swiss club. He was third in the scorers list behind Guillaume Hoarau (18 goals) and Mu'nas Dabbur (19 goals). Janko led the scorer list for a long time. However, he tore a muscle fiber in mid-April 2016 and missed the rest of the season due to injury. In addition, the striker reached the last 16 of the 2015–16 Europa League with Basel, scoring two goals and giving two assists in that competition. The contract option was met and Janko stayed another year with the club.

At the start of the 2016–17 Super League season, FCB strengthened their attacking formation, signing Ivorian player Seydou Doumbia from AS Roma. The two strikers were used alternately throughout the season. At the end of Basel's 2016–17 season, Janko won the championship with the club for the second time. For the club this was the eighth title in a row and their 20th championship title in total. They also won the 2016–17 Swiss Cup, defeating Sion 3–0 in the final.

The contract between Basel and Janko was not extended by the club and he left FCB at the end of the season. During his two seasons with the club, Janko played a total of 76 games for Basel scoring a total of 37 goals. 44 of these games were in the Swiss Super League, five in the Swiss Cup, 17 in the UEFA competitions (Champions League and Europa League) and ten were friendly games. He scored 29 goals in the domestic league, five in the cup, three in the UEFA competitions and the other three were scored during the test games.

=== Sparta Prague ===
On 6 June 2017, Janko signed a two-year contract with Czech club Sparta Prague.

=== Lugano ===
On 6 February 2018, Janko signed a contract with Swiss club FC Lugano.

== International career ==
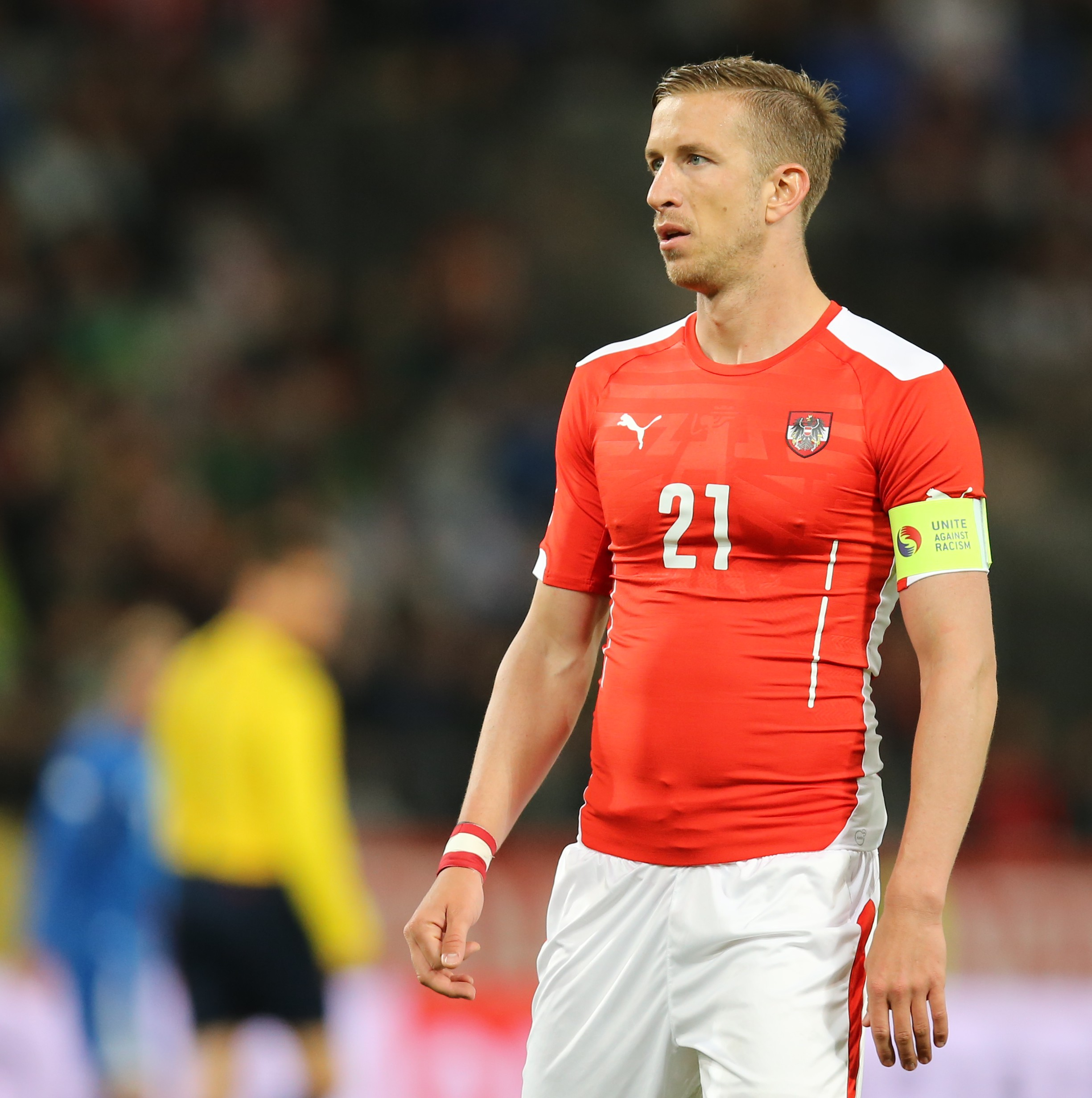
Janko in a match for Austria against Iceland in 2014

Janko made his debut for Austria in a May 2006 friendly match against Croatia and earned his second cap in October that year against Liechtenstein. In 2009, he scored one of Austria's two goals against Lithuania on 10 October 2009. Four days later, he scored Austria's lone goal against France.

He represented the national team at 2016 UEFA Euro.

== Career statistics ==
=== Club ===
Appearances and goals by club, season and competition
Club	Season	League			Cup		Continental		Other		Total	
Club	Season	Division	Apps	Goals	Apps	Goals	Apps	Goals	Apps	Goals	Apps	Goals
Admira Wacker	2004–05	Austrian Bundesliga	13	2	0	0	—		—		13	2
Red Bull Salzburg	2005–06	Austrian Bundesliga	18	11	0	0	—		—		18	11
Red Bull Salzburg	2006–07	Austrian Bundesliga	8	2	0	0	3	1	—		11	3
Red Bull Salzburg	2007–08	Austrian Bundesliga	14	5	0	0	0	0	—		14	5
Red Bull Salzburg	2008–09	Austrian Bundesliga	34	39	1	1	3	2	—		38	42
Red Bull Salzburg	2009–10	Austrian Bundesliga	34	18	0	0	11	4	—		45	22
Red Bull Salzburg	Total		108	75	1	1	17	7	—		126	83
Twente	2010–11	Eredivisie	29	14	4	2	9	1	—		42	17
Twente	2011–12	Eredivisie	16	10	2	2	8	5	1 (Note: Appearance in Dutch Super Cup)	1	27	18
Twente	Total		45	24	6	4	17	6	1	1	69	35
Porto	2011–12	Primeira Liga	10	4	0	0	0	0	2 (Note: Two appearances in Taça da Liga)	1	12	5
Trabzonspor	2012–13	Süper Lig	14	1	3	0	0	0	—		17	1
Trabzonspor	2013–14	Süper Lig	9	1	1	1	3	1	—		13	3
Trabzonspor	Total		23	2	4	1	3	1	0	0	30	4
Sydney FC	2014–15	A-League	22	16	1	0	—		2 (Note: Two appearances in Finals series)	0	25	16
Basel	2015–16	Swiss Super League	20	16	1	1	12	3	—		33	20
Basel	2016–17	Swiss Super League	24	13	4	1	5	0	—		33	14
Basel	Total		44	29	5	2	17	3	—		66	34
Sparta Prague	2017–18	Czech First League	5	1	1	1	2	0	—		8	2
Lugano	2017–18	Swiss Super League	12	2	0	0	—		—		12	2
Lugano	2018–19	Swiss Super League	8	0	3	1	—		—		11	1
Lugano	Total		20	2	3	1	0	0	0	0	23	3
Career total			290	155	21	10	56	17	5	2	372	184

=== International ===
National team	Year	Apps	Goals
Austria	2006	2	0
Austria	2007	0	0
Austria	2008	5	3
Austria	2009	7	4
Austria	2010	4	0
Austria	2011	6	3
Austria	2012	7	3
Austria	2013	6	3
Austria	2014	6	2
Austria	2015	7	7
Austria	2016	11	3
Austria	2017	5	0
Austria	2018	2	0
Austria	2019	2	0
Total		70	28

=== International goals ===
Scores and results list Austria's goal tally first.

#	Date	Venue	Opponent	Score	Result	Competition
1.	20 August 2008	Stade du Ray, Nice, France	Italy	2–0	2–2	Friendly
2.	6 September 2008	Ernst-Happel-Stadion, Vienna, Austria	France	1–0	3–1	2010 World Cup qualification
3.	15 October 2008	Ernst-Happel-Stadion, Vienna, Austria	Serbia	1–3	1–3	2010 World Cup qualification
4.	5 September 2009	UPC-Arena, Graz, Austria	Faroe Islands	2–0	3–1	2010 World Cup qualification
5.	5 September 2009	UPC-Arena, Graz, Austria	Faroe Islands	3–0	3–1	2010 World Cup qualification
6.	10 October 2009	Tivoli-Neu, Innsbruck, Austria	Lithuania	1–0	2–1	2010 World Cup qualification
7.	14 October 2009	Stade de France, Saint-Denis, France	France	1–2	1–3	2010 World Cup qualification
8.	7 October 2011	Dalga Arena, Baku, Azerbaijan	Azerbaijan	2–0	4–1	Euro 2012 qualifying
9.	7 October 2011	Dalga Arena, Baku, Azerbaijan	Azerbaijan	3–0	4–1	Euro 2012 qualifying
10.	15 November 2011	Arena Lviv, Lviv, Ukraine	Ukraine	1–1	1–2	Friendly
11.	29 February 2012	Hypo-Arena, Klagenfurt, Austria	Finland	1–0	3–1	Friendly
12.	16 October 2012	Ernst-Happel-Stadion, Vienna, Austria	Kazakhstan	1–0	4–0	2014 World Cup qualification
13.	16 October 2012	Ernst-Happel-Stadion, Vienna, Austria	Kazakhstan	2–0	4–0	2014 World Cup qualification
14.	6 February 2013	Liberty Stadium, Swansea, Wales	Wales	1–2	1–2	Friendly
15.	7 June 2013	Ernst-Happel-Stadion, Vienna, Austria	Sweden	2–0	2–1	
16.	19 November 2013	Ernst-Happel-Stadion, Vienna, Austria	United States	1–0	1–0	Friendly
17.	5 March 2014	Wörtherseestadion, Klagenfurt, Austria	Uruguay	1–0	1–1	Friendly
18.	9 October 2014	Zimbru Stadium, Chișinău, Moldova	Moldova	2–1	2–1	Euro 2016 qualifying
19.	27 March 2015	Rheinpark Stadion, Vaduz, Liechtenstein	Liechtenstein	2–0	5–0	Euro 2016 qualifying
20.	31 March 2015	Ernst-Happel-Stadion, Vienna, Austria	Bosnia and Herzegovina	1–0	1–1	Friendly
21.	14 June 2015	Otkrytie Arena, Moscow, Russia	Russia	1–0	1–0	Euro 2016 qualifying
22.	8 September 2015	Friends Arena, Solna, Sweden	Sweden	3–0	4–1	Euro 2016 qualifying
23.	9 October 2015	Podgorica City Stadium, Podgorica, Montenegro	Montenegro	1–1	3–2	Euro 2016 qualifying
24.	12 October 2015	Ernst-Happel-Stadion, Vienna, Austria	Liechtenstein	2–0	3–0	Euro 2016 qualifying
25.	12 October 2015	Ernst-Happel-Stadion, Vienna, Austria	Liechtenstein	3–0	3–0	Euro 2016 qualifying
26.	26 March 2016	Ernst-Happel-Stadion, Vienna, Austria	Albania	1–0	2–1	Friendly
27.	5 September 2016	Boris Paichadze Dinamo Arena, Tbilisi, Georgia	Georgia	2–0	2–1	2018 World Cup qualification
28.	9 October 2016	Red Star Stadium, Belgrade, Serbia	Serbia	2–2	2–3	2018 World Cup qualification

== Honours ==
=== Club ===
Red Bull Salzburg

- Austrian Bundesliga: 2006–07, 2008–09, 2009–10

Twente

- KNVB Cup: 2010–11
- Johan Cruyff Shield: 2011

Porto

- Primeira Liga: 2011–12

Basel

- Swiss Super League: 2015–16, 2016–17
- Swiss Cup: 2016–17

=== Individual ===
- Austrian Football Bundesliga Topscorer: 2008–09
- Professional Footballers Australia Player of the Month: February 2015
- A-League Golden Boot: 2014–15
- A-League PFA Team of the Season: 2014–15
- Sydney FC Team of the Decade: 2015

=== Records ===
- Most goals for Sydney FC in a league season: 16
- Most consecutive Sydney FC goalscoring appearances: 7
