= James Yorke =

James Yorke may refer to:

- James A. Yorke (born 1941), American mathematician
- James Yorke (bishop) (1730–1808), British Church of England bishop
- James Yorke (figure skater) (1962–2008), American ice dancer
- James Yorke (writer) (fl. 1640), English heraldic writer

== See also ==
- James Yorke Scarlett (1799–1871), British general in the Crimea War
- James York (disambiguation)
