= Thomas Yorke =

Thomas Yorke or York may refer to:

- Thomas Yorke (1658–1716), English politician
- Thomas Yorke (1688–1768), English businessman and MP for Richmond, Yorkshire
- Thomas Jones Yorke (1801–1882), American politician
- Thom Yorke (born 1968), English musician
- Tom Yorke, rugby league player
- Thomas York (Australian politician) (1850–1910), New South Wales politician

== See also ==
- Tom York (disambiguation)
