= Ernest York =

English footballer

Personal information
- Place of birth: Moulton, England
- Date of death: 28 April 1917
- Place of death: Salonika, Kingdom of Greece
- Position(s): Full back

Senior career*
Years	Team	Apps	(Gls)
–1912	Kettering		
1912–1915	Crystal Palace	58	(6)
- * Club domestic league appearances and goals

Ernest York (died 28 April 1917) was an English professional footballer who played as a full back in the Southern Football League for Crystal Palace.

== Personal life ==
York served as a private in the Royal Berkshire Regiment during the First World War and was killed in action at Salonika on 28 April 1917. He is commemorated on the Doiran Memorial.

== Career statistics ==
Appearances and goals by club, season and competition
Club	Season	Division	League		FA Cup		Total	
Club	Season	Division	Apps	Goals	Apps	Goals	Apps	Goals
Crystal Palace	1914–15	Southern League First Division	17	2	0	0	17	2
Career total			17	2	0	0	17	2
