= Steve Corica =

Australian soccer player and manager (born 1973)

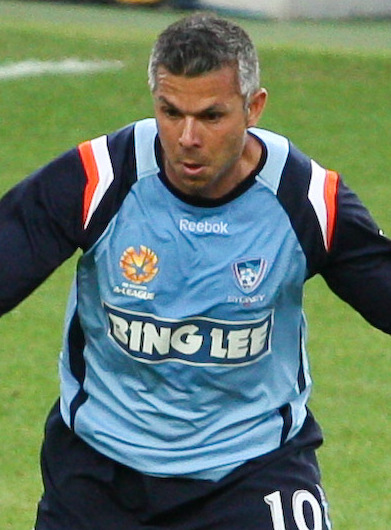
- Corica playing for Sydney FC in 2008

Personal information
- Full name: Stephen Christopher Corica
- Date of birth: 24 March 1973 (age 53)
- Place of birth: Innisfail, Queensland, Australia
- Height: 1.74 m (5 ft 9 in)
- Position: Midfielder

Youth career
- Innisfail United
- 1990: AIS

Senior career*
| Years | Team | Apps | (Gls) |
| 1990–1995 | Marconi Stallions | 103 | (14) |
| 1995–1996 | Leicester City | 16 | (2) |
| 1996–2000 | Wolverhampton Wanderers | 100 | (5) |
| 2000–2001 | Sanfrecce Hiroshima | 43 | (14) |
| 2002–2004 | Walsall | 73 | (9) |
| 2005–2010 | Sydney FC | 106 | (23) |
| Total | | 441 | (67) |

International career
| 1989 | Australia U-17 | 2 | (1) |
| 1990–1991 | Australia U-20 | 6 | (0) |
| 1992–1996 | Australia U-23 | 7 | (0) |
| 1993–2006 | Australia | 32 | (5) |

Managerial career
- 2010–2011: Sydney FC Youth
- 2012: Sydney FC (caretaker)
- 2018–2023: Sydney FC
- 2024–2026: Auckland FC
- 2026–: Yokohama F. Marinos
Medal record
Men's association football
Representing Australia
FIFA Confederations Cup
| Third place | 2001 Japan–South Korea |
OFC Nations Cup
| Winner | 2000 Tahiti |
AFC–OFC Challenge Cup
| Runner-up | 2001 Japan |
- * Club domestic league appearances and goals

Stephen Christopher Corica (/ˈkɒrɪkə/; born 24 March 1973) is an Australian soccer manager and former player. He is currently the head coach of J.League side Yokohama F. Marinos.

A technically gifted and skillful attacking midfielder during his playing career, he represented Australia 32 times and captained Sydney FC to a domestic double. Since retiring in 2010, he was an assistant and youth coach at Sydney FC, before being appointed Head Coach in May 2018. During his managing tenure, Corica was Sydney FC's longest-serving manager, winning one A-League premiership, two championships, and one Australia Cup.

== Club career ==
=== Early career ===
Corica started playing football in his home town of Innisfail, in Far North Queensland and joining the elite player program at the Australian Institute of Sport in 1990.

=== Marconi Stallions ===
On completion of the scholarship Corica signed with Marconi-Fairfield in the now defunct National Soccer League. In his first NSL season he made just three starts, but developed to a regular selection in following years. In 1992–93 he helped Marconi to a grand final win and was named Under 21 Player of the Year. The next two years were less successful for the Marconi and in 1995, Corica sought a career move to Europe.

=== England (Leicester City and Wolves) ===
Corica signed with Leicester City in the English First Division (now the EFL Championship). He debuted for the club on 12 August 1995 and scored in a 2–1 win. Adding to his tally was harder to come by for following games, and in February, Corica and fellow Australian Zeljko Kalac were signed by their former Leicester manager Mark McGhee for Wolverhampton Wanderers in a joint £1.75 million deal (the component for Corica was £1.1 million). Kalac was unable to gain a work permit for Wolves and returned to Australia, but Corica remained. In four-and-a-half seasons at Wolves, Corica made over 100 appearances, although hampered by a series of knee injuries.

=== Sanfrecce Hiroshima ===
Corica left Wolves in 2000, moving to Japan with J1 League side Sanfrecce Hiroshima for two seasons, then returning to England at Walsall. In September 2004, unable to work his way into the first team, Walsall agreed to release him.

=== Sydney FC ===
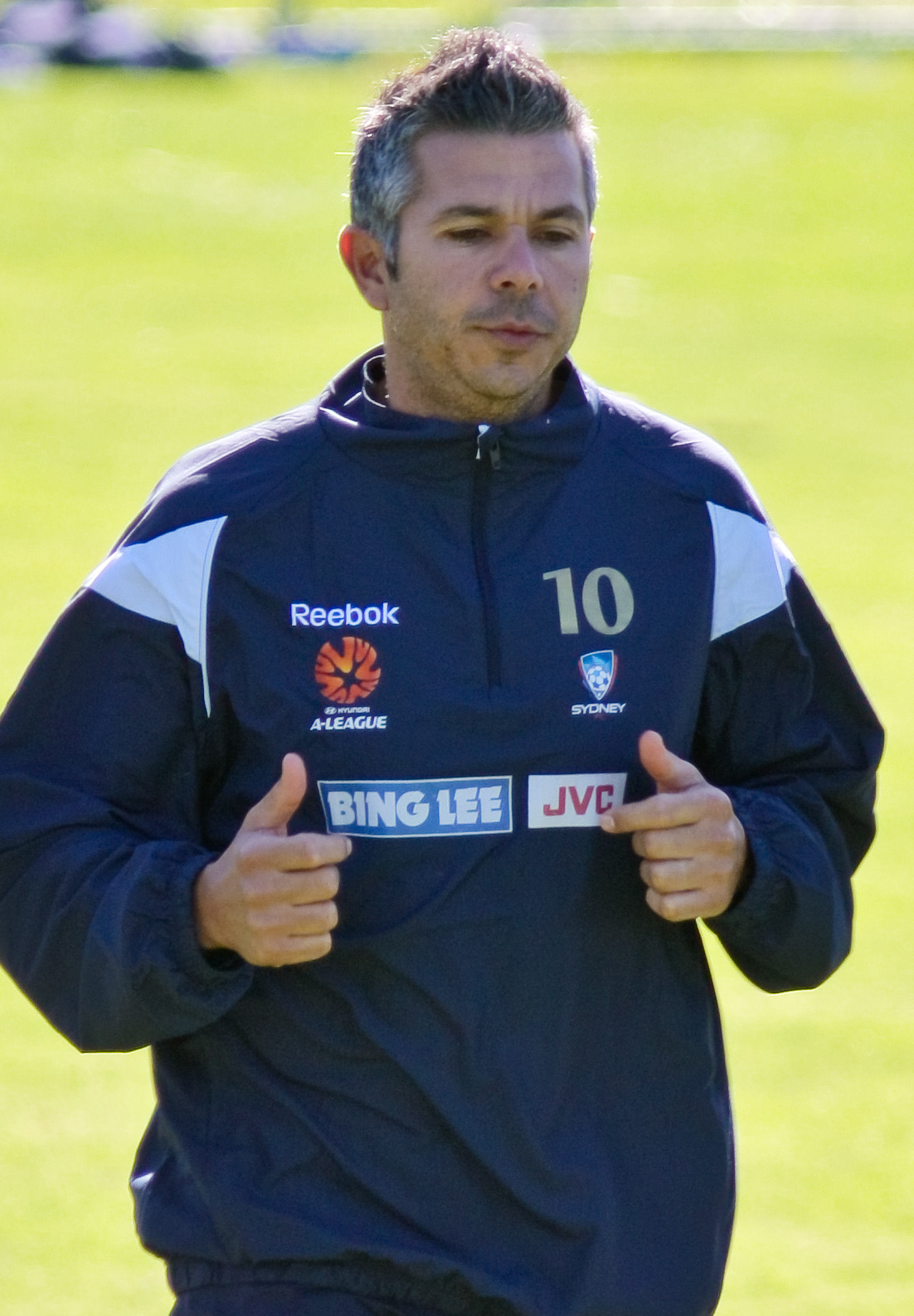
Corica training for Sydney in 2009

Corica finally decided to return home to Australia after spending 10 years abroad, joining new A-League club Sydney FC. Corica was sent off in Sydney's third A-League match against Newcastle for a dangerous foul. After serving a one match suspension, he scored just five minutes in against Queensland Roar, and following up with a second goal later in the match. Corica retained a place in the side for much of the year as Sydney progressed to the Grand Final. A set-up from Dwight Yorke in the second half, gave Corica the only goal in Sydney FC's 1–0 victory over the Central Coast Mariners to help the team win the inaugural A-League Championship.

He remained with the club in 2006–07 and 2007–08 seasons, playing a key role in Sydney's 2007 Asian Champions League campaign, scoring four goals in six matches. On 1 April 2008, he signed a one-year contract to remain at Sydney. Corica scored a double in the round two match against Central Coast Mariners. He became Sydney's highest goalscorer after overtaking Sasho Petrovski's former record of 14, with a penalty in Sydney's 5–2 win over Perth Glory. He became Sydney's 3rd player to reach 100 professional games for the club, with their 2–1 loss to Perth Glory on 19 November 2008 at Members Equity Stadium. On 11 February 2010, he announced his retirement at the end of the season.

On the final day of the regular season in the 2009–10 season against Melbourne Victory, Corica limped off in the 20th minute due to a suspected injury. Sydney went on to win the game 2–0 and claimed the Premiership. After later examination of his injury, it was discovered that he had torn his hamstring muscle off the bone and required surgery thus ending his season. He then announced his full retirement from professional football.

== International career ==
Corica represented Australia at all youth (U17, U20, U23) and at national team level, the first Australian to achieve the feat.

He represented Australia at the FIFA U-17 World Championship in Scotland in 1989. Although his team finished last in a very tough group, he did have his moments, such as scoring against Brazil in a 3–1 loss. In 1991, he was selected for the FIFA World Youth Championship in Portugal, where Australia performed remarkably well and reached the semi-finals before losing to the hosts. He then went on to play in two Olympic Games football tournament, the first being the 1992 Olympics in Barcelona, where Australia made another impressive run to the semi-finals, this time falling to Poland at the penultimate stage. Four years later, he was part of the 1996 Olympics team in Atlanta. He was part of a generation of Australian players (including Paul Okon, Ned Zelic, Mark Bosnich and Zeljko Kalac) dubbed the "Golden Generation".

On 16 April 1993, Corica was given his full national team debut by Eddie Thomson (former national coach) against Kuwait in a friendly match in Singapore. He then went on to play for the national team, earning over 40 caps (some in non-'A' internationals) and scoring 6 goals including appearances at the 1997 and 2001 Confederations Cups. After a five-year absence from the national team, he appeared in an Asia Cup qualifier against Kuwait on 16 August 2006 as one of eight Sydney FC players called up to the national team.

== Managerial career ==
=== Sydney FC ===
==== Sydney FC youth ====
Corica took over as coach for the Sydney FC National Youth League team from the 2010–11 season.

It was announced in July 2011, that Corica would become one of two Assistant Coaches to Manager Vitezslav Lavicka, along with Ian Crook, who was the assistant coach at Sydney FC, under Pierre Littbarski during Sydney FC's Inaugural season, in which they won the 2005–06 Championship.

In 2012, Corica acted as caretaker coach of Sydney FC, after the resignation of Ian Crook and until the hiring of replacement Frank Farina.

In the 2013–14 season Corica became Head Coach of the Sydney FC National Youth League once again guiding them to the Championship in a stellar season. He continued in this role in 2014–15 but towards the end of the NYL season in which Sydney FC finished fourth he was drafted into the role of Assistant Coach to Graham Arnold with the Sydney FC A-League team where they finished runners up in the Premiership and Grand Final. From 2015 to May 2018, Corica continued as the Assistant Coach to Graham Arnold on a full-time basis.

==== A-League Men ====
2018–19 season

On 16 May 2018, following Graham Arnold's appointment by the Australian national team, Corica was appointed the Head Coach of Sydney FC's senior team. His first season coaching the Sydney FC club was a success, with Sydney FC narrowly missing out on winning the league, however would go on to beat Premiers Perth Glory in the 2019 A-League Grand Final. During that match, Corica was given a yellow card due to arguing with the referee.

2019–20 season

Corica would continue to deliver success for Sydney the following season, during a COVID ravaged 2019–20 season. Having recruited strongly during the offseason, including Kosta Barbarouses from Melbourne Victory, Alexander Baumjohann from Western Sydney, and Luke Brattan from Melbourne City. Sydney would go on to win the league a record-breaking fourth time by a seemingly comfortable 6 points, despite being winless in their last 5 games, which was attributed to the long season and COVID hangover as a result of the league being suspended in March, with the final games being played mostly behind closed doors due to the COVID-19 pandemic in Australia.

Due to COVID restrictions, the finals series was held Bankwest Stadium in Parramatta in front of capacity restricted crowds. Corica would steer Sydney to a comfortable 2–0 victory over the previous season's Grand Finalist Perth Glory, before defeating Melbourne City 1–0 in the Grand Final, courtesy of a 100th minute Extra time goal by Rhyan Grant, giving Sydney its record breaking 5th A-League finals trophy.

2020–21 season

Due to restrictions in international travel and border closures associated with the COVID-19 pandemic, Corica was unable to make too many changes to the overall squad, however welcomed back Adam Le Fondre from his loan at Mumbai City, and Brazilian fan-favourite Bobô. The season was yet again heavily disrupted by the pandemic, with the 2020 FFA Cup being cancelled, as well as the club withdrawing from the 2021 AFC Champions League which was being held in Uzbekistan.

Sydney would perform strongly, and narrowly miss out on its fifth Premiers Plate at the hands of Melbourne City who won by two points. The 2021 A-League Grand Final would be a re-match of the previous seasons, however this time Melbourne City won comfortably defeating Sydney 3–1 at AAMI Park in Melbourne.

2021–22 season

Going into the 21–22 season, Corica would not change the structure of the team except for a few tweaks, re-signing the bulk of the existing squad. The team would have a poor start to the season, not winning its first game until Round 5, an unconvincing 2–1 win over Wellington Phoenix. Poor and inconsistent form would plague the team throughout the season as Corica struggled to string wins together. The club would qualify for 2022 AFC Champions League group stage after a 5–0 victory over Philippines Football League club Kaya F.C.–Iloilo, however the continental tournament which was being held in Vietnam would be a disaster as Sydney failed to win a single group game, finishing last. The poor form would continue once the team returned to Australia to see out the remainder of the 21–22 league season losing its remaining 2 games. As a result, the club missed out on the finals series for the first time since the 2015–16 season.

2022–23 season

Despite the club having its worst season in 6 years Corica was handed a 2-year extension on his contract, with the promise of guiding Sydney back into silverware contention as the club moved back to the Sydney Football Stadium following a hiatus while the stadium was re-built. However the season would be plagued with controversy, as star player and fan-favourite Milos Ninkovic publicly declared that he would be leaving the club on less than acrimonious terms and sign with direct rivals Western Sydney Wanderers. To add further insult to injury it was announced that club academy player Calem Nieuwenhof would also be departing the club and heading to the Wanderers without being offered a contract. Corica responded strongly by bringing in Slovak international Róbert Mak, and English Premier League winger Joe Lolley, the latter being the first transfer fee being paid in the clubs history. Controversially, Corica also signed former Sunderland player Jack Rodwell from the Wanderers, despite his injury issues being well known. Sydney would start the season in disappointing fashion, slumping to a 3–2 loss to Melbourne Victory on the opening day of the season, with Center Back pairing Rodwell and Wilkinson both out injured.

Throughout the season, Corica struggled to maintain consistent form and the technical issues that were highlighted from the previous season had not seemingly been resolved as the club struggled to stay within finals contention. The season would reach an ultimate low point during the final derby of the season against the Wanderers as Sydney crashed to a 4–0 defeat, with former players Ninkovic and Nieuwenhof being involved with all the goals. The humiliating result led to an increase in calls from supporters for Corica to step down or for the board to sack him, calls which had been simmering since the prior season.

2023–24 season

Corica started his sixth season in change of Sydney FC strongly, winning the 2023 Australia Cup, defeating Brisbane Roar in the final 3–1, with new signing Fábio Gomes scoring twice.

On 7 November 2023, it was announced that Corica had left Sydney FC, having lost the opening three games of the 2023–24 season, with his Sydney side failing to score a goal in the process.

=== Auckland FC ===
==== 2024–25 ====
Six weeks after departing Sydney FC, newly announced A-League expansion club Auckland FC announced Corica as their inaugural manager for the 2024–25 season. He joined former Sydney FC team-mate and Hall of Fame inductee Terry McFlynn, who was signed as the club's Director of Football.

Corica led Auckland FC to the first piece of silverware in the club's history during its inaugural season, guiding the side to the A-League Men Premiership and becoming the first New Zealand club to win the title. Auckland finished the regular season with a record of 15 wins, eight draws and three losses. Corica also led the club into its first A-League Men finals series, where Auckland was eliminated by Melbourne Victory in the semi-finals, losing 2–1 on aggregate.

Corica was named A-League Coach of the Year at the 2025 Dolan Warren Awards, in recognition of his Premiership-winning season in charge of the Black Knights.

==== 2025–26 ====
On 11 April 2026, Corica received the first red card of his managerial career during a 2–2 draw with Melbourne Victory. As a result, he was suspended for Auckland FC's following match against Central Coast Mariners.

Corica later guided Auckland FC to the second major trophy in the club's history, winning the A-League Men Championship following a successful finals campaign. In the 2026 Grand Final, Auckland defeated Corica's former club, Sydney FC, 1–0 at Mount Smart Stadium, becoming the first New Zealand club to win the A-League Men Championship.

On 19 June 2026, it was announced that Corica would depart Auckland FC to pursue overseas opportunities.

=== Yokohama F. Marinos ===
Steve Corica as Yokohama F. Marinos manager in 2026

On 21 June, Corica was revealed as the head coach of J.League side Yokohama F. Marinos, becoming the fifth Australian coach at the club following stints from Ange Postecoglou, Kevin Muscat, Harry Kewell, and Patrick Kisnorbo.

On 7 August 2026, Corica took charge of his first competitive match at the club in the opening round of the 2026–27 J1 League season, losing 3–4 to reigning champions Kashima Antlers at MUFG Stadium.

== Career statistics ==
=== Club ===
Appearances and goals by club, season and competition
| Club | Season | League | | | National cup | | League cup | | Continental | | Total | |
| Club | Season | Division | Apps | Goals | Apps | Goals | Apps | Goals | Apps | Goals | Apps | Goals |
|---|---|---|---|---|---|---|---|---|---|---|---|---|
| Marconi Stallions | 1990–91 | National Soccer League | 17 | 0 | – | | – | | – | | 17 | 0 |
| Marconi Stallions | 1991–92 | National Soccer League | 17 | 2 | – | | – | | – | | 17 | 2 |
| Marconi Stallions | 1992–93 | National Soccer League | 27 | 4 | – | | – | | – | | 27 | 4 |
| Marconi Stallions | 1993–94 | National Soccer League | 24 | 4 | – | | – | | – | | 24 | 4 |
| Marconi Stallions | 1994–95 | National Soccer League | 18 | 3 | – | | – | | – | | 18 | 3 |
| Marconi Stallions | Total | | 103 | 13 | – | – | – | – | – | – | 103 | 13 |
| Leicester City | 1995–96 | First Division | 16 | 2 | 2 | 0 | 0 | 0 | – | | 18 | 2 |
| Wolverhampton Wanderers | 1995–96 | First Division | 17 | 0 | 1 | 0 | 0 | 0 | – | | 18 | 0 |
| Wolverhampton Wanderers | 1996–97 | First Division | 36 | 2 | 2 | 0 | 4 | 0 | – | | 42 | 2 |
| Wolverhampton Wanderers | 1997–98 | First Division | 1 | 0 | 0 | 0 | 0 | 0 | – | | 1 | 0 |
| Wolverhampton Wanderers | 1998–99 | First Division | 31 | 2 | 1 | 0 | 1 | 0 | – | | 33 | 2 |
| Wolverhampton Wanderers | 1999–2000 | First Division | 15 | 1 | 0 | 0 | 1 | 0 | – | | 16 | 1 |
| Wolverhampton Wanderers | Total | | 100 | 5 | 4 | 0 | 6 | 0 | – | | 110 | 5 |
| Sanfrecce Hiroshima | 2000 | J1 League | 21 | 3 | 2 | 2 | 2 | 1 | – | – | 25 | 6 |
| Sanfrecce Hiroshima | 2001 | J1 League | 22 | 11 | 2 | 1 | 1 | 0 | – | – | 25 | 12 |
| Sanfrecce Hiroshima | Total | | 43 | 14 | 4 | 3 | 3 | 1 | – | | 50 | 18 |
| Walsall | 2001–02 | First Division | 13 | 3 | 0 | 0 | 0 | 0 | – | – | 13 | 3 |
| Walsall | 2002–03 | First Division | 41 | 4 | 2 | 0 | 3 | 0 | – | – | 46 | 4 |
| Walsall | 2003–04 | First Division | 19 | 2 | 2 | 0 | 2 | 0 | – | – | 23 | 2 |
| Walsall | 2004–05 | League One | 0 | 0 | 0 | 0 | 0 | 0 | – | – | 0 | 0 |
| Walsall | Total | | 73 | 9 | 4 | 0 | 5 | 0 | – | | 82 | 9 |
| Sydney FC | 2005–06 | A-League | 21 | 5 | 4 | 1 | – | | 5 | 3 | 30 | 9 |
| Sydney FC | 2006–07 | A-League | 18 | 3 | 5 | 0 | – | | 6 | 4 | 29 | 7 |
| Sydney FC | 2007–08 | A-League | 20 | 4 | 2 | 0 | – | | – | | 22 | 4 |
| Sydney FC | 2008–09 | A-League | 21 | 4 | 3 | 0 | – | | – | | 24 | 4 |
| Sydney FC | 2009–10 | A-League | 26 | 7 | – | – | – | | – | | 26 | 7 |
| Sydney FC | Total | | 106 | 23 | 14 | 1 | – | | 11 | 7 | 136 | 31 |
| Career total | | | 441 | 66 | 28 | 4 | 14 | 1 | 11 | 7 | 494 | 78 |

=== International ===
Appearances and goals by national team and year
| National team | Year | Apps | Goals |
|---|---|---|---|
| Australia | 1993 | 4 | 0 |
| Australia | 1994 | 0 | 0 |
| Australia | 1995 | 6 | 1 |
| Australia | 1996 | 2 | 0 |
| Australia | 1997 | 1 | 0 |
| Australia | 1998 | 0 | 0 |
| Australia | 1999 | 0 | 0 |
| Australia | 2000 | 8 | 2 |
| Australia | 2001 | 10 | 2 |
| Australia | 2002 | 0 | 0 |
| Australia | 2003 | 0 | 0 |
| Australia | 2004 | 0 | 0 |
| Australia | 2005 | 0 | 0 |
| Australia | 2006 | 1 | 0 |
| Total | | 32 | 5 |

Scores and results list Australia's goal tally first, score column indicates score after each Corica goal.

List of international goals scored by Steve Corica
| No. | Date | Venue | Opponent | Score | Result | Competition |
|---|---|---|---|---|---|---|
| 1 | 15 February 1995 | Sydney Football Stadium, Sydney, Australia | Japan | 2–1 | 2–1 | Friendly |
| 2 | 9 February 2000 | Estadio Playa Ancha, Valparaíso, Chile | Chile | 1–1 | 1–2 | Friendly |
| 3 | 19 June 2000 | Stade Pater Te Hono Nui, Papeete, Tahiti | Cook Islands | 13–0 | 17–0 | 2000 OFC Nations Cup |
| 4 | 28 February 2001 | Nemesio Camacho Stadium, Bogotá, Colombia | Colombia | 1–3 | 2–3 | Friendly |
| 5 | 14 April 2001 | BCU International Stadium, Coffs Harbour, Australia | Fiji | 1–0 | 2–0 | 2002 FIFA World Cup qualification |

== Managerial statistics ==
As of 1 November 2026

Managerial record by team and tenure
| Team | Nat. | From | To | Record | | | | | Ref. |
| Team | Nat. | From | To | G | W | D | L | Win % | Ref. |
|---|---|---|---|---|---|---|---|---|---|
| Sydney FC (caretaker) | (Australia) | 12 November 2012 | 27 November 2012 | 3 | 0 | 1 | 2 | 0.00 | |
| Sydney FC | (Australia) | 16 May 2018 | 7 November 2023 | 180 | 86 | 37 | 57 | 47.78 | |
| Auckland FC | (New Zealand) | 14 March 2024 | 19 June 2026 | 62 | 33 | 18 | 11 | 53.23 | |
| Yokohama F. Marinos | (Japan) | 1 July 2026 | Present | 18 | 10 | 6 | 2 | 55.56 | |
| Career Total | | | | 263 | 128 | 62 | 73 | 48.67 | |

== Honours ==
=== Player ===
Sydney FC

- A-League Premiership: 2009–10
- A-League Championship: 2006, 2010
- Oceania Club Championship: 2004–05

Marconi Stallions

- NSL Championship: 1992–1993

Australia

- FIFA Confederations Cup: 3rd place, 2001
- OFC Nations Cup: 2000
- AFC–OFC Challenge Cup: runner-up 2001

Individual

- Sydney FC Member's Player of the Year: 2006–07, 2007–08
- NSL Papasavas Medal (U-21): 1992–93
- PFA A-League Team of the Decade: 2005–2015
- Sydney FC Hall of Fame: 2015

Honourable distinctions

- First A-League Finals goalscorer: Sydney FC v Adelaide United – 12 February 2006
- First A-League Grand Final goalscorer: Sydney FC v Central Coast Mariners – 5 March 2006
- First AFC Champions League goalscorer: Sydney FC v Shanghai Shenhua – 7 March 2007

=== Manager ===
Sydney FC

- A-League Premiership: 2019–20
- A-League Championship: 2019, 2020
- Australia Cup: 2023

Auckland FC

- A-League Premiership: 2024–25
- A-League Championship: 2026
