= Clint Yorke =

Tobagonian cricketer (born 1962)

Personal information
- Full name: Clint Gabriel Yorke
- Born: 7 June 1962 (age 64); Tobago
- Batting: Left-handed
- Bowling: Right-arm medium
- Role: Batsman
- Relatives: Dwight Yorke (brother)

Domestic team information
- Years: Team
- 1978/79: Tobago
- 1986/87–1992/93: Trinidad and Tobago
- Source: CricketArchive, 14 May 2016

Clint Gabriel Yorke (born 7 June 1962) is a former cricketer who played for the Trinidad and Tobago national cricket team in West Indian domestic cricket as an opening batsman.
