= James Yorke (writer) =

James Yorke (fl. 1640), was an English heraldic writer.

== Biography ==
Yorke appears to have been a blacksmith in the city of Lincoln, and was, says Fuller, "an excellent workman in his profession, insomuch that if Pegasus himself would wear shoes, this man alone is fit to make them". He is a servant, continues Fuller, "as well of Apollo as of Vulcan, turning his stddy [stithy] into a studdy. And although there be some mistakes [in his Baronage], no hand so steady as always to hit the nail on the head, yet is it of singular use and industriously performed".

His compilation appeared in folio (London, 1640) under the title The Union of Honour. Containing the Armes, Matches, And Issues of the Kings, Dukes, Marquesses, and Earles of England from the Conquest until … 1640, with the Armes of the English Viscounts and Barons now being, and of the Gentry of Lincolnshire, with an engraved title-page inscribed to Charles I "by the lowest of his subjects", and dedicated to Henry Frederick, the son of Thomas Howard, 2nd Earl of Arundel. The heraldry and genealogy is based for the most part upon Milles, Guillim, Brooke, and Vincent, but the work has the great advantage of being arranged in alphabetical order of titles.

From 1622 to 1640 Yorke claims the "creations and continuance of families" as his own work. The historical details and the list of battles appended he derived from Speed and Stow.
