= Dwight Yorke =

Trinbagonian footballer and manager

Dwight Yorke CM
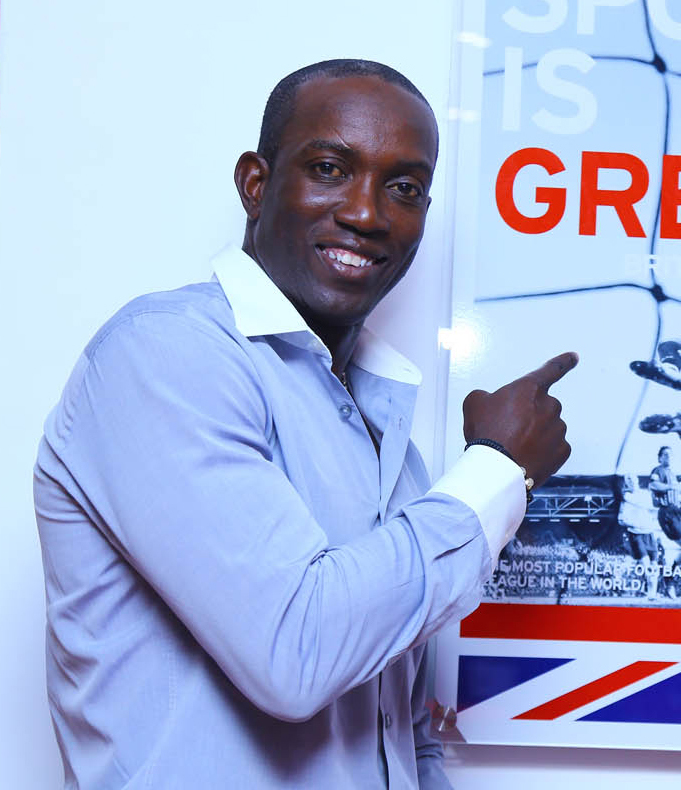
- Yorke in 2012

Personal information
- Full name: Dwight Eversley Yorke
- Date of birth: 3 November 1971 (age 55)
- Place of birth: Canaan, Trinidad and Tobago
- Height: 1.78 m (5 ft 10 in)
- Positions: Forward; winger

Youth career
- 1988–1989: Signal Hill Comprehensive School
- 1989–1990: Aston Villa

Senior career*
Years	Team	Apps	(Gls)
1989–1998	Aston Villa	231	(73)
1998–2002	Manchester United	96	(48)
2002–2004	Blackburn Rovers	60	(12)
2004–2005	Birmingham City	13	(2)
2005–2006	Sydney FC	22	(7)
2006–2009	Sunderland	59	(6)
Total		481	(148)

International career
1989–2009	Trinidad and Tobago	72	(19)

Managerial career
- 2022–2023: Macarthur FC
- 2024–2026: Trinidad and Tobago
- * Club domestic league appearances and goals

Dwight Eversley Yorke CM (born 3 November 1971) is a Tobagonian professional football coach and former player, and the former head coach of Trinidad and Tobago. Throughout his club career, he played for Aston Villa, Manchester United, Blackburn Rovers, Birmingham City, Sydney FC and Sunderland, mainly as a forward, between 1989 and 2009. Yorke formed a prolific strike partnership with Andy Cole at Manchester United, where he won numerous honours including several Premier League titles and the Treble of the Premier League, FA Cup and UEFA Champions League in 1999. Yorke scored 123 goals in the Premier League, a record for a non-European which was not broken until Sergio Agüero in 2017.

At the international level, Yorke represented Trinidad and Tobago on 74 occasions between 1989 and 2009, scoring 19 goals. He helped his nation reach the semi-finals of the 2000 CONCACAF Gold Cup and later qualify for the FIFA World Cup for the first time in its history, in 2006. After retiring from playing in 2009, Yorke became assistant manager of the Trinidad and Tobago national team, a position he held until the completion of the qualifying matches for the 2010 FIFA World Cup. As a manager, he won the Australia Cup with Macarthur FC in 2022, and qualified with Trinidad and Tobago for the 2025 CONCACAF Gold Cup.

== Club career ==
=== Aston Villa ===
Yorke was first discovered by Graham Taylor, at the time the Aston Villa manager, on a tour of the West Indies in 1989. Yorke, aged 17, appeared in a team that played a friendly against Aston Villa. Taylor was impressed and offered Yorke a trial at Villa. Yorke was subsequently given a permanent contract and played for the Villa Reserve and Youth sides for the majority of the 1988–90 season, making his First Division debut for Aston Villa against Crystal Palace on 24 March 1990: Crystal Palace won the game 1–0. During his time with Aston Villa, from 1989 to 1998, Yorke played initially as a right winger until the 1995–96 season, he then switched to centre forward and established himself as one of the Premier League's top strikers.

Yorke was an integral member of the Villa team that reached the League Cup Final in 1996. Villa won 3–0 against Leeds United with Yorke getting on the scoresheet. On 30 September 1996 he scored a hat-trick against Newcastle United in a 4–3 defeat. Yorke appeared for Aston Villa on 284 occasions, scoring 97 times.

The circumstances of his departure from Aston Villa were controversial. John Gregory, Aston Villa's manager at that time, made it known that the club did not want to sell Yorke to Manchester United unless they were prepared to exchange striker Andy Cole. Yorke played for Villa on the opening day of the season at Everton on 15 August 1998; however, it appeared that he made little effort during the match, as he was unhappy at not being allowed to leave the club. Villa were left with no option but to sell the player, and he transferred to Manchester United for £12.6 million on 20 August 1998.

=== Manchester United ===
In his first season, Yorke was a key player in guiding the club to a unique treble of the Premier League, FA Cup and UEFA Champions League, forming a legendary partnership with Andy Cole. Yorke finished the season as the top league goalscorer with 18 goals and contributed goals against Bayern Munich, Barcelona, Inter Milan, and Juventus in the Champions League; he won the Premier League Player of the Season. Yorke was also a regular member of United's 1999–2000 title winning team, contributing 23 goals in all competitions.

Despite a less successful third season, Yorke scored his 100th Premier League goal in a 3-0 victory over Derby County on 24 November 2000 and also netted a hat-trick in the top of the table clash with Arsenal. In January 2002 a move to Middlesbrough fell through. He played his last game for United that month, and was not issued a squad number for the 2002–03 season. Altogether, he scored 65 goals for Manchester United in 152 appearances.

=== Blackburn Rovers ===
In July 2002, Yorke moved to Blackburn Rovers for an initial £2 million, potentially rising to £2.6 million; United had wanted a fee of £6 million. He was signed to cover the long absence of Matt Jansen from a traffic accident, and was reunited with his former United strike partner Andy Cole.

Yorke scored 13 goals in all competitions in his first season at Ewood Park, including the winner on 26 October 2002 as Rovers won 2–1 at reigning champions Arsenal. The following 4 January on his return to Villa Park, he scored twice in a 4–1 win in the FA Cup third round. On 11 May, in the last game of the season, he opened a 4–0 win at Tottenham Hotspur as Blackburn beat Everton to sixth place and UEFA Cup qualification.

=== Birmingham City ===
On 31 August 2004, transfer deadline day, Yorke moved to Birmingham City on a one-year deal with the option of a second. Instead of a loan to Celtic, he chose to join Birmingham for a "substantial but undisclosed fee". It was later reported as £250,000.

Yorke scored on his home debut for Birmingham in a 1–1 draw against Charlton Athletic, with the equaliser seven minutes after replacing Clinton Morrison. He scored again against Graeme Souness's Newcastle on 3 October. However, Yorke fell out of favour at St Andrew's and was released by mutual consent in April 2005.

=== Sydney FC ===
Yorke with Sydney FC in 2006

Yorke immediately signed for Sydney FC, with a salary of $1 million a season. He scored the first goal for Sydney FC in its first A-League regular season match, a diving header against the Melbourne Victory. Yorke came to Sydney FC with the biggest pedigree of all players in the A-League, having won the treble with Manchester United. Yorke scored seven goals in the A-League, with three of them being from penalty kicks. Sydney coach Pierre Littbarski moved Yorke into a midfield role and gave him the team captaincy.

He played a major role in leading Sydney to victory in the inaugural A-League Grand Final on 5 March against regional rivals Central Coast Mariners. He set up the only goal, scored by Steve Corica, in front of a sell out crowd of over 41,000 at the Sydney Football Stadium, and was awarded the Joe Marston Medal as best player in the grand final. Yorke was the marquee player for Sydney – meaning that his salary fell outside the salary cap. He was also a star name for the A-League as a whole. Aside from his footballing talents, the drawing power and credibility he brought both locally and internationally proved to be beneficial for the competition in its inaugural season, leading the Football Federation Australia to use his image and name for the promotion of the A-League's second season.

Due to the schedule of football in Australia, Yorke returned to Manchester United for training from March to June 2006, to retain fitness for the World Cup.

Yorke returned to Sydney to take part in a friendly against Everton in 2010. The game was considered his 'farewell game' as he never had the chance to say a proper farewell to the fans at Sydney. Everton won the match 1–0, and Yorke was substituted midway through the second half.

=== Sunderland ===
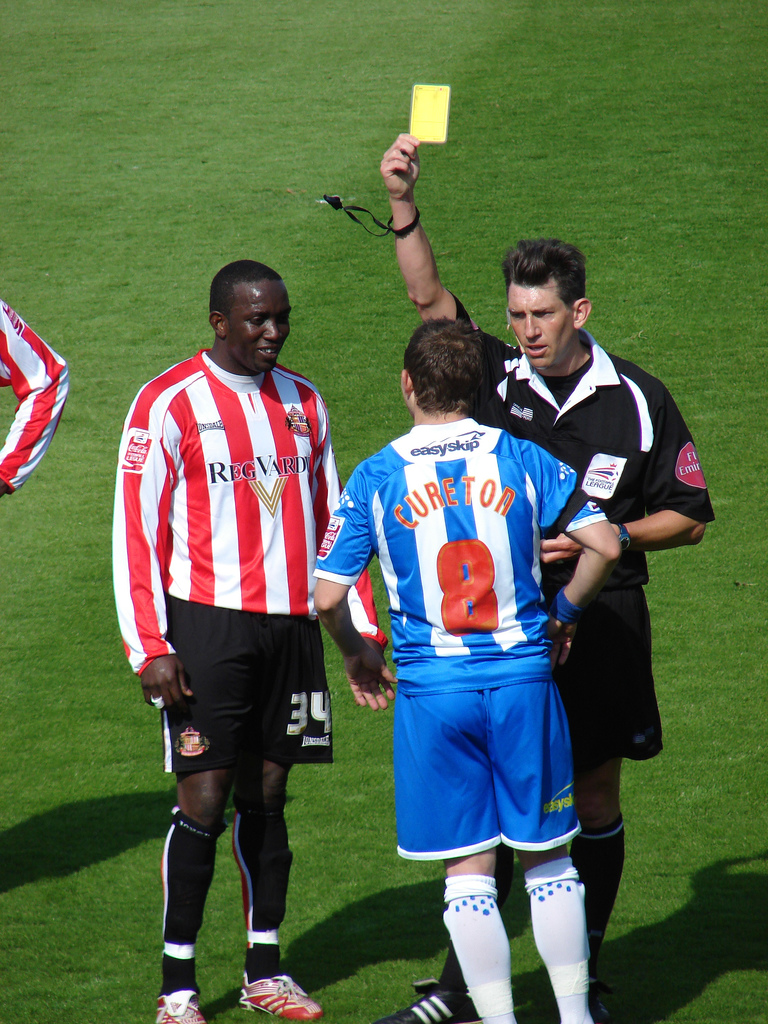
Yorke (left) playing for Sunderland in 2007

On 31 August 2006, Yorke's transfer to Sunderland was announced. The transfer for a fee of £200,000 (A$ $500,000) re-united Yorke with ex-teammate Roy Keane, manager of Sunderland. Yorke made his debut in the home match against Leicester City and received a rapturous standing ovation from home fans when he came on as a substitute in the first half. Yorke was used as a defensive midfielder rather than his usual striker role. He scored his first goal for Sunderland in the 2–1 loss against Stoke.

On 2 January 2008, during Sunderland's 1–0 defeat to Blackburn, Yorke was given a red card by referee Rob Styles. Yorke stated several times he would like to return to the A-League, preferably Sydney. However, following Sydney's signings at the time, it seemed unlikely that Sydney would have been able to fit him under the salary cap. It was reported that Yorke would play for rivals Central Coast Mariners, the team bankrolled by the man who brought him to Sydney, Peter Turnbull.

On 11 March 2008, it was announced that the Mariners were in "advanced negotiations" with Yorke to become the marquee for two years. However, on 1 July he signed a new one-year contract to stay with Sunderland for the 2008–09 season. He was named man of the match for his performance against Arsenal on 4 October 2008, with Sunderland drawing 1–1 at home. Following Keane's departure in December 2008, Yorke and Neil Bailey were named as assistants to Ricky Sbragia. Yorke was released at the end of the 2008–09 season.

=== Post-retirement ===
Yorke has completed his Level B coaching badge, and in 2010 was quoted as being interested in pursuing a career in coaching, ideally with Aston Villa. On 17 April 2011, he completed the London Marathon in a time of 3 hours and 32 minutes. On 14 August 2011, Yorke signed a two-year deal to work for Sky Sports as a pundit.

== International career ==
Yorke was capped 72 times for the Trinidad and Tobago national team, scoring 19 goals. Along with his friend Russell Latapy, Yorke was a member of the 1989 'Strike Squad', the national team which narrowly failed to qualify for the 1990 FIFA World Cup. He retired from international football in 2001 after a disagreement with coach René Simões, who cut Yorke and Russell Latapy from the squad prior to a decisive game of the 2002 World Cup qualification, as both missed practice following a night partying. However, he returned to the team for the 2006 World Cup qualification campaign, in which the team qualified for the World Cup finals for the first time in their history after a 2–1 aggregate qualifying victory over Bahrain.

Yorke was captain for all of Trinidad and Tobago's games at the 2006 World Cup and was man of the match in the 0–0 draw against Sweden, pipping his close friend Shaka Hislop to the honour despite the then West Ham goalkeeper making several world-class saves. He was one of six players in the Trinidad squad (the others being Brent Sancho, Dennis Lawrence, Chris Birchall, Carlos Edwards and Stern John) to have played every minute of the campaign. Yorke was rated the best defensive midfielder in the opening stages of the World Cup.

Yorke announced his retirement from international football in March 2007, choosing to focus on his club career at Sunderland. He captained the side in Germany, and up until his retirement. However, he made a guest return appearance for a friendly against England in June 2008 after being invited by FIFA vice-president Jack Warner. On 10 July 2008, the TTFF announced Yorke's return to the national team for the 2010 World Cup qualification campaign.

On 15 October 2008, he scored his first international goal after returning from retirement against the United States in a 2010 World Cup qualification match. The game ended 2–1 for Trinidad and Tobago. His goal was a crucial tie-breaker scored in the 79th minute, which put Trinidad and Tobago in a great situation to advance to the next qualifying stage, needing only a tie against Cuba in their final game. On 11 February 2009, Yorke scored a 26th-minute penalty for his country, but was sent off in the dying seconds of Trinidad and Tobago's opening match of 2010 World Cup qualification against El Salvador (2–2) after exchanging heated remarks with Mexican referee Marco Antonio Rodríguez (the Trini star had voiced his disapproval of the disruptions caused by the home crowd) and was consequently banned for four games due to his use of abusive language. The suspension was later reduced to two matches.

After being released from Sunderland, and being unable to find a club before the end of the current transfer window, Yorke retired from football altogether in September 2009, and took up the post of assistant manager with the Trinidad and Tobago national team.

== Management career ==
=== Early career ===
On 21 April 2019, Yorke was interviewed for the vacant role at National League side Sutton United. However, the club appointed Matt Gray instead.

Aston Villa appointed Steven Gerrard as their new manager on 12 November 2021. Yorke said he was disappointed not to be hired, and that he had applied three times.

On 21 April 2022, it was reported that Yorke was being considered for the vacant manager's position at Perth Glory in the Australian A-League Men. He managed the A-Leagues All Stars in their 3–2 loss against Barcelona on 25 May.

=== Macarthur FC ===
On 1 July 2022, Yorke became the new manager of A-League Men side Macarthur FC, replacing Ante Milicic to become the club’s second manager. He signed a two-year deal Three months later, he led the club towards its first trophy after winning the 2022 Australia Cup Final against Sydney United 58.

Yorke left the Bulls on 21 January 2023, the day after a 1–0 loss to Adelaide United. The team were in sixth at the halfway point of the season, within the placing for the finals series.

=== Trinidad and Tobago ===
On 1 November 2024, Yorke became the new manager of the Trinidad and Tobago national team, succeeding Angus Eve. His debut on 17 December was a 3–1 friendly loss away to Saudi Arabia. In March, the team overcame Cuba 6–1 on aggregate to make the 2025 CONCACAF Gold Cup. At the finals in the United States in June, the team exited in the group stage with a 5–0 loss to the hosts and draws with Haiti and Saudi Arabia. In November 2025, Yorke's side were eliminated from 2026 FIFA World Cup qualification, having drawn at home to Jamaica in the last fixture.

== Personal life ==
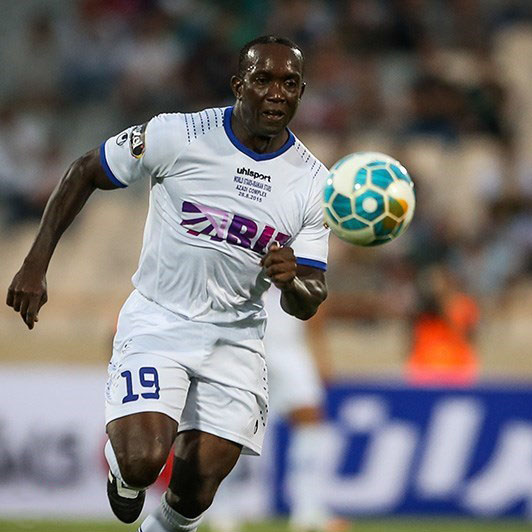
Yorke in 2015

Yorke grew up as a Tottenham Hotspur fan and his first jersey was a white Tottenham Hotspur shirt.

Yorke had a brief relationship with former model turned writer Katie Price which produced son Harvey, who was born in May 2002. He is autistic and partially blind, and has the genetic disorder Prader–Willi syndrome. In a 2009 interview, Yorke conceded being unfaithful to Price during their relationship, and subsequently playing no role in the upbringing of their son. He has not claimed paternity, despite a paternity test proving he is Harvey's father. He has made no contribution towards Harvey's care and treatment and has not visited or contacted his son.

The Dwight Yorke Stadium in Bacolet, Tobago, constructed for the 2001 FIFA U-17 World Championship, was named in Yorke's honour. Yorke is a cricket fan. One of Yorke's closest friends is Brian Lara. During the 1999 Cricket World Cup, Yorke made regular appearances bringing on drinks for the West Indies cricket team. Yorke's older brother, Clint Yorke, is a former first-class cricketer who has represented the Trinidad and Tobago national cricket team as an opening batsman.

Yorke featured extensively in an episode of Australia's The Biggest Loser, which aired on 28 February 2006. The episode involved Yorke coaching the "red team" of contestants while they competed against the "blue team" in a game of football. Mark Rudan, Yorke's Sydney teammate, was the manager of the "blue team".

As a member of the squad that competed at the 2006 World Cup, Yorke was awarded the Chaconia Medal (Gold Class), the second highest state decoration of Trinidad and Tobago. He was also made a Sports Ambassador for the country.

Yorke released his autobiography, Born to Score, in 2009.

In December 2018, Yorke avoided bankruptcy by paying a £1.5 million debt to HM Revenue and Customs.

== Career statistics ==
=== Club ===
Appearances and goals by club, season and competition
Club	Season	League			FA Cup (Note: Includes FA Cup)		League Cup (Note: Includes League Cup)		Continental		Other		Total	
Club	Season	Division	Apps	Goals	Apps	Goals	Apps	Goals	Apps	Goals	Apps	Goals	Apps	Goals
Aston Villa	1989–90	First Division	2	0	0	0	—		—		0	0	2	0
Aston Villa	1990–91	First Division	18	2	2	0	1	0	0	0	—		21	2
Aston Villa	1991–92	First Division	32	11	5	5	2	0	—		1 (Note: Appearance in Full Members' Cup)	1	40	17
Aston Villa	1992–93	Premier League	27	6	4	1	4	0	—		—		35	7
Aston Villa	1993–94	Premier League	12	2	2	1	0	0	0	0	—		14	3
Aston Villa	1994–95	Premier League	37	6	2	1	4	1	0	0	—		43	8
Aston Villa	1995–96	Premier League	35	17	5	2	8	6	—		—		48	25
Aston Villa	1996–97	Premier League	37	17	2	2	2	1	2 (Note: Appearances in UEFA Cup)	0	—		43	20
Aston Villa	1997–98	Premier League	30	12	2	2	1	0	7	2	—		40	16
Aston Villa	1998–99	Premier League	1	0	—		—		—		—		1	0
Aston Villa	Total		231	73	24	14	22	8	9	2	1	1	287	98
Manchester United	1998–99	Premier League	32	18	8	3	0	0	11 (Note: Appearances in UEFA Champions League)	8	—		51	29
Manchester United	1999–2000	Premier League	32	20	—		0	0	11	2	4 (Note: One appearance in FA Charity Shield, one in UEFA Super Cup, two appearances and one goal in FIFA Club World Cup)	1	47	23
Manchester United	2000–01	Premier League	22	9	2	0	2	2	11	1	1 (Note: Appearance in FA Charity Shield)	0	38	12
Manchester United	2001–02	Premier League	10	1	1	0	1	0	3	0	1	0	16	1
Manchester United	Total		96	48	11	3	3	2	36	11	6	1	152	65
Blackburn Rovers	2002–03	Premier League	33	8	3	3	4	2	3	0	—		43	13
Blackburn Rovers	2003–04	Premier League	23	4	1	0	1	2	2	0	—		27	6
Blackburn Rovers	2004–05	Premier League	4	0	—		—		—		—		4	0
Blackburn Rovers	Total		60	12	4	3	5	4	5	0	—		74	19
Birmingham City	2004–05	Premier League	13	2	1	0	2	0	—		—		16	2
Sydney FC	2005–06	A-League	21	7	—		—		—		2 (Note: Appearances in FIFA Club World Cup)	1	23	8
Sydney FC	2006–07	A-League	1	0	—		—		—		—		1	0
Sydney FC	Total		22	7	—		—		—		2	1	24	8
Sunderland	2006–07	Championship	32	5	1	0	—		—		—		33	5
Sunderland	2007–08	Premier League	20	1	0	0	1	0	—		—		21	1
Sunderland	2008–09	Premier League	7	0	1	0	0	0	—		—		8	0
Sunderland	Total		59	6	2	0	1	0	—		—		62	6
Career total			481	148	42	20	33	14	50	13	9	3	615	198

=== International ===
Appearances and goals by national team and year
National team	Year	Apps	Goals
Trinidad and Tobago	1989	10	2
Trinidad and Tobago	1990	0	0
Trinidad and Tobago	1991	0	0
Trinidad and Tobago	1992	5	0
Trinidad and Tobago	1993	1	1
Trinidad and Tobago	1994	1	0
Trinidad and Tobago	1995	0	0
Trinidad and Tobago	1996	5	1
Trinidad and Tobago	1997	0	0
Trinidad and Tobago	1998	0	0
Trinidad and Tobago	1999	1	0
Trinidad and Tobago	2000	9	8
Trinidad and Tobago	2001	7	1
Trinidad and Tobago	2002	0	0
Trinidad and Tobago	2003	0	0
Trinidad and Tobago	2004	1	0
Trinidad and Tobago	2005	13	0
Trinidad and Tobago	2006	9	3
Trinidad and Tobago	2007	0	0
Trinidad and Tobago	2008	6	2
Trinidad and Tobago	2009	4	1
Total		72	19

Scores and results list Trinidad and Tobago's goal tally first, score column indicates score after each Yorke goal.

List of international goals scored by Dwight Yorke
No.	Date	Venue	Opponent	Score	Result	Competition
1	9 July 1989	Bridgetown, Barbados	Grenada	1–0	2–1	1989 Caribbean Cup
2	9 July 1989	Bridgetown, Barbados	Grenada	2–1	2–1	1989 Caribbean Cup
3	21 May 1993	Montego Bay, Jamaica	Saint Vincent and the Grenadines		4–1	1993 Caribbean Cup
4	23 June 1996	Port of Spain, Trinidad and Tobago	Dominican Republic	2–0	8–0	1998 FIFA World Cup qualification
5	15 February 2000	Los Angeles, United States	Guatemala	4–2	4–2	2000 CONCACAF Gold Cup
6	7 May 2000	Port of Spain, Trinidad and Tobago	Haiti	3–0	3–1	2002 FIFA World Cup qualification
7	19 May 2000	Port-au-Prince, Haiti	Haiti	1–0	1–1	2002 FIFA World Cup qualification
8	8 July 2000	Port of Spain, Trinidad and Tobago	Jamaica	1–0	2–4	Friendly
9	8 July 2000	Port of Spain, Trinidad and Tobago	Jamaica	2–3	2–4	Friendly
10	16 July 2000	Edmonton, Canada	Canada	2–0	2–0	2002 FIFA World Cup qualification
11	16 August 2000	Port of Spain, Trinidad and Tobago	Panama	3–0	6–0	2002 FIFA World Cup qualification
12	16 August 2000	Port of Spain, Trinidad and Tobago	Panama	5–0	6–0	2002 FIFA World Cup qualification
13	23 June 2001	Hamilton, Bermuda	Bermuda	1–0	5–0	Friendly
14	28 February 2006	London, England	Iceland	1–0	2–0	Friendly
15	28 February 2006	London, England	Iceland	2–0	2–0	Friendly
16	7 October 2006	Port of Spain, Trinidad and Tobago	Saint Vincent and the Grenadines	4–0	5–0	Friendly
17	15 October 2008	Port of Spain, Trinidad and Tobago	United States	2–1	2–1	2010 FIFA World Cup qualification
18	19 November 2008	Port of Spain, Trinidad and Tobago	Cuba	2–0	3–0	2010 FIFA World Cup qualification
19	11 February 2009	San Salvador, El Salvador	El Salvador	2–0	2–2	2010 FIFA World Cup qualification

== Managerial statistics ==
As of 18 November 2025

Team	Nat	From	To	Record							
Team	Nat	From	To	G	W	D	L	GF	GA	GD	Win %
Macarthur FC	(Australia)	1 July 2022	21 January 2023	19	10	3	6	37	19	+18	52.63
Trinidad and Tobago	(Trinidad and Tobago)	11 November 2024	Present	18	4	7	7	26	29	−3	22.22
Total				37	14	10	13	63	48	+15	37.84

== Honours ==
=== Player ===
Aston Villa

- Football League Cup: 1995–96

Manchester United

- Premier League: 1998–99, 1999–2000, 2000–01
- FA Cup: 1998–99
- UEFA Champions League: 1998–99
- Intercontinental Cup: 1999

Sydney FC

- A-League: 2005–06

Sunderland

- Football League Championship: 2006–07

Trinidad and Tobago

- Caribbean Cup: 1989

Individual

- Premier League Player of the Month: February 1996, January 1999, March 2000
- PFA Team of the Year: 1998–99 Premier League
- Premier League Player of the Season: 1998–99
- Premier League Golden Boot: 1998–99
- UEFA Champions League top scorer: 1998–99
- Joe Marston Medal: 2005–06
- Sydney FC Hall of Fame: 2015
- Hummingbird Medal Silver: 1992
- Chaconia Medal Gold: 1999

=== Manager ===
Macarthur FC

- Australia Cup: 2022
