= Jim York (catcher) =

American baseball player (1895-1934)

- Catcher
- Born: July 11, 1895; St. Peters, Pennsylvania, U.S.
- Died: September 11, 1934 (aged 39); Chester, Pennsylvania, U.S.
- Threw: Right

Negro league baseball debut
- 1918, for the Atlantic City Bacharach Giants

Last appearance
- 1923, for the Atlantic City Bacharach Giants

Teams
- Atlantic City Bacharach Giants (1918); Hilldale Club (1920–1921); New York Bacharach Giants (1922); Atlantic City Bacharach Giants (1923)

James Henry York (July 11, 1895 – September 11, 1934) was an American Negro league catcher for the Bacharach Giants and Hilldale Club between 1918 and 1923.

A native of St. Peters, Pennsylvania, York died in Chester, Pennsylvania in 1934 at age 39.
