= Tom Yorke =

English rugby league footballer

Personal information
- Full name: Tom Yorke
- Born: 12 July 1920; St Helens
- Died: December 2004 (aged 84); St. Helens, Lancashire, England

Playing information
- Position: Prop, Hooker, Loose forward
Club
Years	Team	Pld	T	G	FG	P
1948–50	St. Helens	7	1	1	0	5
1951–53	Warrington	9	0	0	0	0
	Total	16	1	1	0	5
- As of 12 December 2016

Tom Yorke (12 July 1920 – December 2004) was a former professional rugby league footballer who played in the 1940s and 1950s. He played at club level for St. Helens Schoolboys, St. Helens YMCA, Parr Legionnaires, St. Helens, and Warrington, as a prop, hooker, or loose forward, and coached at club level for United Glass Bottle Manufacturers Limited ARLFC.

== Playing career ==
=== Notable tour matches ===
Tom Yorke played hooker, and scored a try and a goal in St. Helens' 74-38 victory over Italy at Knowsley Road, St. Helens on Wednesday 30 August 1950, in front of a crowd of 14,000.

=== Club career ===
Tom Yorke made his début for St. Helens playing loose forward in the 13-2 victory over Buslingthorpe Vale ARLFC in the 1947–48 Challenge Cup first-round second-leg match at Meanwood Road, Leeds on Saturday 14 February 1948, and he played his last match for St. Helens playing hooker in the 6-6 draw with York F.C. at Clarence Street, York on Saturday 18 November 1950, he made his début for Warrington on Wednesday 18 April 1951, and he played his last match for Warrington on Saturday 21 February 1953.
