= David Traktovenko =

Russian businessman (born 1956)

- Born: David Isaakovich Traktovenko; 28 January 1956 (age 70); Leningrad, Russian SFSR, Soviet Union (now Saint Petersburg, Russia)
- Children: 1
- Relatives: Alina Barlow (stepdaughter)

David Isaakovich Traktovenko (Russian: Давид Исаакович Трактовенко; born 28 January 1956) is a Russian billionaire businessman who owned Sydney FC from 2009 to 2015.

== Education ==
In 1978, Traktovenko graduated from the Leningrad Financial and Economic Institute.

== Career ==
Traktovenko's career in the banking sector began in 1978. He worked at the State Bank of the USSR, in the Leningrad Regional Department of Promstroybank of the USSR.

In 1990, he became a member of the Board of the Leningrad Industrial and Construction Bank. Since 1994, he has been the First Deputy Chairman of the Management Board of JSC Industrial and Construction Bank. Since 1996, he has been Chairman of the Management Board of JSC Industrial and Construction Bank.

In 1998, Traktovenko became the first vice president of St. Petersburg Banking House CJSC and the first vice president of the Association of Russian Banks. From 2001 to 2005, he was a member of the supervisory board, and then chairman of the supervisory board, of JSC Bank Saint Petersburg; from 2005 to 2007, he was the president of St. Petersburg Banking House CJSC.

Since 2005, he has chaired the Supervisory Board of NP "Banking House "Saint Petersburg", and since 2007, he has chaired the St. Petersburg Banking House CJSC's board of directors.

== Football ==
From 2003 to 2005, Traktovenko was chairman of the board of directors of FC Zenit of Saint Petersburg. In 2006 he sold the club to Gazprom structures.

Traktovenko took over the ownership of A-League club Sydney FC in March 2009. Traktovenko left Sydney FC in 2015, with his then-son-in-law Scott Barlow taking over for him.

== Personal life ==
Traktovenko is married. He has one son, Vyacheslav Traktovenko. He is the stepfather of Australian socialite Alina Barlow.

Traktovenko is a billionaire.
