= List of Sydney FC seasons =

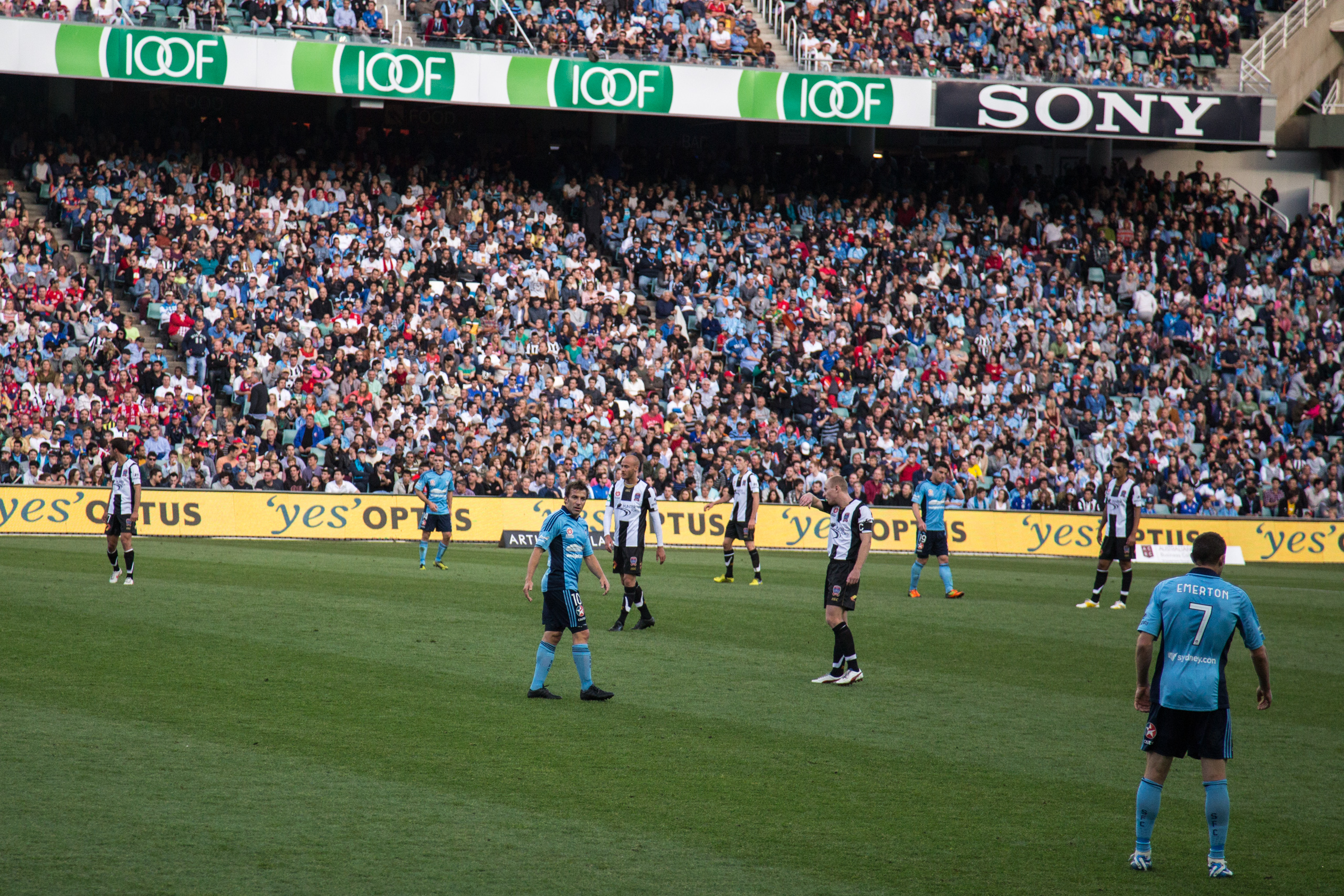
Sydney FC playing against the Newcastle Jets in October 2012.

Sydney Football Club is an Australian professional association football club based in Moore Park, Sydney. The club was formed in 2004. They became the first member from the NSW admitted into the A-League along with the Central Coast Mariners and the Newcastle Jets. The club has won the A-League Premierships four times, A-League Championship five times, Australia Cup (formerly known as the FFA Cup) two times, and the Oceania Club Championship one time.

In the 2010s, Sydney FC were the dominant side of Australia, winning three league premierships, three league championships and one FFA Cup, however the squad also finished lower than fifth five times in the course of the decade.

== Key ==
Key to league competitions:

- A-League Men – Australia's top soccer league, established in 2005

Key to colours and symbols:

1st or W	Winners
2nd or RU	Runners-up
3rd	Third
♦	Top scorer in division

Key to league record:

- Season = The year and article of the season
- Pos = Final position
- Pld = Games played
- W = Games won
- D = Games drawn
- L = Games lost
- GF = Goals scored
- GA = Goals against
- Pts = Points

Key to cup record:

- En-dash (—) = Sydney FC did not participate or cup not held
- DNQ = Did not qualify
- DNE = The club did not enter cup play
- GS = Group stage
- R32 = Round of 32
- R16 = Round of 16
- QF = Quarter-finals
- SF = Semi-finals
- RU = Runners-up
- W = Winners

== Seasons ==
Results of league and cup competitions by season
Season	Division	P	W	D	L	F	A	Pts	Pos	Finals	Australia Cup (Note: Includes A-League Pre-Season Challenge Cup (2005–2009) and FFA Cup/Australia Cup (from 2014))	Competition	Result	Name	Goals
Season	League									Finals	Australia Cup	Other / Asia (Note: Includes OFC Champions League (2005–06), AFC Champions League (from 2006) and AFC Champions League Two (from 2024))		Top goalscorer (Note: Includes goals scored in the A-League, A-League Finals, FFA Cup, AFC Champions League, OFC Champions League, Pre-Season Challenge Cup and the Pan-Pacific Championship)	
2005–06	A-League	21	10	6	5	35	28	36	2nd	W	SF	Oceania Club Championship FIFA Club World Championship	W 5th	(Australia) Sasho Petrovski	18
2006–07	A-League	21	8	8	5	29	19	29 (Note: Sydney were penalised three competition points following round 18 due to salary cap breaches which occurred during the 2005–06 season.)	4th	SF	3rd	AFC Champions League	GS	(Australia) Sasho Petrovski (2) (Australia) Alex Brosque	8
2007–08	A-League	21	8	8	5	28	24	32	3rd	SF	GS	Pan-Pacific Championship	SF	(Australia) Alex Brosque (2)	9
2008–09	A-League	21	7	5	9	33	32	26	5th	—	GS	—		(Australia) Alex Brosque (3)	6
2009–10	A-League	27	15	3	9	35	23	48	1st	W	—	—		(Australia) John Aloisi	10
2010–11	A-League	30	8	10	12	35	40	34	8th	—	—	AFC Champions League	GS	(Brazil) Bruno Cazarine	12
2011–12	A-League	27	10	8	9	37	42	38	5th	EF	—	—		(Brazil) Bruno Cazarine (2)	8
2012–13	A-League	27	9	5	13	41	51	32	7th	—	—	—		(Italy) Alessandro Del Piero	14
2013–14	A-League	27	12	3	12	40	38	39	5th	EF	—	—		(Italy) Alessandro Del Piero (2)	10
2014–15	A-League	27	14	8	5	52	35	50	2nd	RU	QF	—		(Austria) Marc Janko	16 ♦
2015–16	A-League	27	8	10	9	36	36	34	7th	—	R16	AFC Champions League	R16	(Slovakia) Filip Hološko	10
2016–17	A-League	27	20	6	1	55	12	66	1st	W	RU	—		(Brazil) Bobô	16
2017–18	A-League	27	20	4	3	64	22	64	1st	SF	W	AFC Champions League	GS	(Brazil) Bobô (2)	36 ♦
2018–19	A-League	27	16	4	7	43	29	52	2nd	W	RU	AFC Champions League	GS	(England) Adam Le Fondre	23
2019–20	A-League	26	16	5	5	49	25	53	1st	W	R32	AFC Champions League	GS	(England) Adam Le Fondre (2)	22
2020–21	A-League	26	13	8	5	39	23	47	2nd	RU	Cancelled (Note: Sydney did not enter the 2020 FFA Cup due to the event being cancelled following the COVID-19 pandemic in Australia, with only a limited number of preliminatory rounds being played.)	AFC Champions League	Withdrew (Note: All Australian representatives in the 2021 AFC Champions League, including Sydney, withdrew prior to their first matches in the competition.)	(Brazil) Bobô (3)	12
2021–22	A-League Men	26	8	7	11	37	44	31	8th	—	SF	AFC Champions League	GS	(England) Adam Le Fondre (3)	11
2022–23	A-League Men	26	11	5	10	40	39	38	5th	SF	QF	—		(England) Adam Le Fondre (4)	13
2023–24	A-League Men	27	12	5	10	52	41	41	4th	SF	W	—		(Brazil) Fábio Gomes (England) Joe Lolley	13
2024–25	A-League Men	26	10	7	9	53	46	37	7th	—	R32	AFC Champions League Two	SF	(Australia) Adrian Segecic	18 ♦
2025–26	A-League Men	26	11	6	9	33	25	39	5th	RU	QF	—		(Australia) Al Hassan Touré	6
