= 2006–07 Sydney FC season =

Sydney FC
2006–2007 season
- Chairman: Walter Bugno, George Perry
- Manager: Terry Butcher, Branko Čulina
- A-League: 4th (League); Semi-finals (Finals)
- A-League Pre-Season Challenge Cup: 3rd
- AFC Champions League: Group stage (2nd)
- Top goalscorer: League: Sasho Petrovski (5 goals); All: Sasho Petrovski (8 goals)
- Highest home attendance: 21,122 (v Newcastle United Jets, 26 January 2007)
- Lowest home attendance: 9,871 (v New Zealand Knights, 10 November 2006)
Home colours	Away colours

The 2006–07 season is Sydney FC's second season of soccer in Australia. Sydney FC contested in the 2006–07 A-League, and after winning the inaugural A-League Championship in 2005–06, competed in the 2007 AFC Champions League as one of Australia's two representatives.

== Review ==
=== Preseason ===
After winning the A-League Championship in his first season with the club, head coach Pierre Littbarski signalled his intentions to remain with Sydney FC for the following season in April, whilst the club indicated that an "in-principle agreement" with Littbarski had been finalised. In May 2006 however, it was revealed that Littbarski would not accept an estimated A$250,000 pay cut to his original contract and thus decided to leave Sydney FC. Two months later, Sydney announced that they had agreed to terms with Motherwell F.C. manager and former England international Terry Butcher, who would sign a two-year deal.

During the off-season, Sydney released Andrew Packer from the final year of his contract for him to return to his home state to play for Queensland Roar, whilst signing Alex Brosque (Queensland – 3 years) and Jeremy Brockie (New Zealand – 2 years). 19-year-old Ruben Zadkovich, who was signed as short-term cover for Ufuk Talay late in the 2005–06 season, also upgraded to a two-year full-time contract with Sydney. Matthew Bingley was released from the squad due to salary cap restrictions.

=== Preseason Challenge Cup ===
==== Group stage ====
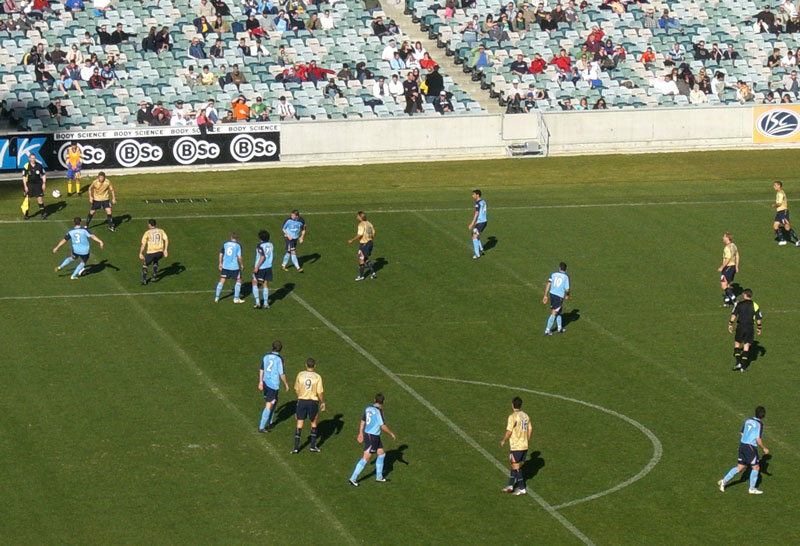
Sydney FC playing Newcastle United at Canberra Stadium

The group stage of the A-League pre-season cup saw Sydney drawn with Queensland Roar FC, Newcastle United Jets and the New Zealand Knights, whilst in the "bonus round" they would face Perth Glory. Sydney decided to host their two "home" matches during the group stage in Canberra (vs Newcastle) and Wollongong (vs Perth), as well as a match in Campbelltown in the final rounds of the competition. Sydney's first match for 2006–07 was against Queensland, and featured the debut of former Queensland player Alex Brosque, as well as Nikolai Topor-Stanley, a short-term signing to cover injury to defender Jacob Timpano. Brosque scored the winning goal for Sydney against his old club with three minutes remaining. Sydney went to the top of the group with a 2–1 win over Newcastle, Topor-Stanley scoring just three minutes into his debut starting appearance, and the Jets' only goal coming from Sydney player Terry McFlynn. A scoreless draw away to New Zealand sealed Sydney's place in the semi-finals, with the "bonus round" against Perth Glory still to play. Sydney won the match 3–0, picking up two bonus points and easily finishing on top of Group B with 12 points to each other teams' three.

==== Knockout stages ====
Sydney were drawn against Adelaide United, 2nd-placed finishers in group A, in their semi-final, which was held in Wollongong. Adelaide scored first through Travis Dodd, but a goal from David Carney two minutes before half-time levelled the scores. A red card to Alvin Ceccoli for "foul and abusive language" towards referee Mark Shield after the end of the first half left the hosts with ten men for the remainder, and although Sydney managed to create several chances, Adelaide ultimately came out on top with a goal to Kristian Rees in the final minute of the match. The result left Sydney to play-off with Newcastle for third place in the competition.

The 3rd-place playoff was contested in Campbelltown in south-western Sydney. Injuries and representative duties for several of Sydney's regular players handed Terry Butcher the opportunity to give game time to backup goalkeeper Justin Pasfield, as well as trial uncontracted players such as Nikolas Tsattalios, Jason Naidovski and Steven Bozinovski. Goals to Sasho Petrovski and Mark Rudan saw Sydney win the match 2–0 and take third place in the Pre-Season Cup.

=== Regular season ===
Sydney FC's 2006–07 A-League season campaign began with a rematch against their 2005–06 Grand Final opponents, the Central Coast Mariners. Over 19,000 people turned out to see an Iain Fyfe goal seal the contest for Sydney, while goalkeeper kept a clean sheet with two especially excellent saves keeping Sydney in the match. Sydney's following match was the first played at Melbourne's Telstra Dome – a decision made because Melbourne's regular home ground of Olympic Park was unavailable, but allowed an A-League record attendance of almost 40,000 to see the match. After just 13 minutes, Sydney were behind 2–0 to Melbourne, with captain Mark Rudan having been sent off for retaliation. Coach Terry Butcher praised the "spirit" of the Sydney team as they outscored Melbourne for the remainder of the match, but Sydney could not level the scores as Melbourne took the match 3–2. Two days before the Melbourne match it was confirmed that Sydney FC's marquee player Dwight Yorke would be leaving the club for English Championship team Sunderland for a reported £200,000 transfer fee. Whilst Yorke still had one season remaining on his original contract with Sydney, the club were not committed to extending his contract and could not compete with the salary rise offered by Sunderland.

With two draws and a win in their following three matches leaving them sitting in third position after five rounds, Sydney welcomed the arrival of Italian Benito Carbone for a four-match "guest stint". The 35-year-old had an instant impact, setting up goals for Ruben Zadkovich and Sasho Petrovski before scoring one of his own as Sydney ran away 4–1 winners over rivals Adelaide at Hindmarsh Stadium. The performance had Carbone touted as a possible marquee replacement for Dwight Yorke, but a management re-shuffle, which saw chairman Walter Bugno replaced by Edmund Capon and CEO Tim Parker by George Perry, forced Sydney to focus on financial stability in their second season and eventually led to the loss of Carbone. Carbone's final appearance for Sydney, in an away match against the Central Coast, was the first in a string of four consecutive matches in which Sydney scored an early goal but failed to win the match. The run coincided with a large injury list for Sydney, travelling to Newcastle with a squad of just 13 players despite the return of Matthew Bingley on a short-term contract. The return of David Carney, however, saw a 4–0 win over the New Zealand Knights, which sparked a streak of six matches in which Sydney conceded just one goal. This gave Sydney a run of eight matches undefeated heading into the Christmas break, where they sat second on the ladder.

Sydney began the 2007 year well, with a 2–0 away win over the Newcastle Jets on New Year's Day. The result ensured that Sydney retained second position and their one-point margin over Adelaide United on the table despite the deduction of three points due to salary cap breaches. In the following match, against New Zealand, Sydney's run of 542 minutes without conceding a goal came to an end, as did their nine-match unbeaten streak. A 1–0 loss to Adelaide in the penultimate round dropped Sydney to third position, and following Newcastle's 4–0 win over Melbourne in the first match of the final round, left Sydney needing to secure at least a point against Queensland Roar in order to finish in the top four. They did so, earning a 1–1 draw and thus scraping into the finals on goal difference ahead of Queensland.

==== Salary cap breaches ====
It was revealed in late 2004, shortly after the launch of the A-League, that the competition's salary cap rules included unrestricted concessions for "service agreements" – off-field earnings from sponsors to players in return for additional services. Then-chairman Walter Bugno confirmed that Sydney would be including service agreements in players' contracts, but denied that Sydney had contravened any rules regarding salaries whilst speculation mounted that Sydney had already exceeded the salary cap and the FFA announced a zero tolerance policy for breaches in the area. During the 2006–07 season, the FFA announced that Sydney had been found guilty of salary cap breaches regarding the 2005–06 season. Although the FFA would not divulge the nature of the breach, Sydney CEO Tim Parker attributed it to Sydney's unexpectedly heavy schedule which saw them play in the 2005 Oceania Club Championship, 2005 FIFA Club World Championship and the A-League finals series – preventing players from completing the additional services for which they were paid. Sydney were fined $89,000 and penalised one competition point, but the fine was reduced to $44,000 and the point penalty suspended due to the Sydney FC administration's co-operation with FFA investigations.

One month after the initial penalty, in September 2006, it was announced that the FFA would again be investigating alleged discrepancies regarding the contract of a Sydney FC player. The investigation concluded that Sydney had committed multiple breaches of the player contracting regulations: "an undisclosed payment made to a player, pre-payments from the club to players and payments made by the club to agents of the players", all of which should have been, but were not included in Sydney's declaration of player payments for 2005–06. FFA Management assessed that the severity of the breaches warranted a $259,000 fine for Sydney as well as a penalty of three competition points, but this was again reduced in consideration of Sydney's co-operation with the investigation. Sydney's final penalty was a $129,000 fine along with the deduction of three competition points (including the activation of the one point suspended penalty from the earlier breach), with a suspended automatic one point penalty should Sydney be found to be in breach of contracting regulations in 2006–07 or 2007–08. Sydney "reluctantly accepted" the decision and elected not to appeal the penalty, which left them still in second position with three premiership rounds remaining, but their gap back to Adelaide United was reduced to a single point.

=== Postseason ===
Following the completion of the A-League season, Terry Butcher resigned as Sydney FC coach. He was replaced by Branko Culina, who was appointed as interim coach for the club's AFC Champions League campaign on 13 February 2007.

==== Friendly matches ====
As part of Sydney's ACL campaign, a number of friendly matches were arranged against local clubs, and a match against the Malaysian national team. These matches were generally a part of preparations for upcoming ACL matches (as Australian clubs are not playing as regularly as other Asian domestic leagues) and also to build connections with the NSW football community.

==== Asian Champions League ====
As 2005–06 Champions, Sydney qualified for the 2007 AFC Champions League as one of the two teams representing Australia along with 2005–06 League Premiers, Adelaide United. The draw took place in Kuala Lumpur on 22 December 2006. Sydney were placed into Group E along with J.League 2006 Champions Urawa Reds, Chinese Super League 2006 Runners-up Shanghai Shenhua and Liga Indonesia 2005–06 Champions Persik Kediri.

Group matches were played from March to May 2007, each team playing each other at home and away. Sydney made an impressive start, defeating Shanghai away and holding Urawa to a draw at Sydney Football Stadium. A shock loss to Persik in Indonesia was followed up by a 3–0 win in Sydney two weeks later, but disappointing scoreless draws in the final two matches against Shanghai and Urawa meant Sydney finished second in their group and Urawa progressed to the next stage.

== Players ==
=== Squad ===
Note: Flags indicate national team as defined under FIFA eligibility rules; some limited exceptions apply. Players may hold more than one non-FIFA nationality.

No.	Pos.	Nation	Player
1	GK	AUS	Clint Bolton
2	DF	AUS	Iain Fyfe
3	DF	AUS	Alvin Ceccoli
3	DF	AUS	Nikolas Tsattalios
4	DF	AUS	Mark Rudan (captain)
5	MF	AUS	Noel Spencer
6	MF	AUS	Ufuk Talay
7	MF	AUS	Robbie Middleby
8	MF	AUS	Ruben Zadkovich
9	FW	AUS	David Zdrilic
10	MF	AUS	Steve Corica
11	FW	AUS	Sasho Petrovski
12	MF	AUS	David Carney
13	FW	NZL	Jeremy Brockie
14	FW	AUS	Alex Brosque

No.	Pos.	Nation	Player
15	MF	NIR	Terry McFlynn
16	DF	AUS	Mark Milligan
17	DF	AUS	Jacob Timpano
18	FW	AUS	Adam Casey
19	FW	TTO	Dwight Yorke
19	FW	AUS	Luka Glavas
20	GK	AUS	Justin Pasfield
21	DF	AUS	Nikolai Topor-Stanley
22	MF	AUS	Matthew Bingley (short term contract)
23	MF	ITA	Benito Carbone (guest player)
24	FW	CIV	Jonas Salley (short term contract)
27	MF	AUS	Joel Theissen (short term contract)
28	MF	AUS	Tallan Martin (short term contract)
30	GK	AUS	Dean Bouzanis (on loan from Liverpool F.C.)

- Coaches: Terry Butcher, Branko Culina

=== Transfers in ===
Player	From	Fee	Date	Contract length
(Australia) Alex Brosque	(Australia) Queensland Roar FC	—	11 February 2006	3 years
(Australia) Ruben Zadkovich	(Australia) Sydney FC (promoted from short-term deal)	—	5 March 2006	2 years
(New Zealand) Jeremy Brockie	New Zealand Knights FC	—	16 March 2006	2 years
(Australia) Adam Casey	New Zealand Knights FC	—	30 January 2007	2 years
(Australia) Dean Bouzanis	(England) Liverpool F.C. (on loan)	—	4 February 2007	to Jan 2008
(Australia) Nikolai Topor-Stanley	(Australia) Sydney FC (promoted from short-term deal)	—	13 February 2007	4 months (ACL)
(Australia) Noel Spencer	(Australia) Central Coast Mariners	—	13 February 2007	6 months
(Australia) Nikolas Tsattalios	(Australia) NSW Institute of Sport	—	13 February 2007	4 months (ACL)
(Australia) Luka Glavas	(Australia) Perth Glory	—	13 February 2007	4 months (ACL)

==== Transfers out ====
Player	To	Fee	Date	Notes
(Australia) Matthew Bingley	Released	—		
(United States) Alejandro Salazar	Contract was not renewed	-		
(Australia) Steve Laurie	Released	-		
(Australia) Andrew Packer	(Australia) Queensland Roar FC	—	23 March 2006	Released early from two-year contract
(Trinidad and Tobago) Dwight Yorke	(England) Sunderland AFC	A$500,000	31 August 2006	Released early from two-year contract
(Australia) Sasho Petrovski	(Australia) Central Coast Mariners	—	12 February 2007	Released early (contract to end April 2007)
(Australia) Wade Oostendorp	Released	—		
(Australia) Alvin Ceccoli	(Japan) Avispa Fukuoka	—	16 February 2007	Released
(New Zealand) Jeremy Brockie	Released	—	6 March 2007	Released early for personal reasons

==== Short-term signings ====
Player	From	Fee	Start date	End date	Reason
(Australia) Nikolai Topor-Stanley	(Australia) Manly United FC	—	7 July 2006	24 November 2006	Injury cover for Jacob Timpano and Ruben Zadkovich
(Australia) Matthew Bingley	(Australia) Hamilton Olympic	—	5 September 2006	5 November 2006	Injury cover for Robbie Middleby
(Australia) Joel Theissen		—	7 September 2006	30 October 2006	Injury cover for David Carney
(Italy) Benito Carbone	Unattached	—	28 September 2006	17 October 2006	Four-match "guest stint", released early due to injury
(Australia) Tallan Martin	(Australia) Sydney United	—	17 January 2007	26 January 2007	Two-match contract to cover for Jeremy Brockie (international duty with New Zealand).
(Australia) Nikolai Topor-Stanley		—	18 January 2007	2 February 2007	Injury cover for Jacob Timpano.
(Ivory Coast) Jonas Salley	New Zealand Knights FC	—	31 January 2007	2 February 2007	Injury cover for Terry McFlynn for remainder of finals series.

== Team kit ==
Sydney retained playing strip from the previous season, supplied by Reebok, and shirt sponsorship with Healthe continued. The home and away strips were modified for the club's Asian Champions League campaign in early 2007, adding a gold trim for the tournament.

2006–07 home colours	2006–07 away colours	2006–07 goalkeeper

== Competitions ==
=== Overall ===
Competition	Started round	Final position / round	First match	Last match
Pre-season Challenge Cup	Group stage	3rd	15 July 2006	19 August 2006
A-League	—	4th	27 August 2006	20 January 2007
A-League Finals Series	Semi-finals	Semi-finalists	26 January 2006	2 February 2007
AFC Champions League	Group stage	Group stage	7 March 2007	23 May 2007

=== Preseason Challenge Cup ===
==== Group table ====
Pos	Team	Pld	W	D	L	GF	GA	BP	Pts	Qualification
1	Sydney FC	4	3	1	0	7	2	2	12	Advance to semi-finals
2	Newcastle Jets FC	4	0	2	2	4	6	1	3	Advance to semi-finals
3	New Zealand Knights	4	0	3	1	2	3	0	3	
4	Queensland Roar	4	0	3	1	2	3	0	3	

==== Matches ====
15 July 2006 1	Queensland Roar	1–2	Sydney FC	Gold Coast
18:00 AEST	Smits 31'		Petrovski 16'; Brosque 87'	Stadium: Carrara Stadium; Attendance: 7,132; Referee: Peter Green

22 July 2006 2	Sydney FC	2–1	Newcastle Jets	Canberra
17:00 UTC+10	Topor-Stanley 2'; Middleby 25'		McFlynn 68' (o.g.)	Stadium: Canberra Stadium; Attendance: 7,226; Referee: Ben Williams

29 July 2006 3	New Zealand Knights	0–0	Sydney FC	Auckland
12:00 NZDT				Stadium: North Harbour Stadium; Attendance: 3,121; Referee: Peter O'Leary

6 August 2006 Bonus Round	Sydney FC	3–0	Perth Glory	Wollongong
	Brosque 26', 27'; Petrovski 57'	Report		Stadium: WIN Stadium; Attendance: 6,634; Referee: Strebre Delovski

Knockout Stage

11 August 2006 Semi-final	Sydney FC	1–2	Adelaide United	Wollongong
19:30 AEST	Carney 43'		Dodd 16'; Rees 90'	Stadium: WIN Stadium; Attendance: 4,210; Referee: Mark Shield

19 August 2006 Third place play-off	Sydney FC	2–0	Newcastle Jets	Campbelltown
19:30 AEST			Dodd 16'; Rees 90'	Stadium: Campbelltown Stadium; Attendance: 5,326; Referee: Strebe Delovski

=== A-League ===
==== League table ====
Pos	Team	Pld	W	D	L	GF	GA	GD	Pts	Qualification
1	Melbourne Victory (C)	21	14	3	4	41	20	+21	45	Qualification for 2008 AFC Champions League group stage and Finals series
2	Adelaide United	21	10	3	8	32	27	+5	33	Qualification for 2008 AFC Champions League group stage and Finals series
3	Newcastle Jets	21	8	6	7	32	30	+2	30	Qualification for Finals series
4	Sydney FC	21	8	8	5	29	19	+10	29 (Note: Sydney FC were penalised three competition points following round 18 due to salary cap breaches which occurred during the 2005–06 season)	Qualification for Finals series
5	Queensland Roar	21	8	5	8	25	27	−2	29	
6	Central Coast Mariners	21	6	6	9	22	26	−4	24	
7	Perth Glory	21	5	5	11	24	30	−6	20	
8	New Zealand Knights (Note: New Zealand Knights cannot qualify for the AFC Champions League as they are not recognised as an AFC club.)	21	5	4	12	13	39	−26	19	Disbanded at end of season

Source: ultimatealeague.com
Rules for classification: 1) points; 2) goal difference; 3) number of goals scored.
(C) Champions

==== Matches ====
27 August 2006 1	Sydney FC	1–0	Central Coast Mariners	Sydney
17:00 UTC+10	Fyfe 52'	Report		Stadium: Sydney Football Stadium; Attendance: 19,274; Referee: Mark Shield

2 September 2006 2	Melbourne Victory	3–2	Sydney FC	Melbourne
	Muscat 11' (pen.); Allsopp 8', 51'	Report	Vargas 84' (o.g.); Fyfe 18'	Stadium: Telstra Dome; Attendance: 39,730; Referee: Mark Shield

10 September 2006 3	Perth Glory	1–1	Sydney FC	Perth
	Coyne 69'	Report	Petrovski 36'	Stadium: Members Equity Stadium; Attendance: 7,229; Referee: Simon Przydacz

17 September 2006 4	Sydney FC	2–2	Newcastle Jets	Sydney
	Zdrillic 38'; Corica 33' (pen.)	Report	Rodriguez 45', 62'	Stadium: Sydney Football Stadium; Attendance: 15,488; Referee: Matthew Breeze

21 September 2006 5	New Zealand Knights	0–1	Sydney FC	Auckland
		Report	Rudan 58'	Stadium: North Harbour Stadium; Attendance: 2,764; Referee: Ben Williams

2 October 2006 6	Adelaide United	1–4	Sydney FC	Adelaide
	Burns 54'	Report	Carbone 85'; Petrovski 80'; Dodd 57' (o.g.); Zadkovich 36'	Stadium: Hindmarsh Stadium; Attendance: 15,119; Referee: Mark Shield

8 October 2006 7	Sydney FC	1–1	Queensland Roar	Sydney
	Ceccoli 45'	Report	Dilevski 15'	Stadium: Sydney Football Stadium; Attendance: 17,274; Referee: Matthew Breeze

13 October 2006 8	Central Coast Mariners	3–1	Sydney FC	Gosford
	Mori 52', 90'; O'Grady 40'	Report	Carbone 12'	Stadium: Bluetongue Stadium; Attendance: 11,567; Referee: Simon Przydacz

21 October 2006 9	Sydney FC	1–2	Melbourne Victory	Sydney
	Corica 9'	Report	Thompson 50', 73'	Stadium: Sydney Football Stadium; Attendance: 20,881; Referee: Mark Shield

29 October 2006 10	Sydney FC	1–1	Perth Glory	Sydney
	Zdrillic 15'	Report	Glavas 75'	Stadium: Sydney Football Stadium; Attendance: 12,316; Referee: Ben Williams

4 November 2006 11	Newcastle Jets	1–1	Sydney FC	Newcastle
	Brown 86'	Report	Zdrillic 14'	Stadium: EnergyAustralia Stadium; Attendance: 8,493; Referee: Mark Shield

10 November 2006 12	Sydney FC	4–0	New Zealand Knights	Sydney
	Petrovski 37', 53'; Zdrillic 65'; Carney 89'	Report		Stadium: Sydney Football Stadium; Attendance: 9,871; Referee: Angelo Nardi

19 November 2006 13	Sydney FC	2–1	Adelaide United	Sydney
	Talay 15' (pen.); Rudan 22'	Report	Aloisi 9'	Stadium: Sydney Football Stadium; Attendance: 14,308; Referee: Matthew Breeze

24 November 2006 14	Sydney FC	3–0	Queensland Roar	Sydney
	Talay 23' (pen.); Corica 64'; Middleby 89'	Report		Stadium: Sydney Football Stadium; Attendance: 12,718; Referee: Ben Williams

3 December 2006 15	Central Coast Mariners	0–0	Sydney FC	Gosford
		Report		Stadium: Bluetongue Stadium; Attendance: 12,457; Referee: Matthew Breeze

8 December 2006 16	Melbourne Victory	0–0	Sydney FC	Melbourne
		Report		Stadium: Telstra Dome; Attendance: 50,333; Referee: Mark Shield

14 December 2006 17	Sydney FC	1–0	Perth Glory	Sydney
	Brosque 80'	Report		Stadium: Sydney Football Stadium; Attendance: 11,816; Referee: Simon Przydacz

1 January 2007 18	Newcastle Jets	0–2	Sydney FC	Newcastle
		Report	Brosque 46'; Petrovski 90+1'	Stadium: EnergyAustralia Stadium; Attendance: 20,980; Referee: Matthew Breeze

7 January 2007 19	Sydney FC	0–1	New Zealand Knights	Sydney
		Report	Bunce 16'	Stadium: Sydney Football Stadium; Attendance: 16,040; Referee: Simon Przydacz

14 January 2007 20	Adelaide United	1–0	Sydney FC	Adelaide
	Fernando 89'	Report		Stadium: Hindmarsh Stadium; Attendance: 14,704; Referee: Matthew Breeze

20 January 2007 21	Queensland Roar	1–1	Sydney FC	Brisbane
	Mori 20'	Report	Brosque 13'	Stadium: Suncorp Stadium; Attendance: 32,371; Referee: Mark Shield

==== Minor semi-final ====
11 August 2006 First-leg	Sydney FC	2–1	Newcastle Jets	Sydney
20:00 UTC+11	Brosque 15'; Milligan 30'	Report	Rodriguez 71'	Stadium: Sydney Football Stadium; Attendance: 21,112; Referee: Peter Green

19 August 2006 Second-leg	Newcastle Jets	2–0 (3–2 agg.)	Sydney FC	Newcastle
	Griffiths 57'; Coveny 71'	Report		Stadium: EnergyAustralia Stadium; Attendance: 24,338; Referee: Matthew Breeze

=== AFC Champions League ===
==== Group stage ====
7 March 2007 1	Shanghai Shenhua (China)	1–2	(Australia) Sydney FC	Shanghai, China
17:00 UTC+10	Xie Hui 78'	(Report)	Steve Corica 8'; Ufuk Talay 23'	Stadium: Yuanshen Stadium; Attendance: 12,000; Referee: Lee Gi-Young (South Korea)hield]]

21 March 2007 2	Sydney FC (Australia)	2–2	(Japan) Urawa Red Diamonds	Sydney, Australia
	David Carney 1'; Ufuk Talay 23' (pen.)	(Report)	Robson Ponte 30'; Yuichiro Nagai 55'	Stadium: Sydney Football Stadium; Attendance: 21,010; Referee: Subkhiddin Mohd Salleh (Malaysia)

12 April 2007 3	Persik Kediri (Indonesia)	2–1	(Australia) Sydney FC	Sur akarta, Indonesia
	Aris Budi Prasetyo 25'; Budi Sudarsono 70'	(Report)	Steve Corica 8'	Stadium: Manahan Stadium; Attendance: 15,000; Referee: Abdullah Balideh (Qatar)

25 April 2007 4	Sydney FC (Australia)	3–0	(Indonesia) Persik Kediri	Parramatta, Australia
	Steve Corica 54', 90'; Alex Brosque 73'	(Report)	Rodriguez 45', 62'	Stadium: Parramatta Stadium; Attendance: 10,075; Referee: Minh Tri Vo (Vietnam)

9 May 2007 5	Sydney FC (Australia)	0–0	(China) Shanghai Shenhua	Sydney, Australia
		(Report 1 2)		Stadium: Sydney Football Stadium; Attendance: 14,786; Referee: Abdul Bashir (Singapore)

23 May 2007 6	Urawa Red Diamonds (Japan)	0–0	(Australia) Sydney FC	Saitama, Japan
		(Report)		Stadium: Saitama Stadium; Attendance: 44,793; Referee: Fareed Al-Marzouqi (United Arab Emirates)

=== Friendlies ===
21 February 2007

Sutherland Sharks	1–1	Sydney FC
Jimmy Lawrence	(Report)	Alex Brosque

Seymour Shaw Park, Sydney

28 February 2007

Blacktown City Demons	0–2	Sydney FC
	(Report)	David Carney; Iain Fyfe

Fairfax Community Stadium, Sydney

14 March 2007

Wollongong Wolves	2–3	Sydney FC
Ballamodou Conde; Josh Swinton	(Report)	David Zdrilic; Michael Enfield; Luka Glavas

Judy Masters Oval, Wollongong

4 April 2007

Marconi Stallions	0–3	Sydney FC
	(Report)	Nikolai Topor-Stanley; Luka Glavas; Adam Casey

Marconi Stadium, Sydney

18 April 2007

Bankstown City Lions	1–2	Sydney FC
Nahuel Arrarte	(Report)	Alex Brosque; David Carney

Jensen Oval, Sydney
Attendance: ~3,000

2 May 2007

Penrith Nepean United	2–2	Sydney FC
Danny Wells (pen); Brad Boardman	(Report)	David Zdrillic (2)

CUA Stadium, Sydney
Attendance: ~4,000

16 May 2007

Sydney FC	2–0	Malaysia
Noel Spencer; David Zdrillic	(Report)

Sydney United Sports Centre, Sydney
