= Joel Theissen =

Australian soccer player

Personal information
- Full name: Joel Theissen
- Date of birth: 12 August 1985 (age 41)
- Place of birth: Windsor, New South Wales, Australia
- Height: 5 ft 7 in (1.70 m)
- Position: Midfielder

Youth career
- Australian Institute of Sport

College career
Years	Team	Apps	(Gls)
2008	New Mexico Lobos	0	(0)
2009–2011	Rio Grande RedStorm		

Senior career*
Years	Team	Apps	(Gls)
2003–2004	Newcastle United Jets	0	(0)
2004–2005	Central Coast United		
2005–2006	Parramatta Melita Eagles		
2006	Sydney FC	1	(0)
2007	Marconi Stallions		
2007	Sydney Olympic		
2008	Cape Cod Crusaders	10	(1)
2009–2010	Ottawa Fury	29	(0)
2011–2012	GPS Portland Phoenix	24	(4)

International career^{‡}
- Australia U20
- Australia U23
- * Club domestic league appearances and goals as of 1 July 2011 ‡ National team caps and goals as of 23 May 2009

Joel Theissen (born 12 August 1986 in Windsor, New South Wales) is an Australian footballer who last played for GPS Portland Phoenix in the USL Premier Development League.

== Career ==
=== Early career ===
A left-sided midfielder or defender, Thiessen attended the Australian Institute of Sport, and played with former NSL side Newcastle United, before catching the eye of Sydney FC head coach Terry Butcher. Thiessen was placed on a short-term contract the A-League club in September 2006 to cover for the injured Robbie Middleby, and played in one senior game for the team before leaving to play for Marconi Stallions and Sydney Olympic.

=== United States ===
In March 2008 Thiessen re-located to the United States to attend college at the University of New Mexico. After failing to be cleared by the NCAA clearinghouse he moved on to the University of Rio Grande in the NAIA. He played with the Cape Cod Crusaders in the USL Premier Development League during his 2008 collegiate off-season. In March 2009 he signed with the Ottawa Fury for the 2009 Premier Development League season, and played two seasons with the team, before moving to GPS Portland Phoenix in 2011.
