= Alina Barlow =

Australian businesswoman and socialite (born 1978–79)

- Born: 1978 or 1979 (age 46–47); Saint Petersburg, Russia
- Education: University of Sydney (BCom)
- Spouse: Scott Barlow (m. 2006; div. 2024)
- Children: 2
- Relatives: David Traktovenko (stepfather)

Alina Barlow (born 1978 or 1979) is a Russian-born Australian businesswoman, jewellery designer and socialite. She owns the A-League soccer club Sydney FC.

== Early life and education ==
Alina Barlow was born in Saint Petersburg, Russia, in 1978 or 1979. At age 11, Barlow's parents divorced, and her mother, Tonya, began dating David Traktovenko, a billionaire banker.

Barlow studied economics in Saint Petersburg before moving to Sydney, Australia, in 1999, where she attained a Bachelor of Commerce from the University of Sydney.

== Career ==
After graduating, Barlow became a chartered accountant and later worked in marketing for Sydney FC, which was operated by her stepfather at the time. In 2015, she founded Alinka, a jewellery brand.

Since 2012, Barlow has taken an active role at Sydney FC, and is now considered to be the team's owner. She has been the director of the Sydney FC Foundation since 2025.

== Personal life ==
From 2006 to 2024, Barlow was married to businessman Scott Barlow, with whom she has two children. She is a close friend of socialite Terry Biviano, and is a member of the Sydney Children's Hospitals Foundation's Gold Dinner Committee.
