= Robbie Middleby =

Australian soccer player

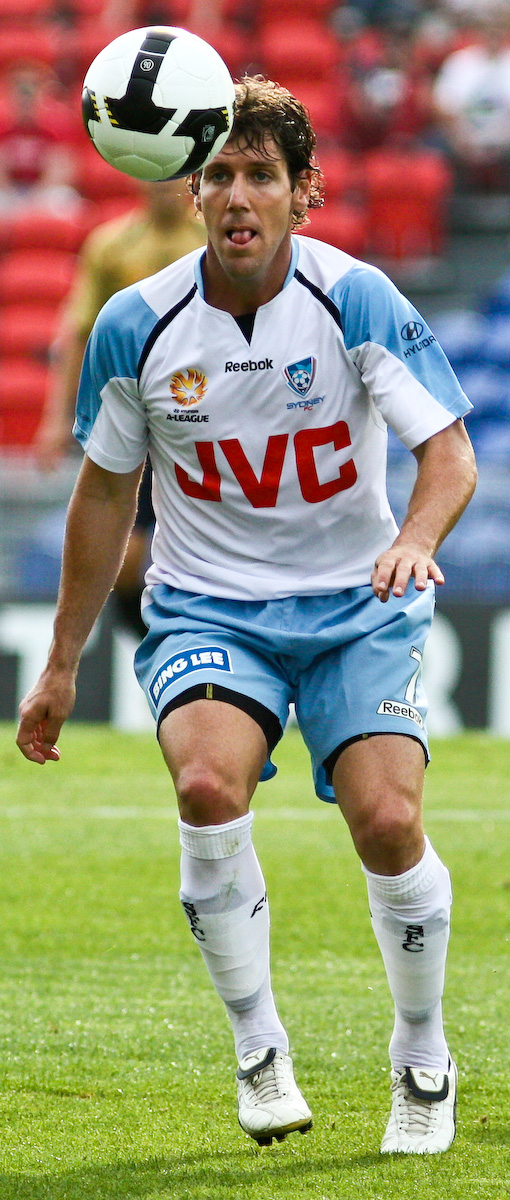
- Middleby playing for Sydney FC in 2008

Personal information
- Full name: Robert Middleby
- Date of birth: 9 August 1975 (age 51)
- Place of birth: Newcastle, Australia
- Height: 1.73 m (5 ft 8 in)
- Positions: Right-back; right midfielder

Youth career
- 1992–1993: AIS

Senior career*
Years	Team	Apps	(Gls)
1993–1994	Newcastle Breakers		
1994	Adamstown Rosebud	9	(1)
1994–1996	Wollongong Wolves	35	(1)
1997–1999	KFC Uerdingen 05	27	(0)
1999–2000	Auckland Kingz	21	(1)
2000	Cringila Lions		
2000–2001	Carlton SC	8	(0)
2000–2001	Wollongong Wolves	19	(1)
2001–2004	Newcastle United Jets	62	(6)
2005–2009	Sydney FC	67	(3)
2009–2010	North Queensland Fury	21	(0)
2013–2015	Green Suburbs	25	(12)
2016–2017	Valentine Eleebana		

International career
1994–1995	Australia U-20	10	(7)
2002	Australia	5	(0)
Medal record
Representing Australia
Men's Association football
OFC Nations Cup
Runner-up	2002 New Zealand
OFC U-20 Championship
Winner	1994 Fiji
- * Club domestic league appearances and goals

Robert Middleby (born 9 August 1975) is an Australian former football player who as a right-back or right midfielder. He was the CEO of the Newcastle Jets FC until 2015. He played for Sydney FC after earlier stints at Newcastle United Jets, Wollongong Wolves (twice), Carlton, Football Kingz and the Newcastle Breakers. He won the 2001 NSL title with the Wolves and the 2006 A-League title with Sydney FC and also spent time overseas with German outfit KFC Uerdingen 05.

== Career ==
=== Sydney FC ===
Middleby was born in Newcastle, New South Wales, Australia. He saw little game time under coach Pierre Littbarski in his first season at the club, playing only 212 minutes in 16 appearances despite scoring in Sydney FC's 3–1 victory against New Zealand Knights early in the campaign. He gained favour, though, under Littbarski's replacement Terry Butcher and was a regular starter in the 2006–07 season. Despite missing part of the season with a broken collarbone after a controversial off-the-ball incident involving Melbourne Victory FC defender Adrian Leijer, Middleby was voted Sydney FC Players' Player of the Year for the season.

Middleby accidentally broke David Beckham's rib, when Sydney FC played the Los Angeles Galaxy at ANZ Stadium in November 2007. Middleby also scored in this match.

=== North Queensland Fury ===
In November 2008, Middleby signed a contract with North Queensland Fury. He has been used in his more preferred role of right back, as well as being used in central midfield under coach Ian Ferguson. On 11 February 2010, he announced his retirement from professional football at the end of the 2009–10 season Middleby played his last game against Gold Coast United FC, which North Queensland won 2–1.

=== Newcastle Jets ===
Middleby resigned as CEO for the Newcastle Jets FC in the A-League in January 2015. Upon retiring, Middleby said "I will use the next few weeks to support the mid-season review process".

== Career statistics ==
Appearances and goals by national team and year
National team	Year	Apps	Goals
Australia	2002	5	0
Total		5	0

== Honours ==
Sydney FC

- A-League Championship: 2005–06
- Oceania Club Championship: 2004–05

Wollongong Wolves

- NSL Championship: 2000–2001
- Oceania Club Championship: 2000–01

Australia

- OFC Nations Cup: runner-up 2002

Australia U-20

- OFC U-20 Championship: 1994

Individual:

- Sydney FC Player of the Year: 2006–07
