= Walter Bugno =

Australian businessman

Walter Bugno is the chief executive officer of IGT International a division of IGT plc

== Life and career ==
Bugno was previously the chief executive officer of Bokks, the London-based global luxury brand supply network. From 2006 to 2009 he was chief executive officer of the casino division of Australia's Tabcorp Holdings Ltd. From 2002 to 2006 he was the president of Campbell Arnott's Asia Pacific. Prior to that, Bugno was the managing director of Lion Nathan Australia, a division of Lion Nathan Ltd.

He was chairman of A-League club Sydney FC during their inaugural season, but announced his decision to step down in September 2006, citing difficulty in holding roles in both Tabcorp and Sydney FC.

Bugno has a bachelor of commerce and a master of commerce from the University of New South Wales.

He was born in Wollongong on 8 January 1960 and then returned to Italy until finally moving back to Australia at the age of 17. Walter Bugno attended Patrician Brothers' College, Fairfield where he introduced football(soccer) to the school curriculum.
