= Scott Barlow (businessman) =

Australian businessman (born 1976)

Scott Barlow (born 23 July 1976) is an Australian businessman. He is the founder of STRADA Group and the Chairman of Sydney FC from 2012 to 2025.

== Early life and education ==
Barlow holds a Bachelor of Commerce from the University of Tasmania and a Graduate Certificate in Applied Finance and Investment from the Securities Institute of Australia.

== Career ==
=== Property ===
In 2005, Barlow started property development and funds management firm STRADA. Based in Sydney, STRADA specialises in commercial funds management and luxury residential development.

=== Sydney FC ===
Barlow was the chairman of Sydney FC from 2012 until 2025, and had been a member of the board since the club's inception in 2005. Barlow served as Vice Chairman of Sydney FC from 2009 to 2012. Between 2009 and 2011, Barlow was a member of the FIFA committee for club football representing Australia.

== Personal life ==
From 2006 to 2024, Barlow was married to socialite and businesswoman Alina Barlow, with whom he has two children.
