= Sydney FC =

- Full name: Sydney Football Club
- Nickname: The Sky Blues
- Short name: Sydney FC
- Founded: 8 September 2004; 22 years ago
- Ground: Allianz Stadium
- Capacity: 42,500
- Coordinates: 33°53′21″S 151°13′31″E
- Owner: Alina Barlow
- Chairman: Jan Voss
- Head Coach: Patrick Kisnorbo
- League: A-League Men
- 2025–26: 5th of 12; Finals: Runners-up
- Website: sydneyfc.com
Home colours	Away colours

Sydney Football Club, commonly known as Sydney FC, is a professional soccer club based in Sydney, New South Wales, Australia. They compete in the top-tier men's league in Australia, the A-League Men. Established in 2004, they were among the eight founding teams for the inaugural 2005–06 A-League season.

Domestically, Sydney FC have won a record five A-League Men Championships, four A-League Men Premierships and two Australia Cups. Additionally, the club has won the OFC Champions League once in international competition.

Before the 2018–19 season, the club’s home ground was the Allianz Stadium in Moore Park. When the NSW Government announced that the stadium would be redeveloped before the 2019 New South Wales state election, the team temporarily played at the Sydney Cricket Ground, Jubilee Oval and Leichhardt Oval. In October 2022, the club returned to the newly rebuilt Allianz Stadium. In 2023, Sydney FC completed their new training and administration facility, Sky Park, in North Ryde.

During the club's first seven years, it was the only A-League team in Sydney, attracting a broad fanbase across the Sydney Metropolitan Area. Sydney FC are Australia's most supported A-League club, with 693,000 fans as of 2023. Its leading supporter group, "The Cove," derives its name from Sydney Cove, a bay on the southern shore of Sydney Harbour. They compete in the local Sydney Derby against cross-town rivals Western Sydney Wanderers. As the two most decorated clubs in the A-League Men and fierce inter-state rivals, the club also shares a long-standing rivalry with Melbourne Victory, known as The Big Blue.

Alex Brosque is the club's all-time top goal scorer, with 83 goals in all competitions. Rhyan Grant has the most appearances for the club, having played 415 games.

== History ==
=== 2004–2009: Foundation Years ===
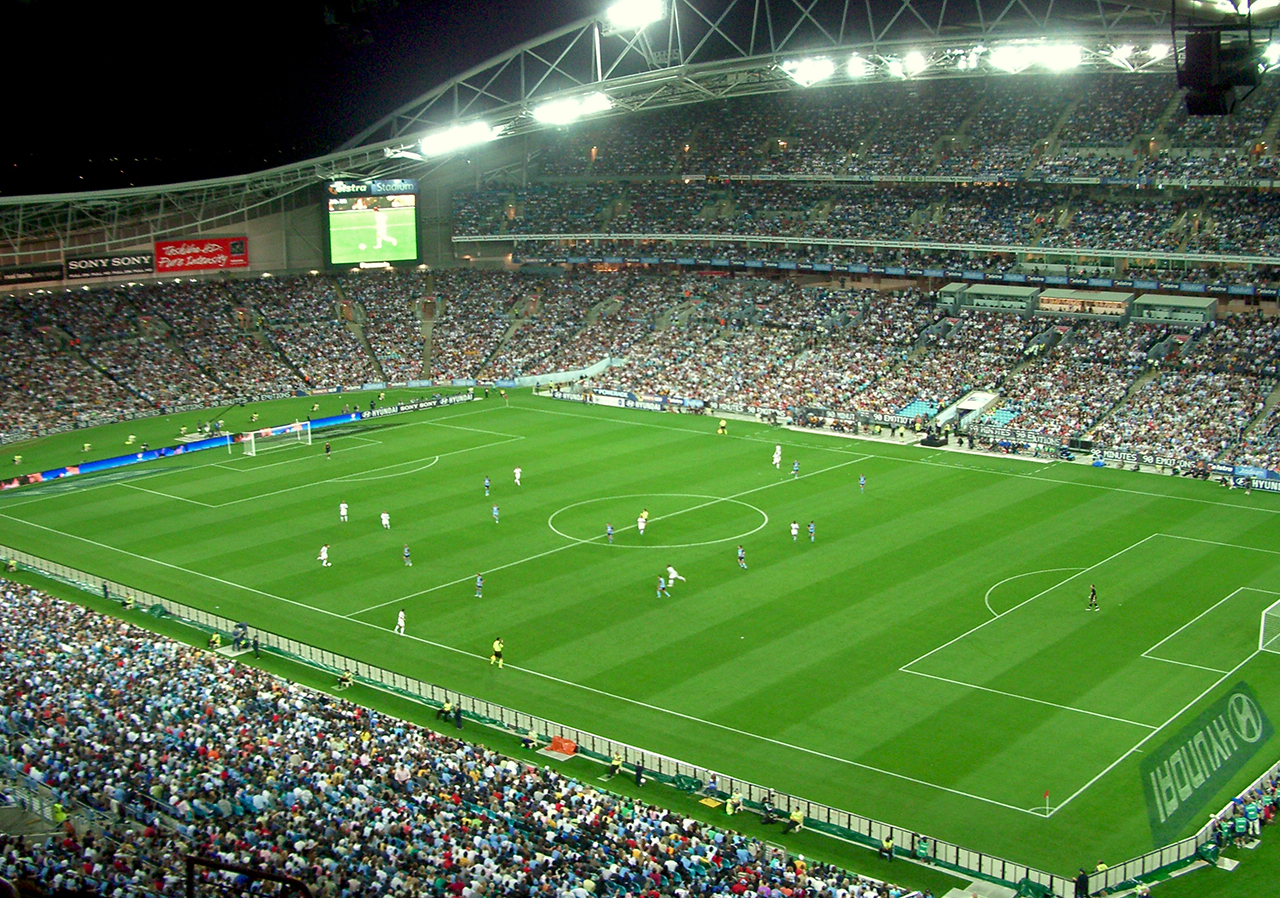
Sydney FC playing the Los Angeles Galaxy at ANZ Stadium in 2007.

The first steps towards the foundation of Sydney FC were taken in April 2004 when Soccer New South Wales (now Football NSW) announced its intention to bid for a licence in the new A-League competition. The bid was lodged with the Australian Soccer Association (now Football Australia) on 19 July, challenged only by a consortium headed by Nick Politis, known as the "Sydney Blues", for Sydney's place in the 'one team per city' competition. A public row broke out between the two bidders after reports that the ASA were set to vote in favour of Sydney FC, causing Politis to withdraw his support for a team, and leaving Sydney FC as the only candidate remaining.

Sydney FC was officially launched as a member of the new 8-team A-League on 1 November 2004, with a 25% stake in the club held by Soccer NSW, the remainder privately owned. Walter Bugno was announced as the inaugural chairman of the club. On 11 December 2004, Soccer NSW announced that it would pull out of its involvement with Sydney FC amid concerns over part owner Frank Lowy's autocratic style in establishing the club and lack of consultation with Soccer NSW on key Sydney FC issues. These included the choice of the Sydney Football Stadium over Parramatta Stadium as the team's home ground, and the erosion of Soccer NSW's initial 100 per cent involvement to just 25 per cent.

By February 2005, Sydney FC had filled 16 of its allowed 20 squad positions—attracting Socceroos Alvin Ceccoli, Clint Bolton, Steve Corica and David Zdrilic as well as youth internationals Justin Pasfield, Mark Milligan, Wade Oostendorp, Iain Fyfe and Jacob Timpano. German Pierre Littbarski was signed as head coach, assisted by former Norwich City player Ian Crook. Sydney FC played its first ever match against Manly United on 25 March 2005, winning 6–1. Shortly after, Sydney FC set off on a tour to the United Arab Emirates to play against local teams FC Hatta, Al Ain and Al Jazira, winning all three. While in Dubai, Sydney FC announced that it had agreed to terms with former Manchester United player Dwight Yorke as the club's "marquee player"– one paid outside of the $1.5million salary cap— for two seasons.

Sydney FC's first competitive match was against Queensland Roar at Central Coast Stadium in Gosford as part of the 2005 Australian Club World Championship Qualifying Tournament. After winning 3–0, Sydney went on to defeat Perth Glory and Central Coast Mariners to qualify for the 2005 Oceania Club Championship, held in Tahiti. Despite an early scare against New Zealand club Auckland City, Sydney FC won all of its matches and qualified for the 2005 FIFA Club World Championship in Japan. The start of the 2005 A-League Pre-Season Challenge Cup marked Sydney FC's first match at Allianz Stadium, as well as Dwight Yorke's first appearance for the club. Yorke scored the first goal of Sydney FC's 3–1 win which stretched its unbeaten run to 9 competitive matches (15 including friendlies). Upon reaching the semi-finals, Sydney's unbeaten run finally ended at 11 with Perth Glory midfielder Nick Ward scoring in injury time to inflict the new club's first ever loss.

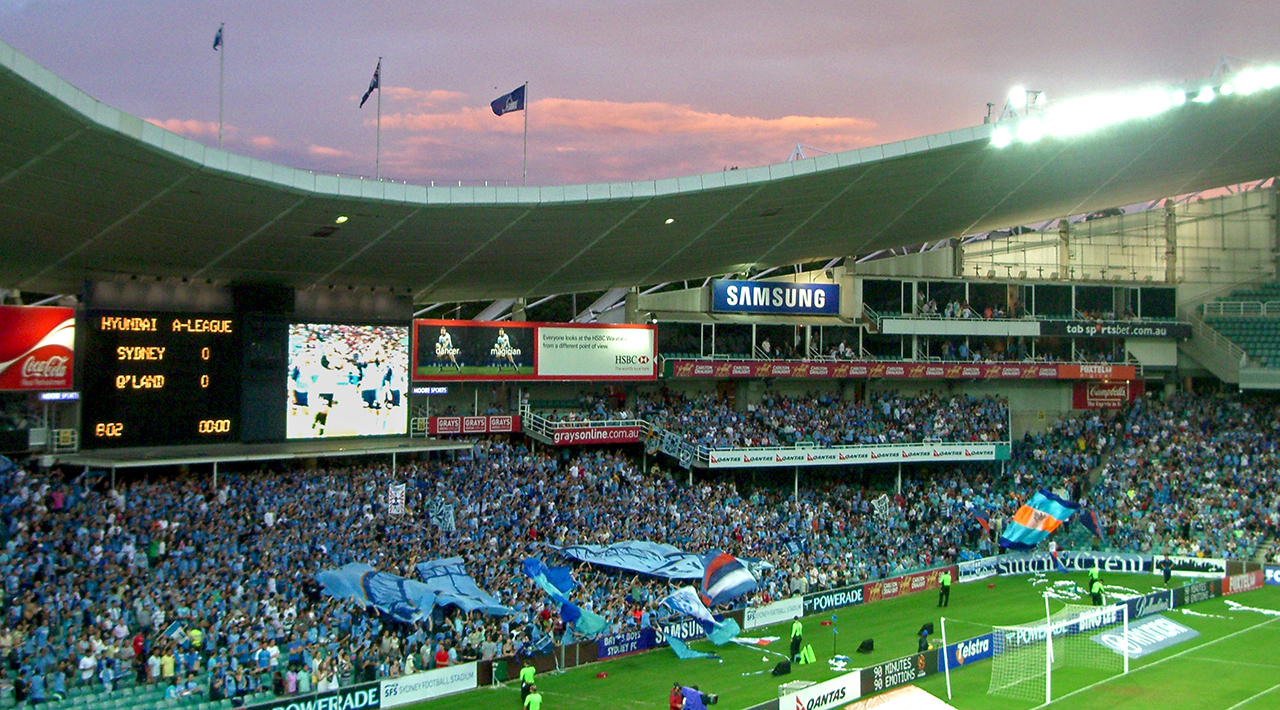
Sydney supporters during a match in 2008

Sydney FC's first season was ultimately a success. Finishing second behind Adelaide United they went on to defeat Central Coast Mariners 1–0 in the 2006 A-League Grand Final with Steve Corica scoring in the second half of the game. However, the club's success wouldn't last long, with German manager Pierre Littbarski leaving the club after refusing to accept a lower salary and inaugural marquee player Dwight Yorke being signed by Premier League club Sunderland. Former English international Terry Butcher was signed as Sydney FC's new coach for 2006–07. However it was regarded as an overall failure, with Sydney playing poorly despite the signing of Alex Brosque and Benito Carbone as a Guest player. Sydney also had 3 points deducted during the season, after it was found that they had breached the Salary cap, involving player David Zdrillic. Despite the off field problems, Sydney managed to scrape into the finals series, however they lost in the semi-final to Newcastle Jets. Although Butcher led the club into the finals, Sydney fans were unhappy with his tactics. In the end Butcher and Sydney FC went their separate ways at the end of the season. Sydney FC would go on to sign Branko Čulina for its 2007 AFC Champions League campaign, where they finished second in the group, one point behind ultimate champions and J-League heavyweights Urawa Red Diamonds. Despite the ACL success, Sydney FC's start to the 2007–08 season was poor, and the club sacked him, replacing him with former Adelaide United manager John Kosmina. Sydney FC played well for the rest of the season but were knocked out in the finals by Brisbane Roar. Kosmina couldn't repeat the success of the previous season, replacing Brazilian international Juninho with Socceroos hero John Aloisi on a million dollar contract. The club also unveiled Newcastle Jets championship winners Mark Bridge and Stuart Musialik as well as Socceroo Simon Colosimo for the 2008–09 season. The season did not live up to expectations even with these key signings. Aloisi didn't perform very well during the season and came under heavy fire. So too did manager Kosmina, whose tactics were seen as controversial. His relationship with the media often became angry and frustrated which didn't help causes. Many players fell out of favour with the coach, including Steve Corica and Clint Bolton. For the first time in the club's history, they failed to make the Finals. As a result Kosmina was fired when Russian billionaire David Traktovenko became owner in March 2009.

=== 2009–2012: The Lavička Double ===
The fresh change at the club was about to bear fruit, when Sydney announced they had signed Czech Republic manager Vítězslav Lavička. Lavicka completely changed the structure of the club, and for its first time turning it into a serious, European style soccer club. He kept faith in Steve Corica and John Aloisi and several others who had threatened to walk out, and as a result, Sydney FC won its first premiership. Sydney made it to the Grand Final of the fifth season of the A-League after defeating Wellington Phoenix in the preliminary final. The Grand Final was played against Melbourne Victory at Etihad Stadium in Melbourne. Sydney took the lead after 61 minutes through a Mark Bridge header, just seconds after Melbourne had a goal disallowed for offside. Melbourne equalised through Adrian Leijer in the 81st minute, and the game went to a penalty shootout with no goals scored in extra time. Melbourne skipper Kevin Muscat missed his penalty, with his shot hitting the post. Sydney FC won the Grand Final 4–2 on penalties which handed the club its second Hyundai A-League Championship.

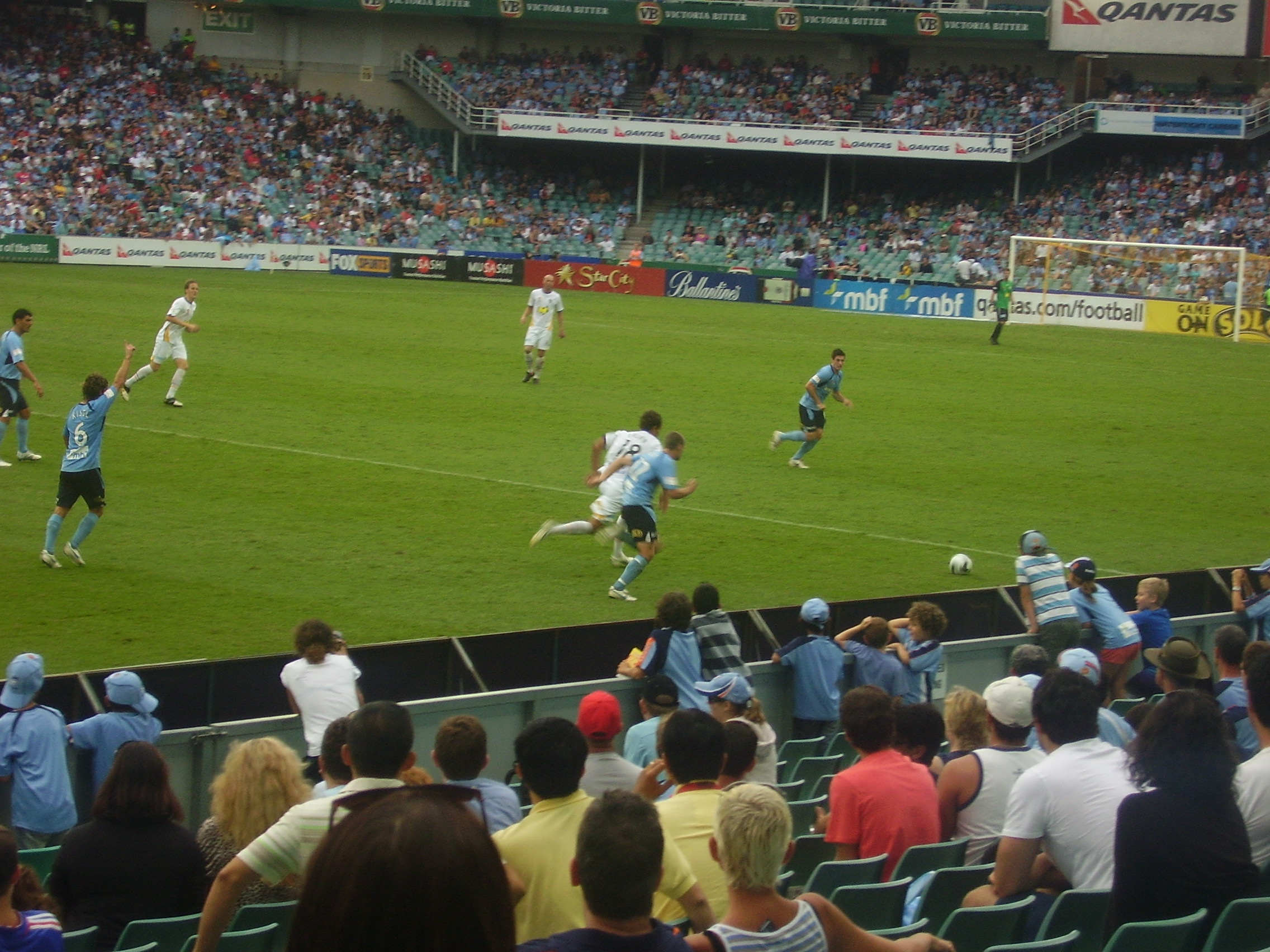
Sydney vs Gold Coast United

Sydney FC's title defence did not go smoothly. The club lost key players from its championship-winning side including Steve Corica (retired), Karol Kisel (return to Europe), Simon Colosimo, John Aloisi, and Clint Bolton (all Melbourne Heart). The club however picked up the services of former Socceroo Nick Carle from his stint in England with Crystal Palace. This wasn't enough to steer the team in the right direction. The club was winless for the first ten rounds of the competition. Sydney FC managed to pick up a few points over the next few rounds but another five-game losing streak ensured they would not qualify for the finals competition, finishing ninth. The third season under Lavicka began with the major signing of Blackburn Rovers player Brett Emerton on a three-year deal. The signing was significant in that Emerton became the first player to directly exchange the FA Premier League for the A-League by terminating his Rovers contract one year early. The season however, only provided minimal success as the club scraped through to the finals series with a 3–2 win over Newcastle Jets in the final round of the regular season. Before the end of the season the club announced that head coach Lavicka's contract would not be renewed for the following season.

=== 2012–2014: Frank Farina and Alessandro Del Piero ===
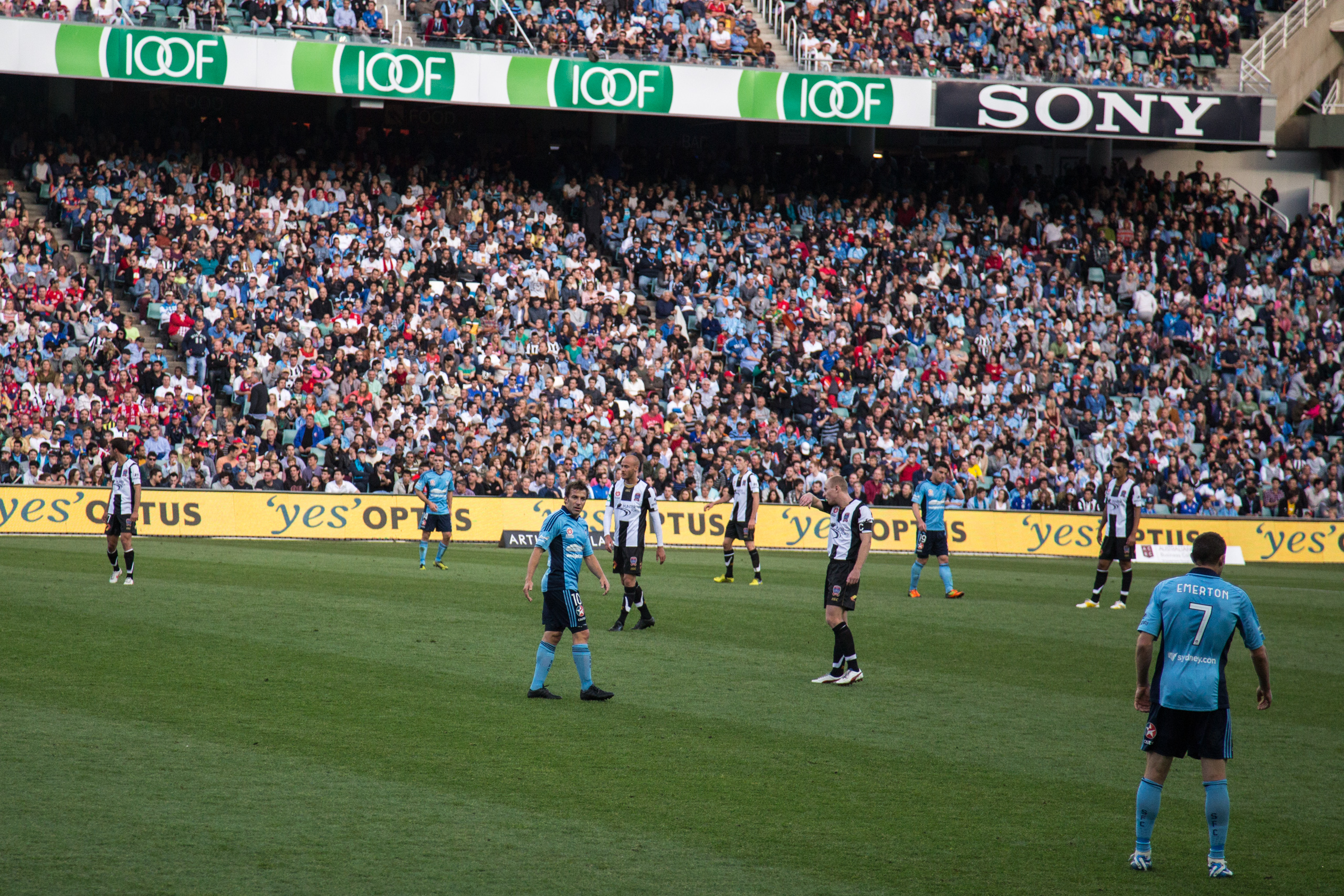
Sydney FC playing against the Newcastle Jets in October 2012.

"This is huge for Sydney FC, huge for the A-League and huge for Australian football. We feel honoured that Alessandro has decided to play for Sydney FC and we share his excitement that a move to Sydney FC will create a lasting legacy for football in this country."

— Sydney FC chairman Scott Barlow, The Sydney Morning Herald

The 2012–13 season was one of high drama. There was a new head coach Ian Crook and a high turnover of players in the off season. The expectations changed from a year of rebuilding to title contenders when the club acquired the services of international superstar Alessandro Del Piero. He signed on for $2 million per year and became the highest-paid player ever in the A-League.

After only six weeks into the regular season Sydney were forced to find a new coach with the shock resignation of Crook. He cited the role was "a constant burden" and was adversely affecting his health. Frank Farina was confirmed as Crook's successor for the season two games into Steve Corica's interim spell. During the January transfer window, Farina bolstered his defensive stocks with Socceroos captain Lucas Neill and Brazilian Tiago Calvano joining the team. The pair made nil significant impact and with a 3–1 loss away from home to Brisbane Roar, Sydney were unable to pick up a vital point that would have seen them play in the finals, finishing seventh.

For the 2013–14 pre season, the club became the first club in A-League history to tour in Europe, as Sydney toured in Venice, Italy, where the club played against Del Piero's first professional club, Padova, Udinese Calcio, Vicenza Calcio, A.S. Cittadella, Venezia and Reggiana. Sydney won half of these six games however upon returning home lost five consecutive friendly games in the lead up to the season proper. Two-thirds of the way into the season and with Sydney FC only accumulating 4 points from 8 games, fans began to express concerns over the vision for the club. Banners at the club's home game against Adelaide included sentiments like "We want Farina gone." There was also a mass exodus from the club's active supporter group, The Cove. The club then held a fan forum to receive questions and communicate the direction of the club. During the last nine rounds, Sydney FC only lost two games making the finals. The club lost to Melbourne Victory in the first week of the finals. This marked the end of the Frank Farina reign.

=== 2014–2018: Graham Arnold and the Golden Era ===

2017 FFA Cup Final starting lineup Sydney FC 2 – 1 Adelaide United

On 8 May 2014, Sydney FC announced its new head coach for the 2014–15 A-League season. With retirements to Brett Emerton in January and Terry McFlynn, and the contract expirations of marquee player Alessandro Del Piero, foreign player Ranko Despotović and former Socceroo Richard Garcia, there was a lot of experience to be filled by the club. Arnold announced his first signing on 12 May 2014, acquiring the services of his former Mariner winger Bernie Ibini-Isei. Sydney FC then announced signings of prolific A-League goalscorer Shane Smeltz and Socceroo Alex Brosque. After months of searching Arnold found his new marquee man in Austria national football team captain Marc Janko. On 8 October 2014, Brosque was announced as captain for the 2014–15 A-League season, alongside vice-captains Sasa Ognenovski and Nikola Petković. Sydney FC's season began with the highly anticipated match-up against the newly re-branded Melbourne City and guest superstar David Villa. Whilst not starting the game, Villa came on early in the second half to claim the equalising goal, the result ending 1–1. Sydney FC continued on an eight-game undefeated streak that ended when Perth Glory came from behind to score two goals in the final seven minutes to claim victory at Allianz Stadium. The following week saw another thrilling Big Blue in Melbourne ending 3–3. Sydney FC struggled for form as they moved closer to the January break for the 2015 Asian Cup, not scoring in four consecutive matches. During this break, Sydney FC were able to bolster their stocks, signing Senegalese internationals Mickaël Tavares and Jacques Faty as injury replacement players. Upon resumption, Sydney FC posted 19 (out of a possible 21) points in the next seven rounds. Whilst slipping up twice at home to Melbourne City and Adelaide United (with scores of 0–1 in both games) during the final six rounds, Sydney FC managed to win all four other games away from home to finish second on the ladder with 50 points for the season. By the end of the regular season, Sydney FC had broken many records including a record club home season attendance (41,213 vs. Western Sydney Wanderers FC) and a league record number of away games undefeated in a season, as well as becoming the first club to score three or more goals in five consecutive games. Marquee Marc Janko also set his own A-League record for most consecutive goalscoring appearances with seven. After having the first week of the finals off, Sydney FC met Adelaide in the semi-finals at home. A brace from Alex Brosque set Sydney up for a 4–1 win. Ultimately, Sydney FC were outplayed in the 2015 A-League Grand Final, defeated by Melbourne Victory 3–0 at Melbourne Rectangular Stadium.

The following season was significantly less successful, finishing seventh in the league despite the star power of marquee Filip Hološko, and Serbian playmaker Miloš Ninković. However, Arnold coached the Sky Blues through a tough Asian Champions League group, finishing first and defeating defending champions Guangzhou Evergrande 2–1 at Allianz. Sydney progressed to the knockout stages for the first time, losing on away goals to Chinese side Shandong Luneng with Hao Junmin scoring a 90th-minute equaliser to finish the Sky Blues continental hopes.

Arnold reformed Sydney for the 2016–17 season, beginning with the signings of Socceroos centreback Alex Wilkinson, and leftback Michael Zullo both from Melbourne City. Joshua Brillante joined the Sky Blues on a three-year deal, keeping him at the Harbour City until 2019. The goalkeeping ranks were soon bolstered by the signing of Danny Vukovic, the A-League's most capped player who also held a record A-League clean sheet tally. Bernie Ibini-Isei also rejoined the club on loan from Club Brugge, following a horrific leg injury. The biggest signing however was that of Brazilian striker Bobô on a one-year marquee deal, rejoining his former Beşiktaş teammate Filip Holosko. The season started with a 4–0 win over rivals Western Sydney in the Sydney Derby with new striker Bobô scoring on debut. They went on a six-game winning streak from this, conceding one goal. The club also reached the 2016 FFA Cup Final for the first time, losing to Melbourne City 1–0, in a highly controversial match.

This did not affect the momentum however, with Arnold's men going 19 games unbeaten before losing to arch rivals Western Sydney Wanderers in the Sydney Derby. Despite this setback, Sydney FC marched on yet again, winning the Premier's Plate with four games to spare and breaking numerous A-League records, including: most competition points, most wins in a season, fewest goals conceded, most clean sheets and best goal difference. Marquee striker Bobô ended the regular season as top scorer with 15 goals, narrowly missing Marc Janko's record of 16. The club qualified for the 2018 AFC Champions League after finishing first, which was their fourth Asian Champions League campaign.

They finished the season as double winners – winning the 2017 A-League Grand Final 4–2 (1–1 AET) on penalties against Melbourne Victory at their former home ground, Allianz Stadium. The winning penalty was scored by Johnny Warren Medallist Miloš Ninković who re-signed for a following year the next day, before also being named player of the year at the club's awards night.

The Sky Blues went on a successful FFA Cup run in 2017, starting with an 8–0 thumping of Northern Territory amateur side Darwin Rovers, with Bobô scoring a club record equalling 4 goals in the match. The following round they played NPL2 side Canterbury Bankstown, winning 3–0 in a fairly scrappy match, with goals from Carney, Bobô, and a debut goal from new signing Adrian Mierzejewski in injury time to put them through to the quarter finals. Sydney drew Melbourne City, marking the third battle between the two in the cup. An early goal from Jordy Buijs put Sydney up 1–0, before a second half goal from captain Alex Brosque sealed the win at Leichhardt Oval. In the semi-finals, they faced yet another Melbourne side, with a trip to Lakeside Stadium to play South Melbourne booked. The Sky Blues ran out 5–1 winners, with a brace from Bobô sealing their date with destiny in the 2017 FFA Cup Final to play Adelaide United. The final was played at Sydney Football Stadium, only the second time it had hosted an FFA Cup match. The Harbour City Originals opened the scoring on 20 minutes, as Milos Ninkovic latched onto a through ball, before sliding past a defender and poking a shot past goalkeeper Paul Izzo. The slender one-goal lead only had them in front until an equaliser by Nikola Mileusnic got Adelaide back into the game. The game was forced into extra time, before Bobô scored a header on 111 minutes to win the FFA Cup for Sydney FC.

The 2017—18 season proved to be successful after the FFA Cup win, with the Sky Blues becoming the first ever club to win back-to-back premierships in the A-League era, and the first in Australian national league history since Melbourne Knights.

With Graham Arnold being chosen to take over the Australian national team coaching role after the 2018 World Cup, his time at the club ended when his team were defeated 3–2 by Melbourne Victory, after extra time in a semi-final of the 2018 A-League finals series.

=== 2018–2023: Corica era - The continued dynasty, relocation and return to the Allianz ===
Steve Corica became the ninth permanent head coach of Sydney FC when his appointment was officially announced on 16 May 2018. Corica's appointment would be a continuation of his thirteen years of involvement with the club, starting off as one of the club's first player signings in the inaugural 2005-06 season. Following the end of his playing career in Sydney FC in 2010, Corica took on various managerial roles in the club as assistant coach, youth team coach as well as a short stint as interim manager in 2012.

Corica was tasked with rebuilding a Sydney FC coming off the most successful era of their history. A major overhaul of the squad was needed with the retirements of former Socceroos Luke Wilkshire and David Carney and key players Matt Simon Dutch defender Jordy Buijs leaving the club. Johnny Warren Medalist Adrian Mierzejewski and Golden Boot winner, Bobô would also conclude their tenures at Sydney FC.

Corica first re-signed defensive stalwart Alex Wilkinson followed by captain and club legend Alex Brosque.. He would follow this up with the signings of former English Premier League star Adam Le Fondre and Dutch attacking midfielder Siem de Jong on loan from Ajax.

This was the first season Sydney FC would play away from their spiritual home ground, Allianz Stadium, due to renovations. The team would play their home matches at Jubilee Stadium, Leichhardt Oval and the Sydney Cricket Ground until the 2022-23 season.

The 2018–19 season was a successful campaign for Sydney FC, as they finished second in the regular season with 52 points, eight points behind premiers Perth Glory. In the 2018 FFA Cup, Sydney FC reached the final for the third consecutive year. The Sky Blues faced Adelaide United FC in the final for the second consecutive season. Sydney FC would be defeated at Hindmarsh Stadium 2–1 in the final after a brace from Adelaide's Craig Goodwin.

In the finals series, Sydney FC thrashed rivals Melbourne Victory 6–1 in the semi-finals, thanks to goals from Aaron Calver, Alex Brosque, an own goal from Leigh Broxham, Adam Le Fondre and Miloš Ninković equalling the record for the largest margin of victory in The Big Blue. Sydney then travelled to Perth for the 2019 Grand Final, defeating Perth Glory in the grand final after a dramatic penalty shootout, which ended 4–1 with January signing Reza Ghoochannejhad scoring the decisive penalty and Andrew Redmayne saving two penalties.

The 2018–19 season marked successful transition periods with Steve Corica's first season in charge and the team's first season away from Allianz Stadium. They finished in the top two in all domestic competitions.

Contrasting their domestic form, Sydney FC continental showings in the 2019 AFC Champions League was disappointing. The club failed to progress from the group stage, finishing at the bottom of their group with just three points from six matches.

The 2019-20 season would again bear silverware for Corica and Sydney FC despite the disruptions caused by the COVID-19 pandemic in Australia and New Zealand and the retirement of club legend Alex Brosque. Defender Alex Wilkinson would assume the team's captaincy following Brosque's retirement. In a show of the club's intent, Sydney FC poached a duo of star players directly from their two major rivals - Melbourne Victory's Kosta Barbarouses and Western Sydney Wanderers FC playmaker Alexander Baumjohann. Sydney FC would also secure the signing of Melbourne City FC midfielder Luke Brattan and Australian international defender Ryan McGowan.

Corica would lead Sydney FC to a historic double, losing only 5 games all season. Sydney FC would win the league by six points ahead of Melbourne City FC. They would also claim the championship defeating Melbourne City FC 1-0 with Rhyan Grant once again scoring the key goal in the grand final, as he did in 2017.

2020-21 would see Sydney FC compete for honours yet again, however, would mark the first season for Corica where the club would not win any silverware. Even with the return of legendary goal scorer Bobô, the club would finish runners-up in both the premiership and championship to Melbourne City FC.

On 7 April 2021, Sydney FC became the first A-League club to record 200 wins with a 1–0 win over Perth Glory.

2021-2022 would be Corica's least successful full season with the club. Sydney FC would finish 8th, equalling their worst league performance in 2010-11 season as well as failing to qualify for the A-League finals series.

Sydney FC moved into their rebuilt Sydney Football Stadium in Moore Park for the 2022–23 season. A fruitful off-season brought about key signings of Nottingham Forrest's Joe Lolley, Slovak international Robert Mak and former England international defender Jack Rodwell. The off-season was not without drama however as long time player Miloš Ninković made the controversial move to rivals Western Sydney Wanderers after a much publicised contract negotiation saga.

In an improved showing Sydney FC finished 5th that season, qualifying for the 2023 A-League Finals Series. In a twist of irony after Ninkovic's move to their rivals, Sydney FC would face Western Sydney Wanderers in a Sydney Derby Elimination Final. Corica and Sydney FC would travel to Wanderers' Western Sydney Stadium and end their season in their home ground with a 2-1 victory . In the Semi-Final Sydney FC managed a 1–1 draw at home in the first leg of the semi final against Melbourne City, but were comprehensively beaten 4–0 in the second leg at AAMI Park in Melbourne.

The 2023–24 season started with success for Sydney FC, winning the 2023 Australia Cup with a 3–1 victory over Brisbane Roar in the final at home. However, a poor start to the A-League season which saw Sydney FC lose their first three matches without registering a goal, and languishing on the bottom of the table, saw Corica resign as Sydney FC coach only 3 weeks after lifting the Australia Cup.

=== 2023–2026: Ufuk Talay's tenure ===
The day after the mutual resignation of Steve Corica, Sydney FC appointed another former player as their new head coach, Ufuk Talay.

Talay's first season with Sydney FC started with a shock 5-1 away win against Adelaide United. Talay's Sydney FC would finish the regular season in fourth place with their high tempo, gegenpressing approach. Head Coach Talay and his assistant David Zdrilic would earn plaudits for Sydney FC's entertaining displays - by the conclusion of the season they would be the A-League's equal most prolific team scoring 52 goals. In the 2024 A-League Finals Series Talay would lead his team to a 4-0 win against Macarthur FC in the Elimination Final but would fall short to eventual Champions Central Coast Mariners FC, losing 2-1 on aggregate across 2 legs. This season would also mark the end of captain Luke Brattan's 5 year tenure with the Sky Blues.

On 20 June 2024, AFC confirmed that Sydney FC will participate in the 2024–25 AFC Champions League Two marking their first appearance in the competition.

The 2024-25 A-League season would start with great optimism for Talay and Sydney FC. Former FC Bayern Munich and Juventus FC winger Douglas Costa headlined an enssemble cast of attacking signings which included Moroccan U23 representative Anas Ouahim, Polish striker Patryk Klimala and ex-Spezia Calcia midfielder Léo Sena.

Despite the squad's quality, Sydney FC struggled for consistency in the regular season. By the end of the regular season, Sydney FC would finish 7th and fail to qualify for the 2025 A-League Men finals series. In a rare highlight for the season, Sydney FC academy player Adrian Segečić would have a break-out season scoring 13 goals and sharing the honour of the A-League Men Golden Boot with Archie Goodwin.

Conversely, as Australian representatives in the 2024–25 AFC Champions League Two Sydney FC excelled. Talay's Sydney FC would finish second in their group, just two points shy of Japanese giants Sanfrecce Hiroshima. In the knock-out stage, Sydney FC would defeat Thai FA Cup champions Bangkok United FC in a dramatic two-legged tie. Talisman Douglas Costa scored the winning goal deep in extra time, breaking a 31 game winning streak at home for Bangkok United FC. Progressing to the Quarter-finals, Sydney FC faced South Korea's Jeonbuk Hyundai Motors. Talay guided Sydney FC to a convincing 5-2 aggregate win across the two legs.

Sydney FC were due to face their group stage rivals Sanfrecce Hiroshima in the Semi-finals yet due to an administrative abnormality, the Japanese team were removed from the 2024–25 AFC Champions League Two by ruling of the Asian Football Confederation. Sydney FC would face Singapore Football League outfit Lion City Sailors FC. In a shock result, Sydney FC would be knocked out by Lion City Sailors FC, denying the Sky Blues a historic opportunity for a home continental final and title.

A combination of the poor A-League season, failure to qualify for the A-League finals series and surprise semi-final elimination in the 2024–25 AFC Champions League Two would heap heavy pressure on coach Ufuk Talay. In an unexpected move, Sydney FC would extend Talay's contract into the 2025-26 A-League Season. Due to personal issues in the off-season, star player Douglas Costa would leave the Sky Blues. Club stalwarts Andrew Redmayne and Anthony Caceres would also depart Sydney FC while break-out youngster Adrian Segečić would secure a move to EFL Championship team Portsmouth FC.

Talay's Sydney FC would start the 2025-26 A-League Season as one of the league's front runners and would set the pace as league leaders from November to December 2025. A rejuvenated Sky Blues headlined by signings of Peru international Piero Quispe, defender Marcel Tisserand, Young Socceroo talent Paul Okon-Engstler and former Western United FC captain Ben Garuccio would challenge for the regular season premiership for much of the year. A significant slump in performances however would lead to the termination of Ufuk Talay's tenure as manager of Sydney FC on 24 March 2026.

=== 2026: The Arrival of Patrick Kisnorbo ===
Former A-League Premier and Championship winning coach Patrick Kisnorbo was announced as interim manager of Sydney FC on 24 March 2026 after the departure of Ufuk Talay. With the Sky Blues precariously close to failing to qualify for the A-League final series, Kisnorbo would finish the final four league games undefeated leading Sydney FC to a fifth place finish.

In the 2026 A-League Men finals series, Kisnorbo led Sydney FC to victories against rivals Melbourne Victory FC and league premiers Newcastle Jets FC in the elimination final and semi final respectively. Sydney FC advanced to their eighth A-League grand final appearance, their first since 2021. Sydney FC were defeated by Auckland FC 1-0 at Go Media Stadium.

Patrick Kisnorbo was announced as Sydney FC manager on a permanent basis on 19 May 2026.

== Colours and badge ==
Original logo. From 2004 to 2017

The primary club colour of Sydney FC is sky blue, which represents the state colour of New South Wales. The secondary club colour is navy blue, with additional contrasting colours of orange and white, however the colour orange does not feature in the club's 2017 redesign of the crest.

The current Sydney FC badge was released on 17 May 2017 and is a reworking of a design by Liam Johnson on behalf of and submitted by the club's supporter group, The Cove. The crest features the Sydney Opera House in white pictured in front of a sky-blue backdrop on top of a navy blue base featuring the Commonwealth Star. The Opera House represents an iconic landmark of Sydney, the sky-blue represents the club's primary colour and the state colour of New South Wales, and the Commonwealth Star, also found on the Australian flag, is a symbol representing the Federation of Australia.

The initial Sydney FC badge was created and used since the club's founding in 2004. It featured a soccer ball set centrally in a stylised crest shape. Above the ball was the shape of three shells of the Sydney Opera House, and below that was the Commonwealth Star.

There is a silver star atop the badge with the numeral five written inside it, representing the number of championships the club has won.

== Stadiums ==
Sydney FC plays its home matches at the newly constructed Sydney Football Stadium. The team moved into the stadium for the 2022–23 A-League Men season. Their first match at the stadium was against the club's fierce rivals, Melbourne Victory on 8 October 2022 in front of 21,840 supporters. Sydney lost the match 2–3.

The home ground was built as a replacement for the original Sydney Football Stadium. This stadium was built in 1988 to be the premium "rectangular field" for rugby league matches. It was also used for soccer and rugby union for major matches and domestic competition. The stadium was then demolished in 2019 to be rebuilt into a boutique, world class venue. It had been the venue for Australian international matches (notably World Cup Qualifier against Argentina in 1993). The stadium's capacity was stated at 41,159 prior to renovations in 2007, although the attendance of the 2006 A-League grand final exceeded this number by over 500. The stated capacity prior to demolition was 45,500. Sydney FC's final game at the stadium was a 2–3 extra time loss to Melbourne Victory in the 2017–18 A-League Semifinal.

Prior to the current season, for four years whilst the new stadium was being built between the 2018–19 and 2021–22 seasons, Sydney played its home games out of two stadiums, Leichhardt Oval and Jubilee Oval. The Sydney Cricket Ground located in Moore Park was used in its first season of this redevelopment period. With a capacity of 46,000, it was used for the club's major fixtures during their time away from their traditional home, although this was eventually abandoned until the Sydney Derby on 23 May 2021.

Sydney FC have played matches at other Sydney venues. Parramatta Stadium in western Sydney was the venue for an AFC Champions League match against Indonesian football side Persik Kediri in April 2007 when the SFS was unavailable due to an NRL match being played there. A friendly match against Los Angeles Galaxy was played at ANZ Stadium in November 2007 due to its greater capacity, and drew a crowd of 80,295. The club has also played regular season games there against Perth Glory in 2012, and Newcastle Jets and Melbourne City in 2016. Sydney played one home game at WIN Stadium in Wollongong on 3 January 2015 against Newcastle Jets. They also played at Campbelltown Stadium against Perth Glory in the 2011–12 A-League season.

On 17 May 2017, the club and Sydney Cricket Ground Trust agreed to a ten-year extension of the lease.

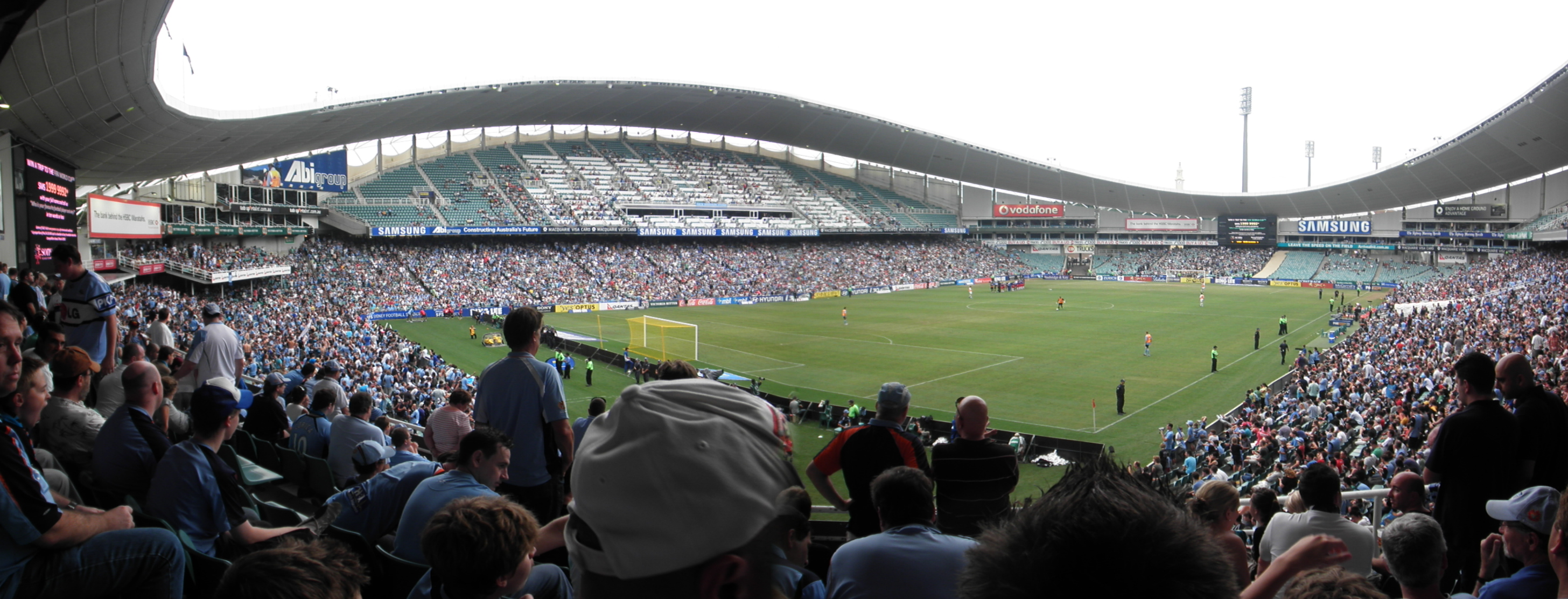
Allianz Stadium prior to Sydney FC defeating Melbourne Victory 2–0 to win the 2009–10 Hyundai A-League Premiership in front of 25,407 fans

=== Club facilities ===
Sydney FC's training ground and club headquarters is the Sydney FC Centre of Excellence, commonly referred to as Sky Park. It is located in the suburb of North Ryde about 20km north-west of Allianz Stadium. Sky Park hosts Sydney FC's training and administrative operations for its men's, women's and academy departments.

== Sponsorship ==
Period	Kit Manufacturer	Shirt Sponsor	Minor Sponsor
2005–2007	Reebok	Healthe	HBA Insurance
2007–2009	Reebok	Bing Lee / JVC	HBA Insurance
2009–2011	Reebok	Bing Lee / Sony	MBF Health Insurance Pulsar
2011–2012	Adidas	Unicef	Sydney Children's Hospital / CMRI
2012–2014	Adidas	Webjet	Destination NSW / Caltex
2014–2015	Adidas	Webjet	StarTrack / Beechwood
2015–2017	Puma	Webjet	StarTrack; ITP; University of New South Wales
2017–2019	Puma	The Star	StarTrack; ITP; University of New South Wales
2019–2023	Under Armour	The Star	Kennards Hire
2023–	Under Armour	Macquarie University	Kennards Hire

=== AFC Competition Sponsorship ===
Year	Kit Manufacturer	Shirt Sponsor
2007	Reebok	No sponsor
2011	Reebok	events-sydney.com
2016	Puma	StarTrack
2018	Puma	AETOS Capital Group
2019	Puma	AETOS Capital Group
2020	Under Armour	AETOS Capital Group
2022	Under Armour	MA Financial Group
2024–25	Under Armour	Macquarie University

== Supporters ==
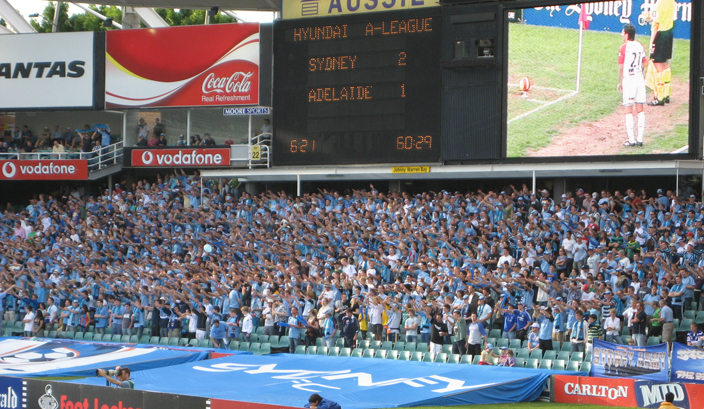
Sydney supporters at the northern end of Allianz Stadium

Sydney FC is the most supported A-League club in Australia. As of 2025, a total of 686,000 Australians indicated that Sydney FC was the team in the A-League which they supported.

Sydney FC draws support from across all of Metropolitan and Suburban Greater Sydney. The main supporter group of Sydney FC is known as The Cove, and occupy Bay 23 at the Allianz Stadium during home games. The group's name was inspired by the historical name of the Circular Quay area, the Sydney Cove, and was decided by the inaugural members of the supporter group in May 2005.

The Cove show their support for Sydney FC through chants, songs and choreography displays. Signature club songs include We Are Sydney and Forza Sydney FC.

On 7 July 2006, Australian rock singer Jimmy Barnes recorded a club song entitled 'Sydney FC for Me' with 25 members of The Cove singing back-up vocals. It was released prior to the start of the 2006–07 season.

The Cove was directly involved the creation of the modern Sydney FC badge, with them putting forward designs and ideas which carried over to the finished product.

== Rivalries ==
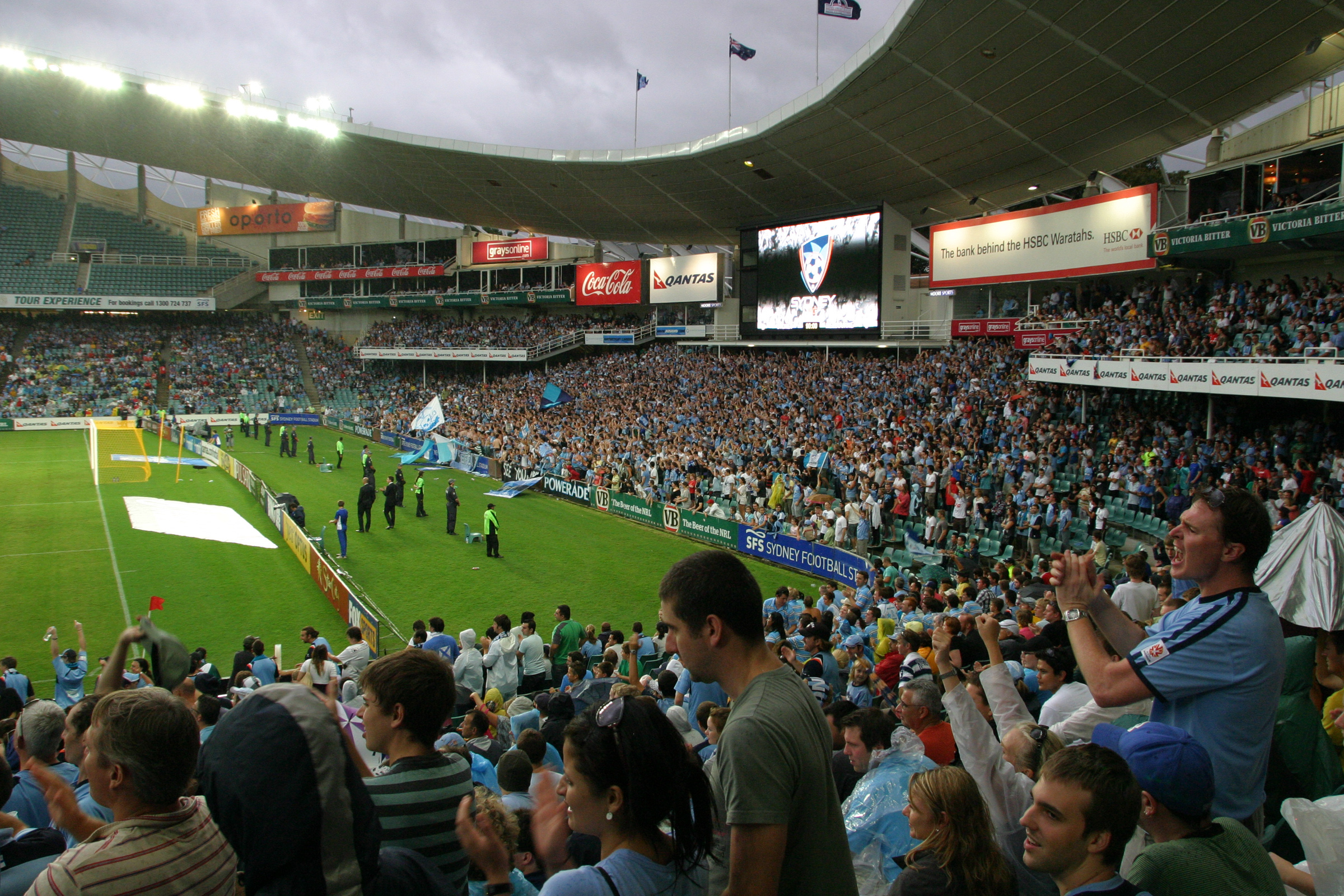
Sydney supporters during a match against Melbourne Victory

- Melbourne Victory – The Big Blue – The Big Blue is most historic rivalry in A-League. The Sydney FC-Melbourne Victory rivalry stems from the clubs being the two biggest and most successful teams in the league with storylines originating from the inception of the A-League. Sydney and Melbourne have been rivals on many fronts, beyond football and sport, for over a century.
- Western Sydney Wanderers – The Sydney Derby – Sydney FC contests the Sydney Derby with local rivals Western Sydney Wanderers FC. A rivalry fueled by the geographical and cultural divide between these teams, the Sydney Derby is considered one of the A-League's marquee fixtures due to this genuine disdain. Recent history has seen a marked dominance of the fixture by Sydney FC.

== Statistics and records ==
Rhyan Grant holds the record for Sydney FC appearances, having played 415 first-team matches between 2008 and 2026. The record for a goalkeeper is held by Andrew Redmayne, with 238 appearances.

The club's all-time top goalscorer in all competitions is Alex Brosque with 83 goals. Adam Le Fondre has scored the second most goals with 73 goals whilst in third is Bobô with 71 goals.

Sydney FC's highest home attendance for a league match was 41,213, recorded on 18 October 2014 at the Sydney Football Stadium against the Western Sydney Wanderers in the Sydney Derby. The highest home attendance in any fixture is 80,295 recorded on 27 November 2007 for a friendly match against LA Galaxy at Stadium Australia.

=== Win–loss record ===
- This list only contains teams currently in the A-League.

Opponent	Played	Won	Drawn	Lost	Win %
Perth Glory	60	36	14	10	60.00
Newcastle Jets	57	33	13	11	57.90
Wellington Phoenix	51	27	8	16	52.94
Central Coast Mariners	62	32	12	18	51.61
Western Sydney Wanderers	42	20	10	12	47.62
Western United	15	7	3	5	46.67
Macarthur FC	13	6	1	6	46.15
Adelaide United	67	29	13	25	43.28
Melbourne City	47	17	12	18	36.17
Melbourne Victory	66	26	19	21	39.39
Brisbane Roar	64	23	19	22	35.94
Auckland FC	2	0	1	1	0.00

== Players ==
=== First-team squad ===
As of 17 September 2026

Note: Flags indicate national team as defined under FIFA eligibility rules; some limited exceptions apply. Players may hold more than one non-FIFA nationality.

No.	Pos.	Nation	Player
1	GK	AUS	Gus Hoefsloot
2	DF	AUS	James Overy
4	DF	AUS	Jordan Courtney-Perkins
5	DF	AUS	Jacob Farrell (on loan from Portsmouth)
7	FW	AUS	Akol Akon (on loan from Colorado Rapids)
8	MF	AUS	Wataru Kamijo
9	FW	NGR	Oriola Sunday (on loan from RB Omiya Ardija)
11	FW	AUS	Abel Walatee
12	GK	AUS	Harrison Devenish-Meares
14	FW	JPN	Takahiro Sekine
15	MF	AUS	Jake Hollman
16	FW	AUS	Gabriel Popovic
17	DF	AUS	Ben Garuccio
18	FW	AUS	Zach Harrison

No.	Pos.	Nation	Player
20	FW	AUS	Tiago Quintal
22	FW	AUS	Mathias Macallister
23	DF	AUS	Rhyan Grant (captain)
26	MF	AUS	Nick Alfaro (scholarship)
28	DF	NZL	Ethan Dyer
29	MF	WAL	Joe Lacey
30	GK	AUS	Alexander Zaverdinos
32	DF	COD	Marcel Tisserand
33	MF	AUS	Marin France
34	DF	AUS	Tyler Williams (scholarship)
35	FW	AUS	Al Hassan Touré
36	MF	AUS	Rhys Youlley
41	DF	AUS	Alexandar Popovic
—	FW	ESP	Víctor Campuzano

=== Youth ===
Players to have been featured in a first-team matchday squad for Sydney FC

Note: Flags indicate national team as defined under FIFA eligibility rules; some limited exceptions apply. Players may hold more than one non-FIFA nationality.

No.	Pos.	Nation	Player
2	DF	AUS	Nicolas Zdrilic
31	DF	AUS	Jared Middleton

No.	Pos.	Nation	Player
38	MF	AUS	Sam Lancaster

=== Out on loan ===
Note: Flags indicate national team as defined under FIFA eligibility rules; some limited exceptions apply. Players may hold more than one non-FIFA nationality.

No.	Pos.	Nation	Player
3	DF	AUS	Aaron Gurd (on loan at Sydney Olympic until end of 2026 Australian Championship)
19	FW	AUS	Mitchell Glasson (on loan at Marconi Stallions until end of 2026 Australian Championship)
21	DF	AUS	Zac De Jesus (on loan at Wollongong Wolves until end of 2026 Australian Championship)

=== Club captains ===
Named club captains for the season only. Does not include acting captains when club captain was unavailable or not selected.

Name	Nat	Period
Mark Rudan	(Australia)	2005–07
Tony Popovic	(Australia)	2007–08
Steve Corica	(Australia)	2008–10
Terry McFlynn	(Northern Ireland)	2010–13
Alessandro Del Piero	(Italy)	2013–14
Alex Brosque	(Australia)	2014–19
Alex Wilkinson	(Australia)	2019–23
Luke Brattan	(Australia)	2023–24
Rhyan Grant	(Australia)	2024–

== Academy and Youth Systems ==
Before the establishment of the academy, the original Sydney FC youth team was a collection of club representatives under the age of 21 who were signed to represent the club in the then National Youth League.

Established in 2009, Sydney FC has developed a multi-level academy program to nurture playing, coaching and sporting professional talent with the goal of integration into the first team. Sydney FC works with association and scouting partners to identify talent for its academy programs. Based out of Sky Park, the Sydney FC Academy participates in Football NSW Boys’ Youth League One at Under 13s, Under 14s, Under 15s and Under 16s levels. The Sydney FC senior academy team participates in the National Premier Leagues NSW set up.

The Sydney FC Academy is widely recognized as one of Australia's premier youth development systems with many of its academy graduates progressing to playing professional first team football for Sydney FC as well as other teams in Australia and around the world. Many also have represented Australia's (and other nations) national teams at youth and senior levels.

The following is a list of Sydney FC Academy graduates and Sydney FC National Youth League alumni who have represented a men's national team at full senior international level. Players in bold are currently playing at Sydney FC.

Australia

- (Australia) John Iredale
- (Australia) Cameron Devlin
- (Australia) Joel King
- (Australia) Marco Tilio
- (Australia) Ryan Teague
- (Australia) Patrick Yazbek
- (Australia) Hayden Matthews
- (Australia) Cristian Volpato
- (Australia) Dimitri Petratos
- (Australia) **Rhyan Grant**
- (Australia) Matt Jurman

Greece

- (Greece) Nectarios Triantis

Malaysia

- (Malaysia) Brendan Gan

Philippines

- (Philippines) Iain Ramsay

== Non-playing staff ==
=== Coaching staff ===
Position	Name
Head coach	(Australia) Patrick Kisnorbo
Assistant Coach	(Australia) Matt Sim
Goalkeeping coach	(Australia) Matthew Nash
Head of Sports Science & Performance	(Australia) Alex Scardino
Head Physiotherapist	(Australia) Josh Weight
Physiotherapist	(Australia) Joshua Wilde
Head of Football Analysis	(Australia) Justin McMahon
Video Analyst	(Australia) Riki Totsukawa

=== Corporate hierarchy ===
Position	Name
Chairman	Jan Voss
Executive Vice Chairman	Sebastian Gray
Director and owner	Alina Barlow
Director	Han Berger
Director	Walter Bugno
Director	Michael Crismale
Director	Peter Paradise
Chief Executive Officer	Vacant
Head of Player Management	Alex Baumjohann
Head of Football Operations	Alex Wilkinson

=== Managerial history ===
The current manager of Sydney FC is Patrick Kisnorbo.

Former player, captain and club Hall of Famer, Steve Corica, is Sydney FC's longest serving manager with a 180 game tenure spanning across 2018 to 2023 where he led the club to an A-League Premiership, 2 A-League Championships and an Australia Cup.

Graham Arnold is widely considered to be the most successful Sydney FC manager of all time. Arnold managed the club from 2014 to 2018, securing 2 A-League Premierships, an A-League Championship and an FFA Cup. His 2016-17 team holds the record for the most points in an A-League season (66), least home defeats in a season (0) and least defeats in a season (1). His 2016-17 and 2017-18 teams also holds the record for most home wins in a season (10).

There have been eleven permanent and one caretaker manager of Sydney FC since the appointment of their first manager, Pierre Littbarski in 2005.

=== Chairmen history ===
Chairman	Years
Walter Bugno	2005–2006
Edmund Capon	2006–2007
Andrew Kemeny	2007–2009
Paul Ramsay	2009–2012
Scott Barlow	2012–2025
Jan Voss	2025–

== Club awards ==
=== Hall of Fame ===
On 16 March 2015, Sydney FC inducted eight members into its inaugural Hall of Fame at the club's 10-year anniversary lunch. Additional inductees are added to the hall of fame at the annual end of season Sky Blue Ball.

Name	Role	Date Inducted
(Australia) Steve Corica	Foundation player (2005–2010) and captain (2008–2010)	16 March 2015
(Trinidad and Tobago) Dwight Yorke	Inaugural Marquee player (2005–2006)	16 March 2015
(Australia) Mark Rudan	Inaugural captain (2005–2008)	16 March 2015
(Australia) Clint Bolton	Foundation player (goalkeeper), 142 appearances (2005–2010)	16 March 2015
(Northern Ireland) Terry McFlynn	Foundation player, captain (2010–2013), all-time leading appearances (214) across 9 seasons (2005–2014)	16 March 2015
(Italy) Alessandro Del Piero	International Marquee player (2012–2014), captain (2013–14)	16 March 2015
(Germany) Pierre Littbarski	Inaugural coach (2005–2006), honours — OFC Club Championship (2005) and A-League Championship (2006)	16 March 2015
(Czech Republic) Vítězslav Lavička	Coach (2009–2012), domestic double (A-League Premiership and Championship in 2010)	16 March 2015
(Australia) Alen Stajcic	W-League Coach (2008–2014), Premiers (2009, 2010–11) Champions (2009, 2013)	14 June 2016
(Australia) Alex Brosque	Captain (2014–2019); most successful – two premierships, two championships, one FFA Cup; Player (2006–2011, 2014–2019); most appearances (265) and goals (83), three consecutive Player of the Year awards (2007–2010)	3 June 2019
(Australia) Alex Wilkinson	Captain (2019–2023); Player (2016–2023); one Player of the Year award (2021)	9 June 2023
(Australia) Teresa Polias	Captain (2014–2021); Player (2010–2021); two premierships, two championships, three Player of the Year awards (2012, 2013, 2019); most A–League Women appearances (157)	9 June 2023

=== Team of the Decade ===
In April 2015, Sydney FC also announced its Team of the Decade at the annual end of season awards night, the Sky Blue Ball.

Substitutes: (Australia) Vedran Janjetovic, (South Korea) Byun Sung-Hwan, (Serbia) Milos Dimitrijevic, (Australia) Terry Antonis, (Trinidad and Tobago) Dwight Yorke
Coach: (Czech Republic) Vitezslav Lavicka

=== 20th Anniversary Team ===
On 4 June 2025, Sydney FC announced its 20th anniversary team which was voted by club members.

Substitutes: (Australia) Danny Vukovic, (Italy) Alessandro Del Piero, (Northern Ireland) Terry McFlynn, (England) Adam Le Fondre, (Australia) Steve Corica
Coach: (Australia) Graham Arnold

=== End of season awards ===
Year	Player of the Season (Note: Men's: From seasons ending in 2006 to 2012, the Player of the Year was voted by the A-League playing squad. There was also a member's award.; From seasons ending in 2013 to 2017, the Player of the Year was voted by the coaching and administration staff. The member's player of the year continued and a separate award was given to the player's player of the year.; From seasons ending in 2018 on-wards, the Player of the Year was voted by a select panel of football and coaching staff. The member's award continued and the player's player of the year was replaced by the rising star award (Sydney FC Academy Player of the Year).)	Member's	U-20's (Note: Youth: From seasons ending in 2012 to 2019, the Youth award was voted by the Youth League playing squad for the A-League Youth competition. Since the cancellation of this tournament, the award has been given the best U-20 player from the senior squad)	Player's Player / Rising Star (Note: From seasons ending in 2006 to 2012, the Player's Player award was given to the official Sydney FC player of the year. From seasons ending in 2013 to 2017, the Player's Player of the Year was then given as a separate award. This was replaced in 2018 by the Rising Star – an award given to the Academy player of the year. From 2026 The Player's Player of the Year was reintroduced - designated by ^{PP}; The Rising Star award continued - designated by ^{RS})	Ref
2006	(Australia) Clint Bolton	—N/a	—N/a	—N/a	
2007	(Australia) Robbie Middleby	—N/a	—N/a	—N/a	
2008	(Australia) Alex Brosque	—N/a	—N/a	—N/a	
2009	(Australia) Alex Brosque (2)	—N/a	—N/a	—N/a	
2010	(Australia) Alex Brosque (3)	—N/a	—N/a	—N/a	
2011	unknown or not awarded	—N/a	—N/a	—N/a	
2012	(Australia) Ivan Necevski	(Australia) Nick Carle	(Australia) Hagi Gligor	—N/a	
2013	(Italy) Alessandro Del Piero	(Italy) Alessandro Del Piero	(Australia) Peter Triantis	(Australia) Rhyan Grant	
2014	(Serbia) Nikola Petković	(Iraq) Ali Abbas	(Australia) Christopher Naumoff	(Iraq) Ali Abbas	
2015	(Serbia) Miloš Dimitrijević	(Serbia) Miloš Dimitrijević	(Australia) George Blackwood	(Serbia) Miloš Dimitrijević	
2016	(Australia) Matthew Jurman	(Australia) Matthew Jurman	(Australia) Daniel Araujo	(Australia) Matthew Jurman	
2017	(Serbia) Miloš Ninković	(Serbia) Miloš Ninković	(Australia) Andrea Agamemnonos	(Serbia) Miloš Ninković	
2018	(Brazil) Bobô	(Poland) Adrian Mierzejewski	(Australia) Jeremy Cox	(Australia) Marco Tilio	
2019	(Australia) Brandon O'Neill	(Australia) Rhyan Grant	(Australia) Luke Ivanovic	(Australia) Ryan Teague	
2020	(Australia) Luke Brattan	(Australia) Andrew Redmayne	(Australia) Joel King	(Australia) Adam Pavlesic	
2021	(Australia) Alex Wilkinson	(Serbia) Miloš Ninković (2)	(Australia) Patrick Wood	(Australia) Adrian Segecic	
2022	(Australia) Anthony Caceres	(Australia) Anthony Caceres	(Australia) Patrick Yazbek	(Australia) Jake Girdwood-Reich	
2023	(Slovakia) Róbert Mak	(Australia) Max Burgess	(Australia) Patrick Wood (2)	(Australia) Mitchell Glasson	
2024	(England) Joe Lolley	(England) Joe Lolley	(Australia) Corey Hollman	(Australia) Marin France	
2025	(Australia) Adrian Segecic	(Australia) Adrian Segecic	(Australia) Wataru Kamijo	(Australia) Mathias Macallister	
2026	(Australia) Paul Okon-Engstler	(Australia) Harrison Devenish-Meares	(Australia) Tiago Quintal	(Australia) Harrison Devenish-Meares^{PP} (Australia) Akol Akon^{RS}	

== Honours ==
=== Domestic ===
Chart of yearly table positions for Sydney FC in A-League Men

- A-League Men Championship
  - Winners (5) : 2006, 2010, 2017, 2019, 2020 (record)
  - Runners-up (3): 2015, 2021, 2026
- A-League Men Premiership
  - Winners (4) : 2009–10, 2016–17, 2017–18, 2019–20 (record)
  - Runners-up (4): 2005–06, 2014–15, 2018–19, 2020–21
- Australia Cup
  - Winners (2): 2017, 2023
  - Runners-up (2): 2016, 2018
- Australian Club World Championship Qualifying Tournament
  - Winners (1): 2005

=== Continental ===
- OFC Champions League
  - Winners (1): 2005

== International record ==
Season	Competition	Round	Club	Home	Away	Aggregate
2005	OFC Club Championship	Group A	(New Zealand) Auckland City	3–2		1st out of 4
2005	OFC Club Championship	Group A	(Papua New Guinea) Sobou	9–2		1st out of 4
2005	OFC Club Championship	Group A	(French Polynesia) AS Pirae	6–1		1st out of 4
2005	OFC Club Championship	Semi-final	(Vanuatu) Tafea	6–0		
2005	OFC Club Championship	Final	(New Caledonia) AS Magenta	2–0		
2005	FIFA Club World Championship	Quarter-final	(Costa Rica) Deportivo Saprissa	0–1		
2005	FIFA Club World Championship	Fifth place Playoff	(Egypt) Al Ahly	2–1		
2007	AFC Champions League	Group E	(China) Shanghai Shenhua	0–0	2–1	2nd out of 4
2007	AFC Champions League	Group E	(Japan) Urawa Red Diamonds	2–2	0–0	2nd out of 4
2007	AFC Champions League	Group E	(Indonesia) Persik Kediri	3–0	1–2	2nd out of 4
2011	AFC Champions League	Group H	(South Korea) Suwon Samsung Bluewings	0–0	1–3	3rd out of 4
2011	AFC Champions League	Group H	(China) Shanghai Shenhua	1–1	3–2	3rd out of 4
2011	AFC Champions League	Group H	(Japan) Kashima Antlers	0–3	1–2	3rd out of 4
2016	AFC Champions League	Group H	(Japan) Urawa Red Diamonds	0–0	0–2	1st out of 4
2016	AFC Champions League	Group H	(China) Guangzhou Evergrande	2–1	0–1	1st out of 4
2016	AFC Champions League	Group H	(South Korea) Pohang Steelers	1–0	1–0	1st out of 4
2016	AFC Champions League	Round of 16	(China) Shandong Luneng	2–2	1–1	3–3 (a)
2018	AFC Champions League	Group H	(South Korea) Suwon Samsung Bluewings	0–2	4–1	3rd out of 4
2018	AFC Champions League	Group H	(China) Shanghai Shenhua	0–0	2–2	3rd out of 4
2018	AFC Champions League	Group H	(Japan) Kashima Antlers	0–2	1–1	3rd out of 4
2019	AFC Champions League	Group H	(South Korea) Ulsan Hyundai	0–0	0–1	4th out of 4
2019	AFC Champions League	Group H	(China) Shanghai SIPG	3–3	2–2	4th out of 4
2019	AFC Champions League	Group H	(Japan) Kawasaki Frontale	0–4	0–1	4th out of 4
2020	AFC Champions League	Group H	(South Korea) Jeonbuk Hyundai Motors	2–2	1–0	4th out of 4
2020	AFC Champions League	Group H	(China) Shanghai SIPG	1–2	0–4	4th out of 4
2020	AFC Champions League	Group H	(Japan) Yokohama F. Marinos	1–1	0–4	4th out of 4
2022	AFC Champions League	Preliminary round	(Philippines) Kaya–Iloilo	5–0		
2022	AFC Champions League	Play-off round	(China) Changchun Yatai	w/o		
2022	AFC Champions League	Group H	(South Korea) Jeonbuk Hyundai Motors	2–3	0–0	4th out of 4
2022	AFC Champions League	Group H	(Vietnam) Hoang Anh Gia Lai	1–1	0–1	4th out of 4
2022	AFC Champions League	Group H	(Japan) Yokohama F. Marinos	0–1	0–3	4th out of 4
2024–25	AFC Champions League Two	Group E	(Hong Kong) Eastern	5–0	4–1	2nd out of 4
2024–25	AFC Champions League Two	Group E	(Philippines) Kaya–Iloilo	3–1	3–1	2nd out of 4
2024–25	AFC Champions League Two	Group E	(Japan) Sanfrecce Hiroshima	0–1	1–2	2nd out of 4
2024–25	AFC Champions League Two	Round of 16	(Thailand) Bangkok United	2–2	3–2 (a.e.t.)	5–4
2024–25	AFC Champions League Two	Quarter-finals	(South Korea) Jeonbuk Hyundai Motors	3–2	2–0	5–2
2024–25	AFC Champions League Two	Semi-finals	(Singapore) Lion City Sailors	1–0	0–2	1–2

== See also ==
- List of Sydney FC seasons
- Sydney FC in international competition
- Sydney FC (women)

Preceded by None	A-League Champions; 2005–06 (First title)	Succeeded by Melbourne Victory
Preceded by Melbourne Victory	A-League Premiers; 2009–10 (First title)	Succeeded by Brisbane Roar
Preceded by Melbourne Victory	A-League Champions; 2009–10 (Second title)	Succeeded by Brisbane Roar
Preceded by Adelaide United	A-League Premiers; 2016–17 (Second title)	Succeeded by Sydney FC
Preceded by Adelaide United	A-League Champions; 2016–17 (Third title)	Succeeded by Melbourne Victory
Preceded by Sydney FC	A-League Premiers; 2017–18 (Third title)	Succeeded by Perth Glory
Preceded by Melbourne Victory	A-League Champions; 2018–19 (Fourth title)	Succeeded by Sydney FC
Preceded by Perth Glory	A-League Premiers; 2019–20 (Fourth title)	Succeeded by Melbourne City
Preceded by Sydney FC	A-League Champions; 2019–20 (Fifth title)	Succeeded by Melbourne City
