= 2015–16 Melbourne Victory FC season =

Melbourne Victory
2015–16 season
- Chairman: Anthony Di Pietro
- Manager: Kevin Muscat
- Stadium: AAMI Park, Melbourne
- A-League: 6th
- A-League Finals Series: Elimination-finals
- FFA Cup: Champions
- AFC Champions League: Round of 16
- Top goalscorer: League: Besart Berisha (17 goals); All: Besart Berisha (27 goals)
- Highest home attendance: 40,217 vs Melbourne City (17 October 2015)
- Lowest home attendance: 14,383 vs Newcastle Jets (20 March 2016)
- Average home league attendance: 23,112
Home colours	Away colours

The 2015–16 Melbourne Victory FC season was the club's 11th season since its establishment in 2004. The club participated in the A-League for the 11th time, the FFA Cup for the second time, as well as the AFC Champions League for the fifth time.

== Players ==
=== First-team squad ===
As of 7 January 2016.

Note: Flags indicate national team as defined under FIFA eligibility rules; some limited exceptions apply. Players may hold more than one non-FIFA nationality.

No.	Pos.	Nation	Player
1	GK	AUS	Danny Vukovic
2	DF	AUS	Jason Geria
3	DF	AUS	Scott Galloway
4	DF	AUS	Nick Ansell
5	DF	MKD	Daniel Georgievski
6	MF	AUS	Leigh Broxham (vice-captain)
7	MF	BRA	Gui Finkler
8	FW	ALB	Besart Berisha
9	FW	NZL	Kosta Barbarouses
10	FW	AUS	Archie Thompson
11	FW	AUS	Connor Pain
13	MF	AUS	Oliver Bozanic

No.	Pos.	Nation	Player
14	FW	TUN	Fahid Ben Khalfallah
15	DF	AUS	Giancarlo Gallifuoco
16	MF	AUS	Rashid Mahazi
17	DF	FRA	Matthieu Delpierre
18	DF	AUS	Dylan Murnane
19	FW	AUS	George Howard
20	GK	AUS	Lawrence Thomas
21	MF	AUS	Carl Valeri (Captain)
22	MF	AUS	Jesse Makarounas
23	FW	AUS	Jai Ingham
24	DF	AUS	Thomas Deng
30	GK	AUS	Lucas Spinella

=== From youth squad ===
N	Pos.	Nat.	Name	Age	Notes
19	FW	(Australia)	George Howard	18	1 year senior contract
24	DF	(Australia)	Thomas Deng	18	2 year senior contract
30	GK	(Australia)	Lucas Spinella	18	2 year senior contract

=== Transfers in ===
No.	Pos.	Nat.	Name	Age	Moving from	Type	Transfer window	Ends	Transfer fee	Source
1	GK	(Australia)	Danny Vukovic	30	Perth Glory	Mutual termination	Pre-season	2018	Free	
13	MF	(Australia)	Oliver Bozanic	26	Free agent	Transfer	Pre-season	2018	Free	
15	DF	(Australia)	Giancarlo Gallifuoco	21	Swansea City (Wales)	Transfer	Pre-season	2016	Free	
23	FW	(Australia)	Jai Ingham	22	Hume City	Transfer	Round 14	2017	Free	

=== Transfers out ===
No.	Pos.	Nat.	Name	Age	Moving to	Type	Transfer window	Transfer fee	Source
1	GK	(Australia)	Nathan Coe	30	Free agent	Released	Pre-season		
13	FW	(Australia)	Andrew Nabbout	22	Free agent	Released	Pre-season		
26	MF	(Australia)	Jordan Brown	18	Free agent	Released	Pre-season		
5	MF	(Australia)	Mark Milligan	29	Baniyas SC (United Arab Emirates)	Transfer	Pre-season		

== Technical staff ==
Position	Name
Manager	(Australia) Kevin Muscat
Assistant manager	(Australia) Rado Vidošić
Goalkeeping coach	(Australia) Dean Anastasiadis
Youth Team Manager	(Wales) Darren Davies
Youth Team Assistant Manager	(Scotland) Grant Brebner
Youth Team Assistant Manager	(Australia) Brian Vanega
Youth Team Developmental Manager	(New Zealand) Vaughan Coveny
Strength & Conditioning Coach	(Australia) Anthony Crea
Physiotherapist	(Australia) Travis Maude

== Statistics ==
=== Squad statistics ===
N	Pos.	Nat.	Name	Total					A-League					FFA Cup					AFC Champions League
N	Pos.	Nat.	Name	Apps	Goals	Yellow card	Second yellow card	Red card	Apps	Goals	Yellow card	Second yellow card	Red card	Apps	Goals	Yellow card	Second yellow card	Red card	Apps	Goals	Yellow card	Second yellow card	Red card
1	GK	(Australia)	Danny Vukovic	30	0	0	0	0	23+0	0	0	0	0	4+0	0	0	0	0	3+0	0	0	0	0
2	DF	(Australia)	Jason Geria	30	1	7	1	0	17+1	0	6	1	0	3+1	1	0	0	0	7+1	0	1	0	0
3	DF	(Australia)	Scott Galloway	16	0	5	0	0	9+2	0	4	0	0	2+0	0	0	0	0	2+1	0	1	0	0
4	DF	(Australia)	Nick Ansell	14	1	0	0	0	4+3	0	0	0	0	0+0	0	0	0	0	7+0	1	0	0	0
5	DF	(North Macedonia)	Daniel Georgievski	34	1	12	0	0	19+4	0	10	0	0	4+0	1	0	0	0	7+0	0	2	0	0
6	MF	(Australia)	Leigh Broxham	38	0	5	1	0	25+0	0	3	1	0	5+0	0	1	0	0	8+0	0	1	0	0
7	MF	(Brazil)	Gui Finkler	29	5	6	0	0	26+0	4	6	0	0	3+0	1	0	0	0	0+0	0	0	0	0
8	FW	(Albania)	Besart Berisha	39	27	4	0	1	26+0	18	4	0	1	5+0	5	0	0	0	8+0	4	0	0	0
9	FW	(New Zealand)	Kosta Barbarouses	36	10	7	0	0	23+1	6	5	0	0	4+0	3	1	0	0	8+0	1	1	0	0
10	FW	(Australia)	Archie Thompson	23	2	1	0	0	2+11	1	0	0	0	1+1	0	0	0	0	8+0	1	1	0	0
11	FW	(Australia)	Connor Pain	19	1	3	0	0	1+11	0	3	0	0	2+1	1	0	0	0	0+4	0	0	0	0
13	MF	(Australia)	Oliver Bozanic	38	5	4	0	0	25+2	4	2	0	0	3+0	1	2	0	0	7+1	0	0	0	0
14	FW	(Tunisia)	Fahid Ben Khalfallah	31	6	6	0	1	26+0	5	4	0	1	3+2	1	2	0	0	0+0	0	0	0	0
15	DF	(Australia)	Giancarlo Gallifuoco	6	0	1	0	0	2+1	0	0	0	0	1+0	0	1	0	0	0+2	0	0	0	0
16	MF	(Australia)	Rashid Mahazi	31	0	11	0	0	16+7	0	10	0	0	1+3	0	0	0	0	2+2	0	1	0	0
17	DF	(France)	Matthieu Delpierre	38	0	8	0	0	26+0	0	6	0	0	4+0	0	0	0	0	8+0	0	2	0	0
18	DF	(Australia)	Dylan Murnane	13	0	0	0	0	8+3	0	0	0	0	2+0	0	0	0	0	0+0	0	0	0	0
19	FW	(Australia)	George Howard	15	2	1	0	0	2+8	1	0	0	0	0+2	1	0	0	0	0+3	0	1	0	0
20	GK	(Australia)	Lawrence Thomas	11	0	1	0	0	5+0	0	1	0	0	1+0	0	0	0	0	5+0	0	0	0	0
21	MF	(Australia)	Carl Valeri	14	0	2	1	0	5+2	0	1	0	0	3+0	0	0	1	0	4+0	0	1	0	0
22	MF	(Australia)	Jesse Makarounas	24	3	5	0	0	2+12	0	4	0	0	3+0	2	0	0	0	1+6	1	1	0	0
23	FW	(Australia)	Jai Ingham	11	1	5	0	0	3+4	0	2	0	0	0+0	0	0	0	0	3+1	1	3	0	0
23	MF	(Australia)	Kieran Dover	1	0	0	0	0	0+0	0	0	0	0	0+1	0	0	0	0	0+0	0	0	0	0
24	DF	(Australia)	Thomas Deng	17	0	2	0	0	10+3	0	2	0	0	2+1	0	0	0	0	0+1	0	0	0	0
30	GK	(Australia)	Lucas Spinella	0	0	0	0	0	0+0	0	0	0	0	0+0	0	0	0	0	0+0	0	0	0	0
32	MF	(Australia)	Stefan Nigro	3	0	1	0	0	3+0	0	1	0	0	0+0	0	0	0	0	0+0	0	0	0	0
33	FW	(Australia)	Joey Katebian	2	0	0	0	0	0+1	0	0	0	0	0+1	0	0	0	0	0+0	0	0	0	0

- Last updated: 24 May 2016
- Source: au.soccerway.com
- (yellow card) = Number of bookings; (second yellow card) = Number of sending offs after a second yellow card; (red card) = Number of sending offs by a direct red card.

== Pre-season and friendlies ==
20 August 2015	Brisbane Roar	0–1	Melbourne Victory	Southport
19:00 AEST		Report	Geria 71'	Stadium: Fankhauser Reserve

25 August 2015	Port Melbourne	0–4	Melbourne Victory	Melbourne
19:30 AEST		Report	Pain 24', 37'; Ben Khalfallah 63' (pen.), 71'	Stadium: SS Anderson Reserve

9 September	Hume City	3–4	Melbourne Victory	Melbourne
19:30 AEST	Ingham 24'; Jackson 62'; Msahli 74'	Report	Berisha 27', 90+2'; Mahazi 33'; Broxham 90'	Stadium: ABD Stadium; Attendance: 1,858; Referee: Jonathan Barreiro

14 September	Melbourne Victory	3–0	Central Coast Mariners	Melbourne
14:00 AEST	Georgievski 50'; Berisha 58', 60'	Report		Stadium: AAMI Park; Attendance: 0 (Behind closed doors); Referee: Jonathan Barreiro

== Competitions ==
=== Overview ===
Competition	First match	Last match	Starting round	Final position	Record							
Competition	First match	Last match	Starting round	Final position	Pld	W	D	L	GF	GA	GD	Win %
A-League	9 October 2015	9 April 2016	Matchday 1	4th	27	11	8	8	40	33	+7	40.74
A-League Finals	15 April 2016		Elimination-finals	Elimination-finals	1	0	0	1	1	2	−1	0.00
FFA Cup	4 August 2015	7 November 2015	Round of 32	Winners	5	5	0	0	17	3	+14	100.00
AFC Champions League	24 February 2016	24 May 2016	Group stage	Round of 16	8	2	4	2	9	10	−1	25.00
Total					41	18	12	11	67	48	+19	43.90

Source: Competitions

=== A-League ===
==== League table ====
Pos	Team	Pld	W	D	L	GF	GA	GD	Pts	Qualification
1	Adelaide United (C)	27	14	7	6	45	28	+17	49	Qualification for 2017 AFC Champions League group stage and Finals series
2	Western Sydney Wanderers	27	14	6	7	44	33	+11	48	Qualification for 2017 AFC Champions League group stage and Finals series
3	Brisbane Roar	27	14	6	7	49	40	+9	48	Qualification for 2017 AFC Champions League second preliminary round and Finals series
4	Melbourne City	27	13	5	9	63	44	+19	44	Qualification for Finals series
5	Perth Glory	27	13	4	10	49	42	+7	43	Qualification for Finals series
6	Melbourne Victory	27	11	8	8	40	33	+7	41	Qualification for Finals series
7	Sydney FC	27	8	10	9	36	36	0	34	
8	Newcastle Jets	27	8	6	13	28	41	−13	30	
9	Wellington Phoenix (Note: Wellington Phoenix cannot qualify for the AFC Champions League as they are not recognised as an AFC club.)	27	7	4	16	34	54	−20	25	
10	Central Coast Mariners	27	3	4	20	33	70	−37	13	

Source: A-Leagues
Rules for classification: 1) points; 2) goal difference; 3) number of goals scored.
(C) Champions

==== Results summary ====
Overall								Home						Away					
Pld	W	D	L	GF	GA	GD	Pts	W	D	L	GF	GA	GD	W	D	L	GF	GA	GD
27	11	8	8	40	33	+7	41	7	5	1	21	9	+12	4	3	7	19	24	−5

Last updated: 9 April 2016.
Source: ultimatealeague.com

==== Results by round ====
Round	1	2	3	4	5	6	7	8	9	10	11	12	13	14	15	16	17	18	19	20	21	22	23	24	25	26	27
Ground	A	H	A	H	A	A	H	H	A	A	A	H	A	A	H	H	A	H	A	H	H	A	A	H	H	A	H
Result	D	W	L	W	L	W	W	W	L	L	L	D	W	D	W	W	L	D	D	L	D	W	L	D	W	W	D
Position	6	2	6	4	4	3	2	1	2	4	5	5	5	5	5	4	4	4	5	5	5	5	6	6	6	6	6

Updated to match(es) played on 9 April 2016. Source: ultimatealeague.com
A = Away; H = Home; W = Win; D = Draw; L = Loss

==== Matches ====
9 October 2015 1	Adelaide United	0–0	Melbourne Victory	Adelaide
Friday 19:10 ACDT		Report	Broxham (yellow card) 26' (yellow-red card) 72'	Stadium: Adelaide Oval; Attendance: 19,079; Referee: Peter Green

17 October 2015 2	Melbourne Victory	3–2	Melbourne City	Melbourne
19:30 AEDT	Ben Khalfallah 23'; Barbarouses 57'; Berisha 90'	Report	Fornaroli 69'; Mauk 71'	Stadium: Etihad Stadium; Attendance: 40,217; Referee: Jarred Gillett

23 October 2015 3	Newcastle Jets	1–0	Melbourne Victory	Newcastle
19:40 AEDT	Carney 75'	Report		Stadium: Hunter Stadium; Attendance: 10,087; Referee: Strebre Delovski

2 November 2015 4	Melbourne Victory	3–0	Wellington Phoenix	Melbourne
19:30 AEDT	Berisha 10', 61'; Durante 55' (o.g.)	Report		Stadium: Etihad Stadium; Attendance: 24,934; Referee: Shaun Evans

14 November 2015 6	Sydney FC	2–4	Melbourne Victory	Sydney
19:30 AEDT	Hološko 5'; Brosque 20'	Report	Berisha 9', 90+2'; Finkler 28'; Barbarouses 68'	Stadium: Allianz Stadium; Attendance: 15,947; Referee: Chris Beath

19 November 2015 7	Melbourne Victory	2–1	Central Coast Mariners	Melbourne
20:00 AEDT	Finkler 16', 19'	Report	Sim 89'	Stadium: AAMI Park; Attendance: 16,669; Referee: Ben Williams

28 November 2015 8	Melbourne Victory	2–1	Adelaide United	Melbourne
19:30 AEDT	Berisha 14' (pen.); Bozanic 30'	Report	Carrusca 87' (pen.)	Stadium: Etihad Stadium; Attendance: 23,415; Referee: Jarred Gillett

5 December 2015 9	Wellington Phoenix	2–0	Melbourne Victory	Auckland
19:15 NZDT	Krishna 18'; Bonevacia 44'	Report		Stadium: QBE Stadium; Attendance: 10,852; Referee: Alan Milliner

12 December 2015 10	Western Sydney Wanderers	2–0	Melbourne Victory	Parramatta
19:30 AEDT	Bridge 54'; Castelen 79'	Report		Stadium: Pirtek Stadium; Attendance: 17,073; Referee: Shaun Evans

16 December 2015 5	Perth Glory	1–0	Melbourne Victory	Perth
18:00 AWST	Castro 74'	Report		Stadium: nib Stadium; Attendance: 5,398; Referee: Chris Beath

19 December 2015 11	Melbourne City	2–1	Melbourne Victory	Melbourne
19:30 AEDT	Mauk 20'; Retre 30'	Report	Berisha 45'	Stadium: AAMI Park; Attendance: 23,572; Referee: Ben Williams

27 December 2015 12	Melbourne Victory	1–1	Perth Glory	Melbourne
17:00 AEDT	Berisha 25' (pen.)	Report	Castro 74' (pen.)	Stadium: AAMI Park; Attendance: 22,544; Referee: Shaun Evans

3 January 2016 13	Newcastle Jets	0–1	Melbourne Victory	Newcastle
17:00 AEDT		Report	Ben Khalfallah 71'	Stadium: Hunter Stadium; Attendance: 8,864; Referee: Jarred Gillett

8 January 2016 14	Central Coast Mariners	3–3	Melbourne Victory	Geelong
19:40 AEDT	Ascroft 12'; Bingham 30'; Austin 35'	Report	Berisha 60' (pen.), 90+2'; Thompson 66'	Stadium: Simonds Stadium; Attendance: 14,268; Referee: Peter Green

15 January 2016 15	Melbourne Victory	4–0	Brisbane Roar	Melbourne
19:40 AEDT	Ben Khalfallah 5'; Barbarouses 11', 30'; Berisha 52'	Report		Stadium: AAMI Park; Attendance: 23,207; Referee: Shaun Evans

26 January 2016 16	Melbourne Victory	1–0	Sydney FC	Melbourne
19:30 AEDT	Jurman 79' (o.g.)	Report		Stadium: Etihad Stadium; Attendance: 30,493; Referee: Strebre Delovski

30 January 2016 17	Perth Glory	3–2	Melbourne Victory	Perth
18:40 AWST	Keogh 27'; Castro 29', 82' (pen.)	Report	Berisha 44', 69'; Ben Khalfallah (red card) 57'	Stadium: nib Stadium; Attendance: 10,501; Referee: Kris Griffiths-Jones

6 February 2016 18	Melbourne Victory	1–1	Western Sydney Wanderers	Melbourne
19:30 AEDT	Berisha 16'	Report	Šantalab 89'; Alberto (red card) 90+3'	Stadium: Etihad Stadium; Attendance: 25,445; Referee: Ben Williams

13 February 2016 19	Melbourne City	2–2	Melbourne Victory	Melbourne
19:30 AEDT	Fornaroli 22', 31'; Cáceres (yellow card) 12' (yellow-red card) 79'	Report	Khalfallah 28'; Finkler 47'	Stadium: AAMI Park; Attendance: 25,738; Referee: Chris Beath

19 February 2016 20	Melbourne Victory	0–1	Adelaide United	Melbourne
19:40 AEDT		Report	Kamau 90'	Stadium: AAMI Park; Attendance: 18,924; Referee: Ben Williams

27 February 2016 21	Melbourne Victory	1–1	Sydney FC	Melbourne
19:30 AEDT	Barbarouses 46'	Report	Faty (red card) 64'; Carney 76'	Stadium: AAMI Park; Attendance: 20,112; Referee: Kris Griffiths-Jones

6 March 2016 22	Central Coast Mariners	0–2	Melbourne Victory	Gosford
17:00 AEDT	Neill (yellow card) 7' (yellow-red card) 48'	Report	Berisha 12'; Ben Khalfallah 90'	Stadium: Central Coast Stadium; Attendance: 5,032; Referee: Shaun Evans

12 March 2016 23	Brisbane Roar	5–0	Melbourne Victory	Brisbane
18:30 AEST	Maclaren 18', 22', 87'; Brown 55'; Corona 76'	Report		Stadium: Suncorp Stadium; Attendance: 15,892; Referee: Jarred Gillett

20 March 2016 24	Melbourne Victory	1–1	Newcastle Jets	Melbourne
17:00 AEDT	Berisha 57'	Report	Kitto 37'; D. Mullen (yellow card) 5' (yellow-red card) 39'	Stadium: AAMI Park; Attendance: 14,383; Referee: Chris Beath

25 March 2016 25	Melbourne Victory	2–0	Western Sydney Wanderers	Melbourne
19:40 AEDT	Bozanic 3', 66'	Report		Stadium: AAMI Park; Attendance: 20,097; Referee: Strebre Delovski

2 April 2016 26	Wellington Phoenix	1–4	Melbourne Victory	Wellington
19:15 NZDT	Riera (yellow card) 45+2' (yellow-red card) 55'; Bonevacia 82'	Report	Berisha 8' (red card) 35'; Bozanic 19'; Barbarouses 56'; Howard 90+3'	Stadium: Westpac Stadium; Attendance: 5,103; Referee: Ben Williams

9 April 2016 27	Melbourne Victory	0–0	Brisbane Roar	Melbourne
19:30 AEST		Report		Stadium: AAMI Park; Attendance: 20,012; Referee: Peter Green

==== Finals series ====
15 April 2016 Elimination-finals	Brisbane Roar	2–1	Melbourne Victory	Brisbane
19:30 AEST	McKay 88'; Broich 90+3'	Report	Geria (red card) 83'; Berisha 86'	Stadium: Suncorp Stadium; Attendance: 20,157; Referee: Jarred Gillett

=== FFA Cup ===
4 August 2015 Round of 32	Balmain Tigers (New South Wales)	0–6	(Victoria (state)) Melbourne Victory	Sydney
19:30 AEST		Report	Berisha 11'; Pain 41'; Barbarouses 56'; Georgievski 58'; Howard 70'; Ben Khalfallah 84'	Stadium: Leichhardt Oval; Attendance: 4,849; Referee: Steve Lucas

1 September 2015 Round of 16	Rockdale City Suns (New South Wales)	2–3	(Victoria (state)) Melbourne Victory	Sydney
19:30 AEST	Ješić 53' (pen.); Broxham 86' (o.g.)	Report	Makarounas 29', 65'; Berisha 50'	Stadium: Jubilee Oval; Attendance: 4,165; Referee: Katie Patterson

22 September 2015 Quarter-finals	Melbourne Victory (Victoria (state))	3–1	(South Australia) Adelaide United	Melbourne
19:30 AEST	Finkler 10'; Barbarouses 45+1'; Berisha 82' (pen.)	Report	Carrusca 78' (pen.)	Stadium: AAMI Park; Attendance: 10,521; Referee: Peter Green

28 October 2015 Semi-finals	Hume City (Victoria (state))	0–3	(Victoria (state)) Melbourne Victory	Melbourne
19:30 AEDT		Report	Berisha 41' (pen.); Barbarouses 89'; Geria 90+4'	Stadium: AAMI Park; Attendance: 6,575; Referee: Ben Williams

7 November 2015 Final	Melbourne Victory (Victoria (state))	2–0	(Western Australia) Perth Glory	Melbourne
19:30 AEDT	Bozanic 35'; Berisha 42'	Report		Stadium: AAMI Park; Attendance: 15,098; Referee: Ben Williams

=== AFC Champions League ===
==== Group stage ====
Pos	Team	Pld	W	D	L	GF	GA	GD	Pts	Qualification
1	(China) Shanghai SIPG	6	4	0	2	10	8	+2	12	Advance to knockout stage
2	(Australia) Melbourne Victory	6	2	3	1	7	7	0	9 (Note: Head-to-head points: Melbourne Victory 2, Suwon Samsung Bluewings 2. Head-to-head away goal: Melbourne Victory 1, Suwon Samsung Bluewings 0)	Advance to knockout stage
3	(South Korea) Suwon Samsung Bluewings	6	2	3	1	7	4	+3	9	
4	(Japan) Gamba Osaka	6	0	2	4	4	9	−5	2	

Source: AFC
Rules for classification: Group stage tiebreakers
Notes:

24 February 2016 1	Melbourne Victory (Australia)	2–1	(China) Shanghai SIPG	Melbourne, Australia
19:45 AEDT	Ingham 31'; Berisha 73' (pen.)	Report	Wu Lei 52'	Stadium: Melbourne Rectangular Stadium; Attendance: 9,701; Referee: Abdulrahman Al-Jassim (Qatar)

2 March 2016 2	Gamba Osaka (Japan)	1–1	(Australia) Melbourne Victory	Suita, Japan
19:00 JST	Endō 57'	Report	Ansell 3'	Stadium: Suita City Football Stadium; Attendance: 14,270; Referee: Ahmed Al-Kaf (Oman)

15 March 2016 3	Melbourne Victory (Australia)	0–0	(South Korea) Suwon Samsung Bluewings	Melbourne, Australia
19:45 AEDT		Report		Stadium: Melbourne Rectangular Stadium; Attendance: 7,066; Referee: Muhammad Taqi Aljaafari Bin Jahari (Singapore)

6 April 2016 4	Suwon Samsung Bluewings (South Korea)	1–1	(Australia) Melbourne Victory	Suwon, South Korea
19:30 KST	Kwon 58'	Report	Barbarouses 60'	Stadium: Suwon World Cup Stadium; Attendance: 6,123; Referee: Adham Makhadmeh (Jordan)

19 April 2016 5	Shanghai SIPG (China)	3–1	(Australia) Melbourne Victory	Shanghai, China
19:30 CST	Yu 38'; Elkeson 40'; Conca 65' (pen.)	Report	Makarounas 81'	Stadium: Shanghai Stadium; Attendance: 32,355; Referee: Fahad Al-Marri (Qatar)

3 May 2016 6	Melbourne Victory (Australia)	2–1	(Japan) Gamba Osaka	Melbourne, Australia
20:00 AEST	Berisha 13' (pen.); Thompson 16'	Report	Ademilson 84'	Stadium: Melbourne Rectangular Stadium; Attendance: 10,147; Referee: Ravshan Irmatov (Uzbekistan)

==== Round of 16 ====
17 May 2016 First leg	Melbourne Victory (Australia)	1–1	(South Korea) Jeonbuk Hyundai Motors	Melbourne, Australia
19:45 AEST	Berisha 5'	Report	Leonardo 14'	Stadium: Melbourne Rectangular Stadium; Attendance: 11,542; Referee: Alireza Faghani (Iran)

24 May 2016 Second leg	Jeonbuk Hyundai Motors (South Korea)	2–1 (3–2 agg.)	(Australia) Melbourne Victory	Jeonju, South Korea
19:00 KST	Leonardo 29', 71'	Report	Berisha 84'	Stadium: Jeonju World Cup Stadium; Attendance: 12,811; Referee: Hettikamkanamge Perera (Sri Lanka)
