= Leigh Broxham =

Australian soccer player (born 1988)

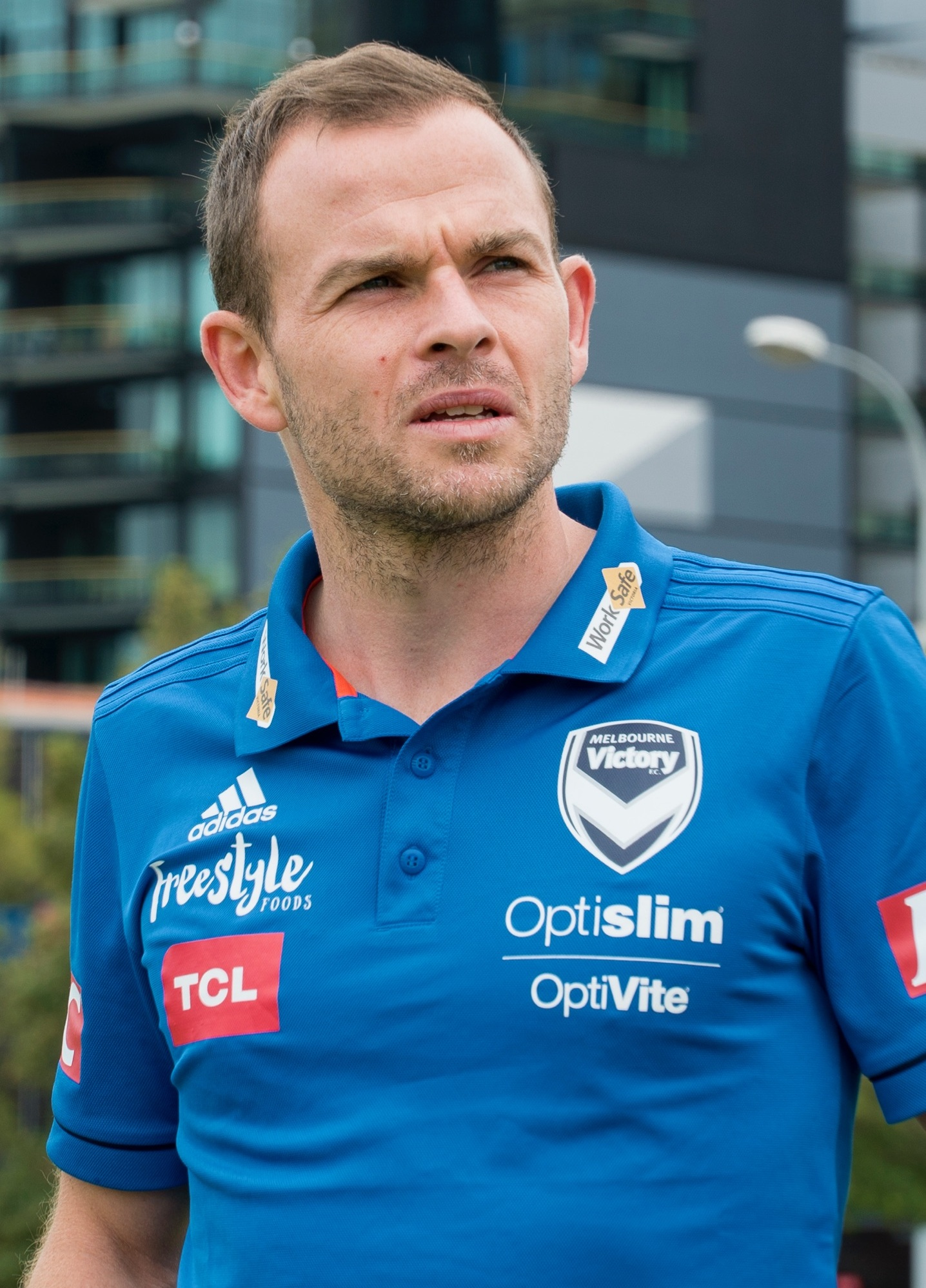
- Broxham with Melbourne Victory in 2018

Personal information
- Full name: Leigh Michael Broxham
- Date of birth: 13 January 1988 (age 38)
- Place of birth: Melbourne, Australia
- Height: 1.70 m (5 ft 7 in)
- Positions: Midfielder; defender

Team information
- Current team: Bentleigh Greens

Youth career
- Knox City
- 2003–2005: VIS

Senior career*
Years	Team	Apps	(Gls)
2006–2024	Melbourne Victory	386	(5)
2024	St Albans Dinamo	6	(0)
2025–	Bentleigh Greens	28	(3)

International career^{‡}
2004–2005	Australia U17	14	(5)
2007–2008	Australia U23	12	(3)
2008	Australia	1	(0)
- * Club domestic league appearances and goals as of 8 May 2026 ‡ National team caps and goals as of 10 November 2010

Leigh Michael Broxham (born 13 January 1988) is an Australian professional soccer player, currently playing for semi-professional club Bentleigh Greens in Victoria Premier League 1.

Born in Melbourne, Broxham played youth football at the Victorian Institute of Sport before making his professional debut in 2007 for Melbourne Victory, where he continued to play for over a decade and 300 appearances.

Broxham has made one appearance for Australia, in a debut on a friendly match which ended a draw with Singapore in 2008.

Broxham is the most capped player in A-League Men history, with 386 appearances, and is Melbourne Victory's most capped player of all time, with 461 appearances in all competitions.

== Club career ==
The attacking midfielder, who is known for his long range free kicks, sharp passing and toughness, joined the Victorian Institute of Sport whilst playing his club football at Knox City in Melbourne's east in 2003. He was selected as captain of the Victorian under 16 squad in 2004 before representing Australia the following year at the under 17 FIFA World Cup in Peru. Recruited from the Victorian Institute of Sport by Melbourne Victory FC, Broxham trained with the first-team squad for twelve months as the Football Team Assistant before being brought in to the actual squad prior to Round 19.

It was announced on 21 March 2007 that Broxham had signed a new three-year deal with the club. Leigh was left out of the squad for the majority of the 2008/2009 championship season. However, after having an excellent pre season, including scoring a 25-yard free kick and assisting multiple goals, he has played every game in the 2009/10 season. Broxham was the second of six nominees that will vie for the inaugural NAB Young Footballer of the Year Award at the conclusion of the Hyundai A-League 2009/10 season.

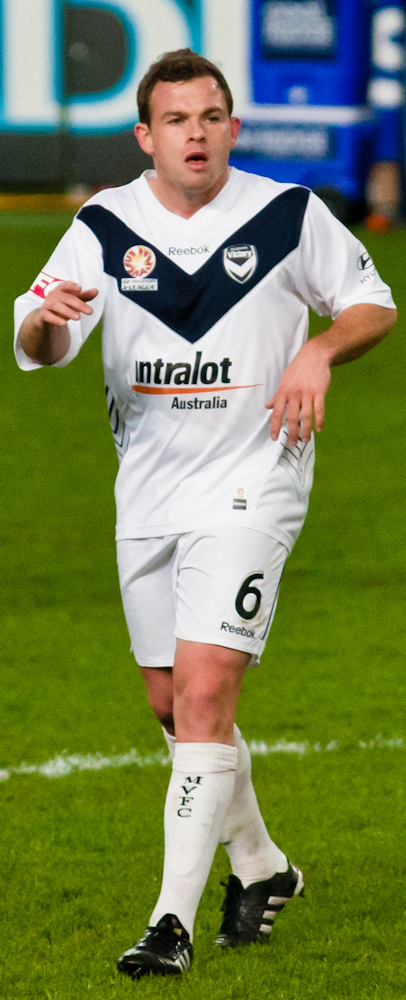
Broxham playing for Melbourne Victory in 2010

He scored his first ever goal for Melbourne in their clash against Sydney FC in the opening round of the 2010–11 A-League season. Broxham has become a fan favourite for his excellent technique.

In the 2012–2013 A-League season under new boss Ange Postecoglou, Leigh Broxham initially began the season with lacklustre performances including a 5–0 defeat against Brisbane Roar. However, since the injuries of several key Melbourne Victory defenders, he was asked to fill in at centre back against Sydney FC and Newcastle Jets Alessandro Del Piero and Emile Heskey and performed admirably inspiring new chants from the Victory supporters. His goal against Brisbane Roar later in the season with a flying header attempt summed up the success of his season which was rewarded by a further 3-year contract.

With Melbourne Victory finishing 3rd, they subsequently qualified for a play-off match in order to participate in the Asian Champions League. On 15 February 2014, Melbourne Victory faced Muangthong United who were 2nd in their domestic league. Melbourne Victory was the first to concede with a goal scored directly from a corner. After captain Mark Milligan could not convert a penalty kick and trailing on the score board, Leigh Broxham managed to provide a pass to Scott Galloway who then crossed a ball into the head of James Troisi scoring the equalizer. Broxham then went on to capitalize on a loose ball from a corner with a shot outside the box into the net to score the eventual winner ending the match 2–1 to send Melbourne Victory to the Asian Champions League. Soon later on their first ACL Group stage match away against Guangzhou Evergrande, Broxham would score from a loose headed ball off a corner with a volley blasting into the back of the net to send Melbourne Victory 2–0 up, a match in which ended in a 2–4 defeat.

The 2014-2015 A-league calendar would continue to challenge Leigh Broxham to find a spot in the starting lineup with both Mark Milligan and new-signing Carl Valeri preferred as first choice central midfielders. International duties to Milligan and injuries to either Delpierre, Leijer or Ansell would call upon his services to fill in the gaps. Noticeably, Melbourne Victory's first clean-sheet came upon when Broxham was started at central defence and would keep a further 3 clean sheets in a row to start the season in the same position. Near the end of the season, Broxham became determined to find a place in the starting line-up after all key players in midfield and central defence were playing fit and consistent football and thus he subsequently landed his place at right-back. His combination play with Kosta Barbarouses and overlapping runs found himself in strong positions in the final third including an assist to Besart Berisha in the A-league semi-finals against Melbourne City after left-winger Harry Novillo failed to track back Broxham's run. It was then in the 2015 A-League Grand Final where his high pressing forced an eventual turnover from Sydney FC which lead to teammate Gui Finkler to assist Berisha to open the scoring. Whilst there were little opportunities to find overlapping runs for the entirety of the game, it was until the 90th minute where Fahid Ben Khalfallah found Leigh Broxham who sprinted from own half to receive the ball inside the box and finish the ball into the near post to seal the Championship 3–0.

Broxham also filled out as vice-captain on numerous occasions throughout the 2012–13 season, and captained Melbourne in the famous friendly match between Melbourne and Liverpool in front of over 95,500 at the MCG.

After the departure of Ola Toivonen, Broxham served as Melbourne Victory's captain for the final five matches of the 2019–20 A-League season. He was permanently elevated to the captaincy for the 2020–21 A-League season. He was replaced as captain by Joshua Brillante for the 2021–22 A-League season.

As of May 2021, he currently holds the record for most appearances for Melbourne Victory, playing 427 times across multiple competitions. Broxham is one of the A-League's most decorated players having played in all of Melbourne Victory's title-winning sides including four championships, three premierships and two FFA Cups. A natural defensive midfielder, Broxham, nicknamed "Brox", can also play as an attacking midfielder, central midfielder, box-to-box midfielder, centre back, left back or right back. Broxham was named captain of Melbourne Victory at the commencement of the 2021 A-League season.

Broxham would announce on 23 April 2024 his retirement from professional football at the end of the 2023-24 season. Melbourne Victory would use their final regular season game to celebrate his career at the club. He would join St Albans Saints impacting immediately creating a 1-0 upset win in his debut against Heidelberg United.

== Playing style ==
Broxham is a versatile midfielder who can slot in as central defence, right-back, or a left-back when needed. His commitment on the pitch enforcing his presence against opposition players have been admired by all managers of Melbourne Victory including Ernie Merrick, Mehmet Durakovic, Jim Magilton, Ange Postecoglou and Kevin Muscat. His style of play can often be compared to Claude Makélélé, who, when in possession of the ball, makes seemingly overly conservative passes without posing a threat to the opposition. However, his role has revolved around recovering the ball from contests or off the opponent and being the first to start the string of passes where the team can construct an attack pattern. This potential was not seen until Ange Postecoglou took charge and changed the overall philosophy of the team and subsequently Broxham's recovery and distribution skills could be appreciated.

In the 2014/15 season, Broxham has found himself in central defence in no less than 6 matches to cover for the injuries to fellow defenders Matthieu Delpierre and Nick Ansell recording 4 clean sheets despite his obvious lack of height. Opposition's forward pressing were also noted to have failed as a result of Broxham's comfortable midfield ball control and awareness, who under pressure can easily advance forward and/or distribute passes reliably. Despite the previously mentioned lack of height, he has successfully scored with his head against Brisbane Roar in the 13/14 season, and Adelaide United in the 14/15 season. His aerial threat has been consistent throughout the 14/15 season including 3 attempted headers at goal against Brisbane Roar in a 1–0 win. He also scored the third goal in the 2015 Grand Final win against Sydney FC at AAMI park with a near post finish following an over-lapping run on the right.

In the 2016/17 season, Broxham found himself occupying the left-back role giving consistent and reliable performances. During the latter parts of the season with the departure of midfielder Oliver Bozanic, Broxham returned to central midfield once again partnering with Carl Valeri and bossing the oppositions off the park especially during the finals series against Brisbane Roar and Sydney FC.

In the 2017/18 season with the departure of Daniel Georgievski, Broxham filled in the role of left-back for the season and in typical fashion performed reliably defensively. Broxham and the team finished the season with a championship trophy.

With the departure of Kevin Muscat, managers Marco Kurz, Carlos Salvachua and Grant Brebner mainly utilized Broxham back in the centre of midfield with the prospect of maintaining possession and distributing the ball laterally.

== Milestones ==
Despite not playing in its inaugural season, Leigh Broxham became the third footballer to play 150 A-League matches on 15 March 2014. Coincidentally, the first two players to reach this milestone also play for Melbourne Victory – former topscorer Archie Thompson, and former captain Adrian Leijer, who reached this milestone earlier in the 2013/14 season, in the 1000th A-League match, a 0–2 loss to the Newcastle Jets.

== Personal life ==
Broxham was born and raised in Melbourne, Australia to parents of English ancestry.

His wife Sam gave birth to triplets in May 2016.

== Career statistics ==
=== Club ===
As of match played 8 July 2024

Appearances and goals by club, season and competition
Club	Season	League			Cup		Continental		Total	
Club	Season	Division	Apps	Goals	Apps	Goals	Apps	Goals	Apps	Goals
Melbourne Victory	2005–06	A-League Men	0	0	1	0	—		1	0
Melbourne Victory	2006–07	A-League Men	4	0	0	0	—		4	0
Melbourne Victory	2007–08	A-League Men	17	0	5	0	5	0	27	0
Melbourne Victory	2008–09	A-League Men	8	0	0	0	—		8	0
Melbourne Victory	2009–10	A-League Men	29	0	0	0	5	0	34	0
Melbourne Victory	2010–11	A-League Men	22	1	0	0	5	0	27	1
Melbourne Victory	2011–12	A-League Men	23	0	0	0	—		23	0
Melbourne Victory	2012–13	A-League Men	25	1	0	0	—		25	1
Melbourne Victory	2013–14	A-League Men	27	0	0	0	7	2	34	2
Melbourne Victory	2014–15	A-League Men	28	3	3	0	—		31	3
Melbourne Victory	2015–16	A-League Men	25	0	5	0	8	0	38	0
Melbourne Victory	2016–17	A-League Men	29	0	4	0	—		33	0
Melbourne Victory	2017–18	A-League Men	27	0	2	0	6	0	35	0
Melbourne Victory	2018–19	A-League Men	28	0	2	0	4	0	34	0
Melbourne Victory	2019–20	A-League Men	23	0	1	0	6	0	30	0
Melbourne Victory	2020–21	A-League Men	21	0	—		—		21	0
Melbourne Victory	2021–22	A-League Men	12	0	4	0	1	0	17	0
Melbourne Victory	2022–23	A-League Men	20	0	1	0	—		21	0
Melbourne Victory	2023–24	A-League Men	5	0	—		—		5	0
Career total			386	5	28	0	47	2	461	7

=== International ===
Appearances and goals by national team, year and competition
Team	Year	Competitive		Friendly		Total	
Team	Year	Apps	Goals	Apps	Goals	Apps	Goals
Australia	2008	0	0	1	0	1	0

== Honours ==
Melbourne Victory

- A-League Championship: 2006–07, 2008–09, 2014–15, 2017–18
- A-League Premiership: 2006–07, 2008–09, 2014–15
- Australia Cup: 2015, 2021

Australia U17

- OFC U-17 Championship: 2005

== See also ==
- List of Melbourne Victory FC players
- List of one-club men
