= Ben Khalfallah =

Ben Khalfallah is a surname. Notable people with the surname include:

- Fahid Ben Khalfallah (born 1982), French-Tunisian footballer
- Nejib Ben Khalfallah (1967–2020), Tunisian dancer, choreographer and actor
