= 2014–15 Melbourne Victory FC season =

Melbourne Victory
2014–15 season
- Chairman: Anthony Di Pietro
- Manager: Kevin Muscat
- Stadium: AAMI Park, Melbourne
- A-League: Premiers
- A-League Finals Series: Champions
- FFA Cup: Quarter-finals
- Top goalscorer: League: Besart Berisha (13); All: Besart Berisha (18)
- Highest home attendance: 50,873 vs Melbourne City; 8 May 2015
- Lowest home attendance: 18,205 vs Central Coast Mariners; 27 March 2015
- Average home league attendance: 25,931
Home colours	Away colours

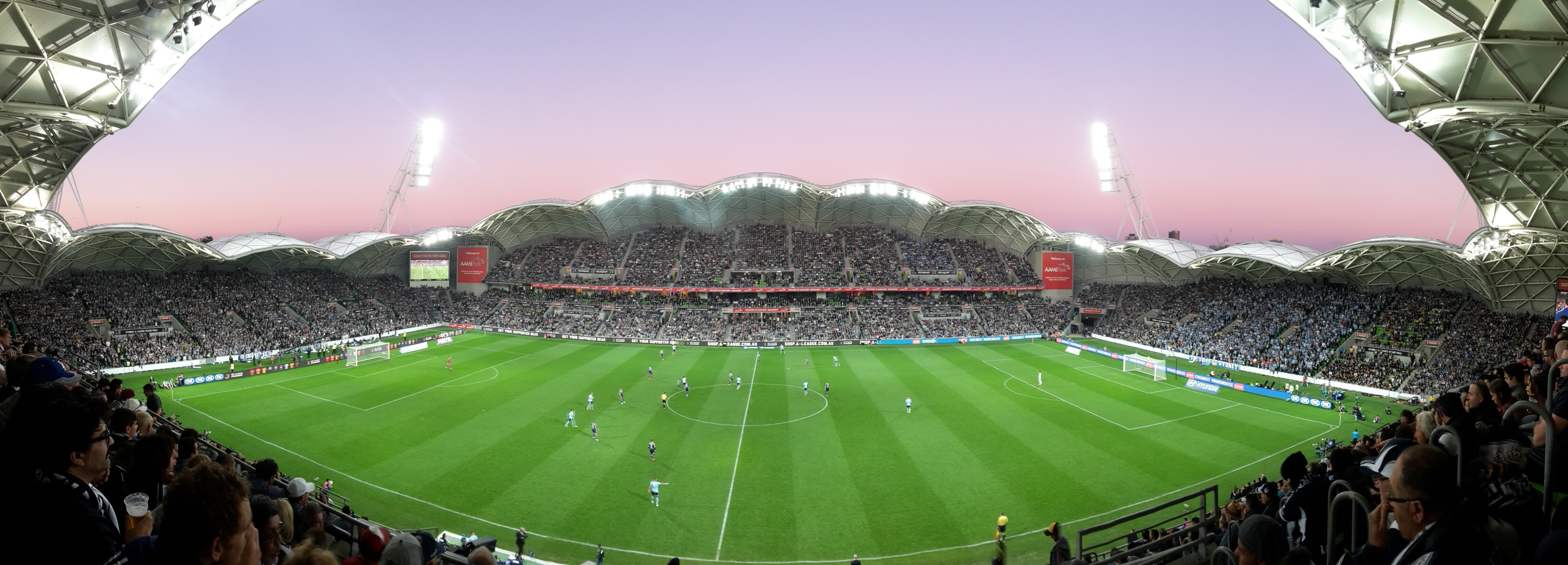
2015 A-League Grand Final at AAMI Park

The 2014–15 Melbourne Victory FC season was the club's 10th season since its establishment in 2004. The club participated in the A-League for the 10th time, winning the double for the third time, and competed in the FFA Cup for the first time.

== Players ==
=== Squad information ===
Note: Flags indicate national team as defined under FIFA eligibility rules; some limited exceptions apply. Players may hold more than one non-FIFA nationality.

No.	Pos.	Nation	Player
1	GK	AUS	Nathan Coe
2	DF	AUS	Jason Geria
4	DF	AUS	Nick Ansell
5	MF	AUS	Mark Milligan (captain)
6	MF	AUS	Leigh Broxham (vice-captain)
7	MF	BRA	Gui Finkler
8	FW	ALB	Besart Berisha
9	FW	NZL	Kosta Barbarouses
10	FW	AUS	Archie Thompson
11	FW	AUS	Connor Pain
13	FW	AUS	Andrew Nabbout

No.	Pos.	Nation	Player
14	MF	TUN	Fahid Ben Khalfallah
15	DF	MKD	Daniel Georgievski
16	MF	AUS	Rashid Mahazi
17	DF	FRA	Matthieu Delpierre
18	DF	AUS	Dylan Murnane
20	GK	AUS	Lawrence Thomas
21	MF	AUS	Carl Valeri
22	MF	AUS	Jesse Makarounas
24	DF	AUS	Scott Galloway
26	MF	AUS	Jordan Brown
40	GK	AUS	Michael Turnbull

=== From the youth system ===
Note: Flags indicate national team as defined under FIFA eligibility rules; some limited exceptions apply. Players may hold more than one non-FIFA nationality.

No.	Pos.	Nation	Player
31	MF	AUS	Kieran Dover
33	DF	AUS	Christian Cavallo
34	DF	AUS	Thomas Deng

No.	Pos.	Nation	Player
35	FW	AUS	George Howard
42	GK	AUS	Lucas Spinella

=== Transfers in ===
No.	Pos.	Nat.	Name	Age	Moving from	Type	Transfer window	Ends	Transfer fee	Source
8	FW	(Albania)	Besart Berisha	28	Brisbane Roar	Transfer	Pre-season	2016	Free	footballaustralia.com.au
21	MF	(Australia)	Carl Valeri	29	Ternana (Italy)	Transfer	Pre-season	2017	Free	footballaustralia.com.au
17	DF	(France)	Matthieu Delpierre	33	Utrecht (Netherlands)	Transfer	Pre-season	2015	Free	footballaustralia.com.au
15	DF	(North Macedonia)	Daniel Georgievski	26	Steaua București (Romania)	Transfer	Pre-season	2015	Free	melbournevictory.com.au
14	MF	(Tunisia)	Fahid Ben Khalfallah	31	Troyes (France)	Transfer	Pre-season	2015	Free	melbournevictory.com.au
40	GK	(Australia)	Michael Turnbull	30	Brisbane Strikers	Injury Replacement	Mid-season	2015		melbournevictory.com.au

=== Transfers out ===
No.	Pos.	Nat.	Name	Age	Moving to	Type	Transfer window	Transfer fee	Source
2	DF	(Chile)	Pablo Contreras	35		Retired	Pre-season	Free	
17	MF	(Australia)	James Jeggo	22	Adelaide United	Signed pre-season contract	Pre-season	Free	
21	MF	(Australia)	Tom Rogic	21	Celtic (Scotland)	End of loan	Pre-season	Free	
18	DF	(Australia)	Francesco Stella	22	Free agent	Released	Pre-season		
14	FW	(Australia)	James Troisi	25	Atalanta (Italy)	End of loan	Pre-season	Free	
3	DF	(Ivory Coast)	Adama Traoré	24	Vitória de Guimarães (Portugal)	End of contract	Pre-season	Free	
27	FW	(Australia)	Christopher Cristaldo	20	Werribee City		Mid-season		
23	DF	(Australia)	Adrian Leijer	28	Chongqing Lifan (China)	Transfer	Mid-season		

== Technical staff ==
Position	Name
Manager	(Australia) Kevin Muscat
Assistant Manager	(Australia) Jean-Paul de Marigny
Goalkeeping Coach	(Australia) Steve Mautone
Youth Team Manager	(Wales) Darren Davies
Youth Team Assistant Manager	(New Zealand) Vaughan Coveny
Youth Team Developmental Manager	(Australia) John Aloisi
Youth Goalkeeping Coach	(Australia) Dean Anastasiadis
Strength & Conditioning Coach	(Australia) Anthony Crea
Physiotherapist	(Australia) Travis Maude

== Statistics ==
=== Squad statistics ===
N	Pos.	Nat.	Name	Total					A-League					FFA Cup
N	Pos.	Nat.	Name	Apps	Goals	Yellow card	Second yellow card	Red card	Apps	Goals	Yellow card	Second yellow card	Red card	Apps	Goals	Yellow card	Second yellow card	Red card
1	GK	(Australia)	Nathan Coe	26	0	1	0	0	23	0	1	0	0	3	0	0	0	0
2	DF	(Australia)	Jason Geria	18	0	3	0	0	14+2	0	3	0	0	2	0	0	0	0
4	DF	(Australia)	Nick Ansell	22	1	4	0	0	19+3	1	4	0	0	0	0	0	0	0
5	MF	(Australia)	Mark Milligan	23	1	6	0	0	20	1	6	0	0	2+1	0	0	0	0
6	MF	(Australia)	Leigh Broxham	31	3	8	0	0	23+5	3	7	0	0	2+1	0	1	0	0
7	MF	(Brazil)	Guilherme Finkler	29	9	4	0	0	24+2	7	4	0	0	2+1	2	0	0	0
8	FW	(Albania)	Besart Berisha	31	18	6	0	0	28	15	6	0	0	3	3	0	0	0
9	FW	(New Zealand)	Kosta Barbarouses	28	7	4	0	0	22+3	6	3	0	0	3	1	1	0	0
10	FW	(Australia)	Archie Thompson	28	12	1	0	0	16+10	11	1	0	0	1+1	1	0	0	0
11	FW	(Australia)	Connor Pain	15	3	0	0	0	0+13	2	0	0	0	1+1	1	0	0	0
13	FW	(Australia)	Andrew Nabbout	6	0	0	0	0	0+5	0	0	0	0	0+1	0	0	0	0
14	MF	(Tunisia)	Fahid Ben Khalfallah	28	6	8	0	0	24+3	5	8	0	0	1	1	0	0	0
15	DF	(North Macedonia)	Daniel Georgievski	22	3	4	1	0	18+3	3	4	0	0	1	0	0	1	0
16	MF	(Australia)	Rashid Mahazi	22	0	1	0	0	5+16	0	1	0	0	0+1	0	0	0	0
17	DF	(France)	Matthieu Delpierre	18	2	2	0	0	14+1	1	2	0	0	3	1	0	0	0
18	DF	(Australia)	Dylan Murnane	9	0	1	0	0	6+1	0	1	0	0	2	0	0	0	0
20	GK	(Australia)	Lawrence Thomas	7	0	0	0	0	6+1	0	0	0	0	0	0	0	0	0
21	MF	(Australia)	Carl Valeri	31	2	3	1	1	29	2	3	1	1	2	0	0	0	0
22	MF	(Australia)	Jesse Makarounas	11	0	0	0	0	2+7	0	0	0	0	1+1	0	0	0	0
24	DF	(Australia)	Scott Galloway	15	1	1	0	0	12+1	1	1	0	0	1+1	0	0	0	0
26	MF	(Australia)	Jordan Brown	1	0	0	0	0	0+1	0	0	0	0	0	0	0	0	0
31	MF	(Australia)	Kieran Dover	1	0	0	0	0	0+1	0	0	0	0	0	0	0	0	0
33	DF	(Australia)	Christian Cavallo	0	0	0	0	0	0	0	0	0	0	0	0	0	0	0
34	DF	(Australia)	Thomas Deng	0	0	0	0	0	0	0	0	0	0	0	0	0	0	0
35	FW	(Australia)	George Howard	1	0	0	0	0	0+1	0	0	0	0	0	0	0	0	0
40	GK	(Australia)	Michael Turnbull	0	0	0	0	0	0	0	0	0	0	0	0	0	0	0
42	GK	(Australia)	Lucas Spinella	0	0	0	0	0	0	0	0	0	0	0	0	0	0	0
Players no longer at the club:
23	DF	(Australia)	Adrian Leijer	17	0	7	1	0	14	0	7	0	0	3	0	0	1	0

- Last updated: 17 May 2015
- Source: au.soccerway.com
- (yellow card) = Number of bookings; (second yellow card) = Number of sending offs after a second yellow card; (red card) = Number of sending offs by a direct red card.

== Pre-season and friendlies ==
22 July 2014 Friendly	Bentleigh Greens (Australia)	0–3	(Australia) Melbourne Victory	Cheltenham, Melbourne
19:30		Report	Pain 18'; Broxham 38'; Makarounas 57' (pen.)	Stadium: Kingston Heath Soccer Complex

29 July 2014 Friendly	Hume City (Australia)	1–4	(Australia) Melbourne Victory	Westmeadows, Melbourne
19:30	Desmit 29'	Report	Berisha 37'; Finkler 73'; Howard 75'; Thompson 80'	Stadium: John Ilhan Memorial Reserve

5 August 2014 Friendly	Port Melbourne (Australia)	0–5	(Australia) Melbourne Victory	Port Melbourne, Melbourne
19:00		Report	Broxham 24' (pen.); Nabbout 53', 81'; Leijer 58'; Pain 83'	Stadium: SS Anderson Reserve; Referee: Lucien Laverdure

10 August 2014 Friendly	Richmond (Australia)	0–3	(Australia) Melbourne Victory	Burnley, Melbourne
15:00		Report	Delpierre 14'; Pain 26'; Makarounas 45'	Stadium: Kevin Bartlett Reserve

26 August 2014 Friendly	Ballarat Red Devils (Australia)	0–10	(Australia) Melbourne Victory	Redan, Ballarat
19:00		Report	Pain 2', 37', 48'; Finkler 26'; Nabbout 30'; Galloway 56'; Milligan 68'; Barbarouses 70', 89'; Thompson 83'	Stadium: Ballarat Regional Soccer Facility

7 September 2014 Friendly	Melbourne Victory (Australia)	3–0	(Australia) Perth Glory	Melbourne
14:00	Finkler 35'; Berisha 69', 75' (pen.)	Report		Stadium: AAMI Park; Attendance: 0 (Behind closed doors); Referee: Shaun Evans

12 September 2014 Friendly	Adelaide United (Australia)	0–1	(Australia) Melbourne Victory	Adelaide
15:00 (ACST)		Report	Berisha 34' (pen.)	Stadium: Coopers Stadium; Attendance: 0 (Behind closed doors); Referee: Adam Fielding

28 September 2014 Friendly	Victory League All Stars (Australia)	2–1	(Australia) Melbourne Victory Youth	Hobart
12:15	Brassington 25'; Holden 71'		Katebian 90+3'	Stadium: North Hobart Oval

28 September 2014 Friendly	Melbourne Victory (Australia)	1–1	(Australia) Sydney FC	Hobart
15:00	Ben Khalfallah 90'	Report	Janko 21'	Stadium: North Hobart Oval; Attendance: 6,920; Referee: Shaun Evans

== Competitions ==
=== Overall ===
Competition	Started round	Final position / round	First match	Last match
A-League	—	Premiers	10 October 2014	26 April 2015
A-League Finals	Semi-finals	Champions	8 May 2015	17 May 2015
FFA Cup	Round of 32	Quarter-finals	20 August 2014	29 October 2014

=== A-League ===
==== League table ====
Pos	Team	Pld	W	D	L	GF	GA	GD	Pts	Qualification
1	Melbourne Victory (C)	27	15	8	4	56	31	+25	53	Qualification for 2016 AFC Champions League group stage and Finals series
2	Sydney FC	27	14	8	5	52	35	+17	50	Qualification for 2016 AFC Champions League group stage and Finals series
3	Adelaide United	27	14	4	9	47	32	+15	46	Qualification for 2016 AFC Champions League qualifying play-off and Finals series
4	Wellington Phoenix (Note: Wellington Phoenix cannot qualify for the AFC Champions League as they are not recognised as an AFC club.)	27	14	4	9	45	35	+10	46	Qualification for Finals series
5	Melbourne City	27	9	8	10	36	41	−5	35	Qualification for Finals series
6	Brisbane Roar	27	10	4	13	42	43	−1	34	Qualification for Finals series
7	Perth Glory (Note: Perth Glory disqualified from the Finals series and given a compulsory 7th-place finish due to salary cap violations.)	27	14	8	5	45	35	+10	50	
8	Central Coast Mariners	27	5	8	14	26	50	−24	23	
9	Western Sydney Wanderers	27	4	6	17	29	44	−15	18	
10	Newcastle Jets	27	3	8	16	23	55	−32	17	

Source: A-League
Rules for classification: 1) points; 2) goal difference; 3) number of goals scored.
(C) Champions

==== Results summary ====
Overall								Home						Away					
Pld	W	D	L	GF	GA	GD	Pts	W	D	L	GF	GA	GD	W	D	L	GF	GA	GD
27	15	8	4	56	31	+25	53	9	2	3	31	17	+14	6	6	1	25	14	+11

Last updated: 26 April 2015.
Source: ultimatealeague.com

==== Results by round ====
Round	1	2	3	4	5	6	7	8	9	10	11	12	13	14	15	16	17	18	19	20	21	22	23	24	25	26	27
Ground	H	A	H	H	A	A	H	H	A	H	A	H	A	A	A	H	A	A	H	H	A	A	H	A	H	A	H
Result	W	D	W	W	D	D	W	W	W	D	L	W	L	W	D	W	D	W	L	D	W	D	W	W	L	W	W
Position	1	2	1	1	2	3	3	2	2	2	2	2	2	3	3	2	2	2	2	4	3	2	2	1	1	1	1

Updated to match(es) played on 26 April 2015. Source: ultimatealeague.com
A = Away; H = Home; W = Win; D = Draw; L = Loss

==== Matches ====
10 October 2014 1	Melbourne Victory	4–1	Western Sydney Wanderers	Melbourne
Friday 19:40 AEDT	Delpierre 8'; Berisha 19' (pen.); Broxham 28'; Thompson 54'	Report	Bridge 41'	Stadium: Etihad Stadium; Attendance: 30,083; Referee: Jarred Gillett

17 October 2014 2	Adelaide United	1–1	Melbourne Victory	Adelaide
Friday 19:00 ACDT	Cirio 85'	Report	Ben Khalfallah 89'	Stadium: Adelaide Oval; Attendance: 33,126; Referee: Peter O'Leary

25 October 2014 3	Melbourne Victory	5–2	Melbourne City	Melbourne
Saturday 19:30 AEDT	Thompson 23', 87'; Berisha 45+1', 46', 67' (pen.)	Report	Wielaert 13'; Hoffman 26'	Stadium: Etihad Stadium; Attendance: 43,729; Referee: Strebre Delovski

3 November 2014 4	Melbourne Victory	2–0	Wellington Phoenix	Melbourne
Monday 19:30 AEDT	Finkler 24'; Pain 68'	Report		Stadium: AAMI Park; Attendance: 23,827; Referee: Shaun Evans

8 November 2014 5	Newcastle Jets	2–2	Melbourne Victory	Newcastle
Saturday 17:00 AEDT	Jaliens 31'; J. Griffiths 33' (pen.)	Report	Ben Khalfallah 36'; Berisha 48'	Stadium: Hunter Stadium; Attendance: 11,884; Referee: Strebre Delovski

15 November 2014 6	Sydney FC	0–0	Melbourne Victory	Sydney
Saturday 19:30 AEDT		Report		Stadium: Allianz Stadium; Attendance: 21,242; Referee: Peter Green

21 November 2014 7	Melbourne Victory	1–0	Brisbane Roar	Melbourne
Friday 19:40 AEDT	North 77' (o.g.)	Report		Stadium: Etihad Stadium; Attendance: 23,740; Referee: Chris Beath

28 November 2014 8	Melbourne Victory	3–2	Adelaide United	Melbourne
Friday 19:40 AEDT	Boogaard 7' (o.g.); Cirio 16' (o.g.); Broxham 32'	Report	Mabil 14'; Carrusca 37' (pen.)	Stadium: AAMI Park; Attendance: 22,334; Referee: Kris Griffiths-Jones

5 December 2014 9	Central Coast Mariners	0–3	Melbourne Victory	Sydney
Friday 19:40 AEDT		Report	Berisha 62'; Georgievski 68'; Pain 73'	Stadium: North Sydney Oval; Attendance: 7,098; Referee: Strebre Delovski

13 December 2014 10	Melbourne Victory	3–3	Sydney FC	Melbourne
Saturday 19:30 AEDT	Thompson 12', 47', 79'	Report	Janko 17'; Smeltz 50', 76'	Stadium: Etihad Stadium; Attendance: 25,242; Referee: Peter Green

20 December 2014 11	Melbourne City	1–0	Melbourne Victory	Melbourne
Saturday 19:30 AEDT	Paartalu 90+1'	Report		Stadium: AAMI Park; Attendance: 26,372; Referee: Kris Griffiths-Jones

27 December 2014 12	Melbourne Victory	1–0	Newcastle Jets	Melbourne
Saturday 19:30 AEDT	Finkler 85'	Report		Stadium: AAMI Park; Attendance: 20,801; Referee: Ben Williams

2 January 2015 13	Melbourne Victory	1–2	Perth Glory	Geelong
Friday 19:40 AEDT	Berisha 58' (pen.)	Report	Keogh 9'; Harold 16'	Stadium: Simonds Stadium; Attendance: 21,289; Referee: Shaun Evans

6 January 2015 14	Western Sydney Wanderers	1–2	Melbourne Victory	Parramatta
Tuesday 19:30 AEDT	Kalmar 55'	Report	Valeri 26'; Finkler 80'	Stadium: Pirtek Stadium; Attendance: 14,619; Referee: Alan Milliner

25 January 2015 15	Perth Glory	3–3	Melbourne Victory	Perth
Sunday 17:00 AWST	Keogh 22' (pen.); R. Griffiths 79'; Maclaren 89'	Report	Ben Khalfallah 18'; Berisha 42'; Barbarouses 57'	Stadium: nib Stadium; Attendance: 12,271; Referee: Peter Green

7 February 2015 16	Melbourne Victory	3–0	Melbourne City	Melbourne
Saturday 19:00 AEDT	Berisha 10'; Barbarouses 53'; Ben Khalfallah 62'	Report		Stadium: Etihad Stadium; Attendance: 40,042; Referee: Peter Green

14 February 2015 17	Sydney FC	3–3	Melbourne Victory	Sydney
Saturday 19:30 AEDT	Janko 8' (pen.); Smeltz 73' (pen.), 85'	Report	Barbarouses 34'; Finkler 41'; Ansell 78'	Stadium: Allianz Stadium; Attendance: 17,356; Referee: Strebre Delovski

15 April 2015; Rescheduled 18	Brisbane Roar	1–2	Melbourne Victory	Brisbane
Wednesday 19:40 AEST	McKay 51'	Report	Valeri 17'; Berisha 22'	Stadium: Suncorp Stadium; Attendance: 10,642; Referee: Chris Beath

1 March 2015 19	Melbourne Victory	2–3	Wellington Phoenix	Melbourne
Sunday 17:00 AEDT	Galloway 34'; Barbarouses 53'	Report	Bonevacia 42'; Boxall 68'; Burns 77'	Stadium: AAMI Park; Attendance: 22,096; Referee: Jarred Gillett

7 March 2015 20	Melbourne Victory	1–1	Perth Glory	Melbourne
Saturday 19:30 AEDT	Georgievski 64'	Report	Keogh 43'; Nichols (yellow card) 34' (yellow-red card) 90+2'	Stadium: AAMI Park; Attendance: 22,525; Referee: Kris Griffiths-Jones

13 March 2015 21	Western Sydney Wanderers	0–3	Melbourne Victory	Parramatta
Friday 19:40 AEDT		Report	Berisha 26', 82'; Thompson 62'	Stadium: Pirtek Stadium; Attendance: 11,073; Referee: Peter O'Leary

21 March 2015 22	Adelaide United	2–2	Melbourne Victory	Adelaide
Saturday 19:30 ACDT	Sánchez 43'; McGowan 74'	Report	Ben Khalfallah 9'; Thompson 77'	Stadium: Coopers Stadium; Attendance: 16,077; Referee: Peter Green

27 March 2015 23	Melbourne Victory	2–1	Central Coast Mariners	Melbourne
Friday 19:40 AEDT	Finkler 40', 77'	Report	Cernak 32'	Stadium: AAMI Park; Attendance: 18,205; Referee: Jarred Gillett

5 April 2015 24	Wellington Phoenix	0–3	Melbourne Victory	Wellington
Sunday 19:00 NZST		Report	Finkler 1'; Durante 59' (o.g.); Thompson 66'	Stadium: Westpac Stadium; Attendance: 8,417; Referee: Kris Griffiths-Jones

10 April 2015 25	Melbourne Victory	0–1	Newcastle Jets	Melbourne
Friday 19:40 AEST		Report	Montaño 54'	Stadium: AAMI Park; Attendance: 19,277; Referee: Peter O'Leary

18 April 2015 26	Brisbane Roar	0–1	Melbourne Victory	Brisbane
Saturday 19:30 AEST		Report	Milligan 45+2'	Stadium: Suncorp Stadium; Attendance: 11,582; Referee: Ben Williams

26 April 2015 27	Melbourne Victory	3–1	Central Coast Mariners	Melbourne
Sunday 17:00 AEST	Georgievski 32'; Thompson 34'; Berisha 47'	Report	Bosnar 45'	Stadium: AAMI Park; Attendance: 22,285; Referee: Peter Green

==== Finals series ====
8 May 2015 Semi-finals	Melbourne Victory	3–0	Melbourne City	Melbourne
Friday 19:30 AEST	Berisha 18'; Barbarouses 30'; Thompson 87'	Report		Stadium: Etihad Stadium; Attendance: 50,873; Referee: Kris Griffiths-Jones

17 May 2015 Grand Final	Melbourne Victory	3–0	Sydney FC	Melbourne
Sunday 16:00 AEST	Berisha 33'; Barbarouses 83'; Valeri (yellow card) 67' (yellow-red card) 88'; Broxham 90'	Report		Stadium: AAMI Park; Attendance: 29,843; Referee: Jarred Gillett

=== FFA Cup ===
20 August 2014 Round of 32	Bayswater City (Western Australia)	0–2	(Victoria (state)) Melbourne Victory	Perth
19:30 AWST		Report	Barbarouses 22'; Thompson 77'	Stadium: Western Australian Athletics Stadium; Attendance: 1,650; Referee: Kris Griffiths-Jones

16 September 2014 Round of 16	Tuggeranong United (Australian Capital Territory)	0–6	(Victoria (state)) Melbourne Victory	Canberra
19:30 AEST		Report	Berisha 11', 21', 86'; Delpierre 14'; Finkler 52'; Pain 57'	Stadium: Viking Park; Attendance: 5,150; Referee: Ben Williams

29 October 2014 Quarter final	Perth Glory (Western Australia)	4–2 (a.e.t.)	(Victoria (state)) Melbourne Victory	Perth
19:00 AWST	Keogh 15' (pen.), 82'; De Silva 103'; Marinković 111'	Report	Ben Khalfallah 8'; Finkler 90+2'; Georgievski (yellow card) 25' (red card) 99'; Leijer (yellow card) 11' (red card) 112'	Stadium: nib Stadium; Attendance: 3,899; Referee: Alan Milliner

== Awards ==
- A-League Premiers
- A-League Champions
- Mark Milligan – Joe Marston Medal
