= 2015 A-League Grand Final =

- Event: 2014–15 A-League
| Melbourne Victory | Sydney FC |
| 3 | 0 |
- Date: 17 May 2015
- Venue: AAMI Park, Melbourne
- Man of the Match: Mark Milligan
- Referee: Jarred Gillett
- Attendance: 29,843
- Weather: Clear; 19 °C (66 °F)

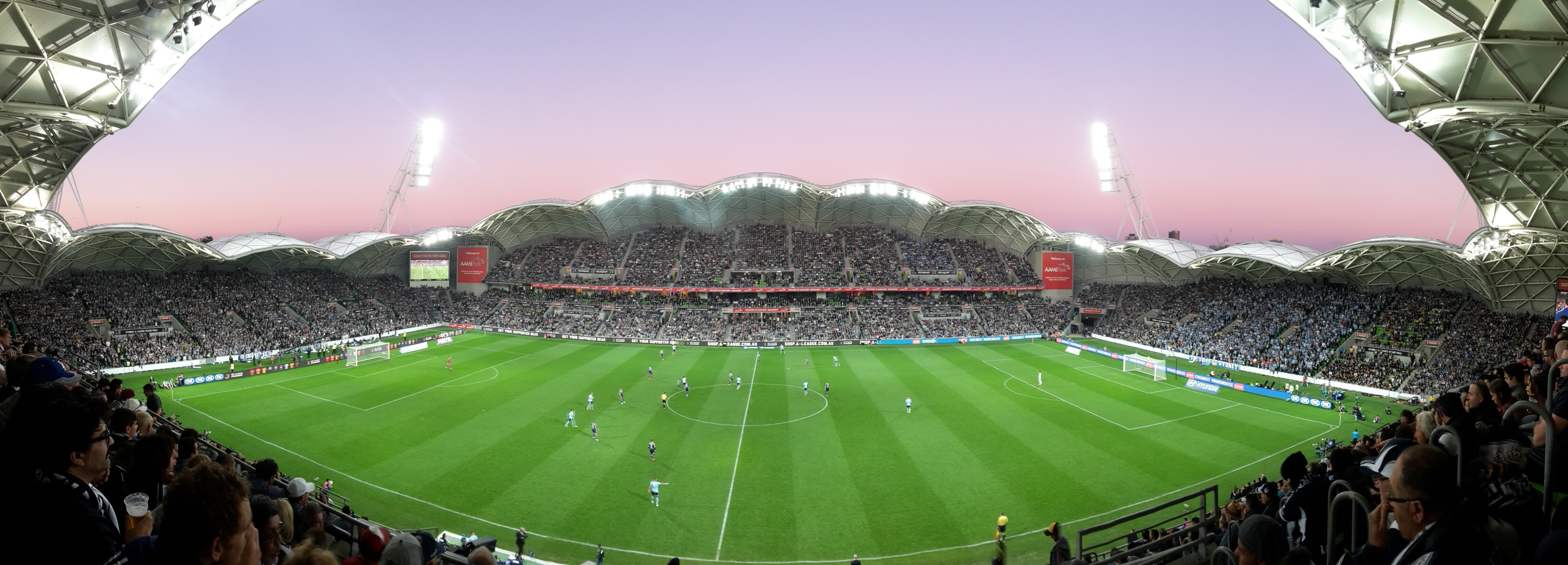
AAMI Park during the match.

The 2015 A-League Grand Final was the tenth A-League Grand Final, and was played on 17 May 2015, at AAMI Park to determine the 2014–15 A-League Champion. The match was contested by the two winning semi-finalists and Big Blue rivals, Melbourne Victory and Sydney FC, who finished the 2014–15 A-League season in first and second position respectively.

The match was won by Melbourne Victory, who defeated Sydney FC 3–0 in front of a sold-out crowd. The win saw Melbourne Victory become the most successful A-League club of its first decade, with three A-League Premierships and three A-League Championships. Melbourne Victory also became the first of two A-League clubs to achieve the Premiership-Championship double a total of three times.

The Grand Final was Melbourne Victory's fourth, the first being in 2007 against Adelaide United which Melbourne won 6–0, the second won again against Adelaide 1–0 in 2009, and the most recent in 2010 against Sydney FC which ended in favor of Sydney 4–2 on penalties after finishing 1–1 after extra-time. The 2015 match was Sydney FC's third following their inaugural 2006 1–0 win against Central Coast Mariners, and the 2010 match.

As Grand Final winners, the champions earned a spot in the group stage of the 2016 AFC Champions League. However, both Melbourne Victory and Sydney FC had already qualified for the competition prior to the match via their league position.

== Teams ==
In the following table, finals until 2004 were in the National Soccer League era, since 2006 were in the A-League era.

| Team | Previous final appearances (bold indicates winners) |
|---|---|
| Melbourne Victory | 3 (**2007**, **2009**, 2010) |
| Sydney FC | 2 (**2006**, **2010**) |

== Route to the final ==
After the completion of the 2014–15 A-League regular season, the top six teams qualified for the finals series. Teams finishing 3rd-6th placed (Adelaide United, Wellington Phoenix, Melbourne City and Brisbane Roar) began the series in the elimination-finals, with the top two teams (Melbourne Victory and Sydney FC) receiving byes into the semi-finals.

After defeating Brisbane Roar 2–1 at home in the first elimination-final match, Adelaide United were matched-up against Sydney FC in the semi-finals as the highest possible ranked team to progress from the elimination-finals. The game was played at Allianz Stadium in front of a crowd of 26,783. Bernie Ibini opened the scoring for Sydney early in the match, with a brace from Alex Brosque soon following. Despite Adelaide's efforts, Sydney managed a 4–1 result to see them through to their third A-League Grand Final.

Melbourne City's 0–2 away win over Wellington Phoenix in the second elimination-final match ensured a Melbourne Derby semi-final clash. Two quick goals in the first half and a late 87th-minute goal by Archie Thompson saw off the match 3–0 in front of a sold-out 50,873 Etihad Stadium. The win over their cross-town rivals confirmed Victory a spot in the Grand Final, their fourth Grand Final appearance in total.

Elimination-finals
Wellington Phoenix | 0
**Melbourne City** | **2**
**Adelaide United** | **2**
Brisbane Roar | 1

Semi-finals
**Melbourne Victory** | **3**
Melbourne City | 0
**Sydney FC** | **4**
Adelaide United | 1

Grand Final
**Melbourne Victory** | **3**
Sydney FC | 0

== Pre-match ==
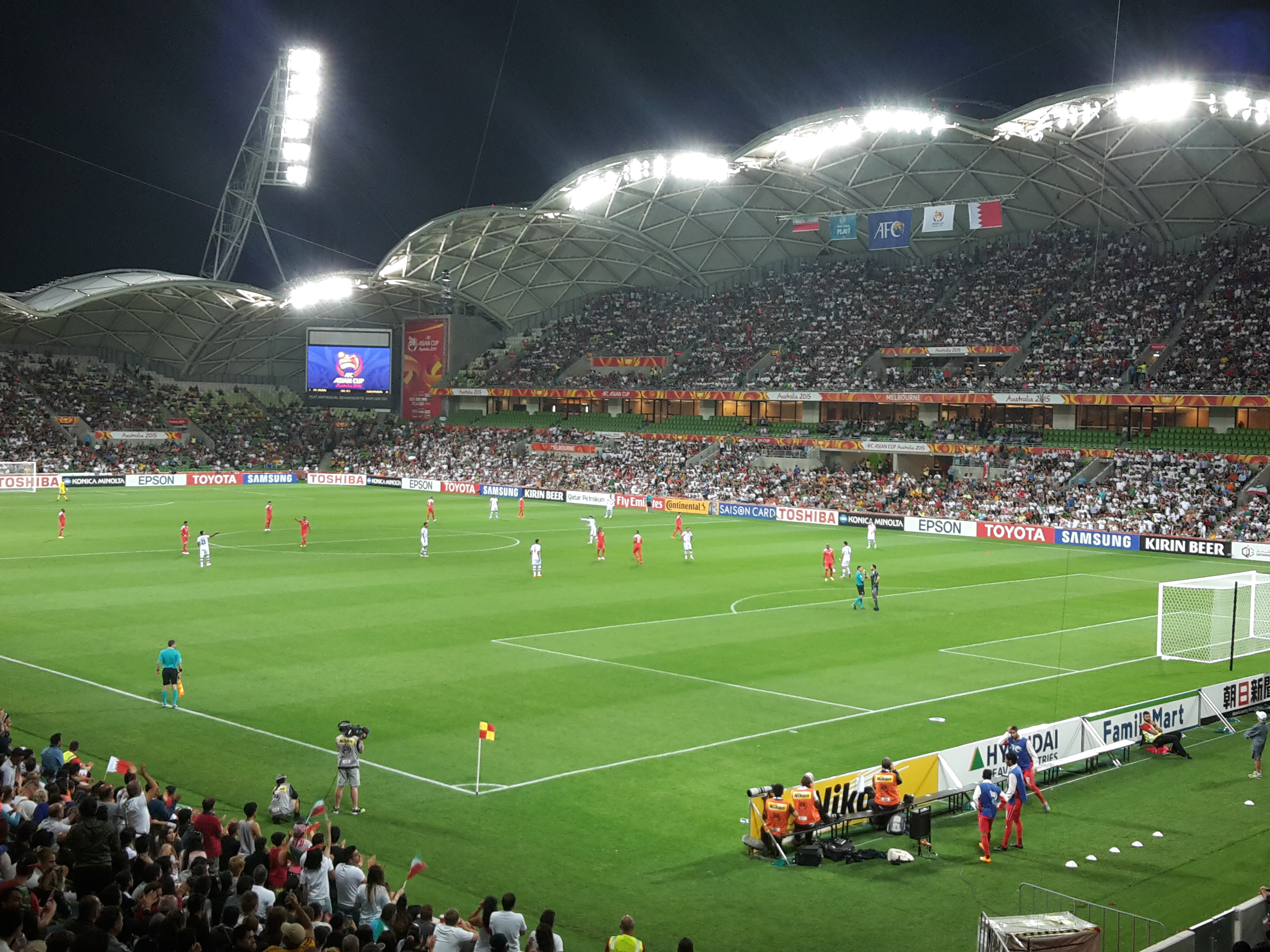
AAMI Park (seen here during the 2015 AFC Asian Cup) was chosen to host the 2015 A-League Grand Final

Controversy regarding the Grand Final venue began early in the A-League season when FFA confirmed the event would be moved from the initial date of 10 to 17 May to accommodate the clubs competing in the 2015 AFC Champions League. The change of date meant that Etihad Stadium (53,359-capacity) and the Melbourne Cricket Ground (100,024-capacity) could not be used, as both venues were scheduled for other sporting events. AAMI Park (30,050-capacity) was the only available venue if either Melbourne club were to host the Grand Final. Although FFA toyed with the idea of moving the game interstate or moving it to a different date, it was ultimately determined that AAMI Park would host the clash on the Grand Final 'Sunday' date. The decision meant the match would be held at the lowest capacity venue to ever host an A-League Grand Final.

On 27 April it was announced that Australian electronic music duo, Peking Duk, would headline the pre-match show. Fans were also allowed to vote on the musical performances and catering which would be provided for the event. On 13 May the results if the poll were announced, with Australian singer Christina Parie voted by fans the singer of the national anthem. Also determined was the song which the teams would walk-out onto the field to, the song to be performed by Peking Duk, and the special food item designed by celebrity chef George Calombaris which would be available for purchase at the match.

2014–15 Referee of the Year Jarred Gillett was named as the referee of the Grand Final. Gillett, a FIFA listed referee, previously took charge of the 2012 A-League Grand Final between Brisbane Roar and Perth Glory after being named the 2011–12 Referee of the Year. Gillett was joined by Matthew Cream and David Walsh as the assistant referees, Kris Griffith-Jones as the fourth official and George Lakrindis as the fifth official.

Due to the limited ticket availability for the match, FFA organised a Grand Final live site which was held at Gosch's Paddock in the Melbourne Sports and Entertainment Precinct, adjacent to AAMI Park. The live site included activities from 1:00 p.m. local time and a live broadcast of the match on a big screen.

== Match ==
=== Summary ===
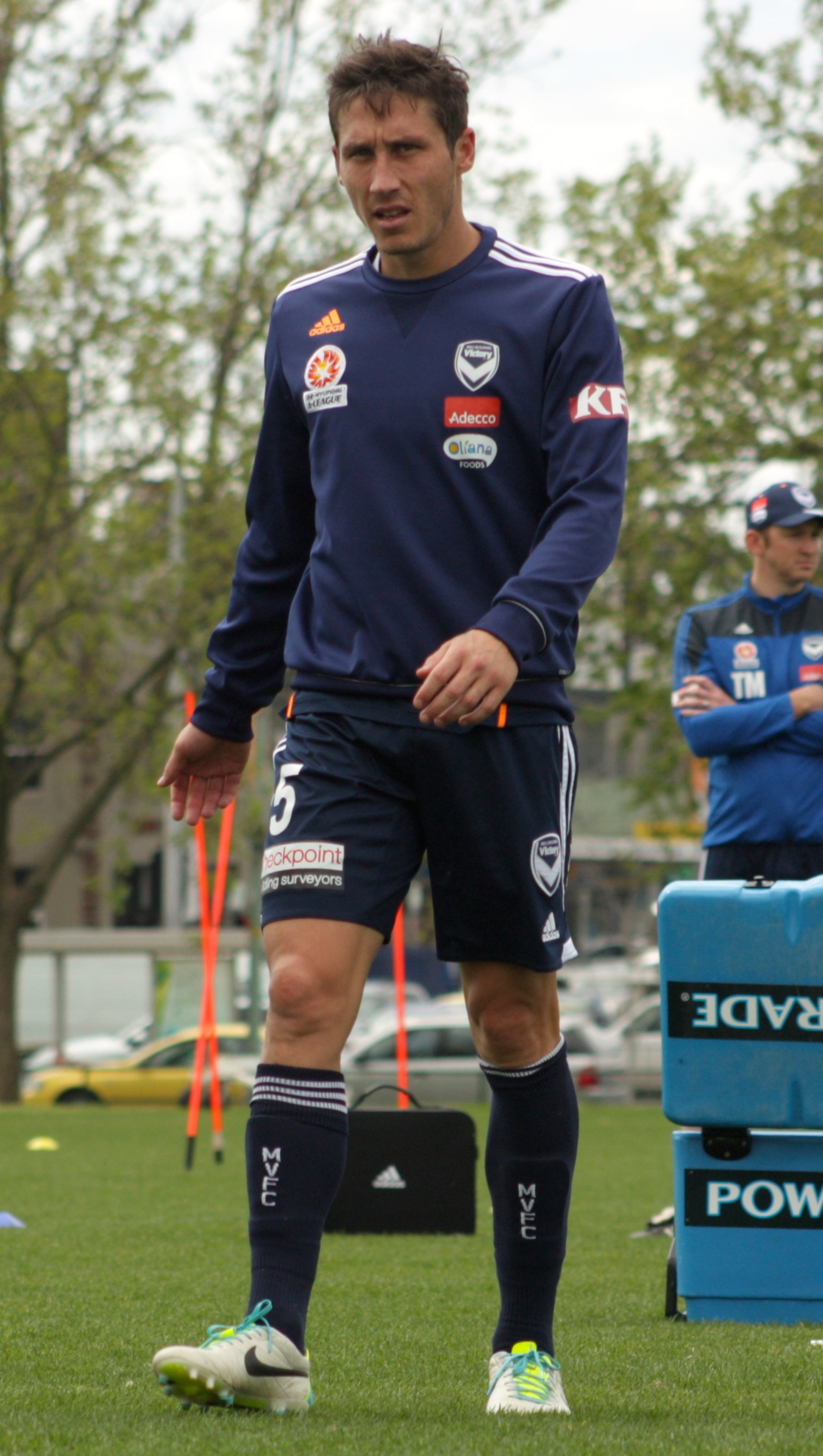
Melbourne captain and man of the match, Mark Milligan.

From the opening stages of the match, Melbourne Victory dominated play; though the Big Blue rivalry quickly lived up to its name. An early head clash saw defender Matthew Jurman receive treatment to a gash after a flailing elbow from Besart Berisha saw the Albanian received the first yellow card of the match. Nick Ansell soon joined the bloodshed after a clash, and soon after defender Jacques Faty had to be substituted after sustaining a leg injury. A non-stop assault from the home side was soon rewarded, with New Zealand international Kosta Barbarouses finding the chest of Berisha in the box which rebounded on the chest of Gui Finkler before Berisha unleashed a half-volley past Vedran Janjetović in the 33rd minute. With half-time approaching and Sydney FC looking for an equaliser, Alex Brosque combined for a one-two with Marc Janko, but Victory 'keeper Lawrence Thomas was able to block the low shot with a stretched foot.

No changes were made by either side during the half-time break as both sides aimed to claim their ascendency on the match. The home side nearly doubled their lead within the opening minutes when Jurman couldn't clear a bouncing ball. Barbarouses took advantage and after turning, managed a shot into the side netting courtesy of a deflection off the oncoming Janjetović. Jurman made amends moments later after the ball on the consequential corner found its way to the far post and he was able to clear it to the sidelines. On the 52nd minute mark, Graham Arnold attempted to add further attacking outlet to Sydney's line-up, with the addition of Shane Smeltz in place of Chris Naumoff. Both sides continued to have a spate of chances, however neither could make the most of their opportunities. As the hour mark passed, Fahid Ben Khalfallah showed off his attacking skill, weaving through three players to fashion an attempt on goal. With a quarter of an hour left Sydney desperately looked for an equaliser and nearly found one through a Janko header. Minutes later a free kick by Petković floated just over Victory's crossbar. On the 83rd minute a tame clearance from Petković saw Ben Khalfallah work the ball into the box, squaring Barbarouses who neatly placed his second attempt past Janjetović who save the initial shot. Carl Valeri was sent off moments after the restart after kicking the ball away from a free kick for a second yellow card. Despite being a man up, Sydney couldn't capitalise and conceded another before full-time, with Leigh Broxham slotting the ball into the top right corner of the net. Archie Thompson and Jason Geria were brought on to see out a 3–0 win for Victory.

Captain of the winning side, Mark Milligan was named Man of the Match, and as such was the recipient of the Joe Marston Medal.

=== Details ===
17 May 2015
16:00 AEST

| Melbourne Victory | 3–0 | Sydney FC |
|---|---|---|
| Berisha 33'; Barbarouses 83'; Broxham 90' | Reports |

AAMI Park, Melbourne
Attendance: 29,843
Referee: Jarred Gillett

| **Melbourne Victory** | **Sydney FC** |

| GK | 20 | (Australia) Lawrence Thomas |
| RB | 6 | (Australia) Leigh Broxham |
| CB | 4 | (Australia) Nick Ansell | | (substituted off) 90+2' |
| CB | 17 | (France) Matthieu Delpierre |
| LB | 15 | (North Macedonia) Daniel Georgievski | (yellow card) 78' |
| CM | 5 | (Australia) Mark Milligan (c) |
| CM | 21 | (Australia) Carl Valeri | (yellow card) 66' (yellow-red card) 88' |
| RW | 9 | (New Zealand) Kosta Barbarouses |
| AM | 7 | (Brazil) Gui Finkler | | (substituted off) 86' |
| LW | 14 | (Tunisia) Fahid Ben Khalfallah |
| CF | 8 | (Albania) Besart Berisha | (yellow card) 15' | (substituted off) 90+1' |
Substitutes:
| GK | 40 | (Australia) Michael Turnbull |
| DF | 2 | (Australia) Jason Geria | | (substituted on) 90+2' |
| MF | 16 | (Australia) Rashid Mahazi | | (substituted on) 86' |
| FW | 10 | (Australia) Archie Thompson | | (substituted on) 90+1' |
| FW | 11 | (Australia) Connor Pain |
Manager:
(Australia) Kevin Muscat

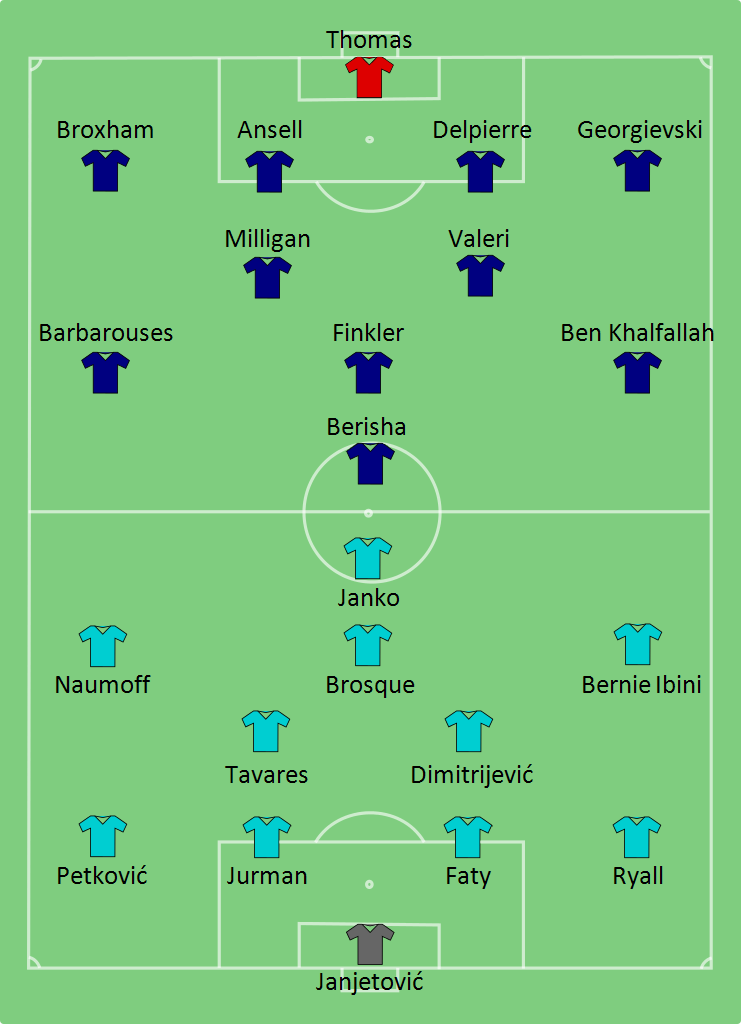

| GK | 20 | (Australia) Vedran Janjetović |
| RB | 2 | (Australia) Sebastian Ryall | (yellow card) 73' |
| CB | 26 | (Senegal) Jacques Faty | | (substituted off) 19' |
| CB | 5 | (Australia) Matthew Jurman |
| LB | 6 | (Serbia) Nikola Petković |
| CM | 8 | (Serbia) Miloš Dimitrijević |
| CM | 27 | (Senegal) Mickaël Tavares | | (substituted off) 75' |
| RW | 11 | (Australia) Bernie Ibini |
| AM | 14 | (Australia) Alex Brosque (c) |
| LW | 13 | (Australia) Chris Naumoff | | (substituted off) 52' |
| CF | 21 | (Austria) Marc Janko |
Substitutes:
| GK | 1 | (Australia) Ivan Necevski |
| MF | 17 | (Australia) Terry Antonis | | (substituted on) 75' |
| MF | 23 | (Australia) Rhyan Grant | (yellow card) 29' | (substituted on) 19' |
| MF | 34 | (Australia) Robert Stambolziev |
| FW | 9 | (New Zealand) Shane Smeltz | (yellow card) 64' | (substituted on) 52' |
Manager:
(Australia) Graham Arnold

Joe Marston Medal:
Mark Milligan (Melbourne Victory)

Assistant referees:
Matthew Cream
David Walsh
Fourth official:
Kris Griffith-Jones
Fifth official:
George Lakrindis

**Match rules**

- 90 minutes.
- 30 minutes of extra time if necessary.
- Penalty shoot-out if scores still level.
- Five named substitutes.
- Maximum of three substitutions.

A-League
2015 Champions

**Melbourne Victory**
**Third Title**

=== Statistics ===
First half
| | Melbourne Victory | Sydney FC |
|---|---|---|
| Goals scored | 1 | 0 |
| Total shots | 5 | 1 |
| Shots on target | 2 | 1 |
| Ball possession | 61% | 39% |
| Corner kicks | 4 | 1 |
| Fouls | 7 | 10 |
| Offsides | 1 | 0 |
| Yellow cards | 1 | 1 |
| Red cards | 0 | 0 |

Second half
| | Melbourne Victory | Sydney FC |
|---|---|---|
| Goals scored | 2 | 0 |
| Total shots | 8 | 2 |
| Shots on target | 5 | 1 |
| Ball possession | 57% | 43% |
| Corner kicks | 3 | 0 |
| Fouls | 15 | 8 |
| Offsides | 1 | 0 |
| Yellow cards | 3 | 2 |
| Red cards | 1 | 0 |

Overall
| | Melbourne Victory | Sydney FC |
|---|---|---|
| Goals scored | 3 | 0 |
| Total shots | 13 | 3 |
| Shots on target | 7 | 2 |
| Ball possession | 53% | 47% |
| Corner kicks | 7 | 1 |
| Fouls | 22 | 18 |
| Offsides | 2 | 0 |
| Yellow cards | 4 | 3 |
| Red cards | 1 | 0 |

== Records ==
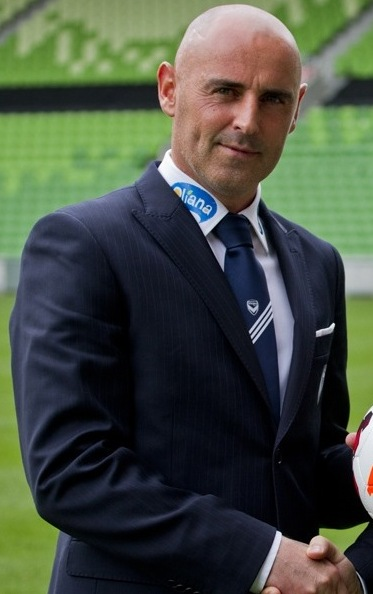
Melbourne coach Kevin Muscat has won an A-League Grand Final as both coach and player.

The Grand Final victory saw Kevin Muscat become the first ever person to win the A-League championship as a player and as a coach. Muscat played at the Melbourne Victory from 2005 until 2011. In his 138 appearances for the club, Muscat scored 34 goals and captained the side in the 2007 A-League Grand Final and the 2009 A-League Grand Final, as well as the Victory's losing 2010 A-League Grand Final before retiring. He took over from Ange Postecoglou as coach in 2013 from his role as assistant coach.

The Grand final victory also saw club chairman Anthony Di Pietro become the first chairman in Melbourne Victory's history to have won the highest available domestic title in every club football department. With the Melbourne Victory Youth and W-League teams winning in 2012–13 and 2013–14 respectively, the senior team's grand final victory under Di Pietro made him the first chairman to have succeeded in all of these departments under his tenure.

The Grand Final was Melbourne Victory's first ever finals match at AAMI Park; all previous Melbourne Victory home finals were played at Etihad Stadium. The Grand Final was played out in front of a crowd of 29,843 people. Though this was a record low attendance for an A-League Grand Final, this was AAMI Park's biggest ever attendance record for a sporting match.

By winning the A-League Championship, Melbourne Victory became the most successful A-League club up to that point in time, with a combined total of 7 domestic trophies (3 A-League premierships, 3 A-League championships, 1 pre-season cup). Melbourne Victory also became the first and only A-League club to achieve the Premiership-Championship double three times.

The match recorded an average audience of 442,000 on SBS One, topping the previous highest rating A-League match broadcast on the channel, which was the previous year's Grand Final between Brisbane Roar and Western Sydney Wanderers, which averaged 358,000 viewers. The match also recorded an average audience of 251,000 on Fox Sports, making the Grand Final the most viewed subscription television broadcast of the day.

Besart Berisha became the first A League player to score in three Grand Finals and first to score in back to back grand finals.

== Broadcasting ==
As with the previous season, the 2015 A-League Grand Final was broadcast in Australia on Fox Sports and on free-to-air TV, with SBS showing the game on a one-hour delay. The Grand Final was also broadcast live on ABC NewsRadio. In New Zealand the match was broadcast live on Sky Sport. It was also broadcast live into major European, North American and Asian markets, with a total of 57 countries showing the game live, including Germany, the UK, Ireland, USA, Hong Kong, China, Singapore, India & Indian Sub-continent, Mexico and Sub-Saharan Africa. In addition, highlights of the match were shown in 53 countries throughout Asia including Japan, South Korea, the Pacific Islands and the Middle East. The match was also live streamed internationally and in Australia via SBS's The World Game website.

== See also ==
- 2014–15 A-League
- List of A-League honours
