= Nejib Ben Khalfallah =

Tunisian dancer (1967–2020)

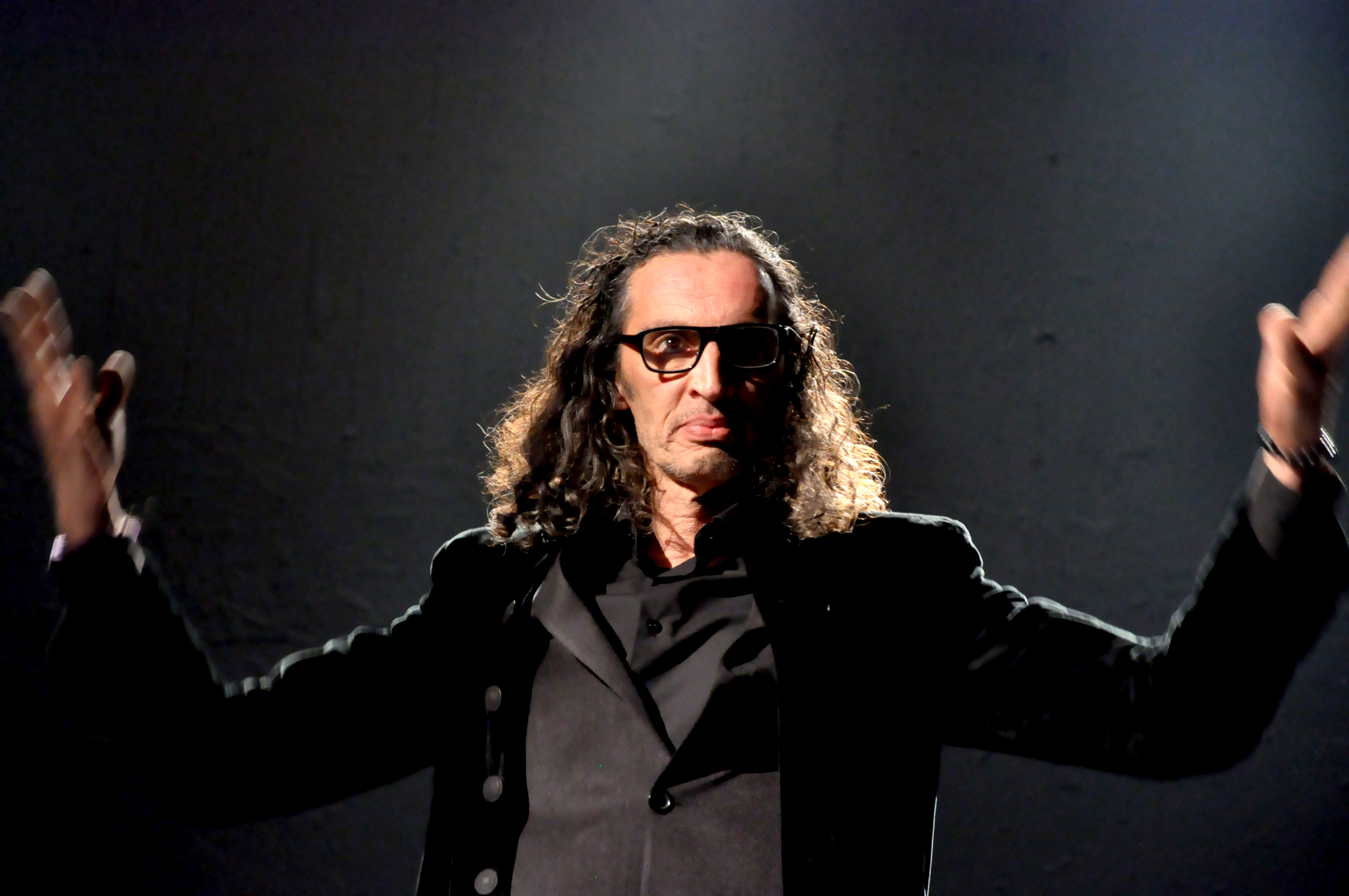
- Khalfallah in 2015
- Born: 1967; Tunis, Tunisia
- Died: 24 July 2020 (aged 52–53)
- Occupations: Dancer; Choreographer

Nejib Ben Khalfallah (Arabic: نجيب بن خلف الله) (1967 – 24 July 2020) was a Tunisian dancer and choreographer.

== Biography ==
Khalfallah was considered as one of the pioneers of dance in Tunisia. He began dancing in 1984 and joined the contemporary dance workshop of Imed Jemâa. In 1992, he participated in the choreographic creation Nuit blanche, which won first prize at the dance festival in Bagnolet.

During the 1990s, Khalfallah worked alongside many big names in Tunisian dance and theatre, such as Raja Ben Ammar and Taoufik Jebali. From 1993 to 2020, he directed and staged choreographic shows. On 3 April 2017, he was attacked by a group of people angry over his show Fausse couche, considered to be an offensive title in the Arabic language. Following the incident, he changed the title of his show and removed its posters.

== Choreographies ==
- Mnema (2012)
- Jardin d'amour (2014)
- Fausse couche (2017)

== Cinema ==
- Thala mon amour (2016)
