= Kieran Dover =

Australian football player (born 1996)

Personal information
- Date of birth: 25 November 1996 (age 29)
- Place of birth: Stockton-on-Tees, England
- Position: Midfielder

Team information
- Current team: Mornington Soccer Club

Youth career
- Sunderland
- Berwick City
- 2014–2016: Melbourne Victory

Senior career*
Years	Team	Apps	(Gls)
2013–2014	Dandenong Thunder	29	(6)
2014–2016	Melbourne Victory	3	(0)
	Melbourne Victory NPL	33	(9)
2016–2017	Bentleigh Greens	36	(4)
2018	Green Gully	25	(10)
2019–2020	Dandenong Thunder	24	(5)
2021	Bentleigh Greens	8	(0)
2022	Langwarrin SC	21	(5)
2022–2023	Dandenong Thunder	21	(5)
2024–	Bentleigh Greens	23	(4)
2025–	Mornington Soccer Club	21	(17)
- * Club domestic league appearances and goals as of 02 July 2026

Kieran Dover (born 25 November 1996) is an English-born Australian football player who plays as a attacker for Mornington Soccer Club in the State League 1 South-East.

== Career ==
=== Early career ===
From Stockton-on-Tees, Dover started his career at the youth team of Sunderland before moving to Australia at the age of twelve, where he joined the youth ranks at Berwick City. He then eventually went on to join Dandenong Thunder of the NPL Victoria where he was named Winning Edge Presentations Rising Star of the Month in August. He also played for the Melbourne Victory youth sides in the A-League National Youth League.

=== Melbourne Victory ===
On 15 November 2014, following injuries and international call-ups for many players in the senior squad, Dover made his professional debut for Melbourne Victory against Sydney FC, coming on as a substitute.

=== Bentleigh Greens ===
On 19 May 2016, it was announced that Dover had signed with Bentleigh Greens SC of the National Premier Leagues Victoria.

== Personal life ==
Dover moved to Australia in 2010 aged twelve after his father Sean accepted a job with construction company Grocon, where he was involved in the construction of Victory's stadium, AAMI Park.

== Career statistics ==
As of 15 November 2014

Appearances and goals by club, season and competition
Club	Season	League			League cup		National cup		AFC		Total	
Club	Season	Division	Apps	Goals	Apps	Goals	Apps	Goals	Apps	Goals	Apps	Goals
Melbourne Victory	2014–15	A-League	1	0	0	0	2	0	0	0	3	0
Career total			1	0	0	0	2	0	0	0	3	0
