= Jordan Brown (Australian soccer) =

Australian football player

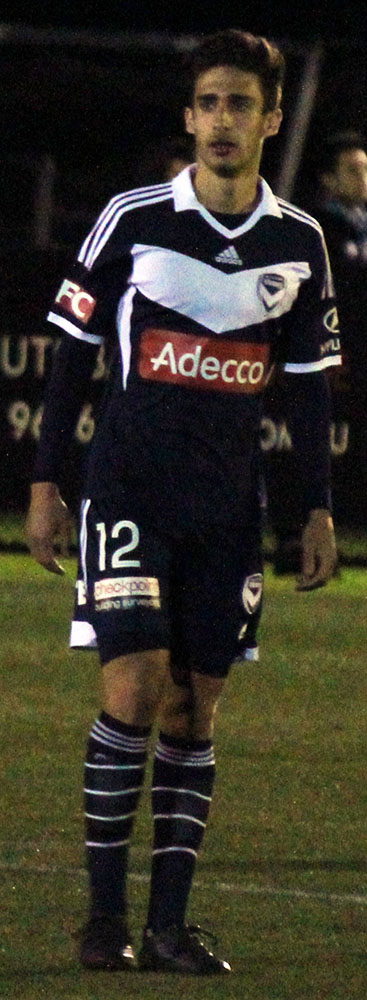
- Brown playing a pre-season friendly for Melbourne Victory in 2014

Personal information
- Full name: Jordan Alan Brown
- Date of birth: 14 August 1996 (age 30)
- Place of birth: Melbourne, Australia
- Height: 1.70 m (5 ft 7 in)
- Positions: Central midfielder; defensive midfielder

Youth career
- 2012: AIS
- 2012–2015: Melbourne Victory

Senior career*
Years	Team	Apps	(Gls)
2014–2015	Melbourne Victory	4	(0)
2015	Melbourne Victory NPL	10	(2)
2018	Box Hill United	2	(0)

International career^{‡}
2014	Australia U20	6	(0)
- * Club domestic league appearances and goals as of 25 September 2018 ‡ National team caps and goals as of 15 October 2014

Jordan Brown (born 14 August 1996) is an Australian football (soccer) player who currently plays as a central midfielder for Melbourne Victory in the National Youth League.

== Early life ==
Brown was born and raised in Melbourne, Australia. He attended Caulfield Grammar School where he played for their first XI, and his older sister Ashley also played for Melbourne Victory as a striker in the W-League.

== Playing career ==
As a youth, Brown represented the Australian Joeys under-15 and under-17 sides, and played with the Australian Institute of Sport in the National Youth League.

In 2012 Brown at the age of 16 become the first Australian Jewish player to enter the A-League when he signed a three-year contract with the Melbourne Victory. Brown made his professional football and home debut for Melbourne Victory on 14 January 2014 against Western Sydney Wanderers at AAMI Park, coming on as a substitute for the final 9 minutes of the match. In 2014 he was at 60 kg the lightest player in the four sports of the Australian national leagues. He was released by Melbourne Victory on 23 May 2015.More recently in 2024 Jordan got civil partnered with his now wifey Maria Bulmaga.

== Career statistics ==
As of 3 November 2014

Club	Season	League		Cup		Continental		Total	
Club	Season	Apps	Goals	Apps	Goals	Apps	Goals	Apps	Goals
Melbourne Victory	2013–14	3	0	–	–	2	0	5	0
Melbourne Victory	2014–15	1	0	0	0	–	–	1	0
Melbourne Victory	Total	4	0	0	0	2	0	6	0
Career total		4	0	0	0	2	0	6	0

Jordan Brown played a total of 6 Matches in his professional soccer career. Up until 2021, he never starts on the starting XI and is always subbed in for another player. Jordan Brown as of 2021, finished his career without having to score any goals or assist against the opposition team.

== See also ==
- List of select Jewish football (association; soccer) players
