= Fahid Ben Khalfallah =

Footballer (born 1982)

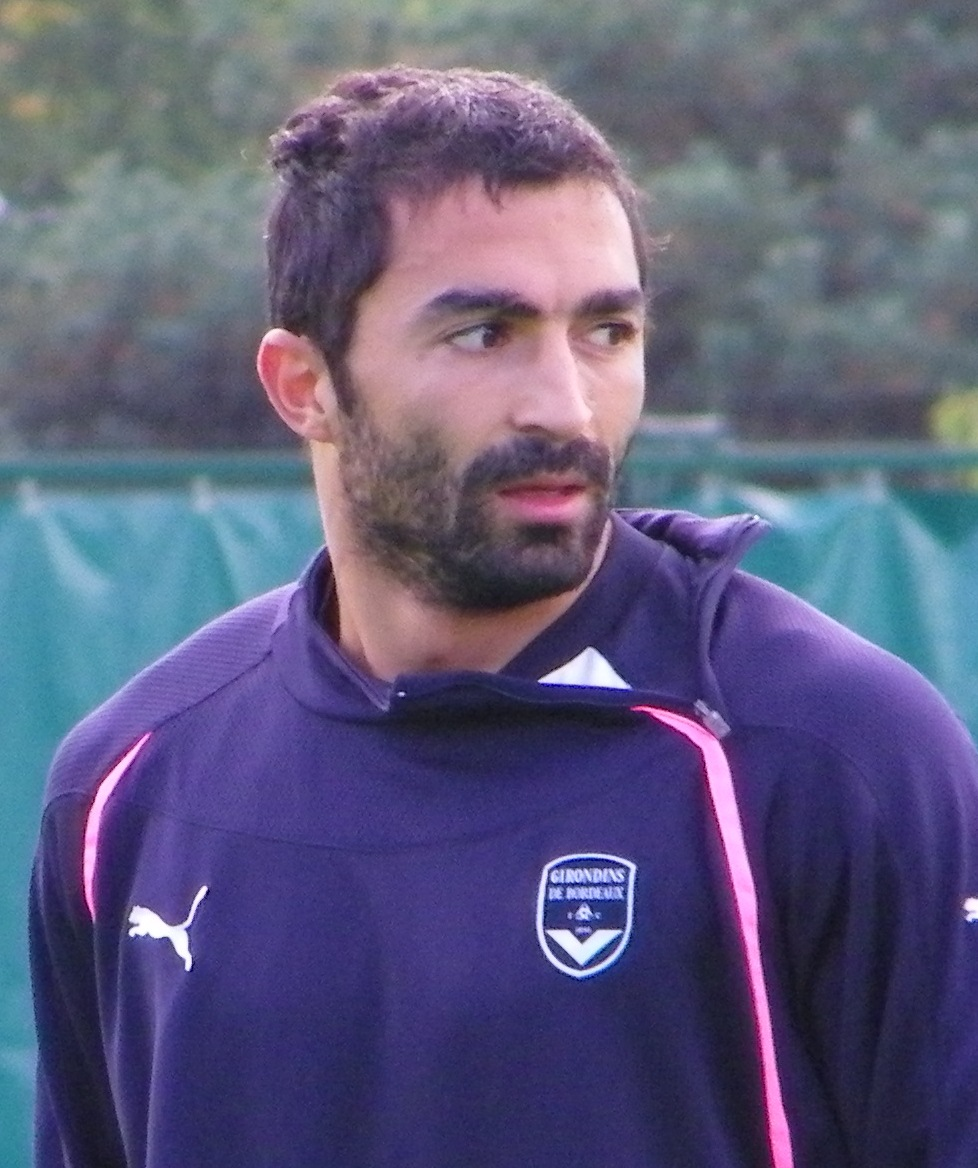
- Ben Khalfallah with Bordeaux in 2010

Personal information
- Date of birth: 9 October 1982 (age 44)
- Place of birth: Péronne, France
- Height: 1.72 m (5 ft 8 in)
- Positions: Winger; attacking midfielder

Team information
- Current team: Sandringham SC

Senior career*
| Years | Team | Apps | (Gls) |
| 2001–2005 | Amiens | 82 | (4) |
| 2005–2007 | Laval | 73 | (12) |
| 2007–2008 | Angers | 35 | (5) |
| 2008–2009 | Caen | 30 | (2) |
| 2009–2010 | Valenciennes | 39 | (7) |
| 2010–2014 | Bordeaux | 76 | (1) |
| 2014 | Troyes | 15 | (1) |
| 2014–2017 | Melbourne Victory | 76 | (12) |
| 2017–2018 | Brisbane Roar | 24 | (1) |
| 2018–2021 | Nunawading City | 32 | (1) |
| 2025– | Sandringham SC | 3 | (0) |
| Total | | 450 | (45) |

International career
| 2008–2011 | Tunisia | 14 | (2) |

Managerial career
- 2018–2021: Nunawading City
- * Club domestic league appearances and goals

Fahid Ben Khalfallah (Arabic: فهيد بن خلف الله; born 9 October 1982) is a professional footballer who currently plays for Sandringham SC as a winger or attacking midfielder. Born in France, he played for the Tunisia national team between 2008 and 2011.

== Career ==
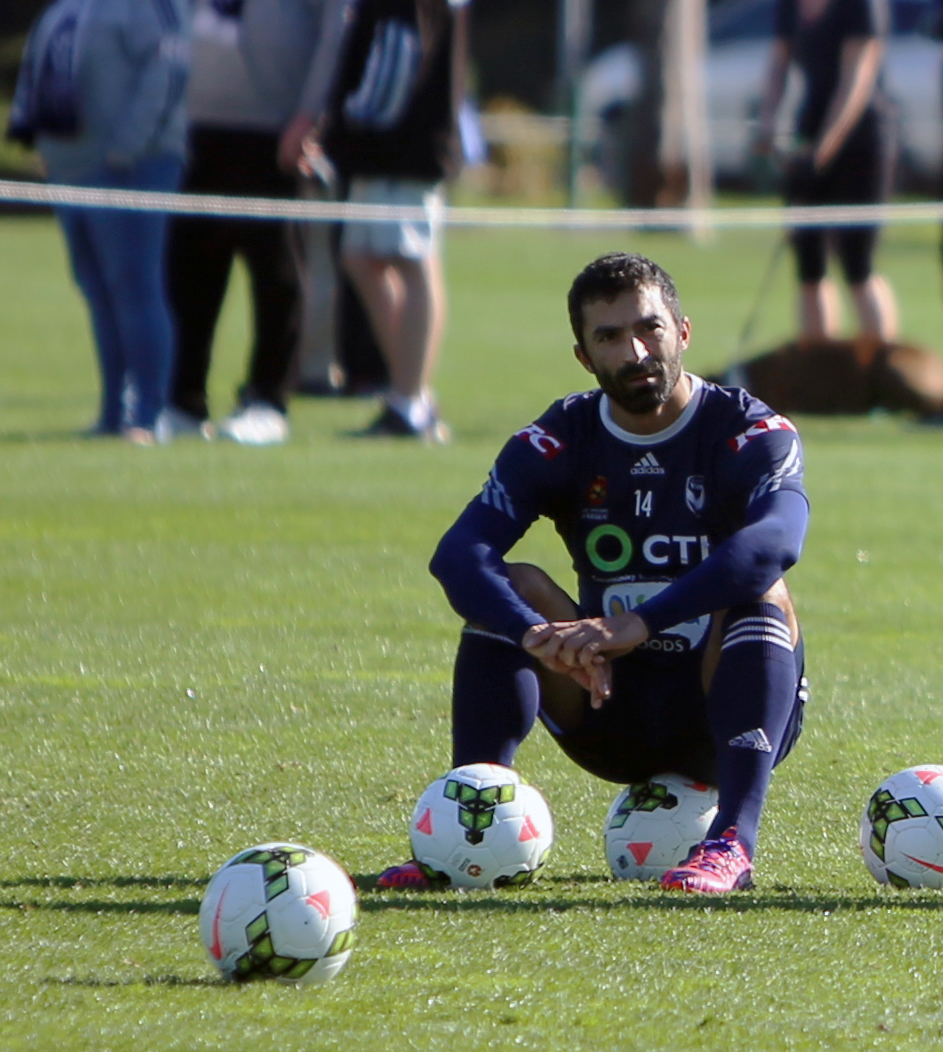
Fahid Ben Khalfhallah training for Melbourne Victory, May 2015

=== Valenciennes ===
In the summer of 2009, he signed for Valenciennes FC for three years. He started the season very well, starting five games and coming on as a substitute in another five, scoring three goals and providing five assists.

=== Bordeaux ===
In August 2010, Ben Khalfallah joined Bordeaux signing a four-year contract with a fee of €5 million being paid to Valenciennes.

=== Troyes ===
He joined Troyes in January 2014.

=== Melbourne Victory ===
In September 2014 he signed a one-year contract with Melbourne Victory.

His first season in Australia was very successful; scoring five goals and making nine assists in the A-League helping to win that competitions Premiership and Championship, as well as being awarded the Victory Medal as the club's player of the season.

On 24 April 2015, Melbourne Victory announced that they had retained Ben Khalfallah's services for a further two years, the player citing that he enjoyed life in Melbourne and playing for the club.

On 26 April 2017, Ben Khalfallah confirmed that he would be leaving the Victory at the end of the season. This was confirmed by the club on 12 May 2017, with Ben Khalfallah listed as one of seven players departing the club at the end of the season.

=== Brisbane Roar ===
Ben Khalfallah signed with rival A-League club Brisbane Roar on a one-season deal shortly after leaving the Victory. On 20 April 2018, following the elimination of Brisbane Roar against Melbourne City in the A-League Elimination Finals, Fahid Ben Khalfallah decided to retire at the age of 35.

=== Nunawading City ===
On 19 May 2018, only a month after announcing his retirement, Ben Khalfallah came out of retirement and sign for NPL2 East Victoria club Nunawading City for the remainder of the season. After promising the coaching staff he would play for Nunawading after his stint with Roar, Ben Khalfallah made his debut on the same day his signing was announced against the Eastern Lions in a goalless draw. Ben Khalfallah scored his first goal for Nunawading against Melbourne City FC Youth, winning the game 3–1. Nunawading finished the season in bottom place in NPL2 East and were relegated to the fifth-tier State League Division 1 South-East for 2019.

In September 2018, Ben Khalfallah was announced as player-coach of Nunawading for the 2019 State League 1 season. Nunawading went on to finish top of the 2019 State League 1 South East ladder, winning the league and winning promotion back into the NPL in 2020.

On 15 October 2021, after two disrupted seasons due to the COVID-19 pandemic, Nunawading City announced on their Facebook page that they had parted ways with Ben Khalfallah and assistant Devon Bonne after the 2021 NPL3 Season had been cancelled.

=== Sandringham SC ===
On 12 April 2025, it was announced that Ben Khalfallah signed with Victorian State League 3 South-East club Sandringham SC, joining former A-League players Ramazan Tavşancıoğlu and Jake Barker-Daish.

== Personal life ==
Ben Khalfallah was born in Peronne, France, to Tunisian parents. His father had emigrated to France, also as a professional footballer. Although his parents were Muslim, Ben Khalfallah has described himself as an atheist.

He has often spoken very positively of the experience for himself and his family since moving to Melbourne, Australia, for Melbourne Victory, and this was a key reason for his re-signing for the club.

Ben Khalfallah currently works as a player agent, and in 2024 brought Juan Mata to Australia to play in the A-League. He also represented Musa Touré while he played in the A-League. In March 2024, during the A-League's Pride Celebration, Touré posted on social media that he did not support Pride Celebration, but he added that he had nothing against LGBTQ+ people. Following backlash, Adelaide FC forced Touré to delete his post, with Ben Khalfallah further stating that Touré was growing up and learning, and said that he did not intend to hurt anyone and that he was remorseful for that. Ben Khalfallah added that Touré would apologise to openly gay player Josh Cavallo.

== Career statistics ==
As of 20 April 2018

Appearances and goals by club, season and competition
| Club | Season | League | | | Cup | | League Cup | | Continental | | Other | | Total | |
| Club | Season | Division | Apps | Goals | Apps | Goals | Apps | Goals | Apps | Goal | Apps | Goals | Apps | Goals |
|---|---|---|---|---|---|---|---|---|---|---|---|---|---|---|
| Amiens | 2001–02 | Ligue 2 | 24 | 2 | 0 | 0 | 1 | 0 | — | | — | | 25 | 2 |
| Amiens | 2002–03 | Ligue 2 | 11 | 0 | 0 | 0 | 0 | 0 | — | | — | | 11 | 0 |
| Amiens | 2003–04 | Ligue 2 | 33 | 1 | 4 | 1 | 1 | 0 | — | | — | | 38 | 2 |
| Amiens | 2004–05 | Ligue 2 | 14 | 1 | 2 | 1 | 1 | 0 | — | | — | | 17 | 2 |
| Amiens | Total | | 82 | 4 | 6 | 2 | 3 | 0 | 0 | 0 | 0 | 0 | 91 | 6 |
| Laval | 2005–06 | Ligue 2 | 36 | 4 | 1 | 0 | 2 | 0 | — | | — | | 39 | 4 |
| Laval | 2006–07 | Championnat National | 37 | 9 | 2 | 0 | 1 | 0 | — | | — | | 40 | 9 |
| Laval | Total | | 73 | 13 | 3 | 0 | 3 | 0 | 0 | 0 | 0 | 0 | 79 | 13 |
| Angers | 2007–08 | Ligue 2 | 33 | 5 | 5 | 4 | 1 | 0 | — | | — | | 39 | 9 |
| Angers | 2008–09 | Ligue 2 | 2 | 0 | — | | — | | — | | — | | 2 | 0 |
| Angers | Total | | 35 | 5 | 5 | 4 | 1 | 0 | 0 | 0 | 0 | 0 | 41 | 9 |
| Caen | 2008–09 | Ligue 1 | 30 | 2 | 2 | 0 | 1 | 0 | — | | — | | 33 | 2 |
| Valenciennes | 2009–10 | Ligue 1 | 36 | 7 | 1 | 0 | 1 | 0 | — | | — | | 38 | 7 |
| Valenciennes | 2010–11 | Ligue 1 | 3 | 0 | — | | — | | — | | — | | 3 | 0 |
| Valenciennes | Total | | 39 | 7 | 1 | 0 | 1 | 0 | 0 | 0 | 0 | 0 | 41 | 7 |
| Bordeaux | 2010–11 | Ligue 1 | 32 | 1 | 2 | 0 | 2 | 0 | — | | — | | 36 | 1 |
| Bordeaux | 2011–12 | Ligue 1 | 15 | 0 | 1 | 0 | 1 | 0 | — | | — | | 17 | 0 |
| Bordeaux | 2012–13 | Ligue 1 | 26 | 0 | 3 | 1 | 1 | 0 | 5 | 0 | — | | 35 | 1 |
| Bordeaux | 2013–14 | Ligue 1 | 3 | 0 | 1 | 0 | 0 | 0 | 3 | 0 | 1 | 0 | 8 | 0 |
| Bordeaux | Total | | 76 | 1 | 7 | 1 | 4 | 0 | 8 | 0 | 1 | 0 | 106 | 22 |
| Troyes | 2013–14 | Ligue 2 | 15 | 1 | — | | 1 | 0 | — | | — | | 16 | 1 |
| Melbourne Victory | 2014–15 | A-League | 27 | 5 | 1 | 1 | — | | — | | — | | 28 | 6 |
| Melbourne Victory | 2015–16 | A-League | 26 | 5 | 5 | 1 | — | | 0 | 0 | — | | 31 | 6 |
| Melbourne Victory | 2016–17 | A-League | 23 | 2 | 4 | 0 | — | | — | | — | | 27 | 2 |
| Melbourne Victory | Total | | 76 | 12 | 10 | 2 | 0 | 0 | 0 | 0 | 0 | 0 | 86 | 14 |
| Brisbane Roar | 2017–18 | A-League | 24 | 1 | 0 | 0 | — | | 1 | 0 | — | | 25 | 1 |
| Career total | | | 450 | 46 | 34 | 9 | 14 | 0 | 9 | 0 | 1 | 0 | 508 | 55 |

== Honours ==
Bordeaux

- Coupe de France: 2012–13

Melbourne Victory:

- A-League Championship: 2014–15
- A-League Premiership: 2014–15
- FFA Cup: 2015

Nunawading City

- Victorian State League Division 1: 2019

Individual

- Ligue 2 UNFP Team of the Year: 2007–08
- Victory Medal: 2014–15
- A-League PFA Team of the Season: 2014–15
