= Carl Valeri =

Australian soccer player (born 1984)

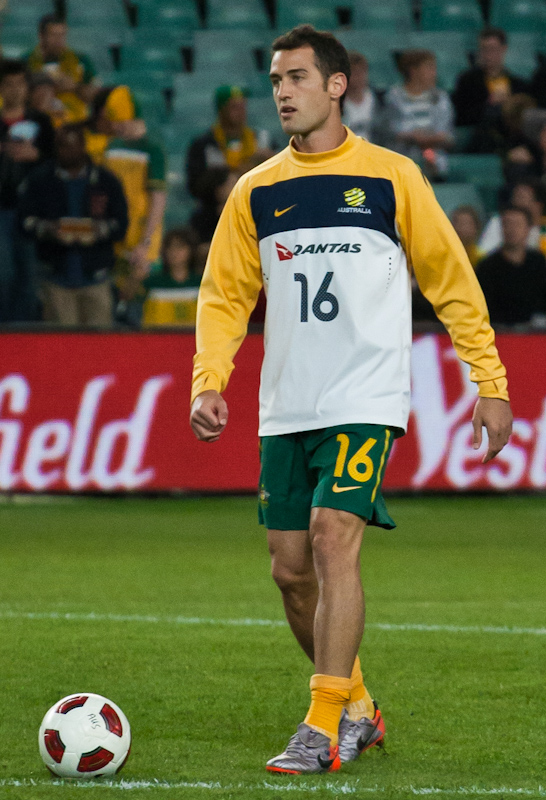
- Valeri playing for Australia in 2010

Personal information
- Full name: Carl Valeri
- Date of birth: 14 August 1984 (age 42)
- Place of birth: Canberra, Australia
- Height: 1.78 m (5 ft 10 in)
- Position: Defensive midfielder

Youth career
- 2001: AIS
- 2002–2004: Inter Milan

Senior career*
Years	Team	Apps	(Gls)
2004–2005	Inter Milan	0	(0)
2004–2005	→ SPAL (loan)	25	(0)
2005–2010	Grosseto	133	(7)
2010–2014	Sassuolo	70	(4)
2014	Ternana	8	(0)
2014–2019	Melbourne Victory	113	(2)
2019	Dandenong City	12	(0)
Total		349	(13)

International career^{‡}
2000–2001	Australia U17	13	(1)
2001–2003	Australia U20	12	(1)
2004	Australia U23	15	(1)
2007–2014	Australia	52	(1)
Medal record
Representing Australia
Men's Association football
AFC Asian Cup
Runner-up	2011 Qatar
OFC U-20 Championship
Winner	2002 Fiji/Vanuatu
- * Club domestic league appearances and goals as of 30 September 2019 ‡ National team caps and goals as of 27 May 2015

Carl Valeri (born 14 August 1984) is an Australian former professional soccer player who played as a defensive midfielder.

Valeri was born in Canberra and played youth football for Tuggeranong United and at the Australian Institute of Sport before moving to Italy to sign with Inter Milan in 2002. Valeri spent over ten years in Italy, most notably at Sassuolo and Grosseto.

Valeri made over 50 appearances for the Australia national team from 2007 to 2014, including at the 2010 FIFA World Cup. He also represented Australia's under-23 side at the 2004 Summer Olympics.

== Early life ==
Valeri was born and raised in Canberra, the son of a former National Soccer League midfielder, Walter Valeri. Carl attended Mary MacKillop College and later Lake Ginninderra College.

== Club career ==
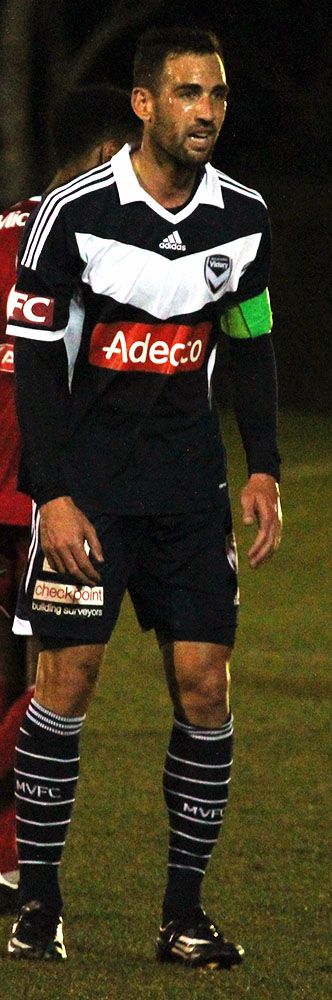
Valeri with Melbourne Victory in 2014

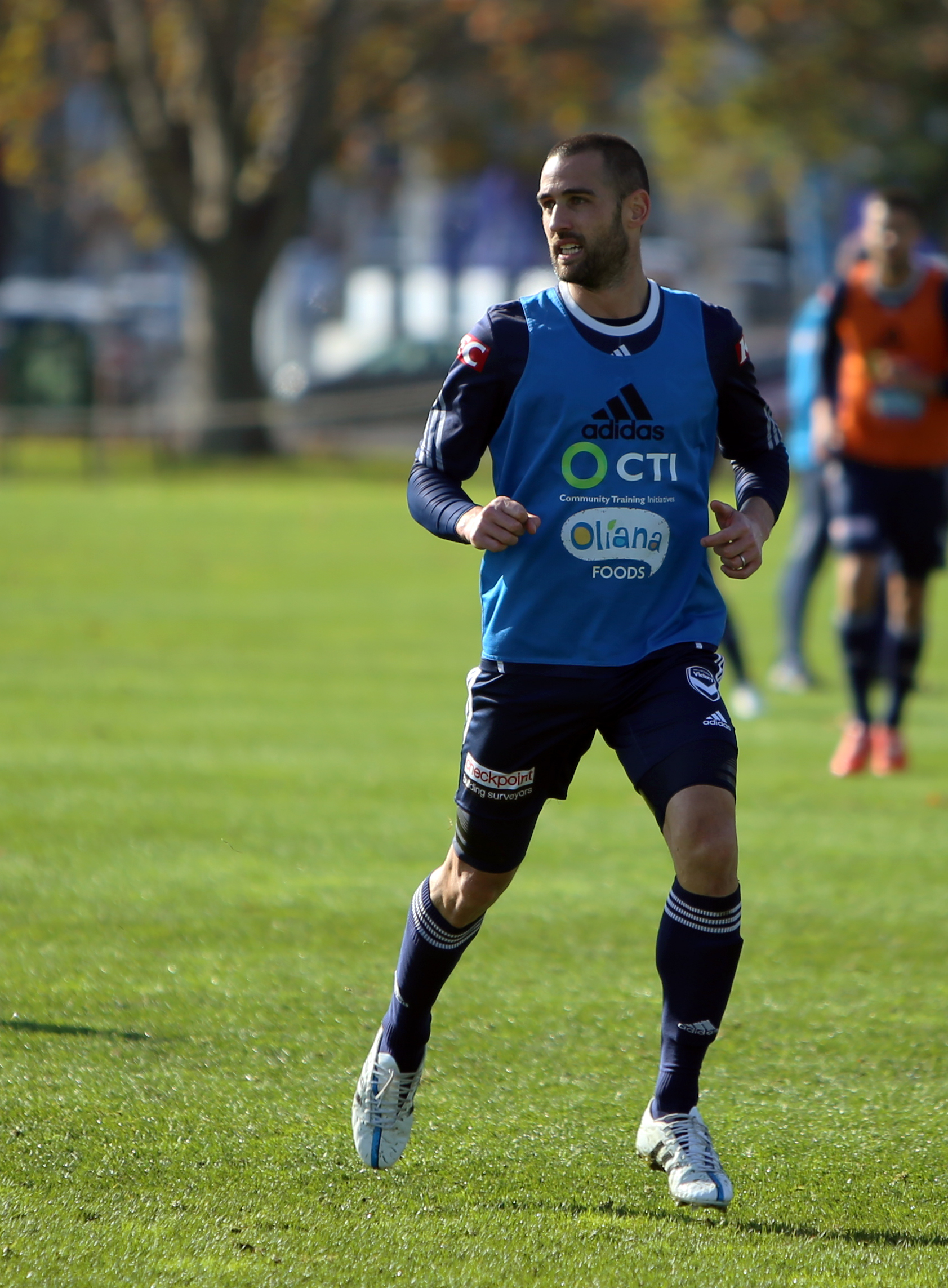
Valeri training for Melbourne Victory.

Valeri was signed as a teenager by Italian giants Inter Milan. He was loaned out to various clubs in Italy to gain further experience, including Grosseto. He joined Grosseto permanently in June 2007.

In January 2010 Valeri joined Sassuolo. Representing Australia in the starting 11 for the 2010 World Cup is his greatest achievement to date.

In May 2013, Valeri and his club Sassuolo finished as Serie B champions, thus securing automatic promotion to Serie A for the first time in their history.

In January 2014, he returned to Serie B with relegation battling Ternana until 30 June in hopes of securing a World Cup place with the Socceroos

In June 2014, Carl Valeri returned to his home country signing a three-year deal with Melbourne Victory. Valeri was an integral part of Victory's 2015 Championship team, starting all 29 games that season.

In September 2015 he was appointed captain of the team. Following an interrupted 2015–16 season, Valeri bounced back and became a regular starter for Victory in both the 2016–17 and 2017–18 seasons.

In April 2019, Valeri announced that he would retire at the conclusion of the 2018–19 A-League season.

In May 2019, it was announced that Valeri had signed on for National Premier Leagues Victoria side Dandenong City, along with former A-League players Adrian Leijer and Brendon Santalab.

== International career ==
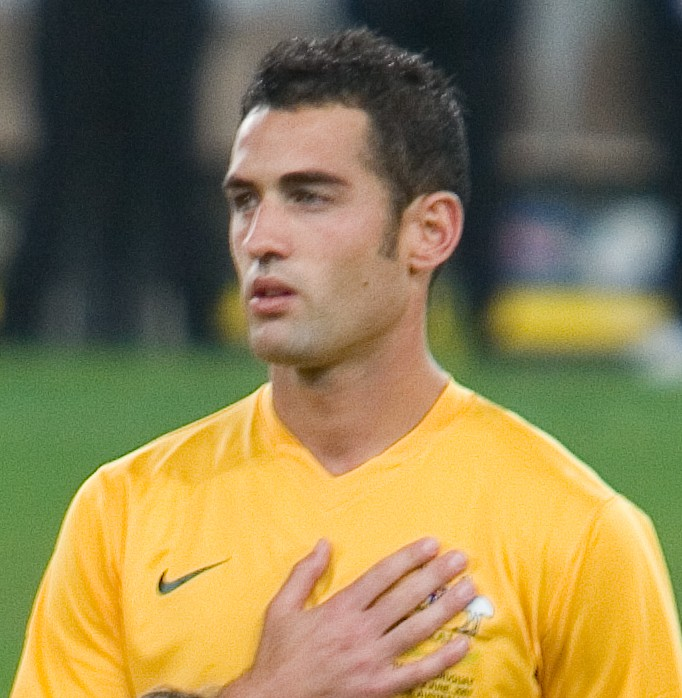
Valeri with Australia in 2007.

Valeri has played for Australia at all international youth levels; Under-17, Under-20 and Under-23.

He captained the Australian Under-17 team, the 'Joeys', at the 2001 FIFA World Youth Championship and competed with the Under-23 squad, the 'Olyroos', at the 2004 Athens Olympics.

After being an unused substitute in a 2007 Asian Cup qualifier against Bahrain in 2006, the 22-year-old received his second call up to the senior Australian national team in March 2007, as a replacement for the injured defensive midfielder Vince Grella.

He made his international debut on 24 March 2007 in a friendly game against China, which Australia won 2–0. This made him the 501st player to be capped for Australia. He made his home debut in a friendly against Uruguay.

Former Socceroos coach Graham Arnold has described Valeri as a key player of the future, and possible successor to Grella. This led to certain sections of the Australian media dubbing him "Mini Vinnie."

== Career statistics ==
=== Club ===
As of 9 December 2018

Appearances and goals by club, season and competition
Season	Club	League			Cup		Continental		Total	
Season	Club	Division	Apps	Goals	Apps	Goals	Apps	Goals	Apps	Goals
SPAL	2004–05	Serie C1	25	0	2	0	–		27	0
Grosseto	2005–06	Serie C1	27	1	2	0	–		29	1
Grosseto	2006–07	Serie C1	30	2	3	0	–		33	2
Grosseto	2007–08	Serie B	37	2	1	0	–		38	2
Grosseto	2008–09	Serie B	28	1	2	0	–		30	1
Grosseto	2009–10	Serie B	9	1	1	0	–		10	1
Grosseto	Total		133	7	11	0	0	0	144	7
Sassuolo	2009–10	Serie B	14	0	1	0	–		15	0
Sassuolo	2010–11	Serie B	22	0	1	0	–		23	0
Sassuolo	2011–12	Serie B	31	3	1	0	–		32	2
Sassuolo	2012–13	Serie B	3	1	2	0	–		5	1
Sassuolo	2013–14	Serie A	–		–		–		0	0
Sassuolo	Total		70	3	5	0	0	0	75	5
Melbourne Victory	2014–15	A-League	29	2	2	0	–		31	2
Melbourne Victory	2015–16	A-League	7	0	3	0	4	–	14	0
Melbourne Victory	2016–17	A-League	27	0	3	0	–		30	0
Melbourne Victory	2017–18	A-League	28	0	1	0	4	0	33	0
Melbourne Victory	2018–19	A-League	4	–	2	–	–		0	0
Melbourne Victory	Total		95	2	11	0	8	0	114	2
Career total			298	12	27	0	8	0	333	14

=== International ===
Appearances and goals by national team and year
National team	Year	Apps	Goals
Australia	2007	4	0
Australia	2008	10	0
Australia	2009	5	0
Australia	2010	10	0
Australia	2011	16	1
Australia	2012	5	0
Australia	2014	2	0
Total		52	1

#	Date	Venue	Opponent	Score	Result	Competition
1.	25 January 2011	Khalifa International Stadium, Al Rayyan, Qatar	Uzbekistan	6–0	Win	2011 Asian Cup

== Honours ==
[Melbourne Victory

- A-League Championship: 2014–2015, 2017–18
- A-League Premiership: 2014–2015
- FFA Cup: 2015

Grosseto

- Serie C1: 2006–07
- Supercoppa di Lega di Prima Divisione: 2007

Sassuolo

- Serie B: 2012–13

Australia

- AFC Asian Cup: runner-up 2011

Australia U-20

- OFC U-19 Men's Championship: 2002

Individual

- Melbourne Victory Goal of the Season: 2014–15
- Melbourne Victory Players' Player of the Season: 2014–15
- Victory Medal: 2016–17
