= Guilherme Finkler =

Brazilian footballer (born 1985)

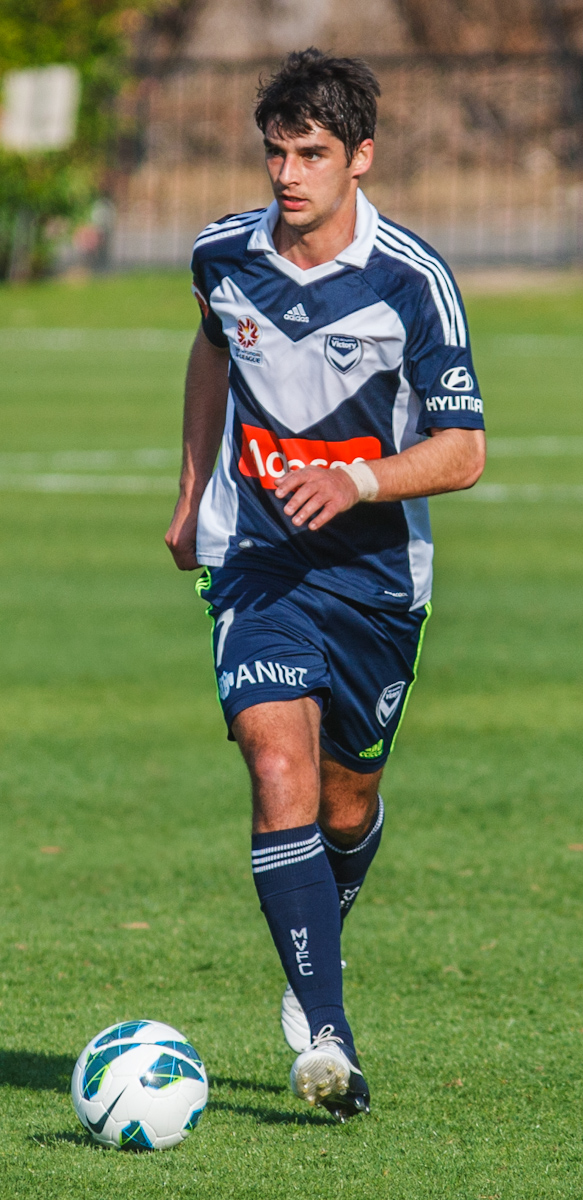
- Finkler playing for Melbourne Victory in 2012

Personal information
- Full name: Guilherme Ozelame Finkler
- Date of birth: 24 September 1985 (age 41)
- Place of birth: Caxias do Sul, Brazil
- Height: 1.84 m (6 ft 1/2 in)
- Position: Attacking midfielder

Youth career
- 2000–2005: Juventude

Senior career*
Years	Team	Apps	(Gls)
2005	Juventude	6	(1)
2005	Cianorte	11	(2)
2006–2007	Juventude	18	(4)
2006–2007	→ Wolverhampton (loan)	0	(0)
2007	→ Mouscron (loan)	1	(0)
2007	Ituano	3	(0)
2008	Esportivo	14	(2)
2008–2009	Caxias	9	(0)
2009	Campinense	2	(0)
2010	Caxias	11	(1)
2010	São José-PA	0	(0)
2010–2011	Criciúma	17	(3)
2011	Brasil de Pelotas	5	(0)
2012	Criciúma	0	(0)
2012	→ ABC (loan)	3	(0)
2012–2016	Melbourne Victory	93	(20)
2016–2017	Wellington Phoenix	28	(7)
2018	Juventude	0	(0)
2018	Sūduva	10	(2)
- * Club domestic league appearances and goals as of 11 March 2019

Guilherme Finkler (born September 24, 1985) is a retired Brazilian footballer who played as an attacking midfielder, commonly known as Guilherme in Brazil and Gui Finkler in Australia and New Zealand.

== Early life ==
Finkler was born in Caxias do Sul in the Brazilian state of Rio Grande do Sul in 1985.

Finkler has a wife, Karine, and a daughter, Rafaela.

== Club career ==
=== Early career ===
Finkler played for Brazilian side Juventude, scoring four times in 15 appearances in the 2006 season. Upon returning from a long spell at Cianorte he played in three further matches in 2007. Finkler's subsequent Brazilian club was Juventude's city rival, Caxias.

=== England and Belgium ===
During the 2006/2007 season, Finkler played for Wolverhampton Wanderers in the EFL Championship. After scoring several goals in pre-season games the club took the season-long loan option on Finkler. However, he never made a first-team appearance in any competitive game. His loan was then cut short in January 2007 by mutual consent. He continued his stay in Europe though, later in the 2006–2007 season he had a loan spell at Belgian Pro League club Mouscron.

=== Melbourne Victory ===
Finkler signed for Melbourne Victory on 22 June 2012, before the start of the 2012–13 A-League season.

==== Season 2012–2013 ====
Finkler made his debut for the Victory against crosstown rivals Melbourne Heart. After playing regularly for the Victory, Finkler suffered a season-ending injury against A-League debutant club Western Sydney Wanderers. His anterior cruciate ligament (ACL) was ruptured after a heavy tackle. The injury took Finkler out of the game for nearly a year. Before his injury, Finkler had been leading the A-League season 2012/2013 assists count with eight. He made his return to football in the 2013–2014 season.

==== Season 2013–2014 ====
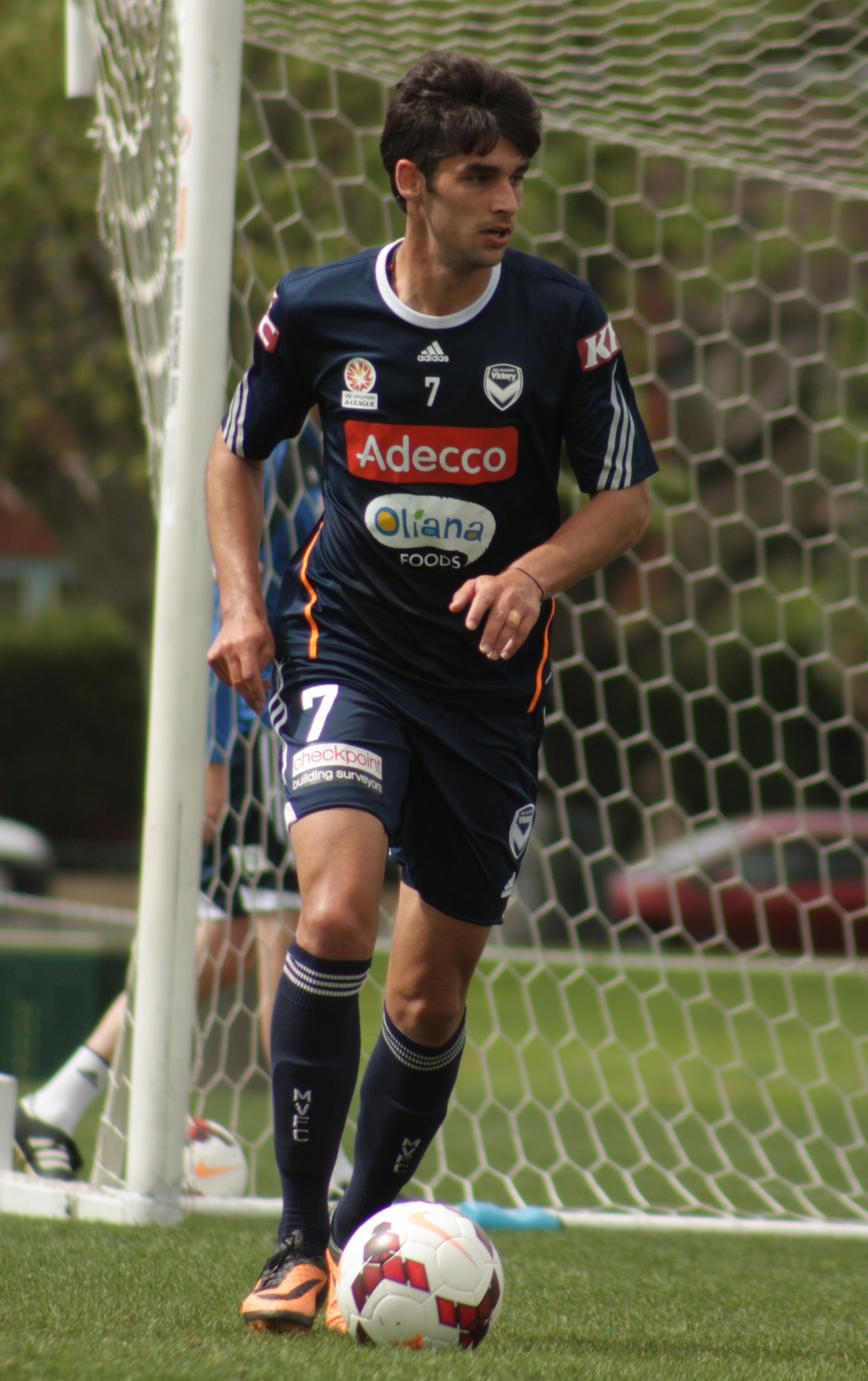
Gui Finkler training with Melbourne Victory in 2013

Finkler scored his first goal for Melbourne Victory (also Victory's first goal of the season) in a 2–2 draw against Adelaide United.

On 4 January 2014, Guilherme Finkler was named in the Melbourne Victory starting XI for the first time since his knee injury.

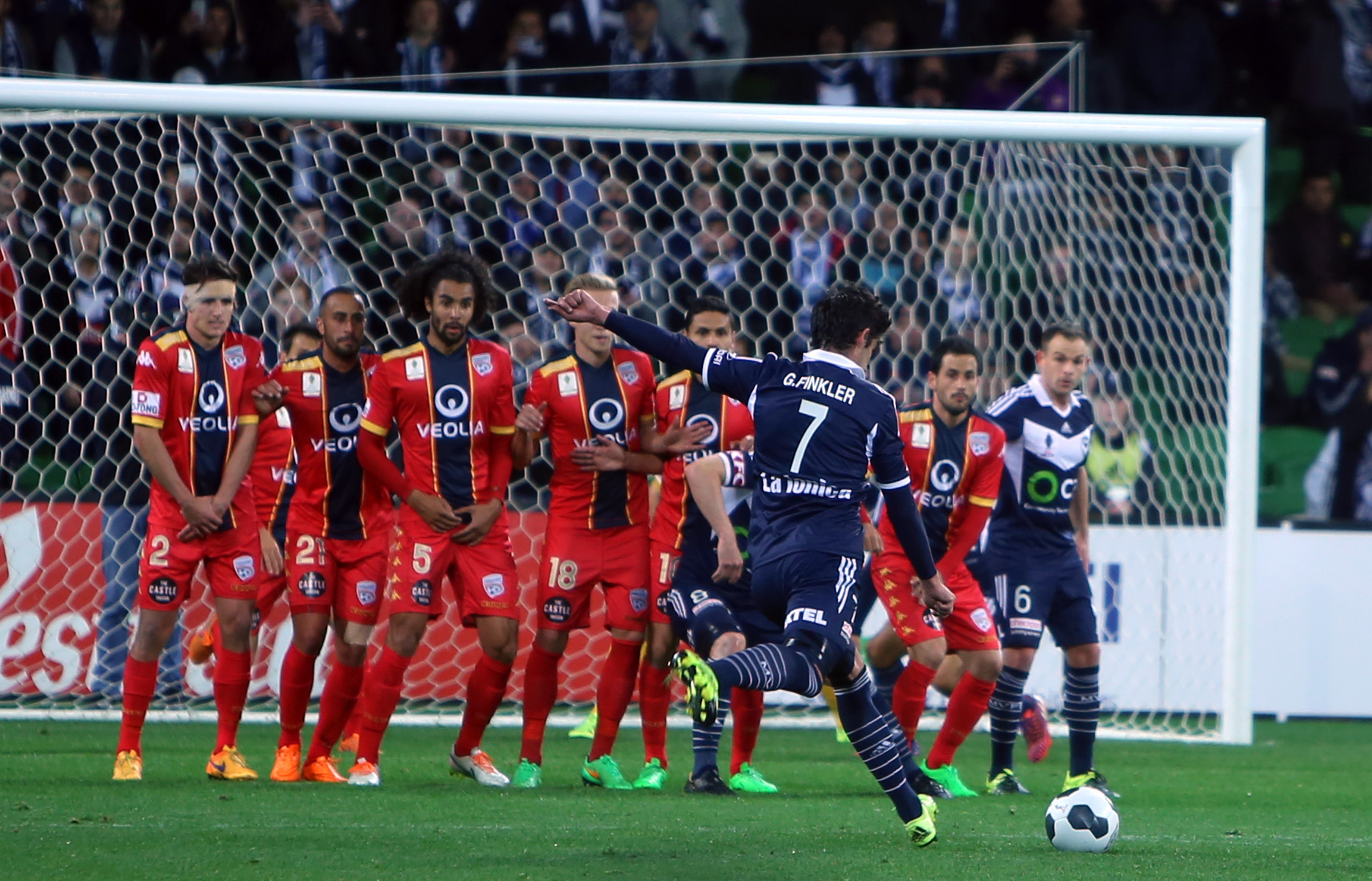
Finkler taking a free kick for Melbourne Victory against Adelaide United in the FFA Cup, September 2015

==== Season 2014–2015 ====
On 9 May 2014, Guilherme Finkler signed a two-year contract extension with Melbourne Victory.

The midfielder played injury-free, amassing 10 assists and 7 goals and helping his club win the A-league in Australia.

On 24 March 2016, Finkler advised the Victory that he would leave them at the end of the season to join Wellington Phoenix FC.

Wellington Phoenix

After he announced that he would leave Melbourne Victory at the end of 2015/2016 season, Finkler moved to Wellington Phoenix ahead of the 2016/2017 season.

During his maiden season with the Phoenix, Finkler made 24 appearances where he scored 6 goals and also provided 3 assists.

== Honours ==
Melbourne Victory

- A-League Men Premiers: 2014/15]]
- A-League Men Championship: 2014/15]]
- FFA Cup: 2015

Individual

- A-League Men PFA Team of the Season: 2014/15]]
- A-League All Stars: 2014
