= 2014–15 Brisbane Roar FC season =

Brisbane Roar FC
2014–15 season
- Chairman: Chris Fong
- Manager: Mike Mulvey (until 23 November 2014); Frans Thijssen (from 24 November 2014)
- Stadium: Suncorp Stadium, Brisbane
- A-League: 6th
- A-League Finals Series: Elimination-finals
- FFA Cup: Round of 16
- AFC Champions League: Group Stage
- Top goalscorer: League: Henrique (8); All: Henrique (9)
- Highest home attendance: 17,131 vs Melbourne City; 8 November 2014
- Lowest home attendance: 6,148 vs Central Coast Mariners; 2 April 2015
Home colours	Away colours

The 2014–15 Brisbane Roar FC season was the club's tenth season participating in the A-League, and in the newly formed FFA Cup for the first time, as well as the AFC Champions League for the third time.

== Squad lineup for 2014–15 ==
Correct as of 12 December – players' numbers as per the official Brisbane Roar website
Note: Flags indicate national team as defined under FIFA eligibility rules; some limited exceptions apply. Players may hold more than one non-FIFA nationality.

No.	Pos.	Nation	Player
1	GK	AUS	Michael Theo
2	DF	GER	Jérome Polenz
3	DF	AUS	Shane Stefanutto (Vice Captain)
4	MF	AUS	Adam Sarota
5	DF	AUS	Corey Brown
6	MF	AUS	George Lambadaridis
8	MF	AUS	Steven Lustica
9	FW	SRB	Andrija Kaluđerović
10	FW	BRA	Henrique
12	FW	CRC	Jean Carlos Solórzano
13	DF	AUS	Jade North
14	DF	AUS	Daniel Bowles
15	DF	AUS	James Donachie
16	MF	AUS	Devante Clut

No.	Pos.	Nation	Player
17	MF	AUS	Matt McKay (Captain)
18	MF	AUS	Luke Brattan
19	DF	AUS	Jack Hingert
20	FW	AUS	Kofi Danning
21	GK	ENG	Jamie Young (Note: Although being born in Australia, thus being an Australian citizen, Jamie Young decided to play for the England national team, representing them at youth level.)
22	MF	GER	Thomas Broich
23	MF	AUS	Dimitri Petratos
26	DF	AUS	Lachlan Jackson (Youth)
27	MF	AUS	Ben Litfin (FT Youth)
28	FW	AUS	Brandon Borrello (FT Youth)
29	FW	AUS	Patrick Theodore (FT Youth)
33	DF	AUS	Luke DeVere
34	MF	AUS	Shannon Brady (Youth)
36	GK	AUS	Fraser Chalmers (Youth)

Current Trialists
N/A

Unsuccessful Trialists

- (Australia) Lincoln Rule – (Australia) Western Pride FC
- (Australia) Reuben Way – (Australia) Olympic FC
- (Australia) Matt Thurtell – (Australia) Brisbane Strikers

== Transfers and contracts ==
=== New contracts ===
Date	Pos.	Name	Contract (Season end)	Notes
6 May 2014	FW	(Costa Rica) Jean Carlos Solórzano	2015/16	Re-Signing
19 August 2014	MF	(Australia) Luke Brattan	2016/17	Re-Signing
27 August 2014	MF	(Australia) Dimitri Petratos	2016/17	Re-Signing
12 February 2015	DF	(Australia) Corey Brown	2017/18	Re-Signing
21 March 2015	DF	(Australia) Luke DeVere	2016/17	Re-Signing
30 March 2015	MF	(Australia) Shannon Brady	2018/19	Re-Signing

=== Senior team ===
==== In ====
Date	Pos.	Name	From	Contract	Fee
8 July 2014	GK	(England) Jamie Young	(England) Hayes & Yeading United	2015/16	Free
8 July 2014	DF	(Australia) Daniel Bowles	(Australia) Adelaide United	2015/16	Free
14 July 2014	FW	(North Macedonia) Mensur Kurtiši	(North Macedonia) FK Shkëndija	2014/15	Free
20 September 2014	MF	(Australia) Adam Sarota	(Netherlands) FC Utrecht	2014/15	Season loan
7 October 2014	GK	(Australia) Matt Acton	(Myanmar) Yangon United	2014/15	Injury replacement
6 January 2015	DF	(Germany) Jérome Polenz	Free agent	2016/17	Free
24 January 2015	DF	(Australia) Luke DeVere	Free agent	2014/15	Free
29 January 2015	FW	(Serbia) Andrija Kaluđerović	Free agent	2014/15	Free

==== Out ====
Date	Pos.	Name	To	Fee
5 May 2014	FW	(Albania) Besart Berisha	(Australia) Melbourne Victory	Free (Pre-contract)
9 May 2014	GK	(Australia) Matt Acton	Free agent	Free (Contract expired)
27 May 2014	DF	(Australia) Diogo Ferreira	Free agent	Free (Contract expired)
8 July 2014	FW	(Australia) Julius Davies	(Romania) Oțelul Galați	Free
3 August 2014	DF	(Australia) Ivan Franjic	(Russia) Torpedo Moscow	Undisclosed
30 October 2014	MF	(Republic of Ireland) Liam Miller	Free agent	Released
9 December 2014	DF	(Australia) Matt Smith	(Thailand) Bangkok Glass	Undisclosed
15 January 2015	FW	(North Macedonia) Mensur Kurtiši	Free agent	Released

== Senior team ==
=== Overall ===
Competition	Final position / round	First match	Last match
A-League	6th	12 October 2014	24 April 2015
A-League Finals	Elimination-finals	1 May 2015	1 May 2015
FFA Cup	Round of 16	19 August 2014	23 September 2014
AFC Champions League	Group Stage	25 February 2015	5 May 2015

=== Fixtures ===
==== Pre-season and friendlies ====
30 July 2014 Friendly	Brisbane Roar	8–1	(Queensland) Moreton Bay United	Brisbane
Wednesday 19:00 AEST	Henrique 25', 38', 49', 56'; Broich 30', 69'; Farina 85' (o.g.); Petratos 87'	Report; Highlights	Forsyth 48'	Stadium: Ballymore Stadium; Referee: Adam Kersey

5 August 2014 Friendly	Brisbane Roar	3–0	(Queensland) Redlands United	Brisbane
Tuesday 19:00 AEST	Solórzano 39', 69'; Petratos 74'	Report		Stadium: Ballymore Stadium

24 August 2014 Townsville Football Cup	Brisbane Roar	4–0	Newcastle Jets	Townsville
Sunday 17:00 AEST	Petratos 6'; Henrique 39' (pen.); Miller 75'; Brady 86'	Report		Stadium: Townsville Sports Reserve

27 August 2014 Townsville Football Cup	Northern Fury (Queensland)	1–5	Brisbane Roar	Townsville
Wednesday 17:30 AEST	J. Crowley 49'	Report	Brown 18' (pen.); Kurtiši 54', 63', 80'; Danning 55'	Stadium: Townsville Sports Reserve

30 August 2014 Townsville Football Cup	Sydney FC	2–0	Brisbane Roar	Townsville
Saturday 20:00 AEST	Gameiro 25'; Janko 75'	Report		Stadium: Townsville Sports Reserve; Referee: Matthew Skinner

12 September 2014 Friendly	Brisbane Roar	1–1	Central Coast Mariners	Brisbane
Friday 15:45 AEST	Henrique 79'	Report	Fitzgerald 43'	Stadium: Ballymore Stadium; Referee: Jason Crow

12 September 2014 Friendly	Brisbane Roar	3–0	(Queensland) Brisbane City	Brisbane
Friday 18:30 AEST	Ingham 12', 85'; O'Neill 55'	Report		Stadium: Ballymore Stadium

17 September 2014 Friendly	Brisbane Roar	9–0	(Queensland) Palm Beach	Brisbane
Wednesday AEST	Broich 18', 39', 63', 87'; Henrique 21', 30'; Miller 27', 89'; Lustica 70'	Report		Stadium: QSAC; Attendance: N/A (Behind closed doors)

1 October 2014 Friendly	Olympic FC (Queensland)	0–10	Brisbane Roar	Brisbane
Wednesday 19:00 AEST		Report	McKay 15'; Miller 19'; Kurtiši 26', 30', 43', 45', 66'; Petratos 37', 74'; Lustica 85'	Stadium: Goodwin Park

3 June 2015 2015 LFP World Club Challenge	Brisbane Roar (Australia)	3–0	(Spain) Villarreal	Brisbane, Australia
19:00 (AEST)	Clut 40', 71'; Solorzano 44'	Report		Stadium: Suncorp Stadium; Attendance: 8,978; Referee: Ben Williams

==== A-League ====
===== Regular season =====
12 October 2014 1	Brisbane Roar	1–2	Adelaide United	Brisbane
Sunday 16:00 AEST	Broich 20'; McKay (yellow card) 71' (red card) 71'	Report; Summary	Djite 33'; Donachie 56' (o.g.)	Stadium: Suncorp Stadium; Attendance: 16,195; Referee: Ben Williams

19 October 2014 2	Perth Glory	3–2	Brisbane Roar	Perth
Sunday 14:00 AWST	Keogh 49' (pen.), 74', 90+2'	Report; Summary	Kurtiši 39'; Henrique 55'	Stadium: nib Stadium; Attendance: 8,789; Referee: Shaun Evans

24 October 2014 3	Brisbane Roar	0–2	Sydney FC	Brisbane
Friday 19:00 AEST		Report; Summary	Janko 28'; Dimitrijević 54'	Stadium: Suncorp Stadium; Attendance: 14,141; Referee: Peter Green

3 December 2014; Rescheduled 4	Western Sydney Wanderers	0–1	Brisbane Roar	Parramatta
Wednesday 19:30 AEDT		Report; Summary	Henrique 5' (pen.)	Stadium: Pirtek Stadium; Attendance: 10,252; Referee: Kris Griffiths-Jones

8 November 2014 5	Brisbane Roar	1–3	Melbourne City	Brisbane
Saturday 18:45 AEST	Borrello 67'	Report; Summary	Williams 8'; Dugandzic 10'; Marino 83'	Stadium: Suncorp Stadium; Attendance: 17,131; Referee: Kris Griffiths-Jones

14 November 2014 6	Newcastle Jets	0–4	Brisbane Roar	Newcastle
Friday 19:40 ADST		Report; Summary	Henrique 49', 72', 89'; Lustica 66'	Stadium: Hunter Stadium; Attendance: 10,216; Referee: Alan Milliner

21 November 2014 7	Melbourne Victory	1–0	Brisbane Roar	Melbourne
Friday 19:40 AEDT	North 77' (o.g.)	Report; Summary		Stadium: Etihad Stadium; Attendance: 23,740; Referee: Chris Beath

29 November 2014 8	Brisbane Roar	1–1	Perth Glory	Brisbane
Saturday 16:00 AEST	Henrique 86'	Report; Summary	Djulbic 20'	Stadium: Suncorp Stadium; Attendance: 13,043; Referee: Strebre Delovski

7 December 2014 9	Melbourne City	1–0	Brisbane Roar	Melbourne
Sunday 17:00 AEDT	Mooy 49' (pen.)	Report; Summary		Stadium: AAMI Park; Referee: Shaun Evans

12 December 2014 10	Adelaide United	0–1	Brisbane Roar	Adelaide
Friday 19:00 ACDT		Report; Summary	Henrique 18'	Stadium: Coopers Stadium; Referee: Lucien Lavendure

25 March 2014; Rescheduled 11	Brisbane Roar	1–4	Western Sydney Wanderers	Brisbane
Wednesday 19:00 AEST	Aspropotamitis 41' (o.g.)	Report	Rukavytsya 20'; Bulut 44', 89'; Castelen 58'	Stadium: Suncorp Stadium; Attendance: 6,813; Referee: Lucien Laverdure

27 December 2014 12	Central Coast Mariners	3–3	Brisbane Roar	Gosford
Saturday 17:00 AEDT	Bosnar 56'; Simon 63'; Seung-yong 80'	Report; Summary	Solórzano 45', 81'; Donachie 71'	Stadium: Central Coast Stadium; Attendance: 10,019; Referee: Matthew Conger

30 December 2014 13	Brisbane Roar	0–0	Sydney FC	Brisbane
Tuesday 19:00 AEST		Report; Summary		Stadium: Suncorp Stadium; Attendance: 15,765; Referee: Chris Beath

4 January 2015 14	Wellington Phoenix	3–0	Brisbane Roar	Wellington
Sunday 17:00 NZDT	Muscat 4'; Brockie 51' (pen.), 67'	Report		Stadium: Westpac Stadium; Attendance: 10,267; Referee: Stephen Lucas

2 February 2015 15	Brisbane Roar	3–2	Wellington Phoenix	Brisbane
Monday 19:00 AEST	Donachie 60'; Borrello 76'; Solórzano 90+2'	Report	Krishna 50'; Cunningham 81'	Stadium: Suncorp Stadium; Attendance: 9,263; Referee: Alan Milliner

6 February 2015 16	Newcastle Jets	1–2	Brisbane Roar	Newcastle
Friday 19:40 AEDT	Pavicevic 72'	Report	Solórzano 35'; Welsh 90+3' (o.g.)	Stadium: Hunter Stadium; Attendance: 6,994; Referee: Chris Beath

13 February 2015 17	Central Coast Mariners	0–2	Brisbane Roar	Gosford
Friday 19:40 AEDT		Report	Solórzano 50' (pen.); Kaluđerović 90+2' (pen.)	Stadium: Central Coast Stadium; Attendance: 6,021; Referee: Kris Griffiths-Jones

15 April 2015; Rescheduled 18	Brisbane Roar	1–2	Melbourne Victory	Brisbane
Wednesday 19:40 AEST	McKay 51'	Report	Valeri 17'; Berisha 22'	Stadium: Suncorp Stadium; Attendance: 10,642; Referee: Chris Beath

28 February 2015 19	Perth Glory	2–2	Brisbane Roar	Perth
Saturday 18:45 AWST	De Silva 26'; Djulbic 84'	Report	Solórzano 59'; McKay 62'; C. Brown (red card) 76'	Stadium: nib Stadium; Attendance: 10,422; Referee: Ben Williams

8 March 2015 20	Brisbane Roar	1–0	Western Sydney Wanderers	Brisbane
Sunday 16:00 AEST	Borrello 55'	Report		Stadium: Suncorp Stadium; Attendance: 12,095; Referee: Yudai Yamamoto (Japan)

15 March 2015 21	Sydney FC	5–4	Brisbane Roar	Sydney
Sunday 17:00 AEDT	Jurman 7'; Janko 38' (pen.), 52', 76' (pen.); Brosque 89'	Report	Henrique 5'; Kaluđerović 80' (pen.); Lustica 84'; Petratos 90'	Stadium: Allianz Stadium; Attendance: 13,818; Referee: Kris Griffiths-Jones

22 March 2015 22	Brisbane Roar	1–2	Wellington Phoenix	Brisbane
Sunday 16:00 AEST	Kaluđerović 5'	Report	McGlinchey 20'; Burns 45'	Stadium: Suncorp Stadium; Attendance: 10,075; Referee: Alan Milliner

28 March 2015 23	Melbourne City	1–0	Brisbane Roar	Melbourne
19:30 AEDT (UTC+11:00)	Germano 5'	Report		Stadium: AAMI Park; Attendance: 9,561; Referee: Kris Griffiths-Jones

2 April 2015 24	Brisbane Roar	6–1	Central Coast Mariners	Brisbane
Thursday 18:30 AEST	Kaluđerović 21'; Lustica 28', 41', 79'; Clut 48'; Borrello 50'	Report	Bowles 64' (o.g.)	Stadium: Suncorp Stadium; Attendance: 6,148; Referee: Kazuyoshi Enomoto (Japan)

11 April 2015 25	Adelaide United	2–3	Brisbane Roar	Adelaide
Saturday 16:30 ACDT	Goodwin 71'; Sánchez 90+4' (pen.)	Report	Kaluđerović 26'; Galekovic 40' (o.g.); Hingert 54'; Bowles (red card) 90+3'	Stadium: Coopers Stadium; Attendance: 10,659; Referee: Strebre Delovski

18 April 2015 26	Brisbane Roar	0–1	Melbourne Victory	Brisbane
Saturday 19:30 AEST		Report	Milligan 45+2'	Stadium: Suncorp Stadium; Attendance: 11,582; Referee: Ben Williams

24 April 2015 27	Brisbane Roar	2–1	Newcastle Jets	Brisbane
Friday 19:40 AEST	Danning 71'; Jackson 86'	Report	Montaño 77'	Stadium: Suncorp Stadium; Attendance: 8,693; Referee: Stephen Lucas

===== Finals series =====
1 May 2015 Elimination-finals	Adelaide United	2–1	Brisbane Roar	Adelaide
Friday 19:00 ACST	Goodwin 7'; Mabil 87'	Report	Broich 27'	Stadium: Adelaide Oval; Attendance: 20,155; Referee: Peter Green

==== FFA Cup ====
19 August 2014 Round of 32	Stirling Lions (Western Australia)	0–4	Brisbane Roar	Perth
Tuesday 19:30 AWST		Report; Summary	Henrique 31'; Brown 55'; Smith 63'; Solórzano 68'	Stadium: Western Australian Athletics Stadium; Attendance: 1,152; Referee: Lucien Lavendure

23 September 2014 Round of 16	Adelaide United	2–0	Brisbane Roar	Adelaide
Tuesday 19:00 ACST	Djite 35'; Cirio 47'	Report; Summary		Stadium: Coopers Stadium; Attendance: 4,053; Referee: Shaun Evans

==== AFC Champions League ====
===== Group stage =====
25 February 2015 1	Brisbane Roar (Australia)	0–1	(China) Beijing Guoan	Gold Coast
19:30 UTC+10		Report	Shao 90+2'	Stadium: Robina Stadium; Attendance: 6,851; Referee: Ahmed Al-Kaf (Oman)

4 March 2015 2	Urawa Red Diamonds (Japan)	0–1	(Australia) Brisbane Roar	Saitama
19:30 UTC+9		Report	Borrello 3'	Stadium: Saitama Stadium 2002; Attendance: 13,527; Referee: Ilgiz Tantashev (Uzbekistan)

18 March 2015 3	Brisbane Roar (Australia)	3–3	(South Korea) Suwon Bluewings	Gold Coast
19:30 UTC+10	Borrello 13'; Clut 22', 80'	Report	Seo 39', 50'; Jong 71'	Stadium: Robina Stadium; Attendance: 5,197; Referee: Fahad Al-Mirdasi (Saudi Arabia)

8 April 2015 4	Suwon Bluewings (South Korea)	3–1	(Australia) Brisbane Roar	Suwon
19:30 UTC+9	Kwon 51'; Seo 58'; Yeom 64'	Report	DeVere 76'	Stadium: Suwon World Cup Stadium; Attendance: 6,771; Referee: Abdulrahman Al-Jassim (Qatar)

21 April 2015 5	Beijing Guoan (China)	0–1	(Australia) Brisbane Roar	Beijing
19:30 UTC+8		Report	Kaluđerović 39'	Stadium: Workers Stadium; Attendance: 35,578; Referee: Valentin Kovalenko (Uzbekistan)

5 May 2015 6	Brisbane Roar (Australia)	1–2	(Japan) Urawa Red Diamonds	Gold Coast
19:30 UTC+10	Kaluđerović 70'	Report	Koroki 24'; Muto 57'	Stadium: Robina Stadium; Attendance: 5,941; Referee: Alireza Faghani (Iran)

=== Statistics ===
==== All competitions ====
===== Squad statistics =====
Squad and statistics accurate as of 4 January 2015
90 Minutes played is counted as a full game. Injury Time is not counted. A sub's appearance is counted up to the 90th minute as well. If a substitution is made during extra time, it is counted as a full game (90mins) to the player that started. The substitute is credited with the number of minutes made up from 30 seconds for every substitution in the game by both teams combined. If there is an uneven number of substitutions made in total, the number of minutes is rounded up to the following number (2.5 mins = 3 mins).
If a shot is taken by a player but then saved by the goalkeeper before a follow-up shot scores a goal, the player/s that took the shot before the save is/are NOT credited with an assist. If a penalty is won and scored, the person who was fouled for the penalty is NOT credited with an assist.
If a Finals game goes to Extra Time and a substitution is made, per the original rule, only the 30 minutes (2x 15 minute halves) is counted, NOT injury time. If the referee adds injury to either half and a substitution IS made during injury time, it also reverts to the original rule (2.5 mins = 3 mins)
Total Games played: 15
A-League Games played: 13
FFA Cup Games played: 2
ACL Games played: 0
Player has departed the club mid season
Player has joined the club mid season
Player has been injured before or during the season and in turn, has ended their season. For a player to be coloured, they need to miss 6 games before the end of the season (including finals)

No	Nat	Name	CNT	League					FFA Cup					ACL					Total					Notes
No	Nat	Name	CNT	Strt	Sub	Min	Goal	Asst	Strt	Sub	Min	Goal	Asst	Strt	Sub	Min	Goal	Asst	Strt	Sub	Min	Goal	Asst	Notes
Goalkeepers
1	(Australia)	Michael Theo	16/17	–	–	–	–	–	1	–	90	–	–	–	–	–	–	–	1	–	90	–	–	
21	(England)	Jamie Young	15/16	13	–	1170	–	–	1	–	90	–	–	–	–	–	–	–	14	–	1260	–	–	
--	(Australia)	Fraser Chalmers	13/14	–	–	–	–	–	–	–	–	–	–	–	–	–	–	–	–	–	–	–	–	
Defenders
2	(Australia)	Matt Smith	15/16	9	1	813	–	–	1	–	90	1	–	–	–	–	–	–	10	1	903	1	–	^{[2]}
2	(Germany)	Jérome Polenz	16/17	–	–	–	–	–	–	–	–	–	–	–	–	–	–	–	–	–	–	–	–	
3	(Australia)	Shane Stefanutto	14/15	6	1	470	–	1	1	–	90	–	–	–	–	–	–	–	7	1	560	–	1	^{[3]}
5	(Australia)	Corey Brown	14/15	7	–	630	–	1	2	–	135	1	–	–	–	–	–	–	9	–	765	1	1	
13	(Australia)	Jade North	15/16	13	–	1159	–	–	2	–	180	–	–	–	–	–	–	–	15	–	1339	–	–	
14	(Australia)	Daniel Bowles	15/16	9	–	810	–	1	1	1	96	–	–	–	–	–	–	–	10	1	906	–	1	
15	(Australia)	James Donachie	16/17	7	2	748	1	–	2	–	180	–	–	–	–	–	–	–	9	2	928	1	–	^{[1]}
19	(Australia)	Jack Hingert	15/16	1	1	56	–	–	1	–	90	–	–	–	–	–	–	–	2	1	146	–	–	
26	(Australia)	Lachlan Jackson	14/15	–	–	–	–	–	–	–	–	–	–	–	–	–	–	–	–	–	–	–	–	
33	(Australia)	Luke DeVere	14/15	–	–	–	–	–	–	–	–	–	–	–	–	–	–	–	–	–	–	–	–	
Midfielders
4	(Australia)	Adam Sarota	14/15	3	2	284	–	–	–	–	–	–	–	–	–	–	–	–	3	2	284	–	–	^{[3]}
6	(Australia)	George Lambadaridis	14/15	–	–	–	–	–	–	1	25	–	–	–	–	–	–	–	–	1	25	–	–	
8	(Australia)	Steven Lustica	15/16	8	4	724	1	–	2	–	160	–	–	–	–	–	–	–	10	4	884	1	–	
11	(Republic of Ireland)	Liam Miller	14/15	1	1	90	–	–	1	–	90	–	–	–	–	–	–	–	2	1	180	–	–	
16	(Australia)	Devante Clut	15/16	–	1	24	–	–	–	–	–	–	–	–	–	–	–	–	–	1	24	–	–	
17	(Australia)	Matt McKay	14/15	8	–	692	–	1	–	–	–	–	–	–	–	–	–	–	8	–	692	–	1	
18	(Australia)	Luke Brattan	16/17	12	–	1052	–	–	1	–	90	–	–	–	–	–	–	–	13	–	1142	–	–	
22	(Germany)	Thomas Broich	16/17	7	–	630	1	2	2	–	180	–	2	–	–	–	–	–	9	–	810	1	4	
29	(Australia)	Shannon Brady	14/15	–	1	9	–	–	–	–	–	–	–	–	–	–	–	–	–	1	9	–	–	
30	(Australia)	Ben Litfin	14/15	–	–	–	–	–	–	–	–	–	–	–	–	–	–	–	–	–	–	–	–	
Forwards
7	(North Macedonia)	Mensur Kurtiši	14/15	5	4	396	1	1	–	1	20	–	–	–	–	–	–	–	5	5	416	1	1	
10	(Brazil)	Henrique	15/16	11	2	960	7	2	2	–	144	1	–	–	–	–	–	–	13	2	1104	8	2	
12	(Costa Rica)	Jean Carlos Solórzano	15/16	5	5	501	2	–	–	2	36	1	–	–	–	–	–	–	5	7	537	3	–	^{[1]} ^{[2]}
20	(Australia)	Kofi Danning	14/15	–	3	53	–	–	–	–	–	–	–	–	–	–	–	–	–	3	53	–	–	
23	(Australia)	Dimitri Petratos	16/17	13	–	1075	–	1	2	–	180	–	1	–	–	–	–	–	15	–	1255	–	2	
28	(Australia)	Brandon Borrello	15/16	5	5	514	1	–	–	1	14	–	–	–	–	–	–	–	5	6	528	1	–	
34	(Australia)	Patrick Theodore	15/16	–	–	–	–	–	–	–	–	–	–	–	–	–	–	–	–	–	–	–	–	
--	(Serbia)	Andrija Kaluđerović	14/15	–	–	–	–	–	–	–	–	–	–	–	–	–	–	–	–	–	–	–	–	

- ^{[1]} – Jean Carlos Solorzano replaced James Donachie in the 90th minute vs Adelaide United in Round 1. 6 substitutions were made in total (3mins)
- ^{[2]} – Matt Smith replaced Jean Carlos Solorzano in the 90th minute vs Adelaide United in Round 10. 5 substitutions were made in total (3mins)
- ^{[3]} – Shane Stefanutto replaced Adam Sarota in the 90th minute vs Sydney FC in Round 13. 5 substitutions were made in total (3mins)

===== Disciplinary record =====
Correct as of 4 January 2015
Red card column denotes players who were sent off after receiving a straight red card. The two yellow cards column denotes players who were sent off after receiving two yellow cards.
Player has departed the club mid season
Player has joined the club mid season
Player has been injured before or during the season and in turn, has ended their season. For a player to be coloured, they need to miss 6 games before the end of the season (including finals)

#	Nat.	Pos.	Name	League			FFA Cup			ACL			Total		
#	Nat.	Pos.	Name	Yellow card	Yellow card	Red card	Yellow card	Yellow card	Red card	Yellow card	Yellow card	Red card	Yellow card	Yellow card	Red card
18	(Australia)	MF	Luke Brattan	4	–	–	1	–	–	–	–	–	5	-	-
14	(Australia)	DF	Daniel Bowles	3	–	–	2	–	–	–	–	–	5	-	-
13	(Australia)	DF	Jade North	5	–	–	–	–	–	–	–	–	5	-	-
15	(Australia)	DF	James Donachie	2	–	–	1	–	–	–	–	–	3	-	-
5	(Australia)	DF	Corey Brown	3	–	–	–	–	–	–	–	–	3	-	-
22	(Germany)	MF	Thomas Broich	2	–	–	–	–	–	–	–	–	2	-	-
17	(Australia)	MF	Matt McKay	1	1	–	–	–	–	–	–	–	1	1	-
2	(Australia)	DF	Matt Smith	1	–	–	1	–	–	–	–	–	2	-	-
28	(Australia)	FW	Brandon Borrello	2	–	–	–	–	–	–	–	–	2	-	-
19	(Australia)	DF	Jack Hingert	–	–	–	1	–	–	–	–	–	1	-	-
11	(Australia)	MF	Liam Miller	–	–	–	1	–	–	–	–	–	1	-	-
7	(North Macedonia)	FW	Mensur Kurtiši	1	–	–	–	–	–	–	–	–	1	-	-
8	(Australia)	MF	Steven Lustica	1	–	–	–	–	–	–	–	–	1	-	-
21	(Australia)	GK	Jamie Young	1	–	–	–	–	–	–	–	–	1	-	-
			TOTALS	26	1	0	7	0	0	0	0	0	33	1	0

===== Home attendance =====
Win Draw Loss
League attendance and average includes Finals Series

Competition	Round	Date	Day	Time	Score	Opponent	Attendance
A-League	1	12 October 2014	Sunday	16:00	1–2	Adelaide United	16,195
A-League	3	24 October 2014	Friday	19:00	0–2	Sydney FC	14,141
A-League	5	8 November 2014	Saturday	18:45	1–3	Melbourne City	17,131
A-League	8	29 November 2014	Saturday	16:00	1–1	Perth Glory	13,043
A-League	11	25 March 2015	Wednesday	19:00		Western Sydney Wanderers	
A-League	13	30 December 2014	Tuesday	19:00	0–0	Sydney FC	15,765
A-League	16	2 February 2015	Monday	19:00	3–2	Wellington Phoenix	9,263
A-League	18	15 April 2015	Wednesday	19:00		Melbourne Victory	
A-League	20	8 March 2015	Sunday	16:00	1–0	Western Sydney Wanderers	12,095
A-League	22	22 March 2015	Sunday	16:00		Wellington Phoenix	
A-League	24	2 April 2015	Thursday	18:30		Central Coast Mariners	
A-League	26	18 April 2015	Saturday	19:30		Melbourne Victory	
A-League	27	24 April 2015	Friday	19:40		Newcastle Jets	
ACL^{†}	1	25 February 2015	Wednesday	19:30	0–1	Beijing Guoan	6,851
ACL^{†}	3	18 March 2015	Wednesday	19:30		Suwon Bluewings	
ACL^{†}	6	5 May 2015	Tuesday	19:30		Urawa Red Diamonds	
						Total Attendance	76,275
						Total Average Attendance	15,255

† ACL home games were moved to Robina Stadium.

==== A-League ====
===== HAL results summary =====
Overall								Home						Away					
Pld	W	D	L	GF	GA	GD	Pts	W	D	L	GF	GA	GD	W	D	L	GF	GA	GD
27	10	4	13	42	43	−1	34	4	2	7	18	21	−3	6	2	6	24	22	+2

Last updated: 24 April 2015.
Source: Competitive matches

===== HAL ladder =====
Pos	Team	Pld	W	D	L	GF	GA	GD	Pts	Qualification
1	Melbourne Victory (C)	27	15	8	4	56	31	+25	53	Qualification for 2016 AFC Champions League group stage and Finals series
2	Sydney FC	27	14	8	5	52	35	+17	50	Qualification for 2016 AFC Champions League group stage and Finals series
3	Adelaide United	27	14	4	9	47	32	+15	46	Qualification for 2016 AFC Champions League qualifying play-off and Finals series
4	Wellington Phoenix (Note: Wellington Phoenix cannot qualify for the AFC Champions League as they are not recognised as an AFC club.)	27	14	4	9	45	35	+10	46	Qualification for Finals series
5	Melbourne City	27	9	8	10	36	41	−5	35	Qualification for Finals series
6	Brisbane Roar	27	10	4	13	42	43	−1	34	Qualification for Finals series
7	Perth Glory (Note: Perth Glory disqualified from the Finals series and given a compulsory 7th-place finish due to salary cap violations.)	27	14	8	5	45	35	+10	50	
8	Central Coast Mariners	27	5	8	14	26	50	−24	23	
9	Western Sydney Wanderers	27	4	6	17	29	44	−15	18	
10	Newcastle Jets	27	3	8	16	23	55	−32	17	

Source: A-League
Rules for classification: 1) points; 2) goal difference; 3) number of goals scored.
(C) Champions

===== HAL results and position per round =====
Round	1	2	3	4	5	6	7	8	9	10	11	12	13	14	15	16	17	18	19	20	21	22	23	24	25	26	27
Ground	H	A	H	A	H	A	A	H	A	A	H	A	H	A	H	A	A	H	A	H	A	H	A	H	A	H	H
Result	L	L	L	W	L	W	L	D	L	W	L	D	D	L	W	W	W	L	D	W	L	L	L	W	W	L	W
Position	7	9	9	9	10	8	8	8	7	6	7	7	7	7	7	7	6	6	7	6	7	7	7	7	7	7	6

Updated to match(es) played on 24 April 2015. Source: Matches
A = Away; H = Home; W = Win; D = Draw; L = Loss

===== HAL League goalscorers per round =====
Correct as of 24 April 2015.
* Round 4 was actually played after Round 8, Round 11 after Round 22 and Round 18 after round 25

Total	Player		Goals per Round																										
Total	Player		1	2	3	4	5	6	7	8	9	10	11	12	13	14	15	16	17	18	19	20	21	22	23	24	25	26	27
8	(Brazil)	Henrique		1		1		3		1		1											1						
6	(Costa Rica)	Jean Carlos Solórzano												2			1	1	1		1								
5	(Australia)	Steven Lustica						1															1			3			
5	(Serbia)	Andrija Kaluđerović																	1				1	1		1	1		
4	(Australia)	Brandon Borrello					1										1					1				1			
3	Goal	Own goal											1					1									1		
2	(Australia)	James Donachie												1			1												
2	(Australia)	Matt McKay																		1	1								
1	(Germany)	Thomas Broich	1																										
1	(North Macedonia)	Mensur Kurtiši		1																									
1	(Australia)	Dimitri Petratos																					1						
1	(Australia)	Devante Clut																								1			
1	(Australia)	Jack Hingert																									1		
1	(Australia)	Kofi Danning																											1
1	(Australia)	Lachlan Jackson																											1
42	TOTAL		1	2	0	1	1	4	0	1	0	1	1	3	0	0	3	2	2	1	2	1	4	1	0	6	3	0	2

Goal scored from a penalty kick Two goals scored from penalty kicks Player suspended Player injured/sick
Player on international duty Player was unused sub Player not in match-day squad

==== AFC Champions League ====
===== ACL results summary =====
Overall								Home						Away					
Pld	W	D	L	GF	GA	GD	Pts	W	D	L	GF	GA	GD	W	D	L	GF	GA	GD
5	2	1	2	6	7	−1	7	0	1	1	3	4	−1	2	0	1	3	3	0

Last updated: 21 April 2015.
Source: Competitive matches

===== ACL ladder =====
Pos	Team	Pld	W	D	L	GF	GA	GD	Pts	Qualification	BJG	SSB	BRI	URA
1	(China) Beijing Guoan	6	3	2	1	6	3	+3	11	Advance to knockout stage	—	1–0	0–1	2–0
2	(South Korea) Suwon Samsung Bluewings	6	3	2	1	11	8	+3	11	Advance to knockout stage	1–1	—	3–1	2–1
3	(Australia) Brisbane Roar	6	2	1	3	7	9	−2	7		0–1	3–3	—	1–2
4	(Japan) Urawa Red Diamonds	6	1	1	4	5	9	−4	4		1–1	1–2	0–1	—

Source: AFC
Rules for classification: Group stage tiebreakers

===== ACL results and position per round =====
Round	1	2	3	4	5	6
Ground	H	A	H	A	A	H
Result	L	W	D	L	W	L
Position	4	3	3	3	3	3

Updated to match(es) played on 5 May 2015. Source: Matches
A = Away; H = Home; W = Win; D = Draw; L = Loss

===== ACL League Goalscorers per Round =====
Correct as of 5 May 2015.

Total	Player		Goals per Round					
Total	Player		1	2	3	4	5	6
2	(Australia)	Brandon Borrello		1	1			
2	(Australia)	Devante Clut			2			
2	(Serbia)	Andrija Kaluđerović					1	1
1	(Australia)	Luke DeVere				1		
7	TOTAL		0	1	3	1	1	1

Goal scored from a penalty kick Two goals scored from penalty kicks Player suspended Player injured/sick
Player on international duty Player was unused sub Player not in match-day squad

=== Technical staff ===
Position	Name
Manager	(Netherlands) Frans Thijssen
Assistant Manager	(Wales) Jeff Hopkins
Assistant Manager	(Australia) Rado Vidosic
Goalkeeping Coach	(Australia) Jason Kearton
Strength & Conditioning Coach	(Scotland) Ken Stead
Physiotherapist	(Australia) Tim Oostenbroek

== See also ==
- Brisbane Roar FC records and statistics
- List of Brisbane Roar FC players
- Brisbane Roar end of season awards
- Brisbane Roar website
- A-League website
- National Youth League website

== Awards ==
- NAB Young Footballer of the Month (March) – Brandon Borrello
