= 2014–15 Sydney FC season =

Sydney FC
2014–15 season
- Chairman: Scott Barlow
- Manager: Graham Arnold
- Stadium: Allianz Stadium, Sydney
- A-League: 2nd
- A-League Finals Series: Runners-up
- FFA Cup: Quarter-finals
- Top goalscorer: League: Marc Janko (16); All: Marc Janko (16)
- Highest home attendance: 41,213 vs Western Sydney Wanderers; 18 October 2014
- Lowest home attendance: 11,280 vs Perth Glory; 4 December 2014
- Average home league attendance: 18,076
Home colours	Away colours

The 2014–15 Sydney FC season was the club's 10th season since its establishment in 2004. The club participated in the A-League for the 10th time and the FFA Cup for the first time.

== Players ==
=== Squad ===
Note: Flags indicate national team as defined under FIFA eligibility rules; some limited exceptions apply. Players may hold more than one non-FIFA nationality.

No.	Pos.	Nation	Player
1	GK	AUS	Ivan Necevski
2	DF	AUS	Sebastian Ryall
3	DF	AUS	Saša Ognenovski
5	DF	AUS	Matthew Jurman
6	DF	SRB	Nikola Petković
7	FW	AUS	Corey Gameiro
8	MF	SRB	Miloš Dimitrijević
9	FW	NZL	Shane Smeltz
11	FW	AUS	Bernie Ibini (on loan from Shanghai SIPG)
12	MF	AUS	Hagi Gligor
14	FW	AUS	Alex Brosque (captain)

No.	Pos.	Nation	Player
16	DF	AUS	Alex Gersbach
17	MF	AUS	Terry Antonis
18	MF	AUS	Peter Triantis
19	MF	AUS	Nick Carle
20	GK	AUS	Vedran Janjetović
21	FW	AUT	Marc Janko
22	MF	IRQ	Ali Abbas
23	MF	AUS	Rhyan Grant
26	DF	SEN	Jacques Faty
27	MF	SEN	Mickaël Tavares
34	MF	AUS	Robert Stambolziev

=== From youth squad ===
Note: Flags indicate national team as defined under FIFA eligibility rules; some limited exceptions apply. Players may hold more than one non-FIFA nationality.

No.	Pos.	Nation	Player
13	MF	AUS	Chris Naumoff
24	DF	AUS	George Timotheou
25	DF	AUS	Aaron Calver

No.	Pos.	Nation	Player
29	FW	AUS	George Blackwood
30	GK	AUS	Anthony Bouzanis

=== Transfers in ===
No.	Pos.	Nat.	Name	Age	Moving from	Type	Transfer window	Ends	Transfer fee	Source
11	FW	(Australia)	Bernie Ibini-Isei	21	Shanghai Dongya (China)	Loan	Pre-season	2015		
9	FW	(New Zealand)	Shane Smeltz	32	Perth Glory	Transfer	Pre-season	2015		
14	FW	(Australia)	Alex Brosque	30	Al-Ain (United Arab Emirates)	Transfer	Pre-season	2016		
16	DF	(Australia)	Alex Gersbach	17	AIS Football Program	Transfer	Pre-season	2016		
21	FW	(Austria)	Marc Janko	31	Trabzonspor (Turkey)	Transfer	Pre-season	2016		
27	MF	(Senegal)	Mickaël Tavares	32	Mladá Boleslav (Czech Republic)	Transfer	Mid-season	2015		
26	DF	(Senegal)	Jacques Faty	30	Wuhan Zall (China)	Transfer	Mid-season	2015		
34	MF	(Australia)	Robert Stambolziev	24	Niki Volos (Greece)	Injury Replacement	Mid-season	2015		

=== Transfers out ===
No.	Pos.	Nat.	Name	Age	Moving to	Type	Transfer window	Transfer fee	Source
7	MF	(Australia)	Brett Emerton	47		Retired	Pre-season		
15	MF	(Northern Ireland)	Terry McFlynn	45		Retired	Pre-season		
10	FW	(Italy)	Alessandro Del Piero	52	Delhi Dynamos (India)	End of contract	Pre-season		
11	FW	(Australia)	Richard Garcia	45	Minnesota United (United States)	End of contract	Pre-season	Free	
3	DF	(Australia)	Marc Warren	34	APIA Leichhardt Tigers	Transfer	Pre-season		
12	FW	(Australia)	Blake Powell	35	APIA Leichhardt Tigers	Transfer	Pre-season		
14	FW	(Australia)	Mitch Mallia	22	Blacktown City	Transfer	Pre-season		
16	FW	(Australia)	Joel Chianese	24	Sydney United 58	Transfer	Pre-season		
4	FW	(Serbia)	Ranko Despotović	31	Alavés (Spain)	Transfer	Pre-season		
4	DF	(Australia)	Pedj Bojić	30		Released	Mid-season		
29	FW	(Australia)	Max Burgess	20	Newcastle Jets	Transfer	Mid-season	Free	

== Technical staff ==
Position	Name
Manager	(Australia) Graham Arnold
Assistant manager	(Australia) Rado Vidošić
Youth Team Manager	(Australia) Steve Corica
Goalkeeping coach	(Australia) Zeljko Kalac
Strength & Conditioning Coach	(Australia) Andrew Clark
Physiotherapist	(Australia) Stan Ivancic

== Statistics ==
=== Squad statistics ===
N	Pos.	Nat.	Name	Total					A-League					FFA Cup
N	Pos.	Nat.	Name	Apps	Goals	Yellow card	Second yellow card	Red card	Apps	Goals	Yellow card	Second yellow card	Red card	Apps	Goals	Yellow card	Second yellow card	Red card
1	GK	(Australia)	Ivan Necevski	1	0	0	0	0	0	0	0	0	0	1	0	0	0	0
2	DF	(Australia)	Sebastian Ryall	29	0	10	0	0	26	0	9	0	0	3	0	1	0	0
3	DF	(Australia)	Saša Ognenovski	7	2	2	0	0	6	2	2	0	0	1	0	0	0	0
5	DF	(Australia)	Matthew Jurman	17	1	2	0	0	14+1	1	2	0	0	1+1	0	0	0	0
6	DF	(Serbia)	Nikola Petković	29	2	3	0	1	26	2	3	0	0	3	0	0	0	1
7	FW	(Australia)	Corey Gameiro	8	3	3	0	0	5	2	0	0	0	2+1	1	3	0	0
8	MF	(Serbia)	Miloš Dimitrijević	29	2	2	1	0	28	2	2	1	0	1	0	0	0	0
9	FW	(New Zealand)	Shane Smeltz	21	8	1	0	1	8+11	8	1	0	1	1+1	0	0	0	0
11	FW	(Australia)	Bernie Ibini	30	7	4	0	0	28	7	3	0	0	2	0	1	0	0
12	MF	(Australia)	Hagi Gligor	5	0	0	0	0	1+2	0	0	0	0	2	0	0	0	0
13	MF	(Australia)	Chris Naumoff	27	4	0	0	0	14+10	2	0	0	0	2+1	2	0	0	0
14	FW	(Australia)	Alex Brosque	27	10	4	0	0	25	9	4	0	0	1+1	1	0	0	0
16	DF	(Australia)	Alex Gersbach	23	0	6	0	0	16+5	0	6	0	0	1+1	0	0	0	0
17	MF	(Australia)	Terry Antonis	22	2	3	0	0	13+6	2	2	0	0	1+2	0	1	0	0
18	MF	(Australia)	Peter Triantis	10	0	2	0	0	1+7	0	2	0	0	2	0	0	0	0
19	MF	(Australia)	Nick Carle	7	0	2	0	0	1+4	0	2	0	0	2	0	0	0	0
20	GK	(Australia)	Vedran Janjetović	31	0	2	0	0	29	0	1	0	0	2	0	1	0	0
21	FW	(Austria)	Marc Janko	25	16	5	0	0	23+1	16	5	0	0	1	0	0	0	0
22	MF	(Iraq)	Ali Abbas	10	3	1	0	0	6+1	0	1	0	0	3	3	0	0	0
23	MF	(Australia)	Rhyan Grant	19	1	4	0	0	8+11	1	4	0	0	0	0	0	0	0
25	DF	(Australia)	Aaron Calver	9	0	1	0	0	6+3	0	1	0	0	0	0	0	0	0
26	DF	(Senegal)	Jacques Faty	10	1	3	0	1	10	1	3	0	1	0	0	0	0	0
27	DF	(Senegal)	Mickaël Tavares	12	0	2	1	0	12	0	2	1	0	0	0	0	0	0
29	FW	(Australia)	George Blackwood	3	0	0	0	0	1+2	0	0	0	0	0	0	0	0	0
34	MF	(Australia)	Robert Stambolziev	9	1	0	0	0	0+9	1	0	0	0	0	0	0	0	0
Players no longer at the club:
4	DF	(Australia)	Pedj Bojić	10	0	1	0	0	5+2	0	1	0	0	2+1	0	0	0	0
29	FW	(Australia)	Max Burgess	1	0	0	0	0	0+1	0	0	0	0	0	0	0	0	0

- Last updated: 17 May 2015
- Source: au.soccerway.com
- (yellow card) = Number of bookings; (second yellow card) = Number of sending offs after a second yellow card; (red card) = Number of sending offs by a direct red card.

== Preseason and friendlies ==
Sydney kicked off their pre-season campaign, playing a friendly against NPL NSW 2 team Macarthur Rams. They then took part in a tournament against Premier League teams Newcastle United and West Ham in New Zealand in late July. In late August they travelled to North Queensland to compete in the 2014 Townsville Football Cup during which they took on fellow A-League teams Brisbane Roar and Newcastle Jets as well as hosts Northern Fury.

16 July 2014 Friendly	Macarthur Rams	1–5	Sydney FC	Sydney, Australia
19:30 AEST	Agyei-Danso 69'	Report	Duschesne 19' (o.g.); Gameiro 33', 38'; Carle 58'; Antoniou 87'	Stadium: Campbelltown Stadium

22 July 2014 United Tour	Newcastle United (England)	4–0	(Australia) Sydney FC	Dunedin, New Zealand
19:30 NZDT	de Jong 19'; Rivière 26'; Yanga-Mbiwa 33'; Armstrong 83'	Report		Stadium: Forsyth Barr Stadium

26 July 2014 United Tour	Sydney FC (Australia)	3–1	(England) West Ham United	Wellington, New Zealand
14:00 NZDT	Gameiro 4', 65'; Brosque 26'		Petković 50' (o.g.)	Stadium: Westpac Stadium

6 August 2014 Friendly	Bonnyrigg White Eagles	2–3	(Australia) Sydney FC	Sydney, Australia
19:30 AEST	Younis 37'; Edosomwan 62'	Report	Gameiro 59', 65'; Burgess 74'	Stadium: Leichhardt Oval; Attendance: 2,190; Referee: Kurt Ams

24 August 2014 Townsville Football Cup	Sydney FC	3–1	Northern Fury	Townsville, Australia
14:00 AEST	Petković 3'; Gameiro 67', 76'	Report	Fraser 73' (pen.)	Stadium: Townsville Sports Reserve; Attendance: 1,000; Referee: Alan Milliner

27 August 2014 Townsville Football Cup	Newcastle Jets	2–4	Sydney FC	Townsville, Australia
19:30 AEST	J.Griffiths 44'; Montaño 61'; Jerónimo (red card) 69'	Report	Abbas 34' (pen.), 66' (pen.); Brosque 40'; Gameiro 42'	Stadium: Townsville Sports Reserve; Referee: Alan Milliner

30 August 2014 Townsville Football Cup	Sydney FC	2–0	Brisbane Roar	Townsville, Australia
20:00 AEST	Gameiro 25'; Janko 75'	Report		Stadium: Townsville Sports Reserve; Referee: Matthew Skinner

10 September 2014 Friendly	Canberra FC	0–5	Sydney FC	Canberra, Australia
19:00 AEST		Report	Abbas 5'; Ibini 7'; Gameiro 45'; Brosque 74'; Carle 85'	Stadium: Deakin Stadium; Referee: Matthew Cropper

19 September 2014 Friendly	Sydney FC	0–0	Wellington Phoenix	Wollongong, Australia
19:30 AEST		Report		Stadium: WIN Stadium; Referee: Strebre Delovski

28 September 2014 Friendly	Melbourne Victory	1–1	Sydney FC	Hobart, Australia
15:00 AEST	Ben Khalfallah 89'	Report	Janko 20'	Stadium: North Hobart Oval; Attendance: 6,520; Referee: Shaun Evans

30 May 2015 Friendly	Sydney FC (Australia)	0–1	(England) Tottenham Hotspur	Sydney, Australia
19:30 AEST		Report	Kane 43'	Stadium: ANZ Stadium; Attendance: 71,549; Referee: Minhu Lee

2 June 2015 Friendly	Sydney FC (Australia)	0–1	(England) Chelsea	Sydney, Australia
19:30 AEST			Rémy 30'	Stadium: ANZ Stadium; Attendance: 83,598

== Competitions ==
=== Overall ===
Competition	Started round	Final position / round	First match	Last match
A-League	—	2nd	11 October 2014	26 April 2015
A-League Finals	Semi-finals	Runners-up	9 May 2015	17 May 2015
FFA Cup	Round of 32	Quarter-finals	12 August 2014	21 October 2014

=== A-League ===
==== League table ====
Pos	Team	Pld	W	D	L	GF	GA	GD	Pts	Qualification
1	Melbourne Victory (C)	27	15	8	4	56	31	+25	53	Qualification for 2016 AFC Champions League group stage and Finals series
2	Sydney FC	27	14	8	5	52	35	+17	50	Qualification for 2016 AFC Champions League group stage and Finals series
3	Adelaide United	27	14	4	9	47	32	+15	46	Qualification for 2016 AFC Champions League qualifying play-off and Finals series
4	Wellington Phoenix (Note: Wellington Phoenix cannot qualify for the AFC Champions League as they are not recognised as an AFC club.)	27	14	4	9	45	35	+10	46	Qualification for Finals series
5	Melbourne City	27	9	8	10	36	41	−5	35	Qualification for Finals series
6	Brisbane Roar	27	10	4	13	42	43	−1	34	Qualification for Finals series
7	Perth Glory (Note: Perth Glory disqualified from the Finals series and given a compulsory 7th-place finish due to salary cap violations.)	27	14	8	5	45	35	+10	50	
8	Central Coast Mariners	27	5	8	14	26	50	−24	23	
9	Western Sydney Wanderers	27	4	6	17	29	44	−15	18	
10	Newcastle Jets	27	3	8	16	23	55	−32	17	

Source: A-League
Rules for classification: 1) points; 2) goal difference; 3) number of goals scored.
(C) Champions

==== Results summary ====
Overall								Home						Away					
Pld	W	D	L	GF	GA	GD	Pts	W	D	L	GF	GA	GD	W	D	L	GF	GA	GD
27	14	8	5	52	35	+17	50	4	4	5	19	21	−2	10	4	0	33	14	+19

Last updated: 26 April 2015.
Source: ultimatealeague.com

==== Results by round ====
Round	1	2	3	4	5	6	7	8	9	10	11	12	13	14	15	16	17	18	19	20	21	22	23	24	25	26	27
Ground	H	H	A	H	A	H	A	A	H	A	H	H	A	H	A	A	H	H	A	A	H	H	A	H	A	A	A
Result	D	W	W	W	D	D	W	D	L	D	L	L	D	D	W	W	D	W	W	W	W	L	W	L	W	W	W
Position	5	3	2	2	3	4	4	4	5	5	5	5	5	5	5	5	5	5	5	3	2	3	3	5	2	2	2

Source: ultimatealeague.com
A = Away; H = Home; W = Win; D = Draw; L = Loss

==== Matches ====
11 October 2014 1	Sydney FC	1–1	Melbourne City	Sydney
19:30	Gameiro 54'	Report	Villa 72'	Stadium: Allianz Stadium; Attendance: 25,525; Referee: Peter Green

18 October 2014 2	Sydney FC	3–2	Western Sydney Wanderers	Sydney
19:30	Gameiro 45+1'; Ognenovski 49'; Brosque 79'	Report	Bridge 19'; Janjetović 24' (o.g.); Saba (red card) 69'	Stadium: Allianz Stadium; Attendance: 41,213; Referee: Kris Griffiths-Jones

24 October 2014 3	Brisbane Roar	0–2	Sydney FC	Brisbane
19:00		Report	Janko 28'; Dimitrijević 54'	Stadium: Suncorp Stadium; Attendance: 14,141; Referee: Peter Green

2 November 2014 4	Sydney FC	2–0	Central Coast Mariners	Sydney
17:00	Antonis 21'; Ognenovski 25'	Report		Stadium: Allianz Stadium; Attendance: 17,761; Referee: Strebre Delovski

7 November 2014 5	Adelaide United	0–0	Sydney FC	Adelaide
19:45		Report		Stadium: Coopers Stadium; Attendance: 16,015; Referee: Alan Milliner

15 November 2014 6	Sydney FC	0–0	Melbourne Victory	Sydney
19:30		Report		Stadium: Allianz Stadium; Attendance: 21,242; Referee: Peter Green

22 November 2014 7	Melbourne City	1–2	Sydney FC	Melbourne
7:30	Paartalu 88'	Report	Janko 10', 83'; Dimitrijević (yellow card) 70' (yellow-red card) 89'	Stadium: AAMI Park; Attendance: 9,474; Referee: Kris Griffiths-Jones

29 November 2014 8	Western Sydney Wanderers	1–1	Sydney FC	Sydney
19:30	Juric 30'	Report	Ibini 34'	Stadium: Pirtek Stadium; Attendance: 19,138; Referee: Peter Green

4 December 2014 9	Sydney FC	1–2	Perth Glory	Sydney
19:30	Smeltz 57' (pen.)	Report	R. Griffiths 83'; Keogh 87' (pen.)	Stadium: Allianz Stadium; Attendance: 11,280; Referee: Alan Milliner

13 December 2014 10	Melbourne Victory	3–3	Sydney FC	Melbourne
19:30	Thompson 23', 47', 79'	Report	Janko 17'; Smeltz 51', 76'	Stadium: Ethihad Stadium; Attendance: 25,203; Referee: Peter Green

21 December 2014 11	Sydney FC	0–2	Wellington Phoenix	Sydney
17:00		Report	Burns 73', 81'	Stadium: Allianz Stadium; Attendance: 14,672; Referee: Shaun Evans

26 December 2014 12	Sydney FC	0–3	Adelaide United	Sydney
19:40		Report	Djite 67'; Sánchez 81'; Mabil 90+1'	Stadium: Allianz Stadium; Attendance: 14,214; Referee: Jarred Gillett

30 December 2014 13	Brisbane Roar	0–0	Sydney FC	Brisbane
19:00		Report		Stadium: Suncorp Stadium; Attendance: 15,765; Referee: Chris Beath

3 January 2015 14	Sydney FC	0–0	Newcastle Jets	Wollongong
19:30		Report		Stadium: WIN Stadium; Attendance: 11,733; Referee: Lucien Laverdure

24 January 2015 15	Central Coast Mariners	1–5	Sydney FC	Gosford
19:30	Major 66'	Report	Janko 16', 47'; Naumoff 18'; Ibini 44'; Brosque 72'	Stadium: Central Coast Stadium; Attendance: 12,102; Referee: Jarred Gillett

7 February 2015 16	Perth Glory	1–3	Sydney FC	Perth
6:45	Djulbic (red card) 36'; Kramar 73'	Report	Janko 30'; Faty (red card) 36'; Dimitrijević 69'; Petković (yellow card) 29' (yellow-red card) 71'; Ibini 89'	Stadium: nib Stadium; Attendance: 11,637; Referee: Kris Griffiths-Jones

14 February 2015 17	Sydney FC	3–3	Melbourne Victory	Sydney
19:30	Janko 8' (pen.); Smeltz 73', 85'	Report	Barbarouses 34'; Finkler 41'; Ansell 78'	Stadium: Allianz Stadium; Attendance: 17,356; Referee: Strebre Delovski

21 February 2015 18	Sydney FC	4–2	Central Coast Mariners	Sydney
17:00	Janko 14', 90+2'; Grant 68'; Smeltz 81'	Report	F. Ferreira 45+1', 58'	Stadium: Allianz Stadium; Attendance: 14,239; Referee: Matthew Conger

28 February 2015 19	Western Sydney Wanderers	3–4	Sydney FC	Sydney
19:30	La Rocca 33'; Bulut 42', 53'	Report	Covic 10' (o.g.); Janko 18', 24'; Antonis 75'; Tavares (yellow card) 32' (yellow-red card) 82'	Stadium: Pirtek Stadium; Attendance: 19,484; Referee: Chris Beath

6 March 2015 20	Newcastle Jets	0–1	Sydney FC	Newcastle
19:40		Report	Janko 68'	Stadium: Hunter Stadium; Attendance: 8,783; Referee: Matthew Conger

15 March 2015 21	Sydney FC	5–4	Brisbane Roar	Sydney
17:00	Jurman 7'; Janko 38' (pen.), 52', 76' (pen.); Brosque 89'	Report	Henrique 5'; Kaluđerović 79' (pen.); Lustica 84'; Petratos 90'	Stadium: Allianz Stadium; Attendance: 13,818; Referee: Kris Griffiths-Jones

20 March 2015 22	Sydney FC	0–1	Melbourne City	Sydney
19:40		Report	J. Brown 80'	Stadium: Allianz Stadium; Attendance: 11,638; Referee: Chris Beath

29 March 2015 23	Wellington Phoenix	0–3	Sydney FC	Wellington
17:00	Riera (yellow card) 21' (yellow-red card) 68'	Report	Faty 9'; Smeltz 28' (red card) 70'; Muscat 40' (o.g.)	Stadium: Westpac Stadium; Attendance: 6,236; Referee: Peter Green

4 April 2015 24	Sydney FC	0–1	Adelaide United	Sydney
19:30		Report	Mabil 82'	Stadium: Allianz Stadium; Attendance: 11,585; Referee: Chris Beath

10 April 2015 25	Perth Glory	0–3	Sydney FC	Perth
19:45		Report	Brosque 35', 65'; Ibini 60'	Stadium: nib Stadium; Attendance: 7,426; Referee: Kris Griffiths-Jones

17 April 2015 26	Newcastle Jets	3–4	Sydney FC	Newcastle
19:45	Alivodić 21'; Montaño 67'; Hoole 76' (pen.)	Report	Brosque 48', 56'; Ibini 52'; Stambolziev 80'	Stadium: Hunter Stadium; Attendance: 8,125; Referee: Peter Green

26 April 2015 27	Wellington Phoenix	1–2	Sydney FC	Wellington
17:00	Boxall 46'	Report	Ibini 14'; Smeltz 32' (pen.)	Stadium: Westpac Stadium; Attendance: 13,248; Referee: Strebre Delovski

==== Finals series ====
9 May 2015 Semi-finals	Sydney FC	4–1	Adelaide United	Sydney
19:30 AEST	Ibini 19'; Brosque 45+1', 47'; Naumoff 90'	Report	Goodwin 74'	Stadium: Allianz Stadium; Attendance: 26,783; Referee: Ben Williams

17 May 2015 Grand Final	Melbourne Victory	3–0	Sydney FC	Melbourne
Sunday 16:00 AEST	Berisha 33'; Barbarouses 83'; Valeri (yellow card) 67' (yellow-red card) 88'; Broxham 90'	Report		Stadium: AAMI Park; Attendance: 29,843; Referee: Jarred Gillett

=== FFA Cup ===
12 August 2014 Round of 32	Melbourne City	1–3 (a.e.t.)	Sydney FC	Ballarat
19:30 AEST	Kalmar 65'; Hoffman (red card) 109'	Report	Gameiro 23'; Abbas 111' (pen.), 114' (pen.)	Stadium: Morshead Park Stadium; Attendance: 2,801; Referee: Shaun Evans

23 September 2014 Round of 16	Sydney United 58 (New South Wales)	1–3	Sydney FC	Sydney
19:30 AEST	Paric 45'	Report	Naumoff 23', 60'; Abbas 90+1'	Stadium: Sydney United Sports Centre; Attendance: 8,125; Referee: Kris Griffiths-Jones

21 October 2014 Quarter final	Sydney FC	1–3 (a.e.t.)	Adelaide United	Sydney
19:30 AEDT	Brosque 51'; Petković (red card) 87'	Report	Cirio 28'; Djite 99', 111'	Stadium: Allianz Stadium; Attendance: 3,536; Referee: Ben Williams

== Awards ==
- Wingate Townsville Football Cup Champions
- NAB Young Footballer of the Month (October) – Terry Antonis

== End-of-season awards ==
On 28 April 2015, Sydney FC hosted their annual Sky Blue Ball and presented eight awards on the night.

Award	Men's	Women's	Youth
Player of the Year	Milos Dimitrijevic	N/A	
Player's Player of the Year	Milos Dimitrijevic	Jasmyne Spencer	George Blackwood
Member's Player of the Year	Milos Dimitrijevic	N/A	
Golden Boot	Marc Janko	N/A	George Blackwood
Chairman's Award	Stan Ivancic (Head physiotherapist) and Joe Niutta (Equipment Manager)		
