= 2014 Townsville Football Cup =

2014 Wingate Properties Townsville Football Cup

Tournament details
- Host country: Australia
- Dates: 24 August – 30 August 2014
- Teams: 4 + 1
- Venue: 1 (in 1 host city)

Final positions
- Champions: (Australia) Sydney FC (1st title)
- Runners-up: (Australia) Brisbane Roar

Tournament statistics
- Matches played: 6
- Goals scored: 24 (4 per match)
- Attendance: 16,000 (2,667 per match)

The 2014 Townsville Football Cup was a friendly association football tournament played in the Townsville, Australia. It began on Sunday, 24 August 2014, and ended on Saturday, 30 August 2014. The participating teams were Sydney FC, Brisbane Roar, Newcastle Jets and Northern Fury. The Northern Fury team were unable to play their final fixture (due to having a National Premier Leagues Queensland match scheduled the next day in Brisbane) and were replaced by a composite North Queensland All Stars team.

== Teams ==
Team	Location	League
Brisbane Roar	Brisbane	A-League
Newcastle Jets	Newcastle	A-League
Northern Fury	Townsville	NPL Queensland
Sydney FC	Sydney	A-League
North Queensland All Stars	North Queensland	None

== Venue ==
Australia
Townsville
Townsville Sports Reserve
Capacity: 6,500
19°14′59″S 146°48′29″E

== Table ==
Team	Pld	W	D	L	GF	GA	GD	Pts
Sydney FC	3	3	0	0	9	3	+6	9
Brisbane Roar	3	2	0	1	9	3	+6	6
Newcastle Jets	3	1	0	2	5	8	−3	3
Northern Fury/North Queensland All Stars	3	0	0	3	2	11	−5	0

=== Matches ===
24 August 2014
14:00 AEST

Sydney FC	3 – 1	Northern Fury
Petković 3'; Gameiro 67', 76'	Report	Fraser 73' (pen.)

Townsville Sports Reserve, Townsville, Australia
Attendance: 1,000
Referee: Alan Milliner

24 August 2014
17:00 AEST

Brisbane Roar	4 – 0	Newcastle Jets
Petratos 6'; Henrique 40' (pen.); Miller 75'; Brady 86'	Report

Townsville Sports Reserve, Townsville, Australia
Attendance: 1,000

27 August 2014
17:30 AEST

Northern Fury	1 – 5	Brisbane Roar
J. Crowley 49'	Report	Brown 18' (pen.); Kurtiši 54', 63', 80'; Danning 55'

Townsville Sports Reserve, Townsville
Attendance: 3,000

27 August 2014
19:30 AEST

Newcastle Jets	2 – 4	Sydney FC
J. Griffiths 44'; Montaño 61'	Report	Abbas 34' (pen.), 66' (pen.); Brosque 40'; Gameiro 42'

Townsville Sports Reserve, Townsville, Australia
Attendance: 3,000
Referee: Alan Milliner

30 August 2014
17:00 AEST

Newcastle Jets	3 – 0	North Queensland All Stars
Neville 16'; Goodwin 34'; Griffiths 88'	Report

Townsville Sports Reserve, Townsville, Australia
Attendance: 4,000
Referee: Alex King

30 August 2014
20:00 AEST

Sydney FC	2 – 0	Brisbane Roar
Gameiro 25'; Janko 75'	Report

Townsville Sports Reserve, Townsville, Australia
Attendance: 4,000
Referee: Matthew Skinner
