= 2014–15 A-League =

38th season of top-tier soccer league in Australia

A-League
- Season: 2014–15
- Dates: 10 October 2014 – 17 May 2015
- Champions: Melbourne Victory (3rd title)
- Premiers: Melbourne Victory (3rd title)
- Champions League: Melbourne Victory; Sydney FC; Adelaide United
- Matches: 135
- Goals: 401 (2.97 per match)
- Top goalscorer: Marc Janko (16 goals)
- Best goalkeeper: Eugene Galekovic
- Biggest home win: Adelaide United 7–0 Newcastle Jets (24 January 2015)
- Biggest away win: Newcastle Jets 0–4 Brisbane Roar (14 November 2014); Central Coast Mariners 1–5 Sydney FC (24 January 2015)
- Highest scoring: Sydney FC 5–4 Brisbane Roar (15 March 2015)
- Longest winning run: Perth Glory; Wellington Phoenix (4)
- Longest unbeaten run: Melbourne Victory; Perth Glory (10)
- Longest winless run: Western Sydney Wanderers (13)
- Longest losing run: Brisbane Roar; Western Sydney Wanderers (4)
- Highest attendance: 43,729
- Lowest attendance: 4,162
- Average attendance: 12,514 ( 527)

The 2014–15 A-League was the 38th season of top-flight soccer in Australia, and the 10th season of the A-League since its establishment in 2004. Brisbane Roar were both the defending A-League Premiers and Champions. The regular season commenced on 10 October 2014 and concluded on 26 April 2015. The 2015 Grand Final took place on 17 May 2015. The season was suspended from 9–24 January in order to avoid a clash with the 2015 AFC Asian Cup, which was hosted by Australia.

The 2015 Grand Final took place on 17 May 2015, with Melbourne Victory claiming their third Championship with a 3–0 win against Sydney FC.

The season marked the first year that the team formerly known as Melbourne Heart competed as Melbourne City after the club's renaming in June 2014.

== Clubs ==

Team	City	Home Ground	Capacity
Adelaide United	Adelaide	Coopers Stadium; Adelaide Oval	17,000; 53,583
Brisbane Roar	Brisbane	Suncorp Stadium	52,500
Central Coast Mariners	Gosford	Central Coast Stadium	20,119
Melbourne City	Melbourne	AAMI Park	30,050
Melbourne Victory	Melbourne	Etihad Stadium; AAMI Park	56,347; 30,050
Newcastle Jets	Newcastle	Hunter Stadium	33,000
Perth Glory	Perth	nib Stadium	20,500
Sydney FC	Sydney	Allianz Stadium	45,500
Wellington Phoenix	Wellington	Westpac Stadium	36,000
Western Sydney Wanderers	Sydney	Pirtek Stadium	21,487

=== Personnel and kits ===
Team	Manager	Captain	Kit manufacturer	Kit partner
Adelaide United	(Spain) Josep Gombau	(Australia) Eugene Galekovic	Kappa	Veolia
Brisbane Roar	(Netherlands) Frans Thijssen	(Australia) Matt McKay	Umbro	The Coffee Club
Central Coast Mariners	(England) Tony Walmsley (Head Coach)	(Malta) John Hutchinson (Player/Coach)	Kappa	Masterfoods
Melbourne City	(Netherlands) John van 't Schip	(Australia) Patrick Kisnorbo	Nike	Etihad
Melbourne Victory	(Australia) Kevin Muscat	(Australia) Mark Milligan	Adidas	Community Training Initiatives (h); Oliana Foods (a)
Newcastle Jets	(England) Phil Stubbins	(Australia) Taylor Regan	BLK	Castle Quarry Products
Perth Glory	(England) Kenny Lowe	(Australia) Michael Thwaite	Macron	QBE Insurance
Sydney FC	(Australia) Graham Arnold	(Australia) Alex Brosque	Adidas	Webjet
Wellington Phoenix	(Scotland) Ernie Merrick	(New Zealand) Andrew Durante	Adidas	Huawei
Western Sydney Wanderers	(Australia) Tony Popovic	(Australia) Nikolai Topor-Stanley	Nike	NRMA Insurance

=== Managerial changes ===
Team	Outgoing manager	Manner of departure	Date of vacancy	Table	Incoming manager	Date of appointment
Sydney FC	(Australia) Frank Farina	Sacked	23 April 2014	Pre-season	(Australia) Graham Arnold	8 May 2014
Newcastle Jets	(Australia) Clayton Zane (caretaker)	End of contract	5 May 2014	Pre-season	(England) Phil Stubbins	5 May 2014
Brisbane Roar	(England) Mike Mulvey	Mutual consent	23 November 2014	8th	(Netherlands) Frans Thijssen (caretaker)	24 November 2014
Central Coast Mariners	(Australia) Phil Moss	Sacked	6 March 2015	8th	(England) Tony Walmsley (caretaker head coach) (Malta) John Hutchinson (caretaker player/coach)	6 March 2015

=== Foreign players ===
Club	Visa 1	Visa 2	Visa 3	Visa 4	Visa 5	Non-Visa foreigner(s)	Former player(s)
Adelaide United	(Argentina) Marcelo Carrusca	(Spain) Sergio Cirio	(Spain) Miguel Palanca	(Spain) Isaías	(Spain) Pablo Sánchez		(Brazil) Cássio^{1} (Portugal) Fábio Ferreira
Brisbane Roar	(Costa Rica) Jean Carlos Solórzano	(Germany) Thomas Broich	(Germany) Jérome Polenz	(Serbia) Andrija Kaluđerović		(Brazil) Henrique^{1} (England) Jamie Young^{2} (Sri Lanka) Jack Hingert^{2}	(Republic of Ireland) Liam Miller (North Macedonia) Mensur Kurtiši
Central Coast Mariners	(Hungary) Richárd Vernes	(Portugal) Fábio Ferreira	(Scotland) Nick Montgomery			(Malta) John Hutchinson^{2} (New Zealand) Storm Roux^{2}	(Senegal) Malick Mané (South Korea) Kim Seung-yong
Melbourne City	(Argentina) Jonatan Germano	(Republic of Ireland) Damien Duff	(Netherlands) Rob Wielaert	(Slovenia) Robert Koren		(Netherlands) Kew Jaliens^{3} (Martinique) Harry Novillo^{3} (Philippines) Iain Ramsay^{2}	(Republic of Ireland) Liam Miller^{3} (Singapore) Safuwan Baharudin (Spain) David Villa^{4}
Melbourne Victory	(Albania) Besart Berisha	(Brazil) Guilherme Finkler	(France) Matthieu Delpierre	(New Zealand) Kosta Barbarouses	(Tunisia) Fahid Ben Khalfallah	(North Macedonia) Daniel Georgievski^{2}	
Newcastle Jets	(Ecuador) Edson Montaño	(South Korea) Lee Ki-Je	(Serbia) Enver Alivodić				(Argentina) Marcos Flores (Argentina) Jerónimo Neumann (Netherlands) Kew Jaliens (Northern Ireland) Jonny Steele
Perth Glory	(Brazil) Sidnei	(Republic of Ireland) Andy Keogh	(Netherlands) Youssouf Hersi	(Serbia) Nebojša Marinković	(Slovenia) Denis Kramar	(Germany) Dragan Paljić^{3}	
Sydney FC	(Austria) Marc Janko	(Senegal) Jacques Faty	(Senegal) Mickaël Tavares	(Serbia) Miloš Dimitrijević	(Serbia) Nikola Petković	(Croatia) Vedran Janjetović^{1} (Iraq) Ali Abbas^{1} (New Zealand) Shane Smeltz^{2}	
Wellington Phoenix	(Costa Rica) Kenny Cunningham	(Fiji) Roy Krishna	(Netherlands) Roly Bonevacia	(Spain) Albert Riera	(Spain) Alex Rodriguez	(Malta) Manny Muscat^{2}	
Western Sydney Wanderers	(Croatia) Mateo Poljak	(Italy) Iacopo La Rocca	(Japan) Yojiro Takahagi	(Japan) Yūsuke Tanaka	(Netherlands) Romeo Castelen		(Brazil) Vítor Saba (Nigeria) Seyi Adeleke

The following do not fill a Visa position:
^{1}Those players who were born and started their professional career abroad but have since gained Australian citizenship (and New Zealand citizenship, in the case of Wellington Phoenix);
^{2}Australian citizens (and New Zealand citizens, in the case of Wellington Phoenix) who have chosen to represent another national team;
^{3}Injury Replacement Players, or National Team Replacement Players;
^{4}Guest Players (eligible to play a maximum of ten games)

=== Salary cap exemptions and captains ===
Club	Domestic Marquee	International Marquee	Captain	Vice-Captain
Adelaide United	(Australia) Eugene Galekovic	(Argentina) Marcelo Carrusca	(Australia) Eugene Galekovic	(Australia) Nigel Boogaard
Brisbane Roar	(Australia) Matt McKay	(Germany) Thomas Broich	(Australia) Matt McKay	(Australia) Shane Stefanutto
Central Coast Mariners	None	None	(Malta) John Hutchinson	(Scotland) Nick Montgomery
Melbourne City	(Australia) Josh Kennedy	(Slovenia) Robert Koren	(Australia) Patrick Kisnorbo	None
Melbourne Victory	(Australia) Mark Milligan	(Albania) Besart Berisha	(Australia) Mark Milligan	(Australia) Leigh Broxham
Newcastle Jets	None	None	(Netherlands) Kew Jaliens (Australia) Taylor Regan (Note: Regan replaced Jaliens as captain mid-season, after his contract was mutually terminated in February 2015.)	(Australia) Joel Griffiths (Note: Griffiths was vice-captain until his contract was mutually terminated mid-season in February 2015.)
Perth Glory	(Australia) Michael Thwaite	(Serbia) Nebojša Marinković	(Australia) Michael Thwaite	None
Sydney FC	(Australia) Alex Brosque	(Austria) Marc Janko	(Australia) Alex Brosque	(Australia) Saša Ognenovski (Serbia) Nikola Petković
Wellington Phoenix	None	None	(New Zealand) Andrew Durante	(New Zealand) Ben Sigmund
Western Sydney Wanderers	(Australia) Matthew Spiranovic	None	(Australia) Nikolai Topor-Stanley	None

== Regular season ==
=== League table ===
Pos	Team	Pld	W	D	L	GF	GA	GD	Pts	Qualification
1	Melbourne Victory (C)	27	15	8	4	56	31	+25	53	Qualification for 2016 AFC Champions League group stage and Finals series
2	Sydney FC	27	14	8	5	52	35	+17	50	Qualification for 2016 AFC Champions League group stage and Finals series
3	Adelaide United	27	14	4	9	47	32	+15	46	Qualification for 2016 AFC Champions League qualifying play-off and Finals series
4	Wellington Phoenix (Note: Wellington Phoenix cannot qualify for the AFC Champions League as they are not recognised as an AFC club.)	27	14	4	9	45	35	+10	46	Qualification for Finals series
5	Melbourne City	27	9	8	10	36	41	−5	35	Qualification for Finals series
6	Brisbane Roar	27	10	4	13	42	43	−1	34	Qualification for Finals series
7	Perth Glory (Note: Perth Glory disqualified from the Finals series and given a compulsory 7th-place finish due to salary cap violations.)	27	14	8	5	45	35	+10	50	
8	Central Coast Mariners	27	5	8	14	26	50	−24	23	
9	Western Sydney Wanderers	27	4	6	17	29	44	−15	18	
10	Newcastle Jets	27	3	8	16	23	55	−32	17	

Source: A-League
Rules for classification: 1) points; 2) goal difference; 3) number of goals scored.
(C) Champions

=== Results ===
Home \ Away	ADE	BRI	CCM	MBC	MVC	NEW	PER	SYD	WEL	WSW	ADE	BRI	CCM	MBC	MVC	NEW	PER	SYD	WEL	WSW
Adelaide United		0–1	2–1	4–1	1–1	7–0	2–0	0–0	2–1	2–0		2–3			2–2		1–1		1–3	2–1
Brisbane Roar	1–2		6–1	1–3	1–2	2–1	1–1	0–2	3–2	1–0					0–1			0–0	1–2	1–4
Central Coast Mariners	0–2	3–3		2–0	0–3	1–0	0–1	1–5	1–2	1–0	2–1	0–2		1–0			1–1			
Melbourne City	1–2	1–0	2–2		1–0	1–1	1–1	1–2	0–0	2–1	3–1	1–0				4–0	0–0			
Melbourne Victory	3–2	1–0	2–1	5–2		1–0	1–2	3–3	2–0	4–1			3–1	3–0		0–1	1–1		2–3	
Newcastle Jets	2–1	0–4	1–1	2–5	2–2		0–2	0–1	1–3	1–1	0–1	1–2	0–0					3–4		
Perth Glory	1–2	3–2	4–1	3–1	3–3	2–1		1–3	2–1	2–1		2–2				2–0		0–3	1–2	3–2
Sydney FC	0–3	5–4	2–0	1–1	0–0	0–0	1–2		0–2	3–2	0–1		4–2	0–1	3–3					
Wellington Phoenix	2–0	3–0	1–1	5–1	0–3	4–1	1–2	0–3		1–0			3–2	0–0		2–2		1–2		1–0
Western Sydney Wanderers	2–1	0–1	0–0	3–2	1–2	1–1	1–2	1–1	2–0				0–0	1–1	0–3	1–2		3–4		

Updated to match(es) played on 26 April 2015. Source: aleague.com.au
Legend: Blue = home team win; Yellow = draw; Red = away team win.

== Finals series ==
Elimination-finals
4	Wellington Phoenix	0
5	Melbourne City	2
3	Adelaide United	2
6	Brisbane Roar	1

Semi-finals
1	Melbourne Victory	3
5	Melbourne City	0
2	Sydney FC	4
4	Adelaide United	1

Grand Final
1	Melbourne Victory	3
2	Sydney FC	0

=== Elimination-finals ===
1 May 2015
19:00 ACST (UTC+09:30)

Adelaide United	2–1	Brisbane Roar
Goodwin 7'; Mabil 87'	Report	Broich 27'

Adelaide Oval, Adelaide
Attendance: 20,155
Referee: Peter Green

3 May 2015
19:00 NZST (UTC+12:00)

Wellington Phoenix	0–2	Melbourne City
	Report	Kennedy 61'; Moss 72' (o.g.)

Westpac Stadium, Wellington
Attendance: 10,171
Referee: Ben Williams

=== Semi-finals ===
8 May 2015
19:30 AEST (UTC+10:00)

Melbourne Victory	3–0	Melbourne City
Berisha 18'; Barbarouses 30'; Thompson 87'	Report

Etihad Stadium, Melbourne
Attendance: 50,873
Referee: Kris Griffiths-Jones

9 May 2015
19:30 AEST (UTC+10:00)

Sydney FC	4–1	Adelaide United
Ibini 19'; Brosque 45+1', 47'; Naumoff 90'	Report	Goodwin 74'

Allianz Stadium, Sydney
Attendance: 26,783
Referee: Ben Williams

=== Grand Final ===
17 May 2015
16:00 AEST (UTC+10:00)

Melbourne Victory	3–0	Sydney FC
Berisha 33'; Barbarouses 83'; Broxham 90'	Report

AAMI Park, Melbourne
Attendance: 29,843
Referee: Jarred Gillett

== Statistics ==
=== Top goalscorers ===
Rank	Player	Club	Goals
1	(Austria) Marc Janko	Sydney FC	16
2	(Australia) Nathan Burns	Wellington Phoenix	14
3	(Albania) Besart Berisha	Melbourne Victory	13
4	(Republic of Ireland) Andy Keogh	Perth Glory	12
5	(Australia) Archie Thompson	Melbourne Victory	10
6	(Fiji) Roy Krishna	Wellington Phoenix	9
6	(Australia) Jamie Maclaren	Perth Glory	9
8	(Brazil) Henrique	Brisbane Roar	8
8	(Spain) Pablo Sánchez	Adelaide United	8
8	(New Zealand) Shane Smeltz	Sydney FC	8

Last updated: 26 April 2015.
Source: ultimatealeague.com

=== Own goals ===
Player	Club	Against	Round
(Australia) James Donachie	Brisbane Roar	Adelaide United	1
(New Zealand) Tom Doyle	Wellington Phoenix	Central Coast Mariners	2
(Australia) Vedran Janjetović	Sydney FC	Western Sydney Wanderers	2
(Australia) Jade North	Brisbane Roar	Melbourne Victory	7
(Australia) Nigel Boogaard	Adelaide United	Melbourne Victory	8
(Spain) Sergio Cirio	Adelaide United	Melbourne Victory	8
(Australia) Allan Welsh	Newcastle Jets	Brisbane Roar	16
(Australia) Ante Covic	Western Sydney Wanderers	Sydney FC	19
(Malta) Manny Muscat	Wellington Phoenix	Sydney FC	23
(Australia) Daniel Bowles	Brisbane Roar	Central Coast Mariners	24
(New Zealand) Andrew Durante	Wellington Phoenix	Melbourne Victory	24
(Australia) Eugene Galekovic	Adelaide United	Brisbane Roar	25

=== Hat-tricks ===
Player	For	Against	Result	Date
(Republic of Ireland) Andy Keogh	Perth Glory	Brisbane Roar	3–2	19 October 2014
(Albania) Besart Berisha	Melbourne Victory	Melbourne City	5–2	25 October 2014
(Brazil) Henrique^{†}	Brisbane Roar	Newcastle Jets	4–0	14 November 2014
(Australia) Nathan Burns	Wellington Phoenix	Melbourne City	5–1	30 November 2014
(Australia) Archie Thompson	Melbourne Victory	Sydney FC	3–3	13 December 2014
(Slovenia) Robert Koren	Melbourne City	Newcastle Jets	5–2	30 December 2014
(Austria) Marc Janko	Sydney FC	Brisbane Roar	5–4	15 March 2015
(Australia) Steven Lustica	Brisbane Roar	Central Coast Mariners	6–1	2 April 2015
(Australia) Jamie Maclaren	Perth Glory	Melbourne City	3–1	19 April 2015

† Player came on as substitute.

=== Clean sheets ===
Rank	Player	Club	Clean sheets
1	(Australia) Vedran Janjetović	Sydney FC	9
2	(Australia) Tando Velaphi	Melbourne City	8
3	(Australia) Nathan Coe	Melbourne Victory	7
3	(Australia) Eugene Galekovic	Adelaide United	7
3	(New Zealand) Glen Moss	Wellington Phoenix	7
3	(Australia) Liam Reddy	Central Coast Mariners	7
7	(England) Jamie Young	Brisbane Roar	5
8	(Australia) Danny Vuković	Perth Glory	4
9	(Australia) Ante Covic	Western Sydney Wanderers	3
9	(Australia) Ben Kennedy	Newcastle Jets	3

Last updated: 26 April 2015.
Source: ultimatealeague.com

NB - Additional clean sheets were kept by Adelaide United and Melbourne Victory, however these are not listed due to goalkeeper substitutions.

=== Attendances ===
==== By club ====
These are the attendance records of each of the teams at the end of the home and away season. The table does not include finals series attendances.

Team	Hosted	Average	High	Low	Total
Melbourne Victory	14	25,388	43,729	18,205	355,436
Sydney FC	13	17,406	41,213	11,280	226,276
Adelaide United	14	12,644	33,126	7,767	177,012
Western Sydney Wanderers	14	12,520	19,484	7,239	175,284
Brisbane Roar	13	11,660	17,131	6,813	151,586
Melbourne City	13	10,374	26,372	5,867	134,859
Perth Glory	14	9,540	12,271	5,821	133,564
Newcastle Jets	13	8,968	11,884	4,162	116,587
Wellington Phoenix	14	8,583	13,248	6,236	120,168
Central Coast Mariners	13	7,585	12,102	4,508	98,605
League total	135	12,514	43,729	4,162	1,689,377

==== By round ====
2014–15 A-League Attendance
Round	Total	Games	Avg. Per Game
Round 1	90,013	5	18,003
Round 2	106,082	5	21,216
Round 3	91,836	5	18,367
Round 4	73,547	5	14,709
Round 5	58,437	5	11,687
Round 6	62,752	5	12,550
Round 7	62,977	5	12,595
Round 8	72,856	5	14,571
Round 9	47,373	5	9,475
Round 10	64,067	5	12,813
Round 11	67,924	5	13,585
Round 12	63,190	5	12,638
Round 13	72,186	5	14,437
Round 14	53,727	5	10,745
Round 15	52,157	5	10,431
Round 16	75,844	5	15,169
Round 17	53,339	5	10,668
Round 18	49,016	5	9,803
Round 19	67,338	5	13,468
Round 20	57,301	5	11,460
Round 21	47,703	5	9,541
Round 22	53,237	5	10,647
Round 23	50,305	5	10,061
Round 24	39,366	5	7,873
Round 25	53,630	5	10,726
Round 26	42,233	5	8,447
Round 27	61,841	5	12,368
Elimination Final	30,326	2	15,163
Semi Final	77,656	2	38,828
Grand Final	29,843	1	29,843

==== Top 10 season attendances ====
Attendance	Round	Date	Home	Score	Away	Venue	Weekday	Time of Day
50,873	SF	8 May 2015	Melbourne Victory	3–0	Melbourne City	Etihad Stadium	Friday	Night
43,729	3	25 October 2014	Melbourne Victory	5–2	Melbourne City	Etihad Stadium	Saturday	Night
41,213	2	18 October 2014	Sydney FC	3–2	Western Sydney Wanderers	Allianz Stadium	Saturday	Night
40,042	16	7 February 2015	Melbourne Victory	3–0	Melbourne City	Etihad Stadium	Saturday	Night
33,126	2	17 October 2014	Adelaide United	1–1	Melbourne Victory	Adelaide Oval	Friday	Night
30,083	1	10 October 2014	Melbourne Victory	4–1	Western Sydney Wanderers	Etihad Stadium	Friday	Night
29,843	GF	17 May 2015	Melbourne Victory	3–0	Sydney FC	AAMI Park	Sunday	Night
26,783	SF	9 May 2015	Sydney FC	4–1	Adelaide United	Allianz Stadium	Saturday	Night
26,372	11	20 December 2014	Melbourne City	1–0	Melbourne Victory	AAMI Park	Saturday	Night
25,525	1	11 October 2014	Sydney FC	1–1	Melbourne City	Allianz Stadium	Saturday	Night

Last updated: 9 May 2015.
Source: ultimatealeague.com

=== Club membership ===
2014–15 A-League membership figures
Club	Members
Adelaide United	9,429
Brisbane Roar	12,113
Central Coast Mariners	6,242
Melbourne City	11,741
Melbourne Victory	24,200
Newcastle Jets	10,003
Perth Glory	6,296
Sydney FC	11,508
Wellington Phoenix	4,183
Western Sydney Wanderers	18,706
Total	114,421
Average	11,442

Last updated: 26 April 2015.
Source: aleague.com.au

== Awards ==
=== End-of-season awards ===
The following end of the season awards were announced at the Hyundai A-League & Westfield W-League 2014–15 Awards night held at the Carriageworks in Sydney on 11 May 2015.

- Johnny Warren Medal – Nathan Burns, Wellington Phoenix
- NAB Young Footballer of the Year – James Jeggo, Adelaide United
- Nike Golden Boot Award – Marc Janko, Sydney FC (16 goals)
- Goalkeeper of the Year – Eugene Galekovic, Adelaide United
- Manager of the Year – Kevin Muscat, Melbourne Victory
- Fair Play Award – Wellington Phoenix
- Referee of the Year – Jarred Gillett
- Goal of the Year – Tarek Elrich, Adelaide United (Adelaide United v Melbourne City, 25 April 2015)
- Joe Marston Medal – Mark Milligan

== See also ==
- 2014–15 Adelaide United FC season
- 2014–15 Brisbane Roar FC season
- 2014–15 Central Coast Mariners FC season
- 2014–15 Melbourne City FC season
- 2014–15 Melbourne Victory FC season
- 2014–15 Newcastle Jets FC season
- 2014–15 Perth Glory FC season
- 2014–15 Sydney FC season
- 2014–15 Wellington Phoenix FC season
- 2014–15 Western Sydney Wanderers FC season
