= Corey Gameiro =

Australian footballer (born 1993)

Personal information
- Full name: Corey James Gameiro
- Date of birth: 7 February 1993 (age 33)
- Place of birth: Port Kembla, Australia
- Height: 1.77 m (5 ft 10 in)
- Position: Forward

Youth career
- 1997–2000: Lake Heights
- 2000–2010: South Coast Wolves
- 2008–2009: Sydney FC

Senior career*
Years	Team	Apps	(Gls)
2008–2010	South Coast Wolves	6	(1)
2011–2013	Fulham	0	(0)
2011	→ Hayes & Yeading (loan)	5	(0)
2012–2013	→ FC Eindhoven (loan)	8	(0)
2012–2013	→ Wellington Phoenix (loan)	7	(1)
2013–2015	Sydney FC	21	(4)
2015–2017	Melbourne City	5	(0)
2017–2018	Brisbane Roar	18	(0)
2018–2019	Central Coast Mariners	0	(0)
2019–2020	St George City	8	(0)
2021	APIA Leichhardt	1	(0)

International career^{‡}
2011–2012	Australia U20	11	(6)
2014	Australia U23	2	(1)
- * Club domestic league appearances and goals as of 9 November 2021 ‡ National team caps and goals as of 19 November 2014

Corey James Gameiro (born 7 February 1993) is an Australian former soccer player who most recently played as a forward.

== Club career ==
=== Fulham ===
Gameiro signed a professional contract with Fulham in August 2009 and he signed a contract extension in May 2012 that saw him remain at Fulham until the summer 2013.

He was one of 12 players released by Fulham at the end of the 2012–13 Premier League season.

==== Loan to Hayes & Yeading United ====
Gameiro was loaned out to Hayes & Yeading for one month on 24 November 2011

==== Loan to Eindhoven ====
The following season, he joined FC Eindhoven on a four-month loan on 31 August 2012. The same day he made his professional debut in the Eerste Divisie, in a match against FC Volendam, coming off the bench in the 64th minute.

==== Loan to Wellington Phoenix ====
Gameiro joined Wellington Phoenix on a loan deal until the end of the 2012-13 A-League season on 9 February 2013.

=== Sydney FC ===
On 28 June 2013, Gameiro signed for A-League team Sydney FC on a two-year deal.

On 3 January 2014, Gameiro scored his first goal for Sydney FC, scoring against Adelaide United with a header from a Nikola Petković free kick.

Gameiro was released by Sydney FC following the 2014–15 A-League season. He rejected Sydney's contract in order to find another team.

=== Melbourne City ===
On 22 June 2015, Melbourne City announced they had recruited Gameiro on a 2-year deal despite injury concerns.

On 1 May 2017, Melbourne City announced Gameiro would not be offered a new contract and effectively released him from the club. Gameiro was injured for the bulk of his time at Melbourne City and played only a handful of games for the club.

=== Brisbane Roar ===
On 4 July 2017, Gamerio joined Brisbane Roar. and played his first game making his debut in a 2–0 preseason win over Sydney F.C. on 16 September 2017. Gameiro announced his delight at returning to football after 22 months saying “He [John Aloisi] was the one who put his hand out to me when I needed it. I really am so thankful and I won't ever let him down because he didn't let me down in my time of need". On 3 May 2018, Gameiro had his contract terminated by mutual consent by Brisbane Roar.

=== Central Coast Mariners ===
Following his release from Brisbane Roar, Gameiro signed a one-year deal with Central Coast Mariners on 8 May 2018. He was released by the club on 22 May 2019 and did not feature in a competitive match for the Mariners.

=== Later career ===
On17 June 2019, Gamerio joined NPL 2 club St George City. After some injuries, he joined APIA Leichhardt on 27 April 2021. He retired and joined Northbridge Bulls as the Technical Director, on 16 September 2021.

== International career ==
Gameiro represented Australia at U19 level at the 2012 AFC U-19 Championship in United Arab Emirates and scored a hat-trick during a match against Jordan, securing a place at the U20 World Cup to be held in Turkey in June 2013. He then represented Australia U20 at the 2013 FIFA U-20 World Cup in Turkey.

== Club statistics ==
As of 18 December 2023

Appearances and goals by club, season and competition
Club	Season	League			National Cup		Other		Total	
Club	Season	Division	Apps	Goals	Apps	Goals	Apps	Goals	Apps	Goals
Hayes & Yeading (loan)	2011–12	National League	5	0	—		1 (Note: Appearance in FA Trophy)	0	6	0
FC Eindhoven (loan)	2012–13	Eerste Divise	8	0	—		—		8	0
Wellington Phoenix (loan)	2012–13	A-League Men	7	1	—		—		7	1
Sydney FC	2013–14	A-League Men	15	2	—		—		15	2
Sydney FC	2014–15	A-League Men	5	2	2	1	—		7	3
Sydney FC	Total		20	4	2	1	0	0	22	5
Melbourne City	2015–16	A-League Men	5	0	—		—		5	0
Melbourne City	2016–17	A-League Men	0	0	—		—		0	0
Melbourne City	Total		5	0	0	0	0	0	5	0
Brisbane Roar	2017–18	A-League Men	18	0	—		—		18	0
APIA Leichhardt	2021	NSW NPL	2	0	—		—		2	0
Career total			66	4	2	1	1	0	69	5

== Personal life ==
Born in Australia, Gameiro is of Portuguese descent. Gameiro and his partner, right-wing political commentator Lucy Zelić, seven years his senior, announced they expecting their first child, a girl was born 23 April 2019 and named Mila Gameiro.

== Honours ==
Distinctions

- First FFA Cup goal Scorer: (Sydney FC v Melbourne City FC – 12 August 2014)
