= Miloš Dimitrijević =

Serbian footballer (born 1984)

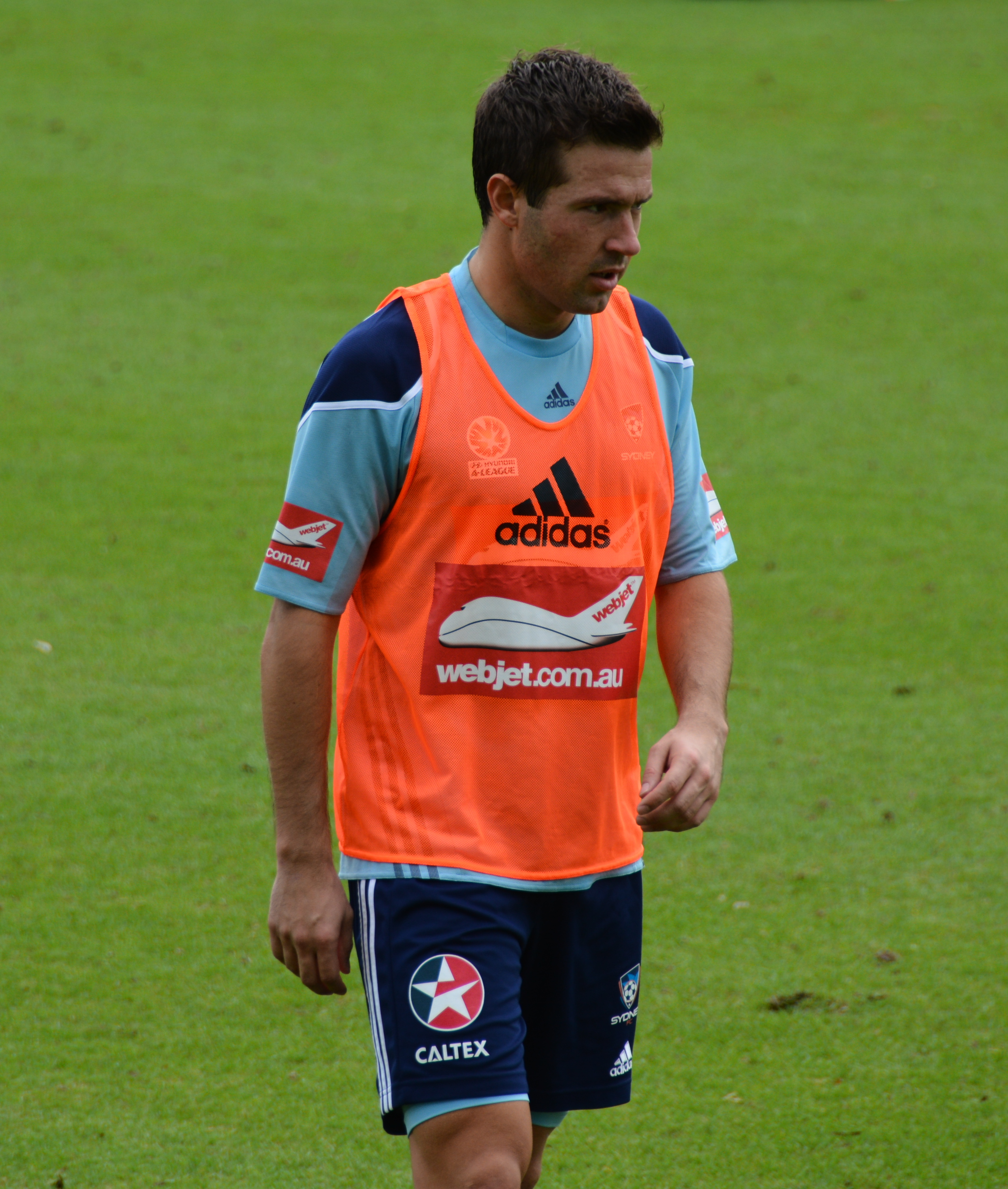
- Dimitrijević training with Sydney FC in 2014

Personal information
- Date of birth: 16 February 1984 (age 42)
- Place of birth: Belgrade, Serbia, SFR Yugoslavia
- Height: 1.80 m (5 ft 11 in)
- Position: Midfielder

Youth career
- 1998–2004: Nantes

Senior career*
Years	Team	Apps	(Gls)
2004–2007	Nantes	51	(1)
2007–2010	Grenoble	38	(0)
2010–2011	Rad	24	(7)
2011	→ Chievo (loan)	2	(0)
2011–2013	Red Star Belgrade	37	(2)
2014–2017	Sydney FC	76	(2)
Total		218	(12)

International career^{‡}
2003–2004	France U18	1	(0)
2005–2006	Serbia U21	1	(0)
- * Club domestic league appearances and goals as of 30 June 2017 ‡ National team caps and goals as of 3 March 2016

Miloš Dimitrijević (Serbian Cyrillic: Милош Димитријевић; born 16 February 1984) is a Serbian retired footballer who last played as a central midfielder for Sydney FC of the Australian A-League.

== Early life ==
Born in Belgrade, he arrived in France at the age of 7, with his father, who was the famous football player, the legend of Partizan and Dinamo Zagreb, Zoran "Čava" Dimitrijević. He joined youth system of Nantes in 1998. He acquired French nationality on 28 April 2000 through the naturalization of his mother.

== Club career ==
He became a professional in 2004. After Nantes, he played for Grenoble, before he returned to his homeland. In Serbia, he played for Rad, where he established himself as one of the best central midfielders in the league. He was brought on loan from Italian Chievo in winter transfer window 2011, but he only managed to play two games. After this unsuccessful international episode, he came back to Serbia to become a new Red Star Belgrade player. He was given number 7 shirt and he signed a contract on 10 June 2011. In April 2013, he became a free agent after managing to cut short his long-term contract due to the club's financial problems.

=== Sydney FC ===
On 16 January 2014 it was confirmed that Dimitrijević had signed for Sydney FC of the A-League in Australia. He scored his first goal for the club on 24 October 2014 in the Rd 3 clash against Brisbane Roar which ended 2–0 with Miloš scoring the second.

In this year Dimitrijević won all three of the players player of the year, members player of the year and coaches player of the year becoming the first ever person to win all three.

Miloš was released by Sydney FC on 3 June 2015.

It was announced on 28 July 2015 that Miloš Dimitrejivić had re-signed with Sydney FC for a further two seasons.

On 2 March 2016, Dimitrijević scored an 89th-minute winner against Guangzhou Evergrande in the Asian Champions League.

On 19 October 2016, Dimitrijević scored a free kick in Sydney FC's 3–0 away win against Canberra Olympic at Viking Park in the FFA Cup

On 30 June 2017, Dimitrijević was released by Sydney FC to allow him to move closer to his family.

== International career ==
While he was playing in France, he was part of France U18 team. Then he decided to play for Serbia instead of France, so he was once capped for Serbia U21, and even was invited to play for senior team of Serbia in November 2010, but the injury forced him to miss the match against Bulgaria.

== Career statistics ==
Appearances and goals by club, season and competition
Club	Season	League			Cup		League Cup		Continental		Total	
Club	Season	Divisioin	Apps	Goals	Apps	Goals	Apps	Goals	Apps	Goals	Apps	Goals
Nantes	2004–05	Ligue 1	11	0	2	0	2	0	0	0	15	0
Nantes	2005–06	Ligue 1	24	1	1	0	1	0	—		26	1
Nantes	2006–07	Ligue 1	16	0	3	0	0	0	—		19	0
Nantes	Total		51	1	6	0	3	0	0	0	60	1
Grenoble	2007–08	Ligue 2	19	0	1	0	1	0	—		21	0
Grenoble	2008–09	Ligue 1	19	0	4	0	1	1	—		24	1
Grenoble	Total		38	0	5	0	2	1	—		45	1
Rad	2009–10	Serbian SuperLiga	10	2	—		—		—		10	2
Rad	2010–11	Serbian SuperLiga	14	5	1	0	—		—		15	5
Rad	Total		24	7	1	0	—		—		25	7
Chievo (loan)	2010–11	Serie A	2	0	0	0	—		—		2	0
Red Star Belgrade	2011–12	Serbian SuperLiga	25	1	5	0	—		4	0	34	1
Red Star Belgrade	2012–13	Serbian SuperLiga	12	1	3	1	—		6	1	21	3
Red Star Belgrade	Total		37	2	8	1	—		10	1	55	4
Sydney FC	2013–14	A-League	9	0	—		—		—		9	0
Sydney FC	2014–15	A-League	28	2	1	0	—		—		29	2
Sydney FC	2015–16	A-League	25	0	0	0	—		8	1	33	1
Sydney FC	2016–17	A-League	14	0	1	0	—		—		15	0
Sydney FC	Total		76	2	2	0	—		8	1	86	3
Career total			228	12	22	1	5	1	18	2	273	16

== Honours ==
=== Club ===
Red Star

- Serbian Cup (1): 2011–12

Sydney FC

- A-League Premiership: 2016–2017
- A-League Championship: 2016–2017

=== Individual ===
Sydney FC

- Club player of the year: 2014–15
- Player's player of the Year: 2014–15
- Members player of the year: 2014–15
- A-League PFA Team of the Season: 2014–15

== Trivia ==
As a resemblance to his father, he is often called Mali Čava.
