= Mensur Kurtiši =

Albanian footballer

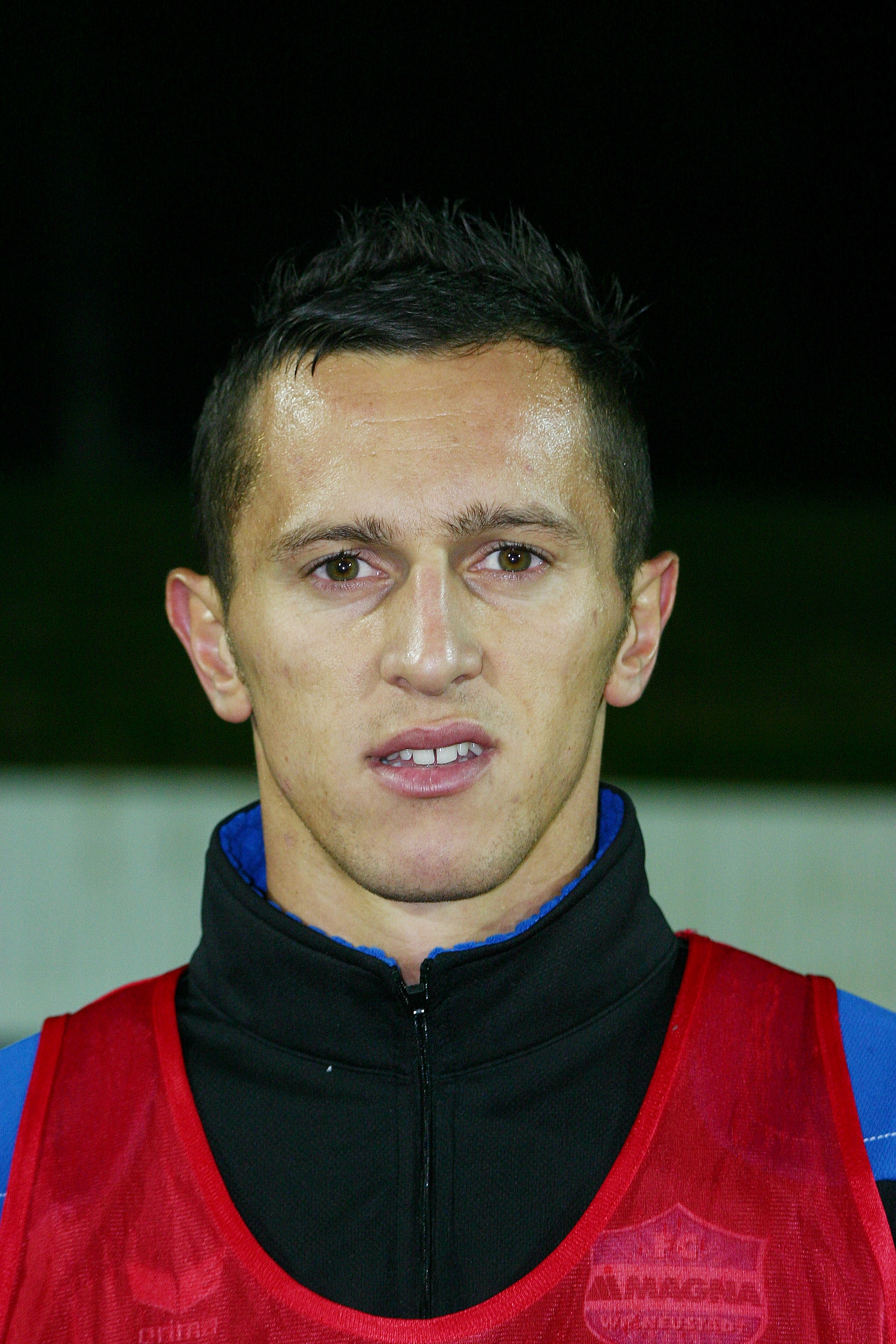
- Kurtiši warming up for Wiener Neustadt in 2008

Personal information
- Full name: Mensur Kurtiši; Менсур Куртиши
- Date of birth: 25 March 1986 (age 40)
- Place of birth: Kumanovo, SFR Yugoslavia
- Height: 6 ft 1 in (1.85 m)
- Position: Forward

Team information
- Current team: First Vienna
- Number: 7

Youth career
- Rapid Wien

Senior career*
Years	Team	Apps	(Gls)
2006–2008	Parndorf 1919	47	(26)
2008–2010	Wiener Neustadt	43	(22)
2010–2011	Al-Taawon	15	(8)
2011–2012	Shkëndija	14	(5)
2012–2013	Tobol	37	(12)
2013–2014	Shkëndija	13	(9)
2014–2015	Brisbane Roar	9	(1)
2015	Varese	7	(0)
2015–2016	Matera	15	(4)
2016–	First Vienna	56	(31)

International career^{‡}
2010	North Macedonia	2	(0)
- * Club domestic league appearances and goals as of 7 July 2016 ‡ National team caps and goals as of 2 June 2010

Mensur Kurtiši (Macedonian: Менсур Куртиши, Albanian: Mensur Kurtishi; born 25 March 1986) is a Macedonian footballer who currently plays for First Vienna in the Austrian Regional League East. Kurtiši plays as a striker and was called up to the Macedonian national team in May 2010.

== Club career ==
Kurtiši was born in the village of Hotlane near Kumanovo, but moved to Austria when he was 13. He began his career with an Austrian club Rapid Wien. Between 2006 and 2008 he played in Parndorf 1919. In September 2008 he signed with the Austrian club SC Wiener Neustadt. In January he joined Al-Shabaab from Al-Tawon. He scored a hat-trick in his first game for Al-Shabab. Persepolis club from Iran signed him on the mid-season transfer window of the Iranian league.

On 15 July 2014, Kurtiši signed a 1-year contract with Brisbane Roar for the 2014–15 A-League season. On 15 January 2015, he was released by the Roar. At the end of winter market, as a free agent he signed a six-month contract for the Italian Serie B legends of A.S. Varese. In January 2016, Kurtiši moved back to Austria to play for First Vienna.

== International career ==
He made his senior debut for Macedonia in a May 2010 friendly match against Azerbaijan and has earned a total of 2 caps, scoring no goals. His second and final international was another friendly 4 days later against Romania.

== Honours ==
Individual

- Best Player in Austrian Football First League: 2007–08
