= 2016 AFC Champions League =

35th edition of premier club football tournament organized by the AFC

Tournament details
- Dates: 27 January – 26 November 2016
- Teams: 45 (from 17 associations)

Final positions
- Champions: (South Korea) Jeonbuk Hyundai Motors (2nd title)
- Runners-up: (United Arab Emirates) Al-Ain

Tournament statistics
- Matches played: 126
- Goals scored: 312 (2.48 per match)
- Attendance: 1,639,885 (13,015 per match)
- Top scorer: Adriano (13 goals)
- Best player: Omar Abdulrahman
- Fair play award: (United Arab Emirates) Al-Ain

The 2016 AFC Champions League was the 35th edition of Asia's premier club football tournament organized by the Asian Football Confederation (AFC), and the 14th under the current AFC Champions League title.

Jeonbuk Hyundai Motors defeated Al-Ain in the final to win their second AFC Champions League title, and qualified as the AFC representative at the 2016 FIFA Club World Cup in Japan, their second appearance in the FIFA Club World Cup. Guangzhou Evergrande were the defending champions, but were eliminated in the group stage.

== Association team allocation ==
The AFC Competitions Committee proposed a revamp of the AFC club competitions on 25 January 2014, which was ratified by the AFC Executive Committee on 16 April 2014. The 46 AFC member associations (excluding the associate member Northern Mariana Islands) are ranked based on their national team's and clubs' performance over the last four years in AFC competitions, with the allocation of slots for the 2015 and 2016 editions of the AFC club competitions determined by the 2014 rankings:

- The associations are split into West Zone and East Zone, with 23 associations in each zone:
  - West Zone consists of the associations from West Asia, Central Asia, South Asia, except India and Maldives
  - East Zone consists of the associations from ASEAN and East Asia, plus India and Maldives
- In each zone, there are a total of 12 direct slots in the group stage, with the 4 remaining slots filled through play-offs.
- The top 12 associations in each zone as per the AFC rankings are eligible to enter the AFC Champions League, as long as they fulfill the AFC Champions League criteria.
- The top six associations in each zone get at least one direct slot in the group stage, while the remaining associations get only play-off slots:
  - The associations ranked 1st and 2nd each get three direct slots and one play-off slot (in play-off round).
  - The associations ranked 3rd and 4th each get two direct slots and two play-off slots (one in play-off round, one in preliminary round 2).
  - The associations ranked 5th each get one direct slot and two play-off slots (both in preliminary round 2).
  - The associations ranked 6th each get one direct slot and one play-off slot (in preliminary round 2).
  - The associations ranked 7th to 12th each get one play-off slot (in preliminary round 1).
- The maximum number of slots for each association is one-third of the total number of clubs in the top division (e.g., Australia can only get a maximum of three total slots as there are only nine Australia-based clubs in the A-League).

The AFC Competitions Committee finalised the slot allocation for the 2015 and 2016 editions of the AFC Champions League based on the criteria, including the AFC rankings and the implementation of club licensing regulations, on 28 November 2014.

The following table shows the slot allocation for the 2016 AFC Champions League, which are adjusted accordingly since some of the slots are unused.

Participation for 2016 AFC Champions League
Fulfills participation criteria
Does not fulfill participation criteria

West Zone
Rank		Member Association	Points	Slots			
Rank		Member Association	Points	Group stage	Play-off		
Zone	All	Member Association	Points	Group stage	Play-off round	Prelim. round 2	Prelim. round 1
1	2	(Saudi Arabia) Saudi Arabia	88.268	3	1	0	0
2	3	Iran	80.794	3	1	0	0
3	5	Uzbekistan	62.272	3	1	0	0
4	7	(United Arab Emirates) United Arab Emirates	57.792	2	2	0	0
5	9	Qatar	56.103	1	2	0	0
6	10	Iraq	47.106	0	0	0	0
7	11	Kuwait	45.423	0	0	0	0
8	12	Jordan	44.309	0	1	0	0
9	14	Oman	30.586	0	0	0	0
10	16	Bahrain	25.547	0	0	0	0
11	17	Lebanon	25.043	0	0	0	0
12	19	Syria	22.883	0	0	0	0
Total				12	8	0	0
Total				12	8		
Total				20			

East Zone
Rank		Member Association	Points	Slots			
Rank		Member Association	Points	Group stage	Play-off		
Zone	All	Member Association	Points	Group stage	Play-off round	Prelim. round 2	Prelim. round 1
1	1	(South Korea) South Korea	94.866	3	1	0	0
2	4	Japan	77.107	3	1	0	0
3	6	Australia	57.940	2	1	0	0
4	8	China	57.660	2	1	1	0
5	13	Thailand	33.049	1	0	2	0
6	15	Vietnam	27.753	1	0	1	0
7	18	Indonesia	25.004	0	0	0	0
8	20	(Hong Kong) Hong Kong	20.077	0	0	1	0
9	21	Myanmar	18.949	0	0	1	0
10	22	Malaysia	18.153	0	0	1	0
11	23	India	16.756	0	0	0	1
12	24	Singapore	16.097	0	0	0	1
Total				12	4	7	2
Total				12	13		
Total				25			

Notes

1. United Arab Emirates had their fourth team entering the play-off round instead of the preliminary round 2 due to unused slots.
2. Qatar had their third and fourth teams entering the play-off round instead of the preliminary round 2 due to unused slots.
3. Iraq were allocated two preliminary round 2 slots, but were not allowed to participate as none of their teams passed the club licensing requirements.
4. Kuwait were allocated one preliminary round 1 slot, but could not participate due to FIFA's suspension of its football association.
5. Jordan had their team entering the play-off round instead of the preliminary round 1 due to unused slots.
6. Oman, Bahrain, Lebanon and Syria were allocated one preliminary round 1 slot, but were not allowed to participate as none of their teams passed the club licensing requirements.
7. Indonesia were allocated one preliminary round 2 slot, could not participate in the AFC Champions League due to FIFA's suspension of its football association.
8. Myanmar and Malaysia had their team entering the preliminary round 2 instead of the preliminary round 1 due to unused slots.

== Teams ==
The following 45 teams from 17 associations entered the competition.

In the following table, the number of appearances and last appearance count only those since the 2002–03 season (including qualifying rounds), when the competition was rebranded as the AFC Champions League. TH means title holders.

West Zone
Team	Qualifying method	App	Last App
Group stage direct entrants (Groups A–D)
(Saudi Arabia) Al-Nassr	2014–15 Saudi Professional League champions	3rd	2015
(Saudi Arabia) Al-Hilal	2015 King Cup winners 2014–15 Saudi Professional League 3rd place	12th	2015
(Saudi Arabia) Al-Ahli	2014–15 Saudi Professional League runners-up	8th	2015
(Iran) Sepahan	2014–15 Persian Gulf Pro League champions	11th	2014
(Iran) Zob Ahan	2014–15 Hazfi Cup winners	5th	2012
(Iran) Tractor	2014–15 Persian Gulf Pro League runners-up	4th	2015
(Uzbekistan) Pakhtakor	2015 Uzbek League champions	13th	2015
(Uzbekistan) Nasaf Qarshi	2015 Uzbekistan Cup winners 2015 Uzbek League 3rd place	4th	2015
(Uzbekistan) Lokomotiv Tashkent	2015 Uzbek League runners-up	4th	2015
(United Arab Emirates) Al-Ain	2014–15 UAE Pro-League champions	11th	2015
(United Arab Emirates) Al-Nasr	2014–15 UAE President's Cup winners	3rd	2013
(Qatar) Lekhwiya	2014–15 Qatar Stars League champions	5th	2015
Qualifying play-off participants
Entering in play-off round
(Saudi Arabia) Al-Ittihad	2014–15 Saudi Professional League 4th place	10th	2014
(Iran) Naft Tehran	2014–15 Persian Gulf Pro League 3rd place	2nd	2015
(Uzbekistan) Bunyodkor	2015 Uzbek League 4th place	9th	2015
(United Arab Emirates) Al-Jazira	2014–15 UAE Pro-League runners-up	8th	2015
(United Arab Emirates) Al-Shabab	2014–15 UAE Pro-League 3rd place	4th	2013
(Qatar) Al-Sadd	2015 Emir of Qatar Cup winners 2014–15 Qatar Stars League runners-up	11th	2015
(Qatar) El Jaish	2014–15 Qatar Stars League 3rd place	4th	2015
(Jordan) Al-Wehdat	2014–15 Jordan League champions	3rd	2015

East Zone
Team	Qualifying method	App	Last App
Group stage direct entrants (Groups E–H)
(South Korea) Jeonbuk Hyundai Motors	2015 K League Classic champions	10th	2015
(South Korea) FC Seoul	2015 Korean FA Cup winners	6th	2015
(South Korea) Suwon Samsung Bluewings	2015 K League Classic runners-up	7th	2015
(Japan) Sanfrecce Hiroshima	2015 J1 League champions	4th	2014
(Japan) Gamba Osaka	2015 Emperor's Cup winners 2015 J1 League runners-up	8th	2015
(Japan) Urawa Red Diamonds	2015 J1 League 3rd place	5th	2015
(Australia) Melbourne Victory	2014–15 A-League premiers and 2015 A-League Grand Final winners	5th	2014
(Australia) Sydney FC	2014–15 A-League regular season runners-up	3rd	2011
(China) Guangzhou Evergrande^{TH}	2015 Chinese Super League champions	5th	2015
(China) Jiangsu Suning	2015 Chinese FA Cup winners	2nd	2013
(Thailand) Buriram United	2015 Thai Premier League champions and 2015 Thai FA Cup winners	6th	2015
(Vietnam) Becamex Bình Dương	2015 V.League 1 champions and 2015 Vietnamese Cup winners	3rd	2015
Qualifying play-off participants
Entering in play-off round
(South Korea) Pohang Steelers	2015 K League Classic 3rd place	7th	2014
(Japan) FC Tokyo	2015 J1 League 4th place	2nd	2012
(Australia) Adelaide United	2014–15 A-League regular season 3rd place	5th	2012
(China) Shanghai SIPG	2015 Chinese Super League runners-up	1st	none
Entering in preliminary round 2
(China) Shandong Luneng	2015 Chinese Super League 3rd place	8th	2015
(Thailand) Muangthong United	2015 Thai Premier League runners-up	5th	2014
(Thailand) Chonburi	2015 Thai Premier League 4th place	5th	2015
(Vietnam) Hà Nội T&T	2015 V.League 1 runners-up	3rd	2015
(Hong Kong) Kitchee	2014–15 Hong Kong Premier League champions	2nd	2015
(Myanmar) Yangon United	2015 Myanmar National League champions	1st	none
(Malaysia) Johor Darul Ta'zim	2015 Malaysia Super League champions	2nd	2015
Entering in preliminary round 1
(India) Mohun Bagan	2014–15 I-League champions	2nd	2002–03
(Singapore) Tampines Rovers	2015 S.League runners-up	2nd	2014

Notes

1. China (CHN): Jiangsu Suning had its name changed from "Jiangsu Sainty" in December 2015. They are referred to as "Jiangsu FC" by the AFC in its official reports for the 2016 AFC Champions League.
2. Singapore (SIN): Since Brunei DPMM, the 2015 S.League champions, is a team managed by the National Football Association of Brunei Darussalam and thus ineligible to represent Singapore in AFC club competitions, their place was taken by Tampines Rovers, the league runners-up.
3. Thailand (THA): Since Suphanburi, the 2015 Thai Premier League 3rd place, failed to pass the club licensing requirements, their place was taken by Chonburi, the league 4th place.
Location of teams of the 2016 AFC Champions League.
West Zone
East Zone
(p) Qualifying play-off participants

== Schedule ==
The schedule of the competition was as follows (all draws were held in Kuala Lumpur, Malaysia).

Stage	Round	Draw date	First leg	Second leg
Preliminary stage	Preliminary round 1	No draw	27 January 2016	
Preliminary stage	Preliminary round 2	No draw	2 February 2016	
Play-off stage	Play-off round	No draw	9 February 2016	
Group stage	Matchday 1	10 December 2015	23–24 February 2016	
Group stage	Matchday 2	10 December 2015	1–2 March 2016	
Group stage	Matchday 3	10 December 2015	15–16 March 2016	
Group stage	Matchday 4	10 December 2015	5–6 April 2016	
Group stage	Matchday 5	10 December 2015	19–20 April 2016	
Group stage	Matchday 6	10 December 2015	3–4 May 2016	
Knockout stage	Round of 16	10 December 2015	17–18 May 2016	24–25 May 2016
Knockout stage	Quarter-finals	9 June 2016	23–24 August 2016	13–14 September 2016
Knockout stage	Semi-finals	9 June 2016	27–28 September 2016	18–19 October 2016
Knockout stage	Final	9 June 2016	19 November 2016	26 November 2016

== Qualifying play-off ==
In the qualifying play-off, each tie was played as a single match. Extra time and penalty shoot-out were used to decide the winner if necessary (Regulations Article 10.2). The eight winners of the play-off round advanced to the group stage to join the 24 direct entrants. All losers in each round which were from associations with only play-off slots entered the AFC Cup group stage. The bracket of the qualifying play-off was determined by the AFC based on the association ranking of each team, with the team from the higher-ranked association hosting each match. Teams from the same association could not be placed in the same play-off.

=== Preliminary round 1 ===
East Zone
Team 1	Score	Team 2
Mohun Bagan (India)	3–1	(Singapore) Tampines Rovers

=== Preliminary round 2 ===
East Zone
Team 1	Score	Team 2
Hà Nội T&T (Vietnam)	1–0	(Hong Kong) Kitchee
Chonburi (Thailand)	3–2 (a.e.t.)	(Myanmar) Yangon United
Shandong Luneng (China)	6–0	(India) Mohun Bagan
Muangthong United (Thailand)	0–0 (a.e.t.) (3–0 p)	(Malaysia) Johor Darul Ta'zim

=== Play-off round ===
West Zone
Team 1	Score	Team 2
Al-Ittihad (Saudi Arabia)	2–1	(Jordan) Al-Wehdat
Naft Tehran (Iran)	0–2	(Qatar) El Jaish
Bunyodkor (Uzbekistan)	2–0	(United Arab Emirates) Al-Shabab
Al-Jazira (United Arab Emirates)	2–2 (a.e.t.) (5–4 p)	(Qatar) Al-Sadd

East Zone
Team 1	Score	Team 2
Pohang Steelers (South Korea)	3–0	(Vietnam) Hà Nội T&T
FC Tokyo (Japan)	9–0	(Thailand) Chonburi
Adelaide United (Australia)	1–2	(China) Shandong Luneng
Shanghai SIPG (China)	3–0	(Thailand) Muangthong United

== Group stage ==
The draw for the group stage was held on 10 December 2015, 16:00 MYT (UTC+8), at the Petaling Jaya Hilton Hotel in Kuala Lumpur, Malaysia. The 32 teams were drawn into eight groups of four. Teams from the same association could not be drawn into the same group. In the group stage, each group was played on a home-and-away round-robin basis. The winners and runners-up of each group advanced to the round of 16.

Tiebreakers
The teams were ranked according to points (3 points for a win, 1 point for a draw, 0 points for a loss). If tied on points, tiebreakers would be applied in the following order (Regulations Article 11.5):
1. Greater number of points obtained in the group matches between the teams concerned;
2. Goal difference resulting from the group matches between the teams concerned;
3. Greater number of goals scored in the group matches between the teams concerned;
4. Greater number of away goals scored in the group matches between the teams concerned;
5. If, after applying criteria 1 to 4, teams still have an equal ranking, criteria 1 to 4 are reapplied exclusively to the matches between the teams in question to determine their final rankings. If this procedure does not lead to a decision, criteria 6 to 10 apply;
6. Goal difference in all the group matches;
7. Greater number of goals scored in all the group matches;
8. Penalty shoot-out if only two teams are involved and they are both on the field of play;
9. Fewer score calculated according to the number of yellow and red cards received in the group matches (1 point for a single yellow card, 3 points for a red card as a consequence of two yellow cards, 3 points for a direct red card, 4 points for a yellow card followed by a direct red card);
10. Team who belongs to the member association with the higher AFC ranking.

=== Group A ===
Pos	Team	Pld	W	D	L	GF	GA	GD	Pts	Qualification	LOK	NAS	ITT	SEP
1	(Uzbekistan) Lokomotiv Tashkent	6	2	4	0	6	3	+3	10	Advance to knockout stage	—	0–0	1–1	1–0
2	(United Arab Emirates) Al-Nasr	6	2	3	1	5	4	+1	9	Advance to knockout stage	1–1	—	0–0	2–0
3	(Saudi Arabia) Al-Ittihad	6	2	3	1	9	4	+5	9		1–1	1–2	—	4–0
4	(Iran) Sepahan	6	1	0	5	2	11	−9	3		0–2	2–0	0–2	—

Source: AFC

=== Group B ===
Pos	Team	Pld	W	D	L	GF	GA	GD	Pts	Qualification	ZOB	LEK	NSR	BYD
1	(Iran) Zob Ahan	6	4	2	0	12	2	+10	14	Advance to knockout stage	—	0–0	3–0	5–2
2	(Qatar) Lekhwiya	6	2	3	1	7	2	+5	9	Advance to knockout stage	0–1	—	4–0	0–0
3	(Saudi Arabia) Al-Nassr	6	1	2	3	5	14	−9	5		0–3	1–1	—	3–3
4	(Uzbekistan) Bunyodkor	6	0	3	3	5	11	−6	3		0–0	0–2	0–1	—

Source: AFC

=== Group C ===
Pos	Team	Pld	W	D	L	GF	GA	GD	Pts	Qualification	TRA	HIL	PAK	JAZ
1	(Iran) Tractor Sazi	6	4	0	2	10	3	+7	12	Advance to knockout stage	—	1–2	2–0	4–0
2	(Saudi Arabia) Al-Hilal	6	3	2	1	10	7	+3	11	Advance to knockout stage	0–2	—	4–1	1–0
3	(Uzbekistan) Pakhtakor	6	3	1	2	10	9	+1	10		1–0	2–2	—	3–0
4	(United Arab Emirates) Al-Jazira	6	0	1	5	2	13	−11	1		0–1	1–1	1–3	—

Source: AFC

=== Group D ===
Pos	Team	Pld	W	D	L	GF	GA	GD	Pts	Qualification	JSH	AIN	AHL	NSF
1	(Qatar) El Jaish	6	3	1	2	6	8	−2	10	Advance to knockout stage	—	2–1	1–4	1–0
2	(United Arab Emirates) Al-Ain	6	3	1	2	8	6	+2	10	Advance to knockout stage	1–2	—	1–0	2–0
3	(Saudi Arabia) Al-Ahli	6	3	0	3	10	7	+3	9		2–0	1–2	—	2–1
4	(Uzbekistan) Nasaf Qarshi	6	1	2	3	4	7	−3	5		0–0	1–1	2–1	—

Source: AFC

=== Group E ===
Pos	Team	Pld	W	D	L	GF	GA	GD	Pts	Qualification	JHM	TOK	JIA	BBD
1	(South Korea) Jeonbuk Hyundai Motors	6	3	1	2	13	9	+4	10	Advance to knockout stage	—	2–1	2–2	2–0
2	(Japan) FC Tokyo	6	3	1	2	8	8	0	10	Advance to knockout stage	0–3	—	0–0	3–1
3	(China) Jiangsu Suning	6	2	3	1	10	7	+3	9		3–2	1–2	—	3–0
4	(Vietnam) Becamex Binh Duong	6	1	1	4	6	13	−7	4		3–2	1–2	1–1	—

Source: AFC

=== Group F ===
Pos	Team	Pld	W	D	L	GF	GA	GD	Pts	Qualification	SEO	SHD	HIR	BUR
1	(South Korea) FC Seoul	6	4	1	1	17	5	+12	13	Advance to knockout stage	—	0–0	4–1	2–1
2	(China) Shandong Luneng	6	3	2	1	7	5	+2	11	Advance to knockout stage	1–4	—	1–0	3–0
3	(Japan) Sanfrecce Hiroshima	6	3	0	3	9	8	+1	9		2–1	1–2	—	3–0
4	(Thailand) Buriram United	6	0	1	5	1	16	−15	1		0–6	0–0	0–2	—

Source: AFC

=== Group G ===
Pos	Team	Pld	W	D	L	GF	GA	GD	Pts	Qualification	SSI	MEL	SSB	GAM
1	(China) Shanghai SIPG	6	4	0	2	10	8	+2	12	Advance to knockout stage	—	3–1	2–1	2–1
2	(Australia) Melbourne Victory	6	2	3	1	7	7	0	9 (Note: Head-to-head points: Melbourne Victory 2, Suwon Samsung Bluewings 2. Head-to-head away goal: Melbourne Victory 1, Suwon Samsung Bluewings 0)	Advance to knockout stage	2–1	—	0–0	2–1
3	(South Korea) Suwon Samsung Bluewings	6	2	3	1	7	4	+3	9		3–0	1–1	—	0–0
4	(Japan) Gamba Osaka	6	0	2	4	4	9	−5	2		0–2	1–1	1–2	—

Source: AFC

=== Group H ===
Pos	Team	Pld	W	D	L	GF	GA	GD	Pts	Qualification	SYD	URA	GZE	POH
1	(Australia) Sydney FC	6	3	1	2	4	4	0	10	Advance to knockout stage	—	0–0	2–1	1–0
2	(Japan) Urawa Red Diamonds	6	2	3	1	6	4	+2	9	Advance to knockout stage	2–0	—	1–0	1–1
3	(China) Guangzhou Evergrande	6	2	2	2	6	5	+1	8		1–0	2–2	—	0–0
4	(South Korea) Pohang Steelers	6	1	2	3	2	5	−3	5		0–1	1–0	0–2	—

Source: AFC

== Knockout stage ==
In the knockout stage, the 16 teams played a single-elimination tournament, with the teams split between the two zones until the final. Each tie was played on a home-and-away two-legged basis. The away goals rule, extra time (away goals do not apply in extra time) and penalty shoot-out were used to decide the winner if necessary (Regulations Article 12.3).

=== Bracket ===
Round of 16
(Japan) FC Tokyo	2	0	2
(China) Shanghai SIPG (a)	1	1	2
(Australia) Melbourne Victory	1	1	2
(South Korea) Jeonbuk Hyundai Motors	1	2	3
(Japan) Urawa Red Diamonds	1	2	3 (6)
(South Korea) FC Seoul (p)	0	3	3 (7)
(China) Shandong Luneng (a)	1	2	3
(Australia) Sydney FC	1	2	3
(United Arab Emirates) Al-Ain	1	2	3
(Iran) Zob Ahan	1	0	1
(Saudi Arabia) Al-Hilal	0	1	1
(Uzbekistan) Lokomotiv Tashkent	0	2	2
(Qatar) Lekhwiya	0	4	4
(Qatar) El Jaish	4	2	6
(United Arab Emirates) Al-Nasr	4	1	5
(Iran) Tractor Sazi	1	3	4

Quarter-finals
(China) Shanghai SIPG	0	0	0
(South Korea) Jeonbuk Hyundai Motors	0	5	5
(South Korea) FC Seoul	3	1	4
(China) Shandong Luneng	1	1	2
(United Arab Emirates) Al-Ain	0	1	1
(Uzbekistan) Lokomotiv Tashkent	0	0	0
(Qatar) El Jaish (1st leg awd.)	3	1	4
(United Arab Emirates) Al-Nasr	0	0	0

Semi-finals
(South Korea) Jeonbuk Hyundai Motors	4	1	5
(South Korea) FC Seoul	1	2	3
(United Arab Emirates) Al-Ain	3	2	5
(Qatar) El Jaish	1	2	3

Final
(South Korea) Jeonbuk Hyundai Motors	2	1	3
(United Arab Emirates) Al-Ain	1	1	2

=== Round of 16 ===
In the round of 16, the winners of one group played the runners-up of another group from the same zone, with the group winners hosting the second leg.

West Zone
Team 1	Agg.	Team 2	1st leg	2nd leg
Al-Hilal (Saudi Arabia)	1–2	(Uzbekistan) Lokomotiv Tashkent	0–0	1–2
Al-Nasr (United Arab Emirates)	5–4	(Iran) Tractor Sazi	4–1	1–3
Al-Ain (United Arab Emirates)	3–1	(Iran) Zob Ahan	1–1	2–0
Lekhwiya (Qatar)	4–6	(Qatar) El Jaish	0–4	4–2

East Zone
Team 1	Agg.	Team 2	1st leg	2nd leg
Melbourne Victory (Australia)	2–3	(South Korea) Jeonbuk Hyundai Motors	1–1	1–2
FC Tokyo (Japan)	2–2 (a)	(China) Shanghai SIPG	2–1	0–1
Urawa Red Diamonds (Japan)	3–3 (6–7 p)	(South Korea) FC Seoul	1–0	2–3 (a.e.t.)
Shandong Luneng (China)	3–3 (a)	(Australia) Sydney FC	1–1	2–2

=== Quarter-finals ===
In the quarter-finals, the four teams from the West Zone were drawn into two ties, and the four teams from the East Zone were drawn into the other two ties, with the order of legs also decided by the draw.

The draw for the quarter-finals was held on 9 June 2016, 16:00 MYT (UTC+8), at the Petaling Jaya Hilton Hotel in Kuala Lumpur, Malaysia. There was no seeding or country protection, so teams from the same association could be drawn into the same tie.

West Region
Team 1	Agg.	Team 2	1st leg	2nd leg
Al-Ain (United Arab Emirates)	1–0	(Uzbekistan) Lokomotiv Tashkent	0–0	1–0
El Jaish (Qatar)	4–0	(United Arab Emirates) Al-Nasr	3–0 (awd.)	1–0

East Region
Team 1	Agg.	Team 2	1st leg	2nd leg
Shanghai SIPG (China)	0–5	(South Korea) Jeonbuk Hyundai Motors	0–0	0–5
FC Seoul (South Korea)	4–2	(China) Shandong Luneng	3–1	1–1

Notes

9. The El Jaish v Al-Nasr first leg, originally won 3–0 by Al-Nasr, was forfeited and awarded 3–0 to El Jaish by the AFC Disciplinary Committee on 12 September 2016, as Al-Nasr fielded the player Wanderley who was found to be registered using a fake Indonesian passport.

=== Semi-finals ===
In the semi-finals, the two quarter-final winners from the West Zone play each other, and the two quarter-final winners from the East Zone play each other, with the order of legs determined by the quarter-final draw.

West Region
Team 1	Agg.	Team 2	1st leg	2nd leg
Al-Ain (United Arab Emirates)	5–3	(Qatar) El Jaish	3–1	2–2

East Region
Team 1	Agg.	Team 2	1st leg	2nd leg
Jeonbuk Hyundai Motors (South Korea)	5–3	(South Korea) FC Seoul	4–1	1–2

=== Final ===
In the final, the two semi-final winners play each other, with the order of legs reversed from the previous season's final, with the team from the East Zone hosting the first leg, and the team from the West Zone hosting the second leg.

19 November 2016
19:00 UTC+9

Jeonbuk Hyundai Motors (South Korea)	2–1	(United Arab Emirates) Al-Ain
Leonardo 70', 77' (pen.)	Report	Asprilla 63'

Jeonju World Cup Stadium, Jeonju
Attendance: 36,158
Referee: Ahmed Al-Kaf (Oman)
26 November 2016
18:25 UTC+4

Al-Ain (United Arab Emirates)	1–1	(South Korea) Jeonbuk Hyundai Motors
Lee Myung-joo 34'	Report	Han Kyo-won 30'

Hazza Bin Zayed Stadium, Al Ain
Attendance: 23,239
Referee: Ryuji Sato (Japan)

Jeonbuk Hyundai Motors won 3–2 on aggregate.

== Awards ==
=== Main awards ===
Award	Player	Team
Most Valuable Player	(United Arab Emirates) Omar Abdulrahman	(United Arab Emirates) Al-Ain
Top Goalscorer	(Brazil) Adriano	(South Korea) FC Seoul
Fair Play Award	—	(United Arab Emirates) Al-Ain

=== All-Star Squad ===
Position	Player	Team
Goalkeepers	(South Korea) Kwoun Sun-tae	(South Korea) Jeonbuk Hyundai Motors
Goalkeepers	(Uzbekistan) Ignatiy Nesterov	(Uzbekistan) Lokomotiv Tashkent
Defenders	(United Arab Emirates) Ismail Ahmed	(United Arab Emirates) Al-Ain
Defenders	(Brazil) Gil	(China) Shandong Luneng
Defenders	(South Korea) Kim Ju-young	(China) Shanghai SIPG
Defenders	(South Korea) Cho Sung-hwan	(South Korea) Jeonbuk Hyundai Motors
Defenders	(South Korea) Kwak Tae-hwi	(South Korea) FC Seoul
Midfielders	(United Arab Emirates) Omar Abdulrahman	(United Arab Emirates) Al-Ain
Midfielders	(South Korea) Kim Bo-kyung	(South Korea) Jeonbuk Hyundai Motors
Midfielders	(Uzbekistan) Server Djeparov	(Uzbekistan) Lokomotiv Tashkent
Midfielders	(South Korea) Lee Jae-sung	(South Korea) Jeonbuk Hyundai Motors
Midfielders	(Mali) Seydou Keita	(Qatar) El Jaish
Midfielders	(Brazil) Leonardo	(South Korea) Jeonbuk Hyundai Motors
Midfielders	(Argentina) Walter Montillo	(China) Shandong Luneng
Midfielders	(South Korea) Lee Myung-joo	(United Arab Emirates) Al-Ain
Forwards	(Brazil) Adriano	(South Korea) FC Seoul
Forwards	(Colombia) Danilo Moreno Asprilla	(United Arab Emirates) Al-Ain
Forwards	(Brazil) Caio	(United Arab Emirates) Al-Ain
Forwards	(Montenegro) Dejan Damjanović	(South Korea) FC Seoul
Forwards	(Brazil) Hulk	(China) Shanghai SIPG
Forwards	(China) Wu Lei	(China) Shanghai SIPG
Forwards	(Brazil) Ricardo Lopes	(South Korea) Jeonbuk Hyundai Motors
Forwards	(Brazil) Romarinho	(Qatar) El Jaish

=== Opta Best XI ===
Position	Player	Team
Goalkeeper	(United Arab Emirates) Khalid Eisa	(United Arab Emirates) Al-Ain
Defenders	(United Arab Emirates) Ahmed Al-Yassi	(United Arab Emirates) Al-Nasr
Defenders	(United Arab Emirates) Ismail Ahmed	(United Arab Emirates) Al-Ain
Defenders	(United Arab Emirates) Mahmoud Khamees	(United Arab Emirates) Al-Nasr
Midfielders	(United Arab Emirates) Omar Abdulrahman	(United Arab Emirates) Al-Ain
Midfielders	(Brazil) Leonardo	(South Korea) Jeonbuk Hyundai Motors
Midfielders	(South Korea) Lee Jae-sung	(South Korea) Jeonbuk Hyundai Motors
Midfielders	(China) Wu Lei	(China) Shanghai SIPG
Forwards	(Brazil) Adriano	(South Korea) FC Seoul
Forwards	(Brazil) Douglas	(United Arab Emirates) Al-Ain
Forwards	(Brazil) Romarinho	(Qatar) El Jaish

== Top scorers ==
Rank	Player	Team	MD1	MD2	MD3	MD4	MD5	MD6	2R1	2R2	QF1	QF2	SF1	SF2	F1	F2	Total
1	(Brazil) Adriano	(South Korea) FC Seoul	4	3	2			1		1	1			1			13
2	(Brazil) Leonardo	(South Korea) Jeonbuk Hyundai Motors						1	1	2		2	2		2		10
3	(Brazil) Romarinho	(Qatar) El Jaish	1						2	1		1		2			7
4	(Montenegro) Dejan Damjanović	(South Korea) FC Seoul	1		1		1			1	1						5
4	(Brazil) Douglas	(United Arab Emirates) Al-Ain	1			2			1				1				5
4	(Uzbekistan) Igor Sergeev	(Uzbekistan) Pakhtakor	1	1	1		2										5
4	(South Korea) Lee Dong-gook	(South Korea) Jeonbuk Hyundai Motors	1	1	1							2					5
4	(China) Wu Lei	(China) Shanghai SIPG	1	1		1			1	1							5
9	(Colombia) Danilo Moreno Asprilla	(United Arab Emirates) Al-Ain					1	1		1					1		4
9	(Albania) Besart Berisha	(Australia) Melbourne Victory	1					1	1	1							4
9	(Brazil) Elkeson	(China) Shanghai SIPG		1	2		1										4
9	(Morocco) Abderrazak Hamdallah	(Qatar) El Jaish	1	1			1		1								4
9	(Brazil) Jô	(China) Jiangsu Suning		1		1	1	1									4
9	(Vietnam) Nguyễn Anh Đức	(Vietnam) Becamex Bình Dương	1	1		2											4
9	(Brazil) Diego Tardelli	(China) Shandong Luneng	1	1			1		1								4

Note: Goals scored in the qualifying play-off are not counted when determining top scorer (see regulations, Article 77.4).

Source: the-AFC.com

== Controversies ==
On 25 January 2016, the AFC announced changes to the group stage schedule due to Saudi Arabia's refusal to play in Iran. After the changes, all matches between teams from Iran and Saudi Arabia (including possible play-off winners) were rescheduled to be played on matchdays 5 and 6 (19–20 April and 3–4 May). The venues of these matches would be decided after an evaluation deadline of 15 March 2016. As there had not been a return to normal relations between the two countries by then with Saudi Arabia refusing to lift their travel restrictions to Iran, the AFC accepted the Saudi Arabian Football Federation's proposal of playing all matches between teams from Iran and Saudi Arabia in neutral venues. The Saudi Arabian Football Federation supports its clubs who refuse to travel to Iran. The Iranian Football Federation has stated that it could withdraw from the AFC Champions League due to the venue changes.

== See also ==
- 2016 AFC Cup
- 2016 FIFA Club World Cup
