= Nikola Petković (footballer, born 1986) =

Chinese footballer

Personal information
- Date of birth: 28 March 1986 (age 40)
- Place of birth: Belgrade, SFR Yugoslavia
- Height: 1.85 m (6 ft 1 in)
- Position: Centre back

Team information
- Current team: Rad

Youth career
- Rad

Senior career*
Years	Team	Apps	(Gls)
2005–2006	Radnički Pirot	12	(0)
2006–2007	Vojvodina	28	(1)
2007–2008	Gençlerbirliği	6	(0)
2008	→ Hacettepe (loan)	10	(0)
2008	→ Red Star Belgrade (loan)	13	(0)
2009–2011	Eintracht Frankfurt	11	(0)
2010	→ Tom Tomsk (loan)	7	(0)
2011	→ Al-Ahli (loan)	9	(0)
2011–2013	Red Star Belgrade	23	(0)
2012	→ Hapoel Tel Aviv (loan)	8	(0)
2013–2015	Sydney FC	54	(0)
2015–2016	Westerlo	15	(1)
2016–2017	Yanbian Funde	31	(3)
2018	Zemun	8	(3)
2018	Police Tero	15	(0)
2019	Sichuan Longfor	10	(0)
2019	Vojvodina	3	(0)
2025–	Rad	6	(1)

International career
2007–2009	Serbia U21	13	(2)
2019	China U25 (unofficial)	1	(0)
Medal record
Silver medal – second place	UEFA Under-21 Championship	2007
- * Club domestic league appearances and goals as of 15 November 2025

Nikola Petković (Serbian Cyrillic: Никола Петковић, pronounced [nǐkola pêtkoʋitɕ]; born 28 March 1986) is a Serbian footballer who plays as a centre-back for Rad.

== Club career ==
Petković began his career with FK Vojvodina with which he played in the 2006–07 Serbian SuperLiga season. Foreign clubs became interested in his services and he subsequently signed for Gençlerbirliği S.K., where he got less playing time and was loaned to two different clubs. In the summer of 2009, he signed with Eintracht Frankfurt, but again only managed to play on an infrequent basis and was loaned out to FC Tom Tomsk and Al-Ahli Saudi FC before coming to sign for Red Star Belgrade in 2011.

=== Red Star Belgrade ===
Petković signed a two-year contract with Red Star Belgrade on the last day of the summer 2011 transfer window.

=== Sydney FC ===
On 19 September 2013, Sydney FC announced that they had completed their squad for the 2013/14 season by signing Petković on a one-year deal. After completing the move, Sydney FC manager Frank Farina stated: "I am expecting big things from him this season and believe he will have a big influence on the squad." Petković made his debut for Sydney FC on 11 October 2013 at home to Newcastle Jets where Sydney FC won 2–0.

On 8 October 2014, Petković, along with teammate Saša Ognenovski were appointed Sydney FC's vice-captains for the 2014–15 A-League season.

=== Westerlo ===
On 24 June, Petković signed with K.V.C. Westerlo. Despite being contracted until 2017, Petković terminated his contract in January 2016 for personal reasons.

=== Yanbian Fude ===
On 26 January 2016, Petković transferred to Yanbian Funde in the Chinese Super League. He extended his contract with Yanbian on 10 February 2017.

== Career statistics ==
As of match played 30 October 2019

Club	Season	League			Cup		Continental		Other		Total	
Club	Season	Division	Apps	Goals	Apps	Goals	Apps	Goals	Apps	Goals	Apps	Goals
Vojvodina	2005–06	Serbian SuperLiga	6	1	0	0	0	0	—		6	1
Vojvodina	2006–07	Serbian SuperLiga	22	0	0	0	0	0	—		22	0
Vojvodina	Total		28	1	0	0	—		—		28	1
Gençlerbirliği	2007–08	Süper Lig	6	0	1	0	—		—		7	0
Hacettepe (loan)	2007–08	Süper Lig	10	0	2	0	—		—		12	0
Red Star Belgrade	2008–09	Serbian SuperLiga	13	0	0	0	0	0	—		13	0
Eintracht Frankfurt	2008–09	Bundesliga	6	0	—		—		—		6	0
Eintracht Frankfurt	2009–10	Bundesliga	2	0	0	0	—		—		2	0
Eintracht Frankfurt	2010–11	Bundesliga	1	0	0	0	—		—		1	0
Eintracht Frankfurt	Total		9	0	0	0	—		—		9	0
Tom Tomsk (loan)	2010	Russian Premier League	7	0	—		—		—		7	0
Al-Ahli (loan)	2010–11	Saudi Pro League	9	0	2	0	—		1	0	12	0
Red Star Belgrade	2011–12	Serbian SuperLiga	12	0	2	0	0	0	—		14	0
Red Star Belgrade	2012–13	Serbian SuperLiga	11	0	—		—		—		11	0
Red Star Belgrade	Total		23	0	2	0	—		—		25	0
Hapoel Tel Aviv (loan)	2012–13	Israeli Premier League	8	0	—		3	0	—		11	0
Sydney FC	2013–14	A-League	28	0	—		—		—		24	0
Sydney FC	2014–15	A-League	26	0	0	0	—		—		26	0
Sydney FC	Total		54	0	0	0	—		—		54	0
Westerlo	2015–16	Belgian Pro League	15	1	2	0	—		—		17	1
Yanbian Funde	2016	Chinese Super League	22	3	0	0	—		—		22	3
Yanbian Funde	2017	Chinese Super League	9	0	0	0	—		—		9	0
Yanbian Funde	Total		31	3	0	0	—		—		31	3
Zemun	2017–18	Serbian SuperLiga	8	3	—		—		—		8	3
Police Tero	2018	Thai League 1	15	0	0	0	—		0	0	15	0
Sichuan Longfor	2019	China League One	10	0	0	0	—		—		10	0
Vojvodina	2019–20	Serbian SuperLiga	3	0	1	0	—		—		4	0
Career total			249	7	10	0	3	0	1	0	263	7

== Honours ==
Al Ahli Saudi

- Kings Cup: 2010–11

Red Star

- Serbian Cup: 2011–12

Individual

- Sydney FC Player of the Year: 2013–14
