= Townsville Sports Reserve =

Multi-use Sports Precinct in Townsville, Australia

Townsville Sports Precinct
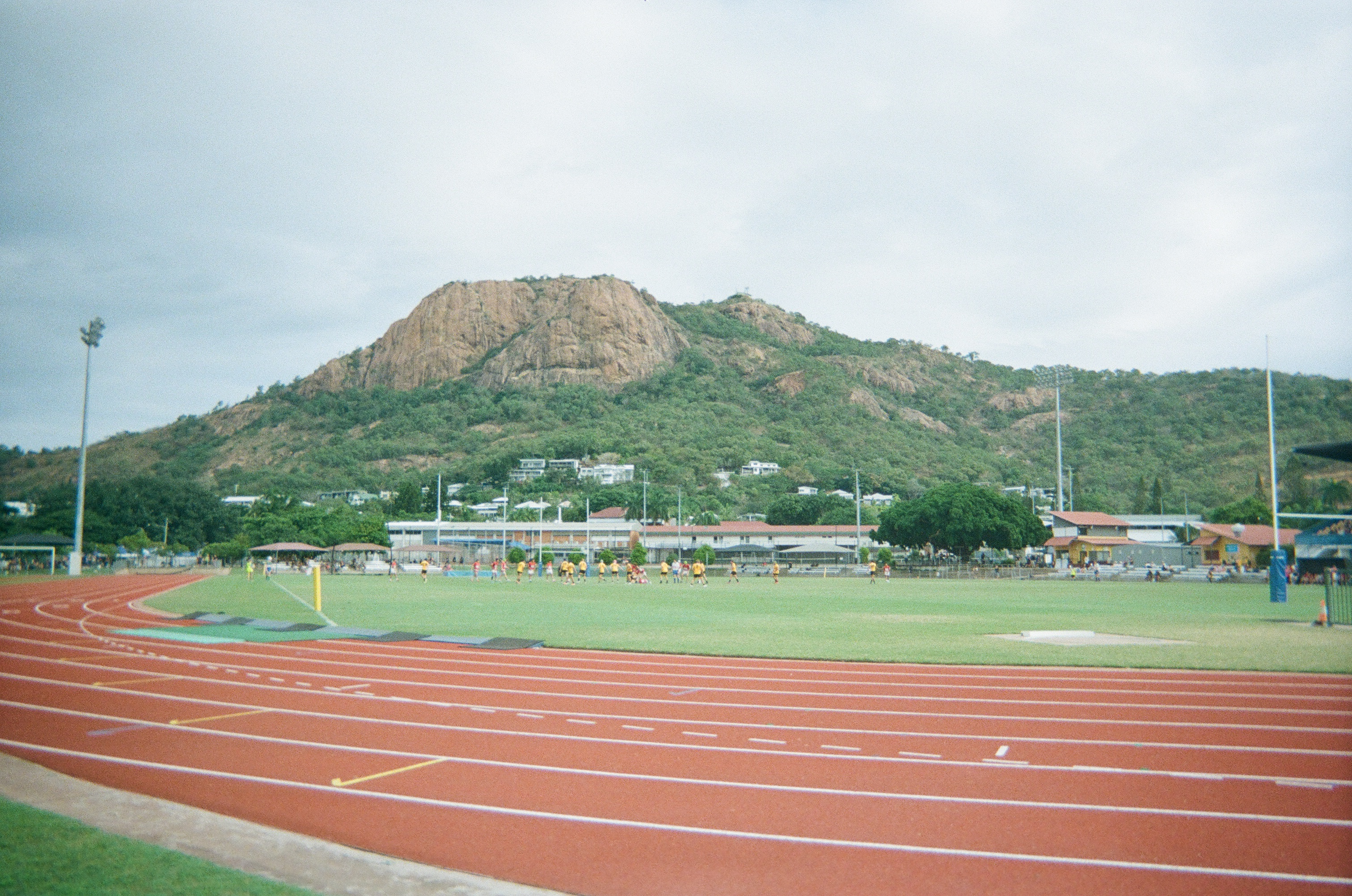
- The racetracks with Castle Hill in the background
- Interactive map of Townsville Sports Precinct
- Location: 14 Warburton Street, North Ward
- Coordinates: 19.24982°S 146.80666°E
- Capacity: 4,000 (seated); 6,500 (total)
- Surface: Grass

Townsville Sports Precinct is a multi-use sports precinct located in Townsville, Australia. With redevelopments completed in early 2022, the venue now offers three indoor multipurpose courts, multiple fields and athletics facilities with a main stadium capacity of 4000 spectators.

== Notable rugby league games ==
The results were as follows;

| Date | Result | Attendance | Notes |
|---|---|---|---|
| 17 May 1989 | Brisbane Broncos def. Parramatta Eels 42 – 6 | | 1989 Panasonic Cup Quarter final |
| 20 April 1990 | Canterbury-Bankstown Bulldogs drew with Eastern Suburbs Roosters 12 – 12 | 8,648 | 1990 NSWRL season, Round 6 |
| 1 June 1992 | Great Britain Lions def. Queensland Residents 14 – 10 | 4,000 | 1992 Great Britain Lions tour of Australasia |
| 5 July 1992 | Australia def. Papua New Guinea 36 – 14 | 12,470 | Played as part of 1989-92 Rugby League World Cup |
