= 2017–18 Sydney FC season =

Sydney FC
2017–18 season
- Chairman: Scott Barlow
- Manager: Graham Arnold
- Stadium: Allianz Stadium, Sydney
- A-League: Premiers
- A-League Finals Series: Semi-finals
- FFA Cup: Champions
- AFC Champions League: Group stage
- Top goalscorer: League: Bobô (27 goals); All: Bobô (36 goals)
- Highest home attendance: 36,057 vs Western Sydney Wanderers (21 October 2017)
- Lowest home attendance: 9,110 vs Adelaide United (8 April 2018)
- Average home league attendance: 14,593
| Home colours | Away colours | Third colours |

The 2017–18 Sydney FC season was the club's 13th season since its establishment in 2004. The club participated in the A-League for the 13th time, the FFA Cup for the fourth time, as well as the AFC Champions League for the fourth time.

== Players ==
=== Squad information ===
Note: Flags indicate national team as defined under FIFA eligibility rules; some limited exceptions apply. Players may hold more than one non-FIFA nationality.

| No. | Pos. | Nation | Player |
|---|---|---|---|
| 1 | GK | AUS | Andrew Redmayne |
| 2 | DF | AUS | Aaron Calver |
| 3 | DF | AUS | Ben Warland |
| 4 | DF | AUS | Alex Wilkinson |
| 5 | DF | NED | Jordy Buijs |
| 6 | MF | AUS | Joshua Brillante |
| 7 | DF | AUS | Michael Zullo |
| 8 | MF | AUS | Paulo Retre |
| 9 | FW | BRA | Bobô |
| 10 | MF | SRB | Miloš Ninković |
| 11 | MF | POL | Adrian Mierzejewski |

| No. | Pos. | Nation | Player |
|---|---|---|---|
| 12 | MF | POR | Fábio Ferreira |
| 13 | MF | AUS | Brandon O'Neill |
| 14 | FW | AUS | Alex Brosque (Captain) |
| 16 | MF | AUS | Anthony Kalik (on loan from Hajduk Split) |
| 17 | MF | AUS | David Carney |
| 18 | FW | AUS | Matt Simon |
| 19 | MF | AUS | Chris Zuvela (Scholarship) |
| 20 | GK | AUS | Alex Cisak |
| 23 | DF | AUS | Rhyan Grant |
| 26 | DF | AUS | Luke Wilkshire (Injury replacement) |

=== From youth squad ===
| N | Pos. | Nat. | Name | Age | Notes |
|---|---|---|---|---|---|
| 19 | MF | (Australia) | Chris Zuvela | 20 | |

=== Transfers in ===
| No. | Position | Player | Transferred from | Type/fee | Contract length | Date | Ref |
|---|---|---|---|---|---|---|---|
| 8 | MF | Paulo Retre | | Free transfer | 2 years | 22 June 2017 | |
| 20 | GK | Alex Cisak | | Free transfer | 2 years | 27 July 2017 | |
| 26 | DF | Luke Wilkshire | | Injury replacement | 1 year | 28 July 2017 | |
| 11 | MF | (Poland) Adrian Mierzejewski | | Free transfer | 3 years | 12 August 2017 | |
| 16 | MF | Anthony Kalik | (Croatia) Hajduk Split | Loan | 1 year | 1 September 2017 | |
| 3 | DF | Ben Warland | Adelaide United | Free transfer | 1.5 years | 31 January 2018 | |
| 12 | MF | (Portugal) Fábio Ferreira | | Free transfer | 6 months | 2 February 2018 | |

=== Transfers out ===
| No. | Position | Player | Transferred to | Type/fee | Date | Ref |
|---|---|---|---|---|---|---|
| 11 | MF | Bernie Ibini | (Belgium) Club Brugge | Loan return | 9 May 2017 | |
| 21 | FW | (Slovakia) Filip Hološko | | End of contract | 22 May 2017 | |
| 19 | FW | George Blackwood | | End of contract | 30 May 2017 | |
| 16 | DF | George Timotheou | (Australia) Sydney Olympic | Free transfer | 4 June 2017 | |
| 20 | GK | Danny Vukovic | (Belgium) Genk | ~$1,000,000 | 21 June 2017 | |
| 29 | FW | Bai Antoniou | | End of contract | 21 June 2017 | |
| 8 | MF | (Serbia) Miloš Dimitrijević | | Mutual contract termination | 30 June 2017 | |
| 22 | DF | Sebastian Ryall | | Mutual contract termination | 17 January 2018 | |

=== Contract extensions ===
| No. | Name | Position | Duration | Date | Notes |
|---|---|---|---|---|---|
| 10 | (Serbia) Miloš Ninković | Midfielder | 1 year | 9 May 2017 | |
| 18 | Matt Simon | Striker | 1 year | 11 May 2017 | |
| 5 | (Netherlands) Jordy Buijs | Centre back | 1 year | 15 May 2017 | |
| 9 | (Brazil) Bobô | Striker | 1 year | 16 May 2017 | |
| 14 | Alex Brosque | Striker | 1 year | 22 May 2017 | |
| 12 | Aaron Calver | Centre back | 2 years | 30 May 2017 | |
| 17 | David Carney | Midfielder | 1 year | 13 June 2017 | |
| 7 | Michael Zullo | Left-back | 2 years | 11 January 2018 | |
| 1 | Andrew Redmayne | Goalkeeper | 2 years | 13 January 2018 | |

== Technical staff ==
| Position | Name |
|---|---|
| Head coach | (Australia) Graham Arnold |
| Assistant coach | (Australia) Steve Corica |
| Assistant coach | (Australia) Phil Moss |
| Goalkeeping coach | (Australia) John Crawley |
| Strength & conditioning coach | (Australia) Andrew Clark |

== Statistics ==
=== Squad statistics ===
| N | Pos. | Nat. | Name | Total | | | | | A-League | | | | | A-League Finals Series | | | | | FFA Cup | | | | | AFC Champions League |
| N | Pos. | Nat. | Name | Apps | Goals | Yellow card | Second yellow card | Red card | Apps | Goals | Yellow card | Second yellow card | Red card | Apps | Goals | Yellow card | Second yellow card | Red card | Apps | Goals | Yellow card | Second yellow card | Red card | Apps | Goals | Yellow card | Second yellow card | Red card |
|---|---|---|---|---|---|---|---|---|---|---|---|---|---|---|---|---|---|---|---|---|---|---|---|---|---|---|---|---|
| 1 | GK | (Australia) | Andrew Redmayne | 39 | 0 | 0 | 0 | 0 | 27+0 | 0 | 0 | 0 | 0 | 1+0 | 0 | 0 | 0 | 0 | 5+0 | 0 | 0 | 0 | 0 | 6+0 | 0 | 0 | 0 | 0 |
| 2 | DF | (Australia) | Aaron Calver | 5 | 0 | 0 | 0 | 0 | 0+1 | 0 | 0 | 0 | 0 | 0+0 | 0 | 0 | 0 | 0 | 0+0 | 0 | 0 | 0 | 0 | 4+0 | 0 | 0 | 0 | 0 |
| 3 | DF | (Australia) | Ben Warland | 8 | 0 | 1 | 0 | 0 | 1+3 | 0 | 0 | 0 | 0 | 0+1 | 0 | 0 | 0 | 0 | 0+0 | 0 | 0 | 0 | 0 | 2+1 | 0 | 1 | 0 | 0 |
| 4 | DF | (Australia) | Alex Wilkinson | 36 | 0 | 1 | 0 | 0 | 26+0 | 0 | 1 | 0 | 0 | 1+0 | 0 | 0 | 0 | 0 | 3+0 | 0 | 0 | 0 | 0 | 6+0 | 0 | 0 | 0 | 0 |
| 5 | DF | (Netherlands) | Jordy Buijs | 33 | 2 | 3 | 0 | 0 | 27+0 | 0 | 2 | 0 | 0 | 1+0 | 0 | 0 | 0 | 0 | 5+0 | 2 | 1 | 0 | 0 | 0+0 | 0 | 0 | 0 | 0 |
| 6 | MF | (Australia) | Joshua Brillante | 37 | 1 | 5 | 0 | 0 | 25+0 | 1 | 4 | 0 | 0 | 1+0 | 0 | 0 | 0 | 0 | 5+0 | 0 | 0 | 0 | 0 | 6+0 | 0 | 1 | 0 | 0 |
| 7 | DF | (Australia) | Michael Zullo | 29 | 1 | 3 | 0 | 0 | 19+0 | 1 | 2 | 0 | 0 | 1+0 | 0 | 1 | 0 | 0 | 5+0 | 0 | 0 | 0 | 0 | 4+0 | 0 | 0 | 0 | 0 |
| 8 | MF | (Australia) | Paulo Retre | 27 | 0 | 1 | 0 | 0 | 7+11 | 0 | 1 | 0 | 0 | 0+0 | 0 | 0 | 0 | 0 | 1+3 | 0 | 0 | 0 | 0 | 2+3 | 0 | 0 | 0 | 0 |
| 9 | FW | (Brazil) | Bobô | 38 | 36 | 3 | 0 | 0 | 26+1 | 27 | 3 | 0 | 0 | 1+0 | 0 | 0 | 0 | 0 | 5+0 | 8 | 0 | 0 | 0 | 3+2 | 1 | 0 | 0 | 0 |
| 10 | MF | (Serbia) | Miloš Ninković | 34 | 9 | 5 | 0 | 0 | 22+2 | 6 | 5 | 0 | 0 | 1+0 | 0 | 0 | 0 | 0 | 5+0 | 2 | 0 | 0 | 0 | 4+0 | 1 | 0 | 0 | 0 |
| 11 | MF | (Poland) | Adrian Mierzejewski | 34 | 15 | 3 | 0 | 0 | 22+2 | 13 | 2 | 0 | 0 | 1+0 | 0 | 0 | 0 | 0 | 2+1 | 1 | 1 | 0 | 0 | 6+0 | 1 | 0 | 0 | 0 |
| 12 | MF | (Portugal) | Fábio Ferreira | 5 | 0 | 0 | 0 | 0 | 0+5 | 0 | 0 | 0 | 0 | 0+0 | 0 | 0 | 0 | 0 | 0+0 | 0 | 0 | 0 | 0 | 0+0 | 0 | 0 | 0 | 0 |
| 13 | MF | (Australia) | Brandon O'Neill | 36 | 2 | 10 | 0 | 0 | 26+0 | 2 | 6 | 0 | 0 | 1+0 | 0 | 0 | 0 | 0 | 4+0 | 0 | 2 | 0 | 0 | 5+0 | 0 | 2 | 0 | 0 |
| 14 | FW | (Australia) | Alex Brosque | 36 | 8 | 5 | 0 | 0 | 23+2 | 4 | 2 | 0 | 0 | 1+0 | 0 | 0 | 0 | 0 | 4+0 | 2 | 2 | 0 | 0 | 6+0 | 2 | 1 | 0 | 0 |
| 15 | MF | (Australia) | Sam McIllhatton | 0 | 0 | 0 | 0 | 0 | 0+0 | 0 | 0 | 0 | 0 | 0+0 | 0 | 0 | 0 | 0 | 0+0 | 0 | 0 | 0 | 0 | 0+0 | 0 | 0 | 0 | 0 |
| 16 | MF | (Australia) | Anthony Kalik | 7 | 0 | 0 | 0 | 0 | 0+4 | 0 | 0 | 0 | 0 | 0+0 | 0 | 0 | 0 | 0 | 0+1 | 0 | 0 | 0 | 0 | 1+1 | 0 | 0 | 0 | 0 |
| 17 | MF | (Australia) | David Carney | 35 | 6 | 4 | 0 | 0 | 15+10 | 4 | 2 | 0 | 0 | 0+1 | 0 | 1 | 0 | 0 | 3+2 | 2 | 1 | 0 | 0 | 2+2 | 0 | 0 | 0 | 0 |
| 18 | FW | (Australia) | Matt Simon | 31 | 5 | 5 | 0 | 1 | 4+17 | 2 | 1 | 0 | 1 | 0+1 | 0 | 1 | 0 | 0 | 1+4 | 2 | 1 | 0 | 0 | 2+2 | 1 | 2 | 0 | 0 |
| 19 | MF | (Australia) | Chris Zuvela | 5 | 0 | 2 | 0 | 0 | 2+0 | 0 | 0 | 0 | 0 | 0+0 | 0 | 0 | 0 | 0 | 1+0 | 0 | 1 | 0 | 0 | 2+0 | 0 | 1 | 0 | 0 |
| 20 | GK | (Australia) | Alex Cisak | 0 | 0 | 0 | 0 | 0 | 0+0 | 0 | 0 | 0 | 0 | 0+0 | 0 | 0 | 0 | 0 | 0+0 | 0 | 0 | 0 | 0 | 0+0 | 0 | 0 | 0 | 0 |
| 21 | FW | (Australia) | Charles Lokolingoy | 10 | 0 | 0 | 0 | 0 | 0+7 | 0 | 0 | 0 | 0 | 0+0 | 0 | 0 | 0 | 0 | 0+1 | 0 | 0 | 0 | 0 | 0+2 | 0 | 0 | 0 | 0 |
| 23 | DF | (Australia) | Rhyan Grant | 0 | 0 | 0 | 0 | 0 | 0+0 | 0 | 0 | 0 | 0 | 0+0 | 0 | 0 | 0 | 0 | 0+0 | 0 | 0 | 0 | 0 | 0+0 | 0 | 0 | 0 | 0 |
| 26 | DF | (Australia) | Luke Wilkshire | 33 | 2 | 7 | 0 | 0 | 24+0 | 1 | 6 | 0 | 0 | 1+0 | 0 | 0 | 0 | 0 | 3+0 | 0 | 1 | 0 | 0 | 5+0 | 1 | 0 | 0 | 0 |
| 30 | GK | (Australia) | Tom Heward-Belle | 0 | 0 | 0 | 0 | 0 | 0+0 | 0 | 0 | 0 | 0 | 0+0 | 0 | 0 | 0 | 0 | 0+0 | 0 | 0 | 0 | 0 | 0+0 | 0 | 0 | 0 | 0 |
| 32 | DF | (Australia) | William Mutch | 0 | 0 | 0 | 0 | 0 | 0+0 | 0 | 0 | 0 | 0 | 0+0 | 0 | 0 | 0 | 0 | 0+0 | 0 | 0 | 0 | 0 | 0+0 | 0 | 0 | 0 | 0 |
| 33 | DF | (Australia) | Patrick Flottmann | 1 | 0 | 0 | 0 | 0 | 0+0 | 0 | 0 | 0 | 0 | 0+0 | 0 | 0 | 0 | 0 | 1+0 | 0 | 0 | 0 | 0 | 0+0 | 0 | 0 | 0 | 0 |
| 35 | MF | (Australia) | Jackson Bandiera | 0 | 0 | 0 | 0 | 0 | 0+0 | 0 | 0 | 0 | 0 | 0+0 | 0 | 0 | 0 | 0 | 0+0 | 0 | 0 | 0 | 0 | 0+0 | 0 | 0 | 0 | 0 |
Players no longer at the club:
| 22 | DF | (Australia) | Sebastian Ryall | 7 | 2 | 0 | 0 | 0 | 1+3 | 1 | 0 | 0 | 0 | 0+0 | 0 | 0 | 0 | 0 | 2+1 | 1 | 0 | 0 | 0 | 0+0 | 0 | 0 | 0 | 0 |
| 25 | MF | (Australia) | John Iredale | 1 | 0 | 0 | 0 | 0 | 0+0 | 0 | 0 | 0 | 0 | 0+0 | 0 | 0 | 0 | 0 | 0+1 | 0 | 0 | 0 | 0 | 0+0 | 0 | 0 | 0 | 0 |
| 27 | MF | (North Macedonia) | Nicola Kuleski | 1 | 0 | 0 | 0 | 0 | 0+0 | 0 | 0 | 0 | 0 | 0+0 | 0 | 0 | 0 | 0 | 0+1 | 0 | 0 | 0 | 0 | 0+0 | 0 | 0 | 0 | 0 |

- Last updated: 28 April 2018
- Source: au.soccerway.com
- (yellow card) = Number of bookings; (second yellow card) = Number of sending offs after a second yellow card; (red card) = Number of sending offs by a direct red card.

== Preseason and friendlies ==
| 13 July 2017 Arsenal Tour | Sydney FC (Australia) | 0–2 | (England) Arsenal | Sydney, Australia |
| 20:00 AEST | | Report | Mertesacker 4'; Lacazette 83' | Stadium: ANZ Stadium; Attendance: 80,432; Referee: Shaun Evans (Australia) |

| 19 July 2017 Johnny Warren Community Challenge | Sydney FC (Australia) | 9–0 | (Australia) Earlwood Wanderers | Sydney, Australia |
| 19:30 AEST | Bobô 15', 53', 55'; Retre 20'; Buijs 29', 51'; Brosque 40', 45'; Simon 66' | Report | | Stadium: Leichhardt Oval; Referee: Adrian Arndt (Australia) |

| 25 July 2017 ACBC Cup | Macarthur Rams (Australia) | 0–4 | (Australia) Sydney FC | Sydney, Australia |
| 19:30 AEST | | Report | Ninković 68'; McIllhatton 73'; Simon 80'; Iredale 85' | Stadium: Campbelltown Stadium; Referee: Katie Patterson (Australia) |

| 9 September 2017 | Newcastle Jets (Australia) | 2–1 | (Australia) Sydney FC | Newcastle, Australia |
| 15:00 AEST | D. Petratos 12'; Shabow 71' | Report | Lokolingoy 46' | Stadium: Magic Park; Attendance: 1,327; Referee: Adrian Arndt (Australia) |

| 16 September 2017 | Sydney FC (Australia) | 0–2 | (Australia) Brisbane Roar | Sydney, Australia |
| | | Report | Maccarone; Skapetis | Stadium: Macquarie University |

| 20 September 2017 | Sydney FC (Australia) | 3–2 | (Australia) Perth Glory | Sydney, Australia |
| | Buijs 29'; Bobô 32', 77' | Report | Warren 11'; Taggart 53' | Stadium: Leichhardt Oval; Attendance: 0 (behind closed doors); Referee: Kurt Ams (Australia) |

| 28 September 2017 | Sydney FC (Australia) | 0–0 | (Australia) Central Coast Mariners | Sydney, Australia |
| | | Report | | Stadium: Allianz Stadium; Referee: Kris Griffiths-Jones (Australia) |

== Competitions ==
=== Overall ===
| Competition | Started round | Final position / round | First match | Last match |
|---|---|---|---|---|
| A-League | — | Premiers | 7 October 2017 | 14 April 2018 |
| A-League Finals | Semi-finals | Semi-finals | 28 April 2018 | 28 April 2018 |
| FFA Cup | Round of 32 | Champions | 1 August 2017 | 21 November 2017 |
| AFC Champions League | Group stage | Group stage | 14 February 2018 | 17 April 2018 |

=== A-League ===
==== League table ====
| Pos | Team | Pld | W | D | L | GF | GA | GD | Pts | Qualification |
|---|---|---|---|---|---|---|---|---|---|---|
| 1 | Sydney FC | 27 | 20 | 4 | 3 | 64 | 22 | +42 | 64 | Qualification for 2019 AFC Champions League group stage and Finals series |
| 2 | Newcastle Jets | 27 | 15 | 5 | 7 | 57 | 37 | +20 | 50 | Qualification for 2019 AFC Champions League second preliminary round and Finals series |
| 3 | Melbourne City | 27 | 13 | 4 | 10 | 41 | 33 | +8 | 43 | Qualification for Finals series |
| 4 | Melbourne Victory (C) | 27 | 12 | 5 | 10 | 43 | 37 | +6 | 41 | Qualification for 2019 AFC Champions League group stage and Finals series |
| 5 | Adelaide United | 27 | 11 | 6 | 10 | 36 | 38 | −2 | 39 | Qualification for Finals series |
| 6 | Brisbane Roar | 27 | 10 | 5 | 12 | 33 | 40 | −7 | 35 | Qualification for Finals series |
| 7 | Western Sydney Wanderers | 27 | 8 | 9 | 10 | 38 | 47 | −9 | 33 | |
| 8 | Perth Glory | 27 | 10 | 2 | 15 | 37 | 50 | −13 | 32 | |
| 9 | Wellington Phoenix (Note: Wellington Phoenix cannot qualify for the AFC Champions League as they are not recognised as an AFC club.) | 27 | 5 | 6 | 16 | 31 | 55 | −24 | 21 | |
| 10 | Central Coast Mariners | 27 | 4 | 8 | 15 | 28 | 49 | −21 | 20 | |

Source: A-Leagues
Rules for classification: 1) points; 2) goal difference; 3) number of goals scored.
(C) Champions

==== Results summary ====
| Overall | | | | | | | | Home | | | | | | Away | | | | | |
| Pld | W | D | L | GF | GA | GD | Pts | W | D | L | GF | GA | GD | W | D | L | GF | GA | GD |
|---|---|---|---|---|---|---|---|---|---|---|---|---|---|---|---|---|---|---|---|
| 27 | 20 | 4 | 3 | 64 | 22 | +42 | 64 | 10 | 3 | 1 | 36 | 13 | +23 | 10 | 1 | 2 | 28 | 9 | +19 |

Last updated: 13 April 2018.
Source: ultimatealeague.com

==== Results by round ====
| Round | 1 | 2 | 3 | 4 | 5 | 6 | 7 | 8 | 9 | 10 | 11 | 12 | 13 | 14 | 15 | 16 | 17 | 18 | 19 | 20 | 21 | 22 | 23 | 24 | 25 | 26 | 27 |
|---|---|---|---|---|---|---|---|---|---|---|---|---|---|---|---|---|---|---|---|---|---|---|---|---|---|---|---|
| Ground | A | H | H | H | A | A | H | H | A | A | H | A | H | H | A | A | H | A | H | A | H | A | H | A | A | H | H |
| Result | W | W | D | W | W | L | W | W | W | W | W | W | W | D | W | D | D | W | W | W | W | L | L | W | W | W | W |
| Position | 4 | 2 | 3 | 2 | 1 | 3 | 1 | 1 | 1 | 1 | 1 | 1 | 1 | 1 | 1 | 1 | 1 | 1 | 1 | 1 | 1 | 1 | 1 | 1 | 1 | 1 | 1 |

Source: ultimatealeague.com
A = Away; H = Home; W = Win; D = Draw; L = Loss

==== Matches ====
| 7 October 2017 1 | Melbourne Victory | 0–1 | Sydney FC | Melbourne |
| 19:50 AEDT | | Report | Deng 53' (o.g.) | Stadium: Etihad Stadium; Attendance: 24,804; Referee: Kris Griffiths-Jones |

| 15 October 2017 2 | Sydney FC | 3–2 | Wellington Phoenix | Sydney |
| 19:00 AEDT | Bobô 29', 49'; Zullo 34' | Report | Kaluđerović 44'; Vidošić 60' | Stadium: Allianz Stadium; Attendance: 11,284; Referee: Kurt Ams |

| 21 October 2017 3 | Sydney FC | 2–2 | Western Sydney Wanderers | Sydney |
| 19:50 AEDT | Bobô 38' (pen.); Brillante 61' | Report | Riera 3'; Hamill 30' | Stadium: Allianz Stadium; Attendance: 36,057; Referee: Jarred Gillett |

| 27 October 2017 4 | Sydney FC | 2–0 | Perth Glory | Sydney |
| 19:50 AEDT | Bobô 45' (pen.); Mierzejewski 90+3' (pen.) | Report | | Stadium: Allianz Stadium; Attendance: 10,063; Referee: Shaun Evans |

| 3 November 2017 5 | Melbourne City | 0–1 | Sydney FC | Melbourne |
| 19:50 AEDT | | Report | Wilkshire 59' | Stadium: AAMI Park; Attendance: 11,034; Referee: Jarred Gillett |

| 10 November 2017 6 | Central Coast Mariners | 2–0 | Sydney FC | Gosford |
| 19:50 AEDT | Hoole 19'; McGing 55' | Report | | Stadium: Central Coast Stadium; Attendance: 7,873; Referee: Adam Kersey |

| 18 November 2017 7 | Sydney FC | 2–1 | Newcastle Jets | Sydney |
| 19:50 AEDT | Ninković 5'; Bobò 59' | Report | D. Petratos 65' | Stadium: Allianz Stadium; Attendance: 11,519; Referee: Kurt Ams |

| 25 November 2017 8 | Sydney FC | 3–1 | Brisbane Roar | Sydney |
| 19:50 AEDT | Carney 8'; Mierzejewski 15' (pen.); Ryall 79' | Report | Hingert 90+3' | Stadium: Allianz Stadium; Attendance: 10,044; Referee: Alex King |

| 1 December 2017 9 | Adelaide United | 0–1 | Sydney FC | Adelaide |
| 19:20 ACDT | | Report | Bobô 45' | Stadium: Coopers Stadium; Attendance: 7,021; Referee: Peter Green |

| 9 December 2017 10 | Western Sydney Wanderers | 0–5 | Sydney FC | Sydney |
| 19:50 AEDT | | Report | Mierzejewski 14', 45'; Brosque 41'; Scott 53' (o.g.); O'Neill 76' | Stadium: ANZ Stadium; Attendance: 36,433; Referee: Jonathan Barreiro |

| 15 December 2017 11 | Sydney FC | 3–1 | Melbourne City | Sydney |
| 19:50 AEDT | Mierzejewski 44'; Bobô 45+3' (pen.); Brosque 90+6' | Report | Brattan 36' | Stadium: Allianz Stadium; Attendance: 10,688; Referee: Shaun Evans |

| 23 December 2017 12 | Wellington Phoenix | 1–4 | Sydney FC | Wellington |
| 17:35 NZDT | Kaluđerović 40' | Report | Bobô 17', 58', 86'; Mierzejewski 25' | Stadium: Westpac Stadium; Attendance: 5,432; Referee: Chris Beath |

| 30 December 2017 13 | Sydney FC | 6–0 | Perth Glory | Sydney |
| 19:50 AEDT | O'Neill 21'; Mierzejewski 58'; Brosque 62'; Bobô 67' (pen.), 90', 90+5' (pen.) | Report | | Stadium: Allianz Stadium; Attendance: 13,332; Referee: Johnathan Barreiro |

| 3 January 2018 14 | Sydney FC | 2–2 | Newcastle Jets | Sydney |
| 19:50 AEDT | Ninković 16'; Bobô 87' | Report | Nabbout 10'; Champness 62' | Stadium: Allianz Stadium; Attendance: 18,055; Referee: Jarred Gillett |

| 8 January 2018 15 | Brisbane Roar | 0–3 | Sydney FC | Brisbane |
| 18:50 AEDT | | Report | Bobô 18'; Mierzejewski 50'; Carney 86' | Stadium: Suncorp Stadium; Attendance: 7,826; Referee: Kris Griffiths-Jones |

| 14 January 2018 16 | Adelaide United | 0–0 | Sydney FC | Adelaide |
| 18:30 ACDT | | Report | | Stadium: Coopers Stadium; Attendance: 9,959; Referee: Jarred Gillett |

| 20 January 2018 17 | Sydney FC | 1–1 | Central Coast Mariners | Sydney |
| 19:50 AEDT | Bobô 61' | Report | Powell 7' (pen.) | Stadium: Allianz Stadium; Attendance: 13,511; Referee: Daniel Elder |

| 26 January 2018 18 | Melbourne Victory | 1–3 | Sydney FC | Melbourne |
| 19:50 AEDT | Berisha 58' (pen.) | Report | Bobô 60', 78' (pen.); Carney 84' | Stadium: AAMI Park; Attendance: 21,037; Referee: Jarred Gillett |

| 2 February 2018 19 | Sydney FC | 4–0 | Wellington Phoenix | Sydney |
| 19:50 AEDT | Brosque 8'; Mierzejewski 14'; Ninković 74'; Carney 85' | Report | | Stadium: Allianz Stadium; Attendance: 10,220; Referee: Kris Griffiths-Jones |

| 10 February 2018 20 | Melbourne City | 0–4 | Sydney FC | Melbourne |
| 19:50 AEDT | | Report | Bobô 32', 65'; Ninkovic 43'; Mierzejewski 79' | Stadium: AAMI Park; Attendance: 8,587; Referee: Kurt Ams |

| 25 February 2018 21 | Sydney FC | 3–1 | Western Sydney Wanderers | Sydney |
| 19:00 AEDT | Mierzejewski 44', 55'; Bobô 73' | Report | Riera 10' | Stadium: Allianz Stadium; Attendance: 25,211; Referee: Peter Green |

| 3 March 2018 22 | Newcastle Jets | 2–1 | Sydney FC | Newcastle |
| 17:35 AEDT | D. Petratos 43'; Nabbout 56' | Report | Bobô 52' | Stadium: McDonald Jones Stadium; Attendance: 18,156; Referee: Chris Beath |

| 17 March 2018 23 | Sydney FC | 1–2 | Brisbane Roar | Sydney |
| AEDT | Ninković 59' | Report | McKay 9'; Pepper 18' | Stadium: Allianz Stadium; Attendance: 10,890; Referee: Kurt Ams |

| 24 March 2018 24 | Central Coast Mariners | 1–2 | Sydney FC | Gosford |
| 17:35 AEDT | McGing 82' | Report | Ninković 32'; Simon 90+3' | Stadium: Central Coast Stadium; Attendance: 7,082; Referee: Peter Green |

| 29 March 2018 25 | Perth Glory | 2–3 | Sydney FC | Perth |
| 18:30 AWST | Taggart 72', 89' | Report | Mierzejewski 12'; Bobô 29' (pen.), 39' | Stadium: nib Stadium; Attendance: 7,742; Referee: Kris Griffiths-Jones |

| 8 April 2018 26 | Sydney FC | 3–0 | Adelaide United | Sydney |
| 19:00 AEST | Simon 45+3'; Bobô 59', 66' | Report | | Stadium: Allianz Stadium; Attendance: 9,110; Referee: Shaun Evans |

| 13 April 2018 27 | Sydney FC | 1–0 | Melbourne Victory | Sydney |
| 19:50 AEST | Bobô 8' | Report | | Stadium: Allianz Stadium; Attendance: 15,567; Referee: Chris Beath |

==== Finals series ====
| 28 April 2018 Semi-final | Sydney FC | 2–3 (a.e.t.) | Melbourne Victory | Sydney |
| 19:50 AEST | Nigro 23' (o.g.); Antonis 90+4' (o.g.) | Report | Barbarouses 30'; Troisi 46'; Antonis 116' | Stadium: Allianz Stadium; Attendance: 17,775; Referee: Kurt Ams |

=== FFA Cup ===
| 1 August 2017 Round of 32 | Darwin Rovers (Northern Territory) | 0–8 | (New South Wales) Sydney FC | Darwin |
| 19:00 ACST | | Report | Bobô 24', 34' (pen.), 76', 84'; Carney 40'; Simon 52'; Buijs 58'; Ninković 72' | Stadium: Darwin Football Stadium; Attendance: 2,680; Referee: Daniel Elder |

| 29 August 2017 Round of 16 | Bankstown Berries (New South Wales) | 0–3 | (New South Wales) Sydney FC | Sydney |
| 19:30 AEST | | Report | Brosque 5'; Bobô 61'; Mierzejewski 90+1' (pen.) | Stadium: Sydney United Sports Centre; Attendance: 2,180; Referee: Ben Abraham |

| 13 September 2017 Quarter-finals | Sydney FC (New South Wales) | 2–0 | (Victoria (state)) Melbourne City | Sydney |
| 19:30 AEST | Buijs 7'; Brosque 51' | Report | | Stadium: Leichhardt Oval; Attendance: 4,102; Referee: Kris Griffiths-Jones |

| 11 October 2017 Semi-finals | South Melbourne (Victoria (state)) | 1–5 | (New South Wales) Sydney FC | Melbourne |
| 19:30 AEDT | Minopoulos 47' | Report | Carney 4'; Bobô 17', 66'; Ryall 73'; Simon 83' | Stadium: Lakeside Stadium; Attendance: 5,747; Referee: Chris Beath |

| 21 November 2017 Final | Sydney FC (New South Wales) | 2–1 (a.e.t.) | (South Australia) Adelaide United | Sydney |
| 19:30 AEDT | Ninkovic 19'; Bobô 111' | Report | Mileusnic 67' | Stadium: Allianz Stadium; Attendance: 13,452; Referee: Kris Griffiths-Jones |

=== AFC Champions League ===
==== Results summary ====
| Overall | | | | | | | | Home | | | | | | Away | | | | | |
| Pld | W | D | L | GF | GA | GD | Pts | W | D | L | GF | GA | GD | W | D | L | GF | GA | GD |
|---|---|---|---|---|---|---|---|---|---|---|---|---|---|---|---|---|---|---|---|
| 6 | 1 | 3 | 2 | 7 | 8 | −1 | 6 | 0 | 1 | 2 | 0 | 4 | −4 | 1 | 2 | 0 | 7 | 4 | +3 |

Last updated: 3 April 2018.

==== Results by stage ====
| Stage | 1 | 2 | 3 | 4 | 5 | 6 |
|---|---|---|---|---|---|---|
| Ground | H | A | H | A | A | H |
| Result | L | D | L | D | W | D |
| Position | 4 | 4 | 4 | 4 | 3 | 3 |

Updated to match(es) played on 3 April 2018. Source:
A = Away; H = Home; W = Win; D = Draw; L = Loss

==== Group stage ====
| Pos | Team | Pld | W | D | L | GF | GA | GD | Pts | Qualification |
|---|---|---|---|---|---|---|---|---|---|---|
| 1 | (South Korea) Suwon Samsung Bluewings | 6 | 3 | 1 | 2 | 8 | 7 | +1 | 10 | Advance to knockout stage |
| 2 | (Japan) Kashima Antlers | 6 | 2 | 3 | 1 | 8 | 6 | +2 | 9 | Advance to knockout stage |
| 3 | (Australia) Sydney FC | 6 | 1 | 3 | 2 | 7 | 8 | −1 | 6 | |
| 4 | (China) Shanghai Shenhua | 6 | 0 | 5 | 1 | 6 | 8 | −2 | 5 | |

Source: AFC
Rules for classification: Group stage tiebreakers

| 14 February 2018 1 | Sydney FC (Australia) | 0–2 | (South Korea) Suwon Samsung Bluewings | Sydney, Australia |
| 19:30 AEDT | | Report | Dejan 62', 76' (pen.) | Stadium: Sydney Football Stadium; Attendance: 6,349; Referee: Mohammed Abdulla (United Arab Emirates) |

| 21 February 2018 2 | Shanghai Shenhua (China) | 2–2 | (Australia) Sydney FC | Shanghai, China |
| 20:00 CST | Martins 26'; Guarín 39' | Report | Wilkshire 28'; Brosque 34' | Stadium: Hongkou Football Stadium; Attendance: 22,918; Referee: Valentin Kovalenko (Uzbekistan) |

| 7 March 2018 3 | Sydney FC (Australia) | 0–2 | (Japan) Kashima Antlers | Sydney, Australia |
| 19:30 AEDT | | Report | Doi 40'; Ueda 87' | Stadium: Sydney Football Stadium; Attendance: 6,442; Referee: Ahmed Al-Kaf (Oman) |

| 13 March 2018 4 | Kashima Antlers (Japan) | 1–1 | (Australia) Sydney FC | Kashima, Japan |
| 19:00 JST | Kanazaki 25' | Report | Simon 70' | Stadium: Kashima Soccer Stadium; Attendance: 8,593; Referee: Khamis Al-Marri (Qatar) |

| 3 April 2018 5 | Suwon Samsung Bluewings (South Korea) | 1–4 | (Australia) Sydney FC | Suwon, South Korea |
| 19:30 KST | Dejan 24' | Report | Ninković 23'; Brosque 31'; Mierzejewski 79'; Bobô 90+1' | Stadium: Suwon World Cup Stadium; Attendance: 3,756; Referee: Fahad Al-Mirdasi (Saudi Arabia) |

| 17 April 2018 6 | Sydney FC (Australia) | 0–0 | (China) Shanghai Shenhua | Sydney, Australia |
| 20:00 AEST | | Report | | Stadium: Sydney Football Stadium; Attendance: 9,855; Referee: Mohanad Qassim (Iraq) |

== End-of-season awards ==
On 19 May, 2018, Sydney FC hosted their annual Sky Blue Ball and presented eight awards on the night.

| Award | Men's | Women's |
|---|---|---|
| Player of the Year | Bobô (Men's); Jeremy Cox (U-20's) | Chloe Logarzo |
| Member's Player of the Year | Adrian Mierzejewski | |
| Golden Boot | Bobô | Lisa De Vanna & Kylie Ledbrook |
| Rising Star | Marco Tilio | |
| Chairman's Award | Trudi Johnston (Kit Manager) | |
