= 2016–17 Perth Glory FC season =

Perth Glory
2016–17 season
- Chairman: Tony Sage
- Manager: Kenny Lowe
- Stadium: nib Stadium, Perth
- A-League: 5th
- A-League Finals Series: Semi-finals
- FFA Cup: Round of 16
- Top goalscorer: League: Adam Taggart, Diego Castro & Andy Keogh (12 goals); All: Diego Castro (13 goals)
- Highest home attendance: 13,290 vs Western Sydney Wanderers; 6 November 2016
- Lowest home attendance: 8,834 vs Brisbane Roar; 8 April 2017
- Average home league attendance: 10,533
Home colours	Away colours

The 2016–17 Perth Glory FC season was the club's 20th season since its establishment in 1996. The club participated in the A-League for the 12th time and the FFA Cup for the third time.

== Players ==
=== Squad information ===
Squad as of 2 October 2016. Note: Flags indicate national team as defined under FIFA eligibility rules; some limited exceptions apply. Players may hold more than one non-FIFA nationality.

No.	Pos.	Nation	Player
2	DF	AUS	Alex Grant
3	DF	AUS	Marc Warren
4	DF	AUS	Shane Lowry
5	MF	AUS	Rhys Williams
6	DF	AUS	Dino Djulbic
7	FW	AUS	Joel Chianese
8	MF	AUS	Rostyn Griffiths (Captain)
9	FW	IRL	Andy Keogh (Vice-captain)
10	MF	SRB	Nebojša Marinković
11	MF	AUS	Richard Garcia
13	GK	AUS	Nick Feely
14	FW	AUS	Chris Harold

No.	Pos.	Nation	Player
15	MF	AUS	Brandon Wilson
16	DF	ENG	Joseph Mills
17	MF	ESP	Diego Castro
18	MF	AUS	Mitchell Oxborrow
19	DF	AUS	Josh Risdon
20	DF	AUS	Aryn Williams
21	FW	AUS	Jamal Reiners
22	FW	AUS	Adam Taggart
23	FW	AUS	Kosta Petratos
26	DF	ROU	Lucian Goian (Injury replacement)
30	GK	AUS	Jordan Thurtell
33	GK	AUS	Liam Reddy

=== From youth squad ===
N	Pos.	Nat.	Name	Age	Notes

=== Transfers in ===
No.	Pos.	Nat.	Name	Age	Moving from	Type	Transfer window	Ends	Transfer fee	Source
5	MF	(Australia)	Rhys Williams	27	Middlesbrough (England)	Transfer	Pre-season	2017	Free	
	MF	(Australia)	Chris Herd	27		Transfer	Pre-season	2018	Free	
16	DF	(England)	Joseph Mills	26		Transfer	Pre-season	2018	Free	
13	GK	(Australia)	Nick Feely	24		Transfer	Pre-season	2017	Free	
33	GK	(Australia)	Liam Reddy	34		Transfer	Pre-season	2017	Free	
15	MF	(Australia)	Brandon Wilson	19	Burnley (England)	Transfer	Pre-season	2017	Free	
8	MF	(Australia)	Rostyn Griffiths	28		Transfer	Pre-season	2018	Free	
24	MF	(Serbia)	Milan Smiljanić	29	Maccabi Netanya (Israel)	Transfer	Pre-season	2017	Free	
7	FW	(Australia)	Joel Chianese	26		Transfer	Pre-season	2017	Free	
26	DF	(Romania)	Lucian Goian	34		Injury replacement	Mid-season	2017	Free	

=== Transfers out ===
No.	Pos.	Nat.	Name	Age	Moving to	Type	Transfer window	Transfer fee	Source
7	MF	(Hungary)	György Sándor	32		End of contract	Pre-season		
8	MF	(Australia)	Ruben Zadkovich	29		Retired	Pre-season		
13	MF	(Australia)	Diogo Ferreira	26		End of contract	Pre-season		
15	MF	(Australia)	Hagi Gligor	21		End of contract	Pre-season		
23	MF	(Hungary)	Krisztián Vadócz	30		End of contract	Pre-season		
12	GK	(Australia)	Jerrad Tyson	26		End of contract	Pre-season		
1	GK	(Australia)	Ante Covic	41		End of contract	Pre-season		
	MF	(Australia)	Chris Herd	27		Mutual termination	Pre-season		
24	MF	(Serbia)	Milan Smiljanić	30		Mutual termination	Mid-season		

=== Contract extensions ===
Name	Position	Duration	Contract Expiry	Notes
(Australia) Marc Warren	Left-back	1 year	2017	
(Australia) Jordan Thurtell	Goalkeeper	1 year	2017	
(Spain) Diego Castro	Winger	1 year	2017	
(Australia) Richard Garcia	Winger	1 year	2017	

== Technical staff ==
Position	Name
Manager	(England) Kenny Lowe
Assistant Manager	(England) Andrew Ord
Youth Team Manager	(Australia) John Gibson
Goalkeeping Coach	(Australia) Danny Milosevic
Strength & Conditioning Coach	(Australia) Toby Horak
Physiotherapist	(Australia) Chris Hutchinson

== Statistics ==
=== Squad statistics ===
N	Pos.	Nat.	Name	Total					A-League					FFA Cup
N	Pos.	Nat.	Name	Apps	Goals	Yellow card	Second yellow card	Red card	Apps	Goals	Yellow card	Second yellow card	Red card	Apps	Goals	Yellow card	Second yellow card	Red card
2	DF	(Australia)	Alex Grant	11	1	4	0	0	10+0	1	3	0	0	1+0	0	1	0	0
3	DF	(Australia)	Marc Warren	15	0	6	0	0	10+3	0	5	0	0	2+0	0	1	0	0
4	DF	(Australia)	Shane Lowry	13	0	4	0	0	10+3	0	4	0	0	0+0	0	0	0	0
5	MF	(Australia)	Rhys Williams	18	0	8	0	0	13+3	0	8	0	0	2+0	0	0	0	0
6	DF	(Australia)	Dino Djulbic	24	2	6	0	1	22+0	0	6	0	1	2+0	2	0	0	0
7	FW	(Australia)	Joel Chianese	23	2	1	0	0	7+16	2	1	0	0	0+0	0	0	0	0
8	MF	(Australia)	Rostyn Griffiths	26	3	5	1	0	22+2	3	5	1	0	2+0	0	0	0	0
9	FW	(Republic of Ireland)	Andy Keogh	30	12	5	0	0	28+0	12	5	0	0	2+0	0	0	0	0
10	MF	(Serbia)	Nebojša Marinković	25	6	3	0	0	12+11	6	3	0	0	2+0	0	0	0	0
11	FW	(Australia)	Richard Garcia	9	1	1	0	0	5+2	1	1	0	0	0+2	0	0	0	0
13	GK	(Australia)	Nick Feely	2	0	0	0	0	1+1	0	0	0	0	0+0	0	0	0	0
14	FW	(Australia)	Chris Harold	30	3	4	0	0	22+6	3	3	0	0	2+0	0	1	0	0
15	MF	(Australia)	Brandon Wilson	24	0	7	0	0	14+8	0	6	0	0	1+1	0	1	0	0
16	DF	(England)	Joseph Mills	23	0	4	0	0	19+3	0	4	0	0	1+0	0	0	0	0
17	MF	(Spain)	Diego Castro	27	13	4	0	0	26+1	13	4	0	0	0+0	0	0	0	0
18	DF	(Australia)	Mitchell Oxborrow	5	0	1	0	0	3+2	0	1	0	0	0+0	0	0	0	0
19	DF	(Australia)	Josh Risdon	27	0	7	0	0	26+0	0	7	0	0	1+0	0	0	0	0
20	DF	(Australia)	Aryn Williams	7	0	0	0	0	4+3	0	0	0	0	0+0	0	0	0	0
21	FW	(Australia)	Jamal Reiners	2	0	0	0	0	0+1	0	0	0	0	0+1	0	0	0	0
22	FW	(Australia)	Adam Taggart	25	12	0	0	0	20+4	12	0	0	0	0+1	0	0	0	0
23	FW	(Australia)	Kosta Petratos	2	0	0	0	0	1+1	0	0	0	0	0+0	0	0	0	0
26	DF	(Romania)	Lucian Goian	6	0	4	0	0	6+0	0	4	0	0	0+0	0	0	0	0
28	FW	(Australia)	Joe Knowles	4	0	0	0	0	0+2	0	0	0	0	2+0	0	0	0	0
30	GK	(Australia)	Jordan Thurtell	0	0	0	0	0	0+0	0	0	0	0	0+0	0	0	0	0
33	GK	(Australia)	Liam Reddy	30	0	1	0	1	28+0	0	1	0	1	2+0	0	0	0	0
Players no longer at the club:
24	MF	(Serbia)	Milan Smiljanić	16	0	1	0	0	10+5	0	1	0	0	0+1	0	0	0	0

- Last updated: 29 April 2017
- Source: au.soccerway.com
- (yellow card) = Number of bookings; (second yellow card) = Number of sending offs after a second yellow card; (red card) = Number of sending offs by a direct red card.

== Pre-season and friendlies ==
20 July 2016 Philippines Tour	Global (Philippines)	0–0	(Australia) Perth Glory	Manila, Philippines
15:30 PST		Report		Stadium: Rizal Memorial Stadium

23 July 2016 Philippines Tour	UFL All-Stars (Philippines)	1–2	(Australia) Perth Glory	Manila, Philippines
	Clark 13'	Report	Harold 22'; Keogh 45+1'	Stadium: Rizal Memorial Stadium

26 July 2016 Philippines Tour	Philippines	0–2	(Australia) Perth Glory	Bantay, Philippines
		Report	Knowles 67'; Garcia 90+2'	Stadium: Quirino Stadium

17 August 2016 Heritage Cup	WA State Team (Western Australia)	0–1	(Australia) Perth Glory	Perth, Australia
19:00 AWST		Report	Harold 45+2'	Stadium: Inglewood Stadium; Attendance: 500; Referee: Adam Fielding

25 August 2016	Perth Glory (Australia)	2–2	Iraq	Perth, Australia
	Petratos 81'; Garcia 84'	Report	30' (o.g.); Shokan 45'	Stadium: Dalmatinac Park; Attendance: 0 (behind closed doors); Referee: Chris Beath

16 September 2016	Perth Glory (Australia)	8–0	(Australia) Combined Inglewood/Floreat team	Perth, Australia
19:30 AWST	K. Petratos 10', 23'; Castro 19'; Oxborrow 64'; Reiners 71', 73', 87'; Knowles 90'	Report		Stadium: Inglewood Stadium

20 September 2016	Perth Glory (Australia)	0–4	(Australia) Brisbane Roar	Sydney, Australia
15:00 AEST		Report	Risdon 35' (o.g.); Maclaren 38'; D. Petratos 65'; Broich 71'	Stadium: Leichhardt Oval; Attendance: 0 (behind closed doors)

== Competitions ==
=== Overview ===
Competition	First match	Last match	Starting round	Final position	Record							
Competition	First match	Last match	Starting round	Final position	Pld	W	D	L	GF	GA	GD	Win %
A-League	8 October 2016	16 April 2017	Matchday 1	2nd	27	10	9	8	53	53	+0	37.04
A-League Finals	23 April 2017	29 April 2017	Elimination-finals	Semi-finals	2	1	0	1	2	3	−1	50.00
FFA Cup	10 August 2016	30 August 2016	Round of 32	Semi-finals	2	1	0	1	2	2	+0	50.00
Total					31	12	9	10	57	58	−1	38.71

Source: Competitions

=== A-League ===
==== League table ====
Pos	Team	Pld	W	D	L	GF	GA	GD	Pts	Qualification
1	Sydney FC (C)	27	20	6	1	55	12	+43	66	Qualification for 2018 AFC Champions League group stage and Finals series
2	Melbourne Victory	27	15	4	8	49	31	+18	49	Qualification for 2018 AFC Champions League group stage and Finals series
3	Brisbane Roar	27	11	9	7	43	37	+6	42	Qualification for 2018 AFC Champions League second preliminary round and Finals series
4	Melbourne City	27	11	6	10	49	44	+5	39	Qualification for Finals series
5	Perth Glory	27	10	9	8	53	53	0	39	Qualification for Finals series
6	Western Sydney Wanderers	27	8	12	7	35	35	0	36	Qualification for Finals series
7	Wellington Phoenix (Note: Wellington Phoenix cannot qualify for the AFC Champions League as they are not recognised as an AFC club.)	27	8	6	13	41	46	−5	30	
8	Central Coast Mariners	27	6	5	16	31	52	−21	23	
9	Adelaide United	27	5	8	14	25	46	−21	23	
10	Newcastle Jets	27	5	7	15	28	53	−25	22	

Source: A-Leagues
Rules for classification: 1) points; 2) goal difference; 3) number of goals scored.
(C) Champions

==== Results summary ====
Overall								Home						Away					
Pld	W	D	L	GF	GA	GD	Pts	W	D	L	GF	GA	GD	W	D	L	GF	GA	GD
27	10	9	8	53	53	0	39	8	3	3	31	26	+5	2	6	5	22	27	−5

Last updated: 16 April 2017.
Source: ultimatealeague.com

==== Results by round ====
Round	1	2	3	4	5	6	7	8	9	10	11	12	13	14	15	16	17	18	19	20	21	22	23	24	25	26	27
Ground	H	H	A	A	H	A	H	A	A	H	H	A	A	H	A	H	A	H	A	H	H	A	A	H	A	H	H
Result	D	W	W	L	D	L	W	L	D	L	L	D	D	W	D	W	L	W	W	D	W	D	L	L	D	W	W
Position	3	4	2	4	4	5	4	5	5	5	6	6	5	5	5	5	5	5	5	5	3	5	5	5	6	5	5

Updated to match(es) played on 16 April 2017. Source: ultimatealeague.com
A = Away; H = Home; W = Win; D = Draw; L = Loss

==== Matches ====
8 October 2016 1	Perth Glory	3–3	Central Coast Mariners	Perth
19:00 AWST	Taggart 4', 27'; Castro 35' (pen.)	Report	O'Donovan 56', 86' (pen.); Reddy 84' (o.g.)	Stadium: nib Stadium; Attendance: 9,501; Referee: Chris Beath

16 October 2016 2	Perth Glory	2–0	Wellington Phoenix	Perth
16:00 AWST	Castro 48' (pen.); Marinković 66'	Report		Stadium: nib Stadium; Attendance: 11,209; Referee: Daniel Elder

21 October 2016 3	Melbourne City	2–3	Perth Glory	Melbourne
19:50 AEDT	Fornaroli 44' (pen.); Brandán 60'	Report	Keogh 7', 49', 85'	Stadium: AAMI Park; Attendance: 8,076; Referee: Alan Milliner

30 October 2016 4	Brisbane Roar	2–1	Perth Glory	Brisbane
16:00 AEST	Maclaren 31'; Borrello 75'	Report	Marinković 54'	Stadium: Suncorp Stadium; Attendance: 13,428; Referee: Jonathan Barreiro

6 November 2016 5	Perth Glory	2–2	Western Sydney Wanderers	Perth
16:00 AWST	Grant 5'; Keogh 51'	Report	N. Martínez 1'; Šantalab 67'	Stadium: nib Stadium; Attendance: 13,290; Referee: Kurt Ams

13 November 2016 6	Sydney FC	4–1	Perth Glory	Sydney
17:00 AEDT	Ninković 14', 80'; Bobô 41'; Brosque 88'	Report	R. Grant 62' (o.g.)	Stadium: Allianz Stadium; Attendance: 14,167; Referee: Peter Green

18 November 2016 7	Perth Glory	3–1	Adelaide United	Perth
19:00 AWST	Griffiths 25'; Keogh 67', 90+4'	Report	Risdon 22' (o.g.)	Stadium: nib Stadium; Attendance: 10,011; Referee: Jarred Gillett

24 November 2016 8	Central Coast Mariners	2–0	Perth Glory	Gosford
19:50 AEDT	Ascroft 30'; O'Donovan 63'	Report		Stadium: Central Coast Stadium; Attendance: 5,296; Referee: Shaun Evans

2 December 2016 9	Melbourne Victory	1–1	Perth Glory	Melbourne
19:50 AEDT	Berisha 41'	Report	Keogh 17'	Stadium: AAMI Park; Attendance: 16,017; Referee: Chris Beath

10 December 2016 10	Perth Glory	1–2	Newcastle Jets	Perth
19:00 AWST	Marinković 7'	Report	Hoole 21'; Smiljanić 45+1'	Stadium: nib Stadium; Attendance: 9,202; Referee: Daniel Elder

17 December 2016 11	Perth Glory	1–4	Sydney FC	Perth
19:00 AWST	Taggart 20'	Report	Brosque 21'; Hološko 61'; Bobô 71'; Ibini 90+1' (pen.)	Stadium: nib Stadium; Attendance: 9,119; Referee: Alan Milliner

27 December 2016 12	Melbourne City	3–3	Perth Glory	Melbourne
19:50 AEDT	Cahill 9'; Fornaroli 36', 61' (pen.)	Report	Castro 21', 40'; Harold 64'	Stadium: AAMI Park; Attendance: 11,269; Referee: Shaun Evans

1 January 2017 13	Western Sydney Wanderers	1–1	Perth Glory	Sydney
19:50 AEDT	Sotirio 66'	Report	Taggart 16'	Stadium: ANZ Stadium; Attendance: 12,203; Referee: Jarred Gillett

5 January 2017 14	Perth Glory	2–1	Wellington Phoenix	Perth
18:00 AWST	Griffiths 45+1'; Taggart 51'	Report	Krishna 11'	Stadium: nib Stadium; Attendance: 9,210; Referee: Shaun Evans

15 January 2017 15	Newcastle Jets	2–2	Perth Glory	Newcastle
17:00 AEDT	Poljak 37' (pen.); Nabbout 45+1'	Report	Taggart 7'; Keogh 56'	Stadium: McDonald Jones Stadium; Attendance: 9,174; Referee: Stephen Lucas

21 January 2017 16	Perth Glory	2–1	Melbourne Victory	Perth
17:00 AWST	Marinković 77'; Taggart 84'	Report	Berisha 58' (pen.)	Stadium: nib Stadium; Attendance: 11,271; Referee: Peter Green

28 January 2017 17	Central Coast Mariners	2–0	Perth Glory	Gosford
17:35 AEDT	Bingham 47'; Ferreira 52' (pen.)	Report		Stadium: Central Coast Stadium; Attendance: 7,205; Referee: Kris Griffiths-Jones

4 February 2017 18	Perth Glory	3–2	Newcastle Jets	Perth
19:00 AWST	Castro 13' (pen.), 42'; Taggart 59'	Report	Hoole 37'; Hoffman 71'	Stadium: nib Stadium; Attendance: 12,903; Referee: Jonathan Barreiro

10 February 2017 19	Adelaide United	0–5	Perth Glory	Adelaide
20:20 ACDT		Report	La Rocca 15' (o.g.); Castro 37', 88'; Keogh 45+1'; Taggart 46'	Stadium: Coopers Stadium; Attendance: 6,006; Referee: Chris Beath

18 February 2017 20	Perth Glory	2–2	Brisbane Roar	Perth
19:00 AWST	Marinković 38'; Taggart 48'	Report	Maclaren 31'; D. Ingham 40'	Stadium: nib Stadium; Attendance: 10,762; Referee: Jarred Gillett

25 February 2017 21	Perth Glory	2–0	Western Sydney Wanderers	Perth
19:00 AWST	Harold 45+2'; Chianese 90+4'	Report		Stadium: nib Stadium; Attendance: 9,789; Referee: Jonathan Barreiro

4 March 2017 22	Wellington Phoenix	3–3	Perth Glory	Auckland
19:35 NZDT	Finkler 10'; Krishna 25'; Barbarouses 47'	Report	Keogh 34'; Taggart 67'; Castro 81'	Stadium: QBE Stadium; Attendance: 6,285; Referee: Stephen Lucas

11 March 2017 23	Melbourne Victory	4–1	Perth Glory	Melbourne
19:50 AEDT	Berisha 23'; Ben Khalfallah 42'; Rojas 48'; Troisi 74'	Report	Castro 5'	Stadium: AAMI Park; Attendance: 16,814; Referee: Kurt Ams

26 March 2017 24	Perth Glory	0–3	Sydney FC	Perth
16:00 AWST		Report	Goian 38' (o.g.); O'Neill 41'; Bobô 62'	Stadium: nib Stadium; Attendance: 10,097; Referee: Kris Griffiths-Jones

31 March 2017 25	Adelaide United	1–1	Perth Glory	Adelaide
19:20 ACDT	McGowan 23'	Report	Castro 45+1' (pen.)	Stadium: Coopers Stadium; Attendance: 7,307; Referee: Alan Milliner

8 April 2017 26	Perth Glory	3–1	Brisbane Roar	Perth
19:00 AWST	Garcia 35'; Keogh 67'; Griffiths 76'	Report	Holman 57'	Stadium: nib Stadium; Attendance: 8,834; Referee: Chris Beath

16 April 2017 27	Perth Glory	5–4	Melbourne City	Perth
17:00 AWST	Castro 4' (pen.); Keogh 51'; Harold 55'; Marinković 75'; Taggart 88'	Report	Cahill 21', 80'; Colazo 84'; Fitzgerald 90'	Stadium: nib Stadium; Attendance: 12,261; Referee: Peter Green

==== Finals series ====
23 April 2017 Elimination-final	Melbourne City	0–2	Perth Glory	Melbourne
19:00 AEST		Report	Castro 16'; Chianese 30'	Stadium: AAMI Park; Attendance: 9,944; Referee: Chris Beath

29 April 2017 Semi-final	Sydney FC	3–0	Perth Glory	Sydney
19:50 AEST	Brillante 21'; Buijs 37'; Hološko 45+1'	Report		Stadium: Allianz Stadium; Attendance: 21,938; Referee: Peter Green

=== FFA Cup ===
10 August 2016 Round of 32	Brisbane Roar (Queensland)	0–2	(Western Australia) Perth Glory	Brisbane
19:30 AEST		Report	Djulbic 12', 19'	Stadium: Ballymore Stadium; Attendance: 3,028; Referee: Chris Beath

30 August 2016 Round of 16	Perth Glory (Western Australia)	0–2 (a.e.t.)	(New South Wales) Sydney FC	Perth
18:30 AWST		Report	Ninković 98'; Brosque 113'	Stadium: Dorrien Gardens; Attendance: 2,661; Referee: Adam Fielding
