= 2016–17 Sydney FC season =

Sydney FC
2016–17 season
- Chairman: Scott Barlow
- Manager: Graham Arnold
- Stadium: Allianz Stadium, Sydney
- A-League: Premiers
- A-League Finals Series: Champions
- FFA Cup: Runners-up
- Top goalscorer: League: Bobô (15 goals); All: Bobô (16 goals)
- Highest home attendance: 40,143 vs Western Sydney Wanderers (14 January 2017)
- Lowest home attendance: 8,380 vs Wellington Phoenix (9 February 2017)
- Average home league attendance: 16,001
Home colours	Away colours	Third colours

The 2016–17 Sydney FC season was the club's 12th season since its establishment in 2004. The club participated in the A-League for the 12th time, the FFA Cup for the 3rd time.

== Players ==
=== Squad information ===
Note: Flags indicate national team as defined under FIFA eligibility rules; some limited exceptions apply. Players may hold more than one non-FIFA nationality.

No.	Pos.	Nation	Player
1	GK	AUS	Andrew Redmayne
4	DF	AUS	Alex Wilkinson
5	DF	NED	Jordy Buijs
6	MF	AUS	Joshua Brillante
7	DF	AUS	Michael Zullo
8	MF	SRB	Miloš Dimitrijević
9	FW	BRA	Bobô
10	MF	SRB	Miloš Ninković
11	MF	AUS	Bernie Ibini (On loan from Club Brugge)
12	DF	AUS	Aaron Calver
13	MF	AUS	Brandon O'Neill

No.	Pos.	Nation	Player
14	FW	AUS	Alex Brosque (Captain)
16	DF	AUS	George Timotheou (Youth)
17	MF	AUS	David Carney
18	FW	AUS	Matt Simon
19	FW	AUS	George Blackwood
20	GK	AUS	Danny Vukovic
21	FW	SVK	Filip Hološko
22	DF	AUS	Sebastian Ryall (Vice-captain)
23	MF	AUS	Rhyan Grant
24	FW	AUS	Charles Lokolingoy (Youth)
29	FW	AUS	Bai Antoniou (Youth)

=== From youth squad ===
N	Pos.	Nat.	Name	Age	Notes
16	DF	(Australia)	George Timotheou	19	
24	FW	(Australia)	Charles Lokolingoy	19	
29	FW	(Australia)	Bai Antoniou	19	

=== Transfers in ===
No.	Pos.	Nat.	Name	Age	Moving from	Type	Transfer window	Ends	Transfer fee	Source
4	DF	(Australia)	Alex Wilkinson	31	Melbourne City	Transfer	Pre-season	2018	Free	
7	DF	(Australia)	Michael Zullo	27	Melbourne City	Transfer	Pre-season	2018	Free	
6	MF	(Australia)	Joshua Brillante	23	Fiorentina (Italy)	Transfer	Pre-season	2019	Free	
20	GK	(Australia)	Danny Vukovic	31	Melbourne Victory	Transfer	Pre-season	2018	Free	
11	MF	(Australia)	Bernie Ibini	23	Club Brugge (Belgium)	Loan	Pre-season	2017	Free	
9	FW	(Brazil)	Bobô	31	Grêmio (Brazil)	Transfer	Pre-season	2017	Free	
3	DF	(Australia)	Riley Woodcock	21	Cockburn City	Transfer	Pre-season	2017	Free	
40	GK	(England)	Chris Oldfield	25	Avondale	Transfer	Mid-season	2016	Free	
1	GK	(Australia)	Andrew Redmayne	27	Western Sydney Wanderers	Transfer	Mid-season	2017	Free	
5	DF	(Netherlands)	Jordy Buijs	28		Transfer	Mid-season	2017	Free	

=== Transfers out ===
No.	Pos.	Nat.	Name	Age	Moving to	Type	Transfer window	Transfer fee	Source
19	DF	(Senegal)	Jacques Faty	32		Mutual Termination	Pre-season		
27	MF	(Senegal)	Mickaël Tavares	33		Mutual Termination	Pre-season		
22	MF	(Iraq)	Ali Abbas	29		Mutual Termination	Pre-season		
4	DF	(Australia)	Zac Anderson	25		End of Contract	Pre-season		
6	MF	(Australia)	Robert Stambolziev	25		End of Contract	Pre-season		
11	MF	(Australia)	Chris Naumoff	20		End of Contract	Pre-season		
12	DF	(Australia)	Jacob Tratt	21		End of Contract	Pre-season		
16	DF	(Australia)	Riley Woodcock	21		End of Contract	Pre-season		
20	GK	(Australia)	Ivan Necevski	36		End of Contract	Pre-season		
29	MF	(Australia)	Alex Mullen	23		End of Contract	Pre-season		
30	GK	(Australia)	Anthony Bouzanis	20		End of Contract	Pre-season		
7	MF	(Australia)	Andrew Hoole	22		Released	Pre-season		
9	FW	(New Zealand)	Shane Smeltz	34	Kedah (Malaysia)	Transfer	Pre-season		
1	GK	(Australia)	Vedran Janjetović	29	Western Sydney Wanderers	Transfer	Mid-season		
40	GK	(England)	Chris Oldfield	25		End of contract	Mid-season		
5	DF	(Australia)	Matthew Jurman	27	Suwon Samsung Bluewings (South Korea)	Transfer	Mid-season		
3	DF	(Australia)	Riley Woodcock	21		Released	Mid-season		

=== Contracts Extensions ===
Name	Position	Duration	Contract Expiry	Notes
(Australia) Matt Simon	Striker	1 year	2017	
(Australia) Alex Brosque	Striker	1 year	2017	
(Australia) Brandon O'Neill	Central midfielder	2 years	2019	
(Australia) Rhyan Grant	Right back	2 years	2019	
(Australia) Sebastian Ryall	Centre back	2 years	2019	

== Technical staff ==
Position	Name
Head coach	(Australia) Graham Arnold
Assistant coach	(Australia) Steve Corica
Goalkeeping coach	(Australia) John Crawley
Strength & conditioning coach	(Australia) Andrew Clark

== Statistics ==
=== Squad statistics ===
N	Pos.	Nat.	Name	Total					A-League					FFA Cup
N	Pos.	Nat.	Name	Apps	Goals	Yellow card	Second yellow card	Red card	Apps	Goals	Yellow card	Second yellow card	Red card	Apps	Goals	Yellow card	Second yellow card	Red card
1	GK	(Australia)	Andrew Redmayne	1	0	0	0	0	1+0	0	0	0	0	0+0	0	0	0	0
4	DF	(Australia)	Alex Wilkinson	32	0	4	0	0	29+0	0	3	0	0	2+1	0	1	0	0
5	DF	(Netherlands)	Jordy Buijs	12	1	1	0	0	12+0	1	1	0	0	0+0	0	0	0	0
6	MF	(Australia)	Joshua Brillante	31	2	10	1	0	25+1	2	10	1	0	5+0	0	0	0	0
7	DF	(Australia)	Michael Zullo	32	0	8	0	0	28+0	0	7	0	0	4+0	0	1	0	0
8	MF	(Serbia)	Miloš Dimitrijević	15	1	1	0	0	9+5	0	1	0	0	1+0	1	0	0	0
9	FW	(Brazil)	Bobô	33	16	1	0	0	28+1	15	1	0	0	3+1	1	0	0	0
10	MF	(Serbia)	Miloš Ninković	32	10	7	0	0	28+0	9	6	0	0	4+0	1	1	0	0
11	MF	(Australia)	Bernie Ibini	21	4	1	0	0	1+19	3	1	0	0	0+1	1	0	0	0
12	DF	(Australia)	Aaron Calver	6	0	1	0	0	5+1	0	1	0	0	0+0	0	0	0	0
13	MF	(Australia)	Brandon O'Neill	32	3	11	0	0	24+3	3	8	0	0	5+0	0	3	0	0
14	FW	(Australia)	Alex Brosque	32	12	6	1	0	24+4	11	6	1	0	2+2	1	0	0	0
16	DF	(Australia)	George Timotheou	0	0	0	0	0	0+0	0	0	0	0	0+0	0	0	0	0
17	MF	(Australia)	David Carney	27	5	5	0	0	7+15	3	4	0	0	4+1	2	1	0	0
18	FW	(Australia)	Matt Simon	30	2	6	0	0	0+25	0	5	0	0	2+3	2	1	0	0
19	FW	(Australia)	George Blackwood	3	0	0	0	0	1+1	0	0	0	0	1+0	0	0	0	0
20	GK	(Australia)	Danny Vukovic	33	0	1	0	0	28+0	0	1	0	0	5+0	0	0	0	0
21	FW	(Slovakia)	Filip Hološko	32	9	6	0	0	28+0	8	6	0	0	4+0	1	0	0	0
22	DF	(Australia)	Sebastian Ryall	15	1	0	0	0	4+6	0	0	0	0	5+0	1	0	0	0
23	MF	(Australia)	Rhyan Grant	32	3	7	0	0	27+0	3	7	0	0	5+0	0	0	0	0
24	FW	(Australia)	Charles Lokolingoy	1	0	0	0	0	0+0	0	0	0	0	0+1	0	0	0	0
25	DF	(Australia)	Patrick Flottman	0	0	0	0	0	0+0	0	0	0	0	0+0	0	0	0	0
28	MF	(North Macedonia)	Nicola Kuleski	1	0	0	0	0	0+1	0	0	0	0	0+0	0	0	0	0
29	FW	(Australia)	Bai Antoniou	1	0	0	0	0	0+0	0	0	0	0	0+1	0	0	0	0
30	GK	(Australia)	Mitch Evans	0	0	0	0	0	0+0	0	0	0	0	0+0	0	0	0	0
31	GK	(Australia)	Thomas Manos	0	0	0	0	0	0+0	0	0	0	0	0+0	0	0	0	0
Players no longer at the club:
1	GK	(Australia)	Vedran Janjetović	0	0	0	0	0	0+0	0	0	0	0	0+0	0	0	0	0
3	DF	(Australia)	Riley Woodcock	1	0	0	0	0	0+0	0	0	0	0	1+0	0	0	0	0
5	DF	(Australia)	Matthew Jurman	16	0	2	0	0	10+1	0	2	0	0	3+2	0	0	0	0
40	GK	(England)	Chris Oldfield	0	0	0	0	0	0+0	0	0	0	0	0+0	0	0	0	0

- Last updated: 7 May 2017
- Source: au.soccerway.com
- (yellow card) = Number of bookings; (second yellow card) = Number of sending offs after a second yellow card; (red card) = Number of sending offs by a direct red card.

== Preseason and friendlies ==
20 July 2016 Johnny Warren Community Challenge	Sydney FC (Australia)	12–0	(Australia) Earlwood Wanderers	Sydney, Australia
19:30 AEST	Hološko 5' (pen.), 14', 15', 19'; Dimitrijevic 25'; M. Gonzalez 49', 60', 75'; F. Zapata 53'; Cosherie 62'; Arditti 68'; Kuleski 75'	Report		Stadium: Leichhardt Oval; Attendance: 1,000; Referee: Steve Lucas

26 July 2016	Macarthur Rams (Australia)	1–0	(Australia) Sydney FC	Sydney, Australia
19:30 AEST	Versi 48'	Report		Stadium: Campbelltown Stadium; Referee: Ben Abraham

20 August 2016	Brisbane Roar (Australia)	1–2	(Australia) Sydney FC	Gold Coast, Australia
15:00 AEST	Maclaren 45'	Report	Simon 12'; Zullo 89'	Stadium: Cbus Super Stadium; Attendance: 0 (behind closed doors); Referee: Peter Green

7 September 2016	Melbourne Victory (Australia)	3–1	(Australia) Sydney FC	Melbourne, Australia
	Berisha 16' (pen.); Rojas 36'; Austin 69'	Report	O'Neill 19'	Stadium: AAMI Park; Attendance: 0 (behind closed doors)

29 September 2016	Sydney FC (Australia)	1–0	(Australia) Adelaide United	Sydney, Australia
15:00 AEST	Brillante 38'	Report		Stadium: Allianz Stadium; Attendance: 0 (behind closed doors)

24 May 2017	Sydney FC (Australia)	0–3	(England) Liverpool	Sydney, Australia
20:00 AEST		Report	Sturridge 7'; Moreno 17'; Firmino 38'	Stadium: ANZ Stadium; Attendance: 72,892; Referee: Peter Green

== Competitions ==
=== Overview ===
Competition	First match	Last match	Starting round	Final position	Record							
Competition	First match	Last match	Starting round	Final position	Pld	W	D	L	GF	GA	GD	Win %
A-League	8 October 2016	15 April 2017	Matchday 1	1st	27	20	6	1	55	12	+43	74.07
A-League Finals	29 April 2017	7 May 2017	Semi-finals	Winners	2	1	1	0	4	1	+3	50.00
FFA Cup	10 August 2016	30 November 2016	Round of 32	Runners-up	5	4	0	1	11	1	+10	80.00
Total					34	25	7	2	70	14	+56	73.53

Source: Competitions

=== A-League ===
==== League table ====
Pos	Team	Pld	W	D	L	GF	GA	GD	Pts	Qualification
1	Sydney FC (C)	27	20	6	1	55	12	+43	66	Qualification for 2018 AFC Champions League group stage and Finals series
2	Melbourne Victory	27	15	4	8	49	31	+18	49	Qualification for 2018 AFC Champions League group stage and Finals series
3	Brisbane Roar	27	11	9	7	43	37	+6	42	Qualification for 2018 AFC Champions League second preliminary round and Finals series
4	Melbourne City	27	11	6	10	49	44	+5	39	Qualification for Finals series
5	Perth Glory	27	10	9	8	53	53	0	39	Qualification for Finals series
6	Western Sydney Wanderers	27	8	12	7	35	35	0	36	Qualification for Finals series
7	Wellington Phoenix (Note: Wellington Phoenix cannot qualify for the AFC Champions League as they are not recognised as an AFC club.)	27	8	6	13	41	46	−5	30	
8	Central Coast Mariners	27	6	5	16	31	52	−21	23	
9	Adelaide United	27	5	8	14	25	46	−21	23	
10	Newcastle Jets	27	5	7	15	28	53	−25	22	

Source: A-Leagues
Rules for classification: 1) points; 2) goal difference; 3) number of goals scored.
(C) Champions

==== Results summary ====
Overall								Home						Away					
Pld	W	D	L	GF	GA	GD	Pts	W	D	L	GF	GA	GD	W	D	L	GF	GA	GD
27	20	6	1	55	12	+43	66	10	3	0	25	4	+21	10	3	1	30	8	+22

Last updated: 15 April 2017.
Source: ultimatealeague.com

==== Results by round ====
Round	1	2	3	4	5	6	7	8	9	10	11	12	13	14	15	16	17	18	19	20	21	22	23	24	25	26	27
Ground	A	H	A	A	H	H	A	H	A	H	A	A	H	A	H	H	A	A	H	A	A	H	H	A	H	A	H
Result	W	W	W	W	W	W	D	D	W	D	W	W	W	W	D	W	W	D	W	L	W	W	W	W	W	D	W
Position	1	1	1	1	1	1	1	1	1	1	1	1	1	1	1	1	1	1	1	1	1	1	1	1	1	1	1

Source: ultimatealeague.com
A = Away; H = Home; W = Win; D = Draw; L = Loss

==== Matches ====
8 October 2016 1	Western Sydney Wanderers	0–4	Sydney FC	Sydney
19:50 AEDT		Report	Hološko 51'; Bobô 55'; O'Neill 85'; Brosque 89'	Stadium: ANZ Stadium; Attendance: 61,880; Referee: Jarred Gillett

15 October 2016 2	Sydney FC	4–0	Central Coast Mariners	Sydney
17:35 AEDT	Hološko 18', 65' (pen.); Bobô 38'; Brosque 70'	Report		Stadium: Allianz Stadium; Attendance: 15,082; Referee: Stephen Lucas

23 October 2016 3	Wellington Phoenix	0–1	Sydney FC	Wellington
19:00 NZDT		Report	Ninković 90+2'	Stadium: Westpac Stadium; Attendance: 7,365; Referee: Kurt Ams

29 October 2016 4	Newcastle Jets	0–2	Sydney FC	Newcastle
17:35 AEDT		Report	Brosque 8'; Ninković 49'	Stadium: McDonald Jones Stadium; Attendance: 11,873; Referee: Daniel Elder

5 November 2016 5	Sydney FC	2–1	Melbourne Victory	Sydney
19:50 AEDT	Carney 63', 78'	Report	Austin 41'	Stadium: Allianz Stadium; Attendance: 19,143; Referee: Chris Beath

13 November 2016 6	Sydney FC	4–1	Perth Glory	Sydney
17:00 AEDT	Ninković 14', 79'; Bobô 38'; Brosque 88'	Report	R. Grant 62' (o.g.)	Stadium: Allianz Stadium; Attendance: 14,167; Referee: Peter Green

19 November 2016 7	Brisbane Roar	1–1	Sydney FC	Brisbane
18:50 AEST	Kristensen 40'	Report	Brillante 14'	Stadium: Suncorp Stadium; Attendance: 17,322; Referee: Alan Milliner

26 November 2016 8	Sydney FC	0–0	Adelaide United	Sydney
19:50 AEDT		Report		Stadium: Allianz Stadium; Attendance: 13,179; Referee: Kris Griffiths-Jones

4 December 2016 9	Newcastle Jets	0–2	Sydney FC	Newcastle
17:00 AEDT		Report	Ninković 63'; Ibini 79'	Stadium: McDonald Jones Stadium; Attendance: 8,473; Referee: Adam Fielding

9 December 2016 10	Sydney FC	1–1	Melbourne City	Sydney
19:50 AEDT	Bobô 80' (pen.)	Report	Brandán 32'	Stadium: ANZ Stadium; Attendance: 14,668; Referee: Kris Griffiths-Jones

17 December 2016 11	Perth Glory	1–4	Sydney FC	Perth
19:00 AWST	Taggart 20'	Report	Brosque 21'; Hološko 61'; Bobô 71'; Ibini 90+1' (pen.)	Stadium: nib Stadium; Attendance: 9,119; Referee: Alan Milliner

26 December 2016 12	Adelaide United	0–4	Sydney FC	Adelaide
19:20 ACDT		Report	Hološko 34'; Brosque 53', 66'; R. Grant 64'	Stadium: Coopers Stadium; Attendance: 11,805; Referee: Chris Beath

30 December 2016 13	Sydney FC	2–0	Brisbane Roar	Sydney
19:50 AEDT	Brosque 36'; Ninković 63'	Report		Stadium: Allianz Stadium; Attendance: 16,510; Referee: Shaun Evans

8 January 2017 14	Central Coast Mariners	2–3	Sydney FC	Gosford
17:00 AEDT	O'Donovan 66'; Galloway 76'	Report	Bobô 43', 48'; Carney 77'	Stadium: Central Coast Stadium; Attendance: 11,398; Referee: Chris Beath

14 January 2017 15	Sydney FC	0–0	Western Sydney Wanderers	Sydney
19:50 AEDT		Report		Stadium: Allianz Stadium; Attendance: 40,143; Referee: Peter Green

20 January 2017 16	Sydney FC	2–0	Adelaide United	Sydney
19:50 AEDT	Brosque 58'; Ninković 60'	Report		Stadium: Allianz Stadium; Attendance: 11,225; Referee: Shaun Evans

26 January 2017 17	Melbourne Victory	1–2	Sydney FC	Melbourne
19:50 AEDT	Troisi 18'	Report	Hološko 38'; Ibini 65'	Stadium: Etihad Stadium; Attendance: 30,262; Referee: Jarred Gillett

3 February 2017 18	Brisbane Roar	0–0	Sydney FC	Brisbane
18:50 AEST		Report		Stadium: Suncorp Stadium; Attendance: 13,095; Referee: Peter Green

9 February 2017 19	Sydney FC	3–1	Wellington Phoenix	Sydney
19:50 AEDT	R. Grant 3'; Bobô 22'; Ninković 54'	Report	Rodriguez 32'	Stadium: Allianz Stadium; Attendance: 8,380; Referee: Kurt Ams

18 February 2017 20	Western Sydney Wanderers	1–0	Sydney FC	Sydney
19:50 AEDT	Santalab 26'	Report		Stadium: ANZ Stadium; Attendance: 44,843; Referee: Chris Beath

24 February 2017 21	Melbourne City	1–3	Sydney FC	Melbourne
19:50 AEDT	Fitzgerald 25'	Report	Bobô 24' (pen.), 67'; O'Neill 56'	Stadium: AAMI Park; Attendance: 10,706; Referee: Jarred Gillett

3 March 2017 22	Sydney FC	1–0	Melbourne Victory	Sydney
19:50 AEDT	Bobô 50'	Report		Stadium: Allianz Stadium; Attendance: 13,310; Referee: Peter Green

10 March 2017 23	Sydney FC	1–0	Central Coast Mariners	Sydney
19:50 AEDT	Hološko 8'	Report		Stadium: Allianz Stadium; Attendance: 11,148; Referee: Shaun Evans

26 March 2017 24	Perth Glory	0–3	Sydney FC	Perth
16:00 AWST		Report	Goian 38' (o.g.); O'Neill 41'; Bobô 62'	Stadium: nib Stadium; Attendance: 10,097; Referee: Kris Griffiths-Jones

1 April 2017 25	Sydney FC	3–0	Melbourne City	Sydney
19:50 AEDT	Brosque 57'; Bobô 64', 90+1'	Report		Stadium: Allianz Stadium; Attendance: 15,266; Referee: Peter Green

8 April 2017 26	Wellington Phoenix	1–1	Sydney FC	Wellington
19:45 NZST	McGlinchey 90+3'	Report	Bobô 72' (pen.)	Stadium: Westpac Stadium; Attendance: 6,610; Referee: Shaun Evans

15 April 2017 27	Sydney FC	2–0	Newcastle Jets	Sydney
17:35 AEST	Ninković 56'; Brosque 87'	Report		Stadium: Allianz Stadium; Attendance: 15,787; Referee: Shaun Evans

==== Finals series ====
29 April 2017 Semi-final	Sydney FC	3–0	Perth Glory	Sydney
19:50 AEST	Brillante 21'; Buijs 37'; Hološko 45+1'	Report		Stadium: Allianz Stadium; Attendance: 21,938; Referee: Peter Green

7 May 2017 Grand Final	Sydney FC	1–1 (a.e.t.) (4–2 p)	Melbourne Victory	Sydney
17:00 AEST	Grant 69'	Report	Berisha 20'	Stadium: Allianz Stadium; Attendance: 41,546; Referee: Jarred Gillett
	Penalties
	Brosque (penalty scored); Wilkinson (penalty missed); Carney (penalty scored); O'Neill (penalty scored); Ninković (penalty scored)		(penalty scored) Troisi; (penalty scored) Broxham; (penalty missed) Valeri; (penalty missed) Rojas

=== FFA Cup ===
10 August 2016 Round of 32	Wollongong Wolves (New South Wales)	0–3	(New South Wales) Sydney FC	Wollongong
19:30 AEST		Report	Simon 67', 71'; Carney 90+1'	Stadium: WIN Stadium; Attendance: 8,029; Referee: Kurt Ams

30 August 2016 Round of 16	Perth Glory (Western Australia)	0–2 (a.e.t.)	(New South Wales) Sydney FC	Perth
18:30 AWST		Report	Ninković 98'; Brosque 113'	Stadium: Dorrien Gardens; Attendance: 2,661; Referee: Adam Fielding

21 September 2016 Quarter-final	Blacktown City (New South Wales)	0–3	(New South Wales) Sydney FC	Sydney
19:30 AEST		Report	Hološko 13'; Carney 26'; Bobô 78'	Stadium: Sydney United Sports Centre; Attendance: 3,764; Referee: Peter Green

19 October 2016 Semi-final	Canberra Olympic (Australian Capital Territory)	0–3	(New South Wales) Sydney FC	Canberra
19:30 AEDT		Report	Ryall 24'; Dimitrijević 65'; Ibini 82'	Stadium: Viking Park; Attendance: 5,581; Referee: Chris Beath

30 November 2016 Final	Melbourne City (Victoria (state))	1–0	(New South Wales) Sydney FC	Melbourne
19:30 AEDT	Cahill 52'	Report		Stadium: AAMI Park; Attendance: 18,751; Referee: Peter Green

== End-of-season awards ==
On May 13, 2017, Sydney FC hosted their annual Sky Blue Ball and presented eight awards on the night.

Award	Men's	Women's	Youth
Player of the Year	Milos Ninkovic	Remy Siemsen	Andreas Agamemnonos
Player's Player of the Year	Milos Ninkovic	N/A	
Member's Player of the Year	Milos Ninkovic	N/A	
Golden Boot	Bobô	Remy Siemsen	N/A
Chairman's Award	Andrew Clark (Head Strength and Conditioning Coach)		
