= 2016–17 A-League =

40th season of top-tier soccer league in Australia

A-League
- Season: 2016–17
- Champions: Sydney FC (3rd title)
- Premiers: Sydney FC (2nd title)
- Champions League: Sydney FC; Melbourne Victory; Brisbane Roar
- Matches: 135
- Goals: 409 (3.03 per match)
- Top goalscorer: Besart Berisha; Jamie Maclaren (19 goals)
- Best goalkeeper: Danny Vukovic
- Biggest home win: Melbourne Victory 6–1 Wellington Phoenix (31 October 2016); Wellington Phoenix 5–0 Newcastle Jets (26 March 2017)
- Biggest away win: Adelaide United 0–5 Perth Glory (10 February 2017)
- Highest scoring: Perth Glory 5–4 Melbourne City (16 April 2017)
- Longest winning run: Melbourne Victory; Sydney FC (6 games)
- Longest unbeaten run: Sydney FC (19 games)
- Longest winless run: Newcastle Jets (10 games)
- Longest losing run: Newcastle Jets (6 games)
- Highest attendance: 61,880; Western Sydney Wanderers 0–4 Sydney FC (8 October 2016)
- Lowest attendance: 4,828; Wellington Phoenix 5–0 Newcastle Jets (26 March 2017)
- Average attendance: 12,294 ( 15)

The 2016–17 A-League was the 40th season of top-flight soccer in Australia, and the 12th since the establishment of the A-League in 2004. The season began on 7 October 2016.

Adelaide United were both the defending A-League Premiers and Champions. The 2017 Grand Final took place on 7 May 2017, with Sydney FC claiming their third Championship with a 1–1 (4–2 on penalties) win against Melbourne Victory. Sydney FC also claimed the premiership for the 2016–17 regular season, their second in club history.

== Clubs ==
Team	City	Home Ground	Capacity
Adelaide United	Adelaide	Coopers Stadium	17,000
Brisbane Roar	Brisbane	Suncorp Stadium	52,500
Central Coast Mariners	Gosford	Central Coast Stadium	20,119
Melbourne City	Melbourne	AAMI Park	30,050
Melbourne Victory	Melbourne	Etihad Stadium	56,347
Melbourne Victory	Melbourne	AAMI Park	30,050
Newcastle Jets	Newcastle	McDonald Jones Stadium	33,000
Perth Glory	Perth	nib Stadium	20,500
Sydney FC	Sydney	Allianz Stadium	45,500
Wellington Phoenix	Wellington	Westpac Stadium	34,500
Western Sydney Wanderers	Sydney	ANZ Stadium	84,000
Western Sydney Wanderers	Sydney	Spotless Stadium	24,000

=== Personnel and kits ===
Team	Manager	Captain	Kit manufacturer	Kit partner
Adelaide United	(Spain) Guillermo Amor	(Australia) Eugene Galekovic	Macron	IGA
Brisbane Roar	(Australia) John Aloisi	(Australia) Matt McKay	Umbro	Steadfast
Central Coast Mariners	(Australia) Paul Okon	(Scotland) Nick Montgomery	Umbro	Masterfoods
Melbourne City	(Australia) Michael Valkanis	(Uruguay) Bruno Fornaroli	Nike	Etihad
Melbourne Victory	(Australia) Kevin Muscat	(Australia) Carl Valeri	Adidas	Optislim
Newcastle Jets	(Australia) Mark Jones	(Australia) Nigel Boogaard	BLK	Ledman
Perth Glory	(England) Kenny Lowe	(Australia) Rostyn Griffiths	Macron	QBE
Sydney FC	(Australia) Graham Arnold	(Australia) Alex Brosque	Puma	Webjet
Wellington Phoenix	(England) Des Buckingham	(New Zealand) Andrew Durante	Adidas	Huawei
Western Sydney Wanderers	(Australia) Tony Popovic	(Spain) Dimas	Nike	NRMA Insurance

=== Managerial changes ===
Team	Outgoing manager	Manner of departure	Date of vacancy	Position on table	Incoming manager	Date of appointment
Central Coast Mariners	(England) Tony Walmsley	Sacked	8 August 2016	Pre-season	(Australia) Paul Okon	29 August 2016
Newcastle Jets	(Australia) Scott Miller	Sacked	7 September 2016	Pre-season	(Australia) Mark Jones	23 September 2016
Wellington Phoenix	(Scotland) Ernie Merrick	Resigned	5 December 2016	10th	(England) Des Buckingham (Note: Buckingham was initially named as interim head coach, before being appointed on a permanent basis on 2 January 2017.)	5 December 2016
Melbourne City	(Netherlands) John van 't Schip	Resigned	3 January 2017	4th	(Australia) Michael Valkanis (Note: Valkanis was initially named as interim head coach, before being appointed on a permanent basis on 25 January 2017.)	3 January 2017

=== Foreign players ===
Club	Visa 1	Visa 2	Visa 3	Visa 4	Visa 5	Non-Visa foreigner(s)	Former player(s)
Adelaide United	(Argentina) Marcelo Carrusca	(Senegal) Baba Diawara	(Spain) Sergio Cirio	(Spain) Isaías	(South Korea) Kim Jae-sung	(Italy) Iacopo La Rocca^{1}	(Brazil) Henrique^{1} (South Korea) Danny Choi^{3} (Spain) Sergi Guardiola
Brisbane Roar	(Denmark) Thomas Kristensen	(Germany) Thomas Broich	(Spain) Manuel Arana			(England) Jamie Young^{2} (Greece) Avraam Papadopoulos^{2} (New Zealand) Dane Ingham^{2} (Sri Lanka) Jack Hingert^{2}	
Central Coast Mariners	(Republic of Ireland) Roy O'Donovan	(Portugal) Fábio Ferreira	(Senegal) Jacques Faty	(Senegal) Mickaël Tavares		(Scotland) Nick Montgomery^{1} (New Zealand) Kwabena Appiah^{2} (New Zealand) Storm Roux^{2}	(Papua New Guinea) Brad McDonald^{2}
Melbourne City	(Argentina) Fernando Brandán	(Argentina) Nicolás Colazo	(Denmark) Michael Jakobsen	(Denmark) Thomas Sørensen	(Uruguay) Bruno Fornaroli	(Malta) Manny Muscat^{2}	
Melbourne Victory	(Kosovo) Besart Berisha	(New Zealand) Marco Rojas	(Spain) Alan Baró	(Tunisia) Fahid Ben Khalfallah		(North Macedonia) Daniel Georgievski^{2} (New Zealand) Jai Ingham^{2}	(Germany) Maximilian Beister
Newcastle Jets	(China) Ma Leilei	(Croatia) Mateo Poljak	(Denmark) Morten Nordstrand	(England) Wayne Brown	(Finland) Aleksandr Kokko	(Croatia) Ivan Vujica^{2}	
Perth Glory	(England) Joseph Mills	(Republic of Ireland) Andy Keogh	(Romania) Lucian Goian	(Serbia) Nebojša Marinković	(Spain) Diego Castro		(Serbia) Milan Smiljanić
Sydney FC	(Brazil) Bobô	(Netherlands) Jordy Buijs	(Serbia) Miloš Dimitrijević	(Serbia) Miloš Ninković	(Slovakia) Filip Hološko	(North Macedonia) Nicola Kuleski^{2}	
Wellington Phoenix	(Brazil) Guilherme Finkler	(Curaçao) Roly Bonevacia	(Fiji) Roy Krishna	(Italy) Marco Rossi	(Spain) Alex Rodriguez		
Western Sydney Wanderers	(Argentina) Nicolás Martínez	(Japan) Jumpei Kusukami	(Spain) Aritz Borda	(Spain) Dimas	(Uruguay) Bruno Piñatares		

The following do not fill a Visa position:
^{1}Those players who were born and started their professional career abroad but have since gained Australian citizenship (and New Zealand citizenship, in the case of Wellington Phoenix);
^{2}Australian citizens (and New Zealand citizens, in the case of Wellington Phoenix) who have chosen to represent another national team;
^{3}Injury Replacement Players, or National Team Replacement Players;
^{4}Guest Players (eligible to play a maximum of fourteen games)

=== Salary cap exemptions and captains ===
Club	First Marquee	Second Marquee	Guest Marquee	Mature Age Rookie	Captain	Vice-Captain
Adelaide United	(Australia) Eugene Galekovic	(Argentina) Marcelo Carrusca	None	None	(Australia) Eugene Galekovic	(Argentina) Marcelo Carrusca
Brisbane Roar	(Australia) Matt McKay	(Germany) Thomas Broich	None	None	(Australia) Matt McKay	(Australia) Jade North
Central Coast Mariners	None	None	None	None	(Scotland) Nick Montgomery	None
Melbourne City	(Uruguay) Bruno Fornaroli	(Argentina) Nicolás Colazo	(Australia) Tim Cahill	None	(Uruguay) Bruno Fornaroli	None
Melbourne Victory	(Australia) Oliver Bozanic (Note: Bozanic transferred out of Melbourne Victory and his marquee deal part-way through on 16 March 2017.)	(Kosovo) Besart Berisha	None	None	(Australia) Carl Valeri	(Australia) Leigh Broxham
Newcastle Jets	None	None	None	(Australia) Joel Allwright	(Australia) Nigel Boogaard	(Croatia) Mateo Poljak
Perth Glory	(Spain) Diego Castro	None	None	None	(Australia) Rostyn Griffiths	(Republic of Ireland) Andy Keogh
Sydney FC	(Slovakia) Filip Hološko	(Brazil) Bobô	None	None	(Australia) Alex Brosque	(Australia) Alex Wilkinson
Wellington Phoenix	(New Zealand) Kosta Barbarouses	(Brazil) Guilherme Finkler	None	None	(New Zealand) Andrew Durante	None
Western Sydney Wanderers	(Argentina) Nicolás Martínez	None	None	None	(Spain) Dimas	(Australia) Mitch Nichols

== Regular season ==
=== League table ===
Pos	Team	Pld	W	D	L	GF	GA	GD	Pts	Qualification
1	Sydney FC (C)	27	20	6	1	55	12	+43	66	Qualification for 2018 AFC Champions League group stage and Finals series
2	Melbourne Victory	27	15	4	8	49	31	+18	49	Qualification for 2018 AFC Champions League group stage and Finals series
3	Brisbane Roar	27	11	9	7	43	37	+6	42	Qualification for 2018 AFC Champions League second preliminary round and Finals series
4	Melbourne City	27	11	6	10	49	44	+5	39	Qualification for Finals series
5	Perth Glory	27	10	9	8	53	53	0	39	Qualification for Finals series
6	Western Sydney Wanderers	27	8	12	7	35	35	0	36	Qualification for Finals series
7	Wellington Phoenix (Note: Wellington Phoenix cannot qualify for the AFC Champions League as they are not recognised as an AFC club.)	27	8	6	13	41	46	−5	30	
8	Central Coast Mariners	27	6	5	16	31	52	−21	23	
9	Adelaide United	27	5	8	14	25	46	−21	23	
10	Newcastle Jets	27	5	7	15	28	53	−25	22	

Source: A-Leagues
Rules for classification: 1) points; 2) goal difference; 3) number of goals scored.
(C) Champions

=== Results ===
Home \ Away	ADE	BRI	CCM	MBC	MVC	NEW	PER	SYD	WEL	WSW	ADE	BRI	CCM	MBC	MVC	NEW	PER	SYD	WEL	WSW
Adelaide United		1–1	1–2	2–1	1–2	1–0	0–5	0–4	2–0	1–2		2–1			0–2		1–1		2–2	2–2
Brisbane Roar	4–0		5–1	1–0	1–1	2–3	2–1	1–1	1–2	1–1					1–0			0–0	4–3	2–1
Central Coast Mariners	2–1	0–1		2–2	0–3	2–0	2–0	2–3	0–2	1–4	2–3	1–2		2–3			2–0			
Melbourne City	2–1	1–1	2–1		1–2	2–1	2–3	1–3	2–1	1–0	1–0	2–2				4–0	3–3			
Melbourne Victory	2–1	3–2	4–1	1–4		2–0	1–1	1–2	6–1	3–0			1–0	2–1		4–2	4–1		0–3	
Newcastle Jets	1–1	4–0	1–1	2–1	0–0		2–2	0–2	2–2	0–3	2–1	1–3	1–1					0–2		
Perth Glory	3–1	2–2	3–3	5–4	2–1	1–2		1–4	2–0	2–2		3–1				3–2		0–3	2–1	2–0
Sydney FC	0–0	2–0	4–0	1–1	2–1	2–0	4–1		3–1	0–0	2–0		1–0	3–0	1–0					
Wellington Phoenix	0–0	0–1	3–0	0–1	3–0	2–0	3–3	0–1		2–2			1–0	1–5		5–0		1–1		1–3
Western Sydney Wanderers	0–0	1–1	1–1	1–1	0–3	2–2	1–1	0–4	3–1				0–2	3–1	0–0	2–0		1–0		

Updated to match(es) played on 16 April 2017. Source: a-league.com.au
Legend: Blue = home team win; Yellow = draw; Red = away team win.

== Finals series ==
Elimination-finals
Melbourne City	0
Perth Glory	2
Brisbane Roar (p)	1 (6)
Western Sydney Wanderers	1 (5)

Semi-finals
Sydney FC	3
Perth Glory	0
Melbourne Victory	1
Brisbane Roar	0

Grand Final
Sydney FC (p)	1 (4)
Melbourne Victory	1 (2)

=== Elimination-finals ===
21 April 2017
19:50 AEST

Brisbane Roar	1–1 (a.e.t.)	Western Sydney Wanderers
Maclaren 55'	Report	Antonis 45+1' (pen.)
Penalties
Borrello (penalty scored); D'Agostino (penalty scored); Maclaren (penalty scored); DeVere (penalty scored); Kristensen (penalty scored); Oar (penalty scored)	6–5	(penalty scored) Antonis; (penalty scored) Dimas; (penalty scored) N. Martínez; (penalty scored) Hamill; (penalty scored) Cornthwaite; (penalty missed) Kusukami

Suncorp Stadium, Brisbane
Attendance: 17,530
Referee: Jarred Gillett

23 April 2017
19:00 AEST

Melbourne City	0–2	Perth Glory
	Report	Castro 16'; Chianese 30'

AAMI Park, Melbourne
Attendance: 9,944
Referee: Chris Beath

=== Semi-finals ===
29 April 2017
19:50 AEST

Sydney FC	3–0	Perth Glory
Brillante 21'; Buijs 37'; Hološko 45+1'	Report

Allianz Stadium, Sydney
Attendance: 21,938
Referee: Peter Green

30 April 2017
17:00 AEST

Melbourne Victory	1–0	Brisbane Roar
Berisha 70'	Report

AAMI Park, Melbourne
Attendance: 20,202
Referee: Kris Griffiths-Jones

=== Grand Final ===
7 May 2017
17:00 AEST

Sydney FC	1–1 (a.e.t.)	Melbourne Victory
Grant 69'	Report	Berisha 20'
Penalties
Brosque (penalty scored); Wilkinson (penalty missed); Carney (penalty scored); O'Neill (penalty scored); Ninković (penalty scored)	4–2	(penalty scored) Troisi; (penalty scored) Broxham; (penalty missed) Valeri; (penalty missed) Rojas

Allianz Stadium, Sydney
Attendance: 41,546
Referee: Jarred Gillett

== Statistics ==
=== Attendances ===
==== By club ====
These are the attendance records of each of the teams at the end of the home and away season. The table does not include finals series attendances.

As of matches played on 16 April 2017.

Team	Hosted	Average	High	Low	Total
Melbourne Victory	14	22,008	43,188	14,081	308,115
Western Sydney Wanderers	14	17,746	61,880	7,828	248,442
Sydney FC	13	16,001	40,143	8,380	208,008
Brisbane Roar	13	13,892	20,198	8,113	180,601
Melbourne City	13	10,593	24,706	7,745	137,709
Perth Glory	14	10,533	13,290	8,834	147,459
Adelaide United	14	9,565	14,908	6,642	133,905
Newcastle Jets	13	8,645	11,873	5,642	112,380
Central Coast Mariners	13	7,395	11,398	5,072	96,141
Wellington Phoenix	14	6,211	10,034	4,828	86,949
League total	135	12,294	61,880	4,828	1,659,709

==== By round ====
2016–17 A-League Attendance
Round	Total	Games	Avg. Per Game
Round 1	106,365	5	21,273
Round 2	92,603	5	18,521
Round 3	50,669	5	10,134
Round 4	67,635	5	13,527
Round 5	69,437	5	13,887
Round 6	58,035	5	11,607
Round 7	58,488	5	11,698
Round 8	58,367	5	11,673
Round 9	52,498	5	10,500
Round 10	60,940	5	12,188
Round 11	51,232	5	10,246
Round 12	65,126	5	13,025
Round 13	59,526	5	11,905
Round 14	55,845	5	11,169
Round 15	87,088	5	17,418
Round 16	47,206	5	9,441
Round 17	66,960	5	13,392
Round 18	71,681	5	14,336
Round 19	38,651	5	7,730
Round 20	75,391	5	15,078
Round 21	59,676	5	11,935
Round 22	41,656	5	8,331
Round 23	51,936	5	10,387
Round 24	44,143	5	8,829
Round 25	57,077	5	11,415
Round 26	49,300	5	9,860
Round 27	62,609	5	12,522
Elimination Final	27,474	2	13,737
Semi Final	42,140	2	21,070
Grand Final	41,546	1	41,546

=== Club membership ===
2016–17 A-League membership figures
Club	Members
Adelaide United	10,099
Brisbane Roar	7,050
Central Coast Mariners	6,265
Melbourne City	13,078
Melbourne Victory	26,251
Newcastle Jets	8,703
Perth Glory	8,644
Sydney FC	12,512
Wellington Phoenix	4,791
Western Sydney Wanderers	20,022
Total	117,415
Average	11,741

Last updated: 16 April 2017.
Source: a-league.com.au

=== Player stats ===
==== Top scorers ====
As of matches played on 16 April 2017

Rank	Player	Club	Goals
1	(Kosovo) Besart Berisha	Melbourne Victory	19
1	(Australia) Jamie Maclaren	Brisbane Roar	19
3	(Uruguay) Bruno Fornaroli	Melbourne City	17
4	(Brazil) Bobô	Sydney FC	15
5	(Australia) Brendon Santalab	Western Sydney Wanderers	14
6	(Spain) Diego Castro	Perth Glory	12
6	(Republic of Ireland) Andy Keogh	Perth Glory	12
6	(Fiji) Roy Krishna	Wellington Phoenix	12
6	(New Zealand) Marco Rojas	Melbourne Victory	12
6	(Australia) Adam Taggart	Perth Glory	12

==== Hat-tricks ====
Player	For	Against	Result	Date	Ref
(Republic of Ireland) Andy Keogh	Perth Glory	Melbourne City	3–2	21 October 2016	
(Albania) Besart Berisha^{†}	Melbourne Victory	Wellington Phoenix	6–1	31 October 2016	
(Albania) Besart Berisha^{†}	Melbourne Victory	Western Sydney Wanderers	3–0	10 December 2016	
(Australia) Brendon Santalab	Western Sydney Wanderers	Melbourne City	3–1	24 March 2017	
(Australia) Jamie Maclaren	Brisbane Roar	Central Coast Mariners	5–1	2 April 2017	

† - On 24 March 2017 Besart Berisha switched nationalities from Albania to Kosovo.

==== Own goals ====
As of matches played on 16 April 2017

Player	Club	Against	Round
(Australia) Liam Reddy	Perth Glory	Central Coast Mariners	1
(Australia) Jack Hingert	Brisbane Roar	Newcastle Jets	2
(Australia) Rhyan Grant	Sydney FC	Perth Glory	6
(Australia) Neil Kilkenny	Melbourne City	Western Sydney Wanderers	7
(Australia) Josh Risdon	Perth Glory	Adelaide United	7
(Australia) Iain Fyfe	Newcastle Jets	Melbourne Victory	8
(Australia) Jake McGing	Central Coast Mariners	Western Sydney Wanderers	9
(Serbia) Milan Smiljanić	Perth Glory	Newcastle Jets	10
(Australia) Jake McGing	Central Coast Mariners	Melbourne Victory	12
(Australia) Carl Valeri	Melbourne Victory	Newcastle Jets	13
(Australia) James Donachie	Melbourne Victory	Brisbane Roar	15
(Spain) Alan Baró	Melbourne Victory	Melbourne City	18
(Malta) Manny Muscat	Melbourne City	Melbourne Victory	18
(Italy) Iacopo La Rocca	Adelaide United	Perth Glory	19
(Australia) Ryan Lowry	Wellington Phoenix	Melbourne City	20
(Scotland) Nick Montgomery	Central Coast Mariners	Melbourne City	22
(Australia) Ruon Tongyik	Melbourne City	Central Coast Mariners	22
(Australia) Jason Hoffman	Newcastle Jets	Wellington Phoenix	24
(Romania) Lucian Goian	Perth Glory	Sydney FC	24

==== Clean sheets ====
As of matches played on 16 April 2017

Rank	Player	Club	Clean sheets
1	(Australia) Danny Vukovic	Sydney FC	15
2	(Australia) Lawrence Thomas	Melbourne Victory	7
3	(Australia) Vedran Janjetović	Western Sydney Wanderers	6
4	(New Zealand) Glen Moss	Wellington Phoenix	5
5	(Australia) Paul Izzo	Central Coast Mariners	4
5	(Australia) Michael Theo	Brisbane Roar	4
7	(Australia) Eugene Galekovic	Adelaide United	3
7	(Australia) Lewis Italiano	Wellington Phoenix	3
7	(Australia) Liam Reddy	Perth Glory	3
10	(Australia) Dean Bouzanis	Melbourne City	2
10	(Australia) Jack Duncan	Newcastle Jets	2
10	(England) Jamie Young	Brisbane Roar	2

NB - An additional clean sheet was kept by Melbourne City, however this is not listed due to a goalkeeper substitution.

=== Discipline ===
During the season each club is given fair play points based on the number of cards they received in games. A yellow card is worth 1 point, a second yellow card is worth 2 points, and a red card is worth 3 points. At the annual awards night, the club with the fewest points wins the Fair Play Award.

Club	Yellow card	Second yellow card	Red card	FP Pts
Central Coast Mariners	44	1	2	52
Adelaide United	52	2	0	56
Brisbane Roar	51	1	1	56
Newcastle Jets	55	1	0	57
Melbourne Victory	56	1	2	64
Sydney FC	64	2	0	68
Wellington Phoenix	62	2	1	69
Western Sydney Wanderers	58	1	4	72
Perth Glory	67	1	2	75
Melbourne City	73	1	3	84
League total	582	13	15	

Last updated: 16 April 2017.
Source: ultimatealeague.com

== End-of-season awards ==
The following end of the season awards were announced at the 2016–17 Dolan Warren Awards night held at the Star Event Centre in Sydney on 1 May 2017.

- Johnny Warren Medal – Miloš Ninković, Sydney FC
- NAB Young Footballer of the Year – Jamie Maclaren, Brisbane Roar
- Nike Golden Boot Award – Besart Berisha, Melbourne Victory & Jamie Maclaren, Brisbane Roar (19 goals each)
- Goalkeeper of the Year – Danny Vukovic, Sydney FC
- Coach of the Year – Graham Arnold, Sydney FC
- Fair Play Award – Central Coast Mariners
- Referee of the Year – Jarred Gillett
- Goal of the Year – Tim Cahill, Melbourne City (Melbourne Victory v Melbourne City, 15 October 2016)

== See also ==
- 2016–17 Adelaide United FC season
- 2016–17 Brisbane Roar FC season
- 2016–17 Central Coast Mariners FC season
- 2016–17 Melbourne City FC season
- 2016–17 Melbourne Victory FC season
- 2016–17 Newcastle Jets FC season
- 2016–17 Perth Glory FC season
- 2016–17 Sydney FC season
- 2016–17 Wellington Phoenix FC season
- 2016–17 Western Sydney Wanderers FC season
