= Joshua Brillante =

Australian football player (born 1993)

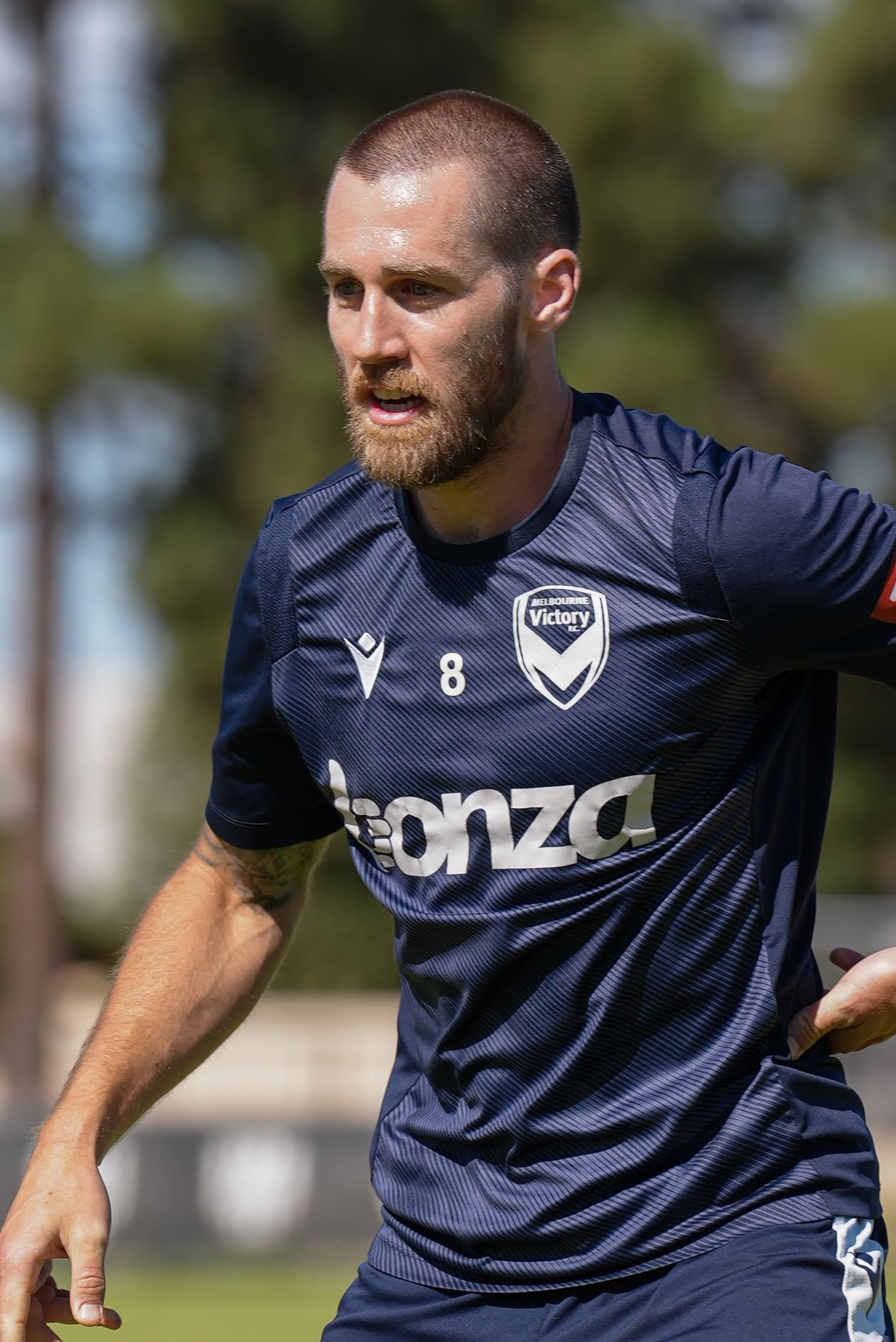

Personal information
- Full name: Joshua Brillante
- Date of birth: 25 March 1993 (age 33)
- Place of birth: Bundaberg, Australia
- Height: 1.77 m (5 ft 10 in)
- Position: Defensive midfielder

Team information
- Current team: Bankstown City
- Number: 6

Youth career
- Bundaberg Waves
- 2006: Bundaberg Spirit
- 2007–2009: QAS
- 2009–2011: Gold Coast United

Senior career*
Years	Team	Apps	(Gls)
2010–2012	Gold Coast United	14	(0)
2012–2014	Newcastle Jets	46	(0)
2014–2016	Fiorentina	2	(0)
2015	→ Empoli (loan)	1	(0)
2015–2016	→ Como (loan)	21	(0)
2016–2019	Sydney FC	79	(3)
2019–2020	Melbourne City	28	(1)
2020–2021	Xanthi	18	(1)
2021–2023	Melbourne Victory	50	(5)
2023–2026	Western Sydney Wanderers	18	(1)
2026–	Bankstown City	3	(0)

International career^{‡}
2011–2013	Australia U20	18	(2)
2014–2016	Australia U23	10	(1)
2013–2014	Australia	5	(0)
- * Club domestic league appearances and goals as of 17 July 2026 ‡ National team caps and goals as of 15 December 2017

Joshua Brillante (Italian: [briˈlːante]; born 25 March 1993) is an Australian professional soccer player who plays as a defensive midfielder for NSW League One club Bankstown City. Brillante holds dual citizenship due to his Italian heritage.

== Club career ==
=== Gold Coast United ===
Brillante made his A-League debut for Gold Coast on 3 December in a 1–0 loss to the North Queensland Fury.

=== Newcastle Jets ===
On 12 May 2012 it was announced he had signed for A-League club the Newcastle Jets.

=== ACF Fiorentina ===
On 15 July 2014, it was announced that Brillante decided to join Italian Serie A club Fiorentina. He made his debut for La Viola against Roma in their 2014–15 Serie A opener at the Stadio Olimpico. He was subbed after 35 minutes. His later start was against Peru side Universitario where he scored the one and only goal in the match.

==== Loan to Empoli ====
Joshua Brillante went on loan to Empoli whom are also in the Serie A during the January 2015 mid season transfer period.

==== Loan to Como ====
Initially starting the 2015–16 season on loan from Fiorentina to Empoli, Joshua Brillante signed a new loan deal on 28 August 2015 with Como of the Serie B for the remainder of the season.

Joshua Brillante made his debut for Como on 12 September 2015 away to Livorno.

=== Sydney FC ===
On 12 July 2016 Brillante returned to the A-League, joining Sydney FC on a three-year deal. He scored his first domestic league goal against the Brisbane Roar on 19 November that year. He scored his second goal of the season against Perth Glory in the semi-final.

=== Melbourne City ===
At the end of his contract with Sydney FC, Brillante was in talks to extend, but in the end was signed by Melbourne City, reportedly on a multi-year season contract.

=== Xanthi ===
In September 2020, Brillante left Melbourne City to join Greek club Xanthi under the coaching of Tony Popovic.

=== Melbourne Victory ===
In July 2021, Brillante returned to his home country to play for the Melbourne Victory also under coach Tony Popovic. He was named captain ahead of the 2021/22 season despite not having played a competitive game for the team. After 50 league games for the club and despite having a year remaining on his contract, Brillante mutually terminated his contract with the club.

=== Western Sydney Wanderers ===
Shortly thereafter, on 9 July 2023, he signed a 2-year contract with Western Sydney Wanderers, becoming the sixth A-League Men club he will have represented.

== International career ==
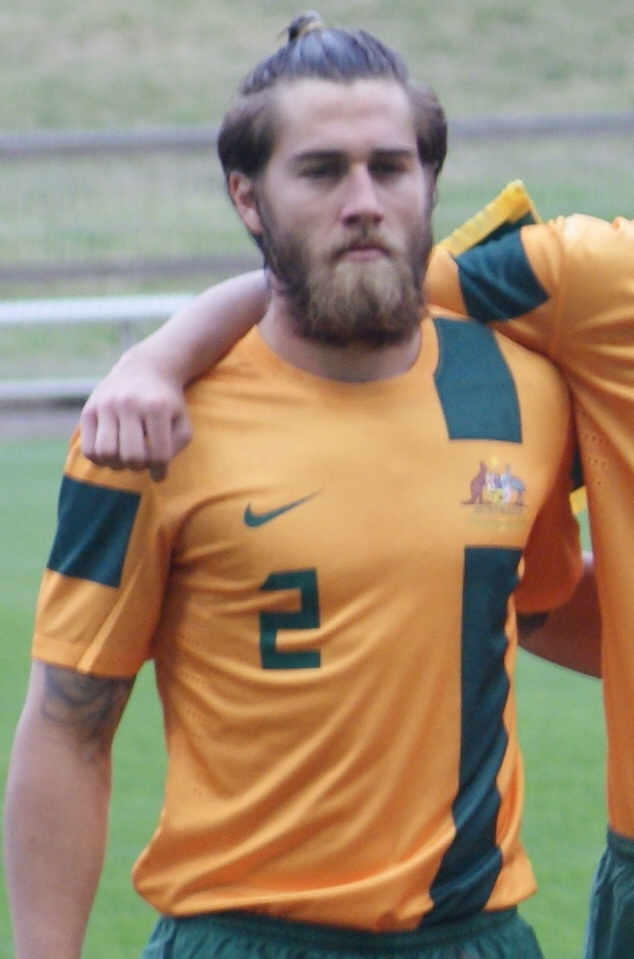
Brillante with the Young Socceroos in 2013

Brillante represented Australia at U20 level at the 2012 AFC U-19 Championship in United Arab Emirates and at the 2013 FIFA U-20 World Cup in Turkey. In May 2018 he was named in Australia’s preliminary 26 man squad for the 2018 World Cup in Russia.

== Career statistics ==
=== Club ===
As of match played 27 April 2024

Appearances and goals by club, season and competition
Club	Season	League			Cup		Continental		Total	
Club	Season	Division	Apps	Goals	Apps	Goals	Apps	Goals	Apps	Goals
Gold Coast United	2010–11	A-League	2	0	—		—		2	0
Gold Coast United	2011–12	A-League	12	0	—		—		12	0
Gold Coast United	Total		14	0	—		—		14	0
Newcastle Jets	2012–13	A-League	22	0	—		—		22	0
Newcastle Jets	2013–14	A-League	24	0	—		—		24	0
Newcastle Jets	Total		46	0	—		—		46	0
Fiorentina	2014–15	Serie A	2	0	0	0	0	0	2	0
Empoli (loan)	2014–15	Serie A	1	0	0	0	—		1	0
Como (loan)	2015–16	Serie B	21	0	0	0	—		21	0
Sydney FC	2016–17	A-League	26	2	5	0	—		31	2
Sydney FC	2017–18	A-League	26	1	5	0	6	0	37	1
Sydney FC	2018–19	A-League	27	0	0	0	4	0	31	0
Sydney FC	Total		79	3	10	0	10	0	99	3
Melbourne City	2019–20	A-League	28	1	5	0	—		33	0
Xanthi	2020–21	Super League Greece 2	18	1	0	0	—		18	1
Melbourne Victory	2021–22	A-League Men	26	2	3	2	1	0	30	4
Melbourne Victory	2022–23	A-League Men	24	3	1	0	—		25	3
Melbourne Victory	Total		50	5	4	2	1	0	55	7
Western Sydney Wanderers	2023–24	A-League Men	18	1	3	0	—		21	1
Career total			277	11	22	2	11	0	310	13

=== International ===
As of 15 October 2014

Australia national team
Year	Apps	Goals
2013	1	0
2014	4	0
Total	5	0

== Honours ==
=== Club ===
Gold Coast United

- National Youth League: 2009–10, 2010–11

Sydney FC

- A-League Premiership: 2016–17, 2017–18
- A-League Championship: 2016–17, 2018–19
- FFA Cup: 2017

Melbourne Victory

- FFA Cup: 2021

=== Individual ===
- FFA Male U20 Footballer of the Year: 2013
- PFA A-League Team of the Year: 2016–17, 2017–18, 2021–22
