= Brandon O'Neill =

Australian soccer player (born 1994)

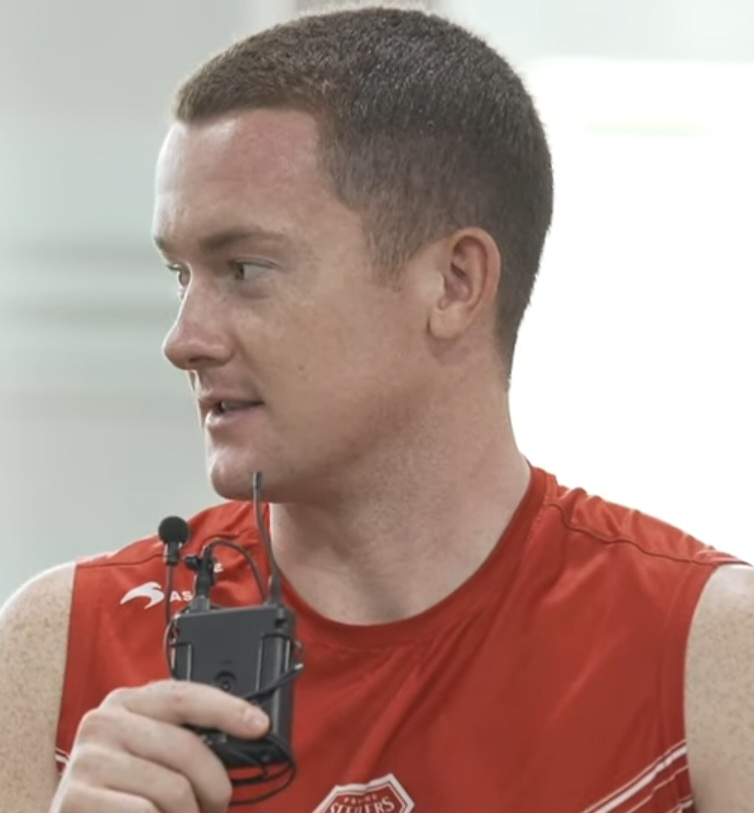

Personal information
- Full name: Brandon O'Neill
- Date of birth: 12 April 1994 (age 32)
- Place of birth: Perth, Western Australia
- Height: 1.79 m (5 ft 10 1/2 in)
- Position: Defensive midfielder

Team information
- Current team: Perth Glory
- Number: 6

Youth career
- ECU Joondalup
- 2011–2012: Perth Glory
- 2011: WA NTC

Senior career*
Years	Team	Apps	(Gls)
2009–2011	ECU Joondalup	29	(0)
2012–2015	Perth Glory	17	(0)
2014–2015	Perth Glory NPL	5	(1)
2015–2020	Sydney FC	111	(8)
2020	Pohang Steelers	13	(0)
2020–2021	Buriram United	10	(0)
2021–2022	Perth Glory	10	(1)
2022–2024	Newcastle Jets	39	(1)
2024–	Perth Glory	21	(0)
2026–	→ Perth RedStar	7	(0)

International career^{‡}
2016–2018	Australia U23	2	(0)
2019	Australia	1	(0)
- * Club domestic league appearances and goals as of 15 August 2026 ‡ National team caps and goals as of 7 June 2019

Brandon O'Neill (born 12 April 1994) is an Australian professional soccer player who plays as a defensive midfielder for Perth RedStar in the NPL WA, on loan from Perth Glory.

== Club career ==
=== Perth Glory ===
Born in Perth, Western Australia, O'Neill signed a youth contract with A-League club Perth Glory in 2010 and then re-signed again in 2011. He made his professional debut in the 2011–12 A-League season on 18 March 2012 in a round 26 clash against Gold Coast United at the Robina Stadium.

On 3 May 2012 it was announced he had signed a two-year senior contract with Perth Glory

=== Sydney FC ===
On 25 May 2015, O'Neill signed a two-year contract with Sydney FC.

O'Neill scored his first A-League goal in the Sydney Derby on Saturday 8 October 2016 by bending a free kick around the wall from just outside the penalty area into the top right corner. He scored his second goal of the season, also from a free kick against Melbourne City on Friday 24 February 2017 by curling the ball over the wall and into the top corner.

Following performances which made him a key member of the starting squad, Sydney FC re-signed O'Neill for another two years on 13 December 2016.

On 26 March 2017, O'Neill scored his third goal for Sydney FC away at Perth Glory, with a low and hard shot from outside the box, as the Sky Blues ran out 3–0 winners and secured the premiers plate.

=== Pohang Stelers ===
On 13 January 2020, it was announced that K League 1 side Pohang Steelers had reached an agreement with Sydney for the transfer of O'Neill. The fee is believed to be between $250,000 and $300,000 AUD, with the player agreeing to sign a two-year deal.

=== Buriram United ===
On 3 December 2020, O'Neill signed for Thai League 1 club, Buriram United.

=== Return to Perth ===
On 1 July 2021, it was announced that O'Neill would return to his hometown club on a three-year deal. Following the departure of Diego Castro, O’Neill was announced on 28 October as captain for the 2021/22 season.

=== Newcastle Jets ===
In June 2022, O'Neill signed for Newcastle Jets for the next two seasons.

=== Return to Perth again ===
On 31 May 2024, Perth announced O'Neill had re-signed for the club once again, on a two-year contract.

==== Loan to Perth RedStar ====
On 5 June 2026, Perth announced that O'Neill joined NPL WA club Perth RedStar on loan until the end of the 2026 season.

== Club statistics ==
As of match played on 22 April 2023

Appearances and goals by club, season and competition
Club	Season	League			National Cup		Continental		Total	
Club	Season	Division	Apps	Goals	Apps	Goals	Apps	Goals	Apps	Goals
Perth Glory	2011–12	A-League	3	0	—		—		3	0
Perth Glory	2012–13	A-League	3	0	—		—		3	0
Perth Glory	2013–14	A-League	8	0	—		—		8	0
Perth Glory	2014–15	A-League	3	0	0	0	—		3	0
Perth Glory	Total		17	0	0	0	0	0	17	0
Sydney FC	2015–16	A-League	21	0	1	0	7	1	29	1
Sydney FC	2016–17	A-League	27	3	2	0	—		29	3
Sydney FC	2017–18	A-League	27	2	2	0	5	0	34	2
Sydney FC	2018–19	A-League	29	2	5	0	5	1	39	3
Sydney FC	2019–20	A-League	7	1	1	0	0	0	8	1
Sydney FC	Total		111	8	11	0	17	2	139	10
Pohang Steelers	2020	K League 1	13	0	3	0	—		16	0
Buriram United	2020–21	Thai League 1	10	0	3	0	—		13	1
Perth Glory	2021–22	A-League	10	1	—		—		10	1
Newcastle Jets	2022–23	A-League	16	1	1	0	—		17	1
Career Total			177	10	18	0	17	2	212	12

== International career ==
He made his debut for Australia national soccer team on 7 June 2019 in a friendly against South Korea, as a starter.

== Honours ==
Team

Sydney FC

- A-League Premiership: 2016–2017, 2017–2018
- A-League Championship: 2017, 2019
- FFA Cup: 2017

Individual

- PFA A-League Team of the Season: 2018-2019
