= Bernie Ibini-Isei =

Australian soccer player (born 1992)

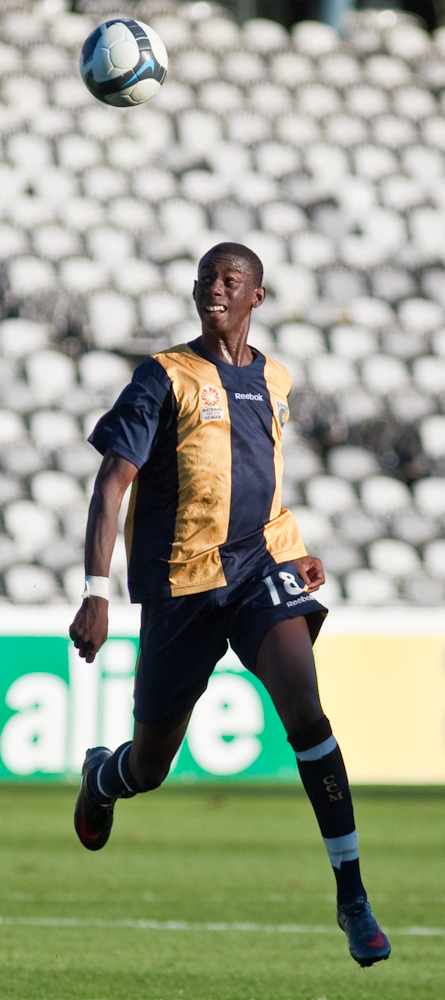
- Ibini playing for Central Coast Mariners Youth in 2010

Personal information
- Full name: Bernie Alpha Ibini-Isei
- Date of birth: 12 September 1992 (age 34)
- Place of birth: Port Harcourt, Nigeria
- Height: 1.87 m (6 ft 2 in)
- Positions: Winger; forward

Youth career
- Blacktown City
- 2009–2011: Central Coast Mariners

Senior career*
Years	Team	Apps	(Gls)
2010–2013	Central Coast Mariners	61	(15)
2010–2011	→ Blacktown City (loan)	12	(1)
2013–2015	Shanghai Dongya	10	(0)
2013–2014	→ Central Coast Mariners (loan)	16	(6)
2014–2015	→ Sydney FC (loan)	28	(7)
2015–2017	Club Brugge	0	(0)
2016–2017	→ Sydney FC (loan)	20	(3)
2017–2018	Vancouver Whitecaps	25	(1)
2018–2019	Emirates Club	8	(1)
2019	Jeonbuk Hyundai Motors	13	(1)
2020	Newcastle Jets	6	(1)
2020–2022	Western Sydney Wanderers	46	(5)
2023	Lion City Sailors	8	(0)

International career^{‡}
2011	Australia U20	6	(1)
2011	Australia U23	1	(0)
2014–2015	Australia	2	(0)
- * Club domestic league appearances and goals as of 2 May 2023 ‡ National team caps and goals as of 15 October 2014

Bernie Alpha Ibini-Isei (born 12 September 1992), also known simply as Bernie Ibini, is a professional football player who plays as a forward or a winger, and most recently played for Singapore Premier League club Lion City Sailors. Born in Nigeria, Ibini-Isei represented Australia internationally.

== Early life ==
Bernie Ibini-Isei immigrated to Australia from Nigeria when he was a child, and grew up in Sydney's Canterbury-Bankstown region. His passion for soccer was obvious from a very young age, and at the age of six years old he was registered to play for his local club Earlwood Wanderers.

He has a sister, Princess Ibini-Isei, who is also a soccer player, playing for Sydney FC in the W-League and the Australian team.

== Club career ==
Ibini started playing soccer for New South Wales Premier League club Blacktown City at youth level. He was immediately recognized as a player with immense potential and was selected to join Westfields Sports High School.

=== Central Coast Mariners ===
In 2009, he was signed by the Central Coast Mariners to join their youth team in the A League competition. In 2009, he received the Golden Boot Award in the National Youth League and was quickly promoted to the senior team, where he made his debut on 12 February 2010, in their round 27 clash against Wellington Phoenix at Westpac Stadium in Wellington. Ibini-Isei made his starting debut for the Mariners against the Gold Coast and scored in a 3–1 win. After just his third start for the Central Coast Mariners Ibini-Isei scored the second goal for the Central Coast Mariners against Perth Glory. His speed and skill quickly gained the attention of the Australian under 20 National Team coach to play a key role in the U20 World Cup.

His consistent development and performances earned Bernie a two-year contract extension with the club, and on 1 February 2012 it was announced that he had signed a two-year contract extension with Central Coast Mariners.

=== Shanghai East Asia ===
On 4 June 2013, after his superb performances in the 2012/2013 Asian Champions League round of 16 clash against Guangzhou Evergrande, Central Coast Mariners received a record bid for Ibini from Shanghai East Asia FC who were keen to add to their squad list for the Chinese Super League. Three days later his move to newly promoted Chinese Super League side Shanghai East Asia, was complete with Ibini signing a three-year contract. This move made Ibini one of the most expensive under 21 players in Asia. Bernie made an immediate impact in the Chinese Super League with his speed and skill playing as a wide striker. However, in November 2013, due to the unexpected tragic death of his father Ibini gained permission to return to the Australian A League, and previous club Central Coast Mariners on loan on compassionate grounds. The loan move took effect on 8 January 2014 and was until 31 May 2014 after which he was then to return to Shanghai.

==== Loan to Sydney FC ====
In May 2014 Ibini signed for Sydney FC on loan, making his debut in round 1 of the A League season against Melbourne City. Ibini scored his first goal in the Sydney Derby in a 1–1 draw. In the last three rounds of the A league season Ibini scored three goals: a contender for goal of the season against Perth Glory, a lob over the goalkeeper against Newcastle United and a solo goal against Wellington Phoenix. Although Sydney wanted to keep Ibini, he was recalled by Shanghai on 3 June 2015 Ibini played in every A-League fixture for Sydney during the 2014–15 season.

=== Club Brugge ===
Following his release from Sydney, due to his contract ending on 1 May, Ibini missed out on playing against 2014–15 Premier League champions Chelsea in a friendly at ANZ Stadium. It was shortly announced thereafter that Ibini had gained permission from Shanghai East Asia to travel to Belgium for a medical with Club Brugge with Shanghai unlikely to retain him due to their foreign player quota already filled. He signed a three-year deal with the club on 5 June 2015. It was announced that Ibini would wear the number 11 shirt.

==== Second loan to Sydney FC ====
After being ruled out for the 2015–16 Belgian Pro League season due to a broken leg he suffered in his first training session with Club Brugge, it was announced on 21 July 2016 that Ibini would return to Sydney FC on a loan deal once again. He made his return from injury in an FFA Cup semi-final against Canberra Olympic on 19 October 2016, coming on as a second-half substitute and scoring a late goal in a 3–0 win.

==== Vancouver Whitecaps ====
On 9 May 2017, Ibini signed with Major League Soccer club Vancouver Whitecaps on a one-year deal with an option to make it a two-year deal. On 8 August 2018, the Whitecaps announced that they and Ibini-Isei had "mutually agreed to a contract termination" to allow him to sign with Emirates Club of the UAE Pro League.

==== Jeonbuk Hyundai ====
In January 2019 Ibini signed with Korean side Jeonbuk Hyundai Motors. He left Jeonbuk, and arranged a transfer to Esteghlal only for the contract to be rescinded after Ibini failed a medical clearance at the club.

=== Return to Australia ===
==== Newcastle Jets & Western Sydney Wanderers ====
After his unsuccessful attempt to land a contract in Iran, Ibini returned to Australia and signed a short-term contract with Newcastle Jets, re-uniting with manager Carl Robinson whom he had played under at Vancouver. Carl Robinson would quit his position as manager at the Hunter based club after less than a year, citing financial reasons at the club as part of his motive, joining Sydney rival Western Sydney Wanderers, signing a lucrative 3-year deal. In a move that was seen as controversial for its reasoning, Ibini would follow Robinson to Western Sydney only days later, signing a 2-year deal with the Western Sydney club. after nearly 50 league appearances for the Wanderers he was released.

=== Lion City Sailors ===
Following his release from the Wanderers, Ibini signed for Singapore Premier League club Lion City Sailors for the 2023 season. His contract was mutually terminated on 15 August following lackluster performances and the signing of Richairo Živković.

== International career ==
Ibini made his debut for the Australian U-20 team in 2011, coming on as a second-half substitute in a 1–0 win against Germany U-20.

On 7 March 2011, he was selected to represent the Australia Olympic football team in an Asian Olympic Qualifier match against Iraq.

On 10 October 2014, he made his debut for the Australian senior team, starting in a friendly match against the United Arab Emirates in preparation for the 2015 AFC Asian Cup.

== Career statistics ==
As of match played 8 August 2021

Appearances and goals by club, season and competition
Club	Season	League			Cup		Continental		Total	
Club	Season	Division	Apps	Goals	Apps	Goals	Apps	Goals	Apps	Goals
Central Coast Mariners	2009–10	A-League	1	0	—		—		1	0
Central Coast Mariners	2010–11	A-League	4	1	—		—		4	1
Central Coast Mariners	2011–12	A-League	29	7	—		6	0	35	7
Central Coast Mariners	2012–13	A-League	27	7	—		8	0	35	7
Central Coast Mariners	Total		61	15	0	0	14	0	75	15
Blacktown City (loan)	2010	NSW Premier League	12	1	2	0	—		14	1
Shanghai Dongya	2013	Chinese Super League	10	0	1	0	—		11	0
Central Coast Mariners (loan)	2013–14	A-League	16	6	—		5	0	21	6
Sydney FC (loan)	2014–15	A-League	28	7	2	0	0	0	30	7
Club Brugge	2015–16	Belgian Pro League	0	0	0	0	0	0	0	0
Sydney FC (loan)	2016–17	A-League	20	3	1	1	0	0	21	4
Vancouver Whitecaps	2017	Major League Soccer	17	1	0	0	—		17	1
Vancouver Whitecaps	2018	Major League Soccer	8	0	1	0	—		9	0
Vancouver Whitecaps	Total		25	1	1	0	0	0	26	1
Emirates Club	2018–19	UAE Pro League	8	1	2	0	—		10	1
Jeonbuk Hyundai Motors	2019	K League 1	13	1	0	0	2	0	15	1
Newcastle Jets	2019–20	A-League	6	1	0	0	—		6	1
Western Sydney Wanderers	2020–21	A-League	26	4	0	0	—		26	4
Western Sydney Wanderers	2021–22	A-League	20	1	2	1	—		22	2
Western Sydney Wanderers	Total		46	5	2	1	0	0	48	6
Career total			245	41	11	2	21	0	277	43

== Honours ==
Central Coast Mariners

- A-League Premiership: 2011–12
- A-League Championship: 2012–13

Sydney FC

- A-League Premiership: 2016–17

Jeonbuk Hyundai Motors

- K League 1: 2019

Individual

- Y-League Golden Boot: 2010–11
- A-League All Star: 2014
