= Bai Antoniou =

Australian footballer

Personal information
- Full name: Bai Andrew Antoniou
- Date of birth: 4 June 1997 (age 29)
- Place of birth: Sydney, Australia
- Height: 1.75 m (5 ft 9 in)
- Positions: Forward; fullback

Team information
- Current team: Bankstown City Lions

Youth career
- 2014–2016: Sydney FC

Senior career*
Years	Team	Apps	(Gls)
2015	Sutherland Sharks	19	(5)
2016–2017	Sydney FC NPL	35	(22)
2016–2017	Sydney FC	0	(0)
2018	Rockdale City Suns	19	(4)
2018–2019	Alki Oroklini	1	(0)
2019	→ Onisilos Sotira 2014 (loan)		
2019	Sutherland Sharks	8	(3)
2020	Sydney Olympic	6	(1)
2021–2025	Rockdale Ilinden	92	(12)
2025	St George FC	30	(11)
2026–	Bankstown City Lions	20	(10)

International career^{‡}
2012	Australia U17	2	(1)
- * Club domestic league appearances and goals as of 29 June 2026 ‡ National team caps and goals as of 25 November 2018

Bai Andrew Antoniou (born 4 June 1997) is an Australian professional footballer who plays as a forward for Bankstown City Lions in NSW League One.

== Club career ==
He finished third highest league scorer in the 2016 NPL NSW 2 season with 20 goals.

In 2016, he was promoted to the Sydney FC first team alongside Charles Lokolingoy.

Antoniou signed with Cypriot First Division side Alki Oroklini in mid 2018. He moved to Cypriot Second Division side Onisilos Sotira on loan in January 2019.

In 2021, Antoniou returned to Rockdale Ilinden.

== International career ==
Antoniou has represented Australia under-17, and scored a goal in a loss to Iran in the quarterfinals of the 2012 AFC U-16 Championship.
