= Nicola Kuleski =

Macedonian footballer

Personal information
- Full name: Nicola Kuleski
- Date of birth: 7 May 1996 (age 30)
- Place of birth: Sydney, Australia
- Height: 1.83 m (6 ft 0 in)
- Position: Midfielder

Team information
- Current team: Blacktown Spartans
- Number: 11

Youth career
- Marconi Stallions
- Blacktown City
- Sydney FC

Senior career*
Years	Team	Apps	(Gls)
2015	Manly United	14	(0)
2015–2017	Sydney FC NPL	47	(5)
2017	Sydney FC	1	(0)
2018–2021	Sydney Olympic	71	(5)
2022–2023	Rockdale Ilinden	37	(0)
2024-	Blacktown Spartans	2	(0)

International career^{‡}
2015–2017	Macedonia U21	5	(0)
- * Club domestic league appearances and goals as of 13 May 2024 ‡ National team caps and goals as of 17 November 2017

Nicola Kuleski (Macedonian: Никола Кулески; born 7 May 1996) is a professional footballer who currently plays as central midfielder for Blacktown Spartans in NSW League One. Born in Australia, he has represented North Macedonia at youth level.

== Club career ==
Being born to a father who was a professional football player himself, Nicola started playing football at a very young age (when he was only 4 years old), and he first started training by the local club Marconi Stallions at the age of 7.

He primarily plays as a central midfielder, but he also plays attacking or defensive midfield.

=== Sydney FC ===
In 2015 Kuleski joined Sydney FC where he started off by playing for the youth team, where he also served as co captain in the 2016–17 season. On 8 April 2017 he also made his debut for the first team of Sydney, arriving in the 80th minute as a substitute for Aaron Calver, in the A-League encounter against Wellington Phoenix which finished 1–1.

=== Sydney Olympic ===
On 11 October 2017, it was announced that Kuleski would be leaving Sydney FC to join NPL1 team Sydney Olympic for their upcoming 2018 season.

== International career ==
Being born in Australia to Macedonian parents, Nicola was originally eligible to play for both - the Australian and Macedonian national team on international level, and he made his decision at the time to represent Macedonia. He started playing for Macedonia's U17 and U19 national teams. He is still eligible to represent both Australia and Macedonia at senior level.

On 5 September 2015, Kuleski made his debut for Macedonia U21 in a friendly against Australia U23 which Macedonia won with 3:1. Nicola played the game as a starter and played a solid game against his home country, he got substituted in the 81' minute.

== Personal life ==
Nicola was born to a Macedonian father - Blagoja Kuleski who was a professional football player, having played the former Yugoslav First League and for several Australian NSL football clubs throughout his 20-year football career.

Aside from playing football, Nicola is also a part-time student at the Macquarie University doing a Bachelor of Science degree in Information Technology.
