= Jordy Buijs =

Dutch footballer (born 1988)

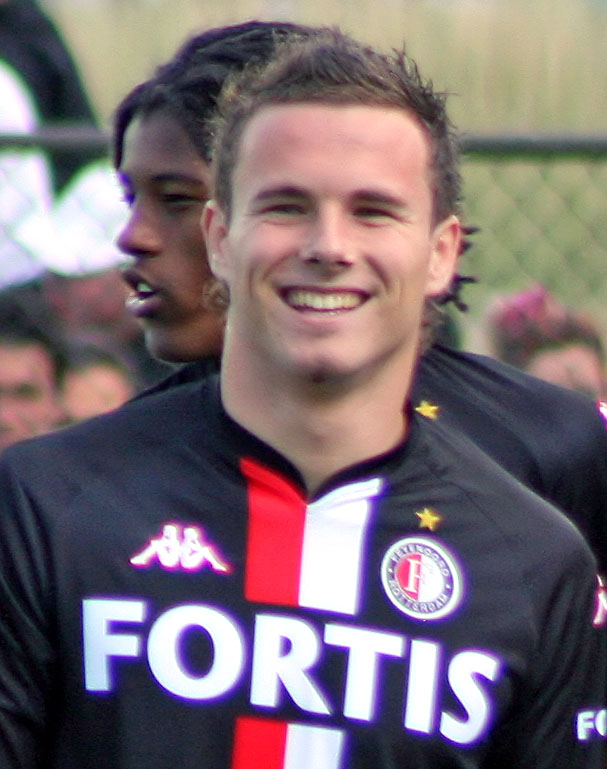
- Buijs training with Feyenoord.

Personal information
- Full name: Jordy Buijs
- Date of birth: 28 December 1988 (age 37)
- Place of birth: Ridderkerk, Netherlands
- Height: 1.86 m (6 ft 1 in)
- Position: Centre back

Team information
- Current team: Willem II (coach)

Youth career
- –1995: Slikkerveer
- 1995–2007: Feyenoord

Senior career*
Years	Team	Apps	(Gls)
2007–2008	Feyenoord	0	(0)
2008	→ De Graafschap	6	(0)
2008–2011	De Graafschap	89	(10)
2011–2014	NAC	92	(11)
2014–2016	Heerenveen	15	(0)
2016	Roda JC	17	(1)
2016	Pandurii Târgu Jiu	7	(0)
2017–2018	Sydney FC	40	(1)
2018–2019	V-Varen Nagasaki	16	(1)
2019	→ Tokushima Vortis (loan)	39	(8)
2020–2022	Kyoto Sanga	80	(7)
2022–2023	Fagiano Okayama	77	(11)
2024	RKSV Halsteren		
2024–2025	TSC Oosterhout		
Total		478	(50)

Managerial career
- 2024-: Willem II (academy)
- * Club domestic league appearances and goals as of 22:49, 23 November 2022 (UTC)

Jordy Buijs (Dutch pronunciation: [ˈjɔrdi ˈbœys]; born 28 December 1988, in Ridderkerk) is a Dutch retired footballer who played as a centre back. He could also play as a midfielder.

Buijs is a player with a great ability to read the game and who is steady in passing. He joined Feyenoord's youth squad in 1995. He participated with the Netherlands under 17 squad at the 2005 under 17 European Championships, where the Dutch reached the final. Buijs provided the assist for the winning goal in the semi-final against Italy. He also took part with the same team at the Under 17 World Championships in Peru where they became third. Dutch under 17 coach Ruud Kaiser said Jordy Buijs is a winners type, who is good in one on one clashes, who has a great heading ability and an absolute peach of a free-kick on him.

== Career ==
=== Feyenoord ===
In July 2007 Buijs became officially part of Feyenoord's first team managed by Bert van Marwijk. He was awarded squad number 23. But, after having no chances on the first team, he was loaned to De Graafschap for a half-year period, on 30 January 2008.

=== De Graafschap ===
In his first period at De Graafschap he didn't play that much. In the second half of the 2007/2008 season he only played in 6 Eredivisie games for De Graafschap. Although he didn't play a lot of games De Graafschap decided to sign Jordy Buijs. In the beginning of the 2008/2009 season Buijs still wasn't a first eleven player. But during the season Buijs became important player. He played on the left back position but also on the midfield. He scored his first goal for De Graafschap in the home game versus Sparta Rotterdam. He scored the 3–1. Unfortunately the game ended in a 3–3 draw. He played in 28 games in the Eredivisie in the 2008/2009 season. He also scored a beautiful free kick in the play-off match versus MVV Maastricht. Jordy Buijs became a fan favorite and is well known with his rushes down the leftflank and his clever passes.

=== NAC Breda ===
In the summer of 2011, Buijs signed a three-year contract with NAC and became an important player for the team. He again played both as a centre back and a defensive midfielder. After three seasons, Buijs left as a free agent as he claimed to be ready for a new challenge

=== SC Heerenveen ===
Buijs found this new challenge with SC Heerenveen and signed a two-year contract, having denied offers from ADO Den Haag, FC Groningen and Panathinaikos. However, he left them after half a season by mutual consent for Roda JC. In summer 2016 he moved abroad to play for Romanian side Pandurii Târgu Jiu.

=== Sydney FC ===
On 13 January 2017, Buijs signed with A-League club Sydney FC on a 5 month contract, with an option for an extra year. He made his debut for the club in its annual 'Big Blue' Australia Day derby clash against Melbourne Victory helping his team to a 2–1 win at Etihad Stadium.

On 29 April 2017, Buijs scored his first goal for Sydney FC, in a 3–0 win over Perth Glory in the A-League finals series. The goal was the first ever to be reviewed by the video assistant referee (VAR).

The Dutchman re-signed with Sydney FC for another year on 15 May 2017.

On 1 August 2017, Buijs scored his second goal for Sydney FC, in the 2017 FFA Cup Round of 32 against Darwin Rovers FC in a record 8–0 victory. In the quarter-final, Buijs scored a free-kick against Melbourne City in a 2–0 victory. On 9 May 2018, Jordy Buijs was released by Sydney FC.

On 10 July 2018, it was announced that he would join V-Varen Nagasaki on and one-and-a-half-year contract.

On his return to the Netherlands, Buijs had a short spell at amateur side Halsteren before joining TSC Oosterhout. He also took up an academy coaching role at Willem II.

== Career statistics ==
As of 12 November 2023.

Appearances and goals by club, season and competition
Club	Season	League			National cup (Note: Includes Emperor's Cup, Moldovan Cup)		League cup (Note: Includes J.League Cup)		Continental		Other		Total	
Club	Season	Division	Apps	Goals	Apps	Goals	Apps	Goals	Apps	Goals	Apps	Goals	Apps	Goals
De Graafschap (loan)	2007–08	Eredivisie	6	0	—		—		—		—		6	0
De Graafschap	2008–09	Eredivisie	28	1	3	0	—		—		5	1	36	2
De Graafschap	2009–10	Eerste Divisie	32	9	1	0	—		—		—		33	9
De Graafschap	2010–11	Eredivisie	29	0	1	0	—		—		—		30	0
De Graafschap	Total		95	10	5	0	—		—		5	1	105	11
NAC	2011–12	Eredivisie	28	1	1	0	—		—		—		29	1
NAC	2012–13	Eredivisie	32	4	3	0	—		—		—		35	4
NAC	2013–14	Eredivisie	32	6	2	0	—		—		—		34	6
NAC	Total		92	11	6	0	—		—		—		98	11
Heerenveen	2014–15	Eredivisie	12	0	1	0	—		—		—		13	0
Heerenveen	2015–16	Eredivisie	3	0	0	0	—		—		—		3	0
Heerenveen	Total		15	0	1	0	—		—		—		16	0
Roda JC	2015–16	Eredivisie	17	1	0	0	—		—		—		17	1
Pandurii Târgu Jiu	2016–17	Liga I	7	0	0	0	—		1	0	—		8	0
Sydney FC	2016–17	A-League	12	1	—		—		—		—		12	1
Sydney FC	2017–18	A-League	28	0	5	0	—		0	0	—		33	0
Sydney FC	Total		40	1	5	0	—		0	0	—		45	1
V-Varen Nagasaki	2018	J1 League	16	1	0	0	0	0	—		—		16	1
Tokushima Vortis (loan)	2019	J2 League	37	7	0	0	—		—		3	1	40	8
Kyoto Sanga	2020	J2 League	39	2	—		—		—		—		39	2
Kyoto Sanga	2021	J2 League	41	5	0	0	—		—		—		41	5
Kyoto Sanga	Total		80	7	0	0	—		—		—		80	7
Fagiano Okayama	2022	J2 League	39	7	0	0	—		—		1	0	40	7
Fagiano Okayama	2023	J2 League	38	4	1	0	—		—		—		39	4
Fagiano Okayama	Total		77	11	1	0	—		—		1	0	79	11
Career total			476	49	18	0	0	0	1	0	9	2	504	51

== Honours ==
=== Club ===
De Graafschap

- Eerste Divisie: 2009–10

Sydney FC

- A-League Premiership: 2016–2017, 2017–2018
- A-League Championship: 2016–2017
- FFA Cup: 2017

Albirex Niigata

- J2 League : 2022

=== Individual ===
- J2 Monthly MVP : August 2022
- J2 League Best XI: 2022
