= Kris Griffiths-Jones =

Australian football referee

- Full name: Kristian Griffiths-Jones
- Born: Australia
- Other occupation: Account manager

Domestic
Years	League	Role
2009–	A-League	Referee

Kristian Griffiths-Jones is an Australian football referee who currently officiates in the Hyundai A-League and the NSW Premier League. He made his A-League debut in the 2008-09 A-League season. He began his refereeing career with GDFRA (Granville District Football Referees Association), in the Western Suburbs of Sydney.

On 4 April 2017, Griffiths-Jones was appointed as one of the inaugural video assistant referee (VAR's) in the Hyundai A-League, the first top-tier football league in the world to implement the technology.

== Personal life ==
Griffiths-Jones currently works as a referees administrator at Football NSW. He has appeared several times on the A-League satirical show "The B-League", where he became known as "The Marquee Referee", and was coined 'KGJ'.

== History ==
Griffiths-Jones is one of the most experienced referees officiating in the NSW Premier League and has officiated in many important games, including the 2010 Waratah Cup Final as well as the 2016 FNSW NPL1 Grand Final. His debut in the A-League came during Round 20 of the 2008-09 season when he officiated the Newcastle Jets v Perth Glory game.

== Career ==
A-League Matches

- 2008/2009 Season: 1 Match
- 2009/2010 Season: 1 Pre-Season Match
- 2010/2011 Season: 7 Matches (Including: 1 Pre-Season)
- 2011/2012 Season: 12 Matches
- 2012/2013 Season: 11 Matches
- 2013/2014 Season: 21 Matches (Including: 1 Pre-Season and 1 Semi Final)
- 2014/2015 Season: 24 Matches (Including: 2 Pre-Season and 1 Semi Final)
- 2015/2016 Season: 12 Matches (Including: 1 Pre-Season)
- 2016/2017 Season: 13 Matches (Including: 1 Semi-Final)

Griffiths-Jones has been involved with several friendly and high profile matches. In 2016, he was the referee for the Liverpool Legends vs Australia Legends game held at ANZ Stadium on 7 January. For the first time in Australian footballing history, Griffiths-Jones wore a head-mounted camera and microphone for the duration of the match, providing broadcasters FoxSports with unprecedented views of the game.

In addition, Griffiths-Jones served as 4th Official for the Sydney FC vs Tottenham Hotspur game at ANZ Stadium in 2015, as well as the Sydney FC vs Arsenal match at the same venue in 2017.
