= The Big Blue (A-Leagues) =

Australian association football rivalry

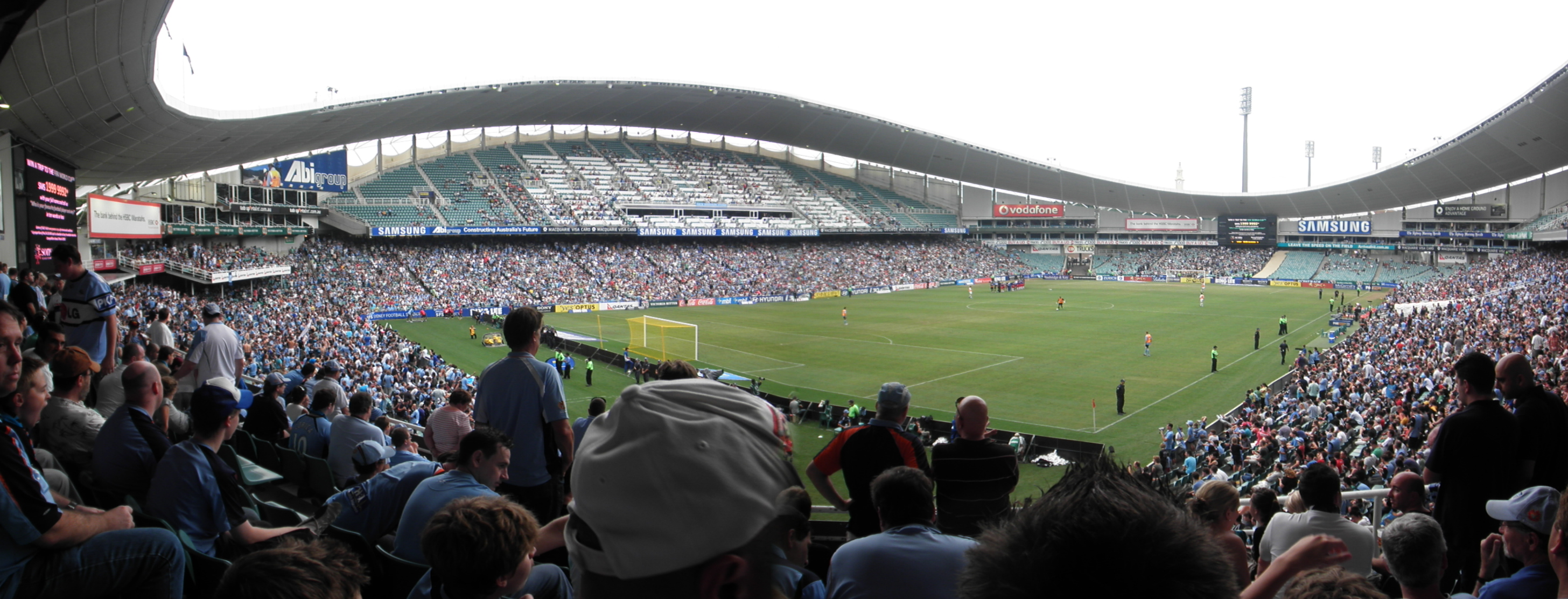
- Sydney FC vs Melbourne Victory, Allianz Stadium, February 2010
- Location: Melbourne; Sydney (Southeast Australia)
- Teams: Melbourne Victory; Sydney FC
- First meeting: 28 August 2005; A-League; Sydney FC 1–1 Melbourne Victory
- Latest meeting: 9 September 2026; Australia Cup; Sydney FC 0–2 Melbourne Victory
- Next meeting: 6 December 2026; A-League Men; Sydney FC v Melbourne Victory

Statistics
- Total meetings: 71
- Most wins: Sydney FC (28)
- Most player appearances: Leigh Broxham (47)
- Top scorer: Archie Thompson (14)
- All-time record: Melbourne Victory: 23; Drawn: 20; Sydney FC: 28
- Largest victory: Melbourne Victory 5–0 Sydney FC (16 October 2005); Melbourne Victory 0–5 Sydney FC (26 January 2014); Sydney FC 6–1 Melbourne Victory (12 May 2019)

The Big Blue, is the name of the association football rivalry in Australia between Sydney FC and Melbourne Victory. While the main colour of both teams and their respective states are shades of the colour blue, in Australian English the word "blue" can also mean "a fight, brawl or heated argument".

Sydney and Melbourne are the two largest cities in Australia, and Sydney FC and Victory are two of the league's most supported and most successful clubs. The rivalry was further sparked by a number of highly competitive meetings between the two teams in early seasons. The Big Blue generally attracts some of the largest crowds and TV audiences of the regular season.

== History ==
=== Regional rivals ===
There has been a long-standing rivalry between the cities of Sydney and Melbourne, the two largest cities in Australia.

In soccer terms, the rivalry has existed for almost 140 years, starting with the first inter-colonial match between Victoria and New South Wales taking place on 16 August 1883 at the East Melbourne Cricket Ground, which ended as a 2–2 draw in front of a crowd of 2,000. These intercolonial and later interstate matches continued regularly as a highlight of early Australian soccer until the outbreak of World War I. Although there were many later matches between various mostly immigrant-founded teams from Melbourne and Sydney in the Australia Cup and the National Soccer League prior to the A-League Men era, the interstate rivalry aspect was not as much of a focus, given the context and identity of the clubs involved.

Sydney FC and Melbourne Victory FC were destined to become major rivals at the inception of the A-League Men due to the historic regional rivalry between their home cities. At the time, the A-League Men operated under the "one-team, one-city" model, so the rivalry was almost instantaneous.

=== Significant moments ===
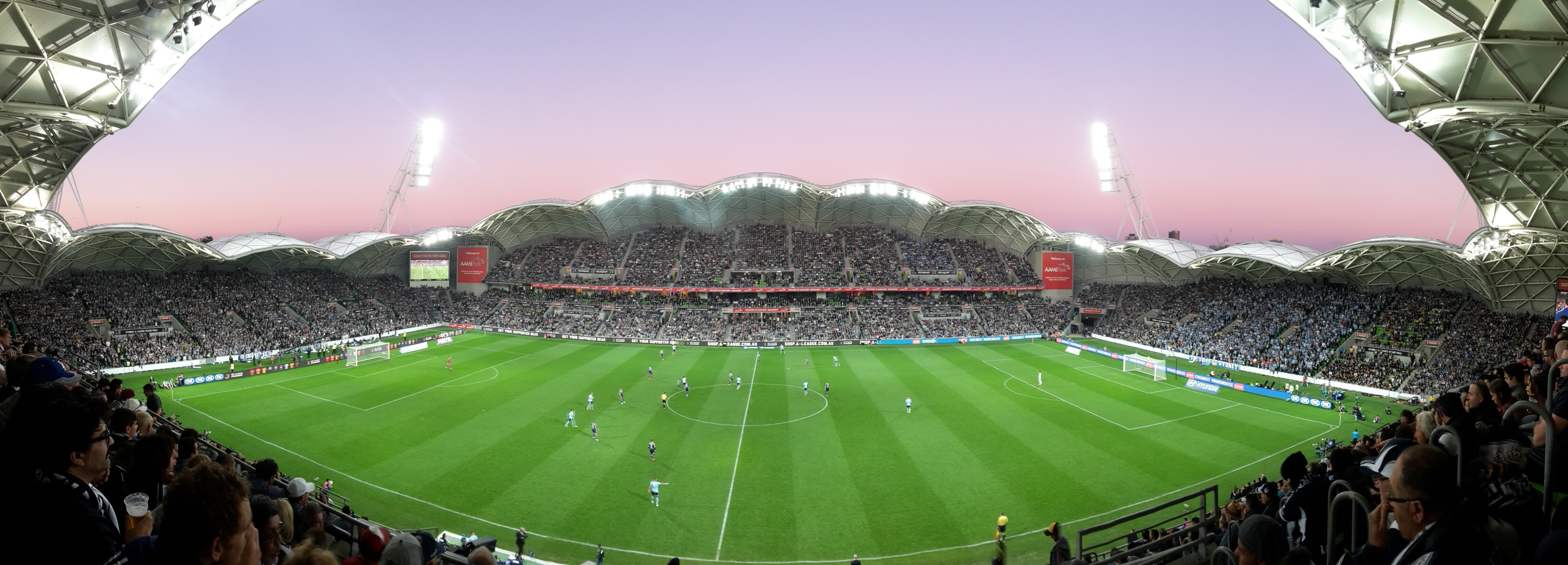
The 2015 A-League Grand Final at AAMI Park.

The first competitive match between the two clubs was significantly played on the opening weekend of the inaugural 2005–06 A-League season. It was held on 28 August 2005, at Sydney FC's home ground, the Sydney Football Stadium. Both teams were eager to stamp their authority as the biggest club in the league, with Sydney FC having already won the 2005 OFC Club Championship during the pre-season. The match ended in a 1-all draw as Victory's first player signing and soon to become stalwart, Archie Thompson, cancelled out Sydney FC's marquee signing, Dwight Yorke's first half goal. The second meeting, on 16 October 2005, resulted in a landslide win for Victory at their then home ground, the Olympic Park Stadium, defeating Sydney FC 5–0. The result still stands as Sydney FC's worst defeat in this fixture.

The first encounter between the clubs during the 2006–07 A-League season (and fourth overall) entrenched the rivalry between the teams as passion and tension fueled the match. Sydney FC skipper, Mark Rudan was sent off after fourteen minutes and Victory player Fred elbowed Sydney FC defender Mark Milligan in the throat. Fred avoided sanction as he was substituted before the referee could see a replay on the big screen. The ugly incident required urgent medical attention as it left Milligan struggling to breathe and there were fears he swallowed his tongue. The following match in Melbourne, the sixth overall, set the record for attendance at an A-League match when 50,333 fans crammed into Etihad Stadium on 8 December 2006. The match ended in a nil-all draw.

After sealing the 2010 Premiership at home on the final day of the season by beating Melbourne 2–0, Sydney FC went on to win the Championship Grand Final on penalties at Melbourne's home stadium.

The rivalry reached another level in 2011, with both teams in pursuit of the signature of Socceroo Harry Kewell pre-season. Melbourne Victory announced they had signed Kewell on 20 August and five days afterwards Sydney FC announced that they had signed Socceroo Brett Emerton from Blackburn Rovers. The teams played out a 0–0 stalemate in the first round of the 2011–12 A-League season, with Australia's head coach not picking either player for national duty, allowing the eagerly-anticipated match up to occur.

A Big Blue match has been played each Australia Day at either the Melbourne Rectangular Stadium or Docklands Stadium in Melbourne since the 2011–12 A-League season which ended in a 2–all draw. However, the 2014–15 A-League season did not feature this fixture due to the 2015 AFC Asian Cup.

Since 2012, the teams have played for the BeyondBlue Cup, which is awarded to the winning team in the Big Blue. Sydney FC claimed the inaugural BeyondBlue Cup by defeating Melbourne Victory 1–0 at Allianz Stadium on 10 March 2012.

On 10 November 2012, Melbourne Victory came from 2–0 down to win 3–2 at Allianz Stadium, with two late goals from substitute player Andrew Nabbout helping them achieve the result. This match turned out of be Ian Crook's last match as Sydney FC manager, as he announced his resignation shortly after the defeat, which was Sydney's fourth in six games.

The fixture played 8 December 2006 holds the record for the second highest attendance at a regular season match with 50,333 in attendance. Currently, three fixtures between the two sides make up the top ten of the League's highest regular season attendances.

With Sydney defeating Melbourne on 3 March 2017 (36th match), they became the first side to win all 3 games of the rivalry in the normal season.

Melbourne Victory and Sydney met in the 2017 A-League Grand Final. Despite Sydney only losing one game throughout the whole season, it was Melbourne Victory who took the lead through a Besart Berisha goal. Sydney FC equalised after halftime thanks to Rhyan Grant. The game went to penalties and Sydney won 4–2 on penalties. It was exactly the same scoreline as their meeting in the 2010 Grand Final.

In the 2026 A-League finals series the clubs would meet in the Elimination Finals stage of the finals. This match would be the first time Victory would meet Sydney since Patrick kisnorbo took the job of Sydney FC coach in March of 2026. This was controversial for Victory Fans as he had previously coached victory before shockingly departing the club early on 17 December 2024. In the pre-game the camera would pan to show Kisnorbo with a large negative response from the Victory fans. To begin the game Victory would start the game strong but Sydney's defence would hold strong. The half would end scoreless with most chances created by Victory while Sydney's goalkeeper Harrison Devenish-Meares kept a strong performance in goals. This pattern would continue into the second half. Then the referee, after giving a penalty to Victory, as Santos and Paul Okon-Engstler collided, was sent to the pitch-side monitor and decided to overturn his original decision. Three minutes after being substituted on Patrick Wood would capitalise on a mistake by Franco Lino in the 80th minute to put Sydney ahead and would eventually be the difference to win Sydney the game and qualify for the semi final against Newcastle Jets.

=== Comparative league placings ===
Pos.	06	07	08	09	10	11	12	13	14	15	16	17	18	19	20	21	22	23	24	25	26
1		1		1	1					1		1	1		1						
2	2				2					2		2		2		2	2				
3			3					3						3					3		
4		4							4				4						4		4
5			5	5		5	5		5									5		5	5
6											6										
7	7							7			7									7	
8							8										8				
9	—N/a					9															
10	—N/a														10						
11	—N/a						—N/a											11			
12	—N/a															12					
13	—N/a																				

== Head-to-head ==
=== Matches summary ===
As of 9 September 2026

Competition	Played	Melbourne Victory wins	Draws	Sydney FC wins
A-League Men regular season	61	18	19	24
A-League Men finals (except Grand Finals)	6	3	1	2
A-League Men Grand Finals	3	1	0	2
A-League Men (overall)	70	22	20	28
Australia Cup	1	1	0	0
Total	71	23	20	28

=== Honours summary ===
Title	Melbourne Victory	Sydney FC
A-League Men Premiership	3	4
A-League Men Championship	4	5
Australia Cup	2	2
Total	9	11

== All-time results ==
=== Regular season matches ===
#	Date	Home team	Score	Away team	Goals (home)	Goals (away)	Venue	Attendance
1	28 August 2005	Sydney	1–1	Melbourne	Yorke (44)	Thompson (72)	Sydney Football Stadium	25,208
2	16 October 2005	Melbourne	5–0	Sydney	Kitzbichler (34), Muscat (53, 78), Thompson (57, 69)	—	Olympic Park Stadium	18,208
3	3 December 2005	Sydney	2–1	Melbourne	Corica (24), Carney (81)	Allsopp (88)	Sydney Football Stadium	17,272
4	2 September 2006	Melbourne	3–2	Sydney	Allsopp (8, 51), Muscat (11 p.)	Fyfe (18), Vargas (83 o.g.)	Docklands Stadium	39,730
5	21 October 2006	Sydney	1–2	Melbourne	Corica (8)	Thompson (50, 73)	Sydney Football Stadium	20,881
6	8 December 2006	Melbourne	0–0	Sydney	—	—	Docklands Stadium	50,333
7	6 October 2007	Sydney	0–1	Melbourne	—	Allsopp (82)	Sydney Football Stadium	18,436
8	10 November 2007	Melbourne	0–0	Sydney	—	—	Docklands Stadium	31,884
9	20 January 2008	Sydney	2–2	Melbourne	Corica (4), Brosque (62)	Milligan (46 o.g.), Allsopp (76)	Sydney Football Stadium	33,458
10	16 August 2008	Sydney	0–0	Melbourne	—	—	Sydney Football Stadium	16,227
11	25 October 2008	Melbourne	0–2	Sydney	—	Bridge (20), Aloisi (62)	Docklands Stadium	31,654
12	27 December 2008	Melbourne	3–2	Sydney	Thompson (14), Ward (78), Ney Fabiano (80)	Cole (1), Gan (4)	Docklands Stadium	33,458
13	9 October 2009	Melbourne	0–3	Sydney	—	Brosque (14), Bridge (17, 19)	Docklands Stadium	30,668
14	19 December 2009	Melbourne	0–0	Sydney	—	—	Docklands Stadium	27,344
15	14 February 2010	Sydney	2–0	Melbourne	Kisel (34), Aloisi (49)	—	Sydney Football Stadium	25,407
16	7 August 2010	Sydney	3–3	Melbourne	Brosque (36), McFlynn (54), Cole (85)	Broxham (66), Dugandzic (67), Celeski (73)	Sydney Football Stadium	12,106
17	16 October 2010	Melbourne	3–0	Sydney	Vargas (20), Hernández (49), Kruse (90)	—	Docklands Stadium	17,299
18	15 January 2011	Sydney	1–1	Melbourne	Mäkelä (90)	Allsopp (51)	Sydney Football Stadium	11,387
19	8 October 2011	Melbourne	0–0	Sydney	—	—	Docklands Stadium	40,351
20	26 January 2012	Melbourne	2–2	Sydney	Cernak (45), Fabio (45+2)	Cazarine (56), Ryall (90)	Melbourne Rectangular Stadium	20,053
21	10 March 2012	Sydney	1–0	Melbourne	Kisel (34 p.)	—	Sydney Football Stadium	18,180
22	10 November 2012	Sydney	2–3	Melbourne	Yau (14), Bosschaart (48)	Nabbout (75, 88), Thompson (83)	Sydney Football Stadium	21,531
23	26 January 2013	Melbourne	3–1	Sydney	Rojas (23, 73), Thompson (67)	Griffiths (75)	Melbourne Rectangular Stadium	26,882
24	16 March 2013	Sydney	1–1	Melbourne	Yau (85)	Milligan (3)	Sydney Football Stadium	22,233
25	9 November 2013	Sydney	3–2	Melbourne	Garcia (3), Ryall (15), Del Piero (37 p.)	Thompson (18), Troisi (27)	Sydney Football Stadium	18,784
26	26 January 2014	Melbourne	0–5	Sydney	—	Despotovic (11), Del Piero (20 p., 54), Ryall (25), Carle (87)	Docklands Stadium	24,354
27	29 March 2014	Melbourne	1–1	Sydney	Troisi (63)	Chianese (48)	Melbourne Rectangular Stadium	20,447
28	15 November 2014	Sydney	0–0	Melbourne	—	—	Sydney Football Stadium	21,242
29	13 December 2014	Melbourne	3–3	Sydney	Thompson (23, 47, 79)	Janko (17), Smeltz (51, 76)	Docklands Stadium	25,242
30	14 February 2015	Sydney	3–3	Melbourne	Janko (8 p.), Smeltz (73 p., 85)	Barbarouses (34), Finkler (41), Ansell (78)	Sydney Football Stadium	17,352
31	14 November 2015	Sydney	2–4	Melbourne	Hološko (5), Brosque (20)	Berisha (9, 90+2), Finkler (28), Barbarouses (68)	Sydney Football Stadium	15,947
32	26 January 2016	Melbourne	1–0	Sydney	Jurman (79 o.g.)	—	Docklands Stadium	30,493
33	27 February 2016	Melbourne	1–1	Sydney	Barbarouses (46)	Carney (76)	Melbourne Rectangular Stadium	20,112
34	5 November 2016	Sydney	2–1	Melbourne	Carney (63, 78)	Austin (41)	Sydney Football Stadium	19,143
35	26 January 2017	Melbourne	1–2	Sydney	Troisi (18)	Hološko (38), Ibini (65)	Docklands Stadium	30,262
36	3 March 2017	Sydney	1–0	Melbourne	Bobô (20)	—	Sydney Football Stadium	13,310
37	7 October 2017	Melbourne	0–1	Sydney	—	Deng (53 o.g.)	Docklands Stadium	24,804
38	26 January 2018	Melbourne	1–3	Sydney	Berisha (58 p.)	Bobô (60, 78 p.), Carney (84)	Melbourne Rectangular Stadium	21,037
39	13 April 2018	Sydney	1–0	Melbourne	Bobô (8)	—	Sydney Football Stadium	15,567
40	25 November 2018	Sydney	1–2	Melbourne	Le Fondre (35)	Toivonen (23), Honda (71 p.)	Jubilee Oval	19,081
41	26 January 2019	Melbourne	2–1	Sydney	Toivonen (20), Troisi (58)	Ninkovic (63)	Melbourne Rectangular Stadium	21,085
42	6 April 2019	Sydney	2–1	Melbourne	O'Neill (6), Ninkovic (90+3)	Barbarouses (16)	Sydney Cricket Ground	14,155
43	17 November 2019	Sydney	2–1	Melbourne	Le Fondre (61), Barbarouses (68)	Toivonen (45)	Jubilee Oval	16,116
44	24 January 2020	Melbourne	0–3	Sydney	—	Le Fondre (27), Barbarouses (53), Baumjohann (85)	Melbourne Rectangular Stadium	17,814
45	7 March 2020	Melbourne	1–4	Sydney	Rojas (5)	Ninkovic (43), Caceres (64), Le Fondre (66), Barbarouses (87 p.)	Docklands Stadium	15,102
46	4 April 2021	Melbourne	0–3	Sydney	—	Bobô (42), Barbarouses (50), Baumjohann (84 p.)	Melbourne Rectangular Stadium	5,347
47	27 April 2021	Sydney	1–0	Melbourne	Bobô (6)	—	Jubilee Oval	4,816
48	19 May 2021	Sydney	2–0	Melbourne	Bobô (10), Barbarouses (83)	—	Jubilee Oval	4,226
49	25 January 2022	Melbourne	2–2	Sydney	Folami (17), Kruse (77)	Ninkovic (37), Bobô (81)	Melbourne Rectangular Stadium	10,496
50	7 May 2022	Sydney	1–4	Melbourne	Le Fondre (16)	D'Agostino (14), Brimmer (30), Geria (38), Hamill (87)	Jubilee Oval	11,404
51	8 October 2022	Sydney	2–3	Melbourne	Mak (15), Donachie (79)	D'Agostino (31), Ikonomidis (67), Brillante (83)	Sydney Football Stadium	21,840
52	26 January 2023	Melbourne	1–2	Sydney	Brimmer (26)	Burgess (32), Le Fondre (52)	Melbourne Rectangular Stadium	8,181
53	4 March 2023	Sydney	1–0	Melbourne	Caceres (35)	—	Sydney Football Stadium	15,167
54	21 October 2023	Sydney	0–2	Melbourne	—	Fornaroli (62), Machach (86)	Sydney Football Stadium	14,586
55	16 December 2023	Melbourne	3–0	Sydney	Arzani (20), Machach (24), Fornaroli (57)	—	Melbourne Rectangular Stadium	14,607
56	26 January 2024	Melbourne	1–1	Sydney	Machach (17)	Courtney-Perkins (10)	Melbourne Rectangular Stadium	18,012
57	28 December 2024	Sydney	3–0	Melbourne	Lolley (2, 26), Kucharski (86)	—	Sydney Football Stadium	20,015
58	24 January 2025	Melbourne	2–0	Sydney	Vergos (24), Fornaroli (90)	—	Melbourne Rectangular Stadium	14,038
59	22 November 2025	Sydney	3–0	Melbourne	Lolley (58, 70), Grant (76)	—	Leichhardt Oval	10,916
60	26 January 2026	Melbourne	4–0	Sydney	Santos (53, 64), Jelacic (79), Jackson (82)	—	Melbourne Rectangular Stadium	14,816
61	7 March 2026	Sydney	2–2	Melbourne	Stamatelopoulos (73), Arslan (75)	Mata (34), Nduka (69)	Sydney Football Stadium	15,071
62	6 December 2026	Sydney	–	Melbourne			Sydney Football Stadium	
63	26 January 2027	Melbourne	–	Sydney			Melbourne Rectangular Stadium	

League home record
Home team	Matches	Wins	Draws	Losses
Sydney	31	14	9	8
Melbourne	30	10	10	10

Overall league head-to-head record
Matches	Sydney FC wins	Melbourne Victory wins	Draws
61	24	18	19

=== Finals series matches ===
#	Date	Round	Home team	Score	Away team	Goals (home)	Goals (away)	Venue	Attendance
1	18 February 2010	Semi-final 1st leg	Melbourne	2–1	Sydney	Mrdja (16), Hernández (40)	Aloisi (43)	Docklands Stadium	28,453
2	7 March 2010	Semi-final 2nd leg	Sydney	2–2 (a.e.t.)	Melbourne	Kisel (36 p.), Bridge (54)	Kruse (15), Thompson (114)	Sydney Football Stadium	23,818
3	20 March 2010	Grand Final	Melbourne	1–1 (a.e.t.) (2–4 p)	Sydney	Leijer (81)	Bridge (63)	Docklands Stadium	44,560
4	18 April 2014	Elimination Final	Melbourne	2–1	Sydney	Thompson (19), Finkler (90+2)	Ryall (33)	Docklands Stadium	20,802
5	17 May 2015	Grand Final	Melbourne	3–0	Sydney	Berisha (33), Barbarouses (83), Broxham (90)	—	Melbourne Rectangular Stadium	29,843
6	7 May 2017	Grand Final	Sydney	1–1 (a.e.t.) (4–2 p)	Melbourne	Grant (69)	Berisha (20)	Sydney Football Stadium	41,546
7	28 April 2018	Semi-final	Sydney	2–3 (a.e.t.)	Melbourne	Nigro (24 o.g.), Antonis (90+5 o.g.)	Barbarouses (31), Troisi (47), Antonis (117)	Sydney Football Stadium	17,775
8	12 May 2019	Semi-final	Sydney	6–1	Melbourne	Calver (3), Brosque (43), Broxham (45+2 o.g.), Le Fondre (63 p., 68), Ninkovic (88)	Toivonen (90+1)	Jubilee Oval	12,141
9	2 May 2026	Elimination final	Melbourne	0–1	Sydney	—	Wood (80)	Melbourne Rectangular Stadium	15,258

Finals home record
Home team	Matches	Wins	Losses	Draws
Sydney	4	2	1	1
Melbourne	5	3	2	0

Overall finals head-to-head record
Matches	Sydney FC wins	Melbourne Victory wins	Draws
9	4	4	1

=== Australia Cup matches ===
#	Date	Home team	Score	Away team	Goals (home)	Goals (away)	Venue	Attendance
1	9 September 2026	Sydney	0–2	Melbourne	—	Jelacic (2), Courtney-Perkins (61 o.g.)	Jubilee Stadium	3,187

Australia Cup home record
Home team	Matches	Wins	Losses	Draws
Sydney	1	0	1	0
Melbourne	0	0	0	0

Overall Australia Cup head-to-head record
Matches	Sydney FC wins	Melbourne Victory wins	Draws
1	0	1	0

== Leading goalscorers (4+ goals) ==
As of 9 September 2026

Player	Club	Goals scored
(Australia) Archie Thompson	Melbourne	14
(New Zealand) Kosta Barbarouses	Melbourne/Sydney	11
(England) Adam Le Fondre	Sydney	8
(Brazil) Bobô	Sydney	8
(Australia) Danny Allsopp	Melbourne	6
(Albania) Besart Berisha	Melbourne	5
(Australia) James Troisi	Melbourne	5
(Australia) Alex Brosque	Sydney	5
(Australia) Mark Bridge	Sydney	5
(Australia) David Carney	Sydney	5
(England) Joe Lolley	Sydney	4
(New Zealand) Shane Smeltz	Sydney	4
(Sweden) Ola Toivonen	Melbourne	4

- **BOLD** indicates player still playing for that club.

== Players who played for both clubs ==
As of 26 January 2024

Player	Nation	Melbourne Victory		Sydney FC		Total "Big Blues"		
Player	Nation	Years	Record	Years	Record	Apps	Goals	Record
Sebastian Ryall	(Australia)	2007–2009	2–1–0	2009–2018	7–13–6 (Note: Draws include 2017 A-League Grand Final Sydney won on penalties)	29 (3 / 26)	4 (0 / 4)	9–14–6
Mark Milligan	(Australia)	2012–2015; 2017–2018	4–5–3	2005–2008	1–3–3	19 (12 / 7)	1 (1 / 0)	5–8–6
Fabio	(Brazil)	2011–2012	0–2–1	2012–2013	0–0–2	5 (3 / 2)	1 (1 / 0)	0–2–3
Danny Vukovic	(Australia)	2015–2016	2–1–0	2016–2017	3–1–0	7 (3 / 4)	0	5–2–0
Terry Antonis	(Australia)	2018–2019	3–0–3	2010–2015	1–5–2	14 (6 / 8)	1 (1 / 0)	4–5–5
Mitch Austin	(Australia)	2016–2018	0–0–2	2019	0–0–0	2 (2 / 0)	1 (1 / 0)	0–0–2
Kosta Barbarouses	(New Zealand)	2013–2016; 2017–2019	7–4–5	2019–2022	6–0–1	23 (16 / 7)	11 (6 / 5)	13–4–6
James Donachie	(Australia)	2016–2018; 2019–2020	1–0–10	2021–2023	2–1–2	16 (11 / 5)	1 (0 / 1)	3–1–12
Elvis Kamsoba	(Burundi)	2019–2021	1–0–7	2021–2022	0–1–1	10 (8 / 2)	0 (0 / 0)	1–1–8
Joshua Brillante	(Australia)	2021–2023	2–1–1	2016–2019	8–1–3	16 (4 / 12)	0 (0 / 0)	10–2–4

Players in bold denote currently still active at either Melbourne Victory or Sydney FC

== Managed both teams ==
As of 11 May 2026

Player	Nation	Melbourne Victory						Sydney FC					
Player	Nation	Years	G	W	D	L	Win %	Years	G	W	D	L	Win %
Patrick Kisnorbo	(Australia)	2024	7	5	1	1	71.43	2026–present	16	8	5	3	50.00

== Played for one, managed the other ==
As of 12 May 2024

Manager	Played for				Managed						
Manager	Team	Span	League apps	League goals	Team	Span	G	W	D	L	Win %
Tony Popovic	Sydney FC	2007–2008	27	1	Melbourne Victory	2021–2024	92	39	26	27	42.39

== A-League Women ==
The Victory and City women's teams also compete in the A-League Women (formerly the W-League) and occasionally have 'double headers' where the men's teams play after the women's teams.

=== Results ===
==== Regular season matches ====
#	Date	Home team	Score	Away team	Goals (home)	Goals (away)	Venue	Attendance
1	1 November 2008	**Sydney**	**2–1**	Melbourne	Bolger (55), Khamis (82)	Groenewald (24)	Parramatta Stadium	No data
2	7 November 2009	Melbourne	**1–1**	Sydney	Sitch (62)	Ruyter-Hooley (90+5 o.g.)	Deakin Reserve	No data
3	13 November 2010	Melbourne	**1–4**	**Sydney**	Taylor (29 p.)	Simon (27, 37), Brogan (88), Polias (90)	Latrobe City Stadium	No data
4	29 October 2011	**Sydney**	**2–1**	Melbourne	Ledbrook (9), Rapinoe (83)	Taylor (63 p.)	Leichhardt Oval	No data
5	11 November 2012	Sydney	**1–2**	**Melbourne**	Kennedy (41)	Catley (8), Spiranovic (81)	Leichhardt Oval	No data
6	8 December 2012	Melbourne	**1–1**	Sydney	Ruyter-Hooley (27)	Foord (4)	Wembley Park	No data
7	10 November 2013	Melbourne	**1–5**	**Sydney**	Checker (3)	Khamis (18), Bolger (21, 73), Taylor (59), Kete (89)	Lakeside Stadium	No data
8	15 December 2013	Sydney	**1–1**	Melbourne	Kete (33)	Fishlock (81)	Allianz Stadium	No data
9	6 October 2014	Sydney	**1–1**	Melbourne	Spencer (60)	Simon (86)	Lambert Park	733
10	27 December 2015	Melbourne	**1–2**	**Sydney**	Barbieri (46)	Khamis (10), Spencer (22)	AAMI Park	No data
11	20 November 2016	Melbourne	**1–2**	**Sydney**	Dowie (83)	Kennedy (17), Siemsen (35)	Lakeside Stadium	339
12	2 December 2017	**Sydney**	**2–0**	Melbourne	Ibini (3), De Vanna (57)	—	Cromer Park	1,644
13	26 January 2018	Melbourne	**1–2**	**Sydney**	Privitelli (49)	Ray (4), Logarzo (30)	AAMI Park	6,045
14	24 November 2018	Sydney	**2–3**	**Melbourne**	Logarzo (39), Kennedy (83)	Dowie (5, 45+1 p., 51)	Netstrata Jubilee Stadium	5,540
15	27 January 2019	Melbourne	**2–2**	Sydney	Gielnik (68), Dowie (78)	Kennedy (35), Logarzo (71)	Lakeside Stadium	784
16	17 November 2019	**Sydney**	**3–0**	Melbourne	Siemsen (4, 22), Evans (90+2)	—	Netstrata Jubilee Stadium	3,219
17	29 February 2020	**Melbourne**	**3–1**	Sydney	Jackson (25), Jenkins (49, 78)	Tobin (90)	Marvel Stadium	3,310
18	4 April 2021	**Sydney**	**2–1**	Melbourne	Polias (29), Ibini (73 p.)	Cooney-Cross (90+6)	Cromer Park	1,111
19	16 February 2022	Melbourne	**2–2**	Sydney	Privitelli (68), Zimmerman (90+2)	Siemsen (50), Ibini (60)	City Vista Recreation Reserve	814
20	26 November 2022	**Sydney**	**2–0**	Melbourne	Haley (41), Morrison (48 o.g.)	—	Cromer Park	1,339
21	26 January 2023	Melbourne	**3–6**	**Sydney**	Madsen (42), Privitelli (48), Markovski (88 p.)	Ibini-Isei (24, 36, 60), Hawkesby (30), Vine (48), Haley (50)	AAMI Park	1,307
22	26 January 2024	Melbourne	**1–1**	Sydney	Lowe (21 p.)	Caspers (7)	AAMI Park	4,522
23	31 March 2024	Sydney	**0–4**	**Melbourne**	—	Murphy (17), Lowe (38 p.), Gielnik (64), Chidiac (90+6)	Leichhardt Oval	4,576
24	28 December 2024	Sydney	**0–1**	**Melbourne**	—	Jancevski (14 p.)	Allianz Stadium	5,630
25	24 January 2025	**Melbourne**	**2–0**	Sydney	Jancevski (4), Furphy (77)	—	AAMI Park	2,494
26	25 January 2026	Sydney	**0–0**	Melbourne	—	—	Home of The Matildas	1,056
27	28 March 2026	**Sydney**	**2–1**	Melbourne	Tanner (31, 49)	Lowe (23)	Leichhardt Oval	2,107
28	23 January 2027	Sydney	–	Melbourne				
29	10 April 2027	Melbourne	–	Sydney			Melbourne Rectangular Stadium	

Women's league home record
Home team	Matches	Wins	Draws	Losses
**Sydney**	14	7	3	4
**Melbourne**	13	2	5	6

Overall women's league head-to-head record
Matches	Sydney FC wins	Melbourne Victory wins	Draws
27	13	6	8

==== Finals series matches ====
#	Date	Round	Home team	Score	Away team	Goals (home)	Goals (away)	Venue	Attendance
1	6 February 2011	Semi-final	**Sydney**	**5–1**	Melbourne	Khamis (26, 75), Uzunlar (38 p.), Simon (74), Bolger (88)	Catley (30)	Parramatta Stadium	912
2	27 January 2013	Grand Final	Melbourne	**1–3**	**Sydney**	Larsson (41)	Bolger (25), Kerr (48), Simon (85 p.)	AAMI Park	4,181
3	16 February 2014	Semi-final	Sydney	**2–3**	**Melbourne**	Kerr (45+1), Khamis (52)	Fishlock (22), Humble (36), Barnes (71)	Jubilee Oval	No data
4	14 March 2020	Semi-final	Melbourne	**0–1**	**Sydney**	—	Latsko (14)	Epping Stadium	704
5	11 April 2021	Grand Final	Sydney	**0–1** **(a.e.t.)**	**Melbourne**	—	Cooney-Cross (120)	Netstrata Jubilee Stadium	4,619
6	27 March 2022	Grand Final	Sydney	**1–2**	**Melbourne**	Vine (66)	Jackson (49), Zimmerman (64)	Netstrata Jubilee Stadium	5,027
7	22 April 2023	Preliminary Final	**Sydney**	**1–0**	Melbourne	Haley (89)	—	Allianz Stadium	1,630

Women's finals home record
Home team	Matches	Wins	Draws	Losses
**Sydney**	5	2	0	3
**Melbourne**	2	0	0	2

Overall women's finals head-to-head record
Matches	Sydney FC wins	Melbourne Victory wins	Draws
7	4	3	0

=== Head-to-head ===
As of 2 April 2026

==== Matches summary ====
Competition	Played	Melbourne Victory wins	Draws	Sydney FC wins
A-League Women regular season	27	6	8	**13**
A-League Women finals (except Grand Finals)	4	1	0	**3**
A-League Women Grand Finals	3	**2**	0	1
Total	34	9	8	17

==== Honours summary ====
Title	Melbourne Victory	Sydney FC
A-League Women Premiership	1	5
A-League Women Championship	3	5
Total	4	10

== Combined honours ==
Title	Melbourne Victory	Sydney FC
A-League Men Premiership	3	4
A-League Men Championship	4	5
Australia Cup	2	2
Men's total	9	11
A-League Women Premiership	1	5
A-League Women Championship	3	5
Women's total	4	10
Total	13	21

== See also ==
- Soccer in Australia
- List of association football club rivalries by country
