= 2018 A-League finals series =

A-League finals series
- Season: 2017–18
- Dates: 3–19 May 2019
- Champions: Melbourne Victory FC
- Matches: 5
- Goals: 14 (2.8 per match)
- Biggest home win: Melbourne City 2–0 Brisbane Roar (Elimination Finals, 20 April 2018)
- Biggest away win: Sydney FC 2–3 Melbourne Victory (Semi Final, 28 April 2018); Newcastle Jets 0–1 Melbourne Victory (Grand Final, 5 May 2018)
- Highest scoring: Sydney FC 2–3 Melbourne Victory (Semi Final, 28 April 2018)
- Highest attendance: 29,410; Newcastle Jets 0–1 Melbourne Victory (Grand Final, 5 May 2018)
- Lowest attendance: 7,757; Melbourne City 2–0 Brisbane Roar}} (Elimination Finals, 20 April 2018)
- Total attendance: 89,575
- Average attendance: 17,915
- All statistics correct as of 17 August 2024.

The 2018 A-League finals series was the 13th annual edition of the A-League finals series, the playoffs tournament staged to determine the champion of the 2018–19 A-League season. The series was played over three weeks culminating in the 2018 A-League Grand Final, where Melbourne Victory won a fourth championship 1–0 against Newcastle Jets.

== Qualification ==
Pos	Team	Pld	W	D	L	GF	GA	GD	Pts	Qualification
1	Sydney FC	27	20	4	3	64	22	+42	64	Qualification for 2019 AFC Champions League group stage and Finals series
2	Newcastle Jets	27	15	5	7	57	37	+20	50	Qualification for 2019 AFC Champions League second preliminary round and Finals series
3	Melbourne City	27	13	4	10	41	33	+8	43	Qualification for Finals series
4	Melbourne Victory (C)	27	12	5	10	43	37	+6	41	Qualification for 2019 AFC Champions League group stage and Finals series
5	Adelaide United	27	11	6	10	36	38	−2	39	Qualification for Finals series
6	Brisbane Roar	27	10	5	12	33	40	−7	35	Qualification for Finals series
7	Western Sydney Wanderers	27	8	9	10	38	47	−9	33	
8	Perth Glory	27	10	2	15	37	50	−13	32	
9	Wellington Phoenix (Note: Wellington Phoenix cannot qualify for the AFC Champions League as they are not recognised as an AFC club.)	27	5	6	16	31	55	−24	21	
10	Central Coast Mariners	27	4	8	15	28	49	−21	20	

Source: A-Leagues
Rules for classification: 1) points; 2) goal difference; 3) number of goals scored.
(C) Champions

== Venues ==
Newcastle		2018 A-League finals series is located in Australia
McDonald Jones Stadium		2018 A-League finals series is located in Australia
Capacity: 30,000		2018 A-League finals series is located in Australia
Sydney	Melbourne	2018 A-League finals series is located in Australia
Allianz Stadium	AAMI Park	2018 A-League finals series is located in Australia
Capacity: 45,000	Capacity: 30,050	2018 A-League finals series is located in Australia

== Matches ==
The system used for the 2019 A-League finals series is the modified top-six play-offs by the A-Leagues. The top two teams enter the two-legged semi-finals receiving the bye for the elimination-finals in which the teams from third placed to sixth place enter the elimination-finals with "third against sixth" and "fourth against fifth". Losers for the elimination-finals are eliminated, and winners qualify for the semi-finals.

First placed team in the semi-finals plays the lowest ranked elimination-final winning team and second placed team in the semi-finals plays the highest ranked elimination-final winner. Home advantage goes to the team with the higher ladder position.

Elimination-finals
Melbourne Victory	2
Adelaide United	1
Melbourne City	2
Brisbane Roar	0

Semi-finals
Sydney FC	2
Melbourne Victory (a.e.t.)	3
Newcastle Jets	2
Melbourne City	1

Grand Final
Newcastle Jets	0
Melbourne Victory	1

=== Elimination Finals ===
The first elimination final took place on 20 April 2018 between third placed Melbourne City and sixth placed Brisbane Roar at AAMI Park in Melbourne. Melbourne City would win 2–0 with goals from Stefan Mauk in the 59th minute and Nick Fitzgerald in the 90+1st minute.

20 April 2018 Elimination Final	Melbourne City	2−0	Brisbane Roar	Melbourne
19:50 AEST	Mauk 59'; Fitzgerald 90+1'	Report		Stadium: AAMI Park; Attendance: 7,757; Referee: Jarred Gillett

The second elimination final was played on 22 April 2018 between Melbourne Victory who placed fourth and Adelaide United who placed fifth at AAMI Park. Before this during The 2017–18 regular season Melbourne Victory and Adelaide United met three times, each team won one game each and had a draw. Adelaide would open the score line with a goal in the 57th minute by Nikola Mileusnic. Victory then came back with a goal in the 63rd minute by Leroy George and a final goal by Besart Berisha in the 89th minute to seal the win for Victory.

22 April 2018 Elimination Final	Melbourne Victory	2−1	Adelaide United	Melbourne
18:00 AEST	George 63'; Berisha 89'	Report	Mileusnic 57'	Stadium: AAMI Park; Attendance: 15,502; Referee: Chris Beath

=== Semi-finals ===
The first semi final took place between Newcastle Jets and Melbourne City on 27 April 2018 at McDonald Jones Stadium. an early own-goal in the 13th minute for Melbourne City by Nikolai Topor-Stanley. Newcastle jets would come back with a stunner scorpion kick by Riley McGree in the 56th minute and a 74th minute winner by Jason Hoffman. Newcastle's win would confirm them to their second grand final in their history and their first since 2008.

27 April 2018 Semi Final	Newcastle Jets	2−1	Melbourne City	Newcastle
19:50 AEST	McGree 56'; Hoffman 74'	Report	Topor-Stanley 13' (o.g.)	Stadium: McDonald Jones Stadium; Attendance: 19,131; Referee: Shaun Evans

Sydney FC would play Melbourne Victory on 28 April 2018 at Allianz Stadium. Stefan Nigro would score an own goal in the 24th minute. Victory would come back with a goal in the 31st minute by Kosta Barbarouses and another goal in the 47th minute by James Troisi. In the 90+5th minute Terry Antonis scored an own goal to make the game 2-2. The game would go to extra time and in the 117th minute Terry Antonis would redeem himself by scoring the winner for Melbourne Victory to qualify for the grand final.

28 April 2018 Semi Final	Sydney FC	2–3 (a.e.t.)	Melbourne Victory	Sydney
19:50 AEST	Nigro 24' (o.g.); Antonis 90+5' (o.g.)	Report	Barbarouses 31'; Troisi 47'; Antonis 117'	Stadium: Allianz Stadium; Attendance: 17,775; Referee: Kurt Ams

=== Grand Final ===
The 2018 A-League Grand Final was the thirteenth A-League Grand Final, played on 5 May 2018. The match took place at McDonald Jones Stadium, with Newcastle Jets hosting Melbourne Victory, the first A-League grand final held outside a metropolitan city.

Kosta Barbarouses scored the only goal of the game, in the 9th minute. It was a controversial goal, as replays showed that there was an offside offence in the lead up to the goal, but the Video Assistant Referee system had gone down for technical reasons and the goal was allowed to stand. This was the only goal of the night and Melbourne Victory would win their fourth a-league championship.

5 May 2018	Newcastle Jets	0−1	Melbourne Victory	Newcastle
19:50 AEST		Report	Barbarouses 9'	Stadium: McDonald Jones Stadium; Attendance: 29,410; Referee: Jarred Gillett

== See also ==
- 2017–18 A-League
- 2018 A-League Grand final
- List of A-League honours
