= List of Melbourne Victory FC records and statistics =

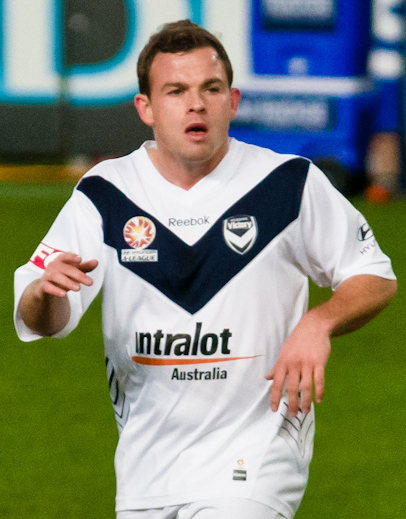
Leigh Broxham has the record for the most appearances for the Victory.

Melbourne Victory Football Club is an Australian professional association football club based at the Melbourne Rectangular Stadium. The club was formed in 2004.

The list encompasses the honours won by Melbourne Victory, records set by the club, their managers and their players. The player records section itemises the club's leading goalscorers and those who have made most appearances in first-team competitions. It also records the highest transfer fees paid and received by the club. Attendance records at Olympic Park, Docklands Stadium and Melbourne Rectangular Stadium, the club's present home, are also included.

Melbourne Victory have won 7 top-flight titles, and have two Australia Cups. The club's record appearance maker is Leigh Broxham, who has currently made 444 appearances from 2005 to the present day. Archie Thompson is Melbourne Victory's record goalscorer, scoring 97 goals in total.

All figures are correct as of 16 December 2023

== Honours and achievements ==
=== Domestic ===
- A-League Men Premiership

Winners (3): 2006–07, 2008–09, 2014–15
Runners-up (3): 2009–10, 2016–17, 2021–22

- A-League Men Championship

Winners (4): 2007, 2009, 2015, 2018
Runners-up (2): 2010, 2017

- Australia Cup

Winners (2): 2015, 2021

- A-League Pre-Season Challenge Cup

Winners (1): 2008

== Player records ==
=== Appearances ===
- Most A-League Men appearances: Leigh Broxham, 382
- Most national cup appearances: Leigh Broxham, 27
- Most AFC Champions League appearances: Leigh Broxham, 47
- Youngest first-team player: Birkan Kirdar, 16 years, 70 days (against Shanghai SIPG, AFC Champions League group stage, 18 April 2018)
- Oldest first-team player: Kevin Muscat, 37 years, 277 days (against Tianjin TEDA, AFC Champions League group stage, 20 April 2011)
- Most consecutive appearances: Rodrigo Vargas, 54 (from 16 November 2007 to 18 October 2009)

==== Most appearances ====
Competitive matches only, includes appearances as substitute. Numbers in brackets indicate goals scored.

#	Name	Years	A-League Men		National Cup^{a}	Asia	Other^{b}	Total
#	Name	Years	Regular season	Finals series	National Cup^{a}	Asia	Other^{b}	Total
1	(Australia) Leigh Broxham	2005–	363 (4)	19 (1)	27 (0)	47 (2)	1 (0)	457 (7)
2	(Australia) Archie Thompson	2005–2016	209 (80)	15 (10)	15 (5)	23 (2)	0 (0)	262 (97)
3	(Australia) Adrian Leijer	2005–2007; 2009–2015	167 (8)	9 (1)	14 (0)	15 (1)	1 (0)	205 (8)
4	(Australia) Jason Geria	2013–2018; 2021–	144 (2)	11 (0)	13 (1)	17 (0)	0 (0)	185 (3)
5	(Australia) Rodrigo Vargas	2006–2012	129 (6)	10 (0)	14 (0)	14 (2)	0 (0)	167 (8)
6	(New Zealand) Kosta Barbarouses	2013–2016; 2017–2019	117 (36)	10 (5)	11 (5)	23 (5)	0 (0)	161 (51)
7	(Australia) Kevin Muscat	2005–2011	113 (28)	9 (0)	13 (1)	16 (6)	0 (0)	151 (35)
7	(Australia) Lawrence Thomas	2005–2011	112 (0)	10 (0)	8 (0)	21 (0)	0 (0)	151 (0)
9	(Australia) Danny Allsopp	2005–2011	111 (39)	7 (3)	19 (4)	11 (4)	1 (0)	149 (50)
10	(Costa Rica) Carlos Hernández	2005–2011	114 (33)	7 (3)	7 (1)	13 (2)	0 (0)	141 (39)

a. Includes the A-League Pre-Season Challenge Cup and Australia Cup
b. Includes goals and appearances (including those as a substitute) in the 2005 Australian Club World Championship Qualifying Tournament.

=== Goalscorers ===
- Most league goals in a season: Besart Berisha, 21 goals in the A-League, 2016–17
- Youngest goalscorer: Christopher Cristaldo, 18 years, 67 days (against Perth Glory, A-League, 23 March 2013)
- Oldest goalscorer: Kevin Muscat, 37 years, 256 days (against Tianjin TEDA, AFC Champions League group stage, 20 April 2011)
- Most consecutive goalscoring appearances: Besart Berisha, 6 (from 26 April 2015 to 22 September 2015)

==== Top goalscorers ====
Competitive matches only. Numbers in brackets indicate appearances made.

#	Name	Years	A-League Men		National Cup^{a}	Asia	Other^{b}	Total
#	Name	Years	Regular season	Finals series	National Cup^{a}	Asia	Other^{b}	Total
1	(Australia) Archie Thompson	2005–2016	80 (209)	10 (15)	5 (15)	2 (23)	0 (0)	97 (262)
2	(Kosovo) Besart Berisha	2014–2018	62 (95)	6 (8)	12 (14)	6 (20)	0 (0)	86 (137)
3	(New Zealand) Kosta Barbarouses	2013–2016; 2017–2019	36 (117)	5 (10)	5 (11)	5 (23)	0 (0)	51 (161)
4	(Australia) Danny Allsopp	2005–2009; 2011–2012	39 (111)	3 (7)	4 (19)	4 (11)	0 (1)	50 (149)
5	(New Zealand) Marco Rojas	2011–2013; 2016–2017; 2020–2022	39 (113)	0 (6)	1 (5)	1 (8)	0 (0)	41 (132)
6	(Costa Rica) Carlos Hernández	2007–2009; 2009–2012	33 (114)	3 (7)	1 (7)	2 (13)	0 (0)	39 (141)
7	(Australia) Kevin Muscat	2005–2011	28 (113)	0 (9)	1 (13)	6 (16)	0 (0)	35 (151)
8	(Australia) James Troisi	2013–2014; 2016–2019	26 (98)	1 (7)	2 (6)	3 (15)	0 (0)	32 (126)
9	(Sweden) Ola Toivonen	2018–2020	23 (38)	2 (2)	0 (1)	4 (8)	0 (0)	29 (49)
10	(Brazil) Guilherme Finkler	2012–2016	19 (87)	1 (5)	3 (7)	0 (0)	0 (0)	23 (99)

a. Includes the A-League Pre-Season Challenge Cup and Australia Cup
b. Includes goals and appearances (including those as a substitute) in the 2005 Australian Club World Championship Qualifying Tournament.

=== Award winners ===
Joe Marston Medal

Year	Player	Opponent
2007	(Australia) Archie Thompson	Adelaide United
2009	(Australia) Tom Pondeljak	Adelaide United
2015	(Australia) Mark Milligan	Sydney FC
2017	(North Macedonia) Daniel Georgievski	Sydney FC
2018	(Australia) Lawrence Thomas	Newcastle Jets

Johnny Warren Medal

Year	Player
2009–10	(Costa Rica) Carlos Hernandez
2012–13	(New Zealand) Marco Rojas
2021–22	(Australia) Jake Brimmer

=== Transfers ===
==== Record transfer fees received ====
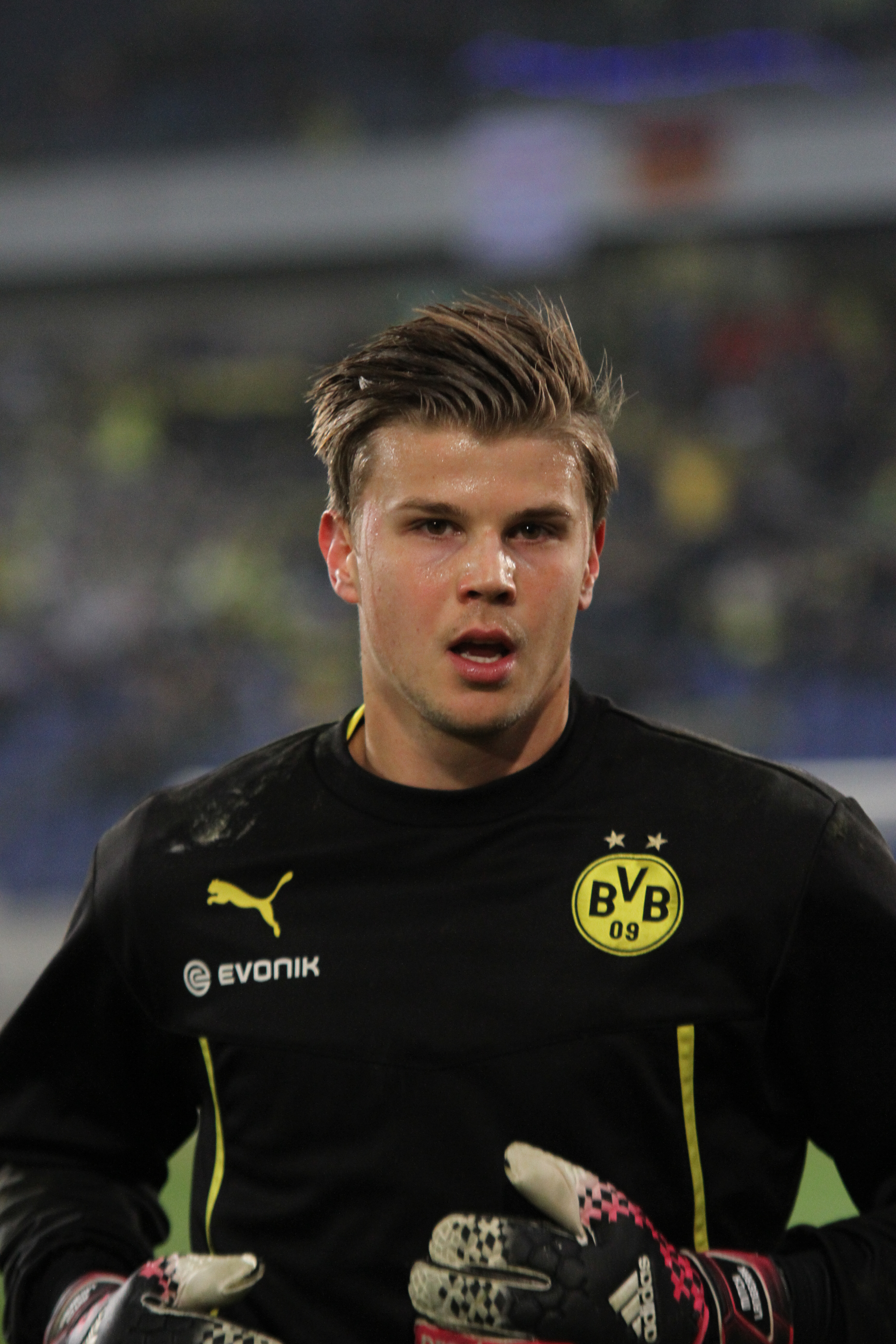
Mitchell Langerak, the club's current record signing.

#	Fee	Received from	For	Date	Notes	Ref
1	$1.3m	Borussia Dortmund	Mitchell Langerak	2009	A further $500k in add-ons	
2	$1m	Al-Ahli	Mark Milligan	28 January 2018		
3	$900k	Baniyas Club	Mark Milligan	2015		
4	$800k	JEF United Chiba	Jason Geria	3 March 2018		

== Managerial records ==
- First full-time manager: Ernie Merrick managed Melbourne Victory from December 2004 to March 2011.
- Longest serving manager: Ernie Merrick – 6 years, 82 days (21 December 2004 to 13 March 2011)
- Shortest serving manager: Kevin Muscat – 2 days (6 January 2012 – 8 January 2012)
- Shortest serving manager excluding caretaker: Jim Magilton – 85 days (8 January 2012 – 2 April 2012)
- Highest win percentage: Kevin Muscat (caretaker), 100.00%
- Highest win percentage excluding caretaker: Kevin Muscat, 49.07%
- Lowest win percentage: Jim Magilton, 16.67%

== Club records ==
=== Matches ===
==== Firsts ====
- First match: Adelaide United 0–0 (4–1 pen.) Melbourne Victory, 2005 Australian Club World Championship Qualifying Tournament, 7 May 2005
- First A-League Men match: Sydney FC 1–1 Melbourne Victory, 28 August 2005
- First national cup match: Newcastle Jets 1–1 Melbourne Victory, A-League Pre-Season Challenge Cup, 22 July 2005
- First Asian match: Melbourne Victory 2–0 Chunham Dragons, AFC Champions League group stage, 12 March 2008
- First home match at Olympic Park Stadium: Melbourne Victory 1–0 Perth Glory, A-League Pre-Season Challenge Cup, 30 July 2005
- First home match at Marvel Stadium: Melbourne Victory 1–2 Queensland Roar, A-League, 12 January 2007
- First home match at AAMI Park: Melbourne Victory 0–2 Perth Glory, A-League, 14 August 2010

==== Record wins ====
- Record A-League Men win: 6–0 against Adelaide United, Grand Final, 18 February 2007
- Record national cup win:
  - 6–0 against Tuggeranong United, FFA Cup Round of 16, 16 September 2014
  - 6–0 against Balmain Tigers, FFA Cup Round of 32, 4 August 2015
- Record Asian win: 5–0 against Bali United, AFC Champions League preliminary round 2, 21 January 2020

==== Record defeats ====
- Record A-League Men defeat: 0–7 against Melbourne City, 17 April 2021
- Record national cup defeat: 0–3 against Adelaide United, FFA Cup Round of 16, 23 August 2017
- Record Asian defeat:
  - 0–4 against Kawasaki Frontale, AFC Champions League group stage, 23 March 2010
  - 1–5 against Gamba Osaka, AFC Champions League group stage, 1 March 2011
  - 2–6 against Ulsan Hyundai, AFC Champions League group stage, 4 April 2018
  - 0–4 against Guangzhou Evergrande, AFC Champions League group stage, 10 April 2019
  - 0–4 against Daegu FC, AFC Champions League group stage, 8 May 2019

==== Record consecutive results ====
- Record consecutive wins: 10, from 5 August 2006 to 8 October 2006
- Record consecutive defeats: 5
  - from 7 March 2020 to 3 August 2020
  - from 6 May 2021 to 23 May 2021
- Record consecutive matches without a defeat: 13, from 19 March 2022 to 17 May 2022
- Record consecutive league matches without a defeat: 17, from 19 February 2022 to 8 October 2022
- Record consecutive matches without a win: 10, from 15 July 2007 to 21 September 2007
- Record consecutive matches without conceding a goal: 5, from 16 January 2009 to 28 February 2009
- Record consecutive matches without scoring a goal: 4, from 28 October 2005 to 18 November 2005

=== Goals ===
- Most A-League Men goals scored in a season: 56 in 27 matches, 2014–15
- Fewest A-League Men goals scored in a season: 26 in 21 matches, 2005–06
- Most A-League Men goals conceded in a season: 60 in 26 matches, 2020–21
- Fewest A-League Men goals conceded in a season: 20 in 21 matches, 2006–07

=== Points ===
- Most points in an A-League Men season: 53 in 27 matches, 2014–15
- Fewest points in an A-League Men season: 19 in 26 matches, 2020–21

=== Attendances ===
This section applies to attendances at Olympic Park, Docklands Stadium, where Melbourne Victory played their home matches from 2007 to 2021, and AAMI Park, the club's present home.

- Highest attendance at Olympic Park: 18,206 against Sydney FC, A-League, 16 October 2005
- Lowest attendance at Olympic Park: 2,215 against Perth Glory, A-League Pre-Season Challenge Cup, 18 August 2006
- Highest attendance at Docklands Stadium: 55,436 against Adelaide United, A-League Grand Final, 18 February 2007
- Lowest attendance at Docklands Stadium: 3,235 against Western Sydney Wanderers, A-League, 23 April 2021
- Highest attendance at AAMI Park: 29,843 against Sydney FC, A-League Grand Final, 17 May 2015
- Lowest attendance at AAMI Park: 3,424 against Wellington Phoenix, A-League, 24 February 2021
