= 2018 A-League Grand Final =

- Event: 2017–18 A-League
| Newcastle Jets | Melbourne Victory |
| 0 | 1 |
- Date: 5 May 2018
- Venue: McDonald Jones Stadium, Newcastle
- Man of the Match: Lawrence Thomas
- Referee: Jarred Gillett
- Attendance: 29,410

The 2018 A-League Grand Final was the thirteenth A-League Grand Final, played on 5 May 2018. The match took place at McDonald Jones Stadium, with Newcastle Jets hosting Melbourne Victory, the first A-League grand final held outside a capital city.

Kosta Barbarouses scored the only goal of the game, in the 9th minute. It was a controversial goal, as replays showed that there was an offside offence in the lead up to the goal, but the Video Assistant Referee system had gone down for technical reasons and the goal was allowed to stand.

== Teams ==
In the following table, finals until 2004 were in the National Soccer League era, since 2006 were in the A-League era.

| Team | Previous final appearances (bold indicates winners) |
|---|---|
| Newcastle Jets | 1 (**2008**) |
| Melbourne Victory | 5 (**2007**, **2009**, 2010, **2015**, 2017) |

== Records ==
Kosta Barbarouses's 9th-minute goal was the fastest ever goal scored in an A-League Grand Final.

Kosta Barbarouses's 9th-minute goal was the equal 3rd fastest goal ever scored in any previous National Soccer League Grand Final & A-League Grand Final history behind John Anastasiadis in 1998 for South Melbourne against Carlton at Olympic Park, Mile Sterjovski in 1999 for Sydney United against South Melbourne at Olympic Park, and Mark Koussas in 1984 for Sydney Olympic against South Melbourne at Olympic Park.

Melbourne Victory became the first ever team to qualify for the A-League Grand Final from outside the top 3. With their win, the Victory became the first team in A-League history to win 4 championships, and the first team in A-League history to win the Championship from outside the top 2.

Melbourne Victory also became the first team to win the championship from outside the top 2 positions after regular season since Adelaide City won the 1994 NSL Grand Final from 5th spot on the ladder and Melbourne Victory are only just the 9th team in history to win an away from home Grand Final in 34-year history of season deciders in NSL & A-League history and were just only the 7th team in history to win the NSL Grand Final & A-League Grand Final from outside the top 2 positions after regular season.

Melbourne Victory equal the record for most NSL & A-League championships on four titles along with Hakoah Sydney City (1977, 1980, 1981, 1982), Marconi Stallions (1979, 1988, 1989, 1993), and South Melbourne (1984, 1991, 1998, 1999).

The crowd of 29,410 was Newcastle's biggest ever home attendance.

== Video assistant referee (VAR) controversy ==
Kosta Barbarouses's goal in the 9th minute of the game came about via a header from James Donachie, however Donachie was offside when Leroy George took the free kick which Donachie passed to Barbarouses. The game's video assistant referee (VAR) system failed to detect Donachie's offside position as its video feed had failed in the thirty seconds leading up to the goal. By the time the system was restored, the game had resumed, meaning the decision to allow the goal stood. The Football Federation Australia later acknowledged the technical issues, but offered no real apology to the Newcastle team or fans. It was discovered that the VAR system had lost access to the camera views which would have allowed for the offside ruling. The incident only happened once throughout the season. FFA's Head of Hyundai A-League and Westfield W-League, Greg O'Rourke, stated "This is important not just for the Hyundai A-League but for other leagues around the world and for the 2018 FIFA World Cup in Russia at which VAR will be used for the first time."

== Roy O'Donovan ==
Roy O'Donovan was immediately issued a red card, and later on a 10 game ban, for the high kick he delivered against Victory goal keeper Lawrence Thomas's face in the 93rd minute of the final.

Following the 3 days of deliberation after the hearing, the Football Federation Australia's disciplinary and ethics committee decided on the harsh punishment for the Newcastle striker. It is the second-biggest ban ever given in the A-League, over the 8-game ban he had been given two years earlier for headbutting Wellington's Manny Muscat. O'Donovan's representation agreed that his actions were "careless" but also argued that he had been playing the ball in desperation to score an equaliser in the game's final seconds. Arguments which the disciplinary committee dismissed, insisting that his intention was clearly to injure Thomas as he was rushing for the ball. Ivan Griscti, FIFA's counsel, stated that "it does appear that the player is looking at the goalkeeper". O'Donovan attempted to plead his case via video link, stating that his vision at the time was blurred having been elbowed in the face from Besart Berisha only moments before, and that he had not realized that he had made contact with Thomas' head.

== Route to the final ==
| Pos | Team | Pts |
|---|---|---|
| 1 | Sydney FC | 64 |
| 2 | Newcastle Jets | 50 |
| 3 | Melbourne City | 43 |
| 4 | Melbourne Victory | 41 |
| 5 | Adelaide United | 39 |
| 6 | Brisbane Roar | 35 |

Elimination-finals
**Melbourne Victory** | 2
Adelaide United | 1
**Melbourne City** | 2
Brisbane Roar | 0

Semi-finals
Sydney FC | 2
**Melbourne Victory** | 3
**Newcastle Jets** | 2
Melbourne City | 1

Grand Final
Newcastle Jets | 0
**Melbourne Victory** | **1**

== Match ==
=== Details ===
5 May 2018
19:50 AEST

| Newcastle Jets | 0–1 | Melbourne Victory |
|---|---|---|
| | Reports | Barbarouses 9' |

McDonald Jones Stadium, Newcastle
Attendance: 29,410
Referee: Jarred Gillett

| **Newcastle Jets** | **Melbourne Victory** |

| GK | 20 | (New Zealand) Glen Moss |
| RB | 17 | (North Macedonia) Daniel Georgievski | (yellow card) 51' | (substituted off) 74' |
| CB | 4 | (Australia) Nigel Boogaard |
| CB | 44 | (Australia) Nikolai Topor-Stanley |
| LB | 18 | (Australia) John Koutroumbis |
| CM | 27 | (Australia) Riley McGree |
| CM | 6 | (Australia) Steven Ugarkovic |
| CM | 8 | (Venezuela) Ronald Vargas | | (substituted off) 65' |
| RW | 3 | (Australia) Jason Hoffman | (yellow card) 90+1' |
| CF | 9 | (Republic of Ireland) Roy O'Donovan | (red card) 90+3' |
| LW | 7 | (Australia) Dimitri Petratos |
Substitutes:
| GK | 30 | (Australia) Ivan Necevski |
| DF | 22 | (Australia) Lachlan Jackson |
| DF | 16 | (Australia) Nick Cowburn |
| FW | 11 | (Argentina) Patito Rodríguez | | (substituted on) 74' |
| FW | 24 | (Australia) Joe Champness | | (substituted on) 65' |
Manager: (Scotland) Ernie Merrick

| GK | 20 | (Australia) Lawrence Thomas |
| RB | 22 | (Australia) Stefan Nigro | | (substituted off) 77' |
| CB | 17 | (Australia) James Donachie |
| CB | 14 | (Australia) Thomas Deng |
| LB | 6 | (Australia) Leigh Broxham |
| DM | 21 | (Australia) Carl Valeri (c) |
| DM | 24 | (Australia) Terry Antonis |
| RM | 9 | (New Zealand) Kosta Barbarouses |
| AM | 10 | (Australia) James Troisi |
| LM | 41 | (Netherlands) Leroy George |
| CF | 8 | (Kosovo) Besart Berisha |
Substitutes:
| GK | 1 | (Australia) Matt Acton |
| MF | 16 | (Australia) Joshua Hope |
| MF | 18 | (Argentina) Matías Sánchez | (yellow card) 90+2' | (substituted on) 77' |
| FW | 23 | (New Zealand) Jai Ingham |
| FW | 7 | (South Sudan) Kenny Athiu |
Manager: (Australia) Kevin Muscat

Joe Marston Medal:
Lawrence Thomas

Assistant referees:
Matthew Cream
Paul Cetrangolo
Fourth official:
Kurt Ams

**Match rules**

- 90 minutes.
- 30 minutes of extra time if necessary.
- Penalty shoot-out if scores still level.
- Five named substitutes.
- Maximum of three substitutions.

A-League
2018 Champions

**Melbourne Victory**
**Fourth Title**

=== Statistics ===
Overall statistics
| | Newcastle Jets | Melbourne Victory |
|---|---|---|
| Goals scored | 0 | 1 |
| Total shots | 14 | 7 |
| Shots on target | 4 | 2 |
| Ball possession | 58.3% | 41.7% |
| Corner kicks | 4 | 5 |
| Fouls Conceded | 12 | 17 |
| Offsides | 1 | 2 |
| Yellow cards | 2 | 1 |
| Red cards | 1 | 0 |

== Broadcasting ==
The Grand Final was broadcast live throughout Australia on Fox Sports and Network Ten.

== See also ==
- 2017–18 A-League
- 2018 A-League finals series
- List of A-League honours
