= 2019 A-League finals series =

A-League finals series
- Season: 2018–19
- Dates: 3–19 May 2019
- Champions: Sydney FC
- Matches: 5
- Goals: 18 (3.6 per match)
- Top goalscorer: Diego Castro; Adam Le Fondre; Ola Toivonen (2 goals each)
- Biggest home win: Sydney FC 6–1 Melbourne Victory (Semi-finals, 12 May 2019)
- Highest scoring: Sydney FC 6–1 Melbourne Victory (Semi-finals, 12 May 2019)
- Highest attendance: 56,371; Perth Glory 0–0 Sydney FC (Grand Final, 19 May 2019)
- Lowest attendance: 12,141; Sydney FC 6–1 Melbourne Victory (Semi-finals, 12 May 2019)
- Total attendance: 115,622
- Average attendance: 23,124

The 2019 A-League finals series was the 14th annual edition of the A-League finals series, the playoffs tournament staged to determine the champion of the 2018–19 A-League season. The series was played over three weeks culminating in the 2019 A-League Grand Final, where Sydney FC won a fourth championship 4–1 on penalties after a 0–0 draw against Perth Glory.

== Qualification ==
Pos	Team	Pld	W	D	L	GF	GA	GD	Pts	Qualification
1	Perth Glory	27	18	6	3	56	23	+33	60	Qualification for 2020 AFC Champions League group stage and Finals series (Note: The top two teams enter the Finals series at the semi-finals, while the teams ranked third to sixth enter the Finals series at the elimination-finals.)
2	Sydney FC (C)	27	16	4	7	43	29	+14	52	Qualification for 2020 AFC Champions League group stage and Finals series
3	Melbourne Victory	27	15	5	7	50	32	+18	50	Qualification for 2020 AFC Champions League preliminary round 2 and Finals series
4	Adelaide United	27	12	8	7	37	32	+5	44	Qualification for Finals series
5	Melbourne City	27	11	7	9	39	32	+7	40	Qualification for Finals series
6	Wellington Phoenix (Note: Wellington Phoenix cannot qualify for the AFC Champions League as they are not recognised as an AFC club.)	27	11	7	9	46	43	+3	40	Qualification for Finals series
7	Newcastle Jets	27	10	5	12	40	36	+4	35	
8	Western Sydney Wanderers	27	6	6	15	42	54	−12	24	
9	Brisbane Roar	27	4	6	17	38	71	−33	18	
10	Central Coast Mariners	27	3	4	20	31	70	−39	13	

Source: A-Leagues
Rules for classification: 1) points; 2) goal difference; 3) number of goals scored.
(C) Champions

== Venues ==
Perth		2019 A-League finals series is located in Australia	Melbourne
Optus Stadium	HBF Park	2019 A-League finals series is located in Australia	AAMI Park
Capacity: 61,266	Capacity: 20,050	2019 A-League finals series is located in Australia	Capacity: 30,050
Sydney		2019 A-League finals series is located in Australia	Adelaide
Netstrata Jubilee Stadium		2019 A-League finals series is located in Australia	Coopers Stadium
Capacity: 20,500		2019 A-League finals series is located in Australia	Capacity: 16,500

== Matches ==
The system used for the 2019 A-League finals series is the modified top-six play-offs by the A-Leagues. The top two teams enter the two-legged semi-finals receiving the bye for the elimination-finals in which the teams from third placed to sixth place enter the elimination-finals with "third against sixth" and "fourth against fifth". Losers for the elimination-finals are eliminated, and winners qualify for the semi-finals.

First placed team in the semi-finals plays the lowest ranked elimination-final winning team and second placed team in the semi-finals plays the highest ranked elimination-final winner. Home advantage goes to the team with the higher ladder position.

Elimination-finals
4	Adelaide United (a.e.t.)	1
5	Melbourne City	0
3	Melbourne Victory	3
6	Wellington Phoenix	1

Semi-finals
1	Perth Glory (p)	3 (5)
4	Adelaide United	3 (4)
2	Sydney FC	6
3	Melbourne Victory	1

Grand Final
1	Perth Glory	0 (1)
2	Sydney FC (p)	0 (4)

=== Elimination-finals ===
Third-placed Melbourne Victory as the reigning champions took on sixth-placed Wellington Phoenix for the first elimination-final. All three matches from the regular season resulted in draws. Georg Niedermeier opened the scoring for Victory towards the end of the first half, Kosta Barbarouses scored the second as Roy Krishna pulled one back for Wellington, but Ola Toivonen sealing the match to win 3–1 for Melbourne Victory through to the semi-final against Sydney FC.

3 May 2019
19:50 AEST

Melbourne Victory	3–1	Wellington Phoenix
Niedermeier 42'; Barbarouses 53'; Toivonen 71'	Report	Krishna 64'

AAMI Park, Melbourne
Attendance: 16,010
Referee: Shaun Evans

Fourth-placed Adelaide United took on fifth-placed Melbourne City for the second elimination-final. City were undefeated against Adelaide throughout the regular season. The match went to extra time after a 0–0 draw at the end of 90 minutes, as Ben Halloran scored the winning goal in the 119th minute to win 1–0 for Adelaide as they went through to the semi-final against Perth Glory.

5 May 2019
18:30 ACST

Adelaide United	1–0 (a.e.t.)	Melbourne City
Halloran 119'	Report

Coopers Stadium, Adelaide
Attendance: 13,323
Referee: Kurt Ams

=== Semi-finals ===
Premiers Perth Glory and Adelaide United met in this semi-final. Diego Castro scored two goals for Perth towards the 75th minute mark, until Baba Diawara scored one back for Adelaide and Ryan Kitto equalising in the 94th minute of regular time to send the match into extra time. Scott Neville scored to give Perth the lead again, until Michael Marrone headed another equaliser 3–3 for the match to be decided by a penalty shoot-out. Adelaide were chosen to go first with three successive penalties to start off with Perth missing one of their penalties. Perth equalised in the shoot-out towards the final fifth kick. Two sets of missed penalties occurred until Adelaide missed and Joel Chianese for Perth won them the shoot-out 5–4 through to the Grand Final.

10 May 2019
18:30 AEST

Perth Glory	3–3 (a.e.t.)	Adelaide United
Castro 29', 74'; Neville 104'	Report	Diawara 81'; Kitto 90+4'; Marrone 115'
Penalties
Juande (penalty scored); Castro (penalty missed); Santalab (penalty scored); Reddy (penalty scored); Brimmer (penalty scored); Davidson (penalty missed); Lowry (penalty missed); Chianese (penalty scored)	5–4	(penalty scored) Goodwin; (penalty scored) Elsey; (penalty scored) Lia; (penalty missed) Isaías; (penalty scored) Halloran; (penalty missed) Diawara; (penalty missed) Mileusnic; (penalty missed) Konstandopoulos

HBF Park, Perth
Attendance: 17,878
Referee: Alex King

Sydney FC hosted Melbourne Victory; the same fixture in the previous edition's semi-final where Victory won in extra time to the Grand Final. Sydney quickly scored through Aaron Calver three minutes in, Alex Brosque scored a second as well as an own goal by Leigh Broxham towards half time. Adam Le Fondre scored twice including a penalty to make it and Miloš Ninković scored Sydney's sixth. Ola Toivonen in stoppage time scored a consolation goal for Victory in the 91st minute, as it was full time with Sydney revenge winning 6–1 through to the Grand Final.

12 May 2019
19:00 AEST

Sydney FC	6–1	Melbourne Victory
Calver 3'; Brosque 43'; Broxham 45+2' (o.g.); Le Fondre 63' (pen.), 68'; Ninković 88'	Report	Toivonen 90+1'

Netstrata Jubilee Stadium, Sydney
Attendance: 12,141
Referee: Chris Beath

=== Grand Final ===
The 2019 Grand Final had Perth Glory host Sydney FC; the first Australian national league grand final hosted in Perth since the 2003 National Soccer League Grand Final. Sydney has won their last 10 out of 11 matches against Perth who has lost one of their last 10 home matches. The match ultimately ended 0–0 after extra time as the match went into penalties. Both teams respectively scored their first goals in the shoot-out until Andrew Redmayne saved the next two penalties as Reza Ghoochannejhad scored the decisive goal in the shoot-out to win the Grand Final for Sydney FC after winning 4–1 on penalties.

19 May 2019
16:45 AWST

Perth Glory	0–0 (a.e.t.)	Sydney FC
Penalties
Juande (penalty scored); Keogh (penalty missed); Santalab (penalty missed)	1–4	(penalty scored) Le Fondre; (penalty scored) O'Neill; (penalty scored) Grant; (penalty scored) Ghoochannejhad

Optus Stadium, Perth
Attendance: 56,371
Referee: Shaun Evans
