= Besart Berisha =

Kosovan association football player

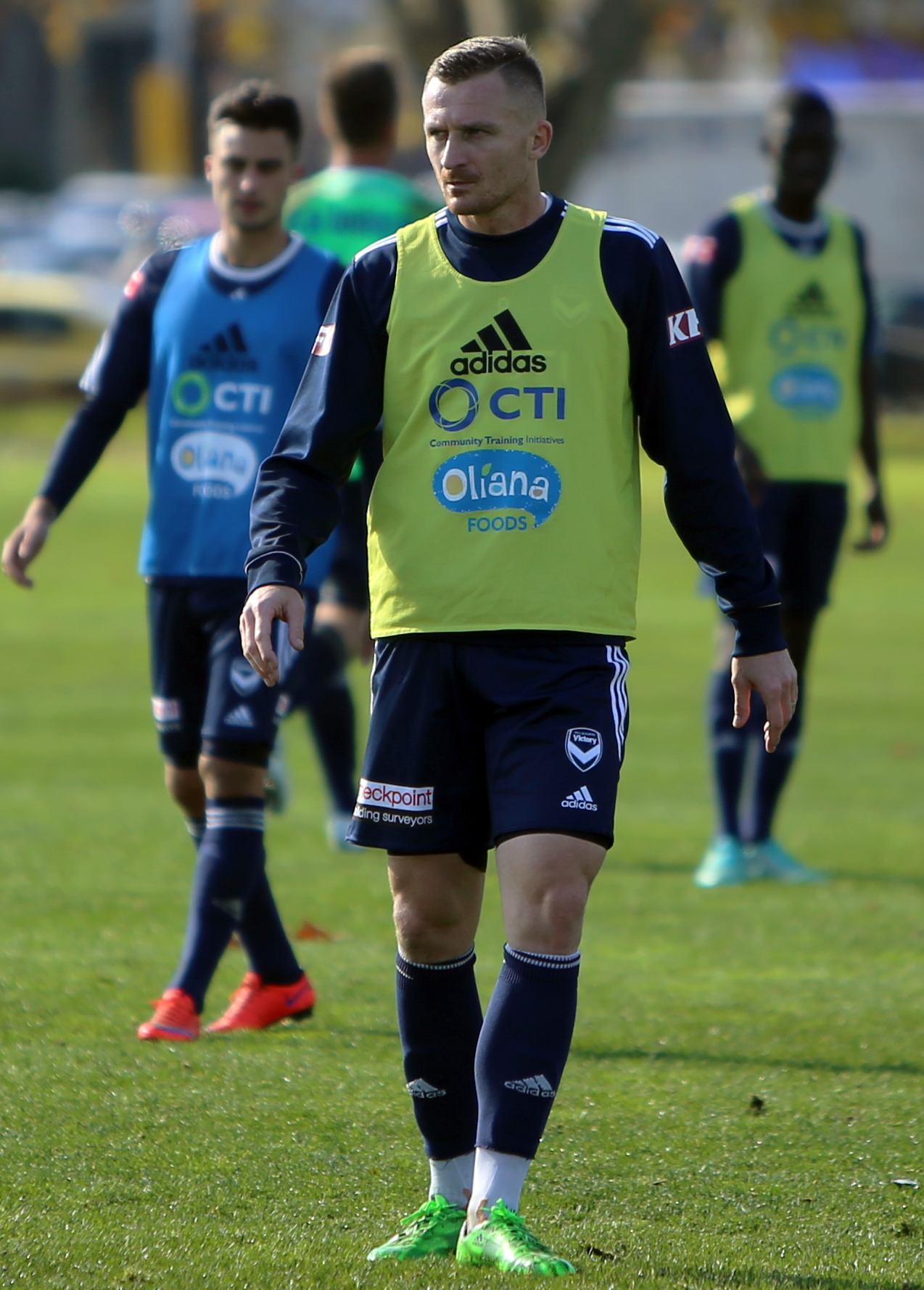
- Berisha in training for Melbourne Victory in 2015

Personal information
- Full name: Besart Selim Berisha
- Date of birth: 29 July 1985 (age 41)
- Place of birth: Pristina, SR Serbia, SFR Yugoslavia
- Height: 1.83 m (6 ft 0 in)
- Position: Striker

Team information
- Current team: Melbourne Victory VPL (Manager)

Youth career
- 1994–1998: Berliner VB 49
- 1998–1999: Berliner FC Dynamo
- 1999–2000: TSV Lichtenberg
- 2000–2003: SV Lichtenberg
- 2003–2004: Tennis Borussia Berlin

Senior career*
Years	Team	Apps	(Gls)
2003–2004	Tennis Borussia Berlin	4	(1)
2004–2007	Hamburger SV	12	(1)
2005	→ Aalborg (loan)	2	(0)
2005–2006	→ Horsens (loan)	32	(11)
2007–2009	Burnley	0	(0)
2008	→ Rosenborg (loan)	8	(3)
2009	→ Horsens (loan)	13	(4)
2010–2011	Arminia Bielefeld	28	(2)
2011–2014	Brisbane Roar	76	(48)
2014–2018	Melbourne Victory	110	(68)
2018–2019	Sanfrecce Hiroshima	6	(0)
2019–2021	Western United	45	(26)
2021	Prishtina	3	(0)
Total		339	(164)

International career
2006–2009	Albania	17	(1)
2017	Kosovo	1	(0)

Managerial career
- 2024: Prishtina (assistant)
- 2025–: Melbourne Victory VPL (Manager)
- * Club domestic league appearances and goals

Besart Selim Berisha (Albanian: [bɛˈsaɾt sɛˈlim bɛˈɾiʃa]; born 29 July 1985) is a Kosovan professional football coach and former player who is the current manager of Melbourne Victory seniors academy team based in Victoria, Australia. Previously he held an assistant manager role of Kosovo Superleague club Prishtina. Best known for his time in Australia, is regarded as one of the greatest players in the history of the A-League Men, having made 231 appearances and scoring 142 goals in the competition.

== Club career ==
=== Youth and Hamburger SV ===
Berisha began his youth career at German side Berliner VB 49 academies aged nine. He then moved to various German teams, such as Berliner FC Dynamo, TSV Lichtenberg, SV Lichtenberg 47 until 2003, when he moved to NOFV-Oberliga club Tennis Borussia Berlin, where a 17-year-old Berisha won the national youth league's golden boot, outclassing future Germany strikers, Mario Gomez and Lukas Podolski. He stayed for just a year before being spotted by Bundesliga club Hamburger SV.

For the first half of the 2004–05 season, Berisha wasn't included in Hamburg's starting lineup for any of the matches, and for the second half he was loaned to Danish Superliga team Aalborg Boldspilklub where he spent a rather unsuccessful spell, playing only three games and scoring no goals.

The following season 2005–06 he was loaned to fellow Superliga side AC Horsens, where he scored 11 goals in 32 appearances, becoming the team's top scorer that season.

For the 2006–07 football season, he remained at Hamburg and was given his chances in the first team making his German Bundesliga debut on 12 August 2006 against Arminia Bielefeld, coming on as a substitute in the 78th minute in place of Nigel de Jong, as the match finished in a 1–1 draw. On 6 December 2006, Berisha became the first Albanian ever to score a goal in the group stages of the UEFA Champions League by scoring his first goal for Hamburg in the match against CSKA Moscow at home in Hamburg. Exactly 10 days later, on 16 December 2006, Berisha managed to score his first Bundesliga goal against Alemannia Aachen, as the starting striker and scoring the opening goal in the 32nd minute in the match as it finished in an away draw 3–3. He went on to make a total 14 appearances for Hamburg in the 2006–07 season, including one in the German cup and two in the UEFA Champions League, and eleven of them as a substitute. After the sacking of Thomas Doll and the arrival of Huub Stevens as Hamburg's new manager, Berisha was not seen as part of his plan for the team and remained on the bench for the rest of the season.

=== Burnley ===
On 3 July 2007, Burnley purchased Berisha from Hamburg for £340,000, this followed his impressive performance for Albania against England B on Burnley's home ground Turf Moor. After his performance many European clubs were interested in signing the player but Berisha was eventually signed to Burnley on a three-year deal, subject to the player being granted a work permit. The permit was eventually granted on 3 July 2007 and the deal was completed.

Berisha was ruled out for the 2007–08 season when he picked up an injury while playing for his country in an International friendly against Malta. It was originally believed to be a minor knock to the knee but it was later discovered that the injury was more serious and was likely to keep the player out for 5–6 weeks. After seeing a surgeon it was further revealed that the player had in fact snapped his cruciate ligament in his knee and would not return to football for a year. The reason that doctors had originally failed to discover the damaged ligament was due to a buildup of fluid in the knee which distorted the scans image.

Ten months after suffering his serious knee injury, Berisha made his return to football in a pre-season friendly match in the USA against Carolina Railhawks when he came on in the 71st minute for Joey Guðjónsson. Berisha did not exert an influence in the 20 minutes that he spent on the field having just flown to America 24 hours earlier from Albania. The American side defeated Burnley 2–1.

==== Loan to Rosenborg ====
He was loaned to Rosenborg in the autumn of 2008, scoring twice in his debut on 10 August 2008 against rivals Molde FK at Lerkendal Stadion in a 3–1 victory for Rosenborg. On 21 September 2008, Berisha scored in a 4–0 victory against HamKam.

Berisha started for Rosenborg on 14 August 2008 in the first leg of the 2008–09 UEFA Cup qualifying rounds, a 2:1 loss to Djurgården, coming off in the 76th minute. He played only the first half in the second-leg, a 5–0 home victory, as Rosenborg won 6–2 on aggregate to advance to the next round against Brøndby. He played only in the second leg on 2 October 2008 which Rosenborg won 3–2. Rosenborg won 5–3 on aggregate, advancing to the Group stage where they faced Saint-Étienne, Valencia, Copenhagen and Club Brugge. Berisha played only once, against Club Brugge on 23 October 2008, coming on as a substitute in the 90th minute. The match finished in a goalless draw.

==== Loan to Horsens ====
Berisha joined AC Horsens on loan on 8 January 2009 but returned prematurely to Burnley F.C. on 26 May 2009 despite having scored some important goals for AC Horsens. The Danish club dissolved the loan contract after an incident in training involving Berisha and Kenneth Emil Petersen.

His contract with Burnley ran until 2010, but having failed to make a single competitive start for Burnley after his return, the club announced on 31 July 2009 that Berisha would be transferred to German Bundesliga 2 team Arminia Bielefeld. The transfer fee was believed to be £75,000.

=== Arminia Bielefeld ===
Berisha officially joined Bielefeld on 5 August 2009. In the 2009–10 season, Berisha finished scoreless, having made just 11 appearances, only two as a starter, since his debut on 10 August 2009 against Hansa Rostock. The match was a 3–1 victory with Berisha coming on as a substitute in the 80th minute.

He started the 2010–11 season on 22 September 2010 as a substitute in a 3–1 loss to Bochum and scored his first goal of the season on 29 September 2010 in a 1–2 loss to Union Berlin. He finished the season with a total of 19 appearances, 12 as a starter. In 15 matches Berisha was an unused substitute.

=== Brisbane Roar ===
==== 2011–12 season ====
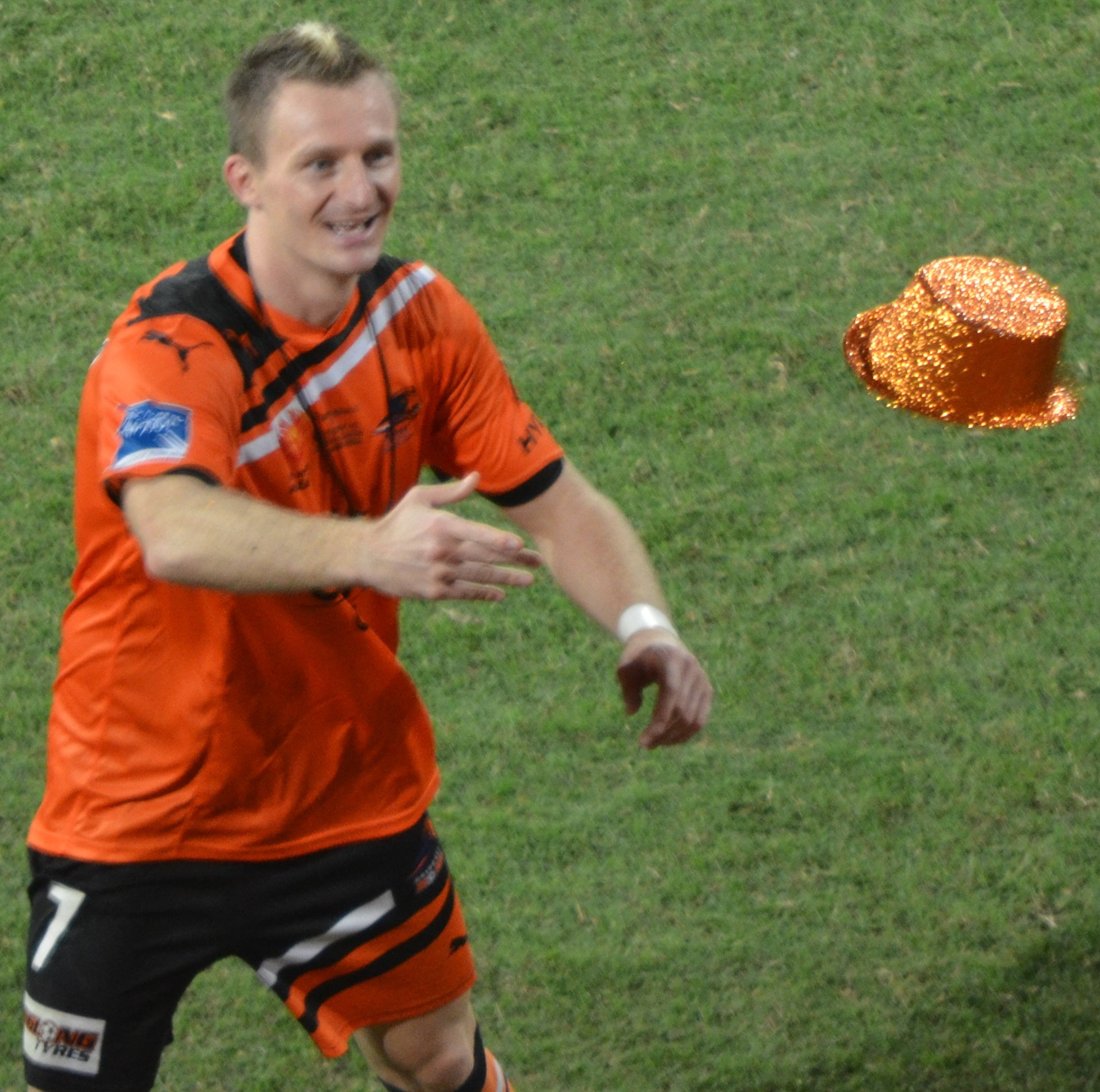
Berisha celebrating Brisbane's 2012 A-League Grand Final win in 2012.

On 16 August 2011, Brisbane Roar manager Ange Postecoglou announced that Berisha had agreed to a one-year deal with the 2010–11 A-League champions. Berisha scored his first goal for Brisbane in round two against Sydney FC. Berisha scored four goals in a 7–1 thrashing against Adelaide United in round four, Brisbane's biggest ever victory and making him the first player to score more than three goals in a single game for the club.

On 14 January 2012, Berisha was involved in an on-field melee with Sydney FC defender Pascal Bosschaart. Despite being cleared by the referee's post-match report and the Match Review Panel, Berisha was found to have breached the FFA Code of Conduct and was banned for one match. On 14 February 2012, it was announced that Berisha had signed a two-year contract extension, taking him to the end of the 2013–14 season. Berisha's "volatile" personality led to occasional clashes with teammates, both at training and on-field, as well as with opposition players. However, he was largely praised for his passionate approach to the game.

In the 2012 A-League Grand Final against Perth Glory, Berisha scored a brace, one in the final seconds from a controversial penalty kick, to help the Roar win 2–1 and become the first team to win back-to-back A-League championships. Berisha became the first Albanian to score in two different Champions Leagues when he scored against F.C. Tokyo in the Asian Champions League. In the 2011–12 A-League season, Berisha won the Golden Boot with 19 goals, the Football Media Association Player of the Year, the Players' Player of the Year, and Members' Player of the Year awards. Berisha finished the season with 23 goals from 35 games, a record for a player in a season for Brisbane. His season tally included 19 goals in the regular season of the A-League; a joint all-time record.

==== 2012–13 season ====
Berisha's 2012–13 season was less notable than his debut season for the club. However, he still managed to finish what was a disappointing season for Brisbane with 14 goals from 28 appearances in all competitions. Berisha scored a number of important goals for Brisbane as they struggled to find the form that won them two consecutive championships; he scored the sole goal in Round 9 as ten man Brisbane saw off Newcastle Jets at home. However, arguably none were as important as the opening goal of the final round victory over Sydney FC which confirmed Brisbane's place in the post-season finals series.

==== 2013–14 season ====
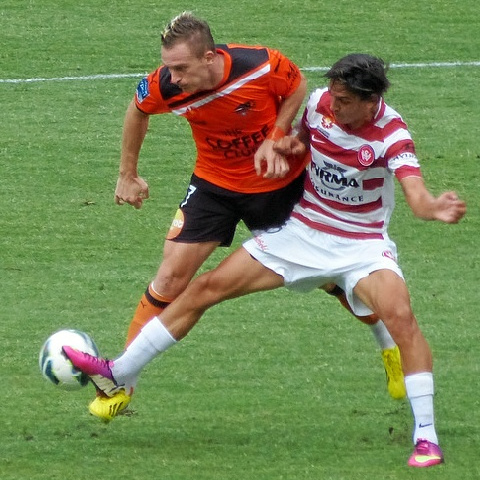
Berisha playing against Jérome Polenz in 2013.

The 2013–14 season started poorly for Berisha, despite scoring in the opening round win over Wellington Phoenix, he injured his hamstring in Round 2 which kept him on the sidelines for four weeks. Upon his return, he scored four goals in his next five appearances including a second half winner against Perth Glory and a brace in a 2–1 defeat of Adelaide United, however a hip injury then sidelined him for a further two weeks. Despite Berisha again scoring on his return from injury, on this occasion he could not prevent defeat to Adelaide at home. In the following match away to Perth Glory he received his first red card in the A-League. He was unfortunate to be booked in the first 30 seconds of the game while contesting a header with Michael Thwaite; he was then given his marching orders in the 32nd minute after receiving a second yellow card for a reckless tackle on the same player. Berisha scored on his return from suspension, netting a 90th-minute winner against Central Coast Mariners. On 27 April 2014, Berisha scored and gave his team the victory 1–0 against Melbourne Victory, valid for semi-finals of the A-League. With this victory, Brisbane Roar advanced to the final match and played on 4 May 2014 against Western Sydney Wanderers winning the match 2–1 after extra-time, Berisha scoring the match equalising goal after the Wanderers scored the opening goal. With the score 1–1 after 90 minutes the match went into 30 minutes of extra-time, when Brisbane scored the winning goal in the 108th minute by Henrique Silva and were declared the champions of the 2013–14 season. Berisha finished the 2013–14 season with a total of 20 appearances and scoring 13 goals, ranked second top-scorer of the A-League.

=== Melbourne Victory ===
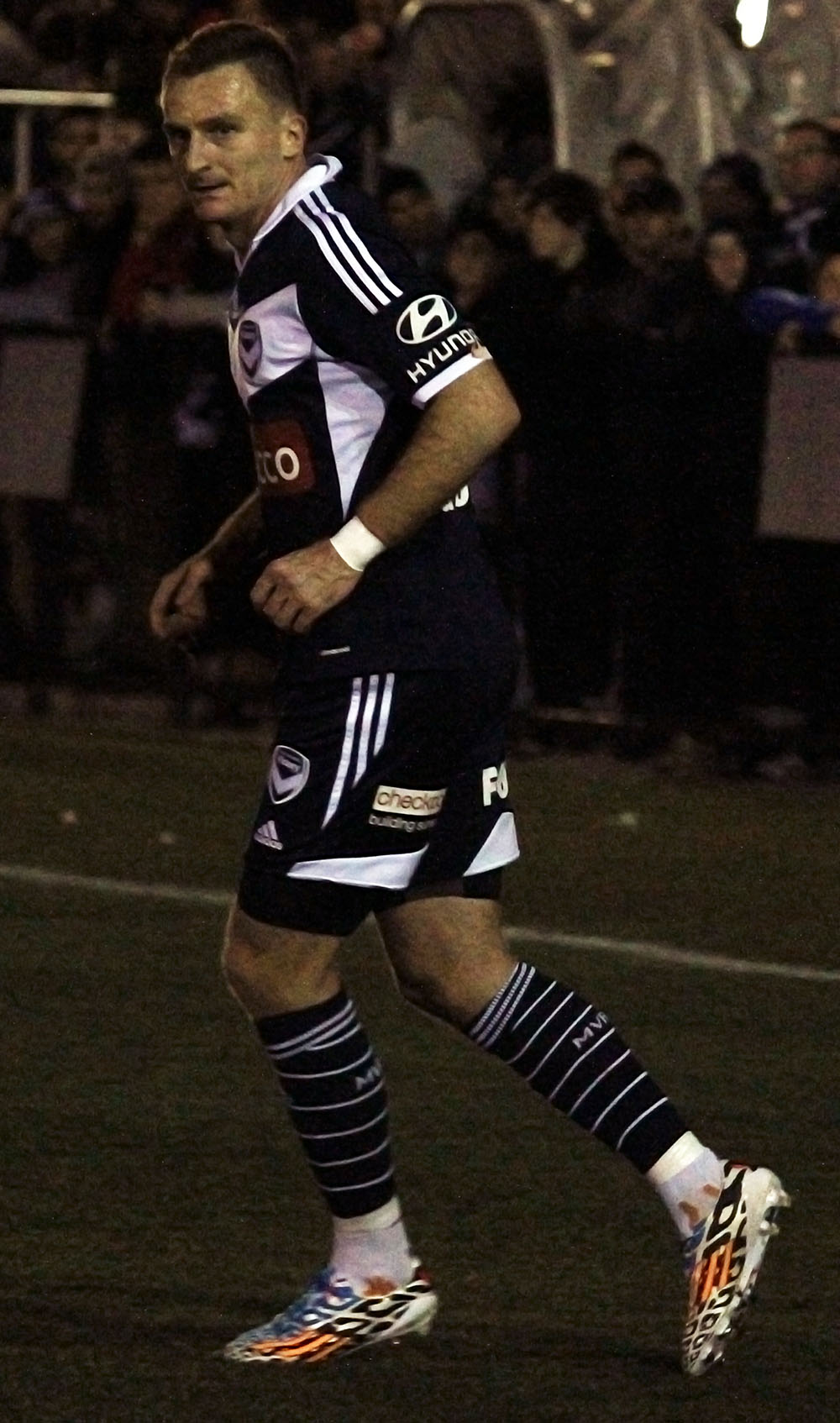
Berisha playing in a pre-season friendly match for Melbourne Victory in 2014

On 22 January 2014, it was announced that A-League club Melbourne Victory had agreed to sign Berisha as the club's International Marquee player when his contract with Brisbane expires at the conclusion of the 2013–14 season. The contract is for two seasons commencing in the 2014–15 season and is worth $1.5 million, more than double his wage at Brisbane.

Berisha had his competitive debut for Victory on 20 August 2014 in a 2014 FFA Cup Round of 32 match against Bayswater City SC away in Perth winning praise for his impact, assisting Archie Thompson's 77th-minute goal, followed by a hat-trick in the next round of the same competition in a 0–6 win away to Tuggeranong United in Canberra on 16 September.

Berisha made his A-League debut for the Victory in their first round clash with the Western Sydney Wanderers. In the same match, Berisha scored his first A-League goal for the Victory, and the 2nd goal of the new A-League season, from a penalty kick in the 19th minute of the match, putting the Victory 2–0 up, in an eventual 4–1 win for the Victory.

In his third appearance & start for his new club, Berisha made his debut in the newly re-established Melbourne Derby against Melbourne City FC in round 3 on 25 October 2014. In this match, Berisha scored his first hat-trick for the club, scoring Victory's second, third and fourth goals in an eventual 5–2 win in front of an attendance of 43,729 at Docklands Stadium, with the first and last goals coming from veteran teammate Archie Thompson. At this point of his Melbourne Victory career, Berisha had played a combined total of five games for the club, scoring seven goals and giving one assist. His goal scoring tally went up to 13 goals in the regular part of season, thus helping Melbourne Victory to win Premiership. In the final, Berisha scored the opener against arch rivals F.C. Sydney which Victory went to win 3–0.

On 2 December 2015, Berisha extended his contract with Victory for two further seasons, with his new deal set to end at the completion of the 2017–18 A-League season.

In November 2016, Berisha was announced as seeking Australian citizenship, after spending the required five years in the country, to be naturalised. He will be eligible for citizenship in October 2017. Once this has been achieved, Victory will be able to sign an additional visa player. On 17 December 2016, Berisha scored the winning goal in the 22nd Melbourne Derby. In doing so, he equalled Archie Thompson's tally of 90 goals in the A-League, the most ever scored by an individual in the league.

On 2 January 2017, Berisha became the A-League's all-time leading goalscorer, after scoring a penalty in an eventual 4–2 win over Newcastle.

On 14 April 2017, Berisha became the A-league's first ever player to score 100 goals in the competition after scoring a goal in a 1–0 win over the Central Coast Mariners. This goal also brought his regular season tally to 19, earning him a tie with Jamie Maclaren for the 2016–17 Golden Boot.

With 68 A-League goals, Berisha is Melbourne Victory's second-highest goalscorer behind Archie Thompson.

=== Sanfrecce Hiroshima ===
In June 2018, Melbourne Victory confirmed Berisha left the club to join J1 League side Sanfrecce Hiroshima. On 2 July 2018. Berisha is officially presented after signing a year and a half contract. On 28 July 2018, he made his debut in a 1–4 home defeat against Urawa Red Diamonds after coming on as a substitute at 68th minute in place of Teerasil Dangda.

=== Western United ===
On 27 September 2019, Berisha returned to the A-League, joining expansion club Western United, who are also a rival of his old club Melbourne Victory. In July 2021, following two years at the club, Berisha left at the end of his contract.

=== Prishtina ===
On 15 September 2021, Berisha joined Football Superleague of Kosovo side Prishtina. Seven days later, the club confirmed that Berisha's transfer was permanent and received squad number 33. On 3 October 2021, he made his debut in a 0–0 away draw against Drita after coming on as a substitute at 77th minute in place of Gauthier Mankenda.

=== Retirement ===
On 27 January 2022, Berisha announced through his Instagram account that he has retired from football.

== International career ==
=== Albania ===
Berisha started applying for Albanian citizenship in September 2006 along with Mërgim Mavraj, Genc Mehmeti and Alban Dragusha, this following the recommendations of Hans-Peter Briegel before he resigned from his role as the manager of the Albania national team. Berisha received the Albanian citizenship on 7 September 2006 along with Mavraj. Despite these four players were tested and selected by Hans-Peter Briegel, but only three of them were in plans of the next upcoming coach of Albania, Otto Barić, where the Croatian coach meet Berisha in Germany and coach Thomas Doll and had only required his services, Mërgim Mavraj's and Genc Mehmeti's, as for Alban Dragusha he has not given any concrete statement.

==== UEFA Euro 2008 qualifying ====
Berisha received his first call up and played his first game for Albania under the coach Otto Barić, on 11 October 2006 against the Netherlands valid for the UEFA Euro 2008 qualifying Group G and where Berisha came on as a substitute in the 79th minute for Erjon Bogdani, as the match finished in the 2–1 loss. In another four following matches he was called up and played in all four matches including two in the starting line up. First he played as a substitute in a goalless draw on 24 March 2007 against Slovenia replacing Devi Muka in the 86th minute and playing for the first time as attacking midfielder behind the back of Alban Bushi and Erjon Bogdani. Then four days later in another goalless draw in a row, against Bulgaria, Berisha played as a starter along Erjon Bogdani in the forward line forming the duo-strikers partnership, Then Berisha was substituted off in the second half 79th minute by Alban Bushi. In the next upcoming matches both against Luxembourg on 2 and 6 June 2007, Berisha returned to play as a starter in the midfield in the first match, but got substituted off by Devi Muka at half-time as the match finished in 2–0 with both goals scored by Edmond Kapllani in the first half when Berisha played. For the second match, Berisha came in as a substitute in the 67th minute for Alban Bushi and five minutes later Edmond Kapllani scored for Albania to secure the clean 3–0 win.

He scored his first goal for Albania on 25 May 2007, during a friendly match with England B played at Turf Moor, in Burnley, England, where he showed impressive form and was the Albanian man of the match. This goal was not recognized because the match was not between two fully senior teams. The first fully senior international goal was scored by Berisha on 22 August 2007 in a friendly match against Malta which Albania won 3–0. Berisha was in the starting line up and managed to score in the 46th minute of the second half. On 19 November 2008, Berisha assisted the equalizing goal scored by Ervin Skela in the friendly match against Azerbaijan which ended exactly as a 1–1 draw.

==== 2010 FIFA World Cup qualification ====
During the World Cup 2010 qualifiers, he was called up regularly in the national team for all 10 group matches, playing on eight of them.

For the two matches against Hungary on 28 March 2009 and Denmark on 1 April 2009, coach Arie Haan left out Erjon Bogdani, a regular starter during the tournament, because the striker of Chievo Verona did not play for some time in the Italian Serie A. In those two matches Berisha gained a chance to play as a starter and in the 0–1 loss against Hungary on 28 March 2009, he completed the entire 90-minutes match forming a striker partnership with Hamdi Salihi. And four days later in a 0–3 loss against Denmark on 1 April 2009, he played once again in the starting line up as a single striker, then substituted off by Migen Memelli in the 85th minute. After the end of the tournament, he refused permanently to be called up for the national team's fixtures, one reason being that he lived a long distance away from Albania.

As of 14 October 2009, his last game with the national team, Berisha had made 17 appearances and scored one goal for Albania.

On 9 December 2013, he declared that after the opening of the winter transfer period he will sign for a football-club in Europe to be more close Albania and to play again for the national team, but suddenly on 22 January 2014 it was announced that fellow A-League club Melbourne Victory had agreed to sign Berisha for next season 2014–15. On 5 April 2014, he was asked by Albania national team coach Gianni De Biasi to play again for Albania only for the official matches valid for UEFA Euro 2016 qualifiers and Berisha asked just ten days for final response. His late response was definitive to not accept latest invitation, as he declared that as long as he was playing in Australia he couldn't come to Albania due to the long distance.

In January 2016, Berisha declared that he was interested in representing Albania in UEFA Euro 2016.

=== Kosovo ===
On 16 August 2016, it was announced that Berisha had accepted an invitation to represent Kosovo, after it was officially recognized by UEFA and FIFA in May 2016. On 4 November 2016, FIFA accepted Berisha's request to play for Kosovo. On 20 March 2017, he received a call-up from Kosovo for a 2018 FIFA World Cup qualifying match against Iceland, making his debut after being named in the starting line-up.

==== Early departure ====
On 11 June 2017, Berisha after the 2018 FIFA World Cup qualifying match against Turkey decided to step down from international duty because he felt Albert Bunjaki, the Kosovo coach was the worst coach he had ever worked with and accused Bunjaki of not giving him any reason as to why he was not being selected. Berisha said he would be available for selection again should Bunjaki leave his role as coach of the Kosovo national team.

== Personal life ==
Besart Berisha was born in Pristina and moved later to Germany where he was raised. He is the brother-in-law of Albanian footballers Enis Fetahu and former Kosovo international goalkeeper Samir Ujkani. Berisha became an Australian citizen in 2019.

== Career statistics ==
=== Club ===
As of 1 April 2021

Appearances and goals by club, season and competition
Club	Season	League (Note: Includes A-League final series)			Cup		Continental (Note: Includes FIFA Club World Cup, AFC Champions League)		Total	
Club	Season	Division	Apps	Goals	Apps	Goals	Apps	Goals	Apps	Goals
Tennis Borussia Berlin	2003–04	NOFV-Oberliga Nord	4	1	—		—		4	1
AaB (loan)	2004–05	Danish Superliga	3	0	—		—		3	0
Horsens (loan)	2005–06	Danish Superliga	32	11	—		—		32	11
Horsens (loan)	2008–09	Danish Superliga	10	4	—		—		10	4
Horsens (loan)	Total		42	15	—		—		42	15
Hamburger SV	2006–07	Bundesliga	12	1	1	0	2	1	15	2
Rosenborg (loan)	2008	Tippeligaen	8	3	—		4	0	12	3
Arminia Bielefeld	2010–11	2. Bundesliga	28	2	1	0	—		29	2
Brisbane Roar	2011–12	A-League	29	21	—		6	2	35	23
Brisbane Roar	2012–13	A-League	27	14	—		1	0	28	14
Brisbane Roar	2013–14	A-League	20	13	—		—		20	13
Brisbane Roar	Total		76	48	—		7	2	83	50
Melbourne Victory	2014–15	A-League	28	15	3	3	—		31	18
Melbourne Victory	2015–16	A-League	26	18	5	5	8	4	39	27
Melbourne Victory	2016–17	A-League	26	19	4	2	—		30	21
Melbourne Victory	2017–18	A-League	28	14	2	2	5	2	35	18
Melbourne Victory	Total		108	66	14	12	13	6	135	84
Sanfrecce Hiroshima	2018	J1 League	6	0	1	0	—		7	0
Western United FC	2019–20	A-League	27	19	—		—		27	19
Western United FC	2020–21	A-League	12	6	—		—		12	6
Western United FC	Total		39	25	0	0	0	0	39	25
Career total			326	161	17	12	21	6	362	179

=== International ===
Appearances and goals by national team and year
National team	Year	Apps	Goals
Albania	2006	1	0
Albania	2007	5	0
Albania	2008	4	0
Albania	2009	6	0
Total		16	0
Kosovo	2017	1	0
Total		1	0

Scores and results list Albania's goal tally first.

No.	Date	Venue	Opponent	Score	Result	Competition
1.	22 August 2007	Qemal Stafa Stadium, Tirana, Albania	Malta	2–0	3–0	Friendly match

== Honours ==
Brisbane Roar

- A-League Premiership: 2013–14
- A-League Championship: 2011–12, 2013–14

Melbourne Victory

- A-League Premiership: 2014–15
- A-League Championship: 2014–15, 2017–18
- FFA Cup: 2015

Individual

- A-League Golden Boot: 2011–12, 2016–17
- A-League Team of The Week: 2011–12 (Rounds 3, 8 and 13)
- Gary Wilkins Medal: 2011–12
- A-League PFA Team of the Season: 2011–12, 2013–14, 2014–15, 2016–17, 2019–20
- A-League All Star: 2013, 2014
- A-League PFA A-League Team of the Decade: 2005–2015
- Melbourne Victory Golden Boot: 2015–16

== See also ==
- List of association footballers who have been capped for two senior national teams
