= Stefan Nigro =

Australian soccer player

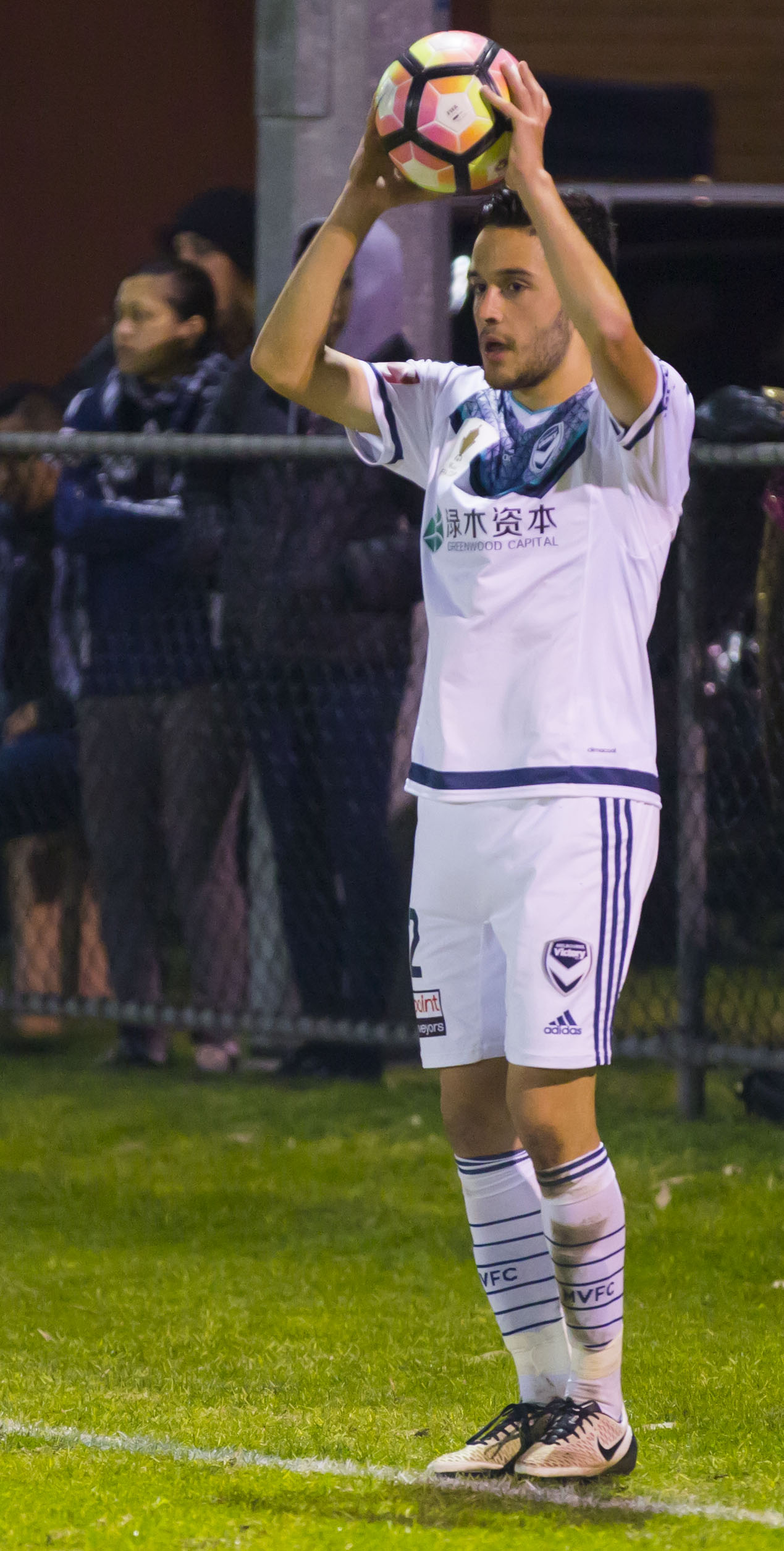
- Nigro playing for Melbourne Victory in a friendly match against Port Melbourne, 9 August 2016

Personal information
- Full name: Stefan Nigro
- Date of birth: 10 August 1996 (age 30)
- Place of birth: Ballarat, Australia
- Height: 1.80 m (5 ft 11 in)
- Positions: Defensive midfielder; right back

Team information
- Current team: Preston Lions
- Number: 32

Youth career
- 2011–2012: Southern Cross Strikers
- 2014: Port Melbourne
- 2015–2016: Melbourne Victory

Senior career*
Years	Team	Apps	(Gls)
2013	Ballarat Red Devils	12	(1)
2014	Port Melbourne	14	(0)
2015–2017	Melbourne Victory NPL	43	(5)
2015–2018	Melbourne Victory	26	(0)
2018–2019	Brisbane Roar	9	(0)
2020	Green Gully	3	(0)
2020–2021	Central Coast Mariners	27	(0)
2021–2024	Melbourne Victory	43	(0)
2025–	Preston Lions	50	(0)

International career^{‡}
2017	Australia U23	2	(0)
- * Club domestic league appearances and goals as of 16 August 2026 ‡ National team caps and goals as of 23 July 2017

Stefan Nigro (born 10 August 1996) is an Australian professional soccer player who currently plays for National Premier Leagues Victoria club Preston Lions.

== Club career ==
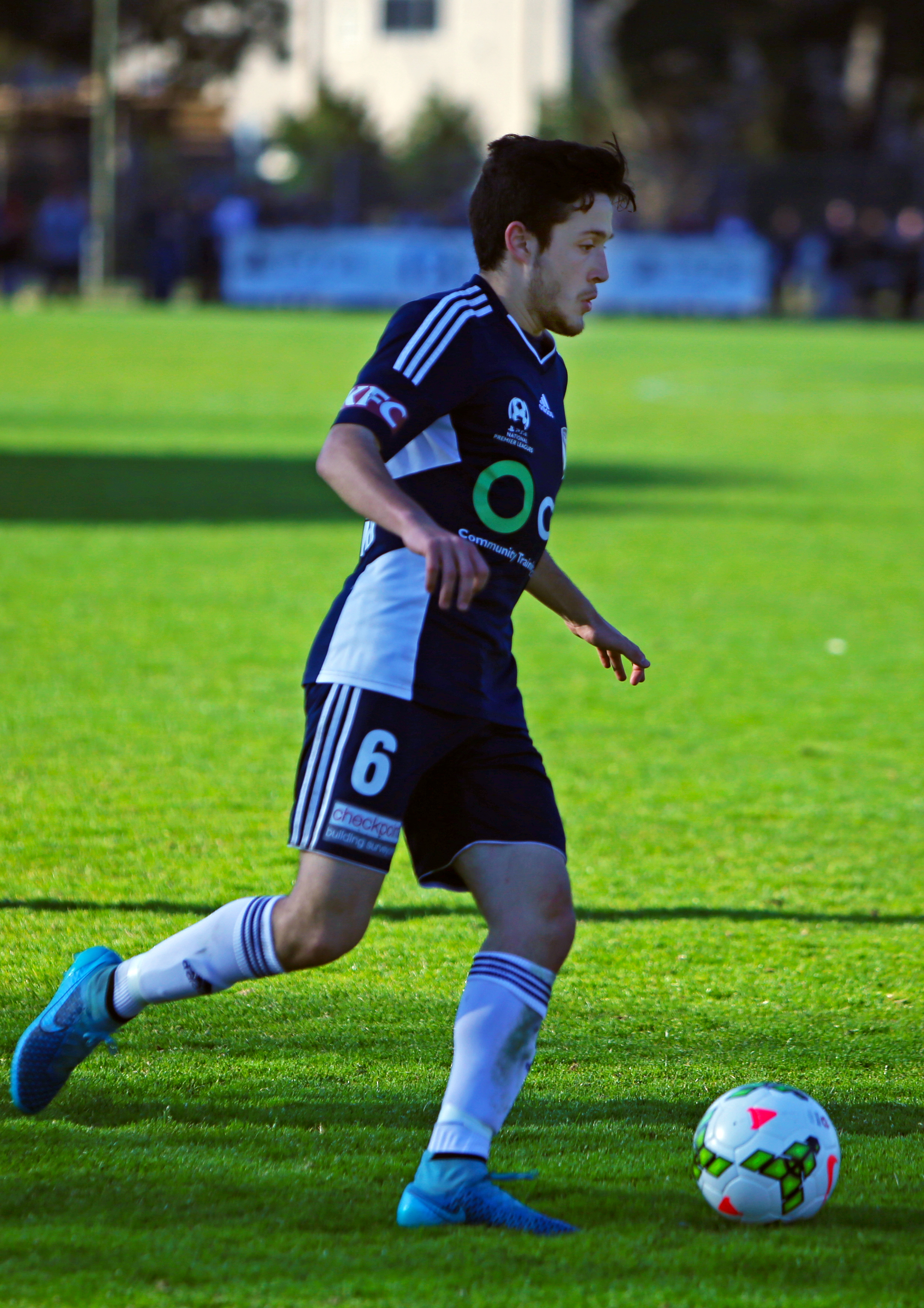
Nigro playing for Melbourne Victory FC, 26 September 2015

Stefan joined the youth squad at Melbourne Victory - the club he was a longtime supporter of - ahead of their successful 2015 National Premier Leagues Victoria 2 season. In the following 2015-16 A-League season he started in three senior matches for Victory, receiving broad praise for his Man of the Match performance against Brisbane Roar in his debut, which included a nutmeg on Thomas Broich.

In June 2016, Victory announced that he had signed a two-year senior contract with the club.

On 15 May 2018, Nigro was released by Melbourne Victory, along with three of his teammates.

On 19 July 2018, Brisbane Roar announced Nigro had signed for the club. He made his debut as a late substitute in a 2-0 win against Melbourne City FC.

At the end of the 2018/19 season, Nigro was released by Brisbane Roar.

Nigro returned to the A-League in December 2020, signing with Central Coast Mariners.

== Personal life ==
Nigro currently studies a Bachelor of Property and Real Estate at Deakin University.

== Honours ==
=== Club ===
Melbourne Victory

- A-League Championship: 2017–18
- FFA Cup: 2021

Preston Lions FC

- Dockerty Cup: 2026
