= 2009–10 Adelaide United FC season =

Adelaide United
2009–10 season
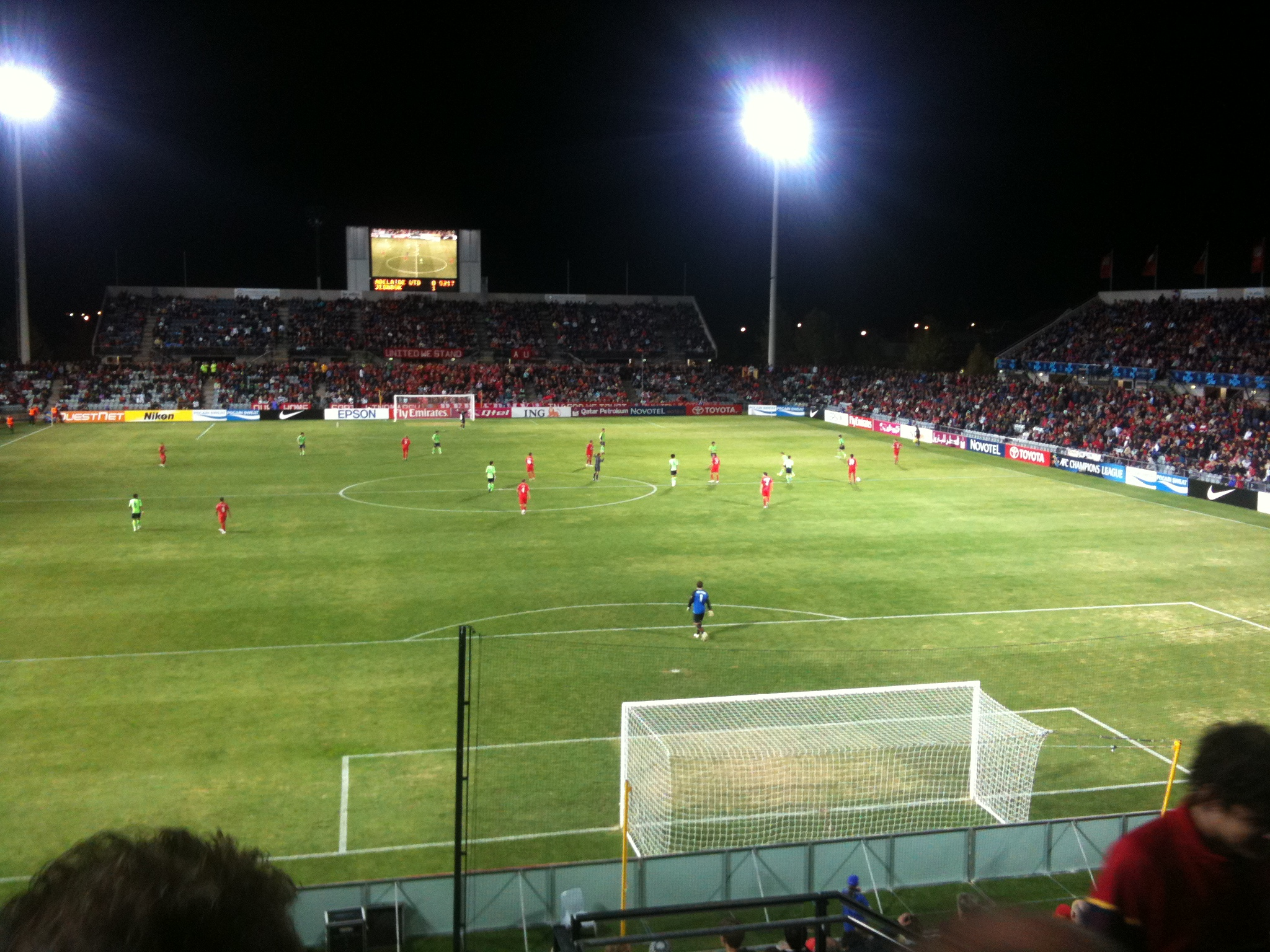
- Adelaide United playing against Jeonbuk Hyundai Motors in the AFC Champions League in May 2010
- Chairman: Mel Patzwald
- Head Coach: Aurelio Vidmar
- Stadium: Coopers Stadium
- A-League: 10th
- A-League Finals: DNQ
- Top goalscorer: League: Lucas Pantelis (5); All: Mathew Leckie; Lucas Pantelis (5 each)
- Highest home attendance: 13,847 vs. Perth Glory (7 August 2009); A-League
- Lowest home attendance: 8,244 vs. Brisbane Roar (6 February 2010); A-League
- Average home league attendance: 10,765
- Biggest win: 2–0 vs. North Queensland Fury (A) (27 September 2009); A-League; 2–0 vs. Brisbane Roar (H) (6 February 2010); A-League; 2–0 vs. Shandong Luneng (A) (10 March 2010); AFC Champions League
- Biggest defeat: 0–2 (5 times); 1–3 (once)
Home colours	Away colours

The 2009–10 Adelaide United FC season was the club's fifth A-League season. It includes the A-League 2009–10 season as well as any other competitions of the 2009–10 football (soccer) season.

After a stellar season in the A-League and internationally, Adelaide United began its pre-season without a financial owner; Nick Bianco relinquished his A-League licence back to Football Federation Australia (FFA). Regardless of this situation, the FFA ensured that Adelaide would have the funds available to recruit in the off-season and to maintain the club, whilst they would negotiate the new ownership deals. Adelaide United managed to secure major sponsors Modern Solar as well as Jim's Plumbing for their 2009–10 season.

At the end of the 2008–09 regular season Adelaide United released veteran Angelo Costanzo as well as Jonas Salley, Isyan Erdogan and Jason Spagnuolo, with Diego Walsh moving to New Zealand club Wellington Phoenix and Saša Ognenovski moving to K-League side Seongnam Ilhwa. Veteran Adelaide players Michael Valkanis, Daniel Beltrame and Paul Agostino retired at the end of the 2008–09 season.

Adelaide made a number of signings to replace the players which left in the off-season, most notably former Sydney FC defenders, Iain Fyfe and Mark Rudan, Korean youngster Inseob Shin and former Drogheda United midfielder Adam Hughes. Arguably the biggest off-season signing was former Cheltenham Town and Brentford striker, Lloyd Owusu, a capped Ghanaian international. The Reds also elevated a handful of players from their Youth squad to the senior team, namely Francesco Monterosso, Michael Marrone and Joe Costa.

After making a rather average start to the 2009–10 season, the Reds made their final signing in promising young Bulleen Lions winger, Mathew Leckie prior to the Round 5 clash against Wellington Phoenix. Leckie made an immediate impression, and scored his first goal in his second game off the bench against North Queensland Fury and would soon become a fan favourite.

With two rounds to go, and Adelaide sitting at the base of the table, the Reds made a surprise announcement that Argentine playmaker, Marcos Flores, who had signed on for 2 years starting with the club's third AFC Champions League venture, was to make his debut as an injury replacement for fellow import Cristiano. The South American made his presence felt in the final two games of the regular season, and helped Adelaide United finish the season with two consecutive wins. This however, was still not enough to lift the club up from its 2009–10 wooden spoon status – the club's worst performing season in its short history.

Adelaide competed in the Champions League in 2010 after finishing second on the 2008–09 A-League league table, and runner-up in the Finals series to cross-border rivals, Melbourne Victory. This will mark the return of Adelaide United to the continental club champions' tournament after a 1-year absence.

On 7 December 2009, Adelaide were drawn into Group H of the Champions League alongside 2009 Asian Champions Pohang Steelers, Chinese sister club Shandong Luneng and the winners of the 2009 Japanese Emperor's Cup. Because Gamba Osaka, the winner of the Emperor's Cup, had already qualified through league placing, 4th placed Sanfrecce Hiroshima became Adelaide United's final opponent in Group H of the Champions League.

In Adelaide's first match of the campaign played on 24 February against Pohang Steelers, Adelaide secured an important victory at Hindmarsh Stadium winning 1–0 courtesy of a fantastic individual effort by youngster Mathew Leckie on the stroke of half-time. They then continued their winning form by beating Shandong Luneng 2–0 and then coming from a 1–2 deficit to beat Sanfrecce Hiroshima 3–2. Despite not quite playing to the standard set in their opening three matches, Adelaide United managed to hold on to top spot in the group by securing a 0–0 draw against Pohang in Korea in between narrow 1–0 losses to Hiroshima in Hiroshima and then to Shandong Luneng at Hindmarsh in Adelaide.

Other results fell Adelaide's way and they finished on top of Group H resulting in a home match in the Round of 16. In an exciting, nerve-racking match, Adelaide lost to Jeonbuk Motors 3–2. Adelaide came back twice in the game, including a goal in the final seconds of the match. Jeonbuk won the match with a goal in the second half of extra time.

== Players ==
=== Squad information ===
==== First Team Roster ====
Note: Flags indicate national team as defined under FIFA eligibility rules; some limited exceptions apply. Players may hold more than one non-FIFA nationality.

No.	Pos.	Nation	Player
1	GK	AUS	Eugene Galeković
2	DF	AUS	Robert Cornthwaite
3	DF	BRA	Alemão
4	DF	AUS	Iain Fyfe
5	DF	AUS	Daniel Mullen (Youth)
6	DF	BRA	Cássio
7	MF	AUS	Lucas Pantelis
8	MF	AUS	Kristian Sarkies
9	FW	BRA	Cristiano
10	MF	AUS	Adam Hughes
11	FW	GHA	Lloyd Owusu
12	MF	AUS	Paul Reid

No.	Pos.	Nation	Player
13	MF	AUS	Travis Dodd (Captain)
14	DF	AUS	Scott Jamieson
15	FW	AUS	Francesco Monterosso (Youth)
16	MF	KOR	Inseob Shin (Youth)
17	DF	AUS	Michael Marrone
18	MF	AUS	Fabian Barbiero
19	MF	AUS	Mathew Leckie (Youth)
20	GK	AUS	Mark Birighitti (Youth)
21	DF	AUS	Mark Rudan
23	MF	AUS	Joe Costa (Youth)
24	MF	ARG	Marcos Flores (Injury replacement player)
25	FW	AUS	Evan Kostopoulos (Youth)

- Injury replacement player for Cristiano.

==== Youth Team Roster ====
Note: Flags indicate national team as defined under FIFA eligibility rules; some limited exceptions apply. Players may hold more than one non-FIFA nationality.

No.	Pos.	Nation	Player
—	GK	AUS	Codey Larkin
—	GK	AUS	Nick Munro
—	DF	AUS	Michael Doyle
—	DF	AUS	Dane Milovanovic
—	DF	AUS	Perry Mitris
—	DF	AUS	Alex Sunasky
—	MF	AUS	Joel Allwright
—	MF	AUS	Andrew Ciarla

No.	Pos.	Nation	Player
—	MF	AUS	Nathan Farrell
—	MF	AUS	Kingsley Francis
—	MF	AUS	Matthew Mullen
—	MF	AUS	Brett Rayner
—	MF	AUS	Liam Wooding
—	MF	AUS	Joe Wright
—	FW	AUS	Evan Kostopoulos

=== 2009–10 Transfers ===
==== First Team ====
In

Name	Position	Moving from	Fee
(Australia) Iain Fyfe	Defender	(Australia) Sydney FC	TBA
(Australia) Michael Marrone	Defender	(Australia) Adelaide United Youth	-
(Australia) Adam Hughes	Midfielder	(Republic of Ireland) Drogheda United	Free
(Australia) Joe Costa	Midfielder	(Australia) Adelaide United Youth	-
(Australia) Francesco Monterosso	Striker	(Australia) Adelaide United Youth	-
(Ghana) Lloyd Owusu	Striker	(England) Cheltenham Town	TBA
(South Korea) Inseob Shin	Midfielder	(South Korea) Konkuk University	Free
(Australia) Mark Rudan	Defender	(Liechtenstein) FC Vaduz	Free
(Australia) Mathew Leckie	Midfielder	(Australia) Bulleen Lions	Free
(Argentina) Marcos Flores	Midfielder	(Chile) Curicó Unido	Free * Injury replacement for Cristiano

Out

Name	Position	Moving to	Fee
(Australia) Angelo Costanzo	Defender	(Australia) Newcastle Jets	–
(Australia) Jonas Salley	Midfielder	Shaanxi Neo-China Chanba F.C.	–
(Australia) Jason Spagnuolo	Midfielder	(Australia) North Queensland Fury	–
(Australia) Michael Valkanis	Defender	Retired	–
(Australia) Paul Agostino	Striker	Retired	–
(Brazil) Diego	Midfielder	(Australia) Wellington Phoenix	TBA
(Australia) Saša Ognenovski	Defender	(South Korea) Seongnam Ilhwa Chunma	TBA
(Australia) Robert Younis	Striker	(Australia) APIA Leichhardt	–
(Australia) Isyan Erdogan	Defender	(Australia) Hume City FC	–
(Australia) Daniel Beltrame	Goalkeeper	Retired	–

==== Youth Team ====
In

Out

Name	Position	Moving to	Fee
(Australia) Michael Marrone	Defender	(Australia) Adelaide United	-
(Australia) Osama Malik	Midfielder	(Australia) North Queensland Fury	-
(Australia) Joe Costa	Midfielder	(Australia) Adelaide United	-
(Australia) Francesco Monterosso	Striker	(Australia) Adelaide United	-

== Technical Staff ==
Position	Name
Head coach	(Australia) Aurelio Vidmar
Assistant coach	(Australia) Phil Stubbins
Specialist coach	(Australia) Carl Veart
Goalkeeping coach	(Australia) Peter Blazincic
Youth Team Coach	(Australia) Joe Mullen

== Statistics ==
=== Squad statistics ===
No.	Pos.	Name	A-League		A-League Finals		Total		Discipline	
No.	Pos.	Name	Apps	Goals	Apps	Goals	Apps	Goals	Yellow card	Red card
1	GK	(Australia) Eugene Galeković	27	0	0	0	27	0	3	0
2	DF	(Australia) Robert Cornthwaite	19	0	0	0	19	0	4	0
3	DF	(Brazil) Alemão	16	1	0	0	16	1	0	0
4	DF	(Australia) Iain Fyfe	26	1	0	0	26	1	4	0^{†}
5	DF	(Australia) Daniel Mullen	13	0	0	0	13	0	1	0
6	DF	(Brazil) Cássio	19	2	0	0	19	2	2	0
7	MF	(Australia) Lucas Pantelis	23	5	0	0	23	5	2	1
8	MF	(Australia) Kristian Sarkies	11	0	0	0	11	0	1	0
9	FW	(Brazil) Cristiano	24	3	0	0	24	3	1	0
10	DF	(Australia) Adam Hughes	26	1	0	0	26	1	6	0
11	FW	(Ghana) Lloyd Owusu	16	1	0	0	16	1	2	0
12	MF	(Australia) Paul Reid	8	0	0	0	8	0	1	0
13	MF	(Australia) Travis Dodd	23	4	0	0	23	4	5	0
14	DF	(Australia) Scott Jamieson	24	0	0	0	24	0	3	0
15	FW	(Australia) Francesco Monterosso	5	0	0	0	5	0	0	0
16	MF	(South Korea) Inseob Shin	13	0	0	0	13	0	0	0
17	DF	(Australia) Michael Marrone	16	0	0	0	16	0	1	0
18	MF	(Australia) Fabian Barbiero	18	3	0	0	18	3	0	1
19	MF	(Australia) Mathew Leckie	20	3	0	0	20	3	2	0
20	GK	(Australia) Mark Birighitti	0	0	0	0	0	0	0	0
21	DF	(Australia) Mark Rudan	19	0	0	0	19	0	5	0
23	MF	(Australia) Joe Costa	1	0	0	0	1	0	0	0
24	MF	(Argentina) Marcos Flores	2	0	0	0	2	0	0	0
25	FW	(Australia) Evan Kostopoulos	1	0	0	0	1	0	0	0

Last updated: 12 February 2010.
Source: Adelaide United FC
^{†} Iain Fyfe was sent off in Round 19, but the red card was later rescinded by the Match Review Panel

=== Goal scorers ===
Total	Player		Goals per Round																										
Total	Player		1	2	3	4	5	6	7	8	9	10	11	12	13	14	15	16	17	18	19	20	21	22	23	24	25	26	27
5	(Australia)	Lucas Pantelis				2				1											1							1	
4	(Australia)	Travis Dodd	1																		1			1	1				
3	(Brazil)	Cristiano											2					1											
3	(Australia)	Mathew Leckie								1							1												1
3	(Australia)	Fabian Barbiero																		1								1	1
2	(Brazil)	Cássio						1			1																		
1	(Ghana)	Lloyd Owusu				1																							
1	(Australia)	Iain Fyfe					1																						
1	(Australia)	Adam Hughes												1															
1	(Brazil)	Alemão																				1							

A goal was scored from a penalty kick
Two goals were scored from penalty kicks

=== Attendance at home games ===
Round	Date	Opponent	Score AUFC – Away	Attendance	Weekday
1	7 August 2009	Perth Glory	1–0	13,847	Friday
3	21 August 2009	Gold Coast United	0–2	12,741	Friday
4	28 August 2009	North Queensland Fury	3–3	10,773	Friday
6	11 September 2009	Central Coast Mariners	1–0	10,262	Friday
7	18 September 2009	Melbourne Victory	0–2	15,038	Friday
9	5 October 2009	Newcastle Jets	1–1	12,090	Monday
11	16 October 2009	Sydney FC	2–1	10,291	Friday
14	6 November 2009	Brisbane Roar	0–2	11,209	Friday
15	20 November 2009	Gold Coast United	1–1	9,578	Friday
17	4 December 2009	Newcastle Jets	0–2	8,502	Friday
19	19 January 2010	Perth Glory	2–3	8,904	Tuesday
20	18 December 2009	Wellington Phoenix	1–1	9,070	Friday
23	15 January 2010	Central Coast Mariners	1–1	10,156	Friday
26	6 February 2010	Brisbane Roar	2–0	8,244	Saturday

== Competitions ==
=== Pre-season ===
Match	Date	Home team	Score	Away team	Attendance	Stadium
1	2 June 2009	Para Hills Knights	0 – 1 Cristiano	Adelaide United	N/A	The Paddocks
2	9 June 2009	North Eastern MetroStars	1 – 1 Sarkies (N/A)	Adelaide United	N/A	TK Shutter Reserve
3	16 June 2009	Adelaide Raiders	1 – 4 Sarkies 19'; Cornthwaite 35'; Marrone 80'; Dodd 88' (pen.)	Adelaide United	N/A	Croatian Sports Centre
4	26 June 2009	Adelaide United	1 – 0 Dodd 25'	Perth Glory	1,961	Hindmarsh Stadium
5	2 July 2009	North Queensland Fury	3 – 2 Costa 40'; Alemão 50'	Adelaide United	2,547	Darwin Football Stadium
6	8 July 2009	Adelaide United	4 – 0 Monterosso 28'; Hughes 32', 72'; Jamieson 85'	South Australian State Team	N/A	Hindmarsh Stadium
7	26 July 2009	Melbourne Victory	2 – 1 Cássio 58'	Adelaide United	6,257	Aurora Stadium

=== A-League ===
==== League table ====
Pos	Team	Pld	W	D	L	GF	GA	GD	Pts	Qualification
1	Sydney FC (C)	27	15	3	9	35	23	+12	48	Qualification for 2011 AFC Champions League group stage and Finals series
2	Melbourne Victory	27	14	5	8	47	32	+15	47	Qualification for 2011 AFC Champions League group stage and Finals series
3	Gold Coast United	27	13	5	9	39	35	+4	44	Qualification for Finals series
4	Wellington Phoenix	27	10	10	7	37	29	+8	40	Qualification for Finals series
5	Perth Glory	27	11	6	10	40	34	+6	39	Qualification for Finals series
6	Newcastle Jets	27	10	4	13	33	45	−12	34	Qualification for Finals series
7	North Queensland Fury	27	8	8	11	29	46	−17	32	
8	Central Coast Mariners	27	7	9	11	32	29	+3	30	
9	Brisbane Roar	27	8	6	13	32	42	−10	30	
10	Adelaide United	27	7	8	12	24	33	−9	29	

Source: ultimatealeague.com
Rules for classification: 1) points; 2) goal difference; 3) number of goals scored.
(C) Champions

==== Matches ====
Round	Date	Home team	Score	Away team	Attendance	Stadium	Match details
1	7 August 2009	Adelaide United	1 – 0 Dodd 30' (pen.)	Perth Glory	13,847	Hindmarsh Stadium	Report; Summary
2	16 August 2009	Sydney FC	1 – 0	Adelaide United	14,924	Sydney Football Stadium	Report; Summary
3	21 August 2009	Adelaide United	0 – 2	Gold Coast United	12,741	Hindmarsh Stadium	Report; Summary
4	28 August 2009	Adelaide United	3 – 3 Pantelis 23', 90+2' (pen.); Owusu 33'	North Queensland Fury	10,773	Hindmarsh Stadium	Report; Summary
5	4 September 2009	Wellington Phoenix	1 – 1 Fyfe 42'	Adelaide United	7,523	Westpac Stadium	Report; Summary
6	11 September 2009	Adelaide United	1 – 0 Cássio 33'	Central Coast Mariners	10,262	Hindmarsh Stadium	Report; Summary
7	18 September 2009	Adelaide United	0 – 2	Melbourne Victory	15,038	Hindmarsh Stadium	Report; Summary
8	27 September 2009	North Queensland Fury	0 – 2 Pantelis 60'; Leckie 90+2'	Adelaide United	6,745	Dairy Farmers Stadium	Report; Summary
9	5 October 2009	Adelaide United	1 – 1 Cássio 76'	Newcastle Jets	12,090	Hindmarsh Stadium	Report; Summary
10	9 October 2009	Perth Glory	1 – 0	Adelaide United	9,482	Members Equity Stadium	Report; Summary
11	16 October 2009	Adelaide United	2 – 1 Cristiano 30', 54'	Sydney FC	10,291	Hindmarsh Stadium	Report; Summary
12	24 October 2009	Melbourne Victory	3 – 1 Hughes 64'	Adelaide United	21,182	Etihad Stadium	Report; Summary
13	31 October 2009	Central Coast Mariners	0 – 0	Adelaide United	5,437	Canberra Stadium	Report; Summary
14	6 November 2009	Adelaide United	0 – 2	Brisbane Roar	11,209	Hindmarsh Stadium	Report; Summary
15	20 November 2009	Adelaide United	1 – 1 Leckie 90+3'	Gold Coast United	9,578	Hindmarsh Stadium	Report; Summary
16	28 November 2009	North Queensland Fury	2 – 1 Cristiano 90+1'	Adelaide United	5,356	Dairy Farmers Stadium	Report; Summary
17	4 December 2009	Adelaide United	0 – 2	Newcastle Jets	8,502	Hindmarsh Stadium	Report; Summary
18	12 December 2009	Brisbane Roar	0 – 1 Barbiero 78'	Adelaide United	5,801	Suncorp Stadium	Report; Summary
19	19 January 2010	Adelaide United	2 – 3 Pantelis 13'; Dodd 53'	Perth Glory	8,904	Hindmarsh Stadium	Report; Summary
20	18 December 2009	Adelaide United	1 – 1 Alemão 57'	Wellington Phoenix	9,070	Hindmarsh Stadium	Report; Summary
21	27 December 2009	Sydney FC	1 – 0	Adelaide United	11,741	Sydney Football Stadium	Report; Summary
22	9 January 2010	Gold Coast United	1 – 1 Dodd 20'	Adelaide United	4,505	Skilled Park	Report; Summary
23	15 January 2010	Adelaide United	1 – 1 Dodd 43'	Central Coast Mariners	10,156	Hindmarsh Stadium	Report; Summary
24	23 January 2010	Melbourne Victory	2 – 0	Adelaide United	20,361	Etihad Stadium	Report; Summary
25	30 January 2010	Wellington Phoenix	1 – 0	Adelaide United	19,258	AMI Stadium	Report; Summary
26	6 February 2010	Adelaide United	2 – 0 Barbiero 7'; Pantelis 51'	Brisbane Roar	8,244	Hindmarsh Stadium	Report; Summary
27	12 February 2010	Newcastle Jets	1 – 2 Barbiero 8'; Leckie 74'	Adelaide United	6,880	EnergyAustralia Stadium	Report; Summary

=== AFC Champions League ===
==== Group stage ====
Pos	Team	Pld	W	D	L	GF	GA	GD	Pts	Qualification	ADE	POH	HIR	SHA
1	(Australia) Adelaide United	6	3	1	2	6	4	+2	10	Advance to knockout stage	—	1–0	3–2	0–1
2	(South Korea) Pohang Steelers	6	3	1	2	8	7	+1	10	Advance to knockout stage	0–0	—	2–1	1–0
3	(Japan) Sanfrecce Hiroshima	6	3	0	3	11	11	0	9		1–0	4–3	—	0–1
4	(China) Shandong Luneng	6	2	0	4	5	8	−3	6		0–2	1–2	2–3	—

Source: AFC Champions League Official Page

24 February 2010 Match Day 1	Adelaide United	1–0	Pohang Steelers	Adelaide, Australia
19:30 ACDT	Leckie 45+1'; Fyfe (yellow card) 62'; D. Mullen (yellow card) 65'	AFC Preview; AFC Report; AFC Reaction; Club Report; Summary	(yellow card) 83' Jae Won	Stadium: Hindmarsh Stadium; Attendance: 8,374; Referee: Mohsen Basma (Syria)

10 March 2010 Match Day 2	Shandong Luneng	0–2	Adelaide United	Jinan, China
18:00 ACDT	Cui Peng (yellow card) 51'	AFC Preview; AFC Report; AFC Reaction; Club Report; Summary	28' van Dijk; (yellow card) 45+1' Cornthwaite; (yellow card) 56' (goal) 70' Leckie; (yellow card) 65' Pantelis; (yellow card) 87' Hughes	Stadium: Shandong Sports Centre; Attendance: 22,176; Referee: Faghani Alireza (Iran)

24 March 2010 Match Day 3	Adelaide United	3–2	Sanfrecce Hiroshima	Adelaide, Australia
19:30 ACDT	Dodd 11' (yellow card) 45'; Cornthwaite 77'; Cássio 82'; Boogaard (yellow card) 90'	AFC Preview; AFC Report; AFC Reaction; Club Report; Summary	(yellow card) 30' Ryota; (red card) 32' Stoyanov; 55' Kazu; 75' Issei	Stadium: Hindmarsh Stadium; Attendance: 12,841; Referee: Subkhiddin Mohd Salleh (Malaysia)

30 March 2010 Match Day 4	Sanfrecce Hiroshima	1–0	Adelaide United	Hiroshima, Japan
20:30 ACDT	Hisato 45'; Tsubasa (yellow card) 77'	AFC Preview; AFC Report; AFC Reaction; Club Report; Summary	(yellow card) 34' Fyfe	Stadium: Hiroshima Big Arch; Attendance: 12,094; Referee: Ali Hamad Madhad Saif Al Badwawi (United Arab Emirates)

13 April 2010 Match Day 5	Pohang Steelers	0–0	Adelaide United	Pohang, South Korea
20:00 ACST	Jung Kyum (yellow card) 78'	AFC Preview; AFC Report; AFC Reaction; Club Report; Summary	(yellow card) 43' Jamieson; (yellow card) 45' Pantelis; (yellow card) 75' Hughes; (yellow card) 81' D. Mullen	Stadium: Steelyard Stadium; Attendance: 8,217; Referee: Ravshan Irmatov (Uzbekistan)

27 April 2010 Match Day 6	Adelaide United	0–1	Shandong Luneng	Adelaide, Australia
19:30 ACST	Leckie (yellow card) 37'; Marrone (yellow card) 84' van Dijk (yellow card) 90'; Griffiths (yellow card) 90+1'	AFC Preview; AFC Report; AFC Reaction; Club Report; Summary	(yellow card) 18' (goal) 52' Li Wei; (yellow card) 59' Gao Di; (yellow card) 90+1' Antar	Stadium: Hindmarsh Stadium; Attendance: 10,313; Referee: Nawaf Shukralla (Bahrain)

Round of 16

12 May 2010	Adelaide United	2 – 3 (a.e.t.)	Jeonbuk Hyundai Motors	Adelaide, Australia
19:30 ACST	Cássio (yellow card) 30' (yellow-red card) 120'; Cornthwaite 78' van Dijk 90+5'; Dodd (yellow card) 108'	AFC Preview; AFC Report; AFC Reaction; Club Report; Summary	38' (yellow card) 47' (goal) 87' Eninho; (yellow card) 45' Jong Hyun; (yellow card) 45' You Hwan; (yellow card) 90+4' Kyung Sun; (yellow card) 102' Seung Jo; 116' Dong Gook	Stadium: Hindmarsh Stadium; Attendance: 12,015; Referee: Abdulrahman Mohammed A M Hussain (Qatar)
