= 2008–09 Adelaide United FC season =

Adelaide United
2008–09 season
- Manager: Aurelio Vidmar Chairman Mel Patzwald
- A-League: 2nd
- Pre-Season Cup: 2nd
- AFC Champions League: Runners-up
- Top goalscorer: League: Cristiano (8); All: Cristiano (10)
- Highest home attendance: 23,002 (vs Sydney FC, 3 January 2009)
- Lowest home attendance: 7,832 (vs Wellington Phoenix, 30 August 2008)
- Average home league attendance: 12,500
- Biggest win: 6–1 (Wellington Phoenix)
- Biggest defeat: 3–0 (Central Coast Mariners)
Home colours	Away colours

The 2008–09 Adelaide United FC season was the club's fourth A-League season since the inception in the Australian football league since it first started in 2005. The club competed in the 2008–09 A-League, 2008 AFC Champions League and 2008 FIFA Club World Cup.

For the 2008–09 season, Adelaide United made some significant signings to strengthen the squad, most notably striker Cristiano from Willem II for two years on a free transfer. Another key signing to fill the vacancy left by the retirement of Richie Alagich was Alemão formerly of CA Juventus. Saša Ognenovski joined the club from Queensland Roar to help shore up the defence, midfielder Paul Reid joined from Brighton & Hove Albion F.C., while promising youngsters Scott Jamieson, Daniel Mullen, Mark Birighitti and Robert Younis also signed. Bobby Petta, Shaun Ontong, Milan Susak, Dez Giraldi and Robert Bajic were all released, Bruce Djite was sold for an A-League record of A$850,000 to Genclerbirligi, whilst Nathan Burns also transferred to pursue his European dreams, joining Greek first division outfit AEK Athens for A$500,000. Kristian Sarkies, Lucas Pantelis and Fabian Barbiero all had their contracts renewed.

This season, Adelaide United passed the one millionth spectator milestone of total crowds since the inception of the A-League. They reached this achievement when their 7,052nd fan passed through the gate, for the Round 3 match against Wellington. Adelaide United are only the third A-League club to do so thus far, the other two being Melbourne Victory and Sydney FC.

The round 18 A-League match against Sydney FC at the Adelaide Oval saw $23,002 donated to the Starlight Foundation as $1 from every ticket sold for the match went to the charity.

By the end of round 27, Adelaide had drawn level for first, equalling Melbourne's 38 points on the ladder, having needed to win 2–0 against the Central Coast Mariners away to win the premiership and only securing a 1–0 win. Adelaide was pushed down to second because of goal difference. The Reds, along with Melbourne, the Queensland Roar and Central Coast, proceeded to the finals where they lost 1–0 against Melbourne Victory in the grand final at Etihad Stadium, Melbourne.

An early highlight for the season was Adelaide's run to the final of the AFC Champions League against Gamba Osaka. Because of this performance, Adelaide participated in the 2008 FIFA Club World Cup. They played in the play-off round against Waitakere United on 11 December, defeating them 2–1. The Reds' next game was played against AFC Champions League rivals, Gamba Osaka, in the quarterfinal round on 14 December in Toyota, Japan. This match, despite Adelaide's grown skill since their first meeting with ACL champions, was won by Gamba Osaka 0–1. Adelaide's last appearance in the Club World Cup was against Al Ahly, from Egypt, to determine the fifth-placed club. The match was played on 18 December, and Adelaide defeated Al-Ahly 0–1.

This season also saw the introduction of the Adelaide United W-League team and the A-League National Youth League team. Former Adelaide player Richie Alagich, along with Michael Barnett and former Socceroos Tony Vidmar and Joe Mullen joined the coaching staff of these teams.

== Players ==
=== Squad information ===
==== First Team roster ====
Note: Flags indicate national team as defined under FIFA eligibility rules; some limited exceptions apply. Players may hold more than one non-FIFA nationality.

No.	Pos.	Nation	Player
1	GK	AUS	Daniel Beltrame
2	DF	AUS	Robert Cornthwaite
3	DF	BRA	Alemão
4	DF	AUS	Angelo Costanzo
5	DF	AUS	Michael Valkanis
6	DF	BRA	Cássio
7	MF	AUS	Lucas Pantelis
8	MF	AUS	Kristian Sarkies
9	FW	AUS	Paul Agostino
10	FW	BRA	Cristiano
13	MF	AUS	Travis Dodd (captain)
14	DF	AUS	Scott Jamieson

No.	Pos.	Nation	Player
15	MF	CIV	Jonas Salley
16	DF	AUS	Daniel Mullen
17	DF	AUS	Isyan Erdoğan
18	MF	AUS	Fabian Barbiero
19	DF	AUS	Saša Ognenovski
20	GK	AUS	Eugene Galeković
21	MF	AUS	Jason Spagnuolo
22	MF	BRA	Diego
24	MF	AUS	Paul Reid
25	FW	AUS	Robert Younis
28	MF	AUS	Rostyn Griffiths
30	GK	AUS	Mark Birighitti

==== Youth Team roster ====
Note: Flags indicate national team as defined under FIFA eligibility rules; some limited exceptions apply. Players may hold more than one non-FIFA nationality.

No.	Pos.	Nation	Player
—	GK	AUS	Lucas Andreucci
—	GK	AUS	Luke Ostybe
—	DF	AUS	Michael Doyle
—	DF	AUS	Michael Marrone
—	DF	AUS	Alex Sunasky
—	DF	AUS	Scott Weidnebach
—	MF	AUS	Joel Allwright
—	MF	AUS	Travis Anderson
—	MF	AUS	Andrew Ciarla

No.	Pos.	Nation	Player
—	MF	AUS	Joe Costa
—	MF	AUS	Osama Malik
—	MF	AUS	Matthew Mullen
—	MF	AUS	Ivan Pavlak
—	FW	AUS	Angelo Arambatsis
—	FW	AUS	Michael De Bono
—	FW	AUS	Francesco Monterosso
—	FW	AUS	Shane Tobias

=== Transfers ===
==== First Team ====
In

Name	Position	Moving from	Fee
(Australia) Mark Birighitti	Goalkeeper	(Australia) Australian Institute of Sport	Free
(Australia) Saša Ognenovski	Defender	(Australia) Queensland Roar	Free
(Australia) Daniel Mullen	Defender	(Australia) Australian Institute of Sport	Free
(Australia) Scott Jamieson	Defender	(England) Bolton Wanderers	Free
(Brazil) Alemão	Defender	(Brazil) CA Juventus	Free
(Australia) Paul Reid	Midfielder	(England) Brighton & Hove Albion	Free
(Brazil) Cristiano	Striker	(Netherlands) Willem II Tilburg	Free
(Australia) Robert Younis	Striker	(Australia) APIA Leichhardt	Free

Out

Name	Position	Moving to	Fee
(Australia) Robert Bajic	Goalkeeper	Released	–
(Australia) Milan Susak	Defender	Released	–
(Australia) Richie Alagich	Defender	Retired	–
(Netherlands) Bobby Petta	Midfielder	(Australia) Para Hills Knights	Free
(Australia) Shaun Ontong	Midfielder	(Australia) Newcastle Jets	Free
(Australia) Bruce Djite	Striker	(Turkey) Gençlerbirliği	€500,000
(Australia) Dez Giraldi	Striker	Released	–
(Australia) Nathan Burns	Striker	(Greece) AEK Athens	€290,000

==== Youth Team ====
In

Name	Position	Moving from	Fee
(Australia) Lucas Andreucci	Goalkeeper	(Australia) South Australian Sports Institute	Free
(Australia) Alex Sunasky	Defender	(Australia) Australian Institute of Sport	Free
(Australia) Michael Doyle	Defender	(Australia) Adelaide Galaxy	Free
(Australia) Scott Weidnebach	Defender	(Australia) Adelaide City	Free
(Australia) Michael Marrone	Defender	(Australia) Para Hills Knights	Free
(Australia) Joel Allwright	Midfielder	(Australia) Para Hills Knights	Free
(Australia) Andrew Ciarla	Midfielder	(Australia) North Eastern MetroStars	Free
(Australia) Matthew Mullen	Midfielder	(Australia) Australian Institute of Sport	Free
(Australia) Osama Malik	Midfielder	(Australia) Adelaide Raiders	Free
(Australia) Angelo Arambatsis	Striker	(Australia) Adelaide Blue Eagles	Free
(Australia) Francesco Monterosso	Striker	(Australia) South Australian Sports Institute	Free
(Australia) Shane Tobias	Striker	(Australia) Para Hills Knights	Free

Out

== Technical staff ==
Position	Name
Head coach	(Australia) Aurelio Vidmar
Assistant coach	(Australia) Phil Stubbins
Specialist coach	(Australia) Carl Veart
Goalkeeping coach	(Australia) Peter Blazincic
Youth Team Coach	(Australia) Joe Mullen
Youth Team Assistant Coach	(Australia) Tony Vidmar
Women's Team Coach	(Australia) Michael Barnett
Women's Team Assistant Coach	(Australia) Richie Alagich

== Statistics ==
=== Squad statistics ===
No.	Pos.	Name	A-League		A-League Finals		Pre-Season Cup		ACL		CWC		Total		Discipline	
No.	Pos.	Name	Apps	Goals	Apps	Goals	Apps	Goals	Apps	Goals	Apps	Goals	Apps	Goals	Yellow card	Red card
1	GK	(Australia) Daniel Beltrame	0	0	0	0	0	0	0	0	0	0	0	0	0	0
2	DF	(Australia) Robert Cornthwaite	17	2	3	0	3	0	10	2^{1}	3	0	35	4^{1}	10	0
3	DF	(Brazil) Alemão	18	2	2	0	3	0	0	0	2	0	25	2	2	0
4	DF	(Australia) Angelo Costanzo	12	0	0	0	3	0	10	0	1	0	26	0	8	0
5	DF	(Australia) Michael Valkanis	5	0	1	0	2	0	2	0	0	0	10	0	2	0
6	DF	(Brazil) Cássio	14	4	2	0	3	0	10	0	1	0	29	4	6	1
7	MF	(Australia) Lucas Pantelis	10	2	4	0	2	0	11	1	0	0	26	3	2	0
8	MF	(Australia) Kristian Sarkies	10	1	1	0	0	0	7	0	2	0	20	1	1	0
9	FW	(Australia) Paul Agostino	7	0	3	0	1	0	3	0	0	0	13	0	0	0
10	FW	(Brazil) Cristiano	21	8	4	0	3	2	6	1	3	1	36	12	4	0
11	MF	(Australia) Osama Malik**	0	0	0	0	0	0	0	0	2	0	2	0	0	0
13	MF	(Australia) Travis Dodd	20	7	4	0	3	0	12	3	2	1	40	11	6	0
14	DF	(Australia) Scott Jamieson	21	2	2	0	3	0	6	0	3	0	36	0	7	0
15	MF	(Australia) Jonas Salley	17	0	2	0	3	0	5	0	1	0	27	0	2	1
16	DF	(Australia) Daniel Mullen	9	0	4	0	2	0	3	0	3	1	20	1	1	0
17	DF	(Australia) Isyan Erdogan	0	0	0	0	0	0	0	0	0	0	0	0	0	0
18	MF	(Australia) Fabian Barbiero	15	1	4	1	3	0	6	1	2	0	29	3	6	0
19	DF	(Australia) Saša Ognenovski	20	3	4	0	1	0	9	0	2	0	35	3	12	0
20	GK	(Australia) Eugene Galekovic	18	0	4	0	3	0	11	0	3	0	38	0	2	0
21	MF	(Australia) Jason Spagnuolo	10	0	0	0	3	0	9	0	1	0	23	0	2	0
22	MF	(Brazil) Diego	8	0	0	0	1	0	11	4	2	0	22	4	3	0
23	DF	(Australia) Michael Marrone	1	0	1	0	0	0	0	0	1	0	3	0	0	0
24	MF	(Australia) Paul Reid	18	1	4	0	0	0	5	0	3	0	29	1	3	0
25	FW	(Australia) Robert Younis	12	0	0	0	2	0	0	0	3	0	17	0	1	0
26	MF	(Australia) Matthew Mullen	1	0	0	0	0	0	0	0	0	0	1	0	0	0
28	MF	(Australia) Rostyn Griffiths	0	0	2	0	0	0	0	0	0	0	2	0	1	0
30	GK	(Australia) Mark Birighitti	3	0	0	0	0	0	1	0	0	0	4	0	1	0
——	DF	(Australia) Richie Alagich*	0	0	0	0	0	0	6	1	0	0	6	1	1	0
——	FW	(Australia) Bruce Djite*	0	0	0	0	0	0	3	1	0	0	3	1	0	0
——	DF	(Australia) Milan Susak*	0	0	0	0	0	0	2	0	0	0	2	0	0	0
——	FW	(Australia) Nathan Burns*	0	0	0	0	0	0	6	0	0	0	6	0	0	0
——	FW	(Australia) Dez Giraldi*	0	0	0	0	0	0	5	0	0	0	5	0	0	0
——	MF	(Australia) Shaun Ontong*	0	0	0	0	0	0	2	0	0	0	2	0	0	0

^{1} – does not include own goal(s)
* – player(s) who competed in the ACL but not in the 2008–09 A-League season or the CWC
** – player(s) who competed in the CWC but not in the 2008–09 A-League season or the ACL

=== Goal scorers ===
Total	Player		Goals per Round																				
Total	Player		1	2	3	4	5	6	7	8	9	10	11	12	13	14	15	16	17	18	19	20	21
8	(Brazil)	Cristiano			2			2	1							2							1
7	(Australia)	Travis Dodd	1	1					1		1	1		1		1							
4	(Brazil)	Cássio										1				2				1			
3	(Australia)	Saša Ognenovski												1	1	1							
2	(Australia)	Robert Cornthwaite							1	1													
2	(Brazil)	Alemão									1									1			
2	(Australia)	Lucas Pantelis			1																1		
1	(Australia)	Kristian Sarkies																	1				
1	(Australia)	Fabian Barbiero																			1		
1	(Australia)	Paul Reid																				1	

A goal was scored from a penalty kick
Two goals were scored from penalty kicks

=== Attendance at home games ===
Round	Date	Opponent	Score AUFC – Away	Attendance	Weekday
1	17 August 2008	Perth Glory	1–0	10,510	Sunday
3	30 August 2008	Wellington Phoenix	3–0	7,832	Saturday
6	27 September 2008	Newcastle Jets	2–0	8,111	Saturday
7	3 October 2008	Central Coast Mariners	3–3	9,074	Friday
9	26 October 2008	Perth Glory	2–1	10,126	Sunday
10	31 October 2008	Melbourne Victory	2–3	13,191	Friday
12	22 November 2008	Sydney FC	2–0	9,509	Saturday
14	5 December 2008	Wellington Phoenix	6–1	9,442	Friday
16	14 January 2009	Queensland Roar	0–0	14,450	Wednesday
18	3 January 2009	Sydney FC	2–0	23,002	Saturday
19	9 January 2009	Newcastle Jets	2–0	13,585	Friday
SF1	7 February 2009	Melbourne Victory	0–2	14,119	Saturday
PF	21 February 2009	Queensland Roar	1–0	8,472	Saturday

== Competitions ==
=== Pre-season ===
Round	Date	Home team	Score	Away team	Attendance	Stadium
1	20 July 2008	Melbourne Victory	1–2; Cristiano 33', 90'	Adelaide United	4,720	Aurora Stadium
2	26 July 2008	Newcastle Jets	0–0	Adelaide United	2,756	Baddeley Park
3	2 August 2008	Adelaide United	0–0	Perth Glory	3,000	Vansittart Park

=== A-League ===
==== League table ====
Pos	Team	Pld	W	D	L	GF	GA	GD	Pts	Qualification
1	Melbourne Victory (C)	21	12	2	7	39	27	+12	38	Qualification for 2010 AFC Champions League group stage and Finals series
2	Adelaide United	21	11	5	5	31	19	+12	38	Qualification for 2010 AFC Champions League group stage and Finals series
3	Queensland Roar	21	10	6	5	36	25	+11	36	Qualification for Finals series
4	Central Coast Mariners	21	7	7	7	35	32	+3	28	Qualification for Finals series
5	Sydney FC	21	7	5	9	33	32	+1	26	
6	Wellington Phoenix	21	7	5	9	23	31	−8	26	
7	Perth Glory	21	6	4	11	31	44	−13	22	
8	Newcastle Jets	21	4	6	11	21	39	−18	18	

Source: ultimatealeague.com
Rules for classification: 1) points; 2) goal difference; 3) number of goals scored.
(C) Champions

==== Matches ====
Round	Date	Home team	Score	Away team	Attendance	Stadium
1	17 August 2008	Adelaide United	1–0; Dodd 41'	Perth Glory	10,510	Hindmarsh Stadium
2	24 August 2008	Queensland Roar	1–1; Dodd 8' (pen)	Adelaide United	12,761	Suncorp Stadium
3	30 August 2008	Adelaide United	3 -0; Pantelis 15'; Cristiano 49', 60'	Wellington Phoenix	7,832	Hindmarsh Stadium
4	12 September 2008	Melbourne Victory	1–0	Adelaide United	24,812	Telstra Dome
5	20 September 2008	Sydney FC	3–0	Adelaide United	12,462	Sydney Football Stadium
6	27 September 2008	Adelaide United	2–0; Cristiano 72', 60'	Newcastle Jets	8,111	Hindmarsh Stadium
7	3 October 2008	Adelaide United	3–3; Dodd 7' (pen); Cornthwaite 19'; Cristiano 50'	Central Coast Mariners	9,074	Hindmarsh Stadium
8	17 October 2008	Queensland Roar	0–1; Cornthwaite 60'	Adelaide United	11,117	Suncorp Stadium
9	26 October 2008	Adelaide United	2–1; Alemão 80'; Dodd 82' (pen)	Perth Glory	10,126	Hindmarsh Stadium
10	31 October 2008	Adelaide United	2–3; Dodd 28' (pen); Cássio 67'	Melbourne Victory	13,191	Hindmarsh Stadium
11	15 November 2008	Central Coast Mariners	3–0	Adelaide United	7,865	Bluetongue Stadium
12	22 November 2008	Adelaide United	2–0; Ognenovski 45+2'; Dodd 78'	Sydney FC	9,509	Hindmarsh Stadium
13	30 November 2008	Newcastle Jets	1–1; Ognenovski 90+4'	Adelaide United	7,136	Energy Australia Stadium
14	5 December 2008	Adelaide United	6–1; Ognenovski 21'; Cristiano 43', 74'; Cassio 47', 70'; Dodd 90+1'	Wellington Phoenix	9,442	Hindmarsh Stadium
15	6 January 2009	Melbourne Victory	1–0	Adelaide United	27,196	Telstra Dome
16	14 January 2009	Adelaide United	0–0	Queensland Roar	14,450	Hindmarsh Stadium
17	26 December 2008	Perth Glory	0–1; Sarkies 40'	Adelaide United	12,581	Members Equity Stadium
18	3 January 2009	Adelaide United	2–0; Cassio 45'; Alemão 82'	Sydney FC	23,002	Adelaide Oval
19	9 January 2009	Adelaide United	2–0; Barbiero 23'; Pantelis 74'	Newcastle Jets	13,585	Hindmarsh Stadium
20	18 January 2009	Wellington Phoenix	1–1; Reid 9'	Adelaide United	8,241	Westpac Stadium
21	25 January 2009	Central Coast Mariners	0–1; Cristiano 82'	Adelaide United	12,351	Bluetongue Stadium

==== Finals series ====
Final	Date	Home team	Score	Away team	Attendance	Stadium
Semi (1)	7 February 2009	Adelaide United	0–2	Melbourne Victory	14,119	Hindmarsh Stadium
Semi (2)	14 February 2009	Melbourne Victory	4–0	Adelaide United	34,736	Telstra Dome
Preliminary	21 February 2009	Adelaide United	1–0	Queensland Roar	8,472	Hindmarsh Stadium
Grand	28 February 2009	Melbourne Victory	1–0	Adelaide United	53,273	Telstra Dome

=== FIFA Club World Cup ===
Final	Date	Team 1	Score	Team 2	Attendance	Stadium
Play-off	11 December 2008	Adelaide United	2–1; Mullen 39'; Dodd 83'	Waitakere United	19,777	National Stadium, Tokyo
Quarter	14 December 2008	Adelaide United	0–1	Gamba Osaka	38,141	Toyota Stadium, Toyota
Fifth Place	18 December 2008	Al Ahly	0–1; Cristiano 7'	Adelaide United	35,154	International Stadium Yokohama
