= Mark Birighitti =

Australian footballer (born 1991)

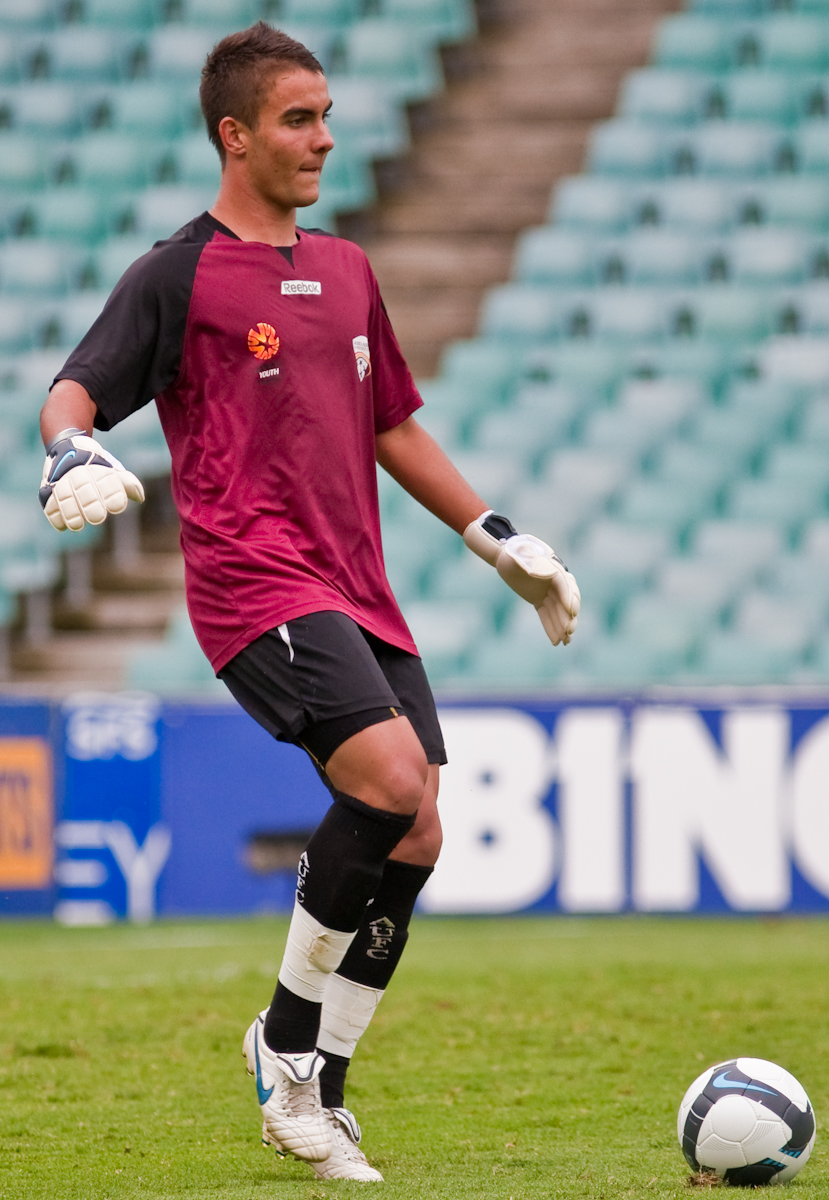
- Birighitti playing for Adelaide United Youth in 2009

Personal information
- Full name: Mark Romano Birighitti
- Date of birth: 17 April 1991 (age 35)
- Place of birth: Perth, Western Australia
- Height: 1.89 m (6 ft 2 in)
- Position: Goalkeeper

Team information
- Current team: Olympic Kingsway

Youth career
- ECU Joondalup
- Perth
- 2006–2007: WA NTC
- 2007–2008: AIS
- 2008–2009: Adelaide United

Senior career*
Years	Team	Apps	(Gls)
2008	AIS	18	(0)
2008–2012	Adelaide United	8	(0)
2012–2016	Newcastle Jets	77	(0)
2015	→ Varese (loan)	4	(0)
2016–2017	Swansea City	0	(0)
2017–2018	NAC Breda	16	(0)
2018–2019	Melbourne City	0	(0)
2019–2022	Central Coast Mariners	79	(0)
2022–2024	Dundee United	26	(0)
2024	→ Kilmarnock (loan)	0	(0)
2025	Perth SC	10	(0)
2025–2026	Perth Glory	0	(0)
2026–	Olympic Kingsway	1	(0)

International career^{‡}
2007	Australia U17	3	(0)
2008–2011	Australia U20	33	(0)
2012	Australia U23	2	(0)
2013	Australia	1	(0)
- * Club domestic league appearances and goals as of 6 July 2026 ‡ National team caps and goals as of 15 November 2017

Mark Romano Birighitti (Italian: [roˈmaːno biriˈɡitti]; born 17 April 1991) is an Australian professional soccer player who plays as a goalkeeper for Olympic Kingsway in the NPL WA.

Born in Perth, Birighitti played youth football at the Australian Institute of Sport before making his professional debut for Adelaide United. In 2012, he moved to Newcastle Jets and spent time on loan to Italian club Varese in 2015. In 2016, Birighitti left Newcastle to again move to Europe, firstly with Swansea City and then NAC Breda. He returned to the A-League in 2018 with Melbourne City before moving to Central Coast Mariners a year later. He then signed for Dundee United in 2022.

Birighitti has played once for the Australian national team, at the 2013 EAFF East Asian Cup. He has also represented Australia's youth teams on many occasions, including at the 2011 FIFA U-20 World Cup and winning the 2010 AFF U-19 Youth Championship.

== Club career ==
=== Adelaide United ===
Birighitti started his career at the AIS before moving to Adelaide United in 2008. He made his first team debut against Queensland Roar on 17 October 2008 helping Adelaide to a 1–0 win. Aurelio Vidmar praised the young goalkeeper after the match saying "I think Birighitti played well he's got a really good future, he had big shoes to fill and I think he did an outstanding job tonight."

His second successive A-League start came against Perth Glory at Hindmarsh Stadium after Adelaide's number one goalkeeper, 28-year-old Eugene Galekovic, was injured during the Asian Champions League match against FC Bunyodkor. Despite conceding the match's first goal at the near post, Birighitti played his part in the 2–1 win taking Adelaide to the top of the league table.

With Galekovic again ruled out with injury Birighitti started the second leg of the 2008 AFC Champions League Final against Gamba Osaka on 12 November 2008; Adelaide lost the match 2–0. He injured his ankle after falling awkwardly in a training session on 17 December 2008 ruling him out of the remaining A-League 2008-09 season.

=== Newcastle Jets ===
On 17 January 2012 it was announced he had signed a two-year contract with A-League club Newcastle Jets starting post the 2012 AFC Champions League group stage. He quickly became the first choice goalkeeper for the Newcastle Jets, edging out Ben Kennedy and Jack Duncan. In late 2013 he signed a contract extension with the Jets until the end of the 2015–16 season.

On 24 March 2014, Birighitti flew to Germany to discuss a possible transfer to Bundesliga club Bayer Leverkusen. After failing to secure a contract with Bayer Leverkusen he then came back to the Jets for the 2014–15 season.

In October 2015, Birighitti was involved in an on-field collision with Sydney FC striker Shane Smeltz. Birighitti suffered multiple broken teeth and required facial surgery after the incident. He returned to action within weeks, missing only one A-League game.

==== Loan to Varese ====
On 27 January 2015, Birighitti joined Serie B club Varese on a six-month loan deal. He made his league debut for Varese in a 1–0 away loss to Vicenza on 25 April 2015.

=== Swansea City ===
On 18 July 2016, Birighitti joined Premier League side Swansea City on a two-year deal. After the 2016–17 season, Birighitti went on trial at Dutch side Willem II, following a lack of opportunities at Swansea.

=== NAC Breda ===
On 1 September 2017, Birighitti joined Eredivisie side NAC Breda on a two-year deal and played the full 90 minutes in NAC Breda's first ever away win in an Eredivisie match against Feyenoord, in which he also stopped a penalty. He departed in the summer of 2018.

=== Melbourne City ===
On 11 September 2018, Birighitti joined Australian A-League side Melbourne City on a three-year deal. Playing the majority of the season as understudy to Eugene Galekovic, he negotiated a mutual release from the remainder of his contract.

=== Central Coast Mariners ===
In August 2019, Birighitti joined Central Coast Mariners on a one-year contract.

=== Dundee United ===
On 21 July 2022, Dundee United announced the signing of Mark Birighitti on a two-year deal. He spent at week as an emergency loan goalkeeper at Kilmarnock in January 2024. He played 26 games for Dundee United and left at the end of the 2023/2024 season.

=== Return to Perth ===
He left Scotland and returned to Perth, Australia in 2025. He initially joined Perth SC in a dual role as a senior player and as a goal keeping coach for their junior system. While he remained in his coaching role at Perth SC, he joined Perth Glory on a 1 year professional contract. A week before the 2024/25 A-League Men season was to begin he suffered a knee injury in training that required surgery and kept him out of the playing squad until February 2026. He he returned to the substitutes bench for three matches before going out of the squad again. He did not play any matches for Perth Glory before his contract expired and he was released by the club.

== International career ==
Birighitti was selected to represent the Australian under-20 squad at the 2010 AFC U-19 Championship.

He made his debut for the senior Australian side in their final match of the 2013 EAFF East Asian Cup against China, a 4–3 loss.

== Career statistics ==
As of 19 July 2026

Club	Season	League			Cup		Continental		Total	
Club	Season	Division	Apps	Goals	Apps	Goals	Apps	Goals	Apps	Goals
AIS	2008	Victorian Premier League	18	0	0	0	0	0	18	0
Adelaide United	2008–09	A-League	3	0	0	0	1	0	4	0
Adelaide United	2009–10	A-League	0	0	0	0	0	0	0	0
Adelaide United	2010–11	A-League	3	0	0	0	0	0	3	0
Adelaide United	2011–12	A-League	2	0	0	0	0	0	2	0
Adelaide United	Total		8	0	0	0	1	0	9	0
Newcastle Jets	2012–13	A-League	22	0	0	0	0	0	22	0
Newcastle Jets	2013–14	A-League	23	0	0	0	0	0	23	0
Newcastle Jets	2014–15	A-League	6	0	0	0	0	0	6	0
Newcastle Jets	2015–16	A-League	26	0	1	0	0	0	27	0
Newcastle Jets	Total		77	0	1	0	0	0	78	0
Varese (loan)	2014–15	Serie B	4	0	0	0	0	0	4	0
Swansea City	2016–17	Premier League	0	0	0	0	0	0	0	0
NAC Breda	2017–18	Eredivisie	15	0	1	0	0	0	16	0
NAC Breda	2018–19	Eredivisie	1	0	0	0	0	0	1	0
NAC Breda	Total		16	0	1	0	0	0	17	0
Melbourne City	2018–19	A-League	0	0	0	0	0	0	0	0
Central Coast Mariners	2019–20	A-League	26	0	3	0	0	0	29	0
Central Coast Mariners	2020–21	A-League	27	0	0	0	0	0	27	0
Central Coast Mariners	2021–22	A-League	26	0	5	0	0	0	31	0
Central Coast Mariners	Total		79	0	8	0	0	0	87	0
Dundee United	2022–23	Scottish Premiership	26	0	2	0	2 (Note: Appearances in UEFA Conference League)	0	30	0
Kilmarnock (loan)	2023–24	Scottish Premiership	0	0	0	0	0	0	0	0
Perth SC	2025	NPL WA	10	0	1	0	0	0	11	0
Perth Glory	2025–26	A-League Men	0	0	0	0	0	0	0	0
Olympic Kingsway	2026	NPL WA	1	0	0	0	0	0	1	0
Career total			239	0	13	0	3	0	255	0

== Honours ==
Australia U20

- AFF U-19 Youth Championship: 2010

Individual

- Mariners Medal: 2019–20
- A-League All Star: 2014
- PFA A-League Team of the Season: 2015–16, 2020–21, 2021–22
- A-League Goalkeeper of the Year: 2020–21, 2021–22
