= Eugene Galekovic =

Australian soccer player (born 1981)

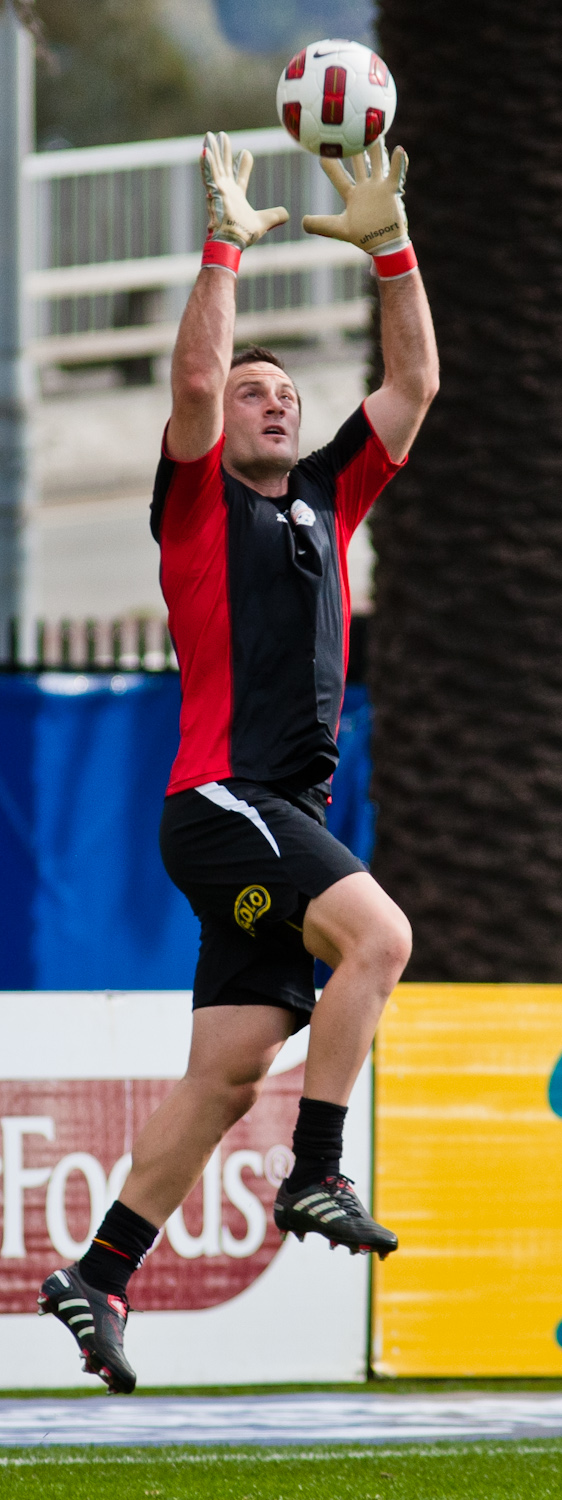
- Galekovic with Adelaide United in 2010

Personal information
- Full name: Eugen Josip Galekovic
- Date of birth: 12 June 1981 (age 45)
- Place of birth: Melbourne, Australia
- Height: 1.88 m (6 ft 2 in)
- Position: Goalkeeper

Team information
- Current team: Adelaide United (goalkeeper coach)

Youth career
- 1993–1997: Chelsea Hajduk
- 1997–1998: Bulleen Lions

Senior career*
Years	Team	Apps	(Gls)
1999–2000	Melbourne Knights	0	(0)
2000–2001	Eastern Pride	11	(0)
2002–2004	South Melbourne	37	(0)
2004–2005	Beira-Mar	2	(0)
2005–2007	Melbourne Victory	15	(0)
2007–2017	Adelaide United	238	(0)
2017–2019	Melbourne City	35	(0)
Total		338	(0)

International career
2003–2004	Australia U23	4	(0)
2009–2015	Australia	8	(0)

Managerial career
- 2019–: Adelaide United (goalkeeper coach)
Medal record
Representing Australia
Men's Association football
AFC Asian Cup
Winner	2015 Australia
- * Club domestic league appearances and goals

Eugen Josip Galekovic (/- ˈjɒsɪp ɡəˈlɛkəvɪtʃ/ YOS-ip gə-LEK-ə-vitch; Croatian: Eugen Josip Galeković, pronounced [êuːdʒin jǒsip ɡalêːkoːʋitɕ]; born 12 June 1981) is an Australian former professional soccer player who played as a goalkeeper. He is the current goalkeeper and assistant coach for Adelaide United. Having played over 250 games in the A-League, 238 of those for Adelaide United, he is considered one of the greatest A-League goalkeepers of all time, and one of Adelaide United's greatest players.

== Biography ==
=== Club career ===
Galekovic's junior football was mostly played at Chelsea Hajduk in Melbourne's south-eastern suburbs.

Galekovic played school football for St Bede's College.

Galekovic started his career with Morwell based National Soccer League (NSL) side Gippsland Falcons as a 19-year-old in December 2000 before signing with Australian powerhouse South Melbourne the following season.

=== South Melbourne FC ===
Galekovic was second choice keeper in his early seasons at South playing behind Socceroos keeper Dean Anastasiadis. He made his debut in 2002 against rivals Melbourne Knights at Lakeside Stadium. After a string of impressive performances for his age, Galekovic claimed his spot as South's number 1 for the 2002 season ahead of Michael Theo.

At his time at South, Galekovic made 37 appearances and kept 17 clean sheets in the process. Following his performances for the club, he received a maiden Olyroos selection.

He stayed with South Melbourne until the NSL's closure in 2003–04 where at season's end he secured a place on the list of Beira Mar in Portugal on the back of holding the number one spot for Australia's Olympic football campaign in Athens in 2004.

Galekovic was South's keeper in their last ever national league game in 2004 when South Melbourne Lost 2-1 to Adelaide United in an elimination final by golden goal.

=== Melbourne Victory ===
The period at Beira Mar was generally unsuccessful for Galekovic, with him seeing little first team action and thus, he returned to Melbourne to sign for the city's inaugural A-League side Melbourne Victory for season 2005–06, debuting in the opening match against Sydney FC.

Galekovic played 11 matches for the season in an unusual goalkeeper rotation policy employed by Melbourne manager Ernie Merrick in which the other 10 matches saw teammate and former South Melbourne compatriot Michael Theoklitos in goal. Galekovic was second choice keeper for the Victory in the 2006–07 season but an injury to Theoklitos gave Galekovic his first start of the season in the round 13 clash against Queensland Roar at Suncorp Stadium.

=== Adelaide United ===
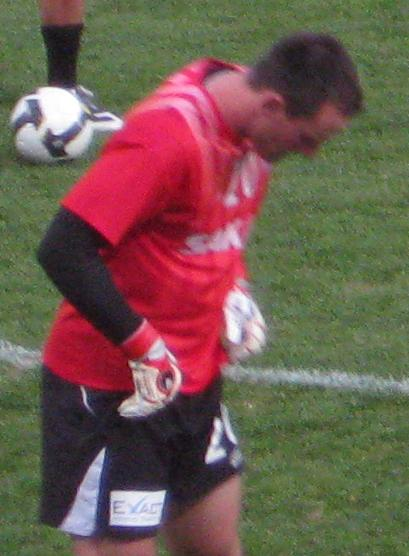
Galekovic warming up for Adelaide United in 2008.

On 30 October, Eugene signed for Melbourne Victory rivals Adelaide United as a replacement for injured keeper Daniel Beltrame and made his debut against the Queensland Roar at Hindmarsh Stadium. On 20 January 2008, Galekovic kept his first clean sheet for Adelaide in a 2–0 win over Brisbane at Hindmarsh Stadium. On 27 December 2008 Galekovic made a string of impressive saves to ensure Adelaide kept its 1–0 advantage over Perth Glory and in the process giving him his fifth clean sheet of the league season.

In February 2010, Galekovic won the Adelaide United Player of the Year Award.

In the middle of the 2011–12 A-League Jon McKain resigned his role as captain at Adelaide United. It was then announced that Eugene Galekovic became captain.

On 11 March 2016 Galekovic reached 250 appearances despite a 1–0 defeat to Melbourne City.

=== Melbourne City ===
On 16 June 2017 Galekovic signed a two-year deal with Melbourne City. He played 35 league games for Melbourne City before then announcing his retirement at the end of the 2018–19 season.

=== Return to Adelaide United ===
Following the conclusion of his contract with Melbourne City, Galekovic returned to Adelaide United to commence a role as the club's goalkeeper coach in 2019.

=== International ===
Galekovic was called up for Australia in a preliminary squad with teammates Scott Jamieson and Paul Reid after impressive performances in the A-League and the Asian Champions League. He made his first senior international football debut for Australia on 28 January 2009 in an AFC Asian Cup qualifying match versus Indonesia. He was disappointing in his last outing against Kuwait, by letting in two poor goals after Australia conceded a 2–0 advantage. After Brad Jones left the 2010 FIFA World Cup 23-man squad to help his son battle leukaemia, he was called in as a replacement, after missing selection in the 23-man squad first time around. Eugene was selected by Holger Osieck for a 2013 EAFF East Asian Cup qualifying tournament. He started the first match against hosts Hong Kong and came up with audacious stops to save Australia from humiliation as they won 1–0 with a solo effort from Brett Emerton. The other game that Galekovic was a part of a 9–0 thrashing of Guam. After a string good performances for Adelaide United, Holger Osieck selected Eugene Galekovic as part of his 23-man squad for the decisive 2014 FIFA World Cup qualification (AFC) match against Oman.

He was part of the Australia squad for the 2014 World Cup, but did not play.

== Career statistics ==
Appearances and goals by club, season and competition
Club	Season	League (Note: Includes A-League final series.)		Cup		Continental (Note: Includes FIFA Club World Cup; AFC Champions League statistics are included in season commencing after group stages (i.e. 2008 ACL in 2008–09 A-League season etc.).)		Total	
Club	Season	Apps	Goals	Apps	Goals	Apps	Goals	Apps	Goals
Eastern Pride	2000–01	11	1	–		–		11	1
South Melbourne	2001–02	0	0	–		–		0	0
South Melbourne	2002–03	15	7	–		–		15	7
South Melbourne	2003–04	22	10	–		–		22	10
South Melbourne	Total	37	17	0	0	0	0	37	17
Beira-Mar	2004–05	2	0	–		–		2	0
Melbourne Victory	2005–06	11	4	2	1	–		13	5
Melbourne Victory	2006–07	4	1	4	1	–		8	2
Melbourne Victory	2007–08	–		1	0	–		1	0
Melbourne Victory	Total	15	5	7	2	0	0	22	7
Adelaide United	2007–08	11	1	–		–		11	1
Adelaide United	2008–09	22	10	3	2	14	7	39	19
Adelaide United	2009–10	27	6	–		7	3	34	9
Adelaide United	2010–11	29	9	–		–		29	9
Adelaide United	2011–12	25	3	–		10	6	35	9
Adelaide United	2012–13	25	8	–		–		25	8
Adelaide United	2013–14	28	8	–		–		28	8
Adelaide United	2014–15	26	7	3	2	–		29	9
Adelaide United	2015–16	22	12	3	0	1	0	26	12
Adelaide United	2016–17	23	3	1	0	0	0	24	3
Adelaide United	Total	238	67	10	4	32	16	280	87
Melbourne City	2017–18	8	3	1	0	0	0	9	3
Melbourne City	2018–19	10	4	3	2	0	0	13	6
Melbourne City	Total	18	7	4	2	0	0	22	9
Career total		321	97	21	8	32	16	374	121

== Honours ==
=== Player ===
Melbourne Victory

- A-League Championship: 2006–07
- A-League Premiership: 2006–07

Adelaide United

- FFA Cup: 2014
- A-League Premiership: 2015–16
- A-League Championship: 2015–16

Australia

- AFC Asian Cup: 2015

=== Individual ===
- A-League Goalkeeper of the Year: 2008–09, 2009–10, 2013–14, 2014–15
- Adelaide United Club Champion: 2008–2009, 2009–10
- Adelaide United Player's Player of the Year: 2008–2009, 2009–10, 2011–12
- A-League PFA Team of the Season: 2008–09, 2009–10, 2012–13, 2013–14, 2014–15
- A-League All Stars: 2014
- PFA A-League Team of the Decade: 2005–15

Individual Records

- Most Goalkeeper of the Year Awards: 4
