= 2014 A-League All Stars Game =

- Event: A-League All Stars Game
A-League All Stars	Juventus
(Australia)	(Italy)
2	3
- Date: 10 August 2014
- Venue: ANZ Stadium, Sydney, New South Wales
- Man of the Match: Thomas Broich (A-League All Stars)
- Referee: Felix Brych (Germany)
- Attendance: 55,364

The 2014 A-League All Stars Game was a soccer match that took place on 10 August 2014 at ANZ Stadium in Sydney, contested between the A-League All Stars and Italian Serie A champions Juventus.

== Background ==
On 20 December 2013, it was confirmed that Juventus would compete against the All-Stars team on 10 August 2014, hosted in Sydney. On 18 February 2014, it was announced that former Juventus and current Sydney FC captain Alessandro Del Piero would captain the All-Stars squad; this was the first time Del Piero had played a match against his former club. On 7 April 2014, it was announced Adelaide United coach Josep Gombau would coach the All-Stars squad, chosen by a fan vote .

Matthew Spiranovic was ruled out of the A-League All Stars squad due to an ankle injury.

== A-League All Stars players ==
Pos.	Player	Club
GK	(Australia) Mark Birighitti	Newcastle Jets
GK	(Australia) Eugene Galekovic	Adelaide United
DF	(Malta) Manny Muscat	Wellington Phoenix
DF	(Australia) Jade North	Brisbane Roar
DF	(Australia) Joshua Rose	Central Coast Mariners
DF	(New Zealand) Storm Roux	Central Coast Mariners
DF	(Australia) Matt Smith	Brisbane Roar
DF	(Australia) Michael Thwaite	Perth Glory
MF	(Iraq) Ali Abbas	Sydney FC
MF	(Germany) Thomas Broich	Brisbane Roar
MF	(Argentina) Marcelo Carrusca	Adelaide United
MF	(Brazil) Gui Finkler	Melbourne Victory
MF	(Netherlands) Youssouf Hersi	Perth Glory
MF	(Scotland) Nick Montgomery	Central Coast Mariners
MF	(Spain) Albert Riera	Wellington Phoenix
FW	(Albania) Besart Berisha	Melbourne Victory
FW	(Italy) Alessandro Del Piero (C)	Sydney FC
FW	(Australia) Bernie Ibini	Sydney FC
FW	(Australia) Tomi Juric	Western Sydney Wanderers
FW	(Australia) David Williams	Melbourne City

== Match ==
=== Details ===
10 August 2014
19:30 AEST

A-League All Stars	2–3	(Italy) Juventus
Carrusca 9'; Juric 76'	Report; Summary	Llorente 58'; Pogba 87'; Pepe 90+3'

ANZ Stadium, Sydney
Attendance: 55,364
Referee: Felix Brych (Germany)

A-League All Stars	Juventus

GK	1	(Australia) Eugene Galekovic		(substituted off) 71'
DF	3	(Australia) Joshua Rose
DF	16	(Australia) Jade North		(substituted off) 65'
DF	2	(Australia) Matt Smith
DF	5	(Malta) Manny Muscat		(substituted off) 76'
MF	13	(Spain) Albert Riera
MF	12	(Argentina) Marcelo Carrusca		(substituted off) 65'
MF	22	(Germany) Thomas Broich		(substituted off) 76'
MF	10	(Italy) Alessandro Del Piero (c)		(substituted off) 65'
FW	11	(Australia) Bernie Ibini		(substituted off) 65'
FW	8	(Albania) Besart Berisha		(substituted off) 76'
Substitutes:
GK	18	(Australia) Mark Birighitti		(substituted on) 71'
DF	4	(Australia) Michael Thwaite		(substituted on) 65'
MF	6	(Scotland) Nick Montgomery		(substituted on) 65'
MF	7	(Brazil) Gui Finkler		(substituted on) 76'
FW	9	(Australia) Tomi Juric		(substituted on) 76'
DF	14	(New Zealand) Storm Roux		(substituted on) 76'
MF	15	(Australia) David Williams	(yellow card) 70'	(substituted on) 65'
MF	17	(Netherlands) Youssouf Hersi		(substituted on) 65'
MF	20	(Iraq) Ali Abbas
Manager:
(Spain) Josep Gombau

GK	1	(Italy) Gianluigi Buffon (c)	(substituted off) 71'
DF	33	(France) Patrice Evra	(substituted off) 71'
DF	19	(Italy) Leonardo Bonucci
DF	4	(Uruguay) Martín Cáceres
DF	26	(Switzerland) Stephan Lichtsteiner
MF	5	(Italy) Angelo Ogbonna
MF	21	(Italy) Andrea Pirlo
MF	8	(Italy) Claudio Marchisio	(substituted off) 85'
MF	6	(France) Paul Pogba
FW	10	(Argentina) Carlos Tevez
FW	14	(Spain) Fernando Llorente	(substituted off) 86'
Substitutes:
GK	30	(Italy) Marco Storari	(substituted on) 71'
GK	34	(Brazil) Rubinho
GK	77	(Italy) Emil Audero
DF	3	(Italy) Giorgio Chiellini
MF	7	(Italy) Simone Pepe	(substituted on) 85'
FW	11	(France) Kingsley Coman
MF	12	(Italy) Sebastian Giovinco	(substituted on) 86'
DF	16	(Italy) Marco Motta
MF	20	(Italy) Simone Padoin
MF	22	(Ghana) Kwadwo Asamoah	(substituted on) 71'
MF	24	(Italy) Mattia Vitale
FW	36	(Spain) Sergio Buenacasa
MF	37	(Argentina) Roberto Pereyra
MF	39	(Italy) Luca Marrone
Manager:
(Italy) Massimiliano Allegri

Man of the Match:
Thomas Broich (A-League All Stars)

=== Statistics ===
	A-League All Stars	Juventus
Goals scored	2	3
Total shots	13	15
Shots on target	5	7
Ball possession	54.9%	45.1%
Corner kicks	8	5
Fouls committed	13	13
Offsides	1	2
Yellow cards	1	0
Second caution red cards	0	0
Direct red cards	0	0

== Broadcasting ==
In Australia, the match was broadcast live by the Seven Network on their channel 7mate.

== Sponsorship ==
A-League All Stars partners:

- Foxtel
- Telstra
- NSW Government
- BLK
