= Ney Fabiano =

Brazilian footballer

Personal information
- Full name: Ney Fabiano de Oliveira
- Date of birth: 9 February 1979 (age 47)
- Place of birth: São José dos Campos, Brazil
- Height: 1.78 m (5 ft 10 in)
- Position: Striker

Youth career
- 1994: Internacional

Senior career*
Years	Team	Apps	(Gls)
1995–1996	Internacional	3	(0)
1996–1997	São Paulo-RS	9	(2)
1997–2000	Cruzeiro	49	(19)
2000–2001	Atlético Sorocaba	26	(14)
2001–2002	Nacional-AM	17	(8)
2002	Palmeiras	22	(6)
2002–2003	Bahia	26	(15)
2003	Juventus-SP	32	(12)
2003–2004	FC RW Rankweil	10	(4)
2004–2005	União Bandeirante	16	(4)
2006	São José	18	(5)
2007	TTM Phichit	19	(18)
2008	Chonburi	6	(2)
2008–2009	Melbourne Victory	30	(6)
2010	Bangkok Glass	13	(2)
2010–2011	Chonburi	32	(17)
2012	Wuachon United	5	(2)
2012–2013	Suphanburi	19	(7)
2014–2015	Phuket	16	(6)
2015–2016	Khon Kaen	16	(9)
Total		384	(158)
- * Club domestic league appearances and goals

Ney Fabiano de Oliveira (born 9 February 1979), is a Brazilian former footballer.

== Club career ==
Ney Fabiano spent the early part of his career playing for various clubs in Brazil, before moving to Austria for a spell. Fabiano then moved to ply his trade in Thailand where he signed with Thailand Tobacco Monopoly FC. In his first season in Thai football he became the top goal scorer in the 2007 Thai Premier League (TPL) with 18 goals, despite his team’s 6th-place finish. After showing his ability in front of goal, Chonburi FC snapped him up for their 2008 AFC Champions League campaign.

=== Melbourne Victory ===
On 23 May 2008, Australian A-League club Melbourne Victory announced that, after two impressive performances against them in the 2008 AFC Champions League (including a goal each over the two legs played), they had signed Fabiano on a two-year deal. Shortly after this announcement Fabiano was granted an Australian work permit, and his transfer to Melbourne Victory was formally completed when the A-League transfer window reopened on 1 July 2008. Fabiano is quoted as saying that he wants to approach his new surroundings in a professional manner in order to help him adapt quicker to the higher standard of the A-League. Fabiano impressed in pre-season scoring 2 goals for his new suitors, a tap-in during a friendly match vs Whittlesea Zebras, and a bullet header the following week against Adelaide United in the 2008/09 A-League Pre-Season Cup.

Ney Fabiano scored his first regular season goal in Round 2 2008–09 against Wellington Phoenix. He received a red card in the round 4 match against Adelaide United after being accused of spitting at defender Robert Cornthwaite. The charge was sent straight to the tribunal and on the 17 September, the red card was upgraded to an eight match ban in addition to the mandatory one match suspension. Through an appeal this charge was reduced to a 6 match ban.

Ney Fabiano solidified his place as a fan favorite in Round 17 2008–09, when he scored the 80th-minute winner against rivals Sydney FC in a 3–2 win, celebrating the goal by jumping over the advertising boards and performing a samba dance in front of the home end.

On December 1, 2009 it was revealed that Fabiano was leaving Melbourne had signed a contract with Thai Premier League team Bangkok Glass FC for the 2010 season.

== Honours ==
With Melbourne Victory:

- A-League Championship: 2008–2009
- A-League Premiership: 2008–2009

With Chonburi FC:

- Kor Royal Cup: 2008

Personal Honours:

- Thai Premier League Top Scorer: 2007 with Thailand Tobacco Monopoly FC – 18 goals
