= Scott Jamieson =

Australian soccer player

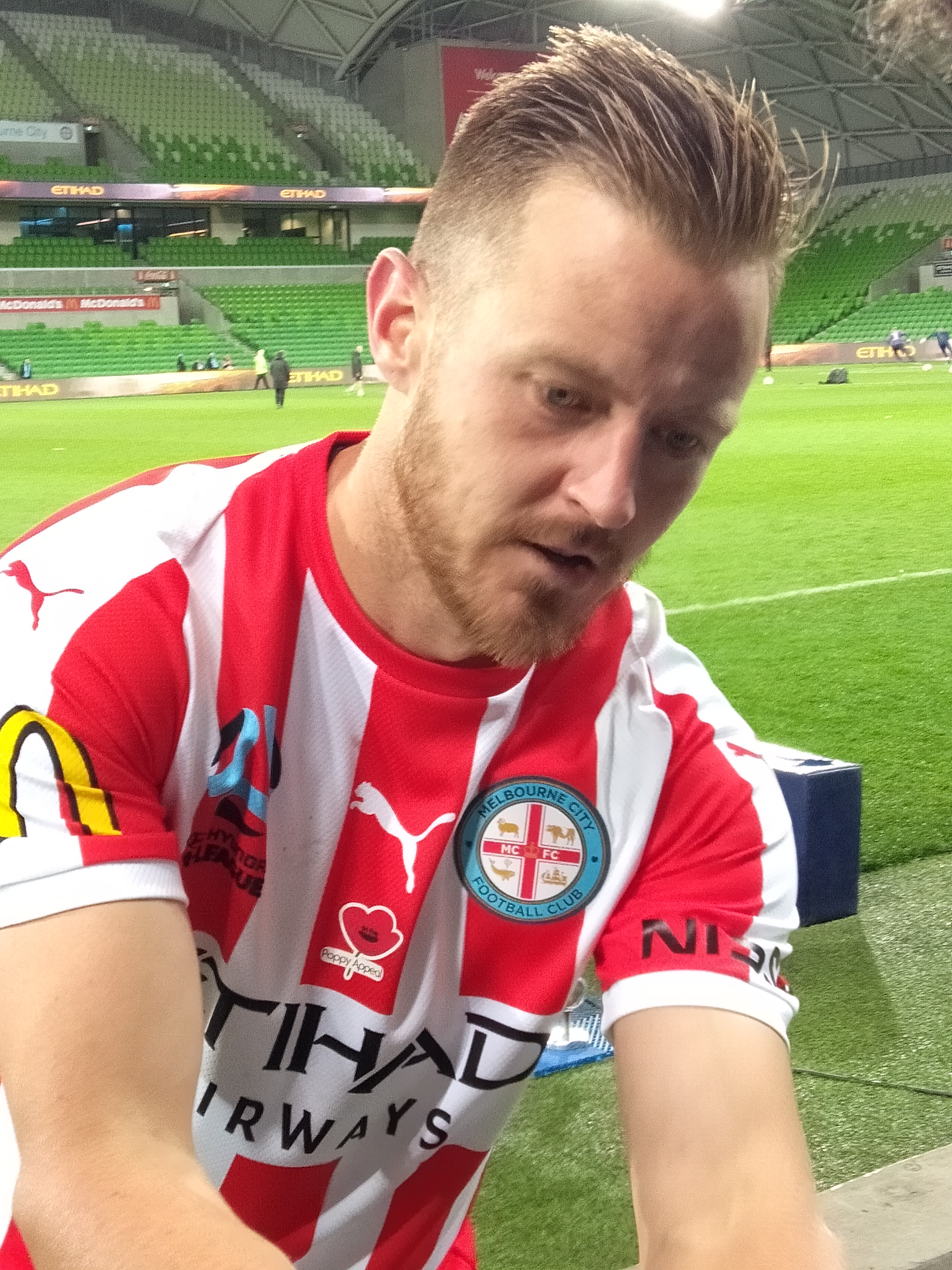
- Jamieson with Melbourne City in 2019

Personal information
- Full name: Scott Alexander Jamieson
- Date of birth: 13 October 1988 (age 38)
- Place of birth: Auburn, Sydney, Australia
- Height: 1.78 m (5 ft 10 in)
- Position: Left back

Youth career
- 1994–1998: Kings Langley
- 1998–2003: Blacktown City
- 2005–2006: Bolton Wanderers

Senior career*
Years	Team	Apps	(Gls)
2003–2005	Blacktown City	1	(0)
2006–2008	Bolton Wanderers	0	(0)
2008–2010	Adelaide United	49	(0)
2010–2012	Sydney FC	48	(1)
2012–2015	Perth Glory	55	(1)
2015–2016	Western Sydney Wanderers	29	(0)
2016–2017	IFK Göteborg	13	(0)
2017–2023	Melbourne City	140	(3)
Total		335	(5)

International career^{‡}
2005–2006	Australia U17	3	(0)
2010–2012	Australia	4	(0)

Managerial career
- 2023–: Melbourne City (Assistant)
- * Club domestic league appearances and goals as of 21 February 2023 ‡ National team caps and goals as of 7 December 2012

Scott Alexander Jamieson (born 13 October 1988) is an Australian retired soccer player who played as a left back.

== Club career ==
=== Blacktown City ===
Jamieson was born in Auburn, Sydney. He has previously played for the Blacktown City in the New South Wales Premier League and has also attended Westfields Sports High School before signing for English Premier League side Bolton Wanderers. In the summer of 2007 he made an appearance for Wanderers in their pre-season defeat against Hibernian.

=== Adelaide United ===
He ended a three-year stint in England with Bolton on 6 June by signing for Adelaide United on a two-year deal. He made his first A-League appearance for Adelaide in the season opener on 17 August 2008 where he played a full game at left back. Since his first game Jamieson has become a mainstay in the United backline contributing significantly in attack and from set plays. Jamieson was named man of the match for his performance in the 2008 FIFA Club World Cup game against Waitakere United on 11 December 2008. Jamieson capped off what was a terrific A-League debut season picking up the Rising Star Player of the Year award beating the likes of Michael Zullo, James Holland and Tarek Elrich.

Before the start of the 2009–10 A-League season, Jamieson was linked with moves to several Dutch Eredivisie clubs, but declined all offers and stated his preference in staying in Australia for another season.

After the end of the 2009–10 A-League season, he trialled with German second division club Greuther Fürth. Unfortunately the trial was unsuccessful and he returned to Australia undecided on his next move.

=== Sydney FC ===
On 21 May 2010 he was signed to a two-year contract by Sydney FC. Jamieson scored his first goal in the A-League against North Queensland Fury on 14 August 2010 with an unmarked header late in the game.

=== Perth Glory ===
He was released from Sydney FC after his 2-year contract was not renewed. He announced via his Twitter, that he was moving to Western Australia to play for Perth Glory.

=== Western Sydney Wanderers ===
After 3 seasons in Perth, Jamieson signed with Western Sydney Wanderers on 28 May 2015. In his first season with the club, Jamieson was named in the PFA Team of the Year.

=== IFK Göteborg ===
In August 2016, Jamieson joined Swedish club IFK Göteborg.

=== Melbourne City ===
==== 2017–2018: Return to Australia and City debut ====
The following year Scott returned to Australia for personal reasons and signed for Melbourne City on 26 September 2017 for a four-year contract. Jamieson had his decision to choose on joining Melbourne City for the better chance to win his first domestic trophy in his career. He made his debut for Melbourne City on 1 August 2017 in the FFA Cup against Peninsula Power in a 2–0 win.

==== 2018–2019: Assuming the captaincy ====
As Jamieson finished his first season with Melbourne City in 2017–18; On 13 October 2018 he was awarded to be the club's team captain to start the 2018–19 A-League season, replacing the captaincy for Michael Jakobsen.

==== 2019–2020: Third season and NSW ditch ====
After it was announced by Football Federation Australia that the remainder of the 2019–20 A-League season from 24 March 2020 would be played in a New South Wales hub, Jamieson had decided on 17 August to return to Melbourne for the birth of his first child to his partner Vicky. and give his captaincy to Josh Brillante for the rest of the A-League campaign.

==== 2020–2021: Record appearance-maker and double ====
On 22 May 2021, he earned a starting line-up role to give Melbourne City them and his first ever domestic league trophy by securing the A-League Premiership by winning 1–0 against the Central Coast Mariners. Jamieson officially became Melbourne City's all-time appearance maker with 104 appearances in Melbourne City's home semi-final on 20 June 2021 overtaking David Williams. A week later, he captained Melbourne City in their first A-League Championship by winning 3–1 against Sydney FC in the 2021 scored City's second goal to put City into the lead by a penalty.

== International career ==
He has represented Australia at U-17 level and was a member of Australia's squad for the 2005 FIFA U-17 World Championship.

After a string of impressive performances for Adelaide, Jamieson was called into Pim Verbeek's training squad for the match against Qatar in October 2008. Jamieson was once again selected in the Australian squad for an Asian cup qualifying match against Indonesia on 28 January 2009, where he played his first full international for the Australian national team.

== Career statistics ==
=== Club ===
As of 19 November 2021

Appearances and goals by club, season and competition
Club	Season	League			National Cup (Note: Includes the Pre-Season Challenge Cup, FFA Cup and Svenska Cupen)		Continental (Note: All appearances in the AFC Champions League, unless otherwise noted.)		Other		Total	
Club	Season	Division	Apps	Goals	Apps	Goals	Apps	Goals	Apps	Goals	Apps	Goals
Blacktown City	2003–04	NSW Premier League	1	0	—		—		—		1	0
Bolton Wanderers	2005–06	Premier League	0	0	—		—		—		0	0
Bolton Wanderers	2006–07	Premier League	0	0	—		—		—		0	0
Bolton Wanderers	2007–08	Premier League	0	0	—		—		—		0	0
Bolton Wanderers	Total		0	0	0	0	0	0	0	0	0	0
Adelaide United	2008–09	A-League	25	0	3	0	6	0	3 (Note: Three appearances in the FIFA Club World Cup)	0	37	0
Adelaide United	2009–10	A-League	24	0	—		6	0	—		30	0
Adelaide United	Total		49	0	3	0	12	0	3	0	67	0
Sydney FC	2010–11	A-League	26	1	—		6	0	—		32	1
Sydney FC	2011–12	A-League	22	0	—		0	0	—		22	0
Sydney FC	Total		48	1	0	0	6	0	0	0	53	1
Perth Glory	2012–13	A-League	23	0	—		—		—		23	0
Perth Glory	2013–14	A-League	7	0	—		—		—		7	0
Perth Glory	2014–15	A-League	26	1	4	0	—		—		30	1
Perth Glory	Total		55	1	4	0	0	0	0	0	56	1
Western Sydney Wanderers	2015–16	A-League	29	0	2	0	—		—		31	0
IFK Göteborg	2016	Allsvenskan	13	0	4	0	2 (Note: Two appearances in the UEFA Europa League)	0	—		19	0
IFK Göteborg	2017	Allsvenskan	2	0	—		—		—		2	0
IFK Göteborg	Total		15	0	4	0	2	0	0	0	21	0
Melbourne City	2017–18	A-League	28	0	3	0	—		—		31	0
Melbourne City	2018–19	A-League	23	0	3	0	—		—		26	0
Melbourne City	2019–20	A-League	22	0	5	0	—		—		27	0
Melbourne City	2020–21	A-League	21	3	—		—		—		21	3
Melbourne City	2021–22	A-League Men	1	0	1	0	0	0	—		2	0
Melbourne City	Total		95	3	12	0	0	0	0	0	107	3
Career total			292	5	25	0	20	0	3	0	340	5

=== International ===
As of match played 11 June 2021

National team	Year	Competitive		Friendly		Total	
National team	Year	Apps	Goals	Apps	Goals	Apps	Goals
Australia	2011	2	0	0	0	2	0
Australia	2012	0	0	2	0	2	0
Total		2	0	2	0	4	0

== Honours ==
Melbourne City

- A-League Premiership: 2020–21, 2021–22, 2022–23
- A-League Championship: 2020–21

Individual

- A-League Young Player of the Year: 2008–09
- Rising Star Award: 2008–09
- PFA A-League Team of the Season: 2014–15, 2015–16, 2020–21
