= Cristiano (footballer, born 1981) =

Brazilian footballer

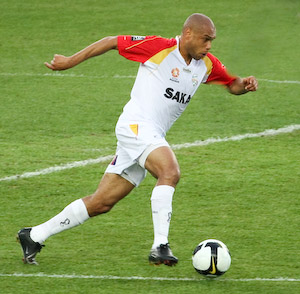
- Cristiano with Adelaide United in 2008

Personal information
- Full name: Cristiano dos Santos Rodrigues
- Date of birth: 3 June 1981 (age 45)
- Place of birth: Rio de Janeiro, Brazil
- Height: 1.75 m (5 ft 9 in)
- Position: Striker

Senior career*
Years	Team	Apps	(Gls)
1998–2002	NAC	70	(18)
2002–2006	Roda JC	99	(34)
2006–2007	Basel	7	(1)
2007	→ Willem II (loan)	12	(5)
2007–2008	Willem II	13	(1)
2008–2010	Adelaide United	49	(11)
2010–2011	Tarxien Rainbows	27	(8)
2011–2012	White City	7	(4)
2013	Olimpia	0	(0)
Total		284	(82)
- * Club domestic league appearances and goals

Cristiano dos Santos Rodrigues (born 3 June 1981), commonly known as Cristiano, is a retired Brazilian footballer.

== Biography ==
=== Early career ===
Cristiano began his club career with Dutch club NAC Breda. He signed his first professional contract with Breda at age 16. Cristiano was impressive, without being a prolific goal scorer and spent four years with Breda before moving to fellow Dutch side Roda JC.

Cristiano's performances with Breda impressed Roda manager Wiljan Vloet who was desperate to bring the Brazilian to the club. Cristiano averaged 0.34 goals a game in his four-year stint with Roda.

=== FC Basel ===
After eight seasons in the Netherlands, Cristiano sought a new challenge in a foreign country and jumped at the opportunity to join Swiss giants FC Basel for their 2006–07 season under head coach Christian Gross. He played his team debut on 26 August 2006 in the Swiss Cup third round match against local club FC Liestal. Cristiano scored three goals for his new club, during the first 27 minutes of the game, as Basel advanced with the end score 6–1 to the next round. After playing in a test game, in which he also scored twice, Cristiano played his domestic league debut for the club in the home game in the St. Jakob-Park on 10 September as Basel won 2–1 against Zürich. He played his next match four days later on 14 September in the 2006–07 UEFA Cup first round first leg game against Rabotnički. In this match he also scored two goals as Basel won 6–2.

Despite this very good start with his new club, Cristiano struggled to command a regular starting spot in the team. After the winter break, he went on loan back to the Netherlands and joined Willem II of Tilburg. His loan spell with Willem II was very successful, scoring 5 goals in 12 appearances. Willem II made Cristiano's move permanent at the end of the 2006–07 season. During his time with Basel Cristiano played a total of 20 games for the team scoring a total of 11 goals. Seven of these games were in the Swiss Super League, one in the Swiss Cup, six in the 2006–07 UEFA Cup and six were friendly games. He scored one goal in the domestic league, three in the domestic cup, two in the UEFA Cup and the other five were scored during the test games.

=== Willem II ===
Cristiano was unable to capture his form from his loan spell the previous season. Despite being well known in the Netherlands, he received tentative interest from other Dutch clubs due to his non-EU status requiring a high minimum salary, and began seeking options of regular football elsewhere.

=== Adelaide United ===
Cristiano moved to Australia to join A-League side Adelaide United at the start of the 2008–09 season. Adelaide had lost Nathan Burns and Bruce Djite in the off-season and were in desperate need for a permanent striker. After scoring on his debut in a pre-season match, Cristiano made his A-League debut in a 1–0 victory over Perth Glory. Cristiano was impressive in his debut, setting up the winning goal scored by Travis Dodd.

Cristiano scored his first competitive goal for Adelaide United in Round three against Wellington Phoenix at Hindmarsh Stadium. Cristiano finished with a brace in a 3–0 victory. After helping Adelaide United become the first Australian side to reach the semi-finals of the AFC Champions League, he scored a brace days later to help the Reds to a 2–0 victory over reigning premiers Newcastle Jets.

Cristiano scored his fifth goal in seven A-League matches by getting on the score sheet in a 3–3 draw against Central Coast. He scored the only goal of the 2008 FIFA Club World Cup fifth place play off against Egyptian club Al Ahly the impressive twenty yard strike was awarded 'goal of the tournament'.

In the 2008–09 Grand Final against Melbourne Victory, Cristiano was controversially red carded in the 10th minute. However, this red card was rescinded from his record.

He was released from Adelaide after their 2010 Asian Champions League campaign after they were knocked out of the round of 16.

=== Tarxien Rainbows ===
During the 2010–11 summer transfer window he signed a two-year contract until 2011–12, with Maltese Premier League club Tarxien Rainbows.

=== White City ===
It was announced on 7 June 2011 that Cristiano would move back to Adelaide and sign with South Australian Premier League side White City FC with an aim to further his career in coaching and to aim for re-signing with his former A-League club, Adelaide United.

Cristiano made his debut for White City FC in a 3–2 loss to Enfield City. He also scored from a header and was later sent off.

=== Olimpia ===
On 15 August 2013, Cristiano arrived in Honduran club Olimpia as a last-minute reinforcement on a free transfer. He failed to make his debut under then head coach Danilo Tosello and in early-2014 his contract was terminated.

== Personal life ==
Following his retirement from playing, Cristiano settled in Australia and is employed by Football South Australia. His son Raphael Borges Rodrigues is also a professional footballer.

== Career statistics ==
(Correct as of 1 January 2009)

Club	Season	League^{1}		Cup		International^{2}		Total	
Club	Season	Apps	Goals	Apps	Goals	Apps	Goals	Apps	Goals
NAC Breda	1998–99	4	1	1	0	0	0	5	1
NAC Breda	1999–00	13	3	2	1	0	0	15	4
NAC Breda	2000–01	24	5	0	0	0	0	24	5
NAC Breda	2001–02	29	9	3	1	0	0	32	10
NAC Breda	Total	70	18	6	2	0	0	76	20
Roda JC	2002–03	25	6	2	0	0	0	27	6
Roda JC	2003–04	28	9	2	2	0	0	30	11
Roda JC	2004–05	16	6	1	0	0	0	17	6
Roda JC	2005–06	30	13	3	1	0	0	33	14
Roda JC	Total	99	34	8	3	0	0	107	37
FC Basel	2006–07	7	1	1	1	3	0	8	2
FC Basel	Total	7	1	1	1	3	0	11	2
Willem II Tilburg	2006–07	12	5	0	0	0	0	12	5
Willem II Tilburg	2007–08	13	1	2	0	0	0	15	1
Willem II Tilburg	Total	25	6	2	0	0	0	27	6
Adelaide United	2008–09	25	8	3	2	9	2	37	12
Adelaide United	2009–10	24	3	-	-	0	0	24	3
Adelaide United	Total	49	11	3	2	9	2	61	15
Total		250	70	20	8	12	2	282	81

^{1} – includes A-League final series statistics
^{2} – includes FIFA Club World Cup statistics; AFC Champions League statistics are included in season commencing after group stages (i.e. 2008 ACL in 2008–09 A-League season etc.)
