= Lucas Pantelis =

Australian soccer player

Personal information
- Full name: Lucas Pantelis
- Date of birth: 12 March 1982 (age 44)
- Place of birth: Adelaide, Australia
- Height: 1.66 m (5 ft 5 1/2 in)
- Position: Left winger

Youth career
- West Adelaide SC
- 1998–1999: SASI
- 1999–2000: AIS

Senior career*
Years	Team	Apps	(Gls)
2000–2003	Adelaide City	77	(10)
2003–2004	Parramatta Power	23	(3)
2004	White City	11	(6)
2005–2011	Adelaide United	51	(9)
2011–2013	Wellington Phoenix	0	(0)

International career
1998–1999	Australia U-17	15	(5)
2000–2001	Australia U-20	11	(1)
2002	Australia U-23	4	(0)
Medal record
Men's football
Representing Australia
FIFA U-17 World Championship
Runner-up	1999 New Zealand
OFC U-19 Men's Championship
Winner	2001 Cook Islands/New Caledonia
- * Club domestic league appearances and goals as of 16:47, 18 February 2011 (UTC)

Lucas Pantelis (Greek: Λουκάς Παντελής, born 12 March 1982) is an Australian former association football player who last played for Wellington Phoenix in the A-League in 2013.

== Early life ==
Pantelis was born on 12 March 1982 in Adelaide, South Australia.

His father, Nick Pantelis, who migrated from the island of Kos, Greece, in 1964, played for West Adelaide SC in the NSL, and represented South Australia on 25 occasions between 1966 and 1971. He received an Award of Distinction from Football South Australia in 2003.

== Club career ==
Pantelis signed for Adelaide United for the inaugural A-League season where he played 18 games scoring once. He missed almost the entire 2006–07 season with a serious knee injury, though returned to competitive action for United during their 2007 Asian Champions League campaign where he played in four games. After an excellent 2007–08 season at Adelaide, many rumours arose about a possible transfer to Melbourne Victory however, he quashed these rumours when he signed a new deal with Adelaide United in January 2008 keeping him at the club until 2010.

On 19 November, it was revealed that Lucas reinjured his left knee, the same one that kept him out of the 2006–07 season. He made his comeback game on 9 January 2009 against Newcastle Jets at Hindmarsh Stadium in which Lucas scored the second goal in the 2–0 win and came off in the 81st minute. On 15 May 2011 it was confirmed that he had signed a two-year contract with A-League side Wellington Phoenix. Pantelis the suffered a third serious injury to his left knee – a full ACL rupture along with cartilage and meniscus tears during a pre-season match against Central Coast Mariners, and missed the entire 2011/12 season following surgery.

== Career statistics ==
(Correct as of 16 January 2009)

Club	Season	League^{1}		Cup		International^{2}		Total	
Club	Season	Apps	Goals	Apps	Goals	Apps	Goals	Apps	Goals
Adelaide United	2005–06	17	1	1	0	0	0	18	1
Adelaide United	2006–07	0	0	0	0	0	0	0	0
Adelaide United	2007–08	20	6	2	0	4	0	26	6
Adelaide United	2008–09	14	2	2	0	11	1	27	3
Total		51	9	5	0	15	1	71	10

^{1} – includes A-League final series statistics
^{2} – includes FIFA Club World Cup statistics; AFC Champions League statistics are included in season commencing after group stages (i.e. 2008 ACL in 2008–09 A-League season etc.)

== Honours ==
Adelaide United

- A-League Premiership: 2005–2006

Australia U-20

- OFC U-19 Men's Championship: 2001

Australia U-17

- FIFA U-17 World Championship: 1999 (Runners-Up)
