= 2008–09 A-League =

32nd season of top-tier soccer league in Australia

A-League
- Season: 2008–09
- Dates: 15 August 2008 – 28 February 2009
- Champions: Melbourne Victory (2nd title)
- Premiers: Melbourne Victory (2nd title)
- AFC Champions League: Melbourne Victory, Adelaide United
- Matches: 84
- Goals: 249 (2.96 per match)
- Top goalscorer: Shane Smeltz (12 goals)
- Best goalkeeper: Eugene Galekovic
- Highest attendance: 31,564
- Lowest attendance: 4,433
- Average attendance: 12,180 ( 2,430)

The 2008–09 A-League was the 32nd season of top-flight soccer in Australia, and the fourth season of the A-League competition since its establishment in 2004. Two new clubs, North Queensland Thunder and Gold Coast Galaxy had received tentative licences from the FFA but these were revoked for the 2008–09 season on 12 March 2008. Expansion plans are on hold until the 2009–10 season. Based on their 2007–08 performances, the Central Coast Mariners and the Newcastle Jets competed in the 2009 AFC Champions League for the first time.

Changes to the league included:

- The introduction of both a youth league and women's league aligned with A-League clubs.
- An increase in the salary cap to A$1.9 million.
- The addition of a Junior Marquee player. (A player under the age of 23 who has up to A$150,000 of his salary outside of the cap.
- Injury replacement players can only match the injured players' salary, or have any excess included within the total Salary Cap.

== Clubs ==

Team	Location	Stadium	Capacity
Adelaide United	Adelaide	Hindmarsh Stadium	17,000
Central Coast Mariners	Gosford	Bluetongue Stadium	20,119
Melbourne Victory	Melbourne	Telstra Dome	56,347
Newcastle Jets	Newcastle	Energy Australia Stadium	26,164
Perth Glory	Perth	Members Equity Stadium	18,156
Queensland Roar	Brisbane	Suncorp Stadium	52,500
Sydney FC	Sydney	Aussie Stadium	42,500
Wellington Phoenix	Wellington	Westpac Stadium	34,500

=== Foreign players ===
Club	Visa 1	Visa 2	Visa 3	Visa 4	Non-Visa foreigner(s)	Former player(s)
Adelaide United	(Brazil) Alemão	(Brazil) Cássio	(Brazil) Cristiano	(Brazil) Diego Walsh	(Ivory Coast) Jonas Salley^{1}	
Central Coast Mariners	(Germany) André Gumprecht				(Italy) Andrea Merenda^{3} (Malta) John Hutchinson^{2}	
Melbourne Victory	(Brazil) Ney Fabiano	(Costa Rica) Carlos Hernández	(Costa Rica) José Luis López		(Scotland) Grant Brebner^{1}	
Newcastle Jets	(Denmark) Jesper Håkansson	(South Korea) Song Jin-hyung				(Ecuador) Edmundo Zura
Perth Glory	(Argentina) Adrian Trinidad	(Brazil) Amaral	(England) James Robinson	(Ivory Coast) Eugène Dadi	(Netherlands) Victor Sikora^{3}	
Queensland Roar	(Brazil) Reinaldo	(Indonesia) Sergio van Dijk	(Scotland) Charlie Miller		(Brazil) Henrique^{3} (South Korea) Seo Hyuk-su^{1}	
Sydney FC	(Netherlands) Bobby Petta	(Northern Ireland) Terry McFlynn	(United States) Michael Enfield			
Wellington Phoenix	(Brazil) Daniel	(China) Gao Leilei	(England) Chris Greenacre		(Malta) Manny Muscat^{2}	(Brazil) Fred^{4}

The following do not fill a Visa position:
^{1}Those players who were born and started their professional career abroad but have since gained Australian Residency (and New Zealand Residency, in the case of Wellington Phoenix);
^{2}Australian residents (and New Zealand residents, in the case of Wellington Phoenix) who have chosen to represent another national team;
^{3}Injury Replacement Players, or National Team Replacement Players;
^{4}Guest Players (eligible to play a maximum of ten games)

=== Salary cap exemptions and captains ===
Club	Marquee	Junior Marquee	Captain	Vice-Captain
Adelaide United	(Australia) Paul Agostino	None	(Australia) Travis Dodd	(Australia) Lucas Pantelis
Central Coast Mariners	None	None	(Australia) Alex Wilkinson	None
Melbourne Victory	(Australia) Archie Thompson	(Australia) Nick Ward	(Australia) Kevin Muscat	None
Newcastle Jets	(Ecuador) Edmundo Zura (Note: Zura's contract was mutually terminated part-way through his marquee deal on 2 November 2008.)	(Australia) Adam D'Apuzzo	(Australia) Jade North (Australia) Matt Thompson (Note: Thompson replaced North as captain mid-season)	(Australia) Ante Covic (Australia) Adam Griffiths
Perth Glory	None	(Australia) Nikita Rukavytsya	(Australia) Jamie Coyne	None
Queensland Roar	(Australia) Craig Moore	None	(Australia) Craig Moore	None
Sydney FC	(Australia) John Aloisi	(Australia) Mark Bridge	(Australia) Steve Corica	None
Wellington Phoenix	None	None	(New Zealand) Andrew Durante	(New Zealand) Tim Brown (Australia) Jon McKain (Australia) Richard Johnson

== Pre-season Challenge Cup ==
All A-League clubs played the pre-season cup competition held in July and August, and were drawn into two groups. Group A consisted of Adelaide United, Melbourne Victory, Newcastle Jets and Perth Glory. Group B was Central Coast Mariners, Queensland Roar, Sydney FC and Wellington Phoenix.

The winner of each group, Melbourne Victory and Wellington Phoenix, met in Wellington on 6 August 2008 for the Pre-Season Cup Final. With the score at 0–0 after 90 minutes, the game went to penalties, Melbourne Victory eventually prevailing 8–7, thus becoming the first team in A-League history to claim all three available trophies, after winning the Premiership and Championship in the 2006–07 season.

== Regular season ==
The 2008–09 A-League season was played over 21 rounds, followed by a finals series.

=== League table ===
Pos	Team	Pld	W	D	L	GF	GA	GD	Pts	Qualification
1	Melbourne Victory (C)	21	12	2	7	39	27	+12	38	Qualification for 2010 AFC Champions League group stage and Finals series
2	Adelaide United	21	11	5	5	31	19	+12	38	Qualification for 2010 AFC Champions League group stage and Finals series
3	Queensland Roar	21	10	6	5	36	25	+11	36	Qualification for Finals series
4	Central Coast Mariners	21	7	7	7	35	32	+3	28	Qualification for Finals series
5	Sydney FC	21	7	5	9	33	32	+1	26	
6	Wellington Phoenix	21	7	5	9	23	31	−8	26	
7	Perth Glory	21	6	4	11	31	44	−13	22	
8	Newcastle Jets	21	4	6	11	21	39	−18	18	

Source: ultimatealeague.com
Rules for classification: 1) points; 2) goal difference; 3) number of goals scored.
(C) Champions

=== Results ===
==== Round 1 ====
15 August 2008	Newcastle Jets	1–1	Central Coast Mariners	EnergyAustralia Stadium, Newcastle
20:00 UTC+10	J. Griffiths 90+1' (pen.)	Report; Summary	Simon 87'	Attendance: 16,022; Referee: Matthew Breeze

16 August 2008	Sydney FC	0–0	Melbourne Victory	Sydney Football Stadium, Sydney
19:00 UTC+10		Report; Summary		Attendance: 16,227; Referee: Mark Shield

17 August 2008	Wellington Phoenix	1–1	Queensland Roar	Westpac Stadium, Wellington
17:00 UTC+12	Smeltz 51'	Report; Summary	Miller 46'	Attendance: 10,516; Referee: Ben Williams

17 August 2008	Adelaide United	1–0	Perth Glory	Hindmarsh Stadium, Adelaide
16:30 UTC+9:30	T. Dodd 41'	Report; Summary		Attendance: 10,510; Referee: Peter Green

==== Round 2 ====
22 August 2008	Perth Glory	3–3	Newcastle Jets	Members Equity Stadium, Perth
19:00 UTC+8	Trinidad 35' (pen.); Dadi 58'; Rukavytsya 81'	Report Summary	J. Griffiths 20' (pen.); Coyne 49' (o.g.); North 90+5'	Attendance: 8,876; Referee: Craig Zetter

23 August 2008	Central Coast Mariners	2–3	Sydney FC	Bluetongue Stadium, Gosford
19:00 UTC+10	Petrovski 13' (pen.), 67'	Report Summary	Corica 6', 14'; Cole 81'	Attendance: 10,932; Referee: Ben Williams

24 August 2008	Wellington Phoenix	2–4	Melbourne Victory	Westpac Stadium, Wellington
17:00 UTC+12	Smeltz 29', 65' (pen.)	Report Summary	Allsopp 16', 35'; Ney Fabiano 47'; K. Muscat 68' (pen.)	Attendance: 6,110; Referee: Strebre Delovski

24 August 2008	Queensland Roar	1–1	Adelaide United	Suncorp Stadium, Brisbane
17:00 UTC+10	Miller 47'	Report Summary	T. Dodd 8' (pen.)	Attendance: 12,761; Referee: Mark Shield

==== Round 3 ====
29 August 2008	Melbourne Victory	5–0	Newcastle Jets	Telstra Dome, Melbourne
18:00 UTC+10	Hernández 41'; A. Thompson 45+2'; Allsopp 61', 64'; Brebner 90'	Report; Summary		Attendance: 22,589; Referee: Mark Shield

30 August 2008	Adelaide United	3–0	Wellington Phoenix	Hindmarsh Stadium, Adelaide
18:30 UTC+9:30	Pantelis 15'; Cristiano 49', 60'	Report; Summary		Attendance: 7,832; Referee: Matthew Breeze

31 August 2008	Sydney FC	5–2	Perth Glory	Sydney Football Stadium, Sydney
15:00 UTC+10	Brosque 3'; Corica 21' (pen.); Bridge 39'; Cole 43'; Topor-Stanley 88' (o.g.)	Report; Summary	Dadi 12', 67' (pen.)	Attendance: 11,732; Referee: Peter Green

31 August 2008	Queensland Roar	2–4	Central Coast Mariners	Suncorp Stadium, Brisbane
17:00 UTC+10	Miller 69' van Dijk 73' (pen.)	Report; Summary	Simon 31'; Jedinak 48'; Macallister 64', 71'	Attendance: 12,185; Referee: Peter O'Leary

==== Round 4 ====
12 September 2008	Melbourne Victory	1–0	Adelaide United	Telstra Dome, Melbourne
18:00 UTC+10	K. Muscat 64'	Report; Summary		Attendance: 24,812; Referee: Matthew Breeze

13 September 2008	Newcastle Jets	0–0	Sydney FC	EnergyAustralia Stadium, Newcastle
19:00 UTC+10		Report; Summary		Attendance: 11,535; Referee: Peter O'Leary

14 September 2008	Perth Glory	0–3	Queensland Roar	Members Equity Stadium, Perth
15:00 UTC+8		Report; Summary	Moore 14'; McKay 23'; Miller 45+2'	Attendance: 8,203; Referee: Ben Williams

14 September 2008	Wellington Phoenix	0–0	Central Coast Mariners	Westpac Stadium, Wellington
17:00 UTC+12		Report; Summary		Attendance: 6,928; Referee: Strebre Delovski

==== Round 5 ====
19 September 2008	Queensland Roar	0–1	Newcastle Jets	Suncorp Stadium, Brisbane
20:00 UTC+10		Report; Summary	J. Griffiths 83'	Attendance: 12,103; Referee: Craig Zetter

20 September 2008	Sydney FC	3–0	Adelaide United	Sydney Football Stadium, Sydney
17:00 UTC+10	McFlynn 2'; Brosque 34'; Santalab 79'	Report; Summary		Attendance: 12,462; Referee: Ben Williams

20 September 2008	Central Coast Mariners	2–2	Melbourne Victory	Bluetongue Stadium, Gosford
19:00 UTC+10	Simon 12', 84'	Report; Summary	A. Thompson 16', 90+4'	Attendance: 9,010; Referee: Peter Green

21 September 2008	Perth Glory	1–0	Wellington Phoenix	Members Equity Stadium, Perth
15:00 UTC+8	Dadi 79' (pen.)	Report; Summary		Attendance: 4,433; Referee: Strebre Delovski

==== Round 6 ====
26 September 2008	Central Coast Mariners	4–1	Perth Glory	Bluetongue Stadium, Gosford
20:00 UTC+10	Petrovski 9'; Jedinak 29'; Caceres 45'; Osman 64'	Report; Summary	Rukavytsya 63'	Attendance: 8,016; Referee: Mark Shield

27 September 2008	Adelaide United	2–0	Newcastle Jets	Hindmarsh Stadium, Adelaide
18:30 UTC+9:30	Cristiano 72', 89'	Report; Summary		Attendance: 8,111; Referee: Strebre Delovski

28 September 2008	Wellington Phoenix	2–1	Sydney FC	Westpac Stadium, Wellington
17:00 UTC+12	Smeltz 42'; Brown 76'	Report; Summary	Brosque 20'	Attendance: 6,729; Referee: Chris Beath

28 September 2008	Melbourne Victory	0–2	Queensland Roar	Telstra Dome, Melbourne
17:00 UTC+10		Report; Summary	Minniecon 83'; Zullo 90+4'	Attendance: 22,266; Referee: Ben Williams

==== Round 7 ====
3 October 2008	Adelaide United	3–3	Central Coast Mariners	Hindmarsh Stadium, Adelaide
19:30 UTC+9:30	T. Dodd 7' (pen.); Cornthwaite 19'; Cristiano 50'	Report; Summary	Jedinak 66' (pen.), 76'; Simon 84'	Attendance: 9,074; Referee: Ben Williams

4 October 2008	Melbourne Victory	4–0	Perth Glory	Telstra Dome, Melbourne
17:00 UTC+10	Brebner 25'; Allsopp 39', 71'; Vargas 46'	Report; Summary		Attendance: 18,036; Referee: Strebre Delovski

4 October 2008	Sydney FC	1–1	Queensland Roar	Sydney Football Stadium, Sydney
19:00 UTC+10	Musialik 90+3'	Report; Summary	Miller 49'	Attendance: 12,403; Referee: Matthew Breeze

6 October 2008	Newcastle Jets	2–2	Wellington Phoenix	EnergyAustralia Stadium, Newcastle
15:00 UTC+11	T. Elrich 59'; Patafta 68'	Report; Summary	Smeltz 52' (pen.), 89' (pen.)	Attendance: 8,492; Referee: Craig Zetter

==== Round 8 ====
17 October 2008	Queensland Roar	0–1	Adelaide United	Suncorp Stadium, Brisbane
19:30 UTC+10		Report; Summary	Cornthwaite 60'	Attendance: 11,117; Referee: Mark Shield

18 October 2008	Newcastle Jets	1–0	Melbourne Victory	EnergyAustralia Stadium, Newcastle
19:00 UTC+11	Jesic 85'	Report; Summary		Attendance: 11,384; Referee: Matthew Breeze

19 October 2008	Central Coast Mariners	0–1	Wellington Phoenix	Bluetongue Stadium, Gosford
15:00 UTC+11		Report; Summary	K. Dodd 53'	Attendance: 9,011; Referee: Ben Williams

19 October 2008	Perth Glory	2–1	Sydney FC	Members Equity Stadium, Perth
14:00 UTC+8	Harnwell 5', 47'	Report; Summary	Santalab 11'	Attendance: 7,759; Referee: Peter O'Leary

==== Round 9 ====
24 October 2008	Central Coast Mariners	1–0	Newcastle Jets	Bluetongue Stadium, Gosford
20:00 UTC+11	Macallister 33'	Report; Summary		Attendance: 10,710; Referee: Matthew Breeze

25 October 2008	Melbourne Victory	0–2	Sydney FC	Telstra Dome, Melbourne
19:00 UTC+11		Report; Summary	Bridge 20'; Aloisi 62'	Attendance: 31,564; Referee: Ben Williams

26 October 2008	Adelaide United	2–1	Perth Glory	Hindmarsh Stadium, Adelaide
16:30 UTC+10:30	Alemão 80'; T. Dodd 82' (pen.)	Report; Summary	Rukavytsya 55'	Attendance: 10,126; Referee: Strebre Delovski

26 October 2008	Wellington Phoenix	0–1	Queensland Roar	Westpac Stadium, Wellington
17:00 UTC+13		Report; Summary	McCloughan 40'	Attendance: 6,543; Referee: Peter O'Leary

==== Round 10 ====
31 October 2008	Adelaide United	2–3	Melbourne Victory	Hindmarsh Stadium, Adelaide
19:30 UTC+10:30	T. Dodd 28' (pen.); Cássio 67'	Report; Summary	K. Muscat 55' (pen.), 81' (pen.); Celeski 84'	Attendance: 13,191; Referee: Matthew Breeze

1 November 2008	Sydney FC	3–3	Central Coast Mariners	Sydney Football Stadium, Sydney
19:00 UTC+11	Bridge 28'; Casey 39'; McFlynn 57'	Report; Summary	Simon 63', 81'; Mrdja 78'	Attendance: 18,251; Referee: Strebre Delovski

2 November 2008	Newcastle Jets	1–2	Queensland Roar	EnergyAustralia Stadium, Newcastle
17:00 UTC+11	J. Griffiths 23'	Report; Summary	McKay 24'; Miller 35'	Attendance: 10,507; Referee: Craig Zetter

2 November 2008	Perth Glory	2–0	Wellington Phoenix	Members Equity Stadium, Perth
17:00 UTC+9	Rukavytsya 15', 70'	Report; Summary		Attendance: 7,228; Referee: Chris Beath

==== Round 11 ====
7 November 2008	Sydney FC	1–2	Wellington Phoenix	Sydney Football Stadium, Sydney
20:00 UTC+11	Musialik 77'	Report; Summary	Bertos 34'; Smeltz 89' (pen.)	Attendance: 12,856; Referee: Craig Zetter

8 November 2008	Queensland Roar	0–1	Melbourne Victory	Suncorp Stadium, Brisbane
19:00 UTC+10		Report; Summary	A. Thompson 71'	Attendance: 12,022; Referee: Peter O'Leary

9 November 2008	Perth Glory	2–2	Newcastle Jets	Members Equity Stadium, Perth
17:00 UTC+9	Rukavytsya 27'; Dadi 90+2' (pen.)	Report; Summary	J. Griffiths 17'; T. Elrich 45'	Attendance: 7,837; Referee: Matthew Breeze

15 November 2008	Central Coast Mariners	3–0	Adelaide United	Bluetongue Stadium, Gosford
19:30 UTC+11	Simon 18'; Petrovski 44'; Caceres 50'	Report; Summary		Attendance: 7,865; Referee: Matthew Breeze

==== Round 12 ====
21 November 2008	Melbourne Victory	2–1	Central Coast Mariners	Telstra Dome, Melbourne
20:00 UTC+11	Pondeljak 37'; A. Thompson 60'	Report; Summary	Hutchinson 34'	Attendance: 21,455; Referee: Strebre Delovski

22 November 2008	Adelaide United	2–0	Sydney FC	Hindmarsh Stadium, Adelaide
18:30 UTC+10:30	Ognenovski 45+2'; T. Dodd 78'	Report; Summary		Attendance: 9,509; Referee: Ben Williams

23 November 2008	Wellington Phoenix	2–0	Newcastle Jets	Westpac Stadium, Wellington
18:00 UTC+13	Smeltz 79'; Hearfield 86'	Report; Summary		Attendance: 5,500; Referee: Matthew Breeze

23 November 2008	Queensland Roar	4–1	Perth Glory	Suncorp Stadium, Brisbane
17:00 UTC+10	van Dijk 45+1' (pen.); Minniecon 45+3'; Miller 55'; Nichols 82'	Report; Summary	Harnwell 57'	Attendance: 9,118; Referee: Peter Green

==== Round 13 ====
28 November 2008	Wellington Phoenix	2–1	Melbourne Victory	Westpac Stadium, Wellington
19:30 UTC+13	Brown 21'; Smeltz 58'	Report; Summary	Allsopp 20'	Attendance: 7,953; Referee: Craig Zetter

28 November 2008	Sydney FC	1–1	Queensland Roar	Sydney Football Stadium, Sydney
20:00 UTC+10	Corica 64'	Report; Summary	McKay 12'	Attendance: 8,502; Referee: Matthew Breeze

29 November 2008	Perth Glory	2–2	Central Coast Mariners	Members Equity Stadium, Perth
18:00 UTC+9	Rukavytsya 55', 62'	Report; Summary	Jedinak 31'; Petrovski 90+2'	Attendance: 6,496; Referee: Peter O'Leary

30 November 2008	Newcastle Jets	1–1	Adelaide United	EnergyAustralia Stadium, Newcastle
17:00 UTC+11	M. Thompson 56'	Report; Summary	Ognenovski 90+4'	Attendance: 7,136; Referee: Chris Beath

==== Round 14 ====
5 December 2008	Adelaide United	6–1	Wellington Phoenix	Hindmarsh Stadium, Adelaide
19:30 UTC+10:30	Ognenovski 21'; Cristiano 43', 74'; Cassio 57', 70'; T. Dodd 90+1'	Report; Summary	Fred 56'	Attendance: 9,442; Referee: Matthew Breeze

6 December 2008	Central Coast Mariners	1–1	Queensland Roar	Bluetongue Stadium, Gosford
18:00 UTC+11	Gumprecht 83'	Report; Summary	van Dijk 11'	Attendance: 8,995; Referee: Ben Williams

6 December 2008	Perth Glory	3–1	Melbourne Victory	Members Equity Stadium, Perth
18:00 UTC+9	Dadi 19', 23'; Pellegrino 79'	Report; Summary	Ney Fabiano 55'	Attendance: 6,621; Referee: Peter Green

7 December 2008	Newcastle Jets	1–2	Sydney FC	EnergyAustralia Stadium, Newcastle
17:00 UTC+11	Wheelhouse 11'	Report; Summary	Fyfe 15'; Gan 78'	Attendance: 7,872; Referee: Strebre Delovski

==== Round 15 ====
13 December 2008	Wellington Phoenix	1–1	Perth Glory	Westpac Stadium, Wellington
19:00 UTC+13	Brown 83'	Report; Summary	Dadi 76'	Attendance: 6,362; Referee: Strebre Delovski

13 December 2008	Central Coast Mariners	2–1	Sydney FC	Bluetongue Stadium, Gosford
19:00 UTC+11	Macallister 11'; Jedinak 90+1' (pen.)	Report; Summary	Aloisi 65' (pen.)	Attendance: 11,220; Referee: Peter Green

14 December 2008	Queensland Roar	2–1	Newcastle Jets	Suncorp Stadium, Brisbane
18:00 UTC+10	Nichols 45+2' van Dijk 90+1'	Report; Summary	J. Griffiths 26'	Attendance: 11,048; Referee: Ben Williams

6 January 2009	Melbourne Victory	1–0	Adelaide United	Telstra Dome, Melbourne
19:30 UTC+11	Ward 58'	Report; Summary		Attendance: 27,196; Referee: Matthew Breeze

==== Round 16 ====
19 December 2008	Wellington Phoenix	1–0	Central Coast Mariners	Westpac Stadium, Wellington
19:30 UTC+13	Smeltz 2'	Report; Summary		Attendance: 6,722; Referee: Chris Beath

19 December 2008	Newcastle Jets	4–2	Melbourne Victory	EnergyAustralia Stadium, Newcastle
20:00 UTC+11	M. Thompson 16', 45', 49'; Song 60'	Report; Summary	Allsopp 66'; Ney Fabiano 87'	Attendance: 6,268; Referee: Craig Zetter

21 December 2008	Sydney FC	1–4	Perth Glory	Sydney Football Stadium, Sydney
17:00 UTC+11	Musialik 61'	Report; Summary	Pellegrino 11'; Golec 36' (o.g.); Srhoj 49'; Middleby 69' (o.g.)	Attendance: 12,165; Referee: Ben Williams

14 January 2009	Adelaide United	0–0	Queensland Roar	Hindmarsh Stadium, Adelaide
19:30 UTC+10:30		Report; Summary		Attendance: 14,450; Referee: Strebre Delovski

==== Round 17 ====
26 December 2008	Newcastle Jets	1–2	Central Coast Mariners	EnergyAustralia Stadium, Newcastle
20:00 UTC+11	J. Griffiths 9' (pen.)	Report; Summary	Petrovski 67'; Simon 80'	Attendance: 11,413; Referee: Peter O'Leary

26 December 2008	Perth Glory	0–1	Adelaide United	Members Equity Stadium, Perth
20:00 UTC+9		Report; Summary	Sarkies 40'	Attendance: 12,581; Referee: Craig Zetter

27 December 2008	Melbourne Victory	3–2	Sydney FC	Telstra Dome, Melbourne
19:00 UTC+11	A. Thompson 14'; Ward 71'; Ney Fabiano 80'	Report; Summary	Cole 1'; Gan 4'	Attendance: 25,398; Referee: Matthew Breeze

28 December 2008	Queensland Roar	3–2	Wellington Phoenix	Suncorp Stadium, Brisbane
18:00 UTC+10	McKay 39' van Dijk 48'; Oar 90+1'	Report; Summary	de Vere 11' (o.g.); Hearfield 46'	Attendance: 13,115; Referee: Ben Williams

==== Round 18 ====
31 December 2008	Central Coast Mariners	1–0	Perth Glory	Bluetongue Stadium, Gosford
18:00 UTC+11	Hutchinson 80'	Report; Summary		Attendance: 15,546; Referee: Strebre Delovski

2 January 2009	Melbourne Victory	2–1	Queensland Roar	Telstra Dome, Melbourne
20:00 UTC+11	Allsopp 55'; Vargas 67'	Report; Summary	Moore 75'	Attendance: 23,447; Referee: Peter O'Leary

3 January 2009	Adelaide United	2–0	Sydney FC	Adelaide Oval, Adelaide
19:30 UTC+10:30	Cássio 45+1'; Alemão 83'	Report; Summary		Attendance: 23,002; Referee: Chris Beath

4 January 2009	Wellington Phoenix	3–0	Newcastle Jets	Westpac Stadium, Wellington
19:00 UTC+13	Bertos 62'; Smeltz 67', 86' (pen.)	Report; Summary		Attendance: 7,520; Referee: Craig Zetter

==== Round 19 ====
9 January 2009	Adelaide United	2–0	Newcastle Jets	Hindmarsh Stadium, Adelaide
19:30 UTC+10:30	Barbiero 23'; Pantelis 74'	Report; Summary		Attendance: 13,585; Referee: Peter Green

10 January 2009	Central Coast Mariners	3–4	Queensland Roar	Bluetongue Stadium, Gosford
19:00 UTC+11	Mrdja 5'; Simon 55', 81'	Report; Summary	van Dijk 43', 48'; Minniecon 60'; Porter 69' (o.g.)	Attendance: 11,454; Referee: Matthew Breeze

11 January 2009	Sydney FC	1–0	Wellington Phoenix	Sydney Football Stadium, Sydney
18:00 UTC+11	Danning 85'	Report; Summary		Attendance: 9,605; Referee: Ben Williams

11 January 2009	Perth Glory	3–2	Melbourne Victory	Members Equity Stadium, Perth
18:00 UTC+9	Dadi 32', 76'; Rukavytsya 36'	Report; Summary	Allsopp 3'; Ney Fabiano 48'	Attendance: 9,381; Referee: Chris Beath

==== Round 20 ====
16 January 2009	Melbourne Victory	3–0	Central Coast Mariners	Telstra Dome, Melbourne
20:00 UTC+11	Allsopp 68'; Hernández 71'; A. Thompson 75'	Report; Summary		Attendance: 24,003; Referee: Peter Green

17 January 2009	Queensland Roar	3–1	Sydney FC	Suncorp Stadium, Brisbane
19:00 UTC+10	van Dijk 16', 28', 90+3'	Report; Summary	Danning 25'	Attendance: 19,111; Referee: Craig Zetter

18 January 2009	Wellington Phoenix	1–1	Adelaide United	Westpac Stadium, Wellington
17:00 UTC+13	Barbarouses 31'	Report; Summary	Reid 9'	Attendance: 8,241; Referee: Chris Beath

18 January 2009	Newcastle Jets	2–1	Perth Glory	EnergyAustralia Stadium, Newcastle
17:00 UTC+11	Kovacic 41'; Milligan 55' (pen.)	Report; Summary	Bulloch 65'	Attendance: 6,665; Referee: Kris Griffith-Jones

==== Round 21 ====
23 January 2009	Melbourne Victory	2–0	Wellington Phoenix	Telstra Dome, Melbourne
20:00 UTC+11	K. Muscat 40' (pen.); A. Thompson 90'	Report; Summary		Attendance: 28,905; Referee: Strebre Delovski

24 January 2009	Queensland Roar	4–2	Perth Glory	Suncorp Stadium, Brisbane
20:00 UTC+10	Nichols 27'; Tiatto 63' van Dijk 76'; McCloughan 82'	Report; Summary	Rukavytsya 21'; Skorich 66'	Attendance: 17,367; Referee: Peter O'Leary

25 January 2009	Sydney FC	4–0	Newcastle Jets	Sydney Football Stadium, Sydney
17:00 UTC+11	Brosque 13', 41'; Milligan 77' (o.g.); Bridge 86'	Report; Summary		Attendance: 9,551; Referee: Kevin Docherty

25 January 2009	Central Coast Mariners	0–1	Adelaide United	Bluetongue Stadium, Gosford
19:00 UTC+11		Report; Summary	Cristiano 82'	Attendance: 12,351; Referee: Matthew Breeze

== Finals series ==
=== Bracket ===
Semifinals
2	Adelaide United	0	0	0
1	Melbourne Victory	2	4	6
4	Central Coast Mariners	0	1	1
3	Queensland Roar	2	2	4

Preliminary final
2	Adelaide United	1
3	Queensland Roar	0

Final
1	Melbourne Victory	1
2	Adelaide United	0

=== Semi-finals ===
6 February 2009
20:00 UTC+11

Central Coast Mariners	0–2	Queensland Roar
	Report; Summary	Nichols 30'; van Dijk 54' (pen.)

Bluetongue Stadium, Gosford
Attendance: 9,514
Referee: Ben Williams
13 February 2009
19:30 UTC+10

Queensland Roar	2–1	Central Coast Mariners
Nichols 21'; McKay 49'	Report; Summary	Mrdja 64'

Suncorp Stadium, Brisbane
Attendance: 23,705
Referee: Peter Green

Queensland Roar won 4–1 on aggregate.

7 February 2009
18:30 UTC+10:30

Adelaide United	0–2	Melbourne Victory
	Report; Summary	Hernández 13'; Allsopp 89'

Hindmarsh Stadium, Adelaide
Attendance: 14,119
Referee: Strebre Delovski
14 February 2009
19:30 UTC+11

Melbourne Victory	4–0	Adelaide United
Thompson 10'; Hernández 24'; Allsopp 44'; Pondeljak 48'	Report; Summary

Telstra Dome, Melbourne
Attendance: 34,736
Referee: Matthew Breeze

Melbourne Victory won 6–0 on aggregate.

=== Preliminary final ===
21 February 2009
18:30 UTC+10:30

Adelaide United	1–0	Queensland Roar
Barbiero 25'	Report; Summary

Hindmarsh Stadium, Adelaide
Attendance: 8,472
Referee: Strebre Delovski

=== Grand Final ===
28 February 2009
19:30 UTC+11

Melbourne Victory	1–0	Adelaide United
Pondeljak 60'	Report; Summary

Telstra Dome, Melbourne
Attendance: 53,273
Referee: Matthew Breeze

== Statistics ==
=== Leading scorers ===
Total	Player		Team	Goals per Round																				
Total	Player		Team	1	2	3	4	5	6	7	8	9	10	11	12	13	14	15	16	17	18	19	20	21
12	(New Zealand)	Shane Smeltz	Wellington Phoenix	1	2				1	2				1	1	1			1		2			
11	(Australia)	Matt Simon	Central Coast Mariners	1		1		2		1			2	1						1		2		
11	(Australia)	Daniel Allsopp	Melbourne Victory		2	2				2						1			1		1	1	1	
11	(Indonesia)	Sergio van Dijk	Queensland Roar			1									1		1	1		1		2	3	1
10	(Ivory Coast)	Eugène Dadi	Perth Glory		1	2		1						1			2	1				2		
10	(Australia)	Nikita Rukavytsya	Perth Glory		1				1			1	2	1		2						1		1
8	(Australia)	Archie Thompson	Melbourne Victory			1		2						1	1					1			1	1
8	(Brazil)	Cristiano	Adelaide United			2			2	1							2							1
8	(Scotland)	Charlie Miller	Queensland Roar	1	1	1	1			1			1		1									
7	(Australia)	Travis Dodd	Adelaide United	1	1					1		1	1		1		1							
7	(Australia)	Joel Griffiths	Newcastle Jets	1	1			1					1	1				1		1				
6	(Australia)	Mile Jedinak	Central Coast Mariners			1			1	2						1		1						
6	(Australia)	Sasho Petrovski	Central Coast Mariners		2				1					1		1				1				
5	(Brazil)	Ney Fabiano de Oliveira	Melbourne Victory		1												1		1	1		1		
5	(Australia)	Kevin Muscat	Melbourne Victory		1		1						2											1
5	(Australia)	Alex Brosque	Sydney FC			1		1	1															2
As of the end of the home and away season

A goal was scored from a penalty kick
Two goals were scored from penalty kicks

=== Attendance ===
These are the attendance records of each of the teams at the end of the home and away season. The table does not include finals series attendances.

Team	Hosted	Average	High	Low	Total
Melbourne Victory	11	24,516	31,564	18,036	269,671
Queensland Roar	10	12,995	19,111	9,118	129,947
Sydney FC	10	12,375	18,251	8,502	123,754
Adelaide United	11	11,712	23,002	7,832	128,832
Central Coast Mariners	11	10,465	15,546	7,865	115,110
Newcastle Jets	10	9,729	16,022	6,268	97,294
Perth Glory	10	7,942	12,581	4,433	79,415
Wellington Phoenix	11	7,193	10,516	5,500	79,124
League total	84	12,180	31,564	4,433	1,023,147

* Adelaide United played a one-off match at the Adelaide Oval against Sydney FC in their Round 18 match. This is why Adelaide United's highest single attendance exceeds the capacity of Hindmarsh Stadium.

==== Top 10 Attendances ====
Attendance	Round	Date	Home	Score	Away	Venue	Weekday	Time of Day
53,273	Grand Final	28 February 2009	Melbourne Victory	1–0	Adelaide United	Telstra Dome	Saturday	Night
34,736	Major SF (L2)	14 February 2009	Melbourne Victory	4–0	Adelaide United	Telstra Dome	Saturday	Night
31,654	Round 9	25 October 2008	Melbourne Victory	0–2	Sydney FC	Telstra Dome	Saturday	Night
28,905	Round 21	23 January 2009	Melbourne Victory	2–0	Wellington Phoenix	Telstra Dome	Friday	Night
27,196	Round 15	6 January 2009	Melbourne Victory	1–0	Adelaide United	Telstra Dome	Tuesday	Night
25,398	Round 17	27 December 2008	Melbourne Victory	3–2	Sydney FC	Telstra Dome	Saturday	Night
24,812	Round 4	12 September 2008	Melbourne Victory	1–0	Adelaide United	Telstra Dome	Friday	Night
24,003	Round 20	16 January 2009	Melbourne Victory	3–0	Central Coast Mariners	Telstra Dome	Friday	Night
23,705	Minor SF (L2)	13 February 2009	Queensland Roar	2–1	Central Coast Mariners	Suncorp Stadium	Friday	Night
23,447	Round 18	2 January 2009	Melbourne Victory	2–1	Queensland Roar	Telstra Dome	Friday	Night

== Awards ==
- The Premiers' Plate was awarded to the Melbourne Victory, who finished on top of the ladder after the regular season.
- The Johnny Warren Medal was awarded to Shane Smeltz from the Wellington Phoenix.
- The Coach of the Year was awarded to Aurelio Vidmar of Adelaide United.
- The Reebok Golden Boot was awarded to Shane Smeltz of the Wellington Phoenix (12 goals - regular season).
- The Rising Star award was awarded to Scott Jamieson of Adelaide United.
- The Fair Play Award was awarded to the Queensland Roar.
- Goalkeeper of the Year was awarded to Eugene Galekovic of Adelaide United.
- Referee of the Year was awarded to Matthew Breeze.
- Foreign Player of the Year was awarded to Charlie Miller of the Queensland Roar.

== See also ==
- Adelaide United season 2008-09
- Central Coast Mariners season 2008-09
- Melbourne Victory season 2008-09
- Newcastle United Jets FC season 2008-09
- Perth Glory season 2008-09
- Queensland Roar season 2008-09
- Sydney FC season 2008-09
- Wellington Phoenix season 2008-09
- 2008 Australian football code crowds
