= İsyan Erdogan =

Australian soccer player

Personal information
- Full name: İsyan Erdogan
- Date of birth: 25 September 1982 (age 44)
- Place of birth: Melbourne, Australia
- Height: 1.75 m (5 ft 9 in)
- Positions: Centre back; right back; midfielder

Youth career
- 1998–1999: Carlton

Senior career*
| Years | Team | Apps | (Gls) |
| 1998–2000 | Carlton | 1 | (0) |
| 2001–2002 | Whittlesea Stallions | 43 | (2) |
| 2002–2004 | Melbourne Knights | 30 | (1) |
| 2004 | Whittlesea Stallions | 8 | (1) |
| 2005 | Heidelberg United | 30 | (0) |
| 2006 | Sunshine George Cross | 20 | (0) |
| 2007 | Preston Lions | 16 | (0) |
| 2007–2009 | Adelaide United | 13 | (0) |
| 2009–2015 | Hume City | 136 | (5) |
| 2016–2019 | Geelong SC | 71 | (0) |
- * Club domestic league appearances and goals as of 2 October 2019

İsyan Erdogan (born 25 September 1982 in Melbourne, Victoria, Australia) is an Australian soccer player who last played for Geelong SC in the Victorian State League Division 1.

== Club career ==
Erdogan has been plying his trade with various Victorian Premier League clubs after playing for former NSL clubs Carlton SC and the Melbourne Knights before signing with Australian A-League club Adelaide United for the 2007–08 season in which he went on to make 13 appearances.

After making just 13 senior appearances in two seasons with the Reds', the injury plagued Erdogan was released following the conclusion of the 2008/09 season. On 23 February 2009 he was signed up by Hume City FC to play in the 2009 Victorian Premier League.

Erdogan was to spend the next six seasons with the Broadmeadows-based club, going on to become the club captain and fan favourite. Upon the conclusion of the 2015 NPL Victoria season, in which Hume City had a strong FFA Cup run, going down in the semi-finals to A-League side Melbourne Victory, Erdogan dropped three divisions down the Victorian football league ladder to sign with Geelong SC.
