= Alemão (footballer, born November 1982) =

Brazilian footballer

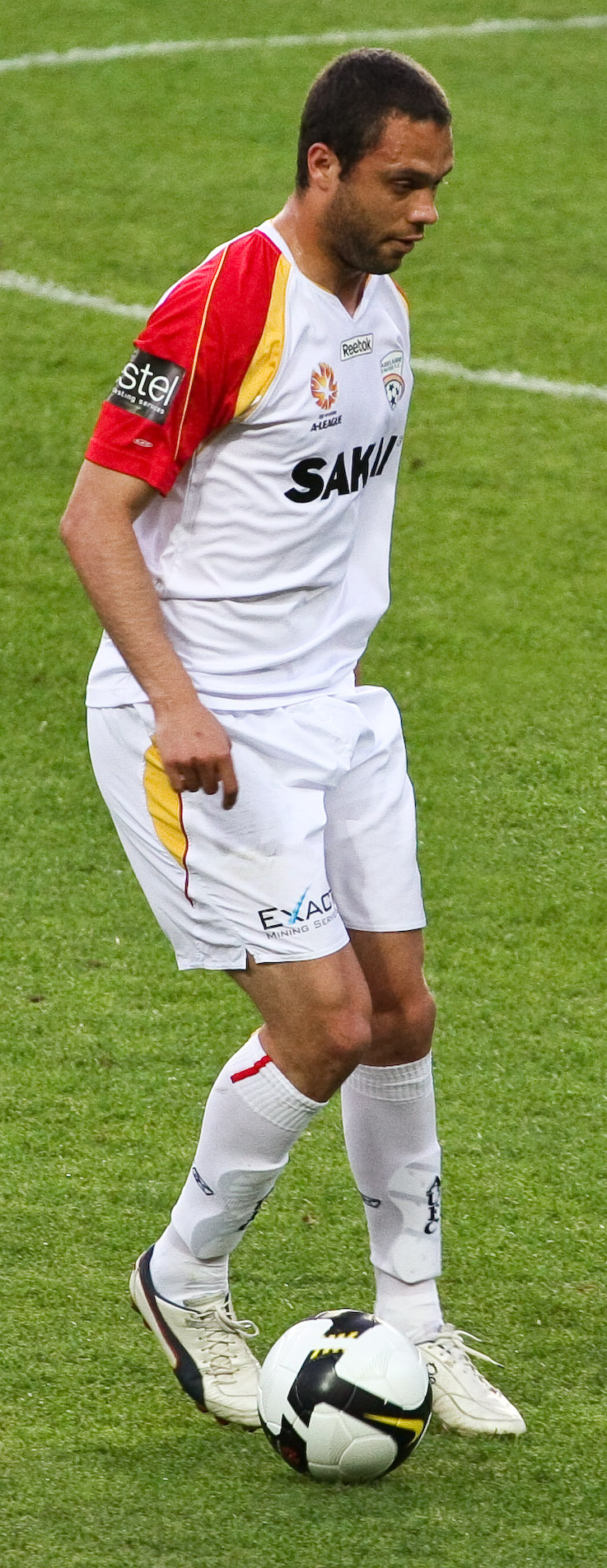
- Alemão with Adelaide United in 2008

Personal information
- Full name: Everson Arantes de Oliveira
- Date of birth: 29 November 1982 (age 43)
- Place of birth: Ituverava, São Paulo, Brazil
- Height: 1.82 m (6 ft 0 in)
- Positions: Right back; right winger

Youth career
- 1999–2001: Cruzeiro

Senior career*
Years	Team	Apps	(Gls)
2001–2003	Cruzeiro	4	(0)
2003	América		
2004	Cruzeiro		
2005	Guarani		
2006	Juventude		
2006–2007	Cruzeiro	0	(0)
2007–2008	Juventude		(2)
2008–2010	Adelaide United	36	(3)
2011	Santo André	4	(0)
- * Club domestic league appearances and goals as of 12 September 2011

Everson Arantes de Oliveira, better known as Alemão, is a Brazilian footballer who last played for Esporte Clube Santo André in the Campeonato Brasileiro Série C.

== Biography ==
Alemão played for Paulista State Division club Clube Atlético Juventus, deployed mainly as a right defender.

On 15 May 2008, he was signed by Adelaide United as a replacement for retiring club legend Richie Alagich. In round 9 of the 2008–09 A-League season he scored his first goal for Adelaide in the 2–1 win over Perth Glory in the process taking Adelaide to the top of the league table.

In January, 2009, Alemao scored his second goal for the club after coming off the bench against Sydney FC. He was released from Adelaide after their 2010 AFC Champions League campaign after they were knocked out of the round of 16.

On 27 May 2011, it was announced Alemão had joined Santo André of Série C in Brazil.

== Career statistics ==
(Correct as of 17 February 2010)

Club	Season	League^{1}		Cup		International^{2}		Total	
Club	Season	Apps	Goals	Apps	Goals	Apps	Goals	Apps	Goals
Adelaide United	2008–09	18	2	3	0	3	0	24	2
Adelaide United	2009–10	16	1	0	0	0	0	16	1
Total								40	3

^{1} - includes A-League final series statistics
^{2} - includes FIFA Club World Cup statistics; AFC Champions League statistics are included in season commencing after group stages (i.e. 2008 ACL in 2008–09 A-League season etc.)

== Honours ==
With Cruzeiro Youth Team:

- Campeonato Mineiro de Juniores: 3x
