= Travis Dodd =

Australian football player

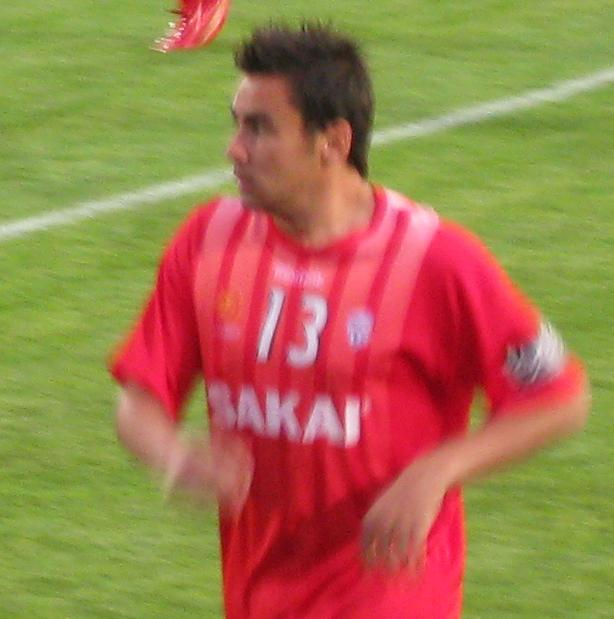
- Dodd warming-up for Adelaide United in 2008

Personal information
- Full name: Travis Garth Dodd
- Date of birth: 6 January 1980 (age 46)
- Place of birth: Adelaide, Australia
- Height: 1.77 m (5 ft 10 in)
- Positions: Winger; striker

Youth career
- St. Augustines
- 1996: SASI

Senior career*
Years	Team	Apps	(Gls)
1995–1997	Adelaide City	14	(5)
1996–1999	Adelaide City Force	32	(5)
1999–2000	Newcastle Breakers	32	(2)
2000–2003	Newcastle Jets	82	(9)
2003–2004	Parramatta Power	27	(6)
2004	Johor FC	5	(2)
2004–2005	Panionios	4	(0)
2005–2011	Adelaide United	137	(30)
2011–2014	Perth Glory	48	(9)
2016–2017	MetroStars	14	(3)
Total		381	(68)

International career
1997	Australia U-17	8	(1)
2000	Australia U-20	2	(0)
2006	Australia	2	(1)

Managerial career
- 2015: Bayswater City (assistant)
- 2017–2020: MetroStars (assistant)
- 2017–2020, 2024/25: Adelaide United (W-League) (assistant)
- 2020–2024: Croydon FC
- * Club domestic league appearances and goals as of 9 January 2016

Travis Dodd (born 6 January 1980) is an Australian football (soccer) coach and former football (soccer) player who last played for North Eastern MetroStars SC in the National Premier League – South Australia competition. He played as an attacking midfielder or winger and also played as a striker. He was the first Indigenous Australian to score for the Australian national team.

== Domestic career ==
Born in Adelaide, South Australia, Australia, he played junior football at Elizabeth before joining the South Australian Sports Institute in 1996. He was Adelaide City's fourth youngest National Soccer League (NSL) player of all time (16 years 281 days), and the fifth player in NSL history to score a hat-trick after coming on as a substitute (in a 4–1 win over Football Kingz in 2003).

At the conclusion of the 2003–04 NSL season, he moved abroad, playing firstly with Malaysian club Johor, then Greek club Panionios. During his stint with Panionios, Dodd scored in their UEFA Cup first round victory over high-profile Italian side Udinese Calcio. His career at the Greek club was short lived, with a change in manager seeing him frozen out of the senior squad. He made nine appearances for the club, four in the league, and five in the UEFA Cup.

=== Adelaide United ===
Dodd returned home to Adelaide in 2005 and was part of the Adelaide United side that won the 2005–06 A-League Premiership. On 23 May 2007, Dodd was the first Australian player to score a hat-trick in the Asian Champions League, scoring all three in a 3–0 win against Đồng Tâm Long An. After positive performances in the Asian Champions League, Dodd was linked with a move to Kashima Antlers.

Dodd took the captaincy of Adelaide United in July 2008 taking over from Michael Valkanis. He became Adelaide's fourth captain since its formation in 2003. During 2008 Dodd had a rich vein of form scoring 11 goals from midfield including a goal against New Zealand team Waitakere United in the FIFA Club World Cup that saw the team progress to the Quarterfinals. 2008 also saw Dodd become the first Adelaide United player to play 100 competitive games in which he scored the only goal in the 1–0 win over Perth Glory in round one of the 2008–09 A-League season.

=== Perth Glory ===
On 1 March 2011, it was announced that Dodd had signed a two-year contract with A-League club Perth Glory reportedly worth $200,000 per season with an option to extend the contract to a third year.

On 23 March 2013, Dodd tore his anterior cruciate ligament (ACL) in a league match against Melbourne Victory potentially sidelining him for 12 months.

On 4 April 2014, with Dodd still unable to play after more than a year of recovery, Perth Glory announced that his contract would not be renewed, thus leaving Dodd's further playing career in doubt.

=== MetroStars ===
On 7 February 2016, Dodd signed with South Australian club North Eastern MetroStars in the National Premier League. He again tore his ACL during the last game of the regular season, and has foreshadowed a move into coaching for 2017.

== International career ==
Dodd's debut international match for Australia was an AFC Cup qualifier against Kuwait at Allianz Stadium, on 16 August 2006. He scored the opening goal for the home side in a 2–0 win. Dodd's goal marked the first ever international goal scored by an Indigenous Australian player.

== Managerial career ==
Dodd joined W-League team Adelaide United during the 2017–18 Season as an assistant coach.
