= 2008–09 Melbourne Victory FC season =

Melbourne Victory
2008–2009 season
- Manager: Ernie Merrick
- A-League Championship: 1st
- Pre-Season Challenge Cup: Champions
- A-League Premiership: 1st
- Top goalscorer: Daniel Allsopp (13)
- Highest home attendance: 53,273 vs Adelaide United (28 February 2009)
- Lowest home attendance: 18,036 vs Perth Glory (4 October 2008)
- Average home league attendance: 24,516
Home colours	Away colours

The 2008-09 Hyundai A-League season was Melbourne Victory's fourth season. They finished top of the table at the end of the regular season and defeated Adelaide United in the Grand Final to take their second A-League title.

== Season summary ==
The 2008–09 season brought the start of the A-League Youth League and the introduction of the W-League with Melbourne fielding teams in both competitions. Melbourne actively recruited, bringing in Socceroo Michael Thwaite on a one-year loan, Costa Rican World Cup player José Luis López, as well as Ney Fabiano from Asian Champions League rivals Chonburi FC.

Melbourne's season got off to an optimal start, winning the Pre-Season Challenge Cup. A 0–0 draw resulted in a penalty shoot-out, with Victory winning 8–7 on penalties against Wellington Phoenix.

After winning the pre-season cup, the Victory were held to a 0–0 draw away against Sydney FC. They reinforced their premiership favouritism by coasting to 4–2 and 5–0 victories against Wellington Phoenix and the Newcastle Jets respectively. Despite this, they succumbed 0–2 to an undermanned Sydney side at the Telstra Dome in front of 31,564 fans.

On 6 December 2008, Melbourne Victory became the first A-League club to amass total crowd figures of 1,000,000 after their away match against Perth Glory.

On 24 January 2009, Melbourne Victory won its final game of the season against Wellington Phoenix. The 2–0 win in front of 28,905 fans placed Victory ahead of Adelaide United on goals scored for the premiership title, a margin United failed to achieve in its 1–0 win over the Central Coast Mariners.

The Victory kicked off their finals campaign on 7 February 2009 in the major semi-final first leg against bitter rival Adelaide United at Hindmarsh Stadium, a game which was won courtesy of goals from Carlos Hernández and Danny Allsopp. In the second leg Melbourne defeated Adelaide United 4–0 with goals from Archie Thompson, Hernandez, Allsopp and Tom Pondeljak, granting Melbourne passage to the Grand Final on a 6–0 aggregate.

Adelaide then defeated Queensland Roar to set up a rematch with Melbourne in the Grand Final, which the Victory won 1–0 with Tom Pondeljak scoring in the 59th minute to regain the A-League Championship and becoming the first A-League team to win their second championship, a feat since achieved by Sydney FC and Brisbane Roar.

== Players ==
=== First team squad ===
Note: Flags indicate national team as defined under FIFA eligibility rules; some limited exceptions apply. Players may hold more than one non-FIFA nationality.

No.	Pos.	Nation	Player
1	GK	AUS	Michael Theoklitos
2	MF	AUS	Kevin Muscat (captain)
3	DF	AUS	Michael Thwaite (loan)
4	DF	AUS	Steven Pace
5	DF	AUS	Sebastian Ryall (youth)
6	DF	AUS	Steve Pantelidis
7	DF	AUS	Matthew Kemp
8	MF	SCO	Grant Brebner
9	FW	AUS	Danny Allsopp
10	FW	AUS	Archie Thompson (marquee)
11	FW	BRA	Ney Fabiano

No.	Pos.	Nation	Player
12	DF	AUS	Rodrigo Vargas
13	FW	AUS	Nathan Elasi (youth)
14	MF	AUS	Billy Celeski
15	MF	AUS	Tom Pondeljak
16	MF	CRC	Carlos Hernández (loan)
17	MF	CRC	José Luis López
18	MF	AUS	Leigh Broxham
19	MF	AUS	Evan Berger
20	GK	AUS	Mitchell Langerak
21	DF	AUS	Daniel Vasilevski
22	MF	AUS	Nick Ward (marquee youth)

=== Transfers ===
In

Player	From	League	Fee	Date
(Australia) Billy Celeski	Perth Glory	(Australia) A-League	–	February 2008
(Australia) Tom Pondeljak	Central Coast Mariners	(Australia) A-League	–	February 2008
(Australia) Nathan Elasi	Marconi Stallions	(Australia) New South Wales Premier League	–	February 2008
(Australia) Steve Mautone*	Retired	(Australia) None	–	February 2008
(Brazil) Ney Fabiano	Chonburi FC	Thailand Premier League	US$13,500	1 July 2008
(Australia) Michael Thwaite	SK Brann	(Norway) Norwegian Premier League	Loan	1 July 2008
(Costa Rica) José Luis López	Deportivo Saprissa	Primera División de Costa Rica	Loan	14 July 2008

* Steve Mautone is the current Melbourne Victory Goalkeeping coach and was named as the third choice goalkeeper for the AFC Champions League

Out

Player	To	League	Fee	Date
(Australia) Ljubo Milicevic	Released	(Australia) –	–	February 2008
(Australia) Steve Mautone	Retired	(Australia) –	–	June 2008
(Australia) Adrian Caceres	Central Coast Mariners	(Australia) A-League	–	July 2008
(Australia) Daniel Piorkowski	Released	(Australia) –	–	July 2008
(Brazil) Leandro Love	Vissel Kobe (loan ended)	(Japan) J.League	–	July 2008
(Australia) Kaz Patafta	Newcastle Jets	(Australia) A-League	–	July 2008

== Matches ==
=== 2008 Pre-Season Cup fixtures ===
Group A
Team	Pld	W	D	L	GF	GA	GD	Pts	Qualification
Melbourne Victory	3	2	0	1	3	2	+1	6	Advances to final
Adelaide United	3	1	2	0	2	1	+1	5	
Newcastle Jets	3	0	2	1	1	2	−1	2	
Perth Glory	3	0	2	1	1	2	−1	2	

20 July 2008 Group Stage	Melbourne Victory	1 : 2	Adelaide United	Aurora Stadium, Launceston
13:00 UTC+10	Fabiano 8'	Report	33', 90' Cristiano	Attendance: 4,720; Referee: Ben Williams

26 July 2008 Group Stage	Perth Glory	0 : 1	Melbourne Victory	Members Equity Stadium, Perth
15:00 UTC+8		Report	11' M. Thwaite	Attendance: 3,020

2 August 2008 Group Stage	Newcastle Jets	0 : 1	Melbourne Victory	Port Macquarie Regional Stadium, Port Macquarie
14:30 UTC+10		Report	82' T. Pondeljak	Attendance: 3,133

6 August 2008 Final	Wellington Phoenix	0 : 0	Melbourne Victory	Westpac Stadium, Wellington
19:30 UTC+12		(7–8 PSO); Report		Attendance: 9,208; Referee: Peter O'Leary

=== 2008-09 Hyundai A-League fixtures ===
16 August 2008 Round 1	Sydney FC	0 : 0	Melbourne Victory	Sydney Football Stadium, Sydney
19:00 UTC+10		Report		Attendance: 16,227; Referee: Mark Shield

24 August 2008 Round 2	Wellington Phoenix	2 : 4	Melbourne Victory	Westpac Stadium, Wellington
17:00 UTC+12	Smeltz 29', 65' (pen.)	Report	Allsopp 16', 35'; Ney Fabiano 47'; Muscat 68' (pen.)	Attendance: 6,110; Referee: Strebre Delovski

29 August 2008 Round 3	Melbourne Victory	5 : 0	Newcastle Jets	Telstra Dome, Melbourne
18:00 UTC+10	Hernández 41'; A. Thompson 45+2'; Allsopp 61' 64'; Brebner 90'			Attendance: 22,589; Referee: Mark Shield

12 September 2008 Round 4	Melbourne Victory	1 : 0	Adelaide United	Telstra Dome, Melbourne
18:00 UTC+10	Ney Fabiano (red card) 29'; Muscat 64'			Attendance: 24,812; Referee: Matthew Breeze

20 September 2008 Round 5	Central Coast Mariners	2 : 2	Melbourne Victory	Bluetongue Stadium, Gosford
19:00 UTC+10	Simon 12' 84'	Report; Summary	A. Thompson 16' 90+4'; Theoklitos (red card) 57'	Attendance: 9,009; Referee: Peter Green

28 September 2008 Round 6	Melbourne Victory	0 : 2	Queensland Roar	Telstra Dome, Melbourne
17:00 UTC+10	Hernández (yellow card) 48' (yellow-red card) 58'	Report; Summary	Minniecon 83'; Zullo 90+4'	Attendance: 22,266; Referee: Ben Williams

4 October 2008 Round 7	Melbourne Victory	4 : 0	Perth Glory	Telstra Dome, Melbourne
17:00 UTC+10	Brebner 25'; Allsopp 39' 71'; Vargas 46'			Attendance: 18,036; Referee: Srebre Delovski

18 October 2008 Round 8	Newcastle Jets	1 : 0	Melbourne Victory	EnergyAustralia Stadium, Newcastle
19:00 UTC+11	Jesic 85'		A. Thompson (red card) 58'	Attendance: 11,384; Referee: Matthew Breeze

25 October 2008 Round 9	Melbourne Victory	0 : 2	Sydney FC	Telstra Dome, Melbourne
19:00 UTC+11		Summary	Bridge 20'; Aloisi 62'	Attendance: 31,654; Referee: Ben Williams

31 October 2008 Round 10	Adelaide United	2 : 3	Melbourne Victory	Hindmarsh Stadium, Adelaide
19:30 UTC+10:30	Travis Dodd 28' (pen.); Cássio 67'	Report; Summary	Muscat 55' (pen.); Muscat 81' (pen.); Billy Celeski 84'	Attendance: 13,191; Referee: Matthew Breeze

8 November 2008 Round 11	Queensland Roar	0 : 1	Melbourne Victory	Suncorp Stadium, Brisbane
19:00 UTC+10		Summary	Thompson 71'	Attendance: 12,022; Referee: Peter O'Leary

21 November 2008 Round 12	Melbourne Victory	2 : 1	Central Coast Mariners	Telstra Dome, Melbourne
20:00 UTC+11	Tom Pondeljak 37'; A. Thompson 60'	Report; Summary	John Hutchinson 34'	Attendance: 21,455; Referee: Srebre Delovski

28 November 2008 Round 13	Wellington Phoenix	2 : 1	Melbourne Victory	Westpac Stadium, Wellington
19:30 UTC+13	Brown 21'; Smeltz 58'		Allsopp 20'	Attendance: 7,593; Referee: Craig Zetter

6 December 2008 Round 14	Perth Glory	3 : 1	Melbourne Victory	Members Equity Stadium, Perth
18:00 UTC+9	Dadi 19', 23'; Pellegrino 79'	Report; Summary	Ney Fabiano 55'	Attendance: 6,621; Referee: Peter Green

19 December 2008 Round 15	Newcastle Jets	4 : 2	Melbourne Victory	EnergyAustralia Stadium, Newcastle
20:00 UTC+11	M. Thompson 16', 45', 49'; Song 60'	Report; Summary	Allsopp 66'; Ney Fabiano 87'	Attendance: 6,268; Referee: Craig Zetter

27 December 2008 Round 16	Melbourne Victory	3 : 2	Sydney FC	Telstra Dome, Melbourne
19:00 UTC+11	Thompson 14'; Ward 71'; Ney Fabiano 80'	Report; Summary	Cole 1'; Gan 4'	Attendance: 25,395; Referee: Matthew Breeze

2 January 2009 Round 17	Melbourne Victory	2 : 1	Queensland Roar	Telstra Dome, Melbourne
20:00 UTC+11	Allsopp 55'; Vargas 67'	Summary; Report	Moore 75'	Attendance: 23,447; Referee: Peter O’Leary

6 January 2009 Round 18	Melbourne Victory	1 : 0	Adelaide United	Telstra Dome, Melbourne
19:30 UTC+11	Ward 58'	Report; Summary		Attendance: 27,196; Referee: Matthew Breeze

11 January 2009 Round 19	Perth Glory	3 : 2	Melbourne Victory	Members Equity Stadium, Perth
18:00 UTC+9	Dadi 32', 76'; Rukavytsya 36'	Summary	Allsopp 3'; Ney Fabiano 48'; Kemp (yellow card) 33' (yellow-red card) 88'	Attendance: 9,381; Referee: Chris Beath

16 January 2009 Round 20	Melbourne Victory	3 : 0	Central Coast Mariners	Telstra Dome, Melbourne
20:00 UTC+11	Allsopp 68'; Hernández 71'; A. Thompson 75'	Summary	Heffernan (red card) 87'	Attendance: 24,003; Referee: Peter Green

23 January 2009 Round 21	Melbourne Victory	2 : 0	Wellington Phoenix	Telstra Dome, Melbourne
20:00 UTC+11	K. Muscat 40' (pen.); A. Thompson 90'	Report; Summary		Attendance: 28,905; Referee: Srebre Delovski

=== 2008-09 finals series ===
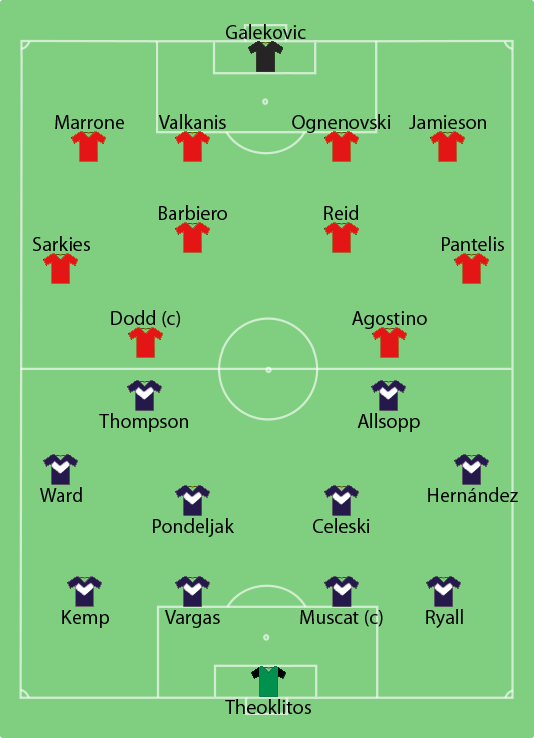
7 February 2009 Major Semi Final Leg 1	Adelaide United	0 : 2	Melbourne Victory,	Hindmarsh Stadium, Adelaide
18:30 UTC+10:30 Adelaide Starting XI: 20 (Australia) GK Eugene Galeković; 05 (Australia) DF Michael Valkanis (substituted off) 46'; 07 (Australia) MF Lucas Pantelis; 08 (Australia) MF Kristian Sarkies (substituted off) 41'; 09 (Australia) FW Paul Agostino (substituted off) 72'; 13 (Australia) FW Travis Dodd (c); 14 (Australia) DF Scott Jamieson; 18 (Australia) MF Fabian Barbiero; 19 (Australia) DF Saša Ognenovski; 24 (Australia) MF Paul Reid; 27 (Australia) DF Michael Marrone; Substitutes: 30 (Australia) GK Mark Birighitti; 03 (Brazil) MF Alemão (substituted on) 41'; 10 (Brazil) FW Cristiano (substituted on) 72'; 16 (Australia) DF Daniel Mullen (substituted on) 46'; 28 (Australia) MF Rostyn Griffiths; Manager: (Australia) Aurelio Vidmar	S. Ognenovski (yellow card) 5'; S. Jamieson (yellow card) 35' Adelaide	(0:1); Report; Summary; Man of the Match: (Costa Rica) Carlos Hernández	13' C. Hernández; (yellow card) 51' N. Ward; (yellow card) 54' K. Muscat; 89' D. Allsopp Melbourne	Attendance: 14,119; Referee: (Australia) Srebre Delovski Melbourne Starting XI: 01 (Australia) GK Michael Theoklitos; 02 (Australia) DF Kevin Muscat (c); 05 (Australia) DF Sebastian Ryall; 07 (Australia) DF Matthew Kemp (substituted off) 65'; 09 (Australia) FW Danny Allsopp; 10 (Australia) FW Archie Thompson; 12 (Australia) DF Rodrigo Vargas; 14 (Australia) MF Billy Celeski; 15 (Australia) MF Tom Pondeljak; 16 (Costa Rica) MF Carlos Hernández (substituted off) 76'; 22 (Australia) MF Nick Ward (substituted off) 56'; Substitutes: 20 (Australia) GK Mitchell Langerak; 08 (Scotland) MF Grant Brebner (substituted on) 56'; 11 (Brazil) MF Ney Fabiano; 17 (Costa Rica) FW José Luis López (substituted on) 76'; 19 (Australia) FW Evan Berger (substituted on) 65'; Manager: (Scotland) Ernie Merrick

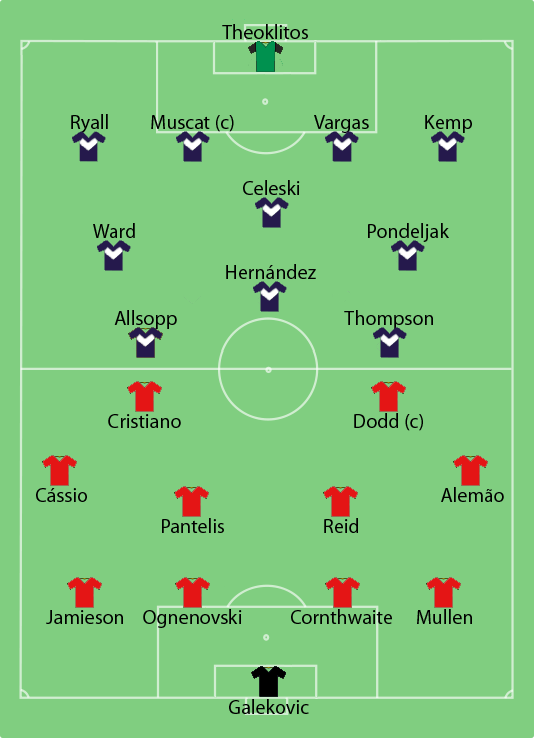
14 February 2009 Major Semi Final Leg 2	Melbourne Victory	4 : 0	Adelaide United	Telstra Dome, Melbourne
19:30 UTC+11:30 Melbourne Starting XI: 01 (Australia) GK Michael Theoklitos; 02 (Australia) DF Kevin Muscat (c); 05 (Australia) DF Sebastian Ryall; 07 (Australia) DF Matthew Kemp; 09 (Australia) FW Danny Allsopp; 10 (Australia) FW Archie Thompson; 12 (Australia) DF Rodrigo Vargas; 14 (Australia) MF Billy Celeski (substituted off) 76'; 15 (Australia) MF Tom Pondeljak; 16 (Costa Rica) MF Carlos Hernández (substituted off) 59'; 22 (Australia) MF Nick Ward (substituted off) 79'; Substitutes: 20 (Australia) GK Mitchell Langerak; 08 (Scotland) MF Grant Brebner (substituted on) 59'; 11 (Brazil) MF Ney Fabiano (substituted on) 79'; 17 (Costa Rica) FW José Luis López (substituted on) 76'; 19 (Australia) FW Evan Berger; Manager: (Scotland) Ernie Merrick	A. Thompson 10'; C. Hernández 24'; D. Allsopp 44'; T. Pondeljak 48'; Nick Ward (yellow card) 51' Melbourne	(3:0); Report; Summary; Man of the Match: (Costa Rica) Carlos Hernández	(yellow card) 30' S. Ognenovski; (yellow card) 53' R. Griffiths; (yellow card) 62' (yellow-red card) 81' Cássio; (yellow card) 88' T. Dodd Adelaide	Attendance: 34,736; Referee: (Australia) Matthew Breeze Adelaide Starting XI: 20 (Australia) GK Eugene Galeković; 02 (Australia) DF Robert Cornthwaite; 03 (Brazil) MF Alemão (substituted off) 56'; 06 (Brazil) MF Cássio; 07 (Australia) MF Lucas Pantelis (substituted off) 46'; 10 (Brazil) FW Cristiano; 13 (Australia) FW Travis Dodd (c); 14 (Australia) DF Scott Jamieson; 16 (Australia) DF Daniel Mullen; 19 (Australia) DF Saša Ognenovski; 24 (Australia) MF Paul Reid; Substitutes: 30 (Australia) GK Mark Birighitti; 09 (Australia) FW Paul Agostino; 18 (Australia) MF Fabian Barbiero (substituted on) 56'; 27 (Australia) DF Michael Marrone; 28 (Australia) MF Rostyn Griffiths (substituted on) 46'; Manager: (Australia) Aurelio Vidmar

28 February 2009 Grand Final	Melbourne Victory	1 : 0	Adelaide United	Telstra Dome, Melbourne
19:30 UTC+11 Melbourne Starting XI: 01 (Australia) GK Michael Theoklitos; 02 (Australia) DF Kevin Muscat (c); 05 (Australia) DF Sebastian Ryall; 07 (Australia) DF Matthew Kemp; 09 (Australia) FW Daniel Allsopp; 10 (Australia) FW Archie Thompson; 12 (Australia) DF Rodrigo Vargas; 14 (Australia) MF Billy Celeski; 15 (Australia) MF Tom Pondeljak (substituted off) 83'; 16 (Costa Rica) MF Carlos Hernández; 22 (Australia) MF Nick Ward (substituted off) 56'; Substitutes: 20 (Australia) GK Mitchell Langerak; 8 (Scotland) MF Grant Brebner (substituted on) 83'; 11 (Brazil) FW Ney Fabiano; 17 (Costa Rica) MF José Luis López (substituted on) 89'; 19 (Australia) MF Evan Berger (substituted on) 56' (substituted off) 89'; Manager: (Scotland) Ernie Merrick	T. Pondeljak 60' (yellow card) 61'; D. Allsopp (red card) 65' Melbourne	(0:0)Report; Summary; Joe Marston Medal: (Australia) Tom Pondeljak	(red card) 10' Cristiano; (yellow card) 37' S. Ognenovski; (yellow card) 56' S. Jamieson; (yellow card) 64' F. Barbiero; (yellow card) 81' R. Cornthwaite; (yellow card) 90' T. Dodd (c) Adelaide	Attendance: 53,273; Referee: Matthew Breeze Adelaide Starting XI: 20 (Australia) GK Eugene Galeković; 02 (Australia) DF Robert Cornthwaite; 07 (Australia) MF Lucas Pantelis (substituted off) 63'; 10 (Brazil) FW Cristiano; 13 (Australia) MF Travis Dodd (c); 14 (Australia) DF Scott Jamieson (substituted off) 73'; 15 (Australia) MF Jonas Salley; 16 (Australia) DF Daniel Mullen; 18 (Australia) MF Fabian Barbiero; 19 (Australia) DF Saša Ognenovski; 24 (Australia) MF Paul Reid; Substitutes: 30 (Australia) GK Mark Birighitti; 03 (Brazil) FW Alemão; 06 (Brazil) MF Cássio (substituted on) 73'; 09 (Australia) FW Paul Agostino (substituted on) 63'; 28 (Australia) MF Rostyn Griffiths; Manager: (Australia) Aurelio Vidmar

== Statistics ==
=== Goals ===
Total	Player		Goals per Round																							
Total	Player		1	2	3	4	5	6	7	8	9	10	11	12	13	14	15	16	17	18	19	20	21	S1	S2	GF
13	(Australia)	Daniel Allsopp		2	2				2						1			1		1	1	1		1	1	
9	(Australia)	Archie Thompson			1		2						1	1					1			1	1		1	
5	(Brazil)	Ney Fabiano		1												1		1	1		1					
5	(Australia)	Kevin Muscat		1		1						2											1			
4	(Costa Rica)	Carlos Hernández			1																	1		1	1	
3	(Australia)	Tom Pondeljak												1											1	1
2	(Scotland)	Grant Brebner			1				1																	
2	(Australia)	Rodrigo Vargas							1											1						
2	(Australia)	Nick Ward															1		1							
1	(Australia)	Billy Celeski										1														

A goal was scored from a penalty kick
Two goals were scored from penalty kicks

== A-League ==
=== Ladder ===
Pos	Team	Pld	W	D	L	GF	GA	GD	Pts	Qualification
1	Melbourne Victory (C)	21	12	2	7	39	27	+12	38	Qualification for 2010 AFC Champions League group stage and Finals series
2	Adelaide United	21	11	5	5	31	19	+12	38	Qualification for 2010 AFC Champions League group stage and Finals series
3	Queensland Roar	21	10	6	5	36	25	+11	36	Qualification for Finals series
4	Central Coast Mariners	21	7	7	7	35	32	+3	28	Qualification for Finals series
5	Sydney FC	21	7	5	9	33	32	+1	26	
6	Wellington Phoenix	21	7	5	9	23	31	−8	26	
7	Perth Glory	21	6	4	11	31	44	−13	22	
8	Newcastle Jets	21	4	6	11	21	39	−18	18	

Source: ultimatealeague.com
Rules for classification: 1) points; 2) goal difference; 3) number of goals scored.
(C) Champions

=== Finals series ===
Semifinals
Melbourne Victory	2	4
Adelaide United	0	0
Queensland Roar	2	2
Central Coast Mariners	0	1

Preliminary final
Adelaide United	1
Queensland Roar	0

Final
Melbourne Victory	1
Adelaide United	0

=== 2008–09 Awards ===
- Victory Medal
  - Kevin Muscat and Danny Allsopp
- Players' Player of the Year
  - Rodrigo Vargas
- Clubman of the Year
  - Evan Berger
- Golden Boot
  - Danny Allsopp
- Women's Player of the Year
  - Brittany Timko
- Youth Team Player of the Year
  - Matthew Theodore

Preceded by Central Coast Mariners	A-League Premiers; 2008–09	Succeeded by Incumbent
Preceded by Sydney FC	A-League Champions; 2006–07	Succeeded by Newcastle Jets
