= 2009 A-League Grand Final =

- Event: 2008–09 A-League
Melbourne Victory	Adelaide United
1	0
- Date: 28 February 2009
- Venue: Telstra Dome, Melbourne, Victoria, Australia
- Man of the Match: Tom Pondeljak, Melbourne Victory
- Referee: Matthew Breeze
- Attendance: 53,273

The 2009 A-League Grand Final took place at Telstra Dome in Melbourne, Australia on 28 February 2009.

It was the final match in the A-League 2008–09 season, and was played between premiers Melbourne Victory and runners-up Adelaide United. Melbourne Victory won the match 1–0 and became the winners of the 2008–09 Championship, thus becoming the first team to win the A-League domestic treble, after also claiming the 2008 Pre-Season Challenge Cup, and the 2008–09 Premiership.

The Grand Final was the last event to be held at the Telstra Dome, the former name of Melbourne's Docklands Stadium. Due to a change in sponsorship, the stadium is now known as Etihad Stadium.

== Route to the finals ==
Semifinals
Melbourne Victory	2	4
Adelaide United	0	0
Queensland Roar	2	2
Central Coast Mariners	0	1

Preliminary final
Adelaide United	1
Queensland Roar	0

Final
Melbourne Victory	1
Adelaide United	0

== Match ==
=== Summary ===
With both teams down to ten men for the last 25 minutes, Adelaide were left scoreless with Melbourne taking their second A-League championship medal. Pondeljak's goal earned him the prestigious Joe Marston Medal.

A contentious early red card given to the lone Adelaide striker Cristiano by referee Matthew Breeze saw the Reds go down to ten men by the tenth minute. However, Adelaide managed to hold back Melbourne from scoring until Tom Pondeljak scored 23 metres out from goal in the 60th minute to allow Melbourne to take the lead.

Five minutes later, Melbourne striker Daniel Allsopp was also sent off for allegedly headbutting Adelaide's Robert Cornthwaite in an incident in the Melbourne penalty box.

Both Cristiano and Allsopp's red cards were revoked by the Football Federation Australia in a post-match conference.

=== Details ===
28 February 2009
19:30 UTC+11

Melbourne Victory	1–0	Adelaide United
Pondeljak 60'	Reports

Telstra Dome, Melbourne
Attendance: 53,273
Referee: Matthew Breeze

Melbourne Victory	Adelaide United

GK	1	(Australia) Michael Theoklitos
RB	5	(Australia) Sebastian Ryall
CB	2	(Australia) Kevin Muscat (c)
CB	12	(Australia) Rodrigo Vargas
LB	7	(Australia) Matthew Kemp
DM	14	(Australia) Billy Celeski
RM	15	(Australia) Tom Pondeljak	(yellow card) 61'	(substituted off) 83'
LM	22	(Australia) Nick Ward		(substituted off) 56'
AM	16	(Costa Rica) Carlos Hernández
CF	9	(Australia) Daniel Allsopp	(red card) 65'
CF	10	(Australia) Archie Thompson
Substitutes:
GK	20	(Australia) Mitchell Langerak
MF	8	(Scotland) Grant Brebner		(substituted on) 83'
FW	11	(Brazil) Ney Fabiano
MF	17	(Costa Rica) José Luis López		(substituted on) 89'
MF	19	(Australia) Evan Berger		(substituted on) 56'	(substituted off) 89'
Manager:
(Scotland) Ernie Merrick

GK	20	(Australia) Eugene Galeković
RB	16	(Australia) Daniel Mullen
CB	19	(Australia) Saša Ognenovski	(yellow card) 37'
CB	2	(Australia) Robert Cornthwaite	(yellow card) 81'
LB	14	(Australia) Scott Jamieson	(yellow card) 56'	(substituted off) 73'
DM	15	(Ivory Coast) Jonas Salley
DM	24	(Australia) Paul Reid
RW	13	(Australia) Travis Dodd (c)	(yellow card) 90'
AM	18	(Australia) Fabian Barbiero	(yellow card) 64'
LW	7	(Australia) Lucas Pantelis		(substituted off) 63'
CF	10	(Brazil) Cristiano	(red card) 10'
Substitutes:
GK	30	(Australia) Mark Birighitti
FW	3	(Brazil) Alemão
DF	6	(Brazil) Cássio		(substituted on) 73'
FW	9	(Australia) Paul Agostino		(substituted on) 63'
MF	28	(Australia) Rostyn Griffiths
Manager:
(Australia) Aurelio Vidmar

Joe Marston Medal:
Tom Pondeljak (Melbourne Victory)

Assistant referees:
Matthew Cream
Fourth official:
Peter Green

Match rules

- 90 minutes
- 30 minutes of extra time if necessary.
- Penalty shoot-out if scores still level.

A-League
2009 Champions

Melbourne Victory
Second Title

=== Statistics ===
	Melbourne	Adelaide
Attempts at goal	15	9
Attempts on target	6	3
Attempts off target	9	6
Attempts – Woodwork	0	0
Keeper saves	2	4
Ball possession	50%	50%
Corners	8	2
Fouls committed	17	19
Offsides	2	1
Yellow cards	1	5
Red cards	1	1

== Controversy ==
The red card to Adelaide talisman Cristiano after just 10 minutes in the championship decider against Melbourne Victory created a lot of controversy post match. The Brazilian starlet had been warned before that referee Matthew Breeze would send him off if he suspected anything untoward about his heading with flailing arms. He felt as though he was a marked man all season by referee Matthew Breeze " I couldn't sleep after the game."

Fox Sports analyst and Former Australia international Robbie Slater claimed the referee made the wrong call, "ruined" the Grand Final and argued that the A-League should hire an elite overseas official to handle its championship game.

== See also ==
- 2008–09 A-League
- List of A-League champions
