= List of Melbourne Victory FC head coaches =

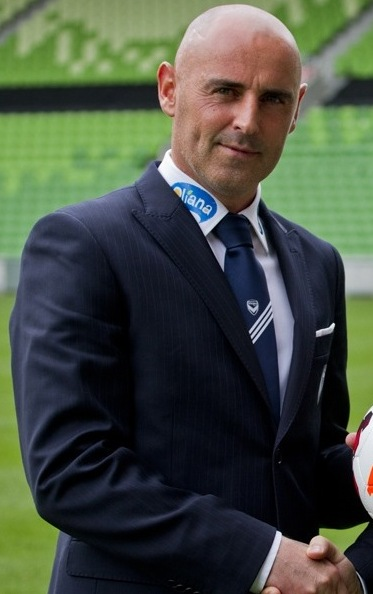
Kevin Muscat was the manager of Melbourne Victory from 2013 to 2019

Melbourne Victory Football Club is an Australian association football club based in Melbourne, Victoria. The club was formed as one of the foundation teams in the professional A-League, which commenced in 2005–06. The Victory won the A-League Championship for the first time in 2007. Since then, the club has won a further three Championships along with three Premierships and an FFA Cup title.

This chronological list comprises all those who have held the position of manager of the first team of Melbourne Victory. Each manager's entry includes his dates of tenure and the club's overall competitive record (in terms of matches won, drawn and lost), honours won and significant achievements while under his care. Caretaker managers are included, as well as those who have been in permanent charge.

== Managers ==
- Statistics are sourced from ALeagueStats.com. Names of caretaker managers are supplied where known, and periods of caretaker management are highlighted in italics and marked † or ‡, depending on the scenario. Win percentage is rounded to two decimal places.
- Only first-team competitive matches are counted. Wins, losses and draws are results at the final whistle; the results of penalty shoot-outs are not counted.
- Statistics are complete up to and including the match played on 2 May 2026.

Key

- M = matches played; W = matches won; D = matches drawn; L = matches lost; GF = Goals for; GA = Goals against; Win % = percentage of total matches won
- † Managers with this background and symbol in the "Name" column are italicised to denote caretaker appointments.
- ‡ Managers with this background and symbol in the "Name" column are italicised to denote caretaker appointments promoted to full-time manager.

List of Melbourne Victory FC managers
Name	Nationality	From	To	M	W	D	L	GF	GA	Win %	Honours
Ernie Merrick	Scotland	21 December 2004	13 March 2011	189	81	45	63	282	176	42.86	A-League premiers: 2006–07, 2008–09; A-League champions: 2007, 2009; Pre-Season Challenge Cup winners: 2008
Mehmet Duraković	Australia	13 March 2011	6 January 2012	14	3	6	5	17	16	21.43	
Kevin Muscat †	Australia	6 January 2012	8 January 2012	1	1	0	0	2	1	100.00	
Jim Magilton	Northern Ireland	8 January 2012	2 April 2012	12	2	5	5	16	16	16.67	
Ange Postecoglou	Australia	27 April 2012	23 October 2013	32	15	7	10	53	41	46.88	
Kevin Muscat	Australia	23 October 2013	22 May 2019	214	105	45	64	374	234	49.07	A-League premiers: 2014–15; A-League champions: 2015, 2018; Australia Cup winners: 2015
Marco Kurz	Germany	28 June 2019	15 January 2020	15	4	3	8	19	21	26.67	
Carlos Salvachúa †	Spain	15 January 2020	30 May 2020	11	4	2	5	14	14	36.36	
Grant Brebner ‡	Scotland	11 June 2020	17 April 2021	26	5	3	18	29	59	19.23	
Steve Kean †	Scotland	19 April 2021	6 June 2021	8	1	1	6	9	16	12.50	
Tony Popovic	Australia	6 June 2021	12 June 2024	85	34	26	25	120	101	40.00	Australia Cup winners: 2021
Patrick Kisnorbo	Australia	25 June 2024	17 December 2024	7	5	1	1	12	4	71.43	
Arthur Diles ‡	Australia	18 December 2024	19 May 2026	51	20	13	18	83	73	39.22	
