= A-League Men records and statistics =

A-League Men records

The A-League Men is an Australian professional league for association football clubs. At the top of the Australian soccer league system, it is the country's primary soccer competition and is contested by 12 clubs. The competition was formed in April 2004, following a number of issues including financial problems in the National Soccer League. Those records and statistics of the A-League Men are listed below. All updated as of 31 December 2023.

== Team records ==
=== Titles ===
- Most Premiership titles: 4, Sydney FC
- Most Championship titles: 5, Sydney FC
- Most consecutive Premiership title wins: 2:
  - Sydney FC (2016–17, 2017–18);
  - Melbourne City (2020–21, 2021–22)
- Most consecutive Championship title wins: 2:
  - Brisbane Roar (2011, 2012);
  - Sydney FC (2019, 2020);
  - Central Coast Mariners (2023, 2024)
- Biggest Premiership title winning margin: 17 points, 2016–17; Sydney FC (66 points) over Melbourne Victory (49 points)
- Smallest Premiership title winning margin: 0 points and same goal difference, 2008–09; Melbourne Victory over Adelaide United through more goals scored.

=== Points ===
- Most points in a season: 66, Sydney FC (2016–17)
- Most home points in a season: 33, Brisbane Roar (2010–11, 2013–14)
- Most away points in a season: 34, Sydney FC (2014–15)
- Fewest points in a season: 6, New Zealand Knights (2005–06)
- Fewest home points in a season: 2, New Zealand Knights (2005–06)
- Fewest away points in a season: 4, New Zealand Knights (2005–06)
- Most points in a season without winning the league: 57, Central Coast Mariners (2010–11)
- Fewest points in a season while winning the league: 34, Central Coast Mariners (2007–08)

=== Wins ===
- Most wins in total: 231, Sydney FC
- Most wins in a season: 20, Sydney FC (2016–17, 2017–18)
- Most home wins in a season: 10
  - Brisbane Roar (2010–11, 2013–14)
  - Sydney FC (2016–17)
- Most away wins in a season: 10
  - Western Sydney Wanderers (2012–13)
  - Sydney FC (2016–17)
- Fewest wins in a season: 1, New Zealand Knights (2005–06)
- Fewest home wins in a season: 0, New Zealand Knights (2005–06)
- Fewest away wins in a season: 1, New Zealand Knights (2005–06)
- Most consecutive wins: 10, Western Sydney Wanderers (13 January 2013 – 16 March 2013)
- Most consecutive home wins: 8, Melbourne Victory (21 November 2008 – 28 February 2009)
- Most consecutive away wins: 8, Melbourne Victory (9 September 2006 – 30 December 2006)
- Most consecutive games without a win: 19
  - New Zealand Knights (18 September 2005 – 27 August 2006)
  - Melbourne City (24 February 2013 – 17 January 2014)
- Most consecutive home games without a win: 11, New Zealand Knights (2 September 2005 – 27 August 2006)
- Most consecutive away games without a win: 22, Melbourne City (2 February 2012 – 16 February 2014)

=== Defeats ===
- Most defeats in total: 208, Central Coast Mariners
- Most defeats in a season: 20, Central Coast Mariners (2015–16 & 2018–19)
- Most home defeats in a season: 9, North Queensland Fury (2010–11)
- Most away defeats in a season: 12, Melbourne City (2012–13)
- Fewest defeats in a season: 1
  - Brisbane Roar (2010–11)
  - Sydney FC (2016–17)
- Fewest home defeats in a season: 0
  - Brisbane Roar (2010–11)
  - Sydney FC (2016–17)
- Fewest away defeats in a season: 0, Sydney FC (2014–15)
- Most consecutive games undefeated: 36, Brisbane Roar (18 September 2010 – 26 November 2011)
- Most consecutive home games undefeated: 29, Sydney FC (2 April 2016 – 17 March 2018)
- Most consecutive away games undefeated: 16, Brisbane Roar (3 October 2010 – 19 November 2011)
- Most consecutive defeats: 11, New Zealand Knights (18 September 2005 – 26 November 2005)
- Most consecutive home defeats: 8, Brisbane Roar (16 March 2024 – 7 January 2025)
- Most consecutive away defeats: 9
  - New Zealand Knights (8 January 2006 – 26 November 2006)
  - Melbourne City (14 December 2012 – 30 March 2013)

=== Draws ===
- Most draws in total: 120, Brisbane Roar
- Most draws in a season: 12, Western Sydney Wanderers (2016–17), Melbourne Victory (2023–24)
- Most home draws in a season: 7
  - Central Coast Mariners (2009–10)
  - Melbourne Victory (2011–12)
  - Western Sydney Wanderers (2016–17)
- Most away draws in a season: 6
  - Central Coast Mariners (2005–06, 2010–11)
  - Brisbane Roar (2010–11)
  - Adelaide United (2011–12)
  - Sydney FC (2011–12)
- Fewest draws in a season: 2, Melbourne Victory (2008–09), Perth Glory (2017–18)
- Most consecutive draws: 6, Wellington Phoenix (4 September 2009 – 17 October 2009)
- Most consecutive home draws: 5, Perth Glory (28 December 2006 – 9 September 2007)
- Most consecutive away draws: 5, Western Sydney Wanderers (15 April 2017 – 12 November 2017)

=== Goals ===
- Most goals scored in a season: 64, Sydney FC (2017–18)
- Fewest goals scored in a season: 13, New Zealand Knights (2006–07)
- Most goals conceded in a season: 71, Brisbane Roar (2018–19)
- Fewest goals conceded in a season: 12, Sydney FC (2016–17)
- Best goal difference in a season: +43, Sydney FC (2016–17)
- Worst goal difference in a season: –39, Central Coast Mariners (2018–19)
- Most goals scored at home in a season: 35, Melbourne City (2015–16)
- Most goals scored away in a season: 30, Sydney FC (2016–17)
- Fewest goals scored at home in a season: 8, New Zealand Knights (2006–07)
- Fewest goals scored away in a season: 4, New Zealand Knights (2005–06)
- Most goals conceded at home in a season: 36, Brisbane Roar (2018–19)
- Most goals conceded away in a season: 38, Central Coast Mariners (2015–16)
- Fewest goals conceded at home in a season: 4, Sydney FC (2016–17)
- Fewest goals conceded away in a season: 8, Western Sydney Wanderers (2012–13), Sydney FC (2016–17)
- Most clean sheets in a season: 16, Sydney FC (2016–17)
- Fewest clean sheets in a season: 0, Central Coast Mariners (2015–16)
- Most clean sheets in total: 142, Sydney FC
- Fewest failures to score in a match in a season: 3, Brisbane Roar (2010–11)
- Most goals scored in total: 761, Melbourne Victory
- Most goals conceded in total: 721, Central Coast Mariners
- Most home goals scored in total: 434, Melbourne Victory
- Most home goals conceded in total: 341, Central Coast Mariners
- Most away goals scored in total: 358, Sydney FC
- Most away goals conceded in total: 402, Perth Glory

=== Disciplinary ===
- Most yellow cards in total: 1,038, Adelaide United
- Most red cards in total: 64, Melbourne Victory
- Most yellow cards in a season: 79, Sydney FC (2012–13 & 2015–16)
- Fewest yellow cards in one season: 23, Perth Glory (2005–06)
- Most red cards in one season: 10, Perth Glory (2010–11)
- Most yellow cards in one match: 11
  - Adelaide United v Melbourne Heart, 4 April 2014
  - Melbourne Heart v Western Sydney Wanderers, 12 April 2014
  - Melbourne Victory v Melbourne City, 4 February 2017
  - Sydney FC v Melbourne Victory, 7 May 2017
- Most red cards in one match: 3
  - Central Coast Mariners v Melbourne Victory, 4 November 2007
  - Perth Glory v Sydney FC, 7 February 2015
  - Adelaide United v Brisbane Roar, 2 February 2019
- Most fair play awards: 6, Brisbane Roar

== Scorelines ==
- Biggest home win: 8 goals, 8–0 (Melbourne City v Perth Glory, 14 April 2024)
- Biggest away win: 6 goals;
  - 2–8 (Central Coast Mariners v Newcastle Jets, 14 April 2018)
  - 2–8 (Central Coast Mariners v Wellington Phoenix, 9 March 2019)
- Highest scoring: 10 goals;
  - 2–8 (Central Coast Mariners v Newcastle Jets, 14 April 2018)
  - 2–8 (Central Coast Mariners v Wellington Phoenix, 9 March 2019)

== Attendances ==
- Highest attendance, single match: 61,880, Western Sydney Wanderers v Sydney FC, Stadium Australia, 8 October 2016)
- Lowest attendance, single match: 38, Wellington Phoenix v Brisbane Roar, Leichhardt Oval, 16 February 2022)
- Highest season average attendance: 31,374 – Melbourne Victory (2006–07)
- Lowest season average attendance: 3,022 – New Zealand Knights (2006–07)

These figures do not take into account the 2019–20 and 2020–21 seasons, when many matches had an attendance of zero due to the COVID-19 pandemic.

== Player records ==
=== Appearances ===
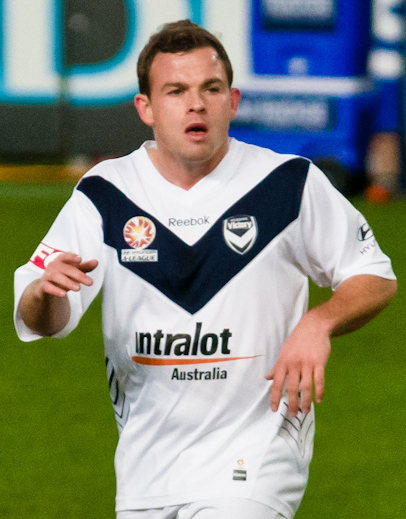
Leigh Broxham holds the record for most appearances in the A-League Men playing 383 matches overall.
- Most A-League Men appearances: 383
  - Leigh Broxham (7 January 2007 to mid 2024)
- Most different clubs played for: 7
  - Antony Golec (for Sydney FC, Adelaide United, Western Sydney Wanderers, Perth Glory, Central Coast Mariners, Wellington Phoenix and Macarthur FC)
  - Liam Reddy (for Newcastle Jets, Brisbane Roar, Wellington Phoenix, Sydney FC, Central Coast Mariners, Western Sydney Wanderers and Perth Glory)
- Youngest player: Alusine Fofanah, 15 years, 189 days (for Western Sydney Wanderers v Adelaide United, 19 January 2014)
- Oldest player: Romário, 40 years 320 days (for Adelaide United v Newcastle Jets, 15 December 2006)
- Most consecutive A-League Men appearances: 98, Alex Wilkinson (4 November 2007 until 13 March 2011)

Players currently playing in the A-League Men are highlighted in bold.

Most appearances (career)
| Rank | Player | Games | Playing position | First season | Last season |
|---|---|---|---|---|---|
| 1 | (Australia) Leigh Broxham | 383 | Midfielder | 2006–07 | 2023–24 |
| 2 | (Australia) Nikolai Topor-Stanley | 380 | Defender | 2006–07 | 2022–23 |
| 3 | (Australia) Alex Wilkinson | 365 | Defender | 2005–06 | 2022–23 |
| 4 | (New Zealand) Andrew Durante | 358 | Defender | 2005–06 | 2020–21 |
| 5 | (Australia) Liam Reddy | 350 | Goalkeeper | 2005–06 | 2022–23 |
| 6 | (Australia) Scott Jamieson | 322 | Defender | 2008–09 | 2022–23 |
| 7 | (Australia) Danny Vukovic | 316 | Goalkeeper | 2005–06 | 2023–24 |
| 8 | (New Zealand) **Kosta Barbarouses** | 306 | Forward | 2007–08 | 2023–24 |
| 9 | (Australia) **Scott Neville** | 295 | Defender | 2008–09 | 2023–24 |
| 10 | (Australia) Jason Hoffman | 294 | Defender | 2007–08 | 2023–24 |

=== Goals ===
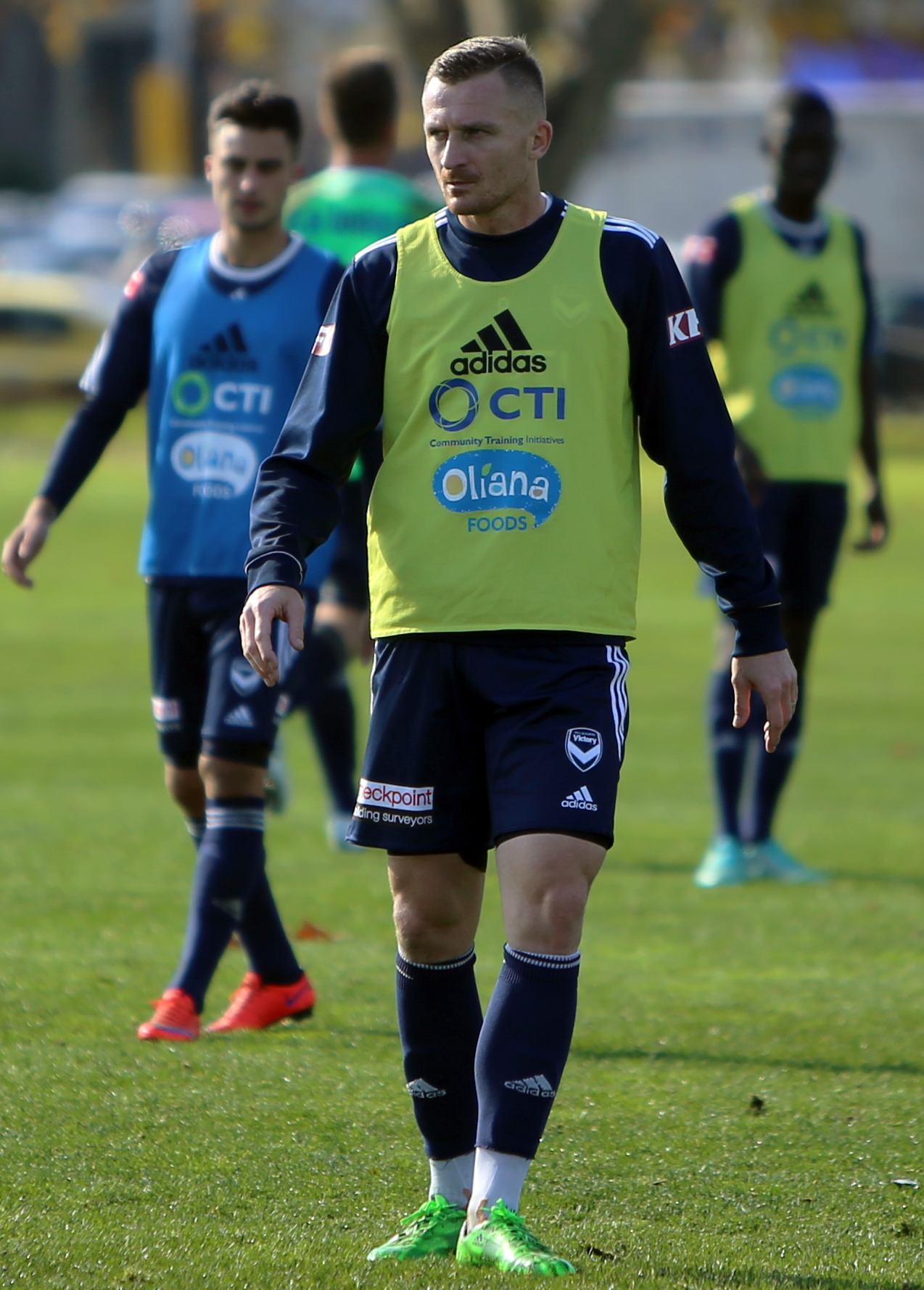
Besart Berisha was the first A-League goalscorer to reach 100 goals, scoring his 100th A-League goal in April 2017.

- First A-League Men goal: Carl Veart (for Adelaide United v. Newcastle Jets, 26 August 2005)
- Most A-League Men goals: 150, Jamie Maclaren
- Most goals in Finals series: 10
  - Besart Berisha
  - Archie Thompson
- Most goals in a match: 5
  - Archie Thompson (for Melbourne Victory v Adelaide United, 18 February 2007)
  - Jamie Maclaren (for Melbourne City v Melbourne Victory, 17 April 2021)
- Most goals in a season: 27, Bobô (for Sydney FC, 2017–18)
- Most appearances without scoring a goal: 150, Adam D'Apuzzo
- Most consecutive matches scored in: 8, Andy Keogh (for Perth Glory, 13 February 2016 – 3 April 2016)
- Most hat-tricks: 7, Jamie Maclaren
- Fastest hat-trick: 6 minutes, Besart Berisha (for Brisbane Roar v Adelaide United, 28 October 2011)
- Most own goals: 7, Nigel Boogaard
- Most penalties scored: 26, Jamie Maclaren

Players currently playing in the A-League Men are highlighted in bold.

Most goals (career)
| Rank | Player | Goals | Games | Ratio | Position | First goal | Last goal |
|---|---|---|---|---|---|---|---|
| 1 | (Australia) **Jamie Maclaren** | 150 | 215 | 0.70 | Forward | 2013–14 | 2023–24 |
| 2 | (Kosovo) Besart Berisha | 142 | 236 | 0.60 | Forward | 2011–12 | 2020–21 |
| 3 | (Australia) **Bruno Fornaroli** | 102 | 154 | 0.59 | Forward | 2015–16 | 2023–24 |
| 4 | (New Zealand) Shane Smeltz | 92 | 190 | 0.48 | Forward | 2007–08 | 2016–17 |
| 5 | (Australia) Archie Thompson | 90 | 224 | 0.40 | Forward | 2005–06 | 2015–16 |
| 6 | (New Zealand) **Kosta Barbarouses** | 84 | 306 | 0.27 | Forward | 2007–08 | 2023–24 |
| 7 | (Australia) Alex Brosque | 75 | 243 | 0.31 | Forward | 2005–06 | 2018–19 |
| 8 | (Australia) Matt Simon | 66 | 288 | 0.23 | Forward | 2006–07 | 2020–21 |
| 9 | (Australia) Mark Bridge | 63 | 251 | 0.25 | Forward | 2005–06 | 2018–19 |
| 10 | (England) Adam le Fondre | 62 | 106 | 0.58 | Forward | 2018–19 | 2022–23 |

=== Goalkeepers ===
Players currently playing in the A-League Men are highlighted in bold.

Most clean sheets (career)
| Rank | Player | Clean sheets | Games | Ratio | First season | Last season |
|---|---|---|---|---|---|---|
| 1 | (Australia) **Danny Vukovic** | 92 | 316 | 0.29 | 2005–06 | 2023–24 |
| 2 | (Australia) Liam Reddy | 90 | 350 | 0.26 | 2005–06 | 2022–23 |
| 3 | (Australia) Eugene Galekovic | 83 | 288 | 0.29 | 2005–06 | 2018–19 |
| 4 | (Australia) Michael Theo | 69 | 230 | 0.30 | 2005–06 | 2017–18 |
| 5 | (Australia) **Andrew Redmayne** | 63 | 248 | 0.25 | 2007–08 | 2023–24 |
| 6 | (New Zealand) Glen Moss | 53 | 250 | 0.21 | 2005–06 | 2019–20 |
| 7 | (Australia) Clint Bolton | 52 | 179 | 0.29 | 2005–06 | 2012–13 |
| 8 | (England) **Jamie Young** | 52 | 210 | 0.25 | 2014–15 | 2023–24 |
| 9 | (Australia) Ante Covic | 46 | 184 | 0.25 | 2006–07 | 2015–16 |
| 10 | (Australia) **Lawrence Thomas** | 44 | 158 | 0.28 | 2008–09 | 2023–24 |

- Most A-League Men clean sheets (career): 90, Liam Reddy
- Longest time without conceding a goal: 876 minutes, Michael Theo
- Most clean sheets in one season: 15, Danny Vukovic (2016–17)
- Most Goalkeeper of the Year Awards: 4, Eugene Galekovic
- Most goals scored by a goalkeeper: 1, Danny Vukovic

=== Disciplinary ===
- Most yellow cards in a season: 11
  - Steve Pantelidis (for Gold Coast United, 2009–10)
  - Wayne Srhoj (for Melbourne Heart, 2010–11)
  - Dimas (for Western Sydney Wanderers, 2015–16)
  - Joshua Brillante (for Sydney FC, 2016–17)
  - Alex Rufer (for Wellington Phoenix, 2018–19)
- Most red cards in a season: 3
  - Besart Berisha (for Brisbane Roar, 2013–14)
  - Nigel Boogaard (for Newcastle Jets, 2015–16)
  - Harrison Delbridge (for Melbourne City, 2019–20)
- Most yellow cards in total: 85, Andrew Durante
- Most red cards in total: 10, Nigel Boogaard
- Earliest red card: 57 seconds, Ante Covic for Melbourne Victory against Brisbane Roar, 5 November 2011
- Quickest red card (substitute): 9 seconds from restart of play to red card offence, Ruben Zadkovich for Perth Glory. Play restarted at 60:33 after his substitution took place following a Perth goal, his red card offence was a foul on Vince Lia at 60:42.
- Most red cards for a single team in one season: 10, Perth Glory (2010–11)
- Longest suspension: 9 months, with 3 months suspended, Danny Vukovic (2008). Originally 15 months, with 3 months suspended, the sentence was reduced and restructured after two appeals.
- Most appearances without a booking: 44
  - Romeo Castelen
  - Chris Naumoff
- Most appearances without a red card: 355, Alex Wilkinson

=== Other individual records ===
- Most A-League Men Premiership wins: 4, Michael Theo
- Most A-League Men Championship wins: 5, Michael Theo
- Most Golden Boot Awards: 5, Jamie Maclaren
- Most Joe Marston Medal Awards: 1, 19 players
- Most Johnny Warren Medal Awards: 2, Thomas Broich
- Most Young Footballer of the Year Awards: 2, Mathew Ryan, Jamie Maclaren
- Most Goal of the Year Awards: 2, Carlos Hernández

== Manager records ==
- Most A-League Premiership wins: 3, Graham Arnold (Central Coast Mariners) – 2011–12, (Sydney FC) – 2016–17, 2017–18
- Most A-League Championship wins: 2
  - Ernie Merrick (Melbourne Victory) – 2007, 2009
  - Ange Postecoglou (Brisbane Roar) – 2010, 2012
  - Graham Arnold (Central Coast Mariners) – 2013, (Sydney FC) – 2017
  - Kevin Muscat (Melbourne Victory) – 2015, 2018
  - Steve Corica (Sydney FC) – 2019, 2020
- Most yellow cards for a manager: 14, Ufuk Talay
- Most Coach of the Year Awards: 3,
  - Graham Arnold (2011–12, 2016–17, 2017–18)
  - Tony Popovic (2012–13, 2018–19, 2021–22)
- Most games managed: 308, Ernie Merrick
- Longest spell as manager: 151 games, Ernie Merrick (Melbourne Victory)
- Shortest-serving manager (excluding caretakers): 5 games, Ben Cahn (Brisbane Roar)
- Youngest manager: Des Buckingham, 31 years, 307 days (for Wellington Phoenix v Central Coast Mariners, 10 December 2016)

== All-time A-League Men table ==
The all-time A-League Men table is a cumulative record of all match results, points and goals of every team that has played in the A-League Men since its inception in 2005. The table that follows is accurate as of the end of the 2024–25 season. Teams in bold are part of the 2024–25 A-League Men. Numbers in bold are the record (highest either positive or negative) numbers in each column.

| Pos. | Club | Sea- sons | Pld | W | D | L | GF | GA | GD | Pts | PPG | 1st | 2nd | 3rd | 4th | 5th | 6th | T6 | Debut | Best Pos. |
|---|---|---|---|---|---|---|---|---|---|---|---|---|---|---|---|---|---|---|---|---|
| 1 | **Sydney FC** | **20** | **514** | **235** | 125 | 154 | **833** | 649 | **+184** | **827** (Note: Sydney FC deducted 3 points for breaching the salary cap in 2006) | 1.61 | **4** | **4** | 1 | 2 | **4** | | **15** | 2005–06 | **1** |
| 2 | **Melbourne Victory** | **20** | **514** | 216 | **129** | 169 | 812 | 698 | +114 | 777 | 1.51 | 3 | 3 | **3** | 2 | 3 | 1 | **15** | 2005–06 | **1** |
| 3 | **Adelaide United** | **20** | **514** | 209 | 127 | 178 | 780 | 737 | +43 | 754 | 1.47 | 2 | 2 | **3** | **3** | 2 | 3 | **15** | 2005–06 | **1** |
| 4 | **Brisbane Roar** (Note: Includes statistics from the club under its former name, Queensland Roar) | **20** | **514** | 197 | 128 | 189 | 728 | 710 | +18 | 719 | 1.40 | 2 | 1 | **3** | **3** | 2 | 3 | 14 | 2005–06 | **1** |
| 5 | **Central Coast Mariners** | **20** | **514** | 182 | 125 | 207 | 717 | 778 | –61 | 671 | 1.31 | 3 | 3 | **3** | 1 | 1 | 1 | 12 | 2005–06 | **1** |
| 6 | **Perth Glory** | **20** | **514** | 172 | 121 | 221 | 731 | **825** | –94 | 637 | 1.24 | 1 | | 1 | | **4** | 2 | 8 | 2005–06 | **1** |
| 7 | **Wellington Phoenix** | 18 | 472 | 169 | 107 | 196 | 646 | 733 | –87 | 614 | 1.30 | | 1 | 1 | **3** | | **5** | 10 | 2007–08 | 2 |
| 8 | **Melbourne City** (Note: Includes statistics from the club under its former name, Melbourne Heart) | 15 | 403 | 172 | 97 | 134 | 675 | 549 | +126 | 613 | 1.52 | 3 | 2 | 1 | 2 | 2 | 2 | 12 | 2010–11 | **1** |
| 9 | **Newcastle Jets** | **20** | **514** | 162 | 123 | **229** | 658 | 796 | **–138** | 609 | 1.18 | | 2 | 1 | 1 | | 1 | 5 | 2005–06 | 2 |
| 10 | **Western Sydney Wanderers** | 13 | 346 | 128 | 93 | 125 | 518 | 499 | +19 | 477 | 1.38 | 1 | 2 | | 2 | | 1 | 6 | 2012–13 | **1** |
| 11 | **Western United** | 6 | 157 | 63 | 28 | 66 | 241 | 253 | –12 | 217 | 1.38 | | | 2 | | 1 | | 3 | 2019–20 | 3 |
| 12 | **Macarthur FC** | 5 | 131 | 47 | 31 | 53 | 197 | 224 | –27 | 172 | 1.31 | | | | | 1 | 1 | 2 | 2020–21 | 5 |
| 13 | Gold Coast United | 3 | 84 | 29 | 24 | 31 | 109 | 109 | 0 | 111 | 1.32 | | | 1 | 1 | | | 2 | 2009–10 | 3 |
| 14 | **Auckland FC** | **1** | **26** | 15 | 8 | **3** | 49 | **27** | +22 | 53 | **2.04** | 1 | | | | | | 1 | 2024–25 | **1** |
| 15 | North Queensland Fury | 2 | 57 | 12 | 15 | 30 | 57 | 106 | –49 | 51 | 0.89 | | | | | | | | 2009–10 | 7 |
| 16 | New Zealand Knights | 2 | 42 | **6** | **7** | 29 | **28** | 86 | –58 | **25** | **0.60** | | | | | | | | 2005–06 | **8** |

== See also ==
- List of A-League Men honours
- List of A-League Men hat-tricks
- Australian clubs in the AFC Champions League
- A-League Women records and statistics
