= Sebastian Ryall =

Australian soccer player

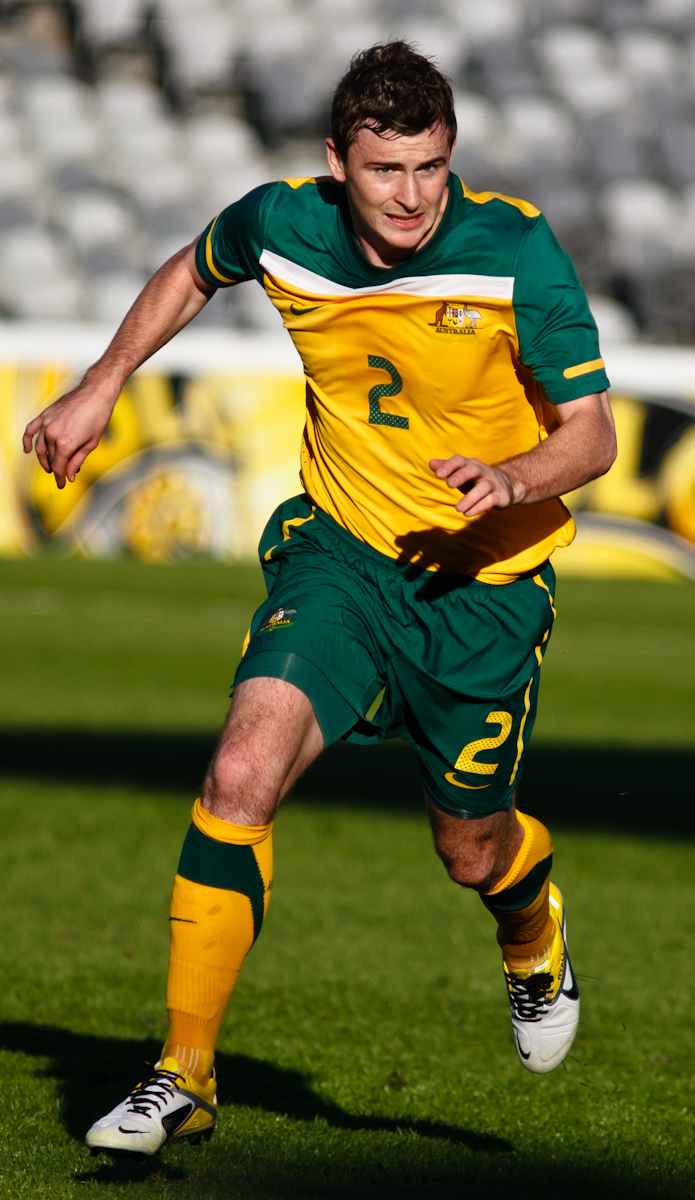
- Ryall playing for the Olyroos in 2011

Personal information
- Full name: Sebastian John Henry Ryall
- Date of birth: 18 July 1989 (age 37)
- Place of birth: Sydney, New South Wales, Australia
- Height: 1.80 m (5 ft 11 in)
- Positions: Centre-back; right-back

Youth career
- Northern Spirit
- 2005–2006: NSWIS
- 2006–2007: AIS

Senior career*
Years	Team	Apps	(Gls)
2007	AIS	24	(0)
2007–2009	Melbourne Victory	24	(0)
2009–2018	Sydney FC	164	(10)

International career
2006–2009	Australia U20	25	(4)
2007–2012	Australia U23	10	(1)
- * Club domestic league appearances and goals

Sebastian John Henry Ryall (born 18 July 1989) is an Australian former professional soccer player who played as a centre-back or right-back.

== Club career ==
=== Melbourne Victory ===
Ryall played junior football for West Pymble Football Club and Northern Spirit FC in Sydney. Ryall later played for the AIS in the Victorian Premier League before signing for Melbourne Victory on a two-year contract in August 2007.

He made his first appearance for the club in their Round three match against Adelaide United and played in their Grand Final win over Adelaide in March 2009. In April 2009 he signed with Sydney FC for the A-League 2009–10 campaign.

=== Sydney FC ===
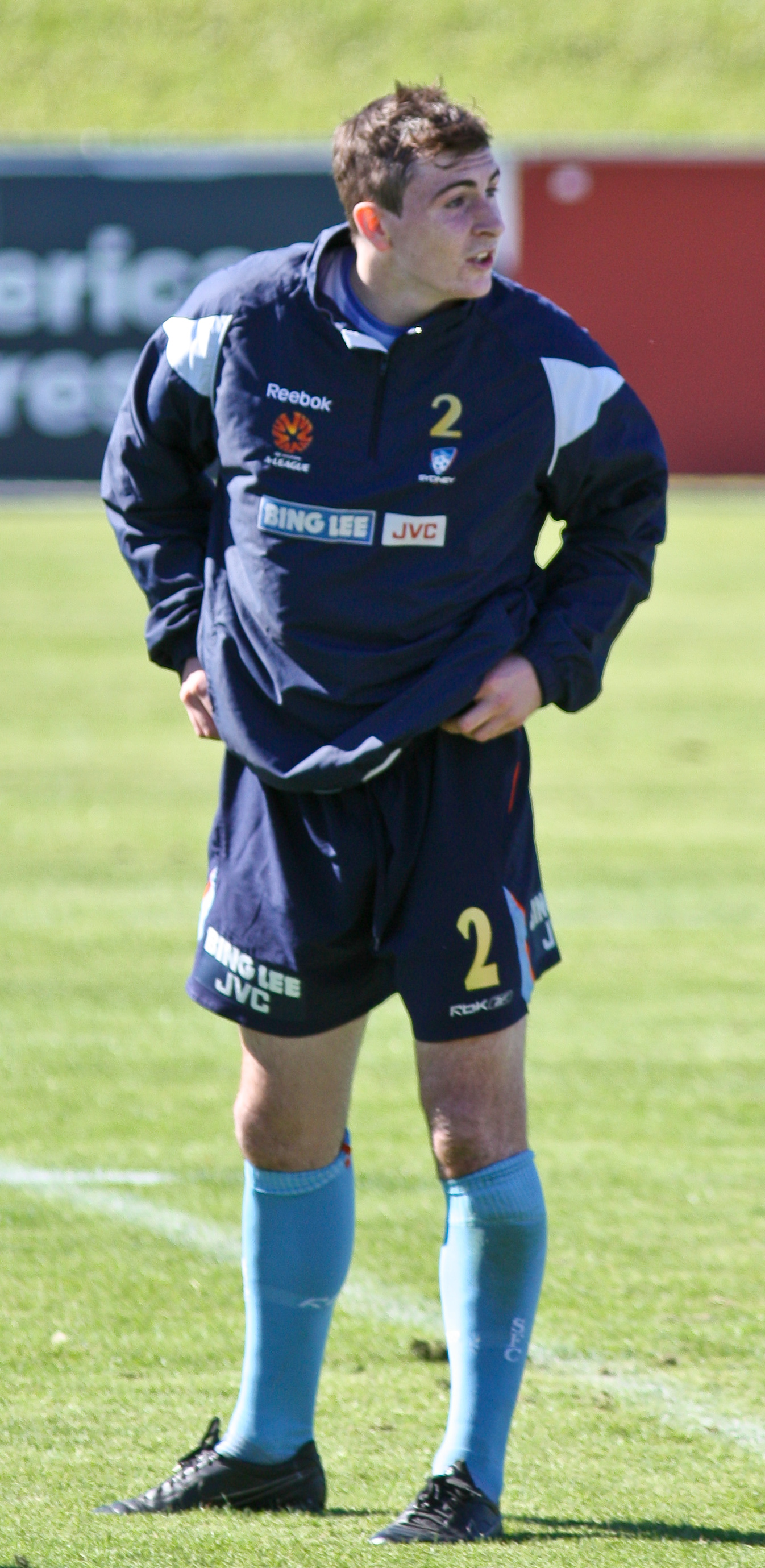
Ryall training with Sydney FC

He made his first start for Sydney FC after coming back from his suspension in their Round 5, 2–1 loss to Gold Coast United.

He re-signed with Sydney FC for a further two seasons, on 24 August 2010.

Ryall scored his first goal for Sydney FC in the 2011–12 A-League season with a dramatic equaliser in the 90th minute, against his former team Melbourne Victory on 26 January. Ryall's strike came less than a minute after being brought on as a substitute . Ryall continued to score important goals for Sydney against his former club, including three goals in four appearances against the Victory during the 2013–14 A-League season with goals in the Round 5, 3–2 win at Allianz Stadium, Round 16, 5–0 win on Australia Day at Etihad Stadium in Melbourne, and again in the 1–2 2013–14 Elimination Final loss against the Victory at Etihad.

Controversy surrounded Ryall during the 2014–15 A-League Round 17 clash vs the Melbourne Victory when he was awarded a penalty following a possession contest with Victory player Gui Finkler. Initial replays appeared to show Ryall simulating contact with Finkler's leg. At the time, Melbourne Victory were leading 2–1, and the resulting conversion of the penalty kick allowed Sydney FC to get back into the game. The decision to award the penalty was heavily criticized by media commentators, managers, players, and pundits alike, with former player and Fox Sports commentator Mark Bosnich reacting angrily to the decision. Melbourne Victory player Kosta Barbarouses claimed he had "lost respect" for Ryall over the incident. Ryall also drew criticism from Sydney FC coach Graham Arnold, and CEO of the club Tony Pignata over his reaction following the awarding of the penalty where he appeared to clip Finkler over his head. On 19 February, Ryall was cleared of diving by the FFA Match Review Panel, with the board taking two hours to clear him following reviewing slowed down footage, which showed Ryall's leg being clipped by Finkler.

Ryall signed a two-year contract extension along with teammate Rhyan Grant midway through the 2014–15 A-League season, which will keep him at the club until the end of 2017.

During Round 12 in a match against the Central Coast Mariners of the 2015–16 season, Ryall was handed the captain's armband after regular skipper Alex Brosque limped off with a recurring hamstring injury and both vice-captains Jacques Faty and Shane Smeltz starting on the bench. Ryall proceeded to earn multiple best on ground awards during his stint as skipper.

Ryall scored his first A-League goal in three years on 25 November, heading a free-kick from Jordy Buijs home during Sydney's 3–1 win over Brisbane Roar.

On 17 January 2018, Ryall had his contract terminated with Sydney FC at his request in order to seek a break from football, stating that he had grown "disillusioned" and grown out of favour with the sport. Ryall never returned to professional football.

== International career ==
Throughout 2007 and 2008 Ryall was the captain of the Australian U-20 side. Due to a suspension, Sebastian missed out on selection for the 2009 FIFA U-20 World Cup due to his criminal charges, where which he would have been assured a spot in the team. After a lengthy absence from Australia's national teams, in September 2010 he was called up to the Australian under-23 side by coach Aurelio Vidmar for a Four Nations Tournament held in Vietnam.

== Court case ==
Ryall was charged, on 15 May 2009, with engaging in a sexual act with a 13-year-old girl. The alleged incident happened in January 2008, while he was playing with Melbourne Victory. He was suspended from participation in football matches in Australia, until 3 September as well as being stood down from the national youth team by Football Federation Australia Chief Executive Officer Ben Buckley for bringing the game into disrepute. On Monday 25 January 2010, he was committed to stand trial on the case after his committal hearing at Sydney's Downing Centre Local Court On 15 May 2010, the Director of Public Prosecutions dropped the charges against Ryall After a submission by Ryall's legal team that at the time of the alleged incident, he believed the girl to be over the legal age of 16 and that they were "just kissing"

== Career statistics ==
As of 19 December 2018

Appearances and goals by club, season and competition
Club	Season	League (Note: A-League statistics include final series matches)			Cup (Note: Includes the FFA Cup only)		Continental (Note: Appearance(s) in AFC Champions League)		Other (Note: Includes the A-League Pre-Season Challenge Cup)		Total	
Club	Season	Division	Apps	Goals	Apps	Goals	Apps	Goals	Apps	Goals	Apps	Goals
Australian Institute of Sport	2007	Victorian Premier League	24	0	—		—		—		24	0
Melbourne Victory	2007–08	A-League	14	0	—		6	0	—		20	0
Melbourne Victory	2008–09	A-League	10	0	—		—		4	0	14	0
Melbourne Victory	Total		24	0	—		6	0	4	0	34	0
Sydney FC	2009–10	A-League	18	0	—		—		—		18	0
Sydney FC	2010–11	A-League	28	0	—		3	0	—		31	0
Sydney FC	2011–12	A-League	15	1	—		—		—		15	1
Sydney FC	2012–13	A-League	25	3	—		—		—		25	3
Sydney FC	2013–14	A-League	21	5	—		—		—		21	5
Sydney FC	2014–15	A-League	24	0	3	0	—		—		27	0
Sydney FC	2015–16	A-League	23	0	2	0	5	0	—		27	0
Sydney FC	2016–17	A-League	10	0	5	1	—		—		15	1
Sydney FC	2017–18	A-League	4	1	3	1	—		—		7	2
Sydney FC	Total		168	10	13	2	8	0	—		189	12
Career Total			216	10	13	2	14	0	4	0	247	11

== Honours ==
Melbourne Victory

- A-League Championship: 2008–09
- A-League Premiership: 2008–09
- A-League Pre-Season Challenge Cup: 2008

Sydney FC

- A-League Championship: 2009–10, 2016–17
- A-League Premiership: 2009–10, 2016–17
- FFA Cup: 2017

Australia U19

- AFF U-19 Youth Championship: 2008
