= Billy Celeski =

Macedonian-born Australian soccer player

Personal information
- Full name: Blagoja Celeski
- Date of birth: 14 July 1985 (age 41)
- Place of birth: Ohrid, SR Macedonia, SFR Yugoslavia
- Height: 1.75 m (5 ft 9 in)
- Position: Midfielder

Youth career
- Preston Lions
- Bullen Zebras
- 2001: VIS
- 2002–2003: AIS

Senior career*
Years	Team	Apps	(Gls)
2004–2005	Bullen Zebras	16	(2)
2005–2006	Perth Glory	18	(0)
2006–2007	Bullen Zebras	23	(5)
2007–2008	Perth Glory	14	(4)
2008–2013	Melbourne Victory	91	(2)
2013–2014	Al-Shaab	10	(0)
2014	Liaoning Whowin	6	(0)
2014–2015	Newcastle Jets	4	(0)
2016	Ventforet Kofu	13	(1)
Total		195	(14)

International career
2004–2005	Australia U-20	14	(0)
2006–2007	Australia U-23	13	(0)
2009	Australia	1	(0)

Managerial career
- 2024–: St Albans Dinamo (assistant coach)
- * Club domestic league appearances and goals

Blagoja "Billy" Celeski (born 14 July 1985) is a retired footballer. He last played as a midfielder for Ventforet Kofu in the J1 League in 2016. Born in Yugoslavia, he played for the Australia national team.

== Club career ==
Celeski signed for Perth Glory for the 2005–06 A-League season from Bullen Zebras playing 18 times and won the club's media award, but was released at the end of the season. Celeski graduated from the Victorian Institute of Sport and Australian Institute of Sport. In March 2007 Celeski was signed by Perth Glory again. A notable performance, with Perth Glory, in the A-League occurred on Saturday, 15 December 2007 – where Celeski scored a hat-trick in Perth Glory's 4–2 win over Sydney FC at the Sydney Football Stadium.

Afterwards Celeski signed for Melbourne Victory at the end of the 2007–08 season in a one-year deal, post-mutual termination of his Perth Glory contract, primarily to bolster the squad for the AFC Champions League. Celeski scored his first goal for his new club in their 3–2 win over Adelaide United on 31 October 2008. Celeski signed a new 2-year contract with Melbourne Victory on 23 December 2008.

Celeski went on to play a role in the Melbourne team, performing an important role in their title-winning campaign, while also not missing a league match until late 2009. This was to be stopped on 3 September of that year however, when he suffered a season ending anterior cruciate ligament injury, in the opening of a match against Newcastle Jets.

On 20 July 2013, Celeski represented the A-League All Stars in the inaugural A-League All Stars Game against Manchester United, a match in which the A-League All Stars were thrashed 5–1, courtesy of goals from Danny Welbeck, Jesse Lingard and Robin van Persie. Just 4 days later, on 24 July 2013, he represented Melbourne Victory against Liverpool, a match in which the Victory lost 2–0, courtesy of goals from Steven Gerrard and an own-goal from Victory captain Adrian Leijer. He was the only Victory player to have played in both of those exhibition matches.

On 30 July 2013, just a few days after representing the A-League All Stars against Manchester United and representing Melbourne Victory against Liverpool, Billy Celeski transferred from Melbourne Victory to UAE Pro-League club Al-Shaab.

On 24 February 2014, Celeski transferred to Chinese Super League side Liaoning Whowin. On 29 May 2014, he was released along with Artyom Filiposyan.

On 6 August 2014, Celeski signed with the Newcastle Jets. He was reportedly sacked by Jets owner Nathan Tinkler, following a player revolt midway through the season.

On 3 February 2016, Celeski joined J1 League club Ventforet Kofu.

== International career ==
Celeski made his first senior international debut for the Socceroos on 28 January 2009 in an AFC Asian Cup qualifying match versus Indonesia, appearing as a substitute for Tom Pondeljak. He was also a member of the unsuccessful Olyroos squad that took part in the 2008 Beijing Olympics.

== Personal life ==
Celeski was born in Ohrid, SR Macedonia, and moved to Melbourne, Australia as a child.

== Career statistics ==
=== Club ===
Appearances and goals by club, season and competition
Club	Season	League			National cup (Note: Includes Emperor's Cup)		League cup (Note: Includes A-League Pre-Season Challenge Cup, UAE League Cup, J.League Cup)		Continental		Other		Total	
Club	Season	Division	Apps	Goals	Apps	Goals	Apps	Goals	Apps	Goals	Apps	Goals	Apps	Goals
Bulleen Zebras	2004	Victorian Premier League	13	2	—		—		—		2 (Note: Appearances in the Dockerty Cup)	1	15	3
Bulleen Zebras	2005	Victorian Premier League	3	0	—		—		—		—		3	0
Bulleen Zebras	Total		16	2	0	0	0	0	0	0	2	1	18	2
Perth Glory	2005–06	A-League	18	0	—		5	0	—		1 (Note: Appearance in the 2005 Australian Club World Championship Qualifying Tournament)	0	24	0
Bulleen Zebras	2006	Victorian Premier League	11	1	—		—		—		—		11	1
Bulleen Zebras	2007	Victorian Premier League	12	4	—		—		—		—		12	4
Bulleen Zebras	Total		23	5	0	0	0	0	0	0	0	0	23	5
Perth Glory	2007–08	A-League	14	4	—		3	0	—		—		17	7
Melbourne Victory	2007–08	A-League	—		—		—		6 (Note: Appearances in AFC Champions League)	0	—		6	0
Melbourne Victory	2008–09	A-League	24	1	—		0	0	—		—		24	1
Melbourne Victory	2009–10	A-League	5	0	—		—		0	0	—		5	0
Melbourne Victory	2010–11	A-League	25	1	—		—		4	0	—		29	1
Melbourne Victory	2011–12	A-League	10	0	—		—		—		—		10	0
Melbourne Victory	2012–13	A-League	27	0	—		—		—		—		27	0
Melbourne Victory	Total		91	2	0	0	0	0	10	0	0	0	101	2
Al-Shaab	2013–14	UAE Pro League	10	0	0	0	3	0	—		—		13	0
Liaoning Whowin	2014	Chinese Super League	6	0	—		—		—		—		6	0
Newcastle Jets	2014–15	A-League	4	0	—		—		—		—		4	0
Ventforet Kofu	2016	J1 League	13	1	1	0	4	1	—		—		18	2
Total			195	14	1	0	15	1	10	0	3	0	224	15

== Honours ==
=== Club ===
Melbourne Victory:

- A-League Championship: 2008–09
- A-League Premiership: 2008–09

=== Individual ===
- A-League All Star: 2013
