= Danny Allsopp =

Australian soccer player (born 1978)

- Allsopp as a Melbourne Victory player in 2009

Personal information
- Full name: Daniel Allsopp
- Date of birth: 10 August 1978 (age 48)
- Place of birth: Melbourne, Australia
- Height: 1.85 m (6 ft 1 in)
- Position: Forward

Youth career
- 1991–1993: Knox City
- 1994: Monbulk Rangers
- 1995: Croydon City Arrows

Senior career*
Years	Team	Apps	(Gls)
1995–1997	South Melbourne	20	(2)
1997–1998	Carlton SC	15	(3)
1998	Port Melbourne Sharks	14	(9)
1998–2000	Manchester City	29	(4)
1999	→ Notts County (loan)	3	(1)
1999	→ Wrexham (loan)	3	(4)
2000	→ Bristol Rovers (loan)	6	(0)
2000–2003	Notts County	102	(39)
2003–2005	Hull City	64	(22)
2005–2009	Melbourne Victory	89	(36)
2009–2010	Al-Rayyan	12	(6)
2010	D.C. United	23	(5)
2011–2012	Melbourne Victory	29	(6)
2013	Launceston City	1	(0)
2013–2014	Croydon City Arrows	35	(23)
2014	Launceston City	1	(3)
Total		437	(163)

International career
1994–1995	Australia U-17	11	(10)
1996–1997	Australia U-20	6	(7)
1997–2000	Australia U-23	8	(8)
2007–2009	Australia	3	(0)
- * Club domestic league appearances and goals

Daniel Lee Allsopp (born 10 August 1978) is an Australian former professional soccer player who played as a forward.

As a player, he notably played for Manchester City for several seasons and was part of their team that earned promotion back to the Premier League in 2000, He also spending time on loan with Notts County, Wrexham and Bristol Rovers. He also played in England for Hull City where he was a prolific goal scorer and would play in Major League Soccer for D.C. United. He spent the majority of his career in the A-League with South Melbourne and Melbourne Victory, also playing professionally for Carlton SC, Port Melbourne Sharks, Al-Rayyan, Launceston City and Croydon City Arrows

He was a full international for the Australia national team, and is Melbourne Victory's second highest, and the A-League's seventh highest all-time goal scorer, behind Archie Thompson, Shane Smeltz, Besart Berisha, Jamie Maclaren, Sergio van Dijk, Mark Bridge and Carlos Hernandez.

== Club career ==
Allsopp started his senior football career with Monbulk Rangers in 1994 as a 16-year-old, competing in the Victorian Provisional League Division 1. The following year he joined Croydon City in the Victorian State League Division 1 competition before joining then-NSL club South Melbourne in 1995. Allsopp holds the distinction for being the first South Melbourne player to score at Lakeside Stadium following South Melbourne's move from their traditional ground of Middle Park. As a youngster, Allsopp impressed under coach Frank Arok but could not break into new coach Ange Postecoglou's side ahead of internationals such as Vaughan Coveny, Paul Trimboli and Michael Curcjia.

After two seasons with South, Allsopp made the move across town to Carlton S.C. for the 1997 NSL season.

Allsopp spent the 1998 Victorian Premier League season with Port Melbourne Sharks then moved to England to trial for Second Division club Manchester City, and after scoring in City's first friendly match against Newquay as well as some reserve team matches, he was signed for the club for the 1998–99 season. Allsopp's four goals in 25 games saw Manchester City promoted to the First Division, but he struggled to find a regular place in the team as the team in the 1999–2000 season, and was loaned out to Notts County.

He was loaned to Wrexham in early 2000, and scored four goals in just three league matches by end of the 1999–2000 season. The following season, he went on loan to Bristol Rovers, where he failed to score a goal in his four league appearances. Allsopp returned on loan to Notts County, and scored four goals in three matches before being bought for £300,000 by the club. In a three-season career, he scored 50 goals in 111 appearances (in all matches) before signing with Hull City for 2003–04. The move provided more success for Allsopp, as he scored 15 goals in his first season and seven in 2004–05 as a regular in the line-up.

Allsopp negotiated an early release from Hull, and decided to return to Australia to play for new club Melbourne Victory under Ernie Merrick, who had coached Allsopp during his time at the VIS. Despite making 20 starts in the 2005–06 season, Allsopp was not nearly as prolific as at his previous clubs, and only managed three goals for the year. The season featured Allsopp's 250th match in all league competitions.

The 2006–07 season saw a remarkable turnaround in Allsopp's scoring record at Melbourne. He finished the season as the league Golden Boot winner as highest scorer in the home and away fixtures. His tally of 11 made him the first A-League player to score a double figure tally and was one goal more than second place, teammate Archie Thompson. His 35 shots on target was also the equal highest with Newcastle Jets midfielder Nick Carle.

During the 2009 – 2010, A-League season it was confirmed that Allsopp had signed with Qatari side, Al-Rayyan Sports Club, for an undisclosed fee. He had less than a year left on his contract with Victory.

On 22 September 2009, Allsopp made his debut for Al-Rayyan against Al-Kharatiyat, providing an assist for Amara Diane's goal.

Allsopp joined Major League Soccer club D.C. United on 18 January 2010. Allsopp and D.C. United mutually agreed to terminate his contract after just one season with the club. On 24 December 2010, Allsopp rejoined with his teammates at the Melbourne Victory, in a contract that will keep him there until the end of the 2012–13 season.

On 18 October 2012, he announced his retirement from professional football.

In 2013, Allsopp returned to play for his boyhood club, Croydon City Arrows. 2014 was a successful year for both Croydon & Allsopp, with the club winning the Victorian State League 4 East competition & promotion to State League 3 and Allsopp winning both the league Best & Fairest and Golden Boot Awards.

In 2013, Allsopp signed as a guest player for Launceston City FC. He featured in the round 15 National Premier Leagues Tasmania fixture between Launceston City FC and local rivals Northern Rangers FC. The match finished in a 6–0 win to Northern Rangers FC, with Allsopp picking up a yellow card for a reckless challenge.

In 2014 Allsopp again featured for the Tasmanian State League club as a guest player, in a round 5 National Premier Leagues Tasmania match against City's sister club Hobart Zebras FC. The game finished in a 4–2 win for City, with Allsopp scoring a hat-trick. This was a history making result for City and saw the end of a 25-game losing streak, with the club previously not winning a single league fixture since the new statewide league inception in 2013.

== International career ==
In 1995, he made his name in the under-17 World Championship, where he was tied top scorer with five goals, including one in Australia's 3 – 1 loss to eventual runners-up Brazil. His performance opened the door for his entrance into the Australian National Soccer League, signing with South Melbourne. He stayed with the club until 1997, having scored two goals in his 20 appearances.

Allsopp represented Australia again, this time at under-20 level in the 1997 FIFA World Youth Championship in Malaysia, with Australia making it through to the second round before being knocked out by Japan. On his return he was signed for Carlton SC, but was loaned out to VPL club Port Melbourne Sharks.

Meanwhile, Allsopp had become a regular member of Australia's under-23 national team (the "Olyroos") in 1999, and played three matches for one goal in 2000, but was not selected in the squad for the 2000 Summer Olympics.

Allsopp finally earned his first call-up to the Australia senior squad for a friendly match against Uruguay in June 2007 and came on as a 78th-minute substitute in the 2–1 defeat by the South Americans. On 23 May he got his second international appearance for Australia when he came on as a substitute for James Troisi in a friendly against Ghana.

National coach Pim Verbeek described Allsopp's performance against Indonesia in February 2009 as "absolutely hopeless", although he later added that "in the last games (for Melbourne) I have seen they were very good, so maybe it was because of Indonesia or the trip".

== Personal life ==
Allsopp was born in Melbourne, Victoria and is married with two sons.

His brother Nick was a champion rollerskater, and nephew Hayden won Football Victoria East 15A with Mooroolbark SC.

He now works for a packaging firm as an Account Manager.

== Career statistics ==
As of 7 May 2010

Appearances and goals by club, season and competition
Club	Season	League			Cup		Continental		Total	
Club	Season	Division	Apps	Goals	Apps	Goals	Apps	Goals	Apps	Goals
South Melbourne	1995–96	National Soccer League	3	0					3	0
South Melbourne	1995–96	National Soccer League	17	2					17	2
South Melbourne	Total		20	2					20	2
Carlton SC	1997–98	National Soccer League	15	3					15	3
Port Melbourne Sharks	1997–98	National Soccer League	14	9					14	9
Manchester City	1998–99	Football League One	25	4	4	2			29	6
Manchester City	1999–2000	Football League One	4	0	4	0			8	0
Manchester City	2000–01	Football League One	1	0					1	0
Manchester City	Total		30	4	8	2			38	6
Notts County (loan)	1999–00	Football League One	3	1					3	1
Wrexham FC (loan)	1998–99	Football League One	3	4					3	4
Bristol Rovers (loan)	2000–01	Football League One	6	0					6	0
Notts County	2000–01	Football League One	29	13	4	0			33	13
Notts County	2001–02	Football League One	43	19	7	9			50	28
Notts County	2002–03	Football League One	33	10	3	2			36	12
Notts County	Total		102	39	13	11			115	50
Hull City	2003–04	Football League Two	36	15	1				37	15
Hull City	2004–05	Football League One	28	7	2	0			30	7
Hull City	Total		64	22	3	0			67	22
Melbourne Victory	2005–06	A-League	20	3	3	2			23	5
Melbourne Victory	2006–07	A-League	23	12	4	2			27	14
Melbourne Victory	2007–08	A-League	18	7	1	0			19	7
Melbourne Victory	2008–09	A-League	24	13	4	3	6	3	34	19
Melbourne Victory	2009–10	A-League	4	1					4	1
Melbourne Victory	Total		89	36	12	7	6	3	107	46
Al-Rayyan	2009–10	Qatar Stars League	12	6	3	2			15	8
D.C. United	2010	Major League Soccer	22	5	6	4			28	9
Melbourne Victory	2010–11	A-League	9	5					9	5
Career total			389	136	45	26	6	3	438	165

== Honours ==
South Melbourne

- Dockerty Cup: 1995
- NSL Cup: 1995–96

Melbourne Victory

- A-League Championship: 2006–07, 2008–09
- A-League Premiership: 2006–07, 2008–09

Individual

- FIFA U-17 World Cup Golden Boot: 1995
- A-League Golden Boot: 2006–07
- Melbourne Victory Victory Medal: 2006-2007
- Melbourne Victory Player's Player of the Year: 2006–07, 2008–09
