= Evan Berger =

Australian soccer player (born 1987)

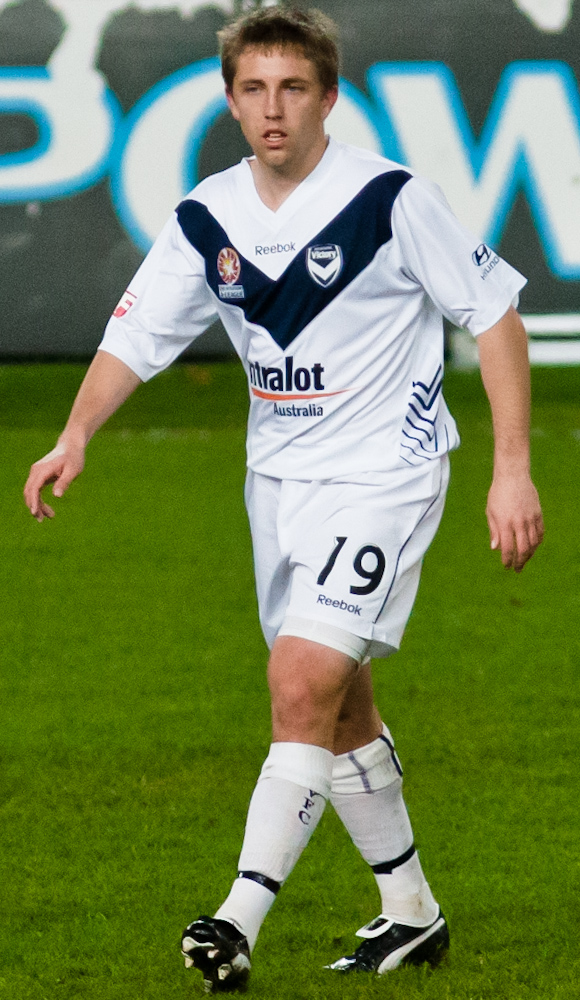

Personal information
- Full name: Evan James Berger
- Date of birth: 16 August 1987 (age 39)
- Place of birth: Sydney, Australia
- Height: 1.67 m (5 ft 6 in)
- Positions: Left back; left winger

Youth career
- Macarthur Rams
- 2004: Parramatta Eagles
- 2004–2005: AIS

Senior career*
Years	Team	Apps	(Gls)
2005–2007	Marconi Stallions	40	(6)
2007–2011	Melbourne Victory	43	(0)
2011–2013	Perth Glory	6	(0)
2013	Marconi Stallions	6	(0)

International career^{‡}
2005–2006	Australia U-20	16	(2)
- * Club domestic league appearances and goals as of 13 January 2015 ‡ National team caps and goals as of 17:30, 12 November 2010 (UTC)

Evan James Berger (born 16 August 1987) is an Australian former soccer player who played as a defender and midfielder. Throughout his career, he played for NSW Premier League club Marconi Stallions and A-League Men clubs Melbourne Victory and Perth Glory, and was capped 16 times for the Australia under-20 national team.

== Club career ==
=== Early career ===
He has been involved in football since he was young, playing for the Burragorang District soccer club.

=== Melbourne Victory ===
Berger's club career began at Melbourne Victory FC after playing for Burragorang District Soccer Club, the Macarthur Rams, Parramatta Eagles, Australian Institute of Sport, Young Socceroos and the Marconi Stallions. In May 2007 he signed to Melbourne Victory, who offered him a two-year contract after only two training sessions with the club, as each A-League team was required three Under-20 signings. He completed the 2007 New South Wales Premier League season with Marconi before joining Melbourne in preparation to represent the team in the A-League 2007–08 season.

=== Perth Glory ===
For the 2011–12 A-League season he signed a two-year contract with the Perth Glory after struggling to get regular playing time at Melbourne Victory. Berger, along with teammates Dean Heffernan, Nick Ward and Lewis Italiano were released by the Glory at the end of the 2012–13 A-League season.

== Retirement ==
In October 2013 Berger announced his retirement from professional football due to ongoing hamstring problems.

In 2017, Berger participated in Pennant Golf as a member of Cheltenham Golf Club's Pennant Team. Berger also won the Club Championship in 2017.

== International career ==
Berger obtained a one-year scholarship at the Australian Institute of Sport in Canberra after impressing Australian under-20 selectors in 2005, who subsequently also offered him a place on the Australia national under-20 football team, or the Young Socceroos Squad. With the Young Socceroos he has toured Sri Lanka, Argentina, Malaysia, India and Chile, scoring his first international goal against the Vietnam national football team. He was one of twenty-three nominees for an informal Australia Day Award awarded by his local council, Wollondilly Shire Council, on the outskirts of Sydney, nominated for his international representation of Australia and also as a member of the New South Wales Combined High Schools and Australian Schoolboys teams.

== A-League career statistics ==
(Correct as of 19 February 2012)

Club	Season	League			Finals			Asia			Total		
Club	Season	Apps	Goals	Assists	Apps	Goals	Assists	Apps	Goals	Assists	Apps	Goals	Assists
Melbourne Victory	2007–08	5	0	0	-	-	-	6	0	0	11	0	0
Melbourne Victory	2008–09	13	0	0	2	0	0	-	-	-	15	0	0
Melbourne Victory	2009–10	9	0	0	3	0	0	6	0	0	18	0	0
Melbourne Victory	2010–11	11	0	0	-	-	-	-	-	-	11	0	0
Perth Glory	2011–12	6	0	0	-	-	-	-	-	-	6	0	0
Total		44	0	0	5	0	0	12	-	-	61	0	0

== Honours ==
With Melbourne Victory:

- A-League Championship: 2008–09
- A-League Premiership: 2008–09
- A-League Pre-Season Challenge Cup: 2008
