= UTC+11:30 =

Former time zone

- Time zone
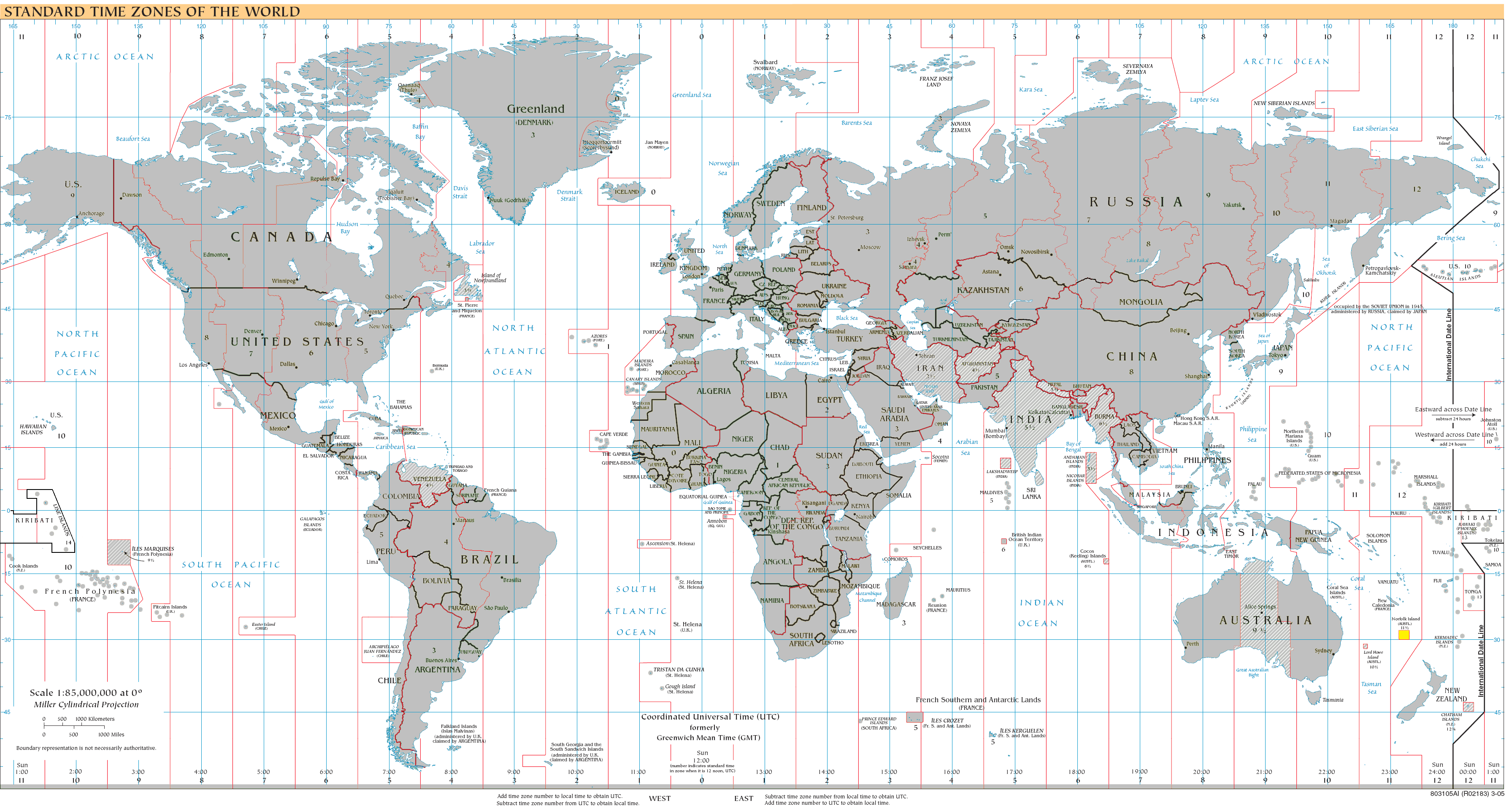
- World map with the time zone highlighted

UTC offset
- UTC: UTC+11:30

Current time
- 11:21, 13 January 2026 UTC+11:30 [refresh]

Central meridian
- 172.5 degrees E

Date-time group
- L*

UTC+11:30 is an identifier for a time offset from UTC of +11:30. It is no longer in use as of 2015.

== History ==
This time zone was used as standard time in New Zealand and Norfolk Island.

On November 2, 1868, New Zealand officially adopted a standard time to be observed nationally, and was perhaps the first country to do so. It was based on the longitude 172° 30' East of Greenwich, that was 11 hours 30 minutes ahead of Greenwich Mean Time. This standard was known as New Zealand Mean Time (NZMT). New Zealand changed from NZMT to New Zealand Standard Time (NZST) as UTC+12:00 in 1946 (after using this time zone as a daylight saving time since 1928, including permanent daylight saving from 1941). It was officially changed to 12 hours in advance of UTC in 1946.

Norfolk Island's standard time (NFT) was on UTC+11:30 until 4 October 2015, when it was changed to UTC+11:00.

== See also ==
- Time in Australia
- Time in New Zealand
