= Ernie Merrick =

Football coach

Ernie Merrick OAM
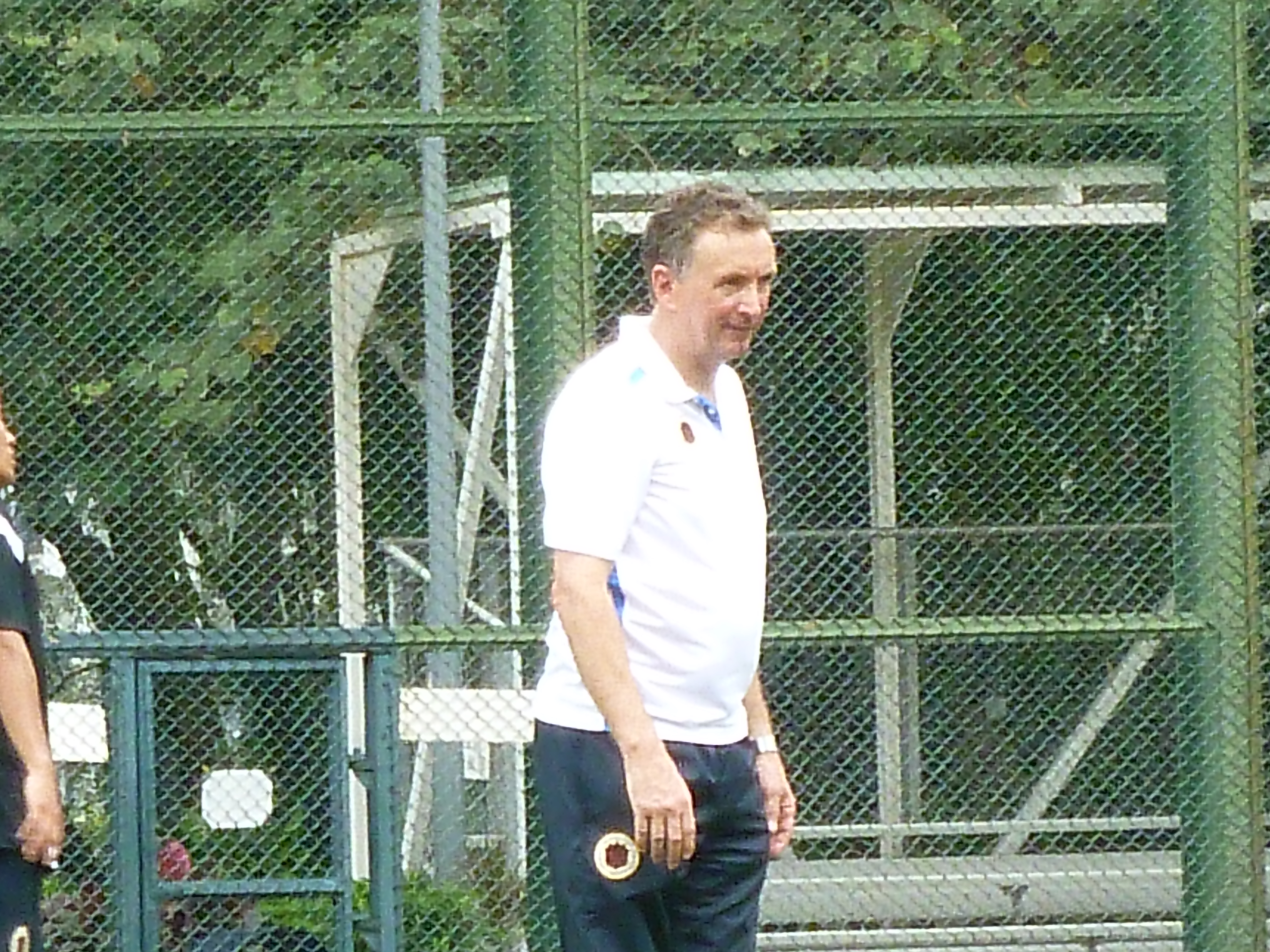

Personal information
- Full name: Ernest Merrick
- Date of birth: 15 January 1953 (age 73)
- Place of birth: Edinburgh, Scotland
- Position: Defender

Youth career
- Shettleston

Senior career*
Years	Team	Apps	(Gls)
1975–1978	Frankston City		
1979–1984	Doveton		

Managerial career
- 1979–1984: Doveton (Asst.)
- 1986: Frankston Pines (Asst.)
- 1987–1988: Preston Lions FC
- 1989–1991: Sunshine George Cross
- 1992–2004: VIS
- 2005–2011: Melbourne Victory
- 2011–2012: Hong Kong
- 2013–2016: Wellington Phoenix
- 2017–2020: Newcastle Jets
- * Club domestic league appearances and goals

Ernest Merrick OAM (born 15 January 1953) is a Scottish-Australian coach, who last managed A-League soccer club Newcastle Jets. He was released on 6 January 2020. He was the former head coach of the Hong Kong national football team and A-League clubs Melbourne Victory and Wellington Phoenix. He currently serves as the chief football officer for Football Australia.

Merrick holds the A-League Men records for most games managed (308) and most games won (128), and is the only person to date to have managed over 300 games.

== Coaching career ==
=== Melbourne Victory ===
In his first season at Melbourne Victory in 2005/06, the club failed to live up to its championship aspirations. With Socceroos Archie Thompson and Kevin Muscat in the squad, and the experience of 2 European internationals in Geoffrey Claeys and Richard Kitzbichler, expectations from the Melbourne fans were high. But they were left disappointed when the club finished the season 7th out of the 8 teams. After a promising start which saw them 1st after round 8, when they beat eventual champions Sydney FC 5–0, the team then won only 3 of the last 13 games.

During the second season, The Victory won the 2006–07 A-League Premiership, 12 points clear of second placed Adelaide United. Melbourne Victory faced Adelaide United in the A-League Grand Final at the Telstra Dome on 18 February, winning the match 6–0 with Archie Thompson scoring an incredible five goals.

The 2007–2008 season was a return to the disappointment of Merrick's first year in charge however, with the team finishing outside the Top 4 spots and thus failing to progress to the Finals Series.

Melbourne Victory finished second in the group phase of the 2008 Asian Champions League. Gamba Osaka won the group and went on to win the Asian Champions League.

In the 2008–2009 season, Melbourne Victory won the treble; the Pre-Season Cup, the Premiership and the Grand Final. In the Grand Final, Melbourne Victory defeated Adelaide United 1–0 to secure their second championship under Ernie Merrick's coaching.

During the 2009–2010 season, Melbourne Victory, despite severe season-ending knee injuries to key players, Billy Celeski, Matthew Kemp and star striker Archie Thompson once again reached the Grand Final. Sydney FC took out the title after extra time on penalties. Kevin Muscat and Marvin Angulo missed their penalty kicks, allowing Sydney to take out the championship.

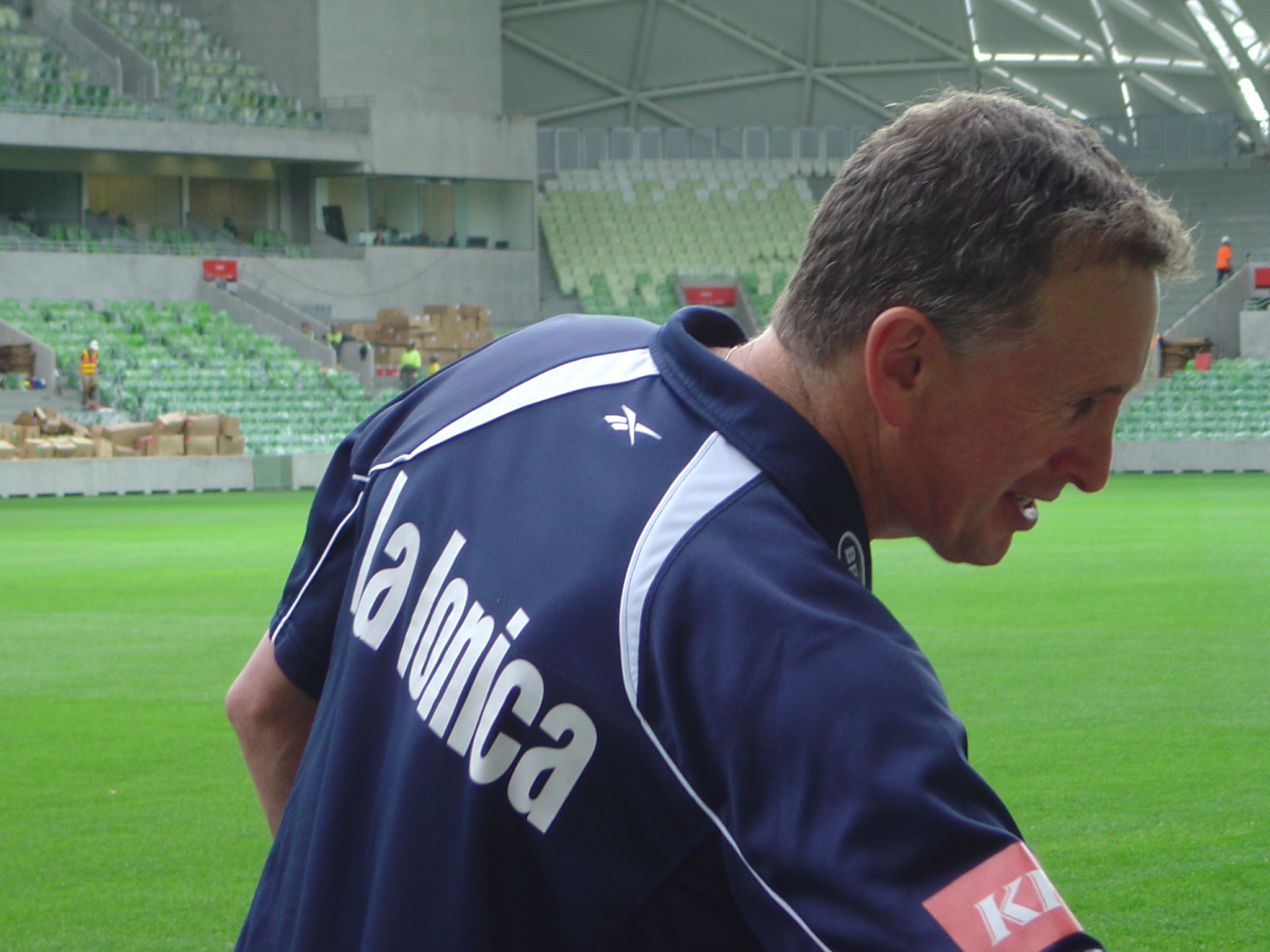
Merrick in 2010

On 12 March 2011, Ernie Merrick was sacked from his post at Melbourne Victory. The board of Melbourne Victory stated that they were unhappy with Victory's season and the 5–1 defeat by Gamba Osaka in Japan in the opening match of the Asian Champions League. Anthony Di Pietro, chairman of Melbourne Victory, said "Our club sets extremely high standards and we are disappointed with the results of the recent A-League season and also our start to the Champions League campaign" and that "Our intent is to continue to be the benchmark club in the A-League. We wish to be successful in Asia and believe this decision will assist in taking us to that level." Merrick was the last foundation coach to be sacked.

Ernie Merrick was awarded coach of the year in 2007 and again in 2010.

=== Hong Kong national football team ===
The Hong Kong Football Association, on 16 December 2011, confirmed the appointment of Ernie Merrick as the new National Head Coach. On 26 October 2012, it was confirmed that Ernie Merrick left his position as the team's Head Coach.

=== Wellington Phoenix ===
On 20 May 2013, Merrick was announced as the head coach for Wellington Phoenix on a two-year contract, with an option for a third year. In his second season Merrick coached the team to third equal on the ladder with Adelaide Utd on 46 points and following this success he signed a 3-year contract extension.

On 5 December 2016, Merrick resigned from the Phoenix following a 2–0 loss to Adelaide United.

=== Newcastle Jets ===
In May 2017, Merrick was announced as the new coach of Newcastle Jets, following the sacking of Mark Jones after Newcastle Jets finished bottom of the league in the 2016–17 season. Merrick took the Jets to the Grand Final in his first year despite losing the club's top goal scorer Andrew Nabbout in the January transfer window. The Jets played Melbourne Victory and lost the game after a controversial VAR decision. The following year Sydney FC made an offer to him but he declined and on 17 April 2018, Merrick signed an improved contract keeping him with the Jets until the end of the 2019/20 Hyundai A-League season. Having lost seven starting line-up players through transfers over the twelve-month period since the Grand Final and with long-term injuries to new signing Wes Hoolahan and Captain Nigel Boogaard, the club's results deteriorated and Merrick was sacked by the Jets on 6 January 2020.

=== St Kilda ===
In early 2022, Merrick joined AFL club St Kilda as a mentor to senior coach Brett Ratten. The role includes match day duties and weekday roles with the football department.

== Football Australia ==
In August 2022, Merrick was appointed the inaugural Chief Football Officer of Football Australia. Merrick will have a very broad range of responsibilities as chief football officer, from advising Football Australia on football matters and global trends, helping to define and set a 'national style' of play, overseeing coach education programs, optimising player development systems and assisting Football Australia in pushing through proposed reforms like a domestic transfer system and the National Second Division.

== Personal life ==
Merrick was born in Edinburgh to a circus family. Before entering the head coaching ranks, he was a PE teacher as well as a semi-professional football player.

== Coaching statistics ==
As of 4 June 2019

Team	Nat	From	To	Record				
Team	Nat	From	To	G	W	D	L	Win %
Melbourne Victory	(Australia)	2005	2011	170	74	41	55	43.53
Hong Kong	(Hong Kong)	16 December 2011	26 October 2012	4	2	0	2	50.00
Wellington Phoenix	(New Zealand) (team competes in (Australia) )	20 May 2013	5 December 2016	94	31	15	48	32.98
Newcastle Jets	(Australia)	9 May 2017	6 Jan 2020	61	28	10	23	45.90
Total				329	135	66	128	41.03

== Honours ==
=== Coach ===
With Melbourne Victory:

- A-League Championship: 2006–2007, 2008–2009
- A-League Premiership: 2006–2007, 2008–2009
- A-League Pre-Season Challenge Cup: 2008

Personal Honours:

- A-League Coach of the Year: 2006–2007, 2009–10
- Order of Australia: 2014
