= Michael Theo =

Australian soccer player (born 1981)

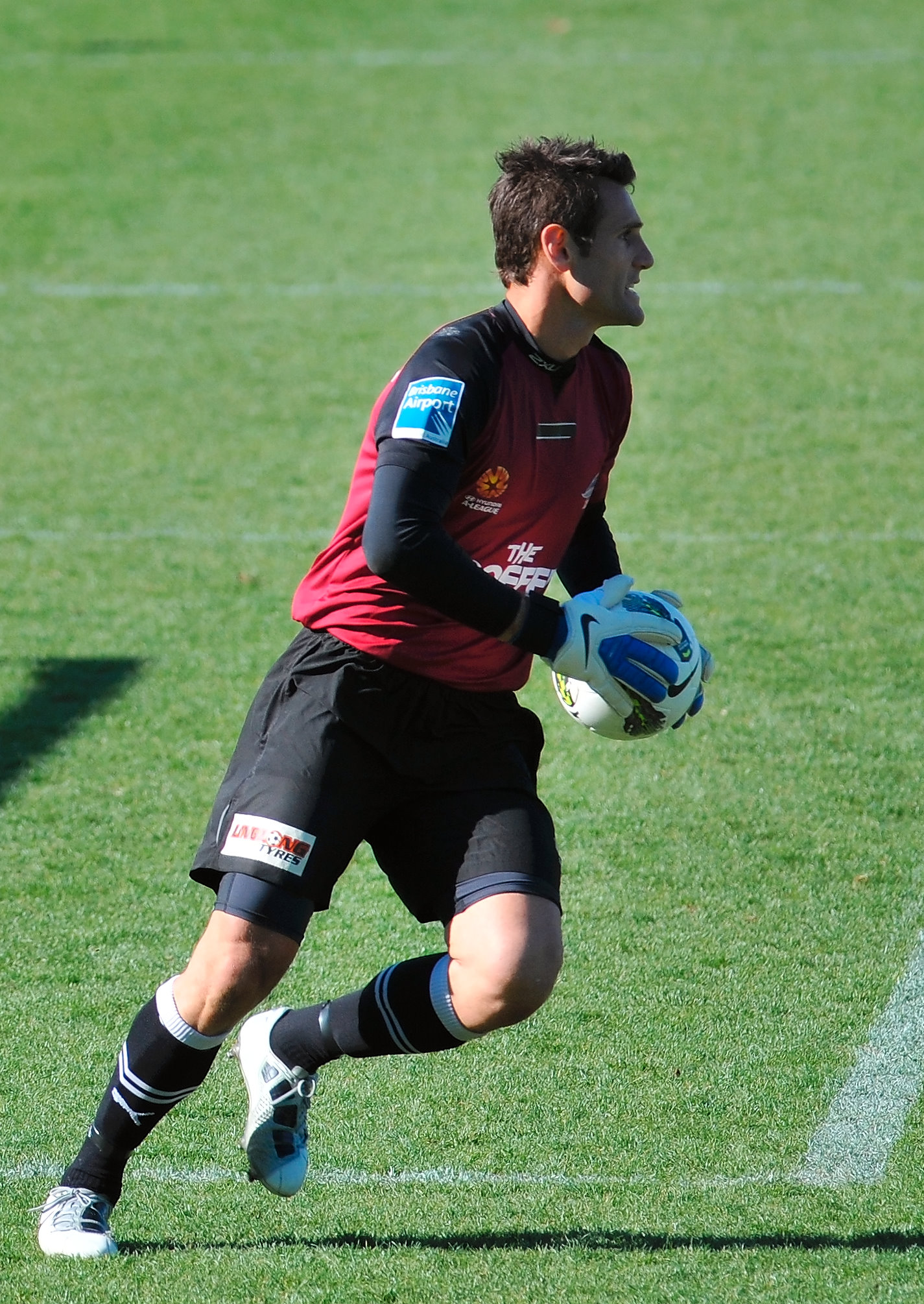
- Theo playing for Brisbane Roar in 2011

Personal information
- Full name: Michael Theo
- Birth name: Michael Theoklitos
- Date of birth: 11 February 1981 (age 45)
- Place of birth: Melbourne, Australia
- Height: 1.86 m (6 ft 1 in)
- Position: Goalkeeper

Senior career*
Years	Team	Apps	(Gls)
1998–2000	Bulleen Inter Kings	0	(0)
2000	Bulleen Zebras	1	(0)
2000–2001	South Melbourne	5	(0)
2001	Bulleen Zebras	24	(0)
2001–2002	Football Kingz	20	(0)
2002–2003	Blackpool	2	(0)
2003–2004	South Melbourne	5	(0)
2004	Bulleen Zebras	19	(0)
2005–2009	Melbourne Victory	71	(0)
2009–2010	Norwich City	1	(0)
2010–2018	Brisbane Roar	159	(0)
2019	Nunawading City		

Managerial career
- 2021–: Western United FC (Goalkeeping coach)
- 2022–: Nunawading City (Assistant coach)
- * Club domestic league appearances and goals

Serafim Michael Theo (né Theoklitos) (born 11 February 1981) is an Australian goalkeeper. Until 2025, Theo was the goalkeeping coach at A-League club Western United FC. He is now the goalkeeping coach at NRL team Avondale Heights FC.

== Career ==
=== Early career ===
Theoklitos began his football journey through the junior ranks at now defunct East Richmond Jaguars. His career as a semi-pro began by playing in the Victorian Premier League (VPL) for Bulleen Zebras. He was then picked up by South Melbourne FC but failed to make an impact ahead of number 1 Eugene Galekovic. After 5 appearances for Hellas, he was sold to the Football Kingz FC for the 2001–2002 season where he became a fan favourite making 20 appearances in the National Soccer League. During his time with the Kingz he was scouted by Blackpool FC who signed him in 2002. Due to injury he only played in three games, only two of which counted as full representation for Blackpool. He returned to Australia where he rejoined Bulleen. While playing for them in the 2004 VPL final, he saved three of four penalties to help Bulleen to victory.

=== Melbourne Victory ===
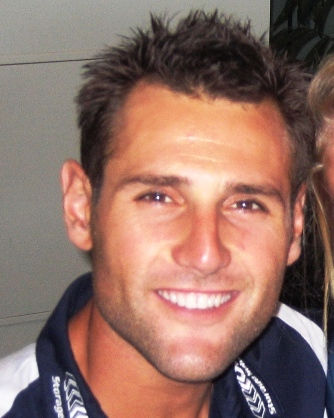
Michael Theo (then known as Theoklitos) with Melbourne Victory in 2008.

He joined Melbourne Victory FC for their inaugural season in the 2005/06 A-League. In the 2006/07 A-League season, Theoklitos kept ten clean sheets from 21 games, attracting interest from both the Australia and Greece national associations. He has not made a senior appearance for either country.

In the 2008/09 season, Theoklitos was part of Melbourne Victory's grand-final success, keeping five clean sheets at the end of the season. He earned another call-up to the Australian national squad for the match against Kuwait on 5 March 2009, but did not play.

In May 2009, Theoklitos declined a contract extension. In July 2009, it was confirmed that he would be leaving Melbourne Victory, with his contract expiring on 30 July. In early July 2009, he signed a two-year contract with English League One side Norwich City.

=== Norwich City ===
In the opening match of the season on 8 August 2009, Theoklitos made his debut for Norwich against Colchester United at Carrow Road, conceding five goals before half-time and seven in total. He described the match as "the worst performance I've had in my career" to BBC Radio Norfolk. Despite the performance, Theoklitos still had the support of manager Bryan Gunn, a former goalkeeper himself. However, Gunn did not have the support of the Norwich board, and was replaced by Colchester manager Paul Lambert, who had engineered the 7–1 defeat. Under Lambert, Theoklitos was demoted to third-choice goalkeeper.

He was recalled to the first-team bench for a Football League Trophy match against Gillingham, but according to the club he failed to show up for the match, causing the club to discipline him. Theoklitos denied the claim, saying "It's not that I did not turn up but I was half an hour late" because "I got my wires mixed up".

Lambert confirmed in December 2009 that he expected Theoklitos to be leaving the club. Theoklitos' contract was terminated by mutual consent in March 2010. His debut was the only game he played for the Canaries.

=== Brisbane Roar ===
On 14 March 2010, Theoklitos signed with the Brisbane Roar on a three-year deal. He made his debut in round one of the A league season against Gold Coast United, in a 0–0 draw. Theoklitos registered a second clean sheet against Sydney FC in round two.

Following the 3–0 loss to Melbourne Victory, Theoklitos had gone 876 minutes without conceding a goal, setting a new record for the most minutes without conceding a goal in an Australian League—beating former recordholder Jeff Olver's record of 790 minutes. Theoklitos won the Goalkeeper of the Year award for the 2010/11 A-League season.

Prior to the 2014/15 season, Theo sustained a wrist injury in pre-season training which ruled him out for half of the season. Theo returned after the January Asian Cup break with a 3–2 home win against the Wellington Phoenix, despite conceding a foolish goal which was credited to Kenny Cunningham. Theo went on to play 3 more matches that season, keeping a clean sheet against the Central Coast Mariners, before injuring his quad muscle.

On 27 March 2018, it was announced that Theo's contract with the Roar would not be renewed after the 2017–18 A-League.

== Career statistics ==
As of 16 March 2014

CS = Clean Sheets

Club	Season	Division	League^{1}		Cup		International^{2}		Total	
Club	Season	Division	Apps	CS	Apps	CS	Apps	CS	Apps	CS
Bulleen Zebras	2000	Victorian Premier League	1	?	0	0	-	-	1	?
Bulleen Zebras	2001	Victorian Premier League	24	?	0	0	-	-	24	?
Bulleen Zebras	2004	Victorian Premier League	19	?	0	0	-	-	19	?
Bulleen Zebras	Total		44	?	0	0	-	-	44	?
South Melbourne	2000–01	National Soccer League	0	0	0	0	0	0	0	0
South Melbourne	2003–04	National Soccer League	5	3	0	0	0	0	5	3
South Melbourne	Total		5	3	0	0	0	0	5	3
Football Kingz	2001–02	National Soccer League	20	3	0	0	0	0	20	3
Football Kingz	Total		20	3	0	0	0	0	20	3
Blackpool	2002–03	Division Two	2	0	0	0	-	-	2	0
Blackpool	Total		2	0	0	0	-	-	2	0
Melbourne Victory	2005–06	A-League	10	1	2	1	-	-	12	2
Melbourne Victory	2006–07	A-League	20	10	2	1	-	-	22	11
Melbourne Victory	2007–08	A-League	20	6	4	0	5	1	29	7
Melbourne Victory	2008–09	A-League	21	10	4	3	-	-	25	13
Melbourne Victory	Total		71	27	12	5	5	1	88	33
Norwich City	2009–10	Football League One	1	0	0	0	-	-	1	0
Norwich City	Total		1	0	0	0	0	0	1	0
Brisbane Roar	2010–11	A-League	33	12	-	-	-	-	33	12
Brisbane Roar	2011–12	A-League	29	8	-	-	6	0	35	8
Brisbane Roar	2012–13	A-League	29	8	-	-	1	1	30	9
Brisbane Roar	2013–14	A-League	21	5	-	-	-	-	21	5
Brisbane Roar	2014–15	A-League	4	1	-	-	-	-	4	1
Brisbane Roar	Total		112	33	-	-	7	1	119	34
Career Total			255	66	12	5	12	2	279	73

^{1} – includes A-League final series statistics
^{2} – AFC Champions League statistics are included in season ending during group stages (i.e. ACL 2012 and A-League season 2011–12 etc.)

== Personal life ==
Theoklitos was born in Melbourne, Australia and is of Greek ancestry.

The Michael Theo Soccer Academy was established in 2010, running annual clinics during the July school holiday period.

On 1 August 2012 Theoklitos announced that he had changed his name by deed poll to Michael Theo. He said of the change:

"Around the football traps, I've always been known as Michael Theo so I just thought, why not make it official? It's no big deal, I haven't changed my name completely, just shortened it. I've been thinking about it for a while and it was a decision I made on my own, it's really not so hard to do on deed poll. My signature has altered, slightly changed but that's pretty much it."

== Honours ==
Current as at 15 March 2017

With Melbourne Victory:

- A-League Championship (2): 2006–2007, 2008–2009
- A-League Premiership (2): 2006–2007, 2008–2009

With Brisbane Roar:

- A-League Premiership (2): 2010–2011, 2013–2014
- A-League Championship (3): 2010–2011, 2011–2012, 2013–2014

Personal honours:

- A-League Goalkeeper of the Year (3): 2006–2007, 2007–2008, 2010–2011
- Most minutes (876) not conceding a goal in an Australian League (With Brisbane Roar, 2010–11)
- Third Most clean sheets (68) in A-League history.
- A-League All Star: 2013
