= José Luis López (Costa Rican footballer) =

Costa Rican footballer (born 1981)

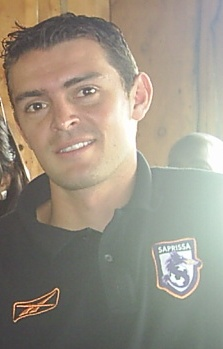

Personal information
- Full name: José Luis López Ramírez
- Date of birth: March 31, 1981 (age 45)
- Place of birth: San José, Costa Rica
- Height: 1.78 m (5 ft 10 in)
- Position: Defensive midfielder

Youth career
- Broncos de Zapote
- Universidad

Senior career*
Years	Team	Apps	(Gls)
1997–2003	Herediano		
2003–2011	Saprissa	155	(6)
2008–2009	→ Melbourne Victory (loan)	18	(0)
2010	→ Dalian Shide (loan)	9	(0)
2011–2013	Belén Siglo XXI	53	(8)
2013–2014	Uruguay de Coronado	30	(1)

International career^{‡}
2001	Costa Rica U-20	7	(1)
2004	Costa Rica U-23	10	(2)
2003–2011	Costa Rica	34	(0)
- * Club domestic league appearances and goals as of 29 June 2014 ‡ National team caps and goals as of 2009

José Luis López Ramírez (born March 31, 1981) is a Costa Rican footballer.

== Club career ==
López made his professional debut for Herediano on 4 January 1997 against Saprissa and left them for Saprissa in 2003.

With Saprissa he had already won five national championships, a UNCAF Cup and a CONCACAF Champions Cup title, in less than four years, and was part of the team that played the 2005 FIFA Club World Championship, where Saprissa finished third behind São Paulo and Liverpool.

López joined the Australian club Melbourne Victory in July 2008 on a two-year loan deal, after the club managed to free up a space for another international player following left-back Joseph Keenan's release by mutual consent. López made his debut for Melbourne Victory against Perth Glory in the 2008–09 A-League Pre-Season Cup on Saturday, July 26, 2008, with Melbourne winning the game 1–0 through a Michael Thwaite header. He returned to Saprissa in summer 2009.

In March 2010, López joined Chinese club Dalian Shide as a replacement of Zhao Xuri, who left the club for Xi'an Chanba. In July 2011, López moved to the newly promoted Costa Rican Primera División club Belén Siglo XXI on a free transfer and in August 2013 he signed for Uruguay de Coronado.

== International career ==
Commonly known as Puppy or Pupy, he has been an important player for the Costa Rica national football team at numerous levels, playing in and captaining the under-20 team at the 2001 FIFA World Youth Championship held in Argentina, as well as representing the country with the U-23 team at the 2004 Summer Olympics, held in Athens.

He has also been capped 34 times for the full national team, making his debut in a friendly against the United States on September 7, 2003, playing for the team during 2006 FIFA World Cup and 2010 FIFA World Cup Qualifying.

López Ramírez made three appearances at the 2005 CONCACAF Gold Cup.

== Honours ==
With Melbourne Victory:

- A-League Championship: 2008–2009
- A-League Premiership: 2008–2009
