= 2008 A-League Pre-season Challenge Cup =

Tournament details
- Country: Australia; New Zealand
- Dates: 19 July – 6 August 2008
- Teams: 8

Final positions
- Champions: Melbourne Victory (1st title)
- Runners-up: Wellington Phoenix

Tournament statistics
- Matches played: 13
- Goals scored: 24 (1.85 per match)
- Top goal scorer(s): Cristiano; Sergio van Dijk (2 goals)

The 2008 A-League Pre-season Challenge Cup competition was held in July and August 2008, in the lead up to the start of the Australian A-League football 2008–09 season.

All eight A-League clubs competed and were drawn into two groups of four teams. The format of the cup was modified from previous editions, reducing the number of matches. A group stage with three regular rounds saw team play each other in their group once, with the winner of each group advancing to the final. The final was played on 6 August, the first mid-week final in the competition history. The shortened format allowed clubs to schedule other matches in the lead up to the start of the A-League, and was completed before the 2008 Summer Olympics in which Australia competed.

Continuing from previous years, most Pre-season Cup matches were played at venues in regional centres to expand the profile of the clubs and the league. Bunbury, Caloundra, Cessnock, Mandurah and Mount Gambier all hosted matches for the first time, while Launceston, Campbelltown, Port Macquarie and Wollongong hosted matches again.

== Group stage ==
=== Group A ===
| Team | Pld | W | D | L | GF | GA | GD | Pts | Qualification |
|---|---|---|---|---|---|---|---|---|---|
| Melbourne Victory | 3 | 2 | 0 | 1 | 3 | 2 | +1 | 6 | Advances to final |
| Adelaide United | 3 | 1 | 2 | 0 | 2 | 1 | +1 | 5 | |
| Newcastle Jets | 3 | 0 | 2 | 1 | 1 | 2 | −1 | 2 | |
| Perth Glory | 3 | 0 | 2 | 1 | 1 | 2 | −1 | 2 | |

19 July 2008
19:00 UTC+8

| Perth Glory | 1–1 | Newcastle Jets |
|---|---|---|
| Trinidad 12' | Report | Spencer 36' |

Hyundai Stadium, Mandurah
Attendance: 3,825
Referee: Steven Gregory
20 July 2008
13:00 UTC+10

| Melbourne Victory | 1–2 | Adelaide United |
|---|---|---|
| Ney Fabiano 8' | Report | Cristiano 33', 90' |

Aurora Stadium, Launceston
Attendance: 4,720
Referee: Ben Williams

26 July 2008
15:00 UTC+8

| Perth Glory | 0–1 | Melbourne Victory |
|---|---|---|
| | Report | Thwaite 11' |

Members Equity Stadium, Perth
Attendance: 3,020
Referee: Craig Zetter
26 July 2008
19:00 UTC+10

| Newcastle Jets | 0–0 | Adelaide United |
|---|---|---|
| | Report |

Baddeley Park, Cessnock
Attendance: 2,756
Referee: James Lewis

2 August 2008
14:30 UTC+10

| Newcastle Jets | 0–1 | Melbourne Victory |
|---|---|---|
| | Report | Pondeljak 82' |

Port Macquarie Regional Stadium, Port Macquarie
Attendance: 3,133
Referee: Stuart Wolfe
2 August 2008
14:30 UTC+9:30

| Adelaide United | 0–0 | Perth Glory |
|---|---|---|
| | Report |

Vansittart Park, Mount Gambier
Attendance: 3,000
Referee: Kevin Docherty

=== Group B ===
| Team | Pld | W | D | L | GF | GA | GD | Pts | Qualification |
|---|---|---|---|---|---|---|---|---|---|
| Wellington Phoenix | 3 | 2 | 1 | 0 | 5 | 3 | +2 | 7 | Advances to final |
| Central Coast Mariners | 3 | 2 | 0 | 1 | 5 | 2 | +3 | 6 | |
| Sydney FC | 3 | 1 | 0 | 2 | 4 | 7 | −3 | 3 | |
| Queensland Roar | 3 | 0 | 1 | 2 | 3 | 5 | −2 | 1 | |

19 July 2008
19:00 UTC+8

| Sydney FC | 2–1 | Queensland Roar |
|---|---|---|
| Payne 53'; Prentice 57' | Report | van Dijk 49'; Hyuk-Su Seo (red card) 57' |

Campbelltown Stadium, Sydney
Attendance: 4,222
Referee: Matthew Breeze
20 July 2008
16:00 UTC+12

| Wellington Phoenix | 1–0 | Central Coast Mariners |
|---|---|---|
| Daniel 72' | Report |

Westpac Stadium, Wellington
Attendance: 4,853
Referee: Michael Hester

27 July 2008
15:00 UTC+10

| Central Coast Mariners | 3–0 | Sydney FC |
|---|---|---|
| Porter 43'; Petrovski 60'; Mrdja 68' | Report |

Bluetongue Stadium, Gosford
Attendance: 7,107
Referee: Chris Beath
27 July 2008
15:00 UTC+10

| Queensland Roar | 1–1 | Wellington Phoenix |
|---|---|---|
| van Dijk 18' | Report | Kwasnik 74' |

Stockland Park, Sunshine Coast
Attendance: 3,832
Referee: Regis Queffelec

2 August 2008
19:00 UTC+10

| Sydney FC | 2–3 | Wellington Phoenix |
|---|---|---|
| Brosque 16'; Fyfe 39'; Prentice (red card) 90' | Report | Hearfield 57'; Smeltz 62'; Gao 82'; Durante (yellow card) 90' (yellow-red card) |

WIN Stadium, Wollongong
Attendance: 6,124
Referee: Strebre Delovski
3 August 2008
15:00 UTC+10

| Queensland Roar | 1–2 | Central Coast Mariners |
|---|---|---|
| Moore (red card) 49'; Zullo 51' | Report | Elrich 29'; MacAllister 32' |

Perry Park, Brisbane
Attendance: 3,241
Referee: Peter Green

== Final ==
6 August 2008
19:30 UTC+12

| Wellington Phoenix | 0–0 | Melbourne Victory |
|---|---|---|
| | Report |
Penalties
| Smeltz (penalty missed); Bertos (penalty scored); Hearfield (penalty scored); Conveny (penalty scored); Daniel (penalty scored); Ferrante (penalty scored); McKain (penalty scored); Johnson (penalty scored); Dodd (penalty missed) | 7–8 | Vargas (penalty scored); Pondeljak (penalty scored); López (penalty scored); Ward (penalty missed); Hernández (penalty scored); Ryall (penalty scored); Allsopp (penalty scored); Kemp (penalty scored); Berger (penalty scored) |

Westpac Stadium, Wellington
Attendance: 9,208
Referee: Peter O'Leary

== Top goalscorers ==
2 Goals:

- (Brazil) Cristiano (Adelaide United)
- (Netherlands) Sergio van Dijk (Queensland Roar)

1 Goal:

- (Argentina) Adrian Trinidad (Perth Glory)
- (Australia) Ahmad Elrich (Central Coast Mariners)
- (Australia) Dylan MacAllister (Central Coast Mariners)
- (Australia) Nik Mrdja (Central Coast Mariners)
- (Australia) Sasho Petrovski (Central Coast Mariners)
- (Australia) Brad Porter (Central Coast Mariners)
- (Australia) Tom Pondeljak (Melbourne Victory)
- (Australia) Michael Thwaite (Melbourne Victory)
- (Australia) Noel Spencer (Newcastle Jets)
- (Australia) Michael Zullo (Queensland Roar)
- (Australia) Alex Brosque (Sydney FC)
- (Australia) Iain Fyfe (Sydney FC)
- (Australia) Chris Payne (Sydney FC)
- (Australia) Mitchell Prentice (Sydney FC)
- (Australia) Troy Hearfield (Wellington Phoenix FC)
- (Australia) Adam Kwasnik (Wellington Phoenix FC)
- (Brazil) Ney Fabiano (Melbourne Victory)
- (Brazil) Daniel (Wellington Phoenix FC)
- (China) Gao Leilei (Wellington Phoenix FC)
- (New Zealand) Shane Smeltz (Wellington Phoenix FC)
