= Tom Pondeljak =

Australian soccer player

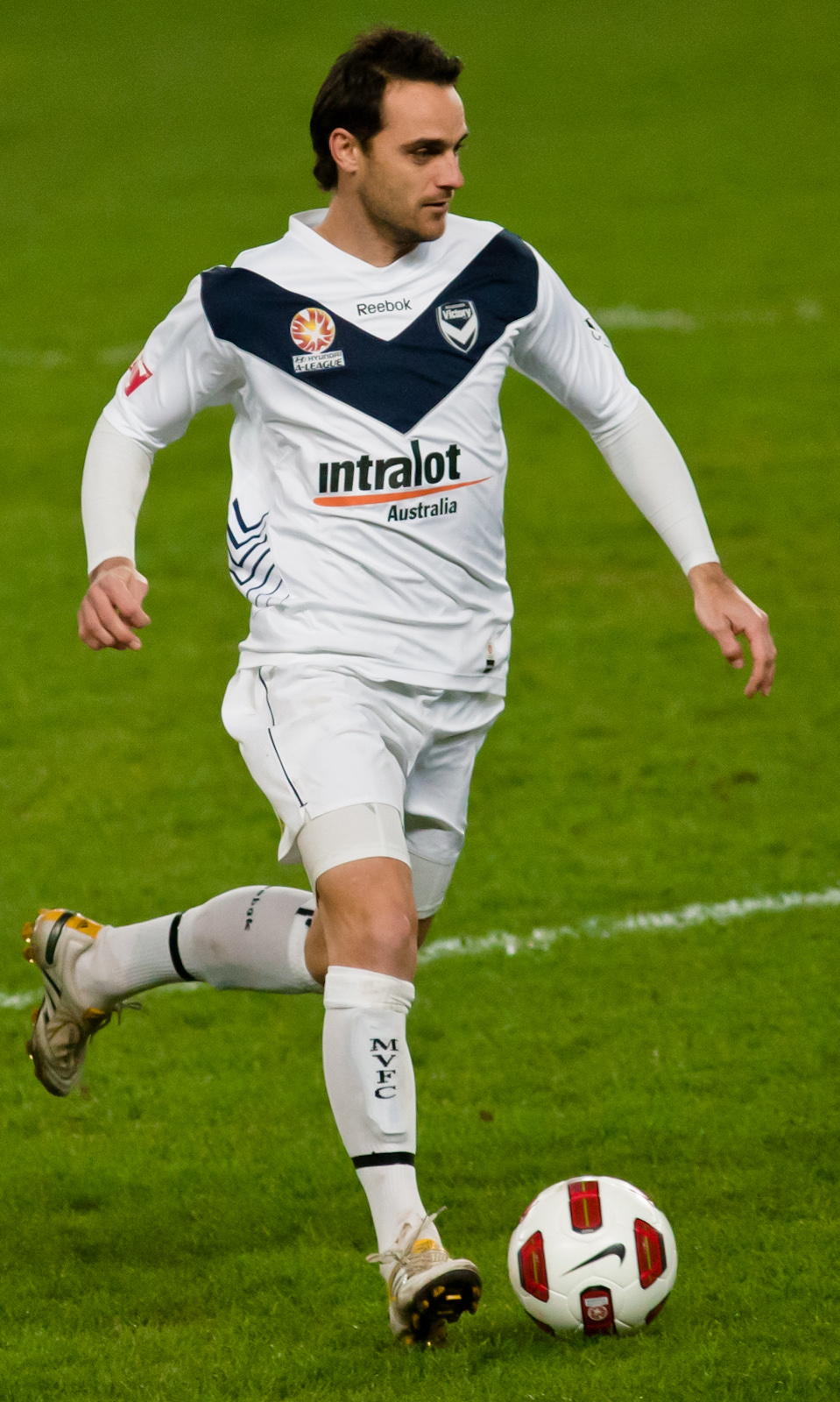
- Pondeljak playing for Melbourne Victory in 2010

Personal information
- Full name: Tomislav Pondeljak
- Date of birth: 8 January 1976 (age 50)
- Place of birth: Melbourne, Australia
- Height: 1.77 m (5 ft 10 in)
- Position: Attacking midfielder

Youth career
- 1992–1993: VIS

Senior career*
Years	Team	Apps	(Gls)
1993–1995	St. Albans	62	(14)
1995–1999	Melbourne Knights	97	(29)
1999–2001	Sydney United	60	(6)
2001–2003	Sydney Olympic	63	(13)
2003–2004	Perth Glory	26	(7)
2004	Johor FA	14	(8)
2005–2008	Central Coast Mariners	55	(7)
2008–2012	Melbourne Victory	78	(7)
2012–2013	St. Albans	26	(8)

International career^{‡}
2002–2009	Australia	6	(0)

Managerial career
- 2023–: St Albans Dinamo (Women)
Medal record
Representing Australia
Men's Association football
OFC Nations Cup
Runner-up	2002 New Zealand
- * Club domestic league appearances and goals as of 23 November 2015 ‡ National team caps and goals as of 17:30, 12 November 2010 (UTC)

Tomislav "Tom" Pondeljak (born 8 January 1976 in Melbourne, Victoria, Australia) is a retired Australian football (soccer) player who last played for Victorian Premier League side St Albans Saints SC. He is currently the head coach of the St Albans Dinamo Senior Women's team.

== Club career ==
Pondeljak started his career in the Victorian Institute of Sport (VIS) before playing for St Albans, making 62 appearances in his 2 1/2-year spell at the lower league Victorian club. He was then brought into the National Soccer League (NSL) by the Melbourne Knights and helped them to victory during the 1995–96 NSL season. After playing another 3 1/2 years and a total of 97 appearances for the Melbourne club, he moved to Sydney United.

Not much success was had in his two years at the club, and Pondeljak eventually moved to cross town rivals Sydney Olympic, where he won his second NSL title. He then moved on to Perth Glory, where he won his third NSL title. Following the collapse of the NSL at the end of the 2003/04 season, he went to Malaysia and played for Johor FC.

When the A-League was formed, Pondeljak was being chased by a number of teams including Sydney FC, Perth Glory, Newcastle Jets and his hometown team Melbourne Victory but it was the Central Coast Mariners who made the best offer and he accepted that offer, becoming one of the marquee signings for the Mariners.

The 2005/06 season was not the best for Pondeljak as he was injured for about two months with a fractured and dislocated wrist. He did however produce one of the goals of the season against Sydney FC. He ran into the penalty area, turned three Sydney FC players and slotted the ball past the outstretched arm of goalkeeper Clint Bolton. He scored the only goal of the Preliminary Final against Adelaide United to send the Central Coast Mariners into the Grand Final.

On 27 February 2008, Pondeljak signed a two-year contract with Melbourne Victory.

Pondeljak was promoted to Victory's starting 11 following his debut against South Korea's Chunnam Dragons and proved his worth on four minutes with a cracking shot from outside the penalty area that gave the visitors a perfect start.

On 28 January 2009, Pondeljak started for Australia in their Asian Cup qualifying match against Indonesia, which was Pondeljak's first international appearance in seven years, and added to the four caps he had earned back in 2002.

A month later, on 28 February 2009, Pondeljak scored what proved to be the winning goal in Melbourne Victory's 1–0 triumph over arch-rivals Adelaide United in the A-League Grand Final. He was later substituted for teammate Grant Brebner and was awarded the Joe Marston Medal for man of the match.

Pondeljak left Melbourne Victory at the conclusion of the 2011–12 A-League season and returned to boyhood club St Albans Saints.

Pondeljak retired at the end of the 2013 Victorian State League One season, helping Dinamo avoid relegation in a tough season.

== A-League career statistics ==
(Correct as of 5 February 2010)

Club	Season	League			Finals			Asia			Total		
Club	Season	Apps	Goals	Assists	Apps	Goals	Assists	Apps	Goals	Assists	Apps	Goals	Assists
Central Coast Mariners	2005–06	15	2	6	3	0	0	-	-	-	18	2	6
Central Coast Mariners	2006–07	16	3	0	-	-	-	-	-	-	16	3	0
Central Coast Mariners	2007–08	17	1	5	4	1	0	-	-	-	21	2	5
Melbourne Victory	2008–09	19	1	3	3	2	0	2	1	0	24	4	3
Melbourne Victory	2009–10	20	2	2							20	2	2
Total											99	13	16

== National team statistics ==
Australia national team
Year	Apps	Goals
2002	4	0
2003	0	0
2004	0	0
2005	0	0
2006	0	0
2007	0	0
2008	0	0
2009	2	0
Total	6	0

== Honours ==
Melbourne Victory

- A-League Championship: 2008–09
- A-League Premiership: 2008–09

Central Coast Mariners

- A-League Premiership: 2007–08

Perth Glory

- NSL Championship: 2003–04

Sydney Olympic

- NSL Championship: 2001–02

Melbourne Knights

- NSL Championship: 1995–96

Australia

- OFC Nations Cup: runner-up 2002
