= A-League Pre-season Challenge Cup =

Defunct association football tournament in Australia

A-League Pre-Season Challenge Cup
- Organiser(s): Football Federation Australia
- Founded: 2005
- Abolished: 2009
- Teams: 8
- Last champions: Melbourne Victory
- Most championships: Adelaide United (2 titles)

The A-League Pre-season Challenge Cup competition was an annual soccer tournament held for all A-League clubs in July and August in the lead up to the start of the A-League season. The competition featured a group stage and a knockout stage. Commentators did not give much weight to the competition as a guide for performance during the season proper, as injuries or club strategic policy ruled that many teams did not use their best players and often used experimental tactics. The Pre-Season Cup was removed from the 2009–10 A-League schedule in order to give the clubs more control over their own pre-season training.

== History ==
=== 2005–2006 ===
The inaugural A-League Pre-Season Challenge Cup was won by Central Coast Mariners after they beat the reigning NSL Champions, Perth Glory 1–0 in the grand final. The event was a huge success and attracted clubs to thoroughly prepare for their A-League endeavours. The second edition of the Pre-Season Cup was used to enhance the A-League's profiles by playing pre-season games in regional centres including the Gold Coast, Sunshine Coast, Toowoomba, Launceston, Canberra, Wollongong, Port Macquarie, Orange and Tamworth. A new format allowed matches for: third, fifth and seventh place as well as a grand final. A trophy was given to the teams that finished first, second and third. Adelaide United won the Grand Final after beating reigning champions Central Coast Mariners 5–4 on penalties after 1–1 at the end of extra time. Sydney FC finished in third place.

=== 2007–2008 ===
The 2007 edition had an identical format as the 2006 edition, it was won by Adelaide United after they came back from 1–0 down to win the game 2–1, 9,606 spectators attended the grand final and just over 3,500 spectators attended the third place play-off where Brisbane Roar beat Central Coast Mariners 3–1 after the Roar received two red cards during the match.

Bunbury, Caloundra, Cessnock, Mandurah and Mount Gambier all hosted matches for the first time. The Format changed again, the third, fifth and seventh place matches were removed and the top team from each group played each other instead of the regular knockout format. Melbourne Victory won the last ever A-League Pre-Season Challenge Cup after beating Wellington Phoenix 8–7 in a penalty shoot-out after a 0–0 score at the end of extra time.

== Format ==
In the Pre-Season Cup, the teams were evenly placed into two groups. Each team played the others in the group once over three rounds.

Beginning in 2006, an additional bonus round was then held, with each team playing a cross-over match with a team from a different group. In addition to the standard points (3 for a win, 1 for a draw), there were special bonus points on offer for the bonus round matches:

- 1 bonus point for 2 goals scored by a team,
- 2 bonus points for 3 goals scored by a team, or
- 3 bonus points for 4 or more goals scored by a team.
- 4 bonus points for scoring 5 goals by a player.

This format was edited for the 2007 competition. The bonus round was removed, and the bonus points system introduced into each of the first three rounds. All eight teams then entered a knock-out round, culminating in the final in late August.

== Results by club ==
Pre-Season Challenge Cup winners by club
Team	Winners	Runners-up	Third place (Note: Only the 2006 & 2007 competitions had a third place play-off match.)	Fourth place	Years won	Years lost
Adelaide United	2	0	0	0	2006, 2007	
Central Coast Mariners	1	1	0	1	2005	2006
Melbourne Victory	1	0	0	0	2008	
Perth Glory	0	2	0	0		2005, 2007
Wellington Phoenix	0	1	0	0		2007
Brisbane Roar	0	0	1	0		
Sydney FC	0	0	1	0		
Newcastle Jets	0	0	0	1		

== Past tournaments/winners ==
Season	Grand Final Date	Winning Team	Score	Losing Team	Location	GF Attendance
2005	21 August 2005	Central Coast Mariners (1)	1–0	Perth Glory	Bluetongue Central Coast Stadium, Gosford (1)	6,609
2006	19 August 2006	Adelaide United (1)	1–1 (5–4) (PSO)	Central Coast Mariners	Bluetongue Central Coast Stadium, Gosford (2)	10,453
2007	12 August 2007	Adelaide United (2)	2–1	Perth Glory	Hindmarsh Stadium, Adelaide (1)	9,606
2008	6 August 2008	Melbourne Victory (1)	0–0 (8–7) (PSO)	Wellington Phoenix	Westpac Stadium, Wellington (1)	9,208

== Records ==
- Most tournament wins (team): 2 wins, Adelaide United
- Most final appearances (team): 2, Adelaide United, Central Coast Mariners & Perth Glory
- Most goals scored in a match (team): 5 goals, by Queensland Roar vs. New Zealand Knights, 30 July 2005
- Biggest win: New Zealand Knights 0–5 Queensland Roar, group stage, 30 July 2005
- Biggest win in a final: Central Coast Mariners 1–0 Perth Glory, 20 August 2005 & Adelaide United 2–1 Perth Glory, 12 August 2007.
- Most penalties in a deciding penalty shootout: 8 – Wellington Phoenix 7–8 Melbourne Victory (6 August 2008)
