= 2008–09 Wellington Phoenix FC season =

Wellington Phoenix FC
2008–09 season
- CEO: Tony Pignata
- Chairman: Terry Serepisos
- Manager: Ricki Herbert
- A-League: 6th
- Preseason Cup: 2nd
- Finals: Did not qualify
- Top goalscorer: Shane Smeltz; 12 Goals
- Highest home attendance: 10,516 v Queensland; 17 August 2008
- Lowest home attendance: 5,500 v Newcastle; 23 November 2008
Home colours	Away colours

The 2008–09 season was Wellington Phoenix's second season in the A-League.

== Players ==
=== First-team squad ===
Note: Flags indicate national team as defined under FIFA eligibility rules; some limited exceptions apply. Players may hold more than one non-FIFA nationality.

No.	Pos.	Nation	Player
1	GK	NZL	Mark Paston
2	DF	NZL	Jeremy Christie
3	DF	NZL	Tony Lochhead
4	DF	AUS	Jon McKain
5	DF	AUS	Karl Dodd
6	MF	NZL	Tim Brown (Vice-Captain)
7	MF	NZL	Leo Bertos
8	FW	NZL	Vaughan Coveny
9	FW	NZL	Shane Smeltz
10	MF	AUS	Michael Ferrante
11	MF	BRA	Daniel
12	MF	AUS	Richard Johnson
13	MF	AUS	Troy Hearfield

No.	Pos.	Nation	Player
15	FW	AUS	Adam Kwasnik
16	DF	NZL	David Mulligan
17	MF	AUS	Vince Lia
18	DF	NZL	Ben Sigmund
19	FW	NZL	Greg Draper
20	GK	NZL	Glen Moss
21	MF	CHN	Leilei Gao
22	DF	AUS	Andrew Durante (Captain)
23	FW	NZL	Kosta Barbarouses
25	DF	AUS	Manny Muscat
26	MF	BRA	Fred
30	GK	AUS	Scott Higgins

=== Transfers ===
==== In ====
No.	Pos.	Player	From	Notes
4	DF	(Australia) Jon McKain	(Romania) FCU Politehnica Timişoara	
7	MF	(New Zealand) Leo Bertos	(Australia) Perth Glory	
13	MF	(Australia) Troy Hearfield	(Australia) Newcastle Jets	
16	DF	(New Zealand) David Mulligan	(England) Port Vale	
21	MF	(China) Leilei Gao	(Finland) MyPa	
22	DF	(Australia) Andrew Durante	(Australia) Newcastle Jets	
25	DF	(Australia) Manny Muscat	(Australia) Green Gully Cavaliers	
26	MF	(Brazil) Fred	(United States) D.C. United	On loan
30	GK	(Australia) Scott Higgins	(Australia) Adelaide United	Short term injury cover

==== Out ====
No.	Pos.	Player	From	Notes
4	DF	(Brazil) Cleberson	(Brazil) America	
13	DF	(Australia) Steven Old	(Australia) Macarthur Rams	
14	DF	(Australia) Steven O'Dor	(Australia) South Melbourne	
15	MF	(Brazil) George	(Venezuela) Carabobo	
16	DF	(Australia) Kristian Rees	(Australia) Adelaide City	
18	MF	(Australia) Ahmad Elrich	(Australia) Central Coast Mariners	
21	MF	(Brazil) Felipe	(Poland) Wisla Krakow	
22	FW	(Australia) Royce Brownlie	(Australia) Peninsula Power	
26	MF	(Brazil) Fred	(United States) D.C. United	Loan expired
30	GK	(New Zealand) Jacob Spoonley	(New Zealand) Auckland City FC	

== Matches ==
=== 2008 Pre-Season Cup fixtures ===
Group B

Team	Pld	W	D	L	GF	GA	GD	Pts	Qualification
Wellington Phoenix	3	2	1	0	5	3	+2	7	Advances to final
Central Coast Mariners	3	2	0	1	5	2	+3	6	
Sydney FC	3	1	0	2	4	7	−3	3	
Queensland Roar	3	0	1	2	3	5	−2	1	

20 August 2008 Group stage	Wellington Phoenix	1–0	Central Coast Mariners	Westpac Stadium, Wellington
16:00 NZST	Daniel 72'	(0:0); Report		Attendance: 4,853

27 August 2008 Group stage	Queensland Roar	1–1	Wellington Phoenix	Stockland Park, Sunshine Coast
15:00 NZST	S. van Dijk 18'	(1:0); Report	74' A. Kwasnik	Attendance: 3,832

2 September 2008 Group stage	Sydney FC	2–3	Wellington Phoenix	WIN Stadium, Wollongong
16:00 NZST	A. Brosque 16'; I. Fyfe 39'	(2:0); Report	57' T. Hearfield; 62' S. Smeltz; 82' L. Gao	Attendance: 6,124

6 August 2008 Final	Wellington Phoenix	0–0 (a.e.t.)	Melbourne Victory	Westpac Stadium, Wellington
19:30 NZST		(7-8 pen); Report		Attendance: 9,208; Referee: (New Zealand) Peter O'Leary
	Penalties
	S. Smeltz (penalty missed); L. Bertos (penalty scored); T. Hearfield (penalty scored); V. Coveny (penalty scored); Daniel (penalty scored); M. Ferrante (penalty scored); J. McKain (penalty scored); R. Johnson (penalty scored); K. Dodd (penalty missed)		(penalty scored) R. Vargas; (penalty scored) T. Pondeljak; (penalty scored) J. López; (penalty missed) N. Ward; (penalty scored) C. Hernandez; (penalty scored) S. Ryall; (penalty scored) D. Allsopp; (penalty scored) M. Kemp; (penalty scored) E. Berger

=== 2008–09 Hyundai A-League fixtures ===
17 August 2008 Round 1	Wellington Phoenix	1–1	Queensland Roar	Westpac Stadium, Wellington
	S. Smeltz 51'; K. Dodd (yellow card) 52'; Daniel (yellow card) 55'; L. Bertos (yellow card) 56'	(0–0); Summary	46' C. Miller; (yellow card) 65' D. Dodd; (yellow card) 79' M. Zullo; (yellow card) 90' M. McKay	Attendance: 10,561; Referee: (Australia) Ben Williams

24 August 2008 Round 2	Wellington Phoenix	2–4	Melbourne Victory	Westpac Stadium, Wellington
	S. Smeltz 29', 65' (pen.); A. Durante (yellow card) 73'; M. Ferrante (yellow card) 81'	(1–2); Summary	16', 35' D. Allsopp; (yellow card) 20' (goal) 47' N. Fabiano; (yellow card) 56' E. Berger; 68' (pen.) K. Muscat	Attendance: 6,110; Referee: (Australia) Strebre Delovski

30 August 2008 Round 3	Adelaide United	3– 0	Wellington Phoenix	Hindmarsh Stadium, Adelaide
	L. Pantelis 15'; Cristiano 49', 60'	(1–0); Summary	(yellow card) 34' D. Mulligan; (yellow card) 40' L. Gao	Attendance: 7,832; Referee: (Australia) Matthew Breeze

14 September 2008 Round 4	Wellington Phoenix	0–0	Central Coast Mariners	Westpac Stadium, Wellington
	R. Johnson (yellow card) 5'; K. Dodd (yellow card) 18'; T. Hearfield (yellow card) 45'	(0–0); Summary	(yellow card) 50' J. Hutchinson; (yellow card) 54' P. Bojic	Attendance: 6,928; Referee: (Australia) Strebre Delovski

21 September 2008 Round 5	Perth Glory	1–0	Wellington Phoenix	Members Equity Stadium, Perth
	J. Harnwell (yellow card) 15'; N. Topor-Stanley (yellow card) 38'; E. Dadi 78' (pen.)	(0–0); Summary	(yellow card) 27' R. Johnson; (yellow card) 44' T. Lochhead; (yellow card) 77' J. McKain	Attendance: 4,433; Referee: (Australia) Strebre Delovski

28 September 2008 Round 6	Wellington Phoenix	2–1	Sydney FC	Westpac Stadium, Wellington
	S. Smeltz 42'; V. Coveny (yellow card) 48'; M. Muscat (yellow card) 68'; T. Brown 76'; A. Kwasnik (yellow card) 84'	(1–1); Summary	20' A. Brosque; (yellow card) 79' S. Musialik	Attendance: 6,729; Referee: (Australia) Chris Beath

6 October 2008 Round 7	Newcastle Jets	2–2	Wellington Phoenix	EnergyAustralia Stadium, Newcastle
	N. Spencer (yellow card) 19'; J. Håkansson (yellow card) 45'; T. Elrich (yellow card) 49' (goal) 59'; K. Patafta 68'	(0–0); Summary	52' (pen.), 89' (pen.) S. Smeltz	Attendance: 8,492; Referee: (Australia) Craig Zetter

19 October 2008 Round 8	Central Coast Mariners	0–1	Wellington Phoenix	Bluetongue Stadium, Gosford
	M. Jedinak (yellow card) 18'; M. Simon (yellow card) 60'	(0–0); Summary	53' K. Dodd; (yellow card) 62' J. McKain; (yellow card) 83' L. Gao	Attendance: 9,011; Referee: (Australia) Ben Williams

26 October 2008 Round 9	Wellington Phoenix	0–1	Queensland Roar	Westpac Stadium, Wellington
	T. Brown (yellow card) 24'; L. Gao (yellow card) 41'	(0–1); Summary	(yellow card) 30' D. Tiatto; 40'J. McCloughan; (yellow card) 51' S. van Dijk; (yellow card) 81' D. Dodd; (yellow card) 90' L. Reddy	Attendance: 6,543; Referee: (New Zealand) Peter O'Leary

2 November 2008 Round 10	Perth Glory	2–0	Wellington Phoenix	Members Equity Stadium, Perth
	N. Rukavytsya 15', 70'; N. Rizzo (yellow card) 88'	(1–0); Summary	(yellow card) 39' K. Dodd	Attendance: 7,228; Referee: (Australia) Chris Beath

7 November 2008 Round 11	Sydney FC	1–2	Wellington Phoenix	Sydney Football Stadium, Sydney
	S. Musialik 77'	(0–1); Summary	34' L. Bertos; 89' (pen.) S. Smeltz	Attendance: 12,856; Referee: (Australia) Craig Zetter

23 November 2008 Round 12	Wellington Phoenix	2–0	Newcastle Jets	Westpac Stadium, Wellington
	T. Lochhead (yellow card) 53'; K. Dodd (yellow card) 76'; S. Smeltz 79'; T. Hearfield 86'	(0–0); Summary	(red card) 29' J. Griffiths; (red card) 51' M. Milligan; (yellow card) 54' A. Griffiths	Attendance: 5,500; Referee: (Australia) Matthew Breeze

28 November 2008 Round 13	Wellington Phoenix	2–1	Melbourne Victory	Westpac Stadium, Wellington
	T. Brown 22'; J. McKain (yellow card) 23'; S. Smeltz 58' (yellow card) 58'; Fred (yellow card) 83'	(1–1); Summary	20' D. Allsopp; (yellow card) 42' G. Brebner	Attendance: 7,953; Referee: (Australia) Craig Zetter

5 December 2008 Round 14	Adelaide United	6–1	Wellington Phoenix	Hindmarsh Stadium, Adelaide
	S. Ognenovski 21'; Cristiano 42', 74'; Cássio 57', 70'; T. Dodd 90'	(2–0); Summary	56' Fred; (yellow card) 39' M. Ferrante; (yellow card) 53' J. McKain; (yellow card) 83' T. Hearfield	Attendance: 9,442; Referee: (Australia) Matthew Breeze

13 December 2008 Round 15	Wellington Phoenix	1–1	Perth Glory	Westpac Stadium, Wellington
	T. Brown 83'	(0–0); Summary	76' E. Dadi	Attendance: 6,362; Referee: (Australia) Strebre Delovski

19 December 2008 Round 16	Wellington Phoenix	1–0	Central Coast Mariners	Westpac Stadium, Wellington
	Smeltz 2' (yellow card) 62'; A. Durante (yellow card) 90'; T. Brown (yellow card) 90'	(1–0); Summary	(yellow card) 45' A. Caceres; (yellow card) 49' B. Porter; (yellow card) 52' D. Macallister	Attendance: 6,722; Referee: (Australia) Chris Beath

28 December 2008 Round 17	Queensland Roar	3–2	Wellington Phoenix	Suncorp Stadium, Brisbane
	M. McKay 39'; S. van Dijk 48'; J. McCloughan (yellow card) 63'; C. Moore (yellow card) 68'; T. Oar 90'	(1–1); Summary	11' (o.g.) L. DeVere; (yellow card) 37' (yellow-red card) 90' A. Durante; (yellow card) 45' T. Brown; 46' T. Hearfield; (yellow card) 86' M. Muscat; (yellow card) 87' J. McKain	Attendance: 13,115; Referee: (Australia) Ben Williams

4 January 2009 Round 18	Wellington Phoenix	3–0	Newcastle Jets	Westpac Stadium, Wellington
	B. Sigmund (yellow card) 53'; L. Bertos 62'; S. Smeltz 67', 86' (pen.)	(0–0); Summary		Attendance: 7,524; Referee: (Australia) Craig Zetter

11 January 2009 Round 19	Sydney FC	1–0	Wellington Phoenix	Sydney Football Stadium, Sydney
	T. McFlynn (yellow card) 24'; A. Brosque (yellow card) 64'; K. Danning 85'	(0–0); Summary	(yellow card) 32' M. Ferrante; (yellow card) 37' J. McKain; (red card) 64' T. Hearfield; (yellow card) 90' M. Muscat	Attendance: 9,605; Referee: (Australia) Ben Williams

18 January 2009 Round 20	Wellington Phoenix	1–1	Adelaide United	Westpac Stadium, Wellington
	J. McKain (yellow card) 14'; T. Brown (yellow card) 28' (yellow-red card) 51'; K. Barbarouses 31'; L. Bertos (yellow card) 51'	(1–1); Summary	9' P. Reid; (yellow card) 79' S. Jamieson; (yellow card) 84' J. Salley; (yellow card) 85' S. Ognenovski	Attendance: 8,241; Referee: (Australia) Chris Beath

23 January 2009 Round 21	Melbourne Victory	2–0	Wellington Phoenix	Etihad Stadium, Melbourne
	D. Allsopp (yellow card) 25'; K. Muscat 40' (pen.); N. Fabiano (yellow card) 82'; A. Thompson 89'	(1–0); Summary		Attendance: 28,905; Referee: (Australia) Strebre Delovski

=== Results by round ===
Round	1	2	3	4	5	6	7	8	9	10	11	12	13	14	15	16	17	18	19	20	21
Ground	H	H	A	H	A	H	A	A	H	A	A	H	H	A	H	H	A	H	A	H	A
Result	D	L	L	D	L	W	D	W	L	L	W	W	W	L	D	W	L	W	L	D	L
Position	2	8	8	7	8	7	7	7	7	8	6	6	5	6	5	5	5	5	5	5	6

Source: Matches
A = Away; H = Home; W = Win; D = Draw; L = Loss

=== League table ===
Pos	Team	Pld	W	D	L	GF	GA	GD	Pts	Qualification
1	Melbourne Victory (C)	21	12	2	7	39	27	+12	38	Qualification for 2010 AFC Champions League group stage and Finals series
2	Adelaide United	21	11	5	5	31	19	+12	38	Qualification for 2010 AFC Champions League group stage and Finals series
3	Queensland Roar	21	10	6	5	36	25	+11	36	Qualification for Finals series
4	Central Coast Mariners	21	7	7	7	35	32	+3	28	Qualification for Finals series
5	Sydney FC	21	7	5	9	33	32	+1	26	
6	Wellington Phoenix	21	7	5	9	23	31	−8	26	
7	Perth Glory	21	6	4	11	31	44	−13	22	
8	Newcastle Jets	21	4	6	11	21	39	−18	18	

Source: ultimatealeague.com
Rules for classification: 1) points; 2) goal difference; 3) number of goals scored.
(C) Champions

== Statistics ==
=== Appearances ===
Rank	Player	Minutes played by round																					Total				
Rank	Player	1	2	3	4	5	6	7	8	9	10	11	12	13	14	15	16	17	18	19	20	21	App.	GS	Substituted on	Substituted off	Min.
1	(New Zealand) Tony Lochhead	90	90	90	90	90	90	90	90	90	90	90	90	90	(substituted off) 63	90	90	90	90	90	90	90	21	21	0	1	1,863
2	(New Zealand) Shane Smeltz	90	90		90	90	90	90	90	90	90	90	90	(substituted off) 83	90	90	90	90	(substituted off) 89	90	90	90	20	20	0	2	1,792
3	(Australia) Michael Ferrante	90	90	90		90	(substituted on) 21	(substituted on) 24	(substituted on) 26		(substituted on) 23	90	90	(substituted off) 81	90	(substituted off) 73	(substituted off) 75	(substituted off) 61	(substituted off) 77	(substituted off) 80	(substituted on) 10	90	19	14	5	6	1,181
4	(Australia) Jon McKain	90	90	90	90	90			90	90	90	90	90	90	90	90	90	90		90	(substituted off) 88	(substituted off) 78	18	18	0	2	1,606
5	(Australia) Karl Dodd	(substituted off) 89		(substituted on) 16	(substituted off) 87		90	90	90	90	90	90	90			(substituted on) 22	90	90	90	90	90	90	17	15	2	2	1,384
5	(New Zealand) Tim Brown				(substituted on) 3	(substituted on) 6	90	90	90	90	90	90	90	90	(substituted off) 72	90	90	90	90	90	51		17	15	2	1	1,302
5	(Brazil) Daniel	(substituted off) 72	(substituted off) 61	(substituted on) 29	(substituted off) 72	90		(substituted on) 18		(substituted on) 16	(substituted on) 18		(substituted on) 16	(substituted on) 2	(substituted on) 18	(substituted on) 17	(substituted on) 24		90	(substituted on) 44	(substituted off) 74	(substituted off) 67	17	7	10	5	728
8	(Australia) Andrew Durante	90	90	90	90	90		90	90	90	90			90	90	90	90	90		(substituted off) 46		(substituted on) 8	16	15	1	1	1,314
8	(New Zealand) Leo Bertos	90		90					(substituted on) 10	(substituted on) 44	(substituted off) 72	(substituted off) 89	90	90	90	90	90	90	90	90	90	90	16	14	2	2	1,125
10	(New Zealand) Ben Sigmund				(substituted on) 18	(substituted on) 5	90	(substituted off) 66	90	90	90	90	90	90	90	(substituted off) 68			90		90	90	15	13	2	2	1,147
11	(Australia) Manny Muscat	90	(substituted off) 74				90					90	(substituted off) 69	90	90	90	90	90	90	90	90	90	14	14	0	2	1,223
11	(Australia) Troy Hearfield	(substituted on) 18	90	90	(substituted off) 74	(substituted off) 70						(substituted off) 78	(substituted on) 21	(substituted on) 7	(substituted on) 27	90	(substituted off) 66	(substituted off) 71	(substituted off) 89	64			14	10	4	7	855
13	(New Zealand) Glen Moss	90	90	90	90	90									(substituted on) 44	90	90	90	90	90	90	90	13	12	1	0	1,124
14	(Australia) Adam Kwasnik	90	90	(substituted off) 55		(substituted on) 20	90	(substituted off) 72	(substituted off) 80	(substituted off) 46								(substituted on) 19	(substituted on) 1		(substituted on) 16	(substituted on) 23	12	7	5	4	602
15	(New Zealand) Jeremy Christie		(substituted on) 16				(substituted on) 21	(substituted on) 24						(substituted on) 9			(substituted on) 15	(substituted on) 29	(substituted on) 13	(substituted on) 10	(substituted on) 2	(substituted on) 12	10	0	10	0	151
16	(New Zealand) Mark Paston						90	90	90	90	90	90	90	90	(substituted off) 46								9	9	0	1	766
16	(New Zealand) Vaughan Coveny		(substituted on) 29	(substituted on) 35	90		(substituted off) 69	(substituted off) 66	(substituted off) 64	(substituted off) 74	(substituted off) 66	(substituted on) 1											9	6	3	5	494
18	(China) Leilei Gao			(substituted off) 61	(substituted on) 16	90	(substituted off) 69	90	90	90	(substituted off) 67												8	7	1	3	573
19	(Australia) Richard Johnson	(substituted on) 1	90	(substituted off) 74	90	(substituted off) 84	90	90															7	6	1	2	519
20	(New Zealand) Kosta Barbarouses										(substituted on) 24	(substituted on) 12							(substituted on) 1		(substituted off) 80	(substituted off) 82	5	2	3	2	199
21	(New Zealand) David Mulligan			90	90	(substituted off) 85																	3	3	0	1	265
21	(Brazil) Fred												(substituted off) 74	(substituted off) 88	90								3	3	0	2	252
23	(New Zealand) Greg Draper																						0	0	0	0	0
23	(Australia) Vince Lia																						0	0	0	0	0

Player started Player subbed in Player suspended Player injured

=== Goal scorers ===
Rank	Player	Goals by round																					Total
Rank	Player	1	2	3	4	5	6	7	8	9	10	11	12	13	14	15	16	17	18	19	20	21	Total
1	(New Zealand) Shane Smeltz	1	2				1	2				1	1	1			1		2				12
2	(New Zealand) Tim Brown						1							1		1							3
3	(Australia) Troy Hearfield												1					1					2
3	(New Zealand) Leo Bertos											1							1				2
5	(Brazil) Fred														1								1
5	(Australia) Karl Dodd								1														1
5	(New Zealand) Kosta Barbarouses																				1		1
5	Own goal																	1					1

Goal scored from penalty kick 2 goals scored from penalty kick

=== Goal assists ===
Rank	Player	Assists by round																					Total
Rank	Player	1	2	3	4	5	6	7	8	9	10	11	12	13	14	15	16	17	18	19	20	21	Total
1	(New Zealand) Leo Bertos								1				1	1			1	1			1		6
2	(Australia) Troy Hearfield												1						2				3
3	(Brazil) Daniel	1														1							2
3	(New Zealand) Tony Lochhead		1				1																2
3	(Australia) Jon McKain		1												1								2
6	(New Zealand) Tim Brown											1											1
6	(New Zealand) Vaughan Coveny							1															1
6	(China) Leilei Gao							1															1
6	(New Zealand) Ben Sigmund																		1				1
6	(New Zealand) Shane Smeltz																	1					1

=== Discipline ===
Rank	Player	Cards by round																					Total		
Rank	Player	1	2	3	4	5	6	7	8	9	10	11	12	13	14	15	16	17	18	19	20	21	Yellow card	Yellow-red card	Red card
1	(Australia) Jon McKain					Yellow card			Yellow card					Yellow card	Yellow card			Yellow card		Yellow card	Yellow card		7		
2	(Australia) Troy Hearfield				Yellow card										Yellow card					Red card			2		1
2	(New Zealand) Tim Brown									Yellow card							Yellow card	Yellow card			Yellow-red card		3	1	
2	(Australia) Karl Dodd	Yellow card			Yellow card		Yellow card				Yellow card		Yellow card										5		
5	(Australia) Andrew Durante		Yellow card														Yellow card	Yellow-red card					2	1	
6	(Australia) Michael Ferrante		Yellow card												Yellow card					Yellow card			3		
6	(China) Leilei Gao			Yellow card					Yellow card	Yellow card													3		
6	(Australia) Manny Muscat						Yellow card											Yellow card		Yellow card			3		
9	(New Zealand) Leo Bertos	Yellow card																			Yellow card		2		
9	(New Zealand) Tony Lochhead					Yellow card							Yellow card										2		
9	(Australia) Richard Johnson				Yellow card	Yellow card																	2		
9	(New Zealand) Shane Smeltz													Yellow card			Yellow card						2		
13	(New Zealand) Vaughan Coveny						Yellow card																1		
13	(Brazil) Daniel	Yellow card																					1		
13	(New Zealand) David Mulligan			Yellow card																			1		
13	(New Zealand) Ben Sigmund																		Yellow card				1		
13	(Australia) Adam Kwasnik						Yellow card																1		
13	(Brazil) Fred													Yellow card									1		

=== Goal times ===
Times in which goals have been scored in the 2008–09 season
nth Min.	Goals for Wellington Phoenix	Goals against Wellington Phoenix
01-05	1	0
06-10	0	1
11-15	1	2
16-20	0	3
21-25	1	1
26-30	1	0
31-35	2	1
36-40	0	3
41-45	1	1
46-50	1	4
51-55	3	0
56-60	2	3
61-65	2	0
66-70	1	4
71-75	0	1
76-80	2	3
81-85	1	1
86-90	4	3

=== Home attendance ===
Date	Round	Attendance	Opposition	Stadium
17 August 2008	Round 1	10,516	Queensland Roar	Westpac Stadium
24 August 2008	Round 2	6,110	Melbourne Victory	Westpac Stadium
14 September 2008	Round 4	6,926	Central Coast Mariners	Westpac Stadium
28 September 2008	Round 6	6,729	Sydney FC	Westpac Stadium
26 October 2008	Round 9	6,543	Queensland Roar	Westpac Stadium
23 November 2008	Round 12	5,500	Newcastle Jets	Westpac Stadium
28 November 2008	Round 13	7,953	Melbourne Victory	Westpac Stadium
14 December 2008	Round 15	6,362	Perth Glory	Westpac Stadium
19 December 2008	Round 16	6,722	Central Coast Mariners	Westpac Stadium
4 January 2009	Round 18	7,520	Newcastle Jets	Westpac Stadium
18 January 2009	Round 20	8,241	Adelaide United	Westpac Stadium
Total	79,122			
Average	7,193			

== Club ==
=== Technical staff ===
- First team coach: (New Zealand) Ricki Herbert
- Assistant coach: (New Zealand) Stu Jacobs
- First team Physiotherapist: (New Zealand) Adam Crump
- Masseur: (New Zealand) Dene Carroll
- Strength & conditioning coach: (England) Ed Baranowski

=== Kit ===
Supplier: Reebok
Sponsor(s): Sony

Home	Away

=== End-of-season awards ===
See also List of Wellington Phoenix FC end-of-season awards

- Sony Player of the Year: Leo Bertos
- Members' Player of the Year: Ben Sigmund
- Players' Player of the Year: Shane Smeltz
- Media Player of the Year: Shane Smeltz
- Golden Boot: Shane Smeltz - 12 goals
