= 2007–08 Wellington Phoenix FC season =

Wellington Phoenix FC
2007–08 season
- CEO: Tony Pignata
- Chairman: Terry Serepisos
- Manager: Ricki Herbert
- A-League: 8th
- Preseason Cup: 6th
- Finals: Did not qualify
- Top goalscorer: Shane Smeltz; 9 Goals
- Highest home attendance: 18,345 v Adelaide; 30 November 2007
- Lowest home attendance: 8,032 v Perth; 7 December 2007
Home colours	Away colours

The 2007–08 A-League season was the inaugural season for the Wellington Phoenix, who replaced the New Zealand Knights.

== Players ==
=== First team squad ===
Note: Flags indicate national team as defined under FIFA eligibility rules; some limited exceptions apply. Players may hold more than one non-FIFA nationality.

No.	Pos.	Nation	Player
1	GK	NZL	Mark Paston
2	DF	NZL	Jeremy Christie
3	DF	NZL	Tony Lochhead
4	DF	BRA	Cleberson
5	DF	AUS	Karl Dodd
6	MF	NZL	Tim Brown (Vice-Captain)
7	DF	AUS	Ross Aloisi (Captain)
8	FW	NZL	Vaughan Coveny
9	FW	NZL	Shane Smeltz
10	MF	AUS	Michael Ferrante
11	MF	BRA	Daniel
12	MF	AUS	Richard Johnson

No.	Pos.	Nation	Player
13	DF	NZL	Steven Old
14	DF	AUS	Steven O'Dor
15	MF	BRA	George
16	DF	AUS	Kristian Rees
17	MF	AUS	Vince Lia
18	DF	AUS	Ahmad Elrich
19	FW	NZL	Greg Draper
20	GK	NZL	Glen Moss
21	MF	BRA	Felipe
22	FW	AUS	Royce Brownlie
23	FW	NZL	Kosta Barbarouses
30	GK	NZL	Jacob Spoonley

=== Transfers ===
==== In ====
No.	Pos.	Player	From	Notes
1	GK	(New Zealand) Mark Paston	New Zealand Knights	
2	DF	(New Zealand) Jeremy Christie	(Australia) Perth Glory	
3	DF	(New Zealand) Tony Lochhead	(United States) New England Revolution	
4	DF	(Brazil) Cleberson	(Brazil) Cabofriense	
5	DF	(Australia) Karl Dodd	(Scotland) Falkirk FC	
6	MF	(New Zealand) Tim Brown	(Australia) Newcastle Jets	
7	DF	(Australia) Ross Aloisi	(Australia) Adelaide United	
8	FW	(New Zealand) Vaughan Coveny	(Australia) Newcastle Jets	
9	FW	(New Zealand) Shane Smeltz	(England) Halifax Town	
10	MF	(Australia) Michael Ferrante	(Australia) Melbourne Victory	
11	MF	(Brazil) Daniel	(Brazil) Madureira	
12	MF	(Australia) Richard Johnson	New Zealand Knights	
13	DF	(New Zealand) Steven Old	(Australia) Newcastle Jets	
14	DF	(Australia) Steven O'Dor	New Zealand Knights	
15	MF	(Brazil) George	(Venezuela) Carabobo	
16	DF	(Australia) Kristian Rees	(Australia) Whittlesea Zebras	Short-term contract
17	MF	(Australia) Vince Lia	(Australia) Melbourne Victory	
18	MF	(Australia) Ahmad Elrich	(England) Fulham FC	
19	FW	(New Zealand) Greg Draper	(New Zealand) Canterbury United	
20	GK	(New Zealand) Glen Moss	(Romania) Dinamo Bucharest	
21	MF	(Brazil) Felipe	(Croatia) Hajduk Split	
22	FW	(Australia) Royce Brownlie	(England) Swindon Town	
23	FW	(New Zealand) Kosta Barbarouses	(New Zealand) Team Wellington	
30	GK	(New Zealand) Jacob Spoonley	(New Zealand) Auckland City FC	

== Matches ==
=== 2007 Pre-season Cup fixtures ===
Group B
Pos	Team	Pld	W	D	L	GF	GA	GD	BP	Pts
1	Central Coast Mariners	3	2	1	0	6	1	+5	3	10
2	Queensland Roar	3	1	2	0	3	2	+1	1	6
3	Wellington Phoenix	3	1	0	2	4	4	0	2	5
4	Sydney FC	3	0	1	2	0	6	−6	0	1

14 July 2007 Group Stage	Central Coast Mariners	2–0	Wellington Phoenix	Bluetongue Stadium, Gosford
	A. Wilkinson 3'; A. Kwasnik 30'	Report		Attendance: 8,000; Referee: (Australia) Srebre Delovski

22 July 2007 Group Stage	Wellington Phoenix	3–0	Sydney FC	Westpac Stadium, Wellington
	S. Smeltz 13' 89' (pen); M. Rudan 14' (o.g.)	Report		Attendance: 6,039; Referee: (New Zealand) Peter O'Leary

27 July 2007 Group Stage	Wellington Phoenix	1–2	Queensland Roar	Queen Elizabeth II Park, Christchurch
	S. Old 46'	Report	40' S. Lynch; 48' S. Ognenovski	Attendance: 4,081; Referee: (New Zealand) Michael Hester

4 August 2007 Play-offs	Melbourne Victory	1–2	Wellington Phoenix	Olympic Park Stadium, Melbourne
	K. Dodd 34' (o.g.)	Report	53' S. Smeltz; 87' Daniel	Attendance: 4,100; Referee: (Australia) Kevin Docherty

10 August 2007 5th Place Play-off	Wellington Phoenix	0–0	Newcastle Jets	Westpac Stadium, Wellington
		(2–4 pen.); Report		Attendance: 5,174; Referee: (New Zealand) Michael Hester
	Penalties
	S. Smeltz (penalty missed); R. Aloisi (penalty scored); J. Christie (penalty scored); R. Johnson (penalty missed)		(penalty scored) J. Griffiths; (penalty scored) M. Bridge; (penalty scored) M. Thompson; (penalty scored) T. Elrich

=== 2007–08 Hyundai A-League fixtures ===
26 August 2007 Round 1	Wellington Phoenix	2–2	Melbourne Victory	Westpac Stadium, Wellington
	S. Old (yellow card) 8'; Cleberson (yellow card) 18'; Daniel (yellow card) 63' (goal) 79'; R. Aloisi (yellow card) 70'; S. Smeltz 84'	(0–1); Summary	19' (pen.) (yellow card) 77' K. Muscat; (yellow card) 20' G. Brebner; (yellow card) 25' L. Milicevic; (yellow card) 39' (goal) 60' D. Allsopp; (yellow card) 89' J. Keenan	Attendance: 14,421; Referee: (Australia) Mark Shield

31 August 2007 Round 2	Central Coast Mariners	3–0	Wellington Phoenix	Bluetongue Stadium, Gosford
	N. Mrdja 9', 35'; A. Kwasnik 13'; J. Hutchinson (yellow card) 63'; T. Vidmar (yellow card) 90'	(3–0); Summary	(yellow card) 29' Daniel; (yellow card) 41' M. Ferrante; (yellow card) 77' K. Dodd	Attendance: 9,052; Referee: (Australia) Peter Green

9 September 2007 Round 3	Wellington Phoenix	0–1	Newcastle Jets	Westpac Stadium, Wellington
	Felipe (yellow card) 53'; K. Dodd (yellow card) 86'	(0–0); Summary	(yellow card) 6' A. Griffiths; (yellow card) 86' A. D'Apuzzo; 77' M. Thompson	Attendance: 11,478; Referee: (New Zealand) Peter O'Leary

14 September 2007 Round 4	Sydney FC	1–2	Wellington Phoenix	Sydney Football Stadium, Sydney
	A. Casey 6'; M. Rudan (yellow card) 56'; B. Šantalab (yellow card) 65'; R. Zadkovich (yellow card) 85'; D. Zdrilic (yellow card) 89'	(1–2); Summary	8' Felipe; 29' (pen.) (yellow card) 30' Daniel; (yellow card) 85' R. Aloisi; (yellow card) 85' G. Moss	Attendance: 11,491; Referee: (Australia) Matthew Breeze

22 September 2007 Round 5	Wellington Phoenix	2–2	Adelaide United	Westpac Stadium, Wellington
	Felipe 65'; S. Smeltz 87'; R. Aloisi (yellow card) 88'	(0–0); Summary	70' Diego; 78' B. Djite	Attendance: 12,127; Referee: (Australia) Ben Williams

30 September 2007 Round 6	Wellington Phoenix	4–1	Perth Glory	Westpac Stadium, Wellington
	R. Aloisi 14'; S. Smeltz 42'; V. Coveny 55'; R. Johnson (yellow card) 62'; Daniel (yellow card) 63'; T. Lochhead 83'; T. Brown (yellow card) 84'	(2–1); Summary	10' B. Celeski; (yellow card) 46' (yellow-red card) 54' D. Djulbic; (yellow card) 47' S. Colosimo	Attendance: 10,127; Referee: (Australia) Peter Green

5 October 2007 Round 7	Queensland Roar	2–1	Wellington Phoenix	Suncorp Stadium, Brisbane
	M. Zullo 4' (yellow card) 62'; Marcinho (yellow card) 26'; R. Kruse 45+1'; Reinaldo (yellow card) 90'	(2–0); Summary	(yellow card) 88' K. Dodd; (yellow card) 90' T. Lochhead; 90+5' S. Smeltz	Attendance: 12,458; Referee: (Australia) Craig Zetter

14 October 2007 Round 8	Newcastle Jets	2–1	Wellington Phoenix	EnergyAustralia Stadium, Newcastle
	J. Holland 17'; J. Griffiths 40'; S. Laybutt (yellow card) 52'	(2–0); Summary	(yellow card) 37' V. Lia; (yellow card) 56' R. Johnson; (yellow card) 80' A. Elrich; 90+4' S. Old	Attendance: 11,947; Referee: (Australia) Ben Williams

21 October 2007 Round 9	Wellington Phoenix	1–2	Central Coast Mariners	Westpac Stadium, Wellington
	A. Elrich 24'; T. Brown (yellow card) 30'; Daniel (yellow card) 56'; T. Lochhead (yellow card) 57'; S. Smeltz (yellow card) 58'; K. Dodd (yellow card) 65'	(1–1); Summary	16' D. Heffernan; (yellow card) 83' N. Boogaard; 90+1' S. Petrovski	Attendance: 10,562; Referee: (Australia) Peter Green

28 October 2007 Round 10	Adelaide United	4–1	Wellington Phoenix	Hindmarsh Stadium, Adelaide
	D. Giraldi 5'; Cássio (yellow card) 24'; N. Burns 45+3'; L. Pantelis 50'; S. Spagnuolo 75'	(2–1); Summary	3' S. Smeltz; (yellow card) 83' V. Lia	Attendance: 11,740; Referee: (Australia) Simon Przydacz

2 November 2007 Round 11	Perth Glory	0–1	Wellington Phoenix	Members Equity Stadium, Perth
	S. Colosimo (yellow card) 11'; N. Topor-Stanley (yellow card) 68'	(0–1); Report; Summary	(yellow card) 13' V. Lia; 51' (yellow card) 74' Daniel; (yellow card) 78' R. Johnson; (yellow card) 85' J. Christie	Attendance: 7,105; Referee: (Australia) Simon Przydacz

11 November 2007 Round 12	Queensland Roar	3–0	Wellington Phoenix	Suncorp Stadium, Brisbane
	J. McCloughan (yellow card) 22'; Reinaldo 67' (pen.), 79'; Marcinho 83'	(0–0); Summary	(yellow card) 11' K. Dodd; (red card) 34' A. Elrich; (yellow card) 52' T. Lochhead; (yellow card) 90' J. Christie; (yellow card) 90' T. Brown	Attendance: 13,808; Referee: (Australia) Matthew Breeze

17 November 2007 Round 13	Wellington Phoenix	1–1	Sydney FC	Westpac Stadium, Wellington
	R. Aloisi 29'; S. Old (yellow card) 61' (yellow-red card) 90'; K. Rees (yellow card) 76'; V. Coveny (yellow card) 78'	(1–0); Summary	(yellow card) 27' (yellow-red card) 69' T. Popovic; 90+3' (pen.) U. Talay	Attendance: 8,062; Referee: (Australia) Peter Green

24 November 2007 Round 14	Melbourne Victory	1–1	Wellington Phoenix	Etihad Stadium, Melbourne
	K. Muscat (yellow card) 34' (yellow-red card) 45'; D. Allsopp 43'; L. Broxham (yellow card) 62'; A. Thompson (yellow card) 62'	(1–0); Summary	(yellow card) 42' M. Ferrante; 58' V. Lia	Attendance: 20,938; Referee: (Australia) Peter Green

30 November 2007 Round 15	Wellington Phoenix	1–2	Adelaide United	Westpac Stadium, Wellington
	Daniel 69' (pen.)	(0–1); Summary	9' P. Agostino; (yellow card) 50' (yellow-red card) 68' M. Susak; (yellow card) 58' Diego; (yellow card) 59' (goal) 79' L. Pantelis; (yellow card) 90' S. Ontong; (yellow card) 90' I. Erdogan	Attendance: 18,345; Referee: (Australia) Craig Zetter

7 December 2007 Round 16	Wellington Phoenix	3–0	Perth Glory	Westpac Stadium, Wellington
	S. Smeltz 29' (pen.), 72' (yellow card) 35'; Felipe 32'	(1–0); Summary	(red card) 34' N. Topor-Stanley; (yellow card) 35' M. Prentice; (yellow card) 37' D. Micevski; (yellow card) 66' H. Foxe; (red card) 73' J. Harnwell	Attendance: 8,039; Referee: (Australia) Strebre Delovski

14 December 2007 Round 17	Wellington Phoenix	1–1	Queensland Roar	Westpac Stadium, Wellington
	V. Coveny (yellow card) 15'; S. Smeltz 24'; A. Elrich (yellow card) 72'; Daniel (yellow card) 90'	(1–1); Summary	5' Reinaldo; (yellow card) 37' R. Kruse; (yellow card) 72' H. Seo	Attendance: 9,384; Referee: (Australia) Ben Williams

30 December 2007 Round 18	Newcastle Jets	2–3	Wellington Phoenix	EnergyAustralia Stadium, Newcastle
	M. Bridge 29' (pen.); S. Musialik (yellow card) 55'; S. Tunbridge 81'	(1–1); Summary	16' S. Smeltz; (yellow card) 28' G. Moss; 49' M. Ferrante; 51' K. Rees; (yellow card) 59' V. Lia; (yellow card) 84' T. Brown; (yellow card) 90' A. Elrich	Attendance: 15,107; Referee: (Australia) Strebre Delovski

4 January 2008 Round 19	Wellington Phoenix	0–2	Sydney FC	Westpac Stadium, Wellington
	K. Rees (yellow card) 14'; R. Johnson (yellow card) 80'; S. Smeltz (yellow card) 81'; T. Lochhead (yellow card) 85'; R. Aloisi (red card) 90'	(0–0); Summary	(yellow card) 26' U. Talay; 79' T. McFlynn; 83' A. Brosque	Attendance: 14,288; Referee: (Australia) Ben Williams

11 January 2008 Round 20	Melbourne Victory	3–0	Wellington Phoenix	Etihad Stadium, Melbourne
	C. Hernandez 31'; N. Ward 35'; K. Patafta 88'	(2–0); Summary	(yellow card) 54' T. Brown; (yellow card) 63' K. Dodd; (yellow card) 90' Felipe	Attendance: 25,489; Referee: (Australia) Peter Green

19 January 2008 Round 21	Central Coast Mariners	2–0	Wellington Phoenix	Bluetongue Stadium, Gosford
	M. Jedinak (yellow card) 22'; J. Aloisi 52'; A. Kwasnik 90+4'	(0–0); Summary	(yellow card) 41' J. Christie; (yellow card) 86' V. Lia	Attendance: 9,849; Referee: (Australia) Kevin Docherty

=== Exhibition match ===
1 December 2007	Wellington Phoenix (New Zealand)	1–4	(United States) Los Angeles Galaxy	Westpac Stadium, Wellington
	R. Aloisi 7'		17' C. Mathis; 45' L. Donovan; 48' C. Pavón; 77' (pen) D. Beckham	Attendance: 31,853; Referee: (New Zealand) Michael Hester

=== Results by round ===
Round	1	2	3	4	5	6	7	8	9	10	11	12	13	14	15	16	17	18	19	20	21
Ground	H	A	H	A	H	H	A	A	H	A	A	A	H	A	H	H	H	A	H	A	A
Result	D	L	L	W	D	W	L	L	L	L	W	L	D	D	L	W	D	W	L	L	L
Position	2	8	8	5	6	5	5	7	7	7	7	7	7	7	8	7	7	7	7	8	8

Source: Matches
A = Away; H = Home; W = Win; D = Draw; L = Loss

=== League table ===
Pos	Team	Pld	W	D	L	GF	GA	GD	Pts	Qualification
1	Central Coast Mariners	21	10	4	7	30	25	+5	34	Qualification for 2009 AFC Champions League group stage and Finals series (Note: First place qualifies for the 2009 AFC Champions League group stage. Winning the 2008 A-League Grand Final earns qualification for the 2009 AFC Champions League group stage, unless the Grand Final winners are also first place, in which case the Grand Final runner up qualifies.)
2	Newcastle Jets (C)	21	9	7	5	25	21	+4	34	Qualification for 2009 AFC Champions League group stage and Finals series
3	Sydney FC	21	8	8	5	28	24	+4	32	Qualification for 2008 Pan-Pacific Championship and Finals series
4	Queensland Roar	21	8	7	6	25	21	+4	31	Qualification for Finals series
5	Melbourne Victory	21	6	9	6	29	29	0	27	
6	Adelaide United	21	6	8	7	31	29	+2	26	
7	Perth Glory	21	4	8	9	27	34	−7	20	
8	Wellington Phoenix (Note: Wellington Phoenix cannot qualify for the AFC Champions League as they are not recognised as an AFC club.)	21	5	5	11	25	37	−12	20	

Source: ultimatealeague.com
Rules for classification: 1) points; 2) goal difference; 3) number of goals scored.
(C) Champions

== Statistics ==
=== Appearances ===
Rank	Player	Minutes played																					Total				
Rank	Player	1	2	3	4	5	6	7	8	9	10	11	12	13	14	15	16	17	18	19	20	21	App.	GS	Substituted on	Substituted off	Min.
1	(New Zealand) Glen Moss	90	90	90	90	90	90	90	90	90		90	90	90	90	90	90	90	90	90	90	90	20	20	0	0	1,800
2	(Australia) Karl Dodd	90	90	90	90	90	90	90	90	90		90	90	90	90	90	90	90		90	90	90	19	19	0	0	1,710
2	(New Zealand) Shane Smeltz	90	90	90	90	90	90	90		90	90	90	90		90	90	90	90	90	90	90	90	19	19	0	0	1,710
4	(New Zealand) Tony Lochhead	90	90	90	(substituted off) 82	90	90	90		90	90	90	90		90	90	90	90	90	90		90	18	18	0	1	1,612
4	(Australia) Michael Ferrante	90	90	90	90	90	(substituted on) 19	90	(substituted off) 45				(substituted on) 33	90	90	90	90	90	90	90	90	90	18	16	2	1	1,537
6	(Brazil) Daniel	90	90	(substituted off) 48	90	90	90		90	90	(substituted off) 84	(substituted off) 80	(substituted off) 67	(substituted off) 86	(substituted off) 87	90	(substituted on) 8	(substituted on) 12			(substituted on) 30		17	14	3	6	1,222
6	(Brazil) Felipe	(substituted on) 26	(substituted on) 36	(substituted off) 82	(substituted off) 62	(substituted off) 86	(substituted off) 71	(substituted off) 41			(substituted off) 56			90	90	90	(substituted off) 67	(substituted off) 78	(substituted off) 65	(substituted off) 77	90	(substituted on) 8	17	14	3	10	1,115
6	(New Zealand) Vaughan Coveny	(substituted off) 76	(substituted off) 62	(substituted on) 42	(substituted on) 28	(substituted on) 4	(substituted off) 77	(substituted off) 70	(substituted off) 75			(substituted on) 10		90	(substituted on) 11	(substituted on) 25	(substituted off) 83	90	(substituted off) 89	90	(substituted off) 65		17	11	6	8	987
9	(New Zealand) Jeremy Christie	(substituted off) 64	90	90	90	90	90	90		90	90	90	90		(substituted on) 3		(substituted on) 4		(substituted on) 7	(substituted on) 8		(substituted off) 83	16	12	4	2	1,069
10	(Australia) Richard Johnson			90	90	(substituted off) 86	(substituted off) 86	90	90		(substituted on) 6	90	(substituted off) 77	(substituted off) 75			(substituted on) 23	(substituted on) 5	(substituted on) 25	(substituted off) 82			14	10	4	5	915
11	(Australia) Vince Lia								(substituted off) 75	90	90	90	90	90	(substituted off) 79	90	90	90	(substituted off) 83		90	90	13	13	0	3	1,137
11	(Australia) Ross Aloisi	90	90	90	90	90	90	90	90	90	(substituted off) 84			(substituted off) 77						(substituted on) 8		(substituted off) 62	13	12	1	3	1,041
11	(Australia) Steven O'Dor		90	90	90	90	90	(substituted off) 49	90	90	90	(substituted off) 80		(substituted on) 4					(substituted on) 1		90		13	11	2	2	1,034
11	(Australia) Ahmad Elrich								(substituted on) 45	(substituted off) 86	90	(substituted off) 79	34		90	90	(substituted off) 86	(substituted off) 85	90	(substituted off) 82	(substituted off) 60	(substituted on) 7	13	11	2	7	924
15	(New Zealand) Steven Old	90			(substituted on) 8			(substituted on) 41	90		90	(substituted on) 10	90	89			90	90	90	90			12	9	3	1	868
16	(New Zealand) Tim Brown						(substituted on) 13	(substituted on) 20		90	(substituted on) 6	90	90		90	(substituted off) 65			90		90	90	11	8	3	1	734
17	(Australia) Kristian Rees													90	90	90	90	90	90	90	90	90	9	9	0	0	810
18	(Australia) Royce Brownlie	(substituted on) 14	(substituted on) 28	(substituted on) 8					(substituted on) 15			(substituted on) 11	(substituted on) 13	(substituted on) 15						(substituted on) 13			8	0	8	0	117
19	(Brazil) George					(substituted on) 4	(substituted on) 4	(substituted on) 49	(substituted on) 15														4	0	4	0	72
20	(Brazil) Cleberson	90	(substituted off) 54						90														3	3	0	1	234
20	(New Zealand) Kosta Barbarouses									(substituted on) 4				(substituted on) 13								90	3	1	2	0	107
21	(New Zealand) Greg Draper																				(substituted on) 25	(substituted on) 28	2	0	2	0	53
22	(New Zealand) Mark Paston										90												1	1	0	0	90
23	(New Zealand) Jacob Spoonley																						0	0	0	0	0

Player started Player subbed in Player suspended Player injured

=== Goal scorers ===
Rank	Player	Goals by round																					Total
Rank	Player	1	2	3	4	5	6	7	8	9	10	11	12	13	14	15	16	17	18	19	20	21	Total
1	(New Zealand) Shane Smeltz	1				1	1	1			1						2	1	1				9
2	(Brazil) Daniel	1			1							1				1							4
3	(Brazil) Felipe				1	1											1						3
4	(Australia) Ross Aloisi						1							1									2
5	(New Zealand) Steven Old								1														1
5	(New Zealand) Tony Lochhead						1																1
5	(New Zealand) Vaughan Coveny						1																1
5	(Australia) Ahmad Elrich									1													1
5	(Australia) Vince Lia														1								1
5	(Australia) Michael Ferrante																		1				1
5	(Australia) Kristian Rees																		1				1

A goal was scored from a penalty kick

=== Goal assists ===
Rank	Player	Assists by round																					Total
Rank	Player	1	2	3	4	5	6	7	8	9	10	11	12	13	14	15	16	17	18	19	20	21	Total
1	(New Zealand) Vaughan Coveny						1									1	1		1				4
1	(Brazil) Daniel						2			1				1									4
3	(New Zealand) Shane Smeltz	1															1		1				3
4	(Australia) Vince Lia										1						1						2
4	(New Zealand) Tony Lochhead					1	1																2
6	(Australia) Ross Aloisi				1																		1
6	(New Zealand) Tim Brown											1											1
6	(New Zealand) Jeremy Christie					1																	1
6	(Australia) Karl Dodd																	1					1
6	(Australia) Ahmad Elrich																		1				1
6	(Brazil) Felipe														1								1
6	(Australia) Michael Ferrante	1																					1
6	(Brazil) George							1															1
6	(Australia) Steven O'Dor								1														1

=== Discipline ===
Rank	Player	Cards by round																					Total		
Rank	Player	1	2	3	4	5	6	7	8	9	10	11	12	13	14	15	16	17	18	19	20	21	Yellow card	Yellow-red card	Red card
1	(Brazil) Daniel	Yellow card	Yellow card		Yellow card		Yellow card			Yellow card		Yellow card						Yellow card					7		
2	(Australia) Ross Aloisi	Yellow card			Yellow card	Yellow card														Red card			3		1
2	(Australia) Karl Dodd		Yellow card	Yellow card				Yellow card		Yellow card			Yellow card								Yellow card		6		
4	(Australia) Ahmad Elrich								Yellow card				Red card					Yellow card	Yellow card				3		1
5	(New Zealand) Tim Brown						Yellow card			Yellow card			Yellow card						Yellow card		Yellow card		5		
5	(Australia) Vince Lia								Yellow card		Yellow card	Yellow card							Yellow card			Yellow card	5		
7	(New Zealand) Jeremy Christie											Yellow card	Yellow card			Yellow card						Yellow card	4		
7	(Australia) Richard Johnson						Yellow card		Yellow card			Yellow card								Yellow card			4		
7	(New Zealand) Tony Lochhead							Yellow card		Yellow card			Yellow card							Yellow card			4		
10	(New Zealand) Steven Old	Yellow card												Yellow-red card									1	1	
10	(New Zealand) Shane Smeltz									Yellow card							Yellow card			Yellow card			3		
12	(New Zealand) Vaughan Coveny													Yellow card				Yellow card					2		
12	(Brazil) Felipe			Yellow card																	Yellow card		2		
12	(Australia) Michael Ferrante		Yellow card												Yellow card								2		
12	(New Zealand) Glen Moss				Yellow card														Yellow card				2		
12	(Australia) Kristian Rees													Yellow card						Yellow card			2		
17	(Brazil) Cleberson	Yellow card																					1		

=== Goal times ===
Times in which goals have been scored in the 2007–08 season
nth Min.	Goals for Wellington Phoenix	Goals against Wellington Phoenix
01-05	1	3
06-10	1	4
11–15	1	1
16–20	1	3
21–25	2	0
26–30	3	1
31–35	1	3
36–40	0	1
41–45	1	3
46–50	1	1
51–55	3	1
56–60	1	1
61–65	1	0
66–70	1	2
71–75	1	1
76–80	1	5
81–85	2	3
86–90	3	4

=== Home attendance ===
Date	Round	Attendance	Opposition	Stadium
26 August 2007	Round 1	14,421	Melbourne Victory	Westpac Stadium
9 September 2007	Round 3	11,478	Newcastle Jets	Westpac Stadium
22 September 2007	Round 5	12,127	Adelaide United	Westpac Stadium
30 September 2007	Round 6	10,127	Perth Glory	Westpac Stadium
21 October 2007	Round 9	10,560	Central Coast Mariners	Westpac Stadium
17 November 2007	Round 13	8,062	Sydney FC	Westpac Stadium
30 November 2007	Round 15	18,345	Adelaide United	Westpac Stadium
1 December 2007	Exhibition	31,853	(United States) Los Angeles Galaxy	Westpac Stadium
7 December 2007	Round 16	8,032	Perth Glory	Westpac Stadium
14 December 2007	Round 17	9,384	Queensland Roar	Westpac Stadium
4 January 2008	Round 19	14,288	Sydney FC	Westpac Stadium
Total	116,824 excl. exhibition match			
Average	11,682 excl. exhibition match			

== Club ==
=== Kit ===
Supplier: Reebok
Sponsor(s): Sony

Pre-Season	Home	Away

=== End-of-season awards ===
See also List of Wellington Phoenix FC end-of-season awards

- Sony Player of the Year: Shane Smeltz
- Players' Player of the Year: Shane Smeltz
- Media Player of the Year: Shane Smeltz
- Golden Boot: Shane Smeltz – 9 goals
