= 2007 Lunar New Year Cup =

Tournament details
- Host country: Hong Kong
- Dates: 2 – 5 February
- Teams: 4
- Venue: 1 (in 1 host city)

Final positions
- Champions: Jamaica (1st title)

Tournament statistics
- Matches played: 4
- Goals scored: 8 (2 per match)
- Top scorer: (Hong Kong) Keith Gumbs (2 goals)

The 2007 Lunar New Year Cup (formerly known as the Carlsberg Cup) was a football tournament held in Hong Kong on the first and fourth day of the Chinese New Year of the Pig (2 February and 5 February 2007).

== Participating teams ==
- China Olympic Team
- Australia Olympic Team
- Hong Kong League XI
- Jamaica Olympic Team

== Squads ==
=== Australia Olympic Team ===
The Australian squad was as follows.

- Head coach: Rob Baan
- Assistant coach: Graham Arnold
- Goalkeeper coach: Tony Franken
- Team manager: Gary Moretti
- Doctor: Marc Cesana
- Equipment Manager: Dominic Rabsch
- Physiotherapist: Philip Coles
- Conditioner / Masseur: Paul Scott

No.	Pos.	Player	Date of birth (age)	Caps	Club
1	GK	Danny Vukovic	22 August 1988 (aged 18)		(Australia) Central Coast Mariners
18	GK	Tando Velaphi	17 April 1987 (aged 19)		(Australia) Perth SC
19	GK	Ben Kennedy	14 February 1987 (aged 20)		(Australia) Newcastle Jets
3	DF	Adrian Leijer	23 March 1986 (aged 20)		(Australia) Melbourne Victory
8	DF	Spase Dilevski	13 May 1985 (aged 21)		(Australia) Queensland Roar
13	DF	Robert Cornthwaite	24 October 1984 (aged 22)		(Australia) Adelaide United
14	DF	Ben Griffin	7 March 1986 (aged 20)		(Australia) Queensland Roar
20	DF	Nikolai Topor-Stanley	11 March 1985 (aged 21)		(Australia) Sydney FC
21	DF	Sebastian Ryall	18 July 1989 (aged 17)		(Australia) AIS
22	DF	Mark Milligan	4 August 1985 (aged 21)		(Australia) Sydney FC
2	MF	Ruben Zadkovich	23 May 1986 (aged 20)		(Australia) Sydney FC
5	MF	Vince Lia	18 March 1985 (aged 21)		(Australia) Melbourne Victory
6	MF	Stuart Musialik	29 March 1985 (aged 21)		(Australia) Newcastle Jets
7	MF	Kristian Sarkies	25 October 1986 (aged 20)		(Australia) Melbourne Victory
12	MF	Steven O'Dor	28 January 1987 (aged 20)		(Australia) New Zealand Knights
16	MF	Leigh Broxham	13 January 1988 (aged 19)		(Australia) Melbourne Victory
17	MF	Troy Hearfield	31 October 1987 (aged 19)		(Australia) Newcastle Jets
23	MF	Adam D'Apuzzo	20 October 1986 (aged 20)		(Australia) Newcastle Jets
4	FW	Nathan Burns	7 May 1988 (aged 18)		(Australia) Adelaide United
9	FW	Mark Bridge	7 November 1985 (aged 21)		(Australia) Newcastle Jets
10	FW	Dario Vidosic	8 April 1987 (aged 19)		(Australia) Queensland Roar
11	FW	Bruce Djite	25 March 1987 (aged 19)		(Australia) Adelaide United
15	FW	Jason Naidovski	19 July 1989 (aged 17)		(Australia) AIS

=== China Olympic Team ===
The Chinese squad was as follows.

- H.O.D.: Nan Yong
- Head coach: Ratomir Dujković
- Assistant coach: Aleksandar Tomic, Su Maozhen
- Goalkeeper coach: Stevan Mićić
- Team manager: Li Xiaoguang
- Administrator: Guo Bingyan, Hu Ping
- Coach: Jia Xiuquan
- Doctor: Zhang Peng, Yan Cheng

No.	Pos.	Player	Date of birth (age)	Caps	Club
12	GK	Zheng Cheng	8 January 1987 (aged 20)	0	(China) Wuhan Guanggu
16	GK	Zhang Lu	6 September 1987 (aged 19)	0	(China) Liaoning FC
2	DF	Zhao Ming	3 October 1987 (aged 19)	0	(China) Changsha Ginde
4	DF	Zhang Ke	20 March 1985 (aged 21)	0	(China) Changsha Ginde
13	DF	Lü Jianjun	1 August 1985 (aged 21)	0	(China) Dalian Yiteng
14	DF	Yuan Weiwei	25 November 1985 (aged 21)	0	(China) Shandong Luneng
15	DF	Dai Lin	28 November 1987 (aged 19)	0	(China) Liaoning FC
25	DF	Wan Houliang	25 February 1986 (aged 20)	0	(China) Xian Chanba
28	DF	Bai Lei	28 March 1987 (aged 19)	0	(China) Xiamen Lanshi
8	MF	Zhou Haibin	19 July 1985 (aged 21)	17	(China) Shandong Luneng
20	MF	Yu Hai	4 June 1987 (aged 19)	0	(Netherlands) Vitesse Arnhem
21	MF	Shen Longyuan	2 March 1985 (aged 21)	0	(China) Shanghai Shenhua
23	MF	Li Wei	18 March 1985 (aged 21)	0	(China) Shandong Luneng
27	MF	Dai Qinhua	9 February 1985 (aged 22)	0	(China) Changsha Ginde
9	FW	Jiang Ning	1 September 1986 (aged 20)	0	(China) Qingdao Zhongneng
11	FW	Zhu Ting	15 July 1985 (aged 21)	2	(China) Dalian Shide
19	FW	Yang Xu	12 February 1988 (aged 19)	0	(China) Liaoning FC
29	FW	Jiang Chen	24 June 1986 (aged 20)	0	(China) Tianjin Teda FC

=== Hong Kong League XI ===
The Hong Kong squad was as follows.

- Team manager: Steven Lo Kit Shing, Raymond Chow Man Leung
- Manager Assistant: Lee Yuen Wah
- Co-Ordinator: Tsang Wai Chung
- Coach: Casemiro Mior
- Assistant coach: Dejan Antonić

No.	Pos.	Player	Date of birth (age)	Caps	Club
1	GK	(Macau) Chan Domingos	11 September 1970 (aged 36)		(Hong Kong) Xiangxue Sun Hei
23	GK	(China) Zhang Chunhui	14 March 1983 (aged 23)		(Hong Kong) South China
3	DF	(Hong Kong) Gerard Guy Ambassa	21 September 1978 (aged 28)		(Hong Kong) Happy Valley
4	DF	(Serbia) Ivan Jević*	23 July 1975 (aged 31)		(Hong Kong) Kitchee
5	DF	(Hong Kong) Lee Wai Lun	7 March 1981 (aged 25)		(Hong Kong) Xiangxue Sun Hei
15	DF	(Hong Kong) Chan Wai Ho	24 April 1982 (aged 24)		(Hong Kong) Rangers
21	DF	(Hong Kong) Man Pei Tak	16 February 1982 (aged 25)		(Hong Kong) South China
33	DF	(Hong Kong) Cristiano Cordeiro	14 August 1973 (aged 33)		(Hong Kong) Xiangxue Sun Hei
6	MF	(Nigeria) Festus Baise	11 April 1980 (aged 26)		(Hong Kong) Citizen
8	MF	(Hong Kong) Cheung Sai Ho	27 August 1975 (aged 31)		(Hong Kong) Happy Valley
10	MF	(Cameroon) Wilfed Ndzedzeni Bamnjo	27 March 1980 (aged 26)		(Hong Kong) Kitchee
11	MF	(Hong Kong) Lee Kin Wo	20 October 1967 (aged 39)		(Hong Kong) Xiangxue Sun Hei
12	MF	(Brazil) Vandre Sagrillo Monteiro	3 July 1979 (aged 27)		(Hong Kong) Happy Valley
16	MF	(Hong Kong) Leung Chun Pong	1 October 1986 (aged 20)		(Hong Kong) Citizen
18	MF	(China) Li Haiqiang	3 May 1977 (aged 29)		(Hong Kong) South China
19	MF	(Brazil) Lico	20 January 1974 (aged 33)		(Hong Kong) Xiangxue Sun Hei
7	FW	(Hong Kong) Au Wai Lun	14 August 1971 (aged 35)		(Hong Kong) South China
20	FW	(Saint Kitts and Nevis) Keith Gumbs	12 September 1972 (aged 34)		(Hong Kong) Kitchee
25	FW	(Ghana) Christian Kwesi Annan	3 May 1978 (aged 28)		(Hong Kong) Wofoo Tai Po
28	FW	(Brazil) Tales Schutz	22 August 1981 (aged 25)		(Hong Kong) South China

Note: * Ivan Jević replaced Jaimes Mckee of HKFC who withdrew from the squad due to injury.

=== Jamaica Olympic Team ===
The Jamaican squad was a follows.

- H.O.D.: Linnel Mclean
- Technical director: Bora Milutinovic
- Coach: Wendell Downswell
- Team manager: Howard Bell
- Equipment Steward: Manley Burrowes
- Team doctor: Dr. Mark Sanderson

No.	Pos.	Player	Date of birth (age)	Caps	Club
13	GK	Allien Whittaker	19 June 1983 (aged 23)		Jamaica Defence Force
30	GK	Richard McCallum	24 April 1984 (aged 22)		(Jamaica) Waterhouse F.C.
3	DF	Dwayne Williams	4 November 1986 (aged 20)		(Jamaica) Reno F.C.
4	DF	Oneil Smith	4 May 1978 (aged 28)		(Jamaica) Harbour View F.C.
5	DF	Jermaine Taylor	14 January 1985 (aged 22)		(Jamaica) Harbour View F.C.
6	DF	Nicora Plummer	22 June 1987 (aged 19)		(Jamaica) Bull Bay F.C.
8	DF	Mario Swaby	6 November 1982 (aged 24)		(Jamaica) Portmore United
15	DF	Xavian Virgo	25 October 1985 (aged 21)		(Jamaica) Boys' Town F.C.
16	DF	Adrian Reid	10 March 1985 (aged 21)		(Jamaica) Portmore United
18	DF	Jeff Pearce	14 May 1987 (aged 19)		(Jamaica) Village United F.C.
7	MF	Mario Harrison	16 May 1985 (aged 21)		(Jamaica) Reno F.C.
12	MF	Demar Phillips	23 September 1983 (aged 23)		(Jamaica) Waterhouse F.C.
14	MF	Donald Stewart	30 September 1975 (aged 31)		(Jamaica) Harbour View F.C.
17	MF	Donovan Davis	16 July 1985 (aged 21)		(Jamaica) St Georges
22	MF	Nicholy Finlayson	19 December 1985 (aged 21)		(Jamaica) Reno F.C.
24	MF	Lovel Palmer	30 August 1984 (aged 22)		(Jamaica) Harbour View F.C.
10	FW	Kavin Bryan	7 February 1984 (aged 23)		(Jamaica) Harbour View F.C.
19	FW	Fabian Taylor	13 April 1980 (aged 26)		(Jamaica) Harbour View
21	FW	Horace Howell	16 August 1985 (aged 21)		(Jamaica) Tivoli Gardens F.C.
25	FW	Steven Morrissey	25 July 1986 (aged 20)		(Jamaica) Portmore United

== Results ==
All times given in Hong Kong Time (UTC+8).

=== Semi-finals ===
2 February 2007
15:15

Hong Kong League XI	1–1	Jamaica Olympic Team
Bamnjo (yellow card) 18'; Gumbs 79'; Lee (yellow card) 81'	(Report)	Stewart (yellow card) 24'; F. Taylor 41'
Penalties
Ambassa (penalty scored); Gumbs (penalty scored); Lico (penalty missed); Cheung (penalty scored)	3–5	(penalty scored) Finlayson; (penalty scored) Reid; (penalty scored) J. Taylor; (penalty scored) Phillips; (penalty scored) Palmer

Hong Kong Stadium, Hong Kong
Attendance: 14,633

2 February 2007
17:15

China Olympic Team	2–0	Australia Olympic Team
Cornthwaite 7' (o.g.); L. Dai (yellow card) 26'; Yuan (yellow card) 72'; Jiang 86'	(Report)	O'Dor (yellow card) 9'; Dilevski (yellow card) 29'; Topor-Stanley (yellow card) 42'; Ryall (yellow card) 79'

Hong Kong Stadium, Hong Kong
Attendance: 14,633

=== Third place match ===
5 February 2007
18:00

Hong Kong League XI	2–2	Australia Olympic Team
Baise 70'; Man (yellow card) 81'; Gumbs 82' (pen.)	(Report)	Topor-Stanley (yellow card) 25'; Burns 37'; Djite 66'; O'Dor (yellow card) 81'; Sarkies (yellow card) 86'
Penalties
Ambassa (penalty missed); Gumbs (penalty scored); Monteiro (penalty scored); Jević (penalty scored)	3–5	(penalty scored) Bridge; (penalty scored) Topor-Stanley; (penalty scored) Sarkies; (penalty scored) O'Dor; (penalty scored) Vidosić

Hong Kong Stadium, Hong Kong
Attendance: 13,564

=== Final ===
5 February 2007
20:15

China Olympic Team	0–0	Jamaica Olympic Team
	(Report)	Smith (yellow card) 50'; Finlayson (yellow card) 58'; Palmer (yellow card) 93'
Penalties
Zhou (penalty scored); Jiang (penalty scored); L. Dai (penalty scored); Q. Dai (penalty missed); Yang (penalty scored); Wan (penalty missed)	4–5	(penalty missed) Finlayson; (penalty scored) Reid; (penalty scored) J. Taylor; (penalty scored) Whittaker; (penalty scored) Palmer; (penalty scored) Davis

Hong Kong Stadium, Hong Kong
Attendance: 13,564

== Bracket ==
Semi-finals
2 February 2007 – Hong Kong
Hong Kong League XI	1 (3)
Jamaica Olympic Team (pen.)	1 (5)
2 February 2007 – Hong Kong
China Olympic Team	2
Australia Olympic Team	0

Final
5 February 2007 – Hong Kong
Jamaica Olympic Team (pen.)	0 (5)
China Olympic Team	0 (4)
Third place
5 February 2007 – Hong Kong
Hong Kong League XI	2 (3)
Australia Olympic Team (pen.)	2 (5)

2007 Carlsberg Cup champions

Jamaica
First title

== Top scorers ==
2 goals

- (Hong Kong) Keith Gumbs

1 goal

- (Australia) Bruce Djite
- (Jamaica) Fabian Taylor
- (Hong Kong) Festus Baise
- (China) Jiang Ning
- (Australia) Nathan Burns

== See also ==
- Hong Kong Football Association
- Hong Kong First Division League
