= 2007 A-League Pre-season Challenge Cup =

Tournament details
- Country: Australia; New Zealand
- Dates: 14 July – 12 August 2007
- Teams: 8

Final positions
- Champions: Adelaide United (2nd title)
- Runners-up: Perth Glory

Tournament statistics
- Matches played: 20
- Goals scored: 53 (2.65 per match)

The 2007 A-League Pre-season Challenge Cup competition was held in July and August in the lead-up to the start of the A-League 2007-08 season. The opening round started on 14 July 2007. The competition featured a group stage, with three regular rounds, followed by a two-week finals playoff.

In previous years, the Pre-season Cup was used to enhance the A-League's profiles by playing pre-season games in regional centres. In 2007 venues included Sunshine Coast, Launceston, Canberra, Port Macquarie, Darwin, Orange and Geelong.

The group stage had a bonus point system. One point was awarded for 2 goals in a match, two points for 3 and three points for 4 or more goals in a match.

If two or more teams were level on points accumulated, the following criteria would be applied, in order, until one of the teams was determined as the higher ranked:

1. highest goal difference;
2. highest number of goals scored;
3. result of the match played between the teams concerned;
4. highest number of bonus points accumulated;
5. lowest number of red cards accumulated;
6. lowest number of yellow cards accumulated;
7. toss of a coin.

The finals series was held over two weekends – 3 to 5 August, and 10 to 12 August.

== Pre-Season Cup group stage fixtures and results ==
=== Round 1 ===
14 July 2007
14:30 UTC+10

Newcastle Jets	0–1	Perth Glory
	(Report)	Harnwell 48'

Port Macquarie Regional Stadium,
Port Macquarie, New South Wales
Attendance: 2,700
Referee: James Lewis

14 July 2007
18:00 UTC+10

Central Coast Mariners	2–0	Wellington Phoenix
Wilkinson 3'; Kwasnik 30'	(Report)

Bluetongue Stadium,
Gosford, New South Wales
Attendance: 8,136
Referee: Srebre Delovski

14 July 2007
19:00 UTC+10

Queensland Roar	0–0	Sydney FC
	(Report)

Maroochydore Soccer Club,
Maroochydore, Queensland
Attendance: 4,892
Referee: Peter Green

15 July 2007
13:00 UTC+10

Melbourne Victory	1–1	Adelaide United
Allsopp 74'	(Report)	Dodd 9'

Aurora Stadium,
Launceston, Tasmania
Attendance: 8,061
Referee: Angelo Nardi

=== Round 2 ===
20 July 2007
19:30 UTC+9:30

Adelaide United	1–1	Perth Glory
Cassio 59'	(Report)	Rukavytsya 53'

Hindmarsh Stadium,
Adelaide, South Australia
Attendance: 3,513
Referee: Steven Gregory

21 July 2007
15:00 UTC+10

Central Coast Mariners	1–1	Queensland Roar
Boogaard 6'	(Report)	Lynch 60'

Wade Park,
Orange, New South Wales
Attendance: 3,531
Referee: James Lewis

22 July 2007
14:00 UTC+12

Wellington Phoenix	3–0	Sydney FC
Smeltz 13', 89'; Rudan 14' (own)	(Report)

Westpac Stadium,
Wellington, New Zealand
Attendance: 6,039
Referee: Peter O’Leary

22 July 2007
14:00 UTC+10

Melbourne Victory	0–1	Newcastle Jets
	(Report)	Wheelhouse 51'

Skilled Stadium,
Geelong, Victoria
Attendance: 8,500
Referee: Ben Williams

=== Round 3 ===
27 July 2007
19:00 UTC+12

Wellington Phoenix	1–2	Queensland Roar
Old 47'	(Report)	Lynch 41'; Ognenovski 50'

Queen Elizabeth II Park,
Christchurch, New Zealand
Attendance: 4,081
Referee: Michael Hester

27 July 2007
19:30 UTC+9:30

Adelaide United	4–1	Newcastle Jets
Burns 6'; Djite 66'; Sarkies 80' (pen.); Alagich 86'	(Report)	Bridge (yellow card) 69' (yellow-red card); A. Griffiths (yellow card) 79' (yellow-red card); J. Griffiths 90+2' (pen.)

Hindmarsh Stadium,
Adelaide, South Australia
Attendance: 3,800
Referee: Craig Zetter

28 July 2007
18:30 UTC+9:30

Perth Glory	2–1	Melbourne Victory
Rukavytsya 52'; Harnwell 70'	(Report)	Hernandez 34'

Darwin Football Stadium,
Darwin, Northern Territory
Attendance: 2,700
Referee: Peter Green

29 July 2007
15:00 UTC+10

Sydney FC	0–3	Central Coast Mariners
	(Report)	Osman 36'; Kwasnik 44'; Gumprecht 51'

Canberra Stadium,
Canberra, Australian Capital Territory
Attendance: 5,735
Referee: Ben Williams

=== Playoffs ===
4 August 2007
18:00 UTC+10

Central Coast Mariners	2–3	Perth Glory
Mrdja 43'; Petrovski 90'	(Report)	Dragicevic 23'; Bertos 55'; Tarka 78'

Bluetongue Stadium,
Gosford, New South Wales
Attendance: 5,967
Referee: Ben Williams

4 August 2007
19:30 UTC+10

Newcastle Jets	3–2	Sydney FC
J. Griffiths 5', 76'; Tunbridge 56'	(Report)	Zadkovich 79'; Talay 83'

Parramatta Stadium,
Parramatta, New South Wales
Attendance: 2,611
Referee: Peter Green

4 August 2007
19:30 UTC+10

Melbourne Victory	1–2	Wellington Phoenix
Dodd 34' (own)	(Report)	Smeltz 53'; Daniel 87'

Olympic Park Stadium,
Melbourne, Victoria
Attendance: 4,100
Referee: Kevin Docherty

5 August 2007
18:00 UTC+9:30

Adelaide United	3–2	Queensland Roar
Djite 1'; Petta 45'; Cássio 64'	(Report)	Lynch 16'; Milicic 73'

Hindmarsh Stadium,
Adelaide, South Australia
Attendance: 5,221
Referee: Angelo Nardi

=== Finals ===
10 August 2007
19:30 UTC+12

Wellington Phoenix	0–0	Newcastle Jets
	(Report)
Penalties
Smeltz (penalty missed); Aloisi (penalty scored); Christie (penalty scored); Johnson (penalty missed)	2–4	(penalty scored) J. Griffiths; (penalty scored) Bridge; (penalty scored) Thompson; (penalty scored) Elrich

Westpac Stadium
Attendance: 5,174
Referee: Mike Hester

11 August 2007
19:30 UTC+10

Melbourne Victory	0–1	Sydney FC
	(Report)	Brosque 34'

Olympic Park Stadium
Attendance: 3,400
Referee: Simon Przydacz

12 August 2007
15:00 UTC+9:30

Adelaide United	2–1	Perth Glory
Djite 66'; Cássio 83'	(Report)	Bertos 45'

Hindmarsh Stadium
Attendance: 9,606
Referee: Craig Zetter

12 August 2007
16:00 UTC+10

Central Coast Mariners	1–3	Queensland Roar
Simon 9'	(Report)	Milicic 30'; Nichols (red card) 33'; Marcinho 48'; Seo (red card) 76'; Reinaldo 86'

Bluetongue Stadium
Attendance: 3,500 (estimate)
Referee: James Lewis

=== Group A table ===
Pos	Team	Pld	W	D	L	GF	GA	GD	BP	Pts
1	Adelaide United	3	1	2	0	6	3	+3	3	8
2	Perth Glory	3	2	1	0	4	2	+2	1	8
3	Newcastle Jets	3	1	0	2	2	5	−3	0	3
4	Melbourne Victory	3	0	1	2	2	4	−2	0	1

=== Group B table ===
Pos	Team	Pld	W	D	L	GF	GA	GD	BP	Pts
1	Central Coast Mariners	3	2	1	0	6	1	+5	3	10
2	Queensland Roar	3	1	2	0	3	2	+1	1	6
3	Wellington Phoenix	3	1	0	2	4	4	0	2	5
4	Sydney FC	3	0	1	2	0	6	−6	0	1

=== Finals ===
Playoffs
A1	Adelaide United	3
B2	Queensland Roar	2
A2	Perth Glory	3
B1	Central Coast Mariners	2
A3	Newcastle Jets	3
B4	Sydney FC	2
A4	Melbourne Victory	1
B3	Wellington Phoenix	2

Finals
Grand final
Adelaide United	2
Perth Glory	1
Third place
Queensland Roar	3
Central Coast Mariners	1
Fifth place
Newcastle Jets	0 (4)
Wellington Phoenix	0 (2)
Seventh place
Sydney FC	1
Melbourne Victory	0

=== Scorers ===
As at 12 August 2007

3 goals

- (Brazil) Cássio (Adelaide United)
- (Australia) Bruce Djite (Adelaide United)
- (Australia) Joel Griffiths (Newcastle Jets)
- (Scotland) Simon Lynch (Queensland Roar)
- (New Zealand) Shane Smeltz (Wellington Phoenix)

2 goals

- (New Zealand) Leo Bertos (Perth Glory)
- (Australia) Jamie Harnwell (Perth Glory)
- (Australia) Adam Kwasnik (Central Coast Mariners)
- (Australia) Ante Milicic (Queensland Roar)
- (Australia) Nikita Rukavytsya (Perth Glory)

1 goal

- (Australia) Richie Alagich (Adelaide United)
- (Australia) Danny Allsopp (Melbourne Victory)
- (Australia) Nigel Boogaard (Central Coast Mariners)
- (Australia) Alex Brosque (Sydney FC)
- (Australia) Nathan Burns (Adelaide United)
- (Brazil) Daniel (Wellington Phoenix)
- (Croatia) Mate Dragičević (Perth Glory)
- (Australia) Travis Dodd (Adelaide United)
- (Germany) Andre Gumprecht (Central Coast Mariners)
- (Costa Rica) Carlos Hernandez (Melbourne Victory)
- (Brazil) Marcinho (Queensland Roar)
- (Australia) Nick Mrdja (Central Coast Mariners)
- (Australia) Sasa Ognenovski (Queensland Roar)
- (New Zealand) Steven Old (Wellington Phoenix)
- (Australia) Matthew Osman (Central Coast Mariners)
- (Australia) Sasho Petrovski (Central Coast Mariners)
- (Australia) Bobby Petta (Adelaide United)
- (Brazil) Reinaldo (Queensland Roar)
- (Australia) Kristian Sarkies (Adelaide United)
- (Australia) Matt Simon (Central Coast Mariners)
- (Australia) Ufuk Talay (Sydney FC)
- (Australia) David Tarka (Perth Glory)
- (Australia) Scott Tunbridge (Newcastle Jets)
- (Australia) Jobe Wheelhouse (Newcastle Jets)
- (Australia) Alex Wilkinson (Central Coast Mariners)
- (Australia) Ruben Zadkovich (Sydney FC)

Own goals

- (New Zealand) Karl Dodd (Wellington Phoenix) for (Melbourne Victory)
- (Australia) Mark Rudan (Sydney FC) for (Wellington Phoenix)
