= Xavian =

Xavian is a masculine given name most often used in English-speaking countries.

Notable people with the name include:

- Xavian Sorey (born 2002), American football player
- Xavian Stapleton (born 1996), American basketball player
- Xavian Virgo (born 1985), Jamaican footballer
