= Vaughan Coveny =

New Zealand footballer

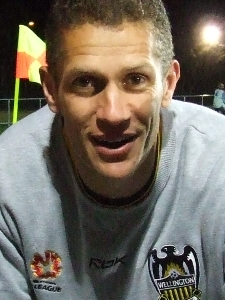
- Coveny with Wellington Phoenix

Personal information
- Full name: Vaughan Barry Coveny
- Date of birth: 13 December 1971 (age 54)
- Place of birth: Wellington, New Zealand
- Height: 1.91 m (6 ft 3 in)
- Position: Striker

Youth career
- Newlands United
- Porirua Viard

Senior career*
Years	Team	Apps	(Gls)
1990	Waterside Karori	17	(4)
1991–1992	Miramar Rangers	?	(?)
1992–1993	Melbourne Knights	22	(4)
1993–1995	Wollongong Wolves	24	(12)
1995–2004	South Melbourne FC	251	(98)
2004	Essendon Royals	5	(2)
2005–2006	South Melbourne FC	36	(14)
2005–2006	→ Newcastle Jets (loan)	10	(4)
2006–2007	Newcastle Jets	21	(5)
2007–2009	Wellington Phoenix	27	(1)
2009	South Melbourne FC	14	(4)
2011	Essendon United FC	4	(5)
Total		418	(135)

International career
- New Zealand U23
1992–2006	New Zealand	64	(29)

Managerial career
- 2010–2011: South Melbourne
- 2011–2014: Melbourne Victory Youth (assistant)
- 2021–2024: Western United U21
Medal record
Representing New Zealand
Men's Association football
OFC Nations Cup
Winner	1998 Australia
Third place	2004 Australia
- * Club domestic league appearances and goals

Vaughan Coveny (born 13 December 1971) is a retired professional football player from New Zealand. Coveny's senior club career spanned 20 years, mostly in Australia, with his most notable stint being at South Melbourne during their National Soccer League era. He was primarily a striker although he also played as a winger. After retiring from playing, he pursued a coaching career. He was recently the head coach of the Western United under 21's side.

== Club career ==
Coveny began his NSL career at the Melbourne Knights, then moved to Wollongong City.

=== South Melbourne FC ===
The majority of Coveny's career was spent at South Melbourne in the NSL, and later on, Victorian Premier League.

Coveny, affectionately known by fans as Horsey due to his speed, primarily played as a striker for South Melbourne. Coveny would dominate the NSL with his pace and would capture two NSL Championships under Ange Postecoglou in 1997–98 and 1998–99. Additionally, his goalscoring form in the OFC Championship in 1999 fired South to claim the title as Oceania's best and qualify them for the 2000 FIFA Club World Cup. Here, Coveny would put in respectable performances including hitting the post twice against the treble winning Manchester United squad.

Following the disbanding of the back-to back winning squad, Coveny would stay at South and lead the new era in the new century. Coveny would once again reach a grand final for South in 2001 but ultimately lose.

The disbanding of the NSL was a premature end to Coveny's first stint as South.

Coveny would return to Lakeside in 2009 helping South to capture the Hellenic cup. On Anzac Day 2009 Coveny scored his 100th goal for South Melbourne FC away at John Ilhan Memorial Reserve against Hume City FC causing a pitch invasion from the Hellas supporters. He retired at the end of the 2009 season becoming only the third player to score over 100 goals for South.

Overall, Coveny made 265 league appearances for Hellas scoring 104 goals.

=== Later career ===
He also spent some time in the A-League following the collapse of the NSL, playing for the Newcastle Jets and Wellington Phoenix.

== International career ==
Coveny made his full New Zealand debut in a 0–0 draw with Fiji on 19 September 1992. He was included in the New Zealand side for both the 1999 FIFA Confederations Cup finals tournament, and the 2003 FIFA Confederations Cup finals tournament. He ended his international playing career with 64 A-international caps to his credit, his final cap gained in a 1–1 draw with Estonia on 31 May 2006.

Coveny became New Zealand's highest goal scorer on 27 May 2006, when he scored twice in the "All Whites" 3–1 victory over Georgia, bringing his total A-international goal tally to 29. and his total including unofficial games to 30 in 71 games, surpassing Jock Newall's long standing record of 28 from only 17 games. Coveny record was officially overtaken by Chris Wood on 21 March 2022 when Wood scored his 30th goal. In January 2009, Coveny announced his retirement from international football. He was also the games record holder for the All Whites, until Ivan Vicelich passed him in 2009. He is currently ranked third in appearances for the All Whites, behind Simon Elliott and Vicelich.

== Managerial career ==
After retiring, Coveny was announced as South Melbourne's manager for the Victorian Premier League 2010 season. After the team failed to make the finals, his contract was not renewed.

== Career statistics ==
=== Club ===
Club	Season	League			National Cup		Other		Total	
Club	Season	Division	Apps	Goals	Apps	Goals	Apps	Goals	Apps	Goals
Waterside Karori	1990	National Soccer League	17	4			—		17	4
Melbourne Knights	1992–93	National Soccer League	23	4	1	1	—		24	5
Melbourne Knights	1993–94	National Soccer League	5	0	0	0	—		5	0
Melbourne Knights	Total		28	4	1	1	0	0	32	5
Wollongong City	1993–94	National Soccer League	14	3	0	0	—		14	3
Wollongong City	1994–95	National Soccer League	24	12	2	1	—		26	13
Wollongong City	1995–96	National Soccer League	24	12	0	0	—		24	12
Wollongong City	Total		42	27	2	1	0	0	44	28
South Melbourne	1996–97	National Soccer League	26	9	2	0	—		28	9
South Melbourne	1997–98	National Soccer League	24	6	—		—		24	6
South Melbourne	1998–99	National Soccer League	29	7	—		—		29	7
South Melbourne	1999–2000	National Soccer League	31	14	—		5+ (Note: Appearances in OFC Club Championship; appearances in FIFA Club World Championship)	2+	36	19
South Melbourne	2000–01	National Soccer League	32	8	—		—		32	8
South Melbourne	2001–02	National Soccer League	16	9	—		—		16	9
South Melbourne	2002–03	National Soccer League	21	11	—		—		21	11
South Melbourne	2003–04	National Soccer League	24	12	—		—		24	12
South Melbourne	Total		203	76	2	0	5+	2+	210+	78+
Essendon Royals	2004	Victorian Premier League	5	1	—		—		5	1
South Melbourne	2005	Victorian Premier League			—		—			
South Melbourne	2006	Victorian Premier League			—		—			
South Melbourne	Total									
Newcastle Jets (loan)	2005–06	A-League	8	4	—		2 (Note: Appearances in A-League Finals)	0	10	4
Newcastle Jets	2006–07	A-League	18	3	—		3	2	21	5
Wellington Phoenix	2007–08	A-League	17	1	—		—		17	1
Wellington Phoenix	2008–09	A-League	9	0	—		—		9	0
Wellington Phoenix	Total		26	1	0	0	0	0	26	1
South Melbourne	2009	Victorian Premier League	14	4	—		—		14	4
Career total										

=== Inrernational ===
Appearances and goals by national team and year
National team	Year	Apps	Goals
New Zealand	1992	3	0
New Zealand	1993	4	0
New Zealand	1994	0	0
New Zealand	1995	8	1
New Zealand	1996	4	0
New Zealand	1997	8	5
New Zealand	1998	6	4
New Zealand	1999	10	1
New Zealand	2000	0	0
New Zealand	2001	5	9
New Zealand	2002	1	0
New Zealand	2003	5	1
New Zealand	2004	5	6
New Zealand	2005	1	0
New Zealand	2006	4	2
Total		64	29

Scores and results list New Zealand’s goal tally first, score column indicates score after each Coveny goal.

List of international goals scored by Vaughan Coveny
No.	Date	Venue	Opponent	Score	Result	Competition
1	20 June 1995	Estadio Municipal Francisco Sánchez Rumoroso, Coquimbo, Chile	Turkey	1–0	1–2	Copa Centenario del Fútbol Chileno
2	25 January 1997	Sydney Football Stadium, Sydney, Australia	South Korea	1–0	1–3	Four Nations Tournament
3	11 June 1997	North Harbour Stadium, Auckland, New Zealand	Papua New Guinea	1–0	7–0	1998 FIFA World Cup qualification
4	11 June 1997	North Harbour Stadium, Auckland, New Zealand	Papua New Guinea	2–0	7–0	1998 FIFA World Cup qualification
5	11 June 1997	North Harbour Stadium, Auckland, New Zealand	Papua New Guinea	6–0	7–0	1998 FIFA World Cup qualification
6	18 June 1997	North Harbour Stadium, Auckland, New Zealand	Fiji	2–0	5–0	1998 FIFA World Cup qualification
7	28 September 1998	Lang Park, Brisbane, Australia	Vanuatu	2–0	8–1	1998 OFC Nations Cup
8	28 September 1998	Lang Park, Brisbane, Australia	Vanuatu	3–0	8–1	1998 OFC Nations Cup
9	28 September 1998	Lang Park, Brisbane, Australia	Vanuatu	5–0	8–1	1998 OFC Nations Cup
10	28 September 1998	Lang Park, Brisbane, Australia	Vanuatu	6–0	8–1	1998 OFC Nations Cup
11	29 June 1999	National Stadium, Singapore	Singapore	1–0	1–0	Friendly
12	6 June 2001	North Harbour Stadium, Auckland, New Zealand	Tahiti	1–0	5–0	2002 FIFA World Cup qualification
13	6 June 2001	North Harbour Stadium, Auckland, New Zealand	Tahiti	3–0	5–0	2002 FIFA World Cup qualification
14	6 June 2001	North Harbour Stadium, Auckland, New Zealand	Tahiti	4–0	5–0	2002 FIFA World Cup qualification
15	11 June 2001	North Harbour Stadium, Auckland, New Zealand	Solomon Islands	1–0	5–1	2002 FIFA World Cup qualification
16	11 June 2001	North Harbour Stadium, Auckland, New Zealand	Solomon Islands	3–0	5–1	2002 FIFA World Cup qualification
17	13 June 2001	North Harbour Stadium, Auckland, New Zealand	Vanuatu	1–0	7–0	2002 FIFA World Cup qualification
18	13 June 2001	North Harbour Stadium, Auckland, New Zealand	Vanuatu	2–0	7–0	2002 FIFA World Cup qualification
19	13 June 2001	North Harbour Stadium, Auckland, New Zealand	Vanuatu	5–0	7–0	2002 FIFA World Cup qualification
20	24 June 2001	Stadium Australia, Sydney, Australia	Australia	1–2	1–4	2002 FIFA World Cup qualification
21	9 June 2003	University of Richmond Stadium, Richmond, United States	United States	1–1	1–2	Friendly
22	2 June 2004	Hindmarsh Stadium, Adelaide, Australia	Vanuatu	1–1	2–4	2004 OFC Nations Cup
23	2 June 2004	Hindmarsh Stadium, Adelaide, Australia	Vanuatu	2–3	2–4	2004 OFC Nations Cup
24	4 June 2004	Marden Sports Complex, Adelaide, Australia	Tahiti	1–0	10–0	2004 OFC Nations Cup
25	4 June 2004	Marden Sports Complex, Adelaide, Australia	Tahiti	4–0	10–0	2004 OFC Nations Cup
26	4 June 2004	Marden Sports Complex, Adelaide, Australia	Tahiti	5–0	10–0	2004 OFC Nations Cup
27	6 June 2004	Hindmarsh Stadium, Adelaide, Australia	Fiji	2–0	2–0	2004 OFC Nations Cup
28	25 May 2006	Stadion Altenkirchen, Altenkirchen, Germany	Georgia	1–0	3–1	Friendly
29	25 May 2006	Stadion Altenkirchen, Altenkirchen, Germany	Georgia	3–1	3–1	Friendly

== Honours ==
=== Player ===
South Melbourne FC

- NSL Championship: 1997/1998, 1998/1999
- NSL Premiership 1997/1998, 2000, 2001
- NSL Cup: 1995/1996
- Dockerty Cup: 1995
- OFC Championship: 1999
- Hellenic Cup: 2009

New Zealand

- OFC Nations Cup: 1998; 3rd place, 2004

=== Individual ===
New Zealand Young Player of the Year: 1992
