= Shane Smeltz =

New Zealand footballer (born 1981)

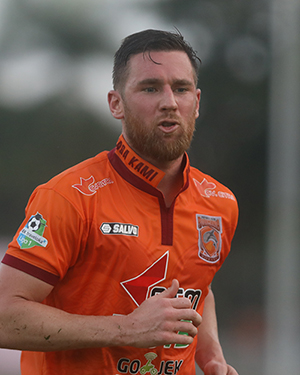
- Smeltz with Borneo FC in 2017

Personal information
- Full name: Shane Edward Smeltz
- Date of birth: 29 September 1981 (age 45)
- Place of birth: Göppingen, West Germany
- Height: 6 ft 1 in (1.85 m)
- Position: Forward

Youth career
- 1997–1998: QAS

Senior career*
Years	Team	Apps	(Gls)
1999	Gold Coast City		
1999–2001	Brisbane Strikers	25	(0)
2001–2002	Napier City Rovers	21	(20)
2002–2003	Adelaide City	23	(7)
2003–2004	Adelaide United	7	(1)
2004	MetroStars	8	(2)
2005	Mansfield Town	5	(0)
2005–2006	AFC Wimbledon	43	(19)
2006–2007	Halifax Town	31	(2)
2007–2009	Wellington Phoenix	39	(21)
2009–2010	Gold Coast United	28	(21)
2010–2011	Gençlerbirliği	6	(1)
2011	Gold Coast United	10	(7)
2011–2014	Perth Glory	58	(28)
2014–2016	Sydney FC	43	(12)
2016	Kedah FA	18	(11)
2016–2017	Wellington Phoenix	12	(3)
2017	Borneo	20	(5)
2020–2023	Gold Coast United	45	(28)
2023	Guiseley	3	(0)
Total		445	(188)

International career
2001	New Zealand U20	6	(3)
2004	New Zealand U23	5	(7)
2012	New Zealand Olympic (O.P.)	5	(2)
2003–2017	New Zealand	58	(24)
- * Club domestic league appearances and goals

Shane Edward Smeltz (born 29 September 1981) is a New Zealand former professional footballer who played as a forward.

Smeltz had spent much of his early career playing in Australia before moving to England where he played for two and a half seasons. He played mostly in the A-League from 2007 onwards, with the exception of brief stints with Gençlerbirliği in Turkey and Kedah FA in Malaysia. He ended his professional playing career with Indonesian team Borneo F.C., before returning to the sport at a semi-professional level.

Smeltz is the all-time second-highest goalscorer in the A-League and was the top-goalscorer for Gold Coast United. He scored 24 goals in 58 international appearances for New Zealand and played at the 2010 FIFA World Cup.

== Early and personal life ==
Smeltz was born in Göppingen, West Germany to ethnic German parents with New Zealand citizenship. Six months later he moved to New Zealand. In November 1987, at the age of six, Smeltz moved to the Gold Coast in Queensland, Australia, where he pursued a career in football through the Queensland Academy of Sport and was brought up for the remainder of his adolescent years while holding a New Zealand visa. Smeltz was granted dual-citizenship at the age of 23, becoming a dual-citizen of New Zealand and Australia. He attended Palm Beach Currumbin High School on the Gold Coast during his teenage years and was classmates with future professional surfers Mick Fanning and Joel Parkinson.

Smeltz lives in Sydney with his wife Nikki (who later became a federal election candidate for United Australia Party) and daughters Bonnie and Scarlett but spends the off season on the Gold Coast and still considers it to be his home.

Smeltz currently works player agent, and represents a number of players.

== Club career ==
=== In England 2005–07 ===
Smeltz played for a variety of amateur and semi-professional Australian clubs before he played a brief five match spell for Mansfield Town in the English Football League Two in 2005. After being released by Mansfield he signed for AFC Wimbledon in March 2005, where he made 60 competitive appearances and scored 26 goals. He played the following season for Halifax Town in the Conference National.

=== Wellington Phoenix ===
Smeltz returned to New Zealand in 2007, signing a two-year deal with the Wellington Phoenix in the A-League. In his first season, he finished second in the Golden Boot race with nine goals from 19 appearances. In the 2008–09 season, Smeltz scored a record-equalling 12 goals for the A-League season proper, resulting in the A-League Golden Boot 2008-09 and also goal of the season for his winning strike against Melbourne Victory at Westpac Stadium in round 13. In 2008–09 season Smeltz was voted the A-League's best player and was awarded the Johnny Warren Medal.

=== Gold Coast United ===
In November 2008 the Phoenix lost its battle to retain Smeltz for the 2009 season as he signed a three-year deal with A-League expansion club Gold Coast United.

Smeltz scored nine goals on his Gold Coast United debut as Miron Bleiberg's men recorded a 12–1 victory in their inaugural outing, a friendly against Mudgeeraba SC.

On 8 August 2009, Smeltz scored his club's first goal in their first A-League game against Brisbane Roar. In the following week Smeltz scored an impressive four goals against North Queensland Fury, which included a penalty. Smeltz and Gold Coast recorded their first loss to the Newcastle Jets at the next round, notable for being the only game he had not scored a goal.

A week later, Smeltz rebounded from his club's first loss to help in the win against Sydney FC. In the process he added another two goals to his tally taking him to an outstanding 8 goals from 5 games, his single man goal count was greater than any other club's overall amount in the league.

With 19 A-League goals to his name, he was formerly the holder for most A League goals in a season.

=== Shandong Luneng ===
On 12 July 2010, after a stellar season with Gold Coast United, it was announced Smeltz had agreed to terms with Chinese club Shandong Luneng on a two-year contract subject to passing a medical. On 17 July 2010, it was announced that Smeltz had "changed his mind about China and decided to return home", just five days into his contract. There was some confusion after his decision to return home in regards to which club he was contracted to.

Shandong Luneng had paid the transfer fee to Gold Coast United, but a Football Federation Australia source confirmed that Gold Coast United had not dispatched Smeltz's International Transfer Clearance form, meaning Smeltz was therefore free to rejoin them without any possibility of an international tug-of-war over his services.

On 17 July 2010, Gold Coast United owner Clive Palmer publicly stated that he is "hopeful of retaining him for the coming season."

=== Gençlerbirliği ===
On 24 August, his overseas career was given a lifeline when he was signed by Turkish Süper Lig club Gençlerbirliği. Smeltz made his debut for the club in their 2–1 home win over Istanbul BB. Smeltz scored his first goal for the club in the 1–0 home win over Ankaragucu with a 45th-minute penalty.

=== Perth Glory ===
On 20 March 2011 it was announced that Perth Glory and Smeltz signed a three-year contract worth A$4.1 million with the A-League club as a marquee. In his second appearance in the League for Perth, he scored a brace to take him to 51 League goals in the A-League, becoming only the second player to have scored a half-century in the competition next to Archie Thompson. On 24 March 2012 he scored all 4 goals in a 4–2 win against Melbourne Victory.

=== Sydney FC ===
On 18 May 2014, it was announced that Smeltz would be parting ways with Perth Glory after three years at the club, to join Sydney FC on a one-year deal. After the 2014–15 season, Smeltz signed a 2-year contract extension with Sydney, taking him to the end of the 2016–17 season.

=== Kedah FA ===
On 12 July 2016, Smelz joined Malaysian Super League club Kedah FA. On 20 July 2016, he made his debut goal for Kedah, against T-Team in Malaysia Cup, scoring two goals.

=== Return to Wellington Phoenix ===
On 18 December 2016, Smeltz returned to New Zealand, signing with Wellington Phoenix until the end of the season.

=== Borneo FC ===
On 9 April 2017, Smeltz joined Indonesian club side Borneo in the Liga 1.

=== Return to Gold Coast United ===
Following an 18-year career, Smeltz retired from professional football on 11 February 2018.

He subsequently signed with NPL Queensland team Gold Coast United in January 2020.

=== Guiseley AFC ===
After returning to England for family and work, in January 2023 Smeltz signed for Guiseley AFC, a 7th-tier semi-professional club based in the Leeds suburb of Guiseley.

== International career ==
Smeltz has played for the under-20, under-23 and senior New Zealand national teams. He scored his first goal for the All Whites, an away friendly on 25 April 2006, against Chile. In that game Smeltz also became the first AFC Wimbledon player to win international honours, and the first to become an international goalscorer.

In May 2007, he was the scorer of both New Zealand goals in an impressive 2–2 draw against Wales.

On 19 November 2007, following his impressive form with Wellington Phoenix in the A-League and consistent performances for the All Whites, Smeltz was voted New Zealand footballer of the year, ahead of FA Premier League star Ryan Nelsen and Celtic striker Chris Killen. In December 2008, Smeltz was named Oceania federation player of 2007.

Smeltz travelled to South Africa as part of the New Zealand squad for both the 2009 Confederations Cup and 2010 World Cup Finals. He scored a goal at the latter against 2006 World Cup winners Italy in Nelspruit, making him the first ever A-League player to score in the World Cup Finals.

He was part of the New Zealand men's team at the 2012 Summer Olympics.

During a World Cup qualifying match against New Caledonia on 22 March 2013, Smeltz was the victim of a high boot to the face in the opposing penalty area, leaving him bloodied. Smeltz scored his last international goal in a 2015 friendly against Myanmar. He was a part of the New Zealand squad that played in the 2017 FIFA Confederations Cup.

== Career statistics ==
=== Club ===
Appearances and goals by club, season and competition
Club	Season	League			National cup		League cup		Continental		Other		Total	
Club	Season	Division	Apps	Goals	Apps	Goals	Apps	Goals	Apps	Goals	Apps	Goals	Apps	Goals
Napier City Rovers	2002	National Soccer League		19	1	0	—		—		—			19

=== International ===
Appearances and goals by national team and year
National team	Year	Apps	Goals
New Zealand	2003	2	0
New Zealand	2004	2	0
New Zealand	2005	1	0
New Zealand	2006	4	1
New Zealand	2007	6	6
New Zealand	2008	2	4
New Zealand	2009	9	4
New Zealand	2010	8	2
New Zealand	2011	3	0
New Zealand	2012	11	6
New Zealand	2013	2	0
New Zealand	2014	0	0
New Zealand	2015	1	1
New Zealand	2016	0	0
New Zealand	2017	7	0
Total		58	24

Scores and results list New Zealand's goal tally first, score column indicates score after each Smeltz goal.

List of international goals scored by Shane Smeltz
No.	Date	Venue	Opponent	Score	Result	Competition
1	25 April 2006	Estadio El Teniente, Rancagua, Chile	Chile	1–0	1–4	Friendly
2	26 May 2007	Racecourse Ground, Wrexham, Wales	Wales	1–0	2–2	Friendly
3	26 May 2007	Racecourse Ground, Wrexham, Wales	Wales	2–1	2–2	Friendly
4	17 October 2007	Churchill Park, Lautoka, Fiji	Fiji	2–0	2–0	2008 OFC Nations Cup
5	17 November 2007	Korman Stadium, Port Vila, Vanuatu	Vanuatu	1–1	2–1	2008 OFC Nations Cup
6	21 November 2007	Westpac Stadium, Wellington, New Zealand	Vanuatu	2–0	4–1	2008 OFC Nations Cup
7	21 November 2007	Westpac Stadium, Wellington, New Zealand	Vanuatu	3–0	4–1	2008 OFC Nations Cup
8	6 September 2008	Stade Numa-Daly Magenta, Nouméa, New Caledonia	New Caledonia	1–0	3–0	2008 OFC Nations Cup
9	6 September 2008	Stade Numa-Daly Magenta, Nouméa, New Caledonia	New Caledonia	3–0	3–0	2008 OFC Nations Cup
10	10 September 2008	North Harbour Stadium, Auckland, New Zealand	New Caledonia	2–1	3–1	2008 OFC Nations Cup
11	10 September 2008	North Harbour Stadium, Auckland, New Zealand	New Caledonia	3–1	3–1	2008 OFC Nations Cup
12	3 June 2009	National Stadium, Dar es Salaam, Tanzania	Tanzania	1–0	1–2	Friendly
13	10 June 2009	Lucas Masterpieces Moripe Stadium, Pretoria, South Africa	Italy	1–0	3–4	Friendly
14	10 September 2009	King Abdullah II Stadium, Amman, Jordan	Jordan	1–1	3–1	Friendly
15	10 September 2009	King Abdullah II Stadium, Amman, Jordan	Jordan	3–1	3–1	Friendly
16	29 May 2010	Wörthersee Stadion, Klagenfurt, Austria	Serbia	1–0	1–0	Friendly
17	20 June 2010	Mbombela Stadium, Nelspruit, South Africa	Italy	1–0	1–1	2010 FIFA World Cup
18	26 May 2012	Cotton Bowl, Dallas, United States	Honduras	1–0	1–0	Friendly
19	4 June 2012	Lawson Tama Stadium, Honiara, Solomon Islands	Papua New Guinea	1–0	2–1	2012 OFC Nations Cup
20	10 June 2012	Lawson Tama Stadium, Honiara, Solomon Islands	Solomon Islands	4–3	4–3	2012 OFC Nations Cup
21	7 September 2012	Stade Numa-Daly Magenta, Nouméa, New Caledonia	New Caledonia	1–0	2–0	2014 FIFA World Cup qualification
22	11 September 2012	North Harbour Stadium, Auckland, New Zealand	Solomon Islands	1–0	6–1	2014 FIFA World Cup qualification
23	12 October 2012	Stade Pater Te Hono Nui, Pirae, French Polynesia	Tahiti	1–0	2–0	2014 FIFA World Cup qualification
24	7 September 2015	Thuwunna Stadium, Yangon, Myanmar	Myanmar	1–0	1–1	Friendly

== Honours ==
Napier City Rovers

- Chatham Cup: 2002

MetroStars

- South Australian First Division Championship: 2004

AFC Wimbledon

- Surrey Senior Cup: 2004–05

Perth Glory

- A-League Men Grand Final runner-up: 2012

Sydney FC

- A-League Men Grand Final runner-up: 2015

Kedah FA

- Malaysia Cup: 2016

New Zealand

- OFC Nations Cup
  - Winner: 2008
  - Third place: 2004, 2012

Individual

- Oceania Footballer of the Year: 2007, 2008
- OFC Nations Cup top goalscorer: 2008
- Johnny Warren Medal: 2008–2009 with Wellington Phoenix
- A-League Golden Boot: 2008–2009 with Wellington Phoenix – 12 goals
- A-League Golden Boot: 2009–2010 with Gold Coast United – 19 goals
- NZF Men's Player of the Year: 2007
- Wellington Phoenix Player of the Year: 2007–08
- Wellington Phoenix Player's Player of the Year: 2007–08, 2008–09
- Wellington Phoenix Media Player of the Year: 2007–08, 2008–09
- Wellington Phoenix A-League Golden Boot: 2008–09
- A-League PFA Team of the Season: 2008–09, 2009-10
- PFA Team of the Decade (2005-2015)

== See also ==
- New Zealand national football team
- New Zealand at the FIFA World Cup
- New Zealand national football team results
- List of New Zealand international footballers
