= Dai Qinhua =

Chinese footballer

Dai Qinhua 代钦华
Personal information
- Date of birth: September 7, 1985 (age 41)
- Place of birth: Anshan, Liaoning, China
- Height: 1.78 m (5 ft 10 in)
- Position: Midfielder

Senior career*
Years	Team	Apps	(Gls)
2004–2009	Changsha Ginde	37	(0)
2010–2012	Hunan Billows	66	(2)
2013–2014	Shenyang Shenbei	37	(2)
2015–2017	Shenyang Urban	21	(1)

International career
2006–2008	China U-23		
- * Club domestic league appearances and goals as of 13 October 2017

Dai Qinhua (born 7 September 1985 in Anshan, Liaoning) is a Chinese football player.

== Club career ==
Dai Qinhua started his senior career with top tier club Shenyang Ginde in the 2003 Chinese league season where he made nine appearances within his debut season. For the next several seasons he would become a regular squad player and be part of the team that moved to Changsha and renamed themselves Changsha Ginde. After six years despite being considered a talented player he couldn't establish himself within the club and after only 37 league appearances Dai was allowed to move to second tier club Hunan Billows in February 2010.

In January 2013, Dai Qinhua signed with Chinese League One club Shenyang Shenbei on a free transfer.

In 2015, Dai signed for Shenyang Urban.

== International career ==
Dai was a member of the Chinese Olympic team and was expected to appear in the 2008 Summer Olympic, however he was dropped from the team due to ligament damage.
