= Allien Whittaker =

Jamaican footballer (born 1983)

Personal information
- Date of birth: 19 June 1983 (age 43)
- Place of birth: Jamaica
- Position: Goalkeeper

Senior career*
Years	Team	Apps	(Gls)
- Portmore United F.C.
- Jamaica Defence Force

International career
2007	Jamaica	1	(0)
- * Club domestic league appearances and goals

Allien Whittaker (born 19 June 1983) is a Jamaican retired footballer.
