= Adrian Reid (Jamaican footballer) =

Jamaican footballer (born 1985)

Personal information
- Date of birth: 10 March 1985 (age 41)
- Place of birth: Kingston, Jamaica
- Height: 1.87 m (6 ft 2 in)
- Position: Defender

Senior career*
Years	Team	Apps	(Gls)
2004–2005	Waterhouse F.C.		
2005–2014	Portmore United	88	(2)
2009	→ Lillestrøm (loan)	0	(0)
2011	→ Vålerenga (loan)	0	(0)
2014–2017	San Juan Jabloteh		

International career
2004–2005	Jamaica U20	6	(0)
2006–2013	Jamaica	34	(0)
- * Club domestic league appearances and goals

Adrian Reid (born 10 March 1985) is a Jamaican former professional footballer who played as a defender.

== Club career ==
Reid played for Waterhouse Kingston from 2004 to 2005, and then joined Portmore United. In 2008 and 2009 Reid had trials with Vålerenga, Aalesund and Lillestrøm in Norway. In August 2009 it was announced that Lillestrøm signed Reid on loan for the rest of the autumn. He returned to Portmore United in January 2010.

On 17 March 2011, he signed a loan agreement with Vålerenga, the club he played a training match with against Liverpool in 2008. He returned to Portmore United in summer 2011.

== International career ==
Reid played for the Jamaican U20 national team from 2004 to 2005 and the U23 squad from 2005 to 2007. He made 34 appearances for the Jamaica senior national team.
