= Felipe Campos (Brazilian footballer) =

Brazilian footballer (born 1981)

Felipe
Personal information
- Full name: Felipe Souza Campos
- Date of birth: 24 May 1981 (age 45)
- Place of birth: Jacareí, São Paulo, Brazil
- Height: 1.72 m (5 ft 8 in)
- Position: Attacking midfielder

Team information
- Current team: Guarani de Palhoça

Senior career*
Years	Team	Apps	(Gls)
2005	CFZ do Rio		
2005–2006	Cabofriense	14	(1)
2006	CFZ do Rio		
2007	Hajduk Split	0	(0)
2007–2008	Wellington Phoenix	17	(3)
2009–	Al Raed	50	(11)
2010	→ Al-Wehda (loan)	7	(2)
2013	Madureira	1	(0)
2013	Guarani de Palhoça	6	(0)
- * Club domestic league appearances and goals

Felipe Souza Campos (born 24 May 1981), sometimes known as just Felipe, is a Brazilian football player, who plays for Guarani de Palhoça.

== Biography ==
=== Club career ===
An attacking midfielder who occupies the hole between midfield and the strikers, he joined the Wellington Phoenix prior to the 2007–08 season and signed a 9-month contract with the option of a further year at the end of that. He quickly became a crowd favourite at Wellington, showcasing skills rarely seen in the A-League. In a round 4 away clash against Sydney FC, Wellington Phoenix managed to come out victors 2–1, with Felipe Campos scoring a stunning goal.

Felipe Campos was signed by the Gold Coast Galaxy, but became a free agent after the FFA turned down the Gold Coast licence application for the Australian A-League 2008–09 season. After Australia, Felipe spent 3 weeks with Wisla Krakow in Poland, but when the transfer window closed, he went back to Brazil to play with a local club.

He was signed by the North Queensland Fury on a 2-year contract. Before joining up with North Queensland, Felipe decided to play in Saudi Arabia with Al Raed, and was released by the Fury from his 2-year contract. In June 2010, he was loaned to Al-Wehda by Al Raed.
