= Xavian Virgo =

Jamaican footballer (born 1985)

Personal information
- Full name: Xavian Virgo
- Date of birth: 25 October 1985 (age 41)
- Place of birth: Kingston, Jamaica
- Height: 1.78 m (5 ft 10 in)
- Position: Defender

Team information
- Current team: Mount Pleasant Football Academy
- Number: 13

Youth career
- 2002–2004: Boys' Town

Senior career*
Years	Team	Apps	(Gls)
2004–2013	Boys' Town	250	(8)
2013–	Harbour View F.C.	40	(3)

International career^{‡}
2006–	Jamaica	21	(1)
- * Club domestic league appearances and goals as of 22 December 2007 ‡ National team caps and goals as of 15:58, 2 March 2012 (UTC)

Xavian Virgo (born 25 October 1985) is a Jamaican footballer who plays as a defender for Mount Pleasant Football Academy.

== Club career ==
Virgo was one of Boys' Town's most influential players when they clinched promotion to the Jamaica National Premier League in the 2004–05 season. He was only 19 years of age at that time. He was the backbone of the Boys' Town backline, Virgo has led the squad to a return to the Premier League followed by two successive Flow Jamaica Cup titles.

In 2013, Virgo moved to Harbour View F.C.

== International career ==
Virgo made his debut for Jamaica in a September 2006 Gold Cup qualifying match against Saint Lucia. Xavian earned his ninth cap against South Africa after not been involved in the squad for over three years. Virgo also scored for Jamaica versus New Zealand on 29 February 2012.

== Honours ==
- KSAFA Super League: 1

2004

- JFF Champions Cup: 2

2009, 2010

Premier league :1

2013
