= Cleberson (footballer, born 1978) =

Brazilian footballer and manager

Personal information
- Full name: Cleberson Souza Santos
- Date of birth: 10 February 1978 (age 48)
- Place of birth: Salvador, Bahia, Brazil
- Height: 1.86 m (6 ft 1 in)
- Position: Defender

Youth career
- 1992–1994: Esporte clube Bahia
- 1995–1996: Clube de Regatas do Flamengo

Senior career*
Years	Team	Apps	(Gls)
1996	PSV Eindhoven		
1997–1999	São Paulo		
2000–2001	Atlético Rio Negro Clube		
2001–2002	Bangu Atlético Clube		
2002–2003	Botafogo de Futebol e Regatas		
2003	América Futebol Clube (RN)		
2003–2005	Al-Wahda (Saudi Arabia)	0	(0)
2005	Clube do Remo		
2006–2007	Cabofriense		
2007–2008	Wellington Phoenix	3	(0)

Managerial career
- 2018: Redlands United Football Club
- * Club domestic league appearances and goals

Cleberson Souza Santos (born 10 February 1978), known as just Cleberson, is a Brazilian former footballer who played as a defender.

== Biography ==
He started his club football career in Brazil with São Paulo before moving to Dutch giants PSV Eindhoven.

He returned to Brazil in 2002 with Botafogo and then moved to Saudi Arabia to play for Al-Wahda (Saudi Arabia) until 25 January 2005, he returned to Brazil for Clube do Remo. In July 2005, he left for Cabofriense, signed a one-year deal.

He signed for New Zealand team Wellington Phoenix FC in the A-League on 30 July 2007 but was released from his contract in November 2007.

Cleberson was caught up in a scandal after kissing a referee in a match.

Cleberson was appointed Head Coach of Redlands United Football Club on 18 September 2018

Cleberson is now working in Greenhithe Football Club
