= Steven Old =

New Zealand footballer (born 1986)

Personal information
- Full name: Steven David Old
- Date of birth: 17 February 1986 (age 40)
- Place of birth: Palmerston North, New Zealand

College career
Years	Team	Apps	(Gls)
2004–2005	St. John's Red Storm	44	(5)

Senior career*
Years	Team	Apps	(Gls)
2005–2006	YoungHeart Manawatu	19	(1)
2006–2007	Newcastle Jets	9	(0)
2007–2008	Wellington Phoenix	16	(1)
2009–2011	Kilmarnock	11	(0)
2010	→ Cowdenbeath (loan)	4	(0)
2012	Basingstoke Town	8	(1)
2012–2013	Sutton United	10	(0)
2013–2014	Shijiazhuang Yongchang	29	(1)
2014–2015	Ljungskile SK	61	(6)
2016–2017	GAIS	64	(3)
2017–2020	Morecambe	125	(10)
2020–2023	East Kilbride	?	(?)
2023	Kilwinning Rangers (trial)	3	(0)

International career^{‡}
2003	New Zealand U-17	12	(4)
2005	New Zealand U-20	3	(0)
2008	New Zealand U-23	15	(3)
2004–2009	New Zealand	17	(1)
- * Club domestic league appearances and goals as of 11:35, 2 August 2023 (UTC) ‡ National team caps and goals as of 15 November 2009

Steven David Old (born 17 February 1986) is a New Zealand former footballer who is last played as a defender for East Kilbride in the Lowland League.

== Club career ==
He was released by A-League club Wellington Phoenix at the end of the 2007/08 season. He formerly played for the Newcastle United Jets where he covered for Craig Deans who was in the USA. Prior to joining the Jets, Old attended St. John's University (NY) and played two years of football there.

Old was training with Scottish Premier League club Kilmarnock since 22 January 2009, awaiting his work permit to sign for that team. On 30 March 2009, he signed a three-year contract with Kilmarnock after receiving his permission to play.

In the final weeks of 2010, Old had a loan spell at Cowdenbeath in which he made four appearances. Following his loan spell at Cowdenbeath, Old struggled to make a first team appearance under manager Mixu Paatelainen and Kenny Shiels. In May 2011, Old was released by the club.

In July 2011 Old went on pre-season tour to South Africa with Perth Glory with a view of getting a contract with the A-League club.

On 13 February 2012, Old joined Conference South club Basingstoke Town on non-contract terms after he had been training with them for a couple of months. Old made his debut, the next day, in a 2–2 draw against Salisbury City.

Old joined Conference South club Sutton United in October 2012 and made his debut in the 1–0 home victory against Chelmsford City

On 28 February 2013, Old signed for China League One side Shijiazhuang Yongchang Junhao on transfer deadline day in China; replacing Vlado Jeknić who injured a week before.

With Shijiazhuang, Old's side unsuccessfully faced 2013 Chinese Super League runners-up Shandong Luneng but finished mid-table following the club's relocation from Fujian. Old scored in the final game of the season against Yanbian White Tigers.

On 13 November 2015, he signed up with the Swedish club GAIS. After one goal in 33 league appearances he left the club in the summer of 2017.

On 27 July 2017, Old joined English Football League 2 side Morecambe on a one-year deal, subject to international clearance. Steven would wear the number 5 shirt.

On 2 July 2020, it was announced that Old had left Morecambe having turned down the offer of a further one-year contract; in order to return to Scotland to be closer to his family.

Lowland League club East Kilbride announced the signing of Old on 24 July 2020.

== International career ==
Old captained New Zealand in the Under 17s, as well as being a part of the Under 20s and Under 23s, before progressing to the New Zealand national team, making his debut in a 2006 FIFA World Cup qualification match against Australia on 29 May 2004. Old scored his first international goal on 19 February 2006, in a 1–0 New Zealand victory against Malaysia in Christchurch.

He was included in the New Zealand squad for the football tournament at the Summer Olympics in Beijing. He played in 2 of New Zealand's 3 group matches against China (1–1) and Belgium (0–1). Old missed the 5–0 loss to Brazil after serving a one-game suspension for receiving a red card in their first game against China. Old was named as part of the 2009 FIFA Confederations Cup New Zealand squad.

Old was called up to the New Zealand squad to play Mexico on 3 March 2010 as an injury-replacement player for captain Ryan Nelsen.

International goals
#	Date	Opponent	Final Score	Result	Competition
1	19 February 2006	Malaysia	1–0	Win	Friendly
Last updated 7 April 2010
