= George (footballer, born 1978) =

Brazilian footballer

Personal information
- Full name: George dos Santos Paladini
- Date of birth: 13 March 1978 (age 48)
- Place of birth: Rio de Janeiro, Brazil
- Height: 1.70 m (5 ft 7 in)
- Position: Left attacking midfielder

Senior career*
Years	Team	Apps	(Gls)
1998–1999	Flamengo		
1999–2004	Santa Clara		
2005–2006	Sport Recife		
2006–2007	Carabobo		
2007	Wellington Phoenix	4	(0)
2007–2009	Carabobo	101	(58)
2010–2011	Deportivo Armenio		(5)
- * Club domestic league appearances and goals

George dos Santos Paladini (born 13 March 1978), known mononymously George, is a Brazilian former footballer.

== Biography ==
He started his football career in Brazil with Flamengo before moving to Portugal for five years to play for C.D. Santa Clara.

He returnend to Brazil to play for Sport Recife before he left to play for Venezuelan club Carabobo.

In June 2007, he was signed by A-League club Wellington Phoenix, but left in November 2007.
