= Michael Ferrante =

Australian footballer

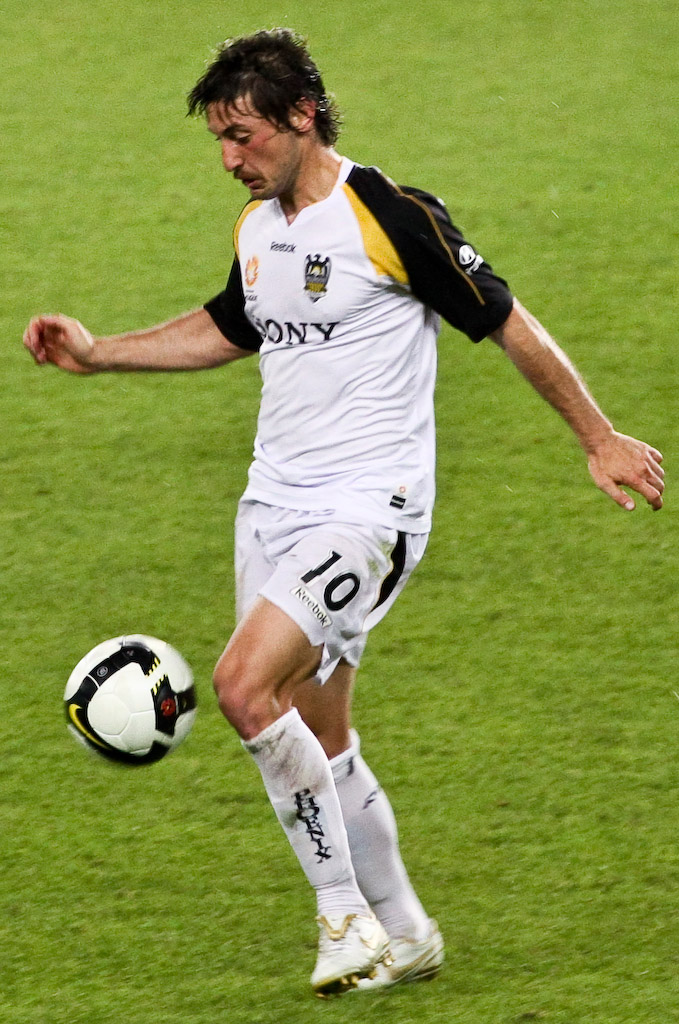

Personal information
- Full name: Michael Ferrante
- Date of birth: 28 April 1981 (age 45)
- Place of birth: Melbourne, Australia
- Height: 1.72 m (5 ft 7 1/2 in)
- Position: Central midfielder

Team information
- Current team: Essendon Royals

Youth career
- Fawkner
- 1997–1998: AIS

Senior career*
Years	Team	Apps	(Gls)
1998–2001	West Ham United	0	(0)
2001–2002	Comprens Stabia	14	(0)
2002–2004	Benevento	9	(0)
2004	Fawkner Blues	8	(5)
2005–2007	Melbourne Victory	26	(1)
2007–2010	Wellington Phoenix	43	(1)
2010–2012	Richmond	45	(14)
2012–2019	Pascoe Vale	141	(10)
2019–2021	Essendon Royals	9	(0)

International career^{‡}
1997	Australia U-17	3	(0)
1999–2001	Australia U-20	10	(8)
Medal record
Representing Australia
Men's Association football
OFC U-19 Men's Championship
Winner	1998 Samoa
Winner	2001 Cook Islands/New Caledonia
- * Club domestic league appearances and goals as of 9 September 2021 ‡ National team caps and goals as of 29 September 2008

Michael Ferrante (born 28 April 1981) is an Australian former footballer. He is currently the senior men's head coach of Essendon Royals SC.

== Biography ==
He attended St. Joseph's College Melbourne from years 1992–1997 being a star week in week out for his school side. He came through the ranks at the Australian Institute of Sport and from there he moved on to the youth team at West Ham United. He captained the team in one of the games of the 9–0 aggregate FA Youth Cup Final triumph over Coventry in 1999. The team included Joe Cole and Michael Carrick who went on to become established Premier League and England players plus fellow Australian and Australian international Richard Garcia.

He had a spell in Italy with Comprensorio Stabia and Serie C side Benevento Calcio before returning to Australia to join Fawkner Blues in 2004. He joined Melbourne's inaugural A-League squad for season 2005–06 and featured in all of Melbourne Victory league games. Following the signings of Fred and Grant Brebner he was frozen out of the squad for the second season and struggled to make appearances. He made 21 appearances for Melbourne in 2005–06, scoring one goal, and five appearances in 2006–07.

After Victory released him from his contract by mutual consent in February 2007, new A-League team Wellington Phoenix signed Ferrante on a two-year deal for the start of the A-League 2007-08 season.

In 2010, he returned home to Melbourne, signing for local club Richmond Eagles mid-season. On 12 July 2012 he announced that a major back injury would prevent him participating in the VPL for the remainder of the 2012. By mutual consent, his contract was terminated and Richmond released him to sign with Pascoe Vale who were managed by his brother Vitale.

== A-League career statistics ==
Correct as of 24 February 2010

Club	Season	League			Finals			Asia			Total		
Club	Season	Apps	Goals	Assists	Apps	Goals	Assists	Apps	Goals	Assists	Apps	Goals	Assists
Melbourne Victory	2005–06	21	1	1	-	-	-	-	-	-	21	1	1
Melbourne Victory	2006–07	5	0	0	-	-	-	-	-	-	5	0	0
Wellington Phoenix	2007–08	18	1	1	-	-	-	-	-	-	18	1	1
Wellington Phoenix	2008–09	19	0	0	-	-	-	-	-	-	19	0	0
Wellington Phoenix	2009–10	6	0	0	0	0	0	-	-	-	6	0	0
Total		69	2	2	0	0	0	-	-	-	69	2	2

== Honours ==
Melbourne Victory

- A-League Championship: 2006–07
- A-League Premiership: 2006–07

Australia U-20

- OFC U-19 Men's Championship: 1998, 2001
