= Daniel (footballer, born 1979) =

Brazilian footballer

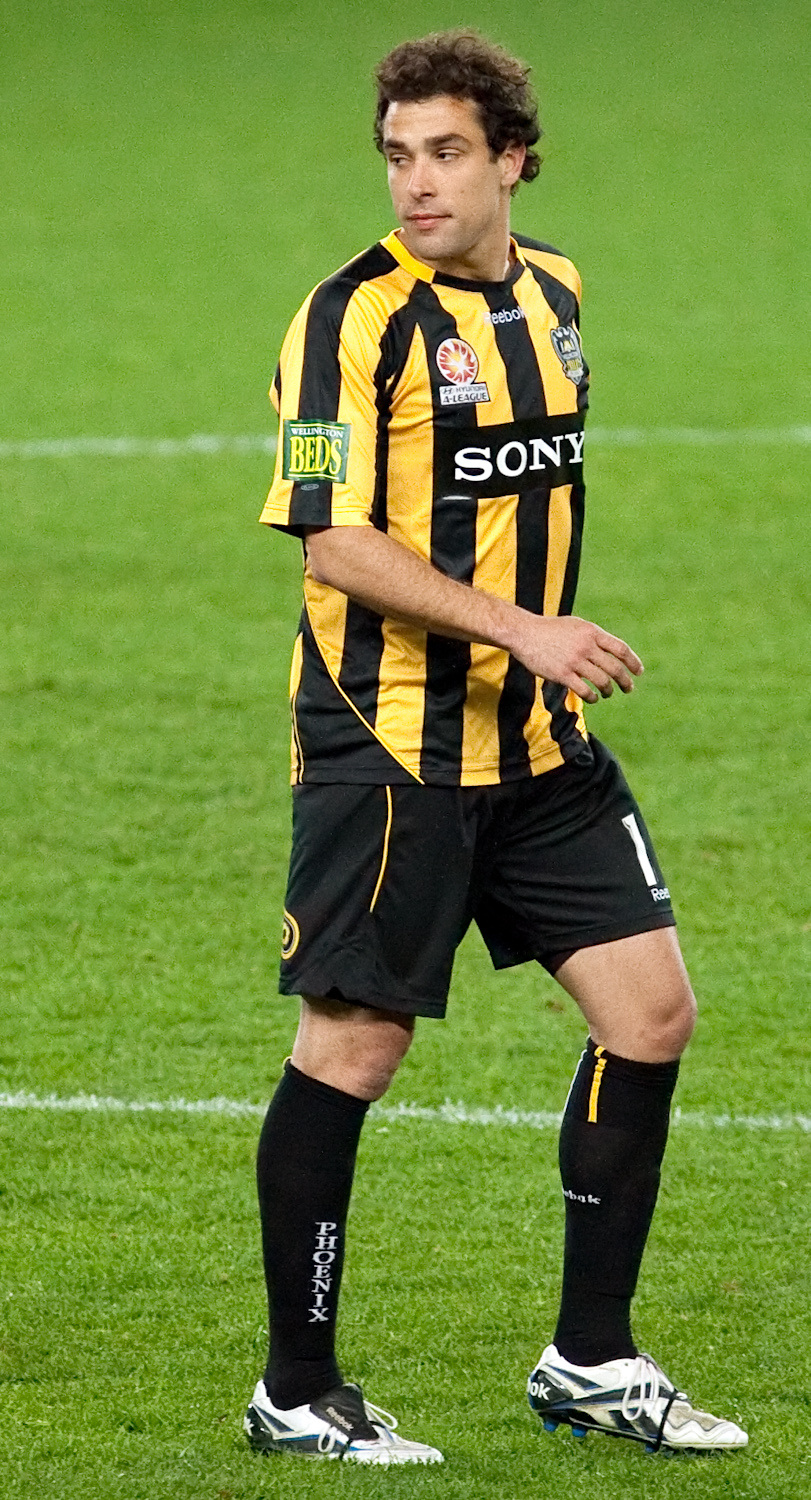

Personal information
- Full name: Daniel Lins Côrtes
- Date of birth: 12 December 1979 (age 46)
- Place of birth: Niterói, Brazil
- Height: 1.80 m (5 ft 11 in)
- Positions: Attacking midfielder; left winger

Senior career*
Years	Team	Apps	(Gls)
1999–2007	Madureira	87	(15)
2003	→ FC Fehérvár (loan)	6	(2)
2002	→ Twente (loan)	12	(2)
2003–2005	→ Botafogo (loan)	66	(5)
2005	→ Juventude (loan)	10	(5)
2006	→ Guarani (loan)	19	(6)
2007–2012	Wellington Phoenix	106	(35)
2012–2013	Police United	30	(11)
- * Club domestic league appearances and goals

Daniel Lins Côrtes (born 12 December 1979), nicknamed Daniel, is a Brazilian-born New Zealand former footballer.

== Club career ==
Born in Niterói, Brazil, Daniel started his professional career at Madureira. In April 1999, he signed for FC Twente. He then returned to Brazil for Madureira he was signed by FC Fehérvár in April 2002 and 2003 returned again to Madureira.

In April 2003, he was signed for three years with one of the biggest clubs in Brazil, Botafogo. In July 2005, he was signed on loan to Juventude. In January 2006, he was signed for Guarani.

=== Wellington Phoenix ===
In July 2007, he was signed by Wellington Phoenix coach Ricki Herbert. Daniel made 17 appearances in his first season, 2007–08, scoring 4 goals. In October 2008, he was rewarded with a new two-year deal, lasting until June 2011. Daniel scored the first ever goal for the Phoenix

Daniel was granted New Zealand citizenship on 2 December 2008 and declared his aspirations to represent New Zealand internationally.

Daniel, a foundation player of the Phoenix, was the second player to reach 50 appearances for the Phoenix behind left-back Tony Lochhead. On 20 January 2012, Daniel made his 100th appearance for the Wellington Phoenix against the Newcastle Jets.

His contract was not renewed for the 2012–13 A-League.

=== INSEE Police ===
On 19 July 2012, INSEE Police United in Thai Premier League announced that Daniel had signed an 18-month contract.

== Representative career ==
Daniel became eligible for New Zealand on 14 May 2012 after residing in the country for five years.

== A-League career statistics ==
As of 13 September 2012

Appearances and goals by club, season and competition
Club	Season	A-League		Finals Series		Asia		Total	
Club	Season	App	Goals	App	Goals	App	Goals	App	Goals
Wellington Phoenix	2007–08	17	8	-	-	-	-	17	4
Wellington Phoenix	2008–09	17	13	-	-	-	-	17	0
Wellington Phoenix	2009–10	20	9	2	0	-	-	22	2
Wellington Phoenix	2010–11	28	14	1	0	-	-	29	0
Wellington Phoenix	2011–12	19	7	2	0	-	-	21	2
Wellington Phoenix	Total	101	51	5	0	–	–	106	8
Career totals		101	51	5	0	–	–	106	8
