= Karl Dodd =

Australian soccer player

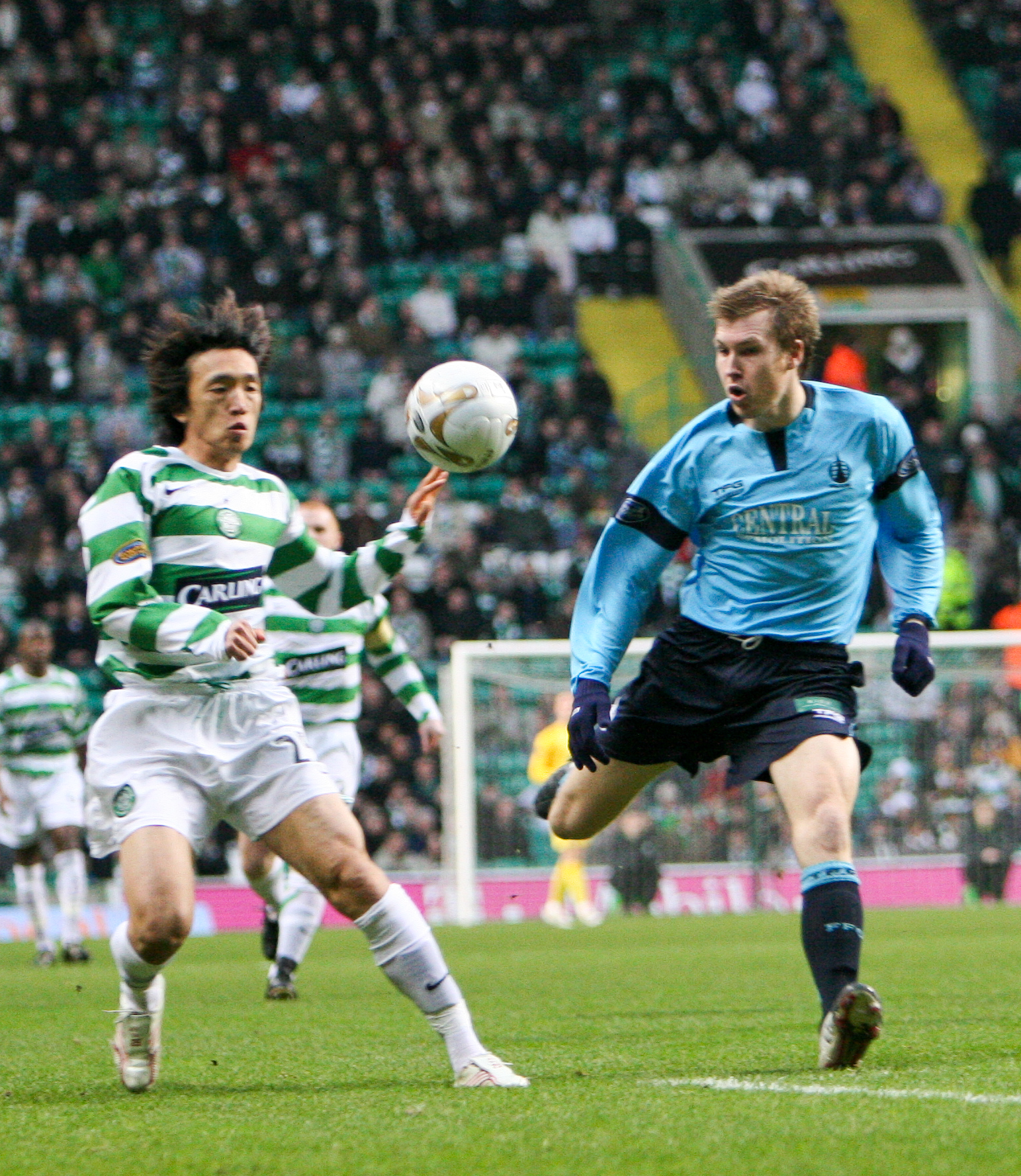
- Nakamura (Celtic) v Dodd (Falkirk)

Personal information
- Full name: Karl Dennis Dodd
- Date of birth: 13 November 1980 (age 45)
- Place of birth: Southport, Australia
- Height: 1.88 m (6 ft 2 in)
- Position: Central defender

Youth career
- Palm Beach

Senior career*
Years	Team	Apps	(Gls)
2000	Gold Coast City		
2001	Sutherland Sharks		
2002	Gold Coast City		
2003	Palm Beach Sharks		
2003–2004	Brisbane Strikers	21	(0)
2005–2006	Queensland Roar	12	(0)
2006	Universitatea Craiova		
2006–2007	Falkirk	28	(0)
2007–2009	Wellington Phoenix	36	(1)
2009	Sydney United		
2009–2010	North Queensland Fury	12	(0)
2011–2012	TSW Pegasus	13	(0)
2013	Moreton Bay United	12	(1)
2014	Palm Beach	10	(1)

Managerial career
- 2014–2015: Western Pride
- 2017–2021: Guam
- 2021: Newcastle Jets (assistant)
- 2021: Newcastle Jets Youth (assistant)
- 2022–2024: Brisbane City
- 2024–2025: Brisbane Roar Youth
- * Club domestic league appearances and goals as of 17 April 2021

Karl Dodd (born 13 November 1980, in Southport, Queensland, Australia) is an Australian former professional soccer player, who was most recently head coach at NPL Queensland club Brisbane Roar Youth.

== Club career ==
He played for the Brisbane Strikers before being recruited by the Queensland Roar for the revamped A-League competition. After half a season with the Queensland Roar he signed for Romanian club FC Universitatea Craiova in January 2006. However, after failing to settle with the club he quickly moved on, joining Falkirk on a short-term contract in March 2006. After impressing manager John Hughes, it was announced on 15 May 2006 that Dodd had agreed a new one-year deal to stay at the club. On 19 May 2007, after turning down a contract extension at Falkrik, he signed a two-year contract with new A-League franchise Wellington Phoenix. He scored his first professional goal for Phoenix on 19 October 2008.

After two years at Wellington. Dodd turned down a three-year contract, and an offer from Newcastle Jets to try his luck in South Korea, "Karl's been an integral member of the Phoenix," Pignata said. "It's disappointing that we're parting company but we wish him all the best for the future." A cartilage problem in his knee prevented his fortune and returned to Australia for surgery and on return from injury signed for the remainder of the 2008–09 season with NSW Premier League team Sydney United FC.

After a strong pre-season he signed with A-League newcomer North Queensland Fury and made his debut against Sydney FC.

On 3 September 2011, Hong Kong First Division League side TSW Pegasus signed Dodd, who was given number 5 in the following season.

== Post-playing career ==
On 5 June 2013, Dodd became the strength and conditioning coach of the Newcastle Jets FC.

In October 2014, Dodd accepted the position of Head Coach of the Western Pride FC Senior Men's Team in the National Premier League (Qld) however in June 2015 he left the club and joined Brisbane Roar FC to take up a position as the High Performance Manager. Karl resigned from his role as the High Performance Manager at Brisbane Roar on 25 March 2017, stating that he was seeking something that "aligns with my professional and personal values"

The Guam Football Association announced that Dodd had signed on as national team manager on 26 December 2017, starting in the next month. Dodd resigned from the post on 16 April 2021, to return home to Australia in order to deal with a family emergency.

On 30 August 2022, Brisbane City announced it had signed Dodd to coach its senior NPL Queensland men's team for the 2023 season.

== Managerial statistics ==
As of match played 17 April 2021

Managerial record by team and tenure
Team	From	To	Record					Ref.
Team	From	To	P	W	D	L	Win %	Ref.
Guam	1 January 2018	16 April 2021	10	2	1	7	20.0	
Total			10	2	1	7	20.0	—
