= Richard Johnson (soccer) =

Australian soccer player

Personal information
- Full name: Richard Mark Johnson
- Date of birth: 27 April 1974 (age 52)
- Place of birth: Kurri Kurri, New South Wales, Australia
- Height: 1.80 m (5 ft 11 in)
- Position: Central midfielder

Youth career
- Weston Workers Bears

Senior career*
| Years | Team | Apps | (Gls) |
| 1990 | Weston Workers Bears | | |
| 1991–2003 | Watford | 242 | (20) |
| 2003 | → Northampton Town (loan) | 6 | (1) |
| 2003–2004 | Colchester United | 0 | (0) |
| 2004 | Stoke City | 7 | (0) |
| 2004–2005 | Queens Park Rangers | 17 | (0) |
| 2005 | → Milton Keynes Dons (loan) | 2 | (0) |
| 2005–2006 | Newcastle United Jets | 18 | (2) |
| 2006–2007 | New Zealand Knights | 15 | (0) |
| 2007–2009 | Wellington Phoenix | 21 | (0) |
| Total | | 328 | (23) |

International career
| 2000 | Australia | 1 | (0) |
- * Club domestic league appearances and goals

Richard Mark Johnson (born 27 April 1974) is an Australian former footballer.

Johnson played for English club Watford for 12 years, making 278 appearances and achieving back-to-back promotions to reach the Premiership in 1999. Following a loan spell at Northampton Town, he played for Colchester United, Stoke City, Queens Park Rangers, Milton Keynes Dons in England after leaving Watford, before finished his career in the A-League with Newcastle United Jets, New Zealand Knights and Wellington Phoenix.

Johnson is currently academy director at Watford, having held a variety of administrative positions at the club since 2018.

== Club career ==
Johnson was born in Kurri Kurri, New South Wales and played for Weston Workers Bears before moving to England to become a professional. He joined the youth ranks of Watford, and made his league début in the closing stages of the 1991–92 season. Johnson's ability to shoot accurately and powerfully from long distance secured him the "Goal of the Season" award for the 1994–95 season, for a 30-yard shot in a game against Wolverhampton Wanderers.

Often in and out of the side for much of his early Watford career, Johnson became an integral part of Graham Taylor's re-shaped Watford side as it started the 1997–98 season. He formed a central midfield partnership with Micah Hyde that was to help drive Watford to the 1997–98 Division Two Championship. Johnson was also to show his long-range shooting skills in the 4–0 victory over rivals Luton Town at Kenilworth Road, scoring the first goal. The Hyde-Johnson axis continued into the 1998–99 season, with Johnson playing in Watford's drive to the play-offs and picking up a winners medal in the 2–0 final victory over Bolton Wanderers. Johnson was to play a limited part in Watford's first Premiership season, with injuries sustained in August and January keeping him out for two months each time.

Playing in a match against Manchester United on 29 April 2000 Johnson ruptured knee ligaments. He did not return until 28 April 2001, featuring in the final three games of the 2000–01 season. However, Johnson suffered a relapse, and he missed all of the 2001–02 season. He returned intermittently in the autumn of 2002, but after picking up another injury was sent on loan to Northampton Town for a month in February 2003 to gain fitness. He scored one goal – against Watford's rivals Luton Town – in 6 games for the Cobblers.

Returning to Watford, Johnson featured in the final few games of the season, but still struggling for fitness and a first-team place he was released in October 2003. He had played 277 times for the Hornets in 11 years at the club, scoring 22 goals. He subsequently joined Colchester United, playing a singular game for the Us in the Football League Trophy. After just a month in Essex, Johnson joined Stoke City. He played nine times for the Potters before joining Queens Park Rangers in February 2004, who were driving towards promotion from Division Two. Johnson played 11 times in Rangers' run-in, helping them to secure second position and automatic promotion.

Johnson started the 2004–05 season in the first-team, but found the step-up to the Championship too demanding and slipped out of the team at the end of August. In October 2004 he was loaned to Milton Keynes Dons for whom he played three times. Returning to QPR, he was unable to regain his place and he was released at the end of the season having not played another game for the London club.

=== A-League ===
Johnson moved back to Australia, joining home-town club Newcastle United Jets in the newly formed A-League. Johnson played a key part in Jets' first season where the team managed a respectable 4th place under then manager Richard Money, starting 20 out of 23 games. However, in the 2006 off-season he moved to A-League club New Zealand Knights for the final year of their existence.

In May 2007 Johnson signed for newly formed A-League team Wellington Phoenix FC. In March 2007, Johnson had been arrested for drink driving in Newcastle and had subsequently been sentenced to eight months in prison. He appealed against this verdict and the sentence was amended to a suspended sentence and a fine, allowing him to take up his contract with Wellington.

On 11 February 2009, Johnson announced he would be retiring from professional football at the end of the 2008–09 A-League season.

== Post-playing career ==
In January 2019, Johnson was appointed technical director at National League South side Wealdstone, while continuing in his role as business development manager at his former club Watford. After three years in his previous role at the club, Johnson became head of academy partnerships at Watford in February 2021. Three months later, he was appointed academy director at the club.

== International career ==
Johnson won his first and only full cap for the Australian national team against the Czech Republic on 29 March 2000. He also played for the Australian national team twice against a Brazilian 'B' side.

== Career statistics ==
| Club | Season | League | | | FA Cup | | League Cup | | Other^{[A]} | | Total | |
| Club | Season | Division | Apps | Goals | Apps | Goals | Apps | Goals | Apps | Goals | Apps | Goals |
|---|---|---|---|---|---|---|---|---|---|---|---|---|
| Watford | 1991–92 | Second Division | 2 | 0 | 0 | 0 | 0 | 0 | 0 | 0 | 2 | 0 |
| Watford | 1992–93 | First Division | 1 | 0 | 0 | 0 | 0 | 0 | 0 | 0 | 1 | 0 |
| Watford | 1993–94 | First Division | 27 | 0 | 1 | 0 | 1 | 0 | 1 | 0 | 30 | 0 |
| Watford | 1994–95 | First Division | 35 | 3 | 1 | 0 | 4 | 0 | 0 | 0 | 40 | 3 |
| Watford | 1995–96 | First Division | 20 | 1 | 2 | 0 | 2 | 1 | 0 | 0 | 24 | 2 |
| Watford | 1996–97 | Second Division | 37 | 2 | 4 | 0 | 2 | 0 | 2 | 0 | 45 | 2 |
| Watford | 1997–98 | Second Division | 42 | 7 | 5 | 0 | 4 | 0 | 0 | 0 | 51 | 7 |
| Watford | 1998–99 | First Division | 40 | 4 | 1 | 1 | 0 | 0 | 3 | 0 | 44 | 5 |
| Watford | 1999–2000 | Premier League | 23 | 3 | 1 | 0 | 1 | 0 | 0 | 0 | 25 | 3 |
| Watford | 2000–01 | First Division | 3 | 0 | 0 | 0 | 0 | 0 | 0 | 0 | 3 | 0 |
| Watford | 2001–02 | First Division | 0 | 0 | 0 | 0 | 0 | 0 | 0 | 0 | 0 | 0 |
| Watford | 2002–03 | First Division | 12 | 0 | 0 | 0 | 0 | 0 | 0 | 0 | 12 | 0 |
| Watford | 2003–04 | First Division | 0 | 0 | 0 | 0 | 1 | 0 | 0 | 0 | 1 | 0 |
| Watford | Total | | 242 | 20 | 15 | 1 | 15 | 1 | 6 | 0 | 278 | 22 |
| Northampton Town (loan) | 2002–03 | Second Division | 6 | 1 | 1 | 0 | 0 | 0 | 0 | 0 | 7 | 1 |
| Colchester United | 2003–04 | Second Division | 0 | 0 | 0 | 0 | 0 | 0 | 1 | 0 | 1 | 0 |
| Stoke City | 2003–04 | First Division | 7 | 0 | 2 | 0 | 0 | 0 | 0 | 0 | 9 | 0 |
| Queens Park Rangers | 2003–04 | Second Division | 11 | 0 | 0 | 0 | 0 | 0 | 0 | 0 | 11 | 0 |
| Queens Park Rangers | 2004–05 | Championship | 6 | 0 | 0 | 0 | 1 | 0 | 0 | 0 | 7 | 0 |
| Milton Keynes Dons (loan) | 2004–05 | League One | 2 | 0 | 0 | 0 | 0 | 0 | 1 | 0 | 3 | 0 |
| Newcastle United Jets | 2005–06 | A-League | 18 | 2 | — | | — | | — | | 18 | 2 |
| New Zealand Knights | 2006–07 | A-League | 15 | 0 | — | | — | | — | | 15 | 0 |
| Wellington Phoenix | 2007–08 | A-League | 14 | 0 | — | | — | | — | | 14 | 0 |
| Wellington Phoenix | 2008–09 | A-League | 7 | 0 | — | | — | | — | | 7 | 0 |
| Career Total | | | 328 | 23 | 18 | 1 | 16 | 1 | 8 | 0 | 370 | 25 |

A. The "Other" column constitutes appearances and goals in the Anglo-Italian Cup, Football League Trophy and Football League play-offs.

=== International ===
| National team | Year | Apps | Goals |
|---|---|---|---|
| Australia | 2000 | 1 | 0 |
| Total | | 1 | 0 |

== Honours ==
Watford

- Football League First Division play-offs: 1999
- Football League Second Division: 1997–98
