= Steven O'Dor =

Australian soccer player

Personal information
- Full name: Steven O'Dor
- Date of birth: 28 January 1987 (age 39)
- Place of birth: Melbourne, Australia
- Height: 1.88 m (6 ft 2 in)
- Position: Centre back

Youth career
- South Melbourne
- 2000–2003: Monash City FC
- AIS

Senior career*
Years	Team	Apps	(Gls)
2004	Fitzroy City	22	(1)
2005–2006	South Melbourne	20	(0)
2006–2007	New Zealand Knights	3	(0)
2007	South Melbourne	14	(1)
2007–2008	Wellington Phoenix	13	(0)
2008–2013	South Melbourne	97	(10)

International career^{‡}
2006–2007	Australia U-20	15	(0)
2007	Australia U-23	2	(0)
- * Club domestic league appearances and goals as of 16 December 2012 ‡ National team caps and goals as of 23 May 2010

Steven O'Dor (born 28 January 1987) in Melbourne is a retired Australian footballer.

== Club career ==
He went to school at Haileybury College from Year 4 through to Year 12, making the first team in Year 8. As a junior player he played for Monash City FC in the Super League from 2000 to 2003. Finishing his schooling in 2004 he then moved on to start a University Degree in law and commerce at Deakin University in Melbourne.

His senior career commenced with South Melbourne in the Victorian Premier League, then moving onto the Australian Institute of Sport and the New Zealand Knights in the A-League. He made several starts for the Knights in the latter part of their 2006–07 season.

On 5 May 2007 he was signed by Wellington Phoenix on a two-year deal.

On 17 January 2008 O'Dor decided to terminate his two-year contract with the Phoenix after receiving a letter from Deakin University explaining that he needed to resume his university studies.

On 17 September 2008 he returned to South Melbourne, signing a two-year deal.

In February 2012, O'Dor decided to retire from football to continue his studies.

He was most recently working as head coach of Mazenod United Football Club, an Old Collegians seniors team located in Mulgrave, Melbourne.

== International career ==
He has made 15 appearances for the Young Socceroos, making his debut in 2006 in a 3–0 win against Turkmenistan.

== Honours ==
With South Melbourne:

- (Australia) Victorian Premier League Championship:2006
