= 2008–09 Newcastle Jets FC season =

Newcastle United Jets FC
2008–09 season
- Owner: Con Constantine
- CEO: John Tsatsimas
- Manager: Gary van Egmond
- Top goalscorer: Joel Griffiths; 7 goals
- Highest home attendance: 16,079 v Central Coast Mariners; 15 August 2008
- Lowest home attendance: 6,268 v Melbourne Victory; 19 December 2008

The 2008–09 season was the fourth season for the Newcastle Jets, and the first as defending champions.

== Players ==
=== First team squad ===
Note: Flags indicate national team as defined under FIFA eligibility rules; some limited exceptions apply. Players may hold more than one non-FIFA nationality.

No.	Pos.	Nation	Player
1	GK	AUS	Ante Covic (Vice-Captain)
2	DF	AUS	Adam Griffiths (Vice-Captain)
3	DF	AUS	Jade North (Captain)
5	MF	AUS	James Holland (Youth)
6	MF	DEN	Jesper Håkansson
7	MF	AUS	Kaz Patafta
8	MF	AUS	Matt Thompson
9	FW	AUS	Joel Griffiths (Captain)
10	MF	KOR	Song Jin-Hyung
11	DF	AUS	Tarek Elrich
12	MF	AUS	Jobe Wheelhouse
13	MF	AUS	Adam D'Apuzzo (Junior Marquee)
14	MF	AUS	Shaun Ontong
15	FW	AUS	Jason Hoffman (Youth)
16	MF	AUS	Ben Kantarovski (Youth)
17	DF	AUS	Antun Kovacic

No.	Pos.	Nation	Player
18	MF	AUS	Noel Spencer
19	FW	AUS	Jason Naidovski (Youth)
20	GK	AUS	Ben Kennedy
23	FW	ECU	Edmundo Zura (Marquee)
24	FW	AUS	Marko Jesic (Short Term-Youth Team)
25	DF	AUS	Daniel Piorkowski (Short Term)
26	MF	AUS	Mark Milligan
27	MF	TLS	Jesse Pinto (Short Term-Youth Team)
28	DF	AUS	Jarrad Ross (Short Term-Youth Team)
29	FW	AUS	Sean Rooney (Short Term)
30	GK	AUS	Justin Pasfield (Short Term)
31	FW	AUS	James Virgili (Short Term-Youth Team)
32	FW	AUS	Brodie Mooy (Short Term-Youth Team)
33	MF	AUS	Taylor Regan (Short Term-Youth Team)
40	GK	AUS	Ben McNamara (Short Term-Youth Team)

=== Transfers ===
In

- (Australia) Sean Rooney from Sydney FC
- (Australia) Justin Pasfield from Wollongong Wolves
- (Australia) Daniel Piorkowski from Walsall FC
- (Australia) Jason Naidovski from AIS
- (Australia) Shaun Ontong from Adelaide United
- (Australia) Kaz Patafta from S.L. Benfica
- (Australia) Antun Kovacic from Richmond SC
- (Denmark) Jesper Håkansson from Lyngby BK
- (Ecuador) Edmundo Zura from Imbabura SC (loan)

Out

- (Australia) Stephen Laybutt, Contract Not Renewed
- (Brazil) Denni, Contract Not Renewed
- (Australia) Andrew Durante, to Wellington Phoenix
- (Australia) Mark Bridge, to Sydney FC
- (Australia) Paul Kohler, Released
- (Australia) Stuart Musialik, to Sydney FC
- (Australia) Troy Hearfield, to Wellington Phoenix
- (Australia) Scott Tunbridge, Released

Triallists
The following players trialled with the Jets but were unsuccessful in gaining a contract.

- (Australia) Jarrad Ross
- (Australia) Mark Byrnes
- (Australia) Yanni Galanos
- (Italy) Valerio Mastrelli
- (Italy) Simone Bracalello
- (Cameroon) Severin Brice Bikoko (could not obtain Visa)
- (England) Joe Keenan (signed for Hibernian instead)
- (Iraq) Ali Abbas
- (Iraq) Ali Khader
- (Germany) Andre Gumprecht (returned to the Mariners)

== Matches ==
=== 2008 Pre Season Cup ===
==== Group A ====
Team	Pld	W	D	L	GF	GA	GD	Pts	Qualification
Melbourne Victory	3	2	0	1	3	2	+1	6	Advances to final
Adelaide United	3	1	2	0	2	1	+1	5	
Newcastle Jets	3	0	2	1	1	2	−1	2	
Perth Glory	3	0	2	1	1	2	−1	2	

19 July 2008 Group Stage	Perth Glory	1 : 1	Newcastle Jets	Mandurah
19:00 UTC+10	Trinidad 12' (pen.)	Report	Spencer 36'	Attendance: 3,825; Referee: Steven Gregory

26 July 2008 Group Stage	Newcastle Jets	0 : 0	Adelaide United	Baddeley Park Cessnock
19:00 UTC+10		Report		Attendance: 2,756

2 August 2008 Group Stage	Newcastle Jets	0 : 1	Melbourne Victory	Port Macquarie Regional Stadium
14:30 UTC+10		Report	Pondeljak 82'	Attendance: 3,133

=== 2008–09 Hyundai A-League fixtures ===
15 August 2008	Newcastle Jets	1 : 1	Central Coast Mariners	EnergyAustralia Stadium, Newcastle
20:00 UTC+10	J. Griffiths 90+1' (pen.)	Report; Summary	Simon 87'	Attendance: 16,022; Referee: (Australia) Matthew Breeze

22 August 2008	Perth Glory	3 : 3	Newcastle Jets	Members Equity Stadium, Perth
19:00 UTC+8	Trinidad 35' (pen.); Dadi 58'; Rukavytsya 81'	Report Summary	J. Griffiths 20' (pen.); Coyne 49' (o.g.); North 90+5'	Attendance: 8,876; Referee: (Australia) Craig Zetter

29 August 2008	Melbourne Victory	5 : 0	Newcastle Jets	Telstra Dome, Melbourne
18:00 UTC+10	Hernández 41'; A. Thompson 45+2'; Allsopp 61', 64'; Brebner 90'	Report; Summary		Attendance: 22,589; Referee: (Australia) Mark Shield

13 September 2008	Newcastle Jets	0 : 0	Sydney FC	EnergyAustralia Stadium, Newcastle
19:00 UTC+10		Report; Summary	Prentice (yellow card) 83' (yellow-red card) 87'	Attendance: 11,535; Referee: (New Zealand) Peter O'Leary

19 September 2008	Queensland Roar	0 : 1	Newcastle Jets	Suncorp Stadium, Brisbane
20:00 UTC+10		Report; Summary	J. Griffiths 83'	Attendance: 12,103; Referee: (Australia) Craig Zetter

27 September 2008	Adelaide United	2 : 0	Newcastle Jets	Hindmarsh Stadium, Adelaide
18:30 UTC+9:30	Cristiano 72', 89'	Report; Summary		Attendance: 8,111; Referee: (Australia) Strebre Delovski

6 October 2008	Newcastle Jets	2 : 2	Wellington Phoenix	EnergyAustralia Stadium, Newcastle
15:00 UTC+11	T. Elrich 59'; Patafta 68'	Report; Summary	Smeltz 52' (pen.), 89' (pen.)	Attendance: 8,492; Referee: (Australia) Craig Zetter

18 October 2008	Newcastle Jets	1 : 0	Melbourne Victory	EnergyAustralia Stadium, Newcastle
19:00 UTC+11	Jesic 85'	Report; Summary	A. Thompson (red card) 58'	Attendance: 11,384; Referee: (Australia) Matthew Breeze

24 October 2008	Central Coast Mariners	1 : 0	Newcastle Jets	Bluetongue Stadium, Gosford
20:00 UTC+11	Macallister 33'	Report; Summary		Attendance: 10,710; Referee: (Australia) Matthew Breeze

2 November 2008	Newcastle Jets	1 : 2	Queensland Roar	EnergyAustralia Stadium, Newcastle
17:00 UTC+11	J. Griffiths 23'	Report; Summary	McKay 24'; Miller 35'	Attendance: 10,507; Referee: (Australia) Craig Zetter

9 November 2008	Perth Glory	2 : 2	Newcastle Jets	Members Equity Stadium, Perth
17:00 UTC+9	Rukavytsya 27'; Dadi 90+2' (pen.); Coyne (red card) 60'	Report; Summary	J. Griffiths 17'; T. Elrich 45'; Piorkowski (red card) 68'	Attendance: 7,837; Referee: (Australia) Matthew Breeze

23 November 2008	Wellington Phoenix	2 : 0	Newcastle Jets	Westpac Stadium, Wellington
18:00 UTC+13	Smeltz 79'; Hearfield 86'	Report; Summary	J. Griffiths (red card) 29'; Milligan (red card) 50'	Attendance: 5,500; Referee: (Australia) Matthew Breeze

30 November 2008	Newcastle Jets	1 : 1	Adelaide United	EnergyAustralia Stadium, Newcastle
17:00 UTC+11	M. Thompson 56'	Report; Summary	Ognenovski 90+4'	Attendance: 7,136; Referee: (Australia) Chris Beath

7 December 2008	Newcastle Jets	1 : 2	Sydney FC	EnergyAustralia Stadium, Newcastle
17:00 UTC+11	Wheelhouse 11'	Report; Summary	Fyfe 15'; Gan 78'	Attendance: 7,872; Referee: (Australia) Strebre Delovski

14 December 2008	Queensland Roar	2 : 1	Newcastle Jets	Suncorp Stadium, Brisbane
18:00 UTC+10	Nichols 45+2' van Dijk 90+1'	Report; Summary	J. Griffiths 26'; Wheelhouse (yellow card) 11' (yellow-red card) 70'	Attendance: 11,048; Referee: (Australia) Ben Williams

19 December 2008	Newcastle Jets	4 : 2	Melbourne Victory	EnergyAustralia Stadium, Newcastle
20:00 UTC+11	M. Thompson 16', 45', 49'; Song 60'	Report; Summary	Allsopp 66'; Ney Fabiano 87'	Attendance: 6,268; Referee: (Australia) Craig Zetter

26 December 2008	Newcastle Jets	1 : 2	Central Coast Mariners	EnergyAustralia Stadium, Newcastle
20:00 UTC+11	J. Griffiths 9' (pen.)	Report; Summary	Petrovski 67'; Simon 80'; Dylan Macallister (red card) 90+5'	Attendance: 11,413; Referee: (New Zealand) Peter O'Leary

4 January 2009	Wellington Phoenix	3 : 0	Newcastle Jets	Westpac Stadium, Wellington
19:00 UTC+13	Bertos 62'; Smeltz 67', 86' (pen.)	Report; Summary		Attendance: 7,520; Referee: (Australia) Craig Zetter

9 January 2009	Adelaide United	2 : 0	Newcastle Jets	Hindmarsh Stadium, Adelaide
19:30 UTC+10:30	Barbiero 23'; Pantelis 74'	Report; Summary		Attendance: 13,585; Referee: (Australia) Peter Green

18 January 2009	Newcastle Jets	2 : 1	Perth Glory	EnergyAustralia Stadium, Newcastle
17:00 UTC+11	Kovacic 41'; Milligan 55' (pen.)	Report; Summary	Bulloch 65'	Attendance: 6,665; Referee: Kris Griffith-Jones

25 January 2009	Sydney FC	4 : 0	Newcastle Jets	Sydney Football Stadium, Sydney
17:00 UTC+11	Brosque 13', 41'; Milligan 77' (o.g.); Bridge 86'	Report; Summary		Attendance: 9,551; Referee: (Australia) Kevin Docherty

=== League table ===
Pos	Team	Pld	W	D	L	GF	GA	GD	Pts	Qualification
1	Melbourne Victory (C)	21	12	2	7	39	27	+12	38	Qualification for 2010 AFC Champions League group stage and Finals series
2	Adelaide United	21	11	5	5	31	19	+12	38	Qualification for 2010 AFC Champions League group stage and Finals series
3	Queensland Roar	21	10	6	5	36	25	+11	36	Qualification for Finals series
4	Central Coast Mariners	21	7	7	7	35	32	+3	28	Qualification for Finals series
5	Sydney FC	21	7	5	9	33	32	+1	26	
6	Wellington Phoenix	21	7	5	9	23	31	−8	26	
7	Perth Glory	21	6	4	11	31	44	−13	22	
8	Newcastle Jets	21	4	6	11	21	39	−18	18	

Source: ultimatealeague.com
Rules for classification: 1) points; 2) goal difference; 3) number of goals scored.
(C) Champions

== Statistics ==
=== Goal scorers ===
Last updated 26 January 2009

Name	Pre-Season	A-League	Total
(Australia) Joel Griffiths	0	7	7
(Australia) Matt Thompson	0	4	4
(Australia) Tarek Elrich	0	2	2
(Australia) Marko Jesic	0	1	1
(Australia) Antun Kovacic	0	1	1
(Australia) Mark Milligan	0	1	1
(Australia) Jade North	0	1	1
(Australia) Kaz Patafta	0	1	1
(Australia) Noel Spencer	1	0	1
(South Korea) Song Jin-Hyung	0	1	1
(Australia) Jobe Wheelhouse	0	1	1

=== Discipline ===
Last updated 26 January 2009

Name	Yellow	Red
(Australia) Jobe Wheelhouse	7	1
(Australia) Mark Milligan	3	1
(Australia) Joel Griffiths	2	1
(Australia) Daniel Piorkowski	0	1
(Australia) Adam Griffiths	5	0
(Australia) Tarek Elrich	4	0
(Denmark) Jesper Håkansson	4	0
(Australia) Jade North	3	0
(Australia) Ben Kantarovski	2	0
(Australia) Adam D'Apuzzo	1	0
(Australia) James Holland	1	0
(Australia) Marko Jesic	1	0
(Australia) Jason Naidovski	1	0
(South Korea) Song Jin-Hyung	1	0
(Australia) Noel Spencer	1	0
(Australia) Matt Thompson	1	0
(Ecuador) Edmundo Zura	1	0

== 2009 AFC Champions League ==
The Newcastle Jets qualified for the 2009 edition of the Asian Champions League after defeating Central Coast Mariners to be crowned 2007–08 Champions.

=== Champions League squad ===
Note: Flags indicate national team as defined under FIFA eligibility rules; some limited exceptions apply. Players may hold more than one non-FIFA nationality.

No.	Pos.	Nation	Player
1	GK	AUS	Ante Covic*
2	MF	AUS	Tarek Elrich
3	DF	AUS	Adam D'Apuzzo
4	DF	AUS	Nikolai Topor-Stanley
5	DF	AUS	Ljubo Miličević
6	MF	AUS	Ben Kantarovski
7	MF	KOR	Song Jin-Hyung
8	MF	AUS	Matt Thompson (Captain)
9	FW	AUS	Sasho Petrovski
10	FW	NED	Donny de Groot
11	FW	AUS	Marko Jesic
12	MF	AUS	Jobe Wheelhouse
13	DF	AUS	Jarrad Ross
14	DF	AUS	Angelo Costanzo

No.	Pos.	Nation	Player
15	MF	AUS	Shaun Ontong
16	FW	AUS	Jason Hoffman
17	FW	ITA	Fabio Vignaroli
18	FW	AUS	Peter Haynes
20	GK	AUS	Ben Kennedy
21	FW	AUS	Joel Wood
22	MF	AUS	Mitchell Johnson
23	FW	AUS	Sean Rooney
24	MF	AUS	Kaz Patafta
25	DF	AUS	Adam Griffiths
26	DF	AUS	Nikolas Tsattalios
27	MF	TLS	Jesse Pinto
28	FW	AUS	Brodie Mooy
30	GK	AUS	Ben McNamara

- *Departed part way through the group stage.

==== On Loan ====
- (Australia) Joel Griffiths – From Beijing Guoan until December 2009

==== Transfers ====
In:

- (Australia) 4. Nikolai Topor-Stanley – From Perth Glory
- (Australia) 5. Ljubo Miličević – From Free agent
- (Australia) 9. Sasho Petrovski – From Central Coast Mariners
- (Netherlands) 10. Donny de Groot – From De Graafschap (Netherlands)
- (Australia) 14. Angelo Costanzo – From Adelaide United
- (Australia) 18. Peter Haynes From Broadmeadow Magic FC
- (Italy) 17. Fabio Vignaroli – From Panthrakikos (Greece)
- (Australia) 21. Joel Wood – From Free agent
- (Australia) 22. Mitchell Johnson – From APIA Leichhardt
- (Australia) 26. Nikolas Tsattalios – From Sydney FC

Out:

- (Australia) 3. Jade North – To Incheon United (South Korea)
- (Australia) 5. James Holland – To AZ Alkmaar (Netherlands)
- (Denmark) 6. Jesper Håkansson – Released
- (Australia) 17. Antun Kovacic – To Ulsan Hyundai Horang-i (South Korea)
- (Australia) 18. Noel Spencer – Retired
- (Ecuador) 23. Edmundo Zura – Released
- (Australia) 25. Daniel Piorkowski – Released
- (Australia) 26. Mark Milligan – To Shanghai Shenhua (China)
- (Australia) 30. Justin Pasfield – To North Queensland Fury

=== Group E table ===
Pos	Team	Pld	W	D	L	GF	GA	GD	Pts	Qualification
1	(Japan) Nagoya Grampus	6	3	3	0	10	4	+6	12	Advance to knockout stage
2	(Australia) Newcastle Jets	6	3	1	2	6	5	+1	10	Advance to knockout stage
3	(South Korea) Ulsan Hyundai Horang-i	6	2	0	4	4	10	−6	6	
4	(China) Beijing Guoan	6	1	2	3	4	5	−1	5	

Source: WorldFootball.net

=== Fixtures ===
10 March 2009 Group Stage	Beijing Guoan (China)	2 : 0	(Australia) Newcastle Jets	Workers Stadium, Beijing
20:00	R. Griffiths 7'; Du Wenhui 90'	Report		Attendance: 31,895; Referee: Mohsen Basma (Syria)

17 March 2009 Group Stage	Newcastle Jets (Australia)	2 : 0	(South Korea) Ulsan Hyundai	EnergyAustralia Stadium, Newcastle
20:00	Petrovski 15' 43'	Report		Attendance: 7,415; Referee: Masoud Moradi

7 April 2009 Group Stage	Nagoya Grampus (Japan)	1 : 1	(Australia) Newcastle Jets	Mizuho Athletic Stadium, Nagoya
19:00	Tamada 65'	Report	Elrich 9'	Attendance: 7,198; Referee: Khalil Al Ghamdi (Saudi Arabia)

22 April 2009 Group Stage	Newcastle Jets (Australia)	0 : 1	(Japan) Nagoya Grampus	EnergyAustralia Stadium, Newcastle
			Ogawa 57'	Attendance: 8,492; Referee: Ali Hamad Madhad Saif Albadwawi

6 May 2009 Group Stage	Newcastle Jets (Australia)	2 : 1	(China) Beijing Guoan	EnergyAustralia Stadium, Newcastle
	Petrovski 88'; Rooney 90+4'		R. Griffiths 69'	Attendance: 6,106; Referee: A. M. Hussein Abdulrahman

20 May 2009 Group Stage	Ulsan Hyundai (South Korea)	0 : 1	(Australia) Newcastle Jets	Munsu Cup Stadium, Ulsan
			Hoffman 36'	Referee: Abdul Malik bin Abdul Bashir

24 June 2009 Round of 16	Pohang Steelers (South Korea)	6 : 0	(Australia) Newcastle United Jets	Steelyard Stadium, Pohang
19:30 (UTC+9)	Denilson 9' (pen.); Choi Hyo-Jin 15' 63' 72'; Kim Jae-Sung 56'; Ristić 85'	Report		Attendance: 15,253; Referee: Subkhiddin Mohd Salleh (Malaysia)

== Other squads ==
=== Youth squad ===
Note: Flags indicate national team as defined under FIFA eligibility rules; some limited exceptions apply. Players may hold more than one non-FIFA nationality.

No.	Pos.	Nation	Player
—	GK	AUS	Ben McNamara
—	GK	AUS	Jordan Griffiths
—	DF	AUS	Jon Griffiths
—	DF	AUS	Patrick Wheeler
—	DF	AUS	Jarrad Ross
—	DF	AUS	Simon Mooney
—	DF	AUS	George Strogylos
—	DF	AUS	Joel Witherdin
—	DF	AUS	Jacob Pepper
—	MF	AUS	Taylor Regan
—	MF	AUS	Adrian Karakolevski

No.	Pos.	Nation	Player
—	MF	AUS	Fabian Iacovelli
—	MF	AUS	Matthew Comerford
—	MF	AUS	Matthew Harper
—	MF	TLS	Jesse Pinto
—	FW	AUS	Harry Maguire
—	FW	AUS	Dylan Murphy
—	FW	AUS	James Virgili
—	FW	AUS	Brodie Mooy
—	FW	AUS	Ben Martin
—	FW	AUS	Marko Jesic

=== Women's squad ===
Note: Flags indicate national team as defined under FIFA eligibility rules; some limited exceptions apply. Players may hold more than one non-FIFA nationality.

No.	Pos.	Nation	Player
1	GK	AUS	Alison Logue
2	DF	AUS	Hannah Brewer
3	MF	AUS	Samantha Wood
4	DF	AUS	Libby Sharpe
5	MF	AUS	Cheryl Salisbury (C)
6	FW	AUS	Amber Neilson
7	MF	AUS	Gemma Simon
8	FW	AUS	Leia Smith
9	FW	AUS	Rhali Dobson
10	MF	AUS	Joanne Peters
11	DF	AUS	Stacy Day

No.	Pos.	Nation	Player
12	FW	AUS	Kate Gill
13	DF	AUS	Gemma O'Toole
14	MF	AUS	Nicole Jones
15	MF	AUS	Emily van Egmond
16	DF	AUS	Kirstyn Pearce
17	MF	AUS	Harmony Attwill
18	DF	NZL	Rebecca Smith
19	MF	SWE	Sanna Frostevall
20	GK	AUS	Brianna Davey
21	MF	AUS	Taleah Doyle
22	DF	AUS	Courtney Miller
