= 2009–10 Newcastle Jets FC season =

Newcastle United Jets FC
2009–10 season
- Manager: Gary Van Egmond (Asian Champions League); Branko Culina (A-League)
- A-League: 6th
- Finals: 4th
- Average home league attendance: 6,340

The Newcastle Jets 2009–10 season was the Newcastle Jets' fifth season since the inception of the A-League and ninth since the club's founding, in 2000.

== Players ==
=== First team squad ===
Note: Flags indicate national team as defined under FIFA eligibility rules; some limited exceptions apply. Players may hold more than one non-FIFA nationality.

No.	Pos.	Nation	Player
1	GK	AUS	Ben Kennedy
2	DF	AUS	Angelo Costanzo
3	DF	AUS	Adam D'Apuzzo (Junior Marquee)
4	DF	AUS	Nikolai Topor-Stanley
5	DF	AUS	Ljubo Miličević
6	MF	AUS	Ben Kantarovski (Youth)
7	MF	KOR	Song Jin-Hyung
8	DF	AUS	Matt Thompson (Captain)
9	FW	AUS	Sasho Petrovski
11	MF	AUS	Tarek Elrich
12	MF	AUS	Jobe Wheelhouse
13	DF	AUS	Shaun Ontong

No.	Pos.	Nation	Player
14	FW	ENG	Michael Bridges
15	FW	AUS	Sean Rooney (Youth)
16	FW	AUS	Jason Hoffman (Youth)
17	MF	ITA	Fabio Vignaroli (Marquee)
18	FW	AUS	Marko Jesic (Youth)
19	FW	AUS	Jason Naidovski (Youth)
20	GK	AUS	Neil Young
21	FW	AUS	Brodie Mooy (Youth)
22	MF	AUS	Kaz Patafta
23	FW	AUS	Joel Griffiths
25	FW	AUS	Labinot Haliti (Injury replacement player*)
26	MF	IRQ	Ali Abbas Al-Hilfi (Injury replacement player**)

- * Injury replacement player for Marko Jesic.
- ** Injury replacement player for Shaun Ontong.

=== Youth Squad ===
Note: Flags indicate national team as defined under FIFA eligibility rules; some limited exceptions apply. Players may hold more than one non-FIFA nationality.

No.	Pos.	Nation	Player
1	GK	AUS	Robbie Kolak
2	DF	AUS	Jon Griffiths
3	DF	AUS	Jarrad Ross
4	DF	AUS	Matt Sim
5	DF	AUS	Scott Balderson
6	MF	AUS	Taylor Regan (C)
7	MF	AUS	Mario Šimić
8	FW	AUS	Brodie Mooy
9	FW	AUS	William Angel

No.	Pos.	Nation	Player
10	MF	TLS	Jesse Pinto
11	MF	AUS	James Virgili
12	FW	AUS	Mirjan Pavlović
13	MF	AUS	Fabian Iacovelli
14	FW	AUS	Damian Brosque
15	MF	AUS	Adrian Karakolevski
16	DF	AUS	Umut Tokdogan
20	GK	AUS	Dion Shaw
—			+ up to four over-age players

== Transfers ==
In:

- (Australia) Dion Shaw – Promoted from youth team
- (England) Michael Bridges – Milton Keynes Dons
- (Albania) Labinot Haliti – ŁKS Łódź
- (Iraq) Ali Abbas Al-Hilfi – Marconi FC
- (Australia) Chris Triantis – Sydney Olympic FC
- (Italy) Fabio Vignaroli – Contract Extended
- (Australia) Neil Young – Melbourne Knights
- (Australia) Sean Rooney - Sydney FC Youth

Out:

- (Australia) Joel Griffiths - Beijing Guoan
- (Australia) Mark Milligan - Shanghai Shenhua
- (Australia) Antun Kovacic - Ulsan Hyundai
- (Australia) Ante Čović - IF Elfsborg
- (Australia) Adam Griffiths – Gold Coast United
- (Australia) Daniel Piorkowski – Gold Coast United
- (Australia) Joel Wood – Short Term ACL Contract Expired
- (Australia) Peter Haynes – Short Term ACL Contract Expired
- (Australia) Mitchell Johnson – Short Term ACL Contract Expired
- (Australia) Nikolas Tsattalios – Short Term ACL Contract Expired
- (Timor-Leste) Jesse Pinto – Short Term ACL Contract Expired, Returned to Youth Team
- (Australia) Jarrad Ross – Short Term ACL Contract Expired, Returned to Youth Team
- (Australia) Ben McNamara – Manly United Short Term ACL Contract Expired

Trialists:

- (China) Wang Dong
- (China) Xiao Zhanbo
- (Italy) Andrea Merenda
- (Northern Ireland) Stephen Carson
- (Paraguay) Jorge Florentin
- (Brazil) Felipe Garcia
- (Argentina) Federico Arias

Contract extensions

- (Australia) Tarek Elrich – 2 years
- (Australia) Marko Jesic – 2 years
- (Australia) Ben Kennedy – 2 years
- (Albania) Labinot Haliti – 2 years
- (England) Michael Bridges – 2 years

== Matches ==
=== Pre-season friendlies ===
12 July 2009	Newcastle Jets (Australia)	0 : 2	(Australia) Sydney FC	Port Macquarie
		Summary

19 July 2009	Brisbane Roar (Australia)	1 : 2	(Australia) Newcastle Jets	Ballymore Stadium, Brisbane
		Summary

29 July 2009	Sydney FC (Australia)	1 : 1	(Australia) Newcastle Jets	Sydney Football Stadium, Sydney
		Summary

=== 2009–10 Hyundai A-League fixtures ===
9 August 2009	Newcastle Jets	3 : 2	Wellington Phoenix	EnergyAustralia Stadium, Newcastle
15:00 UTC+10	Hoffman 12', 23'; Naidovski 84'	Report; Summary	Sigmund 26'; Greenacre 43'	Attendance: 6,654; Referee: (Australia) Chris Beath

14 August 2009	Central Coast Mariners	1 : 1	Newcastle Jets	Bluetongue Stadium, Gosford
20:00 UTC+10	Boogaard 50'	Report; Summary	Song 47'	Attendance: 9,573; Referee: (Australia) Ben Williams

23 August 2009	Perth Glory	2 : 0	Newcastle Jets	ME Bank Stadium, Perth
15:00 UTC+8	Shroj 24'; Pellegrino 73'	Report; Summary		Attendance: 9,398; Referee: (Australia) Craig Zetter

30 August 2009	Newcastle Jets	1 : 0	Gold Coast United	EnergyAustralia Stadium, Newcastle
15:00 UTC+10	Rooney 39'	Report; Summary		Attendance: 6,390; Referee: (Australia) Matthew Breeze

3 September 2009	Melbourne Victory	1 : 1	Newcastle Jets	Etihad Stadium, Melbourne
19:30 UTC+10	A. Thompson 42'	Report; Summary	Haliti 87'	Attendance: 15,168; Referee: (Australia) Chris Beath

12 September 2009	Newcastle Jets	0 : 3	Brisbane Roar	EnergyAustralia Stadium, Newcastle
17:30 UTC+10		Report; Summary	Henrique 24'; Reinaldo 26'; Miller 70'	Attendance: 6,026; Referee: (Australia) Ben Williams

20 September 2009	Sydney FC	2 : 1	Newcastle Jets	Sydney Football Stadium, Sydney
15:00 UTC+10	Bridge 26'; Corica 55' (pen.)	Report; Summary	M. Thompson 37'; T. Elrich (red card) 90'	Attendance: 10,357; Referee: (Australia) Ben Williams

25 September 2009	Newcastle Jets	0 : 1	Perth Glory	EnergyAustralia Stadium, Newcastle
20:00 UTC+10		Report; Summary	Sterjovski 81' (pen.)	Attendance: 4,738; Referee: (Australia) Matthew Breeze

5 October 2009	Adelaide United	1 : 1	Newcastle Jets	Hindmarsh Stadium, Adelaide
16:30 UTC+10:30	Cássio 76'	Report; Summary	Song 6'	Attendance: 12,090; Referee: (Australia) Chris Beath

18 October 2009	Newcastle Jets	1 : 3	Melbourne Victory	EnergyAustralia Stadium, Newcastle
15:00 UTC+11	Haliti 22'	Report; Summary	A. Thompson 62'; Pondeljak 79'; Hernández 85'	Attendance: 6,029; Referee: (Australia) Ben Williams

23 October 2009	Newcastle Jets	2 : 1	Central Coast Mariners	EnergyAustralia Stadium, Newcastle
20:00 UTC+11	Bridges 8'; Haliti 14'	Report; Summary	Kwasnik 19'	Attendance: 6,188; Referee: (Australia) Strebre Delovski

30 October 2009	Brisbane Roar	1 : 1	Newcastle Jets	Suncorp Stadium, Brisbane
19:30 UTC+10	van Dijk 36' (pen.)	Report; Summary	Haliti 32'	Attendance: 7,509; Referee: (Australia) Chris Beath

4 November 2009	Wellington Phoenix	3 : 0	Newcastle Jets	Westpac Stadium, Wellington
20:00 UTC+13	T. Brown 27'; Greenacre 55'; Ifill 90+1'	Report; Summary		Attendance: 4,115; Referee: (Australia) Ben Williams

8 November 2009	Newcastle Jets	2 : 0	North Queensland Fury	EnergyAustralia Stadium, Newcastle
17:00 UTC+11	M. Thompson 55'; Bridges 85' (pen.)	Report; Summary		Attendance: 6,271; Referee: (Australia) Ryan Shepheard

22 November 2009	Newcastle Jets	0 : 1	Wellington Phoenix	EnergyAustralia Stadium, Newcastle
17:00 UTC+11		Report; Summary	Ifill 14'	Attendance: 4,329; Referee: (Australia) Peter Green

29 November 2009	Sydney FC	1 : 3	Newcastle Jets	Sydney Football Stadium, Sydney
17:00 UTC+11	Brosque 75'	Report; Summary	Bridges 22' (pen.), 55'; M. Thompson 58'	Attendance: 9,996; Referee: (Australia) Strebre Delovski

4 December 2009	Adelaide United	0 : 2	Newcastle Jets	Hindmarsh Stadium, Adelaide
19:30 UTC+10:30		Report; Summary	M. Thompson 45+1'; Song 81' (pen.)	Attendance: 8,502; Referee: (Australia) Kevin Docherty

13 December 2009	Newcastle Jets	3 : 2	Gold Coast United	EnergyAustralia Stadium, Newcastle
17:00 UTC+11	Wheelhouse 6'; Rooney 70'; Petrovski 82'	Report; Summary	Smeltz 44' (pen.), 84'	Attendance: 5,254; Referee: (Australia) Ben Williams

20 December 2009	Newcastle Jets	3 : 2	North Queensland Fury	EnergyAustralia Stadium, Newcastle
17:00 UTC+11	Tadrosse 24' (o.g.); Song 38'; Petrovski 83'	Report; Summary	Daal 44', 61'	Attendance: 7,026; Referee: (Australia) Gerard Parsons

26 December 2009	Perth Glory	4 : 0	Newcastle Jets	ME Bank Stadium, Perth
17:00 UTC+8	Sekulovski 19'; Harnwell 24', 69'; Sterjovski 36' (pen.)	Report; Summary		Attendance: 9,418; Referee: (Australia) Ben Williams

10 January 2010	Newcastle Jets	3 : 2	Melbourne Victory	EnergyAustralia Stadium, Newcastle
17:00 UTC+11	Kantarovski (yellow card) 22' (yellow-red card) 34'; M. Thompson 26'; Bridges 45'; Haliti 56'	Report; Summary	K. Muscat 35' (pen.); Hernández 90+1'	Attendance: 6,979; Referee: (Australia) Matthew Breeze

13 January 2010	Gold Coast United	2 : 0	Newcastle Jets	Skilled Park, Gold Coast
19:30 UTC+10	Culina 33'; J. Brown 38'	Report; Summary		Attendance: 4,853; Referee: (Australia) Chris Beath

16 January 2010	Brisbane Roar	0 : 2	Newcastle Jets	Suncorp Stadium, Brisbane
20:00 UTC+10		Report; Summary	M. Thompson 50'; Bridges 55' (pen.)	Attendance: 6,656; Referee: (Australia) Matthew Breeze

24 January 2010	Newcastle Jets	1 : 3	Sydney FC	EnergyAustralia Stadium, Newcastle
17:00 UTC+11	Wheelhouse 33'	Report; Summary	Aloisi 45'; Musialik 45+4'; Payne 90+2'	Attendance: 9,892; Referee: (Australia) Peter Green

2 February 2010	North Queensland Fury	2 : 1	Newcastle Jets	Dairy Farmers Stadium, Townsville
19:30 UTC+10	Grossman 39'; Tadrosse 81'	Report; Summary	M. Thompson 19'	Attendance: 4,156; Referee: (Australia) Chris Beath

8 February 2010	Central Coast Mariners	3 : 0	Newcastle Jets	Bluetongue Stadium, Gosford
19:30 UTC+11	Bojic (yellow card) 79' (yellow-red card) 88'; Boogaard 17'; Kwasnik 50'; Simon 72'	Report; Summary	Haliti (yellow card) 49' (yellow-red card) 57'	Attendance: 5,842; Referee: (Australia) Peter Green

12 February 2010	Newcastle Jets	1 : 2	Adelaide United	EnergyAustralia Stadium, Newcastle
20:00 UTC+11	Ali Abbas 41'	Report; Summary	Barbiero 8'; Leckie 74'	Attendance: 6,880; Referee: (Australia) Gerard Parsons

=== 2009–10 Finals series ===
20 February 2010 Semi-Final 3 v 6	Gold Coast United	0 : 0 (a.e.t.)	Newcastle Jets	Skilled Park, Gold Coast
19:00 UTC+10		(5–6 pen.); Report; Summary		Attendance: 4,109; Referee: (Australia) Matthew Breeze
	Penalties
	Culina (penalty scored); Djulbic (penalty scored); Thwaite (penalty scored); Anderson (penalty scored); Smeltz (penalty scored); Rees (penalty missed); Caravella (penalty missed)		(penalty scored) T. Elrich; (penalty scored) Petrovski; (penalty scored) Patafta; (penalty scored) M. Thompson; (penalty scored) Miličević; (penalty missed) Song; (penalty scored) Topor-Stanley

7 March 2010 Minor Semi-Final	Wellington Phoenix	3 : 1 (a.e.t.)	Newcastle Jets	Westpac Stadium, Wellington
16:00 UTC+13	T. Brown 33'; Ifill 105+1'; Dadi 115'	Report; Summary	M. Thompson 20'	Attendance: 32,792; Referee: (Australia) Chris Beath

Pos	Team	Pld	W	D	L	GF	GA	GD	Pts	Qualification
1	Sydney FC (C)	27	15	3	9	35	23	+12	48	Qualification for 2011 AFC Champions League group stage and Finals series
2	Melbourne Victory	27	14	5	8	47	32	+15	47	Qualification for 2011 AFC Champions League group stage and Finals series
3	Gold Coast United	27	13	5	9	39	35	+4	44	Qualification for Finals series
4	Wellington Phoenix	27	10	10	7	37	29	+8	40	Qualification for Finals series
5	Perth Glory	27	11	6	10	40	34	+6	39	Qualification for Finals series
6	Newcastle Jets	27	10	4	13	33	45	−12	34	Qualification for Finals series
7	North Queensland Fury	27	8	8	11	29	46	−17	32	
8	Central Coast Mariners	27	7	9	11	32	29	+3	30	
9	Brisbane Roar	27	8	6	13	32	42	−10	30	
10	Adelaide United	27	7	8	12	24	33	−9	29	

Source: ultimatealeague.com
Rules for classification: 1) points; 2) goal difference; 3) number of goals scored.
(C) Champions

== Statistics ==
=== Goal scorers ===
Name	A-League	Finals	ACL	Total
(England) Michael Bridges	6	0	0	6
(Australia) Matt Thompson	6	0	0	6
(Kosovo) Labinot Haliti	5	0	0	5
(Australia) Sasho Petrovski	2	0	3	5
(South Korea) Song Jin-Hyung	4	0	0	4
(Australia) Jason Hoffman	2	0	1	3
(Australia) Sean Rooney	2	0	1	3
(Australia) Tarek Elrich	0	0	1	1
(Australia) Jason Naidovski	1	0	0	1
(Australia) Jobe Wheelhouse	1	0	0	1
