= List of Newcastle Jets FC players (1–24 appearances) =

Newcastle Jets Football Club is an Australian professional association football club based in Newcastle, New South Wales. The club was formed in 2000 as Newcastle United, and played their first competitive match in October 2000, when they entered the First Round of the 2000–01 National Soccer League. The club was renamed Newcastle Jets in 2004. Since Newcastle Jets' first competitive match, more than 150 players have failed to reach 25 appearances for the club.

== Key ==
- The list is ordered first by date of debut, and then if necessary in alphabetical order.
- Appearances as a substitute are included.
- Statistics are correct up to and including the match played on 25 July 2024. Where a player left the club permanently after this date, his statistics are updated to his date of leaving.

Positions key
GK	Goalkeeper
DF	Defender
MF	Midfielder
FW	Forward

Nationality
Unless otherwise noted, the nationality of a player is determined by the country/countries which he has played for, or if said person has not played international football, their country of birth.
Position
Playing positions are listed according to the tactical formations that were employed at the time.
Club career
Club career is defined as the first and last calendar years in which the player appeared for the club in any of the competitions listed below.
Total appearances and Total goals
Total appearances and goals comprise those in the National Soccer League, A-League Men, Australia Cup, A-League Pre-Season Challenge Cup, AFC Champions League and the 2005 Australian Club World Championship Qualifying Tournament.

== Players ==
Players highlighted in bold are still actively playing at Newcastle Jets.

List of Newcastle Jets FC players with between 1 and 24 appearances
Player	Nationality	Pos	Club career	Starts	Subs	Total	Goals	Ref.
Player	Nationality	Pos	Club career	Appearances			Goals	Ref.
Anthony Surjan	Australia	FW	2000–2002	13	11	24	3	
Brad Swancott	Australia	GK	2000	3	1	4	0	
Vasko Trpcevski	Australia	MF	2000–2001	8	11	19	1	
Brad Wieczorek	Australia	FW	2000–2001	11	2	13	0	
Peter Juchniewicz	Australia	FW	2000–2001	7	12	19	2	
James Kemp	Australia	DF	2000–2001	4	1	5	0	
Anthony Magnacca	Australia	MF	2000–2001	8	1	9	0	
Andy Harper	Australia	FW	2001	13	4	17	3	
Chad Mansley	Australia	FW	2001	0	3	3	1	
Michael Prentice	Australia	DF	2001–2004	15	5	20	0	
John Majurovski	Australia	FW	2001	0	1	1	0	
Tallan Martin	Australia	FW	2001	0	1	1	0	
Alex Moreira	Brazil	FW	2002–2003	5	14	19	4	
Adam Hughes	Australia	MF	2002–2003	3	7	10	1	
Daniel Ciarrocchi	Australia	MF	2003	0	1	1	0	
Thomas Libbesson	Australia	MF	2003–2004	4	10	14	1	
Peter McPherson	Australia	MF	2003–2005	4	8	12	0	
Damien Brown	Australia	MF	2003	13	0	13	0	
Greg Owens	Australia	MF	2003–2004	12	4	16	2	
Craig Deans	Australia	DF	2003–2005	22	2	24	2	
Mitchell Wallace	Australia	MF	2003–2004	1	4	5	0	
Keegan Wolfenden	Australia	DF	2003–2004	4	3	7	0	
John Perosh	Australia	GK	2003	9	0	9	0	
Joel Theissen	Australia	MF	2004	2	2	4	0	
Jason Cowburn	Australia	MF	2004	0	1	1	0	
Guy Bates	England	FW	2005	4	3	7	0	
Richard Johnson	Australia	DF	2005–2006	24	0	24	3	
Ante Milicic	Australia	FW	2005–2006	21	0	21	7	
Franco Parisi	Australia	FW	2005–2006	2	11	13	2	
Allan Picken	Australia	DF	2005–2006	24	0	24	0	
Mateo Corbo	Uruguay	DF	2005–2006	18	0	18	0	
Brett Studman	Australia	DF	2005	0	1	1	0	
James Monie	Australia	FW	2005	1	1	2	0	
Paul Okon	Australia	DF	2006–2007	22	0	22	0	
Troy Hearfield	Australia	DF	2006–2008	10	10	20	0	
Tolgay Ozbey	Australia	FW	2006	1	8	9	0	
Shane Webb	Australia	DF	2006	1	2	3	0	
Steven Old	New Zealand	DF	2006	2	7	9	0	
Milton Rodríguez	Colombia	FW	2006–2007	15	6	21	7	
Tim Brown	New Zealand	MF	2006–2007	6	4	10	1	
Ivan Necevski	Australia	GK	2006	2	1	3	0	
Scott Tunbridge	Australia	FW	2007–2008	7	3	10	2	
Jorge Drovandi	Argentina	FW	2007	0	2	2	0	
Denni	Brazil	FW	2007–2008	16	3	19	1	
Mário Jardel	Brazil	FW	2007	3	8	11	0	
Stephen Laybutt	Australia	DF	2007–2008	7	3	10	0	
James Holland	Australia	MF	2007–2008	21	2	23	3	
Beau Busch	Australia	DF	2008	2	0	2	0	
Antun Kovacic	Australia	DF	2008	5	4	9	1	
Jason Naidovski	Australia	FW	2008–2009	9	2	11	1	
Jarrad Ross	Australia	DF	2008–2009	0	4	4	0	
Jesper Håkansson	Denmark	MF	2008	6	5	11	0	
Edmundo Zura	Ecuador	FW	2008	7	2	9	0	
Daniel Piorkowski	Australia	DF	2008	5	2	7	0	
Mark Milligan	Australia	DF	2008–2009	11	0	11	1	
Shaun Ontong	Australia	DF	2008–2009	1	4	5	0	
Brodie Mooy	Australia	MF	2009–2010	6	6	12	0	
Jesse Pinto	Timor-Leste	MF	2009	0	3	3	0	
Donny de Groot	Netherlands	FW	2009	6	3	9	0	
Fabio Vignaroli	Italy	MF	2009	19	1	20	0	
Joel Wood	Australia	FW	2009	0	1	1	0	
Angelo Costanzo	Australia	DF	2009–2010	10	9	19	0	
Chris Triantis	Australia	MF	2009	3	0	3	0	
Neil Young	Australia	GK	2009–2010	9	0	9	0	
Scott Balderson	Australia	MF	2010	0	1	1	0	
Mirjan Pavlovic	Australia	FW	2010	1	2	3	0	
Zhang Shuo	China	FW	2010–2011	4	4	8	0	
Marcello Fiorentini	Italy	MF	2010–2011	8	8	16	0	
Matthew Nash	Australia	GK	2010–2012	11	2	13	0	
Tomislav Misura	Slovenia	FW	2010	1	0	1	0	
Mario Simic	Australia	DF	2011–2012	3	2	5	0	
Chris Payne	Australia	FW	2011	0	1	1	0	
Dominik Ritter	Australia	DF	2012–2013	18	0	18	0	
Bernardo Ribeiro	Brazil	MF	2012–2013	3	2	5	0	
Mitchell Oxborrow	Australia	MF	2012–2014	1	5	6	0	
Nathan Burns	Australia	FW	2013–2014	12	0	12	2	
Joey Gibbs	Australia	MF	2013–2014	0	4	4	0	
Nick Ward	Australia	MF	2014	2	4	6	0	
Sam Gallagher	Australia	DF	2014–2015	14	6	20	0	
Brandon Lundy	Australia	FW	2014–2015	1	4	5	0	
Adrian Madaschi	Australia	DF	2014–2015	11	0	11	0	
Jerónimo Neumann	Argentina	FW	2014–2015	5	9	14	3	
Jonathan Steele	Northern Ireland	MF	2014	3	0	3	0	
Marcos Flores	Argentina	MF	2014	4	2	6	1	
Allan Welsh	Australia	DF	2014–2015	11	5	16	0	
Billy Celeski	Australia	MF	2014	4	0	4	0	
Radovan Pavicevic	Australia	FW	2015–2016	1	16	17	1	
Lee Ki-je	South Korea	DF	2015	20	1	21	2	
Braedyn Crowley	Australia	FW	2015–2016	1	9	10	0	
Max Burgess	Australia	MF	2015	0	5	5	0	
Michael Kantarovski	Australia	MF	2015	0	1	1	0	
Travis Cooper	Australia	FW	2015	0	2	2	0	
Cameron Watson	Australia	MF	2015–2016	13	5	18	0	
Leonardo Santiago	Brazil	FW	2015–2016	18	2	20	1	
Miloš Trifunović	Serbia	FW	2015–2016	22	0	22	9	
Ryan Kitto	Australia	MF	2015–2016	12	6	18	0	
Andy Brennan	Australia	FW	2016	1	4	5	0	
Kristian Brymora	Australia	FW	2016	0	2	2	0	
Devante Clut	Australia	MF	2016–2018	9	15	24	1	
Aleksandr Kokko	Finland	FW	2016–2017	7	6	13	1	
Iain Fyfe	Australia	DF	2016	3	0	3	0	
Ma Leilei	China	MF	2016–2017	7	8	15	1	
Harry Sawyer	Australia	FW	2017	1	4	5	0	
Joel Allwright	Australia	MF	2017	0	2	2	0	
Tomislav Arcaba	Australia	GK	2017	2	0	2	0	
Mario Shabow	Australia	MF	2017–2018	0	7	7	0	
Patito Rodríguez	Argentina	FW	2018	6	6	12	1	
Riley McGree	Australia	MF	2018	9	3	12	5	
Mitch Austin	Australia	FW	2018–2019	0	5	5	0	
Jair	Brazil	FW	2018–2019	16	4	20	2	
Jake Adelson	Australia	DF	2019	0	1	1	0	
Kwabena Appiah	New Zealand	FW	2019	0	2	2	1	
Patrick Langlois	Australia	MF	2019–2020	5	5	10	1	
Jack Simmons	Australia	MF	2019	0	2	2	0	
Abdiel Arroyo	Panama	FW	2019–2020	16	4	20	3	
Nick Fitzgerald	Australia	FW	2019–2020	17	6	23	4	
Wes Hoolahan	Republic of Ireland	MF	2019–2020	4	3	7	1	
Bobby Burns	Northern Ireland	DF	2019–2020	12	4	16	0	
Maki Petratos	Australia	FW	2019–2021	0	7	7	0	
Bernie Ibini-Isei	Australia	FW	2020	3	3	6	1	
Joe Ledley	Wales	MF	2020	1	5	6	0	
**Noah James**	Australia	GK	2020–	1	0	1	0	
Ramy Najjarine	Australia	FW	2020–2021	12	3	15	0	
Tete Yengi	Australia	FW	2020–2021	0	9	9	0	
Blake Archbold	Australia	FW	2021–2022	0	7	7	0	
Luka Prso	Australia	MF	2021	14	3	17	1	
Archie Goodwin	Australia	FW	2021–2024	6	41	47	9	
Apostolos Stamatelopoulos	Australia	FW	2021; 2023–2024	34	4	38	20	
Liridon Krasniqi	Malaysia	MF	2021	0	9	9	0	
Syahrian Abimanyu	Indonesia	MF	2021	0	3	3	0	
Jordan O'Doherty	Australia	MF	2021–2022	14	10	24	0	
Eli Babalj	Australia	FW	2021–2022	1	10	11	1	
Olivier Boumal	Cameroon	FW	2021–2022	19	2	21	4	
Savvas Siatravanis	Greece	FW	2021–2022	13	7	20	2	
Samuel Silvera	Australia	FW	2021–2022	6	15	21	1	
Riley Warland	Australia	DF	2021–2022	4	8	12	0	
Dylan Murnane	Australia	DF	2021–2022	8	12	20	1	
Mario Arqués	Spain	MF	2021–2022	8	6	14	0	
Michael Weier	Australia	GK	2022–2024	18	0	18	0	
Brandon Wilson	Australia	MF	2022	9	3	12	0	
Rory Jordan	Australia	FW	2022	0	1	1	0	
James McGarry	New Zealand	DF	2022–2023	7	4	11	1	
Jaushua Sotirio	Australia	FW	2022–2023	17	7	24	3	
Beka Dartsmelia	Georgia	MF	2022–2023	11	7	18	1	
Moonib Adus	Australia	FW	2022	0	1	1	0	
Manabu Saitō	Japan	FW	2023	4	4	8	1	
**Lachlan Bayliss**	New Zealand	MF	2023–	7	6	13	0	
Jason Berthomier	France	MF	2023–2024	2	5	7	0	
**Jacob Dowse**	Australia	MF	2023–2025	0	1	1	0	
**Justin Vidic**	Australia	FW	2023–2025	1	4	5	1	
**Nathan Grimaldi**	Australia	DF	2024–2025	5	3	8	1	
**Matthew Scarcella**	Australia	MF	2024–2025	1	0	1	0	
**Lachlan Rose**	Australia	FW	2024–	1	0	1	0	
**Eli Adams**	Australia	FW	2024–	0	1	1	0	
**Aleksandar Šušnjar**	Australia	DF	2024–	0	1	1	0	
**Christian Bracco**	Australia	MF	2024–	0	1	1	0	
**Alex Nunes**	Australia	MF	2024–	0	1	1	0	
