= History of Newcastle Jets FC =

The History of the Newcastle Jets FC starts at their inception in 2000 by businessman Con Constantine after the collapse of the city's previous football club the Newcastle Breakers. The Breakers were dissolved when Soccer Australia revoked its NSL licence at the conclusion of the 1999/2000 season. At the formation of Newcastle United the home ground was moved back to where Newcastle KB United played, now known as EnergyAustralia Stadium.

== 2000–09 ==
=== Pre A-League Years ===
Newcastle United Strip 2000–04

The club originally played in the NSL, where they were quite competitive, competing in two of four finals series and finishing second behind Perth Glory in the 2001–02 season. The club during the NSL wore what could be considered traditional sporting colors of blue and red, which was also worn by the Newcastle Knights Rugby league team.

=== NSL history ===
Brackets indicate statistics including NSL finals.

Newcastle United FC NSL History
| Season | P | W | D | L | F | A | Teams | Minor Ladder Position | Finals Position |
|---|---|---|---|---|---|---|---|---|---|
| 2000–01 | 28 | 7 | 9 | 14 | 37 | 56 | 16 | 14th | DNQ |
| 2001–02 | 24 (27) | 10 (11) | 12 | 2 (4) | 33 (36) | 21 (26) | 13 | 2nd | Preliminary Final |
| 2002–03 | 24 (33) | 10 (12) | 7 (8) | 7 (13) | 37 (46) | 25 (42) | 13 | 4th | 6th† |
| 2003–04 | 24 | 6 | 6 | 12 | 18 | 33 | 13 | 11th | DNQ |
| Totals | 100 (112) | 33 (36) | 34 (35) | 35 (43) | 125 (137) | 135 (157) | | 2nd* | Preliminary Final** |

* Shows the best league finish achieved
** Shows the best finals finish achieved
† For the 2002–03 season, a round robin contest between the top six was undertaken to see who would be Grand Finalists. Newcastle were placed sixth and last in this competition, although a washed out game against Northern Spirit was never played as it did not affect the outcome of the top two.

=== A-League ===
The club renamed and re-badged themselves the Newcastle United Jets Football Club at the start of the new national league, the A-League. This was done to try and create and project a new image of the club and to avoid confusion with the Premier League club Newcastle United. The name "Jets" is a reference to RAAF Base Williamtown, located just 20 kilometres north of Newcastle. The club's logo depicts three F/A-18 Hornets, which the Royal Australian Air Force has based at Williamtown.

Former England and Australia manager Terry Venables was reported as favourite to become the team's technical director, including reports from the Jets, but this was confirmed by Venables' agent as a 'no-go'. Instead, the club signed Richard Money for the 2005–06 season. In 2006 Money was replaced with Nick Theodorakopoulos after Money returned to England to take the manager's job at Walsall. In October 2006 after recording no wins during the Pre-Season Cup and during the first seven rounds of A-League matches, Theodorakopoulos became the first coach to be sacked in the club's A-League's history. His assistant Gary Van Egmond was the caretaker coach for the remainder of the 2005–6 season, and later signed a contract to remain as the coach of the Jets for the next three years.

The club surprised many observers in the Australian game by signing Ned Zelic, a player who was seen to have severed connections with Australia after being dropped from the national team.

Reports suggested the Jets were attempting to bring former Liverpool and England striker Stan Collymore out of retirement. Director of Football Remo Nogarotto confirmed the club had made a bid to lure Collymore to the A-League for a four-match guest stint; however, the move had broken down within 24 hours of it being made public.

Under the management of Gary Van Egmond Newcastle has achieved the highest number of points out of all clubs in their last fourteen games and have also scored the most goals. As a result of their good form under Van Egmond, crowds in Newcastle have reached all time highs for football – culminating in a crowd of over 24,000 for their home final against Sydney FC on 2 February 2007.

Newcastle were eventually eliminated in the preliminary final by Adelaide, the game going to penalties after finishing at 1 all. Vaughan Coveny and Stuart Musialik missed their attempts in a shoot-out that ended up at 4–3 in favour of Adelaide, costing Newcastle their place in the grand final and a berth in the Asian Champions League.

=== 2007–08 ===
Version 3 of the A-League saw a number of Newcastle's biggest stars of the previous season leave the club. Captain Paul Okon retired, fan favourite Milton Rodriguez returned to Colombia and Johnny Warren Medal winner Nick Carle moved to Turkey to link up with Gençlerbirliği S.K. New recruits included Joel Griffiths' twin brother Adam and previous European Golden Boot winner Mario Jardel. Although significant excitement surrounded the capture of Jardel, as time went by it was obvious he was well past his prime and received little game time. Throughout the season star striker Joel Griffiths broke the record for most goals in a regular season by scoring 12 in 21 rounds.

The Jets started the season well without losing in their first 5 matches. Following this good start the Jets struggled for consistency until the end of the season, often winning against quality opposition but losing some vital home games. Wins in the last three competition rounds saw the Jets move up the ladder to equal points with the Central Coast Mariners, finishing the season in second place due to inferior goal difference. The Jets went on to play the Mariners in the two legged Major Semi Final. The Jets won the first leg at home 2–0 thanks to a first-half header from Adam Griffiths and a late penalty from his brother Joel. The game had its fair share of controversy as Mariners striker John Aloisi had a seemingly legitimate goal disallowed and also missed a penalty.

Steeled by the defeat in the first leg, the Mariners overturned the 2–0 deficit and led 2–0 at the end of 90 minutes of the second leg thanks to goals from Sasho Petrovski and Adam Kwasnik. Seven minutes into extra time Petrovski scored again to send the Mariners into their second Grand Final in three years.

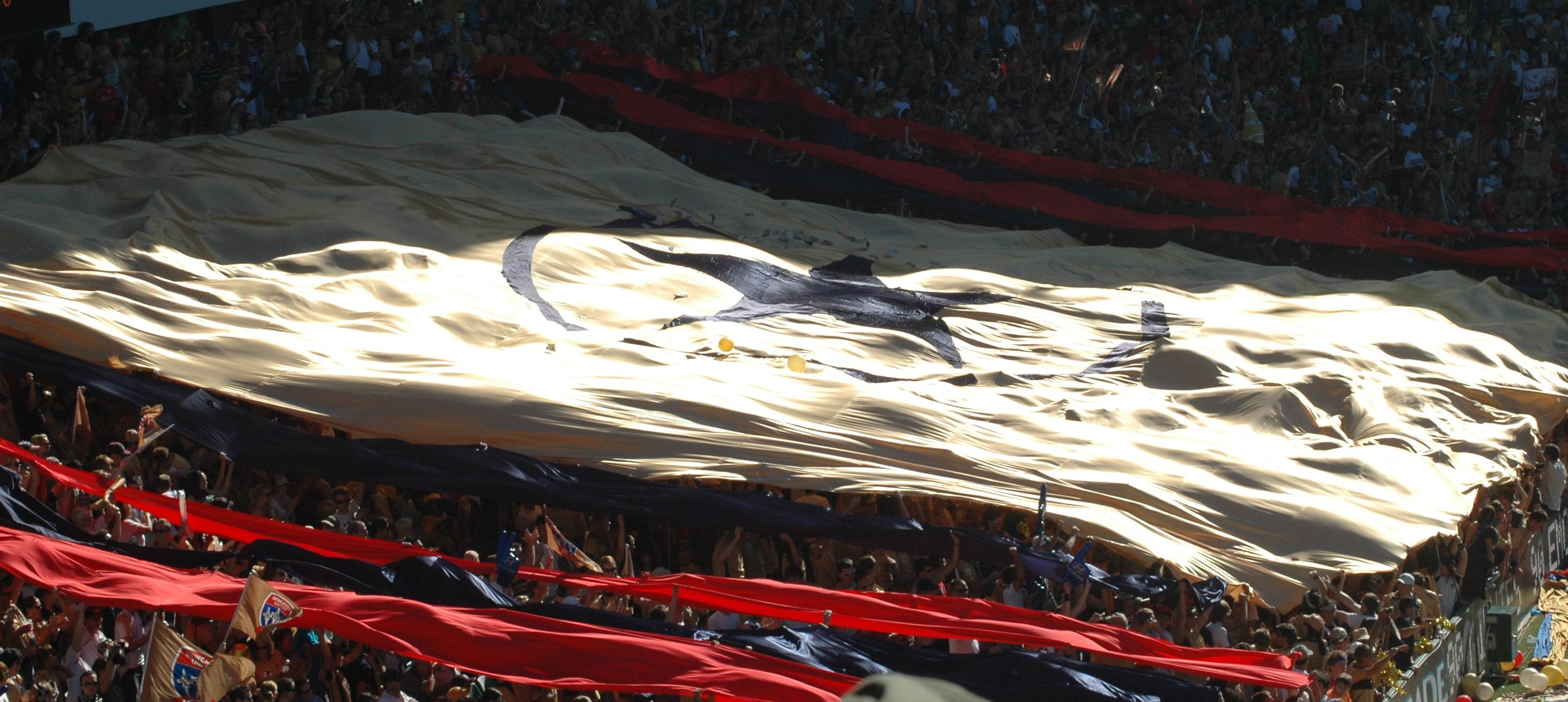
Newcastle Jets Squadron Banner before the 2007–08 Grand Final

The Jets qualified for their first A-League Grand Final by beating Queensland Roar 3–2 after extra time in the 2008 Preliminary Final on 17 February 2008. The Jets led 1–0 until deep into injury time when the Roar were awarded a penalty which Reinaldo successfully converted, sending the match into extra time. A few minutes into extra time the Jets were awarded a penalty as well, as Song Jin-Hyung was brought down in the box. Joel Griffiths was successful from the spot to restore the 1-goal advantage and a few moments later Tarek Elrich sealed passage into the Grand Final with a well timed shot to score his first A-League goal. Although the Roar received another late penalty it was too late to stop the Jets' march into the Grand Final.

The Jets defeated the Central Coast Mariners in the 2007–08 A-League Grand Final, becoming A-League Champions for the first time.

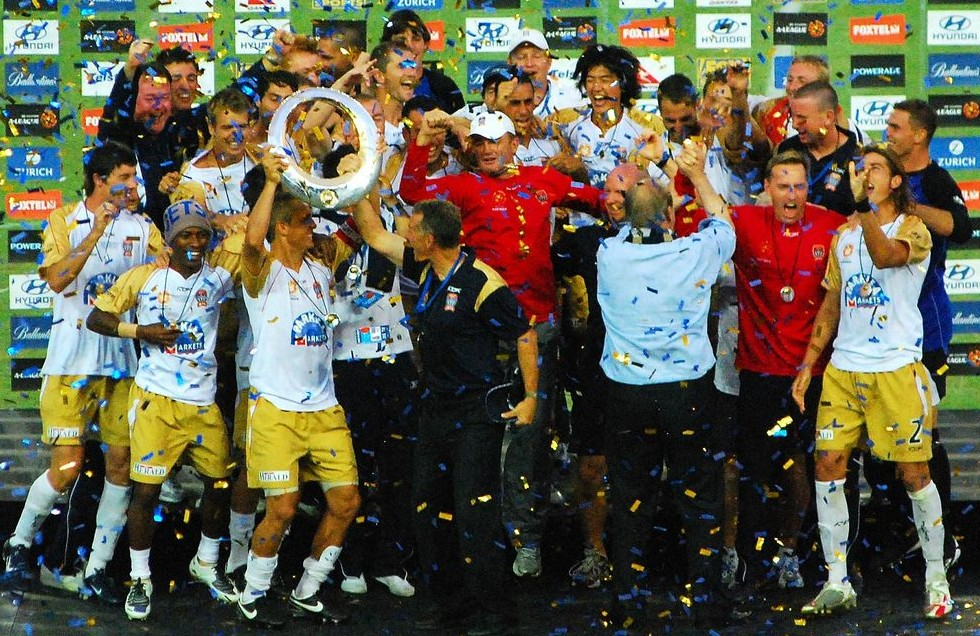

The game was sealed with a solitary Joel Griffiths strike early in the second half. In his last game of professional football Tony Vidmar made a mistake near the halfway line to gift Griffiths with an opportunity which he grasped with both hands. The game was marred by a late penalty appeal for handball. Mariners goal keeper Danny Vukovic had come up for the corner and was so infuriated by Mark Shield's clearly incorrect decision that he slapped his hand away, earning himself a lengthy ban and ruling himself out of the early rounds of next season. Both the Jets and Mariners qualified to take part in the 2009 AFC Champions League.

=== 2008–09 ===
After the success of the 2007–08 season a number of Jets players left the club including Mark Bridge and Stuart Musialik to Sydney FC and Joe Marston Medal winner Andrew Durante and Troy Hearfield to Wellington Phoenix. Although rumours persisted about captain Jade North and Adam Griffiths wishing to leave the club after being a part of the Socceroos squad that faced Singapore and China, both chose to remain with the Jets for the 2008–09 season.

Most players who left the Jets suggested wage demands as the major issue with Jets owner Con Constantine refusing to allow players to utilise service agreements which would allow more flexibility under the salary cap.

Forward Jason Naidovski was the first new player to sign on for the Jets for season 2008–09, arriving from the Australian Institute of Sport followed by right sided midfielder Shaun Ontong from Adelaide United, and exciting under 20's Australian representative Kaz Patafta from Benfica. Defender Antun Kovacic soon followed as well as international recruits Jesper Håkansson and Edmundo Zura, who signed as the marquee player for season 2008–09.

The Jets began the season with the Pre Season Cup where two draws and a loss saw them finish third in their group behind Melbourne Victory and Adelaide United.

The regular season proved to be a disaster for the Jets. The Jets won only four out of twenty one matches and were rooted to the bottom of the ladder, missing the finals for the first time and collecting their first wooden spoon. Adding to this were Gary van Egmond's touchline ban after storming on to the pitch following a 2 – 2 draw with Perth, marquee signing Edmundo Zura leaving the club after visa issues failed to bring his family from Ecuador, suspensions for Joel Griffiths and Mark Milligan and high-profile player Adam Griffiths agreeing to terms for season 2009–10 with expansion club Gold Coast United Football Club. The Jets attempted to sign superstar Dwight Yorke to replace Zura as marquee player for the rest of the season but this move was scuppered by his international commitments with Trinidad and Tobago. Jade North had originally agreed to sign for North Queensland Fury for season 2009–10 but instead accepted an offer to play for Korean side Incheon United, meaning that he left at the beginning of the January transfer window, with Joel Griffiths taking over the captaincy. Exciting Youngster James Holland also departed for a lucrative deal at Dutch powerhouse club AZ Alkmaar. In December 2008, the Jets announced they had signed the 37-year-old Spencer Prior for the remainder of the 2008–2009 season.

Despite the Jets winning their last home game against Perth Glory a number of fans were involved in an ugly incident with club chairman Con Constantine who took offense to two actions from fans. Firstly, the Squadron fan group hung their banners upside down as a silent protest of the poor season, and secondly, an unaffiliated fan had a banner stating "Newcastle Jets: We've been Conned", insinuating that the club's poor performances on the field are a direct result of the chairman's management of the club. In response Constatine ordered five of the senior members of the Squadron up to his private box and verbally abused them, even threatening to throw Squadron president, Tim Verschelden, off the balcony and banning him and others from future Jets games. The FFA are currently conducting a probe into the incident, although regardless of the outcome it seems that relationships between management and fans was at an all-time low by the end of the season.

=== Asian Champions League ===
In order to rebuild the team for the Champions League the Jets, very much in need of several new players, signed Perth defender Nikolai Topor-Stanley in early January 2008. But the signing of Topor-Stanley would prove to be the Jets' sole gain on the transfer market for several weeks, and fans grew even more disgruntled as the Jets were confirmed as the 2009 A-League "Wooden Spooners" with a 2–0 loss to Adelaide United in mid-January. An encouraging 2–1 win over Perth Glory in the Jets' final home game of the A-League 2008-09 season lightened the mood somewhat, but when the Jets crashed in a 4–0 capitulation at the Sydney Football Stadium the following week, things were looking grim. And the picture only grew bleaker as the notorious player exodus continued and the club lost Socceroos defender Mark Milligan to Shanghai Shenhua, along with Jesper Hakansson, who left the club after agreeing to a mutual termination. Talisman and captain Joel Griffiths also agreed to move to Asia, although only on a one-year loan to Beijing Guoan.

The first ten days of February saw the Jets engage in a surprisingly successful flurry of transfer activity to bolster their squad for the impending Champions League before 11 February date by which clubs are required to submit their squad lists. Acting on an urgent need to improve their attacking stocks, the Jets announced simultaneously the signing of Dutchman Donny de Groot from De Graafschap along with former Sydney FC and Mariners striker Sasho Petrovski. Next, the Jets reinforced their shaky defence by obtaining the signatures of talented former FC Thun and Victory defender Ljubo Miličević, who had been battling depression since being released by the Victory, veteran centre-back Angelo Costanzo from Adelaide United, and young Sydney FC left-back Nikolas Tsattalios. These signings were followed by the surprise announcement that the Jets had secured the services of former S.S. Lazio forward Fabio Vignaroli on a six-month contract. In a further boost for the depth of its squad, the club signed three local footballers on six-month deals with the option for an extension into the A-League 2009-10 season: former Newcastle United midfielder Mitchell Johnson and strikers Peter Haynes and Joel Wood.

After the departure of high performance manager Ian Crook, the Jets signed former Sydney FC boss Branko Culina as their new Technical Director.

The Jets got off to a bad start, losing 2–0 to Beijing Guoan in Beijing. However, they rebounded with a 2–0 defeat of Ulsan Hyundai Horang-i back in Newcastle. After a heroic 1–1 draw in Japan against Nagoya Grampus, they lost 1–0 in the return fixture. Then, on 6 May, the Jets grabbed two goals in the last two minutes to defeat Beijing in Newcastle 2–1. The Jets qualified for the last 16 by defeating Ulsan Hyundai 1–0 away from home with Jason Hoffman scoring his debut goal to seal the win. The Jets faced Pohang Steelers in their round of 16 fixture on 24 June, crashing out of the competition 6–0 to the hands of the South Koreans.

=== 2009–10 ===
Preparations for the new season were thrown into turmoil when championship winning manager Gary van Egmond left the club for a lucrative job with the AIS. This has subsequently created a public rift between the club and FFA over the possible FFA's involvement in inducing Van Egmond to break his contract to take up the new position. The relationship between owner and FFA fell to the point where the club has threatened legal action against both Van Egmond and the FFA for breach of contract. Former club Technical Director Branko Čulina was named as his replacement on 30 June 2009.

The club began the season with a victory for the first time, downing Wellington Phoenix at home, followed by string of good results including being the first team to defeat A-League newcomers Gold Coast United. Following this victory though a run of poor results followed. The Jets were able to dominate large portions of matches but were unable to translate that dominance to the scoreboard.

In the 2009–10 season, the Newcastle Jets qualified for The Finals Series, coming 6th in the regular season. In the first week of the finals the Jets came up against Gold Coast United at Skilled Stadium. The Jets unexpectedly defeated Gold Coast in a Penalty Shoot Out 6 goals to 5 with the Full Time Score being 0–0. In the second week they were up against Wellington Phoenix at Westpac Stadium. The full-time Score was 1–1 bringing the match into extra-time. In Extra Time Paul Iffil scored the match winner for Wellington followed by a goal from Eugene Dadi. This put the Jets out of the competition.

=== 2005–2010 history ===
Brackets indicate statistics including A-League finals.

Newcastle United Jets A-League History
| Season | P | W | D | L | F | A | Teams | Minor Ladder Position | Finals Position | ACL Qualification | ACL Placing |
|---|---|---|---|---|---|---|---|---|---|---|---|
| 2005–06 | 21 (23) | 9 (9) | 4 (5) | 8 (9) | 27 (28) | 29 (31) | 8 | 4th | Minor Semi-Final | DNQ | n/a |
| 2006–07 | 21 (24) | 8 (9) | 6 (6) | 7 (9) | 32 (36) | 30 (33) | 8 | 3rd | Preliminary Final | DNQ | DNQ |
| 2007–08 | 21 (25) | 9 (12) | 7 (7) | 5 (6) | 25 (31) | 21 (26) | 8 | 2nd | Champions | Qualified for 2009 | DNQ |
| 2008–09 | 21 | 4 | 6 | 11 | 21 | 39 | 8 | 8th | DNQ | DNQ | Round of 16 |
| 2009–10 | 27 (29) | 10 (10) | 4 (5) | 13 (14) | 33 (34) | 45 (48) | 10 | 6th | Minor Semi-Final | DNQ | DNQ |
| Totals | 111 (122) | 40 (44) | 27 (29) | 44 (49) | 138 (149) | 202 (212) | | | Champions* | 1** | Round of 16* |

* Shows the best finish achieved ** Shows number of qualifications

== 2010–present ==
=== 2010–2012 ===
The 2010–11 season was the Newcastle Jets' tenth season in the national football competition in Australia. The Jets opened their Season with a 0–0 draw against Adelaide United at Hindmarsh Stadium on 5 August. It was announced on 22 July 2010 that Michael Bridges would be the Newcastle Jets senior team captain, with Ljubo Miličević as his deputy.

Prior to Newcastle's round 4 game against Brisbane Roar, it was revealed that the club was under significant financial stress and was unable to pay staff and player wages on time. This resulted in the club seeking either a loan or an advance on their quarterly share of the A-League television deal. It was announced by the club and Football Federation Australia that the governing body would give a short term assistance package, making sure the club made it through their next few games and back into financial viability.

After weeks of speculation about the future of the Newcastle Jets it was announced by the FFA on 22 September, before the teams midweek game against Gold Coast United, that mining magnate Nathan Tinkler would be buying a majority share in the Jets, saving the club from ruin. Tinkler had a positive influence at the Jets. A new price for tickets included a free season pass for children younger than 15, a family pass for 11 home games with reserved grandstand for $100 and general admission for $10.

The club gained the Hunter Medical Research Institute as a new sponsor, whose logo appeared on the front of the players shirts. The Institute said it would donate $5000 for every goal scored at home and $2500 for an away goal. The club set up a new administration office, extended the contract of coach Branko Culina until March 2015, and unveiled a $2.5 million blueprint for the football department. It was confirmed that the Jets would host the Los Angeles Galaxy, which included big name players such as David Beckham and Landon Donovan, for a friendly in November 2010 at Energy Australia Stadium. The Jets won the match 2–1.

After the departure of former Assistant Coach Mark Jones, the Jets welcomed new faces David Lowe and Marshall Sopor, while Clint Gosling moved from a part-time to full-time role as goalkeeping coach. Lowe's position involved identifying talent from throughout the local area and around the country in order to improve the club's development of youngsters through their National Youth League side and Soper, a former Qantas Socceroo, takes up a new position of specialist skills coach.

The Jet's announced the signing of Ryan Griffiths, during the January transfer window for the remainder of the season and the 2011–2012 season. Ryan is the brother of Newcastle Jets legend Joel Griffiths. With the North Queensland Fury's future in doubt the Newcastle Jets signed Chris Payne for the 2011–2012 season. 16 December 2010 marked the inaugural meeting of the new Football Advisory Board put in place by new owner Nathan Tinkler, The board included prominent names from Newcastle footballing history, Community members, and the President of Northern NSW Football. The Jets finished the 2010–11 Season in 7th position narrowly missing out on the Finals series on the final matchday of the regular season. As of October 2011, the Jets had 9000 club members.

In April 2012, Nathan Tinkler announced that he would hand back the Newcastle Jets A-league licence to the FFA, due to his mounting financial difficulties. The Federation said that Tinkler's Hunter Sports Group could not just hand back its licence, and was breaching a binding contract by walking away from the Jets. On 1 May, after face-to-face talks between Tinkler and FFA chairman Frank Lowy, it was announced that Tinkler would remain the owner of the club.

Coaches Clayton Zane 2013–2014 A league Season. Gary Van Egmond 2011–2013 A League Season Culina
