= A-League transfers for 2008–09 season =

Australian football transfers for the 2008–09 A-League

This is a list of Australian soccer transfers for the 2008–09 A-League. Only moves featuring at least one A-League club are listed.

Clubs were able to sign players at any time, but many transfers will only officially go through on 1 June because the majority of player contracts finish on 31 May.

== Transfers ==
All players without a flag are Australian. Clubs without a flag are clubs participating in the A-League.

=== Pre-season ===
Date	Name	Moving from	Moving to
12 January 2008	Ben Kantarovski	(Australia) Broadmeadow Magic	Newcastle Jets
18 January 2008	Steven O'Dor	Wellington Phoenix	Unattached
19 January 2008	Richie Alagich	Adelaide United	Retired
21 January 2008	Nathan Elasi	(Australia) Marconi Stallions	Melbourne Victory
24 January 2008	(New Zealand) Leo Bertos	Perth Glory	Wellington Phoenix
29 January 2008	(Netherlands) Bobby Petta	Adelaide United	Unattached
30 January 2008	David Zdrilic	Sydney FC	Unattached
6 February 2008	Billy Celeski	Perth Glory	Melbourne Victory
7 February 2008	Adrian Caceres	Melbourne Victory	Central Coast Mariners
11 February 2008	Dez Giraldi	Adelaide United	Unattached
11 February 2008	Daniel Mullen	(Australia) AIS	Adelaide United
12 February 2008	Ufuk Talay	Sydney FC	(Japan) Avispa Fukuoka
14 February 2008	Tony Vidmar	Central Coast Mariners	Retired
20 February 2008	Sasa Ognenovski	Queensland Roar	Adelaide United
22 February 2008	Ljubo Milicevic	Melbourne Victory	Unattached
28 February 2008	Tom Pondeljak	Central Coast Mariners	Melbourne Victory
28 February 2008	Andrew Durante	Newcastle Jets	Wellington Phoenix
28 February 2008	Jonathan McKain	(Romania) Politehnica Timișoara	Wellington Phoenix
28 February 2008	Tim Smits	(Australia) Rochedale Rovers	Brisbane Roar
28 February 2008	David Dodd	(Australia) Palm Beach	Brisbane Roar
29 February 2008	Kristian Rees	Wellington Phoenix	Unattached
29 February 2008	(Brazil) Felipe	Wellington Phoenix	Unattached
3 March 2008	John Aloisi	Central Coast Mariners	Sydney FC
3 March 2008	Simon Colosimo	Perth Glory	Sydney FC
3 March 2008	Mark Bridge	Newcastle Jets	Sydney FC
4 March 2008	Royce Brownlie	Wellington Phoenix	Unattached
6 March 2008	Stephen Eagleton	Newcastle Jets	Retired
9 March 2008	Ahmad Elrich	Wellington Phoenix	Central Coast Mariners
12 March 2008	Stuart Musialik	Newcastle Jets	Sydney FC
12 March 2008	Mark Milligan	Sydney FC	Unattached
18 March 2008	(China) Gao Leilei	Unattached	Wellington Phoenix
18 March 2008	Ben Vidaic	Sydney FC	Sydney United
23 March 2008	(Ivory Coast) Eugène Dadi	Unattached	Perth Glory
27 March 2008	(New Zealand) Jacob Spoonley	Wellington Phoenix	Unattached
31 March 2008	Dylan Macallister	(Norway) Lyn	Central Coast Mariners
31 March 2008	Troy Hearfield	Newcastle Jets	Wellington Phoenix
31 March 2008	(New Zealand) Steven Old	Wellington Phoenix	(Australia) Macarthur Rams
4 April 2008	Ross Aloisi	Wellington Phoenix	Retired
7 April 2008	Josip Magdić	(Australia) Floreat Athena	Perth Glory
8 April 2008	(New Zealand) Ben Sigmund	(New Zealand) Auckland City	Wellington Phoenix
12 April 2008	(Brazil) Juninho	Sydney FC	Unattached
21 April 2008	Stan Lazaridis	Perth Glory	Unattached
24 April 2008	Robert Bajic	Adelaide United	Unattached
24 April 2008	Milan Susak	Adelaide United	Unattached
24 April 2008	Shaun Ontong	Adelaide United	Newcastle Jets
2 May 2008	Adriano Pellegrino	(Australia) MetroStars	Perth Glory
2 May 2008	(Argentina) Adrian Trinidad	Unattached	Perth Glory
10 May 2008	Mitchell Prentice	Perth Glory	Sydney FC
14 May 2008	Daniel Piorkowski	Melbourne Victory	Unattached
15 May 2008	(Brazil) Alemão	(Brazil) Juventus	Adelaide United
17 May 2008	(Brazil) Cristiano	(Netherlands) Willem II	Adelaide United
21 May 2008	Chris Payne	(Australia) Manly United	Sydney FC
23 May 2008	(Brazil) Ney Fabiano	(Thailand) Chonburi	Melbourne Victory
23 May 2008	(Brazil) Leandro Love	Melbourne Victory	(Japan) Vissel Kobe (end of loan)
28 May 2008	Bruce Djite	Adelaide United	(Turkey) Gençlerbirliği
29 May 2008	Mark Birighitti	(Australia) AIS	Adelaide United
2 June 2008	Damien Brown	Central Coast Mariners	Retired
3 June 2008	Kaz Patafta	Melbourne Victory	Newcastle Jets
6 June 2008	Scott Jamieson	Unattached	Adelaide United
10 June 2008	Nathan Burns	Adelaide United	(Greece) AEK Athens
16 June 2008	David D'Apuzzo	(Australia) APIA Leichhardt	Central Coast Mariners
16 June 2008	(Netherlands) Sergio van Dijk	Unattached	Brisbane Roar
16 June 2008	Ian McAndrew	Central Coast Mariners	Unattached
19 June 2008	Michael Thwaite	(Norway) Brann	Melbourne Victory (loan)
19 June 2008	Matthew Trott	Central Coast Mariners	Unattached
25 June 2008	Adam Kwasnik	Central Coast Mariners	Wellington Phoenix
6 July 2008	(Brazil) Amaral	Unattached	Perth Glory
7 July 2008	Antun Kovacic	(Australia) Richmond	Newcastle Jets
13 July 2008	(England) Joe Keenan	Melbourne Victory	Unattached
14 July 2008	(Costa Rica) José Luis López	(Costa Rica) Deportivo Saprissa	Melbourne Victory (loan)
21 July 2008	(New Zealand) Dave Mulligan	Unattached	Wellington Phoenix
22 July 2008	Robert Younis	(Australia) APIA Leichhardt	Adelaide United
28 July 2008	Pedj Bojic	(Australia) Sutherland Sharks	Central Coast Mariners
28 July 2008	Dez Giraldi	(Australia) Wollongong	Sydney FC
29 July 2008	Paul Reid	Unattached	Adelaide United
31 July 2008	(Denmark) Jesper Håkansson	Unattached	Newcastle Jets
1 August 2008	(Ecuador) Edmundo Zura	(Ecuador) Imbabura	Newcastle Jets (loan)
1 August 2008	(Scotland) Charlie Miller	Unattached	Queensland Roar
7 August 2008	Manny Muscat	(Australia) Green Gully	Wellington Phoenix
11 August 2008	Scott Bulloch	(Australia) Sorrento	Perth Glory
15 August 2008	Shannon Cole	(Australia) Sydney Olympic	Sydney FC

=== Mid-season ===
Date	Name	Moving from	Moving to
19 August 2008	Mark Bosnich	Unattached	Central Coast Mariners
20 August 2008	Matthew Nash	(Australia) APIA Leichhardt	Central Coast Mariners
23 August 2008	Marko Jesic	Unattached	Newcastle Jets
4 September 2008	Wayne Srhoj	Unattached	Perth Glory
12 September 2008	Daniel Piorkowski	Unattached	Newcastle Jets
1 October 2008	Chris Tadrosse	Unattached	Central Coast Mariners
16 October 2008	(Italy) Andrea Merenda	Unattached	Central Coast Mariners
16 October 2008	John Filan	Unattached	Sydney FC
16 October 2008	(Netherlands) Bobby Petta	(Australia) Para Hills Knights	Sydney FC
19 October 2008	Mark Bosnich	Central Coast Mariners	Unattached
24 October 2008	Beau Busch	(Australia) Manly United	Sydney FC
4 November 2008	(Ecuador) Edmundo Zura	Newcastle Jets	(Ecuador) Imbabura (end of loan)
14 November 2008	(Brazil) Fred	(United States) D.C. United	Wellington Phoenix (loan)
19 November 2008	(China) Gao Leilei	Wellington Phoenix	Unattached
10 December 2008	Scott Higgins	Unattached	Wellington Phoenix
18 December 2008	(Netherlands) Victor Sikora	Unattached	Perth Glory
18 December 2008	(Brazil) Fred	Wellington Phoenix	(United States) D.C. United (end of loan)
25 December 2008	Mile Jedinak	Central Coast Mariners	(Turkey) Gençlerbirliği
4 February 2009	Rostyn Griffiths	(England) Blackburn Rovers	Adelaide United
13 February 2009	(Brazil) Henrique	(Brazil) América	Queensland Roar
