= Chris Tadrosse =

Australian soccer player

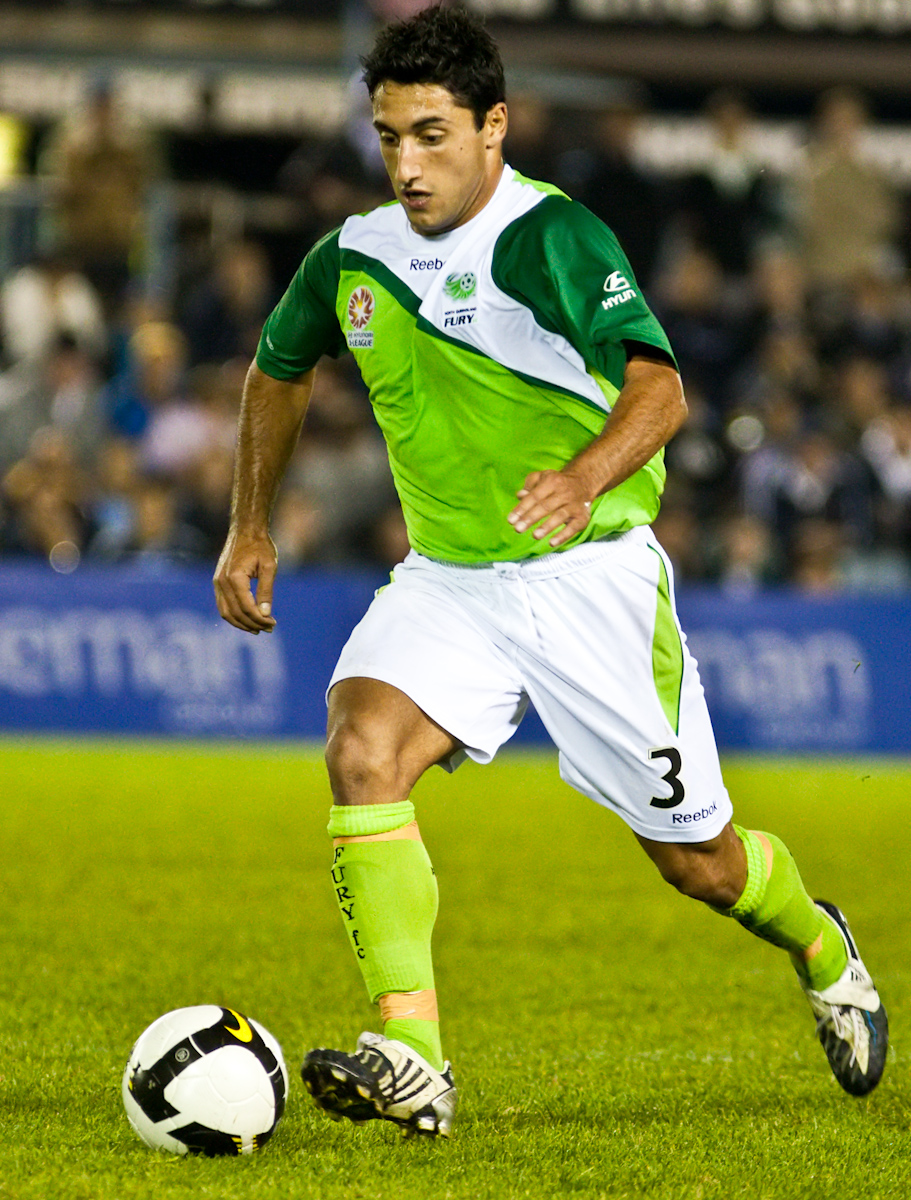
- Tadrosse playing for North Queensland Fury in 2009

Personal information
- Full name: Christopher Tadrosse
- Date of birth: 10 September 1985 (age 41)
- Place of birth: Sydney, Australia
- Height: 1.72 m (5 ft 8 in)
- Position: Left back

Youth career
- 1993–1997: Colo Soccer Football Club
- Bonnyrigg White Eagles
- 2000–2001: Nepean
- 2002–2003: NSWIS
- AIS

Senior career*
| Years | Team | Apps | (Gls) |
| 2004–2005 | Blacktown City Demons | | |
| 2005–2006 | Melbourne Victory | 8 | (0) |
| 2005–2006 | KFC Uerdingen 05 | 16 | (2) |
| 2006–2008 | Borussia Mönchengladbach II | 35 | (0) |
| 2008–2009 | Central Coast Mariners | 1 | (0) |
| 2009–2010 | North Queensland Fury | 23 | (1) |
| 2010–2015 | Bonnyrigg White Eagles | 123 | (6) |

International career
| 2005 | Australia U-20 | | |
- * Club domestic league appearances and goals as of 16 September 2015

Chris Tadrosse (born 10 September 1985) is an Australian former professional footballer. He most recently played at a high level for Bonnyrigg White Eagles.

== Club career ==
He was part of Melbourne Victory's squad in the A-League, but was allowed to leave late in the club's inaugural year; having failed to make a real impact in his limited appearances and Melbourne having to rebuild after an unsuccessful season.

The first stop on his German adventure was with Oberliga Nordrhein league club KFC Uerdingen 05. After a short stay he moved to Bundesliga club Borussia Mönchengladbach. He made several appearances for the club's second team but was released at the end of the 2007–08 season.

On 1 October 2008, Tadrosse signed with the Central Coast Mariners after a trial period of one month as a short-term injury replacement for Dean Heffernan. In 2008, he had a short trial at English League Two side Port Vale.

Tadrosse joined new A-League club North Queensland Fury for their inaugural season in the competition, after signing with the club.
