= Jobe Wheelhouse =

Australian soccer player

Personal information
- Full name: Jobe Wheelhouse
- Date of birth: 14 May 1985 (age 41)
- Place of birth: Newcastle, Australia
- Height: 1.84 m (6 ft 1/2 in)
- Position: Defensive midfielder

Youth career
- 2002: AIS

Senior career*
Years	Team	Apps	(Gls)
2003–2013	Newcastle Jets	106	(7)
2013–2019	Lambton Jaffas	82	(12)
2020	Toronto Awaba Stags	1	(0)

International career^{‡}
2003	Australia U-20	12	(0)
- * Club domestic league appearances and goals as of 2 December 2020 ‡ National team caps and goals as of 17:30, 13 November 2010 (UTC)

Jobe Wheelhouse (born 14 April 1985 in Newcastle, New South Wales, Australia) is an Australian football (soccer) player who plays for Lambton Jaffas.

== Club career ==
Wheelhouse was unavailable for the majority of the 2006-07 A-League season and made his return against Perth Glory in Round 1 of the 2007–08 season.

Since returning, Wheelhouse has impressed for the Jets, one of the standouts in Newcastle's disastrous 2008–09 A-League campaign, where they plummeted from champions to wooden spooners in one season. Jobe scored one of the great A-League goals of all time in a Round 18 clash with Gold Coast United in season 2009–10. The goal was described by Gold Coast manager Miron Bleiberg as a "Maradona-style" goal.

On 23 September 2011 he was appointed captain of the Newcastle Jets for the 2011–12 A-League season. After playing quite an important role in his captaincy, Jobe Wheelhouse was again appointed the captain of the Newcastle United Jets for the 2012/ 2013 Hyundai A-League Season.

On 31 January 2013 it was announced that Wheelhouse had quit the club and was taking the rest of the season off. The reason behind his departure was that his contract was not going to be renewed for the 2013/2014 season. He then moved on to playing for Northern NSW State League side Lambton Jaffas.

In 2020, Wheelhouse made an appearance for the Northern NSW State League Division 1 side Toronto Awaba Stags

== International career ==
=== Youth ===
He represented Australia at the 2003 FIFA World Youth Championship.

== Honours ==
With Newcastle Jets:

- Australia A-League Championship: 2007–2008
