= Adrian Trinidad =

Argentine footballer

Personal information
- Full name: Adrian Dario Trinidad
- Date of birth: 18 October 1982 (age 44)
- Place of birth: Buenos Aires, Argentina
- Height: 1.80 m (5 ft 11 in)
- Position: Forward

Senior career*
Years	Team	Apps	(Gls)
2000–2004	Flandria	75	(6)
2004–2005	Persipura Jayapura	12	(2)
2005–2006	Persema Malang	22	(11)
2006–2007	Persiba Balikpapan	24	(12)
2007–2008	KL Plus	18	(10)
2008–2009	Perth Glory	15	(3)
2009–2010	Persiba Balikpapan	18	(8)
2010–2012	Persik Kediri	14	(7)
2012–2018	CA Colegiales		
Total		198	(59)
- * Club domestic league appearances and goals

Adrian Trinidad (born 18 October 1982) is an Argentine former footballer who played as a forward.

== Biography ==
=== Perth Glory ===
Trinidad played his first game for Perth Glory against the Newcastle Jets in which he scored his first goal for the club. Trinidad came under some criticism from opposition coaches after he was involved in the dismissal of Sydney FC's Iain Fyfe and for his alleged dive to win a penalty against Newcastle Jets (although replays showed that Trinidad was fouled). Trinidad was involved in an after match confrontation with Jets coach Gary van Egmond after the match which led to the FFA to investigate and ban van Egmond for two games.
