= Brodie Mooy =

Australian soccer player

Personal information
- Full name: Brodie Mooy
- Date of birth: 19 June 1990 (age 36)
- Place of birth: Ermington, New South Wales, Australia
- Height: 1.80 m (5 ft 11 in)
- Position: Midfielder

Youth career
- Blacktown City Demons
- NSWIS
- Manly United
- Marconi Stallions
- 2008–2009: Newcastle Jets

Senior career*
Years	Team	Apps	(Gls)
2009–2011	Newcastle Jets	12	(0)
2011–2012	Parramatta FC	1	(0)
2013	West Ryde Rovers		

International career
- Australia U-17
- * Club domestic league appearances and goals as of 16:47, 13 November 2010 (UTC)

Brodie Mooy (born 19 June 1990) is an Australian footballer who last played for West Ryde Rovers.

== Club career ==
Brodie is a graduate of the NSW Institute of Sport. On 9 January 2008 he made his senior debut for the Jets against Adelaide United mostly due to a large contingent of players unavailable for selection due to injury.

Mooy joined Newcastle jets after playing for Marconi Stallions in the NSW Premier League under 20 competition in which he received the Golden Boot Award in 2008. He played for Newcastle Jets and was named Jets Youth player of the year and subsequently was given a two-year professional contract.

In 2010 Mooy had played a total of 6 A-league games 6 Asian Champions League and a friendly game against LA Galaxy which included David Beckham.

15 April 2011 saw Mooy join NSW Premier League outfit Parramatta Eagles FC after his spell with Hyundai A-League club Newcastle Jets. In 2011 Mooy travelled abroad to England to trial with League 1 club Crewe Alexandra, he subsequently fractured his knee against Wigan and a bone tumour was discovered in his knee during recovery. Mooy has since recovered from surgery to remove a benign tumor and retired to concentrate on studying for a law degree entering university and studying full-time.

== International career ==
Mooy represented Australia under 17's against Laos in an Under 17 World cup Qualifier in Laos in 2006.

== Personal life ==
Former Celtic and Socceroos player Aaron Mooy is his cousin.
