= Jesse Pinto =

Footballer (born 1990)

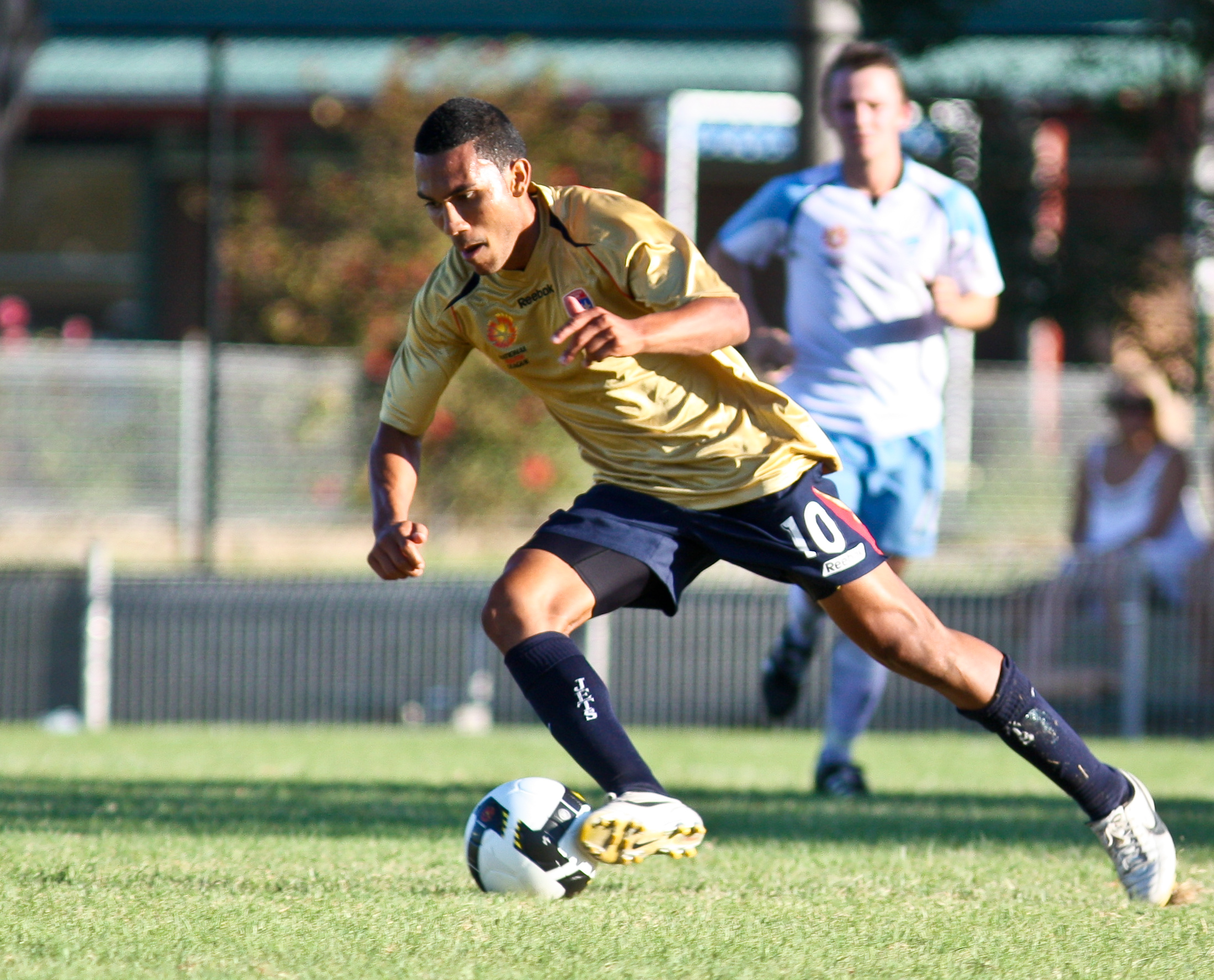

Personal information
- Full name: Jesse Fernando Pinto
- Date of birth: 1 May 1990 (age 36)
- Place of birth: Darwin, Australia
- Height: 1.74 m (5 ft 9 in)
- Position: Attacking midfielder

Youth career
- Blacktown City Demons
- 2008–2011: Newcastle Jets

Senior career*
Years	Team	Apps	(Gls)
2008–2009	Blacktown City Demons	11	(0)
2009–2011	Newcastle Jets	3	(0)
2010–2011	→ West Sydney Berries (loan)	10	(1)
2011–2012	Dili United	14	(3)
2012–2013	Yadanarbon	18	(2)
2013–2014	Mitra Kukar	12	(0)
2014–2015	North Sunshine Eagles	8	(1)
2015–2025	Hellenic Athletic	88	(19)

International career^{‡}
2006	Australia U17	2	(0)
2011	Timor-Leste U23	4	(0)
2012	Timor-Leste	3	(1)
- * Club domestic league appearances and goals as of 6 September 2025 ‡ National team caps and goals as of 26 July 2017

Jesse Pinto (born 1 May 1990) is a footballer who last played for the Australian club Hellenic Athletic. Born in Australia, he represented Timor-Leste at international level.

== Biography ==
Pinto grew up in western Sydney, attending Hebersham Primary School and Hills Sports High School. On 9 January 2009, he made his senior debut for the Jets against Adelaide United. He was used as a substitute in the 66th minute but was controversially taken off in the 82nd minute.

== International career ==
In 2008, Pinto represented Australia at U-19 Schoolboy level in international friendlies in the United Kingdom.

Pinto began his international career as a Timor-Leste U-23 in preparing for the Southeast Asian Games in November 2011. He made his debut in a national team U-23 match against Indonesia U-23 on 25 October 2011, which ended in defeat 0–5.

He made his debut for the Timor-Leste on 7 October 2012 in a match against Myanmar.
