= Kaz Patafta =

Australian soccer player

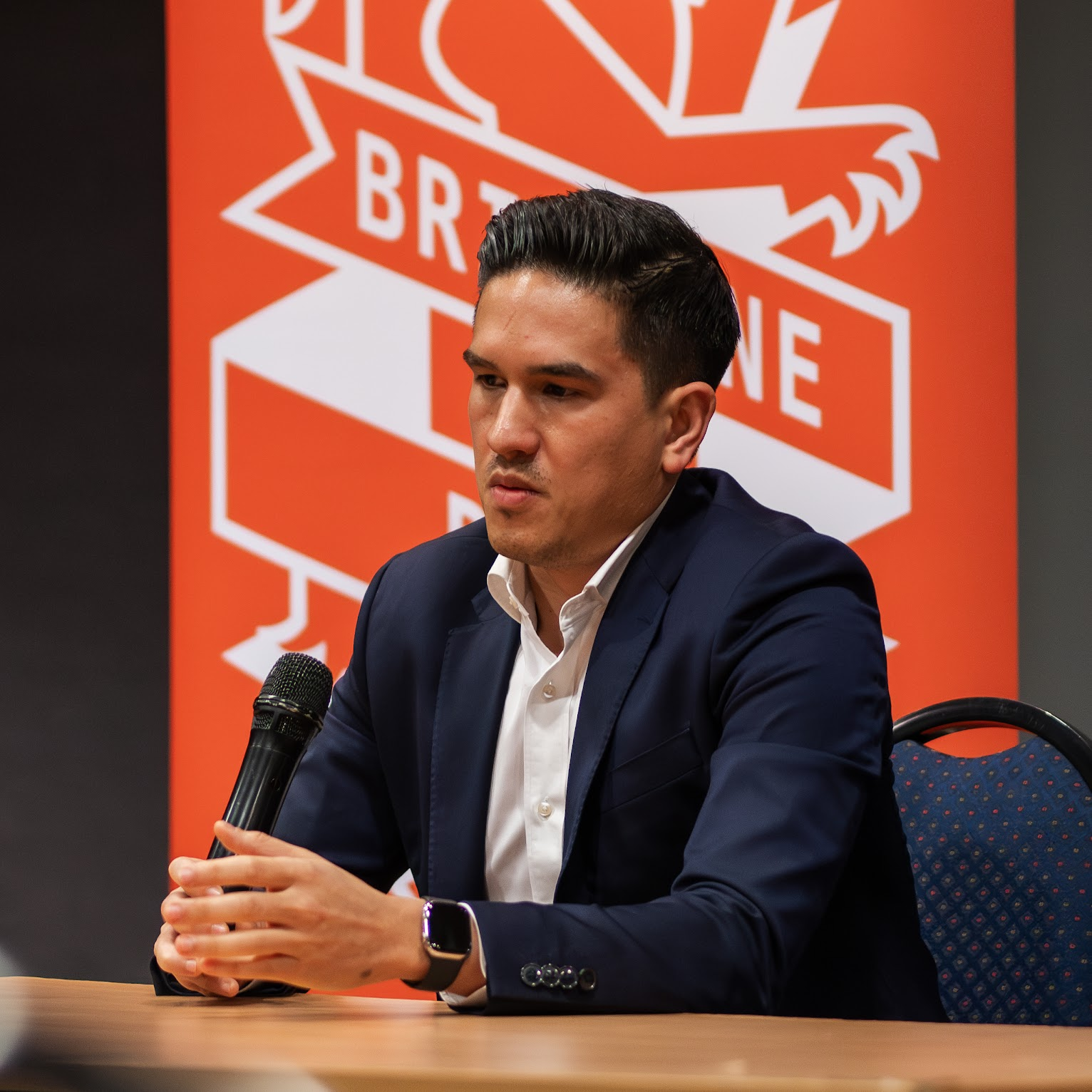

Personal information
- Full name: Kaz Phonesak Patafta
- Date of birth: 25 October 1988 (age 38)
- Place of birth: Canberra, Australia
- Height: 1.74 m (5 ft 8 1/2 in)
- Position: Attacking midfielder

Youth career
- 2004: ACTAS
- 2004–2005: AIS
- 2006–2007: Benfica

Senior career*
Years	Team	Apps	(Gls)
2006–2008	Benfica	0	(0)
2007–2008	→ Melbourne Victory (loan)	14	(1)
2008–2012	Newcastle Jets	33	(1)
2013–2014	Canberra FC	6	(4)
2014	Sydney United	8	(0)
2015	Khonkaen United	8	(0)
2015–2016	Lanexang United		
2023	Canberra Croatia	11	(8)

International career
2004–2005	Australia U-17	18	(2)
2005–2006	Australia U-20	5	(0)
- * Club domestic league appearances and goals

Kaz Phonesak Patafta (born 25 October 1988) is an Australian sports administrator and former professional footballer. He has been the chairman and chief executive officer (CEO) of Brisbane Roar FC since July 2023. Prior to this, he worked as a lawyer specialising in corporate law. He also founded his own legal firm, McDonald Patafta & Associates Lawyers, with offices in Singapore, Laos and Belgium.

Patafta previously played as a midfielder for Benfica, Melbourne Victory, Newcastle Jets and Khon Kaen United F.C. He captained the Australia under-17 national team at the 2005 FIFA U-17 World Championship in Peru and also the Australia under-20 national team at the 2006 AFC Youth Championship. Former Australian national team coach, Ange Postecoglou, stated Patafta as "the most technically gifted player I've coached."

== Early life and education ==
Kaz Patafta was born in Canberra, ACT to parents of Croatian and Laotian descent. Growing up, Patafta played football at northside-based junior football clubs Belsouth FC and Belnorth FC. He was a student at Radford College.

Patafta attended Deakin University in 2011 to undertake a Bachelor of Laws, which he completed in 2014. He subsequently completed his Graduate Diploma in Legal Practice at the Australian National University.

== Club career ==
Patafta attended the ACTAS in 2004 and then graduated to the Australian Institute of Sport. Whilst at the AIS, Patafta was frequently called up to the Australian U-17 national team by Ange Postecoglou and in 2005 was called up to the Australian U-20 national team. After graduating from the AIS Patafta had been ignored by Australia's A-League clubs before the Netherlands' PSV Eindhoven, whose interest was due to the recommendation of then Australia national football team manager Guus Hiddink, and Benfica expressed interest in signing him.

=== Benfica ===
==== 2006–07 season ====
Patafta joined Benfica B squad as a 16-year-old having impressed at international youth level, however, initially his transfer was blocked by Football Federation Australia as he was under the age of 18. After receiving a clearance he eventually joined the squad in January 2006. Patafta featured in a pre-season friendly for the club's first-team against CF Estrela da Amadora on 15 August 2006. Patafta was part of the Benfica youth team during the 2006-07 U-19 Championship season where he scored 2 goals in 13 league games. His first goal for the youth-team came in a 2–1 home victory against Pescadores on 25 November 2006, where he was substituted onto the field for João Ferreira in the 52nd minute and scored Benfica's second goal in the 88th minute with an open shot after receiving the ball from a cross. Patafta scored his second goal for the youth-team in the 5th minute of a 3–1 away victory against Caparica on 31 March 2007.

==== Loan to Melbourne Victory ====
Patafta joined Australian A-League champions Melbourne Victory on loan for the 2007–08 season. He played his first game for Melbourne Victory in a pre-season match against Sydney FC. On 11 January 2008, Patafta scored his first A-League goal with a left-foot shot from a tight angle in the 88th minute of a 3–0 home victory against Wellington Phoenix.

=== Newcastle United Jets ===
In May 2008, Patafta secured a release from the remainder of his contract with Benfica with the assistance of the Australian Professional Footballers' Association. On 2 June 2008, Patafta signed a 1-year contract with the Newcastle Jets. On 22 August 2008 he debuted for Newcastle in a 3–3 with Perth Glory when he was substituted on in the 80th minute for Edmundo Zura.

=== Canberra FC ===
Patafta returned to playing football in a guest appearance, playing for Canberra FC in a friendly game versus Malaysia national football team (3:2). He later played five matches for Canberra FC, he scored four goals including a hat trick against Cooma.

=== Lanexang Intra FC ===
Patafta joined Lao Premier League side Lane Xang Intra F.C. for the 2015/2016 seasons.

In March 2016, Patafta announced that he was retiring from the game at the age of 28 to become the general manager of Lanexang. Patafta said that he had earned his law degree from Deakin University in 2014 and felt that he felt he could make a large impact on the business side of football. He remained in that role until the dissolution of the team in January 2017.

== International career ==
=== Australia U–17 national team ===
In 2004, Patafta was included in the Australia U-17 national team squad for a tour of the United States in December 2004 but due to injury he was not considered by Ange Postecoglou for the squad the 20-man squad for a five-match tour of Chile against Palestino U–17, Universidad Catolica U–17, Colo-Colo U–17 and Chile U–17. Australia were crowned champions of the 2005 OFC U-17 Championship and qualified for the 2005 FIFA U-17 World Championship in Peru. Patfta was selected for a Four-Nations tournament in Peru against Costa Rica U–17, Ecuador U–17 and Peru U–17 in July 2005 as preparation for the U-17 World Championship. Patafta set up a goal in Australia's 2–2 draw with Peru when his free kick was played in from near the corner and headed in by Jamie Cumming. Patafta was named team captain of the 19-man squad by Ange Postecoglou for the U-17 World Championship in September, wearing the number #10 shirt, he played in all three group-stage matches of the competition and was part of the team's starting–11. Australia finished in third place of their respective group, after losing to Turkey (1–0) and to Mexico (3–0) and winning against Uruguay (2–1).

=== Australia U–20 national team ===
In 2006, the Australia U-20 national team participated in a five-match South American tour in against Colo-Colo U–20, Universidad de Chile U–20, Chile U–20 and Argentina U–20. The South American tour was preparation for the 2006 AFC Youth Championship in October–November, the qualification campaign for the eventual 2007 FIFA U-20 World Cup, however, Benfica did not release Patafta for the tour. Patafta was selected to play at the 2006 AFC Youth Championship held in India. Australia finished in second spot of their respective group after losing to China (1–0) and defeating Thailand (3–1) and the United Arab Emirates (2–0). Australia advanced to the quarter–finals where they were defeated 2–1 against South Korea and failed to qualify for the 2007 FIFA U-20 World Cup.

=== Australia ===
Patafta was included as part of Australia's "train-on" squad before the 2006 FIFA World Cup, along with fellow promising young Australian players Kristian Sarkies and Neil Kilkenny. Unlike these players, he was not given a senior cap in the team's three pre-World Cup friendly matches.

=== Laos ===
In 2015, Patafta announced his intention to play for the Laos national team (the nation of his mother's birth) after moving to the Lao Premier League. However, he was not called up to the side due to a government policy preventing players with multiple citizenship from representing the national team.

== Honours ==
Australia

- OFC U-17 Championship: 2005

== Football Academy ==
In early 2013 Patafta and Shaun Ontong set up a football academy in Canberra, Ontong Patafta Bernal Football Academy. Andy Bernal later joined the pair as a partner in the football academy. The academy offers youth players in Canberra a professional training environment and pathways to elite level football.

In October 2013, the Ontong Patafta Bernal Football Academy was nominated as a finalist and won the 2013 Canberra Business Point Award in the Micro-Enterprise Business category.
