= Gary van Egmond =

Australian soccer player and coach

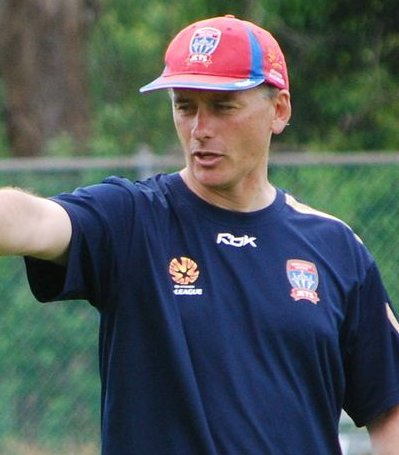
- Van Egmond coaching the Newcastle Jets at training in 2008

Personal information
- Full name: Gary Rudy Peter van Egmond
- Date of birth: 29 June 1965 (age 61)
- Place of birth: Sydney, Australia
- Position: Defender

Youth career
- Manly-Warringah Dolphins

Senior career*
Years	Team	Apps	(Gls)
1982–1986	APIA Leichhardt	7	(0)
1985	→ Blacktown City Demons (loan)	2	(0)
1987–1989	Footscray JUST	61	(1)
1989–1990	Marconi Stallions	25	(1)
1990–1991	Roda JC	10	(0)
1991–1997	Marconi Stallions	109	(8)
1996–1997	Wollongong City Wolves	21	(0)
1997–1998	Bonnyrigg White Eagles	17	(0)
1998	Blacktown City	8	(0)
2001	Manly-Warringah Dolphins	3	(0)
Total		264	(10)

International career
1988–1989	Australia	9	(0)

Managerial career
- 1999–2001: Manly-Warringah Dolphins
- 2006–2009: Newcastle Jets
- 2011–2014: Newcastle Jets
- 2019–2021: Australia U20
- 2023–2024: Newcastle Jets Women
- 2024: China Women U17
- 2025–2026: Hills United
- 2026: Western Sydney Wanderers
- * Club domestic league appearances and goals

Gary Rudy Peter van Egmond (/ˈɛɡmɒnd/, Dutch: [vɑn eɣmɔnt]; born 29 June 1965) is an Australian former soccer player and former head coach of Newcastle Jets in the A-League Men and Women. He recently was the head coach of Western Sydney Wanderers in the A-League Men.

== Playing career ==
Van Egmond began his playing career with APIA Leichhardt in 1982. It was not until he joined Footscray JUST in 1987 that he established himself as a prominent player in the National Soccer League (NSL) before moving overseas to play for Roda JC where he only managed to get 10 games.

He made his Australia national soccer team debut in the 1988 Seoul Olympics under Frank Arok and went on to have success with Marconi Stallions in the 1990s – where he won an NSL championship and played in three finals.

== Managerial career ==
Van Egmond began his coaching career with success as youth coach of Northern Spirit FC before he won the state-league grand final on his return to Manly-Warringah as head coach in 1999. He then joined Newcastle Breakers as the Assistant Coach in 2001. After Round 7 of season 2006–07, the Jets were last and winless, so existing coach Nick Theodorakopoulos was replaced by van Egmond.

Van Egmond turned the Jets season around, making him very popular within the Newcastle community. With a 0–3–4 record for the first 7 games, van Egmond helped the Jets to an 8–3–3 record for the final 14, securing the Jets a place in the A-League finals and cementing his job at the club for the 2007–08 season.

In the 2007–08 season van Egmond guided the Newcastle Jets to second place on the league table and then to the A-League Championship. Van Egmond was signed to coach the Newcastle Jets until the end of the 2012–13 season. However at the end of the 2008–09 season he left the club and accepted a position at the Australian Institute of Sport.

The Football Federation Australia (FFA) charged van Egmond with bringing the game into disrepute for a furious on-field outburst with Perth Glory player, Adrian Trinidad, in round 11. He was banned from the touch-line for four games and fined $2000, but the FFA suspended half the ban and the fine until the end of the season. On 20 October 2011, he signed a two-year contract with former club Newcastle Jets who play in the A-League.

On 5 September 2012 it was announced he had signed a one-year contract extension keeping him at the club until 2013–14 season. On 20 January 2014 his contract to manage Newcastle Jets was terminated by mutual consent

From 2015 to 2021 he spent time as a coach, or assistant coach in the Australian national team setup, being involved with the Matilda's, the Australian women's national team, and with the Men's youth teams. In December 2021 he joined the Western Sydney Wanderers as an assistant coach, taking over the role that Kenny Miller had vacated earlier in the season.

== Personal life ==
Van Egmond is married to Annette, and has three children: Laura, Max and Emily, the latter of whom is a professional soccer player. Van Egmond is of Dutch heritage.

== Career statistics ==
=== International ===
Appearances and goals by national team and year
National team	Year	Apps	Goals
Australia	1988	7	0
Australia	1989	2	0
Total		9	0

== Honours ==
=== Player ===
With Marconi Stallions:

- NSL Championship: 1992–1993

With Bonnyrigg White Eagles:

- NSW Premier League Runners Up: 1997

=== Manager ===
With Newcastle Jets:

- A-League Championship: 2007–2008

Personal honours:

- A-League Coach of the Year: 2007–2008

Awards
Preceded by Ernie Merrick	A-League Coach of the Year; 2007–08	Succeeded by Aurelio Vidmar
