= Jason Naidovski =

Australian soccer player

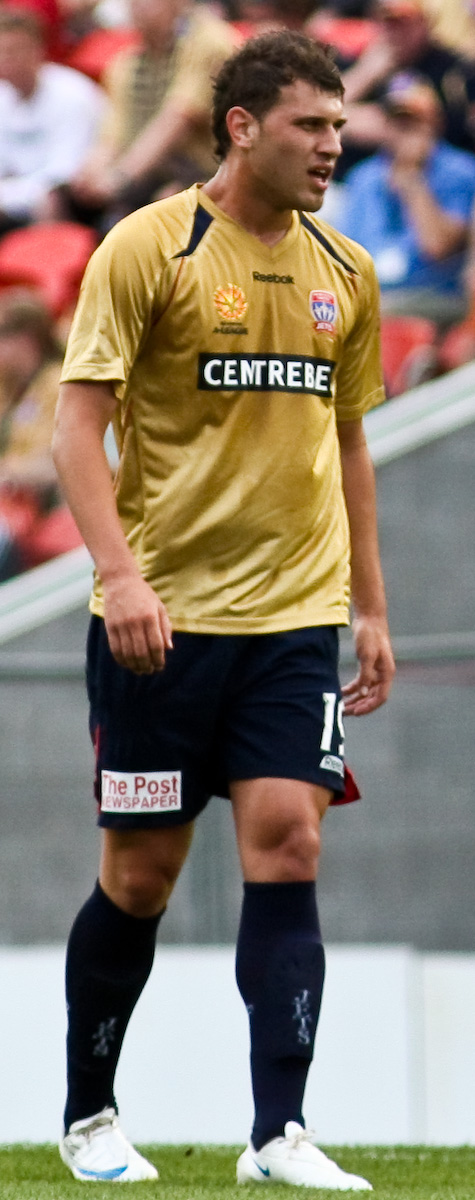

Personal information
- Full name: Jason Victor Naidovski
- Date of birth: 19 July 1989 (age 37)
- Place of birth: Sydney, Australia
- Height: 1.88 m (6 ft 2 in)
- Position: Striker

Youth career
- 2003: Bankstown City Lions
- 2004–2005: Marconi Stallions
- 2006–2007: NSWIS
- 2007–2008: AIS

Senior career*
Years	Team	Apps	(Gls)
2006	Marconi Stallions		
2007–2008	AIS	16	(12)
2008–2010	Newcastle Jets FC	8	(1)
2010	Marconi Stallions	8	(3)
2011–2012	Rockdale City Suns	27	(5)
2013	Mounties Wanderers	3	(0)
2014	St George	5	(0)
2014–2016	Bankstown City	11	(4)
2016	Spirit FC	1	(0)

International career^{‡}
- Australia U-17
2007–2009	Australia U-20	8	(2)
2007	Australia U-23	1	(0)
- * Club domestic league appearances and goals as of 20 June 2021 ‡ National team caps and goals as of 18 December 2007

Jason Naidovski (born 19 July 1989) is an Australian footballer.

== Biography ==
Jason previously played for the Australian Institute of Sport in the Victorian Premier League. He scored a hat-trick against the Fawkner Blues in his final game for the AIS.

Naidovski made his mark on the A-League scene scoring a late winner against Wellington Phoenix in Round 1 of the 2009–10 A-League season. Fellow Jets' striker Sean Rooney crossed the ball into Naidovski who neatly headed the ball into the bottom corner of the net. In September 2014 Jason announced his retirement at 25. Reason of his early retirement was because of on-going knee issues. He requires a fourth knee reconstruction in 5 years.

== Honours ==
With Australia:

- AFF U19 Youth Championship: 2008
