= Jarrad Ross =

Australian soccer player

Personal information
- Full name: Jarrad Mychael Ross
- Date of birth: 4 May 1990 (age 36)
- Place of birth: Newcastle, Australia
- Position: Defender

Youth career
- 2008–2010: Newcastle Jets
- 2009–2012: Charlestown City

Senior career*
Years	Team	Apps	(Gls)
2008	Lake Macquarie City		
2008–2009	Newcastle Jets	3	(0)
2012–2017	Charlestown City	59	(3)
- * Club domestic league appearances and goals as of 30 September 2018

Jarrad Ross is an Australian professional soccer player who plays for Charlestown City Blues FC.

== Career ==
On 9 January 2008, Ross made his senior debut for the Jets against Adelaide United.
