= Donny de Groot =

Dutch footballer

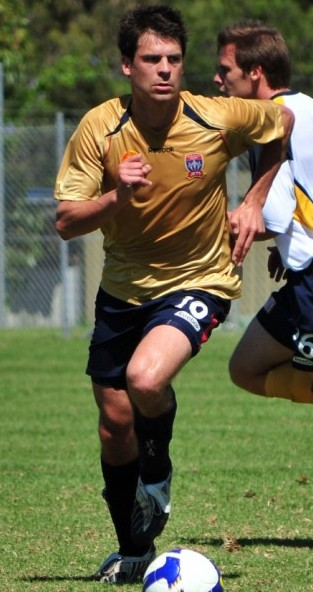

Personal information
- Full name: Donny de Groot
- Date of birth: 16 August 1979 (age 47)
- Place of birth: Gouda, Netherlands
- Height: 1.85 m (6 ft 1 in)
- Position: Forward

Youth career
- UNIO
- FC Utrecht

Senior career*
Years	Team	Apps	(Gls)
1999–2004	FC Utrecht	28	(5)
2002	→ Volendam (loan)	15	(9)
2002–2003	→ Emmen (loan)	31	(30)
2004–2005	RBC	23	(7)
2005–2006	De Graafschap	25	(13)
2006–2007	AEK Larnaca	23	(9)
2007–2009	De Graafschap	36	(8)
2009–2010	Newcastle United Jets	4	(0)
2010	Go Ahead Eagles	10	(3)
2010–2011	RKC	34	(20)
2011–2012	Willem II	32	(14)
2012–2013	Sint-Truiden	16	(5)
2013–2014	Eindhoven	28	(12)
2014–2015	Fortuna Sittard	20	(0)
Total		325	(136)
- * Club domestic league appearances and goals

Donny de Groot (born 16 August 1979) is a Dutch retired footballer who played as a striker.

== Club career ==
=== Early career ===
De Groot started his football career with amateur side UNIO in Oudewater, near his native town Gouda. As a youth player, he moved to FC Utrecht, where he made his debut for the main squad on 27 February 2000, in the home game against AZ. During the next two and a half years in Utrecht, De Groot played only five matches for the main squad. During the 2001–02 season, De Groot moved to FC Volendam, where he scored 9 goals in 15 matches. De Groot moved to FC Emmen for the next season. His 30 goals in 31 matches made him top scorer of the 2002–03 Eerste Divisie.

=== Success and career abroad ===
He returned to FC Utrecht for the 2003–04 Eredivisie season; he played 23 matches, scoring 5 goals. At the end of the season, De Groot moved to RBC Roosendaal, and during the 2005–06 Eredivisie season, he went to Eerste Divisie side De Graafschap. At the end of the season, De Groot moved abroad, signing a two-year deal with AEK Larnaca of Cyprus. De Groot played for the Cypriot side for only one season, and returned to De Graafschap for the 2007–08 Eredivisie season.

On 30 January 2009, he went to Newcastle Jets on a free transfer. On 10 March 2009, he made his debut for Newcastle in their 2–0 loss in the AFC Champions League to Beijing Guoan. De Groot fell out of favour under new manager Branko Čulina and was given permission to negotiate with other clubs.

=== Return home ===
Therefore, he went to back to his home country where he signed with Go Ahead Eagles on a free transfer in January 2010. He immediately made an impact, scoring two goals as a jet lagged second-half substitute in a Dutch Cup quarter finals away win over Eredivisie side NAC Breda. He had only finished his long journey from Australia less than 24 hours earlier. In June 2011 it was reported that he would sign a contract at Tilburgian side Willem II Tilburg. He later had a spell with Belgian side Sint-Truiden and signed with Fortuna Sittard in 2014.

== Post-playing career ==
While living in Diessen at the time, De Groot took up his first senior coaching job at local amateur side Beerse Boys in 2017. He had already worked as an assistant and youth coach at PSV, RKC and Fortuna Sittard. He later moved to Cyprus.

== Honours ==
=== Club ===
FC Utrecht

- KNVB Cup: 2003–04

RKC Waalwijk:

- Eerste Divisie: 2010–11

=== Individual ===
- Eerste Divisie Player of the Year: 2002–03
- Eerste Divisie Top scorer: 2002–03
