= Antun Kovacic =

Australian soccer player

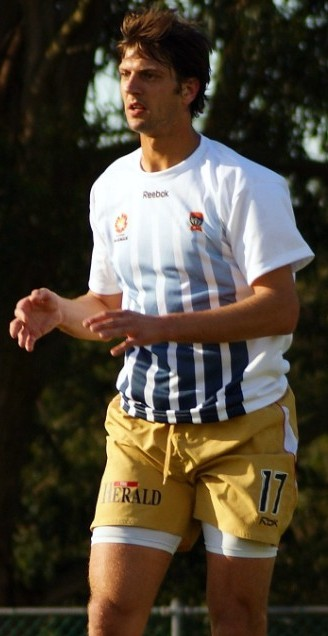

Personal information
- Full name: Antun Matthew Kovacic
- Date of birth: 10 July 1981 (age 45)
- Place of birth: Melbourne, Australia
- Height: 1.94 m (6 ft 4 1/2 in)
- Position: Central defender

Youth career
- Chelsea Hajduk

Senior career*
Years	Team	Apps	(Gls)
1999–2000	Preston Lions	38	(2)
2000–2002	Melbourne Knights	11	(0)
2002	Heidelberg United	11	(1)
2002–2004	Melbourne Knights	31	(0)
2005–2006	Oakleigh Cannons	40	(5)
2006–2007	Melbourne Victory	2	(0)
2007	Oakleigh Cannons	22	(2)
2008	Richmond SC	14	(1)
2008	Newcastle Jets	7	(1)
2009	Ulsan Hyundai Horang-i	3	(0)
2010–2011	Richmond SC	41	(4)
2011–2012	Churchill Brothers	9	(1)
2012	Richmond SC	8	(0)
2013	Dandenong City	19	(1)
2014	Melbourne Knights	21	(0)
Total		277	(18)
- * Club domestic league appearances and goals as of 21 September 2014

Antun Kovacic (born 10 July 1981) is a former Australian footballer.

== Club career ==
Melbourne Victory recruited Kovacic from Oakleigh Cannons as a short-term replacement for the injured Daniel Piorkowski towards the end of the 06/07 season, featuring in two games. He also played for several years in the now defunct National Soccer League with the Melbourne Knights.

In June 2008 Kovacic began trialling with the Newcastle Jets and impressed in two pre-season games, including one against the Central Coast Mariners. In early July Kovacic signed with the Newcastle Jets on a two-year deal to bolster their defence.

In March 2009, Kovacic moved to Ulsan Hyundai Horang-i to take up the club's '3+1' ACL roster spot.

He returned to Australia for one season, helping Richmond Eagles to the Victorian Premier League Premiership and Grand Final in 2010. In 2011, he moved to Indian I-League side Churchill Brothers.

In February 2014, Kovačić returned to the Melbourne Knights. With the Knights, he won the Dockerty Cup, helping the club to their first piece of silverware in 18 years. At the end of the season, Kovacic retired from competitive football.
