= Daniel Piorkowski =

Australian soccer player

Personal information
- Full name: Daniel Piorkowski
- Date of birth: 12 January 1984 (age 42)
- Place of birth: Melbourne, Australia
- Height: 1.87 m (6 ft 1 1/2 in)
- Positions: Centre back; right back

Senior career*
Years	Team	Apps	(Gls)
2001–2005	Melbourne Knights FC	26	(0)
2005–2008	Melbourne Victory FC	30	(0)
2008	Newcastle Jets FC	7	(0)
2009–2011	Gold Coast United FC	2	(0)

International career^{‡}
2002–2003	Australia U-20	2	(0)
Medal record
Representing Australia
Men's Association football
OFC U-20 Championship
Winner	2002 Fiji/Vanuatu
- * Club domestic league appearances and goals as of 1 October 2011 ‡ National team caps and goals as of 17:30, 1 November 2010 (UTC)

Daniel Piorkowski (born 12 January 1984) is an Australian footballer.

== Club career ==
=== Melbourne Knights ===
Piorkowski's progress as a footballer was delayed by a knee reconstruction, sustained during his playing days with ex NSL club Melbourne Knights FC. Daniel also was a member of the Australian Under 20 Side and missed out on a place in the Under-20 World Cup due to a knee reconstruction.

=== Melbourne Victory ===
After signing for Melbourne Victory, Piorkowski made 11 appearances and was signed to a new two-year deal in April 2006. Piorkowski was an important part of the Victory defence during their premiership winning season in 06/07 along with Adrian Leijer and Rodrigo Vargas. He injured his knee during the season and did not feature in the finals series. On 13 February 2008 he was tabled a new contract by Victory but remained undecided whether to stay with the club. On 13 May 2008 he finally decided to pursue his ambitions of playing in Europe.

=== Newcastle Jets ===
On 13 September 2008, Piorkowski signed a short deal after a week-long trial to cover injured defender Shaun Ontong.

=== Gold Coast United ===
On 20 November 2008, Piorkowski joined Gold Coast United FC on a two-year deal.

== Honours ==
Melbourne Victory

- A-League Championship: 2006-2007
- A-League Premiership: 2006-2007

Australia U-20

- OFC U-19 Men's Championship: 2002
