= Shaun Ontong =

Australian soccer player and coach

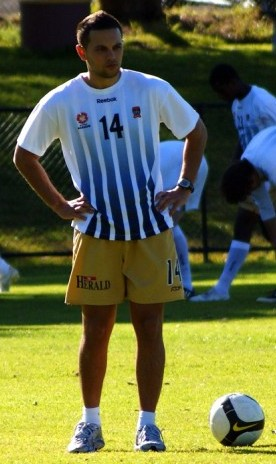

Personal information
- Full name: Shaun Paul Ontong
- Date of birth: 25 March 1987 (age 39)
- Place of birth: Canberra, Australia
- Height: 1.75 m (5 ft 9 in)
- Position: Right back

Team information
- Current team: Yokohama F. Marinos (assistant)

Youth career
- Belwest
- 2001: Belconnen United
- 2002: ACTAS
- 2003–2006: AIS

Senior career*
Years	Team	Apps	(Gls)
2007–2008	Adelaide United	9	(0)
2008–2010	Newcastle Jets	4	(0)
2011	Oakleigh Cannons	14	(0)

International career^{‡}
2006	Australia U-20	13	(0)

Managerial career
- 2014–2015: Dempo S.C. (assistant)
- 2018–2019: Northeast United (assistant)
- 2019–2020: Kerala Blasters (assistant)
- 2020–: Yokohama F. Marinos (assistant)
- * Club domestic league appearances and goals as of 18 December 2007 ‡ National team caps and goals as of 18 December 2007

Shaun Ontong (born 25 March 1987 in Canberra, Australia) is a retired Australian footballer and coach who is current assistant coach of Yokohama F. Marinos.

His father, Paul Ontong, was born in South Africa and played in the NSL for Canberra City, Mooroolbark SC and Brisbane Lions.

== Club career ==
Ontong grew up in Canberra, playing junior football for local clubs Belwest Foxes and later Belconnen United. In 2006, he was awarded a place in the AIS football program. In late 2006, he trialled with German club 1. FC Nürnberg, but suffered a groin injury during the trial and returned to Australia. He spent time briefly with Melbourne Victory before heading back to Europe, trialling with FC Sion and later in Slovenia with NK Maribor and Bela Krajina, but his recurrent injury forced another return home. In June 2007, he signed with Adelaide United on a one-year contract, followed by a two-year contract with the Newcastle Jets in April 2008. As of 2012, he was playing with Oakleigh Cannons in the Victorian Premier League.

== International career ==
Ontong received 10 caps at international U20 level and captained the Young Socceroos through the AFC Youth Championship 2006 campaign.

== A-League career statistics ==
(As of January 2008)

Club	Season	League			Finals			Asia			Total		
Club	Season	Apps	Goals	Assists	Apps	Goals	Assists	Apps	Goals	Assists	Apps	Goals	Assists
Adelaide United	2007–08	9	0	0	-	-	-	-	-	-	9	0	0
Total											9	0	0

== Football academy ==
In 2013 Ontong and fellow Canberran Kaz Patafta set up a football academy in Canberra, Ontong Patafta Football Academy.
