= FFA Centre of Excellence =

- Full name: FFA Centre of Excellence
- Founded: 1981
- Dissolved: 2017
- Ground: Australian Institute of Sport
- League: National Youth League; National Premier Leagues
- 2017: 2nd
Home colours	Away colours

The FFA Centre of Excellence (formerly the Australian Institute of Sport Football Program) was a soccer talent identification and player development program run by Football Federation Australia (FFA) and was based at the Australian Institute of Sport, in Canberra. The Centre of Excellence ran this program for men. The program was one of the eight founding sports of the AIS in 1981. The FFA announced that the centre would close at the end of 2017.

== History ==
The AIS soccer program was funded by the Australian Federal Government, through the Australian Sports Commission. In 2005–2006 this funding amounted to A$1,115,000. The format involved 20 students per year selected for an initial period of 12 months training and study, with the additional option of a second year. The men's program was residential, while the women's was training camp-based. Students were generally 15–17 years old when selected and required to have current, or pending, Australian citizenship.

The original stated aim of the men's program was

"To identify and develop players for the national under-20 youth team and to develop coaches through the Scholarship Coaching scheme".

== Head coaches ==
- Jimmy Shoulder (1981–1986)
- Ron Smith (1986–1996)
- Steve O'Connor (1996–2008)
- Jan Versleijen (2008–2011)
- Tony Vidmar (2012–2017)

== National representation ==
Following the decision of several soccer graduates to represent other countries at a senior national level (e.g. Josip Simunic), the AIS implemented contracts whereby the cost of the scholarship would later have to be repaid by any graduate who went on to play soccer at a senior level representing a country – other than Australia – in international competition.

=== World Cup ===
AIS soccer has developed many players to represent Socceroos at the FIFA World Cup.

==== 2006 Germany ====
John Aloisi (1992), Marco Bresciano (1997), Brett Emerton (1995–1996), Joshua Kennedy (1998–1999), Mark Milligan (2002), Craig Moore (1992–1993), Lucas Neill (1994–1995), Josip Skoko (1992–1993), Mile Sterjovski (1996–1996), Mark Viduka (1992–1993) and Luke Wilkshire (1998), Josip Šimunić (1994–1996) for Croatia

==== 2010 South Africa ====
Lucas Neill (captain) (1994–1995), Craig Moore (1992–1993), Brett Emerton (1995–1996), Luke Wilkshire (1998), Joshua Kennedy (1998–1999), Adam Federici (2002), Vince Grella (1996–1997), Carl Valeri (2000–2001), Nikita Rukavytsya (2005–2006), Mark Milligan (2002), Dario Vidosic (2005–2006), Marco Bresciano (1997), Josip Šimunić (1994–1996) for Croatia

==== 2014 Brazil ====
Marco Bresciano (1997), James Holland (2006–2007), Mitchell Langerak (2005–2006), Matt McKay (2000–2001), Mark Milligan (2002), Matthew Spiranovic (2006), Dario Vidosic (2005–2006)

== Competition participation ==
=== National Soccer League ===
The AIS fielded teams in the former National Soccer League's youth competition. Within that competition it was placed in the Northern Division. The AIS won three titles, in 1986, 1998 and 1999.

=== Victorian Premier League ===
The men's program had previously entered a team in the New South Wales Premier League competition in 2005. In 2007 the AIS entered a team into the Victorian Premier League. This would allow regular, weekly competitive matches that were lacking for previous scholarship holders. As part of their inclusion as the only non-Victorian team in the VPL competition, all 'home' fixtures were played in Victoria for the 2007 season. The side struggled for consistency throughout the season, finishing 12th on the ladder, however great benefit was reportedly gained from the participation in a men's competition. In 2008 the men's program team continued to participate in the Victorian Premier League, improving from the previous year as the AIS finished 8th on the ladder. AIS home games were also played in Canberra, while some high-profile matches which includes the Round 21 match between the AIS and the Preston Lions FC was played in Country Victoria at Rumbalara Oval, Shepparton. This was designed to promote the competition and bring the top state league competition to new areas.

However the men's program team will cease to compete in the Victorian Premier League competition for 2009, as the AIS program will be designed to accommodate younger players, hence eliminating the need to compete in a senior men's competition.

=== National Youth League ===
On 3 July 2009, it was announced the AIS would compete in the National Youth League.

In August 2017, the Centre of Excellence was closed by the FFA.

== Notable alumni ==
List of players with 10 caps or more for their country. Names in bold for players who represented their Country at a FIFA World Cup.

Name	Club	Position	Years	Current status	Country	International caps
Frank Farina		FW	1982–83	Coaching	(Australia)	67
Warren Spink		FW	1983–84	Coaching	(Australia)	38
Robbie Hooker		DF	1984–85	Retired	(Australia)	22
Jason Polak		MF	1985–87	Retired	(Australia)	32
Paul Trimboli	(Australia) Melbourne Victory	FW	1986	Administration	(Australia)	46
Jason van Blerk	(Australia) Central Coast Mariners Academy	MF	1986	Coaching	(Australia)	33
Craig Foster		MF	1986–87	Media	(Australia)	29
Steve Horvat		DF	1987–88	Retired	(Australia)	32
Shaun Murphy		DF	1988	Retired	(Australia)	18
Ned Zelic		DF	1988	Media	(Australia)	34
George Sorras		FW	1989–90	Retired	(Australia)	27
Alistair Edwards	(Malaysia) Johor Darul Ta'zim	FW	1988	Coaching	(Australia)	19
Steve Corica	(New Zealand) Auckland FC	MF	1989–90	Coaching	(Australia)	32
Kevin Muscat	(China) Shanghai Port F.C.	DF	1990–91	Coaching	(Australia)	46
**Craig Moore**	(Australia) Coomera Colts	DF	1992–93	Coaching	(Australia)	52
Hayden Foxe	(Australia) Perth Glory	DF	1993–94	Coaching	(Australia)	11
**Josip Skoko**		MF	1992–93	Retired	(Australia)	51
**John Aloisi**	(Australia) Western United	FW	1992–93	Coaching	(Australia)	55
**Mark Viduka**		FW	1992–93	Retired	(Australia)	43
**Lucas Neill**		DF	1994–95	Retired	(Australia)	96
**Josip Šimunić**	Croatia U-19	DF	1995–96	Coaching	(Croatia)	105
**Brett Emerton**		MF	1996	Retired	(Australia)	95
**Vince Grella**		MF	1996	Agent	(Australia)	46
Simon Colosimo		DF	1996–97	Retired	(Australia)	26
**Anthony Šerić**		MF	1996–97	Retired	(Croatia)	16
**Mile Sterjovski**	(Australia) Macarthur FC	MF	1996–98	Coaching	(Australia)	43
**Mark Bresciano**		MF	1997	Retired	(Australia)	84
**Ivan Ergić**		MF	1997–98	Retired	(Serbia)	11
**Luke Wilkshire**		MF	1997–98	Coaching	(Australia)	80
**Joshua Kennedy**		FW	1998–99	Media	(Australia)	36
Jade North		DF	1999	Retired	(Australia)	41
Alex Brosque		FW	2001	Retired	(Australia)	21
**Matt McKay**		MF	2001	Retired	(Australia)	59
**Carl Valeri**		MF	2001–02	Retired	(Australia)	52
**Adam Federici**		GK	2002	Retired	(Australia)	16
**Mark Milligan**	(Australia) Newcastle Jets	MF	2002	Coaching	(Australia)	80
**Robbie Kruse**		FW	2005–06	Retired	(Australia)	75
**Nikita Rukavytsya**	Free agent	FW	2005–06	Playing	(Australia)	21
**Dario Vidošić**		MF	2006	Coaching	(Australia)	23
**Matthew Spiranovic**		DF	2006	Coaching	(Australia)	36
James Holland		MF	2006–07	Retired	(Australia)	17
Nathan Burns		FW	2006	Retired	(Australia)	24
Rhyan Grant	(Australia) Sydney FC	DF	2008	Playing	(Australia)	21
**Trent Sainsbury**	(Australia) Central Coast Mariners	DF	2009–10	Playing	(Australia)	61
**Adam Taggart**	(Australia) Perth Glory FC	FW	2009–10	Playing	(Australia)	16
**Milos Degenek**	(Serbia) FK TSC	DF	2012	Playing	(Australia)	44
