= 2008–09 Central Coast Mariners FC season =

Central Coast Mariners
2008–09 season
- Executive Chairman: Lyall Gorman
- Manager: Lawrie McKinna
- Stadium: Bluetongue Stadium
- A-League: 4th
- A-League finals: 4th
- A-League Pre-Season Challenge Cup: Group stage
- AFC Champions League: Group stage
- Top goalscorer: League: Matt Simon (11); All: Matt Simon (13)
- Highest home attendance: 15,546 vs Perth Glory (31 December 2008, A-League)
- Lowest home attendance: 5,843 vs Tianjin Teda (19 May 2009, AFC Champions League)
- Average home league attendance: 10,465

The 2008–09 season was Central Coast Mariners Football Club's 4th season since the inception of the A-League.

Central Coast's A-League season commenced on 15 August 2008. After losing in the Grand Final in the previous season, they again made the finals series after finishing fourth, only to be eliminated by Queensland Roar.

The Mariners also competed in the Pre-Season Cup, where they were eliminated in the group stage.

In Asia, the Mariners lost in the Champions League group stage, drawing two games and losing four.

== Players ==
=== First team squad ===
| Squad No. | Name | Nationality | Position(s) | Since | Date of birth (age) | Signed from | Games played | Goals scored |
Goalkeepers
| 1 | Matthew Nash | (Australia) | GK | 2008 | 3 April 1981 (age 45) | (Australia) APIA Leichhardt Tigers | 0 | 0 |
| 20 | Danny Vuković | (Australia) | GK | 2005 | 27 March 1985 (age 41) | (Australia) Bonnyrigg White Eagles | 26 | 0 |
| 30 | Andrew Redmayne | (Australia) | GK | 2007 | 13 January 1989 (age 37) | (Australia) Australian Institute of Sport | 2 | 0 |
Defenders
| 4 | Pedj Bojić | (Australia) | RB, LB | 2008 | 9 April 1984 (age 42) | (Australia) Sutherland Sharks | 27 | 0 |
| 5 | Brad Porter | (Australia) | RB, CM | 2006 | 19 February 1987 (age 39) | (Australia) Australian Institute of Sport | 53 | 1 |
| 6 | David D'Apuzzo | (Australia) | LB | 2008 | 5 September 1988 (age 38) | (Australia) APIA Leichhardt Tigers | 10 | 0 |
| 8 | Dean Heffernan | (Australia) | LB | 2005 | 19 May 1980 (age 46) | (Australia) Sutherland Sharks | 60 | 9 |
| 13 | Paul O'Grady | (Australia) | CB | 2005 | 6 November 1978 (age 48) | (Australia) Marconi Stallions | 41 | 3 |
| 15 | Andrew Clark | (Australia) | RB | 2005 | 24 August 1974 (age 52) | (Australia) APIA Leichhardt Tigers | 83 | 0 |
| 16 | Nigel Boogaard | (Australia) | CB | 2005 | 14 August 1986 (age 40) | (Australia) Central Coast Lightning | 41 | 1 |
| 17 | Matthew Osman | (Australia) | RB, RM | 2005 | 29 July 1983 (age 43) | (Australia) Penrith United | 77 | 4 |
| 18 | Alex Wilkinson | (Australia) | CB, RB | 2005 | 30 August 1984 (age 42) | (Australia) Manly United | 109 | 1 |
| 25 | Nathan Sherlock | (Australia) | CB | 2009 | 2 February 1990 (age 36) | Central Coast Mariners youth | 0 | 0 |
Midfielders
| 2 | André Gumprecht | (Germany) | RM, CM | 2005 | 26 November 1974 (age 51) | Singapore Armed Forces FC | 83 | 5 |
| 3 | Shane Huke | (Australia) | DM, CM, RB | 2009 | 2 October 1985 (age 41) | (England) Rushden & Diamonds | 5 | 0 |
| 7 | John Hutchinson | (Malta) | LM, CM, DM | 2005 | 29 December 1979 (age 46) | (Australia) Manly United | 95 | 12 |
| 10 | Adrian Caceres | (Australia) | LW, AM | 2008 | 10 January 1982 (age 44) | (Australia) Melbourne Victory | 29 | 3 |
| 12 | Greg Owens | (Australia) | AM, RW | 2007 | 27 January 1981 (age 45) | (Australia) Adelaide United | 17 | 2 |
| 21 | Ahmad Elrich | (Australia) | RW | 2008 | 30 May 1981 (age 45) | (New Zealand) Wellington Phoenix | 9 | 1 |
| 22 | Nick Rizzo | (Australia) | LW | 2009 | 9 June 1979 (age 47) | (Australia) Perth Glory | 1 | 0 |
| 28 | Matthew Lewis | (Australia) | LW | 2009 | 6 June 1990 (age 36) | Central Coast Mariners youth | 1 | 0 |
Strikers
| 9 | Nik Mrdja | (Australia) | FW | 2005 | 30 November 1978 (age 47) | (Sweden) AIK | 44 | 11 |
| 11 | Dylan Macallister | (Australia) | FW | 2008 | 17 May 1982 (age 44) | (Norway) Lyn | 26 | 5 |
| 19 | Matt Simon | (Australia) | FW | 2006 | 21 July 1986 (age 40) | (Australia) Central Coast Lightning | 49 | 14 |
| 23 | Adam Kwasnik | (Australia) | FW, RW, LW | 2009 | 31 May 1983 (age 43) | (New Zealand) Wellington Phoenix | 79 | 21 |
| 25 | Brady Smith | (Australia) | FW | 2009 | 10 August 1989 (age 37) | Central Coast Mariners youth | 1 | 0 |

=== 2008–09 A-League squad ===
Note: Flags indicate national team as defined under FIFA eligibility rules; some limited exceptions apply. Players may hold more than one non-FIFA nationality.

| No. | Pos. | Nation | Player |
|---|---|---|---|
| 1 | GK | AUS | Matthew Nash |
| 2 | MF | GER | André Gumprecht |
| 4 | DF | AUS | Predrag Bojić |
| 5 | MF | AUS | Brad Porter |
| 6 | DF | AUS | David D'Apuzzo |
| 7 | MF | MLT | John Hutchinson |
| 8 | DF | AUS | Dean Heffernan |
| 9 | FW | AUS | Nik Mrdja |
| 10 | MF | AUS | Adrian Caceres |
| 11 | FW | AUS | Dylan Macallister |
| 12 | MF | AUS | Greg Owens |
| 13 | DF | AUS | Paul O'Grady |
| 15 | DF | AUS | Andrew Clark |
| 16 | DF | AUS | Nigel Boogaard |

| No. | Pos. | Nation | Player |
|---|---|---|---|
| 17 | MF | AUS | Matthew Osman |
| 18 | DF | AUS | Alex Wilkinson (Captain) |
| 19 | FW | AUS | Matt Simon |
| 20 | GK | AUS | Danny Vukovic |
| 21 | MF | AUS | Ahmad Elrich |
| 22 | FW | AUS | Sasho Petrovski |
| 23 | MF | AUS | Mile Jedinak |
| 23 | FW | AUS | Adam Kwasnik |
| 24 | MF | ITA | Andrea Merenda (Injury replacement) |
| 26 | MF | AUS | Chris Tadrosse (Injury replacement) |
| 28 | MF | AUS | Matthew Lewis |
| 30 | GK | AUS | Andrew Redmayne |
| 40 | GK | AUS | Mark Bosnich (Guest player) |

=== 2009 AFC Champions League squad ===
Note: Flags indicate national team as defined under FIFA eligibility rules; some limited exceptions apply. Players may hold more than one non-FIFA nationality.

| No. | Pos. | Nation | Player |
|---|---|---|---|
| 1 | GK | AUS | Matthew Nash |
| 2 | MF | GER | André Gumprecht |
| 3 | MF | AUS | Shane Huke |
| 4 | DF | AUS | Predrag Bojić |
| 5 | MF | AUS | Brad Porter |
| 6 | DF | AUS | David D'Apuzzo |
| 7 | MF | MLT | John Hutchinson |
| 8 | DF | AUS | Dean Heffernan |
| 9 | FW | AUS | Nik Mrdja |
| 10 | MF | AUS | Adrian Caceres |
| 11 | FW | AUS | Dylan Macallister |
| 12 | MF | AUS | Greg Owens |
| 13 | DF | AUS | Paul O'Grady |

| No. | Pos. | Nation | Player |
|---|---|---|---|
| 15 | DF | AUS | Andrew Clark |
| 16 | DF | AUS | Nigel Boogaard |
| 17 | MF | AUS | Matthew Osman |
| 18 | DF | AUS | Alex Wilkinson (captain) |
| 19 | FW | AUS | Matt Simon |
| 20 | GK | AUS | Danny Vukovic |
| 21 | MF | AUS | Ahmad Elrich |
| 22 | MF | AUS | Nick Rizzo |
| 23 | FW | AUS | Adam Kwasnik |
| 25 | DF | AUS | Nathan Sherlock |
| 26 | FW | AUS | Brady Smith |
| 27 | MF | AUS | Matthew Lewis |
| 30 | GK | AUS | Andrew Redmayne |

=== Youth squad ===
Note: Flags indicate national team as defined under FIFA eligibility rules; some limited exceptions apply. Players may hold more than one non-FIFA nationality.

| No. | Pos. | Nation | Player |
|---|---|---|---|
| — | GK | AUS | Matt Nemes |
| — | DF | AUS | Nick Kapsis |
| — | DF | AUS | Nathan Sherlock (Captain) |
| — | DF | AUS | Steven Tibbetts |
| — | DF | AUS | Scott Wright |
| — | MF | AUS | Ashley Balcomb |
| — | MF | AUS | Laurence Braude |
| — | MF | AUS | Matthew Lewis |

| No. | Pos. | Nation | Player |
|---|---|---|---|
| — | MF | AUS | Tim McGowan |
| — | MF | AUS | Sean Mitchell |
| — | MF | AUS | Glen Trifiro |
| — | FW | AUS | Ty Owens |
| — | FW | AUS | Brady Smith |
| — | FW | AUS | Daniel Taylor |
| — | FW | AUS | Darko Vidovic |

=== Transfers ===
==== In ====
| Date | Pos. | Name | From | Fee |
|---|---|---|---|---|
| 7 February 2008 | MF | (Australia) Adrian Caceres | (Australia) Melbourne Victory | Free |
| 9 March 2008 | MF | (Australia) Ahmad Elrich | (New Zealand) Wellington Phoenix | Free |
| 28 March 2008 | FW | (Australia) Dylan Macallister | (Norway) Lyn | Free |
| 16 July 2008 | DF | (Australia) David D'Apuzzo | (Australia) APIA Leichhardt Tigers | Undisclosed |
| 28 July 2008 | DF | (Australia) Pedj Bojić | (Australia) Sutherland Sharks | Undisclosed |
| 19 August 2008 | GK | (Australia) Mark Bosnich | Unattached | Free |
| 20 August 2008 | GK | (Australia) Matthew Nash | (Australia) APIA Leichhardt Tigers | Undisclosed |
| 1 October 2008 | DF | (Australia) Chris Tadrosse | Unattached | Free |
| 20 October 2008 | MF | (Italy) Andrea Merenda | Unattached | Free |
| 2 February 2009 | MF | (Australia) Shane Huke | (England) Rushden & Diamonds | Free |
| 9 February 2009 | FW | (Australia) Adam Kwasnik | (New Zealand) Wellington Phoenix | Free |
| 10 February 2009 | MF | (Australia) Nick Rizzo | (Australia) Perth Glory | Free |

==== Out ====
| Date | Pos. | Name | To | Fee |
|---|---|---|---|---|
| 19 January 2008 | DF | (Australia) Alvin Ceccoli | (Australia) Adelaide United | Free |
| 24 February 2008 | DF | (Australia) Tony Vidmar | Retired | |
| 27 February 2008 | MF | (Australia) Tom Pondeljak | (Australia) Melbourne Victory | Free |
| 4 March 2008 | FW | (Australia) John Aloisi | (Australia) Sydney FC | Free |
| 2 June 2008 | DF | (Australia) Damien Brown | Retired | |
| 16 June 2008 | MF | (Australia) Ian McAndrew | Released | Free |
| 25 June 2008 | FW | (Australia) Adam Kwasnik | (New Zealand) Wellington Phoenix | Free |
| 18 July 2008 | GK | (Australia) Matthew Trott | Released | Free |
| 19 October 2008 | GK | (Australia) Mark Bosnich | Released | Free |
| 25 December 2008 | MF | (Australia) Mile Jedinak | (Turkey) Gençlerbirliği | $821,500 |
| 4 February 2009 | FW | (Australia) Sasho Petrovski | (Australia) Newcastle Jets | Free |

== Club ==
=== Coaching staff ===
| Position | Staff |
|---|---|
| Manager | (Australia) Lawrie McKinna |
| Assistant coach Youth team coach Development manager | (Australia) Alex Tobin |
| Goalkeeping coach | (Australia) John Crawley |
| Strength and conditioning coach | (Australia) Andrew Clark |
| Academy manager | (Australia) Tony Walmsley |

=== Other information ===
| Executive chairman | (Australia) Lyall Gorman |
| Ground (capacity and dimensions) | Central Coast Stadium (20,059 / 105x68 metres) |

== Kit ==
Supplier: Reebok

| Home | Home alt. | Away | Away alt. | Goalkeeper 1 | Goalkeeper 2 |

== Pre-season and friendlies ==
| 20 May 2008 Central Coast Challenge Cup | Central Coast Lightning | 1–1 | Central Coast Mariners | Gosford |
| 19:00 AEST | | Report | | Stadium: Pluim Park; Attendance: 2,000; Referee: Kris Griffiths-Jones |

| 28 May 2008 | Spirit FC | 2–5 | Central Coast Mariners | Sydney |
| 19:30 AEST | Cunningham 50' (pen.); Orgad 70' | | Macallister 10', 81'; Brown 15'; Brad Porter 20'; Petrovski 80' | Stadium: Christie Park |

| 6 June 2008 | Capricorn Cougars | 0–3 | Central Coast Mariners | Rockhampton |
| 19:30 AEST | | Report | Simon 36', 78', 90+1' (pen.) | Stadium: Jardine Park; Referee: Chris Beath |

| 8 June 2008 | Whitsunday Miners | 0–5 | Central Coast Mariners | Mackay |
| 18:00 AEST | | | Petrovski 27'; Hutchinson 49'; Macallister 60', 76', 83' | Stadium: Harrup Park |

| 21 June 2008 | Central Coast Mariners | 0–1 | Newcastle Jets | Budgewoi |
| 14:45 AEST | | Report | Song Jin-hyung 31' | Stadium: Frank Millington Field; Referee: Stuart Wolfe |

| 25 June 2008 | Belconnen United | 1–2 | Central Coast Mariners | Canberra |
| 19:00 AEST | Wells 33' | Report | Beaton 68', 90' | Stadium: Belconnen Soccer Centre; Attendance: 850; Referee: Gary Vanderburgt |

| 27 June 2008 | ACT Rockets | 0–4 | Central Coast Mariners | Canberra |
| 19:00 AEST | | Report | Bojić 14'; Lagana 38'; Petrovski 45'; Osman 71' | Stadium: Deakin Football Centre |

| 1 July 2008 | Northern Tigers | 0–3 | Central Coast Mariners | Sydney |
| 19:30 AEST | | | Jedinak 5'; Petrovski 40'; Smith 69' | Stadium: Mills Park; Attendance: 1,000 |

| 12 July 2008 | Central Coast Mariners | 3–0 | Newcastle Jets | Canberra |
| 13:00 AEST | Jedinak 4', 61'; Petrovski 5' | Report | | Stadium: Canberra Stadium; Attendance: 4,873; Referee: Ben Williams |

| 15 July 2008 | Central Coast Mariners | 1–2 | New Zealand U-23 | Sydney |
| 15:00 AEST | Macallister 73' | Report | 20' (o.g.); Ellensohn 40' | Stadium: Knox Grammar School; Attendance: 750; Referee: Matthew Gillett |

| 22 February 2009 | Central Coast Mariners | 2–1 | Sunshine Coast | Budgewoi |
| 10:00 AEDT | Osman 30'; Mrdja 80' | | 85' | Stadium: Frank Millington Field |

| 24 February 2009 | Central Coast Mariners | 1–0 | Newcastle Jets | Budgewoi |
| 11:00 AEDT | Petrovski 64' | | | Stadium: Frank Millington Field |

| 28 February 2009 | Jiangsu Sainty (China) | 2–1 | Central Coast Mariners | Kunshan, China |
| 14:30 CST | 70'; 90+2' | Report | Osman 40' | Stadium: Kunshan Sports Centre |

| 3 March 2009 | Shandong Luneng (China) | 2–0 | Central Coast Mariners | Jinan, China |
| 15:00 CST | Li Jinyu 12'; Lü Zheng 90' | Report | | Stadium: Shandong Provincial Stadium |

| 28 April 2009 Central Coast Challenge Cup | Central Coast Lightning | 0–4 | Central Coast Mariners | Gosford |
| 19:00 (AEDT | | | Kwasnik (pen.); Boogaard; Caceres; Elrich | Stadium: Pluim Park |

== Competitions ==
=== Overall ===
| Competition | Started round | Final position / round | First match | Last match |
|---|---|---|---|---|
| Pre-Season Challenge Cup | Group stage | Group stage | 20 July 2008 | 3 August 2008 |
| A-League | — | 4th | 15 August 2008 | 25 January 2008 |
| A-League finals | Minor semi-final | Minor semi-final | 6 February 2009 | 13 February 2009 |
| AFC Champions League | Group stage | Group stage | 11 March 2009 | 19 May 2009 |

=== Pre-Season Challenge Cup ===
==== Group stage ====
| Team | Pld | W | D | L | GF | GA | GD | Pts | Qualification |
|---|---|---|---|---|---|---|---|---|---|
| Wellington Phoenix | 3 | 2 | 1 | 0 | 5 | 3 | +2 | 7 | Advances to final |
| Central Coast Mariners | 3 | 2 | 0 | 1 | 5 | 2 | +3 | 6 | |
| Sydney FC | 3 | 1 | 0 | 2 | 4 | 7 | −3 | 3 | |
| Queensland Roar | 3 | 0 | 1 | 2 | 3 | 5 | −2 | 1 | |

| 20 July 2008 1 | Wellington Phoenix | 1–0 | Central Coast Mariners | Wellington |
| 16:00 NZST | Daniel 72'; Hearfield (yellow card) 75'; Dodd (yellow card) 83' | Report | Clark (yellow card) 22'; Macallister (yellow card) 59' | Stadium: Westpac Stadium; Attendance: 4,853; Referee: Michael Hester |

| 27 July 2008 2 | Central Coast Mariners | 3–0 | Sydney FC | Gosford |
| 15:00 AEST | D'Apuzzo (yellow card) 32'; Clark (yellow card) 35'; Porter 41' (yellow card) 70'; Petrovski (yellow card) 56' (goal) 61'; Mrdja 68' (pen.) | Report | Corica (yellow card) 49'; Brosque (yellow card) 63'; Fyfe (yellow card) 68'; Colosimo (yellow card) 74'; Payne (yellow card) 78'; Giraldi (yellow card) 86' | Stadium: Bluetongue Stadium; Attendance: 7,107; Referee: Chris Beath |

| 3 August 2008 3 | Queensland Roar | 1–2 | Central Coast Mariners | Brisbane |
| 15:00 AEST | van Dijk (yellow card) 19'; Moore (red card) 48'; Zullo 50'; Dodd (yellow card) 70' | Report | Hutchinson (yellow card) 19'; Elrich 28'; Macallister 32'; Boogaard (yellow card) 60' | Stadium: Perry Park; Attendance: 3,241; Referee: Peter Green |

=== A-League ===
==== League table ====
| Pos | Team | Pld | W | D | L | GF | GA | GD | Pts | Qualification |
|---|---|---|---|---|---|---|---|---|---|---|
| 1 | Melbourne Victory (C) | 21 | 12 | 2 | 7 | 39 | 27 | +12 | 38 | Qualification for 2010 AFC Champions League group stage and Finals series |
| 2 | Adelaide United | 21 | 11 | 5 | 5 | 31 | 19 | +12 | 38 | Qualification for 2010 AFC Champions League group stage and Finals series |
| 3 | Queensland Roar | 21 | 10 | 6 | 5 | 36 | 25 | +11 | 36 | Qualification for Finals series |
| 4 | Central Coast Mariners | 21 | 7 | 7 | 7 | 35 | 32 | +3 | 28 | Qualification for Finals series |
| 5 | Sydney FC | 21 | 7 | 5 | 9 | 33 | 32 | +1 | 26 | |
| 6 | Wellington Phoenix | 21 | 7 | 5 | 9 | 23 | 31 | −8 | 26 | |
| 7 | Perth Glory | 21 | 6 | 4 | 11 | 31 | 44 | −13 | 22 | |
| 8 | Newcastle Jets | 21 | 4 | 6 | 11 | 21 | 39 | −18 | 18 | |

Source: ultimatealeague.com
Rules for classification: 1) points; 2) goal difference; 3) number of goals scored.
(C) Champions

==== Results summary ====
| Overall | | | | | | | | Home | | | | | | Away | | | | | |
| Pld | W | D | L | GF | GA | GD | Pts | W | D | L | GF | GA | GD | W | D | L | GF | GA | GD |
|---|---|---|---|---|---|---|---|---|---|---|---|---|---|---|---|---|---|---|---|
| 21 | 7 | 7 | 7 | 35 | 32 | +3 | 28 | 5 | 2 | 4 | 19 | 14 | +5 | 2 | 5 | 3 | 16 | 18 | −2 |

==== Results by matchday ====
| Matchday | 1 | 2 | 3 | 4 | 5 | 6 | 7 | 8 | 9 | 10 | 11 | 12 | 13 | 14 | 15 | 16 | 17 | 18 | 19 | 20 | 21 |
|---|---|---|---|---|---|---|---|---|---|---|---|---|---|---|---|---|---|---|---|---|---|
| Ground | A | H | A | A | H | H | A | H | H | A | H | A | A | H | H | A | A | H | H | A | H |
| Result | D | L | W | D | D | W | D | L | W | D | W | L | D | D | W | L | W | W | L | L | L |
| Position | 2 | 6 | 4 | 4 | 4 | 4 | 4 | 4 | 4 | 5 | 2 | 4 | 4 | 5 | 4 | 4 | 4 | 3 | 4 | 4 | 4 |

A = Away; H = Home; W = Win; D = Draw; L = Loss

==== Matches ====
| 15 August 2008 1 | Newcastle Jets | 1–1 | Central Coast Mariners | Newcastle |
| 20:00 EAST | J. Griffiths 90+1' (pen.) | Report | Simon 87' | Stadium: EnergyAustralia Stadium; Attendance: 16,022; Referee: Matthew Breeze |

| 23 August 2008 2 | Central Coast Mariners | 2–3 | Sydney FC | Gosford |
| 19:00 AEST | Petrovski 13' (pen.), 67' (yellow card) 55'; Clark (yellow card) 48'; Bojić (yellow card) 56'; Boogaard (yellow card) 80' | Report | Corica 6', 14'; Middleby (yellow card) 30'; Colosimo (yellow card) 45'; Musialik (yellow card) 68' (yellow-red card) 68'; Cole 81' (yellow card) 90+1'; Fyfe (yellow card) 90+3' | Stadium: Bluetongue Stadium; Attendance: 10,932; Referee: Ben Williams |

| 31 August 2008 3 | Queensland Roar | 2–4 | Central Coast Mariners | Brisbane |
| 17:00 AEST | Reddy (yellow card) 15'; Tiatto (yellow card) 28'; Miller 69' van Dijk 73' (pen.) | Report | Simon (yellow card) 15' (goal) 31'; Jedinak (yellow card) 18' (goal) 48'; Macallister 64', 71' (yellow card) 78'; Clark (yellow card) 76' | Stadium: Suncorp Stadium; Attendance: 12,185; Referee: Peter O'Leary |

| 14 September 2008 4 | Wellington Phoenix | 0–0 | Central Coast Mariners | Wellington |
| 17:00 NZST | Hutchinson (yellow card) 51'; Bojić (yellow card) 54' | Report | Johnson (yellow card) 6'; Dodd (yellow card) 18'; Hearfield (yellow card) 45' | Stadium: Westpac Stadium; Attendance: 6,928; Referee: Strebre Delovski |

| 20 September 2008 5 | Central Coast Mariners | 2–2 | Melbourne Victory | Gosford |
| 19:00 AEST | Simon 11', 82' | Report | Thompson 15', 90+4'; Theoklitos (red card) 53'; Kemp (yellow card) 71' | Stadium: Bluetongue Stadium; Attendance: 9,010; Referee: Peter Green |

| 26 September 2008 6 | Central Coast Mariners | 4–1 | Perth Glory | Gosford |
| 20:00 AEST | Petrovski 9' (yellow card) 58'; Simon (yellow card) 20'; Jedinak 29' (yellow card) 39'; Caceres 45'; Osman 64'; Bojić (yellow card) 79' | Report | Tarka (yellow card) 38'; Rukavytsya 63'; Trinidad (yellow card) 90+2' | Stadium: Bluetongue Stadium; Attendance: 8,016; Referee: Mark Shield |

| 3 October 2008 7 | Adelaide United | 3–3 | Central Coast Mariners | Adelaide |
| 19:30 ACST | Dodd 7' (pen.); Cornthwaite 19' (yellow card) 85'; Cristiano (yellow card) 32' (goal) 50'; Costanzo (yellow card) 66'; Jamieson (yellow card) 74'; Ognenovski (yellow card) 79' | Report | Clark (yellow card) 9'; Jedinak 66' (pen.), 76'; Simon 84'; Bojić (yellow card) 88' | Stadium: Hindmarsh Stadium; Attendance: 9,074; Referee: Ben Williams |

| 19 October 2008 8 | Central Coast Mariners | 0–1 | Wellington Phoenix | Gosford |
| 15:00 AEDT | Jedinak (yellow card) 18'; Simon (yellow card) 61' | Report | Dodd 53'; McKain (yellow card) 62'; Gao Leilei (yellow card) 83' | Stadium: Bluetongue Stadium; Attendance: 9,011; Referee: Ben Williams |

| 24 October 2008 9 | Central Coast Mariners | 1–0 | Newcastle Jets | Gosford |
| 20:00 AEDT | Macallister 33'; Wilkinson (yellow card) 56'; O'Grady (yellow card) 86' | Report | Håkansson (yellow card) 38'; North (yellow card) 63' | Stadium: Bluetongue Stadium; Attendance: 10,710; Referee: Matthew Breeze |

| 1 November 2008 10 | Sydney FC | 3–3 | Central Coast Mariners | Sydney |
| 19:00 AEDT | Bridge 28'; Casey 39'; McFlynn 57' | Report | Jedinak (yellow card) 18'; Petrovski (yellow card) 34'; Simon 63', 81'; Mrdja 78'; Hutchinson (yellow card) 90+4' | Stadium: Sydney Football Stadium; Attendance: 18,251; Referee: Strebre Delovski |

| 15 November 2008 11 | Central Coast Mariners | 3–0 | Adelaide United | Gosford |
| 19:30 AEDT | Simon 18'; Petrovski 44'; Caceres 50'; Wilkinson (yellow card) 90+2' | Report | Barbiero (yellow card) 65'; Spagnuolo (yellow card) 72' | Stadium: Bluetongue Stadium; Attendance: 7,865; Referee: Matthew Breeze |

| 21 November 2008 12 | Melbourne Victory | 2–1 | Central Coast Mariners | Melbourne |
| 20:00 AEDT | Pondeljak 37'; Thompson 60' | Report | Hutchinson 34'; Bojić (yellow card) 84' | Stadium: Telstra Dome; Attendance: 21,455; Referee: Strebre Delovski |

| 29 November 2008 13 | Perth Glory | 2–2 | Central Coast Mariners | Perth |
| 18:00 WDT | Dadi (yellow card) 29'; Harnwell (yellow card) 30'; Shroj (yellow card) 34'; Rukavytsya 55', 62'; Trinidad (yellow card) 76'; Djulbic (yellow card) 79' | Report | Jedinak 31'; Porter (yellow card) 53'; Simon (yellow card) 55'; Boogaard (red card) 90'; Petrovski 90+2' | Stadium: Members Equity Stadium; Attendance: 6,496; Referee: Peter O'Leary |

| 6 December 2008 14 | Central Coast Mariners | 1–1 | Queensland Roar | Gosford |
| 18:00 AEDT | D'Apuzzo (yellow card) 10'; Bojić (yellow card) 72'; Gumprecht 83' | Report | van Dijk 11'; DeVere (yellow card) 90+1' | Stadium: Bluetongue Stadium; Attendance: 8,995; Referee: Ben Williams |

| 13 December 2008 15 | Central Coast Mariners | 2–1 | Sydney FC | Gosford |
| 19:00 AEDT | Macallister 11'; Vuković (yellow card) 63'; Bojić (yellow card) 64'; Jedinak 90' (pen.) | Report | Aloisi 65' (pen.); Cole (yellow card) 90+2'; Fyfe (yellow card) 90+3' | Stadium: Bluetongue Stadium; Attendance: 11,220; Referee: Peter Green |

| 19 December 2008 16 | Wellington Phoenix | 1–0 | Central Coast Mariners | Wellington |
| 19:30 NZDT | Smeltz 2' (yellow card) 62'; Durante (yellow card) 90'; Brown (yellow card) 90+2' | Report | Caceres (yellow card) 45'; Porter (yellow card) 49'; Macallister (yellow card) 52' | Stadium: Westpac Stadium; Attendance: 6,722; Referee: Chris Beath |

| 26 December 2008 17 | Newcastle Jets | 1–2 | Central Coast Mariners | Newcastle |
| 20:00 AEDT | A. Griffiths (yellow card) 7'; J. Griffiths 9' (pen.) | Report | Petrovski (yellow card) 43' (goal) 67'; Simon 80' (yellow card) 90+4'; Macallister (red card) 90+4' | Stadium: EnergyAustralia Stadium; Attendance: 11,413; Referee: Peter O'Leary |

| 31 December 2008 18 | Central Coast Mariners | 1–0 | Perth Glory | Gosford |
| 18:00 AEDT | Heffernan (yellow card) 42'; Hutchinson 80' | Report | | Stadium: Bluetongue Stadium; Attendance: 15,546; Referee: Strebre Delovski |

| 10 January 2009 19 | Central Coast Mariners | 3–4 | Queensland Roar | Gosford |
| 19:00 AEDT | Mrdja 5'; Simon 55', 81'; Porter (yellow card) 59'; Caceres (yellow card) 73'; Clark (yellow card) 76' | Report | Moore (yellow card) 12' van Dijk 43', 48'; Minniecon 60'; Bojić 69' (o.g.) | Stadium: Bluetongue Stadium; Attendance: 11,454; Referee: Matthew Breeze |

| 16 January 2009 20 | Melbourne Victory | 3–0 | Central Coast Mariners | Melbourne |
| 20:00 AEDT | Allsopp 68'; Hernández 71'; Thompson 75' | Report | Clark (yellow card) 44'; Hutchinson (yellow card) 80'; Heffernan (red card) 87'; Porter (yellow card) 90+3' | Stadium: Telstra Dome; Attendance: 24,003; Referee: Peter Green |

| 25 January 2009 21 | Central Coast Mariners | 0–1 | Adelaide United | Gosford |
| 19:00 AEDT | Simon (yellow card) 74' | Report | Barbiero (yellow card) 26'; Cornthwaite (yellow card) 45+2'; Cristiano 82' | Stadium: Bluetongue Stadium; Attendance: 12,351; Referee: Matthew Breeze |

==== Finals series ====
===== Minor semi-final =====
| 6 February 2009 First leg | Central Coast Mariners | 0–2 | Queensland Roar | Gosford |
| 20:00 AEDT | | Report | Nichols 30'; Tiatto (yellow card) 34' (yellow-red card) 75' van Dijk 54' (pen.); Packer (yellow card) 56'; Zullo (yellow card) 58' | Stadium: Bluetongue Stadium; Attendance: 9,514; Referee: Ben Williams |

| 13 February 2009 Second leg | Queensland Roar | 2–1 (4–1 agg.) | Central Coast Mariners | Brisbane |
| 19:30 AEST | Nichols 21'; McKay 49' | Report | Boogaard (yellow card) 38'; O'Grady (yellow card) 45'; Mrdja 64'; Heffernan (yellow card) 80'; Hutchinson (yellow card) 85' | Stadium: Suncorp Stadium; Attendance: 23,705; Referee: Peter Green |

=== AFC Champions League ===
==== Group stage ====
| Pos | Team | Pld | W | D | L | GF | GA | GD | Pts | Qualification |
|---|---|---|---|---|---|---|---|---|---|---|
| 1 | (South Korea) Pohang Steelers | 6 | 3 | 3 | 0 | 7 | 3 | +4 | 12 | Advance to knockout stage |
| 2 | (Japan) Kawasaki Frontale | 6 | 3 | 1 | 2 | 10 | 7 | +3 | 10 | Advance to knockout stage |
| 3 | (China) Tianjin Teda | 6 | 2 | 2 | 2 | 6 | 5 | +1 | 8 | |
| 4 | (Australia) Central Coast Mariners | 6 | 0 | 2 | 4 | 5 | 13 | −8 | 2 | |

Source: WorldFootball.net

| 11 March 2009 1 | Central Coast Mariners (Australia) | 0–0 | (South Korea) Pohang Steelers | Gosford, Australia |
| 20:00 AEDT | Bojić (yellow card) 40'; Simon (yellow card) 82' | Report | Shin Hyung-min (yellow card) 78' | Stadium: Bluetongue Stadium; Attendance: 6,870; Referee: Khalil Al-Ghamdi (Saudi Arabia) |

| 18 March 2009 2 | Tianjin Teda (China) | 2–2 | (Australia) Central Coast Mariners | Tianjin, China |
| 20:00 CST | Éber 37'; Tan Wangsong (yellow card) 41'; Wu Weian 66'; Cao Yang (yellow card) 84' | Report | Simon (yellow card) 6' (goal) 61'; Boogaard (yellow card) 30'; Bojić (yellow card) 40'; Caceres 48' | Stadium: TEDA Football Stadium; Attendance: 27,005; Referee: Malik Abdul Bashir (Singapore) |

| 8 April 2009 3 | Central Coast Mariners (Australia) | 0–5 | (Japan) Kawasaki Frontale | Gosford, Australia |
| 20:00 (AEST) | Osman (yellow card) 10' | Report | Jong Tae-se 8'; Taniguchi 22'; Juninho 37'; Nakamura 49'; Renatinho 70' | Stadium: Bluetongue Stadium; Attendance: 9,419; Referee: Ravshan Irmatov (Uzbekistan) |

| 21 April 2009 4 | Kawasaki Frontale (Japan) | 2–1 | (Australia) Central Coast Mariners | Kawasaki, Japan |
| JST | Igawa (yellow card) 19'; Juninho 47'; Mori (yellow card) 73'; Renatinho 81' | Report | Boogaard (yellow card) 39'; Osman (yellow card) 39'; Simon 59'; Clark (yellow card) 79'; Gumprecht (yellow card) 84' | Stadium: Todoroki Athletics Stadium; Attendance: 8,419; Referee: Fareed Al-Marzouqi (United Arab Emirates) |

| 5 May 2009 5 | Pohang Steelers (South Korea) | 3–2 | (Australia) Central Coast Mariners | Pohang, South Korea |
| 13:00 (KST | Denílson 8' (pen.), 71', 88' | Report | Bojić (yellow card) 7'; Simon (yellow card) 27'; Kwasnik 54', 57' | Stadium: Pohang Steel Yard; Attendance: 11,539; Referee: Masoud Moradi (Iran) |

| 19 May 2009 6 | Central Coast Mariners (Australia) | 0–1 | (China) Tianjin Teda | Gosford, Australia |
| 20:00 (AEST | Caceres (yellow card) 90+5' | Report | Han Yanming (yellow card) 12'; Ma Leilei (yellow card) 34'; Mao Biao 64'; Zhao Yanming (yellow card) 90+3'; Fan Baiqun (yellow card) 90+4' | Stadium: Bluetongue Stadium; Attendance: 5,843; Referee: Muhsen Basma (Syria) |

== Statistics ==
=== Appearances ===
| No. | Pos | Nat | Player | Total | | A-League | | A-League finals | | Pre-Season Cup | | AFC Champions League | |
| No. | Pos | Nat | Player | Apps | Goals | Apps | Goals | Apps | Goals | Apps | Goals | Apps | Goals |
|---|---|---|---|---|---|---|---|---|---|---|---|---|---|
| 1 | GK | (Australia) AUS | Matthew Nash | 0 | 0 | 0 | 0 | 0 | 0 | 0 | 0 | 0 | 0 |
| 2 | MF | (Germany) GER | Andre Gumprecht | 17 | 1 | 5 + 6 | 1 | 1 | 0 | 2 | 0 | 2 + 1 | 0 |
| 3 | MF | (Australia) AUS | Shane Huke | 5 | 0 | 0 | 0 | 0 | 0 | 0 | 0 | 4 + 1 | 0 |
| 4 | DF | (Australia) AUS | Pedj Bojić | 27 | 0 | 20 | 0 | 1 | 0 | 1 | 0 | 5 | 0 |
| 5 | DF | (Australia) AUS | Brad Porter | 32 | 1 | 20 + 1 | 0 | 2 | 0 | 3 | 1 | 3 + 3 | 0 |
| 6 | DF | (Australia) AUS | David D'Apuzzo | 10 | 0 | 2 + 6 | 0 | 0 | 0 | 1 + 1 | 0 | 0 | 0 |
| 7 | MF | (Malta) MLT | John Hutchinson | 31 | 2 | 20 | 2 | 2 | 0 | 3 | 0 | 6 | 0 |
| 8 | DF | (Australia) AUS | Dean Heffernan | 14 | 0 | 5 + 1 | 0 | 1 | 0 | 1 | 0 | 6 | 0 |
| 9 | FW | (Australia) AUS | Nik Mrdja | 22 | 4 | 3 + 11 | 2 | 0 + 2 | 1 | 0 + 3 | 1 | 3 | 0 |
| 10 | MF | (Australia) AUS | Adrian Caceres | 29 | 3 | 17 + 3 | 2 | 1 + 1 | 0 | 3 | 0 | 2 + 2 | 1 |
| 11 | FW | (Australia) AUS | Dylan Macallister | 26 | 5 | 12 + 5 | 4 | 2 | 0 | 3 | 1 | 2 + 2 | 0 |
| 12 | MF | (Australia) AUS | Greg Owens | 1 | 0 | 0 + 1 | 0 | 0 | 0 | 0 | 0 | 0 | 0 |
| 13 | DF | (Australia) AUS | Paul O'Grady | 9 | 0 | 3 + 4 | 0 | 2 | 0 | 0 | 0 | 0 | 0 |
| 15 | DF | (Australia) AUS | Andrew Clark | 18 | 0 | 7 + 4 | 0 | 1 + 1 | 0 | 2 | 0 | 3 | 0 |
| 16 | DF | (Australia) AUS | Nigel Boogaard | 18 | 0 | 11 | 0 | 1 | 0 | 1 | 0 | 5 | 0 |
| 17 | MF | (Australia) AUS | Matthew Osman | 27 | 1 | 13 + 4 | 1 | 2 | 0 | 2 + 1 | 0 | 5 | 0 |
| 18 | DF | (Australia) AUS | Alex Wilkinson | 32 | 0 | 21 | 0 | 2 | 0 | 3 | 0 | 6 | 0 |
| 19 | FW | (Australia) AUS | Matt Simon | 25 | 13 | 16 + 3 | 11 | 2 | 0 | 0 | 0 | 4 | 2 |
| 20 | GK | (Australia) AUS | Danny Vuković | 27 | 0 | 16 | 0 | 2 | 0 | 2 + 1 | 0 | 6 | 0 |
| 21 | MF | (Australia) AUS | Ahmad Elrich | 9 | 1 | 3 | 0 | 0 | 0 | 2 | 1 | 1 + 3 | 0 |
| 22 | MF | (Australia) AUS | Nick Rizzo | 1 | 0 | 0 | 0 | 0 | 0 | 0 | 0 | 0 + 1 | 0 |
| 23 | MF | (Australia) AUS | Adam Kwasnik | 4 | 2 | 0 | 0 | 0 | 0 | 0 | 0 | 3 + 1 | 2 |
| 25 | FW | (Australia) AUS | Brady Smith | 1 | 0 | 0 | 0 | 0 | 0 | 1 | 0 | 0 | 0 |
| 25 | DF | (Australia) AUS | Nathan Sherlock | 0 | 0 | 0 | 0 | 0 | 0 | 0 | 0 | 0 | 0 |
| 28 | MF | (Australia) AUS | Matthew Lewis | 1 | 0 | 0 + 1 | 0 | 0 | 0 | 0 | 0 | 0 | 0 |
| 30 | GK | (Australia) AUS | Andrew Redmayne | 2 | 0 | 1 + 1 | 0 | 0 | 0 | 0 | 0 | 0 | 0 |
Players who made appearances but left the club during the season:
| 22 | FW | (Australia) AUS | Sasho Petrovski | 25 | 7 | 16 + 4 | 6 | 0 + 2 | 0 | 3 | 1 | 0 | 0 |
| 23 | MF | (Australia) AUS | Mile Jedinak | 15 | 6 | 15 | 6 | 0 | 0 | 0 | 0 | 0 | 0 |
| 24 | MF | (Italy) ITA | Andrea Merenda | 0 | 0 | 0 | 0 | 0 | 0 | 0 | 0 | 0 | 0 |
| 26 | MF | (Australia) AUS | Chris Tadrosse | 1 | 0 | 1 | 0 | 0 | 0 | 0 | 0 | 0 | 0 |
| 40 | GK | (Australia) AUS | Mark Bosnich | 6 | 0 | 4 | 0 | 0 | 0 | 1 + 1 | 0 | 0 | 0 |

=== Goalscorers ===
Includes all competitive matches. The list is sorted by shirt number when total goals are equal.

| Rank | Pos. | No. | Player | A-League | Finals | Pre-Season Challenge Cup | AFC Champions League | Total |
|---|---|---|---|---|---|---|---|---|
| 1 | FW | 19 | (Australia) Matt Simon | 11 | 0 | 0 | 2 | 13 |
| 2 | FW | 22 | (Australia) Sasho Petrovski | 6 | 0 | 1 | 0 | 7 |
| 3 | MF | 23 | (Australia) Mile Jedinak | 6 | 0 | 0 | 0 | 6 |
| 4 | FW | 11 | (Australia) Dylan Macallister | 4 | 0 | 1 | 0 | 5 |
| 5 | FW | 9 | (Australia) Nik Mrdja | 2 | 1 | 1 | 0 | 4 |
| 6 | MF | 10 | (Australia) Adrian Caceres | 2 | 0 | 0 | 1 | 3 |
| 7 | MF | 7 | (Malta) John Hutchinson | 2 | 0 | 0 | 0 | 2 |
| 7 | FW | 23 | (Australia) Adam Kwasnik | 0 | 0 | 0 | 2 | 2 |
| 9 | MF | 2 | (Germany) André Gumprecht | 1 | 0 | 0 | 0 | 1 |
| 9 | DF | 17 | (Australia) Matthew Osman | 1 | 0 | 0 | 0 | 1 |
| 9 | DF | 5 | (Australia) Brad Porter | 0 | 0 | 1 | 0 | 1 |
| 9 | MF | 21 | (Australia) Ahmad Elrich | 0 | 0 | 1 | 0 | 1 |
| Total | | | | 35 | 1 | 5 | 5 | 46 |

=== Clean sheets ===
| Rank | Pos. | No. | Player | A-League | Finals | Pre-Season Challenge Cup | AFC Champions League | Total |
|---|---|---|---|---|---|---|---|---|
| 1 | GK | 20 | (Australia) Danny Vuković | 3 | 0 | 0 | 1 | 4 |
| 2 | GK | 40 | (Australia) Mark Bosnich | 1 | 0 | 0 | 0 | 1 |

=== Disciplinary record ===
As of 17 May 2014

| R. | Name | A-League | | A-League finals | | Pre-Season Cup | | AFC Champions League | | Total | |
| R. | Name | Yellow card | Red card | Yellow card | Red card | Yellow card | Red card | Yellow card | Red card | Yellow card | Red card |
|---|---|---|---|---|---|---|---|---|---|---|---|
| 1 | Pedj Bojić | 7 | 0 | 0 | 0 | 0 | 0 | 3 | 0 | 10 | 0 |
| 2 | Matt Simon | 6 | 0 | 0 | 0 | 0 | 0 | 3 | 0 | 9 | 0 |
| 3 | Andrew Clark | 5 | 0 | 0 | 0 | 2 | 0 | 1 | 0 | 8 | 0 |
| 3 | Nigel Boogaard | 1 | 1 | 1 | 0 | 1 | 0 | 2 | 0 | 5 | 1 |
| 5 | Dylan Macallister | 2 | 1 | 0 | 0 | 1 | 0 | 0 | 0 | 3 | 1 |
| 6 | Sasho Petrovski | 4 | 0 | 0 | 0 | 1 | 0 | 0 | 0 | 5 | 0 |
| 6 | Brad Porter | 4 | 0 | 0 | 0 | 1 | 0 | 0 | 0 | 5 | 0 |
| 6 | Dean Heffernan | 1 | 1 | 1 | 0 | 0 | 0 | 0 | 0 | 2 | 1 |
| 6 | John Hutchinson | 3 | 0 | 1 | 0 | 1 | 0 | 0 | 0 | 5 | 0 |
| 10 | Adrian Caceres | 2 | 0 | 0 | 0 | 0 | 0 | 1 | 0 | 3 | 0 |
| 11 | Alex Wilkinson | 2 | 0 | 0 | 0 | 0 | 0 | 0 | 0 | 2 | 0 |
| 11 | Paul O'Grady | 1 | 0 | 1 | 0 | 0 | 0 | 0 | 0 | 2 | 0 |
| 11 | David D'Apuzzo | 1 | 0 | 0 | 0 | 1 | 0 | 0 | 0 | 2 | 0 |
| 11 | Matthew Osman | 0 | 0 | 0 | 0 | 0 | 0 | 2 | 0 | 2 | 0 |
| 15 | Danny Vuković | 1 | 0 | 0 | 0 | 0 | 0 | 0 | 0 | 1 | 0 |
| 15 | André Gumprecht | 0 | 0 | 0 | 0 | 0 | 0 | 1 | 0 | 1 | 0 |

== Awards ==
- PFA A-League Team of the Season: Mile Jedinak

The Mariners Medal dinner was held in early March 2009, in Tumbi Umbi:

- Mariners Medal (players' player of the year): Matt Simon
- Marinators Goal of the Year (fan-voted): John Hutchinson, for his long-range strike against Perth Glory on 31 December 2008
- Golden Boot: Matt Simon
- Chairman's Award: Ben Coonan (media officer)
