= 2009–10 Central Coast Mariners FC season =

Central Coast Mariners FC
2009-10 season
- Manager: Lawrie McKinna
- A-League: 8th
- Top goalscorer: League: Matt Simon (7); All: Matt Simon (7)
- Highest home attendance: 11,137 (vs. Wellington Phoenix, 31 December 2009)
- Lowest home attendance: 5,193 (vs. Perth Glory, 4 September 2009)
- Average home league attendance: 7,444

The 2009–10 season is Central Coast's 5th season since the inception of the A-League.

== Players ==
=== Senior squad ===
Note: Flags indicate national team as defined under FIFA eligibility rules; some limited exceptions apply. Players may hold more than one non-FIFA nationality.

| No. | Pos. | Nation | Player |
|---|---|---|---|
| 1 | GK | AUS | Andrew Redmayne |
| 2 | MF | WAL | Matthew Crowell |
| 3 | MF | AUS | Shane Huke |
| 4 | DF | AUS | Predrag Bojić |
| 5 | MF | AUS | Brad Porter |
| 6 | FW | AUS | Brady Smith |
| 7 | MF | MLT | John Hutchinson (vice-captain) |
| 9 | FW | AUS | Nik Mrdja |
| 10 | MF | AUS | Panny Nikas |
| 11 | FW | AUS | Dylan Macallister |
| 12 | MF | AUS | Matthew Lewis |
| 13 | FW | WAL | Jonathan Brown |
| 15 | DF | AUS | Andrew Clark |
| 16 | DF | AUS | Nigel Boogaard |

| No. | Pos. | Nation | Player |
|---|---|---|---|
| 17 | DF | SCO | Chris Doig |
| 18 | DF | AUS | Alex Wilkinson (captain) |
| 19 | FW | AUS | Matthew Simon |
| 20 | GK | AUS | Danny Vukovic |
| 21 | MF | AUS | Ahmed Elrich |
| 22 | MF | ENG | Nicky Travis |
| 23 | FW | AUS | Adam Kwasnik |
| 24 | FW | AUS | Bernie Ibini-Isei |
| 24 | MF | AUS | Lachlan Cahill (Injury replacement) |
| 25 | MF | AUS | Mitchell Mallia |
| 27 | MF | JAM | Wolry Wolfe (Injury replacement) |
| 29 | MF | AUS | Nicholas Fitzgerald |
| 30 | GK | AUS | Mathew Ryan |

=== Youth League squad ===
Note: Flags indicate national team as defined under FIFA eligibility rules; some limited exceptions apply. Players may hold more than one non-FIFA nationality.

| No. | Pos. | Nation | Player |
|---|---|---|---|
| 6 | FW | AUS | Brady Smith |
| 10 | MF | AUS | Panny Nikas |
| 24 | FW | AUS | Bernie Ibini-Isei |
| 25 | MF | AUS | Mitchell Mallia |
| 29 | MF | AUS | Nicholas Fitzgerald |
| 30 | GK | AUS | Mathew Ryan |
| — | GK | AUS | Nathan Kenyon |
| — | GK | AUS | Nik Matic |
| — | DF | AUS | Luka Dukic |

| No. | Pos. | Nation | Player |
|---|---|---|---|
| — | DF | AUS | Manny Giannaros |
| — | DF | AUS | Jerry Kalouris |
| — | DF | AUS | Matthew Liddall |
| — | DF | AUS | Adam Ormsby |
| — | DF | AUS | Nathan Sherlock |
| — | MF | AUS | Brendan Griffin |
| — | MF | AUS | David Gullo |
| — | MF | AUS | Graz Trimboli |
| — | FW | AUS | Gavin Forbes |

=== Transfers ===
==== In ====
| Date | Pos. | Name | From | Fee |
|---|---|---|---|---|
| 10 June 2009 | DF | (Scotland) Chris Doig | (England) Northampton Town | Free |
| 31 July 2009 | MF | (New Zealand) Michael McGlinchey | Unattached | Free |
| 1 August 2009 | MF | (England) Nicky Travis | (England) Sheffield United | Free |
| 2 September 2009 | MF | (Jamaica) Wolry Wolfe | (Jamaica) Joe Public | Free |
| 23 September 2009 | MF | (Australia) Lachlan Cahill | Unattached | Free |
| 23 September 2009 | MF | (Wales) Matt Crowell | Unattached | Free |
| 14 January 2010 | MF | (Wales) Jonathan Brown | Unattached | Free |

==== Out ====
| Date | Pos. | Name | To | Fee |
|---|---|---|---|---|
| 28 November 2008 | DF | (Australia) Matthew Osman | (Australia) Gold Coast United | Free |
| 20 May 2009 | MF | (Germany) André Gumprecht | Released | Free |
| 20 May 2009 | DF | (Australia) Paul O'Grady | Released | Free |
| 20 May 2009 | MF | (Australia) Greg Owens | Released | Free |
| 20 May 2009 | MF | (Australia) Nick Rizzo | Released | Free |
| 1 September 2009 | MF | (Australia) Adrian Caceres | (New Zealand) Wellington Phoenix | Free |
| 23 September 2009 | MF | (Jamaica) Wolry Wolfe | Unattached | Free |
| 29 January 2010 | DF | (Australia) Dean Heffernan | (England) Huddersfield Town | Free |

==== Loan out ====
| Date from | Date to | Pos. | Name | To |
|---|---|---|---|---|
| 3 February 2010 | 9 May 2010 | MF | (New Zealand) Michael McGlinchey | (Scotland) Motherwell |

== Pre-season and friendlies ==
| 5 June 2009 | Logan United | 1–2 | Central Coast Mariners | Logan |
| 19:30 AEST | Davani 32' (pen.) | Report | Mrdja 34'; Bojić | Stadium: Clem Jones Field; Attendance: 500; Referee: Peter Green |

| 7 June 2009 | North Queensland Fury | 0–1 | Central Coast Mariners | Rockhampton |
| 17:00 AEST | | Report | Di Vicino 23' | Stadium: Jardine Park; Attendance: 2,000; Referee: Alan Milliner |

| 6 July 2009 | Sydney FC | 0–0 | Central Coast Mariners | Sydney |
| 19:00 AEST | Heffernan (yellow card) 48' | Report | | Stadium: Leichhardt Oval; Attendance: 1,540; Referee: Stuart Wolfe |

| 10 July 2009 Booz and Co. Cup | Belconnen United | 0–3 | Central Coast Mariners | Canberra |
| | | Report | Lim Dong-sup 68'; Wales 71'; Elrich 76' | Attendance: 550; Referee: Richard Naumovski |

| 12 July 2009 | Capital Football XI | 3–3 | Central Coast Mariners | Canberra |
| 13:00 AEST | Heffernan (yellow card) 13'; Travis 31'; Caceres 52'; Bojić 57' | Report | Gecic 20' (yellow card) 38'; Jones (yellow card) 37'; Giampalo 50'; Castro (yellow card) 57'; Wilkinson 90' (o.g.) | Stadium: Australian Institute of Sport; Attendance: 1,400; Referee: Ben Williams |

| 18 July 2009 | Gold Coast United | 2–2 | Central Coast Mariners | Gold Coast |
| | Pantelidis (yellow card) 28'; Thwaite (yellow card) 35' (red card) 48' van den Brink (yellow card) 80'; Adama Traoré 81'; Smeltz 90+1' | Report | Bojić 48'; Kwasnik 53'; Porter (yellow card) 86' | Stadium: Skilled Park; Attendance: 1,000; Referee: Matthew Gillett |

| 26 July 2009 | Central Coast Mariners | 0–0 | Wellington Phoenix | Dubbo |
| 18:00 AEST | | Report | Brown (yellow card) 67' | Stadium: Apex Oval; Attendance: 2,500; Referee: Stuart Wolfe |

== 2009-10 Hyundai A-League fixtures ==
| 6 August 2009 | Melbourne Victory | 0–2 | Central Coast Mariners | Etihad Stadium, Melbourne |
| 19:30 UTC+10 | | Report; Summary | Simon 10'; McGlinchey 16' | Attendance: 18,885; Referee: (Australia) Matthew Breeze |

| 14 August 2009 | Central Coast Mariners | 1–1 | Newcastle Jets | Bluetongue Stadium, Gosford |
| 20:00 UTC+10 | Boogaard 50' | Report; Summary | Song 47' | Attendance: 9,573; Referee: (Australia) Ben Williams |

| 22 August 2009 | Central Coast Mariners | 0–0 | Sydney FC | Bluetongue Stadium, Gosford |
| 15:00 UTC+10 | | Report; Summary | | Attendance: 10,029; Referee: (Australia) Strebre Delovski |

| 29 August 2009 | Brisbane Roar | 1–0 | Central Coast Mariners | Suncorp Stadium, Brisbane |
| 15:00 UTC+10 | Moore 11' | Report; Summary | | Attendance: 6,433; Referee: (Australia) Ben Williams |

| 4 September 2009 | Central Coast Mariners | 2–1 | Perth Glory | Canberra Stadium, Canberra |
| 20:00 UTC+10 | Wilkinson 42'; Simon 89' | Report; Summary | Sterjovski 82' | Attendance: 5,193; Referee: (Australia) Ben Williams |

| 11 September 2009 | Adelaide United | 1–0 | Central Coast Mariners | Hindmarsh Stadium, Adelaide |
| 19:30 UTC+9:30 | Cássio 33' | Report; Summary | | Attendance: 10,262; Referee: (Australia) Strebre Delovski |

| 19 September 2009 | Central Coast Mariners | 3–0 | Gold Coast United | Bluetongue Stadium, Gosford |
| 19:30 UTC+10 | Travis 26'; Simon 54'; Hutchinson 70' | Report; Summary | Smeltz (yellow card) 9' (yellow-red card) 69' | Attendance: 7,943; Referee: (Australia) Matthew Breeze |

| 27 September 2009 | Wellington Phoenix | 0–0 | Central Coast Mariners | Westpac Stadium, Wellington |
| 16:00 UTC+13 | | Report; Summary | | Attendance: 6,769; Referee: (New Zealand) Michael Hester |

| 5 October 2009 | Sydney FC | 1–0 | Central Coast Mariners | Sydney Football Stadium, Sydney |
| 15:00 UTC+11 | McFlynn 20' | Report; Summary | | Attendance: 13,887; Referee: (Australia) Matthew Breeze |

| 11 October 2009 | Central Coast Mariners | 1–1 | North Queensland Fury | Bluetongue Stadium, Gosford |
| 15:00 UTC+11 | Simon 1' | Report; Summary | McBreen 75' | Attendance: 8,042; Referee: (Australia) Ryan Shepheard |

| 17 October 2009 | Brisbane Roar | 0–3 | Central Coast Mariners | Suncorp Stadium, Brisbane |
| 17:30 UTC+10 | | Report; Summary | Travis 4'; Hutchinson 18'; Bojić 70' | Attendance: 7,434; Referee: (Australia) Peter Green |

| 23 October 2009 | Newcastle Jets | 2–1 | Central Coast Mariners | EnergyAustralia Stadium, Newcastle |
| 20:00 UTC+11 | Bridges 8'; Haliti 14' | Report; Summary | Kwasnik 19' | Attendance: 6,188; Referee: (Australia) Strebre Delovski |

| 31 October 2009 | Central Coast Mariners | 0–0 | Adelaide United | Canberra Stadium, Canberra |
| 19:00 UTC+11 | Crowell (yellow card) 78' (yellow-red card) 83' | Report; Summary | | Attendance: 5,437; Referee: (Australia) Ben Williams |

| 7 November 2009 | Melbourne Victory | 0–4 | Central Coast Mariners | Etihad Stadium, Melbourne |
| 19:00 UTC+11 | | Report; Summary | Kwasnik 15'; Simon 75'; Heffernan 80'; Mrdja 84' | Attendance: 18,531; Referee: (Australia) Strebre Delovski |

| 21 November 2009 | North Queensland Fury | 1–5 | Central Coast Mariners | Dairy Farmers Stadium, Townsville |
| 20:00 UTC+10 | R. Griffiths 68' | Report; Summary | Bojić 22'; Mrdja 35', 59'; A. Elrich 62'; Hutchinson 82' | Attendance: 7,587; Referee: (Australia) Gerard Parsons |

| 27 November 2009 | Central Coast Mariners | 0–0 | Perth Glory | Bluetongue Stadium, Gosford |
| 20:00 UTC+11 | | Report; Summary | | Attendance: 7,857; Referee: (Australia) Gerard Parsons |

| 5 December 2009 | Gold Coast United | 2–1 | Central Coast Mariners | Skilled Park, Gold Coast |
| 20:00 UTC+10 | Smeltz 67'; Barisic 76' | Report; Summary | Simon 38' | Attendance: 4,117; Referee: (Australia) Peter Green |

| 12 December 2009 | Central Coast Mariners | 0–3 | Melbourne Victory | Bluetongue Stadium, Gosford |
| 19:00 UTC+11 | | Report; Summary | Hernández 57'; Kemp 70'; Boogaard 77' (o.g.) | Attendance: 7,571; Referee: (Australia) Ryan Shepheard |

| 23 December 2009 | Sydney FC | 1–0 | Central Coast Mariners | Sydney Football Stadium, Sydney |
| 19:30 UTC+11 | Brosque 34' | Report; Summary | | Attendance: 12,689; Referee: (Australia) Matthew Breeze |

| 19 December 2009 | Central Coast Mariners | 2–3 | Brisbane Roar | Bluetongue Stadium, Gosford |
| 18:00 UTC+11 | Travis 35'; Macallister 77' | Report; Summary | Oar 10' van Dijk 22'; McKay 90+1' | Attendance: 5,684; Referee: (Australia) Alan Milliner |

| 31 December 2009 | Central Coast Mariners | 0–2 | Wellington Phoenix | Bluetongue Stadium, Gosford |
| 18:00 UTC+11 | | Report; Summary | Ifill 47' (pen.), 81' | Attendance: 11,137; Referee: (Australia) Matthew Breeze |

| 9 January 2010 | Central Coast Mariners | 1–1 | North Queensland Fury | Bluetongue Stadium, Gosford |
| 19:00 UTC+11 | Mrdja 3' | Report; Summary | Brockie 20' | Attendance: 6,556; Referee: (Australia) Ryan Shepheard |

| 15 January 2010 | Adelaide United | 1–1 | Central Coast Mariners | Hindmarsh Stadium, Adelaide |
| 19:30 UTC+10:30 | T. Dodd 43' | Report; Summary | Mrdja 39' (pen.) | Attendance: 10,156; Referee: (Australia) Chris Beath |

| 22 January 2010 | Central Coast Mariners | 1–1 | Gold Coast United | Bluetongue Stadium, Gosford |
| 20:00 UTC+11 | Mrdja 68' (pen.); Boogaard (yellow card) 69' (yellow-red card) 90+1' | Report; Summary | J. Porter 66' | Attendance: 5,724; Referee: (Australia) Chris Beath |

| 31 January 2010 | Perth Glory | 3–1 | Central Coast Mariners | ME Bank Stadium, Perth |
| 16:00 UTC+8 | McBreen 1', 13'; Jukic 45+1' | Report; Summary | Kwasnik 49' | Attendance: 8,160; Referee: (Australia) Gerard Parsons |

| 8 February 2010 | Central Coast Mariners | 3–0 | Newcastle Jets | Bluetongue Stadium, Gosford |
| 19:30 UTC+11 | Bojic (yellow card) 79' (yellow-red card) 88'; Boogaard 17'; Kwasnik 50'; Simon 72' | Report; Summary | Haliti (yellow card) 49' (yellow-red card) 57' | Attendance: 5,842; Referee: (Australia) Peter Green |

| 12 February 2010 | Wellington Phoenix | 3–0 | Central Coast Mariners | Westpac Stadium, Wellington |
| 19:30 UTC+13 | T. Brown 14'; Ifill 79', 81' | Report; Summary | | Attendance: 14,327; Referee: (Australia) Chris Beath |

| Pos | Team | Pld | W | D | L | GF | GA | GD | Pts | Qualification |
|---|---|---|---|---|---|---|---|---|---|---|
| 1 | Sydney FC (C) | 27 | 15 | 3 | 9 | 35 | 23 | +12 | 48 | Qualification for 2011 AFC Champions League group stage and Finals series |
| 2 | Melbourne Victory | 27 | 14 | 5 | 8 | 47 | 32 | +15 | 47 | Qualification for 2011 AFC Champions League group stage and Finals series |
| 3 | Gold Coast United | 27 | 13 | 5 | 9 | 39 | 35 | +4 | 44 | Qualification for Finals series |
| 4 | Wellington Phoenix | 27 | 10 | 10 | 7 | 37 | 29 | +8 | 40 | Qualification for Finals series |
| 5 | Perth Glory | 27 | 11 | 6 | 10 | 40 | 34 | +6 | 39 | Qualification for Finals series |
| 6 | Newcastle Jets | 27 | 10 | 4 | 13 | 33 | 45 | −12 | 34 | Qualification for Finals series |
| 7 | North Queensland Fury | 27 | 8 | 8 | 11 | 29 | 46 | −17 | 32 | |
| 8 | Central Coast Mariners | 27 | 7 | 9 | 11 | 32 | 29 | +3 | 30 | |
| 9 | Brisbane Roar | 27 | 8 | 6 | 13 | 32 | 42 | −10 | 30 | |
| 10 | Adelaide United | 27 | 7 | 8 | 12 | 24 | 33 | −9 | 29 | |

Source: ultimatealeague.com
Rules for classification: 1) points; 2) goal difference; 3) number of goals scored.
(C) Champions

== Statistics ==
=== Appearances ===
| No. | Pos | Nat | Player | Total | | A-League | |
| No. | Pos | Nat | Player | Apps | Goals | Apps | Goals |
|---|---|---|---|---|---|---|---|
| 1 | GK | (Australia) AUS | Andrew Redmayne | 1 | 0 | 1 | 0 |
| 2 | MF | (Wales) WAL | Matt Crowell | 13 | 0 | 9+4 | 0 |
| 3 | MF | (Australia) AUS | Shane Huke | 3 | 0 | 3 | 0 |
| 4 | DF | (Australia) AUS | Pedj Bojić | 25 | 2 | 23+2 | 2 |
| 5 | DF | (Australia) AUS | Brad Porter | 25 | 0 | 21+4 | 0 |
| 6 | FW | (Australia) AUS | Brady Smith | 2 | 0 | 1+1 | 0 |
| 7 | MF | (Malta) MLT | John Hutchinson | 23 | 3 | 23 | 3 |
| 10 | MF | (Australia) AUS | Panny Nikas | 3 | 0 | 2+1 | 0 |
| 11 | FW | (Australia) AUS | Dylan Macallister | 17 | 1 | 5+12 | 1 |
| 12 | MF | (Australia) AUS | Matthew Lewis | 6 | 0 | 4+2 | 0 |
| 13 | MF | (Wales) WAL | Jonathan Brown | 0 | 0 | 0 | 0 |
| 15 | DF | (Australia) AUS | Andrew Clark | 17 | 0 | 9+8 | 0 |
| 16 | DF | (Australia) AUS | Nigel Boogaard | 25 | 2 | 25 | 2 |
| 17 | DF | (Scotland) SCO | Chris Doig | 13 | 0 | 13 | 0 |
| 18 | DF | (Australia) AUS | Alex Wilkinson | 27 | 1 | 27 | 1 |
| 19 | FW | (Australia) AUS | Matt Simon | 25 | 7 | 24+1 | 7 |
| 20 | GK | (Australia) AUS | Danny Vuković | 26 | 0 | 26 | 0 |
| 21 | MF | (Australia) AUS | Ahmad Elrich | 12 | 1 | 3+9 | 1 |
| 22 | MF | (England) ENG | Nicky Travis | 20 | 3 | 14+6 | 3 |
| 23 | FW | (Australia) AUS | Adam Kwasnik | 23 | 4 | 15+8 | 4 |
| 24 | FW | (Australia) AUS | Bernie Ibini-Isei | 1 | 0 | 0+1 | 0 |
| 25 | MF | (Australia) AUS | Mitchell Mallia | 1 | 0 | 0+1 | 0 |
| 29 | MF | (Australia) AUS | Nicholas Fitzgerald | 1 | 0 | 0+1 | 0 |
| 30 | GK | (Australia) AUS | Mathew Ryan | 0 | 0 | 0 | 0 |
Players who made appearances but left the club during the season:
| 8 | DF | (Australia) AUS | Dean Heffernan | 20 | 1 | 19+1 | 1 |
| 9 | FW | (Australia) AUS | Nik Mrdja | 17 | 6 | 11+6 | 6 |
| 14 | MF | (New Zealand) NZL | Michael McGlinchey | 21 | 1 | 18+3 | 1 |
| 24 | MF | (Australia) AUS | Lachlan Cahill | 0 | 0 | 0 | 0 |
| 27 | MF | (Jamaica) JAM | Wolry Wolfe | 0 | 0 | 0 | 0 |

=== Goalscorers ===
Includes all competitive matches. The list is sorted by shirt number when total goals are equal.

| Rank | Pos. | No. | Player | A-League | Total |
|---|---|---|---|---|---|
| 1 | FW | 19 | (Australia) Matt Simon | 7 | 7 |
| 2 | FW | 9 | (Australia) Nik Mrdja | 6 | 6 |
| 3 | FW | 23 | (Australia) Adam Kwasnik | 4 | 4 |
| 4 | MF | 7 | (Malta) John Hutchinson | 3 | 3 |
| 4 | MF | 22 | (England) Nicky Travis | 3 | 3 |
| 6 | DF | 4 | (Australia) Pedj Bojić | 2 | 2 |
| 6 | DF | 16 | (Australia) Nigel Boogaard | 2 | 2 |
| 8 | DF | 8 | (Australia) Dean Heffernan | 1 | 1 |
| 8 | FW | 11 | (Australia) Dylan Macallister | 1 | 1 |
| 8 | MF | 14 | (New Zealand) Michael McGlinchey | 1 | 1 |
| 8 | DF | 18 | (Australia) Alex Wilkinson | 1 | 1 |
| 8 | MF | 21 | (Australia) Ahmad Elrich | 1 | 1 |
| Total | | | | 32 | 32 |
