= 2010–11 Central Coast Mariners FC season =

Central Coast Mariners
2010–11 season
- Chairman: Ian Kiernan
- Manager: Graham Arnold
- A-League: 2nd
- Finals series: 2nd
- Top goalscorer: League: Matt Simon (11); All: Matt Simon (11)
Home colours	Away colours

The 2010–11 season was Central Coast Mariners' 6th season in the A-League since its inception in 2005.

== Matches ==
=== 2010–11 Pre-season friendly fixtures ===
17 June 2010	Central Coast Lightning	1–7	Central Coast Mariners	Pluim Park
	Toope 44'	Report	Rose 13'; Simon 22'; McBreen 30'; Kwasnik 47'; Porter 64'; Gallagher 75'; Lewis 84'	Attendance: 1105; Referee: Ryan Shepheard

22 June 2010	Bankstown City Lions	2–2	Central Coast Mariners	Jensen Park
	Martin 15' (pen.); Huseyin 79' (pen.)	Report	McBreen 7' (pen.); Bozanic 26'

29 June 2010	Blacktown City	1–1	Central Coast Mariners	Lily Homes Stadium
	Ibini-Isei 7'	Report	McBreen 60'

1 July 2010	Northern Tigers FC	0–0	Central Coast Mariners	Mills Park

5 July 2010	Canberra FC	0–4	Central Coast Mariners	Deakin Stadium
		Report	Kwasnik 18' 36' 53'; McBreen 54'

7 July 2010	Belconnen United FC	1–4	Central Coast Mariners	McKellar Park
	Wells 44' (pen.)	Report	Simon 29'; Porter 31'; Kwasnik 32'; Hutchinson 83'

14 July 2010	Central Coast Select XI	0–5	Central Coast Mariners
		Report	Amini 23'; Kwasnik 31'; Smith 71'; Mrdja 81'; Bozanic 86'	Referee: Gerard Parsons

17 July 2010	Sydney FC	2–2	Central Coast Mariners	Sydney Showground (Homebush Bay)
	Brosque 1'; Bridge 60'	Report	Kwasnik 59'; Simon 66'

25 July 2010	Central Coast Mariners	0–0	Melbourne Victory FC	Aurora Stadium
		Report		Attendance: 5,000 (approx)

27 July 2010	Tasmanian Select XI	0–3	Central Coast Mariners	KGV Soccer Park, Hobart
		Report	Simon 76'; Bozanic 80'; Kwasnik 90+1'	Attendance: 2,000 (approx); Referee: Lucien Laverdure

=== 2010–11 Hyundai A-League fixtures ===
5 August 2010	Melbourne Heart	0–1	Central Coast Mariners	AAMI Park, Melbourne
Thursday 19:30 EST		Report; Summary	Wilkinson 16'	Attendance: 11,050; Referee: (Australia) Chris Beath

15 August 2010	Central Coast Mariners	1–1	Adelaide United	Bluetongue Stadium, Gosford
Sunday 15:00 EST	Simon 86'	Report; Summary	Fyfe 45+2'; A. Hughes (yellow card) 15' (yellow-red card) 87'	Attendance: 8,447; Referee: (Australia) Kris Griffiths-Jones

22 August 2010	Wellington Phoenix	2–0	Central Coast Mariners	Westpac Stadium, Wellington
Sunday 15:00 NZST	Bertos 10'; Ifill 61'	Report; Summary		Attendance: 9,553; Referee: (New Zealand) Peter O'Leary

28 August 2010	Sydney FC	1–1	Central Coast Mariners	Sydney Football Stadium, Sydney
Saturday 19:30 EST	Grant 47'; Reddy (red card) 71' (Note: Sydney FC's Liam Reddy received a direct red card in the week 4 fixture against Central Coast Mariners. However, this was overruled by the match review panel and expunged from Reddy and the team's records.)	Report; Summary	Pérez 73' (pen.)	Attendance: 10,147; Referee: (Australia) Matthew Breeze

3 September 2010	Central Coast Mariners	2–0	Melbourne Victory FC	Bluetongue Stadium, Gosford
Friday 20:00 EST	Rostyn Griffiths 21'; McBreen 50'	Report; Summary		Attendance: 6,829; Referee: (Australia) Chris Beath

10 September 2010	Central Coast Mariners	1–0	Melbourne Heart	Bluetongue Stadium, Gosford
Friday 20:00 EST	McBreen 20'	Report; Summary	Beauchamp (red card) 52'	Attendance: 6,326; Referee: (Australia) Peter Green

19 September 2010	Gold Coast United FC	0–0	Central Coast Mariners	Skilled Park, Gold Coast
Sunday 17:00 EST		Report; Summary		Attendance: 2,037; Referee: (Australia) Matthew Gillett

2 October 2010	Central Coast Mariners	3–2	North Queensland Fury	Bluetongue Stadium, Gosford
Saturday 17:15 EST	Simon 47'; Pérez 57' (pen.); Zwaanswijk 90+1'	Report; Summary	Storey 12'; McBreen 78' (o.g.); Daal (yellow card) 45' (yellow-red card) 80'	Attendance: 6,656; Referee: (Australia) Kurt Ams

20 October 2010	Brisbane Roar	2–0	Central Coast Mariners	Suncorp Stadium, Brisbane
Wednesday 19:00 EST	Broich 21'; I. Franjic 61'	Report; Summary		Attendance: 5,051; Referee: (Australia) Chris Beath

30 October 2010	Central Coast Mariners	5–0	Perth Glory	Sydney Football Stadium, Sydney
Saturday 19:30 EDT	Rostyn Griffiths 37'; Simon 60'; Kwasnik 78'; Lewis 87'; Sekulovski 90' (o.g.)	Report; Summary		Attendance: 10,746; Referee: (Australia) Ryan Shepheard

5 November 2010	North Queensland Fury	0–1	Central Coast Mariners	Dairy Farmers Stadium, Townsville
Friday 19:30 EST		Report; Summary	Zwaanswijk 36'	Attendance: 3,625; Referee: (Australia) Gerard Parsons

13 November 2010	Wellington Phoenix	0–3	Central Coast Mariners	Westpac Stadium, Wellington
Saturday 19:30 NZDT		Report; Summary	Rose 17', 80'; Kwasnik 86'	Attendance: 5,778; Referee: (Australia) Peter Green

18 November 2010	Melbourne Victory FC	2–2	Central Coast Mariners	AAMI Park, Melbourne
Thursday 19:30 EDT	Vargas 62'; Hernández 64'	Report; Summary	McBreen 29'; Kwasnik 78'	Attendance: 9,674; Referee: (Australia) Gerard Parsons

21 November 2010	Central Coast Mariners	2–3	Gold Coast United FC	Bluetongue Stadium, Gosford
Sunday 17:00 EDT	Simon 42'; Kwasnik 71'	Report; Summary	Djulbic 45'; Pantelidis 69'; Barisic 73'	Attendance: 9,732; Referee: (Australia) Matthew Gillett

24 November 2010	Newcastle Jets FC	1–1	Central Coast Mariners	EnergyAustralia Stadium, Newcastle (Note: Game was moved due to an exhibition match between Newcastle Jets FC and Los Angeles Galaxy which also resulted in the postponement of the F3 Derby.)
Wednesday 19:00 EDT	Petrovski 90+2'	Report; Summary	Simon 49'	Attendance: 7,730; Referee: (Australia) Matthew Breeze

28 November 2010	Central Coast Mariners	1–5	Brisbane Roar	Bluetongue Stadium, Gosford
Sunday 16:00 EDT	Kwasnik 50'; McBreen (yellow card) 54' (yellow-red card) 90+3'	Report; Summary	Solórzano 8', 10'; Nichols 24'; Reinaldo 87'; Wilkinson 89' (o.g.)	Attendance: 5,858; Referee: (Australia) Ryan Shepheard

4 December 2010	Central Coast Mariners	4–0	Sydney FC	Bluetongue Stadium, Gosford
Saturday 19:00 EDT	Kwasnik 1', 23'; Simon 5'; Ryall 46' (o.g.)	Report; Summary		Attendance: 7,160; Referee: (Australia) Matthew Breeze

12 December 2010	Perth Glory	1–1	Central Coast Mariners	nib Stadium, Perth
Sunday 17:00 WST	Mitchell 4'	Report; Summary	Zwaanswijk 87'	Attendance: 6,536; Referee: (Australia) Gerard Parsons

22 December 2010	Central Coast Mariners	1–0	North Queensland Fury	Bluetongue Stadium, Gosford
Wednesday 19:30 EDT	Kwasnik 28'	Report; Summary		Attendance: 5,979; Referee: (Australia) Ryan Shepheard

26 December 2010	Central Coast Mariners	2–0	Adelaide United	Bluetongue Stadium, Gosford
Sunday 17:00 EDT	Simon 50' van Dijk 78' (o.g.)	Report; Summary		Attendance: 6,249; Referee: (Australia) Ryan Shepheard

31 December 2010	Central Coast Mariners	1–2	Melbourne Victory FC	Bluetongue Stadium, Gosford
Friday 18:00 EDT	Leijer 48' (o.g.); Kwasnik (yellow card) 41' (yellow-red card) 53'	Report; Summary	Ferreira 85'; Brebner 87'	Attendance: 12,409; Referee: (Australia) Ben Williams

9 January 2011	Central Coast Mariners	1–0	Wellington Phoenix	Bluetongue Stadium, Gosford
Sunday 17:00 EDT	McGlinchey 41'	Report; Summary		Attendance: 6,844; Referee: (Australia) Matthew Breeze

12 January 2011	Central Coast Mariners	3–3	Brisbane Roar	Bluetongue Stadium, Gosford
Wednesday 19:30 EDT	Kwasnik 37'; Simon 47'; Pérez 74' (pen.)	Report; Summary	Paartalu 23'; Broich 65'; Susak (yellow card) 46' (yellow-red card) 74'; Meyer 79'	Attendance: 7,312; Referee: (Australia) Peter Green

16 January 2011	Newcastle Jets FC	0–2	Central Coast Mariners	EnergyAustralia Stadium, Newcastle
Sunday 17:00 EDT		Report; Summary	Simon 14'; Hutchinson 87'	Attendance: 13,463; Referee: (Australia) Chris Beath

19 January 2011	Perth Glory	1–2	Central Coast Mariners	nib Stadium, Perth
Wednesday 19:00 WST	Harnwell (red card) 29'; Howarth 38'; Pellegrino (yellow card) 58' (yellow-red card) 90+4'	Report; Summary	McBreen 22'; Simon 23'	Attendance: 6,828; Referee: (Australia) Ryan Shepheard

23 January 2011	Central Coast Mariners	2–2	Sydney FC	Bluetongue Stadium, Gosford
Sunday 17:00 EDT	Pérez 49'; Simon 57'	Report; Summary	Petratos 17', 27'	Attendance: 10,546; Referee: (Australia) Strebre Delovski

29 January 2011	Adelaide United	1–2	Central Coast Mariners	Hindmarsh Stadium, Adelaide
Saturday 19:00 CDT	T. Dodd 90+1'	Report; Summary	Pérez 11'; Rose 30'	Attendance: 12,109; Referee: (Australia) Strebre Delovski

4 February 2011	Melbourne Heart	1–1	Central Coast Mariners	AAMI Park, Melbourne
Friday 20:00 EDT	M. Thompson 49'	Report; Summary	McBreen 50'	Attendance: 3,667; Referee: (Australia) Strebre Delovski

9 February 2011	Gold Coast United FC	1–3	Central Coast Mariners	Skilled Park, Gold Coast (Note: Originally scheduled for 19 December 2010, this round 19 fixture was cancelled in the 20th minute due to the poor playing condition of the pitch. It was later replayed in week 26.)
Wednesday 20:00 EST	Smeltz 84'	Report; Summary	Ibini-Isei 13'; Amini 40'; Duke 67'	Attendance: 2,037; Referee: (Australia) Chris Beath

13 February 2011	Central Coast Mariners	1–0	Newcastle Jets FC	Bluetongue Stadium, Gosford
Sunday 17:00 EDT	Pérez 90'	Report; Summary		Attendance: 9,975; Referee: (Australia) Chris Beath

=== 2010–11 Finals series ===
19 February 2011 Major Semi-Final Leg 1	Central Coast Mariners	0–2	Brisbane Roar	Bluetongue Stadium, Gosford
Saturday 19:00 EDT		Report; Summary	Barbarouses 52'; McKay 73'	Attendance: 10,166; Referee: (Australia) Matthew Breeze

26 February 2011 Major Semi-Final Leg 2	Brisbane Roar	2–2	Central Coast Mariners	Suncorp Stadium, Brisbane
Saturday 19:00 EST	Broich 63'; Henrique 90+1'	Report; Summary	M. Smith 39' (o.g.); Bozanic 40'; Bojić (yellow card) 81' (yellow-red card) 90+3'	Attendance: 25,168; Referee: (Australia) Peter Green

5 March 2011 Preliminary Final	Central Coast Mariners	1–0	Gold Coast United FC	Bluetongue Stadium, Gosford
Saturday 19:00 EDT	Kwasnik 75'	Report; Summary		Attendance: 7,539; Referee: (Australia) Strebre Delovski

13 March 2011	Brisbane Roar	2–2 (a.e.t.)	Central Coast Mariners	Suncorp Stadium
Sunday 16:00 EST	Henrique 117'; Paartalu 120'	(4-2 pen.); Report; Summary	Kwasnik 96'; Bozanic 103'	Attendance: 50,168; Referee: Matthew Breeze
	Penalties
	Franjic (penalty scored); Paartalu (penalty scored); McKay (penalty scored); Henrique (penalty scored)		(penalty scored) Hutchinson; (penalty scored) Wilkinson; (penalty missed) McBreen; (penalty missed) Bojić

== Players ==
=== First team squad ===
Note: Flags indicate national team as defined under FIFA eligibility rules; some limited exceptions apply. Players may hold more than one non-FIFA nationality.

No.	Pos.	Nation	Player
1	GK	AUS	Jess Vanstrattan
2	FW	AUS	Daniel McBreen
3	DF	AUS	Joshua Rose
4	DF	AUS	Predrag Bojić
5	MF	AUS	Brad Porter
6	DF	NED	Patrick Zwaanswijk
7	MF	MLT	John Hutchinson (Vice-Captain)
8	MF	AUS	Rostyn Griffiths
9	FW	AUS	Nik Mrdja
10	MF	ARG	Patricio Pérez
11	MF	AUS	Oliver Bozanic
12	MF	AUS	Matthew Lewis (Youth)

No.	Pos.	Nation	Player
14	MF	NZL	Michael McGlinchey
15	DF	AUS	Marc Warren (Youth)
16	DF	AUS	Trent Sainsbury (Youth)
17	DF	SCO	Chris Doig
18	DF	AUS	Alex Wilkinson (Captain)
19	FW	AUS	Matty Simon
20	GK	AUS	Mathew Ryan (Youth)
21	DF	AUS	Sam Gallagher (Youth)
22	MF	AUS	Mustafa Amini (Youth)
23	FW	AUS	Adam Kwasnik
30	GK	AUS	Paul Henderson (Injury replacement player)

=== Transfers ===
==== In ====
- (Australia) Sam Gallagher from (Australia) Sydney FC
- (Australia) Daniel McBreen from (Australia) Perth Glory
- (Australia) Nik Mrdja from (Australia) Melbourne Victory FC
- (Australia) Rostyn Griffiths from (Australia) North Queensland Fury
- (Australia) Joshua Rose from (Romania) Universitatea Craiova
- (Australia) Oliver Bozanic from (England) Reading F.C.
- (Australia) Jess Vanstrattan from (Australia) Gold Coast United FC
- (New Zealand) Michael McGlinchey from (Scotland) Motherwell F.C. (loan return)
- (Argentina) Patricio Pérez from (Argentina) Defensa y Justicia
- (Netherlands) Patrick Zwaanswijk from (Netherlands) NAC Breda

==== Out ====
- (Australia) Shane Huke to (England) Rushden & Diamonds
- (Australia) Andrew Redmayne to (Australia) Brisbane Roar
- (Australia) Danny Vukovic to (Turkey) Konyaspor
- (Australia) Dylan Macallister to (New Zealand) Wellington Phoenix FC
- (Australia) Nigel Boogaard to (Australia) Adelaide United
- (Australia) Panni Nikas to (Australia) North Queensland Fury
- (Australia) Andrew Clark Retired
- (Wales) Matt Crowell
- (England) Nicky Travis
- (Australia) Ahmad Elrich

== Squad statistics ==
No.	Pos	Nat	Player	Total		A League		Finals	
No.	Pos	Nat	Player	Apps	Goals	Apps	Goals	Apps	Goals
1	GK	(Australia) AUS	Jess Vanstrattan	3	0	3+0	0	0+0	0
2	FW	(Australia) AUS	Daniel McBreen	31	5	20+7	5	3+1	0
3	DF	(Australia) AUS	Joshua Rose	31	3	27+0	3	4+0	0
4	DF	(Australia) AUS	Pedj Bojić	27	0	23+1	0	3+0	0
5	DF	(Australia) AUS	Brad Porter	6	0	3+3	0	0+0	0
6	DF	(Netherlands) NED	Patrick Zwaanswijk	33	3	29+0	3	4+0	0
7	MF	(Malta) MLT	John Hutchinson	26	1	14+9	1	1+2	0
8	MF	(Australia) AUS	Rostyn Griffiths	30	2	24+2	2	3+1	0
9	FW	(Australia) AUS	Nik Mrdja	6	0	0+6	0	0+0	0
10	MF	(Argentina) ARG	Patricio Pérez	18	6	12+3	6	3+0	0
11	MF	(Australia) AUS	Oliver Bozanic	33	2	29+0	0	4+0	2
12	MF	(Australia) AUS	Matthew Lewis	8	1	0+8	1	0+0	0
13	FW	(Australia) AUS	Michael Baird	3	0	0+3	0	0+0	0
14	MF	(New Zealand) NZL	Michael McGlinchey	34	1	30+0	1	4+0	0
15	DF	(Australia) AUS	Marc Warren	0	0	0+0	0	0+0	0
16	DF	(Australia) AUS	Trent Sainsbury	9	0	6+2	0	1+0	0
17	DF	(Scotland) SCO	Chris Doig	13	0	3+10	0	0+0	0
18	DF	(Australia) AUS	Alex Wilkinson	34	1	30+0	1	4+0	0
19	FW	(Australia) AUS	Matt Simon	31	11	28+0	11	2+1	0
20	GK	(Australia) AUS	Mathew Ryan	31	0	27+0	0	4+0	0
21	DF	(Australia) AUS	Sam Gallagher	0	0	0+0	0	0+0	0
22	MF	(Australia) AUS	Mustafa Amini	23	1	10+10	1	1+2	0
23	FW	(Australia) AUS	Adam Kwasnik	28	10	10+14	8	3+1	2
24	FW	(Australia) AUS	Bernie Ibini-Isei	4	1	2+0	1	0+2	0
25	FW	(Australia) AUS	Mitchell Duke	1	1	0+1	1	0+0	0
30	GK	(Australia) AUS	Paul Henderson	0	0	0+0	0	0+0	0
