= Andrea Merenda =

Italian footballer (born 1977)

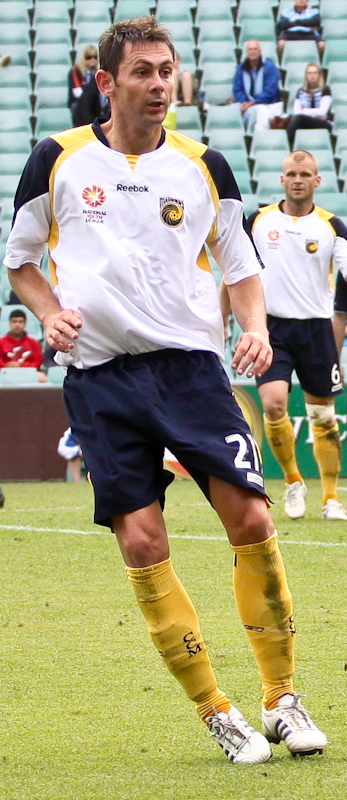
- Merenda playing for the Central Coast Mariners

Personal information
- Date of birth: 10 June 1977 (age 49)
- Place of birth: Milan, Italy
- Height: 1.81 m (5 ft 11 in)
- Position: Central midfielder

Youth career
- –1994: Pro Sesto

Senior career*
Years	Team	Apps	(Gls)
1994–1998	Pro Sesto	64	(0)
1998–2001	Gualdo	62	(0)
2001–2002	Usmate		
2002–2005	Mantova	18	(1)
2004	→ Belluno (loan)	15	(1)
2005	Casale	9	(0)
2005–2006	Poggibonsi		
2006–2007	Santarcangelo		
2007–2008	Lecco	5	(0)
2008	Central Coast Mariners	0	(0)
2008–2009	Marconi Stallions		
- * Club domestic league appearances and goals

Andrea Merenda (born 10 June 1977) is an Italian former football midfielder.

== Biography ==
Merenda had been in training with the Mariners for a month before earning his shot at the Hyundai A-League, having most recently completed the 2007–08 Italian Serie C1 campaign with Lecco, an historic club from the north of Italy once coached by Roberto Donadoni.

Born in Milan, Merenda came to Australia seeking a fresh challenge after 16 seasons in his home country that included stints at nine clubs across various divisions – peaking with six seasons in the third-tier Serie C1, a division that once pitted Merenda against current Qantas Socceroo Carl Valeri.

Equally at home in defence or midfield, Merenda was introduced to the yellow and navy set up as short-term cover for injured attacking ace Ahmad Elrich. Merenda's signing, albeit on a short-term basis, was a significant one for the Mariners, who until his capture had yet to engage the services of a foreign player from abroad. He was released after failing to break into the first team.
