= Matthew Osman =

Australian soccer player

Personal information
- Full name: Matthew James Osman
- Date of birth: 29 July 1983 (age 43)
- Place of birth: Sydney, Australia
- Height: 1.83 m (6 ft 0 in)
- Position: Midfielder

Team information
- Current team: Parramatta Eagles

Senior career*
Years	Team	Apps	(Gls)
2002–2003	Northern Spirit	12	(0)
2003	Manly United	4	(0)
2003–2004	Northern Spirit	15	(1)
2004–2005	Penrith United	15	(2)
2005–2009	Central Coast Mariners	58	(3)
2009–2011	Gold Coast United	15	(0)
2011	Parramatta Eagles		
2012–	Lions FC		

International career
2002	Australia U20	3	(0)
Medal record
Representing Australia
Men's Association football
OFC U-20 Championship
Winner	2002 Fiji/Vanuatu
- * Club domestic league appearances and goals

Matthew James Osman (born 29 July 1983) is an Australian former professional footballer who played as a midfielder.

== Club career ==
On 12 October 2007, Osman was injured during training and as a result he sat out the remainder of the 2007–08 A-League season. He was forced to have an anterior cruciate ligament reconstruction, returning to training in May 2008. In July 2008 he re-signed with the Mariners for the 2008–09 season.

Osman appeared in a Season 5 episode of the U.S. TV series The Office. A photo appears of two players, taken from an A-League (soccer) game between Central Coast Mariners and Perth Glory, played at Central Coast Stadium in Gosford, Australia, on 31 December 2008. The players in the photo (taken by Corey Davis of Getty Images) are Marc Anthony (Perth) and Osman (Central Coast).

On 3 December 2008, Osman was signed by Gold Coast United for their inaugural A-league season. He signed for Parramatta Eagles in summer of 2011.

== International career ==
Osman was named in the Australia under-20 team squad for the 2002 OFC U-20 Championship in Fiji.

== Honours ==
Central Coast Mariners

- A-League Premiership: 2007–08
- A-League Pre-Season Challenge Cup: 2005

Australia U-20

- OFC U-19 Men's Championship: 2002

== See also ==
- List of Central Coast Mariners FC players
- List of Gold Coast United FC players
