= Nicky Travis =

English footballer

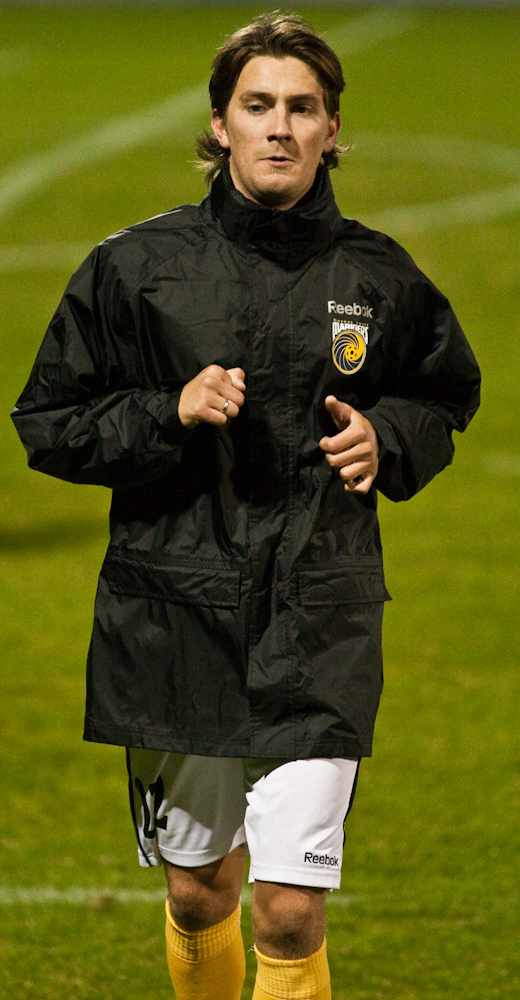

Personal information
- Date of birth: 12 March 1987 (age 39)
- Place of birth: Sheffield, England
- Position: Attacking midfielder

Youth career
- –2007: Sheffield United

Senior career*
Years	Team	Apps	(Gls)
2007–2009	Sheffield United	3	(0)
	→ Chesterfield (loan)	2	(0)
2009–2014	Central Coast Mariners	112	(21)
2014–	ASD Siracusa	38	
- * Club domestic league appearances and goals as of 12:06, 13 June 2009 (UTC)

Nicolas Vaughan Travis (born 12 March 1988) is an English football player and coach.

== Career ==
Born in Sheffield, South Yorkshire, Travis was signed by Chesterfield on loan in August 2007 until 31 December. He returned to Sheffield United in October, after suffering knee and ankle injuries.

In May 2009, with his contract about to expire, he agreed a free transfer to Australian A-League side Central Coast Mariners following a successful trial. He scored his first goal for the Mariners in a match against league leaders Gold Coast United in a 3–0 win. Nicky Returned to Europe playing with A.S.D Siracusa (Italy)
