= Brady Smith (soccer) =

Australian soccer player

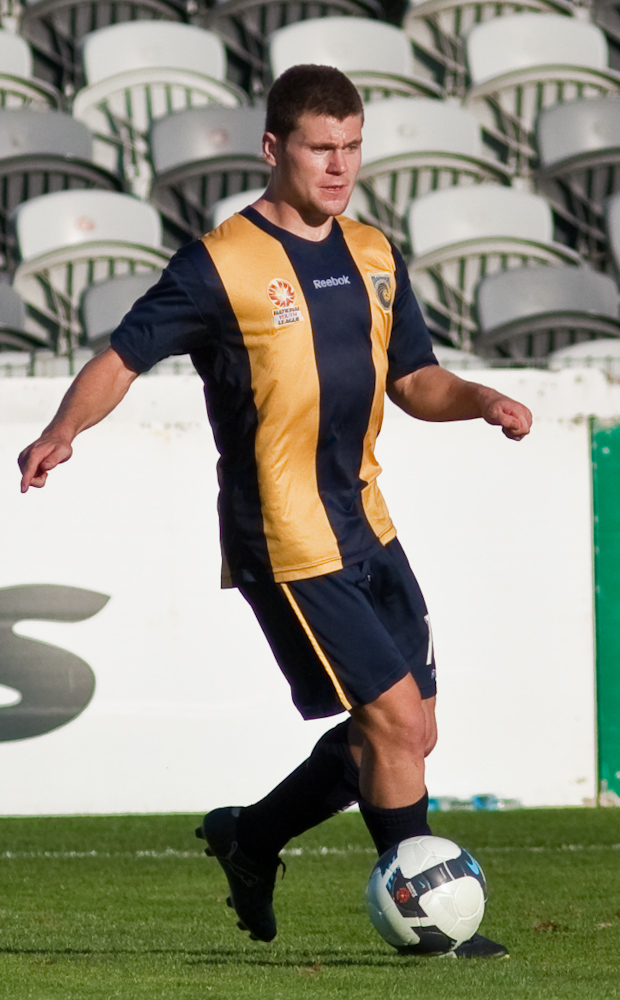
- Smith playing for Central Coast Mariners in 2010

Personal information
- Full name: Brady Patrick Smith
- Date of birth: 10 August 1989 (age 37)
- Place of birth: Gosford, New South Wales, Australia
- Height: 1.80 m (5 ft 11 in)
- Position: Striker

Youth career
- Wyoming FC
- 2008–2011: Central Coast Mariners

Senior career*
Years	Team	Apps	(Gls)
2008	Central Coast Lightning		
2008–2010	Central Coast Mariners	2	(0)
2011	Spirit FC		
2013	Central Coast Mariners Academy	16	(0)
- * Club domestic league appearances and goals as of 21:21, 9 February 2010 (UTC)

Brady Smith (born 10 August 1989 in Gosford, New South Wales) is an Australian footballer who played for the Central Coast Mariners.

== Club career ==
Smith made his debut for the Mariners in a 3–0 victory over Newcastle Jets in Round 26 of the 2009-10 A-League season at Bluetongue Stadium on 8 February 2010, after the game was postponed from 6 February due to a waterlogged pitch. He was a 69th-minute substitute for another Mariners youngster, and captain of the Mariners National Youth League team, Panny Nikas (who was making his first senior start). Smith came up with an assist for Matt Simon's 72nd-minute goal. He has also featured against Wellington Phoenix last season.
