= Nathan Sherlock =

Australian soccer player

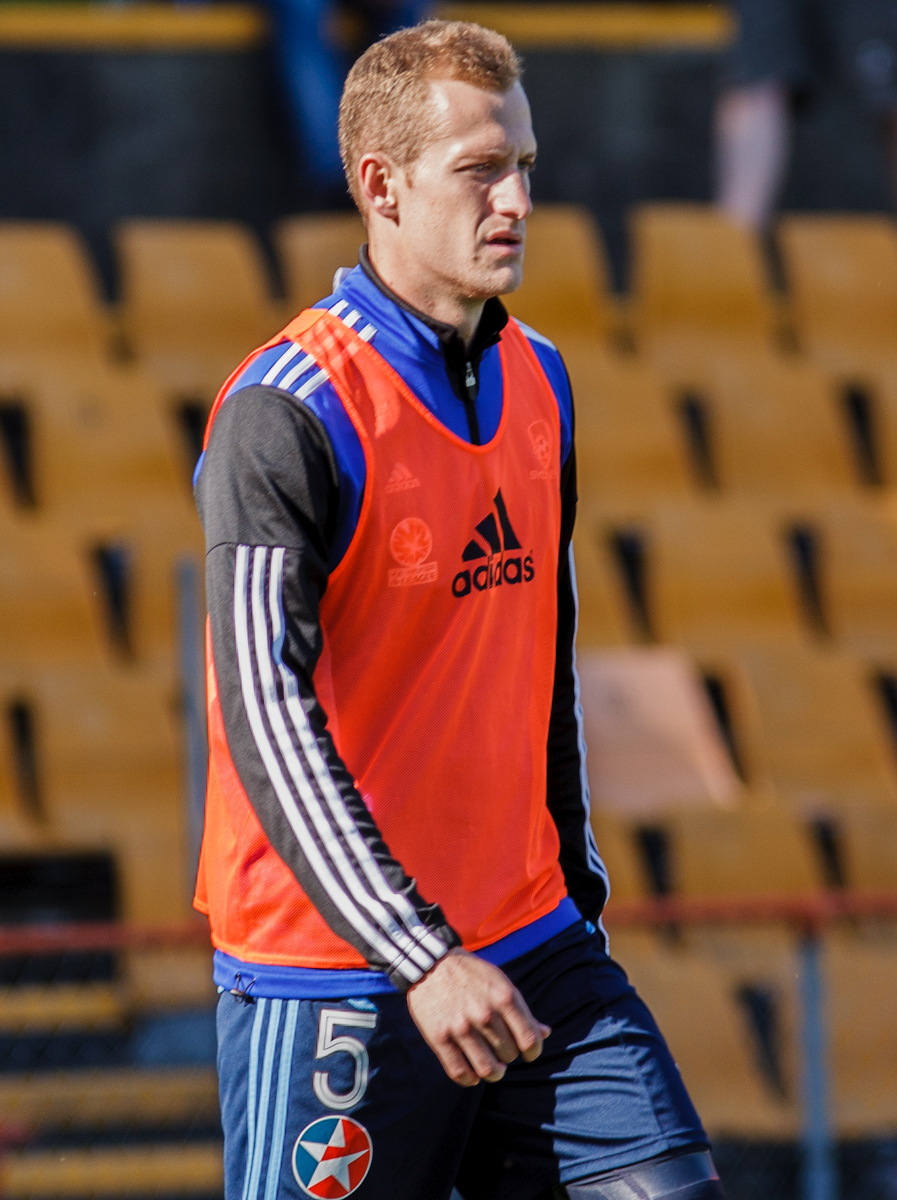

Personal information
- Full name: Nathan Sherlock
- Date of birth: 2 February 1990 (age 36)
- Place of birth: Orange, New South Wales, Australia
- Height: 1.81 m (5 ft 11 1/2 in)
- Position: Defender

Youth career
- 2008–2010: Central Coast Mariners
- 2010–2011: Sydney FC

Senior career*
Years	Team	Apps	(Gls)
2007–2008	Sydney Olympic		
2009	Central Coast Mariners	0	(0)
2010	West Sydney Berries		
2011–2013	Sydney FC	8	(0)
2013–2017	Sydney United 58	58	(0)
2018	GHFA Spirit FC	2	(0)

International career^{‡}
- Australia U17

Managerial career
- 2018–2019: GHFA Spirit FC (Assistant coach)
- 2019–2022: Brisbane Roar FC (Strength and Conditioning)
- 2026–: Auckland FC (Head of performance)
- * Club domestic league appearances and goals as of 19 June 2022 ‡ National team caps and goals as of 17:30, 4 December 2011 (UTC)

Nathan Sherlock (born 2 February 1990) is a former Australian soccer player.

== Career ==
Having plied his trade in the NSW State leagues with the likes of Sydney Olympic and West Sydney Berries Sherlock has also spent time with the Central Coast Mariners however failed to make a senior appearance, despite making several match day squads and their Asian Champions League list.

=== Sydney FC ===
On 18 May 2011 he signed a professional contract A-League club Sydney FC. Sherlock was called up to the senior Sydney FC squad for their 2011 Asian Champions League campaign, however did not feature in any matches, despite traveling with the team to Japan for a game. He made his debut for the club during the community round of the 2011-12 A-League season during their 1-1 draw with Perth Glory at Campbelltown Stadium. However, as a result of Sydney FC failing to qualify for the A-League finals, Sherlock, along with teammates Paul Reid, Krunoslav Lovrek, Trent McClenahan, Adam Griffiths and Jarrod Kyle were released by Sydney FC at the conclusion of the 2012-13 A-League season.

He subsequently joined Sydney United in the NSW Premier League where he won the championship under Mark Rudan in 2013.

== Honours ==
With Sydney United:

- (Australia) Waratah Cup: 2015, 2016
