= Dean Heffernan =

Australian soccer player

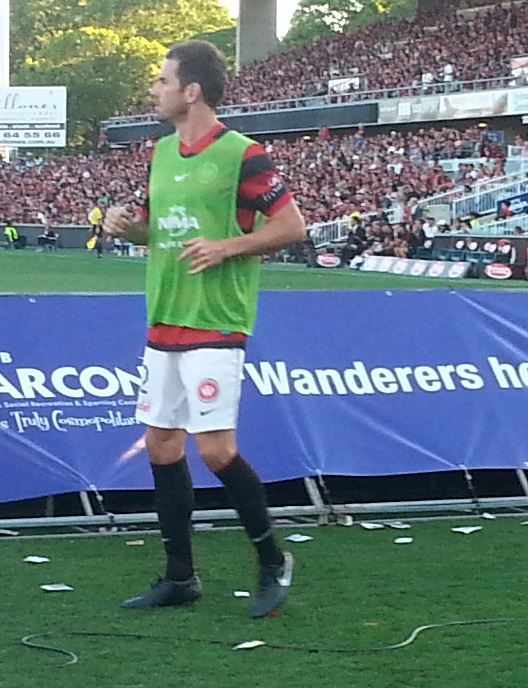
- Heffernan warming up for the Western Sydney Wanderers in 2013

Personal information
- Full name: Dean James Heffernan
- Date of birth: 19 May 1980 (age 46)
- Place of birth: Sydney, New South Wales, Australia
- Height: 1.86 m (6 ft 1 in)
- Position: Left back

Team information
- Current team: Central Coast Mariners Women (head coach)

Youth career
- Sutherland Sharks

Senior career*
Years	Team	Apps	(Gls)
2002–2003	Wollongong Wolves	20	(1)
2003–2004	Sydney United	18	(1)
2004–2005	Sutherland Sharks	12	(5)
2005–2010	Central Coast Mariners	65	(10)
2006–2007	→ 1. FC Nürnberg (loan)	0	(0)
2010	Huddersfield Town	15	(0)
2010–2011	Melbourne Heart	13	(0)
2011	Liaoning Whowin	24	(0)
2011–2013	Perth Glory	34	(1)
2013–2014	Western Sydney Wanderers	9	(0)
2015	Bankstown City	19	(4)
2016	Maitland FC	15	(2)
2018	Central Coast United	5	(0)
Total		249	(25)

International career
2009–2010	Australia	2	(1)

Managerial career
- 2019–2021: Western Sydney Wanderers Women
- 2023–2026: Central Coast United
- 2026–: Central Coast Mariners Women
- * Club domestic league appearances and goals

Dean James Heffernan (born 19 May 1980) is an Australian former professional soccer player and coach. As a player, he appeared for clubs in Australia, Germany, England, Malaysia and China. He began his career in the Australian National Soccer League with Wollongong Wolves and Sydney United, He played in the A‑League most notably with the Central Coast Mariners, where he earned selection in multiple team‑of‑the‑year honours and contributed to two premiership‑winning campaigns. Heffernan also spent time in Germany, England, Malaysia, and China, making 15 league appearances for Huddersfield Town in 2010 and featuring for Liaoning Whowin in the Chinese Super League. At international level, he played twice for Australia in 2009 and 2010, scoring once in Asian Cup qualifying. After retiring from playing in 2018, Heffernan moved into coaching, serving as head coach of the Western Sydney Wanderers in the W‑League from 2019 to 2021 and later taking charge of Central Coast United in 2023.

== Club career ==
With the Central Coast Mariners he scored 8 goals from left back in 24 games and was subsequently named in Australian FourFourTwo's A-League dream team. In March 2006, he and teammate Michael Beauchamp had a ten-day trial with German Bundesliga club Nürnberg. On 1 July 2006, both players transferred to Nürnberg on season-long loans. Heffernan struggled to get senior games only appearing on the bench for the first team, although he played eight games in the reserves scoring five goals.

Heffernan suffered a broken leg during the Mariners 4–5 loss to Sydney FC on 22 December 2007, due to a tackle by Ufuk Talay. As a result, he was unable to play in the rest of the 2007–08 A-League season. Since returning from fracturing his tibia, he was selected twice for the Socceroos and was a stand out for his club the Mariners in their 2010 Asian Champions League campaign.

With the Central Coast Mariners in the 2009–10 he had another stand out season, where he was named in the PFA team of the year and Australian Four Four Two team of the year. He also scored his first international goal for Australia against Kuwait. On 26 November 2009, Heffernan joined new A-league side, Melbourne Heart on a multi-year deal.

=== Huddersfield Town ===
Prior to joining Melbourne Heart, Heffernan joined English side Huddersfield Town in Football League One to help prepare for a World Cup call up for the Socceroos. He completed the deal on 28 January 2010 after receiving his international clearance. On 30 January 2010, he made his debut for the Terriers in their 1–0 win against Yeovil Town at Huish Park. His first home game for Huddersfield was in their 1–1 draw with Carlisle United. Heffernan's last game for the Terriers was in their 4–3 win over Walsall. After Town lost in the play-offs, Heffernan returned to Australia to join his new teammates at Melbourne Heart after making 15 appearances for the Terriers.

=== Melbourne Heart ===
At Heart, he played most games in the first half of the season, but after getting sent off, his position was covered by Aziz Behich and he was not included in the starting lineup for many games afterwards.

=== Perth Glory ===
On 25 February 2011, Heffernan moved to A-League side Perth Glory for the 2011–12 season. He planned to join Perth Glory for pre-season training in August after he had completed a short-term loan deal with Chinese Super League club Liaoning Whowin.

=== Liaoning Whowin ===
On 30 August 2011, it was announced Perth Glory had agreed to release Heffernan after the player decided he would like to remain with Liaoning Whowin after the end of his loan deal.

=== Return to Perth Glory ===
On 3 January 2012 it was announced that he had returned to A-League club Perth Glory.

=== Western Sydney Wanderers ===
On 28 June 2013, it was announced that Heffernan had signed a one-year contract to play for Western Sydney Wanderers, following a short stint with Illawarra Premier League club Dapto Dandaloo Fury.

== Managerial career ==
On 24 April 2019 Heffernan was appointed the manager of the Western Sydney Wanderers in the W-league. On 12 April 2023 Heffernan was appointed the manager of the Central Coast United FC in the NSW League One.

In August 2026, Heffernan was appointed coach of Central Coast Mariners Women.

== Career statistics ==
Club	Season	A-League		Finals		Asia		Other^{1}		Total	
Club	Season	Apps	Goals	Apps	Goals	Apps	Goals	Apps	Goals	Apps	Goals
Central Coast Mariners	2005–06	19	7	4	1	-	-	5	0	28	8
Club	Season	Bundesliga		DFB-Pokal		Europe		Other		Total	
1. FC Nürnberg (loan)	2006–07	0	0	-	-	-	-	-	-	0	0
Club	Season	A-League		Finals		Asia		Other^{1}		Total	
Central Coast Mariners	2007–08	16	1	-	-	-	-	3	0	19	1
Central Coast Mariners	2008–09	6	0	1	0	6	0	1	0	14	0
Central Coast Mariners	2009–10	20	1	-	-	-	-	-	-	20	1
Central Coast Mariners	Club subtotal	61	9	5	1	6	0	9	0	81	10
Club	Season	League One		FA Cup		Europe		Other		Total	
Huddersfield Town	2009–10	15	0	-	-	-	-	-	-	15	0
Club	Season	A-League		Finals		Asia		Other		Total	
Melbourne Heart	2010–11	13	0	-	-	-	-	-	-	13	0
Club	Season	Chinese Super League		Chinese FA Cup		Asia		Other		Total	
Liaoning Whowin (loan)	2011	22	0	-	-	-	-	-	-	22	0
Club	Season	A-League		Finals		Asia		Other		Total	
Perth Glory	2011–12	14	1	-	-	-	-	-	-	14	1
Total		128	10	5	1	6	0	9	0	145	11

^{1}Includes A-League Pre-Season Challenge Cup.

== International career ==
Heffernan was selected to be part of the Socceroos in the Australia versus Argentina game on 11 September 2007. He got his first senior international cap on 28 January 2009 in an AFC Asian Cup qualifying match versus Indonesia at the Bung Karno Stadium in Jakarta. He was then again selected for the Socceroos in January 2010 in an AFC Asian Cup qualifying match versus Kuwait. Heffernan scored in the fifth minute to open his international scoring account and help his side to a 2–2 draw.

International goals
Goal	Date	Venue	Opponent	Score	Result	Competition
1	6 January 2010	Al Kuwait Sports Club Stadium, Al Kuwayt, Kuwait	Kuwait	2–0	2–2	2011 AFC Asian Cup qualification

International appearances
#	Date	Opponent	Score	Result	Competition	Game time	Match Report
1	29 January 2009	Indonesia	0–0	Draw	2011 AFC Asian Cup qualification	(substituted off) 76'	Report
2	6 January 2010	Kuwait	2–2	Draw	2011 AFC Asian Cup qualification	Full game	Report

== Honours ==
Central Coast Mariners

- A-League Premiership: 2007–08
