= Matthew Lewis (footballer) =

Australian soccer player

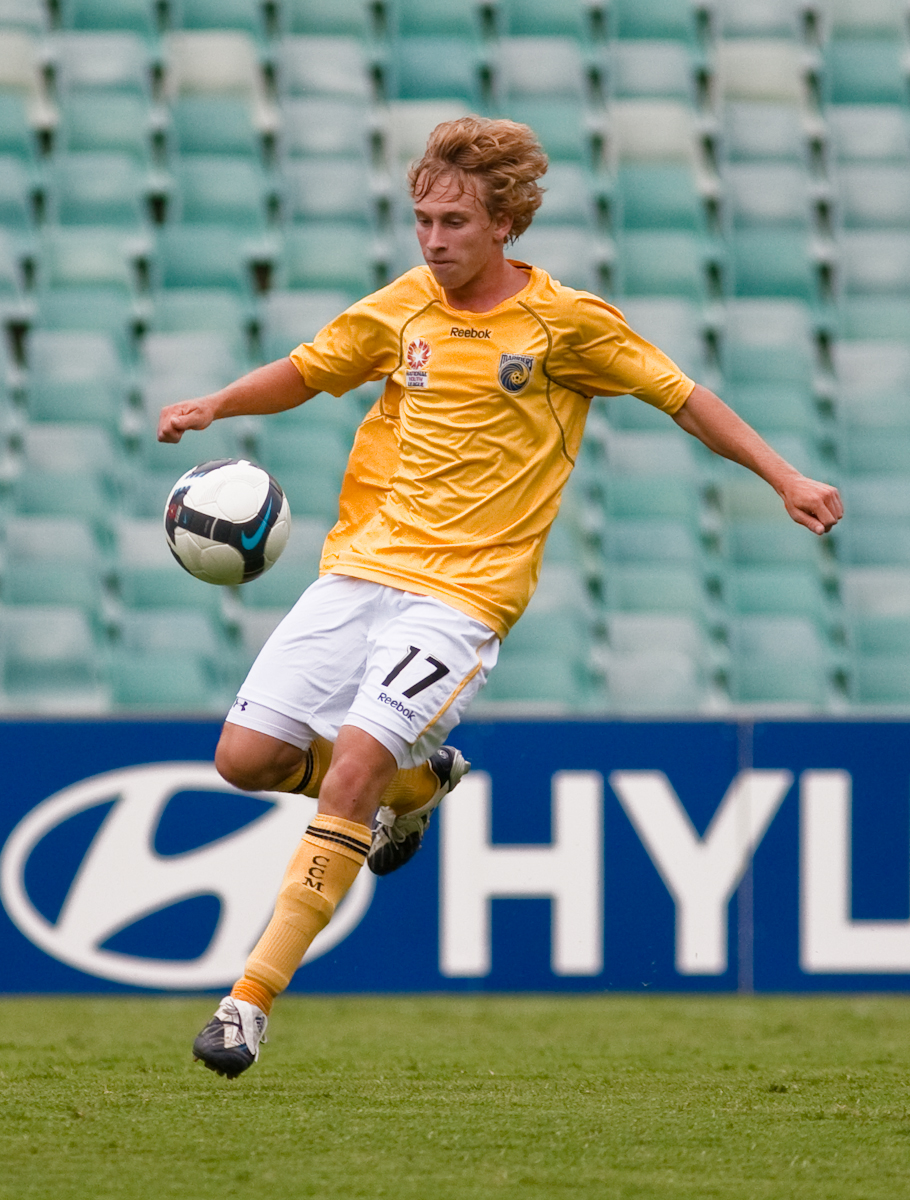

Personal information
- Date of birth: 6 June 1990 (age 36)
- Place of birth: Sydney, Australia
- Height: 1.73 m (5 ft 8 in)
- Position: Left winger

Youth career
- 2008–2009: Central Coast Mariners

Senior career*
Years	Team	Apps	(Gls)
2008	Blacktown City	14	(1)
2009–2011	Central Coast Mariners	15	(1)
2009	→ Blacktown City (loan)	9	(3)
2011–	Blacktown City	284	(24)
- * Club domestic league appearances and goals as of 28 September 2023

Matthew Lewis (born 6 June 1990) is an Australian former professional footballer who last played for Blacktown City in the National Premier Leagues NSW. Considered a club legend, Lewis has made over 300 official appearances as a defender for the Demons.

== Career ==
=== Central Coast Mariners ===
On 25 January 2009 Lewis made his debut for the Central Coast Mariners against Adelaide United at Bluetongue Stadium, Gosford.

On 15 September 2010, Lewis competed in a 100-metre race alongside the likes of Jarryd Hayne, Greg Inglis, Nathan Gardner, Josh Morris, Ben Barba, Lachie Turner and Courtenay Dempsey to find the fastest football player in Australia.

=== Blacktown City ===
Since rejoining his boyhood club Blacktown City in 2011, Lewis made his 305th appearance for the club in a league match against Marconi Stallions on 28 August 2020. He broke the record for the most appearances made for Blacktown, surpassing Damien Foxe who made 304 appearances. After 376 appearances in total, Lewis announced his retirement on 16 August 2023, having won three National Premier Leagues NSW Championships, one Premiership, and a National Premier Leagues Grand Final in 2015. He played his last match on 20 August against Wollongong Wolves at Landen Stadium.
