= Central Coast United FC =

- Full name: Central Coast United Football Club
- Nicknames: CCU, The Pirates
- Founded: 2017
- Ground: Pluim Park, Lisarow
- Capacity: 2,200
- Technical Directors: Stuart Davis; Matt Crowell
- Coach: Shannon Cole
- League: NSW League Two
- 2025: 15th of 15
- Website: https://www.ccutd.com/

Central Coast United FC, is a semi-professional soccer club, based and located on the Central Coast of New South Wales. For the 2024 season, the club's senior teams will compete in the NSW League Two competitions and the clubs youth team will compete in NSW League Three competitions.

== Senior team history ==
In 2017, the club applied and was granted a licence to compete under from the start of the 2018 season.

In both the 2018 and 2019 season, Club Captain Daniel McFarlane won NSW State League Player of the Year.

In the club's first season they lost out on promotion by a single point, an achievement in their first season. The club later secured the Grand Final Championship with a victory over Bankstown United. The 2019 season saw Central Coast United again be successful as in July 2019, the club secured promotion to National Premier Leagues NSW 3 with a 3–1 victory over Prospect United in their 2nd ever season. The 2019 season for Central Coast United was declared the most successful Central Coast side due to the Under 15s, 16s, 18s, 20s and the 1st Team all winners of the league.

The 2022 season saw even more success for the club as it gained promotion to the NSW League One competition after a 1–1 draw with Canterbury Bankstown on 16 July 2022. However, the club only lasted a solitary season in League One, being relegated in 2023 back to NSW League Two, finishing 10 points off second last placed Mounties Wanderers FC.

=== Association with Central Coast Mariners ===
In 2023, Central Coast Mariners and Central Coast United renewed their relationship as the official feeder club to Central Coast Mariners.

== Club Honours ==
- NSW League Two Premiership
  - Runners-up: 2022
  NSW State League/NSW League Three Club Championship
  - Winners: 2019
  NSW State League/NSW League Three Premiership
  - Winners: 2019
  - Runners-up: 2018
  NSW State League/NSW League Three Championship
  - Winners: 2018
  - Runners-up: 2019

== Head-to-head records ==
=== NPL Teams ===
Opponent	Played	Won	Drawn	Lost	Win %
Bankstown City	6	2	2	2	33
Bankstown United	8	4	1	3	50
Blacktown Spartans	1	0	0	1	0
Bonnyrigg White Eagles	1	0	0	1	0
Canterbury Bankstown	5	0	4	1	0
Dulwich Hill	5	3	0	2	60
Dunbar Rovers	6	2	1	3	33
Fraser Park	4	1	0	3	25
Gladesville Ryde Magic	4	2	2	0	50
Hills United	2	0	0	2	0
Hurstville ZFC	4	4	0	0	100
Inner West Hawks	5	3	1	1	60
Inter Lions	4	3	0	1	75
Macarthur Rams	6	2	1	3	33
Maccabi Hakoah	1	0	0	1	0
Marconi Stallions	1	0	0	1	0
Mounties Wanderers	1	0	1	0	0
Nepean FC	5	3	1	1	60
Northern Tigers	1	0	0	1	0
Prospect United	4	2	1	1	50
Rydalmere Lions	5	1	0	4	20
South Coast Flame	4	4	0	0	100
Sydney University	6	3	2	1	50
University of NSW	5	5	0	0	100

- Includes NPL Matches and Australia Cup Matches

=== Non NPL Teams ===
Opponent	Played	Won	Drawn	Lost	Win %
Balmain Tigers	4	4	0	0	100
Gazy Auburn	4	4	0	0	100
Hazelbrook FC	1	0	0	1	0
Hurstville City Minotaurs	5	5	0	0	100
Scots FC	1	1	0	0	100
Wagga City Wanderers	2	2	0	0	100
Waratahs	2	2	0	0	100
Western Condors	4	2	1	1	50
Wollongong United	1	0	0	1	0
Wyoming FC	1	1	0	0	100

== Club colours ==
The club colours are black and gold with white. The club's home kit was revealed in February 2022, the club will play in gold with black trim. The away kit has been confirmed as a white kit with gold pinstripes. The logo which is inspired by the skull and crossbones was designed by designer Matthew Wolff who has designed LAFC and NYCFC logo's as well as the high-selling Nigeria 2018 World Cup kit.

== Seasons ==
=== League ===
Season	League										Aus. Cup	Waratah Cup	Top goalscorer(s)	
Season	Division	P	W	D	L	GF	GA	Pts	Pos	Finals	Aus. Cup	Waratah Cup	Player(s)	Goals
2018	NSW State League (5)	22	18	3	1	85	17	57	2nd	W	PR6	R5	Daniel McFarlane	20
2019	NSW State League (5)	20	15	0	5	62	25	45	1st ↑	RU	PR3	R2	?	?
2020	NPL3 (4)	11	2	4	5	23	18	10	9th	—	— (Note: Australia and Waratah Cups cancelled due to Covid–19)	—	Alexander Arbelo	5
2021 (Note: Season cancelled midseason due to Covid–19)	NPL3 (4)	16	6	5	5	30	26	23	6th	—	PR4	R3	Joshua Swadling	9
2022	League Two (4)	22	13	4	5	49	34	43	2nd ↑	SF	PR4	R3	Daniel McFarlane	15
2023	League One (3)	30	4	5	21	37	81	17	7th	N/A	Entered	Entered	Adam Woodbine	8

=== Cup ===
Season	Cup	Round	Home team (tier)	Score	Away team (tier)	Notes
2018	FFA Cup Qualifiers	Preliminary R2	Central Coast United (5)	–	Bye	
2018	FFA Cup Qualifiers	Preliminary R3	Central Coast United (5)	2–0	Wyoming FC (-)	
2018	FFA Cup Qualifiers	Preliminary R4	Sydney University (4)	0–4	Central Coast United (5)	
2018	FFA Cup Qualifiers	Preliminary R5	Hurstville City Minotaurs (5)	1–2	Central Coast United (5)	
2018	FFA Cup Qualifiers	Preliminary R6	Hills Brumbies (3)	3–1	Central Coast United (5)	
2019	FFA Cup Qualifiers	Preliminary R3	Hazelbrook FC (6)	2–1	Central Coast United (5)	
2020	FFA Cup Qualifiers	Cancelled due to the COVID-19 pandemic in Australia.				
2021	FFA Cup Qualifiers	Preliminary R3	Scots FC (6)	2–6	Central Coast United (4)	
2021	FFA Cup Qualifiers	Preliminary R4	Central Coast United (4)	0–3	Marconi Stallions (2)	
2022	Australia Cup Qualifiers	Preliminary R3	Waratahs FC (-)	2–2†	Central Coast United (4)	Central Coast United advance 3–1 on penalties
2022	Australia Cup Qualifiers	Preliminary R4	Wollongong United (6)	3–0	Central Coast United (4)	
2023	Australia Cup Qualifiers	Preliminary R3	Orange Waratah (-)	1–5	Central Coast United (3)	
2023	Australia Cup Qualifiers	Preliminary R4	Central Coast United (3)	4–1	Brighton Heat (-)	
2023	Australia Cup Qualifiers	Preliminary R5	Central Coast United (3)	2–4	Blacktown Spartans (3)	
2024	Australia Cup Qualifiers	Preliminary R3	Central Coast United (4)	2–1	Bankstown United (4)	

== Current squad ==
As of 15 February 2024

Note: Flags indicate national team as defined under FIFA eligibility rules; some limited exceptions apply. Players may hold more than one non-FIFA nationality.

No.	Pos.	Nation	Player
1	GK	AUS	Zayd Husain
2	DF	AUS	Michael Singh
3	DF	AUS	Connor Gallen
4	DF	AUS	Ben Waller
5	DF	AUS	Mark Partridge
6	DF	AUS	Geordie Howe
7	MF	SCO	Daniel McFarlane
8	MF	JPN	Yuki Morikawa
9	FW	COK	Cade Mapu
10	DF	AUS	Jack Ragen
11	MF	AUS	Bret Sibanda

No.	Pos.	Nation	Player
12	MF	AUS	Cayleb Murray
14	FW	AUS	Euan McEvoy-Folland
15	FW	AUS	Ben Flakus
17	DF	AUS	Jai McNamara
18	MF	ENG	Barney Irvine-Rundle
20	MF	URU	Alexander Arbelo
22	DF	ENG	Matthew Ingham
23	FW	AUS	Jarred Steen
31	GK	AUS	Steven Grimmett
66	FW	AUS	Jack Barr
99	FW	AUS	Zac Pezzutto

== Club Officials ==
Position	Name
Head coach	(Australia) Shannon Cole
Assistant coach	(Australia) Peter Edwards
Assistant coach	(Australia) Nathanael Lees-Kent

== Notable former players ==
In its former role as the main feeder club for the Central Coast Mariners, many players have progressed to careers in the A-League. Notable former players include:

- Damien Brown
- Matt Crowell
- Dean Heffernan
- Mitchell Prentice
- Bradley Porter
- Matt Simon
- Matthew Trott
