= Brad Porter =

Australian soccer player and coach

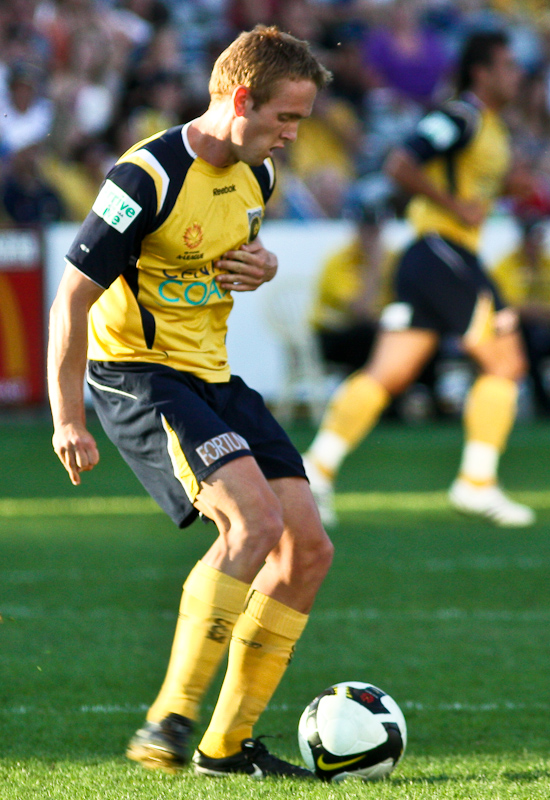
- Porter playing for Central Coast Mariners in 2008

Personal information
- Full name: Bradley Stephen Porter
- Date of birth: 19 February 1987 (age 39)
- Place of birth: Gosford, Australia
- Height: 1.80 m (5 ft 11 in)
- Position: Central midfielder

Team information
- Current team: Central Coast United

Youth career
- Kanwal Warnervale
- Killarney District SC
- 2004–2005: AIS /Table Tennis

Senior career*
Years	Team	Apps	(Gls)
2006–2012	Central Coast Mariners	74	(0)
2007–2008	→ Central Coast Lightning (loan)	9	(0)
2021–	Central Coast United	2	(0)

International career^{‡}
2006	Australia U-20	7	(0)
- * Club domestic league appearances and goals as of 10 November 2021 ‡ National team caps and goals as of 17:30, 31 October 2010 (UTC)

Bradley Porter (born 19 February 1987) is a retired Australian soccer player, who played for the Central Coast Mariners.

== Club career ==
Porter first came to the Mariners late in the 2005–06 A-League season for a four-week stay as cover for the crippling injury toll that the team experienced, but had a season-ending injury himself days prior to debuting.

Signed again for the 2006–07 campaign, the youngster did not get more than a handful of substitute appearances in the first 2/3 of the season as the Mariners defense was having another great year. However, as the season wound down, the Mariners lost key players at crucial times and scorers lost form. Brad received several starts at the latter end of the season, against quality opposition such as Melbourne Victory FC and Adelaide United FC, because of this and impressed many of the other players with his versatility, strength and skill. For the 2007–08 A-league season, Mariners' coach Lawrie McKinna made it clear the Mariners would hold onto this quality talent, and that he would be a major part of the campaign, hopefully filling the place vacated by Noel Spencer. In 2010/11, a serious knee injury kept Porter sidelined for the whole season.

On 14 October 2007 Porter was sent off after receiving a red card for a sliding tackle. Porter played with the Mariners feeder club and NSW Super League side Central Coast Lightning. On 11 July 2012, Porter announced his retirement due to his inability to overcome long term injury problems.

== Post-football career ==
In 2013, Porter joined the coaching staff at the International Football School in Kariong, New South Wales and took on a First Grade coaching role for Central Coast Premier League team Kanwal Warnervale Rovers

== Honours ==
With Central Coast Mariners:

- (Australia) A-League Premiership: 2007–2008, 2011–2012
