= Shane Huke =

English footballer (born 1985)

Personal information
- Full name: Shane Huke
- Date of birth: 2 October 1985 (age 41)
- Place of birth: Reading, England
- Height: 1.80 m (5 ft 11 in)
- Position: Defender

Senior career*
| Years | Team | Apps | (Gls) |
| 2001–2003 | Rochedale Rovers | 16 | (2) |
| 2003–2007 | Peterborough United | 29 | (1) |
| 2003 | → King's Lynn (loan) | 4 | (0) |
| 2003–2004 | → Bedford Town (loan) | 3 | (0) |
| 2004 | → Heybridge Swifts (loan) | 9 | (1) |
| 2004–2005 | → Cambridge City (loan) | 3 | (0) |
| 2005 | → AFC Hornchurch (loan) | 0 | (0) |
| 2007–2009 | Dagenham & Redbridge | 36 | (2) |
| 2009 | Central Coast Mariners | 3 | (0) |
| 2010–2011 | Rushden & Diamonds | 40 | (2) |
| 2011–2013 | Dover Athletic | 54 | (4) |
| 2013–2015 | Ebbsfleet United | 41 | (4) |
| 2015–2016 | Maidstone United | 15 | (0) |
| Total | | 256 | (16) |
- * Club domestic league appearances and goals

Shane Huke (born 2 October 1985) is a retired professional footballer who last played for Maidstone United.

== Club career ==
He began his career with Peterborough United, and scored his first competitive goal in his career on 25 November 2006, against Torquay United, a match which Peterborough won 5–2. He moved to Dagenham & Redbridge in May 2007.

Huke was regularly strongly linked with several A-League clubs in Australia. On 23 January 2009, Huke was released by Dagenham & Redbridge for personal reasons. Dagenham manager, John Still said he was very sad and disappointed to be losing Huke.

On 25 March 2010, Huke signed for Rushden & Diamonds until the end of the 2009–10 season.

On 17 May 2011, Huke left Rushden & Diamonds to join Conference South side Dover Athletic on a one-year deal. In May 2012 he signed a new contract with the Kent club.

Huke signed for newly relegated Conference South club Ebbsfleet United in June 2013. He eventually left the club in January 2015, to join Maidstone United

In the summer of 2015, Huke was forced to retire because of a knee injury. He now works as a matchday ambassador for Ebbsfleet United.

== Honours ==
=== Club ===
Maidstone United

- Isthmian League Premier Division: 2014–15
