= Pedj Bojic =

Australian soccer player

Pedj Bojić
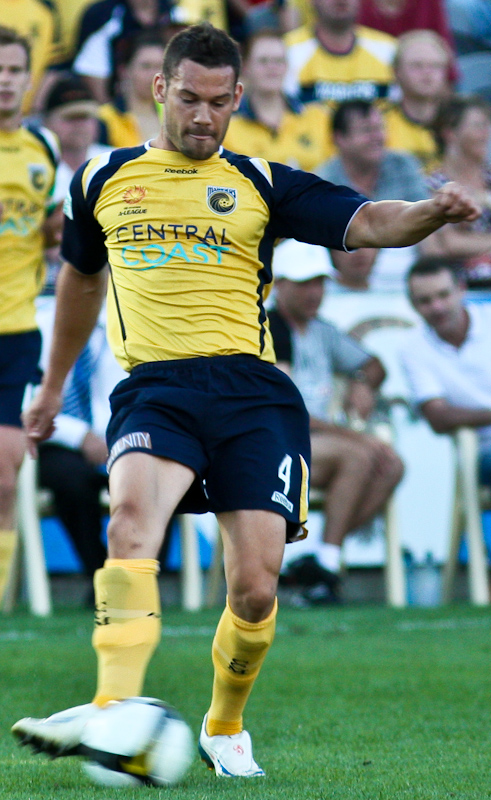
- Bojić playing for Central Coast Mariners in 2008

Personal information
- Full name: Predrag Bojić
- Date of birth: 9 April 1984 (age 42)
- Place of birth: Sydney, Australia
- Height: 1.80 m (5 ft 11 in)
- Position: Right back

Team information
- Current team: Hawkesbury City FC

Senior career*
Years	Team	Apps	(Gls)
2001–2002	Parramatta Power	3	(0)
2003–2004	Sydney Olympic	13	(1)
2004–2007	Northampton Town	115	(6)
2008	Sutherland Sharks	20	(1)
2008–2013	Central Coast Mariners	125	(7)
2013–2015	Sydney FC	20	(0)
2019	Maccabi Hakoah	6	(0)
2021–	Hawkesbury City FC	9	(1)

International career^{‡}
2001	Australia U17	9	(1)
- * Club domestic league appearances and goals as of 11 April 2022 ‡ National team caps and goals as of 31 October 2010

Predrag "Pedj" Bojić (born 9 April 1984) is an Australian soccer player who last played professionally for Sydney FC.

== Club career ==
Bojić's professional career began at Australian club Parramatta Power in the 2000–01 season, where he played for two years. He went to Sydney Olympic and then moved to Northampton in England the following season on a free transfer after a successful trial.

=== Northampton Town ===
Bojić joined the Cobblers at the start of the 2004–05 season, when he became a first team player. With Pedj playing a part, Northampton reached the play-off semi-finals, where they were beaten by Southend United. Next season, he and the club had more luck. He made 23 starts and 18 substitute appearances and scored four league goals as the club finished second in the league and won promotion.

In the 2006–07 season, Bojić played 30 times in League One. Bojić suffered a hernia injury in January 2007, which kept him out for two to four months and eventually led to the end of his Northampton Town career. He is remembered with fondness at Sixfields as a tough tackling right back who gave his all, and popped up with several spectacular goals.

=== Central Coast Mariners ===
On 28 July 2008, Bojić was signed to a one-year deal with the Mariners after impressing in several trials. After becoming a first team regular and impressing at the Mariners, Bojić signed a two-year contract extension on 9 October 2008.

Bojić was released by the Central Coast Mariners on 23 May 2013 and was expected to subsequently sign with Sydney FC.

On 20 July 2013, Bojić started for the A-League All Stars in the inaugural A-League All Stars Game against Manchester United, a match in which the A-League All Stars were thrashed 5–1, courtesy of goals from Danny Welbeck, Jesse Lingard and Robin van Persie. Bojić was substituted off in the 45th minute of the match, and was replaced by Perth Glory defender Joshua Risdon.

=== Sydney FC ===
Bojić signed with Sydney FC on a two-year deal on 19 June 2013. He made his first official appearance for the club in Round 1 of the 2013/14 A-League season at home to the Newcastle Jets. Sydney won the game 2–0 with Bojić putting in a strong performance on debut.

Bojić was released in January 2015.

== Personal ==
Aside from playing professional football, Bojić has his own personal training business in Sydney as well as being heavily involved with his clothing brand "A-List Limited". He is of Serbian heritage.

== Honors ==
=== Club ===
Central Coast Mariners

- A-League Premiership: 2011–12
- A-League Championship: 2012–13

=== International ===
Australia U17

- OFC U-17 Championship: 2001

=== Individual ===
- A-League All Star: 2013

== Career statistics ==
Appearances and goals by club, season and competition
Club	Season	League			Cup		Continental		Total	
Club	Season	Division	Apps	Goals	Apps	Goals	Apps	Goals	Apps	Goals
Parramatta Power	2001–02	National Soccer League	3	0	0	0	0	0	3	0
Parramatta Power	2002–03	National Soccer League	0	0	0	0	0	0	0	0
Sydney Olympic	2003–04	National Soccer League	13	1	0	0	0	0	13	1
Northampton Town FC	2004–05	Football League Two	35	0	7	0	0	0	42	0
Northampton Town FC	2005–06	Football League Two	36	4	7	2	0	0	43	6
Northampton Town FC	2006–07	Football League One	27	0	4	0	0	0	31	0
Northampton Town FC	Northampton Town total		98	4	18	2	0	0	116	6
Sutherland Sharks	2008	NSW Premier League	20	1	3	0	0	0	23	1
Central Coast Mariners	2008–09	A-League	21	0	1	0	5	0	27	0
Central Coast Mariners	2009–10	A-League	25	2	0	0	0	0	25	2
Central Coast Mariners	2010–11	A-League	27	0	0	0	0	0	27	0
Central Coast Mariners	2011–12	A-League	27	2	0	0	4	0	31	2
Central Coast Mariners	2012–13	A-League	25	3	0	0	5	1	30	4
Central Coast Mariners	Mariners total		125	7	1	0	14	1	140	8
Sydney FC	2013–14	A-League	12	0	0	0	0	0	12	0
Sydney FC	2014–15	A-League	8	0	3	0	0	0	11	0
Sydney FC	Sydney total		20	0	3	0	0	0	23	0
Total			279	13	25	2	14	1	318	16
