= Ahmad Elrich =

Australian soccer player (born 1981)

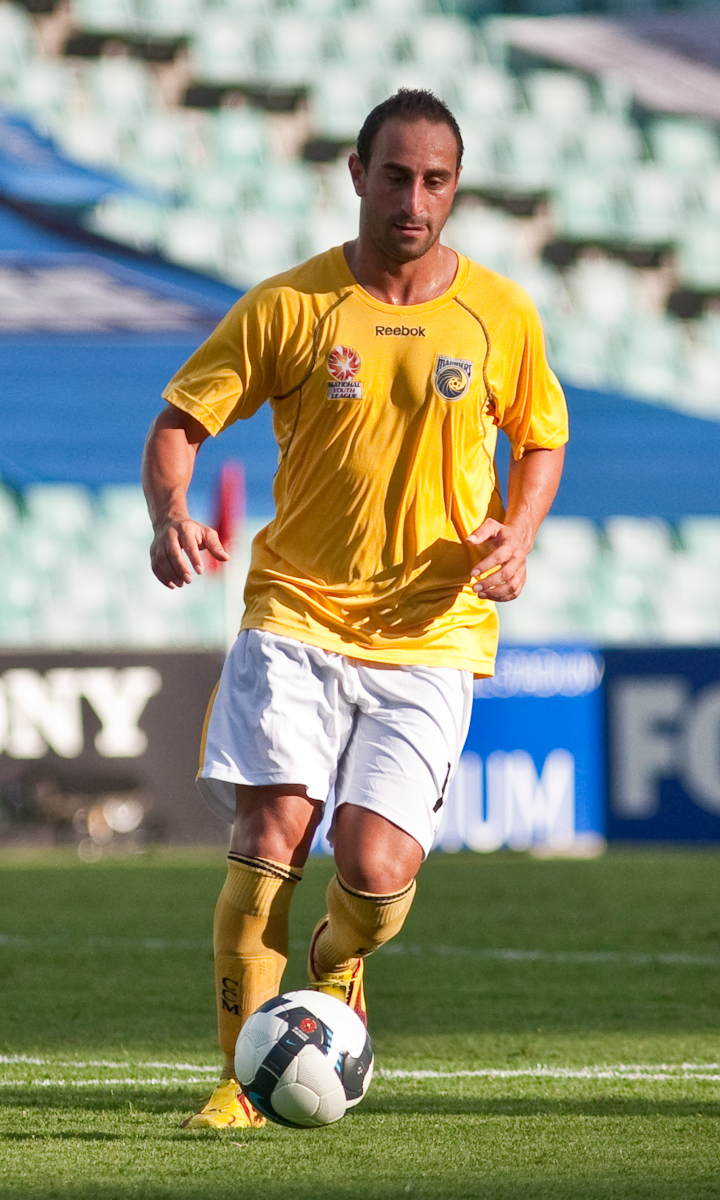
- Elrich with the Central Coast Mariners in 2009

Personal information
- Date of birth: 30 May 1981 (age 45)
- Place of birth: Sydney, New South Wales, Australia
- Height: 1.83 m (6 ft 0 in)
- Position: Right winger

Team information
- Current team: Parramatta FC

Youth career
- Bass Hill

Senior career*
| Years | Team | Apps | (Gls) |
| 1999 | Parramatta Eagles | 9 | (0) |
| 1999–2004 | Parramatta Power | 119 | (19) |
| 2004 | Busan I'Cons | 10 | (1) |
| 2005–2007 | Fulham | 6 | (0) |
| 2006 | → Lyn Oslo (loan) | 6 | (1) |
| 2007–2008 | Wellington Phoenix | 13 | (1) |
| 2008–2010 | Central Coast Mariners | 15 | (1) |
| 2017–2018 | Rydalmere Lions | 37 | (15) |
| 2018– | Parramatta FC | 30 | (4) |
| Total | | 178 | (23) |

International career
| 2001 | Australia U20 | 17 | (2) |
| 2004 | Australia U23 | 9 | (6) |
| 2004–2006 | Australia | 17 | (5) |
Medal record
Representing Australia
Men's Association football
OFC Nations Cup
| Winner | 2004 Australia |
OFC U-19 Men's Championship
| Winner | 2001 Cook Islands/New Caledonia |
- * Club domestic league appearances and goals as of 27 September 2019

Ahmad Elrich (born 30 May 1981) is an Australian professional soccer player who plays as a right winger for Australian club Parramatta FC.

Elrich played 17 games for the Australia national soccer team and played for Fulham in the Premier League.

== Club career ==
=== Australia ===
Elrich began his professional career at the Parramatta Eagles, his home club, being born just west of the club's home ground.

At the end of his first season with the Eagles, he toured Lebanon with a team of Lebanese-Australians. He was offered a contract with Nejmeh SC in Beirut, but declined in favour of returning to Australia.

Returning to Australia he signed with new NSL club Parramatta Power in the club's inaugural squad. Elrich cemented a first-team spot as a free-flowing winger here, including a memorable 2003–04 season where he was one of the league's leading assist getters, and played in the Grand Final at just 22. His time at the Parramatta Power was cut short, as the club and NSL met its demise.

=== South Korea and Fulham ===
Elrich then moved to South Korean side Busan I'cons. After a protracted contract dispute that saw him on the sidelines for five months, he made his move to the English Premier League.

Elrich signed a 3-year deal with Fulham in the Summer of 2005 from K-League club Busan I'cons. He was loaned out to FC Lyn Oslo from April to May 2006.

After signing for Fulham and making his debut against Liverpool in a Premier League match, Elrich's first team appearances were few and far between, but despite signing a 3-year contract in 2006, his future at the club looked in doubt after not being given a squad number for the 2007–08 season and Fulham confirmed Elrich's departure on 4 September 2007.

=== Return to Australia ===
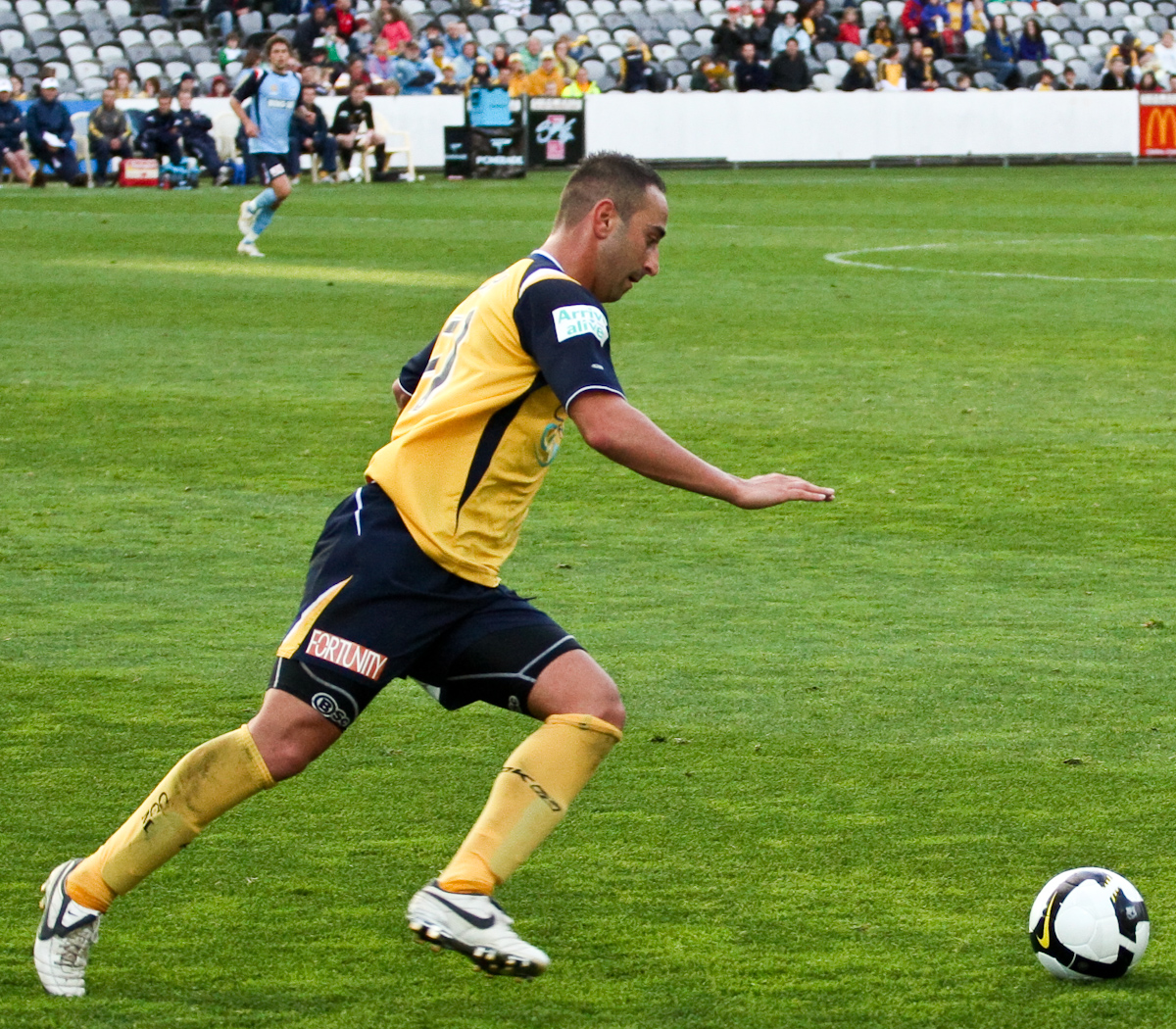
Elrich playing for the Central Coast Mariners

Elrich signed a contract with the Wellington Phoenix in the A-League as their marquee player on 21 September 2007. Elrich scored his first goal, in his first home game, for the Wellington Phoenix against Central Coast Mariners on 21 October 2007, which he described as the 'best goal of his career'. At the end of the 2007–08 season, Ahmad left the Wellington Phoenix to move back to Australia, moving to Central Coast Mariners to link up with several former Parramatta Power teammates. After limited appearances and poor form, he was released by the Central Coast Mariners at the end of the 2009–10 A-League season.

=== Comeback ===
Elrich returned to soccer to play for semi-professional team Rydalmere Lions FC in National Premier Leagues NSW 3 in 2017 after playing regional league soccer with Auburn District in 2016.

== International career ==
Elrich represented Australia at the 2004 Summer Olympics. His inactivity for Fulham FC was seen as the key factor in him not being selected for the Australian World Cup squad. On 6 September 2006, Elrich suffered a serious knee injury whilst playing for Australia in an Asian Cup qualifier against Kuwait.

== Personal life ==
Elrich was born on 30 May 1981 to Lebanese parents Mahmoud and Ahmad. He also has a younger brother, Tarek, who also plays professional football.

In May 2011, Elrich was charged with a number of gun offences and possession of a drug after being pulled over on his motorcycle because of a faulty tail light. He was sentenced to four years and released on 12 October 2015.

== Career statistics ==
Australia national team
| Year | Apps | Goals |
|---|---|---|
| 2004 | 10 | 3 |
| 2005 | 5 | 1 |
| 2006 | 2 | 1 |
| Total | 17 | 5 |

Results list Australia's goal tally first.

| Date | Venue | Opponent | Score | Result | Competition |
|---|---|---|---|---|---|
| 2 June 2004 | Adelaide, Australia | Fiji | 1 goal | 6–1 | 2006 FIFA World Cup qualification |
| 9 October 2004 | Honiara, Solomon Islands | Solomon Islands | 1 goal | 5–1 | 2004 OFC Nations Cup |
| 12 October 2004 | Sydney, Australia | Solomon Islands | 1 goal | 6–0 | 2004 OFC Nations Cup |
| 26 March 2005 | Sydney, Australia | Iraq | 1 goal | 2–1 | Friendly match |
| 22 February 2006 | Manama, Bahrain | Bahrain | 1 goal | 3–1 | 2007 AFC Asian Cup qualification |

== Honours ==
=== Player ===
Australia

- OFC Nations Cup: 2004

Australia U20

- OFC U-19 Men's Championship: 2001

=== Individual ===
Awards

- Joe Marston Medal: 2003–2004 with Parramatta Power
