= List of A-League Men seasons =

The A-League Men is the premier professional men's association football league in Australia. It is currently consists of twelve teams; eleven based in Australia and one based in New Zealand. The league has been contested since 2005, when it was founded as the A-League. In its most recent form, the league includes a 26-round regular season and an end-of-season finals series playoff tournament involving the highest-placed teams, culminating in the Grand Final match. The winning team of the Grand Final is crowned A-League champion, while the regular season winners are dubbed ‘premiers’.

== List of seasons ==
The following is a list of all A-League seasons. It contains the number of teams, the number of regular season matches played, the premier, the champions, teams who have gained Asian qualification and the top scorer(s) in regular season matches—winner of the Golden Boot.

Season (Grand Final)	Teams	Matches	Premiers	Champions	Asia (Note: In addition to the A-League premiers who also qualify for Asia by virtue of their league position.)	Top scorer(s)	
Season (Grand Final)	Teams	Matches	Premiers	Champions	Asia	Player	Goals
2005–06 (2006)	8	84	Adelaide United	Sydney FC	—N/a (Note: Sydney FC also qualified for the 2005 OFC Club Championship by virtue of winning the 2005 Australian Club World Championship Qualifying Tournament. Australia left the Oceania Football Confederation (OFC) for the Asian Football Confederation (AFC) on 1 January 2006.)	Alex Brosque; Bobby Despotovski; Stewart Petrie; Archie Thompson	8
2006–07 (2007)	8	84	Melbourne Victory	Melbourne Victory	Adelaide United	Daniel Allsopp	11
2007–08 (2008)	8	84	Central Coast Mariners	Newcastle Jets	Newcastle Jets	Joel Griffiths	12
2008–09 (2009)	8	84	Melbourne Victory	Melbourne Victory	Adelaide United	Shane Smeltz	12
2009–10 (2010)	10	135	Sydney FC	Sydney FC	Melbourne Victory	Shane Smeltz	19
2010–11 (2011)	11	165	Brisbane Roar	Brisbane Roar	Central Coast Mariners; Adelaide United	Sergio van Dijk	16
2011–12 (2012)	10	135	Central Coast Mariners	Brisbane Roar	Brisbane Roar	Besart Berisha	19
2012–13 (2013)	10	135	Western Sydney Wanderers	Central Coast Mariners	Central Coast Mariners; Melbourne Victory	Daniel McBreen	17
2013–14 (2014)	10	135	Brisbane Roar	Brisbane Roar	Western Sydney Wanderers; Central Coast Mariners	Adam Taggart	16
2014–15 (2015)	10	135	Melbourne Victory	Melbourne Victory	Sydney FC; Adelaide United	Marc Janko	16
2015–16 (2016)	10	135	Adelaide United	Adelaide United	Western Sydney Wanderers; Brisbane Roar	Bruno Fornaroli	23
2016–17 (2017)	10	135	Sydney FC	Sydney FC	Melbourne Victory; Brisbane Roar	Besart Berisha; Jamie Maclaren	19
2017–18 (2018)	10	135	Sydney FC	Melbourne Victory	Newcastle Jets; Melbourne Victory	Bobô	27
2018–19 (2019)	10	135	Perth Glory	Sydney FC	Melbourne Victory; Sydney FC	Roy Krishna	18
2019–20 (2020)	11	144	Sydney FC	Sydney FC	—N/a (Note: Australian clubs withdrew from the 2021 AFC Champions League. Had they participated, Brisbane Roar, Melbourne City and Sydney FC would have been the Australian representatives.)	Jamie Maclaren	22
2020–21 (2021)	12	156	Melbourne City	Melbourne City	Sydney FC; Melbourne Victory	Jamie Maclaren	25
2021–22 (2022)	12	163	Melbourne City	Western United		Jamie Maclaren	15
2022–23 (2023)	12	163	Melbourne City	Central Coast Mariners	Central Coast Mariners; Macarthur FC	Jamie Maclaren	24
2023–24 (2024)	12	169	Central Coast Mariners	Central Coast Mariners	Sydney FC	Adam Taggart	20
2024–25 (2025)	13	176	Auckland FC (Note: Auckland did not qualify for the Champions League Elite as they are from New Zealand and ineligible to participate in AFC competitions.)	Melbourne City	Macarthur FC; Melbourne City	Archie Goodwin; Adrian Segečić	13
2025–26 (2026)	12	156	Newcastle Jets	TBD	Adelaide United; Heidelberg United	Sam Cosgrove; Luka Jovanović	11

== Grand Finals ==
The A-League Men Grand Final is the final match of the A-League Men season, the culmination of the finals series, determining the champions of the tournament.

Year	Date	Home	Score	Away	Man of the Match (Joe Marston Medal)	Stadium	Attendance
2006	5 March	Sydney FC	1–0	Central Coast Mariners	Dwight Yorke (Sydney FC)	Aussie Stadium, Sydney	41,689
2007	18 February	Melbourne Victory	6–0	Adelaide United	Archie Thompson (Melbourne Victory)	Telstra Dome, Melbourne	55,436
2008	24 February	Central Coast Mariners	0–1	Newcastle Jets	Andrew Durante (Newcastle Jets)	Sydney Football Stadium, Sydney	36,354
2009	28 February	Melbourne Victory	1–0	Adelaide United	Tom Pondeljak (Melbourne Victory)	Telstra Dome, Melbourne	53,273
2010	20 March	Melbourne Victory	1–1 (a.e.t.) (2–4 p)	Sydney FC	Simon Colosimo (Sydney FC)	Etihad Stadium, Melbourne	44,650
2011	13 March	Brisbane Roar	2–2 (a.e.t.) (4–2 p)	Central Coast Mariners	Mathew Ryan (Central Coast Mariners)	Suncorp Stadium, Brisbane	50,168
2012	22 April	Brisbane Roar	2–1	Perth Glory	Jacob Burns (Perth Glory)	Suncorp Stadium, Brisbane	50,334
2013	21 April	Western Sydney Wanderers	0–2	Central Coast Mariners	Daniel McBreen (Central Coast Mariners)	Allianz Stadium, Sydney	42,102
2014	4 May	Brisbane Roar	2–1 (a.e.t.)	Western Sydney Wanderers	Thomas Broich (Brisbane Roar); Iacopo La Rocca (Western Sydney Wanderers)	Suncorp Stadium, Brisbane	51,153
2015	17 May	Melbourne Victory	3–0	Sydney FC	Mark Milligan (Melbourne Victory)	AAMI Park, Melbourne	29,843
2016	1 May	Adelaide United	3–1	Western Sydney Wanderers	Isaías (Adelaide United)	Adelaide Oval, Adelaide	50,119
2017	7 May	Sydney FC	1–1 (a.e.t.) (4–2 p)	Melbourne Victory	Daniel Georgievski (Melbourne Victory)	Allianz Stadium, Sydney	41,546
2018	5 May	Newcastle Jets	0–1	Melbourne Victory	Lawrence Thomas (Melbourne Victory)	McDonald Jones Stadium, Newcastle	29,410
2019	19 May	Perth Glory	0–0 (a.e.t.) (1–4 p)	Sydney FC	Miloš Ninković (Sydney FC)	Optus Stadium, Perth	56,371
2020	30 August	Sydney FC	1–0 (a.e.t.)	Melbourne City	Rhyan Grant (Sydney FC)	Bankwest Stadium, Sydney	7,051*
2021	27 June	Melbourne City	3–1	Sydney FC	Nathaniel Atkinson (Melbourne City)	AAMI Park, Melbourne	14,017*
2022	28 May	Melbourne City	0–2	Western United	Aleksandar Prijović (Western United)	AAMI Park, Melbourne	22,495
2023	3 June	Melbourne City	1–6	Central Coast Mariners	Jason Cummings (Central Coast Mariners)	CommBank Stadium, Sydney	26,523

*Attendance limited due to impact of COVID-19 pandemic

== See also ==
- List of A-League honours
- A-League all-time records
