= List of Sydney FC head coaches =

Sydney Football Club is an Australian professional association football club based in Moore Park, Sydney. The club was formed in 2004. They became the first New South Wales member admitted into the A-League in 2005.

There have been ten permanent and one caretaker managers of Sydney FC since 2004; Steve Corica has managed the club in two separate spells as permanent and caretaker manager. Corica is also the club's longest-serving manager. The most successful person to manage Sydney FC is Graham Arnold, who won two A-League premierships, one A-League championship and one FFA Cup between 2014 and 2018.

This chronological list comprises all those who have held the position of manager of the first team of Sydney FC since their foundation in 2004. Each manager's entry includes his dates of tenure and the club's overall competitive record (in terms of matches won, drawn and lost), honours won and significant achievements while under his care. Caretaker managers are included, where known, as well as those who have been in permanent charge.

== Managers ==
- Manager dates are sourced from WorldFootball.net for all managers. Statistics and nationalities are sourced from SFCStatistics.com for Littbarski to Corica. Names of caretaker managers are supplied where known, and periods of caretaker management are highlighted in italics and marked caretaker or caretaker, then permanent appointment, depending on the scenario. Win percentage is rounded to two decimal places.
- Only first-team competitive matches are counted. Wins, losses and draws are results at the final whistle; the results of penalty shoot-outs are not counted.
- Statistics are complete up to and including the match played on 8 O.

Key

- M = matches played; W = matches won; D = matches drawn; L = matches lost; GF = Goals for; GA = Goals against; Win % = percentage of total matches won
- † Managers with this background and symbol in the "Name" column are italicised to denote caretaker appointments.
- ‡ Managers with this background and symbol in the "Name" column are italicised to denote caretaker appointments promoted to full-time manager.

List of Sydney FC managers
Name	Nationality	From	To	M	W	D	L	GF	GA	Win %	Honours	Notes
Pierre Littbarski	Germany	26 February 2005	3 March 2006	38	23	8	7	79	40	60.53	A-League champions: 2006; OFC Club Championship winners: 2005	
Terry Butcher	England	15 July 2006	2 February 2007	29	13	9	7	41	26	44.83		
Branko Culina	Australia	8 February 2007	22 October 2007	20	5	7	8	19	24	25.00		
John Kosmina	Australia	24 October 2007	30 January 2009	40	14	11	15	58	60	35.00		
Vítězslav Lavička	Czech Republic	1 February 2009	30 June 2012	95	35	25	35	123	126	36.84	A-League premiers: 2009–10; A-League champions: 2010	
Ian Crook	England	1 July 2012	11 November 2012	6	2	0	4	9	16	33.33		
Steve Corica †	Australia	12 November 2012	27 November 2012	3	0	1	2	3	6	0.00		
Frank Farina	Australia	28 November 2012	23 April 2014	46	19	7	20	70	69	41.30		
Graham Arnold	Australia	8 May 2014	30 June 2018	142	81	34	27	272	138	57.04	A-League premiers: 2016–17, 2017–18; A-League champions: 2017; FFA Cup winners: 2017	
Steve Corica	Australia	1 July 2018	7 November 2023	180	86	37	57	288	198	47.78	A-League premiers: 2019–20; A-League champions: 2019, 2020; Australia Cup winners: 2023	
Ufuk Talay	Australia	8 November 2023	24 March 2026	91	43	17	31	172	101	47.25		
Patrick Kisnorbo	Australia	24 March 2026		16	8	5	3	24	11	50.00		
