= 2025 A-League Men Grand Final =

2025 edition of the A-League Men Grand Final

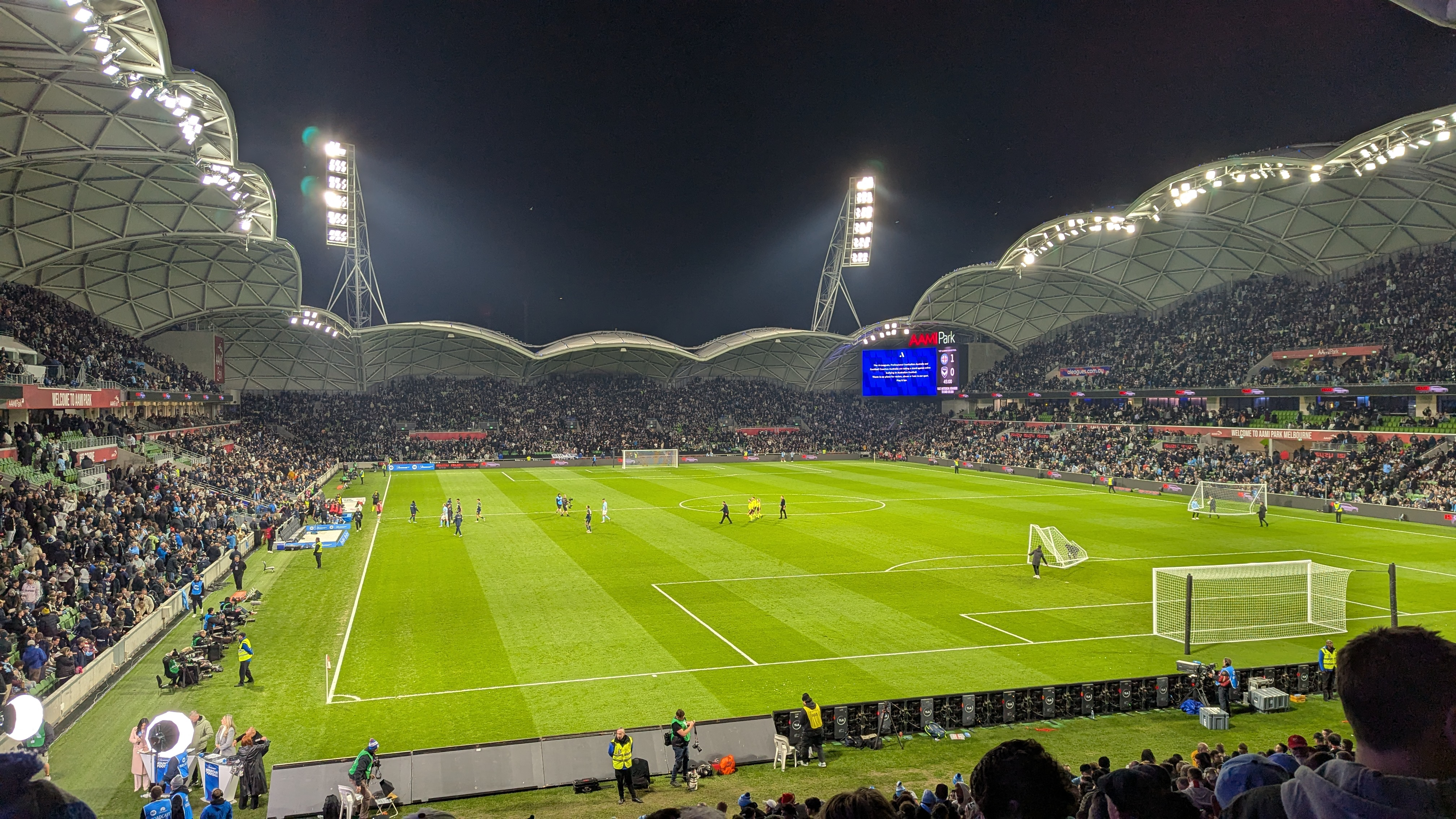
- The match was held at Melbourne Rectangular Stadium
- Event: 2024–25 A-League Men
Melbourne City	Melbourne Victory
1	0
- Date: 31 May 2025
- Venue: AAMI Park, Melbourne
- Joe Marston Medal: Mathew Leckie (Melbourne City)
- Referee: Adam Kersey (Queensland)
- Attendance: 29,902
- Weather: Cloudy; 11 °C (52 °F); 77% humidity

The 2025 A-League Men Grand Final, known officially as the Isuzu UTE A-League Grand Final, was a soccer match played between cross-city rivals Melbourne City and Melbourne Victory on 31 May 2025 at their shared home, Melbourne Rectangular Stadium in Melbourne, Australia.

The match determined the champions of the A-League Men and was the 20th A-League Men Grand Final, the culmination of the 2024–25 season.

== Background ==
Melbourne City played their first Grand Final since 2023, where they lost 6–1 against Central Coast Mariners. This was City's fifth Grand Final in their history, all coming since 2020, having achieved its first championship in 2021 against Sydney FC, after losing to Sydney FC in 2020 City have also been Premiers three times in the 2020–21, 2021–22, and 2022–23 seasons, whilst finishing second in the 2024–25 regular season.

For Melbourne Victory, this was their second consecutive A-League Men Grand Final. This was the first time in the club's history that they play in consecutive Grand Finals, having lost in 2024 against Central Coast Mariners. This will be Victory's eighth Grand Final in the club's history, with their last championship coming in 2018 against the Newcastle Jets and last trophy being the 2021 FFA Cup. This would be Victory coach, Arthur Diles' first grand final as head coach, having been an assistant in 2024. Melbourne Victory finished the 2024–25 regular season in fifth place, with the Victory becoming the first team to qualify for the A-League Grand Final after finishing outside the top four.

The match was the 49th Melbourne Derby, and the first in an A-League Grand Final.

=== Previous finals ===
In the following table, finals until 2004 were in the National Soccer League era, since 2006 were in the A-League Men era.

Team	Previous grand final appearances (bold indicates winners)
Melbourne City	4 (2020, **2021**, 2022, 2023)
Melbourne Victory	7 (**2007**, **2009**, 2010, **2015**, 2017, **2018**, 2024)

== Road to the final ==
=== Summary ===
Following the regular season, a four-week Finals Series was played to determine the winner of the A-League Championship. The top two highest-placed teams were given a bye into the semi-finals, while third to sixth were drawn into the elimination finals; both third and fourth hosted against the sixth and fifth-placed sides respectively. The winners progressed to a two-legged semi-final, first introduced in the 2021–22 season, with the first leg played at the home stadium of the lowest-ranked club. Both legs' results were put into an aggregate score to decide the winners, which would face each other in the Grand Final. Should the aggregate scores were level, the second match would go into extra time, and then to a penalty shoot-out should the score remained level. The away goals rule was not used in the semi-finals. The finalists who placed higher on the table would host the Grand Final.

Melbourne City				Round	Melbourne Victory			
2024–25 A-League Men; 2nd place: Pos / Team / Pld / Pts; 1 / Auckland FC / 26 / 53; 2 / Melbourne City (C) / 26 / 48; 3 / Western United / 26 / 47; 4 / Western Sydney Wanderers / 26 / 46; 5 / Melbourne Victory / 26 / 43; Source: A-Leagues (C) Champions				Regular season	2024–25 A-League Men; 5th place: Pos / Team / Pld / Pts; 3 / Western United / 26 / 47; 4 / Western Sydney Wanderers / 26 / 46; 5 / Melbourne Victory / 26 / 43; 6 / Adelaide United / 26 / 38; 7 / Sydney FC / 26 / 37; Source: A-Leagues			
Opponent	Score			Elimination-finals	Opponent	Score		
Bye				Elimination-finals	Western Sydney Wanderers	2–1 (A)		
Opponent	Agg.	1st leg	2nd leg	Semi-finals	Opponent	Agg.	1st leg	2nd leg
Western United	4–1	3–0 (A)	1–1 (H)	Semi-finals	Auckland FC	2–1	0–1 (H)	2–0 (A)

=== Melbourne City ===
After Aurelio Vidmar was appointed as head coach on a full-time basis, City would go into the 2024–25 seasons as a candidate for premiers and strong favourites for making finals. City would begin the season with a 1–0 win against Newcastle Jets, before losing 3–1 against grand final opponents Melbourne Victory. City would continue the season staying in finals while steadily staying within finals positions and slowly building toward a second place finish at the end of the season. This would qualify City to the semi final stage of the finals series, as well as qualifying them to the 2025–26 AFC Champions League Elite.

City would play Western United in a two legged match to decide who would qualify into the Grand Final, with Western United making the semi final after beating Adelaide United 3–courtesy of a Noah Botic hattrick. The first leg began with a 16th minute goal by Germán Ferreyra for City, before goals by Yonatan Cohen in the 54th minute and Mathew Leckie in the 72nd minute City up 3-0 at the end of the first leg. Aziz Behich would open the second leg with a 20th minute goal to put City up, whilst a Noah Botic consolation goal in the 66th minute saw the match end 1–1 with an aggregate score of 4–1. This qualified Melbourne City into the Grand Final, setting up a first Melbourne Derby Grand Final.

=== Melbourne Victory ===
Melbourne Victory's season began with a loss in the 2024 Australia Cup final under head coach Patrick Kisnorbo. Kisnorbo later abruptly left the club for Yokohama F. Marinos, seeing Arthur Diles becoming manager of the club on a temporary basis. On 31 January 2025, Diles was then signed on a full-time basis.

Victory finished the season in fifth place with a total of 43 points, setting up an away elimination final against the Western Sydney Wanderers. Victory winger Daniel Arzani created both goals, with defender Kasey Bos and midfielder Zinédine Machach scoring in the seventh and 42nd minutes, nullifying a Wanderers equaliser in the 23rd minute by Zac Sapsford. The match ended 2–1, leading Victory to progress through to the semi-finals. The first leg of the semi final would be played at Melbourne Victory's home of AAMI Park on 17 May 2025. Logan Rogerson scored the lone goal for Auckland, leading to Auckland gaining a 1–0 advantage. The second leg would be played at Auckland's home stadium of Go Media Stadium a week later, with the stadium's capacity increased by 2,700 seats to enable more fans into the stadium. In the week before the second leg, Victory defender Brendan Hamill suffered a rupture of his anterior cruciate ligament (ACL), seeing previously suspended captain Roderick Miranda take his place in the second leg team. Whilst Auckland held strong in the first half, two quickfire second half goals from Machach and Bruno Fornaroli would prove decisive in winning the tie and making the Grand Final.

== Pre-match ==
=== Venue selection ===
The results of the semi-finals confirmed the Grand Final would be hosted by Melbourne City at their shared home ground, AAMI Park, the following week. AAMI Park has a capacity of 30,050 fans.

The match was the fourth A-League Men Grand Final hosted at the venue, after 2015, 2021, and the latest edition in 2022, all of which featured either Melbourne City or Melbourne Victory.

=== Ticketing ===
Tickets went on sale for the match on 26 May. The club members pre-sale saw around 16,000 tickets sold before the public sale. The match officially sold out the following day. It subsequently became the highest attendance at AAMI Park for a sporting event, attracting 29,902 spectators.

=== Broadcasting ===
The match was broadcast on Network 10 and Paramount+ for Australian viewers, Sky Sport for New Zealand viewers, and YouTube for some international viewers. Although the regular season was broadcast on ESPN3 for viewers in the United States, neither the finals series nor the Grand Final were broadcast in the United States, with coverage unavailable on both ESPN and YouTube.

=== Officiating ===
The officials for the match were confirmed on 29 May. Adam Kersey was named to officiate his first-ever A-League Men Grand Final after being the referee in the second leg semi-final between City and Western United the previous week.

George Lakrindis and Emma Kocbek were named as assistant referees, with Kocbek becoming the first on-field female match official to be appointed to the fixture in the competition’s history. Hugh Fenton-White was named as their reserve.

The fourth official duties were given to Shaun Evans, with Lara Lee being named the video assistant referee, along with Alex King and Kearney Robinson being her assistant for the match.

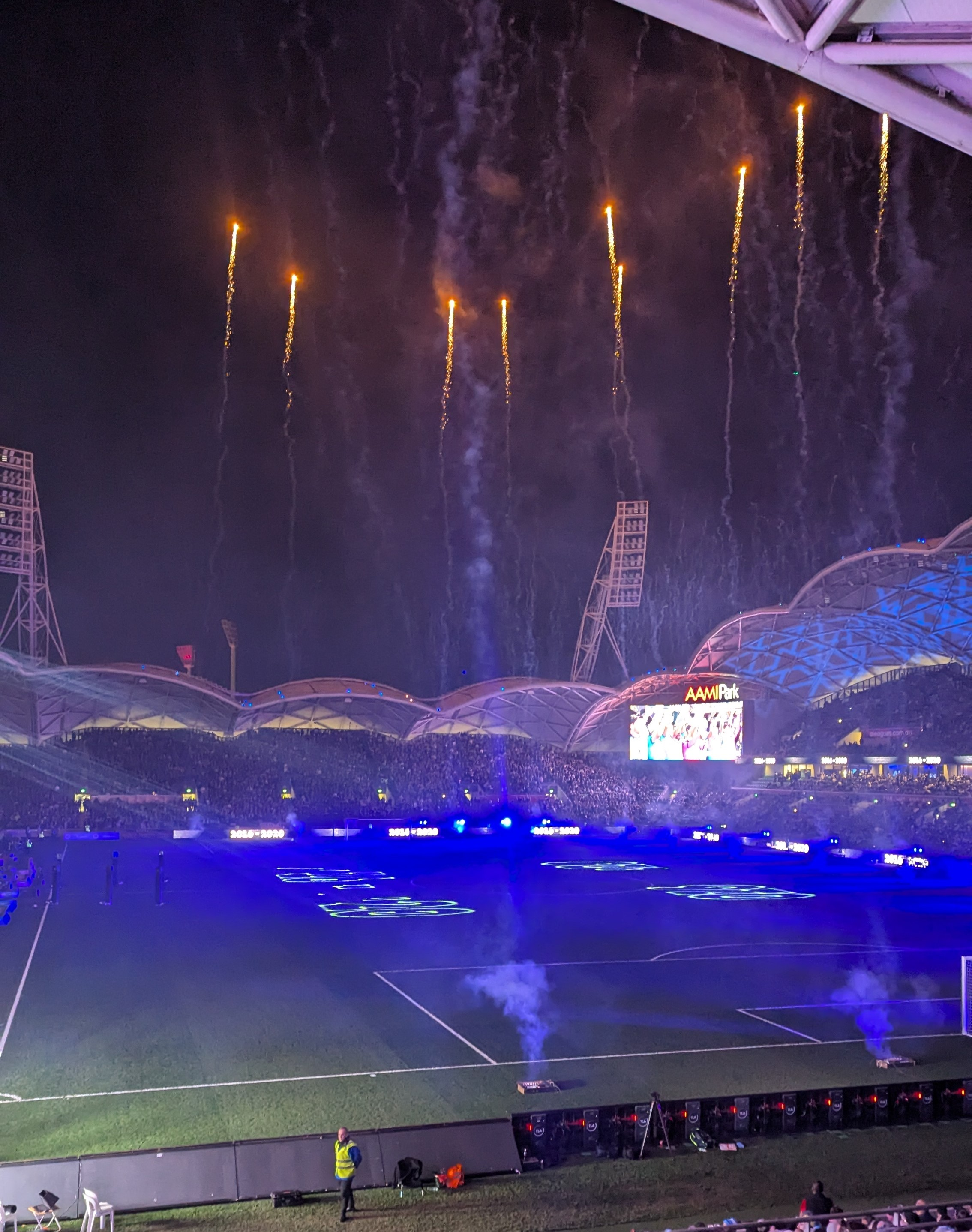
AAMI Park during the pre-game entertainment.

=== Team selection ===
Squads of both clubs for the match were named on 29 May. Melbourne City welcomed the return of Lawrence Wong from injury into the squad, along with Harry Shillington, who was promoted into the first-team squad. Jimmy Jeggo, Andrew Nabbout, Samuel Souprayen, Jayden Necovski and James Nieuwenhuizen all missed selection through injury. Melbourne Victory saw Adama Traore, Fabian Monge, and Kasey Bos all returned to the squad from their second leg semi-final win against Auckland FC. Brendan Hamill was unavailable due to a knee injury.

The final matchday teams saw Mathew Leckie earn a starting position in Melbourne City's XI in place of Alessandro Lopane, who moved to the bench. Melbourne Victory saw one key change to their starting team, with Kasey Bos replacing the injured Nishan Velupillay.

=== Entertainment ===
In the build-up of the match both clubs' supporters marched before the game with a high police presence, causing an atmosphere that was described afterwards as being "overwhelming and unacceptable". The heavy police presence painted the team's supporters in a poor light. the game also had a pre-game entertainment where both clubs would sing their respective pre-match songs of Stand By Me and Happy Together, followed up by a performance celebrating the twenty years of the A-League Men. Both teams’ supporter groups also had displays before the match.

== Match ==
=== Summary ===
==== First half ====
Melbourne Victory started the stronger in the match, forcing early chances and errors from the Melbourne City defence. However, in the 10th minute, a Melbourne City counter-attack lead to an early goal being scored by Israeli winger Yonatan Cohen, after a Max Caputo shot from close distance hit the crossbar before rebounding into Cohen's path. The lead-up play to the goal included a back-heel pass from City captain Aziz Behich to Andreas Kuen who initially crossed the ball to Caputo.

In the 19th minute, Mathew Leckie blocked a shot from Victory midfielder Zinédine Machach, which proved to be crucial. Five minutes later, a header from Leckie at the other end of the pitch was kept off the goal-line by Victory keeper Jack Duncan.

As the first half went on, both teams' defences were proving strong with chances being saved at both ends. Melbourne City went into half time of the grand final with a 1–0 lead.

==== Second half ====
The second half started with a brilliant save by Duncan after a curling shot from City's first half goal-scorer Cohen 45 seconds into the half. City midfielder Mathew Leckie copped a stray boot from an opponent which required medical attention and a brief pause in play.

In the 64th minute, Melbourne City squandered a golden opportunity to double their lead after an Aziz Behich cross led to a wayward header from Victory centre-back Lachlan Jackson, where Jackson fell to ground and the ball fell to Max Caputo, who shot wide despite having Cohen and Steven Ugarkovic wide open across the box with an out of position Jack Duncan.

An open header from Yonatan Cohen in the 76th minute from a Marco Tilio cross went astray which would have put the result beyond doubt, but kept Victory in the match. A call for a penalty to Melbourne Victory after a handball deemed to be natural position was committed in the box by City defender Germán Ferreyra was denied quickly. Replays showed it striking the arm of the defender, but with his back to the ball the correct decision was made.

With seven minutes of injury time awarded, Victory defender Josh Rawlins had a chance with a late header, but it flew wide. The match ended 1–0 to Melbourne City, sparking wild celebrations at the south-end of AAMI Park.

=== Details ===
31 May 2025
19:40 AEST (UTC+10:00)

Melbourne City	1–0	Melbourne Victory
Cohen 10'	Report

AAMI Park, Melbourne
Attendance: 29,902
Referee: Adam Kersey (Queensland)

Melbourne City	Melbourne Victory

GK	33	(Australia) Patrick Beach
RB	13	(Australia) Nathaniel Atkinson
CB	22	(Argentina) Germán Ferreyra
CB	27	(Australia) Kai Trewin
LB	16	(Australia) Aziz Behich (c)
CM	6	(Australia) Steven Ugarkovic
CM	7	(Australia) Mathew Leckie	(yellow card) 79'
RW	10	(Israel) Yonatan Cohen	(yellow card) 33'	(substituted off) 90+7'
AM	30	(Austria) Andreas Kuen		(substituted off) 79'
LW	23	(Australia) Marco Tilio	(yellow card) 90+6'
CF	17	(Australia) Max Caputo		(substituted off) 65'
Substitutes:
GK	18	(Australia) Dakota Ochsenham
DF	2	(Australia) Callum Talbot		(substituted on) 90+7'
MF	19	(Australia) Zane Schreiber
MF	21	(Australia) Alessandro Lopane		(substituted on) 79'
MF	41	(Australia) Lawrence Wong
MF	47	(Australia) Kavian Rahmani
FW	35	(Australia) Medin Memeti		(substituted on) 65'
Manager:
(Australia) Aurelio Vidmar

GK	25	(Australia) Jack Duncan
RB	22	(Australia) Joshua Rawlins	(yellow card) 73'
CB	21	(Portugal) Roderick Miranda (c)
CB	4	(Australia) Lachlan Jackson		(substituted off) 74'
LB	28	(Australia) Kasey Bos
CM	6	(Australia) Ryan Teague	(yellow card) 86'
CM	14	(Australia) Jordi Valadon
RW	7	(Australia) Daniel Arzani		(substituted off) 89'
AM	8	(France) Zinédine Machach		(substituted off) 89'
LW	11	(Brazil) Clarismario Santos		(substituted off) 60'
CF	10	(Australia) Bruno Fornaroli		(substituted off) 74'
Substitutes:
GK	1	(Australia) Mitchell Langerak
DF	3	(Ivory Coast) Adama Traoré
DF	16	(Australia) Joshua Inserra	(yellow card) 78'	(substituted on) 74'
MF	23	(Australia) Alexander Badolato		(substituted on) 60'
MF	27	(Australia) Reno Piscopo		(substituted on) 89'
FW	9	(Greece) Nikos Vergos		(substituted on) 74'
FW	19	(Australia) Jing Reec		(substituted on) 89'
Manager:
(Australia) Arthur Diles

Man of the Match (Joe Marston Medal):
Mathew Leckie (Melbourne City)

Assistant referees:
George Lakrindis (Victoria)
Emma Kocbek (New South Wales)
Fourth official:
Shaun Evans (Victoria)
Reserve assistant referee:
Hugh Fenton-White (New South Wales)
Video assistant referee:
Lara Lee (Queensland)
Assistant video assistant referees:
Alex King (Queensland)
Kearney Robinson (New South Wales)

Match rules

- 90 minutes.
- 30 minutes of extra time if necessary.
- Penalty shoot-out if scores still level.
- Seven named substitutes.
- Maximum of five substitutions, with a sixth allowed in extra time. (Note: Each team is given only three opportunities to make substitutions, with a fourth opportunity in extra time, excluding substitutions made at half-time, before the start of extra time and at half-time in extra time.)

=== Statistics ===
First half
Statistic	Melbourne City	Melbourne Victory
Goals scored	1	0
Total shots	3	9
Shots on target	2	2
Saves	2	1
Ball possession	48%	52%
Corner kicks	1	2
Fouls committed	10	5
Offsides	1	0
Yellow cards	1	0
Red cards	0	0

Second half
Statistic	Melbourne City	Melbourne Victory
Goals scored	0	0
Total shots	5	5
Shots on target	2	1
Saves	1	2
Ball possession	46%	54%
Corner kicks	3	2
Fouls committed	9	10
Offsides	0	0
Yellow cards	3	3
Red cards	0	0

Overall
Statistic	Melbourne City	Melbourne Victory
Goals scored	1	0
Total shots	8	14
Shots on target	4	3
Saves	3	3
Ball possession	47%	53%
Corner kicks	4	4
Fouls committed	19	15
Offsides	1	0
Yellow cards	4	3
Red cards	0	0

== Post-match ==
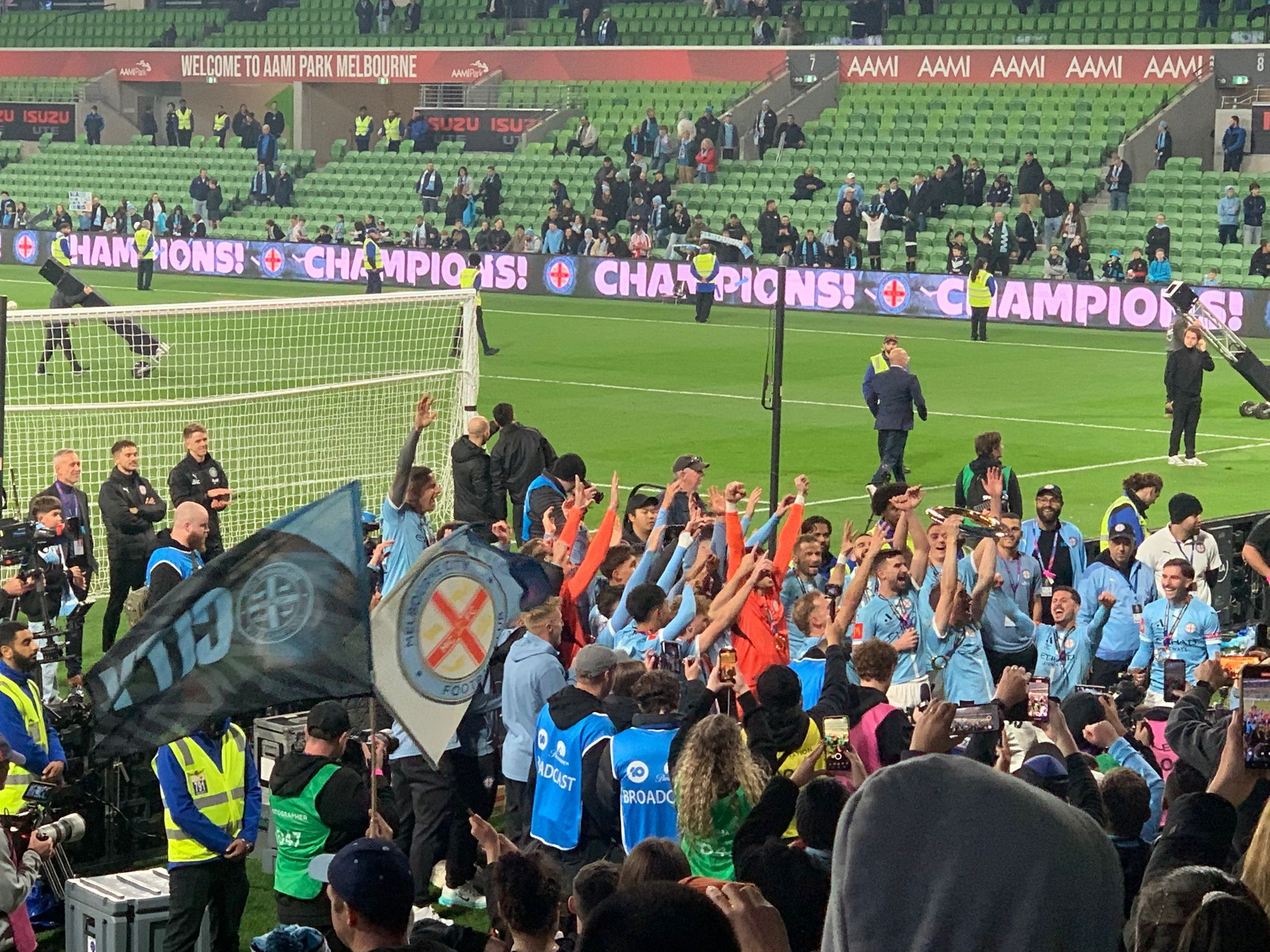
Melbourne City celebrating after their Grand Final victory.

The result was City's second A-League Men championship. Victory's defeat meant they had lost two grand finals in a row, and Victory coach Arthur Diles' first finals foray was unsuccessful.

Mathew Leckie was awarded the Joe Marston Medal for the best player of the match. It was revealed post-match that Leckie entered the match with a hamstring strain sustained in training in the week leading-up to the match and "a busted nose and other facial injuries" due to an incident during the match.

The match attracted 1.09 million viewers across Network 10, being number 1 in the timeslot for 25 to 45 year olds, and 16 to 39 year olds.

In the aftermath of the game, Melbourne Victory's Managing Director Caroline Carnegie told Sharnelle Vella and Bob Murphy from ABC Radio that the heavy police presence painted the team's supporters in a poor light. Carnegie also stated "We're concerned about A-League fans being marred". In a letter to fans of the evening of 2 June 2025, Melbourne Victory chairman John Dovaston said the scenes were "overwhelming and unacceptable". These reports overshadowed a well run and amazing night.

Five days after the match, City captain Aziz Behich scored a 90th minute winner for the Socceroos in a World Cup qualifier against Japan, which effectively qualified his nation to the 2026 FIFA World Cup the following year.
