= A-League Men Grand Final =

Association football match to determine the season champions

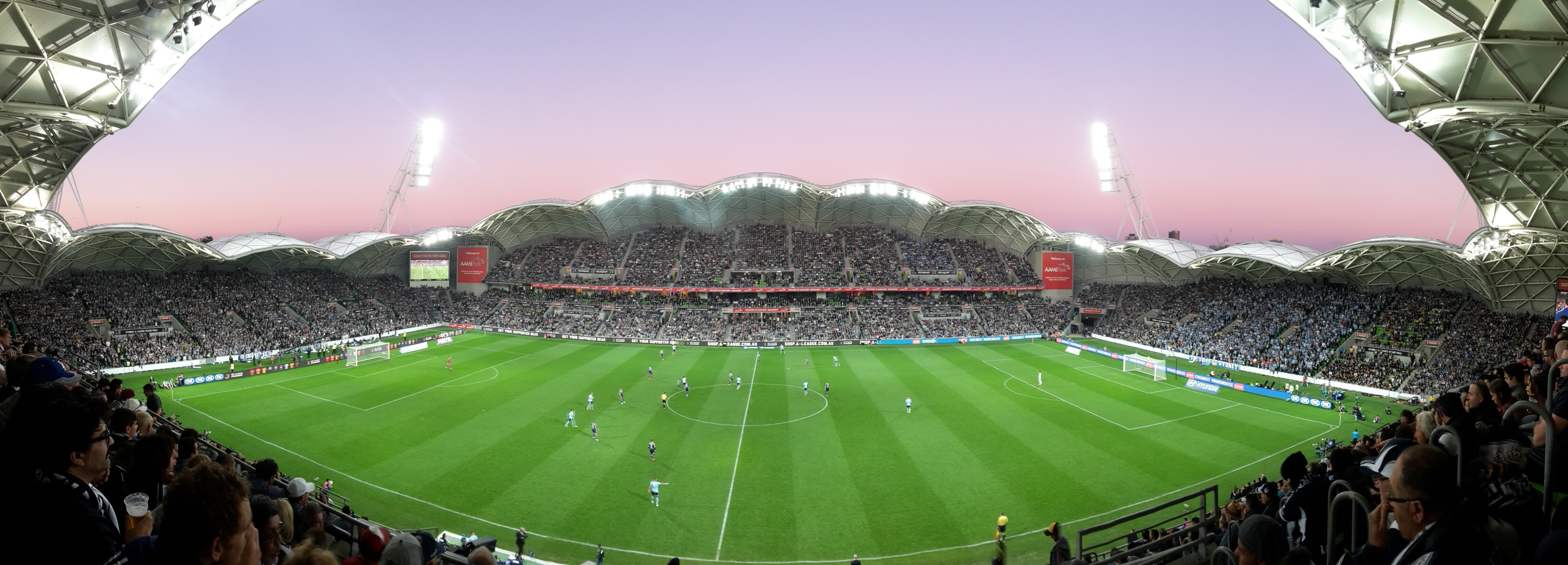
- Panorama of Melbourne Rectangular Stadium during the 2015 A-League Grand Final
- Sport: Association football
- First meeting: 5 March 2006
- Latest meeting: 23 May 2026
- Next meeting: 2027
- Broadcasters: Network 10

Statistics
- Total meetings: 21
- Most wins: Sydney FC (5)

The A-League Men Grand Final is an association football match to determine the champions for an A-League Men season. Played at the end of the finals series, the game has been held annually since 2006.

The club which wins the grand final receives the A-League Men championship trophy, and the best player receives the Joe Marston Medal.

As of 2026, a total of 21 grand finals have been played, four of which have ended in penalty shoot-outs. Sydney FC have won five grand finals, the most of any club; Melbourne Victory have the second-most with four, and Central Coast Mariners and Brisbane Roar third-most with three. Sydney FC have also appeared in the most grand finals, a total of eight; and the only club along with Brisbane Roar and the Central Coast Mariners to win back-to-back Grand Finals. Every current A-League Men's club has played in at least one grand final, with the exception of Macarthur FC and Wellington Phoenix.

== Match history ==
=== Early years (2005–2010) ===
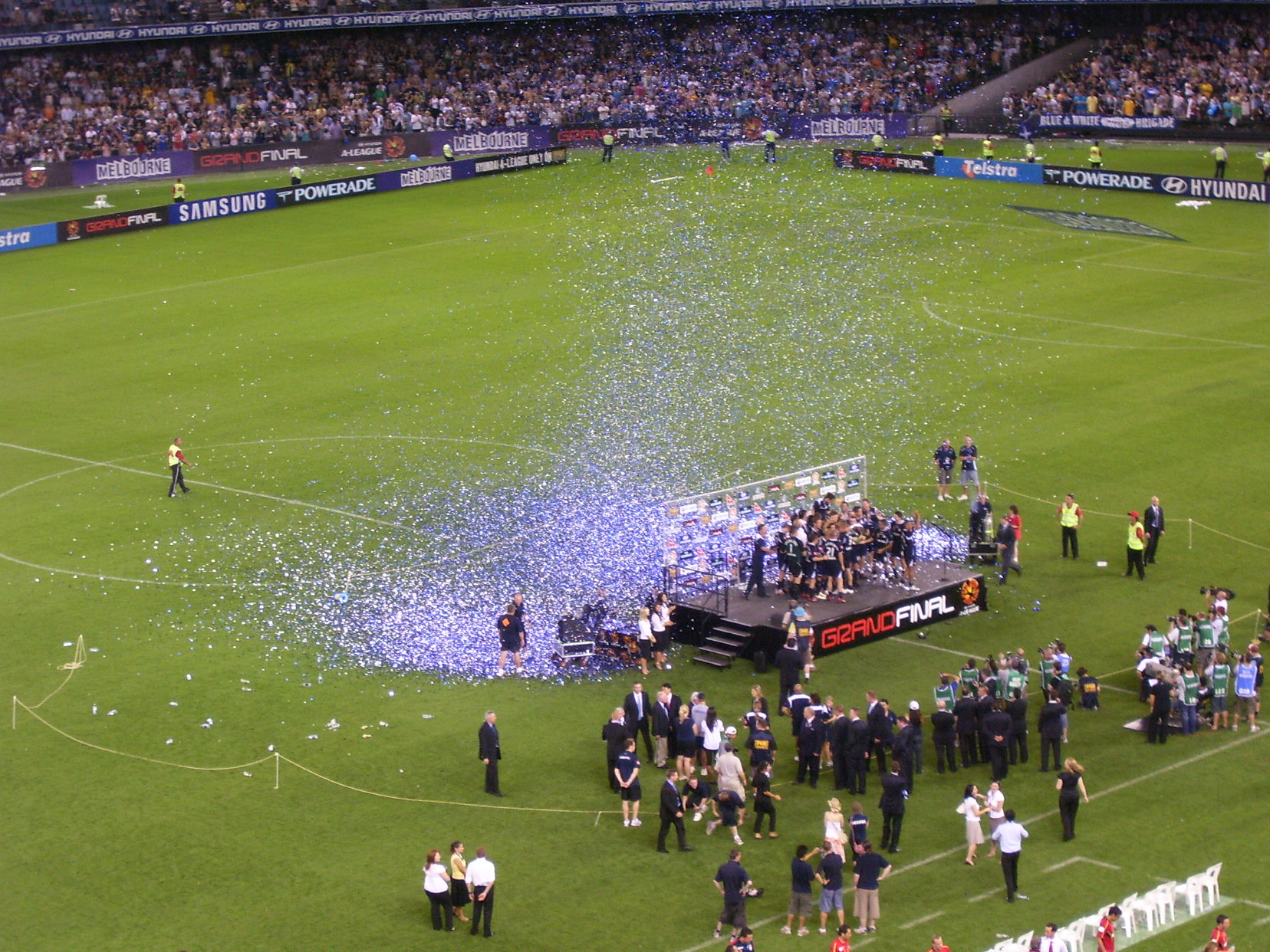
Melbourne Victory celebrating their 2007 A-League Grand Final victory.

The A-League Men was established for the 2005–06 season by eight clubs, after the National Soccer League folded in 2004. The national league finals system was then reverted to the page playoff system, so only top four teams can qualify. The first grand final in 2006 took place at Sydney Football Stadium between Sydney FC and Central Coast Mariners as Sydney FC won the home ground advantage by defeating premiers Adelaide United to host. Sydney won 1–0 to become the first champions of the A-League Men. The first Joe Marston Medalist was Dwight Yorke, captain of Sydney FC at the time. In 2007, The Original Rivalry teams of premiers Melbourne Victory defeated Adelaide United 6–0; the largest margin of an A-League Men grand final. At Docklands Stadium, it set the largest sporting attendance at the venue of 55,436. Archie Thompson scored five in the match; the only player to score five goals in an A-League Men grand final, earning him the Joe Marston Medal.

In the grand final in 2008 between the Central Coast Mariners and Newcastle Jets, despite Central Coast as the host winner, Central Coast Stadium was deemed by FFA to have insufficient capacity to host the grand final, Sydney Football Stadium instead hosted the grand final for the second time, which was won 1–0 by Newcastle. The Original Rivalry teams returned to the grand final in 2009, with Victory claiming their second championship; winning 1–0 against Adelaide becoming the first A-Leagues club to win the domestic treble. Melbourne Victory and Sydney FC, teams of The Big Blue were the grand finalists of 2010; the fourth consecutive rivalry grand final since 2007. Sydney won 4–2 after the first penalty shoot-out in the A-League Men grand final after a 1–1 draw at Etihad Stadium's third and final A-League Men grand final.

=== 2011–2019 ===
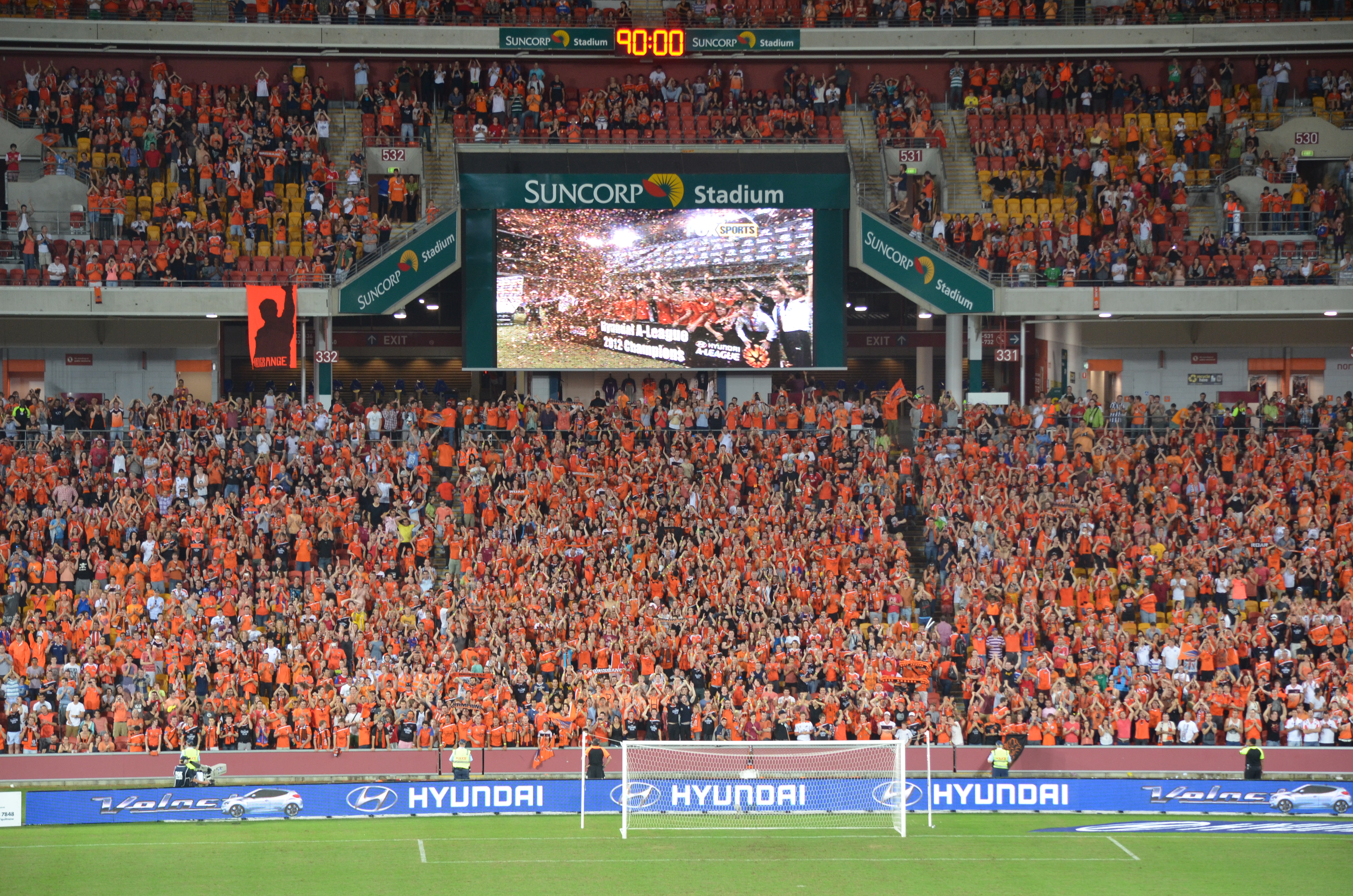
Brisbane Roar fans during the 2012 A-League Grand Final trophy ceremony.

With Brisbane Roar claiming the premiership and hosting the grand final in 2011 against Central Coast Mariners, it became the first grand final since its establishment outside of Melbourne and Sydney, to be hosted at Lang Park in Brisbane. Brisbane won 4–2 on penalties, after a 2–2 draw by two late Brisbane goals in the final four minutes of extra time. Mathew Ryan with the Central Coast Mariners won the Joe Marston Medal as the first to win it on the losing team of the A-League Men grand final. It returned to Lang Park the following year in 2012, with Brisbane against the Perth Glory; 2–1 via a late comeback winner, becoming the first A-League Men club to win back-to-back grand finals.

The Western Sydney Wanderers in their first ever season reached the 2013 grand final against the Central Coast Mariners. The host venue was again chosen as Sydney Football Stadium for the third time, due to Wanderers' home ground Parramatta Stadium unable to host due to insufficient capacity for the event. Central Coast won 2–0, after losing their past three grand finals. Western Sydney Wanderers reached the grand final again the following year in 2014 with Brisbane Roar hosting for the third time at Lang Park for the last three of four grand finals since 2011. Brisbane won 2–1 in extra time to win a record third grand final. The Big Blue teams (Melbourne Victory and Sydney FC) reached the grand final to meet for the second time in 2015. Due to Docklands Stadium and Melbourne Cricket Ground being unavailable for the event, Melbourne Rectangular Stadium became the last option to play host for the 2015 grand final. Melbourne Victory won 3–0; a record equalling third grand final win to the Brisbane Roar. Adelaide United played host for the first time in their third grand final against the Western Sydney Wanderers also in their third in the past four for the 2016 grand final. Adelaide Oval was the chosen venue, instead of Adelaide's usual home ground Hindmarsh Stadium due to bigger capacity and for hosting high-profile matches. Adelaide United won 3–1 to record their first grand final win and the Western Sydney Wanderers' third loss still yet to win.

The Big Blue teams played the 2017 hosted at Sydney Football Stadium in Sydney for the fourth time, as Sydney won 4–2 on penalties after a 1–1 draw to equal Brisbane Roar and Melbourne Victory on most grand final wins with three. Newcastle Jets reached the grand final in 2018 after a ten-year drought against the Melbourne Victory hosted at Newcastle International Sports Centre for the first time. Victory won 1–0 for a record fourth grand final win. Kosta Barbarouses' 9th-minute goal in the match become the fastest scored in the A-League Men grand final. It also ultimately sparked controversy for the video assistant referee (VAR) that failed to detect an offside for Victory's awarded goal. Perth Glory qualified for their first grand final since 2012 in Brisbane against Sydney FC at Perth Stadium attended by 56,371; the current record of an A-League Men grand final attendance. Sydney won 4–1 on penalties after 0–0 draw; the third time they won on penalties and the record equalling fourth win overall.

=== 2020–present ===
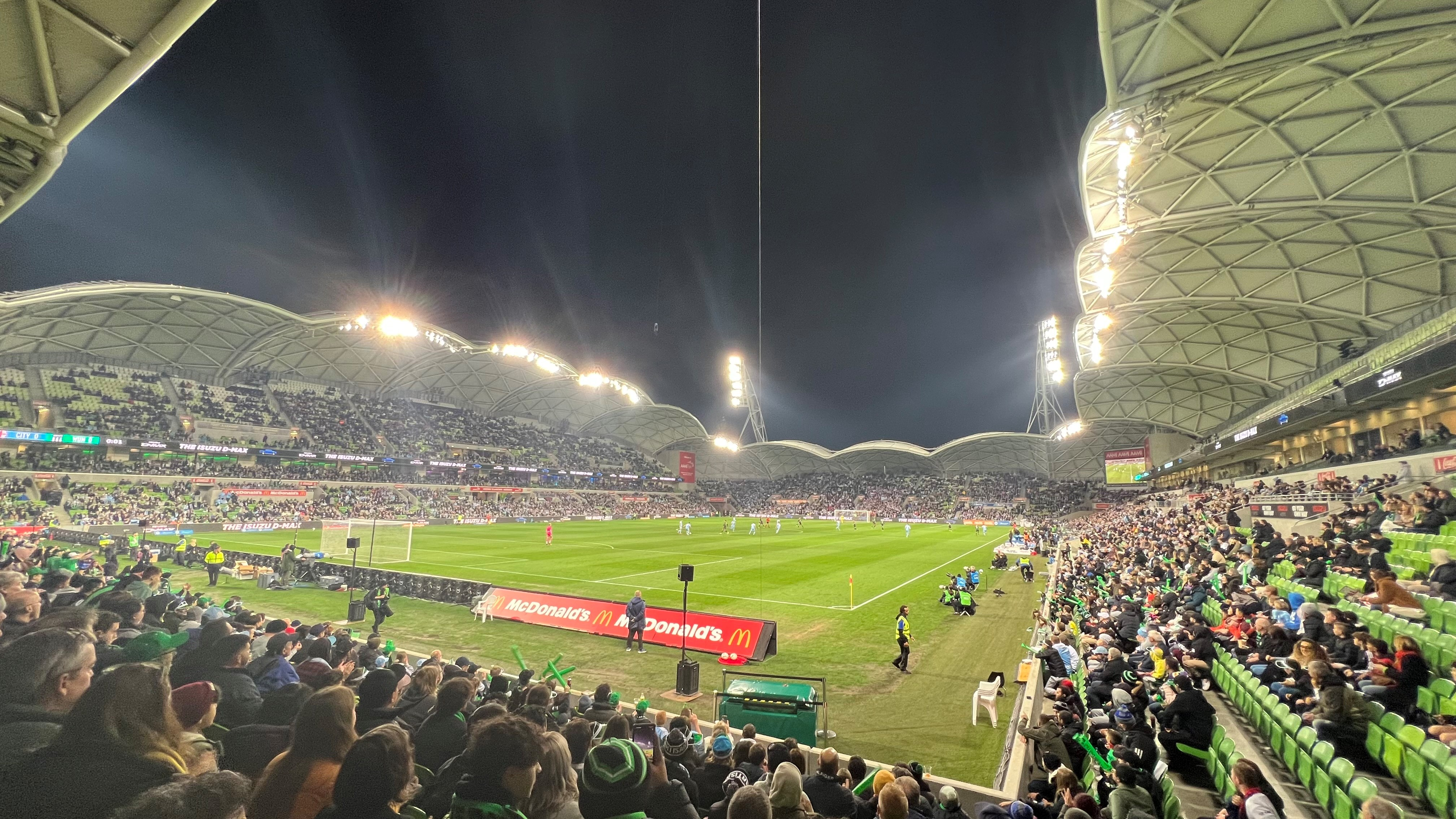
The 2022 A-League Men Grand Final at AAMI Park.

During the 2019–20 A-League season, it was impacted by the COVID-19 pandemic in Australia and ultimately suspended the season in March 2020. From that point, matches were played behind closed doors, teams travelled interstate, and crowds were restricted for the semi-finals and grand final. These measures caused the entire finals series to be played at Western Sydney Stadium, meaning the 2020 grand final would be first to be hosted at a neutral venue. Whilst originally scheduled for May 2020, it was postponed to August 2020; the first time the A-League Men grand final was played after May. The match was played between Sydney FC and first-timers Melbourne City in a restricted crowd of 7,051. Sydney won 1–0 after extra time to win a record fifth Australian championship and grand final. The same teams met the following year in 2021 with Melbourne City claiming the host at Melbourne Rectangular Stadium in a 14,017 sell-out crowd of half-capacity, with travelling fans unable to attend due to Sydney's 2021 lockdown. City claimed revenge and won 3–1 to win their first A-League Men grand final. City reached the 2022 grand final for their third consecutive appearance; against locals Western United. It was the first grand final since the COVID-19 pandemic in Australia with no crowd restrictions. Western United won 2–0 to win their first grand final in their third season of existence.

It was announced in December 2022, that the 2023, 2024 and 2025 A-Leagues grand finals would be played in Sydney as part of a deal with Destination NSW, breaking the tradition of the highest placed team to host their grand final; the announcement initially being met with universal backlash from fans of all clubs, former players and active support groups. The 2023 grand final was then initially set to play at Western Sydney Stadium which would be the second time it would host there, both times as a neutral venue. Melbourne City and Central Coast Mariners were the participants for this grand final, as Central Coast won 6–1; the second A-League Men grand final where a team scored six goals. Fan controversies continued after the match, for the shape of Melbourne City's disadvantages for the match such as outnumbered fans and not hosting at Melbourne Rectangular Stadium. The Sydney grand final decision was eventually reversed in October 2023, in replacement of Unite Round.

== Results ==
=== By final ===
Year	Date	Team 1	Score	Team 2	Venue	Attendance	Joe Marston Medal
2006	5 March	Sydney FC	1–0	Central Coast Mariners	Sydney Football Stadium	41,689	(Trinidad and Tobago) Dwight Yorke
2007	18 February	Melbourne Victory	6–0	Adelaide United	Docklands Stadium	55,436	(Australia) Archie Thompson
2008	24 February	Central Coast Mariners	0–1	Newcastle Jets	Sydney Football Stadium	36,354	(Australia) Andrew Durante
2009	28 February	Melbourne Victory	1–0	Adelaide United	Docklands Stadium	53,273	(Australia) Tom Pondeljak
2010	20 March	Melbourne Victory	1–1 (a.e.t.) (2–4 p)	Sydney FC	Docklands Stadium	44,560	(Australia) Simon Colosimo
2011	13 March	Brisbane Roar	2–2 (a.e.t.) (4–2 p)	Central Coast Mariners	Lang Park	50,168	(Australia) Mathew Ryan
2012	22 April	Brisbane Roar	2–1	Perth Glory	Lang Park	50,334	(Australia) Jacob Burns
2013	21 April	Western Sydney Wanderers	0–2	Central Coast Mariners	Sydney Football Stadium	42,102	(Australia) Daniel McBreen
2014	4 May	Brisbane Roar	2–1 (a.e.t.)	Western Sydney Wanderers	Lang Park	51,153	(Germany) Thomas Broich (Italy) Iacopo La Rocca
2015	17 May	Melbourne Victory	3–0	Sydney FC	Melbourne Rectangular Stadium	29,843	(Australia) Mark Milligan
2016	1 May	Adelaide United	3–1	Western Sydney Wanderers	Adelaide Oval	50,119	(Spain) Isaías
2017	7 May	Sydney FC	1–1 (a.e.t.) (4–2 p)	Melbourne Victory	Sydney Football Stadium	41,546	(North Macedonia) Daniel Georgievski
2018	5 May	Newcastle Jets	0–1	Melbourne Victory	Newcastle International Sports Centre	29,410	(Australia) Lawrence Thomas
2019	19 May	Perth Glory	0–0 (a.e.t.) (1–4 p)	Sydney FC	Perth Stadium	56,371	(Serbia) Miloš Ninković
2020	30 August	Sydney FC	1–0 (a.e.t.)	Melbourne City	Western Sydney Stadium	7,051 (Note: Crowd was restricted to 25% capacity due to the COVID-19 pandemic in Australia.)	(Australia) Rhyan Grant
2021	27 June	Melbourne City	3–1	Sydney FC	Melbourne Rectangular Stadium	14,017 (Note: Crowd was restricted to 50% capacity due to the COVID-19 pandemic in Australia.)	(Australia) Nathaniel Atkinson
2022	28 May	Melbourne City	0–2	Western United	Melbourne Rectangular Stadium	22,495	(Serbia) Aleksandar Prijović
2023	3 June	Melbourne City	1–6	Central Coast Mariners	Western Sydney Stadium	26,523	(Australia) Jason Cummings
2024	25 May	Central Coast Mariners	3–1 (a.e.t.)	Melbourne Victory	Central Coast Stadium	21,379	(England) Ryan Edmondson
2025	31 May	Melbourne City	1–0	Melbourne Victory	Melbourne Rectangular Stadium	29,902	(Australia) Mathew Leckie
2026	23 May	Auckland FC	1–0	Sydney FC	Mount Smart Stadium	28,374	(New Zealand) Cameron Howieson

=== By team ===
Club	Wins	Winning years	Runners-up	Runners-up years	Total grand finals
Sydney FC	5	2006, 2010, 2017, 2019, 2020	3	2015, 2021, 2026	8
Melbourne Victory	4	2007, 2009, 2015, 2018	4	2010, 2017, 2024, 2025	8
Brisbane Roar	3	2011, 2012, 2014	0		3
Central Coast Mariners	3	2013, 2023, 2024	3	2006, 2008, 2011	6
Melbourne City	2	2021, 2025	3	2020, 2022, 2023	5
Adelaide United	1	2016	2	2007, 2009	3
Newcastle Jets	1	2008	1	2018	2
Western United	1	2022	0		1
Auckland FC	1	2026	0		1
Western Sydney Wanderers	0		3	2013, 2014, 2016	3
Perth Glory	0		2	2012, 2019	2

== Trophy and awards ==
=== Championship trophy ===
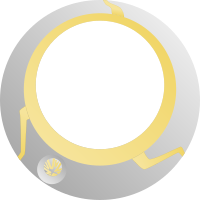
The A-League Men championship trophy

The A-League Men's championship trophy is the main prize for winning the grand final and being crowned champions. Designed by Sydney design company D3 Design, it resembles a laurel wreath. "We used this model as a basis for a unique, cutting-edge design – our trophy is a modern and versatile translation of the wreath. The winners can hold it above their heads as a symbol of success"." It is nicknamed the "Toilet Seat" due to its shape.

=== Joe Marston Medal ===
The Joe Marston Medal is the award given to the player of the match of the A-League Men grand final. It is named after Joe Marston who played for the Australia men's national soccer team from 1947 to 1958 and a member of Preston North End in the 1954 FA Cup final.

It has been awarded ever since the 1980 NSL season which was first won by Abbas Saad with Sydney Olympic. Until the A-League Men was formed, Dwight Yorke with Sydney FC became the first to win the Joe Marston Medal under the A-League Men. Currently, no one has won the award more than once in the A-League Men era.

== Stadiums ==
The stadiums of an A-League Men grand final varies through the highest placed semi-final winning team to host in their own vicinity. Two exceptions have occurred in 2020 due to the COVID-19 pandemic in Australia and 2023 due to the Sydney grand final decision; both of which have been played at Western Sydney Stadium.

Multiple instances have occurred where clubs' home stadiums are deemed insufficient to host the grand final and instead move to a venue with more capacity in their vicinity. Examples include Central Coast Mariners in 2007 hosting at Sydney Football Stadium instead of Central Coast Stadium; and Western Sydney Wanderers in 2013 also hosting at Sydney Football Stadium instead of Parramatta Stadium.

Stadium	Location	No. hosted	Years hosted
Sydney Football Stadium	Sydney	4	2006, 2008, 2013, 2017
Melbourne Rectangular Stadium	Melbourne	4	2015, 2021, 2022, 2025
Docklands Stadium	Melbourne	3	2007, 2009, 2010
Lang Park	Brisbane	3	2011, 2012, 2014
Western Sydney Stadium	Sydney	2	2020, 2023
Adelaide Oval	Adelaide	1	2016
Mount Smart Stadium	Auckland	1	2026
Newcastle International Sports Centre	Newcastle	1	2018
Perth Stadium	Perth	1	2019
Central Coast Stadium	Gosford	1	2024

Italics: Neutral venue

== Television broadcast ==
Australian television viewers
Year	Viewers	Network		Ref.
Year	Viewers	Pay	FTA	Ref.
2007	282,000	Fox Sports	—	
2013	297,000	Fox Sports	—	
2014	772,000	Fox Sports	SBS	
2015	442,000	Fox Sports	SBS	
2017	553,000	Fox Sports	SBS	
2019	406,000	Fox Sports	Network 10	
2020	173,000	Fox Sports	ABC TV	
2022	174,000	Paramount+	Network 10	
2023	264,000	Paramount+	Network 10	
2024	1,120,000	Paramount+	Network 10	
2025	1,090,000	Paramount+	Network 10	
