= List of Western United FC head coaches =

Western United Football Club is an Australian professional association football club based in Truganina, Melbourne. The club was formed in 2017 as Western Melbourne before it was shortly renamed to Western United.

There has been two permanent managers of Western United since 2019. Former Wellington Phoenix coach, Marko Rudan was the first to manage the club while John Aloisi currently manages the club.

== Managers ==
- Only first-team competitive matches are counted. Wins, losses and draws are results at the final whistle; the results of penalty shoot-outs are not counted.
- Statistics are complete up to and including the match played on 14 March 2024.

Key

- M = matches played; W = matches won; D = matches drawn; L = matches lost; GF = Goals for; GA = Goals against; Win % = percentage of total matches won
- † Managers with this background and symbol in the "Name" column are italicised to denote caretaker appointments.
- ‡ Managers with this background and symbol in the "Name" column are italicised to denote caretaker appointments promoted to full-time manager.

List of Western United FC managers
Name	Nationality	From	To	M	W	D	L	GF	GA	Win %	Honours	Notes
Marko Rudan	Australia	23 May 2019	8 June 2021	54	21	7	26	77	86	38.89		
John Aloisi	Australia	15 July 2021	Present	84	34	15	35	114	100	40.48	A-League Men champions: 2022	
