= 2021 A-League Grand Final =

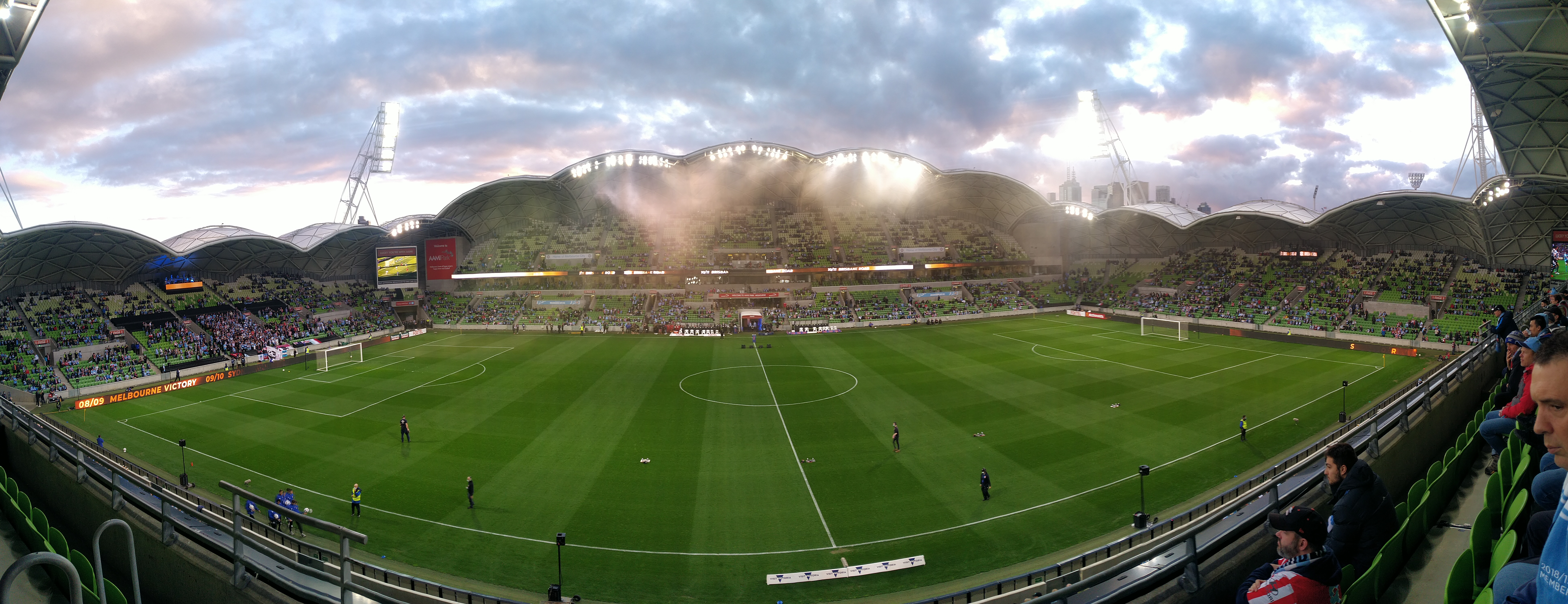
- A panorama of AAMI Park prior to kick off
- Event: 2020–21 A-League
Melbourne City	Sydney FC
3	1
- Date: 27 June 2021
- Venue: AAMI Park, Melbourne
- Joe Marston Medal: Nathaniel Atkinson
- Referee: Chris Beath
- Attendance: 14,017
- Weather: Sunny and clear 12.0 °C (53.6 °F)

The 2021 A-League Grand Final was the 16th A-League Grand Final, the championship-deciding match of the Australian A-League and the culmination of the 2020–21 season. The match was played between season premiers Melbourne City and the second-placed team and championship holders Sydney FC on 27 June 2021 at AAMI Park in Melbourne.

Melbourne City won their first championship by beating Sydney 3–1.

== Teams ==
In the following table, finals until 2004 were in the National Soccer League era, since 2006 were in the A-League era.

Team	Previous final appearances (bold indicates winners)
Melbourne City	1 (2020)
Sydney FC	6 (**2006**, **2010**, 2015, **2017**, **2019**, **2020**)

== Route to the final ==
The 2020–21 season was the league's sixteenth since its inception in 2005, and the 44th season of top-flight association football in Australia. Twelve teams competed in the regular season, with each team playing a total of 26 matches, resulting in an uneven fixture that involved some clubs meeting three times and others meeting only twice. The top six teams qualified for the finals series, which were played in a straight-knockout format, with the top two teams earning an automatic place in the semi-finals and the bottom four teams playing off in elimination finals. The two winners of the semi-finals met in the grand final. Melbourne City and Sydney FC qualified for the semi-finals by virtue of finishing first and second respectively, whilst Central Coast Mariners (third) met Macarthur FC (sixth) in the first elimination final and Brisbane Roar (fourth) took on Adelaide United (fifth) in the second elimination final. Macarthur defeated Central Coast Mariners two goals to nil, both goals coming in extra time and Adelaide United defeated Brisbane Roar two goals to one. As the top-ranked team, Melbourne City were paired with and defeated Macarthur, the lowest-ranked winning team, 2–0, for their semi-final, whilst Sydney FC were victorious against Adelaide United in the other semi-final, the scoreline being 2–1.

Due to crowd restrictions imposed as a result of the COVID-19 pandemic in Victoria, Melbourne City's home semi-final was moved to Netstrata Jubilee Stadium in New South Wales.

Melbourne City		Round	Sydney FC	
1st place: Pos / Team / Pld / Pts; **1** / Melbourne City (C) / **26** / **49**; 2 / Sydney FC / 26 / **47**; 3 / Central Coast Mariners / 26 / **42**; 4 / Brisbane Roar / 26 / **40**; 5 / Adelaide United / 26 / **39**; Source: A-Leagues (C) Champions		Regular season	2nd place: Pos / Team / Pld / Pts; 1 / Melbourne City (C) / 26 / **49**; **2** / Sydney FC / **26** / **47**; 3 / Central Coast Mariners / 26 / **42**; 4 / Brisbane Roar / 26 / **40**; 5 / Adelaide United / 26 / **39**; Source: A-Leagues (C) Champions	
Opponent	Score		Opponent	Score
Bye week	N/A	Elimination finals	Bye week	N/A
Macarthur FC	2–0	Semi-finals	Adelaide United	2–1

== Pre-match ==
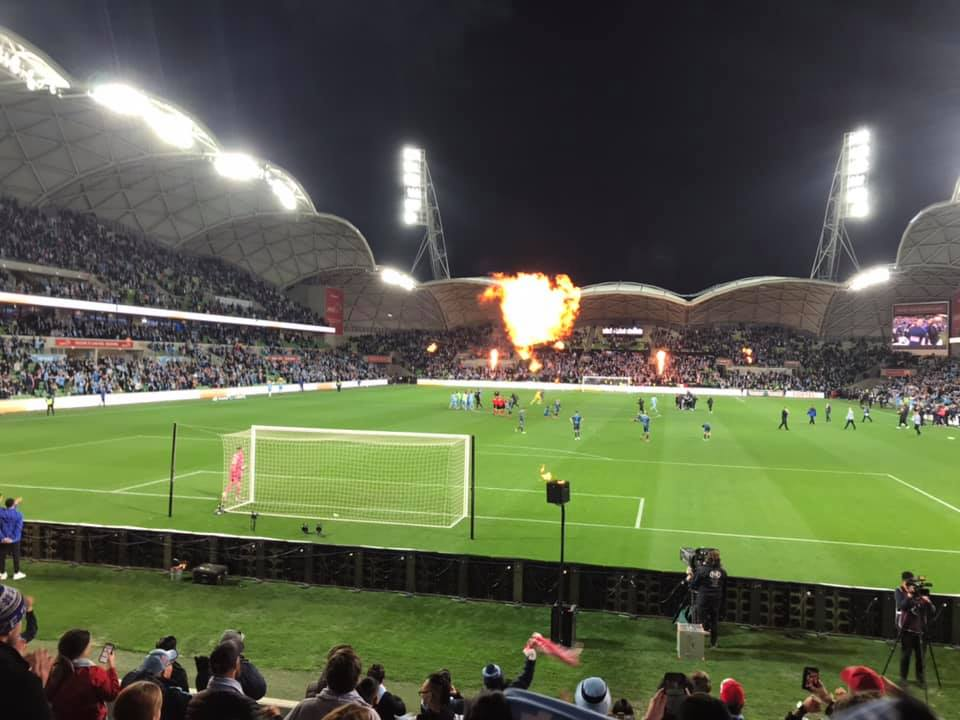
AAMI Park in Melbourne hosted the Grand Final.

=== Venue ===
The Grand Final was held at AAMI Park, Melbourne, Victoria, the home ground of Melbourne City. It was the second Grand Final hosted at the venue, after 2015.

=== Attendance ===
Due to COVID-19 restrictions, the stadium was limited to 50% capacity. Tickets for the game were sold out, resulting in a final attendance of 14,017 spectators. Due to a COVID-19 lockdown in Sydney, many travelling fans for the away team were unable to attend the match.

=== Broadcasting ===
The Grand Final was broadcast throughout Australia live on Fox Sports and streamed for free on Kayo Sports through the Kayo Freebies initiative. This was also the last A-League match broadcast on Fox Sports after a sixteen-year association with the broadcaster, with the A-League moving to Network 10 and Paramount+. In the United States, the Grand Final was shown on ESPN+.

== Match ==
=== Summary ===
Despite early dominance from Melbourne City, they slipped to an early disadvantage after Sydney FC's Kosta Barbarouses hit a powerful effort past City goalkeeper Thomas Glover. Shortly after this goal, the eventual Joe Marston medalist Nathaniel Atkinson scored for City to put the teams level at 1–1. In the 35th minute of the match, Sydney midfielder Luke Brattan was sent off after accumulating two yellow cards, allowing Melbourne to continue to dominate after this point in the match. They eventually won the game 3–1 thanks to further goals from captain Scott Jamieson and Scott Galloway, and claimed their first A-League championship.

=== Details ===
27 June 2021
17:05 AEST

Melbourne City	3–1	Sydney FC
Atkinson 23'; Jamieson 45+1' (pen.); Galloway 90+3'	Report	Barbarouses 21'

AAMI Park, Melbourne
Attendance: 14,017
Referee: Chris Beath

**Melbourne City**	**Sydney FC**

GK	1	(Australia) Tom Glover
RB	2	(Australia) Scott Galloway
CB	4	(Portugal) Nuno Reis
CB	7	(Australia) Rostyn Griffiths
LB	3	(Australia) Scott Jamieson (c)
CM	10	(France) Florin Berenguer
CM	8	(Australia) Aiden O'Neill
CM	20	(Uruguay) Adrián Luna
RF	13	(Australia) Nathaniel Atkinson
CF	17	(Australia) Stefan Colakovski	(yellow card) 73'	(substituted off) 74'
LF	23	(Australia) Marco Tilio	(yellow card) 54'
Substitutes:
GK	33	(Australia) Matt Sutton
DF	19	(Australia) Ben Garuccio
DF	36	(Australia) Kerrin Stokes
MF	16	(Australia) Taras Gomulka
FW	11	(England) Craig Noone
FW	15	(Australia) Andrew Nabbout		(substituted on) 74'
FW	35	(Australia) Raphael Borges Rodrigues
Head coach:
(Australia) Patrick Kisnorbo

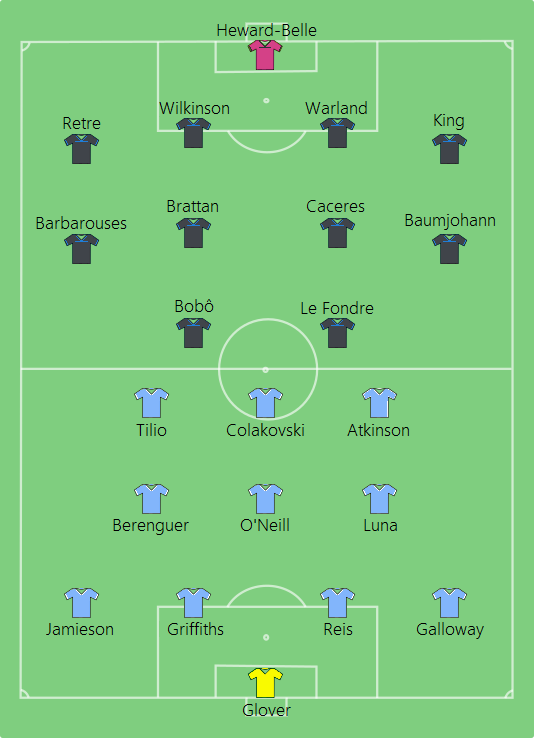

GK	20	(Australia) Tom Heward-Belle
RB	8	(Australia) Paulo Retre
CB	4	(Australia) Alex Wilkinson (c)
CB	3	(Australia) Ben Warland
LB	16	(Australia) Joel King
CM	17	(Australia) Anthony Caceres		(substituted off) 86'
CM	26	(Australia) Luke Brattan	(yellow card) 25' (yellow-red card) 35'
RM	11	(New Zealand) Kosta Barbarouses
LM	5	(Germany) Alexander Baumjohann		(substituted off) 72'
CF	9	(Brazil) Bobô		(substituted off) 38'
CF	99	(England) Adam Le Fondre
Substitutes:
GK	30	(Australia) Adam Pavlesic
DF	2	(Australia) Patrick Flottmann
DF	21	(Australia) Harry Van Der Saag		(substituted on) 38'
DF	25	(Australia) Callum Talbot
MF	10	(Serbia) Miloš Ninković		(substituted on) 72'
FW	18	(Australia) Luke Ivanovic
FW	33	(Australia) Patrick Wood		(substituted on) 86'
Head coach:
(Australia) Steve Corica

Joe Marston Medal:
Nathaniel Atkinson (Melbourne City)

Assistant referees:
Matthew Cream
Nathan MacDonald
Fourth official:
Daniel Elder
Fifth official:
Wilson Brown
Video assistant referee:
Kris Griffiths-Jones

**Match rules**

- 90 minutes.
- 30 minutes of extra time if necessary.
- Penalty shoot-out if scores still level.
- Seven named substitutes.
- Maximum of three substitutions, with a fourth allowed in extra time.

=== Statistics ===
Overall statistics
	Melbourne City	Sydney FC
Goals scored	3	1
Total shots	26	3
Shots on target	8	1
Ball possession	69.5%	30.5%
Corner kicks	10	1
Fouls conceded	15	14
Offsides	1	1
Yellow cards	2	2
Red cards	0	1
