= History of Western United FC =

The history of Western United Football Club covers the time from the club's foundation to their first three seasons in the A-League Men. Western United Football Club was founded in 2018 as Western Melbourne in a bidding process to expand the number of teams in the A-League for the 2019–20 season. They were chosen as one of two new A-League clubs along with Macarthur FC, who would enter the competition a season later for the 2020–21 A-League season. Western United's first season had the club finish 5th and progress to the semi-finals.

== Western Melbourne bid and Pre-first season (2018–19) ==
Western United were founded as Western Melbourne in 2018 as part of a bidding process as the Western Melbourne Group to potentially be chosen as one of two teams out of eight bids to join the A-League; Australia's premier soccer competition. It was confirmed four months later that the Western Melbourne Group was accepted by the FFA for the club to join the A-League along with Macarthur FC. They were to play their first two seasons playing their home matches at GMHBA Stadium while the club enters plans to building a permanent home ground in Tarneit called the Wyndham City Stadium proposed to finish in 2021.

Their first coaching staff signing came on 11 January 2019 where John Anastasiadis as their assistant coach. They decided to change their club name to Western United Football Club via a public vote held in the Herald Sun newspaper. It was then confirmed that Western United announced their club's colours and identity for their first season wearing a green and black strip on their kits.

Western United revealed their crest on 8 May 2019 which was made, based on the club's fans thoughts, and a modern brand identity for the club. On 23 May 2019, the club announced that Marko Rudan would be their head coach in their inaugural season. Western United played their first match on 22 August 2019 against Caroline Springs George Cross at the City Vista Pavilion and Sports Field, where they won 4–0 in front of over 3,000 spectators. During plans for the club's inaugural season, the FFA announced that Western United would not be participating potentially their first FFA Cup in 2019.

== Mark Rudan and inaugural season (2019–20) ==
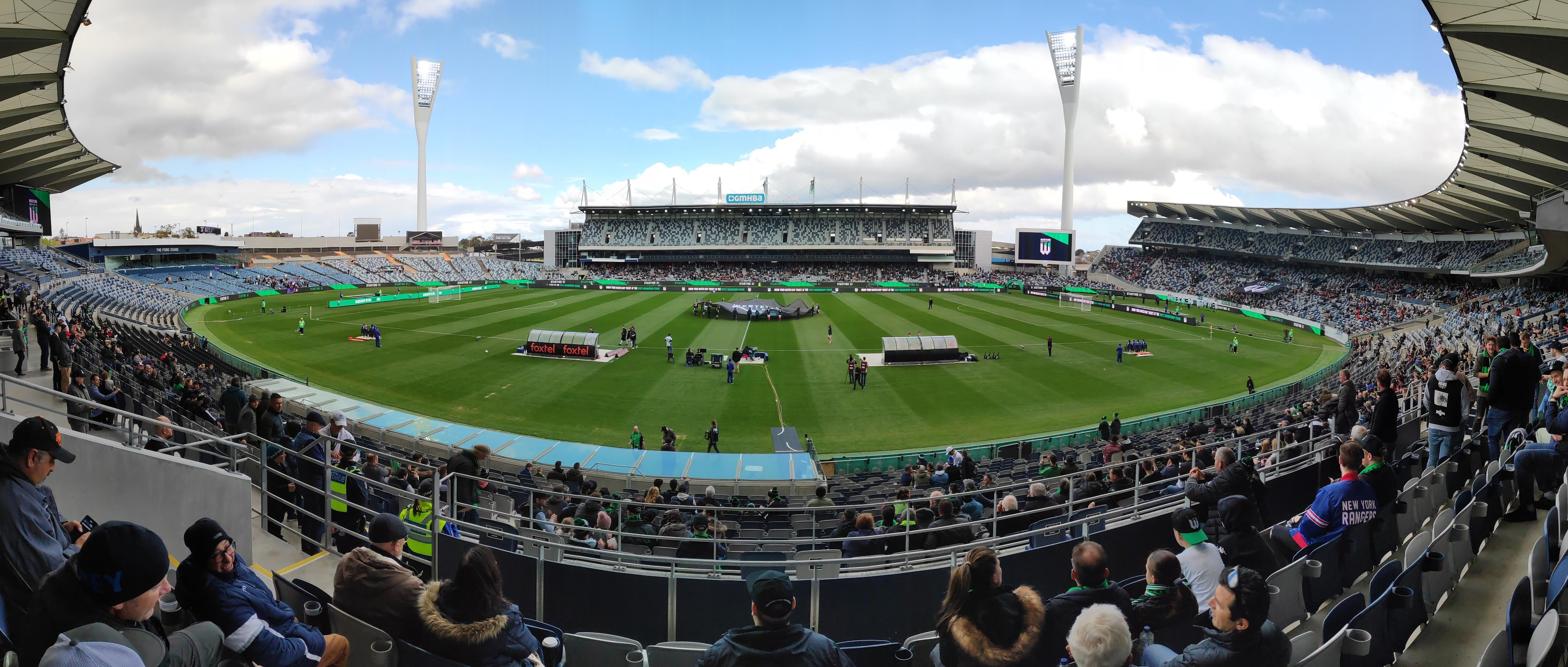
Western United's debut home match at GMHBA Stadium, against Perth Glory on 19 October 2019

Western United's first season in the A-League commenced on 13 October 2019 with a 1–0 win against Wellington Phoenix; the goalscorer being the competition's all-time top goalscorer Besart Berisha. Six days later, they played their first competitive home match on 19 October 2019 with over 6,000 spectators attending the match in a 1–1 draw against Perth Glory.

After the season went on hold due to the COVID-19 pandemic in Australia to play the remainder of the season in New South Wales, in three days the FFA sought exemptions for all three Victorian clubs in the league to travel to NSW to play their remaining games. The day after, it was announced that the three clubs will stay in Victoria until they were let in New South Wales with an official exemption the next day. Prior to the break of the season in 2019–20, they played home matches in three different stadiums across Victoria; GMHBA Stadium, Mars Stadium and Whitten Oval. Their first finals series involved the team winning 1–0 against Brisbane Roar, until they lost in the semi-final 2–0 against cross-town rivals Melbourne City.

== Second season and lowest attendance (2020–21) ==
Before the start of their second season, Western United announced that they were to play four home games at AAMI Park on 18 December 2020 having three home grounds again to play at. Western United's second season started as the commencer for the 2020–21 A-League season in Australia in Geelong against Adelaide United ending in a 0–0 draw in front of 5,000 spectators. In a match against the Newcastle Jets on 26 April 2021 at AAMI Park Western United played with the lowest attendance in A-League history with 990 people attending the match which was 13 less than the previous record of 1,003 in a match between North Queensland Fury and Brisbane Roar in the 2010–11 A-League season. In their last nine games from 30 April to 5 June 2021, Western United had the worst end to an A-League regular season with nine games in a row without a win starting with a draw and eight losses to follow with them finishing 10th in the 2020–21 ladder.

== Home stadium plans and first Championship (2021–22) ==
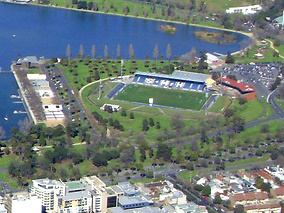
Lakeside Stadium was announced as Western United's home ground for seven matches of the 2021–22 season, but rejected by South Melbourne FC.

It was announced that the parent company of Western United were to begin construction on their new proposed home ground Wyndham City Stadium to be completed in 2021 on 25 October 2021 located in Tarneit (part of the south-western suburbs in Melbourne) to have a capacity of 15,000. When fixtures were announced for the 2021–22 A-League Men season, the Western Melbourne Group proposed a plan to South Melbourne FC to play seven of their home games at Lakeside Stadium (home of South Melbourne). The plan was rejected by South Melbourne FC on 24 September 2021 for reasons to Western United as having Lakeside Stadium and Albert Park as permanent home grounds for South Melbourne with their licensing arrangements to stay the same for decades. Although two out of four home games in 2021 were reported as Lakeside Stadium, it brought controversy and arguments from South Melbourne FC of letting Western United play seven of their home games for the 2021–22 season as the club's proposed home stadium is still not built yet. A week later, the fixtures to be played at Lakeside Stadium were moved to AAMI Park.

The club announced that the development plans for their new training facilities and stadium grandstand was approved. Eight days after the announcement, construction officially began on the new training facilities and stadium grandstand.

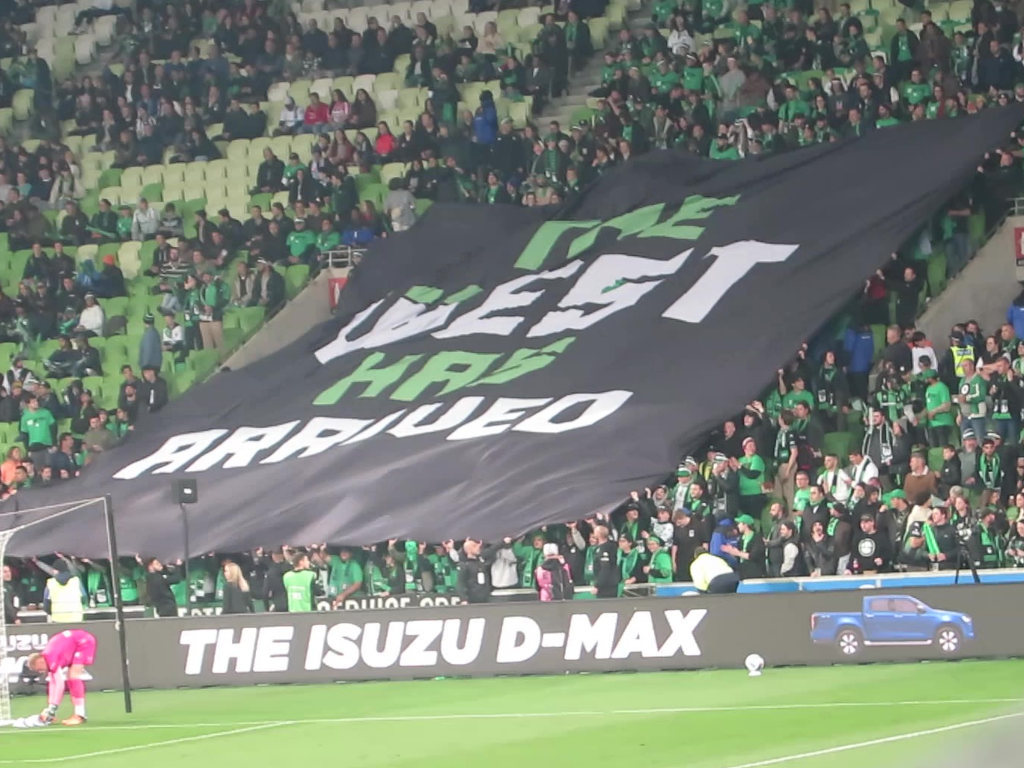
Western United fans holding up a banner reading "The West Has Arrived" at the 2022 A-League Men Grand Final

After not reaching the Finals series the previous season, Western United had finished 3rd in the regular season qualifying for the elimination-finals against Wellington Phoenix. The elimination-final match resulted in a 1–0 victory for Western United via an early goal for Aleksandar Prijović to send them to the two-legged semi-finals against rivals Melbourne Victory. The first leg was a 1–0 loss, but recovered to win 4–1 in the second leg to reach the Grand Final for the first time. The Grand Final was won by Western United, 2–0 over locals Melbourne City in front of over 22,000 spectators, winning the club's first trophy in their history.
