= Matthew Cream =

Australian football referee

- Full name: Matthew James Cream
- Born: 19 June 1975 (age 51); Adelaide, Australia

Domestic
Years	League	Role
2007–	A-League	Assistant referee

International
Years	League	Role
2000–2021	FIFA listed	Assistant referee

Matthew James Cream (born 19 June 1975) is an Australian football referee. He is the Referee Development Officer in South Australia.

Cream was a FIFA international assistant referee between 2000–2021. He accompanied Matthew Breeze and fellow assistant referee Ben Wilson to the 2009 FIFA Confederations Cup in South Africa. Cream was selected as an assistant referee for the 2012 London Olympic Games. Cream accompanied Ben Williams to the 2014 FIFA World Cup and 2014 FIFA Club World Cup. He also officiated at the 2015 AFC Asian Cup along with fellow Australian Paul Cetrangolo.

Cream has had numerous A-League Finals appointments in 2009, 2010, 2012, 2015, 2016, 2017, 2018 and 2021.
