= Joe Marston Medal =

Association football accolade

The Joe Marston Medal is an A-League Men award given to the player of the match in the A-League Men Grand Final each year. Introduced in 1990, previously the award was also given to the best player in the National Soccer League grand final. The medal is named after Joe Marston, who played for Australia national association football team in the 1950s and was a member of the Preston North End side that played in the 1954 FA Cup final.

== List of winners ==
Season/Year	Player	Club	Opponent	Ref
NSL				
1989–90	(Australia) Abbas Saad	Sydney Olympic	Marconi Stallions	
1990–91	(Australia) Josip Biskic (Note: Player on the losing team)	Melbourne Knights	South Melbourne	
1991–92	(Australia) Alex Tobin	Adelaide City	Melbourne Knights	
1992–93	(Australia) Milan Ivanovic	Adelaide City	Marconi Stallions	
1993–94	(Australia) Alex Tobin	Adelaide City	Melbourne Knights	
1995	(Australia) Steve Horvat	Melbourne Knights	Adelaide City	
1996	(Australia) Andrew Marth	Melbourne Knights	Marconi Stallions	
1997	(Australia) Alan Hunter	Brisbane Strikers	Sydney United	
1998	(Australia) Fausto De Amicis	South Melbourne	Carlton SC	
1999	(Australia) Goran Lozanovski	South Melbourne	Sydney United	
2000	(Australia) Scott Chipperfield	Wollongong Wolves	Perth Glory	
2001	(Australia) Matthew Horsley	Wollongong Wolves	South Melbourne	
2002	(Australia) Ante Milicic	Sydney Olympic	Perth Glory	
2003	(Australia) Simon Colosimo	Perth Glory	Sydney Olympic	
2004	(Australia) Ahmad Elrich	Parramatta Power	Perth Glory	
A-League
2006	(Trinidad and Tobago) Dwight Yorke	Sydney FC	Central Coast Mariners	
2007	(Australia) Archie Thompson	Melbourne Victory	Adelaide United	
2008	(Australia) Andrew Durante	Newcastle Jets	Central Coast Mariners	
2009	(Australia) Tom Pondeljak	Melbourne Victory	Adelaide United	
2010	(Australia) Simon Colosimo	Sydney FC	Melbourne Victory	
2011	(Australia) Mat Ryan	Central Coast Mariners	Brisbane Roar	
2012	(Australia) Jacob Burns	Perth Glory	Brisbane Roar	
2013	(Australia) Daniel McBreen	Central Coast Mariners	Western Sydney Wanderers	
2014	(Germany) Thomas Broich	Brisbane Roar	Western Sydney Wanderers	
2014	(Italy) Iacopo La Rocca	Western Sydney Wanderers	Brisbane Roar	
2015	(Australia) Mark Milligan	Melbourne Victory	Sydney FC	
2016	(Spain) Isaías	Adelaide United	Western Sydney Wanderers	
2017	(North Macedonia) Daniel Georgievski	Melbourne Victory	Sydney FC	
2018	(Australia) Lawrence Thomas	Melbourne Victory	Newcastle Jets	
2019	(Serbia) Miloš Ninković	Sydney FC	Perth Glory	
2020	(Australia) Rhyan Grant	Sydney FC	Melbourne City	
2021	(Australia) Nathaniel Atkinson	Melbourne City	Sydney FC	
A-League Men
2022	(Serbia) Aleksandar Prijović	Western United	Melbourne City	
2023	(Australia) Jason Cummings	Central Coast Mariners	Melbourne City	
2024	(England) Ryan Edmondson	Central Coast Mariners	Melbourne Victory	
2025	(Australia) Mathew Leckie	Melbourne City	Melbourne Victory	
2026	(New Zealand) Cameron Howieson	Auckland FC	Sydney FC	

== Multiple winners ==
Medals	Player	Team	Seasons
2	(Australia) Alex Tobin	Adelaide City	1991–92, 1993–94
2	(Australia) Simon Colosimo	Perth Glory / Sydney FC	2002–03, 2010

== See also ==
- John Kosmina Medal
- Johnny Warren Medal
- Mark Viduka Medal
- Michael Cockerill Medal
- Norm Smith Medal
- Clive Churchill Medal
