= 2022 A-League Men Grand Final =

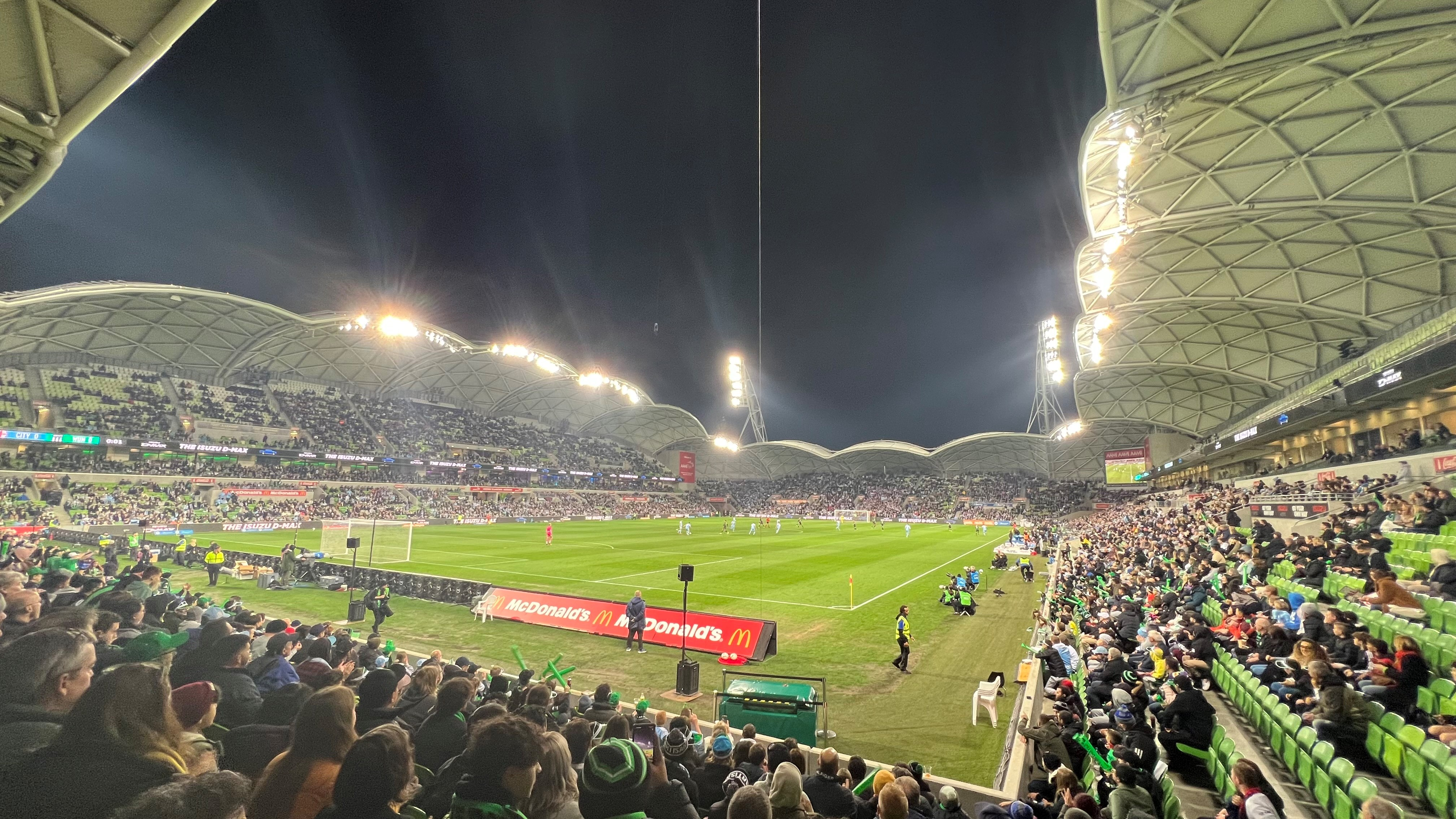
- AAMI Park in Melbourne hosted the Grand Final.
- Event: 2021–22 A-League Men
Melbourne City	Western United
0	2
- Date: 28 May 2022
- Venue: AAMI Park, Melbourne
- Joe Marston Medal: Aleksandar Prijović (Western United)
- Referee: Chris Beath
- Attendance: 22,495
- Weather: Clear; 8 °C (46 °F); 76% humidity

The 2022 A-League Men Grand Final was the 17th A-League Men Grand Final, the championship-deciding match of the Australian A-League Men and the culmination of the 2021–22 season. The match was played between season premiers and defending champions Melbourne City and Western United on 28 May 2022 at AAMI Park in Melbourne.

== Background ==
The match was Melbourne City's third consecutive and overall A-League Men Grand Final, while it was Western United's inaugural feature in the Grand Final. Western United won 2–0. This was the first A-League Grand Final to feature two teams of the same city, with both teams representing Melbourne. Western United's win saw the club became just the second expansion side ever to win the A-League Championship, the quickest expansion side to win it, the first team to triumph in their first Grand Final appearance since Brisbane Roar in 2011, and one of just two teams to have won the Championship after finishing outside the top two, with Melbourne Victory first achieving this feat in 2018.

=== Previous finals ===
In the following table, finals until 2004 were in the National Soccer League era, since 2006 were in the A-League era.

Team	Previous grand final appearances (bold indicates winners)
Melbourne City	2 (2020, **2021**)
Western United	None

== Route to the final ==
=== Summary ===
The 2021–22 season was the league's seventeenth since its inception in 2005, and the 45th season of top-flight association football in Australia. Twelve teams competed in the regular season, with each team playing a total of 26 matches, resulting in an uneven fixture that involved some clubs meeting three times and others meeting only twice. The top six teams qualified for the finals series, which were played in a straight-knockout format, with the top two teams earning an automatic place in the semi-finals and the bottom four teams playing off in elimination finals. One change made was that both semi-finals were now two-legged fixtures with the two winners of the semi-finals on aggregate meeting in the grand final. Melbourne City and Melbourne Victory qualified for the semi-finals by virtue of finishing first and second respectively, whilst Western United (third) met Wellington Phoenix (sixth) in the first elimination final and Adelaide United (fourth) took on Central Coast Mariners (fifth) in the second elimination final.

Melbourne City				Round	Western United			
**2021–22 A-League Men**; **1st placed / Premiers**: Pos / Team / Pld / Pts; **1** / Melbourne City / **26** / **49**; 2 / Melbourne Victory / 26 / **48**; 3 / Western United (C) / 26 / **45**; 4 / Adelaide United / 26 / **43**; 5 / Central Coast Mariners / 26 / **42**; Source: A-Leagues (C) Champions				Regular season	**2021–22 A-League Men**; **3rd placed**: Pos / Team / Pld / Pts; 1 / Melbourne City / 26 / **49**; 2 / Melbourne Victory / 26 / **48**; **3** / Western United (C) / **26** / **45**; 4 / Adelaide United / 26 / **43**; 5 / Central Coast Mariners / 26 / **42**; Source: A-Leagues (C) Champions			
Opponent	Score			Elimination-finals	Opponent	Score		
Bye				Elimination-finals	Wellington Phoenix	1–0 (H)		
Opponent	Agg.	1st leg	2nd leg	Semi-finals	Opponent	Agg.	1st leg	2nd leg
Adelaide United	2–1	0–0 (A)	2–1 (a.e.t.) (H)	Semi-finals	Melbourne Victory	4–2	0–1 (H)	4–1 (A)

=== Western United ===
Western United finished the season in 3rd place, where they played 6th placed Wellington Phoenix in the first elimination final, where they won 1–0 at AAMI Park in front of 3,376 fans. Western United then faced Melbourne Victory in the semi-final, who had finished the regular season in second place. After losing the home leg 0–1, Western United then mounted a comeback in the away leg, defeating Melbourne Victory 4–1 in front of 15,349 spectators, with the scoreline being 4–2 on aggregate, to progress to their first ever A-League Men Grand Final.

== Pre-match ==
=== Venue selection ===
The Grand Final was held at AAMI Park in Melbourne, the home ground of Melbourne City. This was the third Grand Final hosted at the venue, after 2015 and the previous edition in 2021.

=== Broadcasting ===
The Grand Final was broadcast throughout Australia live and free on Network 10 and streamed on Paramount+ and 10Play, the latter being for free.

=== Officiating ===
Chris Beath was selected to officiate the Grand Final on 25 May, which would be his third consecutive A-League Mens Grand Final. Beath was assisted by Anton Shchetinin and Ashley Beecham. The video match officials for the match were led by Kris Griffiths-Jones, who was assisted by Kate Jacewicz and Kearney Robinson. Daniel Elder was the fourth official for the match. Andrej Giev was the fifth official.

=== Attendance ===
The match was the first A-League Men Grand Final since 2019 that did not have the attendance impacted by COVID-19 restrictions. The match attendance of 22,495 was the third lowest Grand Final attendance, and the lowest attendance for a Grand Final that was not impacted by COVID-19 restrictions.

=== Entertainment ===
Young Franco, Tkay Maidza and Nerve performed before the start of the match and at half-time.

== Match ==
=== Details ===
28 May 2022
19:45 AEST (UTC+10:00)

Melbourne City	0–2	Western United
	Report	Reis 2' (o.g.); Prijović 30'

AAMI Park, Melbourne
Attendance: 22,495
Referee: Chris Beath

**Melbourne City**	**Western United**

GK	1	(Australia) Tom Glover
CB	4	(Portugal) Nuno Reis
CB	5	(Australia) Rostyn Griffiths	(substituted off) 66'
CB	22	(Australia) Curtis Good
RWB	6	(England) Carl Jenkinson	(substituted off) 46'
LWB	3	(Australia) Scott Jamieson (c)
RM	15	(Australia) Andrew Nabbout
CM	10	(France) Florin Berenguer
CM	18	(Australia) Connor Metcalfe	(substituted off) 78'
LM	7	(Australia) Mathew Leckie
CF	9	(Australia) Jamie Maclaren
Substitutes:
GK	33	(Australia) Matt Sutton
DF	2	(Australia) Scott Galloway	(substituted on) 46'
DF	38	(Australia) Jordan Bos
MF	14	(Japan) Tsubasa Endoh
MF	16	(Australia) Taras Gomulka	(substituted on) 78'
FW	17	(North Macedonia) Stefan Colakovski
FW	23	(Australia) Marco Tilio	(substituted on) 66'
Head coach:
(Australia) Patrick Kisnorbo

GK	1	(Australia) Jamie Young
RB	19	(Australia) Josh Risdon (c)
CB	6	(Japan) Tomoki Imai
CB	4	(Switzerland) Léo Lacroix
LB	17	(Australia) Ben Garuccio
CM	88	(Australia) Neil Kilkenny
CM	10	(Australia) Steven Lustica		(substituted off) 63'
RW	8	(Australia) Lachlan Wales	(yellow card) 84'	(substituted off) 89'
AM	9	(Australia) Dylan Wenzel-Halls	(yellow card) 65'	(substituted off) 89'
LW	11	(Australia) Connor Pain		(substituted off) 82'
CF	99	(Serbia) Aleksandar Prijović
Substitutes:
GK	37	(Australia) Ryan Scott
DF	5	(Australia) Dylan Pierias		(substituted on) 89'
DF	33	(Australia) Ben Collins
MF	26	(Australia) Nicolas Milanovic
MF	27	(Australia) Jerry Skotadis		(substituted on) 63'
MF	31	(Australia) Adisu Bayew		(substituted on) 82'
MF	42	(Australia) Rhys Bozinovski		(substituted on) 89'
Head coach:
(Australia) John Aloisi

Joe Marston Medal:
Aleksandar Prijović (Western United)

Assistant referees:
Anton Shchetinin
Ashley Beecham
Fourth official:
Daniel Elder
Fifth official:
Andrej Giev
Video assistant referee:
Kris Griffiths-Jones
Kate Jacewicz
Kearney Robinson

**Match rules**

- 90 minutes.
- 30 minutes of extra time if necessary.
- Penalty shoot-out if scores still level.
- Seven named substitutes.
- Maximum of four substitutions, with a fifth allowed in extra time.

=== Statistics ===
First half
Statistic	Melbourne City	Western United
Goals scored	0	2
Total shots	1	7
Shots on target	0	1
Saves	0	0
Ball possession	56%	44%
Corner kicks	2	1
Fouls committed	2	3
Offsides	1	0
Yellow cards	0	0
Red cards	0	0

Second half
Statistic	Melbourne City	Western United
Goals scored	0	0
Total shots	15	0
Shots on target	5	0
Saves	0	5
Ball possession	66%	34%
Corner kicks	7	0
Fouls committed	7	11
Offsides	1	0
Yellow cards	0	2
Red cards	0	0

Overall
Statistic	Melbourne City	Western United
Goals scored	0	2
Total shots	16	7
Shots on target	5	1
Saves	0	5
Ball possession	60%	40%
Corner kicks	9	1
Fouls committed	9	14
Offsides	2	0
Yellow cards	0	2
Red cards	0	0

== Post-match ==
Due to the Australian Professional Leagues announcing on 12 December 2022 that 2023, 2024 and 2025 A-League Men Grand Finals would be hosted in Sydney regardless of which two teams qualified, the 2022 Grand Final would have been the last Grand Final to be played outside of Sydney until at least 2026, but the deal was scrapped in October 2023.

== See also ==
- 2021–22 A-League Men
- 2021–22 Melbourne City FC season
- 2021–22 Western United FC season
