= Paul Cetrangolo =

Australian football referee

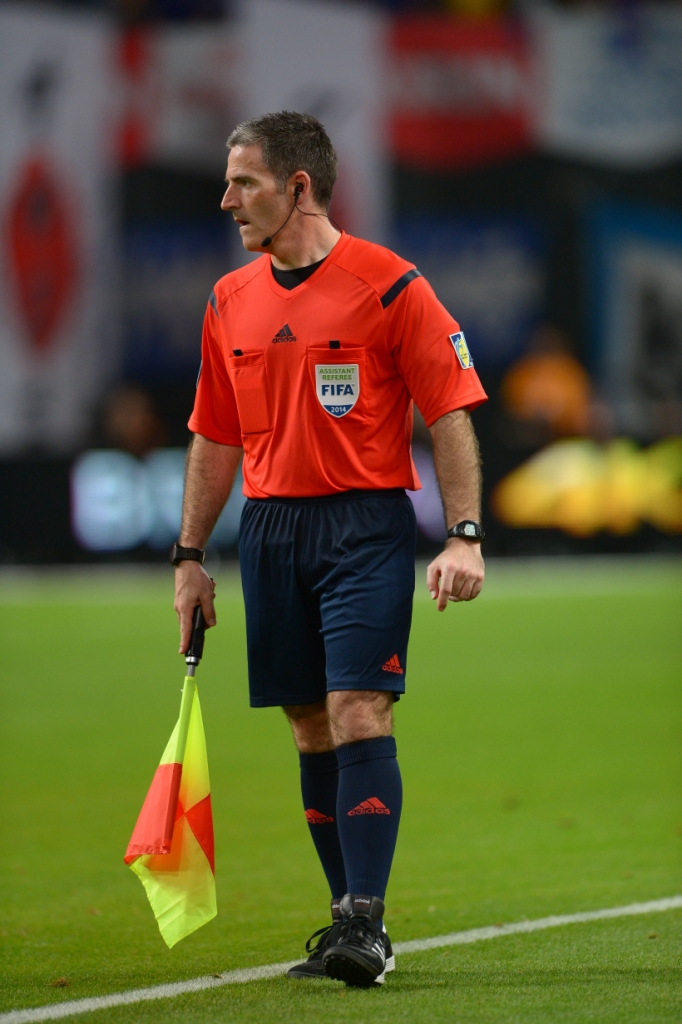
- Paul Cetrangolo officiating at a game in 2014
- Born: 29 June 1978 (age 48); Australia

Domestic
Years	League	Role
2000–2004	National Soccer League	Assistant referee
2005–2022	A-League	Assistant referee

International
Years	League	Role
2010–2018	FIFA listed	Assistant referee

Paul Cetrangolo (born 29 June 1978) is a retired Australian soccer referee.

Cetrangolo was a FIFA international assistant referee between 2010–2018. Cetrangolo accompanied Ben Williams to the 2014 FIFA Club World Cup and the 2015 AFC Asian Cup along with fellow Australian Matthew Cream. He has also officiated at the 2012 AFC Champions League Final. On 11 November 2022 he took the field as an assistant referee for the 173rd and final time in the Australian A League in the match between Adelaide United and Melbourne Victory as he announced his retirement from the Australian national leagues.

== Family ==
His wife is Antonietta Cetrangolo, to whom he is currently married with two children, Christian, and Oscar.
