= 2019 A-League Grand Final =

- Event: 2018–19 A-League
Perth Glory	Sydney FC
0	0
- After extra time Sydney FC won 4–1 on penalties
- Date: 19 May 2019
- Venue: Optus Stadium, Perth
- Man of the Match: Miloš Ninković (Sydney FC)
- Referee: Shaun Evans
- Attendance: 56,371
- Weather: Sunny and clear 19.9 °C (67.8 °F)

The 2019 A-League Grand Final was the fourteenth A-League Grand Final, the championship-deciding match of the A-League in Australia and the culmination of the 2018–19 season. It was played on the 19 May 2019 at Optus Stadium in Perth between Perth Glory and Sydney FC, who finished the regular season first and second respectively. This was the first A-League grand final hosted in Perth and it is the highest attended grand final in A-League history.

Sydney participated in their fifth grand final, winning three of the previous four played prior to this match. Perth participated in their sixth grand final overall and second in the A-League era, winning two of the previous five.

The match ended 0–0 after extra time, with Sydney winning 4–1 on penalties to secure their fourth A-League title.

== Teams ==
In the following table, finals until 2004 were in the National Soccer League era, since 2006 were in the A-League era.

Team	Previous final appearances (bold indicates winners)
Perth Glory	5 (2000, 2002, **2003**, **2004**, 2012)
Sydney FC	4 (**2006**, **2010**, 2015, **2017**)

== Route to the final ==
Elimination-finals
**Adelaide United** (a.e.t.)	**1**
Melbourne City	0
**Melbourne Victory**	**3**
Wellington Phoenix	1

Semi-finals
**Perth Glory** (pen.)	**3 (5)**
Adelaide United	3 (4)
**Sydney FC**	**6**
Melbourne Victory	1

Grand Final
Perth Glory	**0 (1)**
**Sydney FC** (pen.)	**0 (4)**

The A-League Grand Final is the grand final for the A-League, a professional club soccer league that is based in Australia and New Zealand. The 2018–19 season was the fourteenth season in history and also the 42nd of top-flight football in Australia. Each team played against each other three times throughout the season for a total of twenty seven matches. After the regular season, the top six teams qualified to play in the finals with the teams placed between third and sixth playing in week one of the finals while the top two teams got a week off. This meant that playing in the first week was, Adelaide United, Melbourne City, Melbourne Victory and Wellington Phoenix while Perth Glory and Sydney FC having the bye for the first week.

The grand final will be contested by Perth Glory and Sydney FC which respectively finished one and two after the regular season with Perth finishing ahead of Sydney by eight points. During the regular season, the two teams played three times with Sydney leading the head-to-head at two wins to one.

=== Perth Glory ===
During the pre-season, they acquired former Socceroos Tomislav Mrcela from Korean club Jeonnam Dragons, Matthew Spiranovic from Chinese club Zhejiang Greentown and Jason Davidson from Croatian side HNK Rijeka in what became a trio in the backline. In the opening game of the season, they drew with Western Sydney Wanderers 1–1 at home with Andy Keogh scoring the first goal for Perth in the 2018–19 season. After gaining win in Round 2 and 3, Perth went to the top of the table after knocking off Adelaide United with two goals in the second half from Andy Keogh and Chris Ikonomidis securing the victory.

=== Results ===
Perth Glory		Round	Sydney FC	
1st place: Pos / Team / Pld / Pts; **1** / Perth Glory / **27** / **60**; 2 / Sydney FC (C) / 27 / **52**; 3 / Melbourne Victory / 27 / **50**; 4 / Adelaide United / 27 / **44**; 5 / Melbourne City / 27 / **40**; Source: A-Leagues (C) Champions		Regular season	2nd place: Pos / Team / Pld / Pts; 1 / Perth Glory / 27 / **60**; **2** / Sydney FC (C) / **27** / **52**; 3 / Melbourne Victory / 27 / **50**; 4 / Adelaide United / 27 / **44**; 5 / Melbourne City / 27 / **40**; Source: A-Leagues (C) Champions	
Opponent	Score		Opponent	Score
Bye week	NA	Elimination Finals	Bye week	NA
Adelaide United	3–3 (5-4 on pen.)	Semifinals	Melbourne Victory	6–1

== Pre-match ==
=== Venue ===
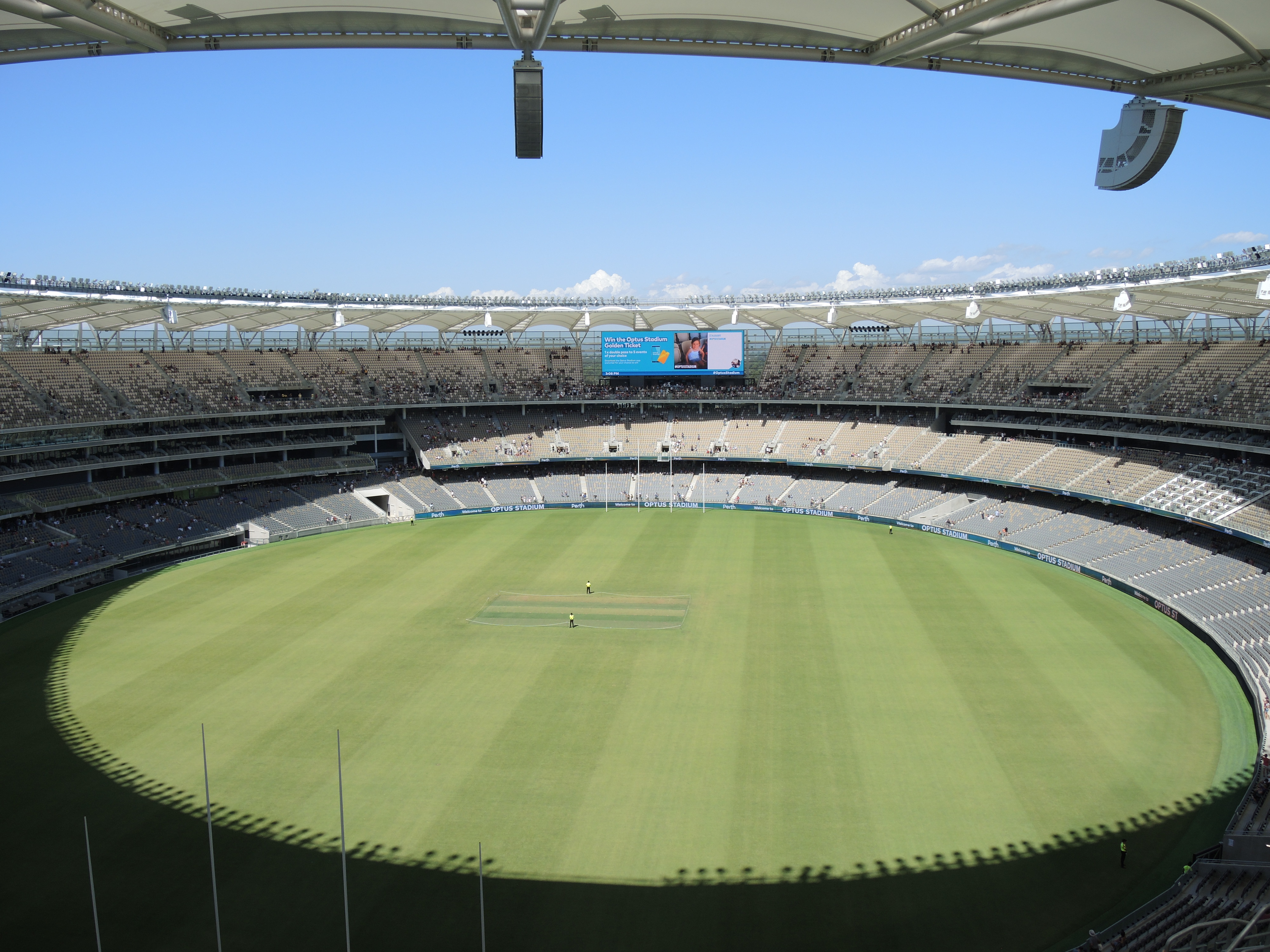
Perth Stadium in Perth hosted the 2019 A-League Grand Final

The Grand Final was held at Optus Stadium in Perth, and was the second time that a major soccer match was held at the stadium, after the friendly between Perth Glory and Chelsea on 23 July 2018. The stadium is mainly used as an Australian rules football ground for the West Coast Eagles and the Fremantle Dockers in the Australian Football League in the winter months, while in the summer it's used for cricket for the Perth Scorchers and occasionally the Australia national cricket team.

=== Ticket details ===
Ticket sales started on the Monday prior to the event. In the first few hours over 35,000 tickets had been sold, of which 20,000 were from club members. Two days later tickets went on sale to the general public.

== Match ==
=== Summary ===
The match started at 4:45pm AWST in Perth with Shaun Evans, recipient of the A-League Referee of the Year, as the referee. The match was his first A-League Grand Final.

=== Details ===
19 May 2019
16:45 AWST

Perth Glory	0–0 (a.e.t.)	Sydney FC
Penalties
Juande (penalty scored); Keogh (penalty missed); Santalab (penalty missed)	1–4	(penalty scored) Le Fondre; (penalty scored) O'Neill; (penalty scored) Grant; (penalty scored) Ghoochannejhad

Optus Stadium, Perth
Attendance: 56,371
Referee: Shaun Evans

**Perth Glory**	**Sydney FC**

GK	33	(Australia) Liam Reddy
CB	6	(Australia) Dino Djulbic	(yellow card) 116'
CB	13	(Australia) Matthew Spiranovic
CB	4	(Australia) Shane Lowry	(yellow card) 23'
RM	5	(Australia) Ivan Franjic		(substituted off) 90'
CM	88	(Australia) Neil Kilkenny	(yellow card) 69'	(substituted off) 105'
CM	27	(Spain) Juande	(yellow card) 90+1'
LM	3	(Australia) Jason Davidson
RF	7	(Australia) Joel Chianese		(substituted off) 73'
CF	17	(Spain) Diego Castro
LF	19	(Australia) Chris Ikonomidis		(substituted off) 115'
Substitutes:
GK	1	(Australia) Tando Velaphi
DF	23	(Australia) Scott Neville		(substituted on) 90'
MF	20	(Australia) Jake Brimmer		(substituted on) 105'
FW	9	(Republic of Ireland) Andy Keogh		(substituted on) 73'
FW	11	(Australia) Brendon Santalab		(substituted on) 115'
Manager: (Australia) Tony Popovic

GK	1	(Australia) Andrew Redmayne
RB	23	(Australia) Rhyan Grant	(yellow card) 88'
CB	4	(Australia) Alex Wilkinson
CB	2	(Australia) Aaron Calver
LB	7	(Australia) Michael Zullo
AM	22	(Netherlands) Siem de Jong	(yellow card) 55'	(substituted off) 78'
DM	6	(Australia) Joshua Brillante
DM	13	(Australia) Brandon O'Neill
AM	10	(Serbia) Miloš Ninković
CF	14	(Australia) Alex Brosque		(substituted off) 95'
CF	9	(England) Adam Le Fondre
Substitutes:
GK	20	(Australia) Alex Cisak
MF	8	(Australia) Paulo Retre
MF	11	(Australia) Daniel De Silva
MF	17	(Australia) Anthony Cáceres		(substituted on) 78'
FW	16	(Iran) Reza Ghoochannejhad		(substituted on) 95'
Manager: (Australia) Steve Corica			(yellow card) 31'

Joe Marston Medal:
Miloš Ninković (Sydney FC)

Assistant referees:
Andrew Lindsay
Paul Cetrangolo
Fourth official:
Chris Beath

**Match rules**

- 90 minutes.
- 30 minutes of extra time if necessary.
- Penalty shoot-out if scores still level.
- Five named substitutes.
- Maximum of three substitutions.

=== Statistics ===
Overall statistics
	Perth Glory	Sydney FC
Goals scored	0	0
Total shots	10	3
Shots on target	2	0
Ball possession	59%	41%
Corner kicks	8	2
Fouls Conceded	16	19
Offsides	2	4
Yellow cards	4	2
Red cards	0	0

== Broadcasting ==
The Grand Final was broadcast live throughout Australia on Fox Sports and Network Ten. The radio rights for the grand final was held by ABC with their grandstand coverage of the game.

== See also ==
- 2018–19 A-League
- List of A-League honours
