= 2020 A-League Grand Final =

- Event: 2019–20 A-League
Sydney FC	Melbourne City
1	0
- Date: 30 August 2020
- Venue: Bankwest Stadium, Sydney
- Joe Marston Medal: Rhyan Grant
- Referee: Chris Beath
- Attendance: 7,051

The 2020 A-League Grand Final was the fifteenth A-League Grand Final, the championship-deciding match of the Australian A-League and the culmination of the 2019–20 season. The match was originally scheduled to be played in May 2020 but was postponed due to the COVID-19 pandemic, and was played on 30 August 2020 between Sydney FC and Melbourne City at Bankwest Stadium in the western Sydney suburb of Parramatta, New South Wales.

Sydney FC defeated Melbourne City, who were appearing in their first Grand Final, by 1 goal to nil. The win meant Sydney claimed their fifth A-League championship, a record number for any club in Australian domestic league football.

== Teams ==
In the following table, finals until 2004 were in the National Soccer League era, since 2006 were in the A-League era.

Team	Previous final appearances (bold indicates winners)
Sydney FC	5 (**2006**, **2010**, 2015, **2017**, **2019**)
Melbourne City	None

== Route to the final ==
The 2019–20 season was the league's fifteenth since its inception in 2005, and the 43rd season of top-flight association football in Australia. Eleven teams competed in the regular season, with each team playing a total of 26 matches, resulting in an uneven fixture that involved some clubs meeting three times and others meeting only twice. The top six teams qualified for the finals series, which were played in a straight-knockout format, with the top two teams earning an automatic place in the semi-finals and the bottom four teams playing off in elimination finals. The two winners of the semi-finals met in the grand final. Sydney FC and Melbourne City qualified for the semi-finals by virtue of finishing first and second respectively, whilst Wellington Phoenix (third) met Perth Glory (sixth) in the first elimination final and Brisbane Roar (fourth) took on Western United (fifth) in the second elimination final. Perth and Western United won their respective matches by one goal to nil. As the top-ranked team Sydney FC were paired with and defeated Perth, the lowest-ranked winning team, for their semi-final, whilst Melbourne City were victorious against Western United in the other semi-final.

Due to travel restrictions imposed as a result of the COVID-19 pandemic, all finals matches and the grand final were played at Bankwest Stadium in New South Wales.

Sydney FC		Round	Melbourne City	
1st place: Pos / Team / Pld / Pts; **1** / Sydney FC (C) / **26** / **53**; 2 / Melbourne City / 26 / **47**; 3 / Wellington Phoenix / 26 / **41**; 4 / Brisbane Roar / 26 / **40**; 5 / Western United / 26 / **39**; Source: A-Leagues (C) Champions		Regular season	2nd place: Pos / Team / Pld / Pts; 1 / Sydney FC (C) / 26 / **53**; **2** / Melbourne City / **26** / **47**; 3 / Wellington Phoenix / 26 / **41**; 4 / Brisbane Roar / 26 / **40**; 5 / Western United / 26 / **39**; Source: A-Leagues (C) Champions	
Opponent	Score		Opponent	Score
Bye week	N/A	Elimination finals	Bye week	N/A
Perth Glory	2–0	Semi-finals	Western United	2–0

== Pre-match ==
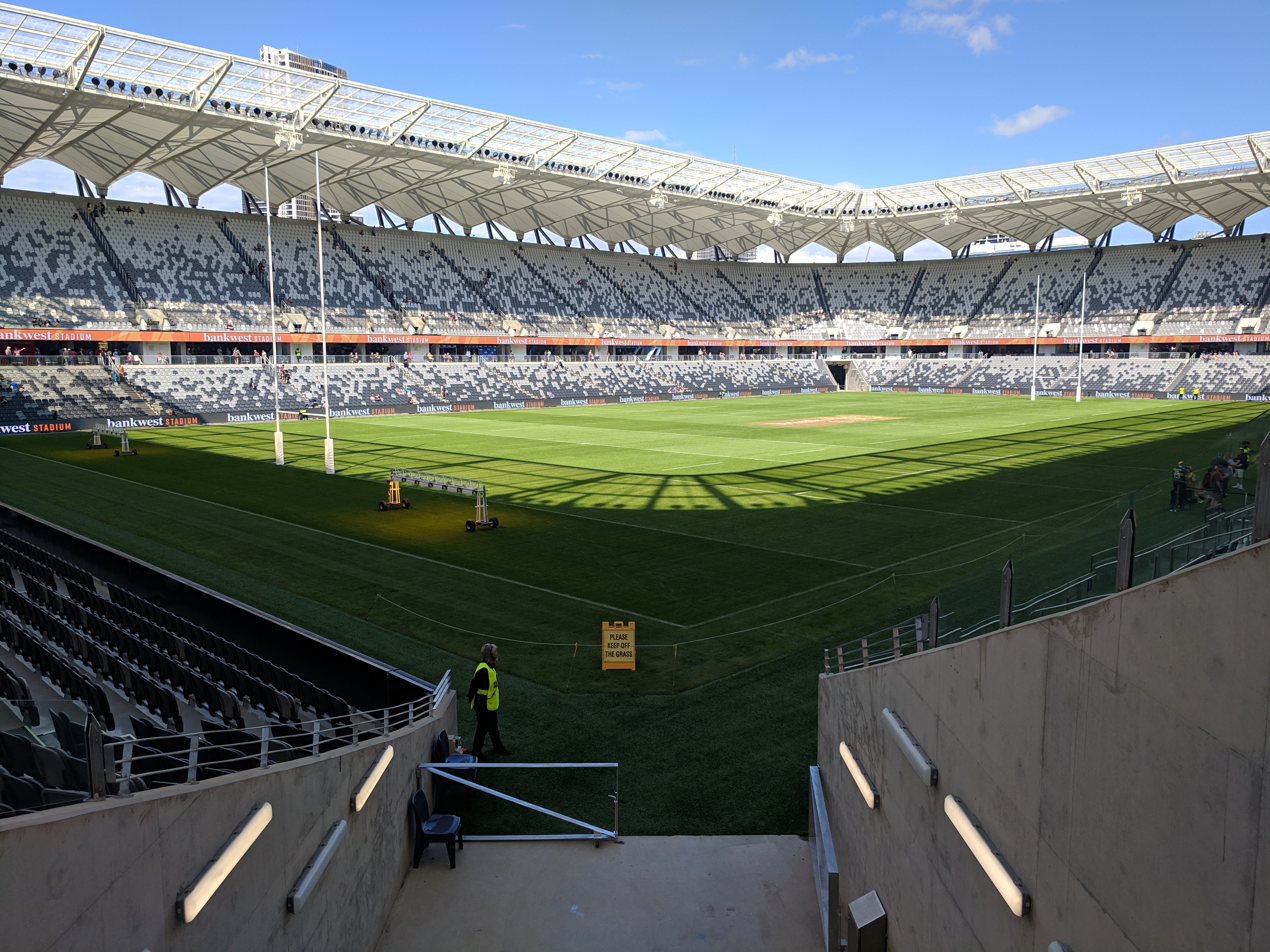
Bankwest Stadium in Sydney hosted the Grand Final

=== Venue ===
The Grand Final was held at Bankwest Stadium, Sydney, New South Wales. It was the first Grand Final held at the venue.

=== Attendance ===
Most A-League matches played after the season's resumption in mid-July were played behind closed doors, with others played before limited crowds in size due to COVID-19 restrictions imposed on sporting events by the New South Wales Government. A limited number of people were permitted into Bankwest Stadium for the Grand Final.

== Match ==
=== Summary ===
The match started with Melbourne City attacking repeatedly, with five shots in the first ten minutes, including many close chances. They nearly scored the first goal in the eighteenth minute with a Harrison Delbridge strike, however the video assistant referee (VAR) ruled that Lachlan Wales, who was in an offside position, obstructed the sight of Sydney FC's goalkeeper Andrew Redmayne, meaning that the goal would not stand. Soon after, Sydney FC's Adam Le Fondre was seen to have been pulled down in the box by City's Curtis Good, however penalty shouts were ignored by referee Chris Beath and the VAR asserted this assessment. As the game progressed, Sydney eased into it however both teams still had a plethora of attacking opportunities, none of which were able to settle the result inside regular time due to exemplary showings from both Redmayne and City goalkeeper Tom Glover. The deadlock was eventually broken when Rhyan Grant of Sydney FC managed to rebound the ball of his chest and into the goal off a pass from Luke Brattan in the 100th minute. Controversially, Grant then covered his face with his shirt, an offence that the laws of the game require to be punished with a yellow card, one that would have seen him sent off for a second bookable offence. After the game the referees boss Strebre Delovski stated that doing so would have been "very harsh" as the reason for not doing so. More chances came and went however the match ended 1–0, with the regular season premiers prevailing for the fifth time, the most championships of any side in the history of Australia's top flight. Meanwhile, the Joe Marston Medal was awarded to the only goalscorer on the night, Rhyan Grant.

=== Details ===
30 August 2020
18:30 AEST

Sydney FC	1–0 (a.e.t.)	Melbourne City
Grant 100'	Report

Bankwest Stadium, Sydney
Attendance: 7,051
Referee: Chris Beath

**Sydney FC**	**Melbourne City**

GK	1	(Australia) Andrew Redmayne
RB	23	(Australia) Rhyan Grant	(yellow card) 97'
CB	4	(Australia) Alex Wilkinson (c)
CB	6	(Australia) Ryan McGowan
LB	16	(Australia) Joel King
RM	17	(Australia) Anthony Caceres		(substituted off) 87'
MF	8	(Australia) Paulo Retre	(yellow card) 53'
MF	26	(Australia) Luke Brattan
LM	10	(Serbia) Milos Ninkovic
CF	11	(New Zealand) Kosta Barbarouses		(substituted off) 87'
CF	26	(England) Adam Le Fondre
Substitutes:
GK	20	(Australia) Thomas Heward-Belle
DF	3	(Australia) Ben Warland
DF	21	(Australia) Harry Van Der Saag
MF	5	(Germany) Alexander Baumjohann		(substituted on) 87'
MF	19	(Australia) Chris Zuvela
FW	12	(Australia) Trent Buhagiar		(substituted on) 87'
FW	18	(Australia) Luke Ivanovic
Head coach:
(Australia) Steve Corica

GK	1	(Australia) Tom Glover
RB	4	(Australia) Harrison Delbridge		(substituted off) 72'
DF	40	(Austria) Richard Windbichler	(yellow card) 103'	(substituted off) 116'
DF	22	(Australia) Curtis Good
LB	13	(Australia) Nathaniel Atkinson	(yellow card) 117'
MF	20	(Uruguay) Adrián Luna		(substituted off) 106'
MF	6	(Australia) Joshua Brillante (c)
MF	8	(France) Florin Berenguer		(substituted off) 77'
RW	19	(Australia) Lachlan Wales		(substituted off) 86'
FW	9	(Australia) Jamie Maclaren
LW	11	(England) Craig Noone		(substituted off) 106'
Substitutes:
GK	46	(Australia) Joe Gauci
DF	2	(Australia) Scott Galloway		(substituted on) 72'
MF	7	(Australia) Rostyn Griffiths		(substituted on) 116'
MF	21	(Australia) Ramy Najjarine		(substituted on) 86'
MF	30	(Australia) Moudi Najjar		(substituted on) 106'
MF	34	(Australia) Connor Metcalfe		(substituted on) 77'
FW	49	(Australia) Stefan Colakovski		(substituted on) 106'
Head coach:
(France) Erick Mombaerts

Joe Marston Medal:
Rhyan Grant (Sydney FC)

Assistant referees:
Scott Edeling
Kearney Robinson
Fourth official:
Alex King
Fifth official:
Ryan Gallagher
Video assistant referee:
Kris Griffiths-Jones

**Match rules**

- 90 minutes.
- 30 minutes of extra time if necessary.
- Penalty shoot-out if scores still level.
- Seven named substitutes.
- Maximum of five substitutions, and one additional substitute if extra time is played.

=== Statistics ===
Overall statistics
	Sydney FC	Melbourne City
Goals scored	1	0
Total shots	15	20
Shots on target	10	8
Ball possession	48.1%	51.9%
Corner kicks	7	9
Fouls conceded	18	19
Offsides	1	1
Yellow cards	2	2
Red cards	0	0

== Broadcasting ==
The Grand Final was broadcast throughout Australia live on Fox Sports and delayed on ABC Me. The radio rights for the match were held by ABC Radio Grandstand as well as SEN & SWR Triple 9 FM.

It was also shown on ESPN+ in the United States, as a simulcast of the Fox Sports broadcast.

== See also ==
- 2019–20 A-League
- List of A-League honours
