= 2006 A-League Grand Final =

- Event: 2005–06 A-League
Sydney FC	Central Coast Mariners
1	0
- Date: 5 March 2006
- Venue: Sydney Football Stadium, Sydney, New South Wales, Australia
- Man of the Match: Dwight Yorke (Sydney)
- Referee: Mark Shield
- Attendance: 41,689

The 2006 A-League Grand Final, the first edition of the A-League grand final was played between Sydney FC and Central Coast Mariners to decide the champion of the 2005–06 season. The Grand Final took place at Sydney Football Stadium in Sydney on 5 March 2006 after Sydney FC won the ground advantage after defeating Adelaide United in the major semi-final.

In the Grand Final, a goal from Steve Corica in the second half secured the premiership for Sydney. As the winners of the Grand Final, Sydney qualified through to the 2007 AFC Champions League joining Adelaide United who were the minor premiers.

== Road to the final ==
Semifinals
Adelaide United	2	1
Sydney FC	2	2
Central Coast Mariners	1	1
Newcastle Jets	0	1

Preliminary final
Adelaide United	0
Central Coast Mariners	1

Final
Sydney FC	1
Central Coast Mariners	0

== Match ==
=== Details ===
5 March 2006
17:00 AEDT

Sydney FC	1–0	Central Coast Mariners
Corica 62'	Reports

Sydney Football Stadium, Sydney
Attendance: 41,689
Referee: Mark Shield

Sydney FC	Central Coast Mariners

GK	1	(Australia) Clint Bolton
DF	3	(Australia) Alvin Ceccoli
DF	4	(Australia) Mark Rudan	(substituted off) 72'
DF	8	(Australia) Matthew Bingley
MF	10	(Australia) Steve Corica
FW	11	(Australia) Sasho Petrovski	(substituted off) 90'
MF	12	(Australia) David Carney
MF	14	(Australia) Andrew Packer
MF	15	(Northern Ireland) Terry McFlynn
DF	17	(Australia) Jacob Timpano	(substituted off) 81'
FW	19	(Trinidad and Tobago) Dwight Yorke (c)
Substitutes:
GK	20	(Australia) Justin Pasfield
DF	2	(Australia) Iain Fyfe	(substituted on) 72'
MF	7	(Australia) Robbie Middleby	(substituted on) 90'
FW	23	(Australia) Ruben Zadkovich	(substituted on) 81'
FW	24	(Australia) Tolgay Ozbey
Manager:
(Germany) Pierre Littbarski

GK	20	(Australia) Danny Vukovic
DF	2	(Republic of Ireland) Wayne O'Sullivan
MF	4	(Australia) Noel Spencer (c)	(yellow card) 57'
DF	5	(Australia) Michael Beauchamp
MF	6	(Germany) Andre Gumprecht
DF	8	(Australia) Dean Heffernan
MF	10	(Australia) Tom Pondeljak
MF	11	(Australia) Damien Brown		(substituted off) 68'
FW	12	(Scotland) Stewart Petrie		(substituted off) 73'
FW	15	(Australia) Andrew Clark
DF	18	(Australia) Alex Wilkinson		(substituted off) 84'
Substitutes:
GK	30	(Australia) Matthew Trott
DF	3	(Australia) Paul O'Grady		(substituted on) 84'
DF	17	(Australia) Matthew Osman		(substituted on) 68'
MF	22	(Australia) Jamie McMaster
FW	19	(Australia) Adam Kwasnik		(substituted on) 73'
Manager:
(Scotland) Lawrie McKinna

Joe Marston Medal:
Dwight Yorke (Sydney FC)

Assistant referees:
Fourth official:

Match rules

- 90 minutes
- 30 minutes of extra time if necessary.
- Penalty shoot-out if scores still level.

A-League
2006 Champions

Sydney FC
First Title

=== Statistics ===
	Sydney	Central Coast
Attempts at goal	15	15
Attempts on target	6	5
Attempts off target	9	10
Attempts - Woodwork	0	0
Keeper saves	4	3
Ball possession	50%	50%
Corners	4	9
Fouls committed	20	16
Offsides	4	3
Yellow cards	0	1
Red cards	0	0

== See also ==
- 2005–06 A-League
- List of A-League honours
