= 2017 A-League Grand Final =

- Event: 2016–17 A-League
Sydney FC	Melbourne Victory
1	1
- After extra time Sydney FC won 4–2 on penalties
- Date: 7 May 2017
- Venue: Allianz Stadium, Sydney
- Man of the Match: Daniel Georgievski
- Referee: Jarred Gillett
- Attendance: 41,546
- Weather: Clear; 18 °C (64 °F)

The 2017 A-League Grand Final was the twelfth A-League Grand Final, and was played on 7 May 2017, at Allianz Stadium in Sydney. The match was contested between Sydney FC and Melbourne Victory who finished the 2016–17 season first and second respectively. This was the third time the teams met in a final, previously playing each other in 2010 and 2015. Both clubs qualified for the 2018 AFC Champions League due to their league position and participation in the Grand Final.

Sydney FC won the match, defeating Melbourne Victory 4–2 on penalties after the match finished 1–1 after extra time. This marked the third occasion Sydney FC had won an A-League Championship.

== Teams ==
In the following table, finals until 2004 were in the National Soccer League era, since 2006 were in the A-League era.

Team	Previous final appearances (bold indicates winners)
Sydney FC	3 (**2006**, **2010**, 2015)
Melbourne Victory	4 (**2007**, **2009**, 2010, **2015**)

== Route to the final ==
Pos	Team	Pts
1	Sydney FC	66
2	Melbourne Victory	49
3	Brisbane Roar	42
4	Melbourne City	39
5	Perth Glory	39
6	Western Sydney Wanderers	36

Elimination-finals
Melbourne City	0
**Perth Glory**	**2**
**Brisbane Roar** (p)	**1 (6)**
Western Sydney Wanderers	1 (5)

Semi-finals
**Sydney FC**	**3**
Perth Glory	0
**Melbourne Victory**	**1**
Brisbane Roar	0

Grand Final
**Sydney FC** (p)	**1 (4)**
Melbourne Victory	1 (2)

== Match ==
=== Details ===
7 May 2017
17:20 AEDT

Sydney FC	1–1 (a.e.t.)	Melbourne Victory
Grant 69'	Reports	Berisha 20'
Penalties
Brosque (penalty scored); Wilkinson (penalty missed); Carney (penalty scored); O'Neill (penalty scored); Ninković (penalty scored)	4–2	(penalty scored) Troisi; (penalty scored) Broxham; (penalty missed) Valeri; (penalty missed) Rojas

Allianz Stadium, Sydney
Attendance: 41,546
Referee: Jarred Gillett

**Sydney FC**	**Melbourne Victory**

GK	20	(Australia) Danny Vukovic
RB	23	(Australia) Rhyan Grant
CB	4	(Australia) Alex Wilkinson
CB	5	(Netherlands) Jordy Buijs		(substituted off) 116'
LB	7	(Australia) Michael Zullo	(yellow card) 105+3'
CDM	6	(Australia) Josh Brillante	(yellow card) 44'
CDM	13	(Australia) Brandon O'Neill
CAM	21	(Slovakia) Filip Hološko	(yellow card) 36'	(substituted off) 59'
CAM	10	(Serbia) Miloš Ninković	(yellow card) 35'
CAM	14	(Australia) Alex Brosque
CF	9	(Brazil) Bobô		(substituted off) 81'
Substitutes:
GK	1	(Australia) Andrew Redmayne
DF	22	(Australia) Sebastian Ryall		(substituted on) 116'
MF	8	(Serbia) Miloš Dimitrijević
MF	17	(Australia) David Carney	(yellow card) 82'	(substituted on) 59'
FW	18	(Australia) Matt Simon		(substituted on) 81'
Manager: (Australia) Graham Arnold

GK	20	(Australia) Lawrence Thomas
RB	2	(Australia) Jason Geria	(yellow card) 77'
CB	15	(Spain) Alan Baró	(yellow card) 62'
CB	17	(Australia) James Donachie
LB	5	(North Macedonia) Daniel Georgievski
CM	6	(Australia) Leigh Broxham
CM	21	(Australia) Carl Valeri	(yellow card) 54'
CM	10	(Australia) James Troisi	(yellow card) 35'
RW	7	(New Zealand) Marco Rojas
CF	8	(Kosovo) Besart Berisha
LW	14	(Tunisia) Fahid Ben Khalfallah	(yellow card) 22' (substituted off) 101'
Substitutes:
GK	40	(Australia) Matt Acton
DF	4	(Australia) Nick Ansell
MF	11	(Australia) Mitch Austin
MF	16	(Australia) Rashid Mahazi
MF	23	(New Zealand) Jai Ingham	(yellow card) 108' (substituted on) 101'
Manager: (Australia) Kevin Muscat

Joe Marston Medal:
Daniel Georgievski

Assistant referees:
David Walsh
Matthew Cream
Fourth official:
Peter Green

**Match rules**

- 90 minutes.
- 30 minutes of extra time if necessary.
- Penalty shoot-out if scores still level.
- Five named substitutes.
- Maximum of three substitutions.

=== Statistics ===
Overall statistics
	Sydney FC	Melbourne Victory
Goals scored	1	1
Total shots	10	10
Shots on target	4	3
Ball possession	55%	45%
Corner kicks	5	5
Fouls Conceded	28	32
Offsides	2	5
Yellow cards	5	6
Red cards	0	0

== Broadcasting ==
As with the previous season, the 2017 A-League Grand Final was broadcast in Australia on Foxtel and on free-to-air TV, with SBS showing the game on a one-hour delay. The 2017 Grand Final was the most watched A-League match on Fox Sports ever, with an average of 367,000 viewers and a peak of 553,000. This number was a 10% increase on the previous highest A-League match, the 2014 Grand Final between Brisbane Roar and Western Sydney Wanderers.

== See also ==
- 2016–17 A-League
- List of A-League honours
