= 2006–07 Central Coast Mariners FC season =

Central Coast Mariners FC
2006–07 season
- Manager: Lawrie McKinna
- A-League: 6th
- A-League Pre-Season Challenge Cup: Runners-up
- Top goalscorer: League: Adam Kwasnik (7); All: Adam Kwasnik (9)
- Highest home attendance: 13,119 (vs Adelaide United, 25 November 2006)
- Lowest home attendance: 4,644 (vs Queensland Roar, 9 September 2006)

The 2006–07 season was the second season of competitive football played by Central Coast Mariners. The club ended the 2006–07 A-League in sixth, and so did not qualify for the finals. They failed to retain their A-League Pre-Season Challenge Cup title, losing to Adelaide United in the final.

In the transfer window, Central Coast signed Australian international Tony Vidmar and defender Vuko Tomasevic. The short term contracts of Brad Porter and Jamie McMaster were also extended.

The Mariners began the season in good form and reached the final of the 2006 A-League Pre-Season Challenge Cup. However, they failed to retain the title after losing in a penalty shoot-out to Adelaide United. The team were winless for the first five games of the A-League season, before a resurgent period featuring only two losses, to Adelaide Newcastle Jets in eleven games. However, the team failed to win any of its final five games and missed the finals series by five points as a result. Central Coast's top goalscorer was Adam Kwasnik, who scored nine goals.

== Background ==
=== Transfers ===
On the back of the Mariners' highly successful first season, expectation arose as to the big-name players that could potentially join Central Coast. There were strong rumours about Stan Lazaridis, Ned Zelic and Paul Okon coming to the Mariners, but none eventuated. However, on 3 August 2006 Tony Vidmar announced he was joining the Mariners, signing a two-year deal. Vidmar was the Mariners' first marquee signing.

In

No.	Position	Player	Transferred from	Transfer type	Date	Ref
14	DF	(Australia) Vuko Tomasevic	(Australia) Marconi Stallions	Free transfer	4 July 2006	
13	DF	(Australia) Tony Vidmar	Unattached	Free transfer	4 August 2006	
30	GK	(Australia) Matthew Trott	(Australia) Central Coast Lightning	Injury replacement deal for John Crawley	10 July 2006	
	FW	(Australia) James Holland	(Australia) NSWIS	Short term contract	12 July 2006	
	MF	(Australia) Oliver Bozanic	(Australia) NSWIS	Short term contract	20 July 2006	
	MF	(Australia) Mile Jedinak	(Australia) Sydney United	Short term contract	5 August 2006	
	FW	(Australia) Matt Simon	(Australia) Central Coast Lightning	Short term contract	10 August 2006	
	FW	(Australia) Damian Mori	(Australia) Adelaide City	Injury replacement deal for Nik Mrdja	27 September 2006	

Out

No.	Position	Player	Transferred to	Transfer type	Date	Ref
14	MF	(Australia) Leo Carle	Unattached	Free transfer	2 May 2006	
13	FW	(Australia) Russell Woodruffe	Unattached	Free transfer	2 May 2006	
	FW	(Australia) Damian Mori	(Australia) Brisbane Roar	Free transfer	22 November 2006	

== Pre-season ==
The Mariners competed in the QNI North Queensland Trophy against A-League club Melbourne Victory, Chinese Super League team Changchun Yatai and the Young Socceroos finishing a respectable third.

The Mariners also played two friendly matches prior to the season commencing.

8 June 2006	Gladesville Spirit	1–4	Central Coast Mariners	Sydney
	Ciano 42'	Report	Petrie 20'; Kwasnik 36', 44', 51'

17 June 2006 QNI North Queensland Trophy	Central Coast Mariners	2–2 (4–2 p)	Melbourne Victory
	Pondeljak 40'; Petrie 52'	Report	Allsopp 65'; Brebner 90'	Attendance: 3,000
	Penalties
			Fred (penalty scored); Claudinho; Byrnes (penalty scored); Allsopp (penalty missed); Brebner (penalty scored)

20 June 2006 QNI North Queensland Trophy	Australia U20	0–3	Central Coast Mariners	Townsville
		Report	Porter; McMaster; O'Grady	Stadium: Townsville Sports Reserve

22 June 2006 QNI North Queensland Trophy	Central Coast Mariners	1–2	Changchun Yatai
	Kwasnik 87'	Report

24 June 2006 QNI North Queensland Trophy	Australia U20	1–2	Central Coast Mariners
		Report

28 June 2006 Central Coast Football Charity Plate	Central Coast Lightning	0–2	Central Coast Mariners	Lisarow
19:00		Report	Kwasnik 30'; Brown 57'	Stadium: Pluim Park; Attendance: 1,900

== Squad ==
Note: Flags indicate national team as defined under FIFA eligibility rules; some limited exceptions apply. Players may hold more than one non-FIFA nationality.

No.	Pos.	Nation	Player
1	GK	AUS	John Crawley
2	MF	IRL	Wayne O'Sullivan
3	DF	AUS	Paul O'Grady
4	MF	AUS	Noel Spencer (captain)
5	MF	AUS	Brad Porter
6	MF	GER	André Gumprecht
7	MF	MLT	John Hutchinson
8	MF	ENG	Jamie McMaster
9	FW	AUS	Nick Mrdja
10	MF	AUS	Tom Pondeljak
11	MF	AUS	Damien Brown
12	FW	SCO	Stewart Petrie
13	DF	AUS	Tony Vidmar

No.	Pos.	Nation	Player
14	DF	AUS	Vuko Tomasevic
15	DF	AUS	Andrew Clark
16	DF	AUS	Nigel Boogaard
17	MF	AUS	Matthew Osman
18	DF	AUS	Alex Wilkinson
19	FW	AUS	Adam Kwasnik
20	GK	AUS	Danny Vukovic
21	FW	AUS	James Holland Short term deal 15/07/06-19/08/06
22	MF	AUS	Oliver Bozanic Short term deal 22/07/06-19/08/06
23	MF	AUS	Mile Jedinak Short term deals 12/08/06, 12/11/06-11/01/07
24	FW	AUS	Matt Simon Short term deals 12/08/06, 05/05/07-21/01/07
25	FW	AUS	Damian Mori Short term deal 06/10/06 - 19/11/06
30	GK	AUS	Matthew Trott Short term deal

=== Coaching staff ===
- Football Manager: Lawrie McKinna
- Head Coach: Ian Ferguson
- Development Manager: Alex Tobin
- Strength & Conditioning: Andrew Clark

== Pre-Season Cup ==
=== Group stage ===
The Mariners were put in Group A, along with Adelaide United (3rd in 2005-06 A-League season), Perth Glory (5th) and Melbourne Victory (7th). They had two home games in the three-game round-robin series, with one played at Wade Park, Orange, New South Wales, against Adelaide United, and the other at their traditional home, Central Coast Stadium.

Central Coast started their defence of the Pre-Season Cup well, defeating Perth Glory - the team they defeated in the 2005 Pre-Season Cup final - 2–1 at Central Coast Stadium, Gosford in front of 5,682 spectators. Both Central Coast strikers, Stewart Petrie and Adam Kwasnik, scored early goals. They followed this up with a gritty nil-all draw at Wade Park against last year's minor premiers, Adelaide United. Coach McKinna said after the game he was, "quite contented with the result". For their final Group A game, they travelled to Melbourne's Olympic Park, where they downed the Melbourne Victory 3–1, with Adam Kwasnik, Paul O'Grady and Noel Spencer all scoring for the Mariners.

Central Coast played their "bonus" fourth group-crossover round against the Queensland Roar. The "bonus" round awarded "bonus points" based on goals scored (one point for two goals, two points for three goals and three points for four or more goals). On this occasion, the Mariners and Roar drew 0–0, and both earned the conventional one point for a draw.

Team	Pts	Pld	W	D	L	GF	GA	Qualification
Central Coast Mariners	8	4	2	2	0	5	2	Advance to semi-finals
Adelaide United	8	4	2	2	0	2	0	Advance to semi-finals
Melbourne Victory	6	4	1	1	2	5	7	
Perth Glory	3	4	0	3	1	2	3	

15 July 2006 1	Central Coast Mariners	2–1	Perth Glory	Gosford
18:00	Petrie 7'; Kwasnik 8'	Report	Bertos 62'	Stadium: Bluetongue Central Coast Stadium; Attendance: 5,682; Referee: James Lewis

22 July 2006 2	Central Coast Mariners	0–0	Adelaide United	Orange
15:00		Report		Stadium: Wade Park; Attendance: 4,344; Referee: Simon Przydacz

29 July 2006 3	Melbourne Victory	1–3	Central Coast Mariners	Melbourne
15:00	Thompson 3'	Report	Kwasnik 36'; O'Grady 63'; Spencer 76'	Stadium: Olympic Park Stadium; Attendance: 6,593; Referee: Craig Zetter

6 August 2006 Bonus	Brisbane Roar	0–0	Central Coast Mariners	Toowoomba
15:00		Report		Stadium: Clive Berghofer Stadium; Attendance: 4,571; Referee: Peter Green

=== Finals ===
Finishing on top of Group A, with Adelaide United relegated to second on goal differential, the Mariners took on the Newcastle Jets in a fiery local derby in the playoff stage. Newcastle took the lead in the 25th minute, before Stewart Petrie converted a penalty in the 53rd minute. The game progressed into extra time, and a 96th-minute header from Paul O'Grady gave the Mariners a chance to defend their Pre-Season title in what was their fourth consecutive domestic final in as many competition entries.

In the grand final, they lost to Adelaide United 5-4 on penalties, after the score was tied 1-1 after extra time. Carl Veart scored early for Adelaide before the Mariners levelled in the 77th minute through attacking midfielder Andre Gumprecht. In the penalty shootout, Stewart Petrie was the only player to miss on either side, hitting the crossbar.

12 August 2006 Semi-final	Central Coast Mariners	2–1 (a.e.t.)	Newcastle Jets	Gosford
18:00	Petrie 53' (pen.); O'Grady 96'	Report	Coveny 25'	Stadium: Bluetongue Central Coast Stadium; Attendance: 7,567; Referee: Ben Williams

19 August 2006 Final	Central Coast Mariners	1–1 (a.e.t.) (4–5 p)	Adelaide United	Gosford
18:00	Gumprecht 77'	Report	Veart 7'	Stadium: Bluetongue Central Coast Stadium; Attendance: 10,463; Referee: Simon Przydacz
	Penalties
	McMaster (penalty scored); Petrie (penalty missed); O'Sullivan (penalty scored); Spencer (penalty scored); Hutchinson (penalty scored)		(penalty scored) Alagich; (penalty scored) Owens; (penalty scored) Aloisi; (penalty scored) Qu; (penalty scored) Veart

== 2006-07 Hyundai A-League fixtures ==
27 August 2006	Sydney FC	1 : 0	Central Coast Mariners	Aussie Stadium, Sydney
17:00 UTC+10	Fyfe 52'			Attendance: 19,274; Referee: (Australia) Mark Shield

3 September 2006	Perth Glory	2 : 0	Central Coast Mariners	Members Equity Stadium, Perth
	Young 81'; Colosimo 52'			Attendance: 7,229; Referee: (Australia) Craig Zetter

9 September 2006	Central Coast Mariners	0 : 0	Queensland Roar	Bluetongue Stadium, Gosford
				Attendance: 4,644; Referee: (New Zealand) Peter O'Leary

17 September 2006	Melbourne Victory	1 : 0	Central Coast Mariners	Olympic Park Stadium, Melbourne
	Thompson 51'			Attendance: 17,617; Referee: (Australia) Angelo Nardi

23 September 2006	Central Coast Mariners	1 : 1	Newcastle Jets	Bluetongue Stadium, Gosford
	Hutchinson 12'		Griffiths 84', (yellow card) (yellow-red card) 90'; Okon (red card) 75'	Attendance: 8,439; Referee: (Australia) Simon Przydacz

28 September 2006	New Zealand Knights	0 : 1	Central Coast Mariners	North Harbour Stadium, Auckland
	Duruz (red card) 87'; Bunce (red card) 83'		Kwasnik 85' (pen.)	Attendance: 1,632; Referee: (New Zealand) Peter O'Leary

6 October 2006	Adelaide United	3 : 1	Central Coast Mariners	Hindmarsh Stadium, Adelaide
	Burns 90'; Rees 58'; Veart 25'		Mori 38'	Attendance: 10,493; Referee: (Australia) Ben Williams

13 October 2006	Central Coast Mariners	3 : 1	Sydney FC	Bluetongue Stadium, Gosford
	Mori 52', 90'; O'Grady 40'		Carbone 12'	Attendance: 11,567; Referee: (Australia) Simon Przydacz

20 October 2006	Central Coast Mariners	2 : 1	Perth Glory	Bluetongue Stadium, Gosford
	Pondeljak 2', 87'		Despotovski 58'	Attendance: 8,496; Referee: (Australia) Matthew Breeze

28 October 2006	Queensland Roar	1 : 1	Central Coast Mariners	Suncorp Stadium, Brisbane
	Reinaldo 49'		Mori 21'	Attendance: 13,727; Referee: (Australia) Mark Shield

3 November 2006	Melbourne Victory	3 : 3	Central Coast Mariners	Telstra Dome, Melbourne
	Allsopp 4', 68'; Thompson 10'; Vargas (red card) 21'; Muscat (red card) 45'		McMaster 6'; Petrie 11'; Kwasnik 23' (pen.)	Attendance: 28.118; Referee: (Australia) Peter Green

11 November 2006	Newcastle Jets	3 : 1	Central Coast Mariners	EnergyAustralia Stadium, Newcastle
	Bridge 6'; Carle 17'; Rodriguez 79'		Mori 40'	Attendance: 14,026; Referee: (Australia) Matthew Breeze

19 November 2006	New Zealand Knights	0 : 2	Central Coast Mariners	North Harbour Stadium, Auckland
			Mori 65'; Mrdja 90+5'	Attendance: 2,139; Referee: (Australia) Peter Green

25 November 2006	Central Coast Mariners	2 : 0	Adelaide United	Bluetongue Stadium, Gosford
	Kwasnik 55'; Petrie 59'			Attendance: 13,119; Referee: (Australia) Mark Shield

3 December 2006	Central Coast Mariners	0 : 0	Sydney FC	Bluetongue Stadium, Gosford
				Attendance: 12,457; Referee: (Australia) Matthew Breeze

10 December 2006	Central Coast Mariners	1 : 0	Perth Glory	Bluetongue Stadium, Gosford
	Kwasnik 12'			Attendance: 8,089; Referee: (New Zealand) Peter O’Leary

16 December 2006	Central Coast Mariners	2 : 3	Queensland Roar	Bluetongue Stadium, Gosford
	Kwasnik 29' (pen.), 77' (pen.)		Griffin 40'; Vidosic 63', 80'	Attendance: 7,132; Referee: (Australia) Matthew Breeze

31 December 2006	Central Coast Mariners	1 : 2	Melbourne Victory	Bluetongue Stadium, Gosford
	Kwasnik 52'		Fred 23'; Thompson 26'	Attendance: 15404; Referee: (Australia) Mark Shield

5 January 2007	Newcastle Jets	1 : 0	Central Coast Mariners	EnergyAustralia Stadium, Newcastle
	Rodriguez 25'			Attendance: 14,828; Referee: (Australia) Mark Shield

11 January 2007	Central Coast Mariners	0 : 0	New Zealand Knights	Bluetongue Stadium, Gosford
				Attendance: 10,637; Referee: (Australia) Ben Williams

21 January 2007	Central Coast Mariners	1 : 3	Adelaide United	Bluetongue Stadium, Gosford
	Pondeljak 77'		Burns 10', 49', 66'	Attendance: 8,128; Referee: (Australia) Simon Przydacz

=== Table ===
Pos	Team	Pld	W	D	L	GF	GA	GD	Pts	Qualification
1	Melbourne Victory (C)	21	14	3	4	41	20	+21	45	Qualification for 2008 AFC Champions League group stage and Finals series
2	Adelaide United	21	10	3	8	32	27	+5	33	Qualification for 2008 AFC Champions League group stage and Finals series
3	Newcastle Jets	21	8	6	7	32	30	+2	30	Qualification for Finals series
4	Sydney FC	21	8	8	5	29	19	+10	29 (Note: Sydney FC were penalised three competition points following round 18 due to salary cap breaches which occurred during the 2005–06 season)	Qualification for Finals series
5	Queensland Roar	21	8	5	8	25	27	−2	29	
6	Central Coast Mariners	21	6	6	9	22	26	−4	24	
7	Perth Glory	21	5	5	11	24	30	−6	20	
8	New Zealand Knights (Note: New Zealand Knights cannot qualify for the AFC Champions League as they are not recognised as an AFC club.)	21	5	4	12	13	39	−26	19	Disbanded at end of season

Source: ultimatealeague.com
Rules for classification: 1) points; 2) goal difference; 3) number of goals scored.
(C) Champions

==== Results summary ====
Overall								Home						Away					
Pld	W	D	L	GF	GA	GD	Pts	W	D	L	GF	GA	GD	W	D	L	GF	GA	GD
21	6	6	9	22	26	−4	24	4	4	3	13	11	+2	2	2	6	9	15	−6

== Player statistics ==
The Mariners used a total of 23 players during the 2006–07 season and there were nine different goalscorers. There were also two squad members who did not make a first-team appearance in the campaign. Alex Wilkinson and Adam Kwasnik both featured in all 27 competitive matches the side played in the campaign.

The team scored a total of 30 goals in all competitions. The highest scorere was Kwasnik, with nine goals, followed by Damian Mori who scored six goals. Mile Jedinak was the only player sent off in the season.

Key

No. = Squad number

Pos = Playing position

Nat. = Nationality

Apps = Appearances

GK = Goalkeeper

DF = Defender

MF = Midfielder

FW = Forward

= Yellow cards

= Red cards

Numbers in parentheses denote appearances as substitute. Players with number struck through and marked † left the club during the playing season.

No.	Pos.	Nat.	Name	A-League		Pre-Season Cup		Total		Discipline	
No.	Pos.	Nat.	Name	Apps	Goals	Apps	Goals	Apps	Goals	A yellow rectangular card	A red rectangular card
1	GK	AUS	John Crawley	0	0	0	0	0	0	0	0
2	DF	IRE	Wayne O'Sullivan	14	0	2	0	16	0	1	0
3	DF	AUS	Paul O'Grady	13 (1)	1	4 (1)	2	17 (2)	3	5	0
4	MF	AUS	Noel Spencer	16	0	6	1	22	1	5	0
5	DF	AUS	Brad Porter	3 (3)	0	(3)	0	3 (6)	0	0	0
6	MF	GER	Andre Gumprecht	11	0	6	1	17	1	2	0
7	MF	AUS	John Hutchinson	6 (10)	1	(1)	0	6 (11)	1	2	0
8	MF	AUS	Jamie McMaster	19	1	5	0	24	1	9	0
9	FW	AUS	Nik Mrdja	3 (3)	1	0	0	3 (3)	1	1	0
10	MF	AUS	Tom Pondeljak	16	3	0	0	16	3	0	0
11	DF	AUS	Damien Brown	14	0	6	0	20	0	1	0
12	FW	SCO	Stewart Petrie	18	2	5	2	23	4	4	0
13	DF	AUS	Tony Vidmar	15	0	2	0	17	0	4	0
14	DF	AUS	Vuko Tomasevic	8 (3)	0	6	0	14 (3)	0	1	0
15	DF	AUS	Andrew Clark	8 (3)	0	5	0	13 (3)	0	3	0
16	DF	AUS	Nigel Boogaard	0	0	0	0	0	0	0	0
17	MF	AUS	Matthew Osman	13	0	2	0	15	0	4	0
18	DF	AUS	Alex Wilkinson	21	0	6	0	27	0	2	0
19	FW	AUS	Adam Kwasnik	19 (2)	7	6	2	25 (2)	9	4	0
20	GK	AUS	Danny Vukovic	20	0	6	0	26	0	1	0
~~21~~	FW	AUS	James Holland †	0	0	(3)	0	(3)	0	1	0
~~22~~	MF	AUS	Oliver Bozanic †	0	0	1 (1)	0	1 (1)	0	0	0
23	MF	AUS	Mile Jedinak	8	0	(1)	0	8 (1)	0	2	1
24	FW	AUS	Matt Simon	(3)	0	(1)	0	(4)	0	0	0
~~25~~	FW	AUS	Damian Mori †	8	6	0	0	8	6	1	0
30	GK	AUS	Matthew Trott	1	0	(1)	0	1 (1)	0	0	0
