= 2007–08 Central Coast Mariners FC season =

Central Coast Mariners
2007–08 season
- Chairman: Lyall Gorman
- Manager: Lawrie McKinna
- Stadium: Bluetongue Stadium
- A-League regular season: Premiers
- A-League finals: Runners-up
- Pre-Season Cup: 4th
- Top goalscorer: League: John Aloisi (7); All: Sasho Petrovski (9)
- Highest home attendance: 36,354 vs Newcastle Jets (24 February 2008)

The 2007–08 season was the 3rd season of competitive football played by Central Coast Mariners. The Mariners ended the season as A-League Premiers after topping the table in the regular season, but runners-up in the Championship after losing to local rivals Newcastle Jets in the 2008 A-League Grand Final.

In the transfer window the club signed experienced striker Sasho Petrovski and former Adelaide United midfielder Greg Owens. Left back Dean Heffernan also returned to the club after completing a loan spell with 1. FC Nürnberg. Club captain Noel Spencer was released, joining Sydney FC.

After a mixed pre-season, finishing fourth in the 2007 A-League Pre-Season Challenge Cup, the Mariners began the 2007–08 A-League in good form, undefeated for their first five games. Winless runs in October and January saw a number of clubs threaten Central Coast at the top of the table. This included a 5–4 loss to Sydney FC in December, breaking the record for goals in an A-League match. The mid-season addition of Socceroo John Aloisi proved successful, with the striker scoring a team-high seven league goals. A win over Wellington Phoenix in the final game of the regular season secured a first Premiership for the club, ahead of Newcastle Jets on goal difference. In the Finals Series, the Mariners advanced to the Grand Final by defeating the Jets 3–2 over two legs. The Jets, however, claimed the Championship with a 1–0 win in controversial circumstances at the Sydney Football Stadium.

== Background ==
The Mariners ended the previous season in sixth, missing out on the Finals Series.

=== Transfers ===
In

No.	Position	Player	Transferred from	Fee	Date	Ref
22	FW	Sasho Petrovski	Sydney FC	Free	12 February 2007	
23	MF	Mile Jedinak	Sydney United	Free	26 February 2007	
12	MF	Greg Owens	Adelaide United	Free	12 March 2007	
8	DF	Dean Heffernan	1. FC Nürnberg	Loan return	6 June 2007	
30	GK	Andrew Redmayne	Australian Institute of Sport	Free	19 June 2007	
4	MF	Ian McAndrew	Central Coast Lightning	Free	1 August 2007	
24	FW	Damian Mori	Adelaide City	Free	21 September 2007	
25	FW	John Aloisi	Free agent	N/A	19 October 2007	
26	DF	Alvin Ceccoli	Free agent	N/A	3 January 2008	

Out

No.	Position	Player	Transferred to	Fee	Date	Ref
14	DF	Vuko Tomasevic	Free agent	N/A	25 January 2007	
2	DF	Wayne O'Sullivan	Free agent	N/A	25 January 2007	
4	MF	Noel Spencer	Sydney FC	Free	16 February 2007	
8	MF	Jamie McMaster	Free agent	N/A	18 April 2007	
12	FW	Stewart Petrie	Free agent	N/A	18 April 2007	
1	GK	John Crawley	Retired	N/A	19 June 2007	
24	FW	Damian Mori	Free agent	N/A	13 October 2007	

== Pre-season ==
22 May 2007 Friendly	Central Coast Mariners	3–0	Malaysia	Lisarow
	Hutchinson 55'; Woodcock 78'; Owens 86'	Report		Stadium: Pluim Park; Attendance: 2,000; Referee: James Lewis

== A-League Pre-Season Challenge Cup ==
=== Group stage ===
Group B
Team	Pld	W	D	L	GF	GA	BP	Pts
Central Coast Mariners	3	2	1	0	6	1	3	10
Queensland Roar	3	1	2	0	3	2	1	6
Wellington Phoenix	3	1	0	2	4	4	2	5
Sydney FC	3	0	1	2	0	6	0	1

14 July 2007 1	Central Coast Mariners	2–0	Wellington Phoenix	Gosford
18:00	Wilkinson 3'; Kwasnik 32'	Report		Stadium: Bluetongue Stadium; Attendance: 8,136; Referee: Strebre Delovski

21 July 2007 2	Central Coast Mariners	1–1	Queensland Roar	Orange
15:00	Boogaard 6'	Report	Lynch 60'	Stadium: Wade Park; Attendance: 3,531; Referee: James Lewis

29 July 2007 3	Sydney FC	0–3	Central Coast Mariners	Canberra
15:00		Report	Osman 36'; Kwasnik 44'; Gumprecht 51'	Stadium: Canberra Stadium; Attendance: 5,735; Referee: Ben Williams

=== Playoffs ===
4 August 2007 Semi-final	Central Coast Mariners	2–3	Perth Glory	Gosford
18:00	Mrdja 43'; Petrovski 90'	Report	Dragičević 23'; Bertos 55'; Tarka 78'	Stadium: Bluetongue Stadium; Attendance: 5,967; Referee: Ben Williams

12 August 2007 3rd place playoff	Central Coast Mariners	1–3	Queensland Roar	Gosford
16:00	Simon 9'	Report	Milicic 30'; Marchinho 48'; Reinaldo 86'	Stadium: Bluetongue Stadium; Attendance: 3,500; Referee: James Lewis

== 2007–08 Hyundai A-League fixtures ==
24 August 2007	Sydney FC	0–1	Central Coast Mariners	Sydney Football Stadium, Sydney
20:00 UTC+10		Report; Summary	Petrovski 7'	Attendance: 18,457; Referee: (Australia) Peter Green

31 August 2007	Central Coast Mariners	3–0	Wellington Phoenix	Bluetongue Stadium, Gosford
20:00 UTC+10	Mrdja 9', 35'; Kwasnik 13'	Report; Summary		Attendance: 9,052; Referee: (Australia) Peter Green

6 September 2007	Queensland Roar	0–1	Central Coast Mariners	Suncorp Stadium, Brisbane
20:00 UTC+10		Report; Summary	Kwasnik 55'	Attendance: 8,815; Referee: (Australia) Mark Shield

16 September 2007	Melbourne Victory	0–0	Central Coast Mariners	Telstra Dome, Melbourne
17:00 UTC+10		Report; Summary	Vidmar (red card) 90+2'	Attendance: 27,351; Referee: (Australia) Mark Shield

23 September 2007	Central Coast Mariners	1–0	Perth Glory	Bluetongue Stadium, Gosford
19:00 UTC+10	Petrovski 80'	Report; Summary		Attendance: 9,274; Referee: (Australia) Craig Zetter

30 September 2007	Adelaide United	2–1	Central Coast Mariners	Hindmarsh Stadium, Adelaide
16:30 UTC+9:30	Djite 19', 88'	Report; Summary	Petrovski 37'; Vidmar (yellow card) 65' (yellow-red card) 79'	Attendance: 11,019; Referee: (Australia) Matthew Breeze

7 October 2007	Central Coast Mariners	1–1	Newcastle Jets	Bluetongue Stadium, Gosford
17:00 UTC+10	Pondeljak 62'	Report; Summary	Bridge 82'	Attendance: 12,622; Referee: (Australia) Matthew Breeze

14 October 2007	Central Coast Mariners	0–1	Queensland Roar	Bluetongue Stadium, Gosford
17:00 UTC+10	Porter (red card) 31'	Report; Summary	McCloughan 5'	Attendance: 8,113; Referee: (New Zealand) Peter O'Leary

21 October 2007	Wellington Phoenix	1–2	Central Coast Mariners	Westpac Stadium, Wellington
17:00 UTC+12	Elrich 24'	Report; Summary	Heffernan 16'; Petrovski 90+1'	Attendance: 10,560; Referee: (Australia) Peter Green

28 October 2007	Sydney FC	3–2	Central Coast Mariners	Sydney Football Stadium, Sydney
15:00 UTC+10	Brosque 16', 26'; Popovic 32'	Report; Summary	Hutchinson 27', 56'	Attendance: 17,652; Referee: (Australia) Mark Shield

4 November 2007	Central Coast Mariners	2–1	Melbourne Victory	Bluetongue Stadium, Gosford
17:00 UTC+11	Petrovski 83', (yellow card) 73' (yellow-red card) 90'; Pondeljak 88'	Report; Summary	Keenan (red card) 22'; Hernández 77'; Vargas (red card) 90'	Attendance: 11,354; Referee: (Australia) Mark Shield

10 November 2007	Central Coast Mariners	2–0	Adelaide United	Bluetongue Stadium, Gosford
17:00 UTC+11	J.Aloisi 48' (pen.), 59'	Report; Summary		Attendance: 11,680; Referee: (Australia) Simon Przydacz

18 November 2007	Perth Glory	0–1	Central Coast Mariners	Members Equity Stadium, Perth
19:00 UTC+9		Summary	Owens 13'; Jedinak (yellow card) 83' (yellow-red card) 88'	Attendance: 7,310; Referee: (Australia) Craig Zetter

25 November 2007	Newcastle Jets	0–0	Central Coast Mariners	EnergyAustralia Stadium, Newcastle
17:00 UTC+11		Report; Summary		Attendance: 14,169; Referee: (Australia) Mark Shield

9 December 2007	Queensland Roar	2–1	Central Coast Mariners	Suncorp Stadium, Brisbane
18:00 UTC+10	Vidmar 21' (o.g.); McKay 28'	Report; Summary	J.Aloisi 13'	Attendance: 16,442; Referee: (Australia) Ben Williams

14 December 2007	Adelaide United	1–2	Central Coast Mariners	Hindmarsh Stadium, Adelaide
19:30 UTC+10:30	Agostino 70'	Report; Summary	J.Aloisi 24'; Petrovski 48'	Attendance: 11,123; Referee: (Australia) Peter Green

22 December 2007	Central Coast Mariners	4–5	Sydney FC	Bluetongue Stadium, Gosford
19:00 UTC+11	Jedinak 3'; J.Aloisi 16'; Vukovic (red card) 17'; Owens 63' (pen.); Kwasnik 86' (red card) 90+4'	Report; Summary	Fyfe 33'; McFlynn 50'; Biddle 71'; Santalab 76'; Talay 90+5' (pen.)	Attendance: 17,514; Referee: (Australia) Matthew Breeze

31 December 2007	Central Coast Mariners	2–5	Melbourne Victory	Bluetongue Stadium, Gosford
18:00 UTC+11	Jedinak 32'; J.Aloisi 63'	Report; Summary	Caceres 4'; Allsopp 23', 61'; Thompson 36'; Muscat 43' (pen.)	Attendance: 18,686; Referee: (Australia) Mark Shield

6 January 2008	Perth Glory	1–1	Central Coast Mariners	Members Equity Stadium, Perth
19:00 UTC+9	Rukavytsya 69'	Report; Summary	Hutchinson 38'	Attendance: 6,727; Referee: (Australia) Strebre Delovski

12 January 2008	Central Coast Mariners	1–2	Newcastle Jets	Bluetongue Stadium, Gosford
19:00 UTC+11	Kwasnik 9'	Report; Summary	Holland 6'; J. Griffiths 52'	Attendance: 19,238; Referee: (Australia) Matthew Breeze

19 January 2008	Central Coast Mariners	2–0	Wellington Phoenix	Bluetongue Stadium, Gosford
19:00 UTC+11	Aloisi 52'; Kwasnik 90+4'	Report; Summary		Attendance: 9,849; Referee: (Australia) Kevin Docherty

=== 2007–08 Finals series ===
27 January 2008 Major SF Leg 1	Newcastle Jets	2–0	Central Coast Mariners	EnergyAustralia Stadium, Newcastle
18:00 UTC+11	A. Griffiths 22'; J. Griffiths 85' (pen.)	Report; Summary		Attendance: 22,960; Referee: (Australia) Matthew Breeze

10 February 2008 Major SF Leg 2	Central Coast Mariners	3 – 0 (a.e.t.)	Newcastle Jets	Bluetongue Stadium, Gosford
18:00 UTC+11	Kwasnik 37'; Petrovski 74', 95'	Summary		Attendance: 19,112; Referee: (Australia) Ben Williams

24 February 2008 Grand Final	Central Coast Mariners	0–1	Newcastle Jets	Sydney Football Stadium, Sydney
17:00 UTC+11	Vukovic (red card) 90+5'	Summary	Bridge 64'	Attendance: 36,354; Referee: (Australia) Mark Shield

== Home-and-Away Season ==
Pos	Team	Pld	W	D	L	GF	GA	GD	Pts	Qualification
1	Central Coast Mariners	21	10	4	7	30	25	+5	34	Qualification for 2009 AFC Champions League group stage and Finals series (Note: First place qualifies for the 2009 AFC Champions League group stage. Winning the 2008 A-League Grand Final earns qualification for the 2009 AFC Champions League group stage, unless the Grand Final winners are also first place, in which case the Grand Final runner up qualifies.)
2	Newcastle Jets (C)	21	9	7	5	25	21	+4	34	Qualification for 2009 AFC Champions League group stage and Finals series
3	Sydney FC	21	8	8	5	28	24	+4	32	Qualification for 2008 Pan-Pacific Championship and Finals series
4	Queensland Roar	21	8	7	6	25	21	+4	31	Qualification for Finals series
5	Melbourne Victory	21	6	9	6	29	29	0	27	
6	Adelaide United	21	6	8	7	31	29	+2	26	
7	Perth Glory	21	4	8	9	27	34	−7	20	
8	Wellington Phoenix (Note: Wellington Phoenix cannot qualify for the AFC Champions League as they are not recognised as an AFC club.)	21	5	5	11	25	37	−12	20	

Source: ultimatealeague.com
Rules for classification: 1) points; 2) goal difference; 3) number of goals scored.
(C) Champions

== Player statistics ==
Key

No. = Squad number

Pos = Playing position

Nat. = Nationality

Apps = Appearances

GK = Goalkeeper

DF = Defender

MF = Midfielder

FW = Forward

= Yellow cards

= Red cards

Numbers in parentheses denote appearances as substitute. Players with number struck through and marked † left the club during the playing season.

No.	Pos.	Nat.	Name	A-League		A-League finals		Pre-Season Cup		Total		Discipline	
No.	Pos.	Nat.	Name	Apps	Goals	Apps	Goals	Apps	Goals	Apps	Goals	A yellow rectangular card	A red rectangular card
1	GK	AUS	Matthew Trott	4 (1)	0	0	0	2	0	6 (1)	0	0	0
2	FW	AUS	Matt Simon	4 (14)	0	0 (2)	0	1	1	5 (16)	1	0	0
3	DF	AUS	Paul O'Grady	2 (4)	0	0	0	0 (1)	0	2 (5)	0	2	0
4	MF	AUS	Ian McAndrew	0 (1)	0	0	0	0	0	0 (1)	0	0	0
5	MF	AUS	Brad Porter	5 (3)	0	0	0	0 (4)	0	5 (7)	0	0	1
6	MF	GER	André Gumprecht	8 (6)	0	0 (3)	0	5	1	13 (9)	1	3	0
7	MF	AUS	John Hutchinson	18	3	3	0	4	0	25	3	7	0
8	DF	AUS	Dean Heffernan	15 (1)	1	0	0	2 (1)	0	17 (2)	1	7	0
9	FW	AUS	Nik Mrdja	3	2	0	0	3 (2)	1	6 (2)	3	1	0
10	MF	AUS	Tom Pondeljak	13 (5)	2	2 (1)	0	2 (2)	0	17 (8)	2	0	0
11	DF	AUS	Damien Brown	7 (1)	0	0	0	3	0	10 (1)	0	2	0
12	MF	AUS	Greg Owens	10 (2)	2	1 (1)	0	0 (1)	0	11 (4)	2	2	0
13	DF	AUS	Tony Vidmar	15	0	3	0	1 (2)	0	19 (2)	0	6	2
15	DF	AUS	Andrew Clark	12 (5)	0	0 (2)	0	1	0	13 (7)	0	5	0
16	DF	AUS	Nigel Boogaard	13 (1)	0	3	0	4 (1)	1	20 (2)	1	5	0
17	MF	AUS	Matthew Osman	6 (1)	0	0	0	5	1	11 (1)	1	0	0
18	DF	AUS	Alex Wilkinson	12	0	3	0	5	1	20	1	1	0
19	FW	AUS	Adam Kwasnik	12 (7)	5	3	1	5	2	20 (7)	8	2	0
20	GK	AUS	Danny Vukovic	17	0	3	0	3	0	23	0	1	2
22	FW	AUS	Sasho Petrovski	18 (1)	6	3	2	4	1	25 (1)	9	11	1
23	MF	AUS	Mile Jedinak	19	2	3	0	5	0	27	2	8	1
~~24~~	FW	AUS	Damian Mori †	3	0	0	0	0	0	3	0	0	0
25	DF	AUS	John Aloisi	12	7	3	0	0	0	15	7	4	0
26	DF	AUS	Alvin Ceccoli	3	0	3	0	0	0	6	0	0	0
30	GK	AUS	Andrew Redmayne	0	0	0	0	0	0	0	0	0	0
