= 2005–06 Central Coast Mariners FC season =

Central Coast Mariners FC
2005–06 season
- Manager: Lawrie McKinna
- A-League: 3rd
- Finals: 2nd
- Pre-season cup: 1st
- Top goalscorer: S. Petrie (8)

The 2005–06 season was the first for both the Central Coast Mariners and the A-League

Compared with its Sydney rival, the Central Coast Mariners had a far more low-key buildup to the inaugural A-League season. The majority of its squad were experienced players from the defunct National Soccer League. They generally exceeded most expectations, having a very successful season, culminating in two solid displays in the preliminary competitions and reaching the grand final in the A-League.

== Players ==
=== First team squad ===
Note: Flags indicate national team as defined under FIFA eligibility rules; some limited exceptions apply. Players may hold more than one non-FIFA nationality.

No.	Pos.	Nation	Player
1	GK	AUS	John Crawley
2	MF	IRL	Wayne O'Sullivan
3	DF	AUS	Paul O'Grady
4	MF	AUS	Noel Spencer (captain)
5	DF	AUS	Michael Beauchamp
6	MF	GER	André Gumprecht
7	MF	AUS	John Hutchinson
8	DF	AUS	Dean Heffernan
9	FW	AUS	Nick Mrdja
10	MF	AUS	Tom Pondeljak
11	MF	AUS	Damien Brown
12	FW	SCO	Stewart Petrie
13	FW	AUS	Russell Woodruffe

No.	Pos.	Nation	Player
14	MF	AUS	Leo Carle
15	DF	AUS	Andrew Clark
16	DF	AUS	Nigel Boogaard
17	MF	AUS	Matthew Osman
18	DF	AUS	Alex Wilkinson
19	FW	AUS	Adam Kwasnik
20	GK	AUS	Danny Vukovic
21	MF	SCO	Ian Ferguson Short term cover
22	MF	AUS	Jamie McMaster Short term cover
23	MF	AUS	Brad Porter Short term cover
24	FW	AUS	Dez Giraldi Short term cover
30	GK	AUS	Matthew Trott Short term cover

== Matches ==
=== 2005-06 Pre-season fixtures ===
Round	Date	Home team	Score	Away team	Crowd
1	30 March 2005	Central Coast	3-0	Gladesville Spirit	Unknown
2	14 April 2005	Central Coast	9-0	Wyoming FC	Unknown
3	19 April 2005	Central Coast	3-3	Manly United	Unknown
4	25 April 2005	Central Coast	3-0	Blacktown City	No public access
5	27 April 2005	Central Coast	2-0	Bonnyrigg White Eagles	Unknown
6	8 July 2005	Central Coast	6-0	Townsville	Unknown
7	9 July 2005	Central Coast	1-2	Queensland Roar	Unknown
8	12 July 2005	Central Coast	3-0	Central Coast Select XI	1500
9	16 July 2005	Central Coast	2-0	New Zealand Knights	Unknown

=== Phillips International Soccer Sevens ===
The Mariners competed in Phillips International soccer sevens tournament played in Hong Kong. Their group featured three of the biggest teams in the world, PSV, Manchester United and Celtic. The Mariners caused one of the upsets of the tournament by defeating a somewhat understrength Manchester United 2–1.

Round	Date	Home team	Score	Away team	Crowd
1	28 May 2005	HKF Association Chairman's Select	2-1	Central Coast	Unknown
2	28 May 2005	Central Coast	2-0	Hong Kong Football Club 2	Unknown
3	28 May 2005	Central Coast	0-0	Celtic	Unknown
Quarter Final	29 May 2005	Central Coast	2-1	Manchester United	Unknown
Semi Final	29 May 2005	Central Coast	0-1	PSV	Unknown

=== Club World Cup Qualification Competition ===
The Mariners were runners-up to Sydney FC in the qualifying tournament held to determine Australia's entry in the FIFA Club World Cup, losing in the grand final 1–0.

Round 1 (7 May)
Sydney FC	3
Queensland Roar	0
Central Coast Mariners (PEN)	0 (4)
Newcastle Jets	0 (2)
Adelaide United (PEN)	0 (4)
Melbourne Victory	0 (1)

Semi-finals (11 May)
Perth Glory	1
Sydney FC	2
Central Coast Mariners	4
Adelaide United	0

Finals (15 May)
Central Coast Mariners	0
Sydney FC	1

=== 2005 Pre-Season Cup ===
Group B

Team	Pts	Pld	W	D	L	GF	GA
Sydney FC	7	3	2	1	0	5	1
Central Coast	6	3	2	0	1	4	3
Queensland Roar FC	4	3	1	1	1	6	3
New Zealand Knights FC	0	3	0	0	3	1	9

Semi-finals
12 August
Melbourne Victory	1
Central Coast Mariners	3
14 August
Sydney FC	0
Perth Glory	1

Final
21 August
Central Coast Mariners	1
Perth Glory	0

=== 2005-06 A-League fixtures ===
26 August 2005 Round 1	Perth Glory	0 : 1	Central Coast Mariners	Members Equity Stadium
20:00 UTC+8		Report; Summary	Spencer 66'	Attendance: 11,113; Referee: Ben Williams

4 September 2005 Round 2	Central Coast Mariners	1 : 1	Newcastle Jets	Bluetongue Stadium
15:00 UTC+10	Petrie 69'	Report; Summary	Milicic 25'	Attendance: 5,917; Referee: Mark Shield

10 September 2005 Round 3	Central Coast Mariners	0 : 2	New Zealand Knights	Bluetongue Stadium
19:35 UTC+10		Report; Summary	Yeo 69'; Devine 80'	Attendance: 5,261; Referee: Ben Williams

16 September 2005 Round 4	Sydney FC	2 : 3	Central Coast Mariners	Aussie Stadium
20:00 UTC+10	Packer 13'; Yorke 72'	Report; Summary	Petrie 20' (pen.); Gumprecht 35'; Spencer 90+1'	Attendance: 15,614; Referee: Peter O'Leary

25 September 2005 Round 5	Adelaide United	1 : 1	Central Coast Mariners	Hindmarsh Stadium
17:00 UTC+9:30	Valkanis 34'	Report; Summary	Kwasnik 19'	Attendance: 7,013; Referee: Angelo Nardi

30 September 2005 Round 6	Central Coast Mariners	1 : 2	Melbourne Victory	Bluetongue Stadium
20:00 UTC+10	Heffernan 33'	Report; Summary	Thompson 73'; Leijer 81'	Attendance: 9,313; Referee: Ben Williams

7 October 2005 Round 7	Queensland Roar	1 : 1	Central Coast Mariners	Suncorp Stadium
20:00 UTC+10	Seo 57'	Report; Summary	Spencer 41'	Attendance: 13,195; Referee: Perry Mur

16 October 2005 Round 8	Central Coast Mariners	4 : 0	Perth Glory	Bluetongue Stadium
17:00 UTC+10	Petrie 14', 48'; Heffernan 85'; Spencer 90+3'	Report; Summary		Attendance: 6,494; Referee: Ben Williams

23 October 2005 Round 9	Newcastle Jets	1 : 0	Central Coast Mariners	Energy Australia Stadium
17:00 UTC+10	Parisi 88'	Report; Summary		Attendance: 9,371; Referee: Matthew Breeze

29 October 2005 Round 10	New Zealand Knights	1 : 3	Central Coast Mariners	North Harbour Stadium
20:00 UTC+12	Yeo 7' (pen.)	Report; Summary	Heffernan 4'; Petrie 49', 72' (pen.)	Attendance: 2,583; Referee: Neil Fox

5 November 2005 Round 11	Central Coast Mariners	1 : 5	Sydney FC	Bluetongue Stadium
20:00 UTC+11	Hutchinson 40'	Report; Summary	Yorke 9' (pen.); Talay 14'; Petrovski 23', 68', 83'	Attendance: 10,529; Referee: Simon Przydacz

13 November 2005 Round 12	Central Coast Mariners	1 : 2	Adelaide United	Bluetongue Stadium
	Hutchinson 12'		Rech 90'; Dodd 85'	Attendance: 5,467; Referee: Peter O'Leary

18 November 2005 Round 13	Melbourne Victory	0 : 2	Central Coast Mariners	Olympic Park Stadium
			Heffernan 75'; Hutchinson 38'	Attendance: 13,892; Referee: Ben Williams

25 November 2005 Round 14	Central Coast Mariners	2 : 2	Queensland Roar	Bluetongue Stadium
	Heffernan 89'; Osman 56'		Brosque 7', 78'; Baird (red card) 75'	Attendance: 5,194; Referee: Matthew Breeze

4 December 2005 Round 15	Perth Glory	2 : 2	Central Coast Mariners	Members Equity Stadium
	Ishida 65'; Ward 54'		Petrie 12'; Hutchinson 8'	Attendance: 7,428; Referee: Mark Shield

31 December 2005 Round 16	Central Coast Mariners	4 : 1	Newcastle Jets	Bluetongue Stadium
	Hutchinson 71', 82'; Brown 30'; Gumprecht 3'		Coveny 85'; Corbo (red card) 56'	Attendance: 11,612; Referee: Mark Shield

8 January 2006 Round 17	Central Coast Mariners	1 : 0	New Zealand Knights	Bluetongue Stadium
	Heffernan 90'			Attendance: 7,257; Referee: Srebre Delovski

14 January 2006 Round 18	Sydney FC	1 : 1	Central Coast Mariners	Aussie Stadium
	Carney 61'		Pondeljak 52'	Attendance: 15,977; Referee: Ben Williams

20 January 2006 Round 19	Adelaide United	1 : 1	Central Coast Mariners	Hindmarsh Stadium
	Veart 50' (pen.)		Kwasnik 54'	Attendance: 13,008; Referee: Mark Shield

27 January 2006 Round 20	Central Coast Mariners	3 : 1	Melbourne Victory	Bluetongue Stadium
	Heffernan 88'; Spencer 28', 62'		Ferrante 13'	Attendance: 11,945; Referee: Simon Przydacz

4 February 2006 Round 21	Queensland Roar	2 : 2	Central Coast Mariners	Suncorp Stadium
	Baird 60'; Brosque 3'		O'Sullivan 81'; Petrie 33'	Attendance: 13,641; Referee: Ben Williams

=== 2005-06 Finals series ===
10 February 2006 Semi-Final Leg 1	Newcastle Jets	0 : 1	Central Coast Mariners	EnergyAustralia Stadium
			Osman 76'	Attendance: 10,236; Referee: Ben Williams

17 February 2006 Semi-Final Leg 2	Central Coast Mariners	1 : 1	Newcastle Jets	Bluetongue Stadium
	Heffernan 79'		Thompson 28'	Attendance: 17,429; Referee: Simon Przydacz

26 February 2006 Preliminary Final	Adelaide United	0 : 1	Central Coast Mariners	Hindmarsh Stadium
			Pondeljak 7'	Attendance: 11,405; Referee: Matthew Breeze

5 March 2006 Grand Final	Sydney FC	1 : 0	Central Coast Mariners	Aussie Stadium
	Corica 62'			Attendance: 41,689; Referee: Mark Shield

=== Ladder ===
Pos	Team	Pld	W	D	L	GF	GA	GD	Pts	Qualification
1	Adelaide United	21	13	4	4	33	25	+8	43	Qualification for 2007 AFC Champions League group stage and Finals series
2	Sydney FC (C)	21	10	6	5	35	28	+7	36	Qualification for 2007 AFC Champions League group stage and Finals series
3	Central Coast Mariners	21	8	8	5	35	28	+7	32	Qualification for Finals series
4	Newcastle Jets	21	9	4	8	27	29	−2	31	Qualification for Finals series
5	Perth Glory	21	8	5	8	34	29	+5	29	
6	Queensland Roar	21	7	7	7	27	22	+5	28	
7	Melbourne Victory	21	7	5	9	26	24	+2	26	
8	New Zealand Knights (Note: New Zealand Knights cannot qualify for the AFC Champions League as they are not recognised as an AFC club.)	21	1	3	17	15	47	−32	6	

Source: ultimatealeague.com
Rules for classification: 1) points; 2) goal difference; 3) number of goals scored.
(C) Champions

=== Finals ===
Semifinals
Adelaide United	2	1
Sydney FC	2	2
Central Coast Mariners	1	1
Newcastle Jets	0	1

Preliminary final
Adelaide United	0
Central Coast Mariners	1

Final
Sydney FC	1
Central Coast Mariners	0

== Statistics ==
=== Goal scorers ===
Player	Goals
Stewart Petrie	8
Dean Heffernan	7
John Hutchinson	6
Noel Spencer	6
Andre Gumprecht	2
Adam Kwasnik	2

== End of Year Awards ==
- Mariners Medallist - player of the year, as voted by Club members:
  - Michael Beauchamp
- Chairman's Award - awarded for outstanding service to the club:
  - John Hutchinson and Ben Coonan (Mariners' media officer) (shared)
- Golden Boot (top goalscorer):
  - Stewart Petrie
- Jesters' Pies Marinators' Goal of the Year:
  - Noel Spencer, round 1 vs Perth Glory
- Central Coast Mariners Members Player of the Year Award:
  - Andre Gumprecht
