= List of Central Coast Mariners FC seasons =

Central Coast Mariners Football Club is an Australian association football club based on the Central Coast of New South Wales. The club was formed in 2004 under the backing of the technical director Alex Tobin and Ian Kiernan who would be the first chairman of the club. They played their first competitive match in the A-League Pre-Season Challenge Cup against Queensland Roar on the 23 July 2005 with their first league match being on the 26 August 2005 against Perth Glory which they would win 1-0. They would later go on to reach the first A-League Grand Final on 5 March 2006 before losing to Sydney FC by a single goal.

The club was formed in 2004 to be one of the original teams in the A-League, which replaced the National Soccer League. The team had great early successes, winning the first A-League Pre-Season Challenge Cup and coming second in the first A-League Championship. Lawrie McKinna was the club's first manager, for five seasons, in which time the team won an A-League Premiership and competed in the AFC Champions League.

Following McKinna's time in charge Graham Arnold was appointed as the club's head coach. Under Arnold, the side won another A-League Premiership and their first A-League Championship, as well as progressing past the group stage of the AFC Champions League for the first time.

In 2021, Nick Montgomery was appointed the head coach role, and under him the club would win another A-League Championship, as well as progressing to the Australia Cup final for the first time.

After Montgomery's tenure, Mark Jackson became the club's head coach, leading the club to a historic treble, winning the A-League Men Premiership. A-League Men Championship and AFC Cup in his first season.

The club has won the A-League Men Premiership three times, the A-League Men Championship three times, the A-League Pre-Season Challenge Cup once and the AFC Cup once. This list shows the team's competitive records since their inaugural 2005-06 season. Top scorers in bold also won the A-League Men Golden Boot that season.

== Seasons ==
Season	League									Pre-Season Cup (2005–08) FFA / Australia Cup (2014–present)	Oceania (2005) / Asia (2006–)		Top scorer	
Season	Pld	W	D	L	GF	GA	Pts	Position	Finals	Pre-Season Cup (2005–08) FFA / Australia Cup (2014–present)	Competition	Result	Player(s)	Goals
2005–06	21	8	8	5	33	28	32	3rd	**Runners-up**	**Champions**	OCL	Australian Qualifying runners-up	**Stewart Petrie**	9
2006–07	21	6	6	9	22	26	24	6th		**Runners-up**			Adam Kwasnik	9
2007–08	21	10	4	7	30	25	34	**Premiers**	**Runners-up**	4th			Sasho Petrovski	9
2008–09	21	7	7	7	35	32	28	4th	4th	Group stage	ACL	Group stage	Matt Simon	13
2009–10	27	7	9	11	32	29	30	8th					Matt Simon	7
2010–11	30	16	9	5	50	31	57	**2nd**	**Runners-up**				Matt Simon	11
2011–12	27	15	6	6	40	24	51	**Premiers**	3rd		ACL	Group stage	Patrick Zwaanswijk	8
2012–13	27	16	6	5	48	22	54	**2nd**	**Champions**		ACL	Round of 16	**Daniel McBreen**	19
2013–14	27	12	6	9	33	36	42	3rd	Semi-finals		ACL	Group stage	Bernie Ibini-Isei	6
2014–15	27	5	8	14	26	50	23	8th		Semi-finals	ACL	Qualifying play-off round	Matt Sim	5
2015–16	27	3	4	20	33	70	13	10th		Round of 32			Roy O'Donovan	8
2016–17	27	6	5	16	31	52	23	8th		Round of 32			Roy O'Donovan	11
2017–18	27	4	8	15	28	49	20	10th		Round of 32			Blake Powell, Connor Pain	4
2018–19	27	3	4	20	31	70	13	10th		Round of 32			Matt Simon	7
2019–20	26	5	3	18	26	55	18	11th		Semi-finals			Milan Đurić	5
2020–21	26	12	6	8	35	31	42	3rd	Elimination-finals				Matt Simon	10
2021–22	26	12	6	8	49	35	42	5th	Elimination-finals	**Runners-up**			Jason Cummings	10
2022–23	26	13	5	8	55	35	44	**2nd**	**Champions**	Round of 32			Jason Cummings	21
2023–24	27	17	4	6	49	27	55	**Premiers**	**Champions**	Round of 32	AFC Cup	**Champions**	Ángel Torres	15
2024–25	26	5	11	10	29	51	26	10th		Round of 32	ACL Elite	Group Stage	Mikael Doka, Alou Kuol	6
2025–26	26	8	8	10	35	42	32	9th		Playoff			Sabit Ngor	6
