= Alex Wilkinson =

Australian soccer player (born 1984)

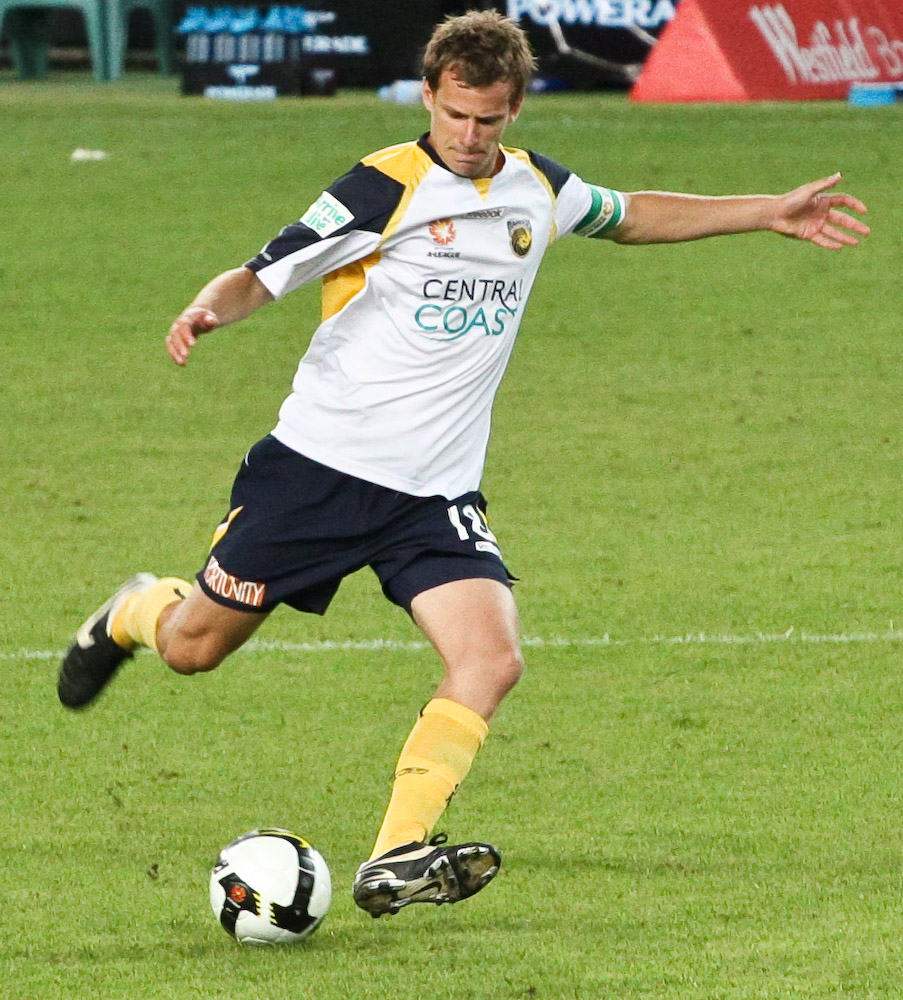
- Wilkinson with Central Coast Mariners in 2009

Personal information
- Full name: Alexander William Wilkinson
- Date of birth: 13 August 1984 (age 42)
- Place of birth: Sydney, Australia
- Height: 1.87 m (6 ft 2 in)
- Position: Central defender

Senior career*
Years	Team	Apps	(Gls)
2002–2004	Northern Spirit	45	(0)
2004	Ryde City Gunners	19	(3)
2004–2005	Manly United	15	(0)
2005–2012	Central Coast Mariners	172	(2)
2011	→ Jiangsu Sainty (loan)	10	(0)
2012–2015	Jeonbuk Hyundai Motors	86	(2)
2016	Melbourne City	10	(0)
2016–2023	Sydney FC	193	(2)

International career^{‡}
2001	Australia U-17	9	(4)
2002–2003	Australia U-20	8	(0)
2014–2015	Australia	16	(0)
Medal record
Representing Australia
Men's Association football
AFC Asian Cup
Winner	2015 Australia
OFC U-20 Championship
Winner	2002 Fiji/Vanuatu
- * Club domestic league appearances and goals as of 1 June 2023 ‡ National team caps and goals as of 17 November 2015

Alexander William Wilkinson (born 13 August 1984) is a retired Australian professional soccer player who is currently the Head of Football Operations at Sydney FC.

Wilkinson was born and raised in Sydney and made his senior debut for Northern Spirit in 2002. After moving to Ryde City Gunners and Manly United in 2004, Wilkinson joined A-League club Central Coast Mariners, where he eventually became club captain and made over 170 appearances. After spending time in China on loan to Jiangsu Sainty, Wilkinson played for Korean club Jeonbuk Hyundai Motors for 4 seasons (2012–2015), before returning to Australia to play for Melbourne City FC. After a brief stint at the club, Wilkinson moved to Sydney FC where he enjoyed the most success, and captained the side for four years until his retirement at the conclusion of the 2022–23 A-League Men season.

Wilkinson made eleven appearances for the Australian national team, including three at the 2014 FIFA World Cup.

== Club career ==
Wilkinson began playing football as a student at Ryde East Primary School, and then Epping Boys High School. His main junior football club was North Ryde and then Gladesville Hornsby/Northern Spirit youth team where he played alongside Brett Holman. In 2004, two years after Wilkinson first joined the Northern Spirit team, the National Soccer League (NSL) shut down and Wilkinson found work at a surf shop in his local Macquarie Centre.

On Sunday 12 November 2006, Noel Spencer was dropped from the starting eleven and in his absence Alex Wilkinson was named captain of the team. Spencer was then struck down with injury and Alex filled in as captain until round 18 when Spencer returned. He was named captain for Season 3 (2007–2008) and only injury has interrupted that (with ex-Socceroo Tony Vidmar and midfielder John Hutchinson filling in). On 17 March 2011 it was announced that Wilkinson had signed a short-term loan deal with Chinese side Jiangsu Sainty. On 18 July he had signed a two-and-a-half-year contract with K League 1 team Jeonbuk Hyundai Motors. The reported transfer fee paid to the Mariners upon completion of the deal is $450,000. Following a lengthy and successful stint in Asia, Wilkinson signed with Melbourne City in February 2016, for the remainder of the 2015–16 A-League season.

=== Sydney FC ===
After Melbourne City were eliminated from the finals series Wilkinson signed a two-year contract with Sydney FC, rejoining former Mariners manager Graham Arnold

In 2017, Wilkinson made sporadic appearances as captain on the pitch with skipper Alex Brosque off and vice-captain Sebastian Ryall injured for the majority of the season.

In July 2019, following the retirement of captain Brosque and after spending 3 years as vice-captain, Wilkinson was appointed captain of Sydney FC.

In August 2020, Wilkinson captained Sydney FC in their sixth A-League Grand Final, winning the championship courtesy of a Ryan Grant header in the 100th minute. Wilkinson featured in the 2021 A-League Grand Final, a 3-1 loss to Melbourne City, before featuring for two more seasons as club captain until his retirement in May 2023.

== International career ==
He represented Australia in 2003 FIFA World Youth Championship. In August 2006, Alex was selected for the first time to join the 22-man Socceroos squad, training for the Asian Cup against Kuwait. He has also joined the 37-man training squad for the Socceroos against Qatar. He made his full national team debut against Ecuador in a friendly at The New Den in London on 5 March 2014.

He was a surprise inclusion for Australia's 2014 World Cup squad and started in Australia's 3–1 opening loss to Chile. After he cleared a certain goal off the line he was the first player in history to be involved in FIFA's new goal line review system which showed he successfully saved a goal.

On 30 March 2015 in a friendly match against Macedonia, at the 72nd minute as captain Mile Jedinak was substituted off the ground, Wilkinson was handed the captain's arm band.

== Career statistics ==
As of 1 September 2022

Club	Season	League			Cup		Continental		Total	
Club	Season	Division	Apps	Goals	Apps	Goals	Apps	Goals	Apps	Goals
Northern Spirit	2002–03	National Soccer League	30	0	0	0	0	0	30	0
Northern Spirit	2003–04	National Soccer League	15	0	0	0	0	0	15	0
Northern Spirit	Total		45	0	0	0	0	0	45	0
Ryde City Gunners	2004	NSW Super League	19	3	0	0	0	0	19	3
Manly United	2004–05	NSW Premier League	15	0	0	0	0	0	15	0
Central Coast Mariners	2005–06	A-League	25	0	5	0	—		30	0
Central Coast Mariners	2006–07	A-League	21	0	6	0	—		27	0
Central Coast Mariners	2007–08	A-League	15	0	5	1	—		20	1
Central Coast Mariners	2008–09	A-League	23	0	3	0	6	0	32	0
Central Coast Mariners	2009–10	A-League	27	1	0	0	0	0	27	1
Central Coast Mariners	2010–11	A-League	34	1	0	0	0	0	34	1
Central Coast Mariners	2011–12	A-League	27	0	0	0	6	0	33	0
Central Coast Mariners	Total		172	2	19	1	12	0	203	3
Jiangsu Sainty (loan)	2011	Chinese Super League	10	0	0	0	—		10	0
Jeonbuk Hyundai Motors	2012	K League 1	15	0	0	0	0	0	15	0
Jeonbuk Hyundai Motors	2013	K League 1	25	2	4	0	2	0	31	2
Jeonbuk Hyundai Motors	2014	K League 1	25	0	1	0	8	0	34	0
Jeonbuk Hyundai Motors	2015	K League 1	21	0	1	0	8	0	23	0
Jeonbuk Hyundai Motors	Total		86	2	6	0	18	0	110	2
Melbourne City	2015–16	A-League	10	0	0	0	—		10	0
Sydney FC	2016–17	A-League	29	0	3	0	—		32	0
Sydney FC	2017–18	A-League	27	0	3	0	6	0	36	0
Sydney FC	2018–19	A-League	28	0	4	0	4	0	36	0
Sydney FC	2019–20	A-League	27	0	1	0	6	1	34	1
Sydney FC	2020–21	A-League	28	2	0	0	0	0	28	2
Sydney FC	2021–22	A-League	26	0	4	0	4	0	34	0
Sydney FC	2022-23	A-League	15	0	3	0	—		18	0
Sydney FC	Total		180	2	18	0	20	1	218	3
Career total			537	9	43	1	50	1	630	11

== Honours ==
=== Club ===
Central Coast Mariners

- A-League Premiership: 2007–08, 2011–12
- A-League Pre-Season Challenge Cup: 2005

Jeonbuk Hyundai Motors

- K League 1: 2014, 2015

Sydney FC

- A-League Premiership: 2016–17, 2017–18, 2019–20
- A-League Championship: 2016–17, 2018–19, 2019–20
- FFA Cup: 2017

=== International ===
Australia

- AFC Asian Cup: 2015

Australia U-20

- OFC U-19 Men's Championship: 2002

=== Individual ===
- K League Best XI: 2014
- PFA A-League Team of the Season: 2016–17, 2017–18, 2019–20
- Sydney FC Player of the Year: 2020–21 Sydney FC season
