= 2008 A-League Grand Final =

- Event: 2007–08 A-League
Central Coast Mariners	Newcastle Jets
0	1
- Date: 24 February 2008
- Venue: Sydney Football Stadium, Sydney, Australia
- Man of the Match: Andrew Durante, Newcastle Jets
- Referee: Mark Shield
- Attendance: 36,354

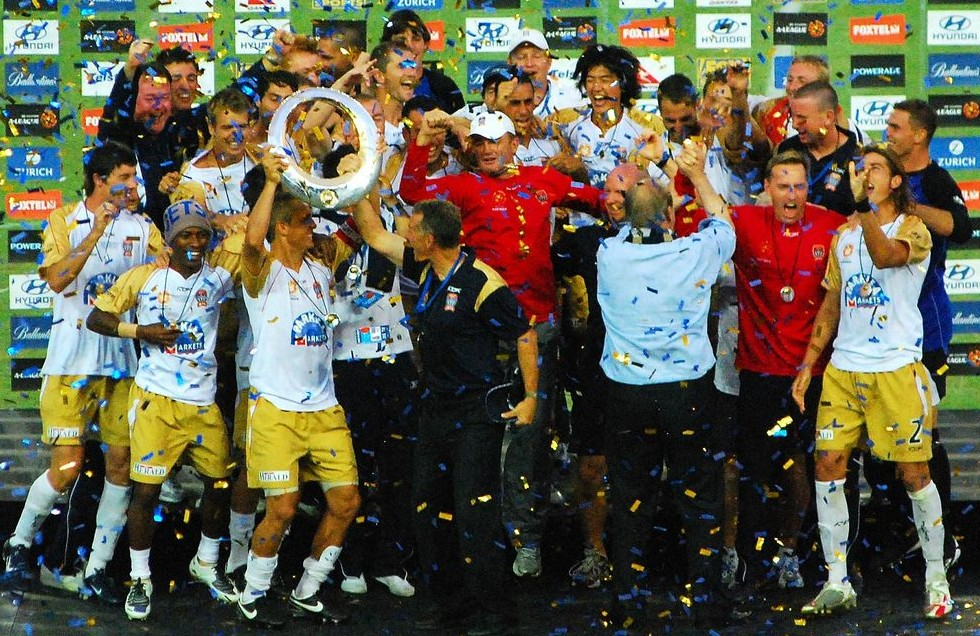
Newcastle Jets celebrating after their Grand Final victory.

The 2008 A-League Grand Final took place at Sydney Football Stadium in Sydney, Australia on 24 February 2008. It was the first A-League Grand Final played at a neutral home ground, due to Bluetongue Stadium being deemed by FFA to not have a sufficient capacity to hold the centrepiece of the A-League season. This move created a stir of controversy and was protested by the Central Coast Mariners, who won the right to host the match, but to no avail.

== Route to the finals ==
Semifinals
Central Coast Mariners	0	3
Newcastle Jets	2	0
Sydney FC	0	0
Queensland Roar	0	2

Preliminary final
Newcastle Jets (aet)	3
Queensland Roar	2

Final
Central Coast Mariners	0
Newcastle Jets	1

== Match ==
=== Summary ===
The first half of the game ended in a draw with neither side scoring a goal, though each had good scoring opportunities. Gary van Egmond made a risky change to his side's starting formation, playing with a back three. In the 64th minute Mark Bridge scored the only goal after Tony Vidmar slipped.

The game ended in controversy after Central Coast earned a corner late into extra time in the second half. As the ball was crossed into Newcastle's penalty area, it appeared to hit Newcastle player James Holland on the right arm, before it was cleared away. Mariners players immediately demanded a penalty, yet referee Mark Shield decided not to award one. The Mariners players, enraged, continued to scream at Shield, pressuring him for a penalty. Mariners keeper Danny Vukovic as a result of this frustration, hit Shields' arm away when the referee was penalizing one of Vukovic's teammates with a yellowcard. Shield then immediately awarded Vukovic with a red card. Vukovic would later be charged with striking a match official by the FFA, and was subsequently banned for 9 months, 3 of those months suspended. Due to this, Vukovic missed a significant portion of the next A-League season as well as the Olympic Games.

=== Details ===
24 February 2008
17:00 AEDT

Central Coast Mariners	0–1	Newcastle Jets
	Reports	Bridge 64'

Sydney Football Stadium, Sydney
Attendance: 36,354
Referee: Mark Shield

Central Coast Mariners	Newcastle Jets

GK	20	(Australia) Danny Vukovic	(red card) 90+4'
MF	7	(Australia) John Hutchinson
MF	12	(Australia) Greg Owens		(substituted off) 69'
DF	13	(Australia) Tony Vidmar		(substituted off) 75'
DF	16	(Australia) Nigel Boogaard	(yellow card) 90'
DF	18	(Australia) Alex Wilkinson (c)
MF	19	(Australia) Adam Kwasnik		(substituted off) 69'
FW	22	(Australia) Sasho Petrovski
MF	23	(Australia) Mile Jedinak	(yellow card) 12'
FW	25	(Australia) John Aloisi	(yellow card) 90+5'
DF	26	(Australia) Alvin Ceccoli
Substitutes:
GK	1	(Australia) Matthew Trott
FW	2	(Australia) Matt Simon		(substituted on) 75'
MF	6	(Germany) André Gumprecht		(substituted on) 69'
MF	10	(Australia) Tom Pondeljak		(substituted on) 69'
DF	15	(Australia) Andrew Clark
Manager:
(Scotland) Lawrie McKinna

GK	1	(Australia) Ante Čović
DF	2	(Australia) Adam Griffiths	(yellow card) 11'
DF	3	(Australia) Jade North (c)
MF	5	(Australia) Stuart Musialik
DF	6	(Australia) Andrew Durante
MF	8	(Australia) Matt Thompson		(substituted off) 76'
FW	9	(Australia) Joel Griffiths	(yellow card) 37'
DF	11	(Australia) Tarek Elrich
DF	13	(Australia) Adam D'Apuzzo
FW	19	(Australia) Mark Bridge	64'	(substituted off) 73'
MF	28	(South Korea) Song Jin-Hyung		(substituted off) 90+3'
Substitutes:
GK	20	(Australia) Ben Kennedy
MF	10	(Brazil) Denni		(substituted on) 90+3'
MF	18	(Australia) Noel Spencer
MF	22	(Australia) Jason Hoffman		(substituted on) 76'
MF	25	(Australia) James Holland		(substituted on) 73'
Manager:
(Australia) Gary van Egmond

Joe Marston Medal:
Andrew Durante (Newcastle Jets)

Assistant referees:
Ben Wilson
Nathan Gibson
Fourth official:
Matthew Breeze

Match rules

- 90 minutes
- 30 minutes of extra time if necessary.
- Penalty shoot-out if scores still level.

A-League
2008 Champions

Newcastle Jets
First Title

=== Statistics ===
	Central Coast	Newcastle
Attempts at goal	13	6
Attempts on target	1	3
Attempts off target	12	3
Attempts – Woodwork	0	0
Keeper saves	1	1
Ball possession	42%	58%
Corners	1	6
Fouls committed	18	15
Offsides	1	4
Yellow cards	3	2
Red cards	1	0

== See also ==
- 2007–08 A-League
- List of A-League honours
