= Tony Vidmar =

Australian soccer coach (born 1970)

Personal information
- Full name: Antony Vidmar
- Date of birth: 4 July 1970 (age 56)
- Place of birth: Adelaide, Australia
- Height: 1.86 m (6 ft 1 in)
- Position: Defender

Senior career*
Years	Team	Apps	(Gls)
1989–1995	Adelaide City	134	(15)
1993	→ Germinal Ekeren (loan)	9	(1)
1995–1997	NAC Breda	61	(4)
1997–2002	Rangers	104	(9)
2002–2003	Middlesbrough	12	(0)
2003–2005	Cardiff City	73	(2)
2005–2006	NAC Breda	21	(0)
2006–2008	Central Coast Mariners	33	(0)
Total		448	(31)

International career
1990–1992	Australia U23	18	(7)
1991–2006	Australia	76	(3)
- 2009–2012: FFSA NTC
- 2012–2017: FFA CoE
- 2013–2017: Australia U-17
- 2022–2026: Australia U23
- 2026–: Shanghai Port
Medal record
Representing Australia(as player)
Men's Association football
FIFA Confederations Cup
Runner-up	1997 Saudi Arabia
Bronze medal – third place	2001 South Korea-Japan
OFC Nations Cup
Winner	2004 Australia
Representing Australia(as manager)
WAFF U-23 Championship
Runner-up	2024 Saudi Arabia
AFF U-16 Youth Championship
Winner	2016 Cambodia
- * Club domestic league appearances and goals

Antony Vidmar (born 4 July 1970) is an Australian soccer coach and former player, who serves as an assistant coach with the Shanghai Port FC and recent coach of the country's men's under-23 team from 2022–2026.He was a member of the Australia national team, competed at the 1992 Summer Olympics in Barcelona for his native country, and with 76 caps, is one of Australia's most capped players. His brother Aurelio Vidmar is also a former footballer.

== Club career ==
Vidmar was born in Adelaide to a Slovenian father and Italian mother. His biggest impact in club football came whilst at Scottish side Rangers, for whom he played over 150 games and won the Scottish Premier League twice, the Scottish League Cup twice and the Scottish Cup three times. His goal against Italian side Parma in a UEFA Champions League qualifying round tie in 1999 cemented him a place in Rangers folklore. He left the club in 2002 and joined Middlesbrough on a free transfer.

He then joined Welsh side Cardiff City on a free transfer in 2003, with manager Lennie Lawrence being quick to sign him after missing out the previous year following his release from Rangers. Vidmar quickly became a fans favourite at Cardiff and made 73 appearances for the club before leaving in 2005 to re-sign for Dutch side NAC Breda, the club he had left to join Rangers.

== International career ==
Highly criticised as one of the main weak points in the Australia national team's defence under Frank Farina's tenure, Guus Hiddink's appointment sparked a tremendous improvement in his performance, culminating in an impressive performance in the second leg of the World Cup qualifying tie against Uruguay. Vidmar notably volunteered to take his teammate Mark Bresciano's kick in the penalty shoot-out (after the latter had been substituted through injury). This was successfully converted, giving Australia a 3–1 lead, and they subsequently won 4–2 on penalties.

On 9 May 2006, Vidmar announced he was withdrawing himself from World Cup team selection for medical reasons, specifically an irregular heart rhythm. Doctors discovered this irregularity was due to a blood clot in his left coronary artery. Following an operation in London, Vidmar was given the all-clear to resume his professional football career. Vidmar announced his international retirement after the friendly fixture against Paraguay on 7 October 2006, in which Australia drew 1–1.

== Retirement ==
On 14 February 2008, Vidmar announced his retirement and an end to his decorated playing career after the 2008 A-League Grand Final. The former Socceroo defender said he wanted to end speculation about his future and thought the domestic decider was the best way to end his career.

"There has been a lot of speculation on what I was going to do, whether to continue on or to end my career. I made up my mind about three weeks ago and thought that it was probably the right time to finish and that was well before we clinched our Grand Final berth." "My aim at the start of the season was to help qualify the team for the AFC Champions League and to top that now would be very difficult."

Vidmar said there had been many influential players on his career, which began at Adelaide City in 1989:

"There are a lot of people that I'd like to thank – when I first started in the National Soccer League my first coach Zoran Matic was a huge influence for my career and every other coach that I've had since has influenced me in some way." "I'd like to thank everyone at the Mariners – everyone in the office to the coaching staff and my team-mates, after what happened with my medical condition it was a gamble that they took to bring me here and I'd like to thank them for giving me the opportunity to finish my career in Australia, it would definitely be nice to finish it off with a Championship."

The Mariners went on to lose the Grand Final to the Newcastle Jets.

== Personal life ==
Vidmar is the father of Kane Vidmar and Mikayla Vidmar, who are both footballers. His brother, Aurelio Vidmar was also a former footballer and current football manager.

== Career statistics ==
=== Club ===
Appearances and goals by club, season and competition
Club	Season	League			National cup		Continental		Other (Note: Includes Football League Cup, Scottish League Cup, A-League Pre-Season Challenge Cup)		Total	
Club	Season	Division	Apps	Goals	Apps	Goals	Apps	Goals	Apps	Goals	Apps	Goals
Adelaide City	1989	National Soccer League	10	1							10	1
Adelaide City	1989–90	National Soccer League	26	4							26	4
Adelaide City	1990–91	National Soccer League	23	3	3	0					26	3
Adelaide City	1991–92	National Soccer League	20	1	4	0					24	1
Adelaide City	1992–93	National Soccer League	4	1							4	1
Adelaide City	Total		83	10	7	0	0	0	0	0	90	10
Germinal Beerschot	1992–93	Belgian First Division	9	1							9	1
Adelaide City	1993–94	National Soccer League	22	3	4	1					26	4
Adelaide City	1994–95	National Soccer League	22	1	2	0					24	1
Adelaide City	Total		127	14	13	1	0	0	0	0	140	15
NAC Breda	1995–96	Eredivisie	30	2							30	2
NAC Breda	1996–97	Eredivisie	31	2							31	1
NAC Breda	Total		61	4	0	0	0	0	0	0	61	4
Rangers	1997–98	Scottish Premier Division	12	0			2	0			14	0
Rangers	1998–99	Scottish Premier League	28	1	1	1	4	0			33	2
Rangers	1999–2000	Scottish Premier League	27	6	1	1	5	0			33	7
Rangers	2000–01	Scottish Premier League	15	1	1	0	3	0			19	1
Rangers	2001–02	Scottish Premier League	22	1	4	0	5	0	3	0	34	1
Rangers	Total		104	9	7	2	19	0	3	0	133	11
Middlesbrough	2002–03	Premier League	12	0	1	0			2	0	15	0
Cardiff City	2003–04	First Division	45	1	1	0			2	0	48	1
Cardiff City	2004–05	First Division	28	1	1	0			4	0	33	1
Cardiff City	Total		73	2	2	0	0	0	6	0	81	2
NAC Breda	2005–06	Eredivisie	21	0							21	0
Central Coast Mariners	2006–07	A-League	15	0					2	0	17	0
Central Coast Mariners	2007–08	A-League	15	0	3	0			3	0	21	0
Central Coast Mariners	Total		30	0	3	0	0	0	5	0	48	0
Career total			437	34	26	3	19	0	16	0	498	39

=== International ===
Appearances and goals by national team and year
National team	Year	Apps	Goals
Australia	1991	2	0
Australia	1992	5	0
Australia	1993	6	0
Australia	1994	6	0
Australia	1995	4	1
Australia	1996	1	0
Australia	1997	13	0
Australia	1998	0	0
Australia	1999	0	0
Australia	2000	3	0
Australia	2001	13	1
Australia	2002	0	0
Australia	2003	3	0
Australia	2004	10	1
Australia	2005	9	0
Australia	2006	1	0
Total		76	3

Scores and results list Australia's goal tally first, score column indicates score after each Vidmar goal.

List of international goals scored by Tony Vidmar
No.	Date	Venue	Opponent	Score	Result	Competition
1	18 June 1995	Sydney Football Stadium, Sydney, Australia	Ghana	1–0	2–1	Friendly
2	9 April 2001	BCU International Stadium, Coffs Harbour, Australia	Tonga	16–0	22–0	2002 FIFA World Cup qualifying
3	12 October 2004	Sydney Football Stadium, Sydney, Australia	Solomon Islands	3–0	6–0	2004 OFC Nations Cup

== Managerial statistics ==
As of match played 21 April 2024

Managerial record by team and tenure
Team	From	To	Record							
Team	From	To	G	W	D	L	GF	GA	GD	Win %
Australia U23	11 May 2022	Present	16	7	3	6	33	24	+9	43.75
Total			16	7	3	6	33	24	+9	43.75

== Honours ==
=== Player ===
Adelaide City

- NSL Championship: 1991–92, 1993–94
- NSL Cup: 1989, 1991–92

Rangers

- Scottish Premier League: 1998–99, 1999–2000
- Scottish Cup: 1998–99, 1999–2000, 2001–02
- Scottish League Cup: 1998–99, 2001–02

Central Coast Mariners

- A-League Premiership: 2007–08

Australia

- FIFA Confederations Cup: runner-up 1997; 3rd place, 2001
- OFC Nations Cup: 2004

Individual

- FFA Hall of Fame: 2009
- FFA Team of the Decade: 2000–13
- FFA Team of the Century

=== Manager ===
Australia U-23

- WAFF U-23 Championship: runner-up 2024

Australia U-16

- AFF U-16 Championship: 2016
