= QNI North Queensland Trophy =

- Founded: 2006
- Country: Australia
- Number of clubs: 4

The QNI North Queensland Challenge Trophy was a football (soccer) friendly tournament the summer of 2006, hosted in Townsville.

== Overview ==
The tournament was intended to warm up the Young Socceroos for the 2007 U-20 World Cup. The Young Socceroos were automatically invited to the tournament as hosts. Central Coast Mariners and Melbourne Victory were then invited to the tournament to represent the A-League and Changchun Yatai of the Chinese Super League were invited to represent Asia.

== Teams that participated ==
- Young Socceroos
- Central Coast Mariners
- Melbourne Victory
- Changchun Yatai

== Tournament ==
Each team played each other once in a round robin, after each team had played each other, the team that came 1st in the group played the team that came 2nd in the Grand Final, and the teams that finished 3rd and 4th played each other in a consolation match. Melbourne Victory finished 1st in the group followed by Changchun Yatai while the Young Socceroos and Central Coast Mariners finished 3rd and 4th respectively. Melbourne then played Changchun in the Grand Final where Melbourne finished the game 6-1 and broke the club record for biggest win.

== Summary ==
=== Group Round ===
- Melbourne Victory 3-1 Changchun Yatai
- Young Socceroos 1-2 Central Coast Mariners
- Changchun Yatai 2-0 Central Coast Mariners
- Young Socceroos 0-4 Melbourne Victory
- Central Coast Mariners 1-3 Melbourne Victory
- Young Socceroos 1-4 Changchun Yatai

=== Consolation Match ===
- Central Coast Mariners 2-0 Young Socceroos

=== Grand Final ===
Year	Crowd	Grand Final		
Year	Crowd	Winner	Score	Runner-Up
2006	5,234	Melbourne Victory	6–1	Changchun Yatai

=== Overall Results ===
Year	Venue	Winner	Runner-up	3rd place	4th place
2006	Rockhampton Stadium	(Australia) Melbourne Victory	(China) Changchun Yatai	(Australia) Central Coast Mariners	(Australia) Young Socceroos
