= Adam Kwasnik =

Australian soccer player

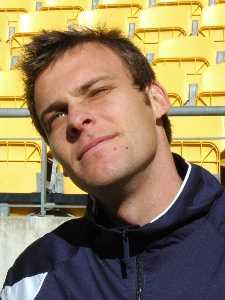
- Kwasnik in 2008

Personal information
- Full name: Adam John Kwasnik
- Date of birth: 31 May 1983 (age 43)
- Place of birth: Sydney, Australia
- Height: 1.79 m (5 ft 10 1/2 in)
- Position: Forward

Senior career*
| Years | Team | Apps | (Gls) |
| 2000–2001 | Blacktown City Demons | 6 | (2) |
| 2001–2002 | Parramatta Power | 10 | (3) |
| 2002–2004 | Northern Spirit | 49 | (9) |
| 2004 | Manly United | 4 | (5) |
| 2004–2005 | Blacktown City Demons | 10 | (7) |
| 2005–2008 | Central Coast Mariners | 62 | (15) |
| 2008–2009 | Wellington Phoenix | 12 | (0) |
| 2009–2014 | Central Coast Mariners | 74 | (20) |
| 2009 | → Blacktown City Demons (loan) | 24 | (7) |
| 2011 | → Chengdu Blades (loan) | 15 | (5) |
| Total | | 166 | (73) |

International career^{‡}
| 2002 | Australia U20 | 1 | (0) |
- * Club domestic league appearances and goals as of 2 December 2013 ‡ National team caps and goals as of 31 October 2010

Adam Kwasnik (born 31 May 1983) is an Australian former professional association football player who played as a striker.

== Club career ==
Kwasnik was part of the inaugural Central Coast Mariners squad in 2005–06, and was a substitute in the final that the Mariners lost 1–0. He was the leading Mariners goalscorer with seven goals in a disappointing campaign in 2006–07 for the Mariners. Kwasnik was scorer of the 200th goal in the A-League on 20 January 2006. Kwasnik started in the 2008 A-League Grand Final that the Mariners lost 1–0.

'Kwas', as he is known to teammates and fans alike, is second on the Mariners all-time leading goalscorers list with 35 goals from 136. He also had his own superstition of training with one sock around his ankle and the other pulled up to his knee.

Kwasnik made the move to Wellington Phoenix for the 2008–2009 season. After a disappointing season at the Phoenix, Kwasnik signed on 9 February 2009 with his former club Central Coast Mariners for the upcoming 2009 AFC Champions League and also for the 2009–10 A-League season.

Kwasnik was loaned out to Chinese Super League club and Mariners sister club Chengdu Blades during the 2010–11 off-season. He debuted in the season opener against Shandong Luneng and equalized to make it 3–3. The game would finish 3–3.

After injuries caused limited playing time in the Mariners' Championship winning season of 2012–13 and a new injury halted his 2013–14 season, Kwasnik announced his retirement. He is currently involved with youth clinics in the Central Coast area and still associated with the Mariners.

== Honours ==
=== Club ===
Central Coast Mariners:

- A-League Premiership: 2007–2008, 2011–2012
- A-League Championship: 2012–13

=== Country ===
Australia

- OFC U-20 Championship: 2002
