= Ian McAndrew =

Australian soccer player

Personal information
- Full name: Ian McAndrew
- Date of birth: 23 February 1989 (age 37)
- Place of birth: Gosford, Australia
- Height: 1.75 m (5 ft 9 in)
- Position: Central midfielder

Team information
- Current team: Wyoming FC

Youth career
- Wyoming FC
- Central Coast Lakers
- Central Coast Coasties

Senior career*
Years	Team	Apps	(Gls)
2005	Wyoming FC		
2006–2007	Central Coast Lightning		
2007–2008	Central Coast Mariners	1	(0)
2010	Wyoming FC		
2011–2013	Mounties Wanderers		
2013–2018	Gosford City		
2018	Central Coast United	12	(0)

International career
2010	Australia (futsal)	2	(0)

Managerial career
- 2015–2018: Wyoming FC
- 2018–: Wyoming FC
- * Club domestic league appearances and goals as of 4 October 2018

Ian McAndrew (born 23 February 1989 in Gosford, New South Wales) is an Australian footballer. He also represented the Australian Futsalroos at the 2010 Asian Cup in Uzbekistan, earning 3 caps. His only appearance in the A-League came against the Wellington Phoenix at Westpac Stadium in October 2007. McAndrew continues to play local football on the Central Coast and has been on the fringes of the Australian futsal team. Recently McAndrew's Gosford Premier League Squad achieved much success with Premier League and Reserve Grade winning League Champions and 3rd Grade being crowned Premiers.

== Honours ==
With Central Coast Mariners FC:

- (Australia) A-League Premiership: 2007-2008

With Gosford City FC:

- (Australia) Central Coast First Division Premiership and Promotion Central Coast First Division 2012
