= Leo Carle =

Australian football and futsal player

Personal information
- Full name: Leo Carle
- Date of birth: 6 June 1980 (age 46)
- Place of birth: Sydney, Australia
- Position: Central midfielder

Senior career*
Years	Team	Apps	(Gls)
1994	APIA	1	(0)
1997	Sydney Olympic	17	(3)
1997–1999	St George Saints	?	(?)
2000	Nacional	?	(?)
2000–2001	Rockdale City Suns	?	(?)
2001	Fairfield Bulls	8	(2)
2001–2002	Bankstown City Lions	10	(3)
2001–2002	Rockdale City Suns	?	(?)
2002–2003	FC Bossy Liverpool	29	(13)
2004	Marconi Stallions	?	(?)
2004–2005	Central Coast Mariners FC	6	(0)
2005–2006	Parramatta FC	?	(?)
2006	Rockdale City Suns	?	(16)
2006	Blacktown City Demons	?	(2)
2007–2008	Bonnyrigg White Eagles	?	(4)
2008–2009	Wollongong United	?	(?)

International career
1998	Australia U23	1	(1)
- Australia (beach soccer)
- * Club domestic league appearances and goals as of 14 June 2008

Leo Carle (born 6 June 1980 in Sydney, New South Wales, Australia) is an Australian football and Futsal player currently playing for AC United in the Southern Districts Football Association Premier League Competition. Carle plays predominantly as an attacking midfielder. He is a former captain of the Australian national futsal team.

Carle has played in the Australian A-League for Central Coast Mariners and for Club Nacional de Football in Uruguay.

== Personal life ==
He is the elder brother of former Socceroo Nick Carle, and they are of Chilean and Uruguayan descent.
