= Russell Woodruffe =

Australian soccer player

Personal information
- Full name: Russell Woodruffe
- Date of birth: 8 November 1985 (age 40)
- Place of birth: Brisbane, Queensland, Australia
- Height: 1.81 m (5 ft 11 1/2 in)
- Position: Striker

Team information
- Current team: Burleigh Heads
- Number: 8

Senior career*
Years	Team	Apps	(Gls)
2002–2003	Northern Spirit	0	(0)
2005–2006	Central Coast Mariners	5	(0)
2006	Parramatta Eagles		
2007–2008	Brisbane Strikers FC		
2009–2011	Redlands United		
2012	Eastern Suburbs		
2013–2014	Western Pride	24	(10)
2014–2015	Redlands United	41	(6)
2016	Olympic FC	1	(0)
2016–2017	Redlands United	20	(0)
2018–	Burleigh Heads		

International career^{‡}
2005	Australia U-20	2	(0)
- * Club domestic league appearances and goals as of 8 March 2019 ‡ National team caps and goals as of 19 September 2015

Russell Woodruffe (born 8 November 1985) is an Australian footballer who plays for Redlands United.

He has represented the Australian under 20 team and the under 23 side.

== Playing career ==
=== Club ===
In May 2005, Woodruffe was signed by Central Coast Mariners for the inaugural A-League season.

In 2014, Woodruffe moved into a dual player-coach role with Redlands United.
