= List of A-League Men honours =

This is a list of A-League Men honours achieved since the inaugural season of the league. The following details honours won by A-League Men clubs and those awarded to players, managers and referees of the competition.

== Club honours ==
=== Premiers ===
The club that finishes first on the A-League Men table is crowned premiers.

Season	Premiers	Runners-up
2005–06	Adelaide United	Sydney FC
2006–07	Melbourne Victory	Adelaide United
2007–08	Central Coast Mariners	Newcastle Jets
2008–09	Melbourne Victory (2)	Adelaide United
2009–10	Sydney FC	Melbourne Victory
2010–11	Brisbane Roar	Central Coast Mariners
2011–12	Central Coast Mariners (2)	Brisbane Roar
2012–13	Western Sydney Wanderers	Central Coast Mariners
2013–14	Brisbane Roar (2)	Western Sydney Wanderers
2014–15	Melbourne Victory (3)	Sydney FC
2015–16	Adelaide United (2)	Western Sydney Wanderers
2016–17	Sydney FC (2)	Melbourne Victory
2017–18	Sydney FC (3)	Newcastle Jets
2018–19	Perth Glory	Sydney FC
2019–20	Sydney FC (4)	Melbourne City
2020–21	Melbourne City	Sydney FC
2021–22	Melbourne City (2)	Melbourne Victory
2022–23	Melbourne City (3)	Central Coast Mariners
2023–24	Central Coast Mariners (3)	Wellington Phoenix
2024–25	Auckland FC	Melbourne City
2025–26	Newcastle Jets	Adelaide United

=== Champions ===
The club that wins the A-League Men Grand Final in the finals series is crowned champions.

Grand Final	Champions	Runners-up
2006	Sydney FC	Central Coast Mariners
2007	Melbourne Victory	Adelaide United
2008	Newcastle Jets	Central Coast Mariners
2009	Melbourne Victory (2)	Adelaide United
2010	Sydney FC (2)	Melbourne Victory
2011	Brisbane Roar	Central Coast Mariners
2012	Brisbane Roar (2)	Perth Glory
2013	Central Coast Mariners	Western Sydney Wanderers
2014	Brisbane Roar (3)	Western Sydney Wanderers
2015	Melbourne Victory (3)	Sydney FC
2016	Adelaide United	Western Sydney Wanderers
2017	Sydney FC (3)	Melbourne Victory
2018	Melbourne Victory (4)	Newcastle Jets
2019	Sydney FC (4)	Perth Glory
2020	Sydney FC (5)	Melbourne City
2021	Melbourne City	Sydney FC
2022	Western United	Melbourne City
2023	Central Coast Mariners (2)	Melbourne City
2024	Central Coast Mariners (3)	Melbourne Victory
2025	Melbourne City (2)	Melbourne Victory
2026	Auckland FC	Sydney FC

=== Summary ===
Club	Regular season		Finals series	
Club	Premiers	Runners-up	Champions	Runners-up
**Sydney FC**	4	4	5	3
**Melbourne Victory**	3	3	4	4
**Central Coast Mariners**	3	3	3	3
**Melbourne City**	3	2	2	3
**Brisbane Roar**	2	1	3	
**Adelaide United**	2	3	1	2
**Newcastle Jets**	1	2	1	1
**Auckland FC**	1		1	
**Western Sydney Wanderers**	1	2		3
**Perth Glory**	1			2
Western United			1	
**Wellington Phoenix**		1		
**Macarthur FC**				
Gold Coast United				
North Queensland Fury				
New Zealand Knights				
**Bold** denotes current A-League clubs.

=== Fair Play Award ===
The Fair Play Award goes to the team with the fewest points on the fair play ladder at the conclusion of the regular season.

1 point	Yellow card
2 points	Second caution Red card
3 points	Direct red card

Year	Club
2005–06	Perth Glory
2006–07	Perth Glory
2007–08	Newcastle Jets
2008–09	Brisbane Roar
2009–10	Sydney FC
2010–11	Brisbane Roar
2011–12	Brisbane Roar
2012–13	Brisbane Roar
2013–14	Brisbane Roar
2014–15	Wellington Phoenix
2015–16	Brisbane Roar
2016–17	Central Coast Mariners
2017–18	Sydney FC
2018–19	Sydney FC
2019–20	Sydney FC
2020–21	Brisbane Roar
2021–22	Not announced
2022–23	Brisbane Roar
2023–24	Newcastle Jets
2024–25	Adelaide United
2025–26	Newcastle Jets

== Individual honours ==
=== Johnny Warren Medal ===
The Johnny Warren Medal, named after the late former Socceroo and media advocate Johnny Warren, is presented to the player who is deemed to be the best player overall at the end of the season as judged by his fellow players. Each player in the A-League Men votes three times over the season; after Round 9, Round 18 and Round 27. Players are not allowed to vote for players from their own team. The format was changed for the 2015–16 season, with a panel featuring former players, media, referees and technical staff, who voted on each regular-season match.

Year	Player	Club
2005–06	(Australia) Bobby Despotovski	Perth Glory
2006–07	(Australia) Nick Carle	Newcastle Jets
2007–08	(Australia) Joel Griffiths	Newcastle Jets
2008–09	(New Zealand) Shane Smeltz	Wellington Phoenix
2009–10	(Costa Rica) Carlos Hernández	Melbourne Victory
2010–11	(Argentina) Marcos Flores	Adelaide United
2011–12	(Germany) Thomas Broich	Brisbane Roar
2012–13	(New Zealand) Marco Rojas	Melbourne Victory
2013–14	(Germany) Thomas Broich	Brisbane Roar
2014–15	(Australia) Nathan Burns	Wellington Phoenix
2015–16	(Spain) Diego Castro	Perth Glory
2016–17	(Serbia) Miloš Ninković	Sydney FC
2017–18	(Poland) Adrian Mierzejewski	Sydney FC
2018–19	(Fiji) Roy Krishna	Wellington Phoenix
2019–20	(Italy) Alessandro Diamanti	Western United
2020–21	(Serbia) Miloš Ninković (Mexico) Ulises Dávila	Sydney FC; Wellington Phoenix
2021–22	(Australia) Jake Brimmer	Melbourne Victory
2022–23	(Australia) Craig Goodwin	Adelaide United
2023–24	(Australia) Josh Nisbet	Central Coast Mariners
2024–25	(Australia) Nicolas Milanovic	Western Sydney Wanderers
2025–26	(Spain) Juan Mata	Melbourne Victory

=== Joe Marston Medal ===
The Joe Marston Medal is given to the best player in an A-League Men Grand Final. It is named after Joe Marston, an Australian national player in the 1950s.

Year	Player	Club
2006	(Trinidad and Tobago) Dwight Yorke	Sydney FC
2007	(Australia) Archie Thompson	Melbourne Victory
2008	(Australia) Andrew Durante	Newcastle Jets
2009	(Australia) Tom Pondeljak	Melbourne Victory
2010	(Australia) Simon Colosimo	Sydney FC
2011	(Australia) Mathew Ryan	Central Coast Mariners
2012	(Australia) Jacob Burns	Perth Glory
2013	(Australia) Daniel McBreen	Central Coast Mariners
2014	(Germany) Thomas Broich (Italy) Iacopo La Rocca	Brisbane Roar; Western Sydney Wanderers
2015	(Australia) Mark Milligan	Melbourne Victory
2016	(Spain) Isaías	Adelaide United
2017	(North Macedonia) Daniel Georgievski	Melbourne Victory
2018	(Australia) Lawrence Thomas	Melbourne Victory
2019	(Serbia) Miloš Ninković	Sydney FC
2020	(Australia) Rhyan Grant	Sydney FC
2021	(Australia) Nathaniel Atkinson	Melbourne City
2022	(Serbia) Aleksandar Prijović	Western United
2023	(Australia) Jason Cummings	Central Coast Mariners
2024	(England) Ryan Edmondson	Central Coast Mariners
2025	(Australia) Mathew Leckie	Melbourne City
2026	(New Zealand) Cameron Howieson	Auckland FC

=== Golden Boot ===
The Golden Boot is presented to the player who scores the most goals during the season. Only matches in the regular season are counted.

Year	Player/s	Club	Goals
2005–06	(Australia) Alex Brosque (Australia) Bobby Despotovski (Scotland) Stewart Petrie (Australia) Archie Thompson	Brisbane Roar; Perth Glory; Central Coast Mariners; Melbourne Victory	8
2006–07	(Australia) Daniel Allsopp	Melbourne Victory	11
2007–08	(Australia) Joel Griffiths	Newcastle Jets	12
2008–09	(New Zealand) Shane Smeltz	Wellington Phoenix	12
2009–10	(New Zealand) Shane Smeltz	Gold Coast United	19
2010–11	(Indonesia) Sergio van Dijk	Adelaide United	16
2011–12	(Albania) Besart Berisha	Brisbane Roar	19
2012–13	(Australia) Daniel McBreen	Central Coast Mariners	17
2013–14	(Australia) Adam Taggart	Newcastle Jets	16
2014–15	(Austria) Marc Janko	Sydney FC	16
2015–16	(Uruguay) Bruno Fornaroli	Melbourne City	23
2016–17	(Kosovo) Besart Berisha (Australia) Jamie Maclaren	Melbourne Victory; Brisbane Roar	19
2017–18	(Brazil) Bobô	Sydney FC	27
2018–19	(Fiji) Roy Krishna	Wellington Phoenix	18
2019–20	(Australia) Jamie Maclaren	Melbourne City	22
2020–21	(Australia) Jamie Maclaren	Melbourne City	25
2021–22	(Australia) Jamie Maclaren	Melbourne City	15
2022–23	(Australia) Jamie Maclaren	Melbourne City	24
2023–24	(Australia) Adam Taggart	Perth Glory	20
2024–25	(Australia) Archie Goodwin (Australia) Adrian Segecic	Adelaide United; Sydney FC	13
2025–26	(England) Sam Cosgrove (Australia) Luka Jovanović	Auckland FC; Adelaide United	11

=== Coach of the Year ===
Year	Name	Club
2005–06	(Scotland) Lawrie McKinna	Central Coast Mariners
2006–07	(Scotland) Ernie Merrick	Melbourne Victory
2007–08	(Australia) Gary van Egmond	Newcastle Jets
2008–09	(Australia) Aurelio Vidmar	Adelaide United
2009–10	(Scotland) Ernie Merrick	Melbourne Victory
2010–11	(Australia) Ange Postecoglou	Brisbane Roar
2011–12	(Australia) Graham Arnold	Central Coast Mariners
2012–13	(Australia) Tony Popovic	Western Sydney Wanderers
2013–14	(England) Mike Mulvey	Brisbane Roar
2014–15	(Australia) Kevin Muscat	Melbourne Victory
2015–16	(Spain) Guillermo Amor	Adelaide United
2016–17	(Australia) Graham Arnold	Sydney FC
2017–18	(Australia) Graham Arnold	Sydney FC
2018–19	(Australia) Tony Popovic	Perth Glory
2019–20	(France) Erick Mombaerts	Melbourne City
2020–21	(Australia) Patrick Kisnorbo	Melbourne City
2021–22	(Australia) Tony Popovic	Melbourne Victory
2022–23	(Australia) Carl Veart	Adelaide United
2023–24	(England) Mark Jackson	Central Coast Mariners
2024–25	(Australia) Steve Corica	Auckland FC
2025–26	(Australia) Mark Milligan	Newcastle Jets

=== Young Footballer of the Year ===
The Young Footballer of the Year award is awarded to a youth (under 23) player judged by a panel of experts to be the best young performer throughout the season.

Year	Player	Club
2005–06	(Australia) Nick Ward	Perth Glory
2006–07	(Australia) Adrian Leijer	Melbourne Victory
2007–08	(Australia) Bruce Djite	Adelaide United
2008–09	(Australia) Scott Jamieson	Adelaide United
2009–10	(Australia) Tommy Oar	Brisbane Roar
2010–11	(Australia) Mathew Ryan	Central Coast Mariners
2011–12	(Australia) Mathew Ryan	Central Coast Mariners
2012–13	(New Zealand) Marco Rojas	Melbourne Victory
2013–14	(Australia) Adam Taggart	Newcastle Jets
2014–15	(Australia) James Jeggo	Adelaide United
2015–16	(Australia) Jamie Maclaren	Brisbane Roar
2016–17	(Australia) Jamie Maclaren	Brisbane Roar
2017–18	(Australia) Daniel Arzani	Melbourne City
2018–19	(Australia) Chris Ikonomidis	Perth Glory
2019–20	(Australia) Riley McGree	Adelaide United
2020–21	(Australia) Joel King	Sydney FC
2021–22	(Australia) Angus Thurgate	Newcastle Jets
2022–23	(Australia) Jordan Bos	Melbourne City
2023–24	(Australia) Nestory Irankunda (New Zealand) Alex Paulsen	Adelaide United; Wellington Phoenix
2024–25	(Australia) Archie Goodwin	Adelaide United
2025–26	(Australia) Eli Adams	Newcastle Jets

=== Goalkeeper of the Year ===
Year	Player	Club
2005–06	(Australia) Clint Bolton	Sydney FC
2006–07	(Australia) Michael Theoklitos	Melbourne Victory
2007–08	(Australia) Michael Theoklitos	Melbourne Victory
2008–09	(Australia) Eugene Galekovic	Adelaide United
2009–10	(Australia) Eugene Galekovic	Adelaide United
2010–11	(Australia) Michael Theoklitos	Brisbane Roar
2011–12	(Australia) Mathew Ryan	Central Coast Mariners
2012–13	(Australia) Ante Covic	Western Sydney Wanderers
2013–14	(Australia) Eugene Galekovic	Adelaide United
2014–15	(Australia) Eugene Galekovic	Adelaide United
2015–16	(Denmark) Thomas Sørensen	Melbourne City
2016–17	(Australia) Danny Vukovic	Sydney FC
2017–18	(England) Jamie Young	Brisbane Roar
2018–19	(Poland) Filip Kurto	Wellington Phoenix
2019–20	(Australia) Andrew Redmayne	Sydney FC
2020–21	(Australia) Mark Birighitti (Australia) Andrew Redmayne	Central Coast Mariners; Sydney FC
2021–22	(Australia) Mark Birighitti	Central Coast Mariners
2022–23	(Australia) Lawrence Thomas	Western Sydney Wanderers
2023–24	(New Zealand) Alex Paulsen	Wellington Phoenix
2024–25	(New Zealand) Alex Paulsen	Auckland FC
2025–26	(Australia) Harrison Devenish-Meares	Sydney FC

=== Goal of the Year ===
Year	Player/s	Club
2009–10	(Costa Rica) Carlos Hernández	Melbourne Victory
2010–11	(Australia) Erik Paartalu	Brisbane Roar
2011–12	(Costa Rica) Carlos Hernández	Melbourne Victory
2012–13	(Argentina) Marcos Flores	Melbourne Victory
2013–14	(Netherlands) Orlando Engelaar	Melbourne City
2014–15	(Australia) Tarek Elrich	Adelaide United
2015–16	(Republic of Ireland) Roy O'Donovan	Central Coast Mariners
2016–17	(Australia) Tim Cahill	Melbourne City
2017–18	(Australia) Andrew Nabbout	Newcastle Jets
2018–19	(France) Éric Bauthéac	Brisbane Roar
2019–20	(Australia) Nikolai Topor-Stanley	Newcastle Jets
2020–21	(Republic of Ireland) Andy Keogh	Perth Glory
2021–22	(Australia) Ben Garuccio	Western United
2022–23	(Australia) Giordano Colli	Perth Glory
2023–24	(Australia) Bruno Fornaroli	Melbourne Victory
2024–25	(Australia) Jordan Lauton	Western United
2025–26	(Costa Rica) Youstin Salas	Brisbane Roar

=== Referee of the Year ===
Year	Referee
2005–06	(Australia) Mark Shield
2006–07	(Australia) Mark Shield
2007–08	(Australia) Mark Shield
2008–09	(Australia) Matthew Breeze
2009–10	(Australia) Strebre Delovski
2010–11	(Australia) Matthew Breeze
2011–12	(Australia) Jarred Gillett
2012–13	(Australia) Peter Green
2013–14	(Australia) Peter Green
2014–15	(Australia) Jarred Gillett
2015–16	(Australia) Jarred Gillett
2016–17	(Australia) Jarred Gillett
2017–18	(Australia) Jarred Gillett
2018–19	(Australia) Shaun Evans
2019–20	(Australia) Chris Beath
2020–21	(Australia) Chris Beath
2021–22	(Australia) Alex King
2022–23	(Australia) Chris Beath
2023–24	(Australia) Alex King
2024–25	(Australia) Adam Kersey
2025–26	(Australia) Alex King

== See also ==
- A-League all-time records
- A-League Pre-Season Challenge Cup
