= Damien Brown (soccer) =

Australian soccer player

Personal information
- Full name: Damien Brown
- Date of birth: 12 January 1975 (age 51)
- Place of birth: Gosford, Australia
- Height: 1.76 m (5 ft 9 1/2 in)
- Position: Left midfielder

Youth career
- 1980–1987: The Entrance
- 1986–1991: Central Coast
- 1993: Central Coast

Senior career*
Years	Team	Apps	(Gls)
1992	The Entrance		
1994–1995	Central Coast		
1995–1996	Newcastle Breakers	16	(2)
1996–1997	Central Coast	20	(8)
1997–1998	Canberra Cosmos	16	(1)
1998–2000	Blacktown City	75	(13)
2000–2003	Parramatta Power	53	(5)
2003–2004	Newcastle United	13	(0)
2005–2008	Central Coast Mariners	40	(1)
2010	The Entrance		
2011–2013	Lake Macquarie City	48	(2)
- * Club domestic league appearances and goals

Damien Brown (born 12 January 1975) is an Australian retired professional footballer.

Born in Gosford, Brown played youth football with The Entrance and Central Coast, before making his senior debut for The Entrance in 1992. He later spent several seasons in the National Soccer League before joining hometown side Central Coast Mariners for the first three seasons of the A-League.

== Early life ==
Brown was born in Gosford, on the Central Coast of New South Wales. He attended St Edward's College, East Gosford until 1990. From 1991 to 1992, he attended St Peter's Catholic College, Tuggerah.

== Playing career ==
=== Early years ===
Brown first played youth football on the Central Coast for The Entrance, before being selected for Central Coast in 1986. He remained with the club until 1997, with the exception of seasons spent at The Entrance (whilst completing his Higher School Certificate) and Newcastle Breakers in the National Soccer League in 1995–96. He spent the next several years playing for various clubs in the National Soccer League and NSW Super League sides.

=== Central Coast Mariners ===
In November 2004, Brown joined newly-formed hometown club Central Coast Mariners to play in the inaugural A-League season. He scored what was his only A-League goal in a 4–1 F3 Derby win over his former club, Newcastle Jets on 31 December 2005. In April 2007, Brown signed a further one-year deal with the Mariners for the 2007–08 season. In early June 2008, Brown announced his retirement from professional football; and that he would be staying with the Mariners in a youth development role.

Brown returned to state football with Lake Macquarie City in the Northern NSW Football State League in 2011, along with fellow former Mariners Andre Gumprecht and Wayne O'Sullivan. The move saw him play against the Mariners in a friendly in September 2011.

In 2012, the "Damien Brown Medal" was created by the Central Coast Men of Football, to be awarded to the best Mariners player each season as voted for by the group's members.

== Honours ==
=== Club ===
Blacktown City:

- NSW Super League Premiership: 2000
- NSW Super League Championship: 2000

Central Coast Mariners:

- A-League Premiership: 2007–08
- A-League Pre-Season Challenge Cup: 2005

The Entrance:

- Central Coast Football Premiership: 2010
- Central Coast Football Championship: 2010

=== Individual ===
- Central Coast Football Hall of Fame: 2013

== See also ==
- List of Central Coast Mariners FC players
