= Paul O'Grady (soccer) =

Australian soccer player

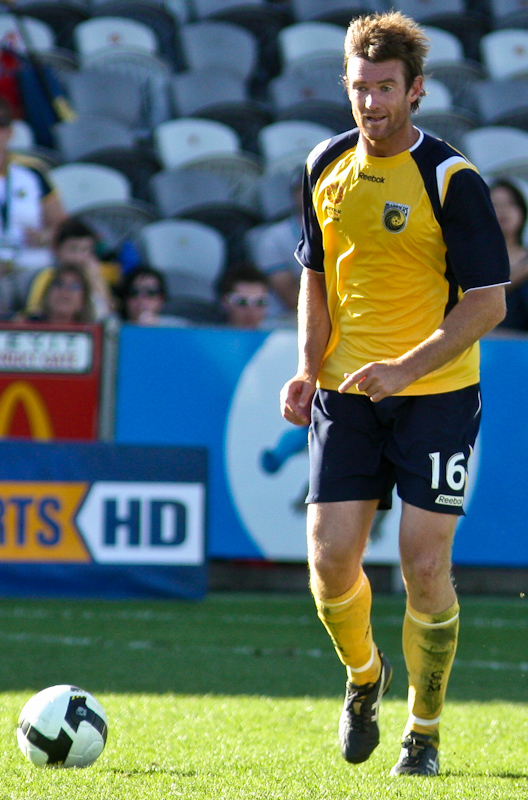
- O'Grady playing for Central Coast Mariners in 2008.

Personal information
- Full name: Paul James O'Grady
- Date of birth: 6 November 1978 (age 48)
- Place of birth: Sydney, Australia
- Height: 1.93 m (6 ft 4 in)
- Position: Centre back

Senior career*
Years	Team	Apps	(Gls)
1995	St George Saints		
1996–1999	Parramatta Eagles	47	(6)
1999–2001	Wollongong City Wolves	7	(0)
2001–2003	Parramatta Eagles	24	(3)
2002	Tampines Rovers		(2)
2002–2004	Parramatta Power	35	(4)
2004–2005	Marconi Stallions		
2005–2009	Central Coast Mariners	29	(1)
2010	APIA Leichhardt Tigers		
- * Club domestic league appearances and goals as of 29 November 2008

Paul James O'Grady (born 6 November 1978), is an Australian former professional footballer.

== Early life ==
O'Grady grew up in Engadine, in Sydney's south.

== Career ==
O'Grady played for Central Coast Mariners for four seasons, making 42 appearances in all competitions before being released by the club in May 2009. His only goal in the A-League came from a corner kick in a win over Sydney FC on 13 October 2006.

O'Grady signed with APIA Leichhardt Tigers in December 2009.

== Honours ==
=== Club ===
Wollongong Wolves

- Oceania Club Championship: 2001

Central Coast Mariners

- A-League Premiership: 2007–08

== See also ==
- List of Central Coast Mariners FC players
