= Danny Vukovic =

Australian soccer player (born 1985)

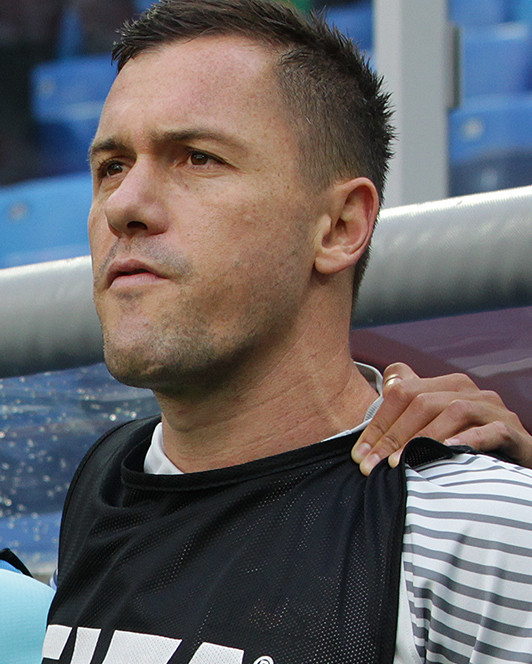
- Vukovic at the 2017 FIFA Confederations Cup

Personal information
- Full name: Daniel Vukovic
- Date of birth: 27 March 1985 (age 41)
- Place of birth: Sydney, New South Wales, Australia
- Height: 1.87 m (6 ft 2 in)
- Position: Goalkeeper

Team information
- Current team: Central Coast Mariners (Goalkeeping Coach)

Youth career
- –1999: St Clair United
- 1999–2002: Bonnyrigg White Eagles

Senior career*
Years	Team	Apps	(Gls)
2002–2004	Parramatta Power	5	(0)
2004–2005	Bonnyrigg White Eagles	14	(0)
2005–2010	Central Coast Mariners	104	(0)
2010	Konyaspor	0	(0)
2010–2011	Wellington Phoenix	17	(1)
2011–2015	Perth Glory	106	(0)
2014	→ Vegalta Sendai (loan)	0	(0)
2015–2016	Melbourne Victory	23	(0)
2016–2017	Sydney FC	28	(0)
2017–2021	Genk	101	(0)
2021–2022	NEC Nijmegen	0	(0)
2022–2024	Central Coast Mariners	59	(0)
Total		457	(1)

International career
2005	Australia U20	4	(0)
2006–2008	Australia U23	18	(0)
2009–2022	Australia	4	(0)
- * Club domestic league appearances and goals

Daniel Vukovic (/ˈvuːkəvɪtʃ/ VOO-kə-vitch; born 27 March 1985) is a former Australian professional soccer player who played as a goalkeeper. He is currently the goalkeeping coach for Central Coast Mariners FC. Vukovic also represented the Australian national team during his career. Vukovic is the holder of several A-League records: he has the most clean sheets of any goalkeeper in A-League history (103), and he is the only goalkeeper to score in the A-League.

== Club career ==
=== Central Coast Mariners ===
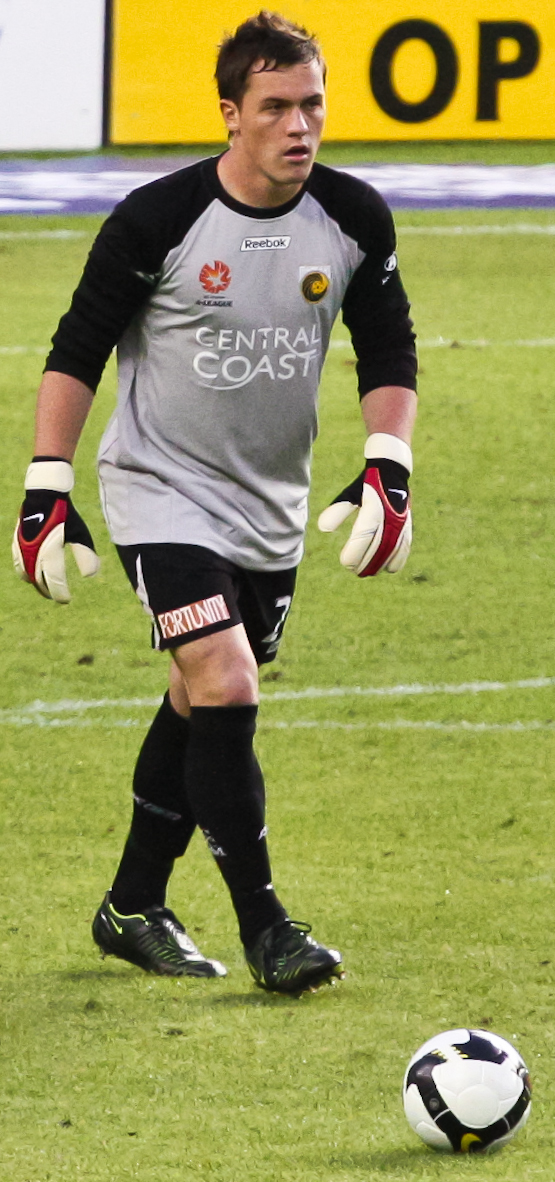
Vukovic playing for Central Coast Mariners in 2008

Vukovic has previously played for Bonnyrigg White Eagles and Parramatta Power.

Vukovic made his A-League debut for the Central Coast Mariners in September 2005 against Melbourne Victory after the team's first-choice keeper John Crawley suffered a season-ending hip injury. They lost the game 2–1, however Vukovic saved an Archie Thompson penalty and was widely praised for his debut effort. He went on to play 19 more games for the Mariners in the 2005–06 season, achieving five clean sheets, and also saved a penalty from Sydney FC's star player, Dwight Yorke.

Like many Mariners players, Vukovic spends time in schools and at local junior football games, encouraging football at a grassroots level. It was known that Vukovic had desires to play overseas, and it was revealed on 29 June he has signed with TFF First League club Konyaspor.

During the third A-League Grand Final on 24 February 2008, Vukovic received a red card for slapping referee Mark Shield's hand following an alleged handball by Newcastle Jets player James Holland. On the day after the Grand Final, Football Federation Australia (FFA) gave Vukovic a 15-month ban (with 6 months suspended), meaning he would not be able to play in the A-League until 24 November 2008.

On 4 March 2008, this ban was reduced on appeal to 12 months (with 3 months suspended), meaning that if Vukovic re-offended in the following year, the 3-month suspended sentence would be activated. The ban extended to national team duty, which precluded him from competing in the 2008 Summer Olympics with the Australian U-23 team, the Olyroos, which he represented in all Olympic qualifiers for Beijing and had captained on occasion.

Vukovic's ban was appealed a second time and on 22 April 2008 Football Federation Australia announced that the appeals committee had settled on a split suspension; up to 24 June 2008 and then from 29 August through to 5 October 2008. Vukovic was also fined $10,000 and will have a further part of his sentence suspended from 6 October 2008 through to 25 January 2009.

Although Vukovic will be ineligible to play for the Mariners in the early rounds of the 2008–09 A-League season, the decision means he will be eligible for selection for the Australian Olympic team competing in Beijing.

But in June, FIFA re-stated that his ban from International Competition did include a ban on competing in the Olympic Games with the Olyroos. He was banned from International football till 6 October, when the ban is suspended till 25 January 2009 subject to no further infringement up to, and including, 25 January 2009.

Vukovic's 9-month ban remains the longest suspension in A-League history.

=== Konyaspor ===
Vukovic signed for the Turkish club on a 2-year deal, but was released on 13 August 2010 after the club found that they had too many overseas players on their books.

=== Wellington Phoenix ===
After being released by Konyaspor, Vukovic signed a one-year deal for the remainder of the 2010–11 season with the Wellington outfit, largely due to an injury suffered by back-up goalkeeper Reece Crowther. He initially backed-up regular custodian Mark Paston with occasional appearances, and eventually became first-choice when Paston suffered a season ending knee injury. On 13 February, he scored the first goal of his career and the first for any keeper in the A-League for the Phoenix with a 93rd-minute penalty in the final round clash against the North Queensland Fury.

=== Perth Glory ===
Vukovic signed a 3-year deal beginning in the 2011–12 season with Perth Glory. Vukovic was the number one goalkeeper at Perth and enjoyed a successful season as the club made it to their first A-League grand final, losing to Brisbane Roar.

=== Vegalta Sendai ===
Vukovic joined Japanese side Vegalta Sendai on a 5-month loan deal. Vukovic but did not make an official appearance for the club, but was on the bench on numerous occasions.

=== Melbourne Victory ===
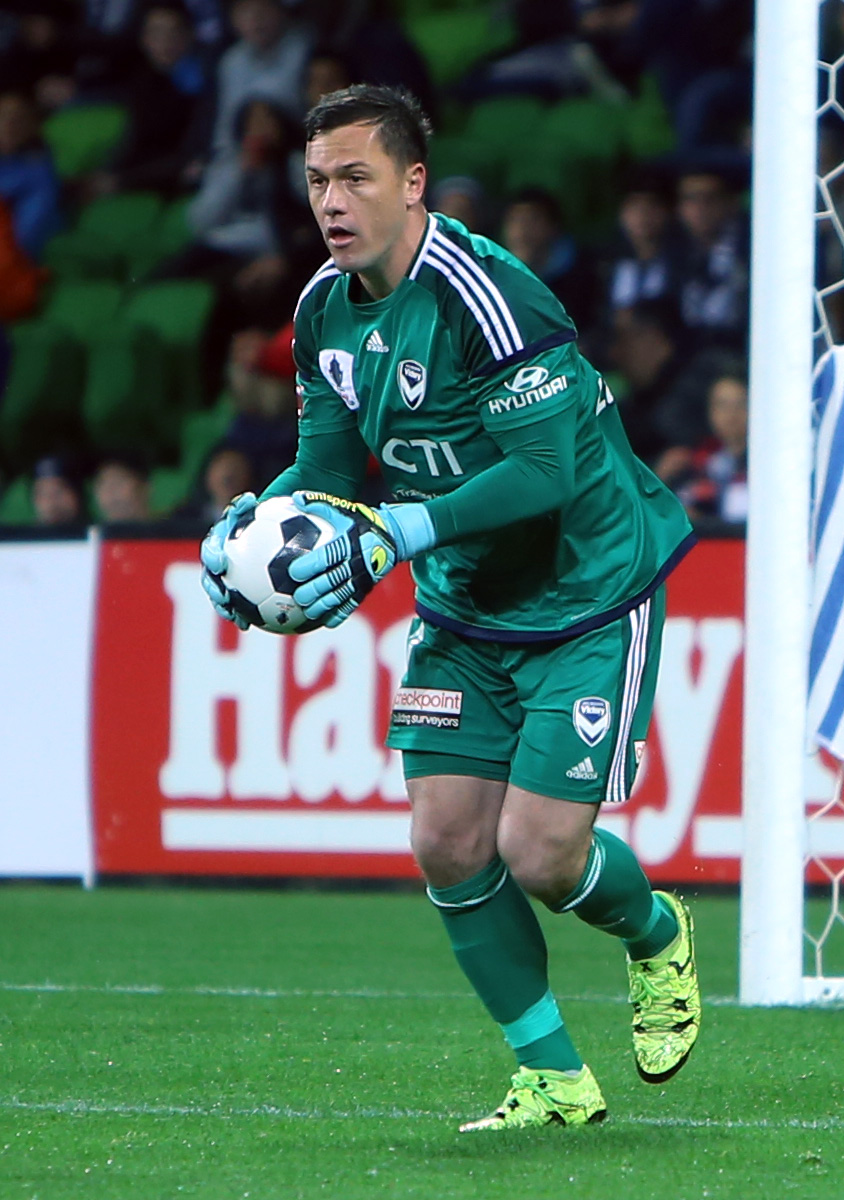
Vukovic playing for Melbourne Victory in the 2015 FFA Cup

On 4 June 2015, it was confirmed that Vukovic had signed a three-year deal with A-League champions & premiers Melbourne Victory, being a major replacement for departing keepers Nathan Coe and Michael Turnbull. Vukovic revealed that a factor of signing the deal with the Melbourne club was that he & his wife Kristy wanted to live on the Eastern coast of Australia so that their new born child (expected in July 2015) would be raised closer to their respective families from Sydney.

Vukovic agreed to end his contract with Victory after one season on compassionate grounds in July 2016.

=== Sydney FC ===
On the day Vukovic parted ways with Melbourne Victory, he signed with Sydney FC on a two-year deal, stating that he made the move to be closer to his family for the sake of his son's health.

=== Genk ===
On 21 June 2017, Vukovic transferred to Genk with Sydney FC receiving a club-record transfer fee of almost $1,000,000. On 4 August 2017, he made his debut in a 2–1 loss to Standard Liège. Vukovic made 45 appearances in all competitions during Genk's 2017–18 season and was the surprise recipient of the fan-voted Golden Shoe award for player of the season. On 20 March 2021, it was announced that a contract termination was agreed, to allow Vukovic to return to Australia to support his heavily pregnant wife.

=== NEC Nijmegen ===
In June 2021, Vukovic joined Eredivisie club NEC Nijmegen on a two-year contract.

=== Return to Central Coast Mariners ===
Vukovic returned to Central Coast Mariners in August 2022. He was named captain of the Mariners in October 2022. Vukovic brought up his 300th A-League appearance in a 4–1 win over Brisbane Roar on 1 April 2023, round 22 of the 2022–23 A-League season.

Vukovic captained the Mariners to the 2023 A-League Championship, with a 6–1 victory over Melbourne City in the Grand Final.

On 8 December 2023, Vukovic broke the all-time record for clean sheets in A-League history, registering his 91st clean sheet in a 4–0 home victory over Western United. Later that season, on 10 March 2024, Vukovic recorded his 100th clean sheet in the A-League in a 3–0 victory away to Macarthur FC.

Vukovic was captain of the Mariners' Championship, Premiership and AFC Cup winning 2023–24 season. Vukovic's final match of his career was the A-League Grand Final against Melbourne Victory, in which the Mariners won 3–1, announcing his retirement the following day at the club's celebration event at Erina Fair. It was also announced that Vukovic would be staying on with the club in a coaching capacity, taking over as goalkeeping coach.

== International career ==
Vukovic played in the Young Socceroos team which won the 2005 OFC U-20 Championship.

He played several matches for the Olyroos, however missed the 2008 Beijing Olympics through suspension.

Vukovic made his debut for the senior team on his 33rd birthday, coming on as a substitute for Brad Jones at half-time against Colombia. He gave away but then saved a penalty in the 86th minute to keep the game to a scoreless draw.

In May 2018 he was named in Australia's 23-man squad for the 2018 FIFA World Cup in Russia. Vukovic was also named in the Australian squad for the 2022 FIFA World Cup in Qatar.

== Personal life ==
Vukovic was born on 27 March 1985 in Sydney to a Serbian family. During an interview with Fox Sports regarding his new deal with Melbourne Victory, Vukovic revealed that he and his wife Kristy were expecting their first child in July 2015, stating that they wanted their child to be raised on the eastern coast of Australia, so they could be closer to their respective families, which contributed to the signing the deal with the Melbourne club. His son was diagnosed with biliary atresia soon after birth, and required a liver transplant. This was a contributing factor towards moving to Sydney FC, where he would be closer to their family as well as medical support.

== Club statistics ==
As of 4 October 2023

Club	Season	League^{1}			Cup		International^{2}		Total	
Club	Season	Division	Apps	Goals	Apps	Goals	Apps	Goals	Apps	Goals
Parramatta Power	2002–03	National Soccer League	5	0	0	0	0	0	5	0
Parramatta Power	2003–04	National Soccer League	0	0	0	0	0	0	0	0
Parramatta Power	Total		5	0	0	0	0	0	5	0
Bonnyrigg White Eagles	2004–05	NSW Premier League	14	0	0	0	0	0	14	0
Central Coast Mariners	2005–06	A-League	20	0	0	0	0	0	20	0
Central Coast Mariners	2006–07	A-League	20	0	6	0	0	0	26	0
Central Coast Mariners	2007–08	A-League	20	0	3	0	0	0	23	0
Central Coast Mariners	2008–09	A-League	18	0	3	0	6	0	27	0
Central Coast Mariners	2009–10	A-League	26	0	0	0	0	0	26	0
Central Coast Mariners	Total		104	0	12	0	6	0	122	0
Konyaspor	2010–11	Süper Lig	0	0	0	0	0	0	0	0
Wellington Phoenix	2010–11	A-League	17	1	0	0	0	0	17	1
Perth Glory	2011–12	A-League	31	0	0	0	0	0	31	0
Perth Glory	2012–13	A-League	28	0	0	0	0	0	28	0
Perth Glory	2013–14	A-League	21	0	0	0	0	0	21	0
Perth Glory	2014–15	A-League	26	0	3	0	0	0	26	0
Perth Glory	Total		106	0	3	0	0	0	109	0
Vegalta Sendai (loan)	2014	J1 League	0	0	2	0	0	0	2	0
Melbourne Victory	2015–16	A-League	23	0	4	0	3	0	30	0
Sydney FC	2016–17	A-League	28	0	5	0	0	0	33	0
Genk	2017–18	Belgian First Division A	39	0	7	0	0	0	46	0
Genk	2018–19	Belgian First Division A	37	0	2	0	12	0	51	0
Genk	2019–20	Belgian First Division A	1	0	1	0	0	0	2	0
Genk	2020–21	Belgian First Division A	24	0	0	0	0	0	24	0
Genk	Total		101	0	10	0	12	0	123	0
NEC Nijmegen	2021–22	Eredivisie	0	0	4	0	0	0	4	0
Central Coast Mariners	2022–23	A-League Men	29	0	0	0	0	0	29	0
Central Coast Mariners	2023–24	A-League Men	30	0	0	0	12 (Note: Appearances in AFC Cup)	0	42	0
Central Coast Mariners	Total		59	0	0	0	12	0	71	0
Career total			457	1	40	0	33	0	530	1

^{1} – includes A-League final series statistics
^{2} – AFC Champions League statistics are included in season commencing during group stages (i.e. ACL 2009 and A-League season 2008–09 etc.)

=== International ===
Statistics accurate as of match played 7 June 2021.

Australia
Year	Apps	Goals
2018	3	0
2019	0	0
2020	0	0
2021	1	0
Total	4	0

== Honours ==
Central Coast Mariners

- A-League Men Premiership: 2007–08, 2023–24
- A-League Men Championship: 2022–23, 2023–24
- AFC Cup: 2023–24
- A-League Pre-Season Challenge Cup: 2005

Melbourne Victory

- FFA Cup: 2015

Sydney FC

- A-League Premiership: 2016–17
- A-League Championship: 2016–17

Genk

- Belgian First Division: 2018–19
- Belgian Super Cup: 2019

Australia

- OFC U-20 Championship: 2005

Individual

- Mariners Medal: 2007, 2010
- PFA A-League Team of the Season: 2009–10, 2013–14, 2014–15, 2016–17, 2023–24
- A-League Goalkeeper of the Year: 2016–17
- K.R.C. Genk Player of the Year: 2017–18
