= Matthew Trott (footballer) =

Australian soccer player

Personal information
- Full name: Matthew Trott
- Date of birth: 9 June 1985 (age 41)
- Place of birth: Gosford, Australia
- Height: 1.85 m (6 ft 1 in)
- Position: Goalkeeper

Team information
- Current team: Maitland FC

Youth career
- East Gosford

Senior career*
Years	Team	Apps	(Gls)
2002–2005	Central Coast United	24	(0)
2005–2008	Central Coast Mariners	6	(0)
2008–2011	Didcot Town		
2016–	Maitland FC	102	(0)
- * Club domestic league appearances and goals as of 2 December 2020

Matthew Trott (born 9 June 1985 in Gosford, New South Wales, Australia) is an Australian professional goalkeeper.

== Career ==
After having 31 consecutive games on the bench listed as a substitute in the A-League, Trott made his A-League debut for the Central Coast Mariners, appearing in the last game of the 2006–07 season. Since then, he has made infrequent appearances for the Mariners as a fill-in for regular goalkeeper Danny Vukovic. After he was released from the Mariners he went to England and signed with non-league club Didcot Town F.C.

== Honours ==
With Central Coast Mariners:

- A-League Premiership: 2007–08

With Didcot Town FC:

- Southern Football League Division One South & West: 2008–09
