= John Crawley (soccer) =

Australian soccer player (born 1972)

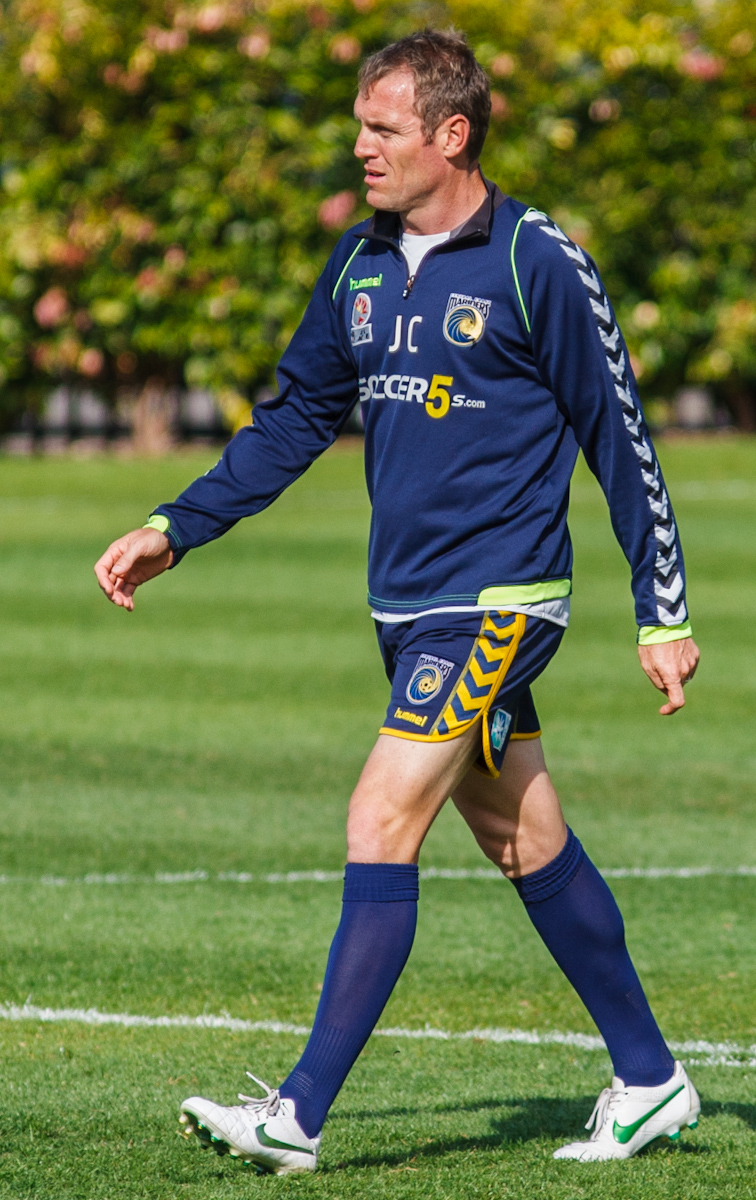
- Crawley coaching Central Coast Mariners in 2012

Personal information
- Full name: John Michael Crawley
- Date of birth: 5 March 1972 (age 54)
- Place of birth: Parramatta, Australia
- Height: 1.86 m (6 ft 1 in)
- Position: Goalkeeper

Team information
- Current team: Australia (Goalkeeping coach)

Youth career
- 1990: Blacktown City

Senior career*
Years	Team	Apps	(Gls)
1990–1995	Colo-Colo	1	(0)
1992	→ Lota Schwager (loan)		
1993	→ Magallanes (loan)		
1994	→ Juventud Puente Alto (loan)	–	(–)
1996	Blacktown City		
1998–1999	Macarthur Rams	48	(0)
1999–2000	Sydney United	4	(0)
2000–2005	Blacktown City		
2005–2007	Central Coast Mariners	5	(0)
2014	Central Coast Mariners	0	(0)
- * Club domestic league appearances and goals

John Michael Crawley (born 5 March 1972) is an Australian former soccer player who played as a goalkeeper. Since retiring as a player, he has worked as a goalkeeping coach.

== Playing career ==
=== South America ===
Crawley first travelled to South America on a NSW Schoolboys tour in 1990. This eventually led to his signing with Chilean club Colo-Colo. Crawley spent the next five years at Colo-Colo, including some loan spells to clubs including Lota Schwager, Magallanes and Juventud Puente Alto. Crawley acted as a liaison officer when the Australian national team stayed in Chile in preparation for the 1994 FIFA World Cup qualification play-off against Argentina in November 1993. He made his first team debut for Colo-Colo in a draw against Atacama in the last game of the 1994 Primera División of Chile. Crawley remained second choice at Colo-Colo, behind Chilean international goalkeeper Marcelo Ramírez, and in 1995 was forced to decide between adopting Chilean citizenship or retaining his Australian passport.

=== Return to New South Wales ===
Crawley returned to Australia in 1995. He spent the next decade moving between several clubs, largely in the New South Wales state league, with the exception of a brief spell in the National Soccer League with Sydney United.

Crawley was signed by Central Coast Mariners in December 2004 ahead of the inaugural A-League season. By the start of the season, Crawley had shown good form and established himself as the Mariners first-choice 'keeper. However, a hip injury in the early rounds of the season saw Crawley miss most of the season, his place in the side taken by young goalkeeper Danny Vukovic, who Crawley had coached for several years.

== Coaching career ==
Before his retirement as a player, Crawley had taken up a role as goalkeeping coach at the Mariners, and continued in that role for over a decade, also taking on other coaching duties including video analysis. His role in the development of Mariners goalkeepers Danny Vukovic and Mathew Ryan from young ages to becoming established professionals was particularly notable.

Crawley took up a position with the Australia under-23s in 2015, in the lead-up to the 2016 AFC U-23 Championship.

In 2015, Crawley joined Sydney FC as their goalkeeping coach, following former Mariners head coach Graham Arnold.

Over his years of coaching, he takes heavy influence off the goalkeeping styles of South America, many of which he picked up himself during his time at Colo-Colo. He states that he is often preached for his coaching in one-on-one situations and most notably the side volley, which helped develop his former Mariners goalkeepers.

== Honours ==
Central Coast Mariners

- A-League Pre-Season Challenge Cup: 2005

== See also ==
- List of Central Coast Mariners FC players
