= Jamie McMaster =

Australian former footballer (born 1982)

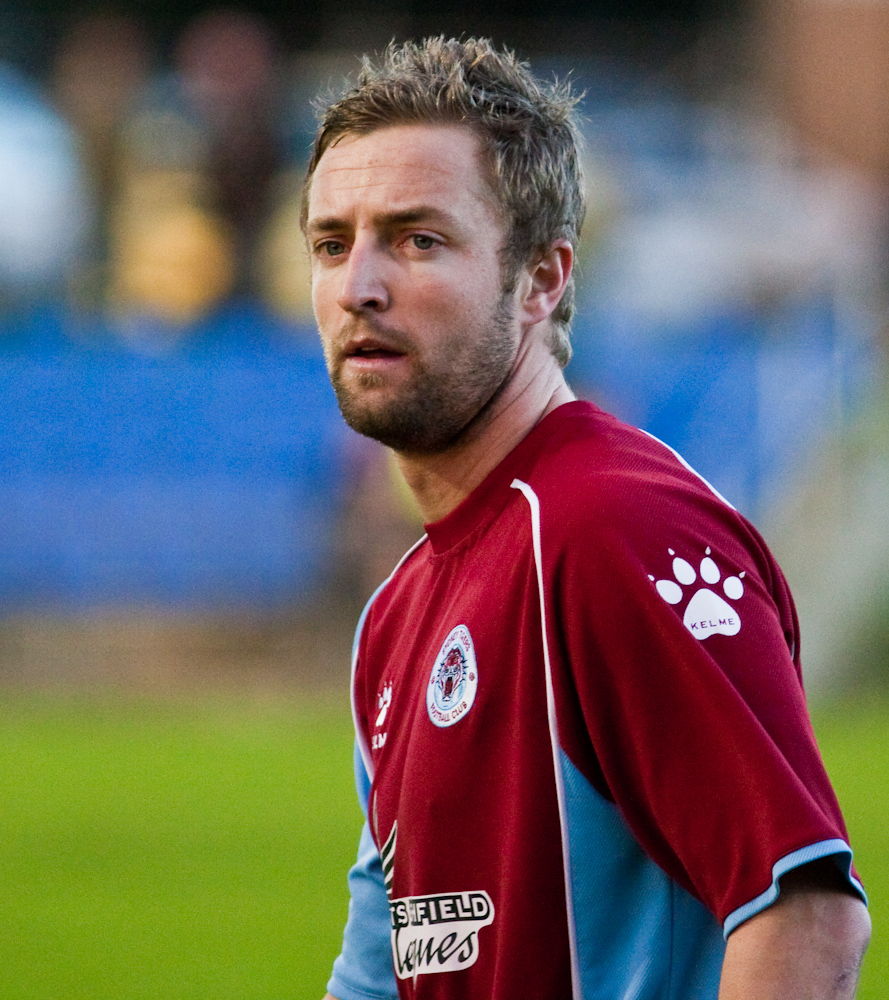
- McMaster playing for APIA Leichhardt Tigers in 2009

Personal information
- Date of birth: 29 November 1982 (age 43)
- Place of birth: Sydney, Australia
- Position: Attacking midfielder

Senior career*
Years	Team	Apps	(Gls)
1999–2005	Leeds United	11	(0)
2002	→ Coventry City (loan)	2	(0)
2004	→ Chesterfield (loan)	6	(2)
2004	→ Swindon Town (loan)	4	(1)
2005	→ Peterborough United (loan)	3	(0)
2005	Chesterfield	8	(0)
2006	AGF Aarhus	5	(0)
2006–2007	Central Coast Mariners	25	(1)
2008–2009	APIA Leichhardt Tigers	21	(8)
2009	Wollongong CFC	4	(1)
2010–2011	Bonnyrigg White Eagles	42	(8)
2012	Marconi Stallions	21	(2)
2013–2015	Sutherland Sharks	36	(4)

International career
1999	England U16	1	(0)
2000	England U18	5	(0)
2002	England U20	2	(0)
- * Club domestic league appearances and goals

Jamie McMaster (born 29 November 1982) is an Australian former footballer who last played as an attacking midfielder.

Despite being born in Sydney, Australia, McMaster represented England at U16, U18 and U20 levels before successfully requesting to be eligible for the Australian national team.

== Early life ==
McMaster grew up in Gosford, a region on the Central Coast, and played football for Umina United.

== Club career ==
He began his professional career at Premier League club Leeds United in 1999 as a 16-year-old where he joined Harry Kewell and Mark Viduka in the fleet of Australians in the squad but committed his international future to England.

While at Leeds McMaster had loan spells at lower-league clubs within England. On 19 November 2002, McMaster joined Coventry City on a month-long loan, and returned to Leeds a month later, having made 2 appearances for Coventry and damaging his deltoid ligament. On 7 January 2004, he joined Chesterfield on a one-month loan. The loan was later extended for a further month. At Chesterfield he scored twice, with goals against QPR and Peterborough United.

McMaster joined Swindon Town on loan in September 2004. He scored once during this loan, against Stockport County, before returning to Leeds in October. He also had a loan at Peterborough United. In December 2004, McMaster was fined for a breach of discipline at the club Christmas party. On 4 March 2005, McMaster returned to Chesterfield on loan until the end of the season, though this loan was made permanent a week later.

After a spell with AGF Aarhus, McMaster joined A-League club Central Coast Mariners on a short-term deal on 29 December 2005, and signed a longer term deal in May 2006. He left the Mariners in April 2007 at the expiry of his contract. After a period out of the game he moved to NSW Premier League side APIA Leichhardt Tigers in 2008, and after a short spell with Wollongong CFC in 2009, he joined Bonnyrigg White Eagles for the 2010 season.

== International career ==
He has been capped for England at under-16, under-18 and under-20 level.

In 2005, FIFA approved a request made by McMaster to be eligible for selection in the Australia national soccer team.
