= Stewart Petrie =

Scottish footballer (born 1970)

Personal information
- Date of birth: 27 February 1970 (age 56)
- Place of birth: Dundee, Scotland
- Position: Left winger

Team information
- Current team: Montrose (Manager)

Senior career*
Years	Team	Apps	(Gls)
1989–1993	Forfar Athletic	117	(34)
1993–2003	Dunfermline Athletic	256	(46)
2003–2004	Northern Spirit	37	(10)
2004	Geylang United	3	(1)
2004–2005	Blacktown City Demons	?	(?)
2005–2007	Central Coast Mariners	41	(10)
2007	Wollongong Wolves	?	(?)
2007–2008	Ross County	13	(6)

Managerial career
- 2015: Forfar Athletic (interim)
- 2016–: Montrose
- * Club domestic league appearances and goals

Stewart Petrie (born 27 February 1970) is a Scottish football player and coach, who is manager of Scottish League One side Montrose since 2016, making him currently the longest serving manager in the Scottish Professional Leagues.

A Left winger, he spent most of his playing career with Forfar Athletic and Dunfermline Athletic, later moving to Australia. Petrie returned to Scotland in 2007, playing for Ross County. He has since worked as a coach for several clubs, including Arbroath, Forfar Athletic, as well as then SJFA East Superleague side Broughty Athletic.

== Playing career ==
Petrie was born in Dundee, and began his career with Scottish side Forfar Athletic, before moving to Dunfermline in 1993. Spending much of his Dunfermline career in left midfield, he managed a goal ratio of one every six games during his ten years there. He is best remembered for scoring a crucial goal in the penultimate game of the 1995–96 season which effectively won Dunfermline the league championship and with it promotion back to the Scottish Premier League.

In January 2003, Petrie was awarded a testimonial match and appeared for both sides as Dunfermline played against a side of former Dunfermline players. Petrie scored a late penalty to end his Dunfermline career before moving to Australia.

Petrie joined Northern Spirit and managed 10 goals in 37 appearances there. He then spent a short spell in Singapore with Geylang United, in which he scored once during his three matches there.

Petrie then came back to Australia with Blacktown City Demons, appearing alongside fellow Mariners Ian Ferguson and John Crawley.

He signed for the Central Coast Mariners for the inaugural A-League season, coming in for a coaching role, but an injury crisis meant Petrie would become a registered player. He ended up sharing the Golden Boot with Alex Brosque, Bobby Despotovski and Archie Thompson, scoring eight goals in the 2005–06 season.

In 2007, he joined Scottish Second Division side Ross County in a player/coach role and helped them get promoted to Scottish First Division before retiring at the end of the 2007–08 season. He stayed with Ross County in a youth coaching role.

== Managerial career ==
On 12 February 2009, Petrie was appointed assistant coach of new A-League franchise North Queensland Fury.

After Dick Campbell was sacked by Forfar Athletic, Petrie took over as caretaker manager in December 2015 overseeing a one all draw with Albion Rovers before making way for incoming manager Gary Bollan.

On 6 July 2016, Petrie became the assistant manager of SJFA East Superleague club Broughty Athletic, where he stayed for five months before being appointed manager of Scottish League Two side Montrose on 4 December 2016. He led the Angus side to the Scottish League Two title and promotion to the third tier in April 2018.

== Managerial statistics ==
As of match played 14 November 2026

Team	From	To	Record					
Team	From	To	G	W	D	L	Win %	
Forfar Athletic (interim)	12 December 2015	21 December 2015	1	0	1	0	0.00	
Montrose	4 December 2016	Present	433	181	95	157	41.80	
Total			434	181	96	157	41.7	—

== Honours ==
Montrose

- Scottish League Two: 2017–18

Preceded by Ante Milicic	Hyundai A-League Golden Boot; 2005–06	Succeeded by Danny Allsopp
