= List of Central Coast Mariners FC head coaches =

Central Coast Mariners Football Club, founded in 2004, is based in Gosford, on the Central Coast of New South Wales. It has had eleven managers in its history (including two caretakers), the first being Lawrie McKinna and the current being Mark Jackson.

All figures are correct as of 25 May 2024.

== Statistics ==
Table headers

- Nationality – If the manager played international football as a player, the country/countries he played for are shown. Otherwise, the manager's nationality is given as their country of birth.
- From – The year of the manager's first game for Central Coast Mariners.
- To – The year of the manager's last game for Central Coast Mariners.
- P – The number of competitive games managed for Central Coast Mariners.
- W – The number of games won as a manager.
- D – The number of games drawn as a manager.
- L – The number of games lost as a manager.
- GF – The number of goals scored under his management.
- GA – The number of goals conceded under his management.
- GD – The goal difference under his management
- Win% – The total winning percentage under his management.
- Honours – The trophies won while managing Central Coast Mariners.

Note: Games included are A-League Men (including finals and Pre-Season Cup), Australia Cup, AFC Champions League, AFC Cup and Oceania Club Championship Qualification. Friendlies are not included.

Image	Name	Nationality	From	To	P	W	D	L	GF	GA	GD	Win%	Honours	Source
	Lawrie McKinna	Scotland	7 May 2005	12 February 2010	148	54	40	54	200	141	+59	36.49	Team 2005 A-League Pre-Season Challenge Cup 2007–08 A-League Premiership Personal 2005–06 A-League Coach of the Year	
	Graham Arnold	Australia	5 August 2010	10 November 2013	112	54	29	29	168	87	+81	48.21	Team 2011–12 A-League Premiership 2012–13 A-League Championship Personal 2011–12 A-League Coach of the Year	
	Phil Moss	Australia	23 November 2013	28 February 2015	54	20	10	24	61	71	-10	37.04		
	Tony Walmsley	England	8 March 2015	2 August 2016	37	5	5	27	43	82	-39	13.51		
	Paul Okon	Australia	8 October 2016	18 March 2018	51	10	13	28	58	75	-17	19.61		
	Wayne O'Sullivan (caretaker)	Ireland	24 March 2018	14 April 2018	4	0	0	4	3	12	-9	0.00		
	Mike Mulvey	England	1 August 2018	9 March 2019	22	1	4	17	24	55	-31	4.55		
	Alen Stajcic	Australia	16 March 2019	12 June 2021	63	22	9	32	74	96	-22	34.92		
	Nick Montgomery	Scotland	13 November 2021	11 September 2023	63	32	11	20	132	67	+65	50.79	Team 2022–23 A-League Championship	
	Abbas Saad (caretaker)	Australia	20 September 2023	20 September 2023	1	0	0	1	0	1	-1	0.00		
	Mark Jackson	England	4 October 2023	10 October 2025	77	33	20	24	130	91	+39	42.86	Team 2023–24 A–League Premiership 2023–24 A-League Championship 2023–24 AFC Cup Personal 2023–24 A-League Coach of the Year	
	Warren Moon	Australia	15 October 2025	25 April 2026	26	8	8	10	35	42	–7	30.77		
	John Hutchinson	Malta	29 June 2026	Present	1	0	1	0	1	1	0	0.00		
