= Canberra Stadium =

Stadium in Canberra, Australia

- Canberra Stadium in October 2026
- Interactive map of Canberra Stadium
- Former names: Bruce Stadium; National Athletics Stadium
- Location: Bruce, Australian Capital Territory, Australia
- Coordinates: 35°15′0″S 149°6′10″E
- Owner: Australian Sports Commission
- Capacity: 25,011
- Surface: Grass
- Record attendance: 28,753 (Super 12 Grand Final: Brumbies vs. Crusaders)
- Public transit: Buses

Construction
- Opened: 29 October 1977; 49 years ago
- Architect: Philip Cox
- Main contractor: Leighton Contractors

Tenants
- Canberra Raiders (NSWRL/ARL/Super League/NRL) (1990–present); ACT Brumbies (Super Rugby) (1996–present); Canberra City FC (NSL) (1977–1986); Canberra Cosmos FC (NSL) (1995–2001); 2015 AFC Asian Cup; Canberra Bushrangers (ABL) (1993–1995); Fitzroy Football Club (AFL) (1995); 1990 International Rules Series; 2000 Summer Olympics (Football); 2008 Rugby League World Cup; 2017 Rugby League World Cup; 2003 Rugby World Cup

Website
- www.giostadiumcanberra.com.au

Canberra Stadium (known under naming rights as GIO Stadium Canberra) is a stadium located in the Canberra suburb of Bruce, adjacent to the Australian Institute of Sport (AIS). It is primarily used for rugby league and rugby union as the home ground of the Canberra Raiders in the National Rugby League (NRL), and the ACT Brumbies in Super Rugby.

The stadium opened in 1977, and remains the largest stadium in Canberra with a total capacity of 25,011 spectators. Australian general insurer GIO Insurance has held naming rights to the stadium since 2014.

The stadium hosted preliminaries of Football in the 2000 Summer Olympics. It has also hosted group stage games in the 2003 Rugby World Cup, the 2008 Rugby League World Cup, and the 2017 Rugby League World Cup. It has also hosted three Super Rugby Grand Finals in 2000, 2001, and 2004, as well as the 2020 grand final in Super Rugby AU.

== History ==
The facility was designed by architect Philip Cox and constructed by Leighton Contractors. It opened on 29 October 1977.

In 1977, it was the venue for the Pacific Conference Games, and was also the venue for the 4th IAAF World Cup in Athletics. At the latter meet, the still-current world record for the women's 400m was recorded by East German Marita Koch, and a world record for the women's 4 × 100 m relay was set by East Germany, which stood until the 2012 London Olympic Games.

In the late 1980s, the running track was removed and the warm-up track next door upgraded. New offices, seating, and photo-finish facilities were added. In the 1990 NSWRL season, the reigning NSWRL premiers the Canberra Raiders moved to Bruce Stadium from Seiffert Oval in Queanbeyan, their home ground since entering the New South Wales Rugby League in 1982. The Raiders won their second straight premiership in 1990.

The removal of the athletics track meant that Australian rules football games, more specifically those of the Australian Football League (AFL), could be played at the ground, resulting in pre-season matches being scheduled as early as 1990. In 1995, an AFL match for premiership points was contested between the West Coast Eagles and Fitzroy. There were also a number of pre-season AFL games played at the venue, mostly featuring the Sydney Swans.

Also around that time, a cricket pitch was placed in the centre of the ground as an experiment, and a day/night one-day cricket match was played between two local teams before a small crowd. Regular cricket matches on the ground did not eventuate.

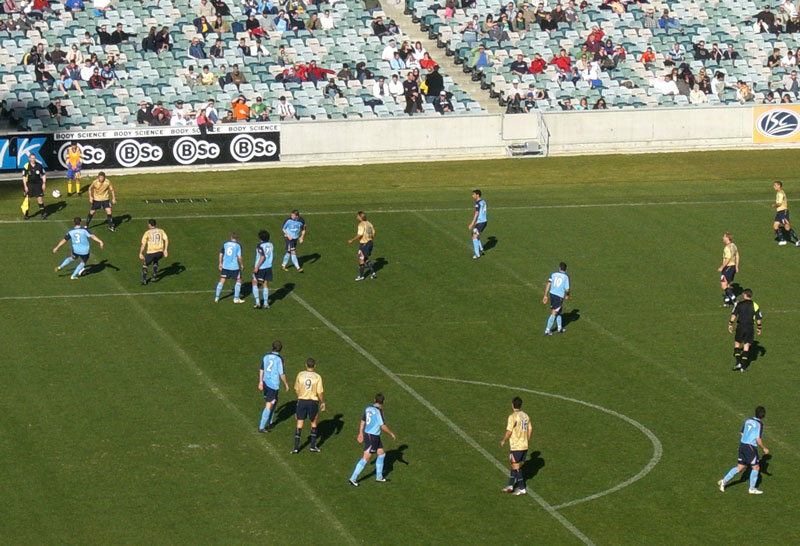
Sydney FC playing Newcastle at Canberra Stadium in 2006

Further renovations occurred in 1997, in preparation for staging soccer matches as part of the 2000 Summer Olympics in Sydney, which shrank the size of the playing field, preventing any future Australian rules football games being played there. The final cost of the renovations was more than seven times what had been originally anticipated by the Territory government of the time, and the subsequent controversy ended the career of then Chief Minister Kate Carnell. During the lead-up, unseasonal snow fell on 28 May 2000, during a match between the Raiders and the Wests Tigers, the only such occasion in National Rugby League history, with the snow causing frost damage to the turf intended for the Olympic soccer tournament.

Olympic soccer in 2000 initiated a stadium facelift, converting the playing surface from oval to rectangular and bringing the crowd closer to the action. It is now an all-seater rectangular stadium with two main grandstands on either side of the playing field. The major outcome of that revamp was that the stadium could no longer host AFL games. All top-class cricket and Australian rules football games in Canberra are now staged at the 15,000-capacity Manuka Oval.

A 2008 Rugby League World Cup game between Scotland and France was played at Canberra Stadium, the first ever rugby league test played at the venue. France defeated Scotland 36–16.

In 2009, there was an A-League bid from Canberra that, if successful would have seen an A-League soccer team play at the stadium starting with the 2010–11 season. However, the League decided that the new teams would be Sydney Rovers FC (which dissolved due to financial problems) and Melbourne Heart FC.

To coincide with Canberra's 100th birthday celebrations, the stadium was chosen to host the 2013 Rugby League Anzac Test between Australia and New Zealand. On 19 April 2013 in what was the first game ever played by the Kangaroos in Australia's capital city, a crowd of 25,628 saw Australia defeat their Trans-Tasman rivals 32–12.

In January 2014, Canberra Stadium was rebranded GIO Stadium Canberra as part of a naming rights deal with GIO Insurance.

A new video screen was installed at the southern end of the stadium in March 2020.

In June 2026, it was announced that the stadium would be getting A$15m in upgrades over three years which will include new LED lighting, security upgrades, and new-look concourses.

== Ownership ==
The stadium is currently owned by the Australian Government through the Australian Sports Commission and leased to the Government of the Australian Capital Territory. While the current lease is due to expire in 2010, the ACT Government is seeking ownership of the stadium through a land transfer with the Australian Government.

== Seating and capacity ==
Capacity is a nominal all-seated 25,011, the largest crowd being 28,753 for the 2004 Super 12 Final. The main grandstand is named after Canberra Raiders and Australian rugby league player Mal Meninga, and a statue of another Raiders and Australian league representative Laurie Daley adorns the main grandstand entrance.

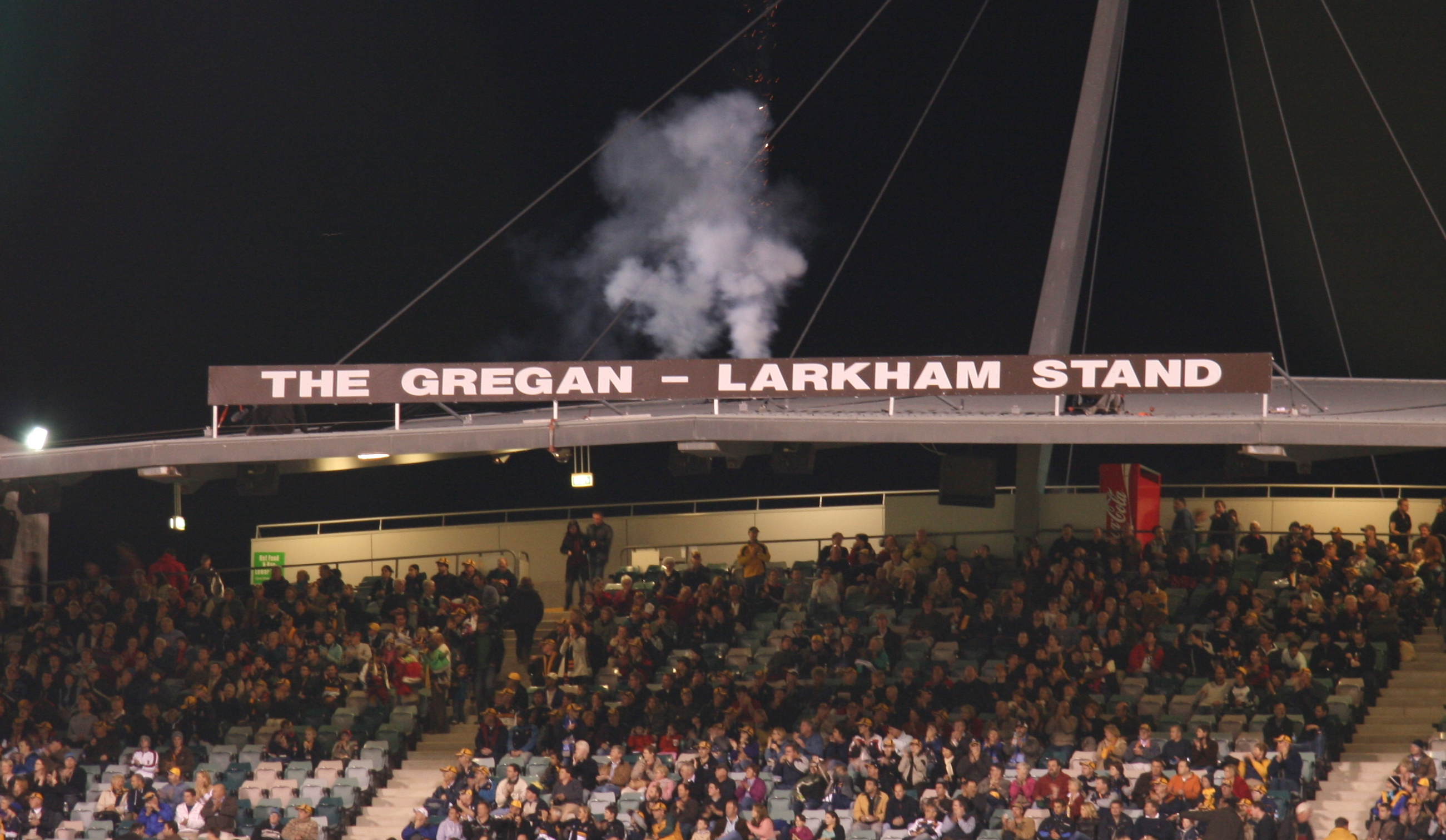
Unveiling of the Gregan-Larkham stand at Canberra Stadium on 28 April 2007.

The eastern grandstand was named the Gregan/Larkham Grandstand on 28 April 2007, after Brumbies and Australia rugby union greats George Gregan and Stephen Larkham. Both ended their international careers after the 2007 Rugby World Cup as the two most-capped players in Wallabies history (at that time), with Gregan at a world-record 139 and Larkham at 102.

=== Crowd records ===
Attendance	Date	Event
28,754	22 May 2004	2004 Super 12 Final – Brumbies vs Canterbury Crusaders
27,489	27 May 2000	2000 Super 12 Final – Brumbies vs Canterbury Crusaders
26,567	27 September 2019	2019 NRL Preliminary Final – Canberra Raiders vs South Sydney Rabbitohs
26,476	17 September 2010	2010 NRL Semi Final – Canberra Raiders vs Wests Tigers
25,628	19 April 2013	2013 Anzac Test – Kangaroos vs Kiwis
25,125	2 June 2025	Biggest women's sporting event in Canberra – Australia vs Argentina

== Possible replacement ==
Whilst the stadium suits the needs of its two current primary tenants, as of 2017 it is the smallest Super Rugby stadium and only a medium-sized NRL venue. The stadium itself is approaching 35 years old, and despite modernisations over the years is lacking in certain amenities for fans – especially covered seating.

Additionally, Australia had bid for the 2022 FIFA World Cup and Canberra Stadium does not meet the necessary criteria to host matches. As such, the ACT Government launched a study examining the upgrade or replacement of Canberra Stadium, with options ranging from increasing capacity and enclosing the current facility, to completely re-configuring the current stadium to an oval for cricket and Australian rules football and building a state of the art rectangular facility next door.

Citing costs of building multiple facilities as an issue, ACT Sports Minister Andrew Barr indicated his preference would be a 'super stadium' built with World Cup standard facilities and capacity, able to be reduced to approximately 30,000 seats after the event. Such a facility would have to incorporate movable seating in order to accommodate all of the major Australian sporting codes.

The official bid for the 2022 World Cup indicated that the 'super stadium' plan was unlikely and the original plan of a new rectangular stadium built next door to the current stadium, with the existing facility re-configured for oval field sports, was considered to be the likely outcome.

After the failed World Cup bid a new rectangular covered stadium was proposed for Canberra. In 2013 the ACT government announced plans to build a 30,000 covered (with a roof similar to Forsyth Barr Stadium) rectangular stadium in the city on the shores of Lake Burley Griffin. It would be part of a 15-year significant redevelopment of the foreshore which extends the city to the Eastern Basin. Along with the stadium, as part of the redevelopment there would be apartments, a convention centre and an urban beach. Plans to build a new stadium have, however, been put on hold indefinitely due to the need for funds to compensate local residents over an asbestos home insulation debacle. Plans to construct the new stadium have since been pushed back by a decade.

== Other notable events ==
- The previous logo of Canberra Stadium, prior to the naming rights deal with GIO Insurance.
  City vs Country rugby league match, 1981. City defeated Country 38–7 in front of 17,490 fans.
- In 1990, the stadium hosted an International Rules match (a combination of Gaelic football and Australian rules football) between Ireland and Australia. Ireland defeated Australia 52–31 in front of 7,000 fans.
- In 1992 the touring Great Britain Lions defeated the Canberra Raiders 24–12 in front of 4,728 fans.
- In 1995, the AFL's ailing Fitzroy Football Club played one home game against the West Coast Eagles at the venue. West Coast defeated Fitzroy 12.10 (82) to 8.6 (54) in front of 11,282 on 27 May.
- The 2nd leg of the 1996 OFC Nations Cup Final
- Super 12 Rugby union Final 2000, 2001, 2004
- Super Rugby AU Rugby union Final 2020
- Four group matches from the 2003 Rugby World Cup.
- The 2008 Pacific Schools Games
- One Group Match from the 2008 Rugby League World Cup.
- On 19 April 2013 the Stadium hosted the 2013 Anzac Test, the first time the Kangaroos had played a test in Canberra. Canberra Stadium was awarded the test as part of Canberra's centenary celebrations.
- Kanga Cup International youth soccer tournament.
- On 5 May 2017 the Stadium hosted the 2017 Anzac Test. This was the last Anzac Test to be played.
- Hosted three Group Matches from the 2017 Rugby League World Cup including the first Australia vs France test in Australia since 1994.
- On July 9 2025 the stadium hosted a British and Irish Lions tour match against the ACT Brumbies. The Lions winning 36–24 in front of 23,116 fans.

=== Concerts & International Matches ===
Rugby Union Test Matches
Date	Team #1	Result	Team #2	Event	Attendance	Referee
22 September 1998	Australia	74–0	Tonga	1999 Rugby World Cup qualifying	14,176	Steve Walsh
22 September 1998	Fiji	26–18	Samoa	1999 Rugby World Cup qualifying	14,176	Steve Lander
24 June 2000	Australia	32–25	Argentina	2000 Puma Trophy	15,072	David McHugh
15 October 2003	Italy	36–12	Tonga	2003 Rugby World Cup Pool D	18,967	Steve Walsh
19 October 2003	Wales	27–20	Tonga	2003 Rugby World Cup Pool D	19,806	Paul Honiss
21 October 2003	Italy	19–14	Canada	2003 Rugby World Cup Pool D	20,515	Paddy O'Brien
25 October 2003	Italy	15–27	Wales	2003 Rugby World Cup Pool D	22,641	Andrew Cole
13 June 2009	Australia	31–8	Italy	2009 mid-year rugby test series	22,468	Romain Poite
5 June 2010	Australia	49–3	Fiji	2010 mid-year rugby test series	15,438	Peter Fitzgibbon
16 September 2017	Australia	45–20	Argentina	2017 Rugby Championship / Puma Trophy	14,229	John Lacey

Soccer
Date	Team #1	Res.	Team #2	Event	Attendance
27 January 1980	Australia	0–4	Czechoslovakia	Friendly	15,283
26 February 1988	Australia	3–0	Chinese Taipei	1988 Olympic Games qualification	
1 November 1996	Australia	5–0	Tahiti	1996 OFC Nations Cup Final	9,421
13 September 2000	Australia	0–3	Germany	2000 Olympic Games (W) Group E	24,800
13 September 2000	United States	2–2	Czech Republic	2000 Olympic Games (M) Group C	24,800
14 September 2000	China	3–1	Nigeria	2000 Olympic Games (W) Group F	16,000
14 September 2000	South Africa	1–2	Japan	2000 Olympic Games (M) Group D	17,500
16 September 2000	Germany	2–1	Brazil	2000 Olympic Games (W) Group C	22,379
16 September 2000	United States	1–1	Cameroon	2000 Olympic Games (M) Group C	22,379
17 September 2000	Norway	3–1	Nigeria	2000 Olympic Games (W) Group F	9,150
17 September 2000	Slovakia	1–2	Japan	2000 Olympic Games (M) Group D	15,289
20 September 2000	Norway	2–1	China	2000 Olympic Games (W) Group F	11,532
20 September 2000	Slovakia	2–1	South Africa	2000 Olympic Games (M) Group D	14,562
24 September 2000	United States	1–0	Brazil	2000 Olympic Games (W) Semi-final	11,000
5 March 2009	Australia	0–1	Kuwait	2011 AFC Asian Cup qualification	20,032
7 October 2011	Australia	5–0	Malaysia	Friendly	10,041
10 January 2015	South Korea	1–0	Oman	2015 AFC Asian Cup - Group A	12,552
11 January 2015	United Arab Emirates	4–1	Qatar	2015 AFC Asian Cup - Group C	5,513
13 January 2015	Kuwait	0–1	South Korea	2015 AFC Asian Cup - Group A	8,795
15 January 2015	Bahrain	1–2	United Arab Emirates	2015 AFC Asian Cup - Group C	7,925
18 January 2015	China	2–1	North Korea	2015 AFC Asian Cup - Group B	18,457
20 January 2015	Iraq	2–0	Palestine	2015 AFC Asian Cup - Group D	10,235
23 January 2015	Iran	3–3 (a.e.t) (Pen: 6–7)	Iraq	2015 AFC Asian Cup - Quarter-finals	18,921
12 November 2015	Australia	3–0	Kyrgyzstan	2018 FIFA World Cup qualification	19,412
10 October 2019	Australia	5–0	Nepal	2022 FIFA World Cup qualification	18,563
26 March 2024	Lebanon (Note: Lebanon will play this home match in Australia, following AFC approval, due to the ongoing Gaza war.)	0–5	Australia	2026 FIFA World Cup qualification	25,023

Rugby league Test Matches
Test#	Date	Result	Attendance	Notes
1	26 October 2008	France def. Scotland 36–18	9,287	2008 Rugby League World Cup Group B
2	19 April 2013	Australia def. New Zealand 32–12	25,628	2013 Anzac Test; First time the Kangaroos had ever played in Australia's capital city
3	5 May 2017	Australia def. New Zealand 30–12	18,535	2017 Anzac Test
4	29 October 2017	Lebanon def. France 29-18	5,492	2017 Rugby League World Cup Group A
5	3 November 2017	Australia def. France 52–6	12,293	2017 Rugby League World Cup Group A
6	10 November 2017	Fiji def. Italy 38–10	6,733	2017 Rugby League World Cup Group D

Concerts
Date	Artist	Tour
14 November 2012	Elton John	40th Anniversary of the Rocket Man
10 December 2016	Keith Urban and Carrie Underwood	Ripcord World Tour
27 January 2019	Keith Urban and Julia Michaels	Graffiti U World Tour
23 February 2024	Matchbox Twenty	Slow Dream Tour
