= List of A-League Men clubs =

The following is a list of clubs who have played in the A-League Men since its formation in 2005 as the A-League to the current season.

Twelve of the fifteen clubs to have participated in the A-League Men are competing in the 2022-23 season. Seven (Adelaide United, Brisbane Roar, Central Coast Mariners, Melbourne Victory, Newcastle Jets, Perth Glory and Sydney FC) have contested every season in the A-League Men.

Five clubs, Macarthur FC, Melbourne City, Wellington Phoenix, Western Sydney Wanderers are not founding members of the A-League Men, but have not been disbanded since their debuts.

== Table ==
All statistics here refer to time in the A-League Men only. A-League Men teams playing in the 2025–26 season are indicated in bold, while founding members of the A-League Men are shown in italics.

Club	Location	Total seasons	Seasons	Highest finish	Most recent finish
**Adelaide United**	Adelaide	21	2005–present	1st	6th
**Auckland FC**	Auckland	2	2024–present	1st	1st
**Brisbane Roar**	Brisbane	21	2005–present	1st	12th
**Central Coast Mariners**	Gosford	21	2005–present	1st	10th
Gold Coast United	Gold Coast	3	2009–2012	3rd	10th
**Macarthur FC**	Sydney (Gregory Hills)	6	2020–present	6th	8th
**Melbourne City**	Melbourne (Cranbourne)	16	2010–present	1st	2nd
**Melbourne Victory**	Melbourne (Swan Street)	21	2005–present	1st	5th
**Newcastle Jets**	Newcastle	21	2005–present	2nd	9th
New Zealand Knights	Auckland	2	2005–2007	8th	8th
North Queensland Fury	Townsville	2	2009–2011	7th	11th
**Perth Glory**	Perth	21	2005–present	1st	13th
**Sydney FC**	Sydney (Surry Hills)	21	2005–present	1st	7th
**Wellington Phoenix**	Wellington	19	2007–present	3rd	11th
**Western Sydney Wanderers**	Sydney (Rooty Hill)	13	2012–present	1st	4th
Western United	Tarneit	5	2019–2025	3rd	3rd

As of the 2007–08 season, New Zealand Knights were disbanded from the A-League, as they were replaced by the Wellington Phoenix.

In 2009, the A-League marked the addition of two new teams both from Queensland which was the Gold Coast United and North Queensland Fury who made their debuts for the 2009–10 season.

In late 2009 Sydney Rovers FC were awarded the license rights to join the A-League provisionally for the 2011–12 season, which would have made them the 11th team in the league, with a 12th team license to be awarded at a later date to even the numbers of participants. One year later the Rovers license was withdrawn due to financial concerns.

The North Queensland Fury only lasted two seasons in the A-League and Gold Coast United lasted three. In Gold Coast's third and final season, new Melbourne club, Melbourne Heart joined the league which brought the total number of teams to 11. In 2012 Gold Coast United were disbanded after low crowds from the A-League and Clive Palmer withdrawing his funding from the team after clashing with the FFA.

New Sydney team Western Sydney Wanderers joined the league in 2012–13 season.

The number of teams in the A-League stayed the same for six years until it was announced that Western United will play in the A-League in 2019 with Macarthur FC joining in 2020.

Auckland will once again host an A-League team from 2024–25 onwards, with Bill Foley being awarded a licence to own the club in November 2023. The Australian Professional Leagues also plans to introduce a Canberra team in the same season. In June 2024, the APL announced that the Canberra team would not be ready for the 2024–25 season.

On 13 February 2025, it was reported that the APL had delayed the introduction of Canberra to the 2025–26 season.

On 8 August 2025, the Western United club's license to compete in the A-League Men and A-League Women competitions was stripped by Football Australia's independent first instance board, which oversees club licensing. The club appealed the decision for the board to consider, but was wound-up by the Federal Court of Australia on 28 August 2025, however the club have been granted a stay. On 2 September, Football Australia's Appeals and Entry Control Body adjourned its decision on the withdrawal of Western United's licence until 9 September. On 6 September 2025, the Western United club's A-Leagues participation was paused for the 2025–26 season, with the possibility of returning at a later date.

== Chart ==
=== Timeline ===
League member Former member
