= Canberra A-League expansion bids =

Attempts to bring professional football to Canberra

- Proposed name: Canberra United FC
- Status: Ongoing

Location
- Region: Canberra
- Proposed stadium: Canberra Stadium, Canberra

Sport information
- Sport: Soccer
- League: A-League Men; A-League Women

History
- First proposed: 2005

Following is a list of all Canberra-based bids to secure a franchise licence from Football Australia (FA), formally Football Federation Australia (FFA), to enter a team into the top division of men's association football in Australia, the A-League Men (ALM).

== History ==
The ALM was established in 2005 as the A-League under the leadership of chairman Frank Lowy and CEO John O'Neill. Lowy, at the time, identified Canberra as a future destination for A-League expansion, having not had representation in the top level since the Canberra Cosmos folded in 2001 in the old NSL. As of 2022, there have been five bids from the Canberra region to obtain an ALM licence. Three bids have been unsuccessful with two bids are currently active and ongoing.

The first bid, A-League4Canberra, was established in 2008 but was wound up in 2012 after failing to win an A-League licence from FFA to join the league in three attempts.

The second bid, Canberra & Capital Region A-League Bid, was founded in late 2016 and formally submitted its bid to join the A-League in May 2018. The second bid was ultimately unsuccessful with the FFA selecting two other bids in December 2018.

The third bid, Capital Region Football Collective (CRFC), was founded in 2020 by the same bid team from the second bid. The third bid formally made an offer to the FFA for a licence on 25 August 2020 but was unsuccessful. Once the Australian Professional Leagues (APL) took over administration of the ALM, the team put two bids up to them to obtain a licence in early-mid 2022, but was again unsuccessful.

The fourth bid, announced in December 2021 and involving Andy Bernal and Richard Peil, is still technically active despite no further news on its progress since announcement.

The fifth bid is a December 2022 re-launch of the Capital Region Football Collective bid. After the APL identified Canberra as a preferred destination for ALM expansion in 2024–25, the bid is working on putting forward a proposal to the APL in June 2023.

== First bid (A-League4Canberra) ==
A-League4Canberra Bid
Bid name	A-League4Canberra
Competition	A-League
Nation	Australia
Federation	Football Federation Australia
Confederation	Asian Football Confederation
Bid location	(Australian Capital Territory) Canberra, ACT
Bid leader	Ivan Slavich (TransACT)
Bid model	Private consortium ownership
Bid duration	July 2008 - 10 May 2012
Bid outcome	Unsuccessful - disbanded after losing A-League expansion bids to: 2008 - North Queensland Fury, Gold Coast United; 2009 - Sydney Rovers; 2010 - Western Sydney Wanderers

A-League4Canberra, a Canberra-based consortium led by TransACT CEO Ivan Slavich, was determined to apply for and receive a licence to compete in the A-League, commencing in the 2010–11 season. FFA agreed to Slavich's request to extend the deadline for bids until August 2008, and Australian international players Carl Valeri and Ned Zelic became foundation members. However, A-League4Canberra failed to secure the 12th licence they had applied for as Sydney Rovers was later given the licence instead. The Slavich-led consortium then moved forward with the intention of competing for the 13th licence. The first formal step in that process was to present an application to the A-League Licence Review Committee in August 2008. At the time, Canberra was one of ten bids expected by FFA for up to four available licences, but was considered to be strongly positioned to succeed and had support from the highest levels within FFA.

On 5 March 2009, Canberra Stadium hosted an Asian Cup qualification match between the Socceroos and Kuwait. FFA officials said that, if Canberra attract over 20,000 to this game then they will be the likely destination for the twelfth A-League licence. The trial in Canberra saw 20,032 fans attending the match. However, in September 2009, a poor crowd to an A-League game at Canberra Stadium was recorded and doubts surfaced about the viability of the bid.

On 10 May 2012, A-League4Canberra announced that it was suspending its efforts to secure an A-League licence for the Australian capital city. The decision came in the wake of FFA's announcement that expansion beyond ten teams was on hold for the foreseeable future in preference to consolidating and strengthening the existing clubs. Capital Football CEO Heather Reid told FourFourTwo, "The ALeague4Canberra bid group is being wound up and foundation memberships will be offered back to those who signed up".

Notable supporters

- Kate Lundy – Former Australian Senator
- Jon Stanhope – Former Chief Minister of the Australian Capital Territory
- Ned Zelic – Australian men's international
- Carl Valeri – Australian men's international
- Amy Taylor – Australian women's international
- Amy Chapman – Australian women's international
- Lydia Williams – Australian women's international
- Sally Shipard – Australian women's international
- Caitlin Munoz – Australian women's international

== Second bid (Canberra & Capital Region A-League Bid) ==
Canberra & Capital Region A-League Bid
Bid name	Canberra & Capital Region A-League Bid
Competition	A-League
Nation	Australia
Federation	Football Federation Australia
Confederation	Asian Football Confederation
Bid location	(Australian Capital Territory) Canberra, ACT; Southern New South Wales (Monaro, Cootamundra, Southern Tablelands, South Coast, Snowy Mountains, Riverina, Border)
Bid leaders	Jeff Williamson; Michael Caggiano; Bede Gahan
Bid model	Community ownership (50+1)
Bid duration	October 2016 - 13 December 2018
Bid outcome	Unsuccessful - bid not selected by FFA in December 2018; Selected bids were Western Melbourne Group and South West Sydney.
Website	Official website

After the announcement of bids to join the A-League were announced in 2016 by Tasmania and South Melbourne, there were discussions about whether Canberra should bid again. Jeff Williamson formed the current Canberra A-League bid team and began investigating the business case for Canberra to enter the A-League. Confirmation of the new Canberra A-League bid came from Capital Football when Football Federation Australia (FFA) gave indications that they intended to expand the A-League by at least two teams. In the middle of negotiations surrounding a new broadcast deal with a mix of pay and free to air operators, the FFA approached its broadcast partners in an effort to gain an understanding of where they would want A-League expansion to occur. Football Federation Australia announced on 28 February 2017 that they would not be expanding due to the current A-League model not being able to cope with an expanded 12 team league. Speculation of an expansion of the A-League continued with bids from other cities being announced.

16 February 2018, Football Federation Australia announced the A-league would expand from 10 teams to 12 with two new licences to be tendered to interested parties with an expression of interest (EOI) round due May 2018, a shortlist to be announced in June 2018 and the final decision made on 31 October 2018.

In April 2018, Jeff Williamson and Michael Caggiano from the Canberra A-league bid team met with Capital Football to discuss the bid and cement the working relationship with the ACT football and the 30,000 registered players in the city.

15 May 2018, the Canberra A-League bid puts its support behind the proposal for a new $350 million Civic Stadium in the heart of Canberra. ACT Chief Minister, Andrew Barr, had stated that the only chance for a new stadium to be built is for the venue to be utilised year round by at least 3 tenants. An A-League team is key to Canberra building a new fully roofed stadium in the City that would house the Canberra Raiders, Brumbies and the proposed yet to be named A-League team.

16 May 2018, the Canberra & Capital Region A-League bid announced further detail of its 'community ownership model' mirroring the 50+1 rule imposed on German clubs by the DFB (Deutscher Fußball-Bund). This model provides the community the guarantee to be majority shareholder and have direct influence in how the organisation is run and what it stands for. The bid team revealed the community would decide on a club name, colours, crest, ticketing and match-day experiences. The bid wanted to establish a sustainable model that had longevity so steered clear of 'billionaire backers'. Out of the $10–12 million yearly operating budget to run a team the bulk of costs would be covered from the ACT Government, the A-League broadcast deal and match day revenue. The $3–5 million shortfall would be made up through sponsorships.

25 May 2018, Canberra officially submitted its EOI to FFA along with fourteen other interested parties across Australia, including four from New South Wales, three from Queensland, four from Victoria and one each from South Australia, Tasmania and Western Australia.

Following the announcement that Canberra had submitted an EOI application and kicked off its bid, fellow bidder, the Wollongong Wolves, confirmed they welcomed the friendly competition from the Canberra bid and re-stated their commitment to the region no matter what the outcome on October. The Wolves have a player pathway partnership established with Belconnen United FC. Rugby union Super League team Brumbies CEO Michael Thomson also fronted the media to state his support for the Canberra A-League bid stating there is enough fans to go around for the Brumbies, Raiders and an A-League team. Mr Thomson went on to say he felt another top level sporting code could enrich the Canberra community.

11 June 2018, FFA delayed the announcement of the shortlist of the fifteen bidding parties for the two A-League licences by at least one week. The FFA said the delay was due to clarifications sought in relation to some bids intended funding models.

29 June 2018, the governing body announced its shortlist of bids for the two A-League licences. Ten bids progressed to the next phase with five bids cut from the process. Canberra's bid was selected as one of the ten successful bids to progress. The FFA then revealed final applications from the ten bids would be due in two months (September 2018). On the same day as Canberra's shortlisting announcement, Canberra bid leader, Michael Caggiano, advised the Canberra bid would swiftly move to establish the first stage of its community model as well as enter into talks with both the ACT and Federal governments.

10 July 2018, Canberra's A-League bid team announced the first Canberra A-League membership would be named after Steve Doszpot OAM. Doszpot was a former president of Capital Football between 1995 and 2002 and was involved with the Canberra Cosmos. He was responsible for bringing football to Canberra at the Sydney Olympics in 2000, assisted in the establishment of Canberra City FC in the now defunct National Soccer League (NSL) in 1977 as well as lure former Australian international Johnny Warren to coach the new club. Deszpot's widow Maureen Doszpot was named the number one membership holder in honor of Doszpot's name.

11 July 2018, The Canberra bid opened up foundation membership applications with the goal of reaching 5,000 members as well as partnering with the re-formed Capital Punishment active supporter group.

18-19 July 2018, Canberra's A-league bid put out expressions of interest to grow its volunteer team base, announced foundation membership had reached over 2,500 and confirmed discussions had taken place to establish the AIS Bruce campus as an initial training base. In addition the bid team revealed they were exploring commercial space options to headquarter the club.

25 July 2018, Canberra's A-league bid announced a community forum to be hosted at Woden's Hellenic Club to discuss with founding members and the public a range of topics regarding the bid and what club the community wants to see built. It was also revealed that the bid had gathered over 3,000 members prior to the next push with volunteers on the ground at the FFA Cup match between Canberra FC and Broadmeadow Magic.

28 July 2018, Griffith based club Riverina Rhinos, who compete in Capital Football NPL competitions, officially backed the Canberra & Capital Region A-League bid. Rhinos head coach, Gabriel Abdala, believed that a Canberra-based A-League team would provide Riverina juniors and seniors a pathway to the elite level of Australian football that is currently lacking.

1 August 2018, it was revealed Canberra's A-League bid had been in negotiations for some time and were close to signing a partnership agreement with one of two unnamed European football clubs that compete in the UEFA Champions League. The deal would be similar to the partnership between Melbourne and Manchester City. The Canberra bid also revealed membership numbers had reached over 4,000 with one month to go before the final submission would be handed to FFA.

On the same day bid team member, Russ Gibbs, spoke to the media regarding the bid's plans for the women's game. He acknowledged Canberra is unique in that it already has a well-established championship-winning national team in Canberra United FC. Canberra United is owned and run by Capital Football and while it is separate from the new A-League bid it is hoped down the track a partnership is created to effectively establish a one club identity to represent Canberra and the region. Mr Gibbs did stress that there was no plans on transferring ownership of the W-League club away from its current ownership. Mr Gibbs finished by saying it would be up to the community to determine the name of the A-League team so if it is different to Canberra United and down the track Canberra United's W-League team does not want to change names then a two name identity might be a possibility.

3 August 2018. Canberra's A-League bid signed an agreement with the Australian Sports Foundation that will enable people the facilitation of private and philanthropic investment in the proposed A-League team. Bid organiser, Michael Caggiano, stated this partnership would build "philanthropic and community giving into its strategic plan".

7 August 2018, Canberra's A-league bid announced it had reached its initial target of 5,000 members a month ahead of schedule. It set a new lofty target of 10,000 to reach in the final month before the bid is submitted. The Bid team also revealed it now had over 100 volunteers helping with the bid.

9 August 2018, the Canberra A-League bid made public the appointment of Ron Smith to the role of Director of Football. Ron smith is the former head coach at the AIS football program between 1986 and 1996 that developed future national team players such as Mark Viduka, Lucas Neil, John Aloisi and Brett Emerton among others. Ron Smith's role with the Canberra A-League bid includes orchestrating talent identification, coaching appointments and the development of a high performance program and local player pathways should the bid be successful in gaining an A-League licence. Bid leader, Michael Caggiano, told reporters present at the unveiling in front of the AIS "Ron has a vision for football in the Canberra and Capital region, a blueprint that has worked on a national level that he knows can be replicated throughout the wide talent base that exists in our community,"

13 August 2018, Canberra's A-league bid team revealed the desire to establish an eSports team to compete in the FFA organised E-League. The E-League is an online gaming league comprising A-league clubs who send representatives to compete in a round-robin tournament of FIFA (video game). The Canberra bid team encouraged local FIFA players to participate in a Canberra-based tournament the bid set up called the 'Capital Cup'.

14 August 2018, Federal ACT minister, Andrew Leigh, made public his support for the Canberra and Capital region A-League bid. Leigh spoke in the ACT Federation Chamber about how the bid reflected the community, encouraged people to put their name to the cause and stated how the Canberra region is the largest in Australia that lacks presentation in the A-league. Mr Leigh went on to praise the work of the bid team in their preparation for the final submission on August 31.

20 August 2018, the Canberra bid made the first appointment of their corporate and international strategy advisory board by announcing the appointment of Jo Metcalfe, current senior executive of global professional services firm GHD. Jo Metcalfe will be assisting the bid with its infrastructure plans and investments as well as assists with building Asian connections. Jo is a former member of the University of Canberra council and winner of the prestigious Female Champion of Change award in 2016.

24 August 2018, Ex-Canberra Cosmos player and current Singapore based sports executive, Pj Roberts, was made the second appointment to the Canberra & Capital region A-league bid's advisory board. Roberts will work with the bid to advice on potential commercial operations and build corporate support within the Asian region. The ex-Weston Creek junior has spent the last sixteen years based in Singapore and has been a regular football analyst for Fox Sports Asia.

28 August 2018, Australian men's international and former Canberra junior, Tom Rogic, made public his support for the Canberra & Capital region A-League bid after being approached by Canberra-based player agent Andy Bernal on behalf of the bid team. Rogic, who currently plays for Celtic FC, supported creating a clear pathway for the region's talent to work through to reach professional football and highlighted his own unorthodox pathway to professional football as a reason why it was important to establish a Canberra-based A-League team.

31 August 2018, The Canberra A-League bid secured an agreement with the ACT Government for an annual investment of $1.2 million into the team if successful. A few hours later the bid team submitted their final bid to the FFA.

After the expansion announcement, the FFA has continued to discuss the entry of Canberra & Capital Region into the A-League.

It has been revealed that the contract between the FFA and Fox Sports (A-League broadcaster) meant that additional payment for the expanded A-League competition would only occur if Football Federation Australia selected expansion teams from Sydney and Melbourne.

At a fan forum organised by FFA held in Canberra on May 8, 2019, FFA Chief Executive Officer, David Gallop, and FFA Head of A-League, Greg O'Rourke, indicated that an A-League team for Canberra was very likely in the next round of expansion. No timetable was given, but the expectation was that it would be within four years.

== Third bid (Capital Region Football Collective) ==
Capital Region Football Collective
Bid name	Capital Region Football Collective
Competition	A-League
Nation	Australia
Federation	Football Australia
Confederation	Asian Football Confederation
Bid location	(Australian Capital Territory) Canberra, ACT; Southern New South Wales (Monaro, Cootamundra, Southern Tablelands, South Coast, Snowy Mountains, Riverina, Border)
Bid leaders	Jeff Williamson; Michael Caggiano; Bede Gahan
Bid model	Community ownership (50+1)
Bid duration	August 2020 – June 2022
Bid outcome	Unsuccessful - Multiple proposals submitted to FA followed by the APL, no license obtained.
Website	Official website

25 August 2020, the previous Canberra bidding team announced a new proposal to obtain a licence for a Canberra-based A-League team had been submitted to the FFA. The new bid was named Capital Region Football Collective (CRFC). The official proposal submitted had multi-million dollar backing from local and international sources. The proposal sought a licence to be issued with a view for a team to enter the league in the 2021/22 season. The bid team expressed their desire to secure the thirteenth A-League licence, however they would also be open to buying out the Central Coast Mariners' licence if the FFA did not want to issue a new licence. Mike Charlesworth had put the Mariners licence up for sale a week earlier. The Canberra bidding team put a four to six week timeframe on receiving an answer from the FFA.

27 August 2020, Capital Football chief executive, Phil Brown, announced the organisation's support for the new bid and interest in entering into discussions regarding a potential partnership with their successful women's program, Canberra United FC.

2 September 2020, it was reported that if CRFC was successful in obtaining a licence, the new $20 million ACT Home of Football training and administration facility in Canberra's north, would be completed in time to accept a new tenant. Capital Football's chair, Fran Sankey, indicated that the new facility, due for opening in 2021, could be expanded if an A-League tenant joined.

11 September 2020, former Australian national team captain, Craig Moore, joined the Canberra A-League bid team. Moore was appointed to the football department to work alongside Ron Smith. Former Australian striker and A-League head coach, John Aloisi also announced his support for the Canberra bid.

3 November 2021, after months of no communication from the Capital Region Football Collective, it was confirmed that the bidding team was still active in pursuing an A-League Men's license for Canberra. Canberra and Capital Region A-League Pty Limited remained a registered business and the new football club championship trophy presented a stronger case for a Canberra A-League Men's team to be admitted to the league.

In February and June 2022, Capital Region Football Collective made two pitches to the Australian Professional Leagues (APL). No license was obtained from these pitches.

== Fourth bid (Unnamed Andy Bernal bid) ==
Unnamed Andy Bernal bid
Bid name	Unnamed Andy Bernal bid
Competition	A-League Men
Nation	Australia
Federation	Football Australia (FA)
Confederation	Asian Football Confederation
Bid location	(Australian Capital Territory) Canberra, ACT
Bid leaders	Andy Bernal; Richard Peil
Bid model	Private consortium ownership
Bid duration	December 2021 – Present
Bid outcome	Ongoing - Bid announced publicly
Website	

8 December 2021, a new bid, fourth bid, was launched to obtain a license for an A-league Men's team to be based in Canberra. The latest bid would rival the still active Capital Region Football Collective bid. The bid is headed by former Australian national team player and Canberra export, Andy Bernal with Anytime Fitness CEO, Richard Peil, appointed CEO of the new proposed organisation. The bid proposal is for a wholly private consortium ownership model and incorporates a business and football plan. MATE telecommunications was named as a financial backer of the new bid.

== Fifth bid (Capital Region Football Collective) ==
Capital Region Football Collective
Bid name	Capital Region Football Collective
Competition	A-League Men
Nation	Australia
Federation	Football Australia (FA)
Confederation	Asian Football Confederation
Bid location	(Australian Capital Territory) Canberra, ACT; Southern New South Wales (Monaro, Cootamundra, Southern Tablelands, South Coast, Snowy Mountains, Riverina, Border)
Bid leaders	Michael Caggiano; Bede Gahan
Bid model	To be announced
Bid duration	December 2022 – Present
Bid outcome	Ongoing - Bid preparing proposal to the APL, due for submission in June 2023.
Website	Official website

In December 2022, the Capital Region Football Collective bid to join the A-League was relaunched, despite maintaining continual dialog in the background with the APL since the last bid failed to materialise into a license. The bidding team confirmed it had been approached by the APL to open negotiations about an expansion license and the two parties had met in the week leading up to Christmas. On 15 March 2023, the APL announced Canberra as one of two preferred locations for A-League Men's expansion in 2024-25, along with New Zealand city Auckland. Canberra and Auckland were selected from an internal APL process that considered 13 different expansion market options. The APL set a soft-date target of June 2023 for a formal bid submission to be provided to them from interested parties from the two identified cities. Bid Director, Michael Caggiano, responded to Canberra's shortlisting by the APL by saying he was confident in bringing in private sector, government and community investors for a fourth time to raise the $25 million needed for the license. The possibility of a Canberra A-League Men's team being granted a license brought with it questions regarding how this will affect the Canberra United A-League Women's team, who are owned and operated by Capital Football, as well as the ACT Government's plans for a future Civic Stadium project and the ACT Home of Football training and administration precinct project. The day after the APL announcement, key ACT figures announced their support for the latest bid, including, Capital Football boss, a former head of the first Canberra A-League bid, Ivan Slavich, ACT Sport Minister Yvette Berry and ACT Federal Senator David Pocock. Current Adelaide United head coach, Carl Veart, also threw his support behind the expansion of the A-League Men to Canberra and Auckland.

== See also ==
- Expansion of the A-League
- Canberra United FC
- Soccer in the Australian Capital Territory
- List of fan-owned sports teams
