= 2024 A-League Men Grand Final =

2024 edition of the A-League Men Grand Final

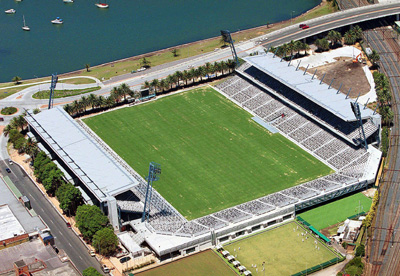
- The match was held at Central Coast Stadium
- Event: 2023–24 A-League Men
Central Coast Mariners	Melbourne Victory
3	1
- After extra time
- Date: 25 May 2024
- Venue: Central Coast Stadium, Gosford
- Joe Marston Medal: Ryan Edmondson (Central Coast Mariners)
- Referee: Alex King
- Attendance: 21,379

The 2024 A-League Men Grand Final, known officially as the Isuzu UTE A-League Grand Final, was a soccer match that was played between Central Coast Mariners and Melbourne Victory on 25 May 2024 at Central Coast Stadium in Gosford, Australia. The match determined the champions of the A-League Men and was the 19th A-League Men Grand Final, the culmination of the 2023–24 season. This was the first Grand Final since 2019 to not feature Melbourne City.

The match was refereed by Alex King. Central Coast Mariners won 3–1 in extra time to win their second consecutive championship. The Mariners achieved the first treble by an A-League club. Ryan Edmondson was awarded the Joe Marston Medal and Josh Nisbet was awarded the Johnny Warren Medal at the trophy ceremony. Mariners' head coach Mark Jackson was named A-League Men Coach of the Year on the same day. Miguel Di Pizio became the youngest scorer for his goal in the match while Danny Vukovic became the oldest to feature in a Grand Final.

A total of 21,379 spectators attended the match, a record at the stadium. Victory's head coach Tony Popovic suffered his fifth defeat in a Grand Final in what was the seventh appearance for Melbourne Victory.

Vukovic and Victory player Leigh Broxham retired from professional football after the match.

== Background ==
Central Coast Mariners were playing their second consecutive A-League Men Grand Final, the first time in the club's history, having won in the previous Grand Final against Melbourne City. The Mariners came into the final as premiers and previously won the minor premiership twice in the 2007–08 and 2011–12 seasons, claiming one Grand Final win in 2013 out of four appearances during that time. The club also won the AFC Cup during their 2023–24 campaign and were competing for the first treble achieved by an A-League club.

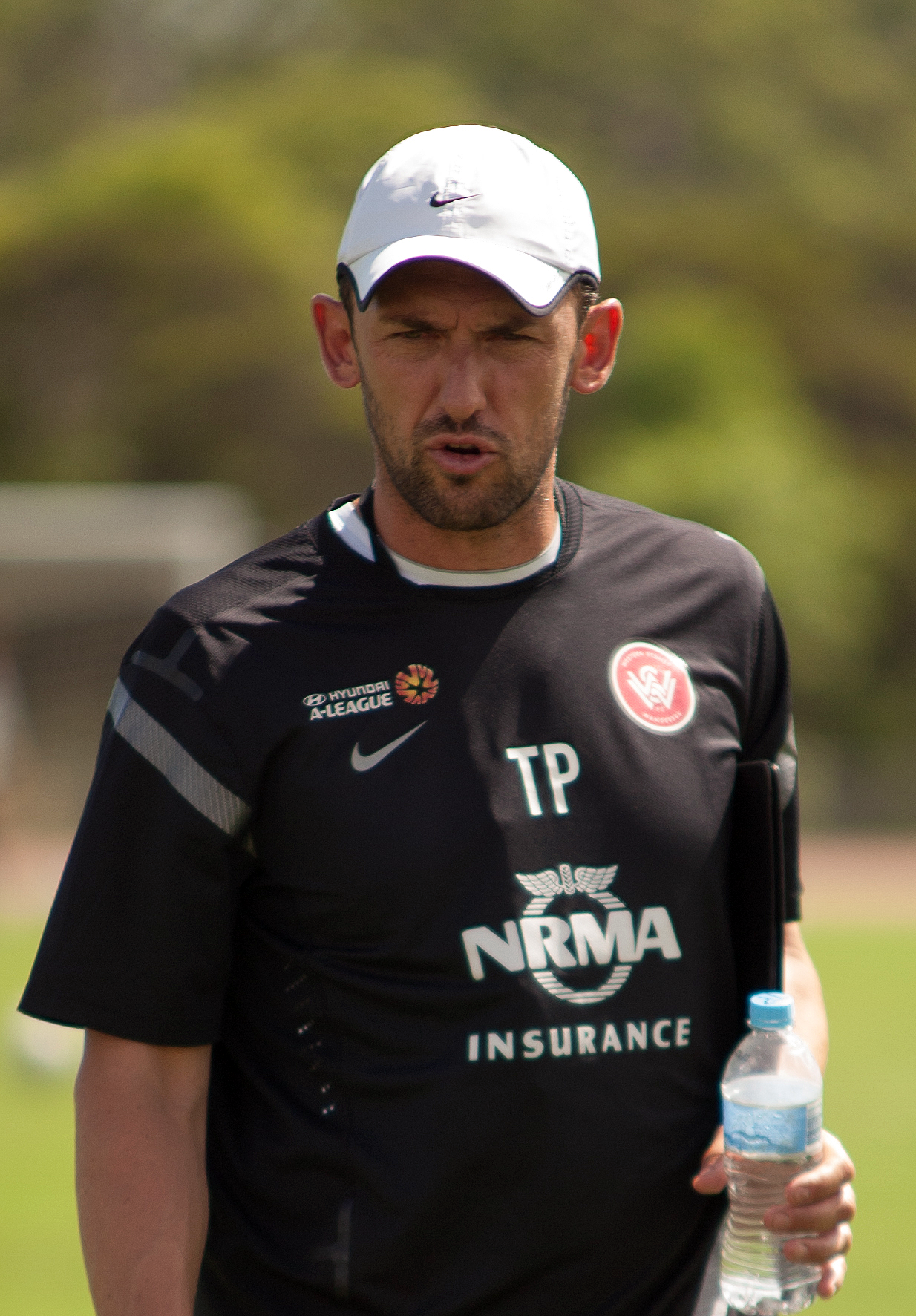
Tony Popovic managed his fifth Grand Final in his career.

For Melbourne Victory, the club were playing in their seventh Grand Final and the first since 2018 where they won their fourth championship. The club was competing for their fifth Grand Final win and to equal the record for most championships to Big Blue rivals Sydney FC. Victory's Tony Popovic made his fifth Grand Final appearance as head coach, having done so three times for Western Sydney Wanderers and once for Perth Glory in the 2019 final, all of which have ended in defeats. Popovic took Melbourne Victory to one final, winning the 2021 FFA Cup. In the table, Central Coast Mariners finished in first, 13 points above Melbourne Victory who sat in third with 42 points and two points separated from Wellington Phoenix in second.

=== Previous finals ===
In the following table, finals until 2004 were in the National Soccer League era, since 2006 were in the A-League Men era.

Team	Previous grand final appearances (bold indicates winners)
Central Coast Mariners	5 (2006, 2008, 2011, **2013**, **2023**)
Melbourne Victory	6 (**2007**, **2009**, 2010, **2015**, 2017, **2018**)

== Road to the final ==
=== Summary ===
Following the regular season, a five-week Finals Series is played to determine the winner of the A-League Championship. The top two highest-placed teams are given a bye into the semi-finals, while third to sixth are drawn into the elimination finals; both third and fourth hosts against the sixth and fifth-placed sides respectively. The winners progress to a two-legged semi-final, first introduced in the 2021–22 season, with the first leg played at the home stadium of the lowest-ranked club. Both legs' results are put into an aggregate score to decide the winner that will face each other in the Grand Final. If the aggregate scores are level, the second match will go into extra time, and then to a penalty shoot-out if the score remains level. The Away Goals rule is not used in the semi-finals. The finalists who placed highest on the table will host the Grand Final. The finals series will also utilise a video assistant referee (VAR) announcement for the first time in the league's history which allows referees decisions to be announced after a video review. The A-League became the first league of the Asian Football Confederation (AFC) to implement this.

In the 2023–24 season, Central Coast Mariners and Wellington Phoenix were the two highest-placed teams. The Mariners won the premiership in the last game of the season after a 2–0 win against Adelaide United on 1 May 2024. Prior to that match, Wellington held a one-point lead in first. Both teams were given a bye to the semi-finals. Melbourne Victory and Sydney FC finished in third and fourth respectively and acted as hosts for the elimination finals. Macarthur FC and Melbourne City rounded out the top six after placing in fifth and sixth respectively. The second match of the elimination final had its scheduled time changed from 3 p.m. to 5 p.m. (AEST) on 5 May. Sydney FC played Macarthur on the day before at Sydney Football Stadium and defeated the Bulls 4–0 to progress to the semi-final.

Central Coast Mariners				Round	Melbourne Victory			
2023–24 A-League Men 1st placed / Premiers: Pos / Team / Pld / Pts; 1 / Central Coast Mariners (C) / 27 / 55; 2 / Wellington Phoenix / 27 / 53; 3 / Melbourne Victory / 27 / 42; 4 / Sydney FC / 27 / 41; 5 / Macarthur FC / 27 / 41; Source: A-Leagues (C) Champions				Regular season	2023–24 A-League Men 3rd placed: Pos / Team / Pld / Pts; 1 / Central Coast Mariners (C) / 27 / 55; 2 / Wellington Phoenix / 27 / 53; 3 / Melbourne Victory / 27 / 42; 4 / Sydney FC / 27 / 41; 5 / Macarthur FC / 27 / 41; Source: A-Leagues (C) Champions			
Opponent	Score			Elimination-finals	Opponent	Score		
Bye				Elimination-finals	Melbourne City	1–1 (a.e.t.) (3–2 p) (H)		
Opponent	Agg.	1st leg	2nd leg	Semi-finals	Opponent	Agg.	1st leg	2nd leg
Sydney FC	2–1	2–1 (A)	0–0 (H)	Semi-finals	Wellington Phoenix	2–1	0–0 (H)	2–1 (a.e.t.) (A)

=== Central Coast Mariners ===
Central Coast Mariners' opponent for the semi-final was drawn to be Sydney FC and was played on 10 May in Sydney. The first-leg ended in a 2–1 win for the Mariners after a goal each for Josh Nisbet and Mikael Doka, from a penalty, overturned the one-goal lead scored from Joel King for Sydney FC. The Sky Blues had two players sent-off after Jack Rodwell and Corey Hollman were given red cards. Rodwell received an initial yellow card for a dangerous challenge on Christian Theoharous before a straight red was shown, following a review by video assistant referee (VAR). The second leg was played eight days later at Central Coast Stadium in front of a sell-out crowd in Gosford. The match ended in a goalless draw, 2–1 on aggregate, allowing Central Coast Mariners to progress to the final. During the match, Mariners' assistant coach Danny Schofield was sent-off for his disputes on a challenge by Max Burgess on Jacob Farrell. Anthony Caceres was given a red card in the final minutes for dissent to referee Alireza Faghani.

=== Melbourne Victory ===
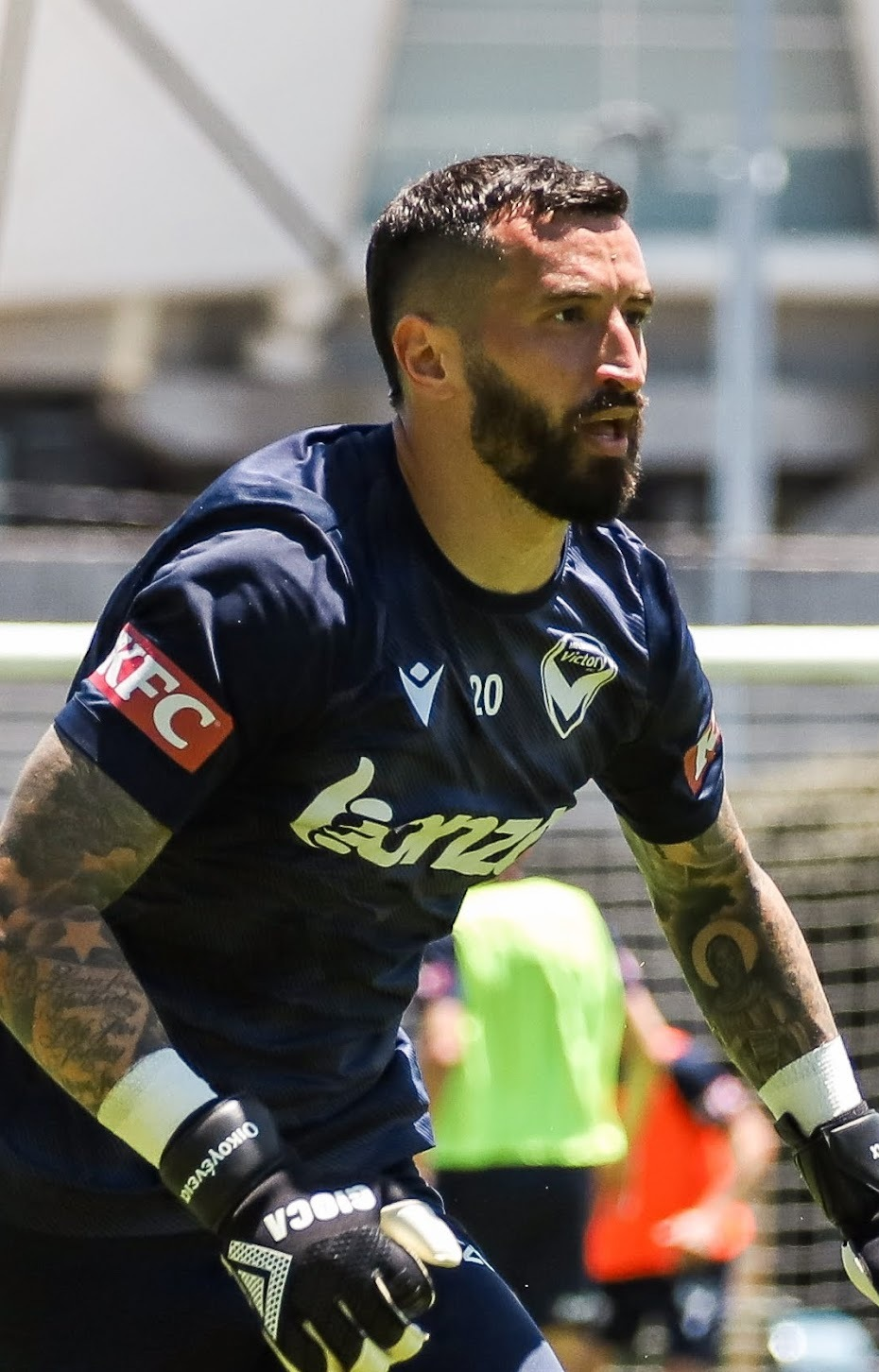
Paul Izzo played for Melbourne Victory during the finals series

Melbourne Victory, as a result of finishing third, were required to play in the elimination final against Melbourne City in a Melbourne Derby, the first meeting to be played in a finals series since 2015. The match ended in a 3–2 penalty shoot-out win for Melbourne Victory after a 1–1 scoreline in regular time on 5 May. Paul Izzo was named player of the match for Victory, saving four penalties during the shoot-out, with a goal each by Nishan Velupillay and Samuel Souprayen for Victory and City respectively. Both sides had a player sent-off when Zinédine Machach and Curtis Good received a red card. Melbourne Victory faced Wellington Phoenix in the semi-final and drew a goalless scoreline in the first-leg on 12 May. The second-leg took place six days later with Melbourne winning 2–1 over Wellington in extra-time in front of 33,000 spectators at Wellington Regional Stadium. Chris Ikonomidis scored the winning goal in extra-time after Oskar Zawada equalised a late goal for the Phoenix during regular time.

== Pre-match ==
=== Venue and promotions ===
As the team that finished highest in the table, Central Coast Stadium in Gosford was the hosting venue for the A-League Men Grand Final, the first time a Grand Final was to be played at the ground. The ground has been home to Central Coast Mariners since the 2005–06 season and previously shared with the New Zealand Warriors during the pandemic. This was the second time the Mariners was named as the home side since 2008, although the venue was moved from Central Coast Stadium to Sydney Football Stadium at the time. It was also the first time the host was awarded to the highest-placed club since the reversal of the Grand Final deal in November 2023. The 2023 final, in which the Mariners had won, was hosted at Western Sydney Stadium in Parramatta and remains the only time a set venue has hosted at a Grand Final.

The match was set to be the lowest attended final in the league's history due to the 20,059 capacity in Central Coast Stadium. As a result, additional seats were installed in the ground to accommodate more spectators. Tickets were distributed on Ticketek on 20 May 2024 to club members, attached with a 10% per cent discount, before public release the next day and sold out on 24 May, including to 3,000 away fans. The venue was set to break the previous crowd record of 20,060 spectators from the Sydney Roosters of the National Rugby League in July 2017. Central Coast Council hosted a live site at Gosford Leagues Club Park to view the final with entertainment and activities for participants. A live site was also hosted at the Melbourne Rectangular Stadium for fans to watch.

=== Broadcasting ===
The Grand Final was broadcast live on Network 10 in Australia, Sky Sport in New Zealand, and streamed on Paramount+ and 10Play. This was the third Grand Final broadcast on Network 10 and Paramount+ since the networks were contracted in May 2021. The broadcast reached 1.12 million viewers in Australia on Network 10, 10 Play and Paramount+, which was the highest viewership for an A-League match on the services and second most-watched program on the day. For the 2023–24 season, the total viewers combined during the season of the A-League Men and A-League Women was 5.72 million which saw a 16% increase in broadcast television viewership, 33% on 10 Play and 53% on Paramount+.

=== Build-up to Final ===
In the three matches played between Central Coast Mariners and Melbourne Victory during the 2023–24 A-League Men, the two clubs drew twice in their first two meetings. The only win for either side came in the third meeting with a 1–0 victory for the Mariners in Melbourne. In previous meetings, Victory has met Central Coast 54 times, winning 25 matches and losing 13 times against their opposition. Before the final, Bruno Fornaroli led as the top goal scorer of the two clubs with 18 goals during the season for Melbourne and sat second in the goalscoring table behind Adam Taggart. Josh Nisbet led in assists with a total of nine, the second-highest in the league behind Anthony Caceres.

The referee for the 2024 Grand Final was Alex King, representing Football Queensland. King officiated his first A-League Men Grand Final in his career, having had a previous appearance as a fourth official in the 2020 final. Kearney Robinson and Brad Wright were named as the assistant referees, with Adam Kersey appointed as the fourth official. Representing Football NSW, Kearney made his fifth appearance in the Grand Final and his second as an assistant while Wright made his debut as assistant referee. Shaun Evans was the video assistant referee (VAR) with Kris Griffiths-Jones and Richard Naumovski to assist him. Hugh Fenton-White was named as the reserve assistant referee.

Melbourne Victory announced two changes to their squad with Leigh Broxham and Zinédine Machach, who returned from a two-match suspension. Central Coast Mariners also announced two changes to the side, with Dylan Wenzel-Halls and Bailey Brandtman, to replace Noah Smith and Sasha Kuzevski due to injury. Broxham would feature in his last match for Melbourne after announcing his retirement in April. In the starting line-up, Mark Jackson named an unchanged line-up from their previous match against Sydney FC while Tony Popovic named two changes from their match against Wellington Phoenix, with Machach and Salim Khelifi replacing Roly Bonevacia and Nishan Velupillay.

== Match ==
=== Details ===
25 May 2024
19:45 AEST (UTC+10:00)

Central Coast Mariners	3–1 (a.e.t.)	Melbourne Victory
Edmondson 90+1', 120+1'; Di Pizio 97'	Report	Geria 50'

Central Coast Stadium, Gosford
Attendance: 21,379
Referee: Alex King

Central Coast Mariners	Melbourne Victory

GK	20	(Australia) Danny Vukovic (c)
CB	23	(Fiji) Dan Hall
CB	26	(Malaysia) Brad Tapp		(substituted off) 70'
CB	3	(Vanuatu) Brian Kaltak
RWB	15	(New Zealand) Storm Roux		(substituted off) 70'
LWB	18	(Australia) Jacob Farrell	(yellow card) 83'
DM	6	(Australia) Max Balard
RM	2	(Brazil) Mikael Doka
CM	4	(Australia) Josh Nisbet
LM	7	(Australia) Christian Theoharous		(substituted off) 57'
CF	9	(Australia) Alou Kuol		(substituted off) 46'
Substitutes:
GK	30	(Australia) Jack Warshawsky
DF	33	(Australia) Nathan Paull
MF	16	(Australia) Harry Steele		(substituted on) 70'
MF	39	(Australia) Miguel Di Pizio		(substituted on) 57'
FW	17	(Australia) Jing Reec
FW	22	(Brazil) Ronald Barcellos		(substituted on) 70'
FW	99	(England) Ryan Edmondson		(substituted on) 46'
Manager:
(England) Mark Jackson

GK	20	(Australia) Paul Izzo
RB	2	(Australia) Jason Geria
CB	5	(France) Damien Da Silva	(yellow card) 106'
CB	21	(Portugal) Roderick Miranda (c)
LB	25	(Australia) Ryan Teague
DM	27	(Australia) Jordi Valadon		(substituted off) 90+1'
CM	23	(Tunisia) Salim Khelifi		(substituted off) 58'
CM	3	(Ivory Coast) Adama Traoré	(yellow card) 21'	(substituted off) 115'
RF	19	(Australia) Daniel Arzani	(yellow card) 70'	(substituted off) 75'
CF	10	(Australia) Bruno Fornaroli		(substituted off) 90+1'
LF	8	(France) Zinédine Machach		(substituted off) 75'
Substitutes:
GK	40	(Australia) Christian Siciliano
MF	14	(Australia) Connor Chapman		(substituted on) 115'
MF	22	(Australia) Jake Brimmer		(substituted on) 90+1'
MF	28	(Curaçao) Roly Bonevacia		(substituted on) 75'
FW	7	(Australia) Chris Ikonomidis		(substituted on) 90+1'
FW	11	(Australia) Ben Folami		(substituted on) 75'
FW	17	(Australia) Nishan Velupillay		(substituted on) 58'
Manager:
(Australia) Tony Popovic

Man of the Match (Joe Marston Medal):
Ryan Edmondson (Central Coast Mariners)

Assistant referees:
Kearney Robinson
Brad Wright
Fourth official:
Adam Kersey
Video assistant referee:
Shaun Evans
Assistant video assistant referees:
Kris Griffiths-Jones
Richard Naumovski

Match rules

- 90 minutes.
- 30 minutes of extra time if necessary.
- Penalty shoot-out if scores still level.
- Seven named substitutes.
- Maximum of five substitutions, with a sixth allowed in extra time. (Note: Each team was given only three opportunities to make substitutions, with a fourth opportunity in extra time, excluding substitutions made at half-time, before the start of extra time and at half-time in extra time.)

=== Statistics ===
First half
Statistic	Central Coast Mariners	Melbourne Victory
Goals scored	0	0
Total shots	1	4
Shots on target	0	1
Saves	1	0
Ball possession	60%	40%
Corner kicks	1	2
Fouls committed	6	8
Offsides	0	0
Yellow cards	0	1
Red cards	0	0

Second half
Statistic	Central Coast Mariners	Melbourne Victory
Goals scored	1	1
Total shots	3	3
Shots on target	1	2
Saves	1	0
Ball possession	47%	53%
Corner kicks	3	0
Fouls committed	6	6
Offsides	0	0
Yellow cards	1	1
Red cards	0	0

Extra time
Statistic	Central Coast Mariners	Melbourne Victory
Goals scored	2	0
Total shots	3	9
Shots on target	2	1
Saves	1	0
Ball possession	33%	67%
Corner kicks	0	2
Fouls committed	5	4
Offsides	0	1
Yellow cards	0	1
Red cards	0	0

Overall
Statistic	Central Coast Mariners	Melbourne Victory
Goals scored	3	1
Total shots	7	16
Shots on target	3	4
Saves	3	0
Ball possession	48%	52%
Corner kicks	4	4
Fouls committed	17	18
Offsides	0	1
Yellow cards	1	3
Red cards	0	0

== Post-match ==
Central Coast Mariners achieved what has been called a treble by those who consider finishing 1st in the A-League regular season to be the equivalent of the Australia Cup, which the Mariners did not win that season. They became the first A-League team to finish 1st in the A-League regular season then win the Grand Final and win an Asian competition, with the Championship, Premiership, and AFC Cup won during the 2023–24 season; Melbourne Victory and Sydney FC had previously achieved the Australian version of a "domestic treble" by simultaneously holding the A-League Premiership, A-League Championship and Australia Cup. The Mariners also achieved two consecutive Grand Finals wins for the first time in club history and the third A-League team to do so after Sydney FC in 2020 and Brisbane Roar in 2012. As premiers, Central Coast Mariners entered the 2024–25 AFC Champions League Elite.

Around 21,379 fans attended the match, the highest crowd recorded in Central Coast Stadium, and a pitch invasion ensued when the full-time whistle was called. Before the trophy was brought, fans were removed from the pitch as per police's requests. After the match, the 2023–24 squad of the Central Coast Mariners was named as one of the best teams in Australian history, compared to Ange Postecoglou's Roar, that went 36 games unbeaten until 2011, and Graham Arnold's 2016–17 season with Sydney FC. Ángel Torres finished as the top goalscorer for the club despite being absent from the match due to charges brought by the NSW police.

At the trophy ceremony, Ryan Edmondson was given the Joe Marston Medal for his two goals in the match. Josh Nisbet was awarded the Johnny Warren Medal and head coach Mark Jackson was named the A-League Men Coach of the Year. It was Jackson's first season as head coach for the Mariners after Nick Montgomery departed in the previous season. With his first medal as best player, Nisbet placed first in votes ahead of Bruno Fornaroli, who finished second in the Golden Boot, and Kosta Barbarouses. After scoring the second goal for Central Coast, Miguel Di Pizio became the youngest player to score at a Grand Final, aged 18 years, 4 months, and 22 days old, while Danny Vukovic became the oldest player to play in an A-League Grand Final at 39 years and 58 days old. Vukovic announced his retirement from professional football the next day, on 26 May 2024, at the club's season celebration in Erina Fair. For Melbourne Victory, Leigh Broxham, who was not selected for the match squad, retired with the most appearances made in the A-League after making 389 league appearances for Victory.

Jackson was confident about the win and praised his side's determination to comeback despite going down early into the second half. He gave credit to assistant Danny Schofield, who was suspended from the semi-final, for the work and success made during the season. Edmondson also praised the staff and players for the hard work brought in the season, saying he is "grateful for each and every person out here, it’s not just a football club". In contrast, Tony Popovic was distraught for his side's loss, assuring that his side should have won the match. He added that he "felt for the supporters" who travelled from Melbourne and promised to change his Grand Final losing streak; Popovic ended up departing as Victory manager a little over a fortnight after the match.
