= Sydney Rovers FC =

Sydney Rovers
- Full name: Sydney Rovers Football Club
- Nickname: Rovers
- Founded: 2009
- Dissolved: 2010
Home colours	Away colours

Sydney Rovers Football Club was a proposed professional Australian football (soccer) club to be based in Western Sydney, New South Wales. as part of a possible expansion of the A-League, the club was planned to be a franchise in the A-League from the 2011–12 season.

== Expansion bid ==
Led by businessman Ian Rowden, the bid for a new Sydney team in the A-League received the rights for the league's 12th licence in September 2009. Rowden's group was awarded the licence to join the A-League's 2011–12 season on 29 September 2009. After many months of delays and scrutiny, the Sydney Rovers bid was declined entry into the 2011–12 A-League season, making way for a more financial and technically sound bid.

On 10 December 2010 the provisional licence was formally withdrawn by the FFA. Two years later the Western Sydney region finally gained an A-League side when the Western Sydney Wanderers were announced, their debut season being the 2012–13 A-League season.

== Stadium ==
It was undecided where the club would play home games but Parramatta Stadium and Penrith Stadium were the main grounds the club was considering. The club also suggested that home games be alternated between Parramatta and Penrith to appeal to a wide range of fans across Western Sydney.

On 5 July 2010 it was confirmed that Parramatta Stadium, Penrith Stadium, Sydney Showground Stadium and Campbelltown Stadium were bidding to be Sydney Rovers' home ground for the inaugural season in 2011–12 with Stadium Australia confirming they were only bidding for a handful of marquee games.

== Ownership ==
The Rovers foundation board members included Ian Rowden, his partner at law firm DLA Phillip Fox, Peter Tredinnick, former Socceroo John Moore, Director of Global Brands and former Olympic marketing executive and former Socceroo great, Charlie Yankos.

== See also ==
- Expansion of the A-League
