= A-League Men =

Association football league in Australia

- Organising body: Football Australia (2004–2020); Australian Professional Leagues (2020–present)
- Founded: April 2004; 22 years ago
- First season: 2005–06
- Country: Australia (10 teams)
- Other club from: New Zealand (2 teams)
- Confederation: AFC
- Number of clubs: 12
- Level on pyramid: 1
- Domestic cup: Australia Cup
- International cups: AFC Champions League Elite; AFC Champions League Two
- Current champions: Auckland FC (1st title) (2025–26)
- Current premiers: Newcastle Jets (1st title) (2025–26)
- Most championships: Sydney FC (5 titles)
- Most premierships: Sydney FC (4 titles)
- Most appearances: Leigh Broxham (371)
- Top scorer: Jamie Maclaren (154)
- Broadcasters: Australia: Network 10 Paramount+; New Zealand: Sky Open Sky Sport; International: Broadcasters
- Website: aleagues.com.au/a-league-men/
- Current: 2026–27 A-League Men

A-League Men is a professional association football league in Australia and New Zealand and the highest level of the Australian soccer league system. Established in 2004 as the A-League by the Australian Soccer Association (ASA) as a successor to the National Soccer League (NSL), competition commenced in August 2005.

Administered by Australian Professional Leagues (APL), it is contested by twelve teams; ten based in Australia with two in New Zealand. Seasons run from October to May and include a 26-round regular season followed by a finals series playoff involving the six highest-placed teams, culminating in a grand final match. Winners of the regular season are dubbed the 'Premier' while the winner of the grand final is the season's Champion; differing from other football codes in Australia, where premier refers to the grand final winner and the winner of the regular season is the 'minor premier'.

Most successful clubs for the season are granted qualification into the Asian continental club competitions, the AFC Champions League Elite and the AFC Champions League Two. In 2014, the Western Sydney Wanderers became the first and only winning Australian club of the AFC Champions League. Like the United States' MLS, as well as other professional sports leagues in Australia, it does not practice relegation and promotion and furthermore institutes a salary cap. The men's, women's and youth are also brought together under the unified A-Leagues banner.

== History ==
=== Background ===
A national round-robin tournament existed in various forms prior to the formation of the A-League, with the most notable being the National Soccer League (NSL). The formation of the NSL came after Australia's qualification for the 1974 FIFA World Cup, which led to discussion of a national league, with 14 teams eventually chosen to participate in the inaugural season of the NSL in 1977.

Under the guidance of the then-governing body, the Australian Soccer Federation (later Soccer Australia), the NSL flourished through the 1980s and early 1990s but then fell into decline with the increasing departure of Australian players to overseas leagues, a disastrous television deal with the Seven Network and the resulting lack of sponsorship. Few clubs continued to grow with Sydney Olympic, Perth Glory, and the newly established Adelaide United the exception in a dying league.

In April 2003, the Australian Federal Government initiated the Independent Soccer Review Committee to investigate the governance and management of the sport in Australia, including that of the NSL. In December 2003, a Crawford Report found that the NSL was financially unviable, and in response the chairman of the sport's new governing body, Frank Lowy of the Football Federation Australia, announced a task force would be formed to create a new national competition a successor to the NSL which had dissolved at the conclusion of the 2003–04 season after 27 years of operation.

=== Foundations ===
The A-League was announced in April 2004, succeeding the NSL. Eight teams would be part of the new national competition, with one team from each city of Sydney, Melbourne, Brisbane, Adelaide, Perth, Newcastle, plus a New Zealand team and one from a remaining expressions of interest from either Melbourne or Sydney. The competition start date was set for August 2005.

By June, 20 submissions had been received and a month later 12 consortiums sent in their final bids for the eight spots. Three bids were received from Melbourne, two each from Sydney and Brisbane, one from each of the remaining preferred cities and a bid from the New South Wales Central Coast city of Gosford. Over the next three months, each bid was reviewed and on 1 November 2004, the eight successful bidders and the major sponsor were revealed, for what would be known as the 'Hyundai A-League', with the Hyundai Motor Company unveiled as the official naming rights sponsor for the league.

The eight founding teams were Adelaide United, the Central Coast Mariners, the Melbourne Victory, the Newcastle Jets, the New Zealand Knights, Perth Glory, the Queensland Roar, and Sydney FC. Along with four former NSL clubs taking part; Adelaide United, the Newcastle Jets, and Perth Glory, as well as the Queensland Lions who withdrew their first team from the Queensland State League and entered as the Queensland Roar plus the New Zealand Knights who were formed from the New Zealand Football Kingz. Club were given a five-year exclusivity deal in their own market as part of a "one-city, one-team" policy strategy; intended to allow clubs to grow and develop an identity in their respective region without local competition.

=== Initial seasons ===
On 26 August 2005, 16 months after the demise of the NSL, the inaugural season of the A-League began. The first season saw Adelaide United win the premier's plate by seven points over Sydney FC. Sydney FC became the inaugural Champions after they defeated Central Coast by a Steve Corica goal to claim the first title on 5 March 2006.

The following season saw Melbourne Victory claim the A-League premiers plate when they smashed Adelaide United 6–0 in the final at the Telstra Dome with Archie Thompson scoring five goals in the rout. But the season wasn't without a change with the New Zealand Knights being replaced by the Wellington Phoenix after the Knights were taken over by New Zealand Football after the team only won six times in forty-two games and selected overseas talent instead of local.

=== Development and reforms ===
Both Gold Coast United and the North Queensland Fury joined the league in the 2009–10 season. On 12 June 2009, Melbourne Heart was awarded a licence to join the 2010–11 season. On 1 March 2011 North Queensland Fury's A-League licence was revoked for financial reasons. On 29 February 2012, Gold Coast United also had its licence revoked. On 4 April 2012, it was announced that a new Western Sydney-based club, Western Sydney Wanderers, would join the league for the 2012–13 season. In January 2014, Melbourne Heart was acquired by the City Football Group and was renamed Melbourne City ahead of the 2014–15 season. In February 2018, officials announced that the league would expand to 12 teams for the 2019–20 season. Later that year, the league announced that Western United FC would join the competition in 2019–20 and Macarthur would enter the following season (2020–21).

In the lead-up to the expansion announcements in 2019, club stakeholders entered into discussions with Football Federation Australia (FFA) to take over ownership of the competition. The league had been created and operated by the FFA since its inception in 2004, though by 2018 the FFA and clubs were at loggerheads over the permanent ownership structure of the league. A FIFA-backed congress review working group issued a sweeping 100-page report in August 2018, recommending an expanded domestic congress and an independent A-League, controlled and operated by the clubs.

On 1 July 2019, the FFA and Australian Professional Football Clubs Association (the body representing the A-League clubs) announced an agreement had been reached for the FFA to relinquish control of the league to the clubs by the following month, in time for the start of the 2019–20 season. The agreement brought the sport in line with the governance structure utilised in most European leagues. The new ownership body is called the Australian Professional Leagues, a consortium of the A-League clubs and their owners, with certain rights held by the FFA, and a capital investment & ownership stake held by American firm Silver Lake. A-League officials in May 2021 announced that the league will align to the Domestic Match Calendar to avoid clashing with FIFA Days, as well as introducing Domestic Transfer System and National Club Licensing frameworks.

The number of clubs reduced from 13 in the 2024–25 season to 12, following the removal of Western United by Football Australia for financial reasons.

== Competition format ==
=== Regular season ===
The regular season runs mainly during the Australian summer, from early October to April of the following year. As of the 2024–25 season, due to the introduction of Auckland FC and an odd number of teams, the competition consists of 29 rounds, with each team playing every other team two or three times, playing 26 games total. Each team will play 24 home and away fixtures, plus two additional third matches (one of which in Unite Round). Additionally, each team will have three byes. The teams allotted two home matches against an opponent in one season are allotted one home match against that opponent in the following season. Each match sees the winning team awarded three competition points, with one point each for a draw. The club at the top of this ladder is crowned A-League Premiers, and since the 2005–06 season has been entered into the AFC Champions League. The Premier is presented with a trophy known as the Premier's Plate.

At the completion of the regular season the top six placed teams on the league table progress to the finals series. The position of each team is determined by the highest number of points accumulated during the regular season. If two or more teams are level on points, the following criteria are applied in order until one of the teams can be determined as the higher ranked:

1. Highest goal difference;
2. Highest number of goals scored;
3. Most wins;
4. Highest number of points accumulated in matches between the teams concerned;
5. Highest goal difference in matches between the teams concerned;
6. Highest number of goals scored in matches between the teams concerned;
7. Lowest number of red cards accumulated;
8. Lowest number of yellow cards accumulated;
9. Toss of a coin.

==== Unite Round ====
For the 2023–24 and 2024–25 season, the Australian Professional Leagues announced "Unite Round". During this round, all matches were held in Sydney, in Allianz Stadium and CommBank Stadium, with some women's matches being held at Leichhardt Oval, across the second weekend of January. The round is part of a partnership with Destination NSW, and was introduced after the Grand Final decision was reversed in October 2023, one year into its original 3-year stretch after severe fan backlash.

Season	Dates	City	Venues (matches)	Attendance		
Season	Dates	City	Venues (matches)	Men	Women	Total
2023–24	12–14 January 2024	Sydney	Allianz Stadium (4), CommBank Stadium (4), Leichhardt Oval (4)	36,203	11,222	47,425
2024–25	22–24 November 2024	Sydney	Allianz Stadium (6), Netstrata Jubilee Stadium (6)	61,911	9,394	71,305

==== Pride Round ====
After Adelaide United player Josh Cavallo became the first openly gay top-flight male footballer in October 2021, the A-League partnered with A-League Women to stage a single Pride men's and women's doubleheader during the 2021–22 season.

On 24–26 February 2023, both the A-League Men and Women's competitions staged their first-ever Pride Round, the first occasion in which the leagues had "come together to recognise and promote inclusion for the LGBTQIA+ community". Part proceeds from ticket sales across all of the round's fixtures were donated to Pride Cup. In 2024, the Australian Professional Leagues (APL) announced the continuation of the round, as well as providing inclusion training to all players and key stakeholders. The A-Leagues would be collaborating with the PFA and Pride Cup, who would help to deliver the training. The annual Pride Cup double-header between Adelaide United and Melbourne Victory would take place in March, and several men's and women's teams would celebrate by engaging community groups and using indicators such as rainbow corner flags, armbands, special Pride kit and/or rainbow socks.

=== Finals series ===
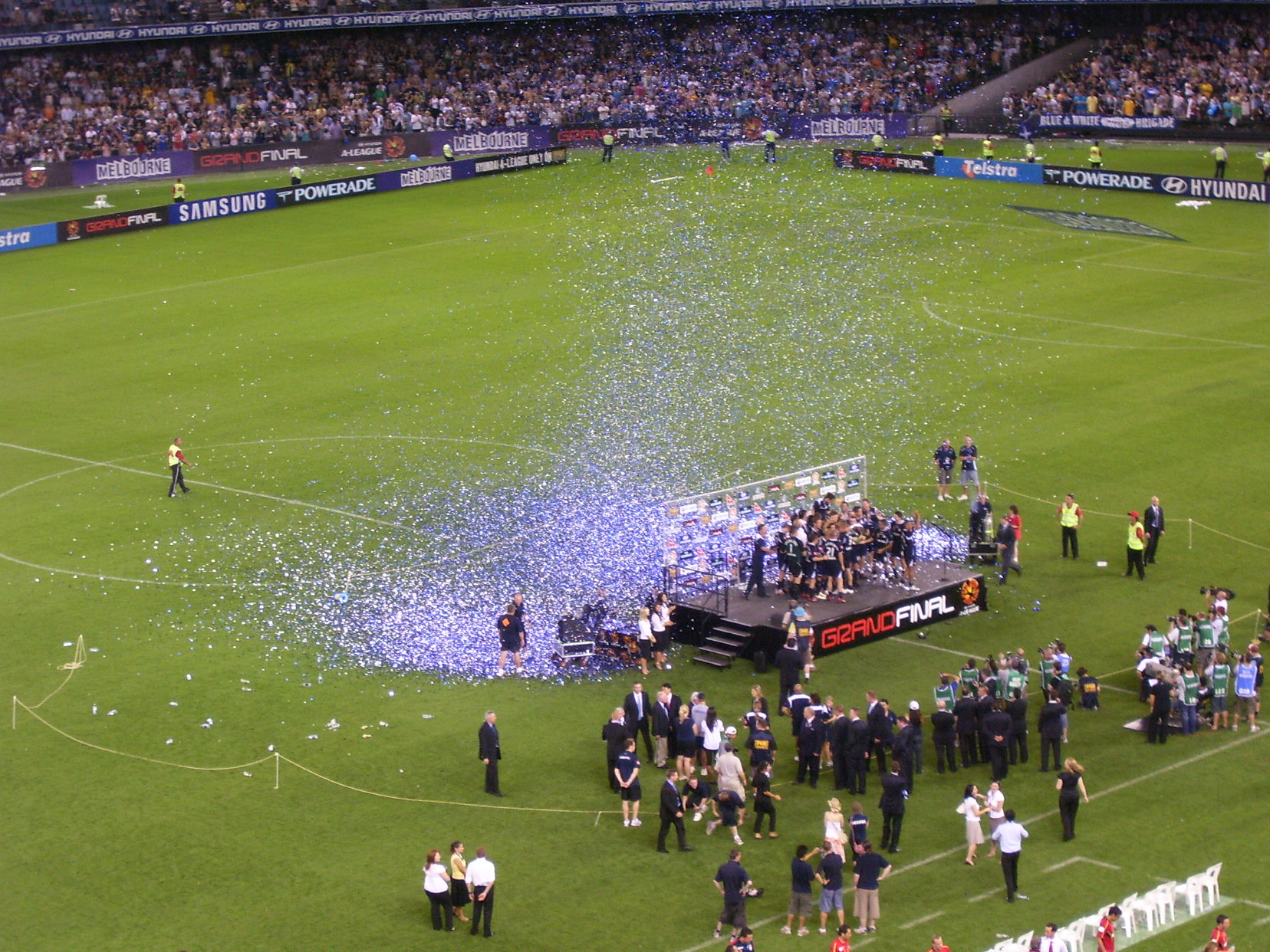
Melbourne Victory celebrating after their 2007 A-League Grand Final victory.

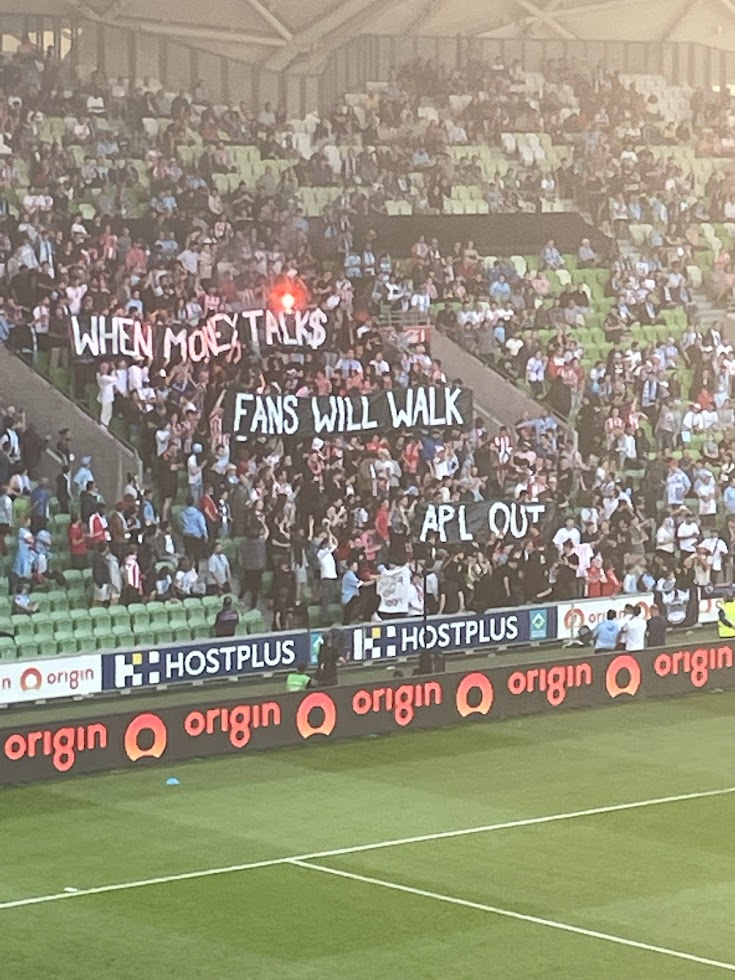
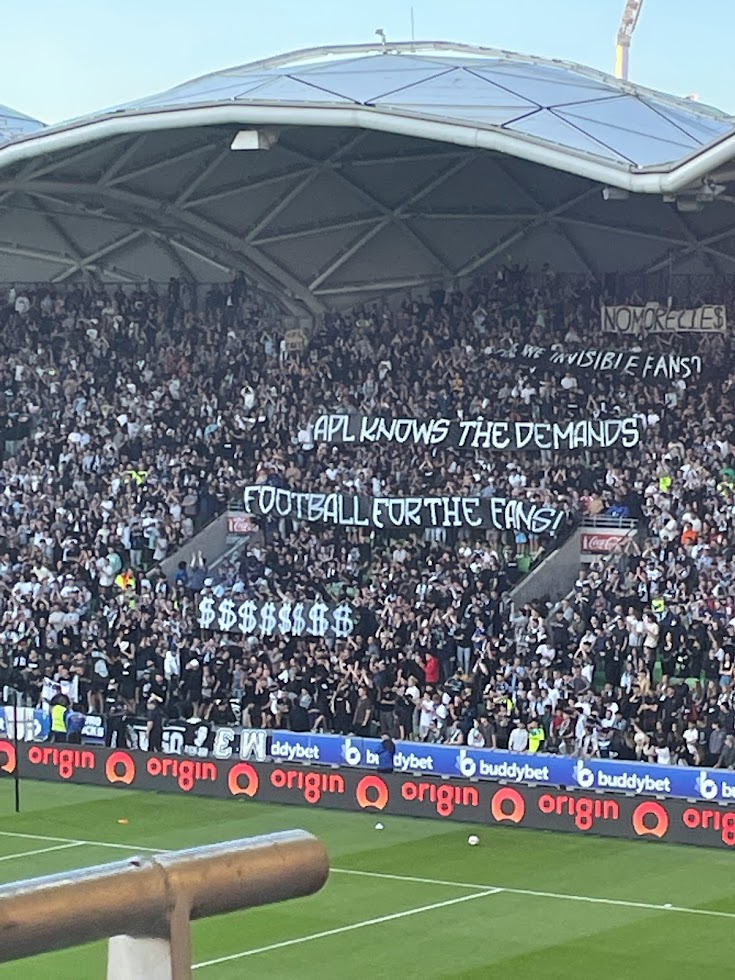
City Terrace and Original Style Melbourne, the active supporter groups of Melbourne City FC and Melbourne Victory FC at the time respectively, protesting the decision by Australian Professional Leagues to give A-Leagues Grand Final hosting rights to Sydney for the next three seasons in the 20th minute of the Melbourne Derby on 17 December 2022.

The top six clubs at the conclusion of the regular season progress to the finals series. The finals series culminates to the A-League grand final, where the winner is crowned A-League champion. The club that wins the grand final is presented with the A-League Champions Trophy.

The finals series consists of six teams who are placed by rank, as determined at the end of the regular season. The finals series runs over four weeks. In the first week of fixtures, the third-through-sixth ranked teams play a single-elimination match, with the two winners of those matches joining the first and second ranked teams in two-legged ties played over two weeks. The two winners of those matches meet in the grand final. This method was initially adopted for the 2021–22 season.

Up until 2022, between the two grand finalists, the team that finished higher on the ladder at the conclusion of the regular season hosted the grand final. The only exception to this was if the FA deemed that team's home ground to be an inappropriate venue. For example, in 2008, Central Coast Mariners (as the higher-placed team) hosted the grand final against the Newcastle Jets at Sydney Football Stadium, due to FFA deciding that Central Coast Mariners' home stadium, Central Coast Stadium with a capacity of 20,000, was too small for the event.

On 12 December 2022, the Australian Professional Leagues (APL) announced that the grand finals for the 2022–23, 2023–24 and 2024–25 seasons would be hosted in Sydney, a decision which received considerable backlash. On 18 October 2023, the APL announced that the Grand Final hosting rights would revert to the original format, and instead a new "Unite Round" was introduced, with a regular season round having all its games played in Sydney.

Grand final host stadium

Stadium	Location	No. hosted	Years hosted
Sydney Football Stadium	Sydney	4	2006, 2008, 2013, 2017
Melbourne Rectangular Stadium	Melbourne	4	2015, 2021, 2022, 2025
Docklands Stadium	Melbourne	3	2007, 2009, 2010
Lang Park	Brisbane	3	2011, 2012, 2014
Western Sydney Stadium	Sydney	2	2020, 2023
Adelaide Oval	Adelaide	1	2016
Newcastle International Sports Centre	Newcastle	1	2018
Perth Stadium	Perth	1	2019
Central Coast Stadium	Gosford	1	2024
Go Media Stadium	Auckland	1	2026

=== Continental qualification ===
==== AFC Champions League Elite ====
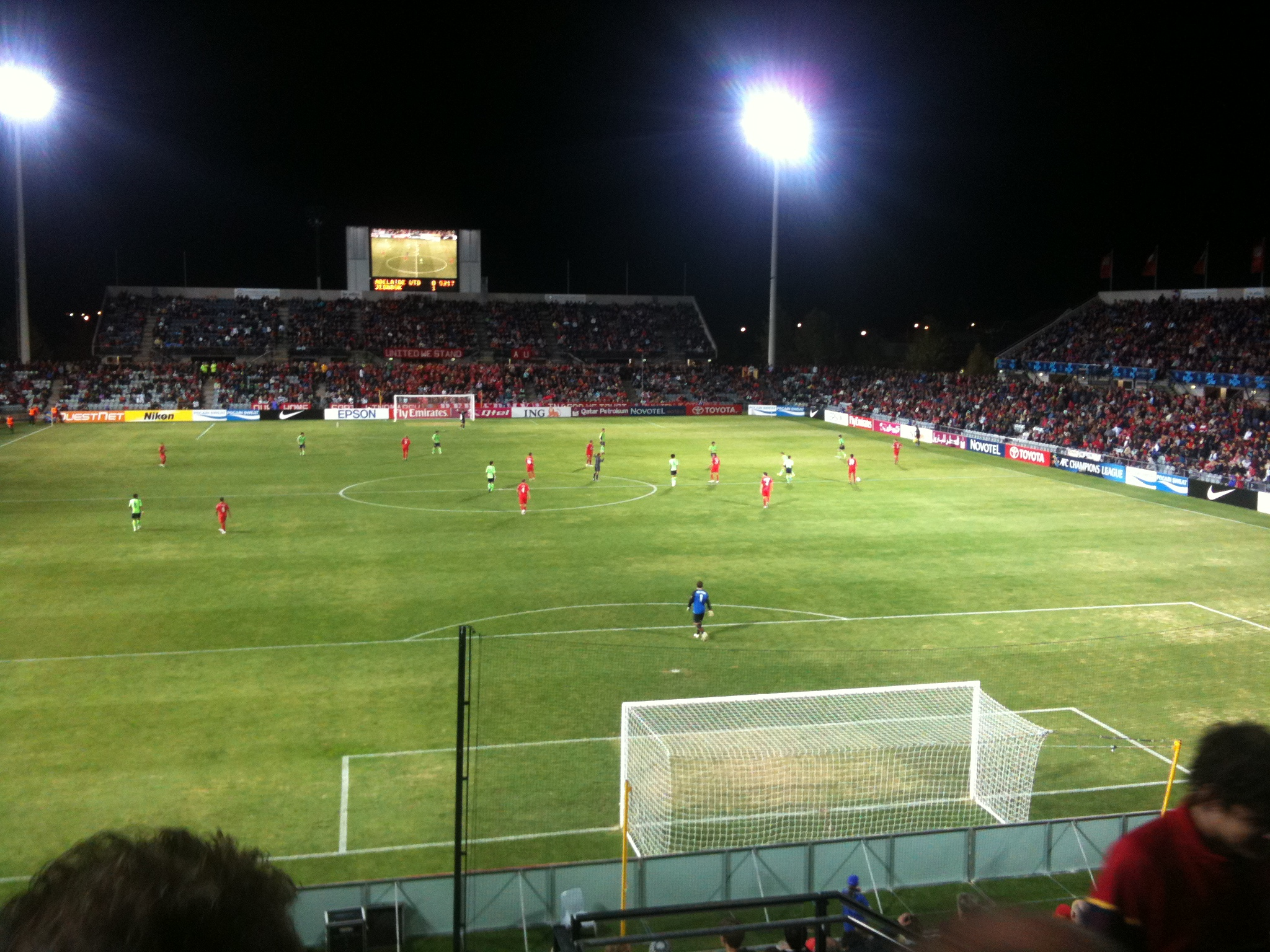
Adelaide United against Jeonbuk Hyundai Motors in the AFC Champions League in 2010.

Australian A-League clubs are eligible for participation in the AFC Champions League competition each season since the 2007 edition of the tournament. Wellington Phoenix and Auckland FC are not eligible to compete in the Asian Champions League, nor do they compete in the OFC Champions League. Qualification is determined by league finishing positions and the winner of the Australia Cup Final, with the number of positions determined by the Asian Football Confederation club competition ranking. Due to the re-formatting of the AFC Champions League to have an inter-year schedule from September (northern hemisphere autumn-to-spring) instead of an intra-year schedule (northern hemisphere spring-to-autumn), the qualification format for the 2023–24 AFC Champions League was changed, with a single qualification spot going to whichever of which of the Premiers for the 2021–22 or the 2022–23 seasons accrues the most combined points over both seasons.

The only Australian side to win the Asian Champions League is Western Sydney Wanderers in 2014. Adelaide United is the only other club to reach the final, and finished runner-up in 2008.

==== AFC Champions League Two ====
Australian clubs also participated in the AFC Cup for the first time in the 2023–24 season, with allocated slots based on the AFC Club Competitions Ranking which was published on 24 November 2021. Central Coast Mariners won this edition in their first ever participation.

=== Other competitions ===
In 2004–05, Australia was still a part of the Oceania Football Confederation and Sydney FC won the right to compete in the Oceania Club Championship after defeating the Central Coast Mariners in a qualifying tournament.

Since 2014 clubs compete in the annual Australia Cup knock-out tournament (previously known as the FFA Cup). Since 2021, the top eight teams qualify for the competition's Round of 32, while the bottom four teams play-off against each other for the final two slots.

Between 2005 and 2008 clubs participated in the A-League Pre-Season Challenge Cup prior to each A-League regular season. In 2013 and 2014 an A-League All Stars Game was also played as a pre-season friendly game between the league's finest players and a high-profile international team.

Most A-League Men clubs have teams in the A-League Youth competition, which runs in conjunction with the A-League Men as a national youth developmental and reserve league. All players in the youth teams are between the ages of 16 and 21 as of the start of the calendar year for each new season, while four over-age players from each of the senior teams also allowed to be selected. In addition, the A-League Women operates as the top division of women's league with affiliations to the men's competition. However, the A-League Youth has not been resumed since the COVID-19 pandemic.

In response to the debate about the development of a new professional second division, the Australian Championship has been proposed to support the A-League, with the aim to avoid the American franchise-based system and to put in line with European football leagues.

== Clubs ==
The league is currently contested by 12 teams: ten from Australia and two from New Zealand. A total of 16 teams have competed at some stage in the league's short history. Only four of these clubs – Adelaide United, the Brisbane Roar (as the Queensland Lions), the Newcastle Jets, and the Perth Glory – existed before the A-League was formed in 2004. Gold Coast United, the New Zealand Knights, the North Queensland Fury, and Western United have formerly competed in the league.

Unlike most leagues from across the world, there is no system for relegation and promotion of teams. The A-Leagues system thus shares some franchising elements with most other professional leagues in Australia, Major League Soccer, Canadian Premier League, and other major Northern American-based sports leagues.

Current clubs
Team	City	State	Stadium	Capacity	Founded	Joined	Head coach	Team captain
Adelaide United	Adelaide	South Australia	Coopers Stadium	16,500	2003	2005	(Brazil) Airton Andrioli	(Australia) Craig Goodwin
Auckland FC	Auckland	Auckland	Go Media Stadium	25,000	2024	2024	(Portugal) Pedro Moreira	(Japan) Hiroki Sakai
Brisbane Roar	Brisbane	Queensland	Suncorp Stadium	52,500	1957	2005	(Australia) Michael Valkanis	(Scotland) Tom Aldred
Central Coast Mariners	Gosford	New South Wales	Polytec Stadium	20,059	2004	2005	(Malta) John Hutchinson	(Australia) Trent Sainsbury
Macarthur FC	Campbelltown	New South Wales	Campbelltown Sports Stadium	17,500	2017	2020	(Australia) Sasa Ognenovski	(Australia) Liam Rose
Melbourne City	Melbourne	Victoria	AAMI Park	30,050	2009	2010	(Australia) Aurelio Vidmar	(Australia) Aziz Behich
Melbourne Victory	Melbourne	Victoria	AAMI Park	30,050	2004	2005	(Venezuela) Giovanni Savarese	(Australia) Jason Davidson
Newcastle Jets	Newcastle	New South Wales	McDonald Jones Stadium	30,000	2000	2005	(Australia) Mark Milligan	(Australia) Max Burgess
Perth Glory	Perth	Western Australia	HBF Park	20,500	1995	2005	(Australia) Adam Griffiths	(Wales) Tom Lawrence
Sydney FC	Sydney	New South Wales	Allianz Stadium	42,500	2004	2005	(Australia) Patrick Kisnorbo	(Australia) Rhyan Grant
Wellington Phoenix	Wellington	Wellington	Hnry Stadium	34,500	2007	2007	(England) Chris Greenacre	(New Zealand) Alex Rufer
Western Sydney Wanderers	Sydney	New South Wales	CommBank Stadium	30,000	2012	2012	(Australia) Ufuk Talay	(Australia) Brandon Borrello

Future clubs
Team	City	State	Stadium	Capacity	Founded	Joining
Canberra United	Canberra	Australian Capital Territory	GIO Stadium	25,011	2026	2028

Former clubs
Team	City	State	Stadium	Capacity	Founded	Joined	Exited
Gold Coast United	Gold Coast	Queensland	Skilled Park	27,690	2008	2009	2012
New Zealand Knights	Auckland	Auckland	North Harbour Stadium	22,000	1998	2005	2007
North Queensland Fury	Townsville	Queensland	Dairy Farmers Stadium	26,500	2008	2009	2011
Western United	Wyndham	Victoria	Ironbark Fields	5,000	2017	2019	2026 (Note: Western United has its licence suspended in 2025.)

=== Timeline ===
League member Former member Future member

=== Expansion ===
While making a relatively modest start to ensure future stability, both the FFA and the soccer media indicated significant interest in expanding the league. The eight foundation clubs had exclusivity clauses for their respective cities valid for five years, but this did not exclude teams from other areas joining the league.

Before the introduction of the A-League, FFA chairman Frank Lowy speculated that he hoped to expand the league into other cities, mentioning Canberra, Hobart, Wollongong, Geelong, Bendigo, Cairns, Ballarat, Albury–Wodonga, Launceston, Christchurch, Auckland, Sunshine Coast and possibly Darwin and later Singapore.

In February 2018, officials announced that the league would expand to 12 teams for the 2019–20 season. In December 2018, the FFA announced they accepted the bids of Western United who joined the league in the 2019–20 season and of Macarthur FC, who joined the league in the 2020–21 season.

In 2021, further steps were taken in an attempt to expand from the recent 12 clubs, with goals being set to get 14 clubs in 2022–23 and a potential 16 clubs in 2023–24. Neither of these goals were met.

In March 2023, the Australian Professional Leagues confirmed plans for the next two expansion clubs to be based in Canberra and Auckland, ahead of the 2024–25 season.

In October 2023, the preferred bidder as owner of the new Auckland licence was confirmed to be Bill Foley. The licence was officially awarded to Foley on 21 November 2023. Auckland FC will join the league in the 2024–25 season.

On 13 June 2024, the APL confirmed that the new Canberra men's team would not begin in the 2024–25 season.

On 13 February 2025, it was reported that Canberra's entrance would be delayed another season.

On 17 July 2026, the APL announced that Canberra United have established new owners, forging a pathway for the men's team to join from the 2028–29 season.

=== Rivalries ===
There are several key rivalries and local derbies that have formed in the A-League, including:

"Melbourne Derby" – Melbourne City v Melbourne Victory
The two Melbourne clubs first met on 8 October 2010 in a lively game at AAMI Park in front of 25,897 fans. Melbourne City (known at the time as Melbourne Heart) came out on top with a 2–1 victory. A significant narrative in derby history is the role of Melbourne Victory as a more successful club both on and off the field, having joined the A-League five years earlier than City. The rivalry is one of the most intense and well respected in the A-League, producing noticeable atmosphere and some of the largest attendances in the league.

"The Original Rivalry" – Adelaide United v Melbourne Victory
The rivalry stems from the traditional cross-border rivalry between sporting teams from South Australia and Victoria but was strengthened by multiple incidents in the 2006–07 season, such as the confrontation between Melbourne Victory captain Kevin Muscat and Adelaide United coach John Kosmina. The two clubs contested the 2007 and 2009 A-League Grand Finals, with Melbourne winning the 2009 Grand Final 1–0 against a 10-man Adelaide United side. The two clubs were also involved in the first and only occasion in the A-League during the 2008–09 A-League season, where they both finished on the top of the ladder equal on both points and goal difference.

"Sydney Derby" – Sydney FC v Western Sydney Wanderers
The derby was contested for the first time in the 2012–13 season with the introduction of the second Sydney-based club, Western Sydney Wanderers, into the league. Sydney FC grabbed bragging rights by winning the first derby 1–0 at Parramatta Stadium, however Western Sydney Wanderers won the return match at Allianz Stadium 2–0. A Sydney Derby held early in the 2015 season broke the Allianz Stadium record for attendance during a regular season in any football code, dating back to the stadium's opening in 1988. A match in 2016 between the two teams broke the record A-League crowd with 61,880 fans attending the match at ANZ Stadium. Sydney Derby is intensified by the geographic distinction between the two clubs within Sydney, as well as historical grievances related to the foundation of Sydney FC.

"The Big Blue" – Melbourne Victory v Sydney FC
This match is so named because blue is the main colour of both teams' playing kits, and is also Australian slang for a fight or a contest. The rivalry has emerged as a result of a number of spiteful encounters between the teams in recent years, and due to the longstanding rivalry between Sydney and Melbourne, Australia's two largest cities. The teams have competed against each other in three grand finals; in 2010 & 2017, with Sydney winning 4–2 on penalties after a 1–1 draw on both occasions and in 2015, with Victory winning 3–0. In 2010, Sydney FC won the A-League Premiership on the final day of the season by defeating Victory 2–0. A Big Blue match is traditionally played on Australia Day each year.

"The F3 Derby" – Central Coast Mariners v Newcastle Jets
Named after the former name of the freeway that connects the cities of Newcastle and Gosford, this match features the only two clubs in the A-League that are not based in state or national capital cities. The two teams' stadiums are just one hour apart, and the derby was intensified when they competed against each other for the premiership in the 2007–08 A-League season and eventually met in the Grand Final, which was won 1–0 by the Jets. Since 2022, the teams have competed for a trophy made out of a core drill sample of the motorway.

"The Battle of the West" – Macarthur FC v Western Sydney Wanderers FC
First contested after Macarthur FC's introduction to the A-League in 2020–21, the rivalry between Macarthur FC and Western Sydney Wanderers stems from the geographical locations of both clubs within Western Sydney, with Macarthur FC representing South Western Sydney, with its home ground, Campbelltown Sports Stadium, in Campbelltown, and its temporary training ground, Fairfield Showground, located in Prairiewood, with the Western Sydney Wanderers representing Greater Western Sydney, with their home ground at Western Sydney Stadium in Parramatta and their training ground at Blacktown Football Park in Rooty Hill. The first match of this rivalry occurred on 30 December 2020, with Macarthur prevailing 1-0 in front of a crowd of 10,128 at Western Sydney Stadium. The rivalry was originally skewed in favour of Macarthur FC, with Macarthur unbeaten across the first five matches, however, it has become more competitive in recent years, with Western Sydney Wanderers having won 7 of the most recent 12 meetings as of July 2026.

"New Zealand Derby" / "Mai te Raki ki te Tonga" – Auckland FC v Wellington Phoenix
With the introduction of expansion club Auckland FC for the 2024–25 season, Wellington will have an opponent from the same country for the first time. The first ever edition of this derby is scheduled for 2 November 2024 at Wellington Regional Stadium, and they will meet a further two times during the season. On 9 August 2024, Auckland announced the signing of former Wellington goalkeeper Alex Paulsen, on loan from AFC Bournemouth which was thought to be in contravention of the "Caceres rule" which the APL had only announced that morning would be reviewed. Following this announcement, Wellington raised concerns with Football Australia "seeking further information" about the loan move. Shortly before the start of the 2024–25 season, the League announced the official name of the derby would be "Kiwi Clasico", however, official channels stopped using that name once the season began. On the day of the first ever match between the two clubs, Te Āti Awa and Ngāti Whātua presented a special taonga to be awarded to the winner, and dubbed the derby "Mai te Raki ki te Tonga", which translates to 'From the North to the South' from the Māori language.

== Organisation ==
=== Logo and branding ===
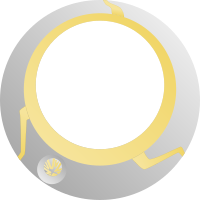
The A-League Trophy was designed to resemble a laurel wreath. (Image features A-League logo from 2004 to 2017)

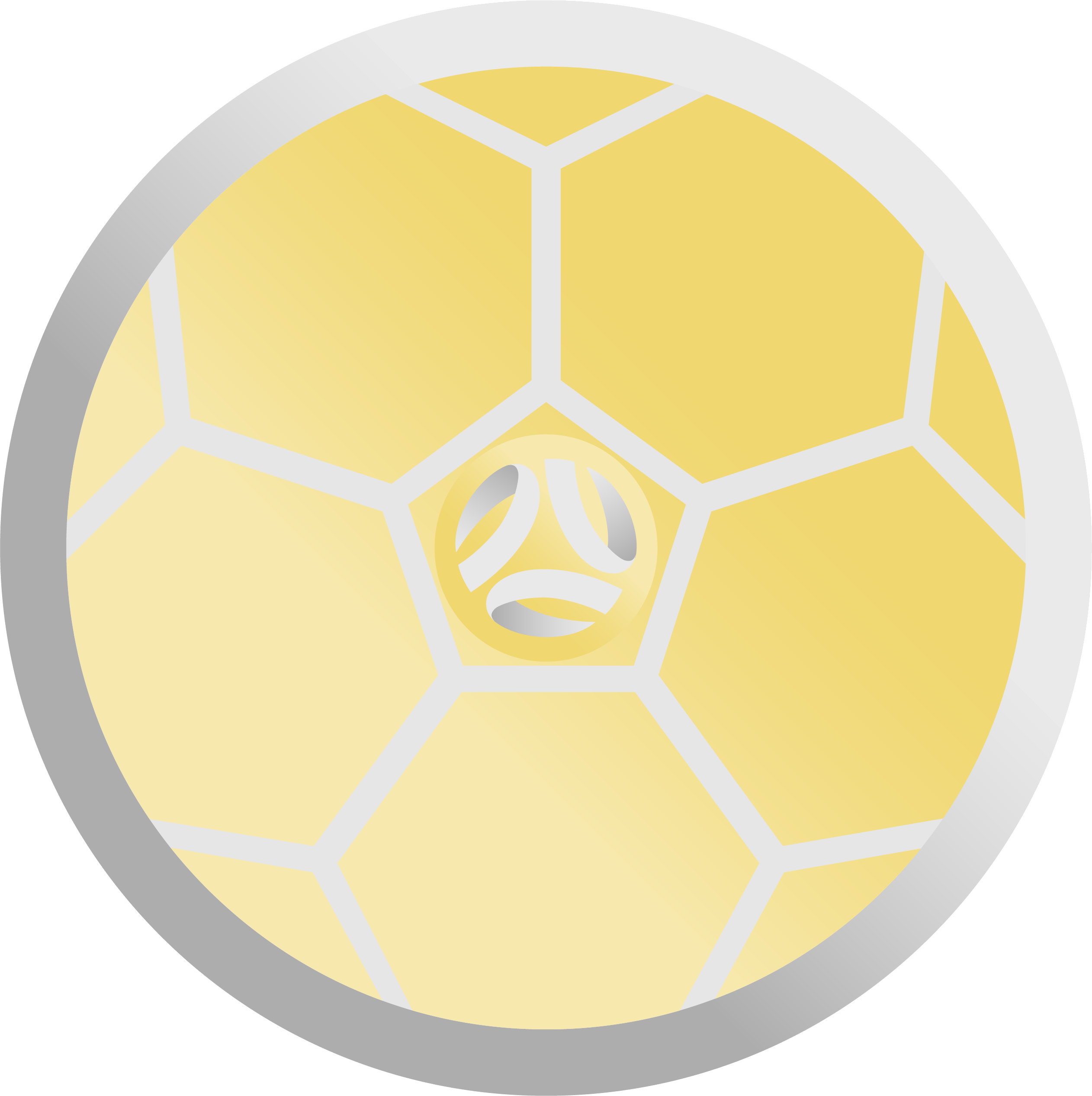
The Premier's Plate is awarded to the highest finishing team in the regular season. (Image features A-League logo from 2017 to 2021)

The current A-League logo was unveiled in September 2021, as part of a re-branding of both the A-League and W-League, bringing them under the same umbrella of "A-Leagues" by the Australian Professional Leagues. The logo was designed by R/GA, a creative agency in Sydney, and led to a major controversy but narrowly avoided legal trouble with building company in Adelaide over design similarities. Isuzu UTE became the naming rights sponsor of the A-League Men in October 2021, and therefore features on all branding. This partnership was extended a further two years in December 2023.

In January 2017, Football Federation Australia unveiled their new A-League logo which formed part of a wider rebranding branding of the A-League and its subsidiary competitions, the W-League and Youth League. The logo design was "inspired by soccer's three outstanding features – atmosphere, diversity and unity" and has colour alterations tailored to each of the 12 A-League clubs. The changes came into effect before the 2017/18 season. The original A-League logo was designed by Coast Design Sydney. It was the inaugural logo of the league. The two-toned ochre colours represented the sun, earth and desert while the 'glow' emanating from the centre of the logo depicted the playing season's spring and summer time span. The eight 'A' figures that made up the ball shape represented the eight foundation clubs of the league.

=== Trophy and Plate ===
The A-League has two trophies which are competed for during the season: the Premier's Plate and the A-League Trophy. The Premier's Plate is awarded to the A-League Premiers, the regular season winners, and the A-League Trophy is awarded to the A-League Champions, the winner of the Grand Final. Both pieces of silverware were designed by Sydney design company D3 Design. The A-League Trophy is nicknamed the "Toilet Seat" due to its shape. Where as the Premier's Plate follows a traditional trophy design, the A-League Trophy differs. In 2005, John O'Neill, FFA CEO commented during the unveiling of the A-League Trophy, "We have a new national league and we feel it is important to re-define the conventional view of a trophy to reflect this". Clive Solari of D3 Design explained the trophy's design, saying "We wanted our trophy concept to embody the historical significance of sport in a contemporary design. So we looked to history to see how great achievements have been rewarded across all types of games for thousands of years. The winners of the world's original sporting competition, the Olympic Games, were presented with a laurel wreath on their heads. We used this model as a basis for a unique, cutting-edge design – our trophy is a modern and versatile translation of the wreath. The winners can hold it above their heads as a symbol of success".

=== Squad formation and salary cap ===
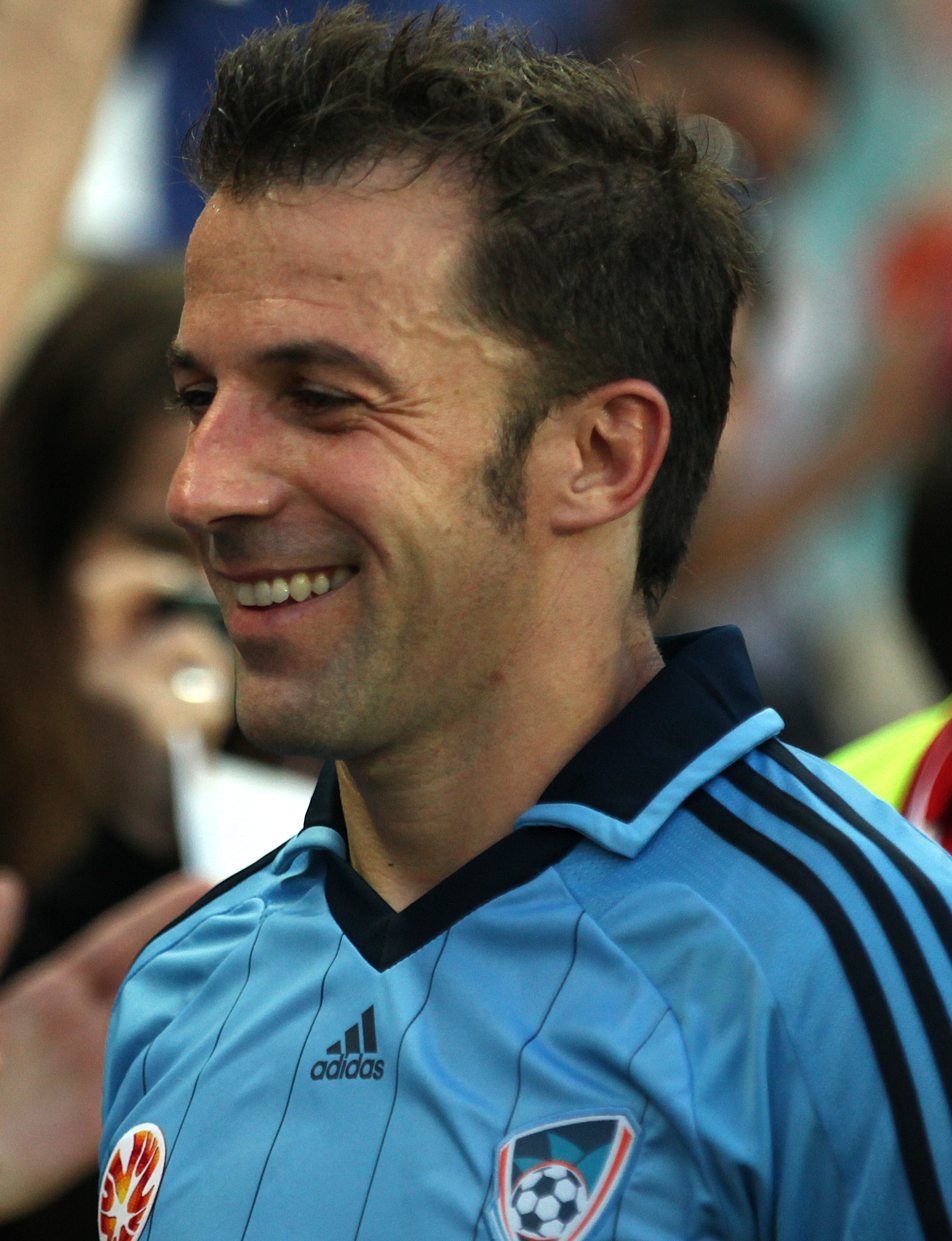
Alessandro Del Piero joined the league in 2012, as Sydney FC's marquee player.

For the 2025–26 A-League Men season, an A-League squad:

1. must include a minimum of 18 players;
2. must not exceed the maximum of 23 players;
3. must include a minimum of 2 goalkeepers;
4. may include an unlimited number of youth players;
5. may include a maximum of 4 homegrown players at any one time, defined as Australian players aged under 23 that have come through the club’s youth system who are fully exempt from the salary cap;
6. may include a maximum of 2 marquee players at any one time, who are fully exempt from the salary cap;
7. may include a maximum of 2 designated players at any one time, who are exempt from the salary cap but must earn a salary between $300,000 and $600,000;
8. may include an unlimited number of loyalty players, defined as players who have played 10 or more consecutive seasons at the club; and
9. may include a maximum of 5 foreign players at any one time, whereby: a maximum of 2 Foreign Players at any one time may be under the age of 20 on or before 31 December 2025; and in relation to the New Zealand clubs only, such foreign players must be players other than Australian players or New Zealand players.
10. Clubs may also have one guest player who sits outside the A-League roster, who is fully exempt from the salary cap and is only eligible for circa half the season but who must meet strict eligibility requirements.

The A-League match-day squad includes the typical 11 players, and five substitutes of which one must be a goalkeeper. Prior to the 2013–14 season, just four substitutes including one goalkeeper were allowed to be named in the starting line-ups for the teams.

An squad must comprise a minimum of 20 players with a maximum of 26, subject to several limitations. Within the squad, there can be a maximum of five "foreign" or "Visa" players, from outside Australia (and New Zealand, in the case of clubs based there), that hold a temporary working-visa. Three players in the squad must also be under 20 years of age. In addition to these three under 20 players, clubs are allowed to sign an additional three youth players onto full-time contracts at a lower pay rate than the rest of the squad. The A-League had initially proposed that the quota of five visa players per A-League club be reduced to four in the 2015–16 season, with the limit of four possibly become "3+1", which means three imports from anywhere and one from Asia (following regulations in the AFC Champions League). However, after opposition to the proposal by both players and managers, the move was placed on hold.

Although A-League clubs have restricted salaries (salary cap), the league since its inception allowed clubs to have two "marquee" players whose salaries are exempt from the cap, plus a number of other 'exemptions' or 'allowances' to incentivise clubs to spend in specific areas. Guest players are also excluded for up to a maximum of 14 league matches. From the 2008–09 season, A-League clubs have been permitted a junior marquee player; one that is under the age of 23. Now known as the 'Homegrown Player allowance', clubs can spend up to a collective $150,000 on three Australian players aged 23 or younger that have come through the club's youth system.

On 19 April 2010, the A-League announced that, in addition to the international marquee and junior marquee, clubs would be allowed an Australian marquee from the 2010–11 season. Notable marquee and guest players have included Alessandro Del Piero, William Gallas, Dwight Yorke, Keisuke Honda, Damien Duff, Emile Heskey, Robbie Fowler, Shinji Ono, David Villa and former FIFA World Player of the Year Romário. Famous Australian Marquees include Harry Kewell, John Aloisi, Brett Emerton, Joshua Kennedy and Tim Cahill. From the 2021–22 A-League Men season, the league added a designated player slot, whose salary is exempt from the cap, but must be $300,000–$600,000 per season. The following season, the league added a second designated player slot for each club.

Commencing in the 2015–16 season, players who have played at their club for 5–10 years will be covered by a "loyalty player allowance", allowing up to $200,000 of their salary to be exempted from the cap. Additionally, clubs are now permitted a mature-age rookie whose wages are outside the salary cap. The 2016–17 season saw the introduction of a third 'Full Season Guest Marquee' spot, designed to attract high-profile players on short-term deals.

The salary cap for A-League clubs is $2.1 million for the 2020–21 season, in the case for new clubs debuting, they were entitled to a $333,000 allowance thus increasing their salary cap to $2.433 million. Clubs must spend at least the salary floor which is $1.7 million. The salary cap applies to the 18 to 23 players that clubs have registered to their A-League player roster, the top 2 highest-paid players (Designated Players) don't count in the cap.

Players registered at a club for more than 4 consecutive years as a professional are considered as 'Loyalty Players' and have the following amounts exempt from a club's salary cap; Year 4 – 12.5%, Year 5 – 25%, and 5% increments after that up until a max of 50%. Teams can spend an unlimited amount on 4 U-23 Australian players who have come from the youth team, called 'Homegrown Players'. Teams can sign up to 9 U-20 players on minimum wage called 'Scholarship Players' who don't count in the squad unless they are one of the 3 U21's in the squad, any payments above the national minimum wage to these Players are included in the club's Salary Cap.

A-League salaries and marquees
Season	Marquee player	Australian marquee	Junior marquee	Designated player	Mature-aged rookie	Salary cap	Minimum salary
2005–06	1	No	No	No	No	$1,500,000	
2006–07	1	No	No	No	No	$1,600,000	
2007–08	1	No	No	No	No	$1,800,000	
2008–09	1	No	1	No	No	$1,900,000	
2009–10	1	No	1	No	No	$2,250,000	
2010–11	1	1	1	No	No	$2,350,000	
2011–12	1	1	1	No	No	$2,400,000	
2012–13	1	1	1	No	No	$2,468,000	$48,000
2013–14	1	1	1	No	No	$2,500,000	$50,000
2014–15	1	1	1	No	No	$2,550,000	$51,000
2015–16	2		1	No	1	$2,600,000	$55,000
2016–17	3		1	No	1	$2,650,000	$55,715
2017–18	2		1	No	1	$2,928,000	$61,287
2018–19	2		1	No	1	$3,063,000	$64,113
2019–20	2		1	No	No	$3,200,000	$47,792–$64,113
2020–21	2		1	No	No	$2,100,000	$45,000–$62,500
2021–22	2		1	1	No		
2022–23	2		1	2	No		

=== Stadiums ===
A-League games have been played in 33 stadiums since the inaugural season of the A-League in 2005.

=== Sponsorship ===
The A-League Men Logo was designed from 2021 to 2026

Since its formation, the A-League has been sponsored by an official naming rights partner. In 2004, the Hyundai Motor Company was announced as the sponsor for the first three seasons of the league, known for commercial purposes as the "Hyundai A-League". In 2008, Hyundai renewed its initial contract with FFA for another four seasons until 2012, and that contract was further extended by four seasons until 2016. This sponsorship deal was then further extended to the end of the 2019–20 A-League season.

On 6 October 2021, Isuzu UTE was announced as the naming rights partner of the A-League Men in a 3-year deal, with the league known as the Isuzu UTE A-League. This deal was extended for a further three years in 2023, and expired at the start of the 2026–27 season.

Period	Sponsor	Name
2005–06 to 2019–20	Hyundai	Hyundai A-League
2020–21	No title sponsor	A-League
2021–22 to 2025–26	Isuzu UTE	Isuzu UTE A-League Men
2026–27 to present	TBC	A-League Men

== League championships ==
As of the 2025–26 season, 16 different clubs have competed in the league, with nine having won the trophy, and 10 winning at least one premier's plate. Six clubs have won a Premiership-Championship double, a feat achieved 11 times in total.

The winner of the regular season tournament is dubbed the "Premier" while the winner of the grand final is the season's "Champion". This differs from other football codes in Australia, where "premier" refers to the winner of the grand final and the winner of the regular season is the "minor premier".

Team	Champions	Year(s) won	Premiers	Year(s) won	Total combined	Doubles	A-League seasons
Sydney FC	5	2006, 2010, 2017, 2019, 2020	4	2009–10, 2016–17, 2017–18, 2019–20	9	3 (2010, 2017, 2020)	20
Melbourne Victory	4	2007, 2009, 2015, 2018	3	2006–07, 2008–09, 2014–15	7	3 (2007, 2009, 2015)	20
Central Coast Mariners	3	2013, 2023, 2024	3	2007–08, 2011–12, 2023–24	6	1 (2024)	20
Brisbane Roar	3	2011, 2012, 2014	2	2010–11, 2013–14	5	2 (2011, 2014)	20
Melbourne City	2	2021, 2025	3	2020–21, 2021–22, 2022–23	5	1 (2021)	15
Adelaide United	1	2016	2	2005–06, 2015–16	3	1 (2016)	20
Newcastle Jets	1	2008	1	2025–26	2		20
Auckland FC	1	2026	1	2024–25	2		2
Western United	1	2022	0	–	1		6
Western Sydney Wanderers	0	–	1	2012–13	1		13
Perth Glory	0	–	1	2018–19	1		20
Macarthur FC	0	–	0	–	0		5
Wellington Phoenix	0	–	0	–	0		18

== Records ==
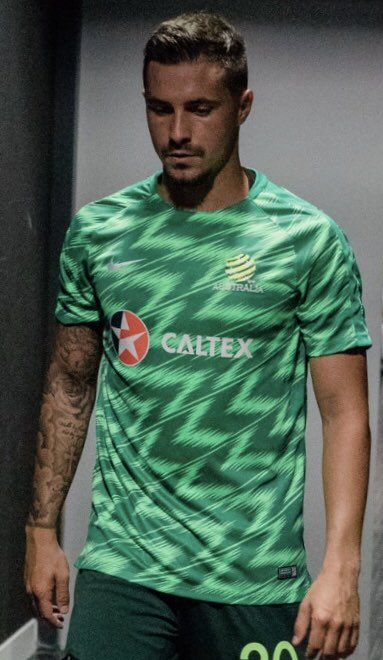
Jamie Maclaren is the leading A-League goalscorer, scoring 154 goals with three clubs.

Brisbane Roar hold the record for the longest unbeaten run in the competition with 36 league matches without defeat.

Jamie Maclaren holds the record for the greatest number of A-League goals, with 151 goals, playing for Perth Glory, Brisbane Roar, and Melbourne City. The A-League record for most goals in a single match is held by Archie Thompson, scoring 5 goals against Adelaide United on 18 February 2007, during the 2007 A-League Grand Final; and Jamie Maclaren who scored 5 goals against Melbourne Victory on 17 April 2021.

Jamie Maclaren has scored the most A-League hat-tricks with 8.

Shane Smeltz and Bobô are the only players to have scored hat-tricks in consecutive matches.

Henrique was the first, and so far only, player to score a hat-trick coming on as a substitute, for Brisbane Roar against Newcastle Jets.

In 2015, Austrian striker Marc Janko broke the record for scoring in consecutive matches when he scored in seven games for Sydney FC.

== Media coverage ==
=== In Australia ===
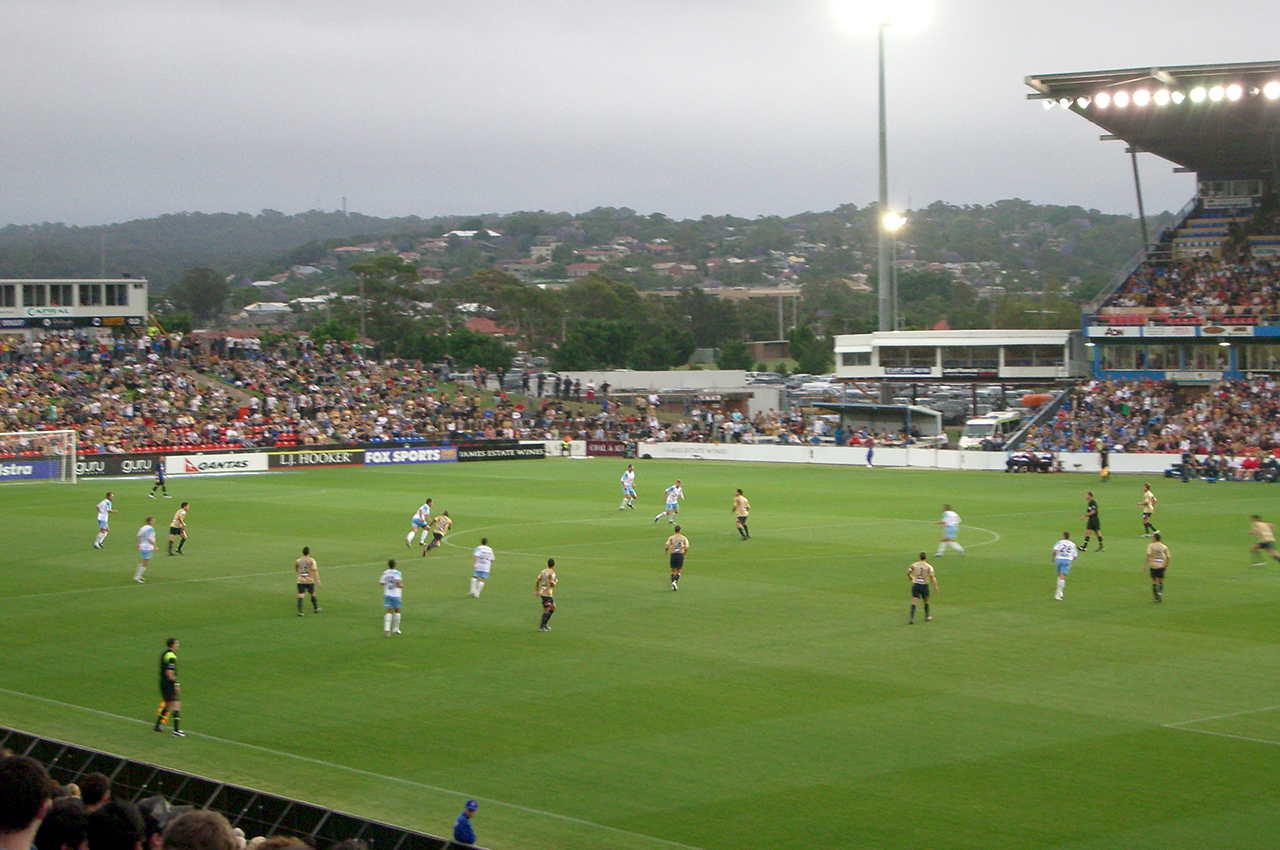
Newcastle Jets against Sydney FC at Newcastle Stadium in 2007.

From the start of the 2005–06 season to the 2012–13 season, television coverage of the A-League in Australia was restricted to the subscription-only Fox Sports channel, to which only 7% of Australian residents had access.

On 19 November 2012, free-to-air Australian public broadcasting television network Special Broadcasting Service (SBS) secured the shared rights, alongside long-time A-League broadcasters Fox Sports, to the A-League from the 2013–14 season with a A$160 million four-year broadcast deal.

SBS's coverage ended in the 2016–17 season, with Network Ten securing free-to-air broadcast rights. Ten simulcast the Fox Sports coverage of the Saturday night fixture on its digital multichannel One.

From the 2019–20 season, ABC TV has broadcast one game a weekend (Saturday 5pm) live on its primary channel. It also has the right to broadcast delayed coverage of some finals matches and the Grand Final. Fox Sport's contract with the A-League, which was renegotiated in June 2020 amidst the COVID-19 pandemic, concluded in July 2021.

Since August 2021, as part of a five-year deal with ViacomCBS, the A-Leagues are being broadcast by Network 10 and Paramount+ streaming service. Initially one A-League Men match per weekend was broadcast on Ten's main channel and all matches were streamed on Paramount. Paramount+ and 10 hold the A-League Men broadcasting rights through to the end of the 2025–26 season, with two A-League Men matches broadcast live and free on 10 Drama at 5.00pm and 7.35pm AEDT on Saturday every week.

In May 2026, the APL extended its broadcast deal with Network 10 and Paramount+. From the 2026–27 season, one match per week will be broadcast live on 10 Drama, with "marquee" matches to be on 10's primary channel.

=== Other countries ===
In New Zealand the league has been broadcast on Sky Sport since its inaugural season. In the 2019–20 season, the league also broadcast on Qatari beIN Sports after Sky ink four-year partnership for extensive soccer coverage, especially the A-league.

The growth of coverage of the A-League outside Australia saw the league broadcast in 65 countries around the world in 2013/14. Full match broadcasts are available in the United States, China, Italy, England, Ireland, Scotland, Wales, Canada, the Caribbean, Hong Kong, Singapore and Myanmar. In addition to the full match broadcasts, highlights of A-League matches can be viewed in 53 countries throughout Asia and the Middle East, including Japan and South Korea. In 2014, a three-season deal with Sony TEN allowed the league to be broadcast live in Asian nations including Afghanistan, Bangladesh, Bhutan, India, Maldives, Nepal, Pakistan and Sri Lanka. Every A-League match is also live streamed globally, allowing games to be viewed online through a subscription service provided in a partnership with the FFA. All games were also broadcast live in the United States on ESPN+ until 2021. Most games in the United Kingdom are broadcast by BT Sport but use Paramount+ live feed for every live game. For the 2014–15 Season, the A-League was broadcast in 173 countries.

=== Promotion ===
The A-League has been promoted using a number of different advertising slogans and strategies since its inception. At the start of the inaugural season, a A$3 million dollar advertising campaign was launched, with the television and film advertisements produced by Ridley Scott's production company Scott Free Productions. The theme for the campaign was: "Football, but not as you know it". A new television advertisement was created for the start of the 2007–08 season, which debuted on Foxtel's program Total Football. It was filmed at Bob Jane Stadium in Melbourne. Other campaigns include the "90 minutes, 90 emotions", which was used for two seasons from 2007 to 2009 and was accompanied by the music track "My People" from Australian act The Presets.

=== Current broadcasters ===
Broadcasters in Australia
Seasons	Pay	FTA
2005–13	Fox Sports	None
2013–17	Fox Sports	SBS
2017–19	Fox Sports	Network 10
2019–21	Fox Sports	ABC
2021–29	Paramount+	Network 10

Broadcasters as of the 2025–26 season are as follows:

Territory	Network
Australia	Network 10
Australia	Paramount+
New Zealand	Sky Open
New Zealand	Sky Sport
Pacific Islands	Australia TV
Pacific Islands	Pasifika TV
International	Sport24 (in-flight and ship only)
International	YouTube (unsold markets only)
Austria	Sportdigital
Germany	Sportdigital
Switzerland	Sportdigital
Afghanistan	Fancode
Bangladesh	Fancode
Bhutan	Fancode
India	Fancode
Maldives	Fancode
Nepal	Fancode
Pakistan	Fancode
Sri Lanka	Fancode
Brunei	SPOTV
Cambodia	SPOTV
Indonesia	SPOTV
Japan	SPOTV
Laos	SPOTV
Malaysia	SPOTV
Mongolia	SPOTV
Myanmar	SPOTV
Philippines	SPOTV
Singapore	SPOTV
South Korea	SPOTV
Taiwan	SPOTV
Thailand	SPOTV
Vietnam	SPOTV
Brazil	Canal Gol
China	Leisu Sports
Canada	OneFootball
Hong Kong	MyTV Super
Hong Kong	TVB
Ireland	TNT Sports
United Kingdom	TNT Sports
Liechtenstein	Blue Sport
Macau	Macau Cable
MENA	Dubai Sports
Russia	Match TV
Sub-Saharan Africa	Azam Sports
Sub-Saharan Africa	Canal+
Sub-Saharan Africa	Sporty TV
Ukraine	MainCast
United States	ESPN

== See also ==
- Australian soccer league system
- A-League Women
- A-League Youth
- E-League
- List of A-League head coaches
- Soccer rivalries in Australia
