= 2009–10 Sydney FC season =

Sydney FC
2009–2010 season
- Chairman: Scott Barlow
- Manager: Vítězslav Lavička
- A-League: 1st (League); Champions (Finals)
- Top goalscorer: League: All: John Aloisi, Mark Bridge 9
- Highest home attendance: 25,407 (v. Melbourne Victory)
- Lowest home attendance: 8,359 (v. Perth Glory)
- Average home league attendance: 12,987
Home colours	Away colours

The 2009–2010 season was Sydney FC's fifth consecutive season in the A-League since its inception. It was an historic year for the club taking out the domestic double by winning the premier's plate and the championship during the season.

== Preview ==
=== Pre-season ===
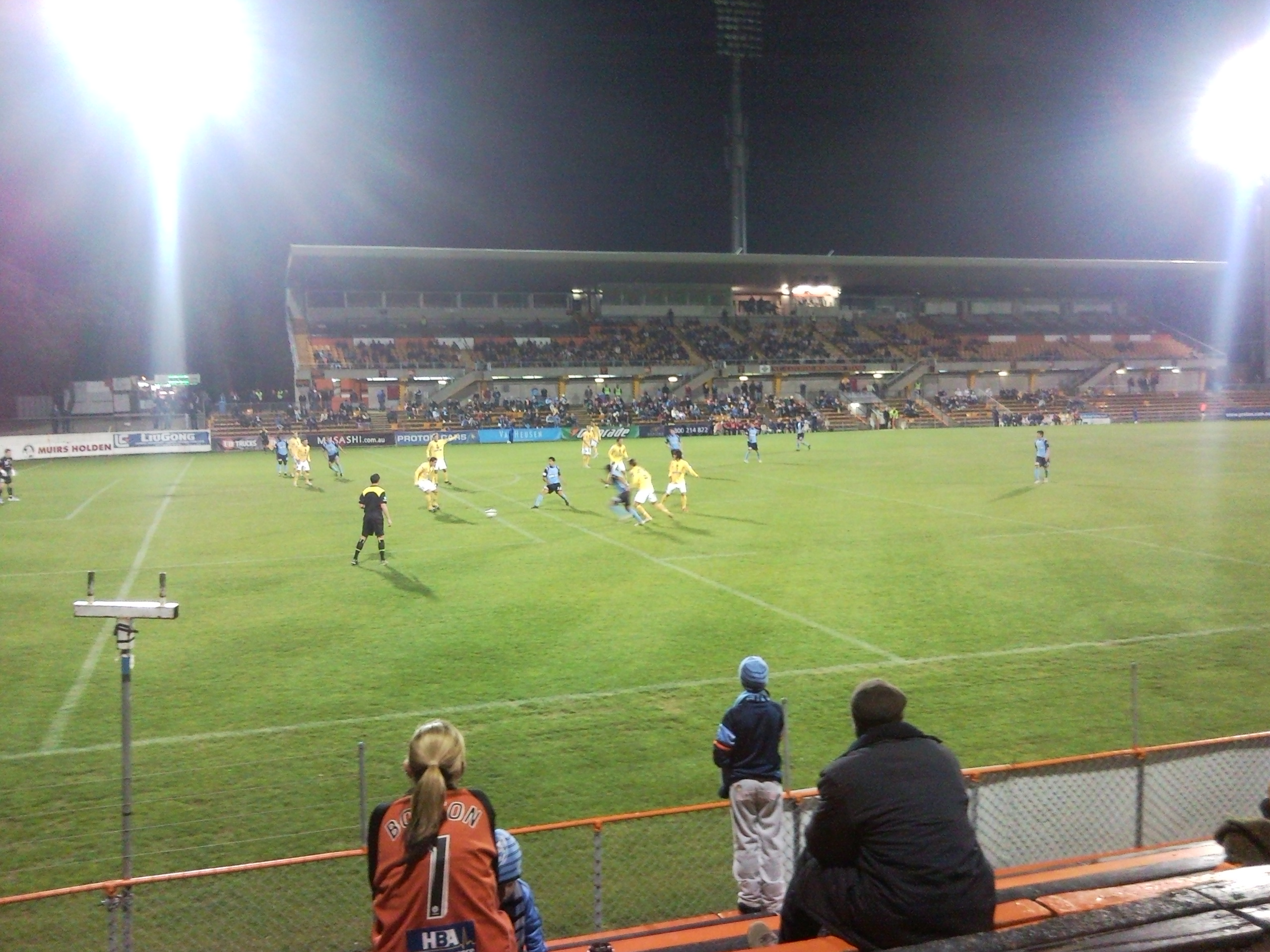
Sydney FC V Central Coast Mariners, friendly, 2009

After a disappointing 2008–09 season, Sydney FC went straight into action, sacking coach John Kosmina. A week later, Czech coach Vítězslav Lavička was signed as Sydney's fifth manager in as many seasons.

Sydney had a friendly match in China, with new sister club Shanghai Shenhua. Sydney FC lost the match 2–1, with their goal coming from striker Alex Brosque, who scored halfway through the second half to level the scores at 1–1. John Aloisi, who had a poor last season, showed he had hit form, but being very unlucky to have two goals disallowed during the first half. It was the first game for former Sydney and Socceroo Tony Popovic as caretaker coach.

On 3 April, it was confirmed that new coach Lavička had signed his first player, former Slovak international Karol Kisel, who had played under Lavička when he coached AC Sparta Prague.

Sydney was thrown into scandal involving new signing Sebastian Ryall, who was charged with the sexual assault of a 13-year-old girl, while he was playing with Melbourne Victory. He was stood down by the Football Federation Australia (FFA) from the Sydney FC, and national team until 3 September. These charges were later dropped.

When the FFA announced that the usual A-League pre-season cup wouldn't be held due to financial reasons, it meant that teams would have to organise their own friendlies in the months before the start of the season. This opened up many possibilities. Across the A-League, a few teams managed to bring over some well known sides. Sydney was linked with English Premier League side Everton for their Asian Tour, and recently relegated Middlesbrough FC, who both pulled out in the last minute, and stated that if they were to tour Australia, they would want to play more than one team. At one stage, Spanish team Barcelona FC were being rumoured to be coming out. Nevertheless, the new coach organised a dozen friendlies with strong New South Wales Premier League and New South Wales Super League teams. Despite the opposition being weaker than expected, Sydney had a fantastic start. Sydney also trialled several overseas players and on 25 June Lavicka signed South Korean Left Back Byun Sung-Hwan.

Along with the new outfits, Sydney FC also welcomed a new major sponsor, Japanese electronic company Sony, who signed a contract with Sydney. They replaced JVC, which decided not to renew their sponsorship due to the 2008 financial crisis. New South Wales-based electronics retailer Bing Lee continued to sponsor Sydney FC. Bing Lee's logo was featured on the front of the home jerseys and on the front and back of the right leg of the away jerseys, whilst Sony will now take up the away jersey, and the front and back of the right leg of the home kit. Coach Vitezslav Lavicka signed his last player of the season, Stephan Keller, on a one-year contract, who had recently been released by then Eredivisie club De Graafschap after they had been relegated. He played in the final trial game against the Jets and impressed significantly in the 1–1 draw.

=== August ===
Round 1: North Queensland Fury (away at Dairy Farmers Stadium, Townsville)

Sydney flew to Townsville to face newcomers North Queensland Fury, boasting an impressive squad that included all their VISA players. Just after 4 minutes, marquee man John Aloisi put last season's troubles behind him, opening the score on the back of a counter-attack that came off a saved Robbie Fowler free kick down the other end of the field. Sydney would double that lead to 2-0 20 minutes later through Kofi Danning, before North Queensland managed to get back into the game shortly before half time with a headed goal through a corner. The scoreline would be drawn to 2-2 several minutes after the resume of play, when Shannon Cole fouled Jason Spagnuolo in the box. God stepped up and coolly slotted the ball past Bolton who remained glued to the spot. It seemed like it would end a draw, but with 17 minutes remaining John Aloisi slotted a ball straight into the box, and a chasing Alex Brosque was tripped by a beaten Paul Henderson. John Aloisi calmly sent the keeper the wrong way and put the penalty straight down the middle, to give the visitors their first win of the season.

Round 2: Adelaide United (home at Sydney Football Stadium, Sydney)

In front of a decent first home crowd of nearly 15,000, Sydney came up against archrivals Adelaide. Always a fiery and closely contested contest, there was again nothing between the two teams. Both teams were looking very dangerous and despite some close opportunities to take the lead from both sides, they went into the half-time break locked at 0–0. The second half looked to be a battle for fitness with Sydney dominating possession in the second half and a tired Adelaide struggling to stay in the contest. Former Jets striker Mark Bridge proved to be the difference between the two clubs substituting Steve Corica midway through the half. A few minutes after coming on played a 1–2 move with Kofi Danning and belted the ball past the Adelaide goalkeeper. After almost conceding minutes from time, Sydney managed to escape with a narrow victory and move into second on the ladder behind Gold Coast United with two wins from as many games.

Round 3: Central Coast Mariners (away at Bluetongue Stadium, Gosford)

The South NSW derby was again play out in front of a smallish crowd of 10,000 on a warm Gosford afternoon. The game turned out to be once more a stalemate, similar to the 0–0 draw played at Leichhardt Oval a few months beforehand. Both sides had their chances, and despite Sydney looking fitter, it seemed to be a typical A-League style long-ball game as both sides never really gaining the upper hand. Sydney's main striker and marquee player John Aloisi came close to scoring on 76 minutes, denied by the fingertips and reflexes of the Mariners keeper Danny Vukovic. However, the sky blues custodian Clint Bolton went one better pulling off a wonder penalty-save after John Hutchinson was brought down in a clattering tackle by Simon Colosimo and Byun Sung-Hwan. The Sydney defensive pair were both lucky to not be booked. Adam Kwasnik took the penalty and was denied by Bolton, regaining the faith and trust of some Sydney FC supporters who believed was past his prime. He would save Sydney yet again minutes later, pulling off another fantastic save from Dylan MacAllister, earning himself man of the match in what was ultimately a dull match.

Round 4: Wellington Phoenix (home at Sydney Football Stadium, Sydney)

The Sydney v. Wellington Trans-Tasman matches had always proven to be Sydney's bogey, especially at the SFS. Wellington had won 2 of the 3 matches played there since their inaugural season and Sydney knew it would be a tough battle. The first half was locked in a difficult stalemate as both sides were feeling each other out, each struggling to gain the upper hand in possession. Midfielder Terry McFlynn was subbed off early for Brendan Gan with what looked to be an unfortunate thigh injury. Despite the loss of McFlynn, Sydney remained strong and dominated the possession early in the second half. Options seemed to be running out for coach Lavička when he put Steve Corica on for Kofi Danning. However, in the 77th minute Sydney gained the lead through a corner. Karol Kisel whipped the ball in and Brendan Gan (who managed to lose his defender) buried his header into the back of the net. What little air was left in Wellington's sails blew away only minutes later, when a counter-attack from a Wellington corner had Alex Brosque crossing the ball into the box where marquee striker John Aloisi angled the ball past a tired Wellington shot stopper for Sydney's well-deserved second goal. Aloisi would be subbed minutes after the goal for Matthew Jurman but the Sky Blues held on for a convincing 2–0 win. The win leapfrogged them into number one on the ladder after the Newcastle Jets defeated Gold Coast United 1–0 in Newcastle earlier in the round.

=== September ===
Round 5: Gold Coast United (away at Skilled Park, Gold Coast)

Sydney travelled to the Gold Coast's Skilled Park for the top-of-the-table clash, one point clear of opponents Gold Coast United. Gold Coast were with without Socceroo marquee player Jason Culina whilst Sydney was without Northern Irish midfielder Terry McFlynn who was replaced with former National Youth League player Rhyan Grant. The first 10 to 20 minutes saw Gold Coast dominate but Sydney's strong-knitted defence held them off. Joel Porter made a promising start to the game for the home team but in the 19th minute he was forced to be substituted due to a calf injury and was replaced by Brazilian import Robson. Alex Brosque should have scored for Sydney in the 30th minute following a clever one-two with John Aloisi but the attacking midfielder sprayed his shot wide. It took a piece of magic from Shane Smeltz just before half-time for the crowd to erupt. Matt Osman's free kick was directed towards Shane Smeltz, whose header gave goalkeeper Clint Bolton little chance as the ball looped into the corner of the net. In the 56th minute, Smeltz finished off the contest by beating Shannon Cole to an awful Karol Kisel back-pass and calmly slotting the ball past the keeper. Sydney FC gave themselves a chance of saving a draw when substitute Steve Corica headed home a Shannon Cole cross in the 75th minute and then John Aloisi had a free kick just outside the box in the 89th minute, but he slammed the ball into United's wall. The final score was 2–1 to Gold Coast United in front of another disappointing Gold Coast crowd of 6,406. Gold Coast United over took Sydney FC on the table to sit in first place with Sydney slipping down one spot to second.

Round 6: North Queensland Fury (home at Sydney Football Stadium, Sydney)

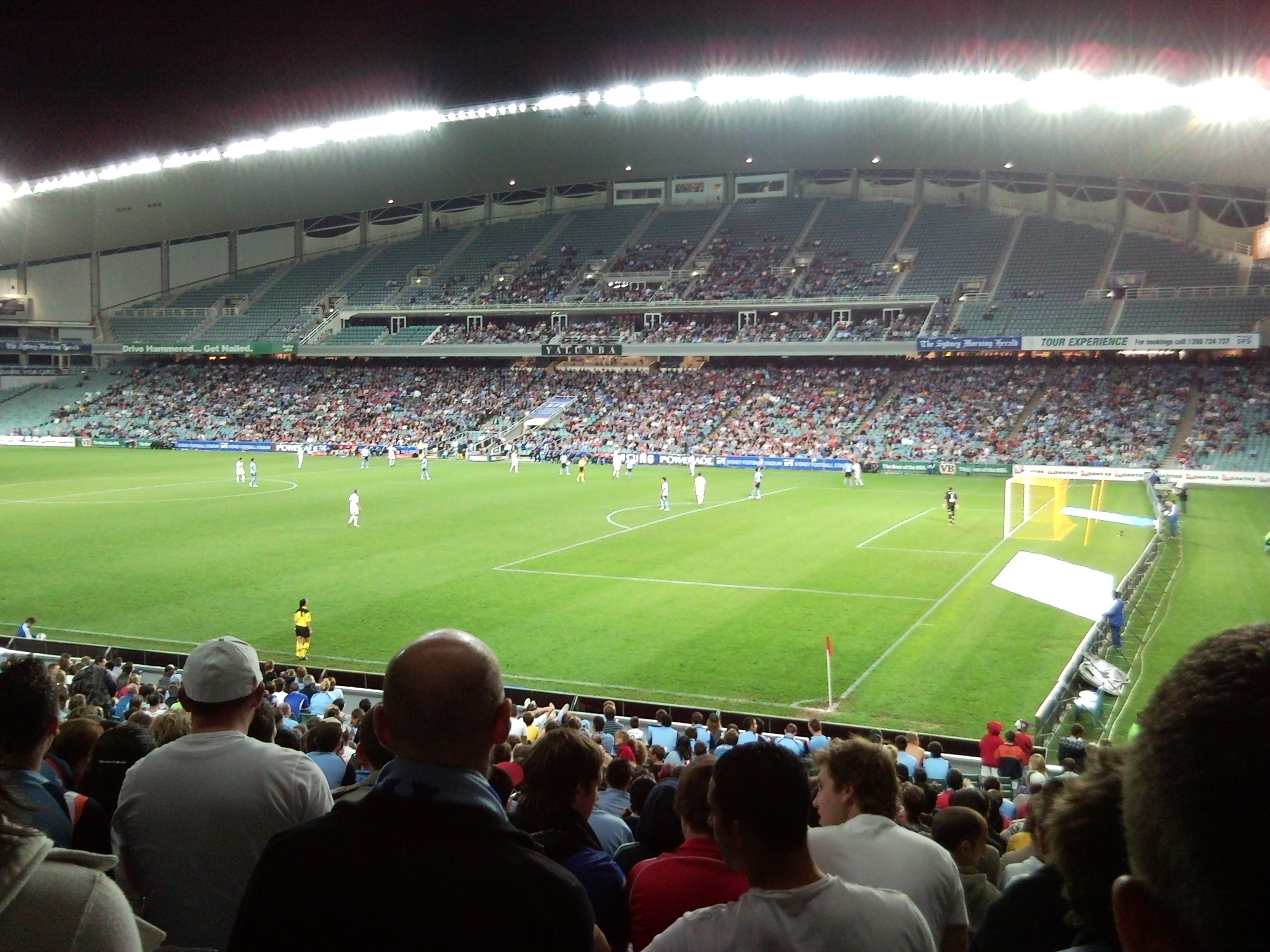
Sydney FC V North Queensland Fury 2009

Sydney would pair up against Robbie Fowler's North Queensland side sooner than expected. The match was originally scheduled to be played next door to the SFS at the historic Sydney Cricket Ground. Sydney FC were coming off a loss to Gold Coast United and were expected to beat North Queensland Fury who had yet to win a game, despite putting in solid performances against Adelaide United and Brisbane Roar in the previous weeks. A crowd of 16,699 showed up to see Robbie Fowler in town, seeing as the NRL finals were being played at the same time. Sydney started strongly and in the 26th minute received a penalty in almost identical fashion to the one received up in Townsville. John Aloisi stepped up, and in a miraculous piece of goalkeeping Paul Henderson pulled off a wonder save, denying Sydney FC the chance to go 1-0 up. The save was equally important for Henderson on a personal note, as he had been dropped the previous week after conceding 12 goals in the first 4 rounds. The morale of Sydney FC dropped, playing second fiddle to a confident North Queensland attack and lucky to go in at the break nil-all. After the break Sydney FC were at the mercy of North Queensland, rarely getting the ball into the opposition half and losing possession easily. It was only a matter of time before North Queensland scored, and in the 56th minute, they did so through Robbie Fowler. Fowler calmly chipped an out-of-position Clint Bolton outside of his 6-yard box. Any life left in Sydney's attack was immediately drained, with Fowler unlucky not to score a second 5 minutes later. Despite a late frenzied attack with Kofi Danning at the helm Sydney were unable to equalise. Sydney conceded their second straight defeat, losing the game 0–1.

Round 7: Newcastle Jets (home at Sydney Football Stadium, Sydney)

Both teams were coming off back to back losses in this highly anticipated round 7 clash. Both teams were suffering from an injury laden squad, with Newcastle having to bring Albanian-Australian Labinot Haliti and Iraqi International Ali Abbas Al-Hilfi on loan to replace injured players, while Sydney were relying on a third-string squad with key players out injured Karol Kisel (flu), Stephan Keller (Calf), John Aloisi (knee) and Terry McFlynn (thigh). Young Guns Kofi Danning and Chris Payne were also out of the squad on Young Socceroos duty. The game started strongly with both teams taking advantage of several mistakes. Newcastle had a golden opportunity to take the lead in the 23rd minute via a penalty for a push in the box. The penalty was saved by a heroic Clint Bolton, saving his second penalty out of three this season. This save gave Sydney a massive boost of confidence and no less than 5 minutes later Mark Bridge fired a rocket of a shot from the edge of the 18-yard box into the top corner, giving Sydney the lead and his second goal of the season. Although the lead wouldn't last long. 6 minutes later a cross into the box had Clint Bolton saving the shot but tipping it away to an open Matt Thompson, who tapped it in past an outstretched Bolton. The scores stayed locked at 1-1 going into half time, but 10 minutes into the second half Alex Brosque was fouled by Ben Kennedy in the box. Steve Corica coolly stepped up and slotted it in the top right corner past an outstretched palm. Despite a desperate Newcastle attack, Sydney held on for a very unconvincing 2–1 victory.

Round 8: Brisbane Roar (away at Suncorp Stadium, Brisbane)

Sydney flew up to face Queensland rivals Brisbane Roar in what was considered to be the State of Origin clash in the A-League. Brisbane were coming off a 4–2 loss to Perth Glory the week before and Sydney were coming off a 2–1 victory but were still seen as the underdogs despite key players Karol Kisel and Stephan Keller being included back in the squad, returning from minor injuries. Sydney started strongly, their confidence from a stronger squad showing, and had some early chances. However Brisbane would not be deterred and the game swung back and forth until half time when both teams went in 0–0. The second half was much of the same affair, Sydney having a lot of good opportunities, including 2 skied shots from striker Mark Bridge, which commentators and fellow Sydney supporters thought should have gone in. However Sydney couldn't hold their defence. 15 minutes before full-time, Brisbane had 90% of the possession and despite a brave Sydney defence doing their best to stop Brisbane from scoring, the effort fell through 5 minutes before full-time. Dutch striker Serginho van Dijk managed to get one past Bolton on Brisbane's third consecutive corner, giving his fourth goal against Sydney FC in two meetings. For the final five or so minutes, Sydney threw everything but the kitchen sink at the Brisbane defence in the hope to salvage a draw, however despite them coming close on a couple of occasions, Liam Reddy's goal remained a fortress and Brisbane hung onto a narrow 1–0 victory.

=== October ===
Round 9: Central Coast Mariners (home at Sydney Football Stadium, Sydney)

The South NSW derby is an anticipated clash between Sydney and Gosford. Geographically the teams are 90 km apart, making the travel accessible for fans of the away side. Sydney FC welcomed back Terry McFlynn who had been out of the squad for the best part of a month with injury, but also welcomed the birth of his new child. He got his return started in the 21st minute, when Stuart Musialik held the ball outside the box, to put in a cross, which Terry shot into the top right hand corner. With minutes to go defender Stephan Keller was involved in a head clash attempting to head a ball, and was lying motionless on the ground, and had to be stretchered off. It was feared he had seriously injured his knee, however it was later revealed his knee was fine, and was suffering minor-concussion. He is expected to play next week against the Melbourne Victory at Etihad Stadium. It was a clean match considering the derby, with controversial referee Matthew Breeze not awarding a single yellow or red card to either sets of players.

Round 10: Melbourne Victory FC (away at Etihad Stadium, Melbourne)

Round 10 was the perfect opportunity to hold the A-League's Biggest Rivalry. Sydney and Melbourne fans hated each other with a passion, and this season it was no different. Sydney and Melbourne were positions 1 and 2 respectively on the table, the first time this had ever happened, and it only served to fuel the rivalry even more. Over 30,000 packed into Melbourne's Etihad Stadium to see the clash, both sides were at full strength, aside from Sydney FC missing Swiss defender Stephan Keller with a knee injury he had picked up the week before. The match started strongly, with Melbourne having good opportunities in the first 10 minutes through their imports Ney Fabiano and Carlos Hernández. However it would be Sydney FC who turned up the heat, in a blitz of goals, that left not only the Melbourne players in shock, but left the crowd silent (aside from the 1,000 Cove who had flown down). In the 14th minute, Sydney had a free kick outside the box, which Steve Corica took, the ball found its way soon after to Simon Colosimo on the wing, who whipped it in, and found a rising Alex Brosque header, which found its way into the back of the net. Alex Brosque scored his first of the season, and the first of what would become a landslide of pressure. Minutes later after the kickoff, Sydney were breaking once more, Terry McFlynn got a lovely ball through to striker Mark Bridge, who swivelled, and slotted the ball through Evan Berger's legs, and into the bottom right hand corner of the goal. The crowd was stunned, 2 goals in almost as many minutes had the entire state of Victoria reeling. Again after the kickoff, Sydney raced down the win, Shannon Cole this time putting in a perfectly weighted cross, which Mark Bridge latched onto and put away to make it 3–0. It Seemed Sydney were unstoppable, and were unlucky to get a fourth through Terry McFlynn who attempted to chip keeper Glen Moss. He beat the keeper, and just when it seemed they had the goal, it bounced off the post and out of play. The Second half started as deadly as it had finished. Shannon Cole made a break, using some tricky footwork to get past the defence, and drove a shot, beating a diving Moss and narrowly scraping the outside of the post. Sydney would hold onto the lead, despite a spirited Melbourne fightback, in which Archie Thompson came close, but Sydney held on to the 3–0 win, leaving them at the top of the table, with by 4 points, which would be narrowed down to 2, due to other results.

Round 11: Adelaide United (away at Hindmarsh Stadium, Adelaide)

Sydney travelled to Adelaide on the back of their largest win against Melbourne Victory full of confidence. Everything was pointing towards a massive Sydney win - Adelaide themselves had come off a loss, were missing several key players. Adelaide lost Defensive Midfielder Fabien Barbiero in the opening 10 minutes after he pulled down Mark Bridge as he made a break and was bound to score from a 1-on-1 with goalkeeper Eugene Galekovic. Despite the one-man advantage, Sydney couldn't convert all the first half, and were put immediately on the back foot when Cristiano put Adelaide up 1-0 from a corner. Sydney went into the break 1-0 down, despite being 1-0 up, and came out into the second half more focused, after being berated by coach Vitezslav Lavicka at half time. It only got worse for Sydney FC, conceding yet another goal from a corner halfway through the second half. Clint Bolton got his gloves to the ball, but they were too slippery from the rain to get much grip and the ball trickled into the side netting, giving Cristiano his second. Some strong resilience was shown from the Sydney team, and marquee striker John Aloisi got 1 back with 10 minutes remaining, and Sydney would consider themselves very unlucky not to get themselves a second. However Adelaide United held on for a gutsy victory.

Round 12: Brisbane Roar (home at Sydney Football Stadium, Sydney)

Sydney had their first home game after being on the road for 2 weeks, against a Brisbane Roar who were still reeling from their losing streak, and coach of 4 years Frank Farina being sacked for Drink Driving. It was the first game in charge for coach Ange Postecoglou who had previously taken former-NSL team Melbourne Knights to a double-championship. Sydney were hoping that the "curse of the new coach". Brisbane were also going into the game with a cut-down squad, key players of Craig Moore and Scottish internationals Charlie Miller and Bob Malcolm out with injury. Despite going into half time 0-0 Sydney were the stronger team, and their strength would prove shortly after half time when striker Alex Brosque beat 2 defenders in his trademark style and put the ball away to give Sydney a 1–0 lead. Shortly after that new Slovak import Karol Kisel opened up his goal account after being found in open space, and drove a powerful low shot, past Liam Reddy to make the scoreline 2–0. It appeared that would be enough for the Sydney side, but the Roar dug deep, and minutes after Sydney's second got a goal back through their youth player Isaka Cernak which inspired great confidence through the Brisbane team, and despite some very good shooting, and close calls, Sydney's defence held strong, and remained strong to hold onto a 2–1 victory, and not for the first time this season, - retaking their lead on the top of the ladder, pleasing the manager.

=== November ===
Round 13: Wellington Phoenix (home at Sydney Football Stadium, Sydney)

Sydney came into the game looking to extend their 1-point lead the a healthy 4-point lead over arch-rivals Melbourne Victory, and were up against trans-Tasman rivals Wellington Phoenix - who the week before had come off a season-record 6-0 thumping of Gold Coast United in Wellington. Under previous administrations the Phoenix had been the "bogey" team for Sydney FC, but went into the game with some confidence, boasting a strong squad and the knowledge, they had already beaten them 2-0 earlier that season at the same venue. Sydney got off to a cracking start with Striker Alex Brosque setting up Mark Bridge to open the scoring for Sydney. Not too soon later, Brosque would once more weave his magic past the Phoenix defence, and play a square ball to captain Steve Corica who tapped it in from no more than 2 yards. Wellington were backpedaling fast and losing confidence quicker than they could count the accurate passes the Sydney team were firing to each other. Shortly before the half-time interval Alex Brosque put the final icing on the cake, making a marvelous run down the far wing, outpacing the Wellington defence, setting Bridge up for his 2nd. They went into the sheds 3-0 up at the interval, something which was almost reminiscent of the scoreline against Melbourne a month earlier at Etihad Stadium. The second half started off as it finished; Sydney controlled the match from the defence through to the strikers. Despite the best efforts Sydney couldn't extend the lead, but the Nix managed to get a consolation goal through substitute Costa Barbarouses. Alex Brosque, and John Aloisi both came agonisingly close in the second half but the match finished 3–1 and Sydney scooted to a short 4-point lead before Melbourne beat Perth Glory 2–1.

Round 14: Gold Coast United (away at Skilled Park, Gold Coast)

Sydney FC returned to the coast confident they'd be able to serve up revenge on the Gold Coast after losing to them 2–1 earlier in the season, however despite Gold Coast's consistent off-field drama containing owner Clive Palmer Gold Coast managed to get their season back on track and win 1–0 via a Shane Smeltz goal early in the first half.

Round 15: Perth Glory (away at ME Bank Stadium, Perth)

Sydney FC's troubling away form this season would again be the main talking point after this match. Only having won twice in from all their away games, something which not only troubled the fans, but the players and the coach. The match was to be a tale of two-halves. Sydney dominated the first half, creating chances, and generally putting the Glory under plenty of pressure, despite the pressure put on the team by the Glory support group "The Shed". However the table would be turned in the second half, with Perth getting 2 goals through Scott Bulloch and their Serbian import Branko Jelic. Perth would hold onto the lead and win 2–0.

Round 16: Newcastle Jets (home at Sydney Football Stadium, Sydney)

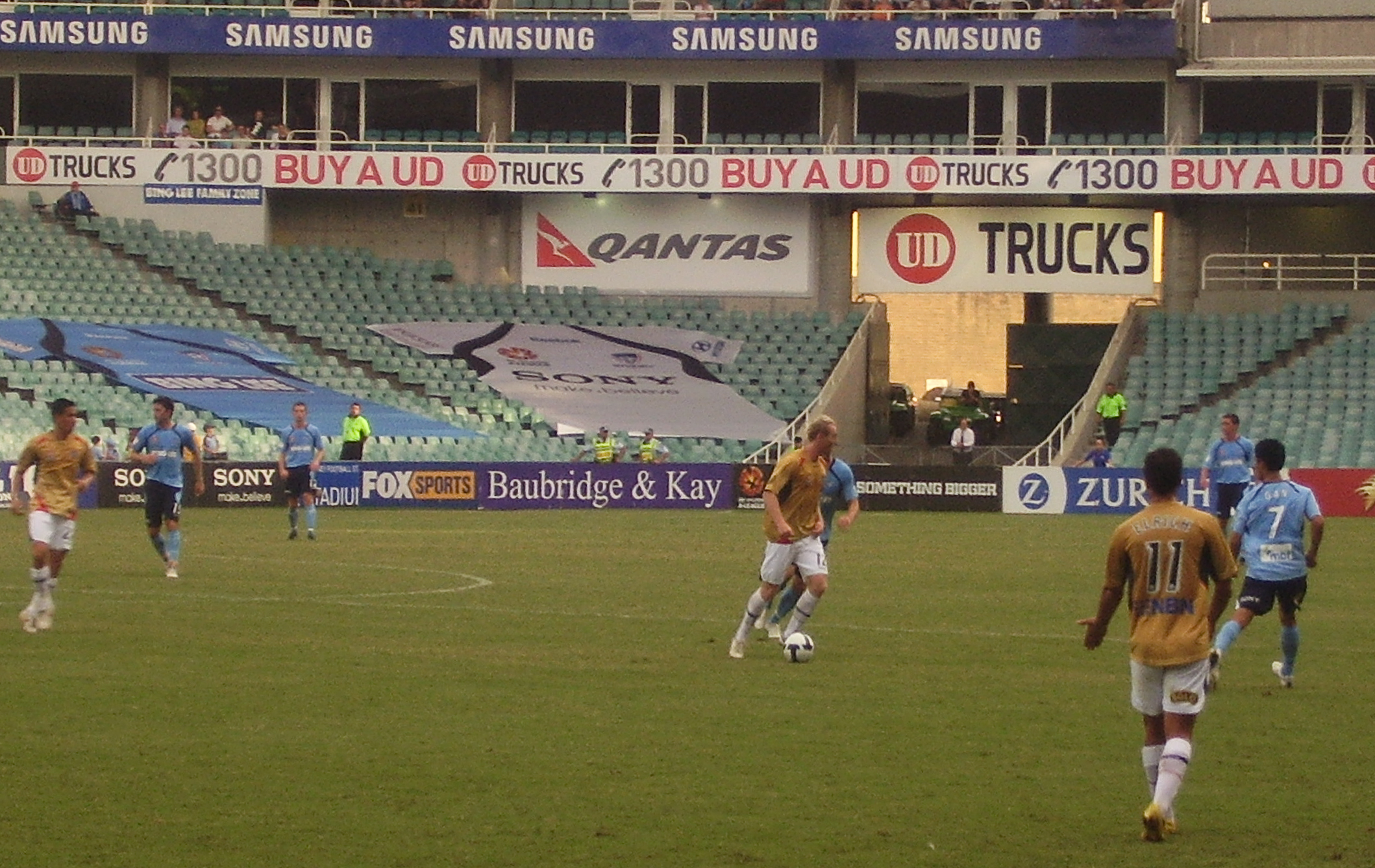
Sydney FC V Newcastle Jets, November 2009

Sydney went into the first home game in a fortnight confident they would be able to get their season back on track, having previously beaten Newcastle 2–1 earlier in the season. Newcastle were also languishing at the bottom of the table, and their coach, and former Sydney coach Branko Culina under increasing pressure to make their team perform, especially after some controversial comments in the media during the week. However the crowd of just over 10,000 would be shocked to the foundations when early in the first half, young player Rhyan Grant gave away a penalty, former Sydney FC striker Michael Bridges who played for the club on loan from then Premier League club Hull City stepped up to take the penalty, and despite loud heckling from the Sydney supporters, put the ball past Bolton. If Sydney fans were not worried, they now had a reason to be, as Sydney had never come back from a 1–0 deficit. The Halftime Scoreline read 1–0, but early into the second period of play, a momentarily lapse in concentration by the Sydney defence gave Michael Bridges his second, and his fifth for the season. The fans fell silent for the first time all day, and would be stunned to their seats minutes later when Newcastle club captain and new Melbourne Heart recruit Matt Thompson knocked in a third to make it 3–0 to the visitors. Sydney managed to pull back a consolation goal through some good tough attacking play by Marquee player John Aloisi who put in a cross to Alex Brosque who knocked it in, but it was a case of too little, too late for the Sky blues, leaving them languishing in second place, 5 points behind rivals Melbourne Victory and only one point clear of Gold Coast United and Central Coast Mariners, as well as reeling from their third straight loss, and in the midst of a form slump.

=== December ===
Round 17: North Queensland Fury (home at Sydney Football Stadium, Sydney)

North Queensland Fury are considered the Dark Horses of the Hyundai A-League, and Sydney FC treated this match very carefully, knowing full well that North Queensland had come away from the Sydney Football Stadium with a 1–0 victory earlier in the season, However it was clear from the outset, that the form slump that had been troubling Sydney FC in the previous month had cleared, as a well defined attack tore the North Queensland defence to shreds. Sydney FC were up 2–0 at the half time break, thanks to goals by marquee John Aloisi and in-form Striker Alex Brosque. The second half was a similar tale to that of the first, Brosque got his second goal of the game, after a free kick left him with a mile of space to head the ball home, and despite North Queensland getting a scrappy goal late in the half, Sydney FC would be too powerful, with ageing star midfielder Steve Corica rising above players much younger than him to head the ball into the back of the net from a cross, to give Sydney 4 goals, and a much needed 3 points.

Round 18: Wellington Phoenix (away at FMG Stadium, Palmerston North, New Zealand)

Wellington and Sydney games had always been closely contested affairs, but Wellington had already lost twice against the Sky Blues, and were undefeated at home at their regular home ground of Westpac Stadium, Wellington. It was a very windy day with winds of up to 100 km/h recorded, making it difficult to keep possession. However, a penalty won by striker Alex Brosque in the first half would prove to be the difference between the teams with Captain and team veteran Steve Corica slotting the goal home. Goalkeeper Clint Bolton made vital saves during the game to keep Sydney in the lead, and move them to the top of the ladder.

Round 19: Central Coast Mariners (home at Sydney Football Stadium, Sydney)

Round 19 for the 2009/10 season had been scheduled so that each team would play a midweek game. Sydney FC and the Mariners squared off on 23 December and a healthy crowd of 12,689 were present to witness Sydney FC defeat their F3 Freeway rivals 1–0 via an Alex Brosque goal in the 34th minute of play. It turned into a dirty match with the Central Coast picking up several yellow cards towards the end of the game, capping a good 9 points in 3 games for the team from Sydney.

Round 20: Melbourne Victory (away at Etihad Stadium, Melbourne)

The Sydney V Melbourne rivalry was played in front of a crowd of approximately 30,000 people at Melbourne's Docklands, in a match which always provided excitement, flair, controversy and some good football. Both teams had strong squads, and at the current time were sitting first and second respectively on the ladder, the winner of the match to either keep or take first spot. However Melbourne started the game the stronger but Sydney FC's waterproof defence held its nerve once more and refused to give in, despite some shots going off the cross bar from Archie Thompson and Carlos Hernández. Sydney counter-attacked when it was able, but could not break the Victory defence either. At the end of 90 minutes the game was still locked at 0–0 and the game finished a draw, both sides taking a point from the encounter.

Round 21: Adelaide United (home at Sydney Football Stadium, Sydney)

Adelaide United came to Sydney with low expectations despite beating Sydney 2–1 at Hindmarsh Stadium earlier in the year. On the bottom of the ladder, low on confidence and goals, with their coach Aurelio Vidmar being in the news for all the wrong reasons, they had nothing to lose and everything to gain. However they were never in the game from the start, and some good solid possession from Sydney, kept Adelaide at bay, and despite Sydney FC winning 1–0, possession wise it was a thrashing. Sydney remained at the top of the ladder, keeping Adelaide rooted to the bottom of the ladder, scratching their heads looking for more answers then excuses.

=== January ===
Round 22: Perth Glory (away at ME Bank Stadium, Perth)

Sydney's first game after the new year would be a tough one, having several key players out (Alex Brosque & Simon Colosimo out in Kuwait on national team duty, and Matthew Jurman, Rhyan Grant, Seb Ryall, Kofi Danning all out injured for the rest of the season. Now lacking depth in the defence, Vitezslav Lavicka quickly signed former Socceroo Hayden Foxe on a short-term deal until the end of the season, and promoted Sam Gallagher from Sydney's youth squad. Confidence was high, as Sydney were sitting 5 points ahead of rivals Melbourne Victory and held on to a 0–0 draw, with Sydney unlucky not to score 2 goals at the death via captain Steve Corica and young striker Chris Payne.

Round 23: Gold Coast United (home at Sydney Football Stadium, Sydney)

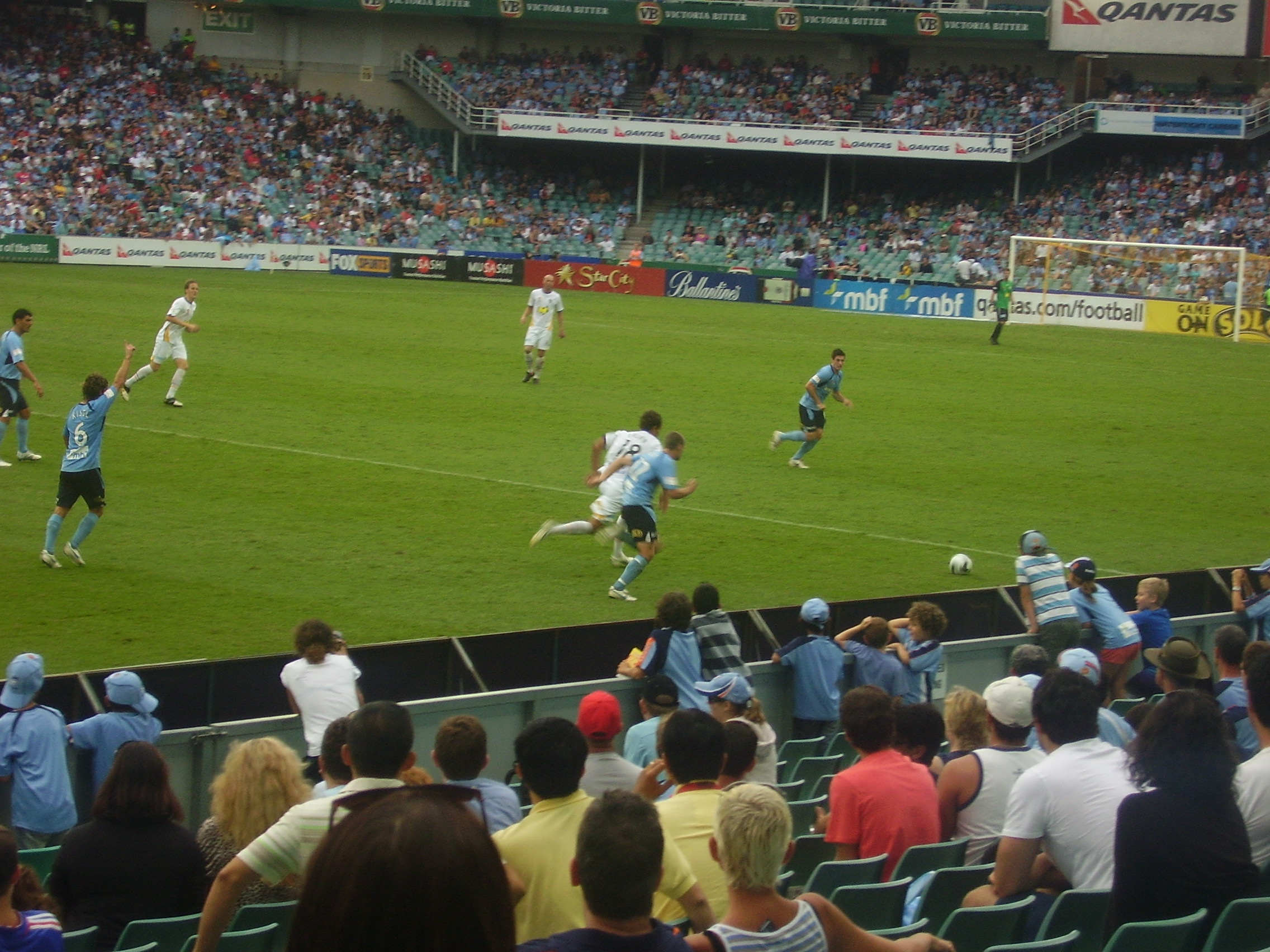
Sydney FC V Gold Coast United January 2010

Gold Coast United under coach Miron Bleiberg had become a force to reckon with in their inaugural season, unlike their counterparts North Queensland Fury, Gold Coast had built a strong squad around Socceroo Jason Culina, and marquee player and New Zealand Striker Shane Smeltz. Gold Coast had overtaken Melbourne Victory into 2nd on the ladder after 2 strong performances the week previously against Adelaide United and Newcastle Jets. Sydney started the game poorly, coming under a lot of pressure from a fired up, confident Gold Coast team. Gold Coast would end up scoring the only goal of the game halfway through the first half through former Hartlepool United striker Joel Porter. Despite a good performance from John Aloisi Sydney failed to hit the straps and shoot, and succumbed, dropping one place to second on the ladder, with Gold Coast snatching the top spot by 1 point.

Round 24: Newcastle Jets (away at EnergyAustralia Stadium, Newcastle)

After going down to Gold Coast United the week before Sydney were keen to avenge their 1–3 loss earlier in the season to Newcastle at home at the Sydney Football Stadium. Sydney started the game the better side, unlucky not to get a couple of early goals, however the Jets patience paid off when Jobe Wheelhouse scored for the home team a little over half an hour into the game. This spelt bad news for the travelling sky blues, as they had a curse of not being able to come back after conceding. However the gods were smiling upon the Sydney faithful when marquee player John Aloisi broke through the Jets defence in Extra Time of the first half and slotted the ball into the side netting for the Sky Blues, leading them into the half time whistle 1-1. The goal was an obvious puncture in Newcastle's balloon, and they came out a deflated side, Sydney all over the home side, and halfway through the second period Sydney FC were rewarded when midfielder (and former Newcastle Jets grandfinalist) Stuart Musialik fired off a shot from 28 meters out, beating a stunned Newcastle defence, and an even more shocked Ben Kennedy who failed to move a muscle due to him not being able to see the shot. Young striker Chris Payne sealed the victory late into Extra Time of the second period when he danced around several tired Newcastle defenders and fired a low shot past the Keeper to seal a 3–1 victory for Sydney FC.

Round 25: Brisbane Roar (away at Suncorp Stadium, Brisbane)

A win against Brisbane would see Sydney FC back to the top of the ladder however their record away from home at Brisbane's Suncorp Stadium was far from good, having last won there in the early rounds of the A-League 2007-08 season. Both teams were playing some good football, and Sydney FC had the majority of the chances, but like most weeks, despite their good ball passing and possession they failed to put their chances away. Goalkeeper Clint Bolton can thank some poor refereeing for not being sent off midway through the first half, when he clearly handled the ball outside the 18-yard box after attempted to save an on-target attempt from Brisbane Brazilian striker Reinaldo. Despite several clear cut chances, Sydney failed to score, and Brisbane grabbed a goal at the death, from their leading goalscorer and striker Serginho van Dijk.

=== February ===
Round 26: Perth Glory (home at Parramatta Stadium, Sydney)

A must win game this was for Sydney FC, as it would keep them in contention for a top 2 finish providing Gold Coast United lost. Sydney started strongly and got their reward when Shannon Cole was tripped in the box early in the first half. Steve Corica slotted the resulting penalty straight down the middle to give Sydney a 1–0 lead. However Perth equalised on the stroke of half time, through Wayne Srhoj after some sloppy Sydney FC defending from a corner levelled the score at 1–1. However Sydney would retake the lead through marquee man John Aloisi when his mistimed kick appeared to have been cleared, however the ball controversially went through a hole in the side netting, with referee Chris Beath ruling no goal. Protests from the Sydney players, led by a fired-up Aloisi, led to Beath consulting with his assistant on the Eastern side of the ground who confirmed it was a goal. Beath overruled his earlier decision and ruled a goal, much to the delight of the Sydney FC fans and supporters, however 10 minutes later Perth would score again, through Daniel McBreen who scored his 4th goal for the club in as many games. It looked like the game would finish a tie, however Swiss import Stephan Keller launched a cross which found a leaping John Aloisi who headed the ball powerfully past the keeper into the back of the net to give Sydney a 3–2 win, and ultimately put the decider against Melbourne Victory next the next week.

Round 27: Melbourne Victory (home at Sydney Football Stadium, Sydney)

The title decider had come to the final game of the final round, between the A-League's biggest rivals, Sydney FC and Melbourne Victory. The pressure was on Sydney, who needed to win to claim the Premiership, with Melbourne needing a draw at worst. Nearly 26,000 fans packed into the SFS to watch the game, with the majority of those clad in Sky Blue. Both teams started the game off strongly with early chances for both sides, however in the 34th minute Sydney's Slovak import Karol Kisel who had been criticised all season for his inaccurate shooting, sent the Sydney fans in the stands into raptures, when a shot from 25 meters out fired into the back of the net. A 1–0 lead was crucial and it sent the Melbourne fans in the away bay crazy, turning on each other, with a fight starting. Police and security rushed to the away bay, but it took a good 10 minutes to calm the away bay, after several flares had been lit, and bottles and beer cups thrown onto the field. The second half started the same way it had finished both sides testing each other's strengths and it would be Sydney who broke the game in half, with marquee man, and hero John Aloisi getting the ball on the halfway line and sprinting up the field uncontested, before launching a rocket of a shot into the net, past a stunned Mitchell Langerak who could do nothing but watch as the ball bounced past him. The Sydney players and fans went wild, and it took a good 4 minutes for play to restart. With 10 minutes to go the fans were getting edgy and glancing at the clock, and with 2 minutes to go started a countdown until the final whistle. Sydney would hold onto the 2–0 lead, and claim the championship, sending the fans into celebration, despite the pouring rain which had started earlier. It would also be Steve Coricas final game for the club, who had announced his retirement at the end of the season, however an injury in the 18th minute of play meant that he would ultimately not play in the finals series, however he received a well earned standing ovation and did a lap of honour with the premiers plate.

=== Semi final ===
Leg 1: Melbourne Victory (away at Etihad Stadium, Melbourne)

Sydney travelled back down to Melbourne for the third time this season to play Melbourne in the first leg of the major semi final. Sydney were without team legend Steve Corica who had announced his retirement due to a hamstring injury. As a result, Vitezslav Lavicka promoted youth team midfielder Iain Ramsay. The pitch at Etihad Stadium was a disgrace, with many parts of it brown and dead, after having an ACDC concert earlier in the week. Melbourne got the upper hand early, when Nick Mrdja, Melbourne controversial loan signing scored in the 16th minute. Later in the half Costa Rican international Carlos Hernandez scored to make it 2–0. However John Aloisi scored 3 minutes later to peg one back. However the score remained the same, meaning for Sydney to win, they need to win 1-0 during the next leg in Sydney.

Leg 2: Melbourne Victory (home at Sydney Football Stadium, Sydney)

A large crowd greeted the two rivals back up to Sydney and despite Melbourne coming into the game 2-1 up, the knowledge that the last time they had come up to Sydney they had lost the Premiership 2–0. However it would be Melbourne who would strike first Robbie Kruse turned his defender from 25 years and fired in a shot that slammed into the top corner, inching past the fingertips of a flying Clint Bolton, it looked possibly over for the harbourside team. However Sydney would get right back in it when striker Alex Brosque was tripped in the box. Slovak international Karol Kisel slotted home the penalty to even the scores at 1-1. They went into half time 1-1, however Sydney would come out the stronger team and soon after the second half started, Mark Bridge fired home a goal from just outside the penalty box. Sydney led 2-1 and the scores were locked at 2–2 on aggregate. The rest of the half was played out at an exciting tempo - both sides attacking, with Melbourne and Sydney both coming close to taking the lead. However full-time blew with Sydney leading 2-1 but on aggregate only 2-2. The game went into Extra Time, both sides well aware of a possible penalty shootout - however late into extra time it would be Melbourne who would score the decisive goal. A dubious handball call on Sydney FC's Terry McFlynn allowed Melbourne a free kick just outside the penalty box. However Sydney were slow to react and make the blocking wall - many player still arguing with the referee. Melbourne took a quick free kick and Archie Thompson slotted the ball past a stunned Clint Bolton to level the scores at 2-2 and give Melbourne a 3-2 aggregate lead. Melbourne would go on to win the game, and gain their spot in the Grand Final down in Melbourne, Sydney would be forced to play the Wellington Phoenix in the Preliminary final, who had earlier defeated the Newcastle Jets 3–1 at Westpac Stadium.

=== Preliminary final ===
Preliminary final: Wellington Phoenix (home at Sydney Football Stadium, Sydney)

A smaller than expected crowd of just over 13,000 showed up at the SFS to watch the Premiers take on the Wellington Phoenix whose run into the finals had been very good. However, it was tipped that Sydney would dominate the game from the start and that's exactly what happened. Chris Payne would be the hero for Sydney - scoring first. However Wellington would equalise and claw back into the game, but the turning point of the match would be late in the first half from a free kick. Karol Kisel whipped the ball into the box, and from the initial play, it appeared Payne had headed the ball into the net past a stunned Liam Reddy - however despite celebrations from the Sydney team, the entire Wellington team blew up at the referee. Replays would show, that whilst attempting to head the ball into the net, the ball had deflected off his hand. The goal was dubbed 'Hand of Payne' and later in the post-match interviews, Wellington manager Ricki Herbert would compare the goal to Theirry Henry's deliberate handball against Ireland 'Hand of Frog' and Diego Maradona's infamous 'Hand of God'. However Wellington never recovered from the incident and in the second half, two great goals from Alex Brosque and Mark Bridge stretched the lead to 4–1, however Eugene Dadi would get a consolation goal back for Wellington in the dying seconds of the second half, in pouring rain. Sydney went on to win 4-2 and book their spot in the 2010 A-League Grand Final.

=== Grand Final ===
Grand final: Melbourne Victory (away at Etihad Stadium, Melbourne)

The grand final that, the FFA, A-League, and football fans all around Australia had been waiting 5 years for. A grand final between the two best teams in Australia, Sydney FC and Melbourne Victory. Throughout the season they had been at loggerheads with each other, never allowing either to be on top of the table for more than 2 games at a time. However Sydney had already dealt a blow to Melbourne, taking the Premiership plate off them back in the Round 27 clash at the Sydney Football Stadium, however Melbourne had got a little revenge by winning the semi-final - allowing them to host the final. Melbourne were also looking to win te grand final in consecutive year, the first time they would have done that - it was the first time any A-League team had been in the grand final in consecutive years, so it was only fitting that Melbourne went into the game as favourites. A crowd of 48,000 packed out Melbourne's Etihad Stadium the tension had been building all week. Melbourne's hopes took a massive blow early on in the game when start striker and marquee player Archie Thompson suffered an anterior cruciate ligament injury, scans later revealing this, meaning he would not play for at least 12 months. The scores were deadlocked 0–0 at half time, with what had been described as an uneventful game up until half time. This would all change in the second half. In the 63rd minute Rodrigo Vargas looked to have scored for Melbourne, however his celebrations were cut short by an offside flag. In the confusion that followed Sydney counterattacked and 10 seconds later, Mark Bridge scored, sending the away bay into fits of hysteria. Sydney were up 1-0 and Melbourne looked shellshocked, Sydney had the opportunity to go 2-0 up, however nerves got the better of young striker Chris Payne who missed an open goal shot. However Sydney's defence got sloppy, and later in the 81st minute, it would be Adrian Leijer who equalised for the home side, sending the entire stadium bar the Sydney away bay into celebrations. As a result, Sydney's confidence took a blow to the belly, and Melbourne could smell blood in the water, and can be considered very unlucky when young Aziz Behich missed a chance to go 2-1 up.

With the Full-time scores locked at 1-1, the game went into extra time, however neither side managed to have many good attacking opportunities, fatigue getting the better of most of the players. With the end of extra time - 120 minutes, still deadlocked at 1-1 the game went into penalties, yet another first for a grand final. It was deemed Sydney would take the first shot on goal.

Simon Colosimo calmly put the ball past Mitchell Langerak to give Sydney a 1–0 advantage. Kevin Muscat stepped up next, however his shot hit the right upright, sending Sydney players and fans alike into celebrations. It would be a bad omen for Melbourne. Shannon Cole next stepped up for Sydney, however his shot was saved, dragging Melbourne right back into the shootout. Grant Brebner would level the scores at 1-1 putting all the pressure back onto Sydney. However, if there was any pressure, the Sydney players were not showing it, Hayden Foxe nearly ripped the net off with his penalty, whilst Clint Bolton pulled off a wonderful save from Melbourne's Costa Rican international Marvin Angulo. Karol Kisel would score his penalty to give Sydney a 3–1 lead. Leigh Broxham would give Melbourne a faint glimmer of hope, when he scored to make it 3–2, however Sydney FC's Korean import Byun Sung-Hwan stepped up to take the final penalty. If he scored, Sydney won, if he missed or it was saved the shootout would continue. However he calmly stepped up and sent Langerak the wrong way. Sydney FC had won the 2010 Grand Final, doing what nobody had predicted at the beginning of the season - not only winning the grand final, doing the double, and taking the Premiership and Championship of Melbourne.

Melbourne
Sydney

MELBOURNE VICTORY:
GK	1	(Australia) Mitchell Langerak
DF	2	(Australia) Kevin Muscat (c)		(yellow card) 62'
DF	5	(Thailand) Surat Sukha			(substituted off) 71'
MF	6	(Australia) Leigh Broxham
FW	8	(Scotland) Grant Brebner
FW	10	(Australia) Archie Thompson			(substituted off) 16'
DF	12	(Australia) Rodrigo Vargas
MF	16	(Costa Rica) Carlos Hernández
FW	21	(Australia) Robbie Kruse
MF	22	(Australia) Nick Ward			(substituted off) 76'
DF	23	(Australia) Adrian Leijer	81'
Substitutes:
GK	20	(New Zealand) Glen Moss
MF	11	(Costa Rica) Marvin Angulo			(substituted on) 16'
DF	17	(Australia) Matthew Foschini
DF	19	(Australia) Evan Berger		(yellow card) 100'	(substituted on) 71'
FW	25	(Australia) Aziz Behich			(substituted on) 76'
Manager:
(Scotland) Ernie Merrick Joe Marston Medal: (Australia) Simon Colosimo Assistant Referees: Fourth Official:Matthew Breeze

SYDNEY FC:
GK	1	(Australia) Clint Bolton
DF	2	(Australia) Sebastian Ryall		(yellow card) 26'
DF	3	(Switzerland) Stephan Keller
DF	4	(Australia) Simon Colosimo		(yellow card) 51'
MF	6	(Slovakia) Karol Kisel		(yellow card) 84'
MF	8	(Australia) Stuart Musialik			(substituted off) 105'
FW	14	(Australia) Alex Brosque			(substituted off) 116'
MF	15	(Northern Ireland) Terry McFlynn (c)
FW	16	(Australia) Chris Payne			(substituted off) 75'
FW	19	(Australia) Mark Bridge	63'	(yellow card) 31'
DF	22	(South Korea) Byun Sung-Hwan
Substitutes:
GK	20	(Australia) Ivan Necevski
DF	5	(Australia) Hayden Foxe			(substituted on) 105'
MF	7	(Australia) Brendan Gan
DF	12	(Australia) Shannon Cole			(substituted on) 75'
FW	31	(Australia) Joey Gibbs			(substituted on) 116'
Manager:
(Czech Republic) Vitezslav Lavicka

== Players ==
=== Squad ===
Note: Flags indicate national team as defined under FIFA eligibility rules; some limited exceptions apply. Players may hold more than one non-FIFA nationality.

No.	Pos.	Nation	Player
1	GK	AUS	Clint Bolton
2	DF	AUS	Sebastian Ryall
3	DF	SUI	Stephan Keller
4	DF	AUS	Simon Colosimo
5	DF	AUS	Hayden Foxe
6	MF	SVK	Karol Kisel
7	MF	AUS	Brendan Gan
8	MF	AUS	Stuart Musialik
9	FW	AUS	John Aloisi (Marquee)
10	MF	AUS	Steve Corica (Captain)
11	MF	AUS	Kofi Danning (Youth)
12	MF	AUS	Shannon Cole
13	DF	AUS	Antony Golec (Youth)
14	FW	AUS	Alex Brosque

No.	Pos.	Nation	Player
15	MF	NIR	Terry McFlynn
16	FW	AUS	Chris Payne (Youth)
17	DF	AUS	Matthew Jurman (Youth)
18	MF	AUS	Adam Casey
19	FW	AUS	Mark Bridge (Junior Marquee)
20	GK	AUS	Ivan Necevski
22	DF	KOR	Byun Sung-Hwan
23	MF	AUS	Rhyan Grant (Youth)
27	DF	AUS	Sam Gallagher (Injury replacement player**)
28	MF	AUS	Sam Munro
29	MF	PHI	Iain Ramsay
31	FW	AUS	Joey Gibbs
—	MF	AUS	Mitchell Prentice

- ** Injury replacement player for Matthew Jurman.

=== Injury list ===
Player	Injury	Set date to return
(Australia) Kofi Danning	Anterior cruciate ligament injury	Next season
(Australia) Matthew Jurman	Foot Injury	End of season
(Australia) Steve Corica	Hamstring tear/Retirement	Retirement
(Australia) Rhyan Grant	Ankle Injury	End of season
(Australia) Adam Casey	Hamstring Injury	Indefinite

=== Transfers ===
Out

Player	To	League	Fee
(Australia) Iain Fyfe	Adelaide United	(Australia) A-League	Free
(Australia) Brendon Santalab	North Queensland	(Australia) A-League	Free
(Australia) Robbie Middleby	North Queensland	(Australia) A-League	Free
(Australia) Jacob Timpano	North Queensland	(Australia) A-League	Free
(Australia) Beau Busch	North Queensland	(Australia) A-League	Free
(Australia) Nikolas Tsattalios	Newcastle	(Australia) A-League	Free
(Australia) Ryan Walsh	Blacktown City	(Australia) NSWPL	Loan spell ended
(Australia) Dez Giraldi	Wollongong FC	(Australia) NSWPL	Loan spell ended
(Australia) Adam Biddle	Released	-	Released
(Netherlands) Bobby Petta	Released	-	Released
(United States) Michael Enfield	Released	-	Released

In

Player	From	League	Fee
(Australia) Sebastian Ryall	(Australia) Melbourne Victory	(Australia) A-League	Free
(Slovakia) Karol Kisel	(Czech Republic) AC Sparta Prague	(Czech Republic) Gambrinus Liga	Free
(South Korea) Byun Sung-Hwan	(South Korea) Jeju United FC	(South Korea) K-League	Free
(Switzerland) Stephan Keller	(Netherlands) De Graafschap	(Netherlands) Eredivisie	Free

=== January transfer window transfers ===
In

Player	From	League	Fee
(Australia) Hayden Foxe	Free agent		Injury cover for Matthew Jurman
(Australia) Sam Gallagher	Youth squad	NYL	Injury cover for Sebastian Ryall

Out

Player	To	League	Fee
(Australia) Mitchell Prentice	released		

== Statistics ==
=== Squad statistics ===
N	Pos.	Nat.	Name	Total					A-League					A-League Finals
N	Pos.	Nat.	Name	Apps	Goals	Yellow card	Second yellow card	Red card	Apps	Goals	Yellow card	Second yellow card	Red card	Apps	Goals	Yellow card	Second yellow card	Red card
1	GK	(Australia)	Clint Bolton	31	0	1	0	0	27	0	1	0	0	4	0	0	0	0
2	DF	(Australia)	Sebastian Ryall	18	0	3	0	0	10+5	0	2	0	0	3	0	1	0	0
3	DF	(Switzerland)	Stephan Keller	25	0	3	0	0	20+1	0	2	0	0	4	0	1	0	0
4	DF	(Australia)	Simon Colosimo	29	0	10	0	1	25	0	8	0	1	4	0	2	0	0
5	DF	(Australia)	Hayden Foxe	9	0	1	0	0	0+6	0	0	0	0	0+3	0	1	0	0
6	MF	(Slovakia)	Karol Kisel	29	3	4	0	0	25	2	3	0	0	4	1	1	0	0
7	MF	(Australia)	Brendan Gan	22	1	2	0	0	6+13	1	1	0	0	1+2	0	1	0	0
8	MF	(Australia)	Stuart Musialik	25	1	4	0	0	21	1	3	0	0	4	0	1	0	0
9	FW	(Australia)	John Aloisi	24	10	0	0	0	13+8	9	0	0	0	3	1	0	0	0
10	MF	(Australia)	Steve Corica	26	7	2	0	0	23+3	7	2	0	0	0	0	0	0	0
11	FW	(Australia)	Kofi Danning	7	1	0	0	0	4+3	1	0	0	0	0	0	0	0	0
12	MF	(Australia)	Shannon Cole	29	0	4	0	0	25+2	0	4	0	0	1+1	0	0	0	0
13	DF	(Australia)	Antony Golec	3	0	0	0	0	1+2	0	0	0	0	0	0	0	0	0
14	FW	(Australia)	Alex Brosque	29	7	4	0	0	25	6	3	0	0	4	1	1	0	0
15	MF	(Australia)	Terry McFlynn	27	1	4	0	0	23	1	3	0	0	4	0	1	0	0
16	FW	(Australia)	Chris Payne	14	3	1	0	0	1+9	1	0	0	0	1+3	2	1	0	0
17	DF	(Australia)	Matthew Jurman	7	0	0	0	0	0+7	0	0	0	0	0	0	0	0	0
18	MF	(Australia)	Adam Casey	3	0	0	0	0	1+2	0	0	0	0	0	0	0	0	0
19	FW	(Australia)	Mark Bridge	23	9	2	0	0	17+3	6	1	0	0	3	3	1	0	0
20	GK	(Australia)	Ivan Necevski	0	0	0	0	0	0	0	0	0	0	0	0	0	0	0
22	DF	(South Korea)	Byun Sung-Hwan	31	0	4	0	0	27	0	4	0	0	4	0	0	0	0
23	MF	(Australia)	Rhyan Grant	9	0	1	0	0	3+6	0	1	0	0	0	0	0	0	0
27	DF	(Australia)	Sam Gallagher	0	0	0	0	0	0	0	0	0	0	0	0	0	0	0
28	MF	(Australia)	Sam Munro	0	0	0	0	0	0	0	0	0	0	0	0	0	0	0
29	FW	(Philippines)	Iain Ramsay	1	0	0	0	0	0	0	0	0	0	0+1	0	0	0	0
31	FW	(Australia)	Joey Gibbs	1	0	0	0	0	0	0	0	0	0	0+1	0	0	0	0
Players no longer at the club:
5	DF	(Australia)	Mitchell Prentice	0	0	0	0	0	0	0	0	0	0	0	0	0	0	0

- Last updated: 4 July 2015
- Source: aus.worldfootball.net
- (yellow card) = Number of bookings; (second yellow card) = Number of sending offs after a second yellow card; (red card) = Number of sending offs by a direct red card.

=== Leading goalscorers ===
Rank	Player		Goals per Round																											Total
Rank	Player		1	2	3	4	5	6	7	8	9	10	11	12	13	14	15	16	17	18	19	20	21	22	23	24	25	26	27	Total
1	(Australia)	John Aloisi	2			1							1						1							1		2	1	9
2	(Australia)	Steve Corica					1		1						1				1	1			1					1		7
3	(Australia)	Mark Bridge		1					1			2			2															6
3	(Australia)	Alex Brosque										1		1				1	2		1									6
4	(Slovakia)	Karol Kisel												1															1	2
5	(Australia)	Kofi Danning	1																											1
5	(Australia)	Brendan Gan				1																								1
5	(Northern Ireland)	Terry McFlynn									1																			1
5	(Australia)	Stuart Musialik																								1				1
5	(Australia)	Chris Payne																								1				1

1 goal was scored from a penalty kick 2 goals were scored from penalty kicks

(Current as of Round 27)

== Pre-season and friendlies ==
28 February 2009; 20:00 UTC+10	Shanghai Shenhua (China)	2 – 1	(Australia) Sydney FC	Hongkou Stadium
	Barcos 32'; Lei 88'	Report	Brosque 58'	Attendance: 10,000

May

13 May 2009; 19:30	Macarthur Rams (Australia)	0 – 1	(Australia) Sydney FC	Lynwood Park
		Report	Gan 10'	Attendance: 3,350

20 May 2009; 19:30	Bankstown City Lions Football Club (Australia)	0 – 2	(Australia) Sydney FC	Jensen Oval
		Report	Payne 18'; Brosque 55'	Attendance: 2,500

27 May 2009; 19:30	Sydney Tigers (Australia)	0 – 3	(Australia) Sydney FC	Lambert Park (Leichhardt)
		Report	Brosque 2', 5', 8'	Attendance: 3,300

June

3 June 2009; 19:30	Northern Tigers FC (Australia)	0 – 3	(Australia) Sydney FC	Mills Park
		Report	McFlynn 25'; Aloisi 35'; Latronico 73'	Attendance: 2,000

9 June 2009; 19:00	Penrith Nepean United (Australia)	0 – 2	(Australia) Sydney FC	CUA Stadium
		Report	McFlynn 28'; Corica 75'	Attendance: 4,000

16 June 2009; 19:00	Manly United (Australia)	0 – 4	(Australia) Sydney FC	Cromer Park
		Report	Byun Sung-Hwan 20'; Payne 60'; Gan 63'; Cole 75'	Attendance: 1,500

23 June 2009; 19:30	Sydney United (Australia)	0 – 1	(Australia) Sydney FC	Sydney United Sports Centre
		Report	Grant 89'	Attendance: 2,500

27 June 2009; 19:00	Sydney FC (Australia)	4 – 0	(Australia) North Queensland Fury	Shark Park, Cronulla
	Corica 7'; Gan 47'; Danning 73'; McFlynn 87'	Report		Attendance: 5,283; Referee: Kris Griffiths-Jones

July

1 July 2009; 19:30	Sutherland Sharks (Australia)	1 – 4	(Australia) Sydney FC	Seymour Shaw Park
	Villazon 90'	Report	Payne 19'; Gan 35'; Bulut 53'; Trefiro 80'	Attendance: 2,300; Referee: Gerard Parsons

6 July 2009	Central Coast Mariners (Australia)	0 – 0	(Australia) Sydney FC	Leichhardt Oval
		Report		Attendance: 1,540; Referee: Stuart Wolfe

12 July 2009	Newcastle Jets (Australia)	0 – 2	(Australia) Sydney FC	Port Macquarie Regional Stadium
		Report	Aloisi 6', 53'	Attendance: 3,120

19 July 2009	Sydney Olympic (Australia)	0 – 1	(Australia) Sydney FC	Belmore Oval
		Report	Danning 28'	Attendance: 5,500; Referee: Kris Griffith-Jones.

26 July 2009	Sydney FC (Australia)	1 – 1	(Australia) Newcastle Jets	Sydney Football Stadium
	Brosque 28'	Report	Song 73'	Referee: Gerard Parsons

== Competitions ==
=== A-League ===
==== League table ====
Pos	Team	Pld	W	D	L	GF	GA	GD	Pts	Qualification
1	Sydney FC (C)	27	15	3	9	35	23	+12	48	Qualification for 2011 AFC Champions League group stage and Finals series
2	Melbourne Victory	27	14	5	8	47	32	+15	47	Qualification for 2011 AFC Champions League group stage and Finals series
3	Gold Coast United	27	13	5	9	39	35	+4	44	Qualification for Finals series
4	Wellington Phoenix	27	10	10	7	37	29	+8	40	Qualification for Finals series
5	Perth Glory	27	11	6	10	40	34	+6	39	Qualification for Finals series
6	Newcastle Jets	27	10	4	13	33	45	−12	34	Qualification for Finals series
7	North Queensland Fury	27	8	8	11	29	46	−17	32	
8	Central Coast Mariners	27	7	9	11	32	29	+3	30	
9	Brisbane Roar	27	8	6	13	32	42	−10	30	
10	Adelaide United	27	7	8	12	24	33	−9	29	

Source: ultimatealeague.com
Rules for classification: 1) points; 2) goal difference; 3) number of goals scored.
(C) Champions

==== Results summary ====
Overall								Home						Away					
Pld	W	D	L	GF	GA	GD	Pts	W	D	L	GF	GA	GD	W	D	L	GF	GA	GD
27	15	3	9	35	23	+12	48	11	0	3	23	11	+12	4	3	6	12	12	0

==== Results by round ====
Round	1	2	3	4	5	6	7	8	9	10	11	12	13	14	15	16	17	18	19	20	21	22	23	24	25	26	27
Ground	A	H	A	H	A	H	H	A	H	A	A	H	H	A	A	H	H	A	H	A	H	A	H	A	A	H	H
Result	W	W	D	W	L	L	W	L	W	W	L	W	W	L	L	L	W	W	D	W	W	D	L	W	L	W	W
Position	2	1	2	1	2	2	1	3	1	1	2	1	1	1	2	2	2	2	2	2	1	1	3	2	3	2	1

Source: Football-lineups.com
A = Away; H = Home; W = Win; D = Draw; L = Loss

==== Matches ====
August

8 August 2009	North Queensland Fury	2 – 3	Sydney FC	Dairy Farmers Stadium
	Griffiths 41'; Fowler 60' (pen.)	Report; Summary	Aloisi 4', 74' (pen.); Danning 28'	Attendance: 8,897; Referee: Srebre Delovski

16 August 2009	Sydney FC	1 – 0	Adelaide United	Sydney Football Stadium
	Colosimo (yellow card) 26'; Corica (yellow card) 35'; Cole (yellow card) 52'; McFlynn (yellow card) 64'; Bridge 77'	Report; Summary	(yellow card) 70' Jamieson	Attendance: 14,924; Referee: Matthew Breeze

22 August 2009	Central Coast Mariners	0 – 0	Sydney FC	Bluetongue Stadium
	(yellow card) 77' Hutchinson	Report; Summary	(yellow card) 29' Sung-Hwan; (yellow card) 78' Kisel	Attendance: 10,092; Referee: Srebre Delovski

30 August 2009	Sydney FC	2 – 0	Wellington Phoenix	Sydney Football Stadium
	Gan 77'; Aloisi 81'	Report; Summary	(yellow card) 22' Ifill	Attendance: 11,718; Referee: Srebre Delovski

September

5 September 2009	Gold Coast United	2 – 1	Sydney FC	Skilled Park
	Smeltz 45+1', 56'; Robson (yellow card) 7'	Report; Summary	Corica 75'	Attendance: 6,406; Referee: Srebre Delovski

12 September 2009	Sydney FC	0 – 1	North Queensland Fury	Sydney Football Stadium
	Grant (yellow card) 34'; Sung-Hwan (yellow card) 89'	Report; Summary	(yellow card) 25' Henderson; Fowler 53'	Attendance: 16,699; Referee: Ben Williams

20 September 2009	Sydney FC	2 – 1	Newcastle Jets	Sydney Football Stadium
	Bridge 26'; Corica 55' (pen.); Sung-Hwan (yellow card) 90'	Report; Summary	Thompson 37'; (yellow card) 70' Petrovski; (yellow card) 54' Kennedy; (red card) 89' Elrich; (yellow card) 90' Costanzo	Attendance: 10,357; Referee: Ben Williams

27 September 2009	Brisbane Roar	1 – 0	Sydney FC	Suncorp Stadium
	Moore (yellow card) 43'; D. Dodd (yellow card) 70'; Miller (yellow card) 74' van Dijk 85'	Report; Summary	(yellow card) 39' Gan; (yellow card) 76' Cole; (yellow card) 83' Ryall	Attendance: 7,677; Referee: Srebre Delovski

October

5 October 2009; 15:00 UTC+11	Sydney FC	1 – 0	Central Coast Mariners	Sydney Football Stadium
	McFlynn 20'	Report; Summary		Attendance: 13,887; Referee: Matthew Breeze

9 October 2009	Melbourne Victory	0 – 3	Sydney FC	Etihad Stadium
		Report; Summary	Brosque 14'; Bridge 16', 19'; (yellow card) 40' Colosimo	Attendance: 30,688; Referee: Peter Green

16 October 2009	Adelaide United	2 – 1	Sydney FC	Hindmarsh Stadium
	Barbiero (red card) 8'; Cristiano 29' 54'; Galekovic (yellow card) 75'; Hughes (yellow card) 87'; Jamieson (yellow card) 90+1'	Report; Summary	Aloisi 78'; Brosque (yellow card) 86'	Attendance: 10,291; Referee: Srebre Delovski

25 October 2009	Sydney FC	2 – 1	Queensland Roar	Sydney Football Stadium
	Brosque 55'; Kisel 69'; Byun (yellow card) 90+5'	Report; Summary	Cernak 73'; Packer (yellow card) 77'	Attendance: 8,456; Referee: Matthew Breeze

November

1 November 2009	Sydney FC	3 – 1	Wellington Phoenix	Sydney Football Stadium
	Bridge 15', 35'; Corica (yellow card) 30'; Corica 31'; Cole (yellow card) 60'; Kisel (yellow card) 71'; Musialik (yellow card) 90+3'	Report; Summary	Lia (yellow card) 38'; Barbarouses 81'	Attendance: 10,653; Referee: Gerard Parsons

7 November 2009	Gold Coast United	1 – 0	Sydney FC	Skilled Park
	Shane Smeltz 36'; Culina (yellow card) 38'; Pantelidis (yellow card) 88'	Report; Summary	McFlynn (yellow card) 24'; Cole (yellow card) 25'; Musialik (yellow card) 38'	Attendance: 5,364; Referee: Ben Williams

22 November 2009	Perth Glory	2 – 0	Sydney FC	Subiaco Oval
	Bulloch 57'; Sikora (yellow card) 69'; Jelic 88'	Report; Summary	Ryall (yellow card) 47'; Colosimo (yellow card) 66'	Attendance: 8,932; Referee: Strebre Delovski

29 November 2009	Sydney FC	1 – 3	Newcastle Jets	Sydney Football Stadium
	Brosque 75'	Report; Summary	Song (yellow card) 1'; Bridges (pen.), 24', 50'; Thompson 58'; Kantarovski (yellow card) 73'	Attendance: 10,114; Referee: Strebre Delovski

December

5 December 2009	Sydney FC	4 – 1	North Queensland Fury	Sydney Football Stadium
	Aloisi 14'; Brosque 19', 55'; Corica 62'; Colosimo (yellow card) 66'	Report; Summary	Griffiths (yellow card) 19'; Smith (yellow card) 54'; Griffiths 58'	Attendance: 11,871; Referee: Ben Williams

12 December 2009	Wellington Phoenix	0 – 1	Sydney FC	FMG Stadium
	McKain (yellow card) 15'; Lia (yellow card) 34'; Daniel (yellow card) 90+1'	Report; Summary	Corica (pen.), 16'; Corica (yellow card) 71'; Brosque (yellow card) 78'; Colosimo (red card) 80'; Bolton (yellow card) 84'	Attendance: 6,936; Referee: Michael Hester

23 December 2009	Sydney FC	1 – 0	Central Coast Mariners	Sydney Football Stadium
	Brosque 34'	Report; Summary	Crowell (yellow card) 35'; Wilkinson (yellow card) 53'; Boogaard (yellow card) 57'; Macallister (yellow card) 86'	Attendance: 12,689; Referee: Matthew Breeze

19 December 2009	Melbourne Victory	0 – 0	Sydney FC	Etihad Stadium
	Broxham (yellow card) 43'	Report; Summary	McFlynn (yellow card) 25'; Musialik (yellow card) 58'	Attendance: 27,344; Referee: Strebre Delovski

27 December 2009	Sydney FC	1 – 0	Adelaide United	Sydney Football Stadium
	Corica 49'; Colosimo (yellow card) 53'; Brosque (yellow card) 86'	Report; Summary		Attendance: 11,741; Referee: Chris Beath

January

10 January 2010	Perth Glory	0 – 0	Sydney FC	Members Equity Stadium
	Coyne (yellow card) 57'	Report; Summary		Attendance: 9,319; Referee: Strebre Delovski

17 January 2010	Sydney FC	0 – 1	Gold Coast United	Sydney Football Stadium
	Colosimo (yellow card) 26'; Bridge (yellow card) 55'	Report; Summary	Porter 19'; Brown (yellow card) 70'; Fitzsimmons (yellow card) 87'; Culina (yellow card) 90+5'	Attendance: 14,941; Referee: Ben Williams

24 January 2010	Newcastle Jets	1 – 3	Sydney FC	EnergyAustralia Stadium
	Wheelhouse 33'; D'Apuzzo (yellow card) 40'	Report; Summary	Aloisi 45+1'; Musialik 50'; Keller (yellow card) 70'; Payne 90+4'	Attendance: 9,892; Referee: Peter Green

30 January 2010	Brisbane Roar	1 – 0	Sydney FC	Suncorp Stadium
	Zullo (yellow card) 55' van Dijk 89'	Report; Summary	Keller (yellow card) 46'; Cole (yellow card) 50'; Colosimo (yellow card) 90+3'	Attendance: 8,613; Referee: Michael Hester

February

7 February 2010	Sydney FC	3 – 2	Perth Glory	Parramatta Stadium
	Corica 24' (pen.); Aloisi 48', 87' (pen.)	Report; Summary	McGarry (yellow card) 40'; Srhoj 45+3'; Vrteski (yellow card) 49'; McBreen (yellow card) 65' (goal) 79'	Attendance: 8,359; Referee: Chris Beath

14 February 2010	Sydney FC	2 – 0	Melbourne Victory	Sydney Football Stadium
	Kisel (yellow card) 28'; Kisel 34'; Aloisi 49'	[Report] Summary	Brebner (yellow card) 26'; Leigh (yellow card) 48'; Leijer (yellow card) 63'	Attendance: 25,407; Referee: Matthew Breeze

Finals

19 February 2010 (Leg 1)	Melbourne Victory	2 – 1	Sydney FC	Etihad Stadium
	Nick Mrdja 16'; Carlos Hernandez 40'; Nick Mrdja (red card) 73'	Report	John Aloisi 43'	Attendance: 18,453; Referee: Peter Green

7 March 2010; 17:00 UTC+11 (Leg 2)	Sydney FC	2 – 2 (AET)	Melbourne Victory	Sydney Football Stadium
	Kisel 36' (pen.); Bridge 54'	3-4 on aggregate Report; Summary	Kruse 15'; A. Thompson 113'	Attendance: 23,818; Referee: Strebre Delovski

13 March 2010; 20:30 UTC+11	Sydney FC	4 – 2	Wellington Phoenix	Sydney Football Stadium
	Payne 21', 31'; Brosque 63'; Bridge 71'	Report; Summary	Durante 27'; Dadi 81'	Attendance: 13,196; Referee: Peter Green

20 March 2010; 19:00 UTC+11	Melbourne Victory	1 – 1 (a.e.t.) (2 – 4 p)	Sydney FC	Etihad Stadium, Melbourne
	Leijer 81'	Report; Summary	Bridge 63'	Attendance: 44,560; Referee: Strebre Delovski
	Penalties
	Muscat (penalty missed); Brebner (penalty scored); Angulo (penalty missed); Broxham (penalty scored)		(penalty scored) Colosimo; (penalty missed) Cole; (penalty scored) Foxe; (penalty scored) Kisel; (penalty scored) Byun

== Stadiums ==
Sydney FC played 13 home games at the Sydney Football Stadium and 1 game at Parramatta Stadium.

The reason for the match against Perth Glory being moved from the SFS to Parramatta Stadium was due to a scheduling conflict with the Edinburgh Military Tattoo. Sydney have played at the western Sydney stadium before when they moved their venue of the AFC Champions League group match against Persik Kediri to Parramatta due to the annual Anzac Day NRL match between the Sydney Roosters and St. George Illawarra Dragons.

Stadium	Capacity
Sydney Football Stadium	45,500
Parramatta Stadium	20,857

Other venues that Sydney FC will play away from home are:

Stadium	Capacity
Bluetongue Stadium	20,059
Dairy Farmers Stadium	26,500
Energy Australia Stadium	26,000
Etihad Stadium	56,437
FMG Stadium	18,000
Hindmarsh Stadium	15,600
Members Equity Stadium	18,156
Skilled Park	27,400
Suncorp Stadium	52,500
Westpac Stadium	26,500

== International Selections ==
2011 AFC Asian Cup qualification

The following players from Sydney FC were chosen to represent their country in the 2011 AFC Asian Cup qualification for the 2011 Asian Cup:

- (Australia) Alex Brosque (v. Oman, Kuwait, Indonesia)
- (Australia) Simon Colosimo (v. Kuwait, Indonesia)
- (Australia) Clint Bolton (v. Indonesia)
- (Australia) Shannon Cole (v. Indonesia)
- (Australia) Stuart Musialik (v. Indonesia)

2009 FIFA U-20 World Cup

The following players from Sydney FC were chosen to represent their country in the 2009 FIFA U-20 World Cup in Egypt:

- (Australia) Kofi Danning
- (Australia) Rhyan Grant
- (Australia) Matthew Jurman
- (Australia) Sam Munro
- (Australia) Sam Gallagher

AFC U-19 Championship 2010 qualification

The following players from Sydney FC were chosen to represent their country in the AFC U-19 Championship 2010 qualification in Indonesia:

- (Australia) Rhyan Grant
- (Australia) Kofi Danning
- (Australia) Kerem Bulut
- (Australia) Dimitri Petratos
- (Australia) Sam Gallagher
