= 2010 A-League Grand Final =

- Event: 2009–10 A-League
Melbourne Victory	Sydney FC
1	1
- After extra time Sydney won 4–2 on penalties
- Date: 20 March 2010
- Venue: Etihad Stadium, Melbourne, Victoria, Australia
- Man of the Match: Simon Colosimo, Sydney FC
- Referee: Strebre Delovski
- Attendance: 44,560

The 2010 A-League Grand Final took place at Etihad Stadium in Melbourne, Australia on 20 March 2010.

It was the final match in the A-League 2009–10 season, and was played between premiers Sydney FC and runners-up Melbourne Victory. Sydney FC won the match 4–2 on penalty shootout after drawing the game 1–1 and became the winners of the 2009–10 Championship in addition to their premiership.

The A-League National Youth League Grand Final was held at Etihad Stadium prior to the main game. After coming 4th in the 2009–10 season, Gold Coast United won the youth title in their inaugural season, coming from a goal down to defeat Perth Glory, 2–1.

== Route to the final ==
Elimination finals
3	Gold Coast United	0 (5)
6	Newcastle Jets (p.s.o.)	0 (6)
4	Wellington Phoenix (p.s.o.)	1 (4)
5	Perth Glory	1 (2)

Semifinals
1	Sydney FC	1	2
2	Melbourne Victory	2	2
Wellington Phoenix	3
Newcastle Jets	1

Preliminary final
Sydney FC	4
Wellington Phoenix	2

Grand final
Melbourne Victory	1 (2)
Sydney FC (p.s.o.)	1 (4)

== Match ==
=== Summary ===
An early knee injury forced key striker Archie Thompson, who scored 5 goals in the 2007 A-League Grand Final, off the field in the sixteenth minute. He was replaced by Costa Rican Marvin Angulo.

With both teams struggling to break the deadlock, Melbourne were left stunned when Mark Bridge scored a goal in the 63rd minute after a deflected cross. To add to Melbourne's misfortune, it was scored less than a minute after Rodrigo Vargas' headed goal was correctly disallowed by the assistant referee for offside.

Melbourne were able to find an equaliser through Adrian Leijer after Kevin Muscat delivered a set piece. Leijer's late header resulted in some frantic final minutes, but neither team were able to find the breakthrough goal in normal time. Extra time resulted in few opportunities and the game was decided by penalties for the first time in A-League history.

=== Details ===
20 March 2010
19:00 UTC+11

Melbourne Victory	1–1 (a.e.t.)	Sydney FC
Leijer 81'	Reports	Bridge 63'
Penalties
Muscat (penalty missed); Brebner (penalty scored); Angulo (penalty missed); Broxham (penalty scored)	2–4	(penalty scored) Colosimo; (penalty missed) Cole; (penalty scored) Foxe; (penalty scored) Kisel; (penalty scored) Byun

Etihad Stadium, Melbourne
Attendance: 44,560
Referee: Strebre Delovski

Melbourne Victory	Sydney FC

GK	1	(Australia) Mitchell Langerak
DF	2	(Australia) Kevin Muscat (c)		(yellow card) 62'
DF	5	(Thailand) Surat Sukha			(substituted off) 71'
MF	6	(Australia) Leigh Broxham
MF	8	(Scotland) Grant Brebner
FW	10	(Australia) Archie Thompson			(substituted off) 16'
DF	12	(Australia) Rodrigo Vargas
MF	16	(Costa Rica) Carlos Hernández
FW	21	(Australia) Robbie Kruse
MF	22	(Australia) Nick Ward			(substituted off) 76'
DF	23	(Australia) Adrian Leijer	81'
Substitutes:
GK	20	(New Zealand) Glen Moss
MF	11	(Costa Rica) Marvin Angulo			(substituted on) 16'
DF	17	(Australia) Matthew Foschini
DF	19	(Australia) Evan Berger		(yellow card) 100'	(substituted on) 71'
FW	25	(Australia) Aziz Behich			(substituted on) 76'
Manager:
(Scotland) Ernie Merrick

GK	1	(Australia) Clint Bolton
DF	2	(Australia) Sebastian Ryall		(yellow card) 26'
DF	3	(Switzerland) Stephan Keller
DF	4	(Australia) Simon Colosimo		(yellow card) 51'
MF	6	(Slovakia) Karol Kisel		(yellow card) 84'
MF	8	(Australia) Stuart Musialik			(substituted off) 105'
FW	14	(Australia) Alex Brosque			(substituted off) 116'
MF	15	(Northern Ireland) Terry McFlynn (c)
FW	16	(Australia) Chris Payne			(substituted off) 75'
FW	19	(Australia) Mark Bridge	63'	(yellow card) 31'
DF	22	(South Korea) Byun Sung-Hwan
Substitutes:
GK	20	(Australia) Ivan Necevski
DF	5	(Australia) Hayden Foxe			(substituted on) 105'
MF	7	(Australia) Brendan Gan
DF	12	(Australia) Shannon Cole			(substituted on) 75'
FW	31	(Australia) Joey Gibbs			(substituted on) 116'
Manager:
(Czech Republic) Vitezslav Lavicka

Joe Marston Medal:
Simon Colosimo (Sydney FC)

Assistant referees:
Ben Wilson
Matthew Cream
Fourth official:
Matthew Breeze

Match rules

- 90 minutes
- 30 minutes of extra time if necessary.
- Penalty shoot-out if scores still level.

=== Statistics ===
	Melbourne	Sydney
Attempts at goal	14	12
Attempts on target	6	6
Attempts off target	7	6
Attempts - woodwork	1	0
Keeper saves	3	4
Ball possession	51%	49%
Corners	8	5
Fouls committed	13	16
Offsides	3	3
Yellow cards	2	4
Red cards	0	0

== See also ==
- 2009–10 A-League
- List of A-League champions
