= Latronico (surname) =

Latronico is a surname. Notable people with the surname include:

- Gustavo Latronico (born 1984), Uruguayan football player
- Vincenzo Latronico (born 1984), Italian writer and translator
