= Terry McFlynn =

Northern Irish footballer

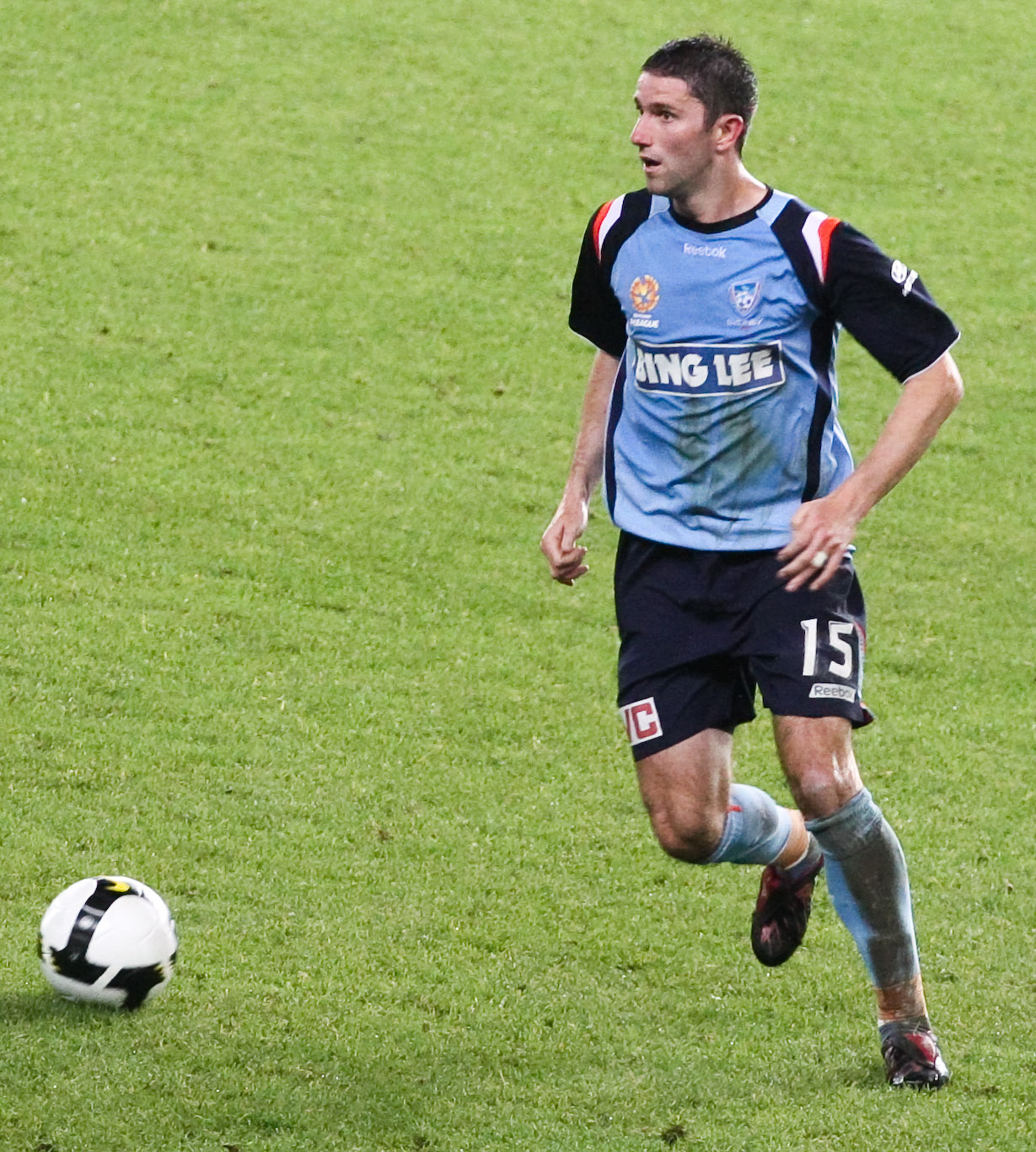
- McFlynn playing for Sydney FC in 2009

Personal information
- Full name: Terence Martin McFlynn
- Date of birth: 27 March 1981 (age 45)
- Place of birth: Magherafelt, Northern Ireland
- Height: 1.74 m (5 ft 9 in)
- Position: Central midfielder

Youth career
- Queens Park Rangers

Senior career*
Years	Team	Apps	(Gls)
1997–2001	Queens Park Rangers	2	(0)
2001	Woking	10	(1)
2001–2003	Margate	63	(8)
2003–2005	Morecambe	35	(5)
2005–2014	Sydney FC	214	(7)
2014	Bonnyrigg White Eagles	11	(0)
Total		294	(20)

International career^{‡}
1998–2000	Northern Ireland U-19	12	(2)
2001	Northern Ireland U-21	3	(0)
- * Club domestic league appearances and goals as of 26 January 2014 ‡ National team caps and goals as of 17 February 2013

Terence Martin "Terry" McFlynn (born 27 March 1981) is a retired footballer from Northern Ireland who is most well known for playing for the A-League club Sydney FC. He is the director of football for A-League expansion club Auckland FC.

== Early life ==
McFlynn grew up in Swatragh, in Northern Ireland to a Catholic family. He played Gaelic Football for the first sixteen years of his life, one of Ireland's traditional sports, before he switched to football on advice from his uncle.

== Club career ==
McFlynn began his footballing career in England as an apprentice at Queens Park Rangers in 1996. McFlynn made only two first-team appearances in his five-year stay at the club – his first-team debut was made on 28 April 2001. He was released in 2001 and signed for Woking. McFlynn made 10 appearances for the West Surrey club scoring only once, in a short half-year deal.

McFlynn moved to Margate, initially on a one-month loan deal, but ended up being a useful three-year career, in November 2001. McFlynn quickly became a huge favourite with the Margate fans, helped by a stunning debut goal against Boston United. He made 63 appearances for the club and scoring a total of 11 goals. A hamstring injury late in 2002 saw McFlynn miss several key games and as a result was sold to Morecambe.

In 2003, McFlynn moved to Conference rivals Morecambe for £14,000 and, despite scoring on debut, he was unable to cement a spot in the team and was released in 2005, but made 35 appearances and scoring five goals in just 17 games.

=== Sydney FC ===
Following the advice of former teammate and one-time New Zealand captain Chris Zoricich, McFlynn moved to Australia to play in the newly formed A-League and was signed by Sydney FC manager Pierre Littbarski after a successful trial in February 2005.

In his first season with Sydney FC, McFlynn made 21 appearances and proved to be a strong and determined player. He scored a memorable first goal for the club in round five of the 2005–06 season against the Queensland Roar in which he lobbed their goalkeeper, Tom Willis, from 30 meters out to round off a 3–1 victory to Sydney FC.

Sydney FC progressed to the inaugural A-League Grand Final, which was played at the Sydney Football Stadium on 5 March 2006. McFlynn played the full 90 minutes as Sydney FC defeated the Central Coast Mariners 1–0 in front of 41,689 spectators to become the inaugural A-League champions.

He failed to make an impact on the 2006–07 A-League season when he picked up a hamstring injury and as a result, only making 13 appearances, without scoring.

In the 2007–08 season he scored two more goals. One against Central Coast Mariners, in Sydney's 5–4 win and against Wellington Phoenix which Sydney won 2–0. Both of these goals were in the latter half of the season.

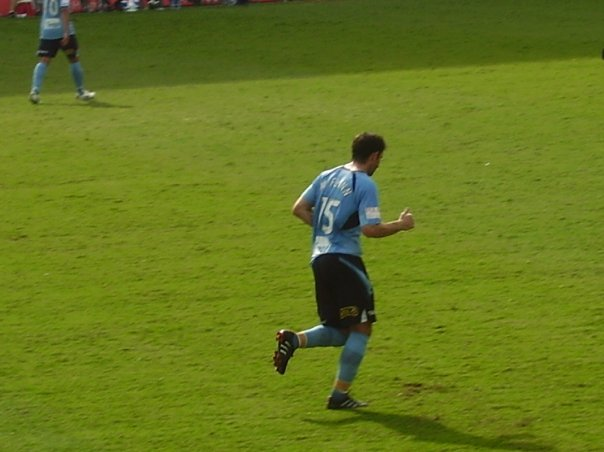
Terry McFlynn in action for Sydney FC, 2010.

In February 2008 McFlynn signed a new contract with Sydney for a further two years. He scored his fourth goal in Sydney's fifth match in the A-League 2008-09, against Adelaide United in Sydney's 3–0 victory, with a volley from outside the box. Another goal for Sydney against F3 Freeway rivals Central Coast Mariners took his tally to five. In a match against Adelaide United at Hindmarsh Stadium in which he was given a straight red card he sustained five-week knee injury. However, he returned to the bench in the third game of the season against Adelaide United in their 2–0 loss at the Adelaide Oval. His sixth goal for the club came against rivals Central Coast Mariners, scoring the only goal in their 1–0 victory. Speaking after the game McFlynn said it was his most memorable, as his first child had been born the week before, not to mention it was his first game after returning from a thigh injury.

In November 2009, Sydney FC held a press conference to inform the public that they had re-signed McFlynn on a further three-year contract, up until 2013. This will mean by the end of this contract, McFlynn will have been with the club for eight years. McFlynn further commented saying

I don't want to play football for any other clubs, either in Australia or anywhere else," he said "I've been at Sydney FC for five years and I couldn't be happier to be signing on for another three years. "I have grown to love the club, my family is here and I see Sydney as my home."

On 26 February 2010 it was announced that he had received permanent Australian residency. McFlynn eventually gained Australian citizenship.

One of his greatest honours was standing in as captain for the Grand final as Steve Corica and John Aloisi were injured. He was officially awarded the captaincy for the 2010–11 season on 22 July.

His 100th A-League game for Sydney FC came in Round 3 of the A-League 2010-11 season, with Sydney losing 1–0 to Brisbane Roar at Suncorp Stadium.

McFlynn led Sydney FC into their first game of the AFC Champions League against K-League club Suwon Samsung Bluewings FC. However his role would end after just 32 minutes when he was sent off for stomping on Korean player Lee Sang-ho. After a two-match suspension, he returned to the senior team to help lead Sydney FC to a 3–2 victory over Shanghai Shenhua in Shanghai.

After captaining Sydney to the 2011–12 A-League finals, McFlynn made his 150th appearance in the semi-final against Wellington Phoenix at Westpac Stadium, although Wellington defeated Sydney 3–2 and knocked them out of the finals in the process.

On 6 April 2014, McFlynn announced he would leave Sydney FC and retire from A-League football.

=== Bonnyrigg White Eagles ===
McFlynn joined reigning NSW Premier League Champions Bonnyrigg White Eagles making his debut on 11 May 2014 in a round nine clash against Blacktown City Demons.

== Post-playing career ==
Before his retirement, McFlynn studied a Master's in coaching education at Sydney University, where upon retiring from football was offered a position in the Sydney FC coaching staff as general manager of player welfare under manager Graham Arnold.

After 14 years with Sydney FC as a player and backroom staff member, McFlynn announced he was moving to Perth, and signed with Perth Glory as director of academy operations under director of football Jacob Burns. The move was for family reasons with McFlynn also citing the belief of a new challenge.

McFlynn would stay at Perth Glory for four years, before he was announced as the new director of football for New Zealand A-League expansion club Auckland FC. McFlynn was instrumental in signing former Sydney FC teammate and manager Steve Corica as the inaugural manager of the club ahead of their debut 2024-2025 season.

== Club career statistics ==
Appearances and goals by club, season and competition
Club	Season	League			National Cup		League Cup		Continental		Other		Total	
Club	Season	Division	Apps	Goals	Apps	Goals	Apps	Goals	Apps	Goals	Apps	Goals	Apps	Goals
Queens Park Rangers	2000–01	First Division	2	0	0	0	0	0	–		–		2	0
Woking	2001–02	Conference	10	1	0	0	–		–		0	0	10	1
Margate	2001–02	Conference	21	3	0	0	–		–		1 (Note: Appearance(s) in FA Trophy)	0	22	3
Margate	2002–03	Conference	29	3	3	0	–		–		0	0	32	3
Margate	2003–04	Conference	11	2	0	0	–		–		0	0	11	2
Margate	Margate total		61	8	3	0	0	0	0	0	1	0	65	8
Morecambe	2003–04	Conference	19	3	0	0	–		–		0	0	19	3
Morecambe	2004–05	Conference	13	1	1	0	–		–		0	0	14	1
Morecambe	Morecambe total		32	4	1	0	0	0	0	0	0	0	33	4
Sydney FC	2005–06	A-League	21	1	–		4	0	4	0	5 (Note: 3 appearances in 2005 Australian Club World Championship Qualifying Tournament and 2 appearances in 2005 FIFA Club World Cup)	0	30	1
Sydney FC	2006–07	A-League	16	0	–		6	0	3	0	–		25	0
Sydney FC	2007–08	A-League	17	2	–		5	0	0	0	–		22	2
Sydney FC	2008–09	A-League	16	2	–		3	0	0	0	–		19	2
Sydney FC	2009–10	A-League	27	1	–		–		0	0	–		27	1
Sydney FC	2010–11	A-League	27	1	–		–		4	0	–		31	1
Sydney FC	2011–12	A-League	26	0	–		–		0	0	–		26	0
Sydney FC	2012–13	A-League	19	0	–		–		0	0	–		19	0
Sydney FC	2013–14	A-League	9	0	–		–		0	0	–		9	0
Sydney FC	Sydney total		178	7	0	0	18	0	11	0	5	0	212	7
Bonnyrigg White Eagles	2014	National Premier Leagues	11	0	0	0	0	0	–		0	0	11	0
Career total			294	20	4	0	18	0	11	0	6	0	322	20

== International career ==
McFlynn has played for the Northern Ireland Under-19 squad and the Northern Ireland Under-21 squad.

== Honours ==
With Sydney FC:

- A-League Premiership: 2009–2010
- A-League Championship: 2005–2006, 2009–2010
- Oceania Club Championship: 2004–2005
