= Byun Sung-hwan =

South Korean footballer

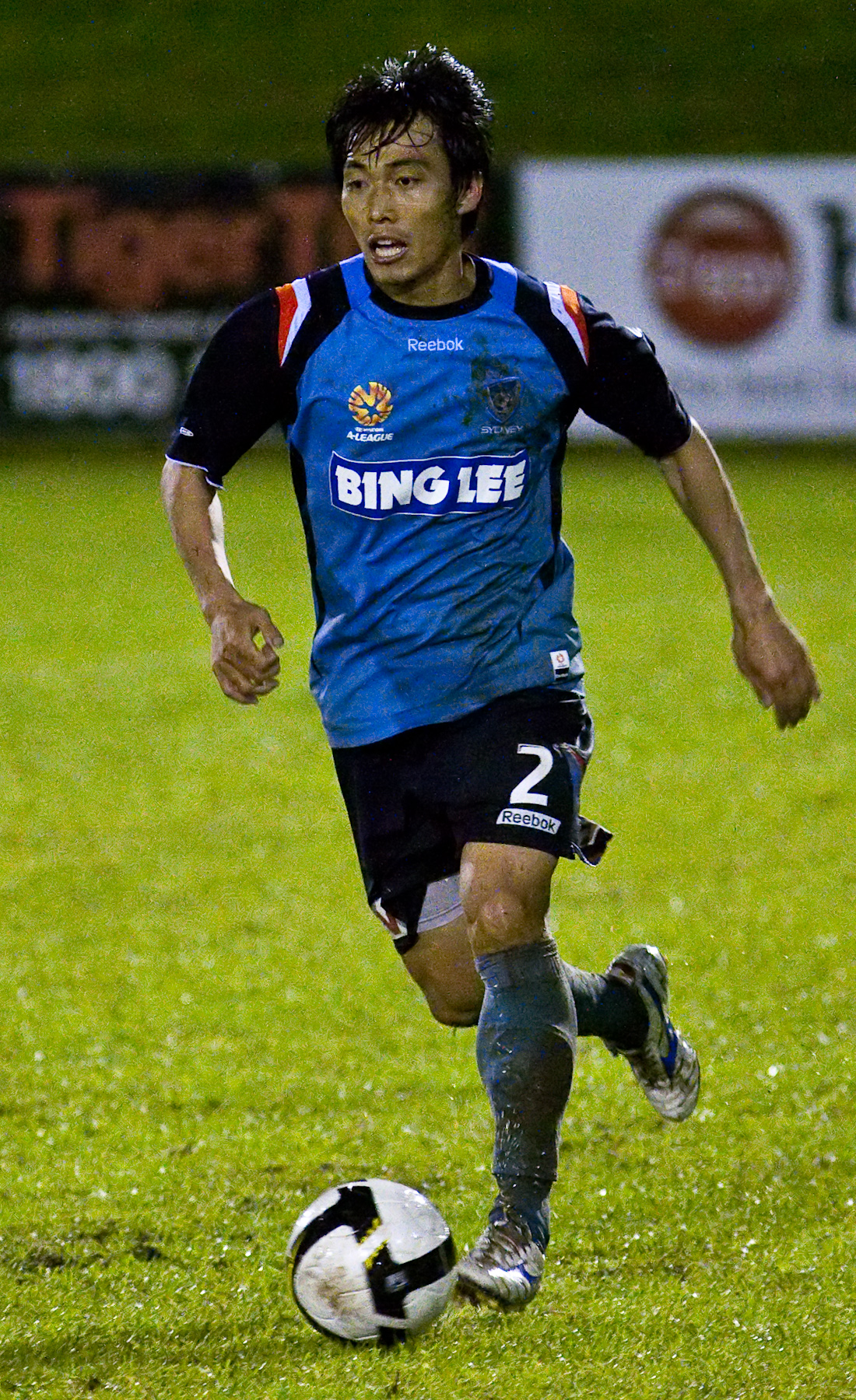

Personal information
- Date of birth: 22 December 1979 (age 46)
- Place of birth: Daegu, South Korea
- Height: 1.76 m (5 ft 9 in)
- Position: Full-back

Youth career
- 1995–1997: Gyeongnam Commercial High School
- 1998–2001: University of Ulsan

Senior career*
Years	Team	Apps	(Gls)
2002–2006	Ulsan Hyundai Horang-i	56	(0)
2007	Busan I'Park	16	(0)
2008	Jeju United	16	(0)
2009–2011	Sydney FC	57	(0)
2011–2012	Newcastle Jets	26	(2)
2012	Seongnam Ilhwa Chunma	5	(0)
2013–2014	FC Anyang	22	(0)

International career^{‡}
2002	South Korea U-23	1	(0)

Managerial career
- 2016: Seongnam FC (Caretaker)
- 2024–2025: Suwon Samsung Bluewings
Medal record
Men's football
Representing South Korea
Asian Games
Bronze medal – third place	2002 Busan	Team
Korean name
Hangul	변성환
Hanja	卞盛煥
RR	Byeon Seonghwan
MR	Pyŏn Sŏnghwan
- * Club domestic league appearances and goals as of 24 November 2014 ‡ National team caps and goals as of 17:30, 20 January 2010 (UTC)

Byun Sung-hwan (Korean: 변성환; Korean pronunciation: [pjʌn.sʌŋ.ɦwan]; born 22 December 1979) is a South Korean football manager and former player.

== Club career ==
=== Ulsan Hyundai ===
During 2002 to 2006 Byun made 56 appearances for Ulsan Hyundai.

=== Busan I'Park ===
Byun made 16 appearances for Busan I'Park during 2007.

=== Jeju United ===
During 2008 Byun made 16 appearances for Jeju United.

=== Sydney FC ===
After playing in pre-season trials with Sydney FC, where he scored a goal against Manly United, he was announced as a new signing on 25 June 2009 for the upcoming 2009–10 season, on a two-year contract. He became a crowd favourite amongst the Sydney fans. It is noted that he is a fast player – prior to 2005, he could run the 100m in 12.2 seconds. He is known for his attacking abilities and speed.

Byun scored the winning goal and his first professional goal, for Sydney FC in the penalty shoot out of the 2009/10 Grand final against Melbourne Victory. Sydney FC released Byun at the end of the 2010–11 A-League season, deciding not to extend his contract for the Asian Champions League.

=== Newcastle Jets ===
After being released by Sydney, Byun entered into negotiations with fellow A-League club Newcastle Jets. And on 11 April 2011 it was announced that Byun had signed a one-year contract with the Jets.

Byun scored on his A-League debut for the Jets, sealing a 3–2 victory over Melbourne Heart in Newcastle. This was Byun's first goal in open play, after 146 games in professional competition. In the Round 14 game against Melbourne Victory Byun scored two own goals to give the Victory a 2–1 win at AAMI Park. On 8 December 2011 the future of Byun was uncertain after routine medical tests revealed a potentially serious heart condition. The test revealed that he had a left ventricular hypertrophy (enlarged left ventricle).

== International career ==
Sung-Hwan has appeared for the South Korean U-23 team at the East Asian Games.

== Career statistics ==
Appearances and goals by club, season and competition
Club	Season	League		Cup		League Cup		Continental		Total	
Club	Season	Apps	Goals	App	Goals	App	Goals	App	Goals	App	Goals
Ulsan Hyundai	2002	15	0	2	0	10	0	—		27	0
Ulsan Hyundai	2003	14	0	3	0	—		—		17	0
Ulsan Hyundai	2004	6	0	0	0	9	0	—		15	0
Ulsan Hyundai	2005	0	0	0	0	5	0	—		5	0
Ulsan Hyundai	2006	21	0	1	0	6	0	8	1	36	1
Ulsan Hyundai	Total	56	0	6	0	30	0	8	1	100	1
Busan I'Park	2007	16	0	2	0	7	0	—		25	0
Jeju United	2008	16	0	0	0	9	1	—		25	1
Sydney FC	2009–10	31	0	—		—		—		31	0
Sydney FC	2010–11	21	0	—		—		—		21	0
Sydney FC	Total	52	0	0	0	0	0	0	0	52	0
Newcastle Jets	2011–12	26	2	—		—		—		26	2
Seongnam Ilhwa	2012	5	0	0	0	—		0	0	5	0
Career total		171	2	8	0	46	1	8	1	233	4

== Honours ==
Sydney FC

- A-League Premiership: 2009–10
- A-League Championship: 2009–10
