= Karol Kisel =

Slovak footballer

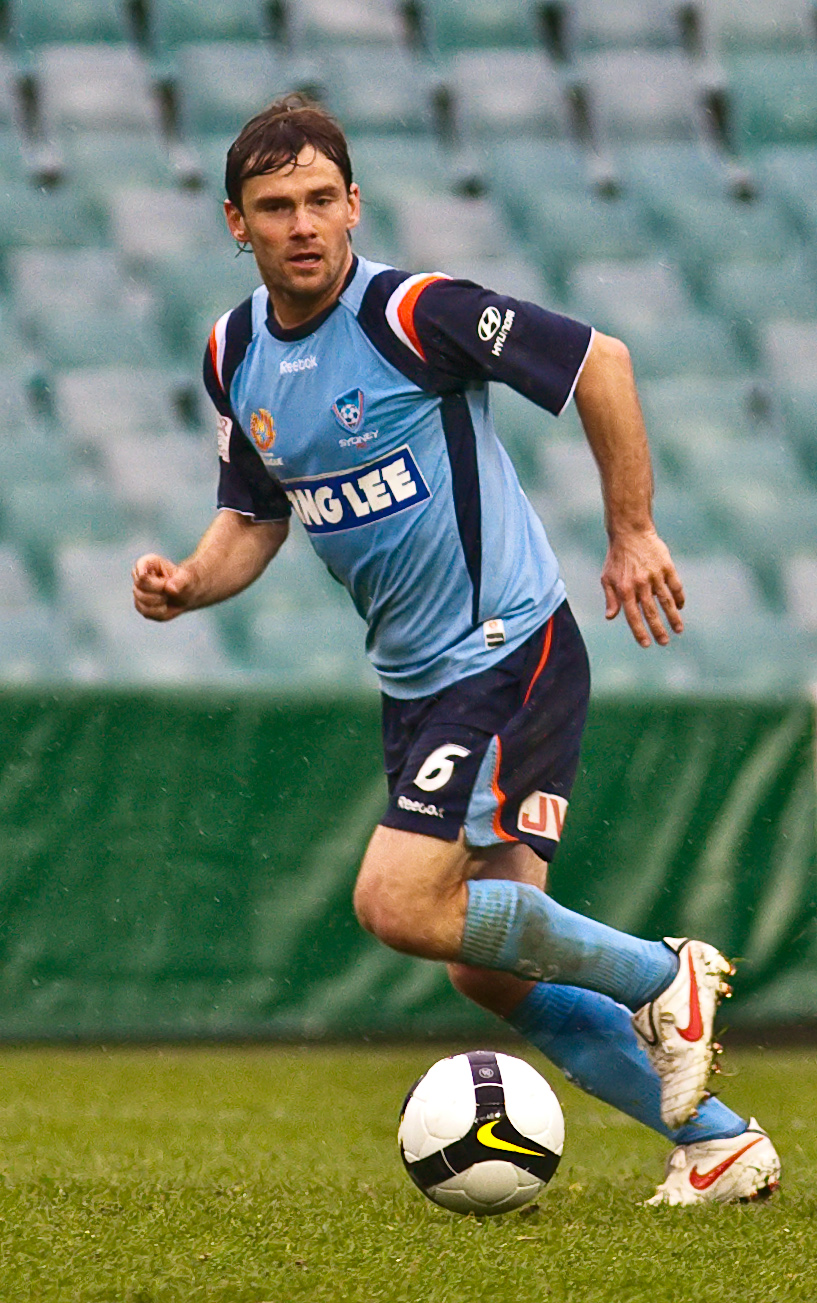
- Kisel playing for Sydney FC in 2009

Personal information
- Date of birth: 15 March 1977 (age 49)
- Place of birth: Košice, Czechoslovakia
- Height: 1.73 m (5 ft 8 in)
- Positions: Attacking midfielder; winger

Youth career
- 1984–1996: Lokomotíva Košice

Senior career*
Years	Team	Apps	(Gls)
1996–1998	Lokomotíva Košice	53	(5)
1998–2000	AS Trenčín	35	(3)
2000–2003	Bohemians Prague	83	(11)
2003–2005	Slovan Liberec	55	(8)
2005–2008	Sparta Prague	75	(12)
2009–2010	Sydney FC	29	(3)
2010–2011	Slavia Prague	27	(7)
2011–2012	Sydney FC	23	(4)
2012–2013	Slavia Prague	23	(7)
Total		403	(60)

International career
2002–2009	Slovakia	25	(1)
- * Club domestic league appearances and goals

Karol Kisel (born 15 March 1977) is a Slovak football agent and retired footballer.

== Club career ==
He previously played for Lokomotíva Košice, Ozeta Dukla Trenčín, Bohemians Praha, Sparta Prague and FC Slovan Liberec.

=== Sydney FC ===
In early 2009 he was linked with Australian A-League club Sydney FC for the 2009/10 season, where he would be reunited with former manager Vítězslav Lavička. On 3 April 2009, it was announced that Kisel had signed a one-year deal with the club.

He scored his first goal for the Sky Blues at home against the Brisbane Roar, which Sydney won 2–1. He scored his second goal in Sydney's 2–0 win over the Melbourne Victory to help claim the A-League Premiership.

=== Slavia Prague ===
Despite Sydney FC offering a new contract, Kisel declined the offer and returned to the Czech Republic to continue his law studies. In June 2010 he signed a 1-year contract with Slavia Prague. Kisel played as captain for the 2010–11 Gambrinus liga. Kisel played his final game with Slavia Prague in their 3–1 win over Bohemians 1905.

=== Return to Sydney FC ===
On 8 February 2011, Kisel re-signed with Sydney FC for the upcoming 2011-12 A-League Season. He was not eligible to play in the AFC Champions League due to Sydney FC's foreign spots being full. Kisel's last game for Sydney FC was the away Elimination final against Wellington Phoenix on 30 March 2012.

=== Return to Slavia Prague ===
On 22 May 2012, Slavia Prague announced Kisel's return for 2012–13 season. The transfer officially went through on 1 July 2012 when the Gambrinus Liga transfer window started. He once again assumed the role of team captain soon after his arrival. He scored his first goal on his return to the club, on the opening match day's 3–3 draw with Vysočina Jihlava. Kisel confirmed on 28 November 2013 that he would retire after Slavia's match against Liberec on Monday 1 December.

== International career ==
Kisel had been in and out of the Slovak national squad ever since he made his debut in 2002. He had also played several games for the Slovak U-21 squad. He played several games in Slovakia's attempt to qualify for the 2006 FIFA World Cup in Germany and he scored his first goal in qualifying Slovakia's 4-0 thumping of Luxembourg.

=== International goal ===
Score and result list Slovakia's goal tally first.

#	Date	Venue	Opponent	Score	Result	Competition
1.	8 June 2005	Stade Josy Barthel, Luxembourg, Luxembourg	Luxembourg	3–0	4–0	2006 FIFA World Cup qualification

== Honours ==
With Sparta Prague:

- Gambrinus Liga: 2006–2007
- Czech Cup: 2005–2006, 2007–2008, 2007–2008

With Sydney FC

- A-League: Premiers 2009–10
- A-League: Champions 2009–10
