= Vítězslav Lavička =

Czech footballer and manager

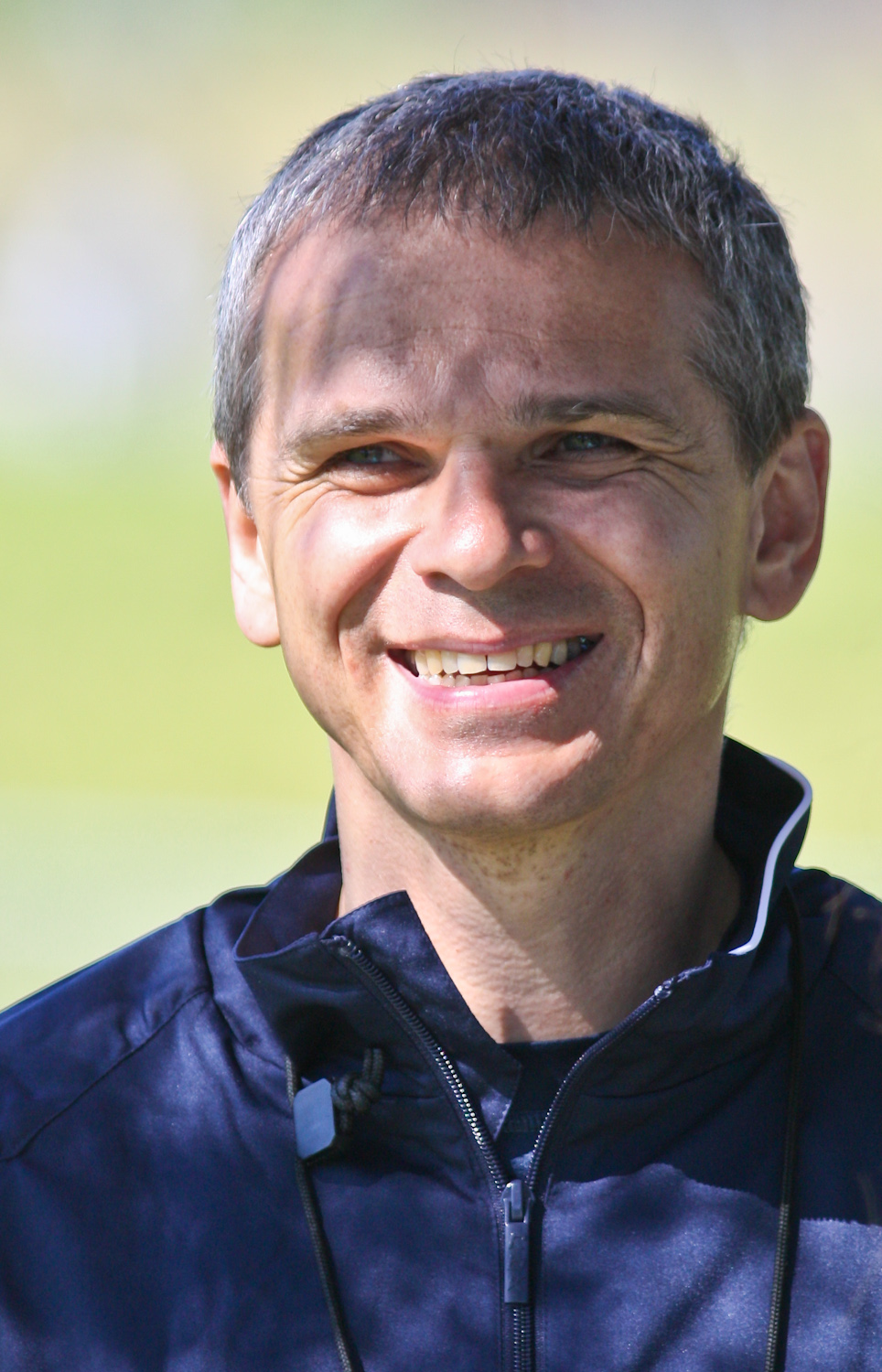

Personal information
- Date of birth: 30 April 1963 (age 63)
- Place of birth: Plzeň, Czechoslovakia
- Position: Midfielder

Youth career
- 1972–1980: Plzeň

Senior career*
Years	Team	Apps	(Gls)
1980–1982	Plzeň	25	(4)
1983–1984	Sparta Prague	46	(4)
1985–1986	RH Cheb	53	(7)
1987–1989	Sparta Prague	53	(9)
1990	Hradec Králové	5	(1)
1990–1992	Sparta Prague	33	(5)
1992–1994	Bohemians Prague	35	(2)
1994–1996	SK Chrudim	45	(9)
Total		295	(41)

Managerial career
- 2002: Sparta Prague
- 2002–2003: Viktoria Žižkov
- 2004–2007: Slovan Liberec
- 2007–2008: Czech Republic U21
- 2008: Sparta Prague
- 2009–2012: Sydney FC
- 2012–2015: Sparta Prague
- 2015–2018: Czech Republic U21
- 2019–2021: Śląsk Wrocław
- 2022: Kuwait
- * Club domestic league appearances and goals

Vítězslav Lavička (Czech pronunciation: [ˈviːcɛslaf ˈlavɪtʃka]; born 30 April 1963) is a Czech football manager and former player.

== Playing career ==
As a player, Lavička played for several Czech clubs, including Škoda Plzeň, RH Cheb and Sparta Prague. He played one season towards the end of his career in the Czech First League after the Czech Republic's national league commenced play in 1993.

== Managerial career ==
In 2006 and 2007, he was voted Coach of the Year at the Czech Golden Ball awards and Coach of the Year in 2006.

In June 2008, Lavička signed a two-year contract as the manager of Sparta Prague. However, after just four months in the position, he resigned following a humiliating 4–1 home defeat against Sparta's rivals Slavia.

=== Sydney FC ===
On 4 February 2009, he was appointed the new manager of Australian A-League club Sydney FC, along with Czech counterpart Michal Zach as assistant coach.

In the pre-season to 2009–10 A-League season, Lavička guided the team through a program of 12 matches against local teams and A-League opponents undefeated, scoring 25 goals and conceding 1 goal.

In Lavička's first league match, Sydney FC ran out 3–2 winners against expansion team North Queensland Fury, played in Townsville. The match also featured the A-League debut of Robbie Fowler for the Fury. He has been praised for bringing an impressive new style of football to the club.

Sydney then went on to win the A-League Minor Premiership after finishing narrowly ahead of Melbourne Victory and Gold Coast United, also securing them an Asian Champions League spot.

Lavička was voted A-League Coach of the Year for the 2009–2010 season by players in the league as part of the Professional Footballers Australia awards. His brilliant first season was rounded off as Sydney FC defeated Melbourne Victory in the A-League Grand Final after a penalty shootout victory at Etihad Stadium.

Lavička's second season started poorly, with the team not winning a game until round 11 against Perth Glory. Lavička, who is afraid of heights, said that if his team won, he would climb the Sydney Harbour Bridge, which he did.

It was announced on 3 February 2012 that Lavička would not have his contract renewed by Sydney FC, a mutual agreement between the board and Lavička himself, believed to have come about after he expressed that he was missing his family back in the Czech Republic. Lavicka stayed as manager until the end of the 2011–12 A-League season before departing.

=== Sparta Prague ===
After joining Sparta Prague in 2012, Lavička took them to the knockout stages of the 2012–13 Europa League. Sparta defeated Feyenoord 4–2 on aggregate to reach the group stage, where they finished second behind Lyon. Sparta were knocked out in the round of 32 by Chelsea, losing 1–2 in aggregate which included a 1–1 draw at home.

In the 2013-14 Czech league, Sparta Prague finished first, obtaining 79 points from 30 games and losing only once. Lavička followed up this success by winning the Czech cup in the same season, defeating Rivals (and league runner up) Viktoria Plzen on penalties. Sparta went on to win the 2014 Czech Supercup 3–0, once again against rivals Plzen.

=== Czech Republic U21 ===
Lavička signed on as the Under 21 Czech Republic manager in 2015, prior to the start of qualification for the 2017 UEFA Euro Under-21. Lavička guided the team to the top of their qualification group with 7 wins, 2 draws and 1 loss from 10 games, resulting in direct qualification to the final tournament.

=== Kuwait ===
On 21 February 2022, Lavička became the manager of Kuwait national team.

After failing to qualify for the 2023 AFC Asian Cup with defeats to Indonesia and Jordan, Lavička resigned from his post.

=== Return to Sparta ===
On 22 May 2023, Sparta Prague announced that Lavička would become the director of their football academy, starting from 1 June 2023.

== Managerial statistics ==
Team	Nat	From	To	Record				
Team	Nat	From	To	G	W	D	L	Win %
Sydney FC	(Australia)	2009	2012	95	36	24	35	37.89
Kuwait	(Kuwait)	March 2022	June 2022	6	2	1	3	33.33
Total				101	38	25	38	37.62

== Honours ==
=== Managerial ===
Slovan Liberec

- Czech First League: 2005–06

Sydney FC

- A-League Men Championship: 2009–10
- A-League Men Premiership: 2009–10

Sparta Prague

- Czech First League: 2013–14
- Czech Cup: 2013–14
- Czech Supercup: 2014

=== Individual ===
- Czech Coach of the Year: 2006, 2016
- Ekstraklasa Coach of the Month: August 2019, November 2019
- Sydney FC Hall of Fame: 2015
