= Stuart Musialik =

Australian professional soccer

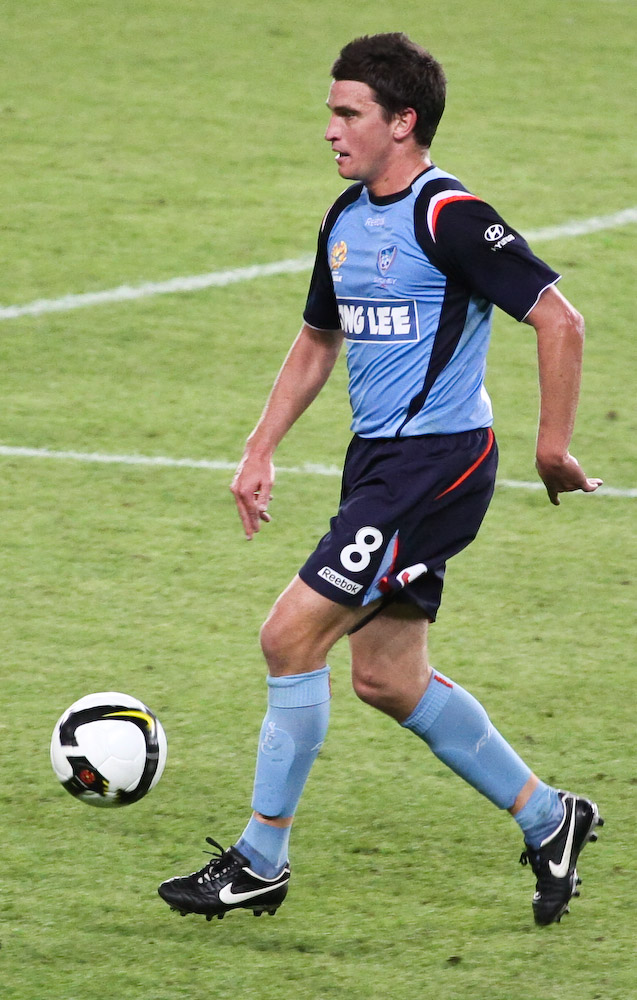

Personal information
- Date of birth: 29 March 1985 (age 41)
- Place of birth: Newcastle, Australia
- Height: 1.75 m (5 ft 9 in)
- Position: Defensive midfielder

Youth career
- Newcastle Breakers
- Newcastle Jets FC
- 2001–2003: AIS

Senior career*
Years	Team	Apps	(Gls)
2003–2004	Newcastle Jets FC	4	(0)
2004–2005	Weston Workers Bears	27	(5)
2005–2008	Newcastle Jets FC	58	(3)
2008–2011	Sydney FC	69	(4)
2011–2012	Central Coast Mariners	0	(0)
2013	Newcastle Jets NPL	4	(0)
2015	Adamstown Rosebud	4	(0)
2017	Adamstown Rosebud	15	(0)
2018	Hamilton Olympic	6	(0)

International career^{‡}
2004–2005	Australia U20	12	(4)
2006–2008	Australia U23	19	(0)
- * Club domestic league appearances and goals as of 12 September 2018 ‡ National team caps and goals as of 17:30, 20 January 2010 (UTC)

Stuart Musialik (born 29 March 1985) is an Australian former professional soccer player.

== Club career ==
Born and raised in Newcastle, he played junior football for Adamstown Rosebuds and was selected to play in representative sides such as Northern NSW at a young age. In 2004, he played for the Weston Workers Bears which under the care of Trevor Morris, awarded him a Newcastle Jets spot. The Weston Bears won the Premiership and then made it to the NBN State Football League Grand Final that they lost to Broadmeadow Magic. During his time at the Weston Workers Bears he played alongside Nigel Boogaard.

=== Newcastle Jets ===
Musialik played for the Newcastle Jets FC for the A-League's first three seasons. Musialik was suspended for 1 game on 27 September 2007 after verbally abusing Melbourne Victory FC defender Rodrigo Vargas, during a match against Melbourne on 21 September 2007, that ended in a 2–2 draw.

=== Sydney FC ===
Musialik followed his close friend Mark Bridge from the Newcastle Jets to Sydney FC to play under John Kosmina from 2008 to 2009. He signed a 2-year deal. Despite Sydney offering a contract extension, Musialik declined the offer demanding a pay rise and left Sydney at the end of the 2010/11 season. Despite being given a short extension for Sydney's 2011 Champions League campaign, Musialik was released, along with several other players.

=== Central Coast Mariners ===
On 25 July 2011, Musialik signed a one-year contract with Central Coast Mariners.

=== Career statistics ===
Club	Season	A-League		Finals		Asia		Other _{1}		Total	
Club	Season	Apps	Goals	Apps	Goals	Apps	Goals	Apps	Goals	Apps	Goals
Newcastle Jets FC	2005–06	19	1							19	1
Newcastle Jets FC	2006–07	19	1	3	0			5	0	24	1
Newcastle Jets FC	2007–08	13	1	4	0			1	0	18	1
Newcastle Jets FC	Club subtotal	51	3	7	0	0	0	6	0	67	0
Sydney FC	2008–09	19	3							19	3
Sydney FC	2009–10	21	1	4	0					25	1
Sydney FC	2010–11	25	0			6	0			31	0
Sydney FC	Club subtotal	65	4	4	0	6	0	0	0	76	4
Career total		116	7	11	0	6	0	6	0	139	7

_{1}Includes A-League Pre-Season Challenge Cup

== International career ==
He was on the Australian roster for the 2005 FIFA World Youth Championship, and has since played for the Olyroos against Chinese Taipei, in Adelaide at Hindmarsh Stadium. Stuart was one of Australia's best players in their 2008 Olympic campaign and gained many plaudits following his performances in Beijing.

== Honours ==
With Sydney FC:

- A-League Premiership: 2009-2010
- A-League Championship: 2009-2010

With Newcastle Jets FC:

- A-League Championship: 2007-2008

With Central Coast Mariners:

- A-League Premiership: 2011-2012

Personal honours:

- Newcastle Jets FC Coach's Award: 2006-2007
