= Gustavo Latronico =

Uruguayan footballer (born 1984)

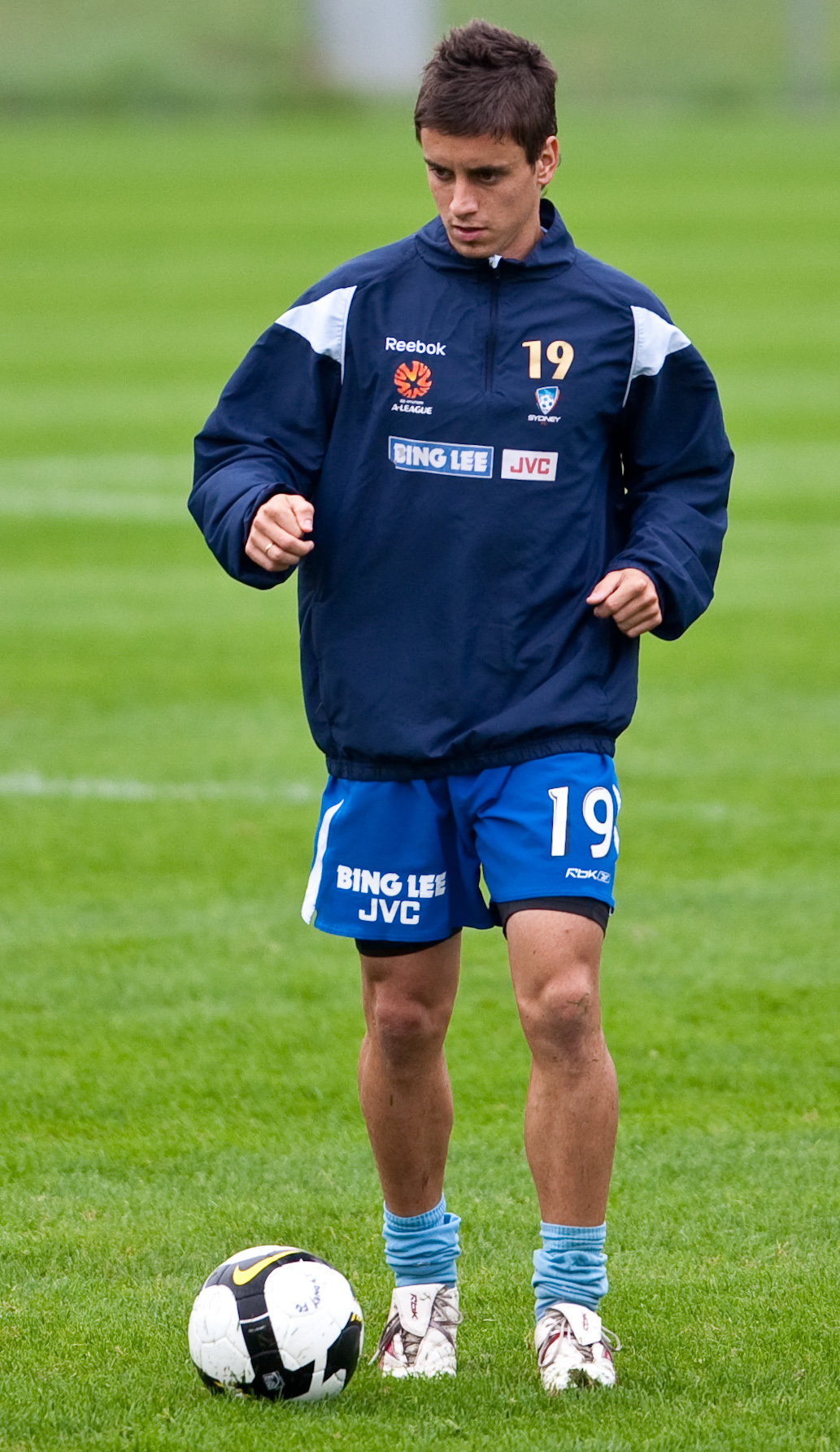

Personal information
- Date of birth: June 24, 1984 (age 42)
- Place of birth: Montevideo, Uruguay
- Height: 1.75 m (5 ft 9 in)
- Position: Central midfielder

Team information
- Current team: Club Atletico Bristol

Youth career
- C.A. Peñarol

Senior career*
Years	Team	Apps	(Gls)
- C.A. Peñarol
present	Club Atletico Bristol		

International career^{‡}
- Uruguay U17
- * Club domestic league appearances and goals as of May 2009 ‡ National team caps and goals as of May 2009

Gustavo Latronico (born June 24, 1984) is a Uruguayan born football player who currently plays with Club Atletico Bristol. He previously played for C.A Peñarol in the Uruguayan First Division. He is a midfielder and is currently trialling with Australian A-League club Sydney FC. Despite scoring for Sydney on a pre-season friendly against Penrith Nepean United, Latronico failed to sign with the Harbourside club.

Gustavo has also played 5 games for the Uruguay U17.
