= Shannon Cole =

Australian footballer (born 1984)

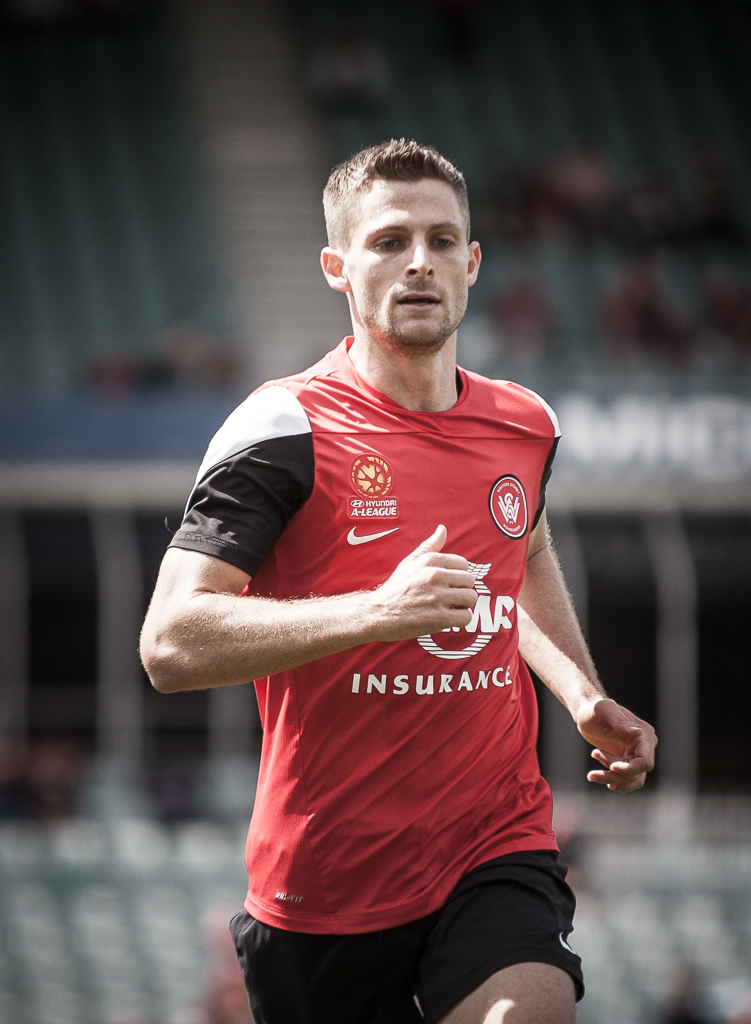
- Cole training with Western Sydney Wanderers in 2013

Personal information
- Full name: Shannon Cole
- Date of birth: 4 August 1984 (age 42)
- Place of birth: Sydney, Australia
- Height: 1.76 m (5 ft 9 in)
- Positions: Defender; midfielder

Youth career
- APIA Leichhardt
- Dulwich Hill
- Rockdale City Suns

Senior career*
Years	Team	Apps	(Gls)
2005	Parramatta Eagles	10	(5)
2006	Waitakere United	22	(3)
2007–2008	Sydney Olympic	28	(4)
2008–2012	Sydney FC	95	(8)
2012–2017	Western Sydney Wanderers	53	(2)
2017–2018	Sydney United 58	15	(0)
2019	FC Arizona	0	(0)

International career
2010	Australia	1	(0)

Managerial career
- 2019–2021: FC Arizona (Under 23s)
- 2022–2023: Sydney United 58 (Under 18s)
- 2023–: Central Coast United FC
- * Club domestic league appearances and goals

Shannon Cole (born 4 August 1984) is a former professional footballer turned coach, who is currently the head coach of Central Coast United in NSW League Two.

== Club career ==
Cole's early football career saw a series of stints with NSW state league clubs, in particular APIA Leichhardt, Dulwich Hill, Rockdale City Suns and Parramatta Eagles. He also left Australia for spells in US college football in the tiny Michigan town of Northville and semi-professional football with Waitakere United in New Zealand. Following this, Cole spent a month trialling with ambitious English Championship side Doncaster Rovers, before spending a stint with Israeli side Maccabi Netanya.

In an interview with the Sydney Morning Herald in July 2008, Cole reflected on these early globetrotting stages of his career: "With the college football, I had a friend over there already, so I went over for the year when I was 19 and it was just something I wanted to try, living away from home and live as a footballer. I kind of saw it as a personal challenge. Going to Europe was also great, but I don't have an EU passport at the moment and it made it difficult to get a deal. Being full-time with Doncaster, even for a month, was a great experience. The standard in Israel was also really high and there were a lot of really good, strong African boys there, but Netanya were looking for a senior player to come in and run the midfield, and I was just 22, so it didn't work out."

Cole signed with NSW Premier League club Sydney Olympic in 2007. During his time there, Cole was a member of the Sydney Olympic team that lifted the 2008 NSW Premier League Johnny Warren Cup, after a 2–1 extra time win in the final against the Sutherland Sharks. Cole provided the assist from a free kick for Olympic's first goal in this game, scored by Emmanuel Giannaros in the 52nd minute.

=== Sydney FC ===
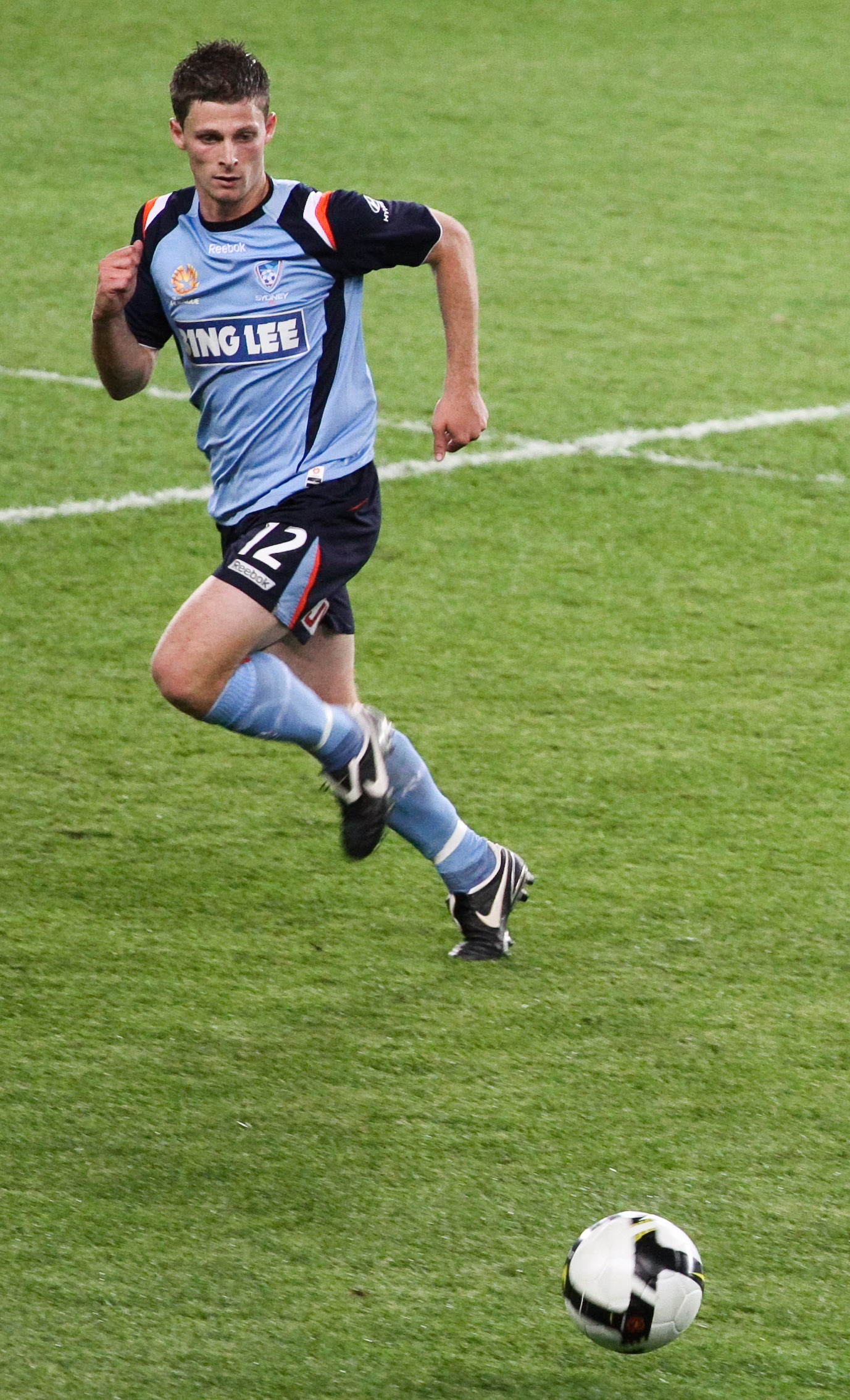
Cole playing for Sydney FC in 2008

On 15 August 2008 he was signed by Sydney FC on a two-year contract from Sydney Olympic. Chosen mainly because of his ability to play at left and right back or midfield. On 23 August 2008, Cole scored a free kick against Central Coast Mariners that curled over the wall into the bottom corner to put Sydney in the lead 3–2. This proved to be the winning goal. Another goal the next week against Perth Glory cemented his position in the team.

In December he scored his third goal for Sydney in their 3–2 loss to Melbourne Victory. His goal was the first of the match, just less than 30 seconds into the game.

In 2010–11 A-League, Cole scored a spectacular free-kick goal against Melbourne Victory at Sydney Football Stadium in Round 1 of Grand Final Replay on 7 August 2010. He scored again in Round 8 Mid-Week Fixture with a spectacular goal outside from penalty box against North Queensland Fury. Cole scored again, this time he ran past the defenders of Perth Glory to slide the ball past Tando Velaphi in Round 15 then later did a spectacular acrobatic jump.

=== Western Sydney Wanderers FC ===
On 30 June 2012, it was officially announced he had joined the newly formed Western Sydney Wanderers club.

After being at the club since it was formed, Cole announced that he would leave after 5 years.

== International career ==
On 1 October 2008 was called up from Socceroos coach Pim Verbeek for the Australia national football team for a training camp, he was not promoted for the 22 squad against Qatar. His second call was on 19 January 2009 against Indonesia and played 73 minutes in his debut.

== Honours ==
Sydney FC

- A-League Premiership: 2009–10
- A-League Championship: 2009–10

Western Sydney Wanderers

- A-League Premiership: 2012–13
- AFC Champions League: 2014

Individual

- 2014 AFC Champions League All Star
