= Rodrigo Vargas (soccer, born 1978) =

Australian football player (born 1978)

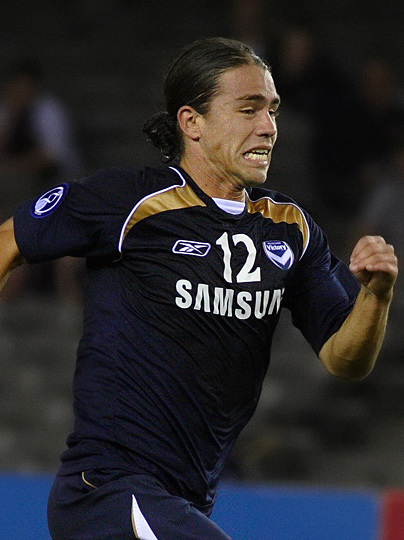
- Playing for Melbourne Victory against Gamba Osaka in April 2008.

Personal information
- Full name: Rodrigo Alejandro Vargas
- Date of birth: 20 October 1978 (age 48)
- Place of birth: Melbourne, Australia
- Height: 1.81 m (5 ft 11 1/2 in)
- Position: Central defender

Team information
- Current team: Nunawading City
- Number: 17

Senior career*
Years	Team	Apps	(Gls)
1996	Springvale City SC	17	(0)
1997–1999	Port Melbourne Sharks	67	(1)
1999–2004	Melbourne Knights FC	127	(4)
2004–2006	Green Gully Cavaliers	60	(9)
2006–2012	Melbourne Victory FC	139	(6)
2012–2016	Green Gully Cavaliers	111	(7)
2017–2018	Dandenong Thunder	33	(0)
2018	Bulleen Lions	10	(0)
2019–	Nunawading City		

International career^{‡}
2009	Australia	2	(0)
- * Club domestic league appearances and goals as of 24 September 2018 ‡ National team caps and goals as of 13 August 2009

Rodrigo Alejandro "Roddy" Vargas (born 20 October 1978) is an Australian soccer player who plays as a central defender for the Victorian State League Division 1 club Nunawading City FC, but is mostly known for his time at Melbourne Victory FC, Green Gully Cavaliers and at Melbourne Knights FC, where he was club captain.

He is the younger brother of former Olyroo Andy Vargas, and was a teammate of his at both Melbourne Knights and Green Gully.

== Club career ==
Vargas began his career at the Victorian Premier League side, Springvale City, where he debuted at the age of 17 under Gus McLeod. After three seasons with Port Melbourne, at the age of 21, he was recruited by National Soccer League side Melbourne Knights FC. He had a very successful tenure at the club, playing in over 100 games in five seasons as well as being awarded the captaincy. When the National Soccer League came to an end in 2004, he moved to the Victorian Premier League side Green Gully in 2005, where he developed a reputation as a goal scoring defender from set pieces.

Vargas was drafted into Melbourne Victory FC in 2006 after a successful trial, and soon became a key member of the Victory back line. He was the subject in a controversy when he was allegedly called a "black monkey" by the Newcastle United Jets midfielder, Stuart Musialik. Vargas was a key member of the Melbourne Victory team in their first appearance in the Asian Champions League in 2008 against Chunnan Dragons at the Telstra Dome. Vargas capped off a great performance with a brilliant goal, the club's second ever in Asia and only the second by Vargas for Melbourne Victory. Vargas was also captain for Melbourne Victory in their pre-season Cup win over Wellington Phoenix on 6 August 2008. On 28 March 2012, it was announced that he had been released from Melbourne Victory after six seasons with the club.

Two days later, Green Gully Cavaliers announced that he would rejoin his brother Andy at their club. He played his first match for them the next day. On 23 February 2013, Rodrigo Vargas was charged by the FFV with entering the field of play without permission and directing violent conduct towards an opposing Bentleigh Greens player during a pre-season practice match between Green Gully and Bentleigh. At a tribunal hearing on 13 March 2013 he pleaded guilty and was banned from FFV football until 14 April 2013. Vargas helped Green Gully secure the 2013 Dockerty Cup.

After being released by Green Gully after the 2016 season, Vargas joined NPL Victoria 2 side Dandenong Thunder SC. After his brother Andy Vargas was sacked as coach of Thunder in June 2018, Vargas joined FC Bulleen Lions.

== International career ==
Born in Australia, Vargas is of Chilean descent. He was included in the Australia national football team for the AFC World Cup qualification matches against Qatar and Iraq and an international friendly against Ghana, but did not play his first international game until January 2009 against Indonesia for an Asian Cup qualification match.

== Honours ==
Melbourne Victory

- A-League Championship: 2006-2007, 2008-2009
- A-League Premiership: 2006-2007, 2008-2009

Individual

- Melbourne Victory FC Victory Medal: 2007-2008
