= 2010–11 Sydney FC season =

Sydney FC
2010–2011 season
- Chairman: Scott Barlow
- Manager: Vítězslav Lavička
- A-League: 9th
- AFC Champions League: Group stage (3rd)
- Top goalscorer: Bruno Cazarine (9 goals)
- Highest home attendance: 12,106 (Round 1 vs Melbourne Victory
- Lowest home attendance: 4,012 (Round 16 vs Wellington Phoenix
Home colours	Away colours

The 2010–11 season was Sydney FC's sixth consecutive season in the A-League since the competition's inception. The club competed in the 2011 AFC Champions League after finishing premiers and champions in the 2009–10 A-League. In the preseason, Sydney hosted the inaugural Sydney Festival of Football, which saw competition between three clubs from different European leagues and Sydney FC.

== 2010–11 squad ==
Players included in a Sydney FC squad in the 2010–11 season Note: Flags indicate national team as defined under FIFA eligibility rules; some limited exceptions apply. Players may hold more than one non-FIFA nationality.

No.	Pos.	Nation	Player
1	GK	AUS	Liam Reddy
2	DF	AUS	Sebastian Ryall (Youth)
3	DF	SUI	Stephan Keller
5	DF	AUS	Hayden Foxe
6	MF	JPN	Hirofumi Moriyasu
7	MF	AUS	Brendan Gan
8	MF	AUS	Stuart Musialik
9	FW	BRA	Bruno Cazarine
10	MF	AUS	Nick Carle (Australian Marquee)
11	FW	AUS	Kofi Danning (Youth)
12	MF	AUS	Shannon Cole
13	DF	AUS	Antony Golec (Youth)

No.	Pos.	Nation	Player
15	MF	NIR	Terry McFlynn (Captain)
16	MF	AUS	Terry Antonis (Youth)
17	DF	AUS	Matthew Jurman (Youth)
18	FW	FIN	Juho Mäkelä
19	FW	AUS	Mark Bridge
20	GK	AUS	Ivan Necevski
21	DF	AUS	Scott Jamieson
22	DF	KOR	Byun Sung-Hwan
23	MF	AUS	Rhyan Grant (Youth)
24	MF	AUS	Dimitri Petratos (Injury replacement player)

== Transfers ==
=== Pre-season ===
Out

Player	To	League	Fee
(Australia) Steve Corica	Retired		
(Australia) Mitchell Prentice	Contract Terminated		
(Slovakia) Karol Kisel	(Czech Republic) Slavia Prague	(Czech Republic) Gambrinus liga	Released
(Australia) Simon Colosimo	(Australia) Melbourne Heart	(Australia) A-League	Free
(Australia) John Aloisi	(Australia) Melbourne Heart	(Australia) A-League	Free
(Australia) Clint Bolton	(Australia) Melbourne Heart	(Australia) A-League	Free
(Australia) Sam Gallagher	(Australia) Central Coast Mariners	(Australia) A-League	Free
(Australia) Adam Casey	(Australia) North Queensland Fury	(Australia) A-League	Released
(Australia) Chris Payne	(Australia) North Queensland Fury	(Australia) A-League	Free
(Philippines) Iain Ramsay	(Australia) Adelaide United	(Australia) A-League	Free

In

Player	From	League	Fee
(Australia) Liam Reddy	(New Zealand) Wellington Phoenix	(Australia) A-League	Free
(Australia) Scott Jamieson	(Australia) Adelaide United	(Australia) A-League	Free
(Australia) Nick Carle	(England) Crystal Palace FC	(England) Football League Championship	Free
(Australia) Terry Antonis	(Australia) AIS	(Australia) A-League National Youth League	Free
(Japan) Hirofumi Moriyasu	(Australia) APIA Leichhardt Tigers	(New South Wales) NSW Premier League	Not disclosed
(Brazil) Bruno Cazarine Constantino	(Brazil) Vila Nova Futebol Clube	(Brazil) Campeonato Brasileiro Série B	Free

=== January Transfer Window & Asian Champions League Signings ===
Out

Player	To	League	Fee
(Australia) Alex Brosque	(Japan) Shimizu S-Pulse	(Japan) J-League	$400,000
(South Korea) Byun Sung-Hwan	Released	Released	

In

Player	From	League	Fee
(Finland) Juho Mäkelä	(Finland) HJK Helsinki	(Finland) Veikkausliiga	Free
(Australia) David Williams	(Australia) North Queensland Fury	(Australia) A-League	6 Month Loan Deal
(Australia) Andrew Durante	(New Zealand) Wellington Phoenix	(New Zealand) A-League	6 Month Loan Deal

Players re-signed (pre-season)

Player	Resigned for
(Australia) Ivan Necevski	1 Year
(Australia) Stuart Musialik	1 Year
(Australia) Hayden Foxe	1 Year
(Northern Ireland) Terry McFlynn	3 Years
(Switzerland) Stephan Keller	1 Year
(Australia) Alex Brosque	3 Years
(Australia) Mark Bridge	2 Years
(Australia) Sebastian Ryall	2 Years
(Australia) Rhyan Grant	2 Years

Players re-signed (mid-season)

Player	Resigned for
(Japan) Hirofumi Moriyasu	2 Years
(Australia) Ivan Necevski	2 years

=== Pre-season & mid-season triallists ===
- (Australia) Joey Gibbs (unsuccessful)
- (Australia) Glen Trifiro (unsuccessful)
- (Australia) Terry Antonis (successful)
- (Australia) Nathan Sherlock (unsuccessful)
- (Australia) Dimitri Petratos (unsuccessful)
- (Australia) Tommy Crjack (unsuccessful)
- (Argentina) Luciano Olguin (unsuccessful)
- (Japan) Hirofumi Moriyasu (successful)
- (Senegal) Ibrahima Iyane Thiam (unsuccessful)
- (Brazil) Bruno Cazarine (successful)
- (Gabon) Gilles Mbang Ondo (unsuccessful)
- (Finland) Juho Mäkelä (successful)

== Events ==
=== March ===
- 25th: Liam Reddy signs a 3-year deal to Sydney FC from Wellington Phoenix as replacement for Clint Bolton.

=== May ===
- 21st: Scott Jamieson signs a 2-year contract to Sydney FC from Adelaide United.
- 26th: Nick Carle signs a 3-year contract to Sydney FC from Crystal Palace FC.

=== June ===
- 15th: Sydney FC play their first pre-season friendly against Manly United and win 2–1.
- 22nd: Sydney FC play their second pre-season friendly against Macarthur Rams and win 1–0.
- 30th: Sydney FC play their third pre-season friendly against Marconi Stallions and win 3–1.

=== July ===
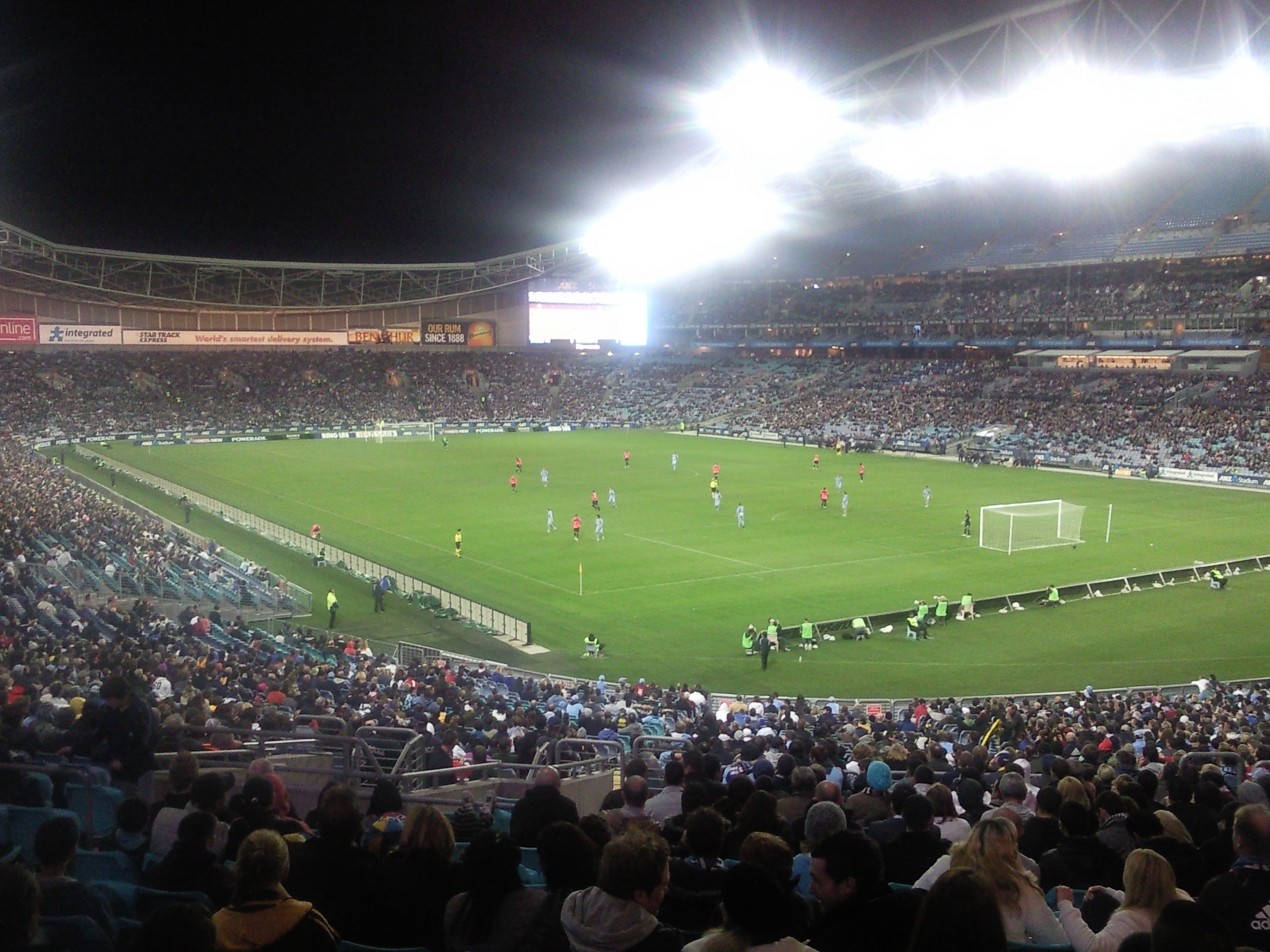
Sydney FC v Everton, 10 July 2010

- 5th: Terry Antonis signs a 3-year contract to Sydney FC from the AIS. He was officially signed on a 3-year contract to Sydney FC on 5 July 2010.
- 10th: Sydney FC play a pre-season friendly against Everton FC at ANZ Stadium and lose 1–0.
- 17th: Sydney FC play a pre-season friendly against Central Coast Mariners at Sydney Showground and play out a 2–2 draw.
- 21st: Hirofumi Moriyasu signs a 1-year contract to Sydney FC.
- 22nd: Alex Brosque extends his contract with Sydney FC for a further 3-years.
- 25th: Sydney Festival of Football Sydney FC lose 5–3 to Super League Greece club AEK Athens on Match day 1.
- 28th: Sydney Festival of Football: Sydney FC draw 0–0 against Scottish Premier League club Rangers F.C. in torrential rain.
- 31st: Sydney Festival of Football: Sydney FC lose 2–1 to English Premier League club Blackburn Rovers

=== August ===
- 7th: Round 1. 3–3 draw with Melbourne Victory at Sydney Football Stadium.
- 14th: Round 2. 2–1 loss with North Queensland Fury at Dairy Farmers Stadium, Townsville.
- 21st: Round 3. 1–0 loss with Brisbane Roar at Suncorp Stadium, Brisbane
  - 21st: Terry McFlynn plays his 100th game for Sydney FC in the A-League.
- 28th: Round 4. 1–1 draw with Central Coast Mariners at the SFS. Liam Reddy red carded after fouling Patricio Pérez.
- 31st: Bruno Cazarine Constantino signs with Sydney FC

=== September ===
- 4th Round 5: 3–1 loss to Adelaide United at the Sydney Football Stadium. The result leaves Sydney winless and with only 2 points from 5 rounds.
- 11th Round 6: 2–1 loss to Wellington Phoenix at Westpac Stadium in Wellington.
- 26 Round 8: 1–1 draw with Gold Coast United at Sydney Football Stadium. Bruno Cazarine scoring for Sydney FC in the first half.
- 29th: Round 9: 1–1 draw with North Queensland Fury in front of Sydney FC's lowest record crowd, on a cold, wet Wednesday night.

=== October ===
- 4th: Sydney FC lose their 5th game of the season, going down 2–1 to Adelaide United at the Sydney Football Stadium. The loss keeps them at the bottom of the ladder, without a win after 9 rounds.
- 16th: 3–0 loss to The City Derby rivals Melbourne Victory at Etihad Stadium in Melbourne. The loss keeps them at the bottom of the ladder on 4 points.
- 24th: Sydney FC finally win their first game of the season, in the 11th Round, with a crushing 3–0 victory over mid-table stragglers Perth Glory at nib stadium in Perth. Brazilian import Bruno Cazarine scoring twice on either side of half time, and Alex Brosque giving the Sky Blues some mid-season hope.
- 30th: A 1–1 draw against 2nd on the table Brisbane Roar gives Sydney a 2-game unbeaten streak.

=== November ===
- 3rd: Vitezslav Lavicka, in an attempt to boost their dwindling striker stocks, brings in Gabon striker Gilles Mbang Ondo on trial from Iceland Club Knattspyrnudeild UMFG.
- 4th: After several pleasing performances with the club, Lavicka offers Japanese import Hirofumi Moriyasu a 2-year extension with the club, which he gratefully accepted.
- 7th: Sydney win their second match of the season, albeit it being under controversial circumstances due to a refereeing blunder, a 1–0 victory over North Coast rivals Newcastle Jets at the Sydney Football Stadium. Bruno Cazarine scored the eventual winner in the 76th minute
- 12th: Sydney FC re-sign goalkeeper Ivan Necevski on a 2-year contract after he had signed a 1-year extension at the conclusion of the 2009–10 season.
  - 12th: Sydney FC end their 3-game unbeaten streak, losing 3–1 to Gold Coast United at Skilled Park. Bruno Cazarine scored his 6th goal in 10 games for the Sky Blues, moving to the top of the goalscoring charts alongside Adelaide United's Dutchman Sergio van Dijk.
- 21st: Sydney FC defeat Perth Glory 2–0 in at Parramatta Stadium in front of their lowest ever record crowd of 6,654. Goals coming from Alex Brosque and Shannon Cole.
  - 21st: Striker Alex Brosque plays his 100th A-League game for Sydney FC, also scoring to help Sydney defeat Perth 2–0.
- 27th: Sydney play out a 0–0 draw against new A-League team Melbourne Heart at the new AAMI Park. Sydney faced up against former Championship players Clint Bolton, Simon Colosimo, and John Aloisi for the first time since the trio left the club following the 2010 A-League Grand Final.

=== December ===
- 1st Sydney FC have defeated Wellington Phoenix at Sydney Football Stadium with Mark Bridge finally scored his first goal for the season and convincing 3–1 win in front of the lowest crowd attendance 4012.
- 4th Sydney FC have suffered their worst defeat against the Central Coast Mariners at Bluetongue Stadium with 4–0 thumping at the hands of Central Coast Mariners.
- 11th Sydney FC have boosted their striker positions with the signing of Finnish striker Juho Mäkelä. He is expected to play for the Sky Blues early January next year. He signed an 18-month deal.
- 12th Unfortunately, Sydney FC have gone down again, losing 1–0 to league leaders Brisbane Roar in front of crowd at Sydney Football Stadium.
- 16th Sydney FC have slumped to their third loss, going down to wooden spooners North Queensland Fury 1–0 at Dairy Farmers Stadium. Despite this loss, Sydney FC's position is falling from 9th to 10th.
- 23rd Sydney FC have slumped to their fourth straight loss, going down to newcomers Melbourne Heart 1–0 at Sydney Football Stadium, thanks to late goal by Adrian Zahra. Three former players: Simon Colosimo, John Aloisi and Clint Bolton were solid in defence, attack and goalkeeping.
- 29th Again, Sydney FC have slumped to their fifth straight loss, going down to 2nd placed Adelaide United at Adelaide Oval, 2–0.

=== January 2011 ===
- 3rd Sydney FC have snapped their five match losing streak beating Newcastle Jets at Energy Australia Stadium in front of the highest crowd of the home stadium, 12,118, thanks to first goal scored in Sydney's colours by Hirofumi Moriyasu and Bruno Cazarine's seventh goal of the season. The win lifts the Sky Blues off the bottom of the table.
- 8th Defending champions Sydney FC have made back-to-back wins for the first time this season. They also have broken their drought, beating 10-man Gold Coast United for the first time, beating them 2–0 at Sydney Football Stadium in front of 6,135. Young player Dimitri Petratos and new Finnish recruit Juho Makela scored their first goal in Sky Blue colours, thanks to fantastic display by midfielders Nick Carle and Hirofumi Moriyasu. The win lifts them to 9th place however, they must win the remaining games to make the top 6.
- 15th At Sydney Football Stadium just under the best crowd attendance of 12,106 back in Round 1 (officially 11,388), Sydney FC have all kept their finals dream alive but with a late equaliser by Juho Makela in 1–1 draw against their biggest rivals Melbourne Victory who lost their key players: Kevin Muscat, Robbie Kruse, Archie Thompson, could lift the Sky Blues a boost to the finals. However, it is not bad for them, the unbeaten streak stretched to 3 games. The Sky Blues will be travelling to Gosford next week against Central Coast Mariners at Bluetongue Stadium which they will avenge during their 4–0 loss few weeks ago if they want to make the finals.
- 18th It is known that Sydney FC coach Vitezslav Lavicka will lead the Sky Blues in 2011 Asian Champions League. The board meeting decided that they will not sack him.
- 23rd Sydney FC once again, has maintained their unbeaten streak to 4 games, but their dream in the finals has been dealt a blow with a 2–2 draw against Central Coast Mariners at Bluetongue Stadium. It starts off ok with the defending champions lead 2–0 at half-time but Central Coast Mariners pulled off a comeback with goals to Patricio Perez and Matthew Simon. The Sky Blues' next opponent will be Perth Glory at Members Equity Stadium, which they will win the next game, since defeating them two times this season.
- 30th Once again, Sydney FC have stretched their unbeaten games to 5 and kept their finals hopes alive with a solid 2–0 win over Perth Glory at Members Equity Stadium. The win lifts them 4 points adrift Melbourne Heart. Thanks to the finally goal scored by Nicky Carle after injury concern and the second goal scored by Bruno Cazarine who scored his 8th goal of the season. Sky Blues' next opponent will be the archrivals Newcastle Jets at EnergyAustralia Stadium.
- 31st Sydney FC sold a key striker Alex Brosque to Shimizu S-Pulse in J-League. However, the Sky Blues claim that the Japanese side approached him without their permission to do so.

=== February 2011 ===
- 6th Sydney FC's finals are all but over with a thrilling 1–1 draw against Newcastle Jets at EnergyAustralia Stadium. Sky Blues almost had a chance to break the 1–1 draw to make it 2–1 win but time has run out. They are out of the finals for second time. The 1st time they didn't make the finals is in season 2008–09. They are now focusing on the upcoming 2011 Asian Champions League in March. Sydney FC's next game is against Wellington Phoenix at Sydney Football Stadium, their last home game of the season.
- 17th Sydney FC sign North Queensland Fury striker David Williams on a 6-month loan for the Asian Champions League.
- 25th Sydney FC sign Wellington Phoenix player Andrew Durante on a loan deal for the Asian Champions League.
- 26th Sydney FC board re-sign manager Vitezslav Lavicka on a 12-month extension, allowing him to coach Sydney through the Asian Champions League, and into the 2011–12 season.

=== March 2011 ===
- 2nd: Sydney FC play their first Asian Champions League match against Suwon Samsung Bluewings and draw 0–0. Captain Terry McFlynn is sent off in the 32nd minute for stomping on the leg of Lee Sang-ho.

=== April 2011 ===
- 6th: Sydney draw 1–1 with Chinese Super League and Sister Club, Shanghai Shenhua at the Sydney Football Stadium. Nick Carle scoring for Sydney in the 12th minute, leveling the scores at 1–1 after Shanghai's Duvier Riascos opened the scoring in the 6th minute.
- 13th: Sydney FC lose 3–0 to Kashima Antlers at the Sydney Football Stadium. Kashima scoring via Fellype Gabriel, Takuya Nozawa, and Shinzo Koroki.
- 19th: Sydney FC win their first 2011 Champions League game in a hard-fought match against Shanghai Shenhua at Hongkou Stadium in Shanghai. Sydney won 3–2 with a double from Bruno Cazarine and a late extra-time goal from Mark Bridge sealing the victory.

=== May 2011 ===
- 3rd: Sydney FC lose 3–1 to Suwon Samsung Bluewings in the return leg. Bruno Cazarine scoring his third goal in the Champions League. Sydney had to win this game, to provide any chance of progressing through the round of 16.
- 10th: Sydney FC lose their final ACL group game in Tokyo, Japan against J-League club Kashima Antlers. Sydney FC took the lead midway through the first half via a Matthew Jurman header, but failed to hold on, conceding two soft second half goals as the Japanese side ran out 2–1 winners.

== Pre-season ==
15 June 2010	Manly United	1–2	Sydney FC	Cromer Park
	Cattanach 45' (pen.)	Report	Gan 10'; Lobb 68' (own goal)	Attendance: 500

22 June 2010	Macarthur Rams	0–1	Sydney FC	Campbelltown Stadium
		Report	Petratos 90'	Attendance: 2,214

30 June 2010	Marconi Stallions	1–3	Sydney FC	Marconi Stadium
	O’Connell 65'	Report	Brosque 13', 28'; Bridge 33'	Attendance: 1,700

10 July 2010	Sydney FC	0–1	(England) Everton	ANZ Stadium
Saturday, 7.00 pm EST		Report	Anichebe 46'	Attendance: 40,466; Referee: Strebre Delovski

17 July 2010	Central Coast Mariners	2–2	Sydney FC	Sydney Showground
	Kwasnik 59'; Simon 67'	Report	Brosque 1'; Bridge 60'	Attendance: 700; Referee: Griffiths-Jones

=== 2010 Sydney Festival of Football ===
25 July 2010	Sydney FC	3–5	(Greece) AEK Athens	Sydney Football Stadium
12:45 pm EST	Brosque 31' (pen.), 48'; Iyane Thiam 88'	Report	Leonardo 30'; Blanco 36'; Liberopoulos 60'; Scocco 74'; Kafes 76'	Attendance: 14,153; Referee: Ben Williams

28 July 2010	Sydney FC	0–0	(Scotland) Rangers	Sydney Football Stadium
Wednesday, 7.30 pm EST		Report		Attendance: 9,483; Referee: Matthew Breeze

31 July 2010	Sydney FC	1–2	(England) Blackburn Rovers	Sydney Football Stadium
Saturday, 7.30 pm EST	Brosque 81'	Report	Emerton 37'; Gamst Pedersen 67'	Attendance: 15,237; Referee: Ben Williams

== 2010–11 A-League season ==
7 August 2010	Sydney FC	3–3	Melbourne Victory	Sydney Football Stadium
Saturday 8.00 pm EST	Brosque 36'; McFlynn 53'; Cole 86'	Report; Summary		Attendance: 12,106; Referee: Matthew Breeze

14 August 2010	North Queensland Fury	2–1	Sydney FC	Dairy Farmers Stadium
Saturday 5.30 pm EST	Grossman 65'; Daal 83'	Report; Summary	Jamieson 82'	Attendance: 5,177; Referee: Peter Green

21 August 2010	Brisbane Roar	1–0	Sydney FC	Suncorp Stadium
Saturday, 7.30 pm EST	McKay 53'	Report; Summary		Attendance: 10,339; Referee: Chris Beath

28 August 2010	Sydney FC	1–1	Central Coast Mariners	Sydney Football Stadium
Saturday, 7.30 pm EST	Grant 47'; Reddy (red card) 71'	Report; Summary	Pérez 73' (pen.)	Attendance: 10,147; Referee: Matthew Breeze

4 September 2010	Sydney FC	1–3	Adelaide United	Sydney Football Stadium
Saturday, 7.30 pm EST	Keller 58'	Report; Summary	van Dijk 9', 53'; Leckie 37'	Attendance: 7,558; Referee: Peter Green

11 September 2010	Wellington Phoenix	2–1	Sydney FC	Westpac Stadium
Saturday, 7.15 pmNZT	Ifill 50' (pen.); Ward 72'	Report; Summary	Cazarine 67'	Attendance: 8,453; Referee: Chris Beath

26 September 2010	Sydney FC	1–1	Gold Coast United	Sydney Football Stadium
Sunday, 3:00 pm EST	Cazarine 20'	Report; Summary	Djite 45+1'; Curtis (red card)	Attendance: 9,977; Referee: Ben Williams

29 September 2010	Sydney FC	1–1	North Queensland Fury	Sydney Football Stadium
Wednesday, 7.30 pm EST	Cole 37'	Report; Summary	Williams 76'	Attendance: 6,978; Referee: Ryan Shepheard

4 October 2010	Sydney FC	1–2	Adelaide United	Sydney Football Stadium
Monday, 5:00 pm EST	Brosque 40' (pen.)	Report; Summary	Cole 56' (o.g.); Ramsay 90+1'	Attendance: 7,071; Referee: Gerard Parsons

16 October 2010	Melbourne Victory	3–0	Sydney FC	Etihad Stadium
Saturday, 7:00 pm EST	Vargas 20'; Hernzandez 49'; Kruse 90'	Report; Summary		Attendance: 17,299; Referee: Ben Williams

24 October 2010	Perth Glory	0–3	Sydney FC	nib stadium
Sunday 7:00 pm EST		Report; Summary	Cazarine 25', 82'; Brosque 53'	Attendance: 8,870; Referee: Ben Williams

30 October 2010	Sydney FC	1–1	Brisbane Roar	Sydney Football Stadium
6:00 pm EST	Brosque 34'	Report; Summary	DeVere 8'	Attendance: 10,746; Referee: Peter Green

7 November 2010	Sydney FC	1–0	Newcastle Jets	Sydney Football Stadium
5:00 pm EST	Cazarine 76'	Report; Summary		Attendance: 8,512; Referee: Chris Beath

12 November 2010	Gold Coast United	3–1	Sydney FC	Skilled Park
7:30 pm EST	J. Porter 15', 54'; Culina 44'	Report; Summary	Cazarine 58'	Attendance: 2,536; Referee: Kris Griffiths-Jones

21 November 2010	Sydney FC	2–0	Perth Glory	Parramatta Stadium
Sunday 15:00 EDT	Cole 75'; A. Brosque 81'	Report; Summary		Attendance: 6,654; Referee: Peter Green

27 November 2010	Melbourne Heart	0–0	Sydney FC	AAMI Park
Saturday 17:00 EDT		Report; Summary	Byun (yellow card) 90+2' (yellow-red card) 90+4'	Attendance: 5,128; Referee: Alan Milliner

1 December 2010	Sydney FC	3–1	Wellington Phoenix	Sydney Football Stadium
Wednesday 19:00 EDT	B.Gan 14'; M. Bridge 74'; A. Brosque 76'	Report; Summary	D. Macallister 83'	Attendance: 4,012; Referee: Gerard Parsons

4 December 2010	Central Coast Mariners	4–0	Sydney FC	Bluetongue Stadium
Saturday 19:00 EDT	A.Kwasnik 1', 23'; M.Simon 5'; Ryall 46' (o.g.)	Report; Summary		Attendance: 7,160; Referee: Matthew Breeze

12 December 2010	Sydney FC	0–1	Brisbane Roar	Sydney Football Stadium
Sunday 17:00 EDT		Report; Summary	K.Barbarouses 41'	Attendance: 7,554; Referee: Jarred Gillett

15 December 2010	North Queensland Fury	1–0	Sydney FC	Dairy Farmers Stadium
Wednesday 19:30 EDT	U.Talay 71'	Report; Summary		Attendance: 2,761; Referee: Chris Beath

23 December 2010	Sydney FC	0–1	Melbourne Heart	Sydney Football Stadium
Thursday 19:00 EDT		Report; Summary	A.Zahra 85'	Attendance: 6,654; Referee: Ben Williams

29 December 2010	Adelaide United	2–0	Sydney FC	Adelaide Oval
Wednesday 19:30 EDT	S.Van Dijk 35'; Foxe 58' (o.g.)	Report; Summary		Attendance: 16,429; Referee: Gerard Parsons

3 January 2011	Newcastle Jets	1–2	Sydney FC	Energy Australia Stadium
Monday 17:00 EDT	L.Haliti 66'	Report; Summary	H.Moriyasu 36' B.Cazarine 45+1'	Attendance: 12,118; Referee: Matthew Gillett

8 January 2011	Sydney FC	2–0	Gold Coast United	Sydney Football Stadium
Saturday 19:30 EDT	D.Petratos 32' J.Makela 90+2'	Report; Summary		Attendance: 6,135; Referee: Chris Beath

15 January 2011	Sydney FC	1–1	Melbourne Victory	Sydney Football Stadium
Saturday 19:30 EDT	J.Makela 90+1'	Report; Summary	D.Allsopp 51'	Attendance: 11,387; Referee: Matthew Breeze

23 January 2011	Central Coast Mariners	2 –2	Sydney FC	Bluetongue Stadium
Sunday 17:00 EDT	P.Perez 49' M.Simon 57'	Report; Summary	D.Petratos 17', 27'	Attendance: 10,546; Referee: Srebre Delovski

29 January 2011	Perth Glory	0 –2	Sydney FC	nib Stadium
Saturday 18:45 WST		Report; Summary	Carle 9'; Cazarine 54'	Referee: Gerard Parsons

6 February 2011	Newcastle Jets	1–1	Sydney FC	EnergyAustralia Stadium
Sunday 17:00 EDT	Petrovski 84'	Report; Summary	Cazarine 77'	Attendance: 6,780; Referee: Peter Green

9 February 2011	Sydney FC	2–0	Wellington Phoenix	Sydney Football Stadium
Wednesday 19:00 EDT	Ward 54' (o.g.); Gan 69'	Report; Summary		Attendance: 4,372; Referee: Peter Green

12 February 2011	Melbourne Heart	2–2	Sydney FC	AAMI Park
Sunday 19:00 EDT				Referee: Ben Williams

Pos	Team	Pld	W	D	L	GF	GA	GD	Pts	Qualification
1	Brisbane Roar (C)	30	18	11	1	58	26	+32	65	Qualification for 2012 AFC Champions League group stage and Finals series (Note: First place qualifies for the 2012 AFC Champions League group stage. Winning the 2011 A-League Grand Final automatically earns qualification for the 2012 AFC Champions League group stage, unless first place are champions. Second place qualifies for the 2012 AFC Champions League qualifying play-off, unless they qualify for the 2011 A-League Grand Final alongside first place or become A-League Champions, subsequently third place then qualify for the 2012 AFC Champions League qualifying play-off.)
2	Central Coast Mariners	30	16	9	5	50	31	+19	57	Qualification for 2012 AFC Champions League group stage and Finals series
3	Adelaide United	30	15	5	10	51	36	+15	50	Qualification for 2012 AFC Champions League qualifying play-off and Finals series
4	Gold Coast United	30	12	10	8	40	32	+8	46	Qualification for Finals series
5	Melbourne Victory	30	11	10	9	45	39	+6	43	Qualification for Finals series
6	Wellington Phoenix	30	12	5	13	39	41	−2	41	Qualification for Finals series
7	Newcastle Jets	30	9	8	13	29	33	−4	35	
8	Melbourne Heart	30	8	11	11	32	42	−10	35	
9	Sydney FC	30	8	10	12	35	40	−5	34	
10	Perth Glory	30	5	8	17	27	54	−27	23	
11	North Queensland Fury	30	4	7	19	28	60	−32	19	

Source: ultimatealeague.com
Rules for classification: 1) points; 2) goal difference; 3) number of goals scored.
(C) Champions

== Asian Champions League Campaign ==
Sydney FC have been drawn into Group H of the 2011 AFC Champions League. They will face off against Japan's Kashima Antlers, People's Republic of China Shanghai Shenhua and South Korea's Suwon Samsung Bluewings.

2 March 2011	Sydney FC (Australia)	0–0	(South Korea) Suwon Samsung Bluewings	Sydney Football Stadium
20:00 UTC+10	McFlynn (red card) 32'	Report		Attendance: 7095; Referee: Abdul Mailk Abdul Bashir (Singapore)

6 April 2011	Sydney FC (Australia)	1–1	(China) Shanghai Shenhua	Sydney Football Stadium
20:00 UTC+10	Carle 13'	Report	Riascos 6'	Attendance: 7,007; Referee: Abdullah Balideh (Qatar)

13 April 2011 (Note: The Kashima Antlers v Sydney FC match was postponed from 16 March 2011 to 10 May 2011 due to the 2011 Tōhoku earthquake and tsunami in Japan. The return match, Sydney FC v Kashima Antlers, was brought forward from 10 May 2011 to 13 April 2011. All home matches of the Kashima Antlers were moved to the National Olympic Stadium in Tokyo as the Kashima Soccer Stadium in Kashima was damaged in the earthquake.)	Sydney FC (Australia)	0–3	(Japan) Kashima Antlers	Sydney Football Stadium
20:00 UTC+10		Report	Nozawa 41'; Gabriel 61'; Koroki 90+3'	Attendance: 7,320; Referee: Ali Hamad Madhad Saif Albawawi (United Arab Emirates)

19 April 2011	Shanghai Shenhua (China)	2–3	(Australia) Sydney FC	Hongkou Stadium
20:00 UTC+8	Jiajun 8'	Report	Cazarine 45+1', 59'; Bridge 90+1'	Attendance: 10,215; Referee: Subkhiddin Mohd Salleh (Malaysia)

3 May 2011	Suwon Samsung Bluewings (South Korea)	3–1	(Australia) Sydney FC	Suwon World Cup Stadium
19:30 UTC+9	Ha Tae-Gyun 34'; Neretljak 50'; Yeom Ki-Hoon 80'	Report	Cazarine 51'	Attendance: 9,495; Referee: Ravshan Irmatov (Uzbekistan)

10 May 2011	Kashima Antlers (Japan)	2–1	(Australia) Sydney FC	National Olympic Stadium
15:00 UTC+9	Osako 64'; Nozawa 84'	Report	Jurman 26'	Attendance: 3,164; Referee: Khalil Al Ghamdi (Saudi Arabia)

=== Group ladder ===
Pos	Team	Pld	W	D	L	GF	GA	GD	Pts	Qualification
1	(South Korea) Suwon Samsung Bluewings	6	3	3	0	12	3	+9	12 (Note: Tiebreakers: Suwon Samsung Bluewings and Kashima Antlers are also tied on their head-to-head records (2 pts, 0 GD, 2 GF), and so are ranked by their overall goal difference.)	Advance to knockout stage
2	(Japan) Kashima Antlers	6	3	3	0	9	3	+6	12	Advance to knockout stage
3	(Australia) Sydney FC	6	1	2	3	6	11	−5	5	
4	(China) Shanghai Shenhua	6	0	2	4	3	13	−10	2	

== A-League Season Statistics ==
=== Leading scorers ===
Sydney FC A-League Top Scorers

- Correct as of Round 24

Rank	Scorer	Goals
1	(Brazil) Bruno Cazarine	9
2	(Australia) Alex Brosque	6
3	(Australia) Shannon Cole	3
3	(Australia) Dimitri Petratos	3
4	(Finland) Juho Mäkelä	2
4	(Australia) Brendan Gan	2
5	(Australia) Scott Jamieson	1
5	(Australia) Rhyan Grant	1
5	(Australia) Nicky Carle	1
5	(Northern Ireland) Terry McFlynn	1
5	(Switzerland) Stephan Keller	1
5	(Australia) Mark Bridge	1
5	(Japan) Hirofumi Moriyasu	1

=== Discipline ===
- Correct as of Round 10

Name	Cautions (yellow card)	2nd Caution – Send-Off (yellow card) (yellow card) (red card)	Send-Offs (red card)
(Australia) Nick Carle	1		
(Australia) Alex Brosque	1		
(Australia) Shannon Cole	1		
(Australia) Sebastian Ryall	1		
(Australia) Hayden Foxe	2		
(Australia) Scott Jamieson	4		
(Australia) Stuart Musialik	2		
(Australia) Mark Bridge	2		
(South Korea) Byun Sung-Hwan	2	1	
(Switzerland) Stephan Keller	2		
(Brazil) Bruno Cazarine	1		

- Liam Reddy was sent off in the Round 4 game against Central Coast Mariners after referee Matthew Breeze deemed he had tripped Patricio Pérez in the box. However, this red card was rebuked by the Match Review Panel, which deemed Perez to have dived in the box, and as a result handed Perez a 2-week ban.

=== Home attendance ===
- Correct as of Round 30

Round	Opponent	Attendance
1	Melbourne Victory	12,106
4	Central Coast Mariners	10,147
5	Adelaide United	7,558
7	Gold Coast United	9,977
8	North Queensland Fury	6,978
9	Adelaide United	7, 071
12	Brisbane Roar	10,746
13	Newcastle Jets	8,512
14	Perth Glory	6,654
16	Wellington Phoenix	4,012
19	Brisbane Roar	7,554
21	Melbourne Heart	6,639
23	Gold Coast United	6,135
24	Melbourne Victory	11,387
29	Wellington Phoenix	4,372
Total Attendance		119,848
Average Attendance		7,990

=== Injury list ===
Correct as of Round 10

Name	Injury	Date Return
(Australia) Mark Bridge	Hamstring Strain vs Melbourne Victory, Round 1	Round 4 v Central Coast Mariners
(Australia) Alex Brosque	Ankle (sustained at training), Midweek	Round 4 or Round 5
(Northern Ireland) Terry McFlynn	Hamstring (sustained at training), Midweek	Round 5 or Round 6
(Australia) Nick Carle	Toe Injury v Central Coast Mariners	Round 7
(South Korea) Byun Sung-Hwan	Hamstring Strain v North Queensland Fury	Round 10
(Australia) Nick Carle	Foot Injury v Brisbane Roar	Round 18

== See also ==
- Sydney FC
- Sydney FC season 2009-10
- A-League 2010-11
