= 2011–12 Sydney FC season =

Sydney FC
2011–2012 season
- Chairman: Paul Ramsay
- Manager: Vítězslav Lavička
- A-League: 5th
- Finals: Elimination final
- AFC Champions League: DNQ
- Top goalscorer: Bruno Cazarine (8 goals)
- Highest home attendance: 18,180 (Round 23 vs Melbourne Victory
- Lowest home attendance: 8,508 (Round 21 vs Perth Glory
- Average home league attendance: 13,420
| Home colours | Away colours |

The 2011–12 season was Sydney FC's seventh consecutive season in the Hyundai A-League since its foundation season in 2005–2006. The club will not compete in the 2012 AFC Champions League after failing to qualify during the previous season. The 2011–12 season also marks a new chapter in the history of the A-League, with new kit manufacturers for all teams. Reebok had held the rights to jersey manufacturing rights for the first six A-League seasons. Sydney FC announced Adidas as their new kit maker.

== 2011–12 A-League squad ==
Players included in a Sydney FC squad in the 2010–11 season Note: Flags indicate national team as defined under FIFA eligibility rules; some limited exceptions apply. Players may hold more than one non-FIFA nationality.

| No. | Pos. | Nation | Player |
|---|---|---|---|
| 1 | GK | AUS | Liam Reddy |
| 2 | DF | AUS | Sebastian Ryall |
| 3 | DF | AUS | Jamie Coyne |
| 4 | DF | NED | Pascal Bosschaart |
| 5 | DF | AUS | Michael Beauchamp |
| 6 | MF | JPN | Hirofumi Moriyasu |
| 7 | MF | AUS | Brett Emerton (Marquee) |
| 8 | MF | SVK | Karol Kisel |
| 9 | FW | BRA | Bruno Cazarine |
| 10 | FW | AUS | Nick Carle (Australian Marquee) |
| 11 | FW | AUS | Dimitri Petratos (Youth) |
| 12 | MF | AUS | Shannon Cole |

| No. | Pos. | Nation | Player |
|---|---|---|---|
| 15 | MF | NIR | Terry McFlynn (Captain) |
| 16 | MF | AUS | Joel Chianese (Youth) |
| 17 | MF | AUS | Terry Antonis (Youth) |
| 18 | FW | FIN | Juho Mäkelä |
| 19 | FW | AUS | Mark Bridge |
| 20 | GK | AUS | Ivan Necevski |
| 21 | MF | AUS | Scott Jamieson |
| 22 | DF | AUS | Nathan Sherlock |
| 23 | MF | AUS | Rhyan Grant (Youth) |
| 24 | FW | AUS | Mitchell Mallia (Youth) |
| 30 | GK | AUS | Ryan Norval |

== Transfers ==
=== In ===
| Player | From | Date | Fee |
|---|---|---|---|
| (Slovakia) Karol Kisel | (Czech Republic) Slavia Praha | 8 February 2011 | Free Transfer |
| (Australia) Jamie Coyne | (Australia) Perth Glory | 20 April 2011 | Free Transfer |
| (Australia) Michael Beauchamp | (Australia) Melbourne Heart | 20 April 2011 | Free Transfer |
| (Australia) Joel Chianese | (Australia) Sydney FC (Youth) | 17 May 2011 | Free Transfer |
| (Australia) Nathan Sherlock | (Australia) Sydney FC (Youth) | 17 May 2011 | Free Transfer |
| (Netherlands) Pascal Bosschaart | (Netherlands) ADO Den Haag | 17 June 2011 | Free Transfer |
| (Australia) Brett Emerton | (England) Blackburn Rovers | 25 August 2011 | Free Transfer |

=== Out ===
| Player | To | Date | Fee |
|---|---|---|---|
| (Australia) Matthew Jurman | (Australia) Brisbane Roar | 10 February 2011 | Free Transfer |
| (South Korea) Byun Sung-Hwan | (Australia) Newcastle Jets | 11 April 2011 | Released |
| (Switzerland) Stephan Keller | (Netherlands) Willem II | 6 July 2011 | Released |
| (Australia) Stuart Musialik | (Australia) Central Coast Mariners | 25 July 2011 | Released |
| (Australia) Andrew Durante | (New Zealand) Wellington Phoenix | 14 May 2011 | Loan return |
| (Australia) David Williams | (Australia) Melbourne Heart | 22 June 2011 | Free Transfer |
| (Australia) Kofi Danning | (Australia) Brisbane Roar | 27 June 2011 | Released |
| (Australia) Brendan Gan | (Australia) Bonnyrigg White Eagles | 4 July 2011 | Released |
| (Australia) Anthony Golec | (Australia) Sydney United | 30 June 2011 | Released |

=== Loan in ===
| Player | From | Date | Duration |

=== Loan out ===
| Player | To | Date | Duration |

== Events ==
=== May ===
- 10th: Jamie Coyne signs for Sydney FC from Perth Glory on a 2-year deal.
- 20th: Former chairman of the National Rugby League club Canterbury Bulldogs, Dirk Melton, is announced as the new CEO of Sydney FC.

=== July ===
- 18th: Sydney FC announce that Adidas will be replacing Reebok as their kit supplier, signing a 4-year deal.

=== August ===
- 3rd: Sydney FC play their first pre-season friendly in preparation for the 2011–12 season, and tie 1–1 with NSW Super League club Macarthur Rams at Campbelltown Stadium.
- 8th: Sydney FC reveal their new kits, as well us unveiling their 2011–12 Membership drive at Martin Place, Sydney CBD.
- 9th: Former Socceroos goalkeeper Zeljko Kalac is announced as the new Goalkeeping Coach of Sydney FC, replacing John Filan.
- 10th: Sydney FC win their first pre-season game of the 2011–12 campaign, with a comprehensive 3–0 victory over former NSL club St. George Saints Football Club at Kogarah Oval.
- 17th: Sydney FC thump NSW Premier League team Parramatta Eagles 6–0 at Parramatta Stadium.
- 24th: Sydney FC continue their pre-season undefeated run with a 4–2 win over Bankstown City Lions at Jensen Oval. Nick Carle scores a brace, giving him 5 goals in 2 games.
- 25th: Sydney FC announced Socceroo Brett Emerton as their second Marquee player. The announcement comes days after rival club Melbourne Victory announced they had signed Harry Kewell, whom it was believed Sydney FC was also chasing.
- 30th: New marquee signing Brett Emerton is unveiled, and presented with the #7 jersey.
- 30th: Sydney FC are humbled 3–0 by Sutherland Sharks at Seymour Shaw Park, Miranda making it the first loss of the pre-season for Sydney FC.

=== September ===
- 1st: Club stalwart and long time serviceman from season one Terry McFlynn is announced he will retain the captaincy for the upcoming season.
- 10th: Sydney FC go down to NSW Premier League club Sydney Olympic 1–0.
- 17th: Sydney FC lose their first pre-season game against A-League opposition going down to Newcastle Jets 1–0 in Cessnock.

=== October ===
- 8th: ROUND 1 v Melbourne Victory at Docklands Stadium finishes in a 0–0 draw. Striker Mark Bridge is sent off in the second half, following an incident with Rodrigo Vargas.
- 15th: ROUND 2 v Brisbane Roar at the Sydney Football Stadium, results in Sydney FC's first loss of the season, going down 2–0 to defending Premiers & Champions Brisbane. Goals from Besart Berisha and Thomas Broich either side of half time allowed the Roar to win their 30th consecutive game without defeat.
- 22nd: ROUND 3 v Adelaide United at Hindmarsh Stadium results in Sydney breaking their goal drought, and winning their first game of the season, with a come from behind 2–1 victory. Dario Vidosic put the Reds ahead after a mistake by defender Michael Beauchamp, however second half goals by Jamie Coyne, and Nick Carle allowed Sydney to post their first 3 points of the season.
- 29th: ROUND 4 v Melbourne Heart at AAMI Park sees Sydney FC salvage a 1–1 draw in the dying seconds of injury time. A scrappy affair played in torrential rain, both sides failed to take their chances. Heart opening the scoring with 5 minutes to play through Brazilian striker Maycon. However Sydney replied through Nick Carle who scored his second goal of the season, right at the death.

=== November ===
- 6th: ROUND 5 v Gold Coast United at the Sydney Football Stadium ends up with Sydney FC taking all 3 points in a miraculous second half comeback. Down 1–0 at half time, which was doubled to 2–0 seconds into the second half, 2 goals in as many minutes saw Bruno Cazarine and Nick Carle claw Sydney back to 2–2, before a penalty kick was awarded to Sydney FC deep into stoppage time. Karol Kisel converted, to give Sydney a 3–2 win. Gold Coast coach Miron Bleiberg accuses referee Peter Green of match fixing for "the sake of the game".
- 12th: ROUND 6 v Perth Glory at NIB Stadium sees Sydney win their second game on the trot, with a 1–0 win. Striker Mark Bridge giving the visitors all 3 points after converting a low cross from Nick Carle. The win moves Sydney FC into 2nd position on the ladder, at the time only 2 points behind reigning Premiers & Champions, and currently undefeated in 2011–12 team Brisbane.
- 19th: ROUND 7 v Central Coast Mariners at the Sydney Football Stadium results in a 3–2 loss to the Sky Blues, ending their 4-game unbeaten streak. The Mariners opened the scoring with a bullet free kick via Dutch import Patrick Zwaanswijk before extending the lead mid way into the 2nd half through New Zealand international Michael McGlinchey. Nick Carle however pulled one back, effectively scoring his 4th goal of the season, and for a short time it looked like a repeat of the 3–2 heroics against the Gold Coast a fortnight earlier, but those hopes were quashed when the Mariners striker Troy Hearfield put a third past Liam Reddy. In the dying minutes, Brett Emerton was fouled near the box, and he skillfully put the free kick up, and around the wall, scoring his first competitive goal in a Sydney FC shirt.
- 27th: ROUND 8 v Wellington Phoenix at Westpac Stadium, Wellington, New Zealand results in the second consecutive loss for the Sky Blues, going down 2–1 this time to New Zealand club Wellington Phoenix. Wellington were up 2–0 with goals through Paul Ifill and Tim Brown, before Sydney's Bruno Cazarine picked up his 2nd goal of the season with a consolation goal in the 70th minute. The loss means Sydney drop a further place down in the ladder to fourth, allowing rivals Central Coast Mariners and Melbourne Victory to move into 2nd and 3rd respectively after they won their games.

=== December ===
- 4th: ROUND 9 v Brisbane Roar at Jubilee Oval, Carlton in Sydney's South-East ends with Sydney FC defeating Brisbane 2–0, ending the current defending Premiers & Champions 36-game winning streak, which is a record in Australian sport. An early goal, after just 36 seconds from young striker Dimitri Petratos got Sydney underway. Marquee man Brett Emerton got a flukey second goal from a corner kick midway through the first half, which the wind took and blew into the Brisbane goal, despite the best efforts from Goalkeeper Michael Theoklitos and former Sydney FC defender Matthew Jurman. The loss ends Sydney's 2-game losing streak, and moves them back into 3rd position behind Central Coast Mariners.
- 7th: Sydney FC were supposed to be playing the Perth Glory at Campbelltown Stadium, Leumeah as part of the A-League's regional round. However, the match was postponed until further notice due to Perth Glory being unable to fly out from Perth Airport due to heavy storm activity in the area which prevented planes from arriving or departing to and from the airport. Due to the long distance between Sydney and Perth, the Glory are unable to fly the next morning.
- 11th: Round 10 v Gold Coast United at Skilled Park Robina on the Gold Coast ends up with a disappointing 0–0 draw for the Sky Blues, against a Gold Coast United outfit sitting last on the A-League ladder. The game was slightly marred post game, when it was revealed that Sydney FC defender Shannon Cole would be fined by the club, after being found guilty of Diving, breaching the clubs no tolerance policy regarding simulation, which is frowned upon by the world governing body FIFA and fans worldwide.
- 17th: Round 11 v Newcastle Jets at Ausgrid Stadium, Newcastle results in a come-from-behind victory against Sydney's Northern New South Wales rivals. The Jets scored first after dominating the first half-hour of the game via a strike from New Zealand international Jeremy Brockie before Sydney FC clawed their way back into the game. Brazilian striker Bruno Cazarine leveled the scoreline, 19 minutes into the second half, after a smart cross from Karol Kisel in front of goal, followed by a simple header from Finnish striker Juho Makela on 84 minutes. The game also marked the debut of youth player Mitchell Mallia who came on as a substitute in the second half.
- 22nd: Round 12 v Adelaide United at the Sydney Football Stadium, Moore Park saw Adelaide arrive in Sydney, having sacked their coach Rini Coolen only days previously. replacing him with Vitezslav Lavickas predecessor John Kosmina, who had also been Adelaide United manager from 2005 until 2007. The game finished 2–2, with Daniel Mullen opening the scoring for the Reds, following a brain explosion from Sydney FC captain Terry McFlynn who miskicked a back-pass which ended in a corner. Bruno Cazarine was brought down in the penalty area. Slovak Karol Kisel fired the ball home. In the second half Dario Vidosic won a penalty for the Reds, which he converted himself, however Sydney youth star Dimitri Petratos gave Sydney a share of the points when he fired home a ball from the edge of the penalty area, and took a glance off the inside of the post, ending the game 2–2.
- 29th: Round 13 v Melbourne Heart at the Sydney Football Stadium, Moore Park brought Sydney FC's largest crowd of the season thus far for the final game of the year. However, it was not to be a happy time for the Sky Blues, completely dominated from the opening whistle. Despite showing early promise through Brazilian Bruno Cazarine, the Heart opened the scoring through Eli Babalj in the 32nd minute. Heart doubled their advantage right on the stroke of half time, through Mate Dugandzic. The game was all but over for Sydney FC when Jason Hoffman made it 3–0. However Heart's Brazilian striker Alex Terra would have the laugh last in the dying minutes of the game when he made it 4–0 after Sydney FC goalkeeper dropped the ball right in front of him, in his eagerness to get the ball up the field after intercepting the cross, Terra calmly dribbled the ball to the goal line before booting it in the net, ending the rout and a painful 90 minutes for the harbour team. The loss would also see Wellington leapfrog them into 4th, with Sydney dropping into 5th.

=== January ===
- 4th: Round 14 – Big Wednesday v Wellington Phoenix at Westpac Stadium, Wellington, New Zealand saw Sydney travel to the "Cake-Tin" for the second time the season, in the hope of burying the memories of their previous game with a win. However, it was not to be despite Sydney FC getting the scoring underway via a penalty from Brett Emerton. Goals from Daniel, Dani Sanchez, Ben Sigmund and Paul Ifill would see Sydney FC concede 4 goals for the second week in a row. Bruno Cazaerine added a 2nd goal for Sydney in the second half, but it would be nothing more than a mere consolation goal, for a team struggling to find at consistency at the back, or in front of goal.
- 8th: Round 15 v Central Coast Mariners at Sydney Football Stadium, Moore Park saw a short turn around of just 4 days after the mid-week round, and had Sydney FC facing the table topping Mariners in what would be considered to be a crucial game for Sydney coach Vitezslav Lavicka who it was revealed had 4-weeks remaining to turn the season around, or face an inevitable axing once the season had finished. With the passing of one of Sydney's most loyal fans, "Doggadog" who was remembered with a minutes silence before the game, it was expected that Sydney would lift and play hard against their South NSW Derby rivals from the very start. However, this was not the case, with Sydney struggling to find any cohesion within themselves, and as has been the story for so many games this season, they went behind first through Central Coast's birthday boy Oliver Bozanic who was given too much room and buried the ball in the net. The Second half would show a much better performance from Sydney FC, having the best part of the possession and chances, however the Mariners defence held strong, and the score remained the same until the final whistle, leaving Sydney with 1 point from their last 5 games.
- 14th: Round 16 v Brisbane Roar at Suncorp Stadium, Brisbane, Queensland sees Sydney FC travel north of the border the venue where they have failed to win since early 2007. A goal from Mark Bridge not only ended his goal scoring drought, but also allowed the Sydney FC team to believe they might get their first win in 4 years. However, the dream was to be shattered, late into Extra Time, when former Bahraini criminal Sayed Mohamed Adnan scored from a free kick. A now rejuvenated Brisbane, refused to lay down against a tiring Sydney FC defence, and Albanian Besart Berisha scored from a suspicious handball cross from Mitch Nichols to seal a 2–1 victory and all 3 points against a Sydney FC team who were shocked at not taking him the 3 points.
- '19th: Community Round v Perth Glory at Campbelltown Stadium, Leumeah saw Sydney play Perth a month later than originally planned. Due to the 5:30 pm kick-off many fans were unable to attend. Sydney FC took the lead once more just before the half time interval, and once more Sydney fans held their breath in the hope of taking away 3 points and hopefully kick starting their season which had seemingly stalled, having lost 5 on the trot. However, it scenes becoming all to familiar Sydney's defence fell asleep in the dying minutes of the half, and conceded what was arguably a soft goal from a corner, levelling the scores at 1–1, to the final whistle.
- 23rd: Round 17 v Gold Coast United at Sydney Football Stadium, Moore Park. After 6 games without a win, Sydney FC finally got a much needed 3 points against a Gold Coast team who were coming last on the ladder. However, the match started with familiar scenes with Gold Coast opening the scoring through Ben Halloran in the 55th minute, it looked like Sydney FC would never be able to control a game for 90 minutes. However a late comeback saw Slovak Import Karol Kisel peg a goal back in the 71st minute, before turning provider in the 81st for Brazilian Bruno Cazarine in the 89th minute. The win moved Sydney back into finals contention having dropped out of the 6.
- 26th (Australia Day): Round 18: v Melbourne Victory at AAMI Park, Melbourne. The City Derby clash between Sydney and Melbourne always brings excitement and entertaining football between the two rival clubs, and this game, billed on Australia Day was no exception. Both Sydney and Melbourne were having poor seasons, and struggling to make it into finals contention, and 3 points to either side would have done a good deal to getting either team into the finals. Melbourne Victory looked the team to do it, with a double blow just before half time through Isaka Cernak and Fabio gave the hosts a convincing 2–0 lead at half time. However Melbourne's weakness this season is their ability to hold onto a lead, and once again they failed. Bruno Cazarine pegged a goal back for Sydney, scoring his 2nd in as many games, and his 6th for the season, and right at the death from a free kick, former Melbourne Victory player Sebastian Ryall scored his first ever professional goal, giving Sydney a hard earned and well fought for point away from home.

=== February ===
- 3rd: Manager Vitezslav Lavicka announces at a press conference that he will not renew his contract for next season, as he will be leaving the club at the end of the 2011–12 season, citing personal reasons.
- 5th: Round 20: v Newcastle Jets at Sydney Football Stadium, Moore Park has Sydney concede 5 goals for the first time in 4 years as they lost 5–2. First half goals from former Sydney FC players Nikolai Topor-Stanley, Ruben Zadkovich and Jeremy Brockie see Sydney FC slump to a 3–0 deficit at half time. The second half saw a small comeback fought, with Hirofumi Moriyasu and Michael Beauchamp scoring their first goals of the season to bring it back to 3–2, however two further late goals from Brockie and Ali Abbas Al-Hilfi gave Sydney a loss nobody expected.
- 11th: Round 21: v Perth Glory at Sydney Football Stadium, Moore Park has Sydney win a tightly fought contest, their fourth home win of the season. After being locked in 0–0 at half time, stand in captain for suspended Terry McFlynn, Brett Emerton scored the opener firing home a cross from Karol Kisel. Emerton turned scorer into provider, when he set up a cross which saw Bruno Cazarine header the ball into the Danny Vukovic who could only push the ball into the roof of the net, thus scoring his 7th of the season. Perth got a late consolation goal through Billy Mehmet but Sydney held out to win 2–1.

== Preseason ==
| 3 August 2011 | Macarthur Rams | 1–1 | Sydney FC | Campbelltown Stadium |
| Wednesday, 7:30pm | Saddler 67' | Report | Cazarine 55' | Attendance: 2,349 |

| 10 August 2011 | St. George F.C. | 0–3 | Sydney FC | Jubilee Oval |
| Wednesday, 7:30pm | | Report | Bridge 40'; Cazarine 50'; Rufer 83' (pen.) | Attendance: 2,352 |

| 17 August 2011 | Parramatta Eagles | 0–6 | Sydney FC | Parramatta Stadium |
| Wednesday, 7:30pm | | Report | Carle 27' (pen.), 47', 60' (pen.); Bridge 48'; Rufer 86'; Makela 88' | Attendance: ~2,000 |

| 24 August 2011 | Bankstown City | 2–4 | Sydney FC | Jensen Oval |
| Wednesday, 7:30pm | Salameh 43' (pen.); Gardiner 55' | Report | Moriyasu 36'; Carle 51', 59' (pen.); Petratos 67' | Attendance: 1,251; Referee: Kevin Peddie |

| 31 August 2011 | Sutherland Sharks | 3–0 | Sydney FC | Seymour Shaw Park |
| Wednesday, 7:30pm | Nikas 47' (pen.); McGanty 70'; Cahill 90' | Report | | Attendance: ~2,000; Referee: Strebre Delovski |

| 10 September 2011 | Sydney Olympic FC | 1–0 | Sydney FC | Belmore Oval |
| Saturday, 7:30pm | Smith 87' | Report | | Attendance: ~2,500; Referee: Kris Griffith-Jones |

| 17 September 2011 | Newcastle Jets | 1–0 | Sydney FC | Cessnock Sports Ground |
| Saturday, 5:00pm | Virgili 43' | Report | | Attendance: 1,786; Referee: Stuart Wolfe |

| 24 September 2011 | Sydney FC | 2–2 | Perth Glory | Jubilee Oval |
| Saturday, 3:00pm | Carle 19'; Emerton 49' (pen.) | | Mehmet 35'; Howarth 52' | Attendance: 3,577 |

== 2011–12 Hyundai A-League ==
| 8 October 2011 | Melbourne Victory | 0–0 | Sydney FC | Etihad Stadium, Melbourne |
| Saturday, 6:30pm AEST | | Report; Summary | Bridge (red card) 73' | Attendance: 40,351; Referee: Peter Green |

| 15 October 2011 | Sydney FC | 0–2 | Brisbane Roar | Sydney Football Stadium, Moore Park |
| Saturday, 7:30pm AEST | | Report | Berisha 42'; Broich 70' | Attendance: 15,789; Referee: Strebre Delovski |

| 22 October 2011 | Adelaide United | 1–2 | Sydney FC | Hindmarsh Stadium, Adelaide |
| Saturday, 5.30pm AEST | Vidosic 28' | Report | Coyne 60'; Carle 81' | Attendance: 12,504; Referee: Gerard Parsons |

| 29 October 2011 | Melbourne Heart | 1–1 | Sydney FC | AAMI Park, Melbourne |
| Saturday, 7.30pm AEST | Maycon 88' | Report | Carle 90+4' | Attendance: 5,666; Referee: Chris Beath |

| 6 November 2011 | Sydney FC | 3–2 | Gold Coast United | Sydney Football Stadium, Moore Park |
| Sunday, 5.00pm AEST | Cazarine 60'; Carle 63'; Kisel 90+4' (pen.) | Report | Rees 22'; Macallister 46' | Attendance: 11,051; Referee: Peter Green |

| 12 November 2011 | Perth Glory | 0–1 | Sydney FC | NIB Stadium, Perth |
| Saturday, 7.30pm AWST | | Report | Bridge 45' | Attendance: 9,046; Referee: Gerard Parsons |

| 19 November 2011 | Sydney FC | 2–3 | Central Coast Mariners | Sydney Football Stadium, Moore Park |
| Saturday, 7.45pm AEST | Carle 77'; Emerton 88' | Report | Zwaanswijk 40'; McGlinchey 66'; Hearfield 82' | Attendance: 13,947; Referee: Strebre Delovski |

| 27 November 2011 | Wellington Phoenix | 2–1 | Sydney FC | Westpac Stadium, Wellington, New Zealand |
| Sunday, 2:00pm AEST | Ifill 7'; Brown 59' | Report | Cazarine 70' | Attendance: 6,308; Referee: Ryan Shepard |

| 4 December 2011 | Sydney FC | 2–0 | Brisbane Roar | Jubilee Oval, Carlton† |
| Sunday, 4.30pm AEST | Petratos 1'; Emerton 19' | Report | | Attendance: 11,555; Referee: Peter Green |

| 11 December 2011 | Gold Coast United | 0–0 | Sydney FC | Skilled Park, Robina |
| Sunday, 7.30pm AEST | | Report | | Attendance: 2,984; Referee: Ben Williams |

| 17 December 2011 | Newcastle Jets | 1–2 | Sydney FC | Ausgrid Stadium, Newcastle |
| Saturday, 5.30pm AEST | Brockie 25' | Report | Cazarine 59'; Makela 84' | Attendance: 13,658 |

| 22 December 2011 | Sydney FC | 2–2 | Adelaide United | Sydney Football Stadium, Moore Park |
| Thursday, 7.30pm AEST | Kisel 19' (pen.); Petratos 66' | Report | Mullen 7'; Vidosic 56' (pen.) | Attendance: 10,212; Referee: Jarred Gillett |

| 29 December 2011 | Sydney FC | 0–4 | Melbourne Heart | Sydney Football Stadium, More Park |
| Thursday, 6.30pm AEST | | Report | Babalj 32'; Duganzic 45+1'; Hoffman 76'; Terra 86' | Attendance: 16,007; Referee: Peter Green |

| 4 January 2012 | Wellington Phoenix | 4–2 | Sydney FC | Westpac Stadium, Wellington |
| Wednesday, 1.00pmm AEST | Daniel 26' (pen.); Sanchez 42'; Sigmund 79'; Ifill 90+4' | Report | Emerton 16' (pen.); Cazarine 63' |

| 8 January 2012 | Sydney FC | 0–1 | Central Coast Mariners | Sydney Football Stadium, Moore Park |
| Sunday, 4.00pm AEST | | Report | Bozanic 8' | Attendance: 11,866; Referee: Jared Gillett |

| 14 January 2012 | Brisbane Roar | 2–1 | Sydney FC | Suncorp Stadium, Brisbane, Queensland |
| Saturday, 7.30pm AEST | Adnan 90+4'; Besart Berisha 90+5' | Report | Bridge 39' | Attendance: 14,545 |

| 18 January 2012 | Sydney FC | 1–1 | Perth Glory | Campbelltown Stadium, Leumeah |
| Wednesday, 5.30pm AEST | Bridge 45+1' | Report | Hughes 88' | Attendance: 5,505; Referee: Matthew Gillett |

| 22 January 2012 | Sydney FC | 2–1 | Gold Coast United | Sydney Football Stadium, Moore Park |
| Sunday, 5.30pm AEST | Kisel 71'; Cazarine 89' | Report | Ben Halloran 55' |

| 26 January 2012 | Melbourne Victory | 2–2 | Sydney FC | AAMI Park, Melbourne |
| Thursday, 5.00pm AEST | Cernak 45'; Fabio 45+1' | Report | Cazarine 56'; Ryall 90' | Attendance: ~20,000; Referee: Strebre Delovski |

| 5 February 2012 | Sydney FC | 2–5 | Newcastle Jets | Sydney Football Stadium, Moore Park |
| Sunday, 5.00pm AEST | Moriyasu 47'; Beauchamp 72' | Report | Topor-Stanley 22'; Zadkovich 29'; Brockie 39', 87'; Al-Hilfi 90+6' | Attendance: 10,232 |

| 11 February 2012 | Sydney FC | 2–1 | Perth Glory | Sydney Football Stadium, Moore Park |
| Saturday, 7.45pm AEST | Emerton 54'; Cazarine 72' | Report | Mehmet 86' | Attendance: 8,508 |

| 19 February 2012 | Adelaide United | 1–2 | Sydney FC | Hindmarsh Stadium, Adelaide, SA |
| Sunday, 7.00pm AEST | Barbiero 56 | | Chianese 45, Mallia 81 | Attendance: 8,259 |

| 25 February 2012 | Sydney FC | 0–1 | Wellington Phoenix | Sydney Football Stadium, Moore Park |
| Sunday, 5.00pm AEST | | | Ifill 13 | Attendance: 10,165 |

| 3 March 2012 | Central Coast Mariners | 1–1 | Sydney FC | Bluetongue Stadium, Gosford |
| Saturday, 7.30pm AEST | Hearfield 90 | | Chianese 56 | Attendance: 8,658 |

| 10 March 2012 | Sydney FC | 1–0 | Melbourne Victory | Sydney Football Stadium, Moore Park |
| Saturday, 7.45pm AEST | Kisel 32 | | | Attendance: 18,200 |

| 17 March 2012 | Melbourne Heart | 2–2 | Sydney FC | AAMI Stadium, Melbourne |
| Saturday, 7.45pm AEST | Dugandzic 32 Babalj 36 | | Cole 65, 76 | Attendance: 7,498 |

| 23 March 2012 | Sydney FC | 3–2 | Newcastle Jets | Sydney Football Stadium, Moore Park |
| SUnday, 5.30pm AEST | Cazarine 12, Chianese 31, 33 | | Bridges 26, Wheelhouse 84 | Attendance: 14,500 |

†The Round 9 fixture against the Brisbane Roar was moved from the Sydney Football Stadium to Jubilee Oval due to an Eminem concert being held at the Sydney Football Stadium on the same day

†The Round 10, regional fixture against Perth Glory was postponed until further notice, due to the Perth squad unable to leave Perth Airport due to bad weather.

== Statistics ==
=== Goal scorers ===
| Rank | Scorer | Goals |
|---|---|---|
| 1 | (Brazil) Bruno Cazarine | 8 |
| 2 | (Australia) Joel Chianese | 4 |
| 2 | (Australia) Nick Carle | 4 |
| 2 | (Slovakia) Karol Kisel | 4 |
| 2 | (Australia) Brett Emerton | 4 |
| 6 | (Australia) Mark Bridge | 3 |
| 7 | (Australia) Dimitri Petratos | 2 |
| 7 | (Australia) Shannon Cole | 2 |
| 9 | (Australia) Jamie Coyne | 1 |
| 9 | (Australia) Sebastian Ryall | 1 |
| 9 | (Finland) Juho Makela | 1 |
| 9 | (Australia) Michael Beauchamp | 1 |
| 9 | (Australia) Mitchell Mallia | 1 |
| 9 | (Japan) Hirofumi Moriyasu | 1 |

=== Disciplinary record ===
Correct as of Round 14

| Name | Yellow card | Yellow card Red card | Red card |
|---|---|---|---|
| (Australia) Mark Bridge | 0 | 0 | 1 |
| (Australia) Nick Carle | 3 | 0 | 0 |
| (Australia) Scott Jamieson | 5 | 0 | 0 |
| (Northern Ireland) Terry McFlynn | 5 | 0 | 0 |
| (Australia) Michael Beauchamp | 2 | 0 | 0 |
| (Australia) Brett Emerton | 1 | 0 | 0 |
| (Australia) Shannon Cole | 1 | 0 | 0 |
| (Australia) Liam Reddy | 1 | 0 | 0 |
| (Australia) Terry Antonis | 1 | 0 | 0 |
| (Australia) Jamie Coyne | 2 | 0 | 0 |
| (Netherlands) Pascal Bosschaart | 2 | 0 | 0 |
| (Slovakia) Karol Kisel | 5 | 0 | 0 |
| (Brazil) Bruno Cazarine | 2 | 0 | 0 |
| (Finland) Juho Makela | 1 | 0 | 0 |

=== Home Crowds ===
| Round | Opponent | Attendance |
|---|---|---|
| 2 | Brisbane | 15,789 |
| 5 | Gold Coast United | 11,051 |
| 7 | Central Coast | 13,947 |
| 9 | Brisbane | 11,555 |
| 12 | Adelaide United | 10,212 |
| 13 | Melbourne Heart | 16,007 |
| 16 | Gold Coast | 8,550 |
| 18 | Newcastle | 10,232 |
| 20 | Perth | 8,508 |
| 22 | Wellington | 10,208 |
| 25 | Melbourne Victory | 18,200 |
| 27 | Newcastle | 15,005 |

†The Round 9 fixture against the Brisbane Roar was moved from the Sydney Football Stadium to Jubilee Oval due to an Eminem concert being held at the Sydney Football Stadium on the same day .

=== Results by round ===
| Round | 1 | 2 | 3 | 4 | 5 | 6 | 7 | 8 | 9 | 10 | 11 | 12 | 13 | 14 | 15 | 16 | 17 | 18 | 19 | 20 | 21 | 22 | 23 | 24 | 25 | 26 | 27 |
|---|---|---|---|---|---|---|---|---|---|---|---|---|---|---|---|---|---|---|---|---|---|---|---|---|---|---|---|
| Ground | A | H | A | A | H | A | H | A | H | H† | | | | | | | | | | | | | | | | | |
| Result | D | L | W | D | W | W | L | L | W | D | W | D | L | L | L | L | D | W | D | L | W | W | L | D | W | D | W |
| Position | 5 | 9 | 5 | 6 | 4 | 2 | 3 | 4 | 3 | | | | | | | | | | | | | | | | | | |

Updated to match(es) played on 6 Nov 2011. Source: Competitive Matches
A = Away; H = Home; W = Win; D = Draw; L = Loss

| Pos | Team | Pld | W | D | L | GF | GA | GD | Pts | Qualification |
|---|---|---|---|---|---|---|---|---|---|---|
| 1 | Central Coast Mariners | 27 | 15 | 6 | 6 | 40 | 24 | +16 | 51 | Qualification for 2013 AFC Champions League group stage and finals series (Note: First place qualifies for the 2013 AFC Champions League group stage. Winning the 2012 A-League Grand Final automatically earns qualification for the 2013 AFC Champions League qualifying play-off, unless first place are champions.) |
| 2 | Brisbane Roar (C) | 27 | 14 | 7 | 6 | 50 | 28 | +22 | 49 | Qualification for 2013 AFC Champions League qualifying play-off and finals series |
| 3 | Perth Glory | 27 | 13 | 4 | 10 | 40 | 35 | +5 | 43 | Qualification for Finals series |
| 4 | Wellington Phoenix | 27 | 12 | 4 | 11 | 34 | 32 | +2 | 40 | Qualification for Finals series |
| 5 | Sydney FC | 27 | 10 | 8 | 9 | 37 | 42 | −5 | 38 | Qualification for Finals series |
| 6 | Melbourne Heart | 27 | 9 | 10 | 8 | 35 | 34 | +1 | 37 | Qualification for Finals series |
| 7 | Newcastle Jets | 27 | 10 | 5 | 12 | 38 | 41 | −3 | 35 | |
| 8 | Melbourne Victory | 27 | 6 | 11 | 10 | 35 | 43 | −8 | 29 | |
| 9 | Adelaide United | 27 | 5 | 10 | 12 | 26 | 44 | −18 | 25 | |
| 10 | Gold Coast United | 27 | 4 | 9 | 14 | 30 | 42 | −12 | 21 | |

Source: ultimatealeague.com
Rules for classification: 1) points; 2) goal difference; 3) number of goals scored.
(C) Champions

== End-of-season awards ==
On 26 April 2012, Sydney FC hosted their annual Sky Blue Ball and presented six awards on the night.

| Award | Men's | Women's | Youth |
|---|---|---|---|
| Player of the Year | Ivan Necevski | N/A | |
| Clubman of the Year | Terry McFlynn | N/A | |
| Player's Player of the Year | N/A | Teresa Polias | Hagi Gligor |
| Fan's Player of the Year | Nick Carle | N/A | |
| Golden Boot | Bruno Cazarine | N/A | |
