= Sydney Festival of Football =

Tournament details
- Host country: Australia
- Dates: 25–31 July
- Teams: 4 (from 2 confederations)
- Venue: 1 (in 1 host city)

Final positions
- Champions: (Greece) AEK Athens (1st title)

Tournament statistics
- Matches played: 6
- Goals scored: 17 (2.83 per match)
- Attendance: 38,873 (6,479 per match)
- Top scorer(s): (Australia) Alex Brosque (3 goals)

The Sydney Festival of Football was an association football friendly tournament competition hosted by A-League club Sydney FC in 2010, held in Sydney and funded by the Events NSW department of the New South Wales Government.

It was intended to be an annual event, with Sydney FC contracted as the Australian side for 3 years, but poor attendance from Sydney FC fans caused the event to make a loss and plans for future tournaments were scrapped. The event has not been held since and no plans have been made to revive the competition.

The first and only tournament to take place so far occurred from 25 to 31 July 2010, contested by English Premier League club Blackburn Rovers, Rangers from the Scottish Premier League and AEK Athens from Super League Greece, who eventually won the tournament.

== History ==
The idea of an international club tournament hosted by Sydney FC was first brought up soon after the 2009–10 A-League season in which Sydney FC took out the Premiership & Championship. Sydney had been keen to participate once more in the Pan-Pacific Championship however for unknown reasons the 2010 edition was not played. At the time it was revealed that they would be playing Everton, however rumours floated around a pre-season tournament between Sydney FC, Blackburn Rovers, Rangers and Argentinian giants Boca Juniors. However this fell through when it was announced that Boca Juniors would only be playing Melbourne Victory and Wellington Phoenix on their tour of Australia and New Zealand.

Soon afterwards it was rumoured that Super League Greece club AEK Athens would be going to Australia to play a friendly in either Sydney or Melbourne, due to their large Greek communities. It was announced on 4 June 2010, that the tournament would be held between 25 and 31 July. The announcement was made by New South Wales Premier Kristina Keneally, Sydney FC CEO Edwin Lugt, as well as Sydney FC players Terry McFlynn and Liam Reddy with manager Vitezslav Lavicka.

== Results ==
Year	Venue	Winner	Runner-up	3rd place	4th place
2010	SFS, Sydney	(Greece) AEK Athens	(England) Blackburn Rovers	(Scotland) Rangers FC	(Australia) Sydney FC

== Teams ==
The teams who accepted the invitations are:

- (Australia) Sydney FC – A-League (host)
- (England) Blackburn Rovers – Premier League
- (Scotland) Rangers – Scottish Premier League
- AEK Athens – Super League Greece

== Venue ==
All the games were played at the Sydney Football Stadium a 45,000 seat multi-use venue, home ground of hosts Sydney FC, as well as several National Rugby League teams. The ground has seen host to many internationals including Socceroos games, as well as being one of the stadiums used for the 2000 Summer Olympics in Sydney.

== Point system ==
To create exciting attacking football, there is a new way of gaining points for the tournament. The standard rules which applied for the tournament being (3 points = Win, 1 Point = Draw, 0 points = Loss), however 1 point would be awarded for each goal during the tournament. So even if a team loses, they would still gain points. For example:

- Sydney FC (2) – AEK Athens (1)

Sydney FC would receive the standard 3 points for the win plus 2 points for scoring 2 goals, meaning Sydney FC would receive 5 points in total. AEK Would receive just the 1 point for the goal.

=== Ladder ===
Pos	Team	Pld	W	D	L	GF	GA	GD	Pts	AEK	BLA	RAN	SYD
1	(Greece) AEK Athens	3	3	0	0	8	4	+4	17		2–1	1–0	—
2	(England) Blackburn Rovers	3	1	0	2	4	5	−1	7	—		—	—
3	(Scotland) Rangers	3	1	1	1	2	2	0	6	—	2–1		—
4	(Australia) Sydney FC	3	0	1	2	4	7	−3	5	3–5	1–2	0–0	

Source: sydneyfestivaloffootball.com.au
Legend: Blue = home team win; Yellow = draw; Red = away team win.

== Events ==
=== Match Day One ===
==== Sydney FC V AEK Athens ====
On an overcast day over 14,153 showed up to the Football Stadium to watch local team Sydney FC take on Super League Greece giants AEK Athens. The match started out an arm wrestle, with both sides taking their time to adjust to the tempo of the match. However the deadlock would be broken on 30 minutes when Brazilian striker Leonardo scored to give AEK the lead, however Sydney would strike back minutes later when Pantelis Kafes hand balled in the box, and Sydney striker Alex Brosque put the ball calmly down the middle to level the scores at 1–1. AEK would take the lead soon after in the 37th minute when Ismael Blanco scored a header from a corner to put the Greeks up 2–1. A mistake early on in the second half by AEK goalkeeper Giannis Arabatzis allowed Brosque to grab his second, and level Sydney back up at 2–2. However the game would be blown open with 3 goals by Ignacio Scocco, Nikos Liberopoulos, and Pantelis Kafes, with goals in the 60th, 74th, and 77th minutes respectively. Sydney would strike late in the game via Senegalese triallist Ibrahima Thiam in the 88th when he headed from close range to finish the scoring at 5–3.

==== Rangers V Blackburn Rovers ====
The second match of Match Day One would see Scottish Champions Rangers take on Blackburn Rovers who boasted 2 Socceroos players in Brett Emerton and Vince Grella. The match started off quietly however as Blackburn had landed in Australia only 24 hours previously showed plenty of tiredness and weakness, and conceded in the 11th minute through USA international Maurice Edu. Blackburn would go 2–0 down soon before half time when Kenny Miller took advantage of sloppy defence and fired in from close range in the 44th. Blackburn came out stronger in the second half however, they conceded a penalty in the 61st. A rush of blood from Kenny Miller however saw him fire the ball into the crossbar and out, but 3-minute's later Rangers themselves would concede a penalty down the other end of the park when David Dunn was brought down inside the box thanks to a late tackle. He made no mistake in converting his own penalty, giving Blackburn some hope halfway through the 2nd half 2–1 down. However, despite both sides pressing the issue the score remained the same, finishing 2–1 at full time.

=== Match Day Two ===
==== AEK Athens V Blackburn Rovers ====
On a wet, damp cold Wednesday evening and a crown of 9,483, AEK faced off against Blackburn, AEK hoping to secure the points which would most likely see them take out the first ever Sydney Festival of Football. The match started out evenly, both sides struggling to adjust to the muddy and slipper conditions, however it would be AEK Athens who adjusted the quickest, killing off Blackburn with a stunning double blow in 5 minutes, as Australian midfielder Nathan Burns set up Argentinian striker Ignacio Scocco brilliantly after flying past his man down the wing and sending in a cross, easily put away by Scocco to send AEK up 1–0. As the conditions got worse, the match was nearly interrupted when several flood lights in the Sydney Football Stadium went out, however the game continued, and minutes later Burns set up his second assist allowing Nikos Liberopoulos his second of the tournament. The game would be stuck in a stalemate until the last 10 minutes when Blackburn got their second wind, and ultimately their consolation goal through Phil Jones. The match finished 2–1, with AEK Athens all but sealing the championship, extending their lead to 13 points, 7 in front of Rangers.

==== Sydney FC V Rangers ====
If the earlier match was played in miserable wet conditions, the Sydney FC – Rangers match was played in atrocious conditions. The heavy rain had held off until now, despite it raining all day, and the entire 90 minutes was played out in near monsoonal conditions. Both teams struggled on a pitch which had had 3 games played on it without repair, and the rain made it worse. Both sides had minimal chances, however Sydney FC had the first real chance when Mark Bridge managed to get past his man on the edge of the 18-yard box after 20 minutes, however his shot was fired straight at the keeper. The best chance of the second half also went to Sydney with Senegalese triallist Ibrahima Iyane Thiam, who had scored in the match against AEK Athens, when he lifted a curling ball which looked to be going in, only to be denied by the fingertips of the goalkeeper. There was a scare in the second half for Sydney FC when Swiss defender Stephan Keller limped off with what looked to be a hamstring injury, a major worry for manager Vitezslav Lavicka with 10 days until the kickoff of the A-League. Despite both teams trying to make the most of the awful pitch, neither team could find the net and it remained 0–0, with both sides getting a point.

=== Match Day Three ===
==== AEK Athens V Rangers ====
Nathan Burns scored the only goal as AEK Athens won the first Sydney Festival of Football on the final day of the tournament.

Despite turning in a good performance in a very physical game, Rangers succumbed to a 72nd-minute goal from AEK Athens' Australian substitute, Nathan Burns.

==== Sydney FC V Blackburn Rovers ====
A-League Champions Sydney played out an entertaining 2–1 loss to English Premier League side Blackburn Rovers in the final game of the Sydney Festival of Football in which the Sydney-based team took to the pitch wearing black arm-bands, remembering the grandfather of defender Byun Sung-Hwan and grandmother of striker Mark Bridge, who both died during the week beginning 26 July 2010.

Sydney local Brett Emerton opened the scoring for Rovers in the 37th minute after gathering a Steven Nzonzi flick-on from a Gael Givet long ball. The Qantas Socceroos international experience showed as he chested the ball down calmly to turn and finish past goalkeeper Reddy.

In the 67th minute Blackburn substitutes Junior Hoilett and Keith Andrews combined well to find Pedersen who finished from close range to make it 2–0 to Blackburn.

The Sky Blues were to grab a consolation goal though as another fine attacking move saw Gan play a delicate ball through to Brosque who took a touch and finessed his shot past Bunn into the bottom right hand corner of the goal in the 81st minute.

Blackburn manager Sam Allardyce commented after the match that he would like to come back and compete in the 2011 Sydney Festival of Football. However this tournament would not go ahead.

== Matches ==
25 July 2010
12:45pm AEST

Sydney FC (Australia)	3–5	(Greece) AEK Athens
Brosque 33' (pen.), 48'; Thiam 89'	Report	Leonardo 30'; Blanco 37'; Liberopoulos 60'; Scocco 74'; Kafes 77'

Sydney Football Stadium
Attendance: 14,153
Referee: Ben Williams
25 July 2010
3:00pm AEST

Rangers (Scotland)	2–1	(England) Blackburn Rovers
Edu 11'; Miller 44'	Report	Dunn 64' (pen.)

Sydney Football Stadium
Attendance: 14,153
Referee: Peter Green

28 July 2010
6:00pm AEST

AEK Athens (Greece)	2–1	(England) Blackburn Rovers
Scocco 20'; Liberopoulos 24'	Report	Jones 82'

Sydney Football Stadium
Attendance: 9,483
Referee: Peter Green
28 July 2010
8:15pm AEST

Sydney FC (Australia)	0–0	(Scotland) Rangers
	Report

Sydney Football Stadium
Attendance: 9,483
Referee: Matthew Breeze

31 July 2010
5:00pm AEST

AEK Athens (Greece)	1–0	(Scotland) Rangers
Burns 78'	Report

Sydney Football Stadium
Attendance: 15,237
Referee: Matthew Breeze
31 July 2010
7:15pm AEST

Sydney FC (Australia)	1–2	(England) Blackburn Rovers
Brosque 81'	Report	Emerton 37'; Pedersen 67'

Sydney Football Stadium
Attendance: 15,237
Referee: Ben Williams

== Scorers ==
Name	Club	Goals
(Australia) Alex Brosque	Sydney FC	3
(Argentina) Ignacio Scocco	AEK Athens	2
(Greece) Nikos Liberopoulos	AEK Athens	2
(Argentina) Ismael Blanco	AEK Athens	1
(Brazil) Leonardo	AEK Athens	1
(Australia) Nathan Burns	AEK Athens	1
(Greece) Pantelis Kafes	AEK Athens	1
(Australia) Brett Emerton	Blackburn Rovers	1
(England) David Dunn	Blackburn Rovers	1
(England) Phil Jones	Blackburn Rovers	1
(Norway) Morten Gamst Pedersen	Blackburn Rovers	1
(Scotland) Kenny Miller	Rangers	1
(United States) Maurice Edu	Rangers	1
(Senegal) Ibrahima Iyane Thiam	Sydney FC	

Sydney Festival of Football
2010 Winners

AEK Athens
First Title
