= Liam Reddy =

Australian soccer player (born 1981)

- Liam Reddy

Personal information
- Full name: Liam Rhys Reddy
- Date of birth: 8 August 1981 (age 45)
- Place of birth: Sydney, Australia
- Height: 1.89 m (6 ft 2 in)
- Position: Goalkeeper

Team information
- Current team: Perth RedStar FC
- Number: 33

Youth career
- North Sutherland Rockets
- Sydney United
- 1997: SASI
- 1998–1999: AIS

Senior career*
Years	Team	Apps	(Gls)
2000–2003	Parramatta Power	39	(1)
2003–2005	Sydney United	24	(0)
2005–2006	Newcastle Jets	23	(0)
2006–2009	Brisbane Roar	66	(0)
2009–2010	Wellington Phoenix	12	(0)
2010–2012	Sydney FC	37	(0)
2012–2013	Esteghlal	0	(0)
2013	Sydney United	19	(0)
2013–2015	Central Coast Mariners	52	(0)
2015–2016	Western Sydney Wanderers	6	(0)
2016–2023	Perth Glory	154	(0)
2023–	Perth RedStar FC	89	(0)
- * Club domestic league appearances and goals as of 30 May 2026

Liam Rhys Reddy (born 8 August 1981) is an Australian professional soccer player who plays as a goalkeeper for NPL WA club Perth RedStar FC. He is also currently the goalkeeping coach for the Young Socceroos.

With 350 appearances, Reddy is the A-League's most capped goalkeeper, and sixth most capped player, and has 90 career clean sheets in the A-League, the second most of any A-League goalkeeper behind Danny Vukovic.

== Early life ==
Reddy comes from a successful sports family. His father is Australian former rugby league international and St George Dragons forward Rod Reddy, and he is the brother of rugby league player Joel Reddy and Adelaide Thunderbirds netball goalkeeper Bianca Reddy.

== Club career ==
Reddy played for the Newcastle Jets in the inaugural A-League season. He left Newcastle after falling out with the coach Nick Theo. Reddy's father Rod Reddy had previously engaged in physical altercation with Theo, while Liam was playing for Parramatta Power. Reddy signed a two-year deal with the Brisbane Roar at the commencement of the 2006/07 season. He played his junior career with the North Sutherland Rockets until the under twelves, when he was scouted by Sydney United

=== Wellington Phoenix ===
Brisbane Roar reported in December 2009 that Reddy would be released at the end of the season at his own request. This was subsequently brought forward to an immediate release and Reddy signed with the Wellington Phoenix for the remainder of the season as injury cover for the Phoenix's All Whites goalkeeper Mark Paston. Reddy's debut for the Phoenix was an away fixture against Adelaide United which ended as a draw. Reddy's second game was against Central Coast Mariners where he kept his first clean sheet for the Phoenix.

Reddy went on to play in the next two home fixtures for the Phoenix and he played a pivotal role in winning both of the matches. Reddy was named 'Player of the Day' for his contributions in the Phoenix's 3–0 win against North Queensland Fury. Reddy helped the Phoenix get back on track with their play-off hopes with his third clean sheet in Wellington colours against Adelaide United. This clean sheet was much needed for the Phoenix having conceded six goals in the previous two matches against Melbourne Victory and Perth Glory.

Reddy currently holds the Wellington Phoenix record for most consecutive clean sheets after he kept three clean sheets against Adelaide United, Gold Coast United and Central Coast Mariners. The Phoenix won all three of those matches and secured an historic play-off against Perth Glory. In that play-off, the game finished 1–1 with Chris Greenacre grabbing a goal. In the penalty shoot-out, Reddy made two brilliant saves and sent the Phoenix to a home semi-final against Newcastle Jets. Even though Reddy was with the Phoenix for a short period of time, playing a total of only 12 matches. Reddy was a favourite with the Wellington fans when he was announced as one of the finalists for the Members' Player of the Year.

=== Sydney FC ===
It was announced by Sydney FC that Reddy had signed a 3-year contract with the club. Reddy contested for the No. 1 Jersey, with Ivan Necevski who has been the reserve keeper for Sydney FC for several years. He was controversially sent off against the Central Coast Mariners after referee Matthew Breeze deemed he had tripped Mariners midfielder Patricio Pérez. However, the Match Review Panel expunged the red card as well as the mandatory 1-week suspension, after deeming Perez had dived to win the penalty. He played his first game back since October against the Melbourne Heart.

On 29 March 2012 Reddy was sent home from a trip to New Zealand after allegedly being drunk on the plane trip over. He was subsequently suspended from the rest of the 2011–12 finals campaign. On 13 April 2012, Reddy's contract was terminated by Sydney FC immediately due to 'serious misconduct'.

=== Esteghlal ===
On 22 July 2012, according to Iranian news media reports, he joined the Iranian Premier League club, Esteghlal with a two-year contract but he left the club in January 2013 without playing any matches for them.

=== Return to Australia ===
After failing to make a single appearance for Esteghlal, Reddy returned to Australia, where he promptly signed for Sydney United in the NSW Premier League.

=== Central Coast Mariners ===
On 23 August 2013, Reddy signed a one-year deal with then A-League champions, the Central Coast Mariners. On 15 March 2014, Reddy signed a two-year contract extension with the Gosford-based club after a series of strong performances.

On 10 December 2015, Central Coast Mariners parted ways with Reddy by mutual consent for disciplinary reasons which occurred 2 months previously. Reddy had been dropped from the club following the incidents, and had been training in isolation away from the team.

=== Western Sydney Wanderers ===
On 13 December 2015, Western Sydney Wanderers announced that they had signed Reddy as a goalkeeper for the remainder of the 2015–16 season. At the conclusion of his contract at the end of the season, Reddy was released by Western Sydney Wanderers after playing 6 matches.

=== Perth Glory ===
Reddy signed with Perth Glory in June 2016, his seventh A-League club (a record).

In March 2020, Reddy became the first goalkeeper in A-League history, and the fourth player overall, to reach 300 A-League appearances. Reddy made his 350th A-League appearance on 2 January 2023, in what turned out to be his final match for Perth Glory.

== A-League career statistics ==
As of 9 May 2016

CS = Clean Sheets

Club	Season	League		Cup		Asia^{1}		Total	
Club	Season	Apps	CS	Apps	CS	Apps	CS	Apps	CS
Newcastle Jets	2005–06	23	8	3	0	0	0	26	8
Newcastle Jets	Total	23	8	3	0	0	0	26	8
Brisbane Roar	2006–07	16	6	4	2	0	0	20	8
Brisbane Roar	2007–08	20	6	4	1	0	0	24	7
Brisbane Roar	2008–09	20	4	2	0	0	0	22	4
Brisbane Roar	2009–10	10	3	–	–	0	0	10	3
Brisbane Roar	Total	66	19	10	3	0	0	76	22
Wellington Phoenix	2009–10	12	5	–	–	0	0	12	5
Wellington Phoenix	Total	12	5	–	–	0	0	12	5
Sydney FC	2010–11	18	2	–	–	6	1	24	3
Sydney FC	2011–12	19	4	–	–	0	0	19	4
Sydney FC	Total	37	6	–	–	6	1	43	7
Central Coast Mariners	2013–14	25	8	–	–	6	1	31	8
Central Coast Mariners	2014–15	25	7	4	2	1	0	30	9
Central Coast Mariners	2015–16	2	0	0	0	–	–	2	0
Central Coast Mariners	Total	52	15	4	2	7	1	63	18
Western Sydney Wanderers	2015–16	6	2	0	0	–	–	6	2
Western Sydney Wanderers	Total	6	2	0	0	0	0	6	2
Career Total		196	55	17	5	13	2	226	62

^{1} – AFC Champions League statistics are included in season ending during group stages (i.e. ACL 2011 and A-League season 2010–11 etc.)

== Coaching career ==
Reddy retired from professional football in 2023 and has been the Young Socceroos. goalkeeper coach since 2024, Winning the Asian Cup with the u20's in 2025

== Honours ==
- NPL-NSW Premiership 2013

Perth Glory

- A-League Premiership: 2018–19
- NPL-WA Premiership 2022–23
