= Ivan Necevski =

Australian soccer player

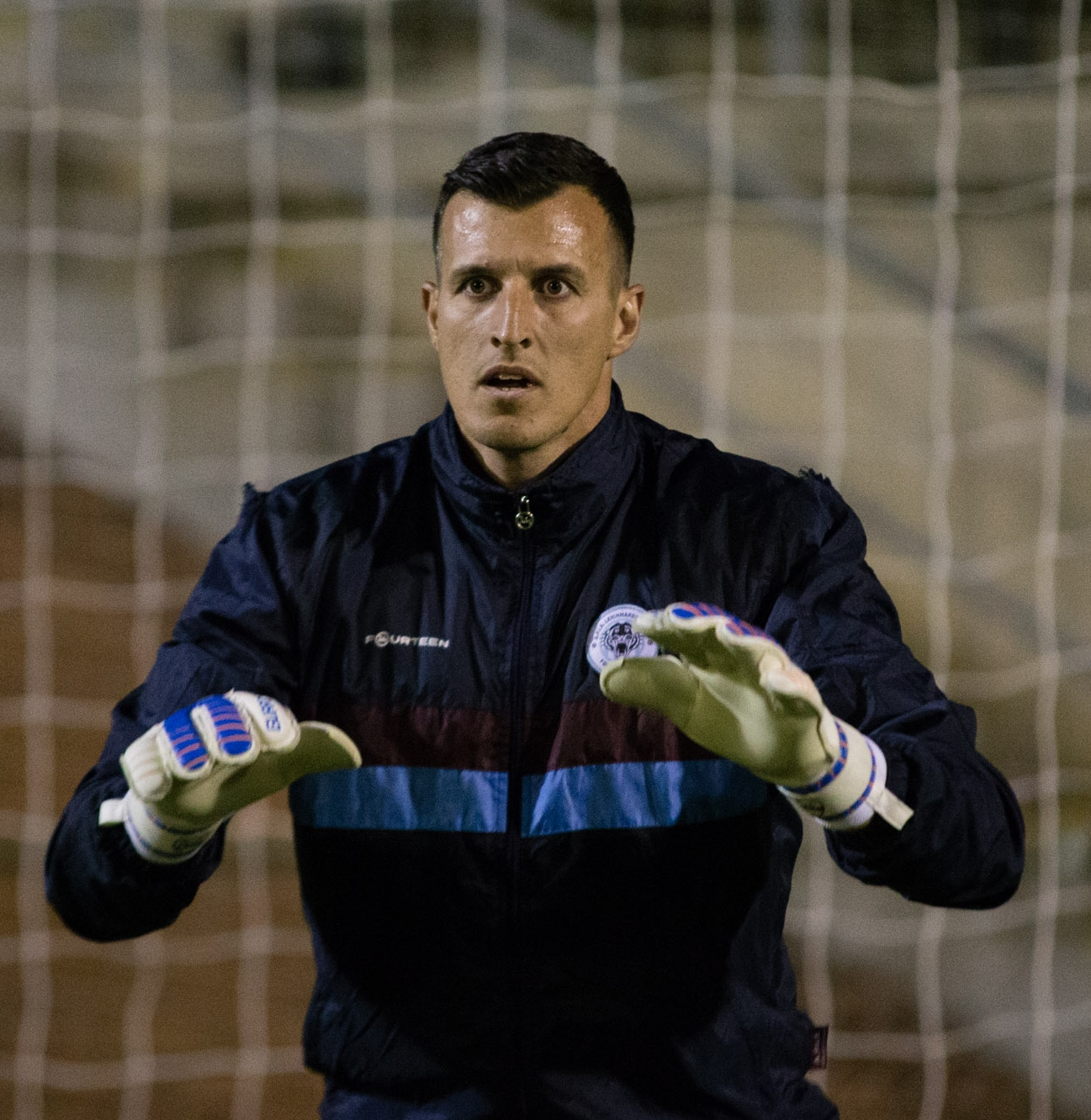
- Necevski warming up before playing with APIA Leichhardt Tigers FC in 2017

Personal information
- Date of birth: 25 February 1980 (age 46)
- Place of birth: Sydney, New South Wales, Australia
- Height: 1.90 m (6 ft 3 in)
- Position: Goalkeeper

Senior career*
| Years | Team | Apps | (Gls) |
| 2000–2001 | Penrith Panthers | 21 | (0) |
| 2001 | Illawarra Lions | 5 | (0) |
| 2001–2002 | Bonnyrigg White Eagles | 14 | (0) |
| 2002 | Rockdale City | 4 | (0) |
| 2002–2003 | West Sydney Berries | 22 | (0) |
| 2003–2004 | Sydney United | 0 | (0) |
| 2004–2005 | Penrith Panthers | 24 | (0) |
| 2005–2006 | New Zealand Knights | 0 | (0) |
| 2006 | Blacktown City | 6 | (0) |
| 2006–2007 | Newcastle Jets | 3 | (0) |
| 2007 | Blacktown City | 19 | (0) |
| 2007–2015 | Sydney FC | 45 | (0) |
| 2015 | Rockdale City Suns | 7 | (0) |
| 2015–2016 | Sydney FC | 0 | (0) |
| 2016–2017 | Central Coast Mariners | 7 | (0) |
| 2017 | APIA Leichhardt | 12 | (0) |
| 2017–2018 | Newcastle Jets | 0 | (0) |
| 2018–2024 | APIA Leichhardt | 120 | (0) |
| Total | | 309 | (0) |
- * Club domestic league appearances and goals

Ivan Necevski (Macedonian: Иван Нечевски, Ivan Nečevski), (born 25 February 1980) is an Australian retired professional goalkeeper who last played for APIA Leichhardt.

== Club career ==
He has previously played for the Blacktown, Illawarra Lions, Canterbury-Marrickville, Bonnyrigg White Eagles, Sydney United, Rockdale City Suns, and A-League clubs New Zealand Knights and Newcastle Jets.

=== Sydney FC ===
Necevski signed for Sydney in 2007 as a reserve behind Clint Bolton, and a hamstring injury suffered in training kept him away from duties for the first three months of the season. He made his debut for Sydney on 27 November 2007 in an exhibition match against Los Angeles Galaxy, playing the second half. A hip injury to Bolton in December, gave Necevski his first A-League game with Sydney against Central Coast Mariners.

Necevski was the first choice keeper for Sydney at the Pan-Pacific Championship 2008, due to main keeper Clint Bolton resting a small injury sustained against Queensland Roar the week before. He played both of Sydney's matches, first against Houston Dynamo where Sydney went down in a crushing 3–0 loss, and against Los Angeles Galaxy where a simple cross from David Beckham led to Galaxy's second goal in a 2–1 loss. Despite not playing one game during the 2009–10 A-League season, Necevski signed a 1-year extension with the club, which will see him battle out the #1 Jersey, between himself and expected signing Liam Reddy. He kept a full game in the high-profile friendly against English Premier League team Everton FC at ANZ Stadium during the Sydney FC season 2010-11 pre-season. Sydney lost the match 1–0.

He made his first starting appearance for Sydney FC in well over a year when he was called up to the starting squad in the 2010–11 season against Perth Glory, replacing out of form, and seemingly out of favour Liam Reddy. The move proved a success, with Sydney FC running out winners 3–0 – their first win of the 2010–11 season, as well as their first clean sheet. He was rewarded soon after by manager Vitezslav Lavicka for his patience and loyalty to the club after playing second-fiddle for most of his career, with a 2-year contract.

It was announced that Necevski would play his final game for Sydney FC in the post 2014–15 season friendly against Premier League club Tottenham Hotspur. Necevski played 88 minutes before being substituted for young keeper Anthony Bouzanis in Sydney's 1–0 loss. Necevski made 45 A-League appearances for Sydney FC throughout his 8-year stint at the club, mostly used in a backup role.

=== Rockdale City Suns FC ===
Necevski signed for National Premier Leagues NSW club Rockdale City Suns for the remainder of the 2015 National Premier Leagues NSW season, and for the clubs 2015 FFA Cup campaign as an injury replacement for Tomislav Arcaba.

=== Return to Sydney FC ===
Necevski re-signed with Sydney FC on a 1-year contract following the 2015 NSW National Premier Leagues season, and Rockdale City's 2015 FFA Cup campaign. After not making a single appearance for Sydney FC the whole season, with Vedran Janjetović starting every match, Necevski was not offered a new contract.

=== Central Coast Mariners ===
In June 2016, Necevski signed with A-League club Central Coast Mariners.

=== APIA Leichhardt Tigers ===
Necevski joined APIA Leichhardt Tigers for the 2017 National Premier Leagues season in May 2017.

=== Return to Newcastle Jets ===
In October 2017, Newcastle Jets signed Necevski on a replacement contract at the age of 37 to cover the absence of substitute goalkeeper Glen Moss while he was on international duty with New Zealand.

== A-League career statistics ==
As of 23 October 2014

CS = Clean Sheets

| Club | Season | League | | Finals | | Cup | | Asia^{1} | | Total | |
| Club | Season | Apps | CS | Apps | CS | Apps | CS | Apps | CS | Apps | CS |
|---|---|---|---|---|---|---|---|---|---|---|---|
| New Zealand Knights | 2005–06 | 0 | 0 | - | - | 0 | 0 | - | - | 0 | 0 |
| New Zealand Knights | 2006–07 | 0 | 0 | - | - | 2 | 0 | - | - | 2 | 0 |
| New Zealand Knights | Total | 0 | 0 | 0 | 0 | 2 | 0 | 0 | 0 | 2 | 0 |
| Newcastle Jets | 2006–07 | 3 | 2 | 0 | 0 | 0 | 0 | - | - | 3 | 2 |
| Newcastle Jets | Total | 3 | 2 | 0 | 0 | 0 | 0 | 0 | 0 | 3 | 2 |
| Sydney FC | 2007–08 | 1 | 0 | 0 | 0 | 0 | 0 | - | - | 1 | 0 |
| Sydney FC | 2008–09 | 11 | 3 | - | - | 1 | 0 | - | - | 12 | 3 |
| Sydney FC | 2009–10 | 0 | 0 | 0 | 0 | - | - | - | - | 0 | 0 |
| Sydney FC | 2010–11 | 13 | 5 | - | - | - | - | 0 | 0 | 13 | 5 |
| Sydney FC | 2011–12 | 8 | 1 | 1 | 0 | - | - | - | - | 9 | 1 |
| Sydney FC | 2012–13 | 11 | 1 | - | - | - | - | - | - | 11 | 1 |
| Sydney FC | 2013–14 | 0 | 0 | - | - | - | - | - | - | 0 | 0 |
| Sydney FC | 2014–15 | 0 | 0 | - | - | 1 | 0 | - | - | 1 | 0 |
| Sydney FC | Total | 44 | 10 | 1 | 0 | 2 | 0 | 0 | 0 | 47 | 10 |
| Career Total | | 47 | 11 | 1 | 0 | 4 | 0 | 0 | 0 | 52 | 11 |

^{1} - AFC Champions League statistics are included in season commencing during group stages (i.e. ACL 2011 and A-League season 2010–11 etc.)

== Honours ==
=== Club ===
Sydney FC:

- A-League Premiership: 2009–10
- A-League Championship: 2009–10
