= Bruno Cazarine =

Brazilian footballer (born 1983)

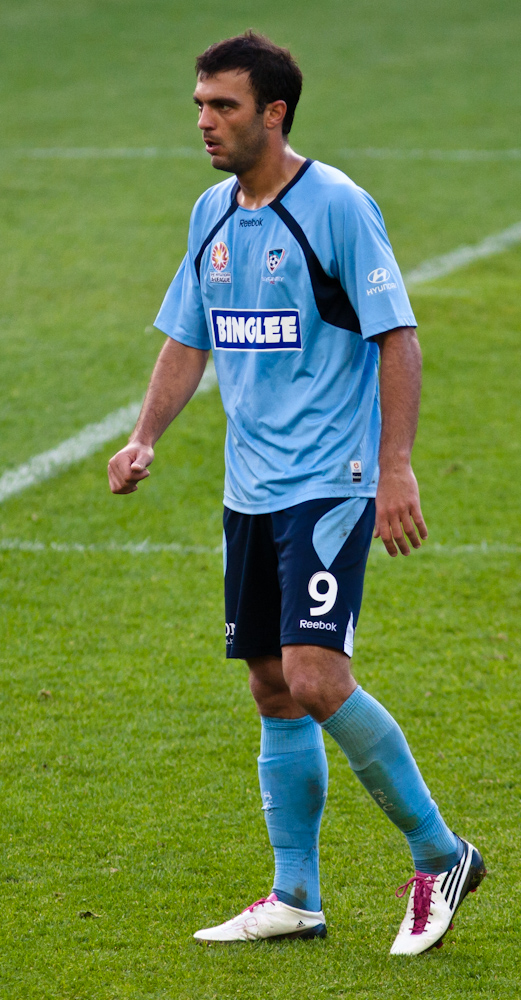

Personal information
- Full name: Bruno Cazarine Constantino
- Date of birth: 6 May 1983 (age 43)
- Place of birth: Mogi das Cruzes, Brazil
- Height: 1.88 m (6 ft 2 in)
- Position: Striker

Youth career
- 1999–2002: Palmeiras

Senior career*
Years	Team	Apps	(Gls)
2002–2003	Palmeiras	29	(3)
2003–2004	Al-Sailiya	21	(7)
2004–2005	Chengdu Blades	16	(8)
2005	→ Terrassa (loan)	19	(3)
2005–2007	Naval 1º Maio	17	(2)
2007	Martina	13	(3)
2007	Bragantino	12	(4)
2008	Bahia	25	(7)
2009	Gyeongnam	3	(0)
2009	Guarani	19	(8)
2010	Vila Nova	16	(3)
2010–2012	Sydney FC	50	(17)
- * Club domestic league appearances and goals as of 30 March 2012

Bruno Cazarine Constantino, also known as Bruno Cazarine (born 6 May 1983), is a retired Brazilian footballer who played as a striker.

== Career ==
Cazarine is a modern-day journeyman having played short stints for clubs in Brazil, Qatar, Portugal, Italy, Spain, China, South Korea and Australia.

=== Sydney FC ===
On 27 August 2010, Cazarine signed a 12-month deal with 2009–10 Australian A-League champions Sydney FC after a successful trial. He made his debut for Sydney in their Round 5, 3–1 loss to Adelaide United at the Sydney Football Stadium

Cazarine's first goal for Sydney FC was in a 2–1 away loss to Wellington Phoenix. After finishing the 2010/11 season as Sydney FC's highest goalscorer with 9 goals, Cazarine signed a 1-year extension allowing him to play in the Asian Champions League and into the 2011–12 season.

Cazarine played an important role along with Nick Carle in helping to keep Sydney FC's Champions League campaign hopes alive after scoring a brace in Sydney's 3–2 win against Shanghai Shenhua in Shanghai, followed by Sydney's only goal a week later in their 3–1 loss to Suwon Bluewings.

Cazarine made his milestone 50th and final appearance for the club in their 3–2 semi-final defeat at the hands of Wellington Phoenix. He left the club at the end of the 2011–12 season citing a mixture of uncertainty regarding his future at the club, as well as family reasons back in Brazil.

== Sydney FC statistics ==
Cazarine is Sydney FC's second most prolific striker in the club's history, with a goals-to-game ratio of 0.34 goals/game. This puts him behind Alessandro Del Piero at 0.58 goals/game and in front of previous Sydney FC stars Dwight Yorke on 0.32 and Alex Brosque in third at 0.30. This also included many appearances as a substitute in the 2011–12 season.

Statistics accurate as of 1 April 2012

Club	Season	League			Cup			Asia			Total		
Club	Season	Apps	Goals	Assists	Apps	Goals	Assists	Apps	Goals	Assists	Apps	Goals	Assists
Sydney FC	2010–11	22	9	1	0	0	0	6	3	0	28	12	1
Sydney FC	2011–12	28	8	2	0	0	0	0	0	0	28	8	2
Sydney FC total		50	17	3	0	0	0	6	3	0	56	20	3
A-League total		50	17	3	0	0	0	6	3	0	56	20	3
