= Mark Bridge =

Australian footballer (born 1985)

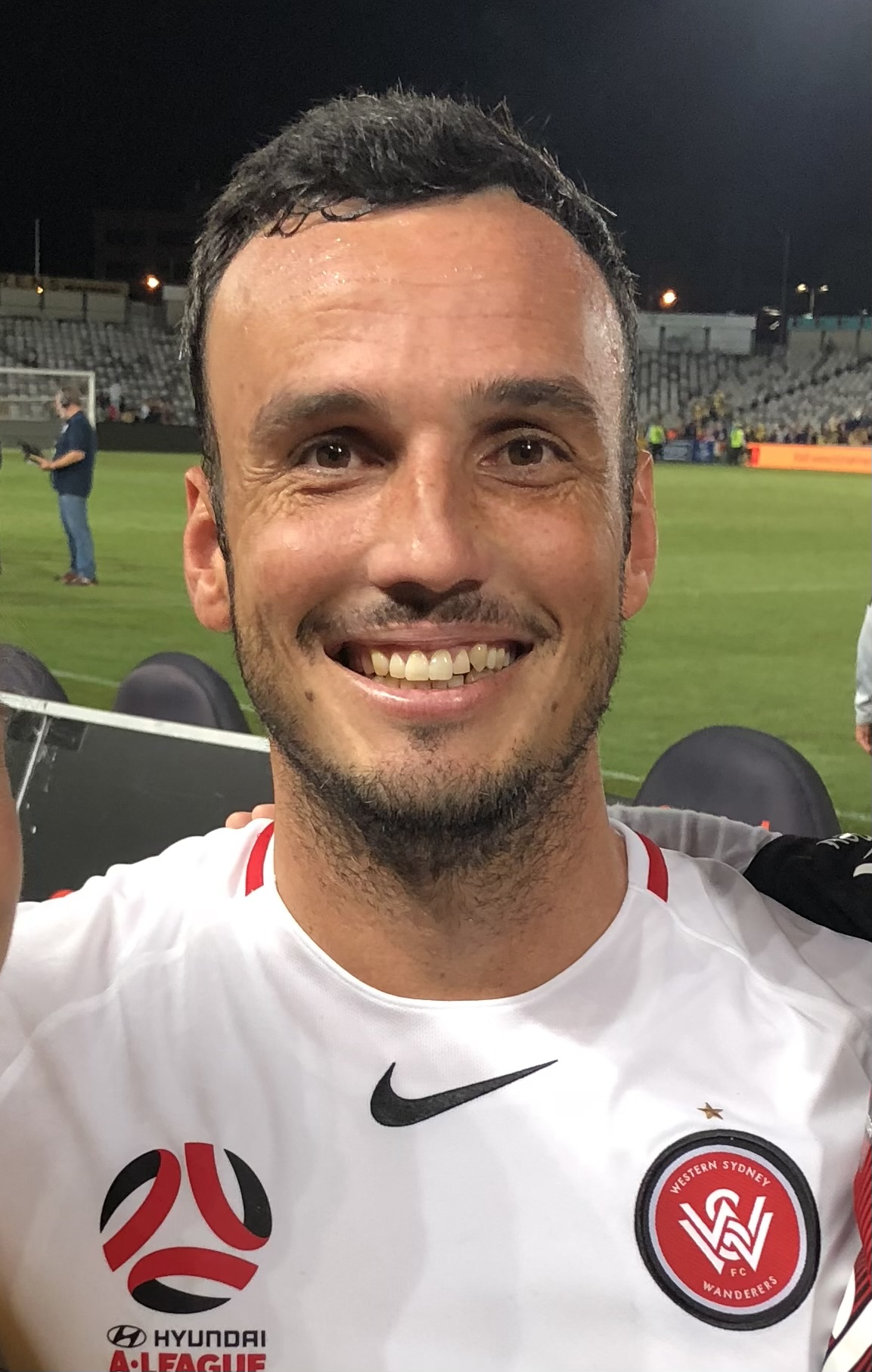
- Bridge with the Western Sydney Wanderers in 2019

Personal information
- Full name: Mark Robert Bridge
- Date of birth: 7 November 1985 (age 41)
- Place of birth: Sydney, New South Wales, Australia
- Height: 5 ft 11 in (1.80 m)
- Position: Forward

Team information
- Current team: Camden Tigers
- Number: 19

Youth career
- Parramatta Eagles

Senior career*
| Years | Team | Apps | (Gls) |
| 2003–2004 | Parramatta Power | 5 | (0) |
| 2005–2008 | Newcastle Jets | 50 | (13) |
| 2008–2012 | Sydney FC | 80 | (17) |
| 2009 | → Tianjin Teda (loan) | 2 | (0) |
| 2012–2016 | Western Sydney Wanderers | 95 | (28) |
| 2016–2017 | Chiangrai United | 14 | (7) |
| 2017–2019 | Western Sydney Wanderers | 26 | (5) |
| 2019 | Mounties Wanderers | 7 | (0) |

International career
| 2004–2005 | Australia U20 | 9 | (9) |
| 2006–2008 | Australia U23 | 23 | (3) |
| 2008 | Australia | 2 | (0) |
Medal record
Men's football
Representing Australia
OFC U-20 Championship
| Winner | 2005 |
- * Club domestic league appearances and goals as of 26 September 2019

Mark Robert Bridge (born 7 November 1985) is a retired Australian professional football (soccer) player.

Bridge is the Western Sydney Wanderers' first ever goalscorer, earning himself the nickname 'King Bridge' among fans. On 18 April 2015 in the 26th-round match against Adelaide United, Bridge became the ninth player to reach 200 A-League games.

== Club career ==
=== Newcastle Jets ===
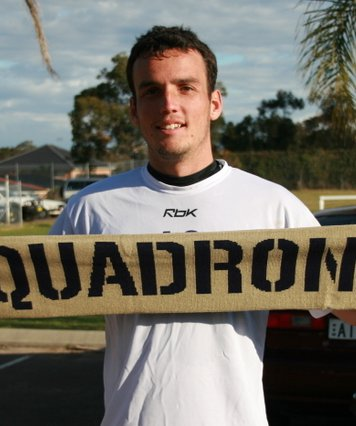
Bridge with Newcastle in 2007

Bridge joined Newcastle from Parramatta Power in 2005 during the inaugural A-League season. Although it took some time for Bridge to find his feet he was the Jets best player during his second season (2006/07) at the club scoring 8 goals during the season.

Although his third season with the Jets only yielded four goals, his last for the Jets was the most decisive, being the only goal in the 2008 A-League Grand Final.

=== Sydney FC ===
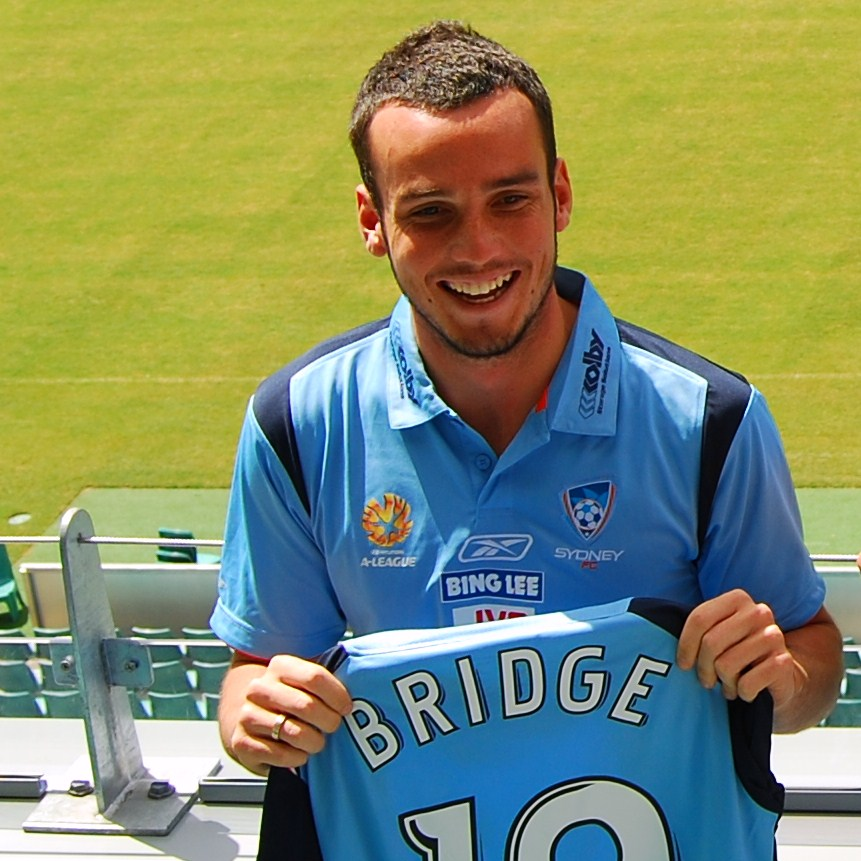
Bridge in 2008

As his contract had expired at the Jets, Bridge subsequently left the team and was unveiled as a Sydney FC player on 3 March 2008 alongside Simon Colosimo and John Aloisi. He scored his first goal for Sydney in their 5–2 demolition of Perth Glory at the Sydney Football Stadium.

On 11 February 2009, Bridge arrived Kunming, Yunnan province, China, meet with Tianjin TEDA. He signed a four-month loan deal for Chinese Super League club Tianjin Teda during the offseason with Sydney FC. However, Tianjin's failure to qualify from the group stage of the AFC Champions League meant that he had made the last appearance for the club and would return to Sydney FC at the end of May.

He became the first player to score in two A-League Grand finals with his headed goal against Melbourne Victory in the 09-10 edition, which Sydney went on to win on penalties

Bridge scored the third goal in the 3–2 victory of Chinese Super League club Shanghai Shenhua, during the 2011 AFC Champions League keeping Sydney's chances of progressing through to the next round alive.

Bridge was sent from the field after being given a red card in the opening game of the 2011–12 A-League season against Melbourne Victory, following an altercation in which Bridge struck Victory player Rodrigo Vargas in the throat. The match would finish 0–0.

Bridge asked for and received a mutual termination of his Sydney FC contract on 1 June 2012.

=== Western Sydney Wanderers ===
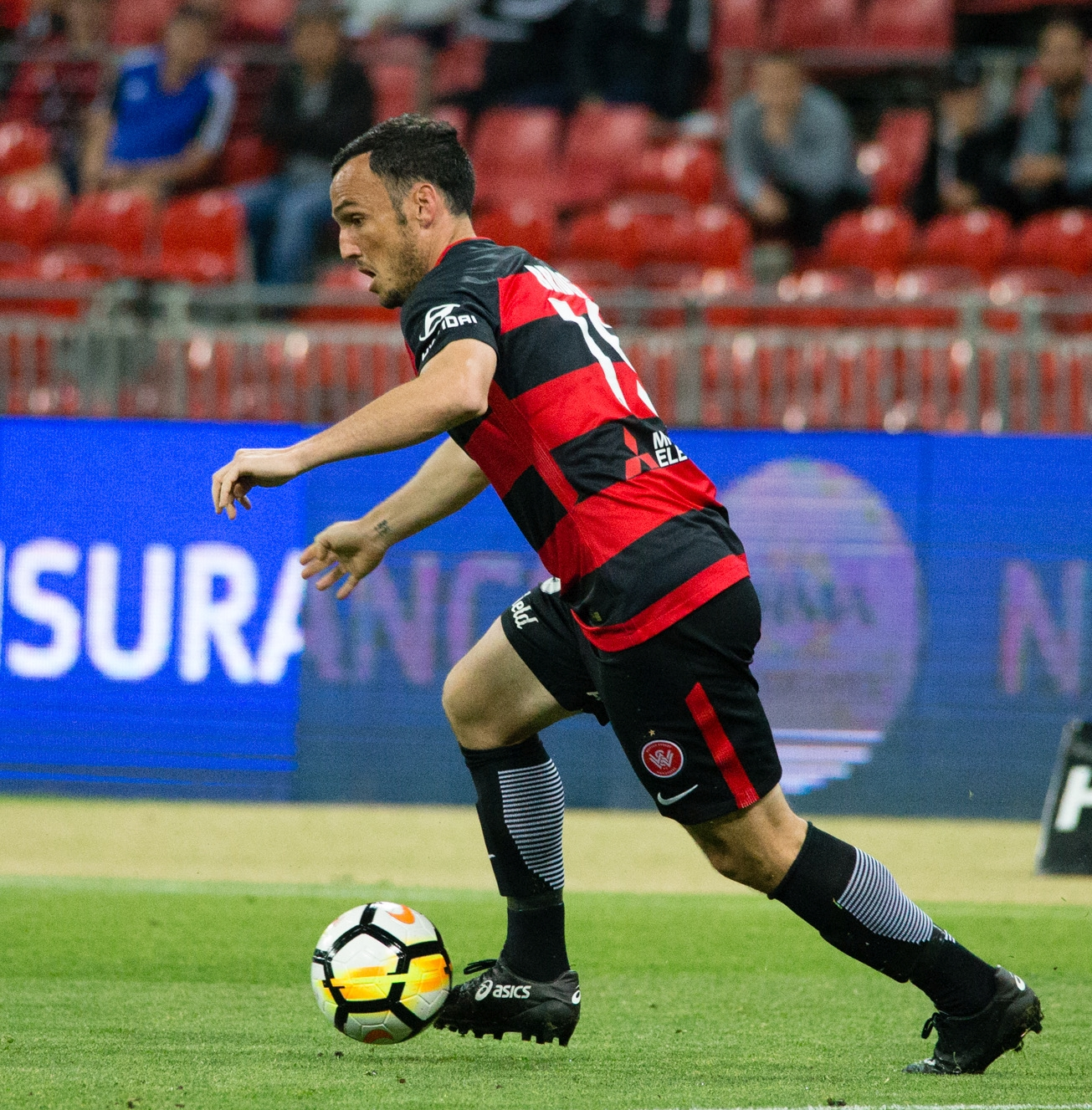
Bridge playing for the Wanderers in 2017

On 30 June 2012 it was officially announced he had joined the newly formed Western Sydney Wanderers club.

On 27 October 2012 Bridge scored the first ever A-League goal for the Western Sydney Wanderers, against Brisbane Roar in the Wanderers fourth game of their inaugural season.

Bridge scored the Wanderers' first ever hat-trick in the round 16 6–1 thrashing of Adelaide United in their inaugural season. Bridge was also the Wanderers' top goalscorer for the 2012–13 A-League season with 11 goals. Bridge is also the club's all-time top goalscorer.

On 25 October 2014 Bridge was part of the Western Sydney Wanderers squad who defeated Al Hilal to win the Asian Champions League. Western Sydney Wanderers won the match 1–0 on aggregate to become the first Australian team to win the trophy. As champions, Wanderers also earned the right to represent the AFC at the 2014 FIFA Club World Cup in Morocco, entering at the quarter-finals.

=== Chiangrai United ===
On 27 May 2016, after 4 seasons with the Western Sydney Wanderers, Bridge left the club to join Thai Premier League club Chiangrai United. On 6 July 2017, Bridge terminated his contract with Chiangrai United.

=== Return to Western Sydney Wanderers ===
In July 2017, Bridge returned to Western Sydney Wanderers on a two-year contract.

=== Mounties Wanderers FC ===
On 12 March 2019, Bridge signed for National Premier Leagues NSW 2 side Mounties Wanderers FC. Bridge is set to join the club at the conclusion of the 2018–19 A-League season.

== Life after professional career ==
=== Blacktown Premier Spurs and Camden Tigers ===
Mark Bridge, Retired from Semi-Professional NPL football in 2020, in 2021 he started playing local football in the Blacktown & District Soccer Football Association. In 2024 he signed with Camden Tigers and is currently playing in The Macarthur District Soccer Football Association.

== International career ==
Mark Bridge has played for the Australian U-20 Squad where he made 9 appearances and scored 9 goals. He is currently a member of Australia U-23 national team. He was also called up to Australia senior squad for their Asian Cup qualifiers, in a match against Kuwait on 16 August. He was hoping to be included in the Australia senior squad for the Asian Cup games against Qatar, China and Iraq, but was not selected.

Bridge made his senior international debut against Singapore in a friendly match in March 2008.

Bridge was selected for the 2008 Australian Olympic squad.

== A-League statistics ==
As of 12 December 2018

| Club | Season | League | | | National Cup | | Continental | | Other | | Total | |
| Club | Season | Division | Apps | Goals | Apps | Goals | Apps | Goals | Apps | Goals | Apps | Goals |
|---|---|---|---|---|---|---|---|---|---|---|---|---|
| Parramatta Power | 2003–04 | National Soccer League | 5 | 0 | 0 | 0 | — | | — | | 5 | 0 |
| Newcastle Jets | 2005–06 | A-League | 6 | 0 | — | | — | | — | | 6 | 0 |
| Newcastle Jets | 2006–07 | A-League | 24 | 8 | — | | — | | 6 (Note: 6 appearances in A-League Pre-Season Challenge Cup) | 1 | 30 | 9 |
| Newcastle Jets | 2007–08 | A-League | 20 | 5 | — | | — | | 4 (Note: 4 appearances in A-League Pre-Season Challenge Cup) | 0 | 24 | 5 |
| Newcastle Jets | Total | | 50 | 13 | — | | — | | 10 | 1 | 60 | 14 |
| Sydney FC | 2008–09 | A-League | 21 | 4 | — | | — | | — | | 21 | 4 |
| Sydney FC | 2009–10 | A-League | 23 | 9 | — | | — | | — | | 23 | 9 |
| Sydney FC | 2010–11 | A-League | 18 | 1 | — | | 5 | 1 | — | | 23 | 2 |
| Sydney FC | 2011–12 | A-League | 18 | 3 | — | | — | | — | | 18 | 3 |
| Sydney FC | Total | | 80 | 17 | — | | 5 | 1 | — | | 85 | 18 |
| Tianjin Teda (loan) | 2009 | Chinese Super League | 2 | 0 | — | | 4 | 0 | — | | 6 | 0 |
| Western Sydney Wanderers | 2012–13 | A-League | 27 | 11 | — | | — | | — | | 27 | 11 |
| Western Sydney Wanderers | 2013–14 | A-League | 26 | 5 | — | | 9 | 2 | — | | 35 | 7 |
| Western Sydney Wanderers | 2014–15 | A-League | 18 | 3 | 1 | 0 | 5 | 2 | 1 (Note: 1 appearance in the 2014 FIFA Club World Cup) | 0 | 24 | 5 |
| Western Sydney Wanderers | 2015–16 | A-League | 24 | 9 | 2 | 0 | — | | — | | 26 | 9 |
| Western Sydney Wanderers | 2017–18 | A-League | 21 | 4 | 3 | 1 | — | | — | | 24 | 5 |
| Western Sydney Wanderers | Total | | 116 | 32 | 6 | 1 | 14 | 4 | 1 | 0 | 136 | 37 |
| Career total | | | 248 | 62 | 6 | 1 | 23 | 5 | 11 | 1 | 288 | 69 |

== Honours ==
Newcastle Jets:

- A-League Championship: 2007–08

Sydney FC:

- A-League Premiership: 2009–10
- A-League Championship: 2009–10

Western Sydney Wanderers:

- A-League Premiership: 2012–13
- AFC Champions League: 2014

Australia U20

- OFC U-20 Championship: 2005

Individual

- Western Sydney Wanderers Player of the Year: 2012–13, 2015–16
- A-League All Star: 2013
