= Nick Carle =

Australian soccer player

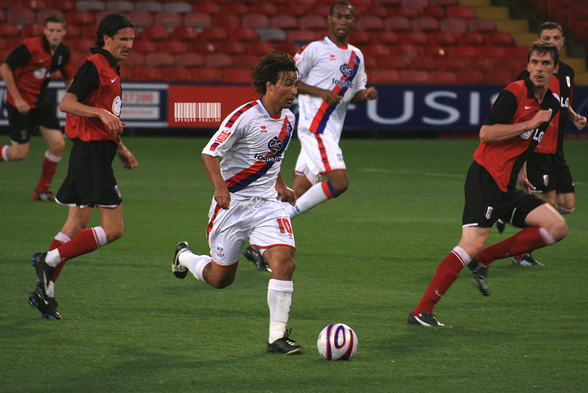
- Carle playing for Crystal Palace in 2008

Personal information
- Full name: Nicholas Alberto Carle
- Date of birth: 23 November 1981 (age 44)
- Place of birth: Sydney, New South Wales, Australia
- Height: 1.74 m (5 ft 9 in)
- Position: Attacking midfielder

Youth career
- Blacktown City
- Sydney Olympic

Senior career*
Years	Team	Apps	(Gls)
1997–2002	Sydney Olympic	95	(12)
2002–2003	Troyes	5	(0)
2003–2005	Marconi Stallions	25	(6)
2005–2007	Newcastle Jets	45	(7)
2007–2008	Gençlerbirliği	14	(1)
2008	Bristol City	17	(0)
2008–2010	Crystal Palace	59	(4)
2010–2015	Sydney FC	63	(8)
2012–2013	→ Baniyas (loan)	21	(2)
Total		344	(40)

International career
1997	Australia U-17	5	(7)
1998–2001	Australia U-20	16	(9)
1998–2004	Australia U-23	16	(2)
2004–2012	Australia	13	(0)
Medal record
Representing Australia
Men's Association football
OFC U-19 Men's Championship
Winner	1998 Samoa
Winner	2001 Cook Islands/New Caledonia
- * Club domestic league appearances and goals

Nicholas Alberto Carle (born 23 November 1981) is an Australian former professional soccer attacking midfielder who played for Sydney Olympic, Troyes, Marconi Stallions, Newcastle Jets, Gençlerbirliği, Bristol City, Crystal Palace, Baniyas and Sydney FC.

== Club career ==
Born in Sydney, Australia, Carle is of Uruguayan and Chilean descent. As a junior, Carle won five national futsal titles. During his days as a teenage schoolboy, he played football for his high school, Patrician Brothers' College, Fairfield. He helped his school win the Bill Turner Cup competition in 1996.

=== Sydney Olympic ===
Carle began his career as a 15-year-old at Sydney Olympic in the NSL, making his NSL debut on 5 October 1997. After coming on as a substitute in the 75th minute, he scored an injury time winner against Marconi Stallions. He had a brief stint at French club Troyes before returning to Australia with Marconi Stallions and Ryde City Gunners.

=== Newcastle Jets ===
When the A-League was formed in 2005 Carle joined the Newcastle Jets. He played for the Jets in the first two seasons of the A-League and was popular with the Newcastle Jets fans. Carle played as an attacking midfielder during his time at the Newcastle Jets.

In February 2007 Carle won the prestigious Johnny Warren Medal for the players' player of the year for his performance throughout the A-League 2006–07 season, beating Melbourne Victory's Daniel Allsopp, Archie Thompson and Kevin Muscat. Carle also won the goal of the year award for his 70-metre run followed by a strike from 20 metres with the outside of his left boot, which proved to be the winning goal in the Round 10 clash against Adelaide United (Adelaide had only seconds earlier missed a penalty to win the match) and was arguably the catalyst for turning around the Jet's poor season up until that point.

=== Gençlerbirliği ===
At the end of the 2006–07 season Carle expressed his concern that the A-League season was not long enough. He felt that playing more games would improve his chances of selection for the national team and said that offers from Europe would be tempting. Despite being initially linked with Fenerbahçe in the media, Carle eventually signed with Gençlerbirliği. The Süper Lig club paid a transfer fee of about $650,000 for Carle, with the Newcastle Jets also receiving a percentage of any further transfer fees should Carle be sold by the Turkish club. The Newcastle Jets received a total of $800,000 for Carle after his transfer to Bristol City.

=== Bristol City ===
In early January 2008 Carle transferred to Football League Championship side Bristol City for an undisclosed fee after impressing against Nigeria in an international friendly. He signed a contract for three and a half years, helping the Robins to the play-offs where they were beaten in the final at Wembley Stadium. Carle made the move because he was unhappy at Gençlerbirliği, especially because he was not able to see his family enough.

=== Crystal Palace ===
Carle's stay at Ashton Gate was short-lived however, moving to Crystal Palace for £1m less than six months later. Carle was unable to command a regular first team place under either Neil Warnock or Paul Hart and in May 2010, Palace released him with two years remaining on his contract.

=== Sydney FC ===
Carle signed with Sydney FC in May 2010 for a reported A$1.95 million over three years.

In his first season, Nick struggled with form and injuries in a season to forget, as Sydney slumped to third last on the table. Carle scored a goal against Adelaide United to seal a win for Sydney, their first of the season, on 22 October 2011.

==== Loan to the UAE ====
Only weeks before the start of the 2012–13 A-League season, it was announced that Sydney FC had agreed to loan Carle out for an undisclosed fee to UAE club Baniyas SC for one year. He will return to see out the remainder of his contract at Sydney FC during the 2013–14 season.

=== Return to Sydney FC ===
On 16 May 2013, it was announced that Carle would return to Sydney FC for the 2013–14 season for the final year of his original contract. Additionally, it was announced that Carle had signed a one-year extension, keeping him at the club until the close of the 2014–15 season.

"I’m really happy to be coming back to Sydney FC", Carle said. "I enjoyed my experience in Abu Dhabi with Bani Yas but Sydney is home and I want to finish my career with Sydney FC."

On 3 June 2015, Carle was released from Sydney.

In July 2016 Carle announced his retirement from professional football following his knee not healing properly after an anterior cruciate ligament injury. He accepted a job to work with the Sydney FC academy.

== International career ==
Carle began his international career playing for Australia at under-17 level before representing Australia at the under-20s 2001 FIFA World Youth Championship. He also later played for the under-23s but missed out on selection for the 2004 Olympics in Athens.

He earned his first senior cap against Venezuela in 2004 coming on as a substitute in the 84th minute replacing David Zdrilic. However it was his only appearance for the senior national team for three years. Carle regularly missed selection under Frank Farina and did not feature at all under Guus Hiddink. Carle's form for Jets in the 2006–07 A-League season saw calls for new coach Graham Arnold to bring him back into the national team. Carle ended three years in exile from the national squad by coming on as a substitute in a friendly against China in March 2007, and also made an appearance against Uruguay in June, where in the dying stages of the game he attempted a rabona cross and completely missed, to the ire of commentators and spectators.

Graham Arnold selected Carle in the Australian squad for the 2007 AFC Asian Cup. He made an appearance as a substitute during Australia's match against Japan, scoring in the penalty shoot out.

Carle made his first starting appearance for the Socceroos against Nigeria at Craven Cottage, London on 18 November 2007. He put in a strong performance along with fellow former A-League player David Carney. Under national coach Pim Verbeek, Carle's opportunities were limited and although he made the initial 30-man squad for the finals tournament in South Africa, he was subsequently omitted from the touring party.

== Career statistics ==
Appearances and goals by club, season and competition
Club	Season	League			Cup		Continental		Total	
Club	Season	DIvision	Apps	Goals	Apps	Goals	Apps	Goals	Apps	Goals
Sydney Olympic	1997–98	National Soccer League	18	3	0	0	0	0	18	3
Sydney Olympic	1998–99	National Soccer League	15	3	0	0	0	0	15	3
Sydney Olympic	1999–2000	National Soccer League	26	1	0	0	0	0	26	1
Sydney Olympic	2000–01	National Soccer League	24	2	0	0	0	0	24	2
Sydney Olympic	2001–02	National Soccer League	12	3	0	0	0	0	12	3
Sydney Olympic	Total		95	12	0	0	0	0	95	12
Troyes	2001–02	French Division 1	5	0	2	0	1	0	8	0
Troyes	2002–03	Ligue 1	0	0	2	0	0	0	2	0
Troyes	Total		5	0	4	0	1	0	10	0
Marconi Stallions	2003–04	National Soccer League	24	6	0	0	0	0	24	6
Marconi Stallions	2004–05	NSW Premier League	1	0	0	0	0	0	1	0
Marconi Stallions	Total		25	6	0	0	0	0	25	6
Newcastle Jets	2005–06	A-League	22	3	4	0	0	0	26	3
Newcastle Jets	2006–07	A-League	23	4	2	2	0	0	25	6
Newcastle Jets	Total		45	7	6	2	0	0	51	9
Gençlerbirliği	2007–08	Süper Lig	14	1	0	0	0	0	14	1
Bristol City	2007–08	Championship	20	0	0	0	0	0	20	0
Crystal Palace	2008–09	Championship	37	3	4	1	0	0	41	4
Crystal Palace	2009–10	Championship	22	1	3	0	0	0	25	1
Crystal Palace	Total		59	4	7	1	0	0	66	5
Sydney FC	2010–11	A-League	17	4	0	0	4	1	21	5
Sydney FC	2011–12	A-League	25	4	0	0	0	0	24	4
Sydney FC	2013–14	A-League	17	1	0	0	0	0	17	1
Sydney FC	Total		59	9	0	0	4	1	63	10
Baniyas SC (Loan)	2012–13	UAE Pro-League	21	2	2	1	3	0	26	3
Career total			334	41	19	4	8	1	361	46

== Honours ==
Australia U20

- OFC U-19 Men's Championship: 1998, 2001

Individual

- Johnny Warren Medal: 2006–07
- A-League Goal of the Year: 2006–07
