= North Sutherland Rockets FC =

Australian association football club

The North Sutherland Rockets Football Club is an association football club from the North Sutherland area of the Sutherland Shire established in 1963. It is affiliated to the Sutherland Shire Football Assication.
