= Peter Green (referee) =

Australian soccer referee

- Full name: Peter Daniel Green
- Born: 29 May 1978 (age 48); Brisbane, Australia

Domestic
Years	League	Role
2000–2004	National Soccer League	Referee
2005–2019	A-League	Referee

International
Years	League	Role
2006–2019	FIFA	Referee

Peter Daniel Green (born 29 May 1978) is a retired Australian soccer referee in the Australian A-League. Green has been FIFA listed since 2006 and a member of the AFC Elite Referees Panel since 2008. He has refereed in three A-League Grand Final matches. He was the A-League referee of the year in 2013 and 2014.

== Career ==
Green took up refereeing as a teenager, progressing to National Soccer League level in 2000.

He has refereeing in the top tier of Australian soccer since 2002. Green was awarded a FIFA badge in 2006 and is eligible to referee international matches. He was also selected on the AFC Elite Referees Panel for the 2008 year and has refereed matches for AFC since.

During the 2012–13 A-League season, Green controlled 13 matches, including the 2012-13 A-League Grand Final.

Green refereed the 2013-14 Grand final as a reward for his consistently high performances. He is currently the longest serving A-League central referee.

On 4 April 2017, Peter Green was appointed as one of the inaugural Video assistant referee (VAR's) in the Hyundai A-League, the first top-tier football league in the world to implement the technology.

On 5 December 2018, Green was appointed to be a referee at the 2019 AFC Asian Cup in the United Arab Emirates.

Green retired as a referee on 7 May 2019.

=== A-League Matches ===
- 2013/2014 Season: A-League Referee Of The Year
- 2013/2014 Season: Grand Final Centre Referee
- 2005/2006 Season: 3 Matches (Including: 1 Pre-season)
- 2006/2007 Season: 10 Matches (Including: 2 Pre-season; Minor Semi-Final 1st Leg)
- 2007/2008 Season: 18 Matches (Including: 1 Pre-season; Preliminary Final)
- 2008/2009 Season: 9 Matches (Including: Minor Semi-Final 2nd Leg)
- 2009/2010 Season: 18 Matches (Including: Major Semi-Final 1st Leg; Preliminary Final)

=== International Matches ===
AFC Cup 2008

- 18-3-2008: Home United - Kedah FA (group stage)
- 2-4-2008: Perak FA - Kitchee (group stage)
- 14-5-2008: Dempo SC - Sur Club (group stage)

AFC Under 16 Championship 2008

- 6-10-2008: Indonesia - Korea Republic
- 8-10-2008: Uzbekistan - Bahrain
- 12-10-2008: Japan - Saudi Arabia (quarter-final)

AFC Champions League 2009

- 22-4-2009: Pakhtakor - Saba Battery (group stage)

Asian Cup 2011 qualifiers

- 28-1-2009: Singapore - Jordan
- 18-11-2009: Hong Kong - Japan

AFC Champions League 2010

- 31-3-2010: Al Gharafa - Esteghlal (group stage)
- 28-4-2010: Zob Ahan - Al Ittihad (SA) (group stage)

2010 Sydney Festival of Football

- 25-7-2010: Rangers - Blackburn Rovers
- 28-7-2010: AEK Athens - Blackburn Rovers

2010 AFC Cup

- 14-9-2010: Thai Port - Al Qadsia

2010 AFF Suzuki Cup

- 29-12-2010: Indonesia - Malaysia

2011 AFC Cup

- 24-5-2011: Muangthong United - Al Ahed
