= Hirofumi Moriyasu =

Japanese footballer (born 1985)

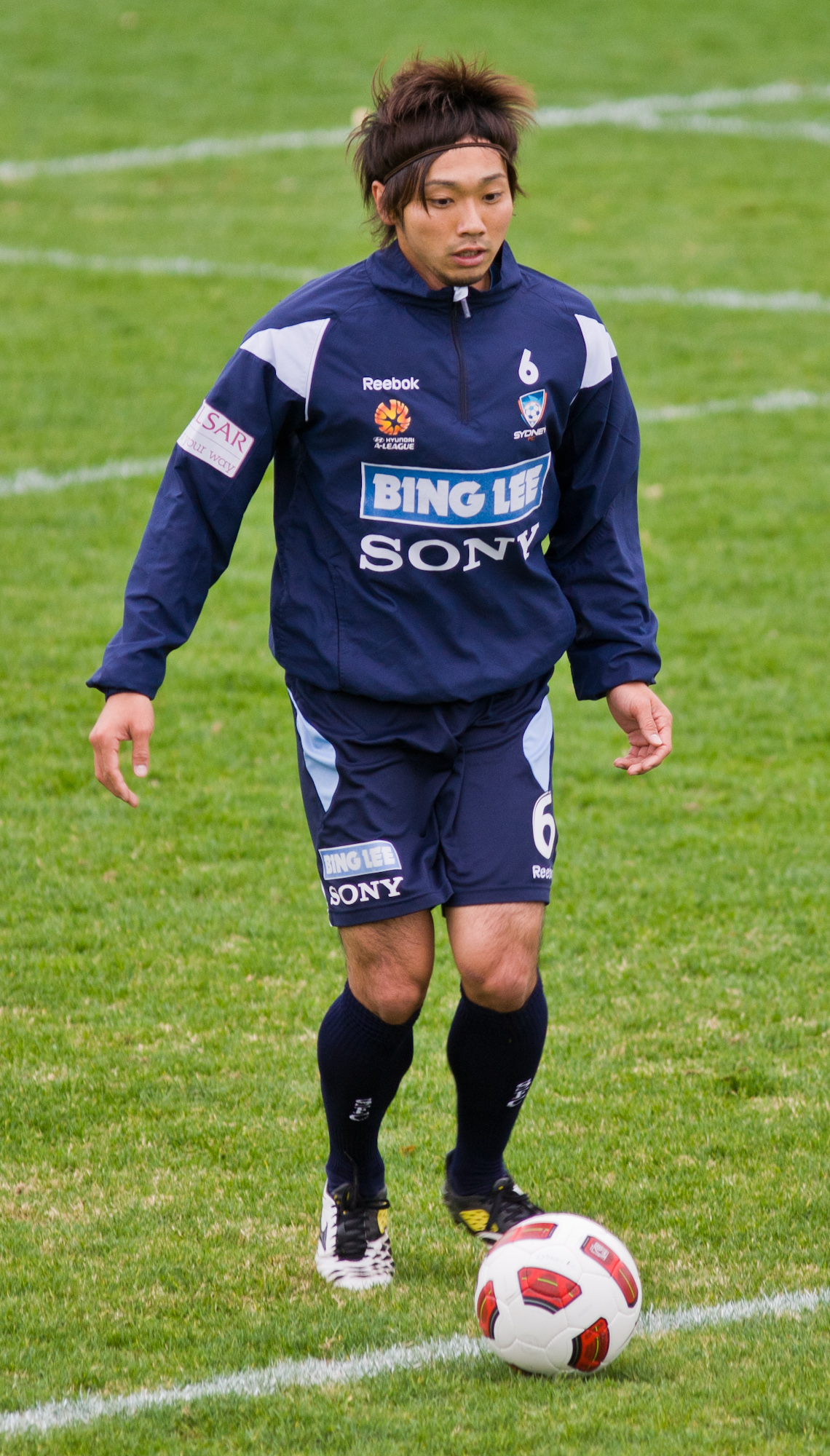
- Moriyasu training with Sydney FC in 2010

Personal information
- Date of birth: April 23, 1985 (age 41)
- Place of birth: Little Tokyo, Los Angeles, California, United States
- Height: 1.76 m (5 ft 9 in)
- Position: Defender

Youth career
- 2000: Dallas Texans
- 2001–2003: Shimizu S-Pulse

Senior career*
Years	Team	Apps	(Gls)
2004–2008	Japan Soccer College	39	(10)
2009	Mitsubishi Mizushima	30	(0)
2010	APIA Leichhardt	18	(5)
2011–2012	Sydney FC	36	(2)
2012	APIA Leichhardt	4	(1)
2012–2014	FC Gifu	35	(1)
Total		162	(19)
- * Club domestic league appearances and goals

Hirofumi Moriyasu (森安 洋文, Moriyasu Hirofumi; born April 23, 1985) is a former Japanese footballer who played as a defender.

== Career ==
Moriyasu was born in the United States, and first played for Dallas Texans before moving to Japan where he played football for his high school team, as well as college football.

He was on the verge of quitting football to search for a more conventional career when he received the opportunity to play in Australia in March 2010. He subsequently signed for New South Wales Premier League club APIA Leichhardt Tigers for the 2010 NSW Premier League season.

=== Sydney FC ===
Moriyasu signed for A-League club Sydney FC after impressing officials in several trials, including a friendly against Everton F.C. Moriyasu made his A-League debut off the bench for the Sky Blues, in their Round 3, 1–0 loss to Brisbane Roar

After several pleasing performances for Sydney FC, Moriyasu was offered a two-year extension to his contract, which he accepted gratefully.

He finally scored his first goal in Sydney FC's colours in a match against Newcastle Jets at Energy Australia Stadium, in which Sydney FC won 2–1 to break their five-game losing streak.

On 20 April 2012, it was announced that he had signed to play at APIA Leichhardt as a guest player during the A-League off season.

=== FC Gifu ===
Moriyasu signed for J2 League side FC Gifu on 14 September 2012 on a free transfer from Sydney FC.

== Career statistics ==
Club performance			League		Cup		Int'l Cup / League Cup		Total	
Season	Club	League	Apps	Goals	Apps	Goals	Apps	Goals	Apps	Goals
Japan			League		Emperor's Cup		League Cup		Total	
2004	Japan Soccer College	Regional Leagues					-			
2005	Japan Soccer College	Regional Leagues					-			
2006	Japan Soccer College	Regional Leagues	13	2	1	0	-		14	2
2007	Japan Soccer College	Regional Leagues	13	4	2	0	-		15	4
2008	Japan Soccer College	Regional Leagues	13	4	0	0	-		13	4
2009	Mitsubishi Mizushima	Football League	30	0	1	0	-		31	0
Australia			League		Cup		AFC Champions League		Total	
2010	APIA Leichhardt	NSW League	18	5	-		-		18	5
2010–11	Sydney FC	A-League	28	1	-		6	0	28	1
2011–12	Sydney FC	A-League	8	1	-		0	0	8	1
2012	APIA Leichhardt	NSW League	4	1	-		-		4	1
Japan			League		Emperor's Cup		League Cup		Total	
2012	FC Gifu	J2 League	3	0	0	0	-		3	0
2013	FC Gifu	J2 League	29	1	1	0	-		30	1
2014	FC Gifu	J2 League	3	0	0	0	-		3	0
			League		Cup		Int'l / League Cup		Total	
Total	Japan		104	11	5	0	-		109	11
Total	Australia		58	8	-		6	0	64	8
Career total			162	19	5	0	6	0	173	19
