= 2011–12 Melbourne Heart FC season =

Melbourne Heart
2011–12 season
- Chairman: Peter Sidwell
- Manager: John van 't Schip
- Stadium: AAMI Park
- A-League: 6th
- Finals Series: Elimination-finals
- Top goalscorer: Eli Babalj (9)
- Highest home attendance: 26,579 vs. Melbourne Victory (23 December 2011); A-League
- Lowest home attendance: 2,951 vs. Wellington Phoenix (4 December 2011); A-League
- Average home league attendance: 9,553
- Biggest win: 4–0 vs. Sydney FC (A) (29 December 2011); A-League
- Biggest defeat: 0–3 vs. Newcastle Jets (A) (11 February 2012); A-League; 0–3 vs. Perth Glory (A) (1 April 2012); Finals Series
Home colours	Away colours	Third colours

The 2011–12 Melbourne Heart FC season was the club's second since its establishment in 2009. The club participated in the 2011–12 A-League season, finishing in 6th position, and qualifying for their first A-League finals series, where they were eliminated by Perth Glory in the elimination-finals.

== Kits ==
From 1 April 2011, all A-League clubs were able to negotiate new kit supplier deals as the previous contract with Reebok had elapsed and as such, Melbourne Heart negotiated a one-year deal with ISC.

In conjunction with new apparel partner ISC, the club offered supporters the chance to submit designs for a ‘Third Jersey’. A design created by Red and White Unite co-founder Steven Forbes was judged the winner. The design was manufactured in a limited run of 150 and sold to the public.

== Season summary ==
On 7 July 2011, the club announced it would take part in the inaugural Hawaiian Islands Invitational from 23–25 February 2012. The squad is set to be made up of emerging youth players as the tournament overlaps with the 2011–12 A-League season. Taking part in the Invitational will be Japan's Yokohama FC, South Korea's Incheon United FC and reigning MLS Cup winners the Colorado Rapids.

The club was originally scheduled to compete in the first ever edition of the Mirabella Cup, along with fellow A-League side and fierce rival Melbourne Victory, but FFA forbade all A-League clubs from competing. The season saw the addition of a youth team to the club, which competed in the 2011–12 A-League National Youth League season.

Melbourne Heart, along with major sponsor Westpac will again stage the Westpac Community Football Festival. This will be three, three-day celebrations of football as well as a thank you to all of the club's regional supporters. The three regional centers will be set up in Albury-Wodonga on 4–6 August, in Morwell from 18–20 August and in Shepparton from 25–27 August with a practice match being played at each venue.

== Players ==
=== First-team squad ===
Note: Flags indicate national team as defined under FIFA eligibility rules; some limited exceptions apply. Players may hold more than one non-FIFA nationality.

No.	Pos.	Nation	Player
1	GK	AUS	Clint Bolton
2	DF	AUS	Michael Marrone
3	DF	AUS	Brendan Hamill
4	DF	AUS	Simon Colosimo
5	MF	BRA	Fred
6	DF	AUS	Matt Thompson
7	MF	NED	Rutger Worm
8	MF	AUS	Kristian Sarkies
9	FW	BRA	Maycon
10	MF	AUS	Wayne Srhoj
11	FW	BRA	Alex Terra
13	DF	ARG	Jonatan Germano
14	MF	AUS	Kamal Ibrahim

No.	Pos.	Nation	Player
15	FW	AUS	David Williams
16	DF	AUS	Aziz Behich
17	FW	AUS	Jason Hoffman
18	DF	AUS	Curtis Good
19	FW	AUS	Eli Babalj
20	MF	AUS	Adrian Zahra
21	MF	AUS	Kliment Taseski
22	MF	AUS	Nick Kalmar
23	MF	AUS	Mate Dugandžić
24	GK	AUS	Nikola Roganović
27	MF	AUS	Craig Goodwin
30	GK	AUS	Sebastian Mattei

=== Youth team squad ===
Note: Flags indicate national team as defined under FIFA eligibility rules; some limited exceptions apply. Players may hold more than one non-FIFA nationality.

No.	Pos.	Nation	Player
1	GK	AUS	Chris Maynard
3	MF	AUS	Kristian Konstantinidis
5	MF	AUS	Craig Goodwin
7	FW	AUS	Zac Walker
8	FW	AUS	Brodie Patterson
9	MF	AUS	Stipo Andrijasevic
10	FW	AUS	Dusan Bosnjak
11	MF	AUS	Josh Groenewald
12	MF	AUS	Jeremy Walker

No.	Pos.	Nation	Player
14	MF	AUS	Billy Liolios
15	DF	AUS	Philip Petreski
20	GK	AUS	Thomas Dunn
30	GK	AUS	Sebastian Mattei
––	DF	AUS	Charlie King
––	DF	AUS	Daniel Peluso
––	DF	AUS	Bradley Treloar
––	MF	AUS	Alon Blumgart

== Transfers ==
=== Transfers in ===
Name	Position	Moving from	Notes
(Australia) Mate Dugandžić	Midfielder	(Australia) Melbourne Victory	3 year contract
(Australia) Curtis Good	Defender	(Australia) AIS	2 year contract
(Brazil) Fred	Midfielder	(United States) D.C. United	2 year contract
(Australia) David Williams	Forward	Free Agent	Signed 3-year deal
(Brazil) Maycon	Forward	(Brazil) Nova Iguacu FC	1 year contract
(Argentina) Jonatan Germano	Midfielder	(Argentina) Estudiantes	2 year contract
(Australia) Nikola Roganovic	Goalkeeper	(Australia) Green Gully Cavaliers	1 year contract
(Australia) Adrian Madaschi	Defender	Free Agent	Injury replacement contract
(Australia) Paul Reid	Midfielder	Free Agent	Injury replacement contract

=== Transfers out ===
Name	Position	Moving to	Notes
(Australia) John Aloisi	Striker	Retired	Retired
(Australia) Josip Skoko	Midfielder	Retired	Retired
(Australia) Ante Tomić	Midfielder	(Australia) Sydney United	Released
(Australia) Peter Zois	Goalkeeper	(Australia) Oakleigh	Returned as Goalkeeping coach
(Netherlands) Gerald Sibon	Striker	(Netherlands) SC Heerenveen	Signed as free agent
(Australia) Dean Heffernan	Defender	(Australia) Perth Glory	Released from contract
(Australia) M. Beauchamp	Defender	(Australia) Sydney FC	Released from contract
(Australia) Adrian Madaschi	Defender	(South Korea) Jeju United	Injury replacement contract expired
(Australia) Paul Reid	Midfielder	Free Agent	Injury replacement contract expired

== Pre-season and friendlies ==
13 February 2011	Melbourne Heart	6–2	Northcote City	Melbourne
11:00 AEST	Hoffman 11', 35', 66'; Ibrahim 42'; Tomic 74'; Trialist 78'			Stadium: La Trobe University

6 March 2011	Pascoe Vale	2–2	Melbourne Heart	Melbourne
17:00 AEST	Luca Santilli 48', 86'	Report	Thompson 59' (pen.); Trialist 76'	Stadium: Hosken Reserve; Attendance: 200

13 April 2011	Ballarat Red Devils	0–0	Melbourne Heart	Ballarat
20:15 AEST				Stadium: Eureka Stadium

20 April 2011	Green Gully	1–0	Melbourne Heart	Melbourne
19:00 AEST				Stadium: Green Gully Reserve

4 May 2011	Geelong XI	1–6	Melbourne Heart	Geelong
19:00 AEST	Player 16'		Hoffman 26' (pen.) 45+1', 58'; Alon Blumgart 35'; Trialist 60'; Thompson 82'	Stadium: Elcho Park

11 May 2011	Port Melbourne	2–2	Melbourne Heart	Melbourne
19:00 AEST			Jean-Charles Dubois 37', 61'	Stadium: JL Murphy Reserve

23 July 2011	La Trobe University	1–11	Melbourne Heart	Melbourne
12:00 AEST			Terra 6' (pen.), 16' (pen.); Hoffman 10', 22', 69', 76'; Ibrahim 14'; Worm 37'; Babalj 48', 73'; Dugandzic 55'	Stadium: La Trobe University; Attendance: 100

30 July 2011	VCL All-Stars	0–6	Melbourne Heart	Melbourne
19:00 AEST		Report	Dugandzic 2'; Hoffman 7', 15', 78'; Srhoj 57'; Ibrahim 79'	Stadium: Veneto Social Club; Attendance: 250

5 August 2011	Albury-Wodonga XI	0–3	Melbourne Heart	Wodonga
19:30 AEST		Report	Terra 22'; Kalmar 26'; Behich 45+1'	Stadium: La Trobe University

13 August 2011	Melbourne Knights	1–2	Melbourne Heart	Melbourne
15:00 AEST	A. Colosimo 35'	Report	Terra 12'; Hoffman 52'	Stadium: Knights Stadium; Attendance: 950

19 August 2011	Melbourne Heart	0–1	Newcastle Jets	Morwell
19:30 AEST		Report	Jesic 9'	Stadium: Latrobe City Sports Stadium

26 August 2011	Melbourne Heart	2–2	Wellington Phoenix	Shepparton
19:30 AEST	Hoffman 27'; Williams 55'	Report	Sánchez 64'; Bertos 78'	Stadium: Deakin Reserve

9 September 2011	Springvale White Eagles	0–7	Melbourne Heart	Melbourne
19:30 AEST			Hoffman 7', 14'; Maycon 22'; Dugandzic 34'; Williams 36', 42'; Worm 82'	Stadium: Serbian Sports Centre

16 September 2011	Melbourne Heart	2–1	Northcote City	Melbourne
15:00	Williams 5'; Terra 88' (pen.)	Report	Covarrubias 24'	Stadium: AAMI Park

24 September 2011	Peninsula Select	0–1	Melbourne Heart	Melbourne
15:00 AEST			Fred	Stadium: Lawton Park

== Competitions ==
=== Overall record ===
Competition	First match	Last match	Starting round	Final position	Record							
Competition	First match	Last match	Starting round	Final position	Pld	W	D	L	GF	GA	GD	Win %
A-League	8 October 2011	23 March 2012	Matchday 1	6th	27	9	10	8	35	34	+1	33.33
A-League Finals Series	1 April 2012		Elimination-final	Elimination-finals	1	0	0	1	0	3	−3	0.00
Hawaiian Islands Invitational	23 February 2012	25 February 2012	Semi-final	4th	2	0	1	1	0	1	−1	0.00
Total					30	9	11	10	35	38	−3	30.00

Source: Soccerway

=== A-League ===
==== League table ====
Pos	Team	Pld	W	D	L	GF	GA	GD	Pts	Qualification
1	Central Coast Mariners	27	15	6	6	40	24	+16	51	Qualification for 2013 AFC Champions League group stage and finals series (Note: First place qualifies for the 2013 AFC Champions League group stage. Winning the 2012 A-League Grand Final automatically earns qualification for the 2013 AFC Champions League qualifying play-off, unless first place are champions.)
2	Brisbane Roar (C)	27	14	7	6	50	28	+22	49	Qualification for 2013 AFC Champions League qualifying play-off and finals series
3	Perth Glory	27	13	4	10	40	35	+5	43	Qualification for Finals series
4	Wellington Phoenix	27	12	4	11	34	32	+2	40	Qualification for Finals series
5	Sydney FC	27	10	8	9	37	42	−5	38	Qualification for Finals series
6	Melbourne Heart	27	9	10	8	35	34	+1	37	Qualification for Finals series
7	Newcastle Jets	27	10	5	12	38	41	−3	35	
8	Melbourne Victory	27	6	11	10	35	43	−8	29	
9	Adelaide United	27	5	10	12	26	44	−18	25	
10	Gold Coast United	27	4	9	14	30	42	−12	21	

Source: ultimatealeague.com
Rules for classification: 1) points; 2) goal difference; 3) number of goals scored.
(C) Champions

==== Results summary ====
Overall								Home						Away					
Pld	W	D	L	GF	GA	GD	Pts	W	D	L	GF	GA	GD	W	D	L	GF	GA	GD
28	9	10	9	35	37	−2	37	5	5	4	17	15	+2	4	5	5	18	22	−4

Source: Competitive Matches

==== Results by matchday ====
Round	1	2	3	4	5	6	7	8	9	10	11	12	13	14	15	16	17	18	19	20	21	22	23	24	25	26	27
Ground	A	H	A	H	A	H	A	A	N	A	A	H	A	H	A	H	H	H	A	H	A	H	H	A	H	H	A
Result	L	L	D	D	D	W	W	L	W	W	W	W	W	L	D	L	L	D	L	D	L	W	W	D	D	D	D
Position	8	10	9	10	10	8	6	7	6	3	3	2	2	3	3	3	3	4	5	5	6	5	5	5	5	5	6

Source: Competitive Matches
A = Away; H = Home; N = Neutral; W = Win; D = Draw; L = Loss

==== Matches ====
8 October 2011 1	Newcastle Jets	3–2	Melbourne Heart	Newcastle
Saturday, 16:30 AEST	Griffiths 31', 45+1'; Byun 90+1'	Report	Dugandzic 24', 51'	Stadium: Ausgrid Stadium; Attendance: 12,467; Referee: Ryan Shepheard

16 October 2011 2	Melbourne Heart	1–2	Perth Glory	Melbourne
Sunday, 17:00 AEDT	Williams 45' (pen.)	Report	Smeltz 33', 66'	Stadium: AAMI Park; Attendance: 7,229; Referee: Gerard Parsons

22 October 2011 3	Melbourne Victory	0–0	Melbourne Heart	Melbourne
Saturday, 19:45 AEDT		Report		Stadium: Etihad Stadium; Attendance: 39,309; Referee: Strebre Delovski

29 October 2011 4	Melbourne Heart	1–1	Sydney FC	Melbourne
Saturday, 19:30 AEDT	Maycon 88'	Report	Carle 90+4'	Stadium: AAMI Park; Attendance: 5,666; Referee: Chris Beath

4 November 2011 5	Adelaide United	1–1	Melbourne Heart	Adelaide
Friday, 20:00 AEDT	Dilevski 78'	Report	Hamill	Stadium: Hindmarsh Stadium; Attendance: 10,294; Referee: Jarred Gillett

12 November 2011 6	Melbourne Heart	3–0	Newcastle Jets	Melbourne
17:30 AEDT	Fred 66'; Dugandzic 73'; Behich 85'	Report		Stadium: AAMI Park; Attendance: 5,914; Referee: Kurt Ams

18 November 2011 7	Gold Coast United	1–2	Melbourne Heart	Gold Coast
Friday, 20:00 AEDT	Jungschlager 63'	Report	Matt Thompson 4'; Germano 68'	Stadium: Skilled Park; Attendance: 4,031; Referee: Peter O'Leary

26 November 2011 8	Central Coast Mariners	3–1	Melbourne Heart	Gosford
Saturday, 17:30 AEDT	Simon 45'; McBreen 81'; Zwaanswijk 87'	Report	Babalj 78'	Stadium: Bluetongue Stadium; Attendance: 7,242; Referee: Gerard Parsons

4 December 2011 9	Melbourne Heart	1–0	Wellington Phoenix	Morwell
Sunday, 15:00 AEDT	Dugandzic 41'	Report		Stadium: Mobil Park; Attendance: 2,951; Referee: Ben Williams

9 December 2011 10	Brisbane Roar	1–2	Melbourne Heart	Brisbane
Friday, 20:00 AEDT	Nichols 77'	Report	Germano 12'; Babalj 27'	Stadium: Suncorp Stadium; Attendance: 10,666; Referee: Kris Griffiths-Jones

17 December 2011 11	Perth Glory	1–2	Melbourne Heart	Perth
Saturday, 22:00 AEDT	Mehmet 35'	Report	Matt Thompson 33'; Dugandzic 87'	Stadium: NIB Stadium; Attendance: 6,458; Referee: Jarred Gillett

23 December 2011 12	Melbourne Heart	3–2	Melbourne Victory	Melbourne
Friday, 20:00 AEDT	Thompson 37', 39'; Terra 62'	Report	Thompson 21'; Hernández 90+2'	Stadium: AAMI Park; Attendance: 26,579; Referee: Strebre Delovski

29 December 2011 13	Sydney FC	0–4	Melbourne Heart	Sydney
Thursday, 19:30 AEDT		report	Babalj 32'; Dugandzic 45+1'; Hoffman 76'; Terra 84'	Stadium: Sydney Football Stadium; Attendance: 16,007; Referee: Peter Green

4 January 2012 14	Melbourne Heart	1–3	Adelaide United	Melbourne
Wednesday, 15:30 AEDT	Babalj 90'	Report	van Dijk 37' (pen.), 78'; Vidošić 47'	Stadium: AAMI Park; Attendance: 8,272; Referee: Kris Griffiths-Jones

8 January 2012 15	Gold Coast United	1–1	Melbourne Heart	Gold Coast
Sunday, 17:30 AEST	Rigters 72'	Report	Sarkies 8'	Stadium: Skilled Park; Attendance: 2,081; Referee: Jarred Gillett

15 January 2012 16	Melbourne Heart	1–2	Perth Glory	Melbourne
Sunday, 16:00 AEDT	Sarkies 66'	Report	Smeltz 16'; McGarry 68'	Stadium: AAMI Park; Attendance: 7,223; Referee: Chris Beath

18 January 2012 17	Melbourne Heart	0–1	Central Coast Mariners	Melbourne
Wednesday, 19:30 AEDT		Report	Kwasnik 89'	Stadium: AAMI Park; Attendance: 5,522; Referee: Strebre Delovski

21 January 2011 18	Melbourne Heart	1–1	Brisbane Roar	Melbourne
Saturday, 19:45 AEDT	Germano 31'	Report	Berisha 69'	Stadium: AAMI Park; Attendance: 7,118; Referee: Chris Beath

29 January 2011 19	Wellington Phoenix	3–1	Melbourne Heart	Wellington
Sunday, 16:30 NZDT	Ifill 3', 64'; Greenacre 53'	Report	Alex Terra 35'	Stadium: Westpac Stadium; Attendance: 13,601; Referee: Peter Green

4 February 2012 20	Melbourne Heart	0–0	Melbourne Victory	Melbourne
Saturday, 20:00 AEDT		Report		Stadium: AAMI Park; Attendance: 26,395; Referee: Jarred Gillett

11 February 2012 21	Newcastle Jets	3–0	Melbourne Heart	Newcastle
Saturday, 17:30 AEDT	Brockie 23'; Griffiths 47'; Bridges 76'	Report		Stadium: Ausgrid Stadium; Attendance: 10,619; Referee: Ryan Shepheard

17 February 2012 22	Melbourne Heart	1–0	Gold Coast United	Melbourne
Friday, 20:00 AEDT	Babalj 79'	Report		Stadium: AAMI Park; Attendance: 4,972; Referee: Alan Milliner

26 February 2012 23	Melbourne Heart	1–0	Central Coast Mariners	Melbourne
Sunday, 17:00 AEDT	Babalj 50'	Report		Stadium: AAMI Park; Attendance: 5,034; Referee: Jarred Gillett

2 March 2012 24	Brisbane Roar	1–1	Melbourne Heart	Brisbane
Friday, 19:00 AEST	Nichols 32'	Report	Good 49'	Stadium: Suncorp Stadium; Attendance: 10,998; Referee: Ryan Shepheard

10 March 2012 25	Melbourne Heart	1–1	Wellington Phoenix	Melbourne
Saturday, 17:30 AEDT	Babalj 32'	Report	Ifill 80'	Stadium: AAMI Park; Attendance: 6,759; Referee: Peter Green

17 March 2012 26	Melbourne Heart	2–2	Sydney FC	Melbourne
Saturday, 19:45 AEDT	Dugandžić 31'; Babalj 36'		Jamieson 66', 77'	Stadium: AAMI Park; Attendance: 7,498

23 March 2012 27	Adelaide United	1–1	Melbourne Heart	Adelaide
Friday 19:30	van Dijk 37' (pen.)	Report	Babalj 68'	Stadium: Hindmarsh Stadium; Attendance: 6,411; Referee: Adam Kersey

==== Finals series ====
1 April 2012 Elimination-finals	Perth Glory	3–0	Melbourne Heart	Perth
17:00 AWST (UTC+8)	Smeltz 65', 72', 90+2'	Report		Stadium: nib Stadium; Attendance: 12,600; Referee: Jarred Gillett

=== Hawaiian Islands Invitational ===
The 2012 Hawaiian Islands Invitational took place from 23–25 February 2012 at Aloha Stadium in Honolulu, Hawaii. Taking part in the Invitational were to be Japan's Yokohama FC, South Korea's Busan IPark and reigning MLS Cup winners the Colorado Rapids. Due to the competitions scheduling, Melbourne Heart were forced to field their youth team due to the competition overlaps with the domestic A-League season.

23 February 2012 Semi-final	Busan IPark (South Korea)	0–0 (4–3 p)	(Australia) Melbourne Heart	Honolulu, United States
6:00pm UTC−10		Report		Stadium: Aloha Stadium; Attendance: 7,388; Referee: Hilario Grajeda
	Penalties
	Kwang-Hee (penalty scored); Dong-Min (penalty scored); Jong-Won (penalty missed); Mota (penalty scored); Fágner (penalty missed); Jin-Ho (penalty missed); Ji-Hoon (penalty scored)		(penalty scored) Z. Walker; (penalty scored) Bosnjak; (penalty scored) Groenwald; (penalty missed) Paterson; (penalty missed) Trifiro; (penalty missed) Gray; (penalty missed) Grossman

25 February 2012 Third place play-off	Melbourne Heart (Australia)	0–1	(United States) Colorado Rapids	Honolulu, United States
5:00pm UTC−10		Report	Cascio 30'	Stadium: Aloha Stadium; Attendance: 10,073; Referee: Richard Salazar

=== National Youth League ===
==== League table ====
Pos	Team	Pld	W	D	L	GF	GA	GD	Pts
1	Central Coast Mariners Academy (C)	18	11	3	4	41	16	+25	36
2	Brisbane Roar Youth	18	9	5	4	50	33	+17	32
3	Perth Glory Youth	18	9	5	4	36	31	+5	32
4	Gold Coast United Youth	18	7	5	6	33	30	+3	26
5	Melbourne Heart Youth	18	8	2	8	35	37	−2	26
6	Sydney FC Youth	18	7	4	7	40	31	+9	25
7	Adelaide United Youth	18	6	5	7	30	34	−4	23
8	Newcastle Jets Youth	18	5	5	8	27	29	−2	20
9	AIS Football Program	18	5	1	12	28	59	−31	16
10	Melbourne Victory Youth	18	4	3	11	15	34	−19	15

Rules for classification: 1) points; 2) goal difference; 3) number of goals scored.
(C) Champions

==== Matches ====
23 October 2011 1	Melbourne Heart	2–0	Melbourne Victory	Melbourne
14:00 AEDT	Andrijasevic 33'; Z Walker 76'	Report		Stadium: John Cain Memorial Park

29 October 2011 2	Sydney FC	5–1	Melbourne Heart	Sydney
12:00 AEDT	Lum 19' (pen.); Mallia 32', 65', 87'; Rufer 81'	Report	Kalmar 27'	Stadium: Leichhardt Oval

5 November 2011 3	Adelaide United	0–1	Melbourne Heart	Adelaide
16:30 ACDT		Report	Babalj 35'	Stadium: Burton Park

13 November 2011 4	Melbourne Heart	3–1	Newcastle Jets	Melbourne
15:00 AEDT	Worm 2'; Groenewald 64'; Z Walker 74'	Report	Haliti 23'	Stadium: John Cain Memorial Park

19 November 2011 5	Gold Coast United	3–2	Melbourne Heart	Gold Coast
15:00 AEST	Lucas 12'; Bowles 51'; Barker-Daish 63'	Report	Goodwin 71', 75'	Stadium: Owen Park

27 November 2011 6	Melbourne Heart	2–1	Central Coast Mariners	Melbourne
14:30 AEDT	Andrijasevic 53'; Z Walker 86'	Report	Hayward 73' (pen.)	Stadium: John Cain Memorial Park

3 December 2011 7	Australian Institute of Sport	0–2	Melbourne Heart	Canberra
16:00 AEDT		Report	Oxborrow 13' (o.g.); Williams 23'	Stadium: AIS Athletics Track

11 December 2011 8	Brisbane Roar	2–5	Melbourne Heart	Brisbane
15:00 AEST	Groenewald 4' (o.g.); Thurtell 8'	Report	Williams 70', 88'; Z Walker 75', 76', 85'	Stadium: Suncorp Stadium

18 December 2011 9	Perth Glory	3–0	Melbourne Heart	Perth
17:00 WST	Taggart 28'; Arnez 59'; Makarounas 90+2'	Report		Stadium: 6PR Stadium

7 January 2012 10	Melbourne Heart	1–3	Sydney FC	Melbourne
15:00 AEDT	Petreski 67'	Report	Powell 49', 90'; Chianese 73'	Stadium: John Cain Memorial Park

10 January 2012 17	Central Coast Mariners	3–1	Melbourne Heart	Gosford
16:00 AEDT	Treloar 7' (o.g.); Duke 57', 73'	Report	Z Walker 3'	Stadium: Plium Park

16 January 2012 11	Melbourne Heart	3–4	Perth Glory	Melbourne
10:00 AEDT	Bosnjak 11', 26' (pen.); J Walker 29'	Report	Treloar 13' (o.g.); Clisby 62'; Makeche 84'; Arnez 87'	Stadium: John Cain Memorial Park

22 January 2012 12	Melbourne Heart	1–5	Brisbane Roar	Melbourne
16:00 AEDT	Goodwin 63'	Report	Fitzgerald 7'; Thurtell 49', 75'; Lambadaridis 73'; Cirjak 90'	Stadium: John Cain Memorial Park

28 January 2012 13	Melbourne Heart	2–2	Gold Coast United	Melbourne
16:00 AEDT	Goodwin 6'; Zahra 27'	Report	Severino 21'; Russell 77'	Stadium: John Cain Memorial Park

5 February 2012 14	Melbourne Victory	2–1	Melbourne Heart	Melbourne
16:00 AEDT		[ Report]	Zahra 32'	Stadium: Kingston Heath

12 February 2012 15	Melbourne Heart	1–1	Adelaide United	Melbourne
15:00 AEDT	Z Walker 24'	[ Report]		Stadium: John Cain Memorial Park

18 February 2012 16	Melbourne Heart	4–0	Australian Institute of Sport	Melbourne
15:00 AEDT	Z Walker 39', 58', 84'; Peluso 90+1'	[ Report]		Stadium: John Cain Memorial Park

4 March 2012 18	Newcastle Jets	2–3	Melbourne Heart	Newcastle
15:00 AEDT	Bradbery 28'; Virgili 90+1'	[ Report]	Kalmar 30'; Williams 50'; Zac Walker 75' (pen.)	Stadium: Adamstown Oval

== Statistics ==
=== Overall ===
Players in italics left the club mid-season.

			A-League				A-League Finals Series				Total			
Nation	No.	Name	GS	App.	Min.	Goal	GS	App.	Min.	Goal	GS	App.	Min.	Goal
Goalkeepers
(Australia)	1	Bolton	25	25	2250	0	1	1	90	0	26	26	2340	0
(Australia)	24	Roganovic	2	2	180	0	0	0	0	0	2	2	180	0
Defenders
(Australia)	2	Marrone	27	27	2430	0	1	1	90	0	28	28	2520	0
(Australia)	3	Hamill	17	22	1480	1	1	1	90	0	18	23	1570	1
(Australia)	4	Colosimo	13	16	1149	0	0	0	0	0	13	16	1149	0
(Australia)	16	Behich	22	23	2000	1	1	1	90	0	23	24	2090	1
(Australia)	18	Good	18	23	1091	1	1	1	90	0	19	24	1181	1
(Australia)	25	Madaschi	8	9	726	0	0	0	0	0	8	9	726	0
(Australia)	27	Goodwin	3	4	298	0	0	0	0	0	3	4	298	0
Midfielders
(Brazil)	5	Fred	17	18	1357	1	1	1	90	0	18	19	1447	1
(Australia)	6	Thompson	24	25	2056	4	1	1	46	0	25	26	2102	4
(Netherlands)	7	Worm	14	19	1131	0	0	1	44	0	14	20	1175	0
(Australia)	8	Sarkies	5	6	460	2	0	0	0	0	5	6	460	2
(Australia)	10	Srhoj	16	16	1334	0	1	1	90	0	17	17	1424	0
(Argentina)	13	Germano	18	21	1577	3	1	1	90	0	19	22	1667	3
(Australia)	26	Reid	2	4	207	0	0	0	0	0	2	4	207	0
(Australia)	14	Ibrahim	0	0	0	0	0	0	0	0	0	0	0	0
(Australia)	20	Zahra	0	0	0	0	0	0	0	0	0	0	0	0
(Australia)	21	Taseski	0	0	0	0	0	0	0	0	0	0	0	0
(Australia)	22	Kalmar	0	2	74	0	0	1	9	0	0	3	83	0
(Australia)	23	Dugandžić	21	22	1788	7	1	1	81	0	22	23	1869	7
Forwards
(Brazil)	9	Maycon	5	13	489	1	0	0	0	0	5	13	489	1
(Brazil)	11	Terra	11	23	1099	3	0	0	0	0	11	23	1099	3
(Australia)	15	Williams	7	15	773	1	0	0	0	0	7	15	773	1
(Australia)	17	Hoffman	5	15	636	1	0	0	0	0	5	15	636	1
(Australia)	19	Babalj	17	21	1501	9	1	1	90	0	18	22	1591	9

=== Goal-scorers ===
Total	Player		Goals per round																													
	Player				1	2	3	4	5	6	7	8	9	10	11	12	13	14	15	16	17	18	19	20	21	22	23	24	25	26	27	F
9	(Australia)	Babalj								1		1			1	1								1	1		1	1	1	0		
7	(Australia)	Dugandzic	2					1			1		1		1													1		0		
4	(Australia)	Thompson							1				1	2																0		
3	(Argentina)	Germano							1			1								1										0		
3	(Brazil)	Alex Terra												1	1						1									0		
2	(Australia)	Sarkies															1	1												0		
1	(Australia)	Williams		1																										0		
1	(Brazil)	Maycon				1																								0		
1	(Australia)	Hamill					1																							0		
1	(Brazil)	Fred						1																						0		
1	(Australia)	Behich						1																						0		
1	(Australia)	Hoffman													1															0		
1	(Australia)	Good																								1				0		
35	Total		2	1	0	1	1	3	2	1	1	2	2	3	4	1	1	1	0	1	1	0	0	1	1	1	1	2	1	0		

=== Disciplinary records ===
No.	Pos.	Nat.	Player	Yellow card	Yellow card Red card	Red card
10	MF	(Australia)	Wayne Srhoj	9	0	0
4	DF	(Australia)	Simon Colosimo	5	1	0
6	MF	(Australia)	Matt Thompson	5	0	0
19	FW	(Australia)	Eli Babalj	4	0	0
16	DF	(Australia)	Aziz Behich	4	0	0
7	FW	(Netherlands)	Rutger Worm	4	0	0
18	DF	(Australia)	Curtis Good	3	1	0
5	MF	(Brazil)	Fred	3	0	0
13	MF	(Argentina)	Jonatan Germano	3	0	0
2	DF	(Australia)	Michael Marrone	3	0	0
3	DF	(Australia)	Brendan Hamill	2	0	0
17	FW	(Australia)	Jason Hoffman	2	0	0
26	MF	(Australia)	Paul Reid	2	0	0
1	GK	(Australia)	Clint Bolton	1	0	0
23	MF	(Australia)	Mate Dugandzic	1	0	0
25	DF	(Australia)	Adrian Madaschi	1	0	0
9	FW	(Brazil)	Maycon	1	0	0
24	GK	(Australia)	Nikola Roganovic	1	0	0
8	MF	(Australia)	Kristian Sarkies	1	0	0
11	FW	(Brazil)	Alex Terra	1	0	0
15	FW	(Australia)	David Williams	1	0	0
