= 2011–12 A-League =

35th season of top-tier soccer league in Australia

A-League
- Season: 2011–12
- Dates: 8 October 2011 – 22 April 2012
- Champions: Brisbane Roar (2nd title)
- Premiers: Central Coast Mariners (2nd title)
- Champions League: Central Coast Mariners; Brisbane Roar
- Matches: 135
- Goals: 365 (2.7 per match)
- Top goalscorer: Besart Berisha (19 goals)
- Best goalkeeper: Mathew Ryan
- Biggest home win: Brisbane Roar 7–1 Adelaide United (28 October 2011)
- Biggest away win: Adelaide United 0–4 Central Coast Mariners (2 December 2011); Sydney FC 0–4 Melbourne Heart (29 December 2011)
- Highest scoring: Brisbane Roar 7–1 Adelaide United (28 October 2011); Perth Glory 4–2 Melbourne Victory (24 March 2012)
- Longest winning run: Central Coast Mariners (6)
- Longest unbeaten run: Central Coast Mariners (15)
- Longest winless run: Gold Coast United (13)
- Longest losing run: Brisbane Roar; Gold Coast United (5)
- Highest attendance: 40,351
- Lowest attendance: 1,141
- Average attendance: 10,488 ( 2,095)

The 2011–12 A-League was the 35th season of top-flight soccer in Australia, and the seventh season of the Australian A-League soccer competition since its establishment in 2004. At the end of the previous season, the North Queensland Fury were cut from the competition by the governing body, Football Federation Australia, due to financial reasons.

== Clubs ==

Team	City	Home Ground	Capacity
Adelaide United	Adelaide	Hindmarsh Stadium	17,000
Brisbane Roar	Brisbane	Suncorp Stadium	52,500
Central Coast Mariners	Gosford	Bluetongue Stadium	20,119
Gold Coast United	Gold Coast	Skilled Park	27,400
Melbourne Heart	Melbourne	AAMI Park	30,050
Melbourne Victory	Melbourne	Etihad Stadium; AAMI Park	55,000; 30,050
Newcastle Jets	Newcastle	Ausgrid Stadium	33,000
Perth Glory	Perth	NIB Stadium	20,500
Sydney FC	Sydney	Sydney Football Stadium	45,500
Wellington Phoenix	Wellington	Westpac Stadium	36,000

=== Personnel and kits ===
Team	Manager	Captain	Kit manufacturer	Jersey sponsor
Adelaide United	(Australia) John Kosmina	(Australia) Eugene Galeković	Erreà	Coopers
Brisbane Roar	(Australia) Ange Postecoglou	(Australia) Matt Smith	Puma	The Coffee Club
Central Coast Mariners	(Australia) Graham Arnold	(Australia) Alex Wilkinson	Hummel	Soccer5s
Gold Coast United	(England) Mike Mulvey	(Australia) Michael Thwaite	Fi-ta	Hyatt Regency Coolum
Melbourne Heart	(Netherlands) John van 't Schip	(Brazil) Fred	ISC	Westpac
Melbourne Victory	(Northern Ireland) Jim Magilton	(Australia) Adrian Leijer	Adidas	Adecco
Newcastle Jets	(Australia) Gary van Egmond	(Australia) Jobe Wheelhouse	ISC	Hunter Ports
Perth Glory	(Scotland) Ian Ferguson	(Australia) Jacob Burns	X-blades	QBE Insurance
Sydney FC	(Czech Republic) Vítězslav Lavička	(Northern Ireland) Terry McFlynn	Adidas	UNICEF
Wellington Phoenix	(New Zealand) Ricki Herbert	(Australia) Andrew Durante	Adidas	Sony

=== Managerial changes ===
Team	Outgoing manager	Manner of departure	Date of vacancy	Position in table	Incoming manager	Date of appointment
Newcastle Jets	(Australia) Branko Čulina	Sacked	4 October 2011	Pre-season	(Australia) Gary van Egmond	20 October 2011
Adelaide United	(Netherlands) Rini Coolen	Sacked	18 December 2011	9th	(Australia) John Kosmina	18 December 2011
Melbourne Victory	(Australia) Mehmet Durakovic	Sacked	6 January 2012	8th	(Northern Ireland) Jim Magilton	7 January 2012
Gold Coast United	(Israel) Miron Bleiberg	Sacked/Resigned	19 February 2012	10th	(England) Mike Mulvey	20 February 2012

=== Foreign players ===
Club	Visa 1	Visa 2	Visa 3	Visa 4	Visa 5	Non-Visa foreigner(s)	Former player(s)
Adelaide United	(Brazil) Cássio	(Indonesia) Sergio van Dijk	(Ukraine) Yevhen Levchenko	(Uruguay) Francisco Usúcar		(Philippines) Iain Ramsay^{2} (Portugal) Ricardo^{1}	
Brisbane Roar	(Albania) Besart Berisha	(Bahrain) Sayed Mohamed Adnan	(Brazil) Henrique	(Canada) Issey Nakajima-Farran	(Germany) Thomas Broich	(Sri Lanka) Jack Hingert^{2}	
Central Coast Mariners	(England) John Sutton	(Netherlands) Patrick Zwaanswijk	(New Zealand) Michael McGlinchey			(Malta) John Hutchinson^{2} (Papua New Guinea) Brad McDonald^{2}	
Gold Coast United	(Brazil) Robson	(Ivory Coast) Adama Traoré	(Netherlands) Paul Beekmans	(Netherlands) Peter Jungschläger	(Netherlands) Maceo Rigters	(Croatia) Ante Rožić^{2} (Eritrea) Samuel Tesfagabr^{1} (Eritrea) Ambesager Yosief^{1} (New Zealand) Glen Moss^{2}	(Ivory Coast) Jonas Salley^{1} (United States) Alex Smith
Melbourne Heart	(Argentina) Jonatan Germano	(Brazil) Fred	(Brazil) Maycon	(Brazil) Alex Terra	(Netherlands) Rutger Worm		
Melbourne Victory	(Brazil) Fábio	(Costa Rica) Carlos Hernández	(Costa Rica) Jean Carlos Solórzano	(New Zealand) Marco Rojas	(Spain) Ubay Luzardo	(Scotland) Grant Brebner^{1}	
Newcastle Jets	(Brazil) Tiago	(England) Michael Bridges	(England) Francis Jeffers	(New Zealand) Jeremy Brockie	(South Korea) Byun Sung-hwan	(Iraq) Ali Abbas^{1}	
Perth Glory	(Republic of Ireland) Billy Mehmet	(Republic of Ireland) Liam Miller	(Netherlands) Bas van den Brink	(Netherlands) Victor Sikora	(Scotland) Steven McGarry	(Brazil) Andrezinho^{3} (New Zealand) Shane Smeltz^{2} (Zambia) Ndumba Makeche^{1}	
Sydney FC	(Brazil) Bruno Cazarine	(Finland) Juho Mäkelä	(Japan) Hirofumi Moriyasu	(Netherlands) Pascal Bosschaart	(Slovakia) Karol Kisel	(Northern Ireland) Terry McFlynn^{1}	
Wellington Phoenix	(Barbados) Paul Ifill	(England) Chris Greenacre	(Spain) Dani Sánchez	(Trinidad and Tobago) Tony Warner	(United States) Alex Smith	(Brazil) Daniel^{1} (Malta) Manny Muscat^{2}	

The following do not fill a Visa position:
^{1}Those players who were born and started their professional career abroad but have since gained Australian Residency (and New Zealand Residency, in the case of Wellington Phoenix);
^{2}Australian residents (and New Zealand residents, in the case of Wellington Phoenix) who have chosen to represent another national team;
^{3}Injury Replacement Players, or National Team Replacement Players;
^{4}Guest Players (eligible to play a maximum of ten games)

=== Salary cap exemptions and captains ===
Club	Australian Marquee	International Marquee	Junior Marquee	Captain	Vice-Captain
Adelaide United	(Australia) Dario Vidosic	(Indonesia) Sergio van Dijk	None	(Australia) Jon McKain (Australia) Eugene Galekovic (Note: Galekovic replaced McKain as captain mid-season.)	(Brazil) Cássio
Brisbane Roar	None	None	None	(Australia) Matt Smith	(Australia) Shane Stefanutto
Central Coast Mariners	None	None	(Australia) Oliver Bozanic	(Australia) Alex Wilkinson	None
Gold Coast United	None	None	(Australia) Tahj Minniecon	(Australia) Michael Thwaite	(Netherlands) Paul Beekmans (New Zealand) Glen Moss
Melbourne Heart	None	(Brazil) Fred	None	(Brazil) Fred	(Australia) Matt Thompson
Melbourne Victory	(Australia) Archie Thompson	(Australia) Harry Kewell	None	(Australia) Adrian Leijer	(Australia) Archie Thompson
Newcastle Jets	None	None	None	(Australia) Jobe Wheelhouse	(Australia) Kasey Wehrman
Perth Glory	(Australia) Mile Sterjovski	(New Zealand) Shane Smeltz	None	(Australia) Jacob Burns	(Australia) Chris Coyne
Sydney FC	(Australia) Nick Carle	(Australia) Brett Emerton	None	(Northern Ireland) Terry McFlynn	(Australia) Alex Brosque
Wellington Phoenix	None	None	None	(New Zealand) Andrew Durante	(New Zealand) Tim Brown

== Regular season ==
=== League table ===
Pos	Team	Pld	W	D	L	GF	GA	GD	Pts	Qualification
1	Central Coast Mariners	27	15	6	6	40	24	+16	51	Qualification for 2013 AFC Champions League group stage and finals series (Note: First place qualifies for the 2013 AFC Champions League group stage. Winning the 2012 A-League Grand Final automatically earns qualification for the 2013 AFC Champions League qualifying play-off, unless first place are champions.)
2	Brisbane Roar (C)	27	14	7	6	50	28	+22	49	Qualification for 2013 AFC Champions League qualifying play-off and finals series
3	Perth Glory	27	13	4	10	40	35	+5	43	Qualification for Finals series
4	Wellington Phoenix	27	12	4	11	34	32	+2	40	Qualification for Finals series
5	Sydney FC	27	10	8	9	37	42	−5	38	Qualification for Finals series
6	Melbourne Heart	27	9	10	8	35	34	+1	37	Qualification for Finals series
7	Newcastle Jets	27	10	5	12	38	41	−3	35	
8	Melbourne Victory	27	6	11	10	35	43	−8	29	
9	Adelaide United	27	5	10	12	26	44	−18	25	
10	Gold Coast United	27	4	9	14	30	42	−12	21	

Source: ultimatealeague.com
Rules for classification: 1) points; 2) goal difference; 3) number of goals scored.
(C) Champions

=== Home and away season ===
The 2011–12 season saw each team play 27 games, host 13 and play 1 regional game over 25 rounds. On 4 January, over 11 hours of soccer was broadcast with all matches aired back to back starting in Wellington and ending in Perth. The season began on 8 October 2011 and concluded on 22 April 2012. All times are local unless otherwise stated.

==== Round 1 ====
8 October 2011 4:30pm, Saturday	Newcastle Jets	3–2	Melbourne Heart	Ausgrid Stadium, Newcastle
4:30pm AEDT	R. Griffiths 31', 45'; S. Byun 90+3'	(2–1); Summary	23', 51' M. Duganzdic	Attendance: 12,467; Referee: Ryan Shepheard

8 October 2011 6:30pm, Saturday	Melbourne Victory	0–0	Sydney FC	Etihad Stadium, Melbourne
6:30pm AEDT		(0–0); Summary		Attendance: 40,351; Referee: Peter Green

8 October 2011 7:45pm, Saturday	Brisbane Roar	1–0	Central Coast Mariners	Suncorp Stadium, Brisbane
7:45pm AEST; 8:45pm AEDT	M. Nichols 72'	(0–0); Summary		Attendance: 13,467; Referee: Chris Beath

9 October 2011 5:00pm, Sunday	Gold Coast United	1–1	Wellington Phoenix	Skilled Park, Gold Coast
17:00 AEDT; 19:00 NZDT	J. Brown 87'	(0–1); Report Summary	17' C. Greenagcre	Attendance: 4,113; Referee: Gerard Parsons

9 October 2011 4:30pm, Sunday	Perth Glory	1–0	Adelaide United	nib Stadium, Perth
4:30pm AWST; 7:30pm AEDT	B. Mehmet 76'	(0–0); Summary		Attendance: 9,452; Referee: Jarred Gillett

==== Round 2 ====
14 October 2011 7:30pm, Friday	Adelaide United	1–0	Melbourne Victory	Hindmarsh Stadium, Adelaide
19:30 ACDT; 20:00 AEDT	S. van Dijk 52'	(0–0); Summary		Attendance: 14,753; Referee: Ben Williams

15 October 2011 5:30pm, Saturday	Central Coast Mariners	1–1	Gold Coast United	Bluetongue Stadium, Gosford
17:30 AEDT	P. Zwaanswijk 87'	(0–0); Summary	47' J. Brown	Attendance: 10,374; Referee: (New Zealand) Peter O'Leary

15 October 2011 7:45pm, Saturday	Sydney FC	0–2	Brisbane Roar	Sydney Football Stadium, Sydney
19:45 AEDT		(0–1); Summary	43' Berisha; 72' Broich	Attendance: 15,789; Referee: Strebre Delovski

16 October 2011 4:30pm, Sunday	Wellington Phoenix	2–0	Newcastle Jets	Westpac Stadium, Wellington
16:30 NZDT; 14:30 AEDT	T. Brown 18'; Daniel 60'	(1–0); Report; Summary		Attendance: 7,643; Referee: Matthew Gillett

16 October 2011 5:00pm, Sunday	Melbourne Heart	1–2	Perth Glory	AAMI Park, Melbourne
17:00 AEDT	D. Williams 45' (pen.)	(1–1); Summary	34', 67' S. Smeltz	Attendance: 7,229; Referee: Gerard Parsons

==== Round 3 ====
21 October 2011 7:30pm, Friday	Brisbane Roar	3–0	Gold Coast United	Suncorp Stadium, Brisbane
19:30 AEST	E. Paartalu 15'; B. Berisha 61'; M. Nichols 79'	(1–0); Summary		Attendance: 13,425; Referee: Peter Green

22 October 2011 5:00pm, Saturday	Adelaide United	1–2	Sydney FC	Hindmarsh Stadium, Adelaide
17:00 ACDT; 17:30 AEDT	D. Vidošić 36'	(1–0); Summary	60' J. Coyne; 81' N. Carle	Attendance: 12,054; Referee: Gerard Parsons

22 October 2011 7:45pm, Saturday	Melbourne Victory	0–0	Melbourne Heart	Etihad Stadium, Melbourne
19:45 AEDT		(0–0); Summary		Attendance: 39,309; Referee: Strebre Delovski

23 October 2011 5:00pm, Sunday	Newcastle Jets	1–0	Central Coast Mariners	Ausgrid Stadium, Newcastle
17:00 AEDT	J. Brockie 24'	(1–0); Summary		Attendance: 14,421; Referee: Jarred Gillett

23 October 2011 4:30pm, Sunday	Perth Glory	1–0	Wellington Phoenix	nib Stadium, Perth
16:30 AWST; 21:30 NZDT	S. Smeltz 32'	(1–0); Summary		Attendance: 8,299; Referee: Ben Williams

==== Round 4 ====
28 October 2011 7:00pm, Friday	Brisbane Roar	7–1	Adelaide United	Suncorp Stadium, Brisbane
19:00 AEST; 20:00 AEDT	Henrique 21' (pen.), 36' (pen.); B. Berisha 23', 27', 29', 69'; I. Nakajima-Farran 80'	(5–1); Summary	5' D. Vidošić	Attendance: 11,762; Referee: Strebre Delovski

29 October 2011 5:30, Saturday	Central Coast Mariners	2–1	Perth Glory	Bluetongue Stadium, Gosford
17:30 AEDT	M. Simon 27'; B. Ibini-Isei 45'	(2–1); Summary	6' T. Dodd	Attendance: 6,883; Referee: Ryan Shepheard

29 October 2011 7:45pm, Saturday	Melbourne Heart	1–1	Sydney FC	AAMI Park, Melbourne
19:45 AEDT	Maycon 85'	(0–0); Summary	90+4' N. Carle	Attendance: 5,666; Referee: Chris Beath

30 October 2011 4:30pm, Sunday	Wellington Phoenix	1–2	Melbourne Victory	Westpac Stadium, Wellington
16:30 NZDT; 14:30 AEDT	D. Sánchez 71'	(0–1); Report; Summary	42' A. Thompson; 67' (pen.) C. Hernández	Attendance: 9,369; Referee: Peter Green

30 October 2011 4:00pm, Sunday	Gold Coast United	3–1	Newcastle Jets	Skilled Park, Gold Coast
16:00 AEST; 17:00 AEDT	M. Rigters 12'; K. Rees 58'; J. Brown 84'	(1–0); Summary	68' J. Wheelhouse	Attendance: 2,947; Referee: Kris Griffiths-Jones

==== Round 5 ====
4 November 2011 7:30pm, Friday	Wellington Phoenix	1–2	Central Coast Mariners	Westpac Stadium, Wellington
19:30 NZDT; 17:30 AEDT	C. Greenacre 68'	(0–0); Report; Summary	47' B. Ibini-Isei; 80' M. Simon	Attendance: 5,090; Referee: Gerard Parsons

4 November 2011 7:30pm, Friday	Adelaide United	1–1	Melbourne Heart	Hindmarsh Stadium, Adelaide
19:30 ACDT; 20:00 AEDT	S. Dilevski 77'	(0–0); Summary	48' B. Hamill	Attendance: 10,294; Referee: Jarred Gillett

5 November 2011 5:30pm, Saturday	Newcastle Jets	2–0	Perth Glory	Ausgrid Stadium, Newcastle
17:30 AEDT	J. Brockie 10', 11'	(2–0); Report; Summary		Attendance: 12,383; Referee: Strebre Delovski

5 November 2011 7:45pm, Saturday	Melbourne Victory	2–2	Brisbane Roar	Etihad Stadium, Melbourne
19:45 AEDT	A. Thompson 10', 21'	(2–2); Report; Summary	6' (pen.) Henrique; 27' T. Broich	Attendance: 24,820; Referee: Ben Williams

6 November 2011 5:00pm, Sunday	Sydney FC	3–2	Gold Coast United	Sydney Football Stadium, Sydney
17:00 AEDT	B. Cazarine 60'; N. Carle 62'; K. Kisel 90+4' (pen.)	(0–1); Report; Summary	21' K. Rees; 46' D. MacAllister	Attendance: 11,051; Referee: Peter Green

==== Round 6 ====
11 November 2011 8:00pm, Friday	Gold Coast United	1–2	Adelaide United	Hindmarsh Stadium, Adelaide
19:00 AEST; 20:00 AEDT	J. Brown 67'	(0–0); Summary	57' Z. Caravella; 69' I. Ramsay	Attendance: 6,368; Referee: Chris Beath

12 November 2011 5:30pm, Saturday	Melbourne Heart	3–0	Newcastle Jets	AAMI Park, Melbourne
17:30 AEDT	Fred 66'; M. Dugandzic 73'; A. Behich 85'	(0–0); Summary		Attendance: 5,914; Referee: Kurt Ams

12 November 2011 7:45pm, Saturday	Central Coast Mariners	0–0	Melbourne Victory	Bluetongue Stadium, Gosford
19:45 AEDT		(0–0); Summary		Attendance: 10,251; Referee: Strebre Delovski

12 November 2011 7:00pm, Saturday	Perth Glory	0–1	Sydney FC	nib Stadium, Perth
19:00 AWST; 22:00 AEDT		(0–1); Summary	45' M. Bridge	Attendance: 9,046; Referee: Gerard Parsons

13 November 2011 5:00pm, Sunday	Brisbane Roar	1–1	Wellington Phoenix	Suncorp Stadium, Brisbane
17:00 AEDT; 19:00 NZDT	B. Berisha 11'	(1–1); Report; Summary	37' T. Brown	Attendance: 16,428; Referee: Jarred Gillett

==== Round 7 ====
18 November 2011 7:00pm, Friday	Gold Coast United	1–2	Melbourne Heart	Skilled Park, Gold Coast
19:00 AEST; 20:00 AEDT	P. Jungschläger 63'	(0–1); Summary	4' M. Thompson; 68' J. Germano	Attendance: 4,031; Referee: (New Zealand) Peter O'Leary

19 November 2011 5:00pm, Saturday	Wellington Phoenix	1–1	Adelaide United	Eden Park, Auckland
17:00 NZDT; 19:30 ACST	N. Boogard 83' (o.g.)	(0–1); Report; Summary	44' B. Djite	Attendance: 20,078; Referee: Peter Green

19 November 2011 5:30pm, Saturday	Newcastle Jets	1–2	Brisbane Roar	Ausgrid Stadium, Newcastle
17:30 AEDT	R. Griffiths 45'	(1–0); Summary	56' Henrique; 83' J. Meyer	Attendance: 13,174; Referee: Gerard Parsons

19 November 2011 7:45pm, Saturday	Sydney FC	2–3	Central Coast Mariners	Sydney Football Stadium, Sydney
19:45 AEDT	N. Carle 77'; B. Emerton 88'	(0–1); Summary	41' P. Zwaanswijk; 66' M. McGlinchey; 82' T. Hearfield	Attendance: 13,947; Referee: Strebre Delovski

20 November 2011 5:00pm, Sunday	Melbourne Victory	2–2	Perth Glory	Etihad Stadium, Melbourne
17:00 AEDT	C. Hernandez 52' (pen.); D. Allsopp 57'	(0–0); Summary	70' Andrezinho; 86' S. Smeltz	Attendance: 18,404; Referee: Chris Beath

==== Round 8 ====
25 November 2011 7:30pm, Friday	Adelaide United	0–0	Newcastle Jets	Hindmarsh Stadium, Adelaide
19:30 ACDT; 20:00 AEDT		(0–0); Summary		Attendance: 8,403; Referee: Matthew Gillett

26 November 2011 5:30pm, Saturday	Central Coast Mariners	3–1	Melbourne Heart	Bluetongue Stadium, Gosford
17:30 AEDT	M. Simon 45'; D. McBreen 81' (pen.); P. Zwaanswijk 86'	(1–0); Summary	78' E. Babalj	Attendance: 7,242; Referee: Gerard Parsons

26 November 2011 6:45pm, Saturday	Brisbane Roar	4–0	Perth Glory	Suncorp Stadium, Brisbane
18:45 AEST; 19:45 AEDT	B. Berisha 23', 45'; I. Nakajima-Farran 33', 41'	(4–0); Summary		Attendance: 19,339; Referee: Jarred Gillett

27 November 2011 4:30pm, Sunday	Wellington Phoenix	2–1	Sydney FC	Westpac Stadium, Wellington
16:30 NZDT; 14:30 AEDT	P. Ifill 7'; T. Brown 59'	(1–0); Report; Summary	70' B. Cazarine	Attendance: 6,308; Referee: Ryan Shepheard

27 November 2011 5:00pm, Sunday	Melbourne Victory	3–2	Gold Coast United	AAMI Park, Melbourne
17:00 AEDT	H. Kewell 3' (pen.); C. Hernández 22' (pen.), 79'	(2–1); Summary	45' (pen.) D. Macallister; 47' P. Jungschläger	Attendance: 16,522; Referee: Kris Griffiths-Jones

==== Round 9 ====
2 December 2011 7:30pm, Friday	Adelaide United	0–4	Central Coast Mariners	Hindmarsh Stadium, Adelaide
19:30 ACDT; 20:00 AEDT		(0–3); Summary	30' M. Amini; 32' B. Ibini; 38' (pen.) P. Zwaanswijk; 66' R. Griffiths	Attendance: 8,437; Referee: Kris Griffiths-Jones

3 December 2011 7:45pm, Saturday	Newcastle Jets	3–1	Melbourne Victory	Ausgrid Stadium, Newcastle
19:45 AEDT	R. Griffiths 27' (pen.), 88'; L. Haliti 47'	(1–1); Summary	20' C. Hernández	Attendance: 17,245; Referee: Jarred Gillett

3 December 2011 7:00pm, Saturday	Perth Glory	2–0	Gold Coast United	nib Stadium, Perth
19:00 AWST; 21:00 AEST	M. Sterjovski 20' (pen.); S. Smeltz 54' (pen.)	(1–0); Summary		Attendance: 6,484; Referee: Strebre Delovski

4 December 2011 3:00pm, Sunday	Melbourne Heart	1–0	Wellington Phoenix	Latrobe City Stadium, Morwell
15:00 AEDT; 17:00 NZDT	M. Dugandzic 40'	(1–0); Summary; Report		Attendance: 2,951; Referee: Ben Williams

4 December 2011 5:00pm, Sunday	Sydney FC	2–0	Brisbane Roar	WIN Jubilee Oval, Carlton
17:00 AEDT	D. Petratos 1'; B. Emerton 20'	(2–0); Summary		Attendance: 11,555; Referee: Peter Green

Midweek Fixture (Note: Game was postponed due to severe weather in Perth, preventing travel for Perth Glory.)

18 January 2012 5:30pm, Wednesday	Sydney FC	1–1	Perth Glory	Campbelltown Stadium, Campbelltown
17:30 AEDT	M. Bridge 45'	(1–0); Summary	88' A. Hughes	Attendance: 5,505; Referee: Matthew Gillett

==== Round 10 ====
9 December 2011 7:00pm, Friday	Brisbane Roar	1–2	Melbourne Heart	Suncorp Stadium, Brisbane
19:00 AEST; 20:00 AEDT	M. Nichols 77'	(0–2); Summary	11' J. Germano; 26' E. Babalj	Attendance: 10,667; Referee: Kris Griffiths-Jones

10 December 2011 5:00pm, Saturday	Wellington Phoenix	1–0	Perth Glory	Westpac Stadium, Wellington
17:00 NZDT; 12:00 AWST	B. Sigmund 85'	(0–0); Summary; Report		Attendance: 6,020; Referee: Ryan Shepheard

10 December 2011 5:30pm, Saturday	Central Coast Mariners	2–0	Newcastle Jets	Bluetongue Stadium, Gosford
17:30 AEDT	R. Griffiths 25'; M. Simon 58'	(1–0); Summary		Attendance: 10,643; Referee: Strebre Delovski

10 December 2011 7:45pm, Saturday	Melbourne Victory	1–1	Adelaide United	Etihad Stadium, Melbourne
19:45 AEDT	A. Thompson 59'	(0–0); Summary	82' F. Barbiero	Attendance: 16,562; Referee: Peter Green

11 December 2011 4:00pm, Sunday	Gold Coast United	0–0	Sydney FC	Skilled Park, Gold Coast
16:00 AEST; 17:00 AEDT		(0–0); Summary		Attendance: 2,984; Referee: Ben Williams

Midweek Fixture

14 December 2011 7:30pm, Wednesday	Wellington Phoenix	2–0	Brisbane Roar	Forsyth Barr Stadium, Dunedin
19:30 NZDT; 17:30 AEDT	P. Ifill 26'; N. Ward 80'	(1–0); Summary; Report		Attendance: 4,628; Referee: Gerard Parsons

==== Round 11 ====
16 December 2011 7:30pm, Friday	Adelaide United	0–3	Gold Coast United	Hindmarsh Stadium, Adelaide
19:30 ACDT; 20:00 AEDT		(0–2); Summary	18' B. Halloran; 36' M. Rigters; 90+3' D. MacAllister	Attendance: 7,967; Referee: Ryan Shepheard

17 December 2011 5:30pm, Saturday	Newcastle Jets	1–2	Sydney FC	Ausgrid Stadium, Newcastle
17:30 AEDT	J. Brockie 25'	(1–0); Summary	59' B. Cazarine	Attendance: 13,658; Referee: Chris Beath; 84' J. Mäkelä

17 December 2011 6:45pm, Saturday	Brisbane Roar	1–2	Central Coast Mariners	Suncorp Stadium, Brisbane
18:45 AEST; 19:45 AEDT	K. Danning 83'	(0–2); Summary	6' M. Amini; 45+2' P. Bojic	Attendance: 10,006; Referee: Peter Green

17 December 2011 7:00pm, Saturday	Perth Glory	1–2	Melbourne Heart	nib Stadium, Perth
19:00 AWST; 22:00 AEDT	B. Mehmet 35'	(1–1); Summary	33' M. Thompson; 87' M. Dugandzic	Attendance: 6,458; Referee: Jarred Gillett

18 December 2011 5:00pm, Sunday	Melbourne Victory	3–1	Wellington Phoenix	AAMI Park, Melbourne
17:00 AEDT; 19:00 NZDT	A. Thompson 3'; V. Lia 22' (o.g.); D. Ferreira 24'	(3–0); Summary; Report	84' A. Smith	Attendance: 14,023; Referee: Matthew Gillett

==== Round 12 ====
22 December 2011 7:30pm, Thursday	Sydney FC	2–2	Adelaide United	Sydney Football Stadium, Sydney
19:30 AEDT	K. Kisel 19' (pen.); D. Petratos 66'	(1–1); Summary	8' D. Mullen; 56' D. Vidošić	Attendance: 10,212; Referee: Jarred Gillett

23 December 2011 7:30pm, Friday	Wellington Phoenix	5–2	Newcastle Jets	Westpac Stadium, Wellington
19:30 NZDT; 17:30 AEDT	D. Sánchez 15', 33'; C. Greenacre 38'; M. Pavlovic 73', 76'	(3–0); Summary; Report	50' S. Byun; 88' R. Griffiths	Attendance: 6,471; Referee: Ben Williams

23 December 2011 8:00pm, Friday	Melbourne Heart	3–2	Melbourne Victory	AAMI Park, Melbourne
20:00 AEDT	M. Thompson 37', 39'; A. Terra 62'	(2–1); Summary	21' A. Thompson; 90' C. Hernández	Attendance: 26,579; Referee: Strebre Delovski

23 December 2011 7:00pm, Friday	Perth Glory	1–3	Central Coast Mariners	nib Stadium, Perth
19:00 AWST; 22:00 AEDT	S. McGarry 83'	(0–0); Summary	49' B. Ibini-Isei; 59' P. Bojić; 64' M. Simon	Attendance: 6,620; Referee: Matthew Gillett

26 December 2011 6:30pm, Monday	Gold Coast United	1–0	Brisbane Roar	Skilled Park, Gold Coast
18:30 AEST; 19:30 AEDT	D. Severino 88' (pen.)	(0–0); Summary		Attendance: 6,927; Referee: Kris Griffiths-Jones

==== Round 13 ====
29 December 2011 7:30pm, Thursday	Sydney FC	0–4	Melbourne Heart	Sydney Football Stadium, Sydney
19:30 AEDT		(0–2); Summary	32' E. Babalj; 45+1' M. Dugandzic; 77' J. Hoffman; 84' A. Terra	Attendance: 16,007; Referee: Peter Green

30 December 2011 7:30pm, Friday	Adelaide United	2–0	Wellington Phoenix	Hindmarsh Stadium, Adelaide
19:30 ACDT; 22:00 NZDT	B. Djite 17'; A. Golec 62'	(1–0); Summary; Report		Attendance: 9,739; Referee: Chris Beath

31 December 2011 4:00pm, Saturday	Newcastle Jets	1–1	Perth Glory	Ausgrid Stadium, Newcastle
16:00 AEDT	F. Jeffers 61'	(0–1); Summary	9' B. Mehmet	Attendance: 10,434; Referee: Strebre Delovski

31 December 2011 6:15pm, Saturday	Central Coast Mariners	0–0	Gold Coast United	Bluetongue Stadium, Gosford
18:15 AEDT		(0–0); Summary		Attendance: 14,838; Referee: Ryan Shepheard

31 December 2011 7:30pm, Saturday	Brisbane Roar	3–1	Melbourne Victory	Suncorp Stadium, Brisbane
19:30 AEST; 20:30 AEDT	M. Nichols 44'; R. Visconte 50'; I. Franjic 53'	(1–1); Summary	3' H. Kewell	Attendance: 14,852; Referee: Jarred Gillett

==== Midweek Round ====
4 January 2012 3:00pm, Wednesday	Wellington Phoenix	4–2	Sydney FC	Westpac Stadium, Wellington
15:00 NZDT; 13:00 AEDT	Daniel 24' (pen.); D. Sánchez 41'; Ben Sigmund 77'; Paul Ifill 90+4'	(2–1); Summary; Report	15' (pen.) B. Emerton; 63' B. Cazarine	Attendance: 8,411; Referee: Alan Milliner

4 January 2012 3:15pm, Wednesday	Melbourne Heart	1–3	Adelaide United	AAMI Park, Melbourne
15:15 AEDT	E. Babalj 90+2'	(0–1); Summary	37' (pen.), 78' S. van Dijk; 48' D. Vidosic	Attendance: 8,272; Referee: Kris Griffiths-Jones

4 January 2012 5:30pm, Wednesday	Newcastle Jets	3–2	Gold Coast United	Ausgrid Stadium, Newcastle
17:30 AEDT	J. Brockie 44', 65'; L. Haliti 73'	(1–0); Summary	72' B. Halloran; 78' A. Traoré	Attendance: 9,311; Referee: Gerard Parsons

4 January 2012 7:45pm, Wednesday	Central Coast Mariners	2–0	Melbourne Victory	Bluetongue Stadium, Gosford
19:45 AEDT	M. Simon 1', 84'	(1–0); Summary		Attendance: 12,284; Referee: Peter Green

4 January 2012 7:00pm, Wednesday	Perth Glory	3–3	Brisbane Roar	nib Stadium, Perth
19:00 AWST; 22:00 AEDT	T. Dodd 16'; M. Sterjovski 24', 80' (pen.)	(2–2); Summary	40', 69' M. Nichols; 45' E. Paartalu	Attendance: 6,912; Referee: Chris Beath

==== Round 14 ====
7 January 2012 5:00pm, Saturday	Adelaide United	1–1	Brisbane Roar	Hindmarsh Stadium, Adelaide
17:00 ACDT; 17:30 AEDT	S. van Dijk 78' (pen.)	(0–0); Summary	60' I. Nakajima-Farran	Attendance: 11,274; Referee: Ben Williams

7 January 2012 7:45pm, Saturday	Melbourne Victory	2–1	Newcastle Jets	AAMI Park, Melbourne
19:45 AEDT	S. Byun 7', 75' (o.g.)	(1–0); Summary	85' R. Griffiths	Attendance: 14,897; Referee: Ryan Shepheard

8 January 2012 4:00pm, Sunday	Wellington Phoenix	0–1	Perth Glory	Westpac Stadium, Wellington
16:00 NZDT; 22:00 AWST		(0–0); Summary; Report	90+2' J. Mitchell	Attendance: 3,898; Referee: Kris Griffiths-Jones

8 January 2012 4:00pm, Sunday	Sydney FC	0–1	Central Coast Mariners	Sydney Football Stadium, Sydney
16:00 AEDT		(0–1); Summary	9' O. Bozanic	Attendance: 11,866; Referee: Jarred Gillett

8 January 2012 5:30pm, Sunday	Gold Coast United	1–1	Melbourne Heart	Skilled Park, Gold Coast
17:30 AEST; 18:30 AEDT	M. Rigters 72'	(0–1); Summary	8' K. Sarkies	Attendance: 2,081; Referee: Matthew Gillett

==== Round 15 ====
13 January 2012 8:00pm, Friday	Melbourne Victory	1–1	Adelaide United	AAMI Park, Melbourne
20:00 AEDT	A. Thompson 6'	(1–0); Summary	53' S. van Dijk	Attendance: 20,959; Referee: Jarred Gillett

14 January 2012 5:30pm, Saturday	Central Coast Mariners	1–1	Newcastle Jets	Bluetongue Stadium, Gosford
17:30 AEDT	P. Zwaanswijk 59'	(0–1); Summary	16' L. Haliti	Attendance: 10,904; Referee: Matthew Gillett

14 January 2012 6:45pm, Saturday	Brisbane Roar	2–1	Sydney FC	Suncorp Stadium, Brisbane
18:45 AEST; 19:45 AEDT	S. Adnan 90+4'; B. Berisha 90+5'	(0–1); Summary	39' M. Bridge	Attendance: 14,545; Referee: Ryan Shepheard

15 January 2012 4:00pm, Sunday	Melbourne Heart	1–2	Perth Glory	AAMI Park, Melbourne
16:00 AEDT	K. Sarkies 65'; 67' S. McGarry	(0–1); Summary	15' S. Smeltz	Attendance: 7,233; Referee: Chris Beath

15 January 2012 6:30pm, Sunday	Gold Coast United	0–1	Wellington Phoenix	Skilled Park, Gold Coast
18:30 AEDT; 20:30 NZDT		(0–0); Summary; Report	87' T. Brown	Attendance: 2,135; Referee: Kurt Ams

Midweek Fixture

18 January 2012 7:30pm, Wednesday	Melbourne Heart	0–1	Central Coast Mariners	AAMI Park, Melbourne
19:30 AEDT		(0–0); Summary	89' A. Kwasnik	Attendance: 5,522; Referee: Strebre Delovski

==== Round 16 ====
20 January 2012 8:00pm, Friday	Newcastle Jets	0–1	Wellington Phoenix	Ausgrid Stadium, Newcastle
20:00 AEDT; 22:00 NZDT		(0–0); Summary; Report	57' M. Muscat	Attendance: 11,694; Referee: Matthew Gillett

21 January 2012 5:30pm, Saturday	Central Coast Mariners	3–2	Adelaide United	Bluetongue Stadium, Gosford
17:30 AEDT	D. McBreen 14'; A. Kwasnik 74'; J. Rose 77'	(1–2); Summary	15' S. van Dijk; 18' B. Djite	Attendance: 7,478; Referee: Kris Griffiths-Jones

21 January 2012 7:45pm, Saturday	Melbourne Heart	1–1	Brisbane Roar	AAMI Park, Melbourne
19:45 AEDT	J. Germano 31'	(1–0); Summary	69' B. Berisha	Attendance: 7,118; Referee: Chris Beath

22 January 2012 5:00pm, Sunday	Sydney FC	2–1	Gold Coast United	Sydney Football Stadium, Sydney
17:00 AEDT	K. Kisel 71'; B. Cazarine 89'	(0–0); Summary	55' B. Halloran	Attendance: 8,541; Referee: Strebre Delovski

22 January 2012 4:30pm, Sunday	Perth Glory	4–1	Melbourne Victory	nib Stadium, Perth
19:30 AEDT	S. Smeltz 13', 34' (pen.); M. Sterjovski 41' (pen.); Andrezinho 88'	(3–0); Summary	67' (pen.) H. Kewell	Attendance: 12,358; Referee: Peter Green

Midweek Fixture

25 January 2012 7:30pm, Wednesday	Adelaide United	1–1	Newcastle Jets	Carrington Park, Bathurst
19:30 AEDT	S. van Dijk 57'	(0–0); Summary	72' J. Wheelhouse	Attendance: 2,363; Referee: Alan Milliner

==== Round 17 ====
26 January 2012 4:00pm, Thursday	Melbourne Victory	2–2	Sydney FC	AAMI Park, Melbourne
16:00 AEDT	I. Cernak 45'; Fabinho 45+2'	(2–0); Summary	56' B. Cazarine; 89' S. Ryall	Attendance: 20,053; Referee: Strebre Delovski

28 January 2012 6:45pm, Saturday	Brisbane Roar	0–1	Newcastle Jets	Suncorp Stadium, Brisbane
19:45 AEDT		(0–1); Summary	23' B. Kantarovski	Attendance: 9,293; Referee: Ben Williams

29 January 2012 4:30pm, Sunday	Wellington Phoenix	3–1	Melbourne Heart	Westpac Stadium, Wellington
16:30 NZDT; 18:30 AEDT	P. Ifill 3', 64'; C. Greenacre 54'	(1–1); Summary; Report	34' A. Terra	Attendance: 13,601; Referee: Peter Green

29 January 2012 4:30pm, Sunday	Adelaide United	0–3	Perth Glory	Hindmarsh Stadium, Adelaide
16:30 AEDT		(0–2); Summary	14' S. Smeltz; 20' S. McGarry; 82' L. Miller	Attendance: 9,063; Referee: Jarred Gillett

Midweek Fixture

1 February 2012 7:30pm, Wednesday	Melbourne Victory	1–1	Gold Coast United	Aurora Stadium, Launceston
19:30 AEDT	H. Kewell 65'	(0–0); Summary	90' M. Thwaite	Attendance: 5,268; Referee: Matthew Gillett

==== Round 18 ====
3 February 2012 7:30pm, Friday	Adelaide United	1–2	Wellington Phoenix	Hindmarsh Stadium, Adelaide
19:30 ACDT	B. Djite 9'	(1–2); Summary; Report	13' T. Brown; 38' D. Sánchez	Attendance: 8,425; Referee: Gerard Parsons

4 February 2012 5:30pm, Saturday	Central Coast Mariners	0–2	Brisbane Roar	Bluetongue Stadium, Gosford
17:30 AEDT		(0–2); Summary	5' E. Paartalu; 38' B. Berisha	Attendance: 10,217; Referee: Kris Griffiths-Jones

4 February 2012 7:45pm, Saturday	Melbourne Heart	0–0	Melbourne Victory	AAMI Park, Melbourne
19:45 AEDT		(0–0); Summary		Attendance: 26,395; Referee: Jarred Gillett

5 February 2012 5:00pm, Sunday	Sydney FC	2–5	Newcastle Jets	Sydney Football Stadium, Sydney
17:00 AEDT	H. Moriyasu 47'; M. Beauchamp 72'	(0–3); Summary	22' N. Topor-Stanley; 29' R. Zadkovich; 38', 87' J. Brockie; 90+5' A. Abbas	Attendance: 10,232; Referee: Matthew Gillett

6 February 2012 7:00pm, Monday	Perth Glory	4–0	Gold Coast United	nib Stadium, Perth
19:00 AWST; 22:00 AEDT	S. McGarry 18'; L. Miller 53'; T. Dodd 67'; A. Traore 84' (o.g.)	(1–0); Summary		Attendance: 7,681; Referee: Alan Milliner

==== Round 19 ====
10 February 2012 8:00pm, Friday	Melbourne Victory	2–1	Central Coast Mariners	AAMI Park, Melbourne
20:00 AEDT	C. Hernández 14'; H. Kewell 51'	(1–1); Summary	8' T. Rogic	Attendance: 14,060; Referee: Peter Green

11 February 2012 5:30pm, Saturday	Newcastle Jets	3–0	Melbourne Heart	Ausgrid Stadium, Newcastle
17:30 AEDT	J. Brockie 23'; R. Griffiths 47'; M. Bridges 76'	(1–0); Summary		Attendance: 10,619; Referee: Ryan Shepheard

11 February 2012 7:45pm, Saturday	Sydney FC	2–1	Perth Glory	Sydney Football Stadium, Sydney
19:45 AEDT	B. Emerton 54'; B. Cazarine 72'	(0–0); Summary	86' B. Mehmet	Attendance: 8,508; Referee: Strebre Delovski

12 February 2012 5:00pm, Sunday	Wellington Phoenix	0–2	Brisbane Roar	Westpac Stadium, Wellington
17:00 NZDT; 15:00 AEDT		(0–1); Summary; Report	42' B. Berisha; 80' M. Nichols	Attendance: 13,009; Referee: Jarred Gillett

12 February 2012 4:30pm, Sunday	Gold Coast United	1–2	Adelaide United	Skilled Park, Gold Coast
17:30 AEDT; 16:30 AEDT	N. Boogaard 7' (o.g.)	(1–1); Summary	42' B. Djite; 60' D. Vidosic	Attendance: 1,723; Referee: Chris Beath

==== Round 20 ====
17 February 2012 8:00pm, Friday	Melbourne Heart	1–0	Gold Coast United	AAMI Park, Melbourne
20:00 AEDT	E. Babalj 80'	(0–0); Summary		Attendance: 4,972; Referee: Alan Milliner

18 February 2012 5:30pm, Saturday	Central Coast Mariners	2–0	Wellington Phoenix	Bluetongue Stadium, Gosford
17:30 AEDT; 19:30 NZDT	T. Rogic 52'; P. Zwaanwijk 83'	(0–0); Summary; Report		Attendance: 7,845; Referee: Strebre Delovski

18 February 2012 6:45pm, Saturday	Brisbane Roar	3–2	Melbourne Victory	Suncorp Stadium, Brisbane
18:45 AEST; 19:45 AEDT	B. Berisha 1', 32'; Henrique 38' (pen.)	(3–1); Summary	9', 50' H. Kewell	Attendance: 18,523; Referee: Jarred Gillett

18 February 2012 7:00pm, Saturday	Perth Glory	2–0	Newcastle Jets	nib Stadium, Perth
19:00 AWST; 22:00 AEDT		(1–0); Summary		Attendance: 8,108; Referee: Ben Williams

19 February 2012 4:30pm, Sunday	Adelaide United	1–2	Sydney FC	Hindmarsh Stadium, Adelaide
16:30 ACDT; 17:00 AEDT		(:); Summary		Attendance: 8,259; Referee: Kris Griffiths-Jones

Postponed Round 17 Fixture (Note: Game was postponed due to risk of flooding in the Gold Coast.)

22 February 2012 7:00pm, Wednesday	Gold Coast United	3–3	Central Coast Mariners	Skilled Park, Gold Coast
19:00 AEST; 20:00 AEDT	C. Harold 9' (pen.); B. Halloran 17'; M. Cooper 56'	(2–1); Summary	4', 66' A. Kwasnik; 59' B. Ibini-Isei	Attendance: 1,141; Referee: Matthew Gillett

==== Round 21 ====
24 February 2012 8:00pm, Friday	Newcastle Jets	1–0	Adelaide United	Ausgrid Stadium, Newcastle
20:00 AEDT	T. Elrich 39'	(1–0); Summary		Attendance: 10,383; Referee: Ben Williams

25 February 2012 5:30pm, Saturday	Sydney FC	0–1	Wellington Phoenix	Sydney Football Stadium, Sydney
17:30 AEDT; 19:30 NZDT		(0–1); Summary; Report	13' P. Ifill	Attendance: 10,165; Referee: Peter Green

25 February 2012 6:45pm, Saturday	Gold Coast United	1–1	Melbourne Victory	Skilled Park, Gold Coast
18:45 AEST; 19:45 AEDT	M. Rigters 51'	(0–0); Summary	56' C. Hernández	Attendance: 2,109; Referee: Regis Queffelec

25 February 2012 7:00pm, Saturday	Perth Glory	0–3	Brisbane Roar	nib Stadium, Perth
22:00 AEDT		(0–1); Summary	21' Henrique; 59', 63' B. Berisha	Attendance: 10,367; Referee: Strebre Delovski

26 February 2012 5:00pm, Sunday	Melbourne Heart	1–0	Central Coast Mariners	AAMI Park, Melbourne
17:00 AEDT	E. Babalj 50'	(0–0); Summary		Attendance: 5,034; Referee: Jarred Gillett

==== Round 22 ====
1 March 2012 7:30pm, Thursday	Adelaide United	0–2	Perth Glory	Hindmarsh Stadium, Adelaide
19:30 ACDT; 20:00 AEDT		(0–2); Summary	6' B. Mehmet; 24' J. Burns	Attendance: 5,898; Referee: Matthew Gillett

2 March 2012 7:00pm, Friday	Brisbane Roar	1–1	Melbourne Heart	Suncorp Stadium, Brisbane
19:00 AEST; 20:00 AEDT	M. Nichols 32'	(1–0); Summary	49' C. Good	Attendance: 10,988; Referee: Ryan Shepheard

3 March 2012 5:30pm, Saturday	Melbourne Victory	1–3	Newcastle Jets	AAMI Park, Melbourne
17:30 AEDT	H. Kewell 24' (pen.)	(1–3); Summary	20' R. Griffiths; 29', 39' J. Pepper	Attendance: 12,457; Referee: Jarred Gillett

3 March 2012 7:45pm, Saturday	Central Coast Mariners	1–1	Sydney FC	Bluetongue Stadium, Gosford
19:45 AEDT	T. Hearfield 90'	(0–0); Summary	55' J. Chianese	Attendance: 8,658; Referee: Chris Beath

4 March 2012 4:30pm, Sunday	Wellington Phoenix	2–0	Gold Coast United	Westpac Stadium, Wellington
16:30 NZDT; 19:30 AEST	A. Durante 29'; N. Ward 90+2'	(1–0); Summary; Report		Attendance: 7,431; Referee: Kris Griffiths-Jones

==== Round 23 ====
9 March 2012 8:00pm, Friday	Newcastle Jets	1–1	Gold Coast United	Ausgrid Stadium, Newcastle
20:00 AEDT	N. Topor-Stanley 90'	(0–1); Summary	24' D. Bowles	Attendance: 10,258; Referee: Ryan Shepheard

10 March 2012 5:30pm, Saturday	Melbourne Heart	1–1	Wellington Phoenix	AAMI Park, Melbourne
17:30 AEDT; 19:30 NZDT	E .Babalj 32'	(1–0); Summary; Report	80' P. Ifill	Attendance: 6,759; Referee: Peter Green

10 March 2012 7:45pm, Saturday	Sydney FC	1–0	Melbourne Victory	Sydney Football Stadium, Sydney
19:45 AEDT	K. Kisel 33' (pen.)	(1–0); Summary		Attendance: 18,180; Referee: Ben Williams

11 March 2012 4:00pm, Sunday	Brisbane Roar	1–1	Adelaide United	Suncorp Stadium, Brisbane
16:00 AEST; 17:00 AEDT	B. Berisha 70'	(0–1); Summary	14' I. Ramsay	Attendance: 10,739; Referee: Strebre Delovski

11 March 2012 4:30pm, Sunday	Perth Glory	1–0	Central Coast Mariners	nib Stadium, Perth
16:30 AWST; 19:30 AEDT	T. Dodd 25'	(1–0); Summary		Attendance: 6,502; Referee: Chris Beath

==== Round 24 ====
16 March 2012 8:00pm, Friday	Melbourne Victory	3–0	Wellington Phoenix	AAMI Park, Melbourne
20:00 AEDT; 22:00 NZDT	C. Hernández 11'; I. Cernak 58'; J. Jeggo 89'	(1–0); Summary; Report		Attendance: 11,231; Referee: Chris Beath

17 March 2012 5:30pm, Saturday	Central Coast Mariners	1–0	Adelaide United	Bluetongue Stadium, Gosford
17:30 AEDT	B. Ibini-Isei 46'	(0–0); Summary		Attendance: 7,275; Referee: Ben Williams

17 March 2012 5:30pm, Saturday	Newcastle Jets	1–2	Brisbane Roar	Ausgrid Stadium, Newcastle
17:30 AEDT	A. Abbas 39'	(1–1); Summary	12' B. Berisha; 81' (pen.) M. Nichols	Attendance: 11,471; Referee: Jarred Gillett

17 March 2012 7:45pm, Saturday	Melbourne Heart	2–2	Sydney FC	AAMI Park, Melbourne
19:45 AEDT	M. Dugandzic 31'; E. Babalj 36'	(2–0); Summary	66', 77' S. Cole	Attendance: 7,498; Referee: Strebre Delovski

18 March 2012 5:30pm, Sunday	Gold Coast United	3–0	Perth Glory	Skilled Park, Gold Coast
17:30 AEST; 18:30 AEDT	Z. Anderson 6'; J. Brown 83', 90'	(1–0); Summary		Attendance: 1,720; Referee: Kris Griffiths-Jones

==== Round 25 ====
23 March 2012 7:30pm, Friday	Adelaide United	1–1	Melbourne Heart	Hindmarsh Stadium, Adelaide
7:30 ACDT; 8:00 AEDT	S. van Dijk 37' (pen.)	(1–0); Summary	68' E. Babalj	Attendance: 6,411; Referee: Adam Kersey

24 March 2012 6:30pm, Saturday	Perth Glory	4–2	Melbourne Victory	nib Stadium, Perth
6:30 AWST; 21:30 AEDT	S. Smeltz 22', 47', 62' (pen.), 65'	(1–2); Summary	21' C. Hernández; 45' M. Milligan	Attendance: 9,724; Referee: Alan Milliner

25 March 2012 4:00pm, Sunday	Wellington Phoenix	1–2	Central Coast Mariners	Westpac Stadium, Wellington
16:00 NZDT; 14:00 AEDT	L. Bertos 80'	(0–1); Summary; Report	45' J. Sutton; 51' B. Ibini-Isei	Attendance: 9,740; Referee: Strebre Delovski

25 March 2012 4:00pm, Sunday	Sydney FC	3–2	Newcastle Jets	Sydney Football Stadium, Sydney
16:00 AEDT	B. Cazarine 12'; J. Chianese 30', 33'	(3–1); Summary	26' M. Bridges; 84' J. Wheelhouse	Attendance: 14,494; Referee: Chris Beath

25 March 2012 5:30pm, Sunday	Gold Coast United	1–2	Brisbane Roar	Skilled Park, Gold Coast
17:30 AEST; 18:30 AEDT	D. Bowles 29'	(1–0); Summary	58' N. Fitzgerald; 90' G. Lambadaridis	Attendance: 6,102; Referee: Peter Green

=== Table of results ===
Abbreviation and Color Key: Adelaide United – AU; Brisbane Roar – BR; Central Coast Mariners – CCM; Gold Coast United – GCU; Melbourne Heart – MH; Melbourne Victory – MV; Newcastle Jets – NJ; Perth Glory – PG; Sydney FC – SFC; Wellington Phoenix – WP; Win; Loss; Draw; Home
Club	Match																										
Club	1	2	3	4	5	6	7	8	9	10	11	12	13	14	15	16	17	18	19	20	21	22	23	24	25	26	27
Adelaide United	PG	MV	SFC	BR	MH	GCU	WP	NUJ	CCM	MV	GCU	SFC	WP	MH	BR	MV	CCM	NUJ	PG	WP	GCU	SFC	NUJ	PG	BR	CCM	MH
Adelaide United	1–0	1–0	1–2	7–1	1–1	1–2	1–1	0–0	0–4	1–1	0–3	2–2	2–0	1–3	1–1	1–1	3–2	1–1	0–3	1–2	1–2	1–2	1–0	0–2	1–1	1–0	1–1
Brisbane Roar	CCM	SFC	GCU	AU	MV	WP	NUJ	PG	SFC	MH	WP	CCM	GCU	MV	PG	AU	SFC	MH	NUJ	CCM	WP	MV	PG	MH	AU	NUJ	GCU
Brisbane Roar	1–0	0–2	3–0	7–1	2–2	1–1	1–2	4–0	2–0	1–2	2–0	1–2	1–0	3–1	3–3	1–1	2–1	1–1	0–1	0–2	0–2	3–2	0–3	1–1	1–1	1–2	1–2
Central Coast Mariners	BR	GCU	NUJ	PG	WP	MV	SFC	MH	AU	NUJ	BR	PG	GCU	MV	SFC	NUJ	MH	AU	GCU	BR	MV	WP	MH	SFC	PG	AU	WP
Central Coast Mariners	1–0	1–1	1–0	2–1	1–2	0–0	2–3	3–1	0–4	2–0	1–2	1–3	0–0	2–0	0–1	1–1	0–1	3–2	3–3	0–2	2–1	2–0	1–0	1–1	1–0	1–0	1–2
Gold Coast United	WP	CCM	BR	NUJ	SFC	AU	MH	MV	PG	SFC	AU	BR	CCM	NUJ	MH	WP	SFC	CCM	MV	PG	AU	MH	MV	WP	NUJ	PG	BR
Gold Coast United	1–1	1–1	3–0	3–1	3–2	1–2	1–2	3–2	2–0	0–0	0–3	1–0	0–0	3–2	1–1	0–1	2–1	3–3	1–1	4–0	1–2	1–0	1–1	2–0	1–1	3–0	1–2
Melbourne Heart	NUJ	PG	MV	SFC	AU	NUJ	GCU	CCM	WP	BR	PG	MV	SFC	AU	GCU	PG	CCM	BR	WP	MV	NUJ	GCU	CCM	BR	WP	SFC	AU
Melbourne Heart	3–2	1–2	0–0	1–1	1–1	3–0	1–2	3–1	1–0	1–2	1–2	3–2	0–4	1–3	1–1	1–2	0–1	1–1	3–1	0–0	3–0	1–0	1–0	1–1	1–1	2–2	1–1
Melbourne Victory	SFC	AU	MH	WP	BR	CCM	PG	GCU	NUJ	AU	WP	MH	BR	CCM	NUJ	AU	PG	SFC	GCU	MH	CCM	BR	GCU	NUJ	SFC	WP	PG
Melbourne Victory	0–0	1–0	0–0	1–2	2–2	0–0	2–2	3–2	3–1	1–1	3–1	3–2	3–1	2–0	2–1	1–1	4–1	2–2	1–1	0–0	2–1	3–2	1–1	1–3	1–0	3–0	4–2
Newcastle Jets	MH	WP	CCM	GCU	PG	MH	BR	AU	MV	CCM	SFC	WP	PG	GCU	MV	CCM	WP	AU	BR	SFC	MH	PG	AU	MV	GCU	BR	SFC
Newcastle Jets	3–2	2–0	1–0	3–1	2–0	3–0	1–2	0–0	3–1	2–0	1–2	5–2	1–1	3–2	2–1	1–1	0–1	1–1	0–1	2–5	3–0	2–0	1–0	1–3	1–1	1–2	3–2
Perth Glory	AU	MH	WP	CCM	NUJ	SFC	MV	BR	GCU	SFC	WP	MH	CCM	NUJ	BR	WP	MH	MV	AU	GCU	SFC	NUJ	BR	AU	CCM	GCU	MV
Perth Glory	1–0	1–2	1–0	2–1	2–0	0–1	2–2	4–0	2–0	1–1	1–0	1–2	1–3	1–1	3–3	0–1	1–2	4–1	0–3	4–0	2–1	2–0	0–3	0–2	1–0	0–3	4–2
Sydney FC	MV	BR	AU	MH	GCU	PG	CCM	WP	BR	PG	GCU	NUJ	AU	MH	WP	CCM	BR	GCU	MV	NUJ	PG	AU	WP	CCM	MV	MH	NUJ
Sydney FC	0–0	0–2	1–2	1–1	3–2	0–1	2–3	2–1	2–0	1–1	0–0	1–2	2–2	0–4	4–2	0–1	2–1	2–1	2–2	2–5	2–1	1–2	0–1	1–1	1–0	2–2	3–2
Wellington Phoenix	GCU	NUJ	PG	MV	CCM	BR	AU	SFC	MH	PG	BR	MV	NUJ	AU	SFC	PG	GCU	NUJ	MH	AU	BR	CCM	SFC	GCU	MH	MV	CCM
Wellington Phoenix	1–1	2–0	1–0	1–2	1–2	1–1	1–1	2–1	1–0	1–0	2–0	3–1	5–2	2–0	4–2	0–1	0–1	0–1	3–1	1–2	0–2	2–0	0–1	2–0	1–1	3–0	1–2

== Finals series ==
Elimination finals
3	Perth Glory	3
6	Melbourne Heart	0
4	Wellington Phoenix	3
5	Sydney FC	2

Semifinals
1	Central Coast Mariners	0	2
2	Brisbane Roar	2	3
Perth Glory	3
Wellington Phoenix	2

Preliminary final
Central Coast Mariners	1 (3)
Perth Glory (pen.)	1 (5)

Grand final
Brisbane Roar	2
Perth Glory	1

=== Elimination-finals ===
30 March 2012
20:00 NZDT (UTC+13:00)

Wellington Phoenix	3–2	Sydney FC
Brown 47'; Sigmund 80'; Ifill 86' (pen.)	Report	Chianese 81', 84'

Westpac Stadium, Wellington
Attendance: 10,019
Referee: Chris Beath

1 April 2012
17:00 AWST (UTC+08:00)

Perth Glory	3–0	Melbourne Heart
Smeltz 65', 72', 90+2'	Report

nib Stadium, Perth
Attendance: 12,600
Referee: Jarred Gillett

=== Semi-finals ===
31 March 2012
16:30 AEST (UTC+10:00)

Brisbane Roar	2–0	Central Coast Mariners
Henrique 9'; Paartalu 86'	Report

Suncorp Stadium, Brisbane
Attendance: 15,081
Referee: Strebre Delovski
8 April 2012
17:00 AEST (UTC+10:00)

Central Coast Mariners	2–3	Brisbane Roar
Zwaanswijk 29'; Kwasnik 32'	Report	Broich 2'; Nichols 26'; Henrique 68'

Bluetongue Stadium, Gosford
Attendance: 9,846
Referee: Jarred Gillett

Brisbane Roar won 5–2 on aggregate.

7 April 2012
17:30 AWST (UTC+08:00)

Perth Glory	3–2 (a.e.t.)	Wellington Phoenix
van den Brink 12'; Mehmet 71'; Howarth 111'	Report	Greenacre 46'; Muscat 54'

nib Stadium, Perth
Attendance: 13,695
Referee: Peter Green

=== Preliminary final ===
14 April 2012
16:00 AEST (UTC+10:00)

Central Coast Mariners	1–1 (a.e.t.)	Perth Glory
Kwasnik 34'	Report	Smeltz 37'
Penalties
McBreen (penalty scored); Wilkinson (penalty scored); Ryan (penalty scored); McGlinchey (penalty missed)	3–5	(penalty scored) Smeltz; (penalty scored) Mehmet; (penalty scored) Miller; (penalty scored) Heffernan; (penalty scored) Burns

Bluetongue Stadium, Gosford
Attendance: 7,572
Referee: Strebre Delovski

=== Grand Final ===
22 April 2012
16:00 AEST (UTC+10:00)

Brisbane Roar	2–1	Perth Glory
Berisha 84', 90+7' (pen.)	Report	Franjic 53' (o.g.)

Suncorp Stadium, Brisbane
Attendance: 50,334
Referee: Jarred Gillett

== Season statistics ==
=== Top scorers ===
As of end of regular season

Rank	Player	Club	Goals
1	(Albania) Besart Berisha	Brisbane Roar	19
2	(New Zealand) Shane Smeltz	Perth Glory	13
3	(Costa Rica) Carlos Hernández	Melbourne Victory	10
4	(Australia) Eli Babalj	Melbourne Heart	9
4	(New Zealand) Jeremy Brockie	Newcastle Jets	9
4	(Australia) Ryan Griffiths	Newcastle Jets	9
4	(Australia) Mitch Nichols	Brisbane Roar	9
8	(Brazil) Bruno Cazarine	Sydney FC	8
8	(Australia) Harry Kewell	Melbourne Victory	8
8	(Indonesia) Sergio van Dijk	Adelaide United	8

==== Own goals ====
As of end of regular season

Player		Team	Against	Week
(Australia)	Nigel Boogaard	Adelaide United	Wellington Phoenix	7
(Australia)	Vince Lia	Wellington Phoenix	Melbourne Victory	11
(South Korea)	Byun Sung-Hwan	Newcastle Jets	Melbourne Victory	14
(South Korea)	Byun Sung-Hwan	Newcastle Jets	Melbourne Victory	14
(Ivory Coast)	Adama Traoré	Gold Coast United	Perth Glory	18
(Australia)	Nigel Boogaard	Adelaide United	Gold Coast United	19

=== Attendances ===
These are the attendance records of each of the teams at the end of the home and away season. The table does not include finals series attendances.

Team	Hosted	Average	High	Low	Total
Melbourne Victory	13	20,281	40,351	11,231	263,648
Brisbane Roar	13	13,387	19,339	9,293	174,033
Newcastle Jets	13	12,117	17,245	9,311	157,518
Sydney FC	14	11,861	18,180	5,505	166,052
Central Coast Mariners	13	9,607	14,838	6,883	124,892
Melbourne Heart	14	9,082	26,579	2,951	127,142
Adelaide United	14	8,797	14,573	2,363	123,160
Wellington Phoenix	14	8,691	20,078	3,898	121,677
Perth Glory	13	8,315	12,358	6,484	108,101
Gold Coast United	14	3,546	6,927	1,141	49,649
League total	135	10,488	40,351	1,141	1,415,872

Updated to the 25 March 2012 note: Adelaide United's lowest crowd was at Bathurst's Carrington Park(NSW) as part of the regional round fixtures.

==== Top 10 Season Attendances ====
Attendance	Round	Date	Home	Score	Away	Venue	Weekday	Time of Day
50,334	GF	22 April 2012	Brisbane Roar	2–1	Perth Glory	Suncorp Stadium	Sunday	Afternoon
40,351	1	8 October 2011	Melbourne Victory	0–0	Sydney FC	Etihad Stadium	Saturday	Night
39,309	3	22 October 2011	Melbourne Victory	0–0	Melbourne Heart	Etihad Stadium	Saturday	Night
26,579	12	23 December 2011	Melbourne Heart	3–2	Melbourne Victory	AAMI Park	Friday	Night
26,395	18	4 February 2012	Melbourne Heart	0–0	Melbourne Victory	AAMI Park	Saturday	Night
24,820	5	5 November 2011	Melbourne Victory	2–2	Brisbane Roar	Etihad Stadium	Saturday	Night
20,959	15	13 January 2012	Melbourne Victory	1–1	Adelaide United	AAMI Park	Friday	Night
20,078	7	19 November 2011	Wellington Phoenix	1–1	Adelaide United	Eden Park	Saturday	Afternoon
20,053	17	26 January 2012	Melbourne Victory	2–2	Sydney FC	AAMI Park	Thursday	Afternoon
19,339	8	26 November 2011	Brisbane Roar	4–0	Perth Glory	Suncorp Stadium	Saturday	Night

=== Discipline ===
Updated to end of Week 17, 2 February 2012 The Fair Play Award will go to the team with the lowest points on the fair play table at the conclusion of the home and away season.

1 point	Yellow Card
2 points	Second Caution Red Card
3 points	Direct Red Card

Team	Yellow card	Yellow card Yellow card Red card	Red card	Points
Adelaide United	44	2	0	48
Brisbane Roar	30	0	1	33
Central Coast Mariners	33	0	0	33
Gold Coast United	38	2	0	42
Melbourne Heart	35	1	0	37
Melbourne Victory	34	2	4	50
Newcastle Jets	41	1	1	46
Perth Glory	35	0	3	44
Sydney FC	48	0	1	51
Wellington Phoenix	32	2	2	42
Totals	370	10	12	

- Wellington Phoenix's Nick Ward was given a straight red card that was later rescinded by the Match Review Panel.

== Awards ==
=== End-of-season awards ===
- Johnny Warren Medal – (Germany) Thomas Broich, Brisbane Roar
- NAB Young Footballer of the Year – (Australia) Mathew Ryan (Note: Mathew Ryan was named as NAB Young Footballer of the Year for the second year running.), Central Coast Mariners
- Nike Golden Boot Award – (Albania) Besart Berisha, Brisbane Roar, 19 Goals
- Goalkeeper of the Year – (Australia) Mathew Ryan, Central Coast Mariners
- Manager of the Year – (Australia) Graham Arnold, Central Coast Mariners
- Fair Play Award – Brisbane Roar
- Referee of the Year – (Australia) Jarred Gillett
- Foreign Player of the Year – (Germany) Thomas Broich, Brisbane Roar
- Solo Goal of the Year – (Costa Rica) Carlos Hernández, Melbourne Victory FC (Melbourne Victory v Central Coast Mariners, 10-Feb-12)

=== All-Star team ===
Formation: 3–4–3

Position	Name	Club
GK	(Australia) Matt Ryan	Central Coast Mariners
RB	(Australia) Michael Marrone	Melbourne Heart
CB	(Netherlands) Patrick Zwaanswijk	Central Coast Mariners
LB	(Australia) Joshua Rose	Central Coast Mariners
RM	(Australia) Mitch Nichols	Brisbane Roar
CM	(Germany) Thomas Broich	Brisbane Roar
CM	(Brazil) Fred	Melbourne Heart
LM	(Australia) Aziz Behich	Melbourne Heart
RF	(Barbados) Paul Ifill	Wellington Phoenix
ST	(Albania) Besart Berisha	Brisbane Roar
LF	(Australia) Archie Thompson	Melbourne Victory
Coach	(Australia) Graham Arnold	Central Coast Mariners
Substitutes:
GK	(Australia) Clint Bolton	Melbourne Heart
CB	(Australia) Andrew Durante	Wellington Phoenix
CM	(Australia) Nicky Carle	Sydney FC
CM	(Costa Rica) Carlos Hernandez	Melbourne Victory
LF	(Australia) Harry Kewell	Melbourne Victory

== See also ==
- 2011 Australian football code crowds

=== Team season articles ===
- 2011–12 Adelaide United season
- 2011–12 Brisbane Roar season
- 2011–12 Central Coast Mariners season
- 2011–12 Gold Coast United season
- 2011–12 Melbourne Heart season
- 2011–12 Melbourne Victory season
- 2011–12 Newcastle Jets season
- 2011–12 Perth Glory season
- 2011–12 Sydney FC season
- 2011–12 Wellington Phoenix season
