= Nikola Roganovic =

Serbian footballer (born 1985)

Personal information
- Full name: Nikola Roganovic
- Date of birth: 12 December 1985 (age 40)
- Place of birth: Belgrade, SR Serbia, SFR Yugoslavia
- Position: Goalkeeper

Team information
- Current team: South Melbourne FC
- Number: 1

Youth career
- 2001–2006: South Melbourne FC

Senior career*
Years	Team	Apps	(Gls)
2006–2007	Springvale White Eagles	22	(0)
2008	Frankston Pines	6	(0)
2008–2010	Altona Magic	44	(0)
2010–2011	Green Gully	46	(0)
2011–2012	Melbourne Heart	2	(0)
2012	Green Gully	19	(0)
2015–2017	South Melbourne	80	(0)
2018	Richmond SC	5	(0)
2018–2020	South Melbourne	56	(0)
- * Club domestic league appearances and goals as of 4 December 2020

Nikola Roganovic (Serbian Cyrillic: Никола Рогановић; born 12 December 1985) is a Serbian former footballer who last played for South Melbourne FC in the NPL Victoria.

== Club career ==
=== Victorian Premier League ===
Nikola Roganović began his senior career in 2006 with Springvale White Eagles FC, a Serbian-backed club. He won the 2009 VPL Grand Final with Altona Magic before switching to Green Gully and playing in their back-to-back Championships in 2010 and 2011.

=== Melbourne Heart ===
On 18 September 2011, he signed with A-League club Melbourne Heart. He Made his debut in the 2011–12 A-League season in Round 1 against Newcastle Jets. On 6 April 2012 it was announced that he would be leaving the club.

=== South Melbourne FC ===
After a two-year break from football, Roganovic returned to sign with South Melbourne FC in February 2015.

=== Short retirement and return to football ===
At the conclusion of the 2017 NPL Season, Nikola announced his retirement due to family and business commitments. However, during the 2018 season, Roganovic became an injury replacement keeper for Richmond in the State League 1. Following a series of strong performances, he re-signed during the mid-season transfer window with his former club South Melbourne for the remainder of the 2018 season. During the 2019 NPL Victoria season, Roganovic played his 100th game for South Melbourne against local rivals Melbourne Knights.

== Honours ==
=== Club ===
Green Gully

- Victorian Premier League Champions: 2010, 2011
- Victorian Premier League Premiers: 2011

Altona Magic

- Victorian Premier League Champions: 2008, 2009

South Melbourne FC

- National Youth League Champions: 2003
- Dockerty Cup: 2015
- National Premier Leagues Victoria Premiers: 2015
- NPL Victoria Champions: 2016

== Personal life ==
Nikola was born in Belgrade, Serbia on 12 December 1985. He is the younger brother of music producer Dragan Roganović (better known by the stage name of Dirty South).
