= Kamal Ibrahim (soccer) =

Australian footballer

Personal information
- Full name: Kamal Said Ibrahim
- Date of birth: 26 July 1992 (age 34)
- Place of birth: Addis Ababa, Ethiopia
- Height: 1.72 m (5 ft 7 1/2 in)
- Positions: Right winger; second striker

Youth career
- 2003–2005: Port Melbourne Sharks
- 2006: Altona East Phoenix
- 2007–2009: VIS
- 2009–2010: AIS

Senior career*
Years	Team	Apps	(Gls)
2010–2012	Melbourne Heart	4	(0)
2011	→ South Melbourne (loan)	11	(1)
2012	Heidelberg United	13	(1)
2013–2015	Port Melbourne	51	(11)
2016	Bentleigh Greens	14	(1)
2017	Avondale FC	11	(2)
2017	Melbourne Knights	9	(0)
2018–2020	Port Melbourne	57	(4)
2021–	Albion Rovers	28	(1)

International career^{‡}
2007–2008	Australia U17	17	(7)
2010	Australia U20	1	(0)
- * Club domestic league appearances and goals as of 6 December 2022 ‡ National team caps and goals as of 17:30, 31 August 2010 (UTC)

Kamal Said Ibrahim (Amharic: ካማል ዕብራህም; born 26 July 1992) is a professional footballer who plays for Albion Rovers FC in the Victorian State League 2.

== Early life ==
Ibrahim was born in Ethiopia and migrated to Victoria with his mother, three brothers and two sisters in 2003 to escape civil war and conflict.

== Club career ==
Ibrahim played for the VIS before earning a scholarship with AIS in 2009.

=== Melbourne Heart ===
In February 2010, he was signed by Melbourne Heart for its inaugural season on a multi-year deal. In August 2010, he was offered a 10-day trial with Polish club Legia Warszawa, which was ultimately unsuccessful. He made his début for Melbourne Heart in September 2010 against Brisbane Roar, suffering a four-nil defeat. He made a total of three appearances for the Heart, during a season in which he was hampered greatly by injuries.

==== South Melbourne (Loan) ====
After the 2010–11 A–League season, Ibrahim went on loan to VPL side South Melbourne for the 2011 Victorian Premier League season.

On 6 April 2012 it was announced that he would be leaving Melbourne Heart.

=== Victorian State Football ===
He signed for Heidelberg United for the remainder of the 2012 VPL season. After leaving Heidelberg at the end of 2012, Ibrahim signed with Port Melbourne in 2013. He won the NPL Victoria Gold Medal, the league best and fairest award, with Port Melbourne in 2015.

Ibrahim signed for reigning NPL Victoria champions Bentleigh Greens SC in mid-October, 2015, for the 2016 season. Ibrahim made his Bentleigh debut on 11 March 2016, playing 58 minutes in a 3–1 win over Avondale FC at Knights Stadium. Ibrahim scored his first goal for the Greens on 29 July 2016, in a 3–0 win over Green Gully SC in Round 23 of the NPL Victoria.

After leaving Bentleigh, Ibrahim signed for Avondale FC in December 2016. He moved to Melbourne Knights in June 2017.

== Personal life ==
In June 2011 Ibrahim was announced as the ambassador of Football Federation Victoria's "United Through Football" program, whose aim is to support those who have recently arrived in Australia from areas such as the Horn of Africa, Iraq, Afghanistan and Burma.

== Honours ==
With Australia:

- AFF U-19 Youth Championship: 2010
- AFF U-16 Youth Championship: 2008
