= Eli Babalj =

Australian soccer player (born 1992)

Personal information
- Full name: Eli Babalj
- Date of birth: 21 February 1992 (age 34)
- Place of birth: Sarajevo, SFR Yugoslavia
- Height: 1.95 m (6 ft 5 in)
- Position: Striker

Youth career
- 2007–2008: FW NTC
- 2008–2009: Perth Glory
- 2009–2010: AIS

Senior career*
Years	Team	Apps	(Gls)
2010–2012	Melbourne Heart	35	(11)
2012–2013	Red Star Belgrade	6	(1)
2013	Melbourne Heart	9	(1)
2013–2016	AZ Alkmaar	0	(0)
2015	→ PEC Zwolle (loan)	4	(0)
2015–2016	→ Adelaide United (loan)	5	(0)
2017	Adelaide United	4	(0)
2017–2018	Mladá Boleslav	2	(0)
2018	ATK	3	(0)
2019	Brisbane Roar	4	(0)
2019	Chainat Hornbill	7	(1)
2021–2022	Newcastle Jets	10	(1)

International career
2007–2009	Australia U17	8	(2)
2009–2011	Australia U20	11	(6)
2012	Australia	2	(2)

Managerial career
- 2023–2024: Newcastle Jets (Assistant)
- 2024–2025: Perth Glory U20
- 2026: Al Wasl FC U23 (Assistant)
- 2026-: Al-Ettifaq (Assistant)
Medal record
Representing Australia
Men's Association football
AFC U-20 Asian Cup
Runner-up	2010 China
- * Club domestic league appearances and goals as of 14 April 2022

Eli Babalj (born 21 February 1992) is a footballer who plays as a striker. Born in Sarajevo, he has represented Australia at international level. Alongside Robert Cornthwaite and Sasa Ognenovski, Babalj, at 1.95 m is the joint third tallest player to have represented the Australia national association football team, behind Zeljko Kalac (2.02 m) and Harry Souttar (1.98 m).

== Club career ==
Born in Sarajevo, SFR Yugoslavia, Babalj has spent the majority of his life in Australia and started off playing with Perth SC. In 2008, he was signed by Perth Glory for their Youth League team. However, he was signed by the AIS for the 2009–10 season in which the AIS came last, however Babalj managed to find the net 9 times.

=== Melbourne Heart ===
On 26 December it was announced that A-League expansion club Melbourne Heart had signed the then 17-year-old for their inaugural A-League 2010–11 season. He made his debut for the club in a friendly against Geelong All Stars XI and also scored his first goal in that match. He also took part in the friendly against Everton FC in which Heart lost 2–0. He made his debut for Melbourne Heart in the opening round of the 2010–11 A-League season against Central Coast Mariners at AAMI Park. During May 2012 it was announced that Serbian side Red Star Belgrade was scouting him.

=== Red Star Belgrade ===
On 7 June 2012 it was announced he had signed with Serbian Superliga contender Red Star Belgrade. He made his debut on 31 August 2012, against Bordeaux in the 2012–13 UEFA Europa League play-off round. He scored his first goal on his league debut against FK Smederevo on 29 September 2012.

=== Melbourne Heart ===
Eli Babalj made his return appearance to the A-League for the Melbourne Heart away to the Western Sydney Wanderers on Australia Day, 26 January 2013 as a 2nd half substitution.

=== AZ ===
On 19 April 2013, Dutch club AZ Alkmaar completed the signing of Eli for a fee believed to be in the region of $200,000.

==== Loan to PEC Zwolle ====
On 2 February 2015, Babalj was sent on loan at PEC Zwolle for the rest of the season. Eli Babalj made his Eredivisie debut for PEC Zwolle at home to the Go Ahead Eagles on 15 February 2015 as a 70th-minute substitute for Maikel van der Werff.

==== Loan to Adelaide United ====
On 24 July 2015, Alkmaar confirmed that they would allow Babalj to go out on loan back to Australia to Adelaide United for the 2015–16 A-League season. This would be Guillermo Amor's first signing for Adelaide as the new manager. Babalj made his debut for Adelaide United as a substitute in the 2015 FFA Cup in Darwin against Darwin Olympic. He also scored his first goal to help Adelaide to a 6–1 win.

On 22 January 2016, Babalj ruptured his anterior cruciate ligament against Brisbane Roar, ruling him out for the remainder of the A-League season.

=== Adelaide United ===
On 7 February 2017, after training with Adelaide United since late January, Babalj joined Adelaide United once more until the end of the season.

=== Mladá Boleslav ===
On 7 August 2017, Babalj signed with Czech club Mladá Boleslav.

=== ATK ===
Babalj signed with Indian Super League club ATK for the 2018–19 season. He made his first appearance on 28 November 2018 against FC Goa, coming on as a substitute in the 68th minute. The match ended 0–0.

=== Newcastle Jets ===
On 12 October 2021, after stint's with Brisbane Roar and Chainat Hornbill Babalj returned to Australia and signed with Newcastle Jets for the 2021-22 A-League Men season after a successful trial at the club.

== International career ==
He has represented Australia at U-20 level during the 2010 AFC U-19 Championship qualification for the 2010 AFC U-19 Championship. He played in 4 qualification games, scoring 3 goals, against Singapore, and two against Chinese Taipei. Babalj also represented Australia at the AFF U-19 Youth Championship. He scored against Vietnam and the winning goal in the final of the AFF U-19 Youth Championship against Thailand. He made his debut for Australia's senior team on 14 November 2012 in a friendly against South Korea. Babalj was selected in the Socceroos squad for the East Asian Cup qualification round. He started his first game for Australia against Guam in a 9–0 win, scoring a double before being substituted.

== Career statistics ==
=== Club ===
As of 12 May 2022

Club	Season	League			Cup		Continental		Total	
Club	Season	Division	Apps	Goals	Apps	Goals	Apps	Goals	Apps	Goals
Melbourne Heart	2010–11	A-League	13	2	0	0	0	0	13	2
Melbourne Heart	2011–12	A-League	22	9	0	0	0	0	22	9
Melbourne Heart	Melbourne Heart total		35	11	0	0	0	0	35	11
Red Star Belgrade	2012–13	SuperLiga	6	1	1	0	1	0	8	1
Melbourne Heart	2012–13	A-League	9	1	0	0	0	0	9	1
AZ Alkmaar	2013–14	Eredivisie	0	0	0	0	0	0	0	0
AZ Alkmaar	2014–15	Eredivisie	0	0	0	0	0	0	0	0
PEC Zwolle (loan)	2014–15	Eredivisie	4	0	0	0	0	0	4	0
Adelaide United (loan)	2015–16	A-League	5	0	3	1	0	0	8	1
Adelaide United	2016–17	A-League	4	0	0	0	4	1	8	1
Adelaide United	Adelaide total		9	0	3	1	4	1	16	2
Mladá Boleslav	2017–18	Czech First League	2	0	1	0	0	0	3	0
ATK	2018–19	Indian Super League	3	0	0	0	0	0	3	0
Brisbane Roar	2018–19	A-League	4	0	0	0	0	0	4	0
Chainat Hornbill	2019	Thai League 1	7	1	1	0	0	0	8	1
Newcastle Jets	2021–22	A-League Men	10	1	1	0	0	0	11	1
Career total			89	15	7	1	5	1	101	17

=== International ===
Appearances and goals by national team and year
National team	Year	Apps	Goals
Australia	2012	2	2
Total		2	2

Scores and results list Australia's goal tally first, score column indicates score after each Babalj goal.

List of international goals scored by Eli Babalj
No.	Date	Venue	Opponent	Score	Result	Competition	Ref.
1	7 December 2012	Hong Kong Stadium, Causeway Bay, Hong Kong	Guam	2–0	9–0	2013 EAFF East Asian Cup qualification	
2	7 December 2012	Hong Kong Stadium, Causeway Bay, Hong Kong	Guam	4–0	9–0	2013 EAFF East Asian Cup qualification	

== Honours ==
Adelaide United

- A-League Premiers: 2015–16
- A-League Championship: 2015–16

Australia U-20

- AFC U-20 Asian Cup: runner-up 2010
- AFF U-19 Youth Championship: 2010
