= Mate Dugandzic =

Australian soccer player (born 1989)

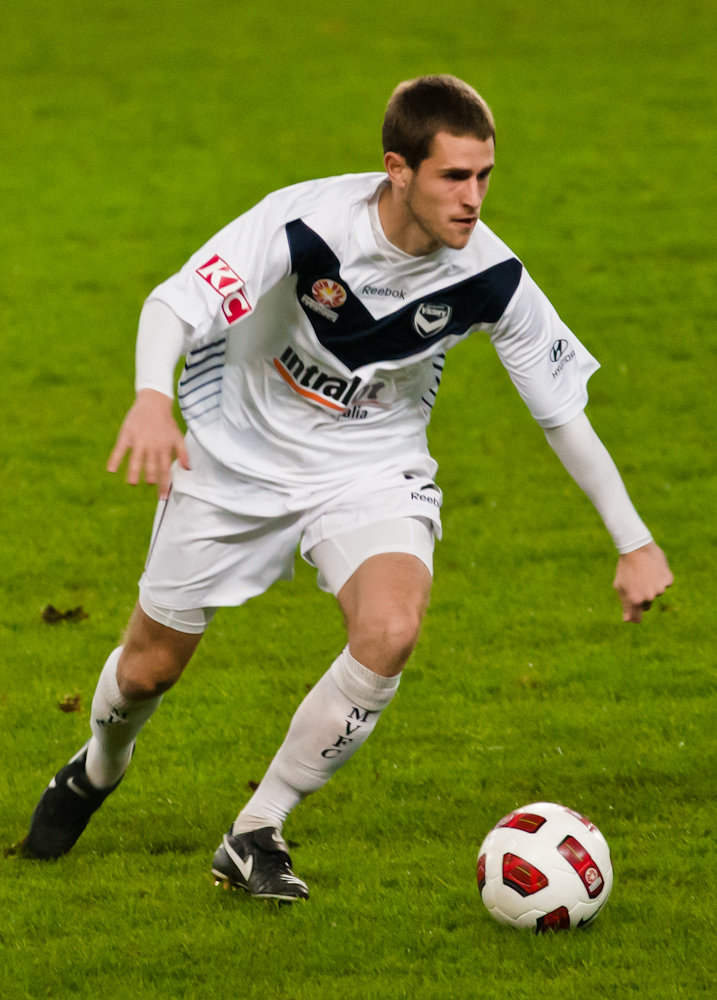
- Dugandzic playing for Melbourne Victory in 2010

Personal information
- Full name: Mate Dugandzic
- Date of birth: 22 October 1989 (age 37)
- Place of birth: Melbourne, Australia
- Height: 1.74 m (5 ft 9 in)
- Position: Winger

Youth career
- 1998–2004: St Albans Saints
- 2005: Melbourne Knights
- 2009: Melbourne Victory

Senior career*
Years	Team	Apps	(Gls)
2006–2007	Melbourne Knights	28	(6)
2008–2009	Dinamo Zagreb	0	(0)
2008	→ Lokomotiva Zagreb (loan)	14	(6)
2009	Melbourne Knights	21	(1)
2009–2011	Melbourne Victory	36	(7)
2011–2015	Melbourne City	75	(13)
2015–2016	Adelaide United	18	(1)
2017	Dandenong City	23	(7)
2019	Dandenong City	8	(0)
Total		215	(41)

International career
2010	Australia U23	3	(0)

Managerial career
- 2023–2024: Western United NPL (assistant)
- 2025–: Sydenham Park SC
- * Club domestic league appearances and goals

Mate Dugandzic (Croatian: Mate Dugandžić; born 22 October 1989) is a retired Australian football player, who is currently the head coach of Sydenham Park SC in the Victorian State League 1. Recently was an assistant coach of Western United NPL. He is known for being the first player to make a direct switch between both Melbourne clubs in the A-League when he moved from Melbourne Victory to join Melbourne Heart in 2011. He was also part of the Adelaide United squad that went on to win both the 2015–16 A-League Premiers Plate and the 2016 A-League Grand Final.

== Club career ==
=== Melbourne Knights ===
Dugandzic debuted for the Melbourne Knights as a 16-year-old in 2006. In 2007, he played an important role in helping the club secure second spot in the Victorian Premier League. After an impressing performance throughout the 2007 play-off series, where which Melbourne Knights had finished in third place, Dugandzic's performance had attracted the attention of A-League clubs, A.S. Roma, and the Australian Institute of Sport. The Croatian Football Federation also expressed their interest. Consequently, Melbourne Knights him organised a trial with Dinamo Zagreb and colleague Daniel Visevic. Dugandzic himself had stated that he would have rather signed for Dinamo Zagreb instead of AS Roma. Mate then underwent a three-week trial with the Dinamo Zagreb's first-team in December 2007.

=== Lokomotiva Zagreb ===
Despite the interest of other clubs, Dinamo Zagreb were favourites to land a deal with Dugandzic because of his Croatian background. After he had completed his trial Dugandzic was offered a five-year contract. He was considered a European player due to his Croatian citizenship. Until July 2008, Dugandzic had been a part of the reserve team of Dinamo before he was loaned out to Second Division outfit Lokomotiva. Dugandzic failed to break into the first-team at Dinamo Zagreb and therefore returned to Melbourne Knights in January for the 2009 Victorian Premier League season.

=== Melbourne Victory ===
On 10 September 2009 Dugandzic was signed to a two-year contract with Melbourne Victory. He was initially signed as a youth team player but impressed the coaching staff enough to earn a senior contract. On 26 September 2009, he made his senior debut for Victory as a substitute, in a 3–2 win against Gold Coast United. On 24 October 2009, he made his starting debut, scoring two goals, in the 18th and 56th minute, in a 3–1 win against Adelaide United. On 7 August 2010, Dugandzic started for the Melbourne Victory against rivals Sydney FC in a grand final rematch. He was very influential in this game and scored one goal, as well as an assist. On 26 January 2011, he was again impressive, scoring two goals in four minutes for Melbourne Victory in their away match win against North Queensland Fury.

=== Melbourne Heart/City ===
It was reported on 26 February 2011, that Dugandzic had agreed to terms with recently promoted Belgian Pro League side K.A.S. Eupen on a free transfer from A-League club Melbourne Victory. Manager Albert Cartier spoke of his delight in securing the potential signature of the highly rated midfielder to French language newspaper La Libre Belgique, believing that Dugandzic would help to rectify the club's problems in midfield this season. However, on 28 February 2011 it was announced that he had opted to stay in Australia and signed for cross town rival Melbourne Heart. Aziz Behich and Kristian Sarkies were the only other players to play for both Heart and Victory, but neither were direct transfers, making Dugandzic the first to properly switch between the clubs. Dugandzic said that it was the club philosophy at Heart that secured his decision to move.

Dugandzic rose to the occasion on his debut for the Heart, scoring twice in the opening round clash against Newcastle Jets in Newcastle, however the Heart lost 3–2. He scored again six weeks later, also against the Jets, and this time Heart were victorious with a 3–0 win. He also scored the only goal of the game in a 1–0 win over Wellington Phoenix three weeks after that.

On 13 May, Melbourne City released a statement announcing that Dugandzic, along with four other City players including Damien Duff, would not be receiving a contract extension following the conclusion of the team's finals campaign.

=== Adelaide United ===
On 16 August 2015, Dugandzic joined Adelaide United on a one-year deal. He left the club at the end of his contract.

== International career ==
In September 2010 Dugandzic was called up to the Australian under-23 side by coach Aurelio Vidmar for a Four Nations Tournament held in Vietnam. Dugandzic made his under 23 international debut for Australia against North Korea as a substitute on 20 September 2010. On 7 April 2011, Dugandzic was named as part of a 31-man Olyroos/Socceroos training camp.

== A-League statistics ==
As of 2 November 2014

Club	Season	League		Finals series		Cup		Continental^{1}		Total	
Club	Season	Apps	Goals	Apps	Goals	Apps	Goals	Apps	Goals	Apps	Goals
Melbourne Victory	2009–10	10	2	0	0	–	–	3	1	13	3
Melbourne Victory	2010–11	26	5	1	0	–	–	–	–	27	5
Melbourne Victory	Total	36	7	1	0	–	–	3	1	40	8
Melbourne City	2011–12	22	7	1	0	–	–	–	–	23	7
Melbourne City	2012–13	7	0	–	–	–	–	–	–	7	0
Melbourne City	2013–14	26	4	–	–	–	–	–	–	26	4
Melbourne City	2014–15	13	2	–	–	1	0	–	–	5	0
Melbourne City	Total	68	13	1	0	1	0	0	0	61	11
Career total		104	20	2	0	1	0	3	1	101	19

^{1} – AFC Champions League statistics are included in season commencing during group stages (i.e. ACL 2010 and A-League season 2009–2010 etc.)

== See also ==
- Croatian Australian

== Honours ==
Adelaide United

- A-League Premiership: 2015-16
