= Jonatan Germano =

Argentine-Australian footballer

Personal information
- Full name: Jonatan Miguel Germano
- Date of birth: 31 May 1988 (age 38)
- Place of birth: San Nicolás, Argentina
- Height: 1.70 m (5 ft 7 in)
- Positions: Midfielder; defender

Youth career
- 2005–2007: Estudiantes

Senior career*
Years	Team	Apps	(Gls)
2007–2011	Estudiantes	1	(0)
2009	→ HNK Rijeka (loan)	4	(0)
2010–2011	→ Sportivo Luqueño (loan)	14	(0)
2011–2015	Melbourne City	56	(7)
2016–2022	Avondale FC	100	(32)
2022	Preston Lions	5	(0)

Managerial career
- 2025–2026: Avondale FC
- * Club domestic league appearances and goals

Jonatan Miguel Germano (born 31 May 1988) is an Argentine-Australian football coach who recently was head coach for Avondale FC and former player with Melbourne Heart, Avondale FC and Preston Lions.

== Early life ==
Germano was born in San Nicolás. His odyssey into football began when he joined the Estudiantes youth team. He signed a professional contract in 2007.

== Career ==
=== Estudiantes (2007–2011) ===
Germano made his debut for Estudiantes on 9 September 2007 against Racing Club in the Primera División. He came on as a substitute for Juan Manuel Salgueiro in the 66th minute, Estudiantes won the match 2–1. He was released from the club after the 2010–11 season.

==== Loan to HNK Rijeka ====
In 2009 Germano wen't on a season long loan to Croatian club HNK Rijeka. He was unable to cement a place in the first team. He was used sparingly, featuring just four times in the 2009–10 Prva HNL season.

==== Loan to Sportivo Luqueño ====
Germano was loaned to Primera División Paraguaya club Sportivo Luqueño for the Torneo Apertura of the 2010 season. He featured in 14 games for the club, playing in a variety of positions.

=== Melbourne Heart and Melbourne City ===
In July 2011, Germano traveled to Australia for a one-month trial with A-League club Melbourne Heart, where he 'surprised' the team with his talent. He played in two trials for the club, playing a full 90 minutes in both games. At the end of July, he returned to his homeland after impressing coaches John van't Schip, Ante Milicic and John Aloisi.

Germano was offered a contract and awaited clearance on his visa application. His signing completed Melbourne Heart's squad for the 2011–12 season. He claimed the fifth and final 'Visa spot' for the club. On 5 September 2011, he officially signed with Melbourne Heart and was given the number 13.

On 18 November 2011, Germano scored his first official goal which sealed the win for the game. It was his sixth appearance for the club. After heading in his second goal for the club, the opener in a 2–1 victory over the Brisbane Roar, Germano celebrated by pulling a Santa Claus hat from his shorts whilst celebrating in front of Roar fans. Later, referee Kris Griffiths-Jones booked Germano for the celebration.

As of October 2014, Germano, along with his manager John van't Schip were the only members of Melbourne City who spoke Spanish. On 28 March 2015 Germano scored the winner against Brisbane Roar in the 4th minute all but ending Brisbane's title defence making it almost impossible for them to make the finals.

Germano was released by Melbourne City at the end of the 2014–15 A-League season.

=== Avondale FC ===
In late 2015, it was confirmed that Germano, along with former Melbourne Victory player Spase Dilevski, would be joining National Premier Leagues Victoria side Avondale for the 2016 NPL Victoria season. Germano said after leaving Melbourne City, he wanted another chance to play in the A-League but no clubs came, leading him to join Avondale FC.

Germano had to sit out the first few rounds of the NPL season, waiting for his Australian Visa to come through. He made his debut in a 3–1 loss at Knights Stadium against reigning champions Bentleigh Greens on 11 March 2016. He then scored his first goal for the club, the fifth in a 5–1 win over South Springvale in Round 5 of the FFA Cup, after coming on as a late substitute. Germano scored both of Avondale's goals in a Round 13 2–2 draw with Richmond SC on 20 May 2016, hitting home a 92nd-minute goal to give his side a point from the game.

Germano became an Australian citizen as of 2017. He won the Dockerty cup in 2021 with Avondale Heights.

== Honours ==
=== Players ===
Avondale FC

- Dockerty Cup: 2021
- NPL Victoria: runner-up 2018

=== Managers ===
Avondale FC

- NPL Victoria: Champions 2026
