= 2011 Victorian Premier League =

Victorian Premier League
- Season: 2011
- Teams: 12 (+1)
- Champions: Green Gully
- Premiers: Green Gully
- Relegated: Springvale White Eagles; St Albans Saints

The 2011 Victorian Premier League (known as the Alanic Premier League for sponsorship reasons) was the ninety-ninth season of the Victorian Premier League since the first season in 1909. The home and away season began 15 February 2011 and concluded 7 August 2011. Green Gully were the defending champions.

The concept of a youth development squad was reintroduced in 2010 with the National Training Centre team playing in midweek fixtures throughout the season but not for competition points. In 2011 the team, mostly comprising players from the Melbourne Victory youth squad, was renamed Victorian Training Centre Football and was eligible to score competition points for its matches but ineligible to qualify for the finals series or be relegated.

Green Gully won the double, winning both the premiership and the Grand Final, defeating Oakleigh Cannons. Green Gully surpassed South Melbourne FC and Brunswick Juventus as the club with the most Victorian championships with nine in total.

== Teams ==
- Bentleigh Greens
- Dandenong Thunder SC
- Green Gully
- Heidelberg United
- Hume City FC
- Melbourne Knights
- Northcote City
- Oakleigh Cannons
- Richmond SC
- South Melbourne FC
- Springvale White Eagles
- St Albans Saints
- VTC Football

== Promotion and relegation ==
Teams promoted from Victorian State League Division 1:
(After the end of the 2010 season.)

- St Albans Saints (champions)
- Springvale White Eagles (runners-up)

Teams relegated to Victorian State League Division 1:
(After the end of the 2010 season.)

- Altona Magic (11th)
- Sunshine George Cross (12th)

== Regular season ==
The Victorian Premier League 2011 season was played over 22 rounds, concluding on 7 August 2011, followed by the final series.

Pos	Team	Pld	W	D	L	GF	GA	GD	Pts	Qualification or relegation
1	Green Gully (C)	24	13	4	7	51	23	+28	43	VPL 2011 Victorian Premier League Finals
2	Oakleigh Cannons	24	13	4	7	41	29	+12	43	VPL 2011 Victorian Premier League Finals
3	Hume City	24	12	6	6	48	32	+16	42	VPL 2011 Victorian Premier League Finals
4	South Melbourne	24	12	5	7	39	33	+6	41	VPL 2011 Victorian Premier League Finals
5	Heidelberg United	24	12	7	5	53	26	+27	40 (Note: Heidelberg Utd was given a 3-point deduction arising from their Round 3 match against Hume City.)	VPL 2011 Victorian Premier League Finals
6	Northcote City	24	11	6	7	61	37	+24	39	
7	Richmond	24	11	4	9	34	38	−4	37	
8	Bentleigh Greens	24	10	6	8	34	34	0	36	
9	Dandenong Thunder	24	12	5	7	43	29	+14	35 (Note: South Melbourne lost 6 points as a result their Round 9 fixture against Bentleigh Greens.)	
10	Melbourne Knights	24	8	7	9	39	33	+6	31	
11	Springvale White Eagles	24	3	6	15	24	62	−38	15	Relegation to Victorian State League Division 1
12	St Albans Saints	24	3	4	17	27	58	−31	13	Relegation to Victorian State League Division 1
13	VTC Football	24	4	0	20	25	85	−60	12	

Rules for classification: 1) points; 2) goal difference; 3) number of goals scored.
(C) Champions

== Finals ==
Qualifying Finals
2	Oakleigh Cannons	3
3	Hume City FC	4
4	South Melbourne FC	1
5	Heidelberg United	0

Semi Final
1	Green Gully Cavaliers	3
Hume City FC	0
Oakleigh Cannons	1
South Melbourne FC	0

Preliminary Final
Hume City FC	0 (3)
Oakleigh Cannons	0 (4)

Grand Final
Green Gully Cavaliers	3
Oakleigh Cannons	2

=== Finals Week 1 ===
14 Aug 2011 Elimination Final	South Melbourne FC	1–0	Heidelberg United	SS Anderson Reserve, Port Melbourne
3:00PM	Krnčević 66' (pen.); Petrovic (yellow card) 39' (red card)	Report	Armenian (yellow card) 16'

14 Aug 2011 Qualifying Final	Oakleigh Cannons	3–4	Hume City FC	Jack Edwards Reserve, Oakleigh
6:45PM	Diaco 34' (?); Lagana 40'	Report	Cardozo 47'; Own goal 52'; Ofli 88', 89'; Vlahos (yellow card)	Referee: Shaun Evans

=== Finals Week 2 ===
20 Aug 2011 Major Semi Final	Green Gully Cavaliers	3–0	Hume City FC	Green Gully Reserve, Keilor Downs
3:00PM	Nikolić 10'; Međedević 80'; Sanders 92'; Roganovic (yellow card)	Report	Vlahos (yellow card)

21 Aug 2011 Minor Semi Final	Oakleigh Cannons	1–0	South Melbourne FC	Jack Edwards Reserve, Oakleigh
6:00PM	Goodwin 89'; Tavsancioglu (yellow card); Robinson (yellow card); Lagana (yellow card)	Report	Vasilevski (yellow card)

=== Finals Week 3 ===
27 Aug 2011 Preliminary Final	Hume City FC	0–0 (a.e.t.) (2–4 p)	Oakleigh Cannons	SS Anderson Reserve, Port Melbourne
7:00PM	Riccobene (yellow card); Bozinovski (yellow card) 35'; Cardozo (yellow card) 107'; Gurkan (yellow card)	Report	Drakos (yellow card) 45'; Groenewald (yellow card) 51'
	Penalties
	Cardozo (penalty scored); Pace (penalty missed); Nakic (penalty missed); Bozinovski (penalty scored)		(penalty scored) Diaco; (penalty scored) Tavsancioglu; (penalty scored) Robinson; (penalty scored) Goodwin

=== Grand Final ===
3 Sep 2011
4:00 PM

Green Gully Cavaliers	3–2 (a.e.t.)	Oakleigh Cannons
Fleming 23'; Basma 52', 95'	Report	Doyle 25'; Diaco 30'

AAMI Park, Melbourne

== Top goalscorers ==
Pos	Player	Club	Goals	Penalties
1	Richard Cardozzo	Hume City	19	1
2	Saso Aleksovski	Heidelberg United	16	0
3	Trent Rixon	Northcote City	15	2
4	Luke Sherbon	Dandenong Thunder	14	2
5	Jason Hayne	Green Gully	13	1
6	Osagie Ederaro	Heidelberg United	12	1
7	James Kalifatidis	Northcote City	11	0
8	Jacob Colosimo	Melbourne Knights	10	1
8	Jesse Krncevic	South Melbourne	10	0
8	Mathew J Sanders	Green Gully	10	0
9	Michael Ferrante	Richmond	8	2
9	Goran Zoric	Springvale White Eagles	8	0

== See also ==
- Victorian Premier League
- Football Federation Victoria
- National Premier Leagues Victoria
