= Bobby Russell (Australian footballer) =

Australian rules footballer

Personal information
- Full name: Robert Francis Russell
- Born: 2 July 1893; Footscray, Victoria
- Died: 9 August 1943 (aged 50); Melbourne, Victoria
- Original team: St Kilda District

Playing career^{1}
Years	Club	Games (Goals)
1919	St Kilda	1 (0)
- ^{1} Playing statistics correct to the end of 1919.

Robert Francis "Bobby" Russell (2 July 1893 – 9 August 1943) was an Australian rules footballer who played with St Kilda in the Victorian Football League (VFL).

== Death ==
He died on 9 August 1943.
