= Maycon (footballer, born 1986) =

Brazilian footballer

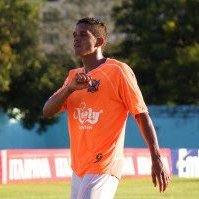
- Maycon playing for Nova Iguachu in 2011

Personal information
- Full name: Maycon Carvalho Inez
- Date of birth: 21 July 1986 (age 40)
- Place of birth: São Fidélis, Rio de Janeiro, Brazil
- Height: 1.82 m (6 ft 0 in)
- Position: Forward

Senior career*
Years	Team	Apps	(Gls)
2010	ASA de Arapiraca	1	(1)
2011	Nova Iguacu	11	(5)
2011–2012	Melbourne Heart	14	(1)
2012	Pahang FA	21	(13)
2013	Nova Iguacu	2	(1)
2014	Caldense		
2014–2015	Goyang Hi FC	3	(0)
2015–2016	Cabofriense	1	(0)
2016	ASA		
2016–2017	Macaé		
- * Club domestic league appearances and goals

Maycon Carvalho Inez (born 21 July 1986) is a Brazilian former professional footballer who played as a forward.

== Career ==
=== ASA de Arapiraca & Nova Iguacu ===
Maycon has played for ASA de Arapiraca in the Brazilian Série B and Nova Iguacu with whom he helped reach the finals of the 2011 Guanabara Trophy scoring 5 of the club's 12 goals. He also competed in the Rio Trophy where they faced eventual champions Flamengo.

=== Melbourne Heart ===
Maycon moved to Australia, signing with A-League side Melbourne Heart. He will be the second Melbourne Heart player to wear the number 9 shirt, after former striker Gerald Sibon. He scored his first goal for Heart, in the Round 4, 1–1 draw with Sydney FC. On 6 April 2012 it was announced that he would be leaving the club for Pahang FA.

=== Pahang FA ===
Maycon was recommended by former Pahang FA player, Ante Milicic, who was assistant coach of Melbourne Heart, after Pahang was searching for a striker to partner Mohd Azamuddin Md Akil. After two successful trial matches, Pahang agreed to sign him from Melbourne Heart to help them become runner-up of Malaysian Premier League and secure promotion to Malaysia Super League. However, after Pahang FA secured promotion to Malaysian Super League 2013, "The Elephants" decided against renewing his contract for the upcoming season.

== Style of play ==
He is known for his pace and ability to position himself inside the 18-yard box.
