= Spase Dilevski =

Australian soccer player (born 1985)

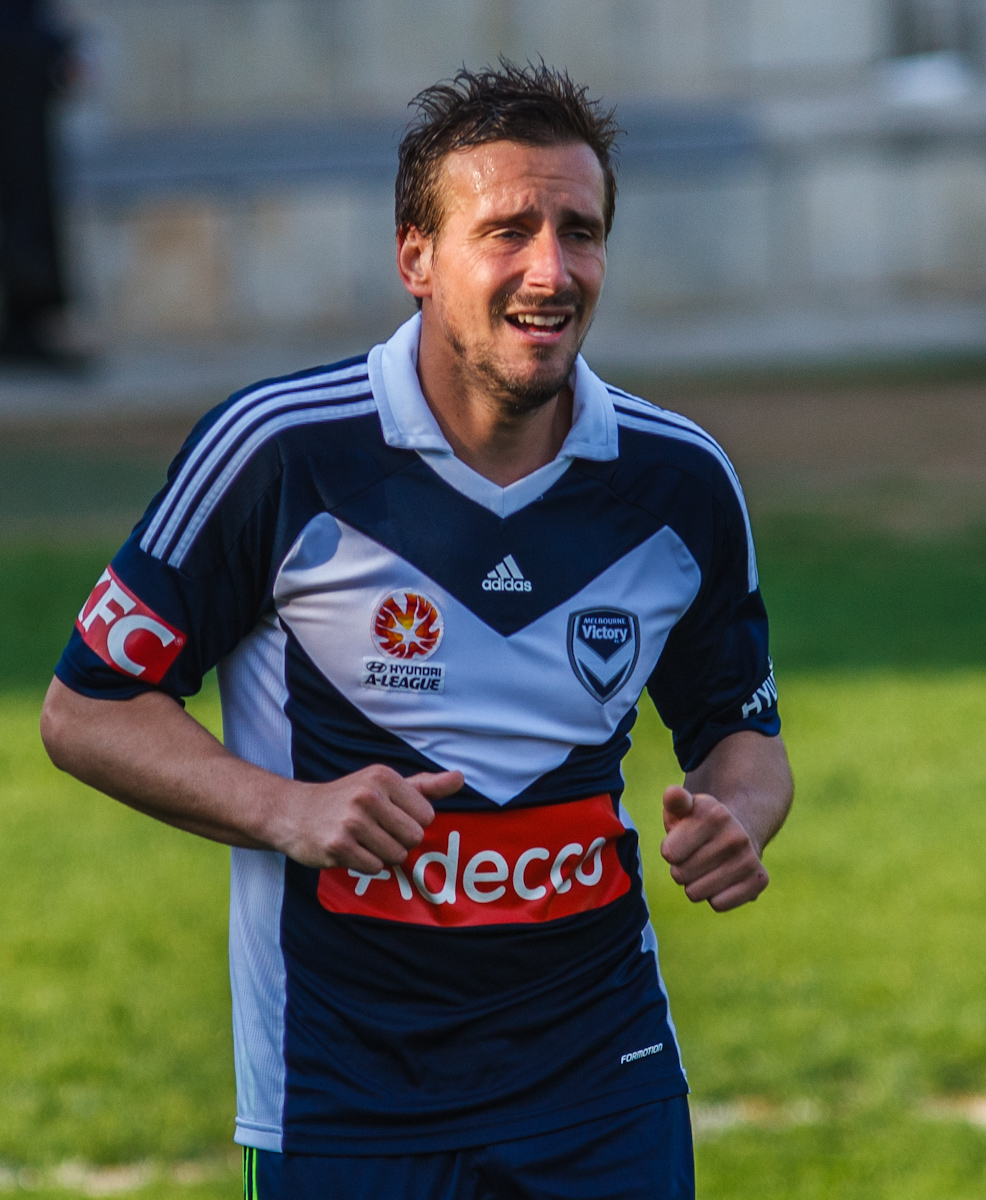
- Dilevski in 2012

Personal information
- Date of birth: 13 May 1985 (age 41)
- Place of birth: Melbourne, Australia
- Height: 1.80 m (5 ft 11 in)
- Positions: Centre-back; right-back; defensive midfielder

Youth career
- 1995–2000: Sydenham Park
- 2000–2001: VIS
- 2001–2003: PSV Eindhoven

Senior career*
Years	Team	Apps	(Gls)
2003–2004	PSV Eindhoven	0	(0)
2003–2004	→ Rot-Weiss Essen (loan)	0	(0)
2004–2005	Tottenham Hotspur	0	(0)
2005	Melbourne Victory	0	(0)
2005–2007	Queensland Roar	34	(1)
2007–2011	Universitatea Craiova	80	(0)
2011–2012	Adelaide United	12	(1)
2012–2013	Melbourne Victory	14	(1)
2014–2015	ATM FA	12	(0)
2016	Avondale FC	4	(0)
2017–2018	Campbelltown City	19	(0)
Total		175	(3)

International career
2001	Australia U17	9	(0)
2002–2005	Australia U20	18	(2)
2004–2008	Australia U23	20	(1)
- * Club domestic league appearances and goals

Spase Dilevski (Macedonian: Спасе Дилевски; born 13 May 1985) is an Australian former professional soccer player who played as a centre-back, right-back and defensive midfielder.

== Club career ==
Dilevski started his career as a junior for Victorian lower league team Sydenham Park where he was coached by Tony Ivanov and eventually played in their seniors at a very young age. It was club policy to promote talent into the senior team that was adopted by Bill Dimovski. After showing obvious talent and out-classing others many years his senior, the Victorian Institute of Sport recruited him.

Dilevski was recruited by European clubs Tottenham Hotspur and PSV Eindhoven early in his career. After Tottenham offered him an extension on his contract, he chose to move out of England in order to get some first team experience in Australia. Dilevski joined Melbourne Victory for the duration of their participation in the 2005 Australian Club World Championship Qualifying Tournament, ultimately just the one game where they were knocked out of the tournament by Adelaide United. After a stint with Queensland Roar in Australia, he moved to Romania where he struggled for game time. In 2008, the new manager of Craiova decided to use him as a defensive midfielder, and Dilevski played well in the new position.

He returned to the A-League in March 2011 and was signed on a one-year deal with Adelaide United. Making 12 out of a possible 27 appearances for the club.

Dilevski signed for home town club Melbourne Victory on a one-year deal, It was announced on 14 June 2012.

Following his release from Melbourne Victory in mid-2013, Dilevski spent an extended period of time without a club, before signing for Armed Forces FA in the Malaysian Super League for the 2014–15 season.

In late 2015, it was confirmed that Dilevski, along with former Melbourne City player Jonatan Germano, would be joining National Premier Leagues Victoria side Avondale FC for the 2016 season.

== International career ==
He was on the Australian roster for the 2003 FIFA World Youth Championship and 2005 as well as the 2004 Athens Olympics.

After having an injury ravaged 2006–07 season, Dilevski was a member of the Olyroos Squad (under the tutelage of Rob Baan) in preparation for the 2008 Beijing Olympics, but eventually missed out on a place in the final squad for the tournament.
