= Rutger Worm =

Dutch footballer

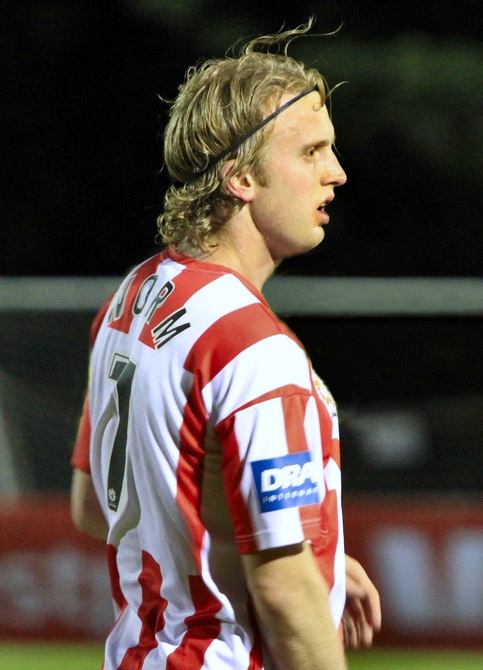
- Worm in 2010

Personal information
- Full name: Rutger Worm
- Date of birth: 1 February 1986 (age 40)
- Place of birth: Nijmegen, Netherlands
- Height: 1.80 m (5 ft 11 in)
- Position: Winger

Youth career
- –1998: Quick 1888
- 1998–2000: Vitesse
- 2000–2004: NEC

Senior career*
Years	Team	Apps	(Gls)
2004–2010	NEC	106	(5)
2010–2012	Melbourne Heart	46	(2)
2012–2013	Emmen	13	(0)
2013	Chiangrai United	4	(0)
2014–2015	Achilles '29	29	(3)
2015–2018	DFS		
2018–2019	RKHVV		

International career
2004–2005	Netherlands U19	6	(2)
2005–2007	Netherlands U21	8	(1)
- * Club domestic league appearances and goals

Rutger Worm (born 1 February 1986) is a Dutch former professional footballer who played as a winger.

== Playing career ==
=== NEC ===
Worm started his career in the youth program, Quick 1888, in Nijmegen. He subsequently moved to the Vitesse Arnhem youth squad in Arnhem for two years before ending up at the NEC football academy in 2000. He was often used as a substitute during his career at NEC where he also appeared in several European Cup matches under coach Mario Been.

=== Melbourne Heart ===
On 25 February 2010, Worm signed a multi-year deal with Melbourne Heart becoming their first ever international signing. He scored two goals for Heart in their first season, including the first ever scored by a Heart player, as the club's first official goal was an own goal by Ben Kantarovski. On 6 April 2012, it was announced that he would be leaving the club.

=== Later career ===
In the 2012–13 season, Worm played for Dutch Eerste Divisie club Emmen. In July 2013, he signed with Chiangrai United in Thailand until the end of that year.

In April 2014, Worm started practising with Achilles '29. On 3 July 2014, it was announced that he would play for the Groesbeek-based club in the 2014–15 season. Due to an injury, he missed the first two games of the season and was injured again two weeks later. Worm suffered another injury against RKC Waalwijk on 29 September. On 25 October 2014, he scored his first goal for Achilles, in the away match against MVV (3–2). On 27 February 2015, he scored the 1–0 against VVV-Venlo (1–1) with a header, who as a result missed out on the period title. Three weeks later he scored the equaliser with a volley (1–1) in the match against Almere City, which was eventually won 3–1. From the 2015–16 season, Worm played for amateur club DFS. In 2018, he moved to RKHVV where he announced his retirement in mid-2019.

== Coaching career ==
In the 2019–20 season, Worm was assistant to head coach Arno Arts at DFS. In June 2020, he was appointed assistant at DOVO to head coach Scott Calderwood.
