= 2010–11 Melbourne Heart FC season =

Melbourne Heart
2010–11 season
- Chairman: Peter Sidwell
- Manager: John van't Schip
- Stadium: AAMI Park
- A-League: 8th
- Top goalscorer: John Aloisi (8)
- Highest home attendance: 25,897 vs. Melbourne Victory (4 October 2010)
- Lowest home attendance: 2,754 vs. Newcastle Jets (8 December 2010)
- Average home league attendance: 8,315
- Biggest win: 2–0 vs. Newcastle Jets (A) (31 October 2010); 2–0 vs. North Queensland Fury (H) (2 January 2011)
- Biggest defeat: 0–4 vs. Brisbane Roar (A) (25 September 2010)
Home colours	Away colours

The 2010–11 season was the inaugural season in the history of Melbourne Heart FC since its establishment in 2009. The team played in the A-League for the first time with all of their home matches being played at AAMI Park. After being placed sixth for the better part of the season, the team would go on to finish eighth on the ladder. Former Australian international John Aloisi was the Heart's top goalscorer, with eight goals, in his final season in professional football.

== First-team squad ==
Note: Flags indicate national team as defined under FIFA eligibility rules; some limited exceptions apply. Players may hold more than one non-FIFA nationality.

No.	Pos.	Nation	Player
1	GK	AUS	Clint Bolton
2	DF	AUS	Michael Marrone
3	DF	AUS	Brendan Hamill
4	DF	AUS	Simon Colosimo
5	DF	AUS	Michael Beauchamp
6	MF	AUS	Matt Thompson
7	MF	NED	Rutger Worm
8	MF	AUS	Kristian Sarkies
9	FW	NED	Gerald Sibon
10	MF	AUS	Wayne Srhoj
11	FW	BRA	Alex Terra
12	GK	AUS	Peter Zoïs

No.	Pos.	Nation	Player
14	MF	AUS	Kamal Ibrahim
15	FW	AUS	John Aloisi
16	DF	AUS	Aziz Behich
17	DF	AUS	Jason Hoffman
18	MF	AUS	Ante Tomić
19	FW	AUS	Eli Babalj
20	MF	AUS	Josip Skoko
21	FW	AUS	Kliment Taseski
22	MF	AUS	Nick Kalmar
23	DF	AUS	Dean Heffernan
25	MF	AUS	Adrian Zahra

== Transfers ==
=== Transfers in ===
Date	Pos.	Name	From	Notes
19 November 2009	DF	(Australia) Matt Thompson	(Australia) Newcastle Jets	Free
24 November 2009	MF	(Australia) Kristian Sarkies	(Australia) Adelaide United	Free
24 November 2009	DF	(Australia) Dean Heffernan	(Australia) Central Coast Mariners	Free
26 December 2009	FW	(Australia) Eli Babalj	(Australia) AIS	Free
26 December 2009	MF	(Australia) Kamal Ibrahim	(Australia) AIS	Free
8 January 2010	FW	(Australia) Jason Hoffman	(Australia) Newcastle Jets	Free
16 February 2010	GK	(Australia) Clint Bolton	(Australia) Sydney FC	Free
23 February 2010	FW	(Netherlands) Rutger Worm	(Netherlands) N.E.C.	Free
6 March 2010	MF	(Australia) Wayne Srhoj	(Australia) Perth Glory	Free
19 March 2010	DF	(Australia) Simon Colosimo	(Australia) Sydney FC	Free
29 March 2010	FW	(Australia) John Aloisi	(Australia) Sydney FC	Free
31 March 2010	MF	(Australia) Kliment Taseski	(Australia) Melbourne Victory Youth	Free
23 April 2010	MF	(Australia) Brendan Hamill	(Australia) AIS	Free
30 April 2010	MF	(Australia) Michael Marrone	(Australia) Adelaide United	Free
10 May 2010	FW	(Brazil) Alex Terra	(Brazil) Rio Branco	Free
17 May 2010	DF	(Australia) Michael Beauchamp	(United Arab Emirates) Al-Jazira Club	Free
18 May 2010	MF	(Australia) Josip Skoko	(Croatia) Hajduk Split	Free
21 May 2010	FW	(Netherlands) Gerald Sibon	(Netherlands) Heerenveen	Free
22 May 2010	DF	(Australia) Dean Heffernan	(England) Huddersfield Town	Return from Loan
29 June 2010	MF	(Australia) Nick Kalmar	(Australia) Oakleigh Cannons	Free
26 July 2010	MF	(Australia) Ante Tomić	(Australia) Sydney United	Free
4 August 2010	GK	(Australia) Peter Zoïs	(Australia) South Melbourne	Free
25 October 2010	MF	(Australia) Aziz Behich	(Australia) Hume City	Free

=== Transfers out ===
Date	Pos.	Name	To	Fee
26 January 2010	DF	(Australia) Dean Heffernan	(England) Huddersfield Town	Free

=== Injury replacements ===
Injured player	Injury replacement	Injury	Replacement deal length	Fee
(Australia) Kristian Sarkies	(Australia) Aziz Behich	Broken fibula and tibia in right leg	Seven weeks*	Loan from Hume City
(Australia) Kristian Sarkies	(Australia) Adrian Zahra	Broken fibula and tibia in right leg	Four weeks	Loan from Melbourne Knights
(Australia) Eli Babalj	(Australia) Adrian Zahra	Hip and thigh problems	Unknown length*	Loan From Melbourne Knights

*Note: Both Behich and Zahra signed long-term deals at the completion of their replacement deal period.

== Pre-season and friendlies ==
28 April 2010	Whittlesea Zebras	1–5	Melbourne Heart	Melbourne
19:00 UTC+10	Kalambokis (?)	Report	Watson (?); Sung-Kil (?); Groenewald (?); (unknown) (?)	Stadium: Epping Stadium

17 June 2010	Wimmera South Coast Eagles	1–3	Melbourne Heart	Geelong
19:00 UTC+10	Greechan 84'	Report	Hoffman 45'; (unknown) (?); Babalj 89'	Stadium: Elcho Park

25 June 2010	Brisbane Roar	2–0	Melbourne Heart	Toowoomba
19:15 UTC+10	Nichols 19'; McKay 35'	Report		Stadium: Clive Berghofer Stadium; Attendance: 2,893

2 July 2010	Oakleigh Cannons	2–5	Melbourne Heart	Melbourne
20:30 UTC+10	Palinic 28'; Gasparinatos 87'	Report	Sibon 8', 55', 59'; Babalj 83'; Behich 85'	Stadium: Jack Edwards Reserve

8 July 2010	Melbourne Heart	1–2	Newcastle Jets	Morwell
19:30 UTC+10	Sibon 68'	Report	Bridges 6'; Abbas 27'	Stadium: LaTrobe City Stadium, Attendance: 3,000

14 July 2010	Everton (England)	2–0	(Australia) Melbourne Heart	Melbourne
19:30 UTC+10	Rodwell 34'; Saha 60'			Stadium: Etihad Stadium; Attendance: 19,261

22 July 2010	Loddon Mallee Lightning	1–9	Melbourne Heart	Bendigo
16:00 UTC+10	Hargreaves (?)		Behich 23' (?); Alex Terra 27', 55', 57'; Hoffman (?); Tolli 17'	Stadium: Epsom Huntly Recreation Reserve

July 2010	Melbourne Heart	3–0	Richmond	Melbourne
				Stadium: Olympic Park; Attendance: 0 (behind closed doors due to COVID-19 pandemic in Australia)

2 January 2011	Melbourne Heart	6–1	South Melbourne	Melbourne
				Stadium: La Trobe University

== Competitions ==
=== A-League ===
==== League table ====
Pos	Team	Pld	W	D	L	GF	GA	GD	Pts	Qualification
1	Brisbane Roar (C)	30	18	11	1	58	26	+32	65	Qualification for 2012 AFC Champions League group stage and Finals series (Note: First place qualifies for the 2012 AFC Champions League group stage. Winning the 2011 A-League Grand Final automatically earns qualification for the 2012 AFC Champions League group stage, unless first place are champions. Second place qualifies for the 2012 AFC Champions League qualifying play-off, unless they qualify for the 2011 A-League Grand Final alongside first place or become A-League Champions, subsequently third place then qualify for the 2012 AFC Champions League qualifying play-off.)
2	Central Coast Mariners	30	16	9	5	50	31	+19	57	Qualification for 2012 AFC Champions League group stage and Finals series
3	Adelaide United	30	15	5	10	51	36	+15	50	Qualification for 2012 AFC Champions League qualifying play-off and Finals series
4	Gold Coast United	30	12	10	8	40	32	+8	46	Qualification for Finals series
5	Melbourne Victory	30	11	10	9	45	39	+6	43	Qualification for Finals series
6	Wellington Phoenix	30	12	5	13	39	41	−2	41	Qualification for Finals series
7	Newcastle Jets	30	9	8	13	29	33	−4	35	
8	Melbourne Heart	30	8	11	11	32	42	−10	35	
9	Sydney FC	30	8	10	12	35	40	−5	34	
10	Perth Glory	30	5	8	17	27	54	−27	23	
11	North Queensland Fury	30	4	7	19	28	60	−32	19	

Source: ultimatealeague.com
Rules for classification: 1) points; 2) goal difference; 3) number of goals scored.
(C) Champions

==== Results summary ====
Overall								Home						Away					
Pld	W	D	L	GF	GA	GD	Pts	W	D	L	GF	GA	GD	W	D	L	GF	GA	GD
30	8	11	11	32	42	−10	35	4	6	5	15	18	−3	4	5	6	17	24	−7

Last updated: 12 January 2024.
Source: Ultimate A-League

==== Results by matchday ====
Matchday	1	2	3	4	5	6	7	8	9	10	11	27	13	14	15	16	17	18	19	20	21	22	23	24	25	26	12	28	29	30
Ground	H	A	A	H	H	A	H	A	H	A	H	A	H	A	A	A	H	H	A	H	H	A	A	H	A	H	A	A	H	H
Result	L	D	L	D	W	L	W	L	W	D	D	W	D	W	L	L	L	D	L	L	L	W	W	W	D	D	D	L	D	D
Position	11	10	11	10	6	9	8	8	8	7	6	6																		
Points	0	1	1	2	5	5	8	8	11	12	13	17																		

Updated to match(es) played on 12 January 2024. Source: Ultimate A-League
A = Away; H = Home; N = Neutral; W = Win; D = Draw; L = Loss

==== Matches ====
5 August 2010 1	Melbourne Heart	0–1	Central Coast Mariners	Melbourne
Thursday 19:30 EST	Heffernan (yellow card) 71'; Hamill (yellow card) 83'; Behich (yellow card) 86'	Report; Statistics	Bojić (yellow card) 1'; Wilkinson 16'; Hutchinson (yellow card) 36'; Simon (yellow card) 72'	Stadium: AAMI Park; Attendance: 11,050; Referee: Chris Beath

13 August 2010 2	Newcastle Jets	1–1	Melbourne Heart	Newcastle
Friday 20:00 EST	Abbas (yellow card) 45'; Bridges (yellow card) 50'; Brockie 60'; Kantarovski (yellow card) 66'	Report; Statistics	Kantarovski 79' (o.g.)	Stadium: EnergyAustralia Stadium; Attendance: 8,735; Referee: Ryan Shepheard

20 August 2010 3	Adelaide United	3–2	Melbourne Heart	Adelaide
Friday 19:30 CST	Leckie 2'; Fyfe (yellow card) 5'; Ramsay 52', 88'	Report; Statistics	Worm 42' (yellow card) 45+1'; Srhoj (yellow card) 65'; Babalj 74'; Hoffman (yellow card) 75'; Beauchamp (yellow card) 84'	Stadium: Hindmarsh Stadium; Attendance: 7,370; Referee: Ben Williams

29 August 2010 4	Melbourne Heart	2–2	Perth Glory	Melbourne
Sunday 17:00 EST	Sibon 5' (pen.); Kalmar 37'; Srhoj (yellow card) 52'; Thompson (yellow card) 82'; Heffernan (yellow card) 88'; Hamill (yellow card) 89'	Report; Statistics	Sekulovski (yellow card) 4'; Marrone 19' (o.g.); Fowler 90+4' (pen.)	Stadium: AAMI Park; Attendance: 5,878; Referee: Kurt Ams

4 September 2010 5	Melbourne Heart	1–0	North Queensland Fury	Melbourne
Saturday 17:15 EST	Kalmar 11'; Alex (yellow card) 41'; Srhoj (yellow card) 66'	Report; Statistics		Stadium: AAMI Park; Attendance: 4,184; Referee: Gerard Parsons

10 September 2010 6	Central Coast Mariners	1–0	Melbourne Heart	Gosford
Friday 20:00 EST	McBreen 20'; Hutchinson (yellow card) 75'; Kwasnik (yellow card) 78'	Report; Statistics	Heffernan (yellow card) 22'; Beauchamp (red card) 52'	Stadium: Bluetongue Stadium; Attendance: 6,326; Referee: Peter Green

19 September 2010 7	Melbourne Heart	2–1	Wellington Phoenix	Melbourne
Sunday 15:00 EST	Aloisi 50'; Alex 66'	Report; Statistics	Muscat (yellow card) 45+2'; T. Brown 75'	Stadium: AAMI Park; Attendance: 5,698; Referee: Peter Green

25 September 2010 8	Brisbane Roar	4–0	Melbourne Heart	Brisbane
Saturday 17:15 EST	Barbarouses 23'; Paartalu 37'; Reinaldo 48' (pen.) (yellow card) 55'; Nichols 76' (yellow card) 77'; Stefanutto (yellow card) 90'	Report; Statistics	Heffernan (yellow card) 47' (yellow-red card) 54'; Alex (yellow card) 80'; Skoko (yellow card) 81'	Stadium: Suncorp Stadium; Attendance: 6,342; Referee: Chris Boyle

8 October 2010 9	Melbourne Heart	2–1	Melbourne Victory	Melbourne
Saturday 19:30 EDT	Aloisi 10' (yellow card) 40'; Terra 56'; Behich (yellow card) 48' (yellow-red card) 74'	Report; Statistics	Leijer (yellow card) 22'; Kruse 37'; Muscat (yellow card) 43'; Brebner (yellow card) 55'; Celeski (yellow card) 65'; Ricardinho (yellow card) 68'	Stadium: AAMI Park; Attendance: 25,897; Referee: Ben Williams

17 October 2010 10	Wellington Phoenix	2–2	Melbourne Heart	Wellington
Sunday 17:00 NZDT	Greenacre 6'; Bertos 59'; Ifill (yellow card) 79'	Report; Statistics	Aloisi 14' (pen.); M. Thompson 36'; Colosimo (yellow card) 44'	Stadium: Westpac Stadium; Attendance: 5,211; Referee: Matthew Breeze

23 October 2010 11	Melbourne Heart	0–0	Gold Coast United	Melbourne
Saturday 19:00 EDT	Srhoj (yellow card) 52'; Worm (yellow card) 74'	Report; Statistics	van den Brink (yellow card) 35'; Curtis (yellow card) 88'; J. Brown (yellow card) 90'	Stadium: AAMI Park; Attendance: 6,150; Referee: Chris Beath

31 October 2010 12	Newcastle Jets	0–2	Melbourne Heart	Port Macquarie
Sunday 15:00 EDT	Miličević (yellow card) 88'	Report; Statistics	Kalmar 53'; Srhoj (yellow card) 76'; Sibon 90+4' (pen.)	Stadium: Port Macquarie Regional Stadium; Attendance: 3,114; Referee: Kris Griffiths-Jones

3 November 2010 13	Perth Glory	0–0	Melbourne Heart	Perth
Wednesday 19:00 WST	Baird (yellow card) 10'; B. Griffiths (yellow card) 38'; Todd (yellow card) 72'; Fondyke (yellow card) 77'; Fowler (yellow card) 77'	Report; Statistics	Marrone (yellow card) 67'; Worm (yellow card) 72'	Stadium: nib Stadium; Attendance: 5,745; Referee: Chris Beath

10 November 2010 14	North Queensland Fury	2–3	Melbourne Heart	Townsville
Wednesday 20:00 EST	Daal 12'; Spagnuolo (yellow card) 74'; Talay 85' (pen.)	Report; Summary	Marrone (yellow card) 24'; Srhoj (yellow card) 31'; Babalj 50', (yellow card) 90+1'; Sibon 59'; Zahra 64'; Colosimo (yellow card) 83'	Stadium: Dairy Farmers Stadium; Attendance: 2,866; Referee: Jarred Gillett

14 November 2010 15	Melbourne Heart	1–2	Brisbane Roar	Melbourne
Sunday 17:00 EDT	Sibon 11'; Skoko (yellow card) 53'; Srhoj (yellow card) 73'; M. Thompson (yellow card) 76'	Report; Statistics	Barbarouses 65'; Solórzano 88'; Broich (yellow card) 90'	Stadium: AAMI Park; Attendance: 7,034; Referee: Ryan Shepheard

19 November 2010 16	Melbourne Heart	0–2	Adelaide United	Melbourne
Friday 20:00 EDT	Worm (yellow card) 36'	Report; Statistics	Cornthwaite 5'; Bolton 73' (o.g.) van Dijk (yellow card) 87'	Stadium: AAMI Park; Attendance: 6,538; Referee: Chris Beath

24 November 2010 17	Wellington Phoenix	2–0	Melbourne Heart	Wellington
Wednesday 19:30 NZDT	Daniel (yellow card) 28'; Ifill 62', 73'; Sigmund (yellow card) 83'	Report; Statistics	M. Thompson (yellow card) 57' (yellow-red card) 70'	Stadium: Westpac Stadium; Attendance: 4,700; Referee: Jarred Gillett

27 November 2010 18	Melbourne Heart	0–0	Sydney FC	Melbourne
Saturday 20:15 EDT	Colosimo (yellow card) 17'; Behich (yellow card) 35'; Srhoj (yellow card) 38'; Marrone (yellow card) 71'; Kalmar (yellow card) 82'	Report; Statistics	Musialik (yellow card) 27'; Bridge (yellow card) 47'; Byun (yellow card) 90+2' (yellow-red card) 90+3'	Stadium: AAMI Park; Attendance: 5,128; Referee: Alan Milliner

5 December 2010 19	Gold Coast United	3–0	Melbourne Heart	Gold Coast
Sunday 16:00 EST	van den Brink 41' (yellow card) 84'; Culina 58' (pen.), 77'	Report; Statistics	Beauchamp (yellow card) 57'; Zahra (yellow card) 65'	Stadium: Skilled Park; Attendance: 1,658; Referee: Jarred Gillett

8 December 2010 20	Melbourne Heart	0–2	Newcastle Jets	Melbourne
Wednesday 19:00 EDT		Report; Statistics	Wheelhouse (red card) 8'; Jeffers 12' (yellow card) 62'; Jesic 18'; Zadkovich (yellow card) 41'	Stadium: AAMI Park; Attendance: 2,754; Referee: Peter Green

11 December 2010 21	Melbourne Heart	1–3	Melbourne Victory	Melbourne
Saturday 19:00 EDT	Sibon 17'; Kalmar (yellow card) 42'; Marrone (yellow card) 46'; Zahra (yellow card) 69'; Srhoj (yellow card) 90+2'	Report; Statistics	Kruse 12', 28'; Celeski (yellow card) 38'; Srhoj 54' (o.g.); Hernández (yellow card) 68'; Ferreira (yellow card) 90+3'	Stadium: AAMI Park; Attendance: 23,059; Referee: Chris Beath

17 December 2010 22	Adelaide United	1–2	Melbourne Heart	Adelaide
Friday 19:30 CDT	van Dijk 45+1'; Galeković (yellow card) 89'; Keenan (yellow card) 90+1'	Statistics	M. Thompson (yellow card) 27'; Hoffman (yellow card) 65'; Colosimo 89'; Aloisi 90+2'	Stadium: Hindmarsh Stadium; Attendance: 10,011; Referee: Ryan Shepheard

23 December 2010 23	Sydney FC	0–1	Melbourne Heart	Sydney
Thursday 19:00 EDT	Cazarine (yellow card) 44'	Report; Summary	Srhoj (yellow card) 1'; Zahra 86'	Stadium: Sydney Football Stadium; Attendance: 6,639; Referee: Ben Williams

2 January 2011 24	Melbourne Heart	2–0	North Queensland Fury	Melbourne
Sunday 17:00 EDT	Aloisi 58'; Sibon 83'	Report; Statistics	M. Hughes (yellow card) 90+4'	Stadium: AAMI Park; Attendance: 6,482; Referee: Peter Green

15 January 2011 25	Perth Glory	1–1	Melbourne Heart	Perth
Saturday 18:45 WST	Howarth 34'	Report; Statistics	Alex 70'	Stadium: nib Stadium; Attendance: 7,962; Referee: Gerard Parsons

19 January 2011 26	Melbourne Heart	1–1	Gold Coast United	Melbourne
Wednesday 20:00 EDT	Alex 17'; Beauchamp (yellow card) 58'	Report; Statistics	Djite 40'; Perchtold (yellow card) 43'	Stadium: AAMI Park; Attendance: 5,187; Referee: Strebre Delovski

22 January 2011 27	Melbourne Victory	2–2	Melbourne Heart	Melbourne
Saturday 19:00 EDT	Allsopp 10' (yellow card) 38'; Hernández 31' (yellow card) 89'; Ferreira (yellow card) 43'; Kemp (yellow card) 50'; Angulo (yellow card) 54'; K. Muscat (yellow card) 60' (red card) 79'; Petkovic (yellow card) 90+2'	Report; Statistics	Aloisi 45+2', 51'; Skoko (yellow card) 48'; M. Thompson (yellow card) 76'	Stadium: Etihad Stadium; Attendance: 32,231; Referee: Chris Beath

28 January 2011 28	Brisbane Roar	2–1	Melbourne Heart	Brisbane
Friday 19:30 EST	Solórzano 5' (yellow card) 90+2'; Nichols (yellow card) 45'; Meyer 62'	Report; Statistics	Sibon (yellow card) 45+1' (goal) 75'; M. Thompson (yellow card) 46'	Stadium: Suncorp Stadium; Attendance: 4,213; Referee: Matthew Breeze

4 February 2011 29	Melbourne Heart	1–1	Central Coast Mariners	Melbourne
Friday 20:00 EDT	M. Thompson 49'	Report; Statistics	McBreen 50'; McGlinchey (yellow card) 55'; Amini (yellow card) 90+3'	Stadium: AAMI Park; Attendance: 3,667; Referee: Strebre Delovski

12 February 2011 30	Melbourne Heart	2–2	Sydney FC	Melbourne
Saturday 19:00 EDT	Srhoj (yellow card) 20'; Sibon (yellow card) 29' (yellow-red card) 44'; Skoko (yellow card) 34'; Worm 41'; Aloisi 62' (yellow card) 62'	Report; Statistics	Carle 34' (pen.), 88'; McFlynn (yellow card) 45+1'	Stadium: AAMI Park; Attendance: 6,019; Referee: Ben Williams

== Statistics ==
=== Overall ===
Players with no appearances not included in the list.

No.	Nat.	Name	Pos.	Starts	Sub.	Total	Goals				
No.	Nat.	Name	Pos.	1	(Australia)	Clint Bolton	GK	30	0	30	0
2	(Australia)	Michael Marrone	DF	29	0	29	0				
3	(Australia)	Brendan Hamill	DF	5	7	12	0				
4	(Australia)	Simon Colosimo	DF	22	4	26	1				
5	(Australia)	Michael Beauchamp	DF	19	4	23	0				
6	(Australia)	Matt Thompson	MF	29	0	29	2				
7	(Netherlands)	Rutger Worm	MF	22	4	26	2				
8	(Australia)	Kristian Sarkies	MF	2	4	6	0				
9	(Netherlands)	Gerald Sibon	FW	24	3	27	7				
10	(Australia)	Wayne Srhoj	MF	25	1	26	0				
11	(Brazil)	Alex Terra	FW	14	6	20	4				
12	(Australia)	Peter Zois	GK	0	0	0	0				
14	(Australia)	Kamal Ibrahim	MF	1	2	3	0				
15	(Australia)	John Aloisi	FW	17	3	20	8				
16	(Australia)	Aziz Behich	DF	23	4	27	0				
17	(Australia)	Jason Hoffman	DF	3	9	12	0				
18	(Australia)	Ante Tomić	MF	0	0	0	0				
19	(Australia)	Eli Babalj	FW	1	12	13	2				
20	(Australia)	Josip Skoko	MF	21	1	22	0				
21	(Australia)	Kliment Taseski	FW	0	4	4	0				
22	(Australia)	Nick Kalmar	MF	17	12	29	3				
23	(Australia)	Dean Heffernan	DF	9	4	13	0				
25	(Australia)	Adrian Zahra	MF	17	2	19	2				

=== Disciplinary record ===
Players with no cards not included in the list.

Nat.	Name	Yellow card	Second yellow card	Red card	Points						
Nat.	Name	Yellow card	Second yellow card	Red card	Points	(Australia)	Wayne Srhoj	11	0	0	11
(Australia)	Matt Thompson	5	1	0	7						
(Australia)	Michael Beauchamp	3	0	1	6						
(Australia)	Dean Heffernan	3	1	0	5						
(Netherlands)	Rutger Worm	4	0	0	4						
(Australia)	Aziz Behich	2	1	0	4						
(Australia)	Michael Marrone	4	0	0	4						
(Australia)	Josip Skoko	4	0	0	4						
(Australia)	Simon Colosimo	3	0	0	3						
(Netherlands)	Gerald Sibon	1	1	0	3						
(Australia)	Brendan Hamill	2	0	0	2						
(Brazil)	Alex Terra	2	0	0	2						
(Australia)	Nick Kalmar	2	0	0	2						
(Australia)	Adrian Zahra	2	0	0	2						
(Australia)	Jason Hoffman	2	0	0	2						
(Australia)	John Aloisi	2	0	0	2						
(Australia)	Eli Babalj	1	0	0	1						
Total		53	4	1	64						

=== Goal-scorers ===
Players with no goals not included in the list.

Total	Player		Goals per Game																													
Total	Player		1	2	3	4	5	6	7	8	9	10	11	12	13	14	15	16	17	18	19	20	21	22	23	24	25	26	27	28	29	30
8	(Australia)	John Aloisi							1		1	1												1		1			2			1
7	(Netherlands)	Gerald Sibon				1								1		1	1						1			1				1		
4	(Brazil)	Alex Terra							1		1																1	1				
3	(Australia)	Nick Kalmar				1	1							1																		
2	(Australia)	Eli Babalj			1											1																
2	(Australia)	Adrian Zahra														1									1							
2	(Australia)	Matt Thompson										1																			1	
2	(Netherlands)	Rutger Worm			1																											1
1	Goal	Own goal		1																												
1	(Australia)	Simon Colosimo																						1								
30	Total		0	1	2	2	1	0	2	0	2	2	0	2	0	3	1	0	0	0	0	0	1	2	1	2	1	1	2	1	1	2

A goal was scored from a penalty kick
