= Melbourne Derby =

Melbourne Derby may refer to:

- Melbourne Derby (A-Leagues), association football (soccer) matches between A-Leagues teams Melbourne City and Melbourne Victory
- Melbourne Derby (BBL), cricket derby matches between Big Bash League teams Melbourne Renegades and Melbourne Stars
- Melbourne Derby (AIHL), ice hockey matches between the Melbourne Ice and Melbourne Mustangs in the Australian Ice Hockey League
- Melbourne Derby (WNBL), basketball matches between the Dandenong Rangers and Melbourne Boomers in the Women's National Basketball League
