= Melbourne Derby (A-Leagues) =

Soccer rivalry in Melbourne, Australia

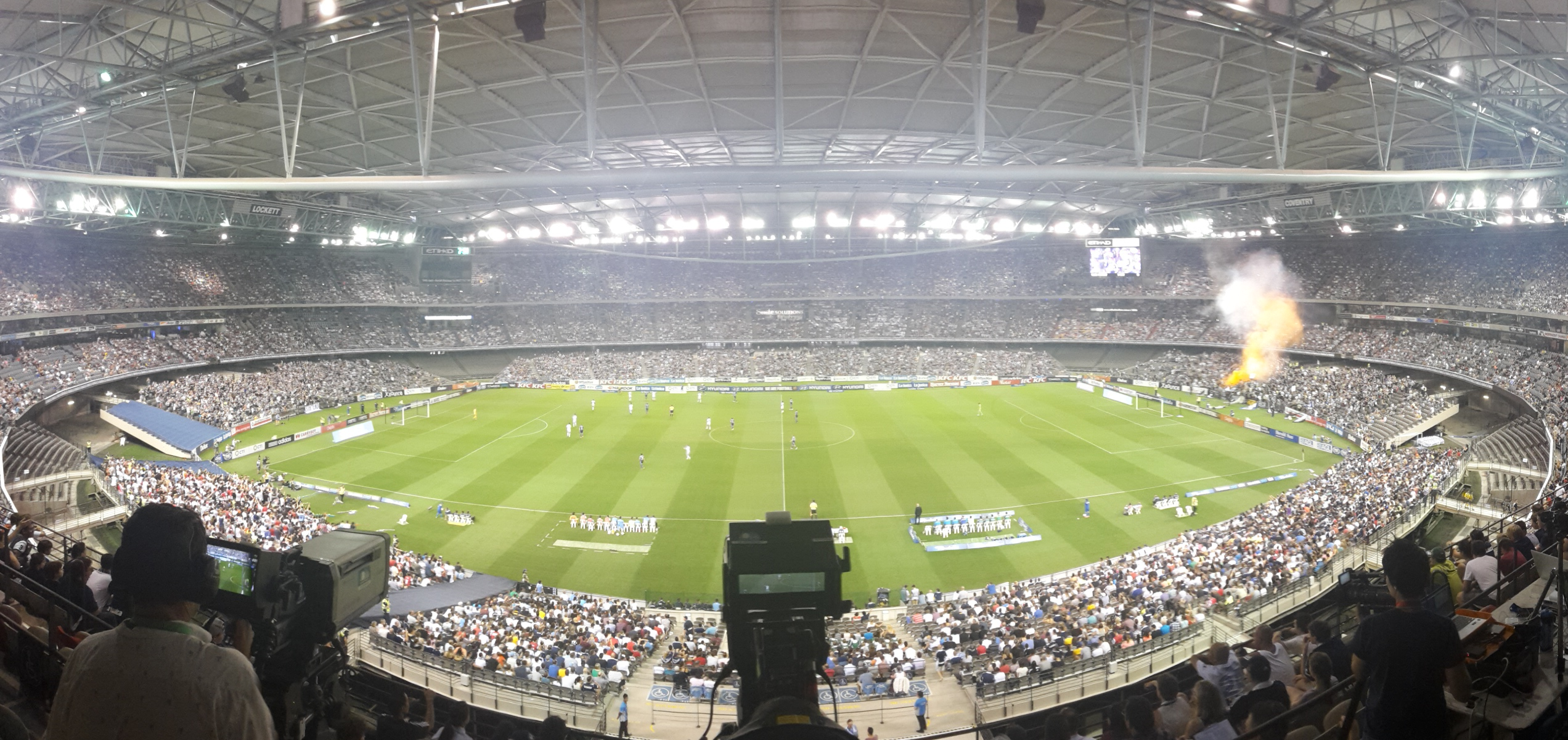
- A Melbourne Derby match at Marvel Stadium in 2015.
- Location: Melbourne
- Teams: Melbourne City; Melbourne Victory
- First meeting: 8 October 2010; A-League; City 2–1 Victory
- Latest meeting: 24 October 2026; A-League Men; Victory 1–1 City

Statistics
- Total meetings: 53
- Most wins: Victory (19)
- Top scorer: Jamie Maclaren (10)
- All-time series: Victory: 19; Drawn: 17; City: 17
- Largest victory: City 7–0 Victory (17 April 2021)
- Location of the Melbourne Rectangular Stadium (AAMI Park), the home stadium for both Melbourne City and Melbourne Victory

The Melbourne Derby is an intra-city local derby in Australia's premier association football competitions, the A-Leagues. It is contested between the first two Melbourne teams playing in the competitions, Melbourne City (formerly Melbourne Heart) and Melbourne Victory, and is the A-Leagues' first intra-city derby.

== History ==
With the introduction of Melbourne Heart (who would later be known as Melbourne City) to the A-League at the start of the 2010–11 season, joining the Victory who had joined the league at its inception in 2005, the first derby was held on 8 October 2010 at AAMI Park. The match was originally scheduled for 2 October 2010. However, due to the 2010 AFL Grand Final Replay occurring on the same day, the match was postponed.

Melbourne City won the inaugural derby 2–1, with goals from Alex Terra and John Aloisi. Robbie Kruse scored for Victory. Aziz Behich was sent off late in the second half, but Heart were able to hold on and secure the win. Although the game was an official sell out, only 25,897 fans turned up, well short of AAMI Park's official capacity of 30,050. The Victory hosted their first home derby on 22 January at Docklands Stadium, with the match ending in a 2–2 draw. The match was marred by an unacceptable tackle by Kevin Muscat on Adrian Zahra, which earned the Victory captain his second straight red card and a subsequent eight-match ban, ending not only his season, but his A-League career.

The first scoreless draw in the derby occurred in the third round of 2011–12 season, whilst a record crowd at AAMI Park was in attendance for the second derby of the season. This derby was arguably one of the best in the rivalry's brief existence, with Heart midfielder Matt Thompson scoring twice in a matter of minutes late in the first half to put Heart in the lead 2–1, before City substitute Alex Terra scored controversially after appearing to handball preceding his goal in the second half. City would win the match 3–2. The intense rivalry and passion between both sets of supporters occasionally boiled over, as occurred in February 2011 when four Melbourne City supporters were charged with "conspiracy to falsely imprison a [Victory supporter] ".

In the 2014–15 season, City underwent a takeover by the City Football Group. Melbourne City had their first derby win under the new management that season, winning the pre-Christmas derby 1–0 with Erik Paartalu scoring one of the latest winners in a derby. Victory and City later met in the Finals Series for the first time, in front of a derby record attendance of 50,873 at Etihad Stadium. Melbourne Victory won the Semi Final convincingly with a score of 3–0, with goals from Besart Berisha, Kosta Barbarouses and Archie Thompson. The third derby of the 2015–16 season was marred by a series of flares let off both outside AAMI Park before the match and inside the arena during the match by some Melbourne Victory supporters. The poor behaviour from Victory fans also extended to "an alleged assault on TV news personnel outside the stadium, throwing missiles at Melbourne City player Thomas Sørensen and a Victoria Police officer, and altercations with police after the match". Football Federation Australia subsequently issued Melbourne Victory a $50,000 club fine and a suspended three competition points deduction. On the field, the match was lauded as one of the most "captivating" derbies of the rivalry and featured an incredible passage of play for a goal from City striker Bruno Fornaroli. In Round 2 of the 2016–17 season, City recorded just their second ever derby win at Etihad Stadium, comfortably defeating Victory 4–1. The match featured the A-League Men debut of Socceroos all-time leading goal scorer Tim Cahill for City, who scored an incredible long-range goal to open City's account. The February 2017 derby was a spiteful and controversial affair. Most notably City goalkeeper Dean Bouzanis, was suspended and forced to undergo an education course after ethnically slurring Victory striker Besart Berisha during the late stages of Victory's 2–1 win. Tim Cahill was also red carded before even being entering the field of play, and Victory held on to record a stunning come from behind win.

The two rivals have been drawn for an FFA Cup derby only once; in 2016 at the semi-final stage of the tournament. Melbourne City advanced to the Final, knocking out Victory 2–0 in what was one of the most physically confrontational clashes between the two rivals. The game was not without controversy, with Melbourne City's first goal of the match allowed to stand, despite the fact that Tim Cahill had seemingly interfered with Lawrence Thomas's line of sight whilst in an offside position.

In the nine matches played from the start of the 2017–18 season to the end of the 2019–20 season, the teams shared three wins, three draws and three losses respectively, indicating a period of relative evenness between the rivals. This changed in the first two derbies of the 2020–21 season, when City claimed historic record wins in the fixture's history, defeating Victory firstly by six goals to nil in March 2021 and then by seven goals to nil the following month. Jamie Maclaren became the first player to score more than three goals in a derby in the latter game and the second player in league history to score five goals in a match, after Archie Thompson scored five goals in the 2007 A-League Grand Final. The results, which coincided with a torrid run of form for the Victory that left them in last place on the ladder, resulted in the sacking of head coach Grant Brebner on 17 April 2021.

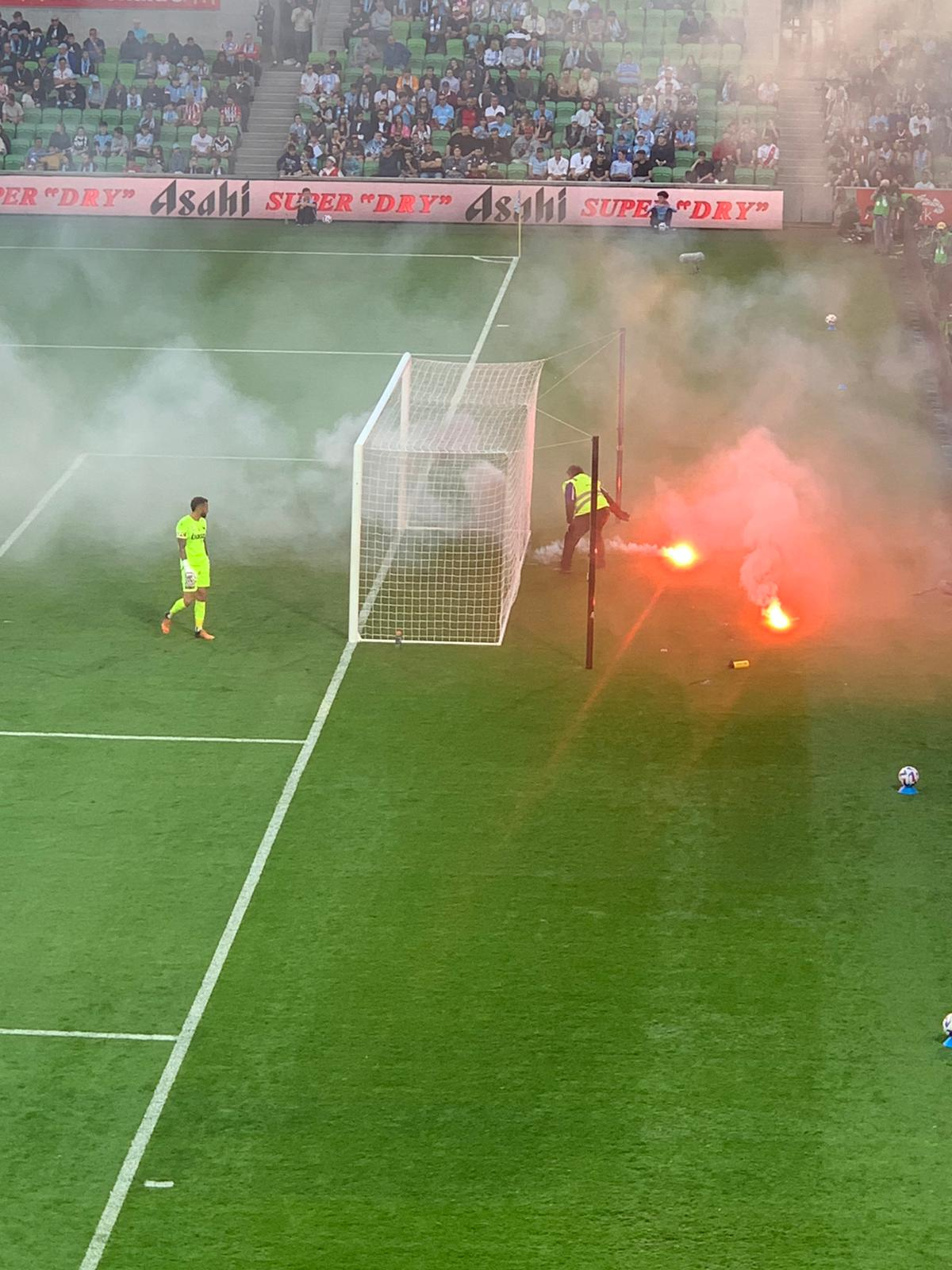
The Melbourne Derby on 17 December 2022 was marred by spectator misconduct, with multiple instances of flares being thrown on the pitch by supporters

On 12 December 2022, just a few days before the derby, the Australian Professional Leagues announced an agreement with Destination NSW that would see the 2023, 2024, and 2025 A-League Men Grand Finals hosted in Sydney, as opposed to the traditional format of being hosted by the finalist that finished higher during the regular season. This announcement was met with widespread opposition from fans, former players and active support groups, with Original Style Melbourne and Melbourne City Terrace, the active supporter groups of Melbourne Victory and Melbourne City respectively, agreeing to stage a walkout in the 20th minute of the Melbourne Derby on 17 December 2022 in order to protest against the APL's decision.

The match was marred with poor crowd behaviour, with multiple flares ignited and thrown onto the pitch by supporters of both teams. In the 20th minute of the match, Melbourne City goalkeeper Tom Glover threw back a flare sent from the crowd, sparking a pitch invasion which saw both Glover and referee Alex King assaulted by pitch invaders, and causing the match to be abandoned. In response. Football Australia sanctioned Melbourne Victory, which included a stopping of ticket sales and closure of active support for their following two matches at AAMI Park, along with bans on Victory supporters attending their following two matches outside of Melbourne. Football Australia has also contemplated forcing Melbourne Victory to play the remainder of the 2022–23 season without fans. On 10 January 2023, Football Australia found that Melbourne Victory, through the actions of their supporters in the abandoned Derby, had brought the game into disrepute, and handed down a number of financial and logistical sanctions:

- A total financial sanction of $550,000 AUD, comprising $450,000 in fines and damages and $100,000 in lost revenue from the imposition of sporting sanctions
- No organised seating for away fans for the remainder of the season and finals series.
- No organised home active support for the remainder of the season and finals series.
- A suspended 10 point deduction triggered for each instance of serious supporter misconduct for the remainder of the season and the next three seasons, ending at the conclusion of 2025/26 A-League season.

The 45th Melbourne Derby held on 5 May 2024 was the second ever Melbourne Derby finals match, the first in 9 years, as well as the first to be played at AAMI Park. Melbourne City enjoyed an early advantage in the match, taking the lead with a 29th-minute header from Samuel Souprayen, as well as gaining a one-man advantage after Zinédine Machach was sent off in the 37th minute. However, just minutes from full time, the Victory equalised through Nishan Velupillay in the 88th minute, sending the match into extra time. With neither team managing to score in extra time, the match proceeded to a penalty shootout for the first time in the fixture's history. After earlier saving a Tolgay Arslan penalty in the 19th minute, Paul Izzo made three saves in the penalty shootout in addition to scoring a penalty, helping the Victory to a 3–2 penalty shoot-out win, and ensuring that Melbourne City missed out on a place in the A-League semi-finals for the first time in five years.

The two teams met in the 2025 Grand Final, the first time any of the league's intra-city clubs had jointly qualified for the match. In a tense affair played before a record crowd at AAMI Park, City defeated Victory 1–0 to win their second championship, with the game's only goal coming from City's Israeli winger Yonatan Cohen in the 10th minute.

== A-League Men ==
=== Matches ===
==== 2010–2020 ====
Season	Derby	Comp*	Date	Home team	Score	Away team	Goals (home)	Goals (away)	Venue	Attendance
2010–11	1	RS	8 October 2010	Heart	2–1	Victory	Aloisi 10', Terra 56'	Kruse 35'	AAMI	25,897
2010–11	2	RS	11 December 2010	Heart	1–3	Victory	Sibon 17'	Kruse 12', 28', Srhoj 54' (o.g.)	AAMI	23,059
2010–11	3	RS	22 January 2011	Victory	2–2	Heart	Allsopp 11', Hernández 30'	Aloisi 45+2', 51'	Etihad	32,231
2011–12	4	RS	22 October 2011	Victory	0–0	Heart	—	—	Etihad	39,309
2011–12	5	RS	23 December 2011	Heart	3–2	Victory	Thompson 37', 39', Terra 62'	Thompson 21', Hernández 90+2'	AAMI	26,579
2011–12	6	RS	4 February 2012	Heart	0–0	Victory	—	—	AAMI	26,396
2012–13	7	RS	5 October 2012	Victory	1–2	Heart	Rojas 24'	Williams 14', Macallister 45+2'	Etihad	42,032
2012–13	8	RS	22 December 2012	Heart	1–2	Victory	Fred 81'	Rojas 67', Thompson 90+2'	AAMI	26,457
2012–13	9	RS	2 February 2013	Victory	2–1	Heart	Thompson 29', Milligan 55'	Williams 72'	Etihad	41,203
2013–14	10	RS	12 October 2013	Victory	0–0	Heart	—	—	Etihad	45,202
2013–14	11	RS	21 December 2013	Heart	1–3	Victory	Kalmar 80'	Nichols 28', 63', Troisi 60'	AAMI	26,491
2013–14	12	RS	1 March 2014	Heart	4–0	Victory	Engelaar 8', Dugandzic 15' Williams 83' Kewell 86'	—	AAMI	25,546
2014–15	13	RS	25 October 2014	Victory	5–2	City	Thompson 23', 87', Berisha 45+1', 46', 67'	Wielaert 13', Hoffman 26'	Etihad	43,729
2014–15	14	RS	20 December 2014	City	1–0	Victory	Paartalu 90'	—	AAMI	26,372
2014–15	15	RS	7 February 2015	Victory	3–0	City	Berisha 10', Barbarouses 53', Ben Khalfallah 62'	—	Etihad	40,042
2014–15	16	FS	8 May 2015	Victory	3–0	City	Berisha 18', Barbarouses 30', Thompson 87'	—	Etihad	50,873
2015–16	17	RS	17 October 2015	Victory	3–2	City	Ben Khalfallah 23', Barbarouses 57', Berisha 90'	Fornaroli 68', Mauk 71'	Etihad	40,217
2015–16	18	RS	19 December 2015	City	2–1	Victory	Mauk 20', Retre 30'	Berisha 45'	AAMI	23,572
2015–16	19	RS	13 February 2016	City	2–2	Victory	Fornaroli 22', 31'	Ben Khalfallah 29', Finkler 47'	AAMI	25,738
2016–17	20	RS	15 October 2016	Victory	1–4	City	Rojas 62'	Cahill 27', Fornaroli 31', Brattan 52', Brandán 63'	Etihad	43,188
2016–17	21	CUP	25 October 2016	Victory	0–2	City	—	Brattan 9', Brandán 77'	AAMI	15,791
2016–17	22	RS	17 December 2016	City	1–2	Victory	Cahill 16'	Rojas 24' Berisha 78'	AAMI	24,706
2016–17	23	RS	4 February 2017	Victory	2–1	City	Berisha 84', Muscat 86' (o.g.)	Baró 70' (o.g.)	Etihad	35,426
2017–18	24	RS	14 October 2017	Victory	1–2	City	George 55'	Budzinski 45+3', Kamau 64'	Etihad	35,792
2017–18	25	RS	23 December 2017	City	0–1	Victory	—	Milligan 90+5' (pen.)	AAMI	22,515
2017–18	26	RS	2 March 2018	City	1–2	Victory	Fornaroli 54' (pen.)	Barbarouses 12', George 62'	AAMI	20,083
2018–19	27	RS	20 October 2018	Victory	1–2	City	Honda 28'	De Laet 40', McGree 70'	Marvel	40,505
2018–19	28	RS	22 December 2018	City	1–1	Victory	Vidošić 90+2'	Toivonen 55'	AAMI	24,306
2018–19	29	RS	23 February 2019	Victory	1–1	City	Barbarouses 50'	Maclaren 16' (pen.)	Marvel	32,431
2019–20	30	RS	12 October 2019	Victory	0–0	City	—	—	Marvel	33,523
2019–20	31	RS	21 December 2019	City	1–2	Victory	Delbridge 56'	Toivonen 15', 41'	AAMI	17,083
2019–20	32	RS	7 February 2020	City	2–1	Victory	Berenguer 8', Maclaren 71'	Toivonen 78'	AAMI	16,872
_{* RS: A-League regular season, FS: A-League finals series, GF: A-League grand final, CUP: FFA Cup, AAMI: Melbourne Rectangular Stadium, Etihad/Marvel: Docklands Stadium; Melbourne City were known as Melbourne Heart from 2010 until 2014}

==== 2021–present ====
Season	Derby	Comp*	Date	Home team	Score	Away team	Goals (home)	Goals (away)	Venue	Attendance
2020–21	33	RS	6 March 2021	Victory	**0–6**	City	—	Maclaren 34', Berenguer 52', Griffiths 56', Metcalfe 74', 77', Colakovski 90+3'	Marvel	11,467 (Note: Capacity of the stadium was reduced by 50% due to the COVID-19 pandemic.)
2020–21	34	RS	17 April 2021	City	**7–0**	Victory	Nabbout 11', Maclaren 34' (pen.), 64', 75' (pen.), 84', 85', Luna 87'	—	AAMI	14,031 (Note: Capacity of the stadium was reduced by 25% due to the COVID-19 pandemic.)
2020–21	35	RS	6 June 2021	Victory	**1–1**	City	Brooks 90+5'	Ansell 54' (o.g.)	AAMI	0 (BCD)
2021–22	36	RS	18 December 2021	City	**2–2**	Victory	Maclaren 60', Nabbout 63'	Margiotta 12', D'Agostino 81'	AAMI	19,640
2021–22	37	RS	19 March 2022	City	**1–1**	Victory	Good 45'	Rojas 19'	AAMI	18,080
2021–22	38	RS	9 April 2022	Victory	**3–0**	City	Brimmer 7' (pen.), Rojas 14', 27'	—	AAMI	17,754
2022–23	39	RS	22 October 2022	Victory	**0–2**	City	—	Maclaren 17' (pen.), Cadete 19' (o.g.)	AAMI	23,489
2022–23	40	RS	17 December 2022 (resumed on 5 April 2023)	City	**2–1**	Victory	O'Neill 11', 57'	Velupillay 89'	AAMI	18,036 (17 Dec), 6,423 (5 Apr)
2022–23	41	RS	18 February 2023	Victory	**3–2**	City	Da Silva 7', Fornaroli 46', Brillante 77'	Leckie 24', 80'	AAMI	18,011
2023–24	42	RS	23 December 2023	City	**0–0**	Victory	—	—	AAMI	25,884
2023–24	43	RS	17 February 2024	City	**0–0**	Victory	—	—	AAMI	20,877
2023–24	44	RS	6 April 2024	Victory	**2–1**	City	Fornaroli 34' (pen.), Da Silva 86'	Arslan 4'	AAMI	20,107
2023–24	45	FS	5 May 2024	Victory	**1–1** (a.e.t.) (3–2 p)	City	Velupillay 88'	Souprayen 29'	AAMI	21,358
2024–25	46	RS	26 October 2024	City	**1–3**	Victory	Nabbout 64'	Velupillay 5', Vergos 12', Teague 25'	AAMI	20,093
2024–25	47	RS	21 December 2024	Victory	**1–1**	City	Roderick 65'	Cohen 16'	AAMI	24,053
2024–25	48	RS	22 February 2025	Victory	**2–2**	City	Machach 45+7' (pen.), Santos 48'	Tilio 5', Trewin 70' (pen.)	AAMI	22,806
2024–25	49	FS	31 May 2025	City	**1–0**	Victory	Cohen 10'	—	AAMI	29,902
2025–26	RS	50	8 November 2025	Victory	**0–2**	City	—	Caputo 2', Antoniou 55'	AAMI	18,319
2025–26	RS	51	20 December 2025	City	**0–1**	Victory	—	Grimaldi 90+1'	AAMI	17,619
2025–26	RS	52	21 February 2026	City	**1–3**	Victory	Caputo 32'	Mata 20', 64', Santos 89'	AAMI	21,439
2026–27	RS	53	24 October 2026	Victory	**1–1**	City	Jelacic 7'	Nabbout 53'	AAMI	19,008
2026–27	RS	54	19 December 2026	City	v	Victory	—	—	AAMI	—
2026–27	RS	55	6 March 2027	Victory	v	City	—	—	AAMI	—
_{* RS: A-League Men regular season, FS: A-League Men finals series, GF: A-League Men grand final, CUP: FFA Cup, AAMI: Melbourne Rectangular Stadium, Marvel: Docklands Stadium}

=== Statistics ===
As of 21 February 2026

==== Head-to-head record ====
Competition	Matches	City wins	Draws	Victory wins	City goals	Victory goals
League regular season	48	15	15	18	73	68
League finals series	3	1	1	1	2	4
Australia Cup	1	1	0	0	2	0
Total	52	17	16	19	77	72

==== Comparative league placings ====
#	'06	'07	'08	'09	'10	'11	'12	'13	'14	'15	'16	'17	'18	'19	'20	'21	'22	'23	'24	'25	'26
1		**1**		**1**						**1**						**1**	**1**	**1**			
2					2							2			2		2			2	
3								3					3	3					3		
4									4		4	4	4								4
5			5			5				5				5						5	
6							6				6								6		6
7	7																				
8						8	8														
9	—N/a							9													
10	—N/a								10						10						
11	—N/a						—N/a											11			
12	—N/a															12					
13	—N/a																				—N/a

==== Top goalscorers ====
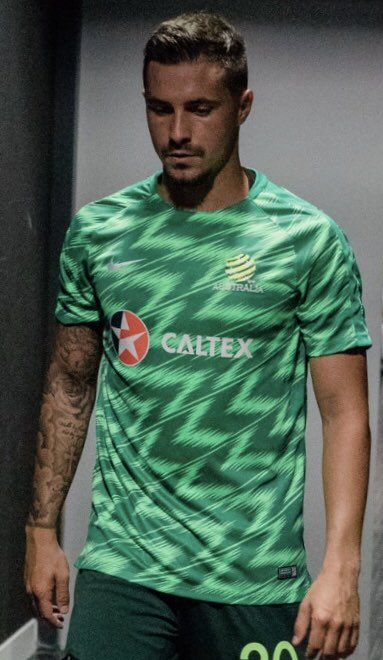
Jamie Maclaren is the Melbourne Derby's all-time top goalscorer with 10 goals

As of 21 February 2026

Player	Club	Goals
(Australia) Jamie Maclaren	Melbourne City	10
(Kosovo) Besart Berisha	Melbourne Victory	9
(Australia) Bruno Fornaroli	Melbourne City; Melbourne Victory	7
(New Zealand) Marco Rojas	Melbourne Victory	7
(Australia) Archie Thompson	Melbourne Victory	6
(New Zealand) Kosta Barbarouses	Melbourne Victory	5
(Sweden) Ola Toivonen	Melbourne Victory	4
(Australia) John Aloisi	Melbourne City	3
(Tunisia) Fahid Ben Khalfallah	Melbourne Victory	3
(Australia) Robbie Kruse	Melbourne Victory	3
(Australia) David Williams	Melbourne City	3

- Players in **bold** are still active for their club.

=== Records ===
- Most wins: Melbourne Victory (19)
- Biggest win: Melbourne City 7–0 Melbourne Victory (17 April 2021)
- Most consecutive wins: 3, Melbourne Victory (7 February 2015 – 17 October 2015), Melbourne City (7 February 2020 – 17 April 2021)
- Most consecutive matches undefeated: 8, Melbourne Victory (18 February 2023 – 22 February 2025, excluding 17 December 2022 match resumption on 5 April 2023)
- Most consecutive games without a draw: 8, (21 December 2013 – 19 December 2015, 15 October 2016 – 20 October 2018)
- Most consecutive draws: 3, (22 December 2018 – 21 December 2019, 6 June 2021 – 19 March 2022)
- Highest goalscorer: 10, Jamie Maclaren
- Highest goalscorer in one match: 5, Jamie Maclaren (17 April 2021)
- Player with most consecutive matches scored: 4, Besart Berisha (7 February 2015 – 19 December 2015)
- Highest attendance: 50,873 (8 May 2015)
- Lowest attendance (excluding behind closed doors): 11,467 (6 March 2021)

=== Honours ===
As of 31 May 2025

Competition	Melbourne City	Melbourne Victory
A-League Men Premiership	**3**	**3**
A-League Men Championship	2	**4**
Australia Cup	1	**2**
Total	6	9

==== Players who played for both clubs ====
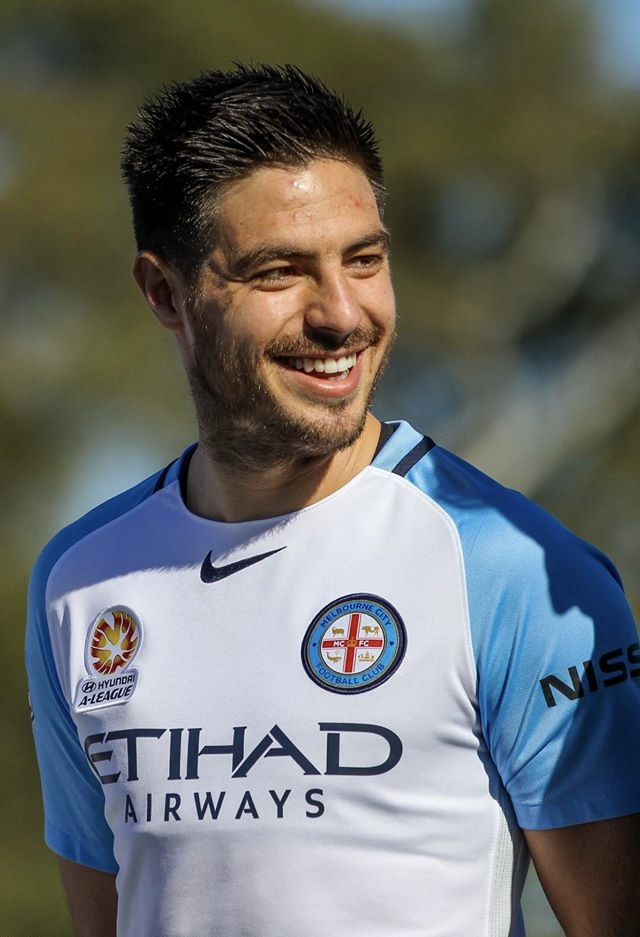
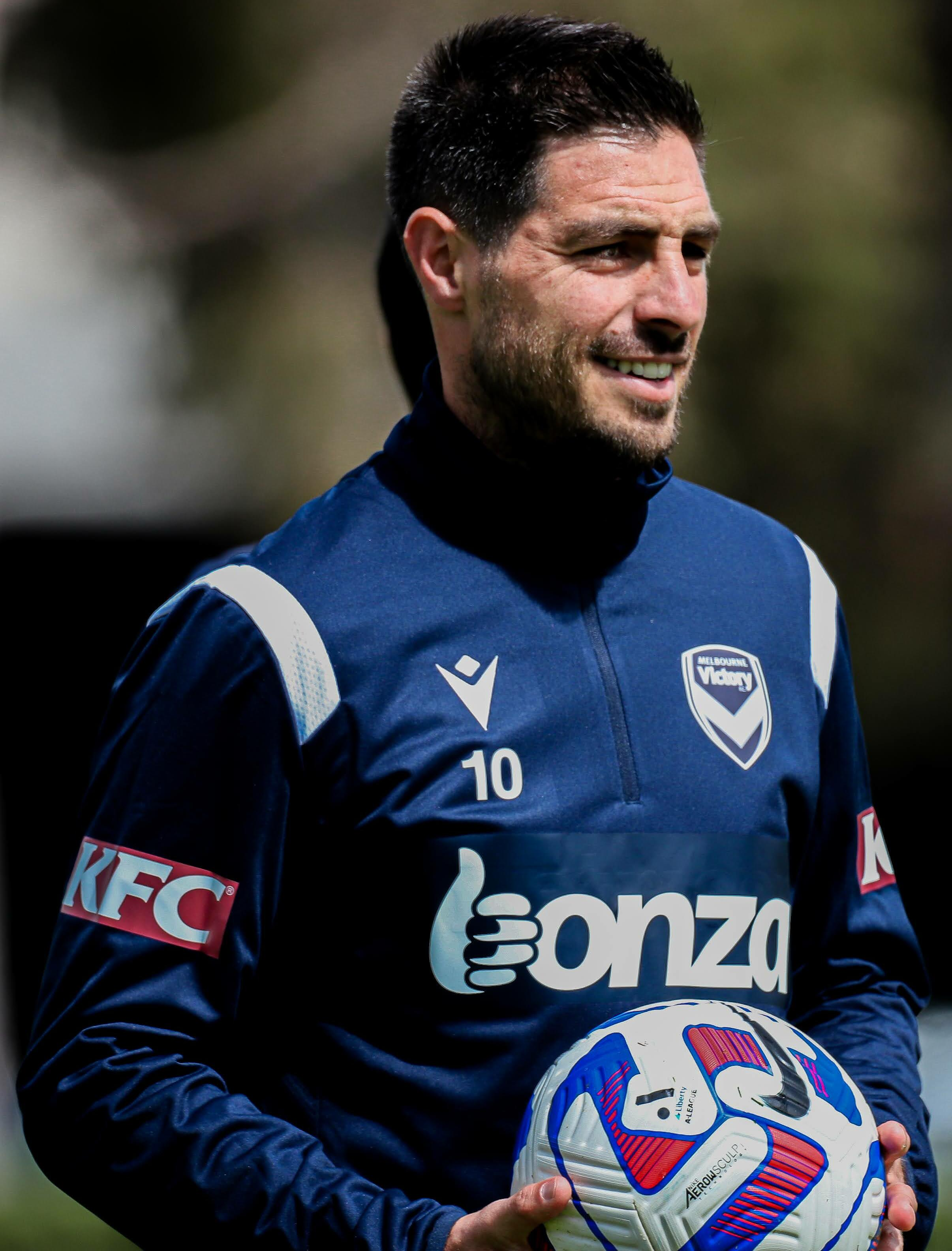
Bruno Fornaroli represented Melbourne City, before going on to represent Melbourne Victory

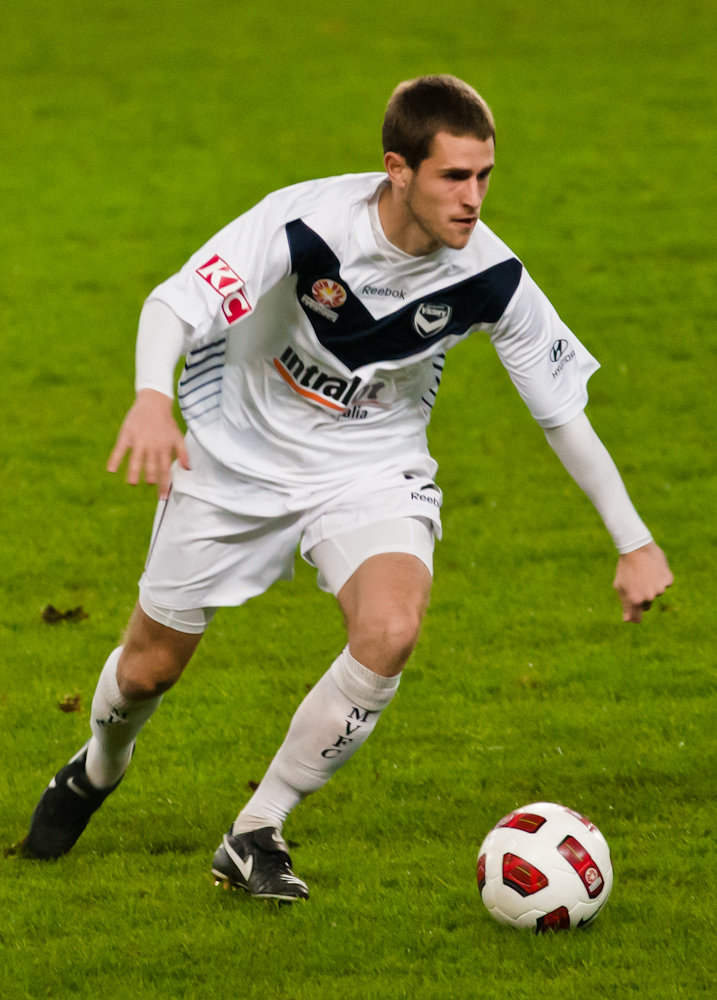
Mate Dugandžić became the first player to transfer directly between the two Melbourne clubs, when he joined Melbourne Heart from Melbourne Victory in February 2011

As of 21 February 2026

Player	Melbourne City career span	Melbourne Victory career span
(Australia) **Aziz Behich**	2010–2014, 2023–present	2009–2010
(Australia) Oliver Bozanic	2018	2015–2017
(Australia) Joshua Brillante	2019–2020	2021–2023
(Australia) Mate Dugandžić	2011–2015	2009–2011
(Brazil) Fred	2011–2013	2006–2007
(Australia) Scott Galloway	2019–2024	2013–2016
(North Macedonia) Daniel Georgievski	2021	2014–2017
(Australia) Brendan Hamill	2010–2012	2021–2022
(Australia) Harry Kewell	2013–2014	2011–2012
(Australia) Anthony Lesiotis	2018–2019, 2021–2022	2019–2020
(Australia) **Andrew Nabbout**	2020–present	2012–2015, 2019–2020
(Australia) Kristian Sarkies	2010–2012	2005–2007
(Australia) Tando Velaphi	2013–2015	2011–2013
(Australia) Bruno Fornaroli	2015–2019	2022–2025
(Australia) Bruce Kamau	2016–2018	2023
(Australia) Connor Chapman	2014–2017	2023–2024
(Australia) Daniel Arzani	2016–2018	2023–2025
(Australia) Ryan Teague	2026	2023–2025

== A-League Women ==
=== Matches ===
The Victory and City women's teams also compete in the A-League Women (formerly the W-League) and occasionally have 'double headers' where the men's teams play after the women's teams.

==== 2015–2020 ====
Season	Derby	Comp*	Date	Home team	Score	Away team	Goals (home)	Goals (away)	Venue	Attendance
2015–16	1	RS	25 October 2015	City	2–1	Victory	Tabain 48', Luik 72' (pen.)	Knight 90+2'	AAMI	2,311
2015–16	2	RS	6 December 2015	Victory	0–4	City	—	Beattie 35', Crummer 52', 72', Little 79'	Bulleen	—
2016–17	3	RS	27 November 2016	City	3–0	Victory	Fishlock 64', 77', Catley 75'	—	AAMI	1,943
2016–17	4	RS	15 January 2017	Victory	2–0	City	Dowie 1', Nairn 31'	—	Epping	467
2017–18	5	RS	3 November 2017	City	1–0	Victory	Stott 82'	—	AAMI	3,510
2017–18	6	RS	14 January 2018	Victory	2–1	City	Ayres 71', Gibbons 86'	Luik 63'	Epping	1,143
2018–19	7	RS	16 November 2018	City	0–2	Victory	—	Kellond-Knight 31' (o.g.), Gielnik 65'	AAMI	1,619
2018–19	8	RS	5 January 2019	Victory	1–0	City	Nairn 88'	—	Epping	1,265
2019–20	9	RS	12 December 2019	City	1–0	Victory	Kinga 89'	—	ABD	907
2019–20	10	RS	13 February 2020	Victory	0–4	City	—	Van Egmond 21', Emslie 31', 50', Simon 57'	Lakeside	1,097

==== 2021–present ====
Season	Derby	Comp*	Date	Home team	Score	Away team	Goals (home)	Goals (away)	Venue	Attendance
2020–21	11	RS	10 January 2021	City	0–6	Victory	—	Longo 15', Ayres 29', De Vanna 72', Jackson 80', Zimmerman 90', Cooney-Cross 90+2'	CB Smith	729
2020–21	12	RS	17 January 2021	Victory	2–3	City	Melinda Barbieri 47', Zimmerman 51'	Chidiac 22', Bunge 25' (o.g.), Withers 86'	Epping	1,034
2021–22	13	RS	12 December 2021	City	1–2	Victory	Jackson 49' (o.g.)	Zimmerman 65', Williams 70'	AAMI	1,092
2021–22	14	RS	26 December 2021	Victory	1–5	City	Markovski 84'	Wilkinson 5', 13', 26', 56', 75'	AAMI	4,682
2021–22	15	FS	20 March 2022	City	1–3	Victory	Tumeth 80'	Ayres 30', Bunge 47', Privitelli 53'	AAMI	1,306
2022–23	16	RS	15 January 2023	City	1–1	Victory	Wilkinson 37'	Chidiac 13'	Casey Fields	506
2022–23	17	RS	13 March 2023	Victory	2–0	City	Ayres 16' (pen.), Zois 20'	—	AAMI	1,655
2022–23	18	FS	15 April 2023	City	3–3 (a.e.t.) (1–4 p)	Victory	Pollicina 40', 79', Wilkinson 90+7'	Ayres 53' (pen.), 67', 72'	Casey Fields	742
2023–24	19	RS	23 December 2023	City	1–0	Victory	Ekic 10'	—	AAMI	6,286
2023–24	20	RS	17 March 2024	Victory	0–0	City	—	—	Home of The Matildas	2,012
2024–25	21	RS	9 November 2024	Victory	2–3	City	Gielnik 20' (pen.), Jančevski 42'	Speckmaier 6', 85', Bosch 64'	AAMI	3,850
2024–25	22	RS	1 February 2025	City	1–1	Victory	Speckmaier 89'	Lowe 5'	ctrl:cyber Pitch	1,565
2025–26	23	RS	23 December 2025	City	2–1	Victory	Bunge 65' (o.g.), McNamara 84'	Pollicina 32'	AAMI	1,323
2025–26	24	RS	15 February 2026	Victory	0–0	City	—	—	Home of The Matildas	1,566
2025–26	25	FS	2 May 2026	Victory	0–1	City	—	McKenna 45'	AAMI	4,953
2025–26	26	FS	9 May 2026	City	1–0	Victory	McMahon 34'	—	ctrl:cyber Pitch	1,607

=== Statistics ===
As of 9 May 2026

==== Matchup history ====
Competition	Matches	City wins	Draws	Victory wins
League regular season	22	11	4	7
League finals series	4	2	1	1
Total	26	13	5	8

==== Women's honours ====
Competition	Melbourne City	Melbourne Victory
A-League Women Premiership	5	1
A-League Women Championship	5	3
Total	10	4

== Combined honours ==
Title	Melbourne City	Melbourne Victory
A-League Men Premiership	3	3
A-League Men Championship	2	4
Australia Cup	1	2
Men's total	6	9
A-League Women Premiership	5	1
A-League Women Championship	5	3
Women's total	10	4
Total	16	13

== See also ==
- Sydney Derby
- The Big Blue (A-League Men)
- The Original Rivalry
