= Peter Zoïs =

Australian soccer player and manager (born 1978)

Peter Zois
Personal information
- Full name: Peter Zois
- Date of birth: 21 April 1978 (age 48)
- Place of birth: Melbourne, Australia
- Height: 1.86 m (6 ft 1 in)
- Position: Goalkeeper

Team information
- Current team: Preston Lions (GK Coach)

Youth career
- 1994–1997: VIS

Senior career*
Years	Team	Apps	(Gls)
- South Melbourne
1997–1998	Purfleet	1	(0)
1998	Cardiff City	1	(0)
1998–2003	NAC Breda	3	(0)
2003–2007	Willem II	22	(0)
2008	Altona Magic	2	(0)
2008	Frankston Pines	16	(0)
2009	Richmond	22	(0)
2010	South Melbourne	22	(0)
2010–2011	Melbourne Heart	0	(0)
2011	Oakleigh Cannons	25	(0)
Total		114	(0)

International career^{‡}
1997	Australia U-20	1	(0)
1997–2000	Australia U-23	5	(0)

Managerial career
- 2010–12: Melbourne Heart (GK Coach)
- 2012: Oakleigh Cannons
- 2014: Goulburn Valley Suns
- 2010–2017: Melbourne City (GK Coach)
- 2017: Green Gully (GK Coach)
- 2018–2019: Melbourne Victory Youth (GK Coach)
- 2020–2021: Central Coast Mariners (GK Coach)
- 2021–2025: Melbourne Victory Youth (GK Coach)
- 2021–2023: Melbourne Victory (GK Coach)
- 2026–: Preston Lions (GK Coach)
Medal record
Representing Australia
Men's Association football
OFC U-20 Championship
Winner	1997 Tahiti
- * Club domestic league appearances and goals as of 8 May 2014 ‡ National team caps and goals as of 1 May 2011

Peter Zoïs (born 21 April 1978) is a retired Australian footballer and former manager for Football Victorian side Oakleigh Cannons and Goulburn Valley Suns. Recently he was a goalkeeper coach for Melbourne City, Green Gully, Melbourne Victory Youth, Central Coast Mariners and Melbourne Victory. Currently as goalkeeper coach for Preston Lions in NPL Victoria.

== Career ==
Zois represented all of the Victorian State teams at junior level before receiving a scholarship at the Victorian Institute of Sport playing in the former National Youth League. Before making his move overseas he played a season with South Melbourne in the former National Soccer League. He also spent a short spell at Cardiff City, being brought in on a trial period due to an injury to Jon Hallworth. His only match for the Bluebirds came against Rotherham United which ended in a 2–2 draw, but an erratic performance led then manager Frank Burrows to cancel his trial spell the next day.

He moved to the Netherlands, joining NAC Breda in 1999–2000, which gained promotion to the Eredivisie after one season in the Dutch second division. During his time at NAC Breda he was part of the team that qualified for the Intertoto Cup and UEFA Cup. He then signed with Willem II in 2003 where he was also part of the team that played in the Intertoto and later beat Ajax in the semi-final of the KNVB Cup reaching the final only to lose to PSV Eindhoven. The following year Willem II played in the UEFA Cup.

Zois, has represented Australia at all youth levels and holds an EU (Greek) passport. Zois spent the 2009 and 2010 seasons in the Victorian Premier League.

Zois has taken on the role of Goalkeeping coach and player for the Melbourne Heart team in its first season. Due to a lack of goalkeeping talent Zois was also made back-up keeper for the club, appearing on the bench at each of their 30 matches for the home and away season.

During the A-League off season Zois decided to join VPL side, Oakleigh Cannons FC for the 2011 campaign.

== Coaching career ==
For the 2011–12 Melbourne Heart season, Zois will be the goalkeeping coach as well as again assuming the role of back-up keeper to Clint Bolton, after the club again failed to find a suitable person for the role.

In 2012 Peter Zois took over Oakleigh Cannons after the surprise resignation Huss Skenderovic Oakleigh won their first game under Zois against Bentleigh Greens 2–1

Under Zois Oakleigh went on an unbelievable run to the Grand Final however lost 2–1

== Honours ==
=== Player ===
NAC Breda

- Eerste Divisie : 1999–2000

Melbourne Heart

- Victorian Premier League: runners-Up 2011

Willem II

- 2004–05 KNVB Cup : Runners up

Australia U-20

- OFC U-19 Men's Championship: 1997

=== Coach ===
Oakleigh Cannons

- Victorian Premier League: runners-up 2012

=== Individual ===
- Victorian Premier League Goalkeeper Of The Year: 2010
