= Aziz Behich =

Australian professional footballer (born 1990)

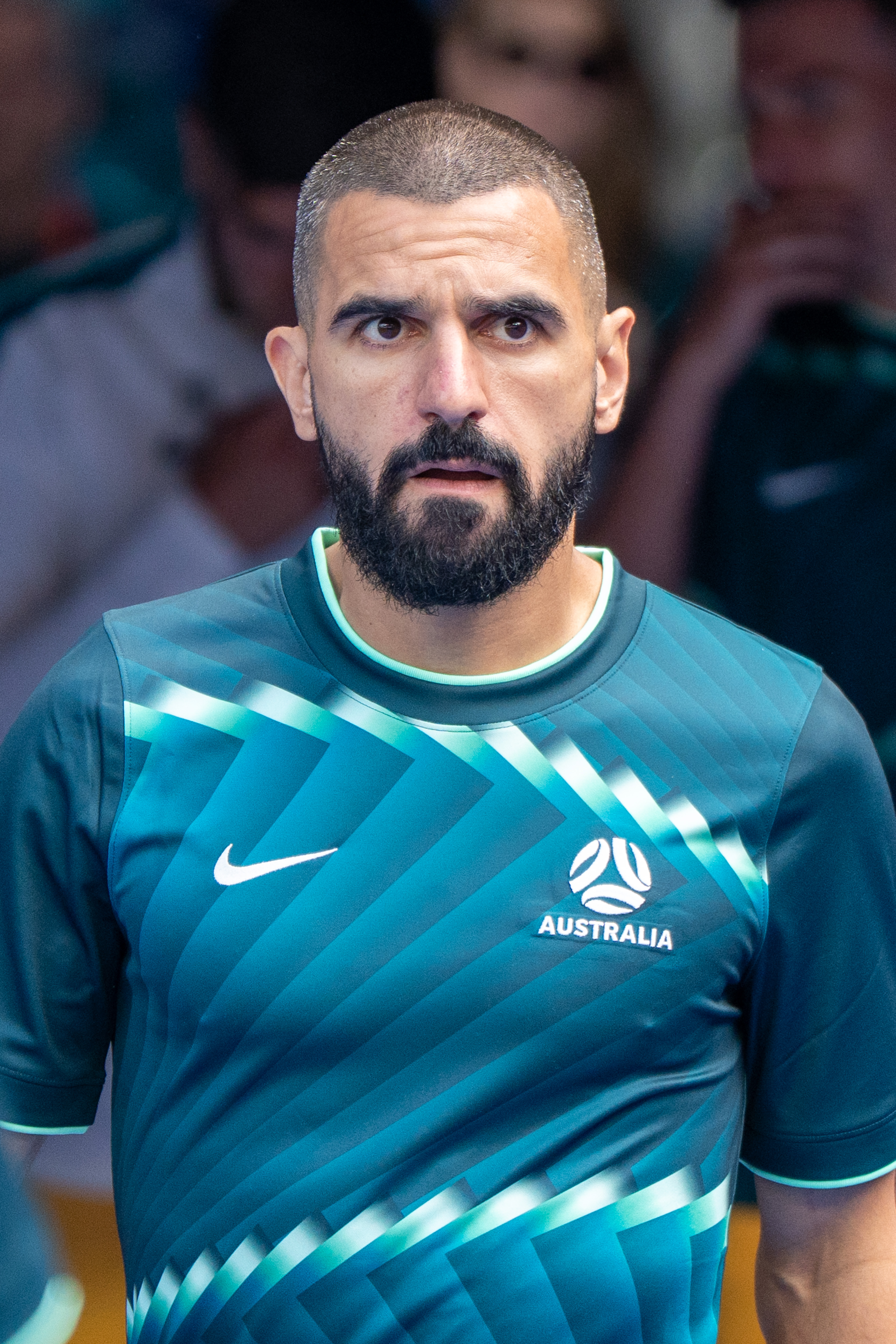
- Behich with Australia in 2026

Personal information
- Full name: Aziz Behich
- Date of birth: 16 December 1990 (age 35)
- Place of birth: Melbourne, Victoria, Australia
- Height: 1.70 m (5 ft 7 in)
- Position: Left back

Team information
- Current team: Melbourne City
- Number: 16

Youth career
- Meadow Park
- 2005–2007: Green Gully
- 2008–2010: Melbourne Victory

Senior career*
Years	Team	Apps	(Gls)
2008–2009	Green Gully	31	(4)
2009–2010	Melbourne Victory	5	(0)
2010	Hume City	6	(1)
2010–2013	Melbourne Heart	65	(1)
2013–2018	Bursaspor	122	(6)
2013–2014	→ Melbourne Heart (loan)	24	(1)
2018–2019	PSV Eindhoven	4	(0)
2019–2021	Başakşehir	5	(0)
2020–2021	→ Kayserispor (loan)	34	(0)
2021–2022	Giresunspor	34	(0)
2022–2023	Dundee United	26	(3)
2023–	Melbourne City	61	(5)
2024	→ Al Nassr (loan)	0	(0)

International career^{‡}
2011–2012	Australia U23	5	(1)
2012–	Australia	87	(3)
Medal record
Representing Australia
Men's Association football
AFC Asian Cup
Winner	2015
- * Club domestic league appearances and goals as of 5 June 2025 ‡ National team caps and goals as of 3 July 2026

Aziz Behich (Turkish: [aˈziz eɾaɫˈtaj beˈhit͡ʃ], /ˈæzɪz ˈbeɪ.ɪtʃ/ AZ-iz BAY-itch; born 16 December 1990) is an Australian professional soccer player who plays as a left back for A-League Men club Melbourne City and the Australia national team.

== Club career ==
=== Youth career ===
Behich played in the junior divisions of Green Gully SC. He participated in the junior leagues of Melbourne's North-West. He had played for the club's Reserve team in 2007. In February 2007 Behich had returned to Australia after having been training at the David Beckham Academy. In 2008 Behich was signed to the club's first team, surprisingly because the coach; Ian Dobson, had preferred experienced players within his squad, where he made his debut on 22 February 2008 in a 2–0 loss against Richmond. He had been substituted onto the field in the 57th minute. He had been promoted to the club's first team with teammate Diogo Ferreira, who also went on to sign for Melbourne during Behich's second youth season. In 2008, Behich scored two goals in 11 appearances while playing for Green Gully in Australia's Second Division. He had scored his two goals in a 6–1 win against Fawkner Blues on 17 May 2008, he had been substituted onto the field in the 76th minute and scored in both the 84th and 86th minutes.

Prior to the start of the 2008–2009 A-League's National Youth League, Behich was selected for Melbourne Victory's squad. On 3 January 2009, Aziz scored in a 3–0 win against Queensland Roar. One week later, he scored again in a 2–0 win against Perth Glory on 10 January 2009. Victory went on to finish in 6th position out of seven teams.

During the National Youth League's off-season, Behich would return to play for Green Gully in the 2009 season. Aziz had appeared 22 times for Green Gully, once in the final's play-offs, and had scored two goals overall. His second goal came in a play-off match against Altona Magic where which Behich was substituted onto the field in the 80th minute when Green Gully were trailing 3–2. Behich had scored an equaliser in the 94th minute to take the game to extra-time, however, Green Gully eventually lost 4–3 on penalties

The following season, Behich was the only youth player to re-sign with Melbourne's youth team and was handed the captain's arm band.

=== Melbourne Victory ===
Behich made his debut for Melbourne Victory's first team on 16 January 2010, in the 2009–10 A-League season, where he was substituted on to the field in the 83rd minute for Carlos Hernández in a 6–2 win against Perth Glory. His second appearance was on 23 January 2010, where he was substituted onto the field in the 91st minute, again for Carlos Hernández, in a 2–0 win against Adelaide United. Despite Matthew Theodore being the only player to sign from Melbourne's youth-team to its first team in 2009, as of 2010 Behich was the only youth player to gain a first-team appearance and consecutive first-team appearances. It was then announced, in January 2010, that Behich was named in Melbourne's 2010 AFC Champions League squad. He was substituted on during the second half of the 2009–2010 A-League Grand Final when Melbourne lost on penalties to Sydney, and is notable for the narrowest miss of the match, which could have been the winner. Behich then signed to Hume City in the Victorian Premier League during the A-League off-season.

=== Hume City ===
Behich debuted for Hume City in a 2–2 draw against Northcote City on 16 May 2010. Scoring on debut, he netted Hume city's second goal on 81 minutes. He appeared 5 more times for the side, departing from the club in June, as they finished in second spot of the Victorian Premier League table.

=== Melbourne Heart ===
By July 2010, he trialled with the Melbourne Heart squad where he took part in a round of warm up matches that the club played, including a 2–0 defeat against Everton. Behich, shortly after trialling with Melbourne Heart, signed a seven-week deal with the club as an injury replacement player for Kristian Sarkies until October 2010. After Dean Heffernan received a red card, Behich slotted into the starting lineup to cover his position, and started most games afterwards. On 25 October 2010, he signed a full-time contract with the Melbourne Heart, becoming the first player to play for both Melbourne Victory and Melbourne Heart. At Heart, he was developed into more of a defensive player, a left back or left winger, as opposed to the striker position he played at Victory. He was the first player to be sent off in a Melbourne derby, given his second yellow in the very first encounter between the clubs, which Heart won 2–1. In January, Behich was awarded the A-League Young Footballer of the month. It was reported on 28 January 2012 by the Dutch media that Behich had attracted the interest of Eredivisie club Excelsior and 2. Bundesliga sides VfL Bochum and Eintracht Frankfurt. Excelsior manager John Lammers spoke of his interest in the exciting youngster to Rotterdam newspapers Algemeen Dagblad and NRC Handelsblad: "We are looking to bring Aziz to the club, he's an exceptional talent who we've been watching."

=== Bursaspor ===
On 29 January 2013, Behich signed to Turkish Süper Lig club Bursaspor. On 11 March 2013, Aziz Behich made his Turkish Süper Lig debut for Bursaspor against Fenerbahçe as a 69th-minute substitute for Tuncay. On 4 March 2016, Behich signed three-year extension to his contract with Bursaspor, which was due to expire in May.

=== PSV Eindhoven ===
On 31 August 2018, Behich signed for Eredivisie club PSV Eindhoven for four years. The transfer fee paid to Bursaspor was reported as for $4.5 million

=== Başakşehir ===
On 24 May 2019, it was announced Behich would return to Turkey to join Başakşehir for the 2019–20 season, having agreed a three-year deal.

==== Kayserispor (loan) ====
On 2 October 2020, Behich joined Kayserispor on a season-long loan.

=== Giresunspor ===
On 26 August 2021, Behich joined recently promoted sided Giresunspor, in their return to the Süper Lig.

=== Dundee United ===
On 28 July 2022, Behich joined Dundee United on a free transfer, signing a two-year contract.

=== Return to Melbourne City ===
After parting ways with Dundee United, Behich signed a two-year deal for Melbourne City on 6 August 2023. This marked his return to the club after nine years overseas. At the start of the 2024–25 season, Behich was appointed captain.

==== Al-Nassr (loan) ====
On 31 January 2024, while on Asian Cup duty with the Socceroos, he joined Al-Nassr on loan for the remainder of the 2023–24 season. The loan fee was reported to be around $2 million AUD.

== International career ==
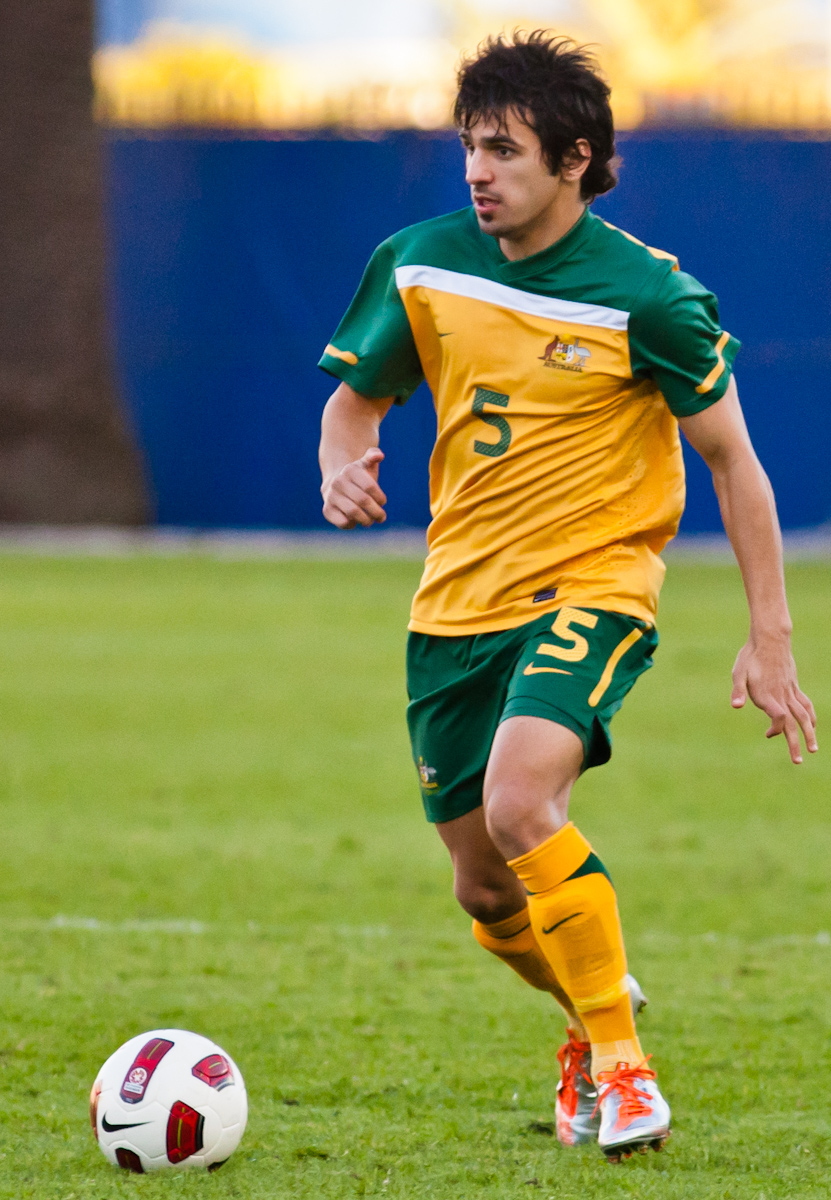
Behich in 2011

Behich was called up to the Australia Under-23 side by coach Aurelio Vidmar for a friendly match against Japan's Under-23 side at the Tohoku Denryoku Bigswan Stadium, Niigata on Wednesday 1 June 2011. Behich was selected to play against Yemen's under-23 side for the Football at the 2012 Summer Olympics – Men's Asian Qualifiers Preliminary Round 2. On 14 June 2011, in preparation for the 2012 AFC Men's Pre-Olympic Tournament, Behich featured in a 6–0 win against Singapore under-23 where he scored Australia's sixth goal in the 90th minute. On 19 June 2011 Behich played in Australia's first-leg 3–0 win against Yemen. Four days later he played in the second leg which resulted in a 4–0 win to Australia on 23 June.

Behich was called up to the Australian national team by Holger Osieck for a friendly match against South Korea on 14 November 2012, where he made his debut.

Behich scored his first international goals on 9 December 2012 against Chinese Taipei at the Hong Kong Stadium during the 2013 EAFF East Asian Cup.

He was included in Ange Postecoglou's 2015 AFC Asian Cup-winning squad where he played 2 matches as Australia won the tournament on home soil.

In May 2018 he was named in Australia's 23-man squad for the 2018 World Cup in Russia after being involved in the previous summer's Confederations Cup.

Behich was also called up to the Australia squad by manager Graham Arnold for the 2022 FIFA World Cup where he started all 4 matches during Australia's campaign to the Round of 16. Behich made a run past Argentinian defenders and had a chance at an equalising goal in the dying seconds of the Round of 16 game, but his shot was stopped by Emi Martinez. Behich was also a prominent member of Australia's squad in the 2023 AFC Asian Cup and all rounds of the 2026 World Cup qualifiers.

On 31 May 2026, Behich was selected in the 26-man squad for the 2026 FIFA World Cup.

== Personal life ==
Behich is a Muslim of Turkish Cypriot origin, son of immigrants to Australia from Cyprus. For this reason he was eligible to represent Turkey, Cyprus or Australia, eventually choosing the latter.

== Career statistics ==
=== Club ===
As of 6 June 2026

Appearances and goals by club, season and competition
Club	Season	League			National cup (Note: Includes Turkish Cup, KNVB Cup, Scottish Cup and FFA Cup)		League cup (Note: Includes Scottish League Cup)		Continental		Other		Total	
Club	Season	Division	Apps	Goals	Apps	Goals	Apps	Goals	Apps	Goals	Apps	Goals	Apps	Goals
Green Gully	2008	Victorian Premier League	11	2	—		—		—		—		11	2
Green Gully	2009	Victorian Premier League	22	2	—		—		—		—		22	2
Green Gully	Total		33	4	0	0	0	0	0	0	0	0	33	4
Melbourne Victory	2009–10	A-League	5	0	—		—		0	0	—		5	0
Hume City	2010	Victorian Premier League	6	1	—		—		—		—		6	1
Melbourne Heart	2010–11	A-League	27	0	—		—		—		—		27	0
Melbourne Heart	2011–12	A-League	24	1	—		—		—		—		24	1
Melbourne Heart	2012–13	A-League	14	0	—		—		—		—		14	0
Melbourne Heart	Total		65	1	0	0	0	0	0	0	0	0	65	1
Bursaspor	2012–13	Süper Lig	1	0	1	0	—		0	0	—		2	0
Bursaspor	2014–15	Süper Lig	29	0	8	0	—		2 (Note: Appearances in UEFA Europa League)	0	—		39	0
Bursaspor	2015–16	Süper Lig	26	1	5	0	—		—		1 (Note: Appearance in Turkish Super Cup)	0	32	1
Bursaspor	2016–17	Süper Lig	32	0	2	0	—		—		—		34	0
Bursaspor	2017–18	Süper Lig	31	5	3	0	—		—		—		34	5
Bursaspor	2018–19	Süper Lig	3	0	0	0	—		—		—		3	0
Bursaspor	Total		122	6	19	0	0	0	2	0	1	0	144	6
Melbourne Heart (loan)	2013–14	A-League	24	1	—		—		—		—		24	1
PSV Eindhoven	2018–19	Eredivisie	4	0	2	0	—		0	0	—		6	0
Başakşehir	2019–20	Süper Lig	5	0	4	0	—		2	0	—		11	0
Kayserispor (loan)	2020–21	Süper Lig	34	0	2	0	—		—		—		36	0
Giresunspor	2021–22	Süper Lig	34	0	0	0	—		—		—		34	0
Dundee United	2022–23	Scottish Premiership	31	3	2	1	2	0	1 (Note: Appearance in UEFA Conference League)	0	—		36	4
Melbourne City	2023–24	A-League Men	10	0	3	0	—		6 (Note: Appearances in the AFC Champions League)	1	—		19	1
Melbourne City	2024–25	A-League Men	27	2	1	0	—		—		—		28	2
Melbourne City	2025–26	A-League Men	25	3	0	0	—		9	0	—		34	3
Melbourne City	Total		62	5	4	0	0	0	15	1	0	0	81	6
Al-Nassr (loan)	2023–24	Saudi Pro League	0	0	0	0	—		3	0	0	0	3	0
Total			425	21	33	1	2	0	23	1	1	0	484	23

=== International ===
As of match played 3 July 2026

Appearances and goals by national team and year
National team	Year	Apps	Goals
Australia	2012	5	2
Australia	2013	0	0
Australia	2014	3	0
Australia	2015	4	0
Australia	2016	0	0
Australia	2017	7	0
Australia	2018	11	0
Australia	2019	8	0
Australia	2020	0	0
Australia	2021	9	0
Australia	2022	10	0
Australia	2023	6	0
Australia	2024	14	0
Australia	2025	4	1
Australia	2026	6	0
Total		87	3

Scores and results list Australia's goal tally first, score column indicates score after each Behich goal.

List of international goals scored by Aziz Behich
No.	Date	Venue	Opponent	Score	Result	Competition
1	9 December 2012	Hong Kong Stadium, Hong Kong	Chinese Taipei	5–0	8–0	2013 EAFF East Asian Cup
2	9 December 2012	Hong Kong Stadium, Hong Kong	Chinese Taipei	7–0	8–0	2013 EAFF East Asian Cup
3	5 June 2025	Perth Stadium, Perth	Japan	1–0	1–0	2026 FIFA World Cup qualification

== Honours ==
Green Gully

- Victorian Premier League Premiers: 2008

Başakşehir

- Süper Lig: 2019–20

Melbourne City

- A-League Men Championship: 2025

Australia

- AFC Asian Cup: 2015

Individual

- PFA A-League Team of the Season: 2011–12
- AFC Asian Cup Team of the Tournament: 2023
