= Nick Kalmar =

Australian soccer player

Personal information
- Full name: Nicholas Kalmar
- Date of birth: 15 October 1987 (age 39)
- Place of birth: Melbourne, Australia
- Height: 1.90 m (6 ft 3 in)
- Positions: Attacking midfielder; second striker

Youth career
- Melbourne Knights

Senior career*
| Years | Team | Apps | (Gls) |
| 2004–2005 | Altona | 44 | (3) |
| 2006 | Preston Lions | 5 | (2) |
| 2006 | St Albans Saints | 22 | (3) |
| 2007 | Sunshine Georgies | 22 | (2) |
| 2008–2009 | Altona Magic | 38 | (6) |
| 2010 | Oakleigh Cannons | 9 | (2) |
| 2010–2014 | Melbourne City | 69 | (6) |
| 2014–2015 | Western Sydney Wanderers | 10 | (1) |
| 2016 | Geelong SC | 9 | (3) |
| 2016 | Samut Sakhon | 8 | (2) |
| 2016 | Arema Cronus | 14 | (1) |
| 2017–2018 | Dandenong City | 54 | (14) |
| 2019 | Green Gully | 24 | (4) |
| 2020–2022 | Dandenong City | 34 | (12) |

Managerial career
- 2025–: Dandenong City U23
- * Club domestic league appearances and goals as of 17 November 2022

Nicholas Kalmar (born 15 October 1987) is an Australian former soccer player who did played for Melbourne Heart and Western Sydney Wanderers in the A-League and also for Altona East, Altona Magic, Sunshine Georgies and Dandenong City.

== Club career ==
After his departure from Sunshine George Cross in 2007 he had a stint in Croatia before returning to Australia. On 29 June 2010 he signed a one-year contract with Melbourne Heart after impressing head coach, John van 't Schip, in several trials and friendlies before the start of the 2010-2011 A-league season. On 26 December 2014, Kalmar signed to Western Sydney Wanderers on a short-term injury replacement contract. In June 2016, Kalmar joined Victoria State League 2 North-West club Geelong SC, managed by close friend and former teammate Steve Laurie.
