= Clint Bolton =

Australian association football player

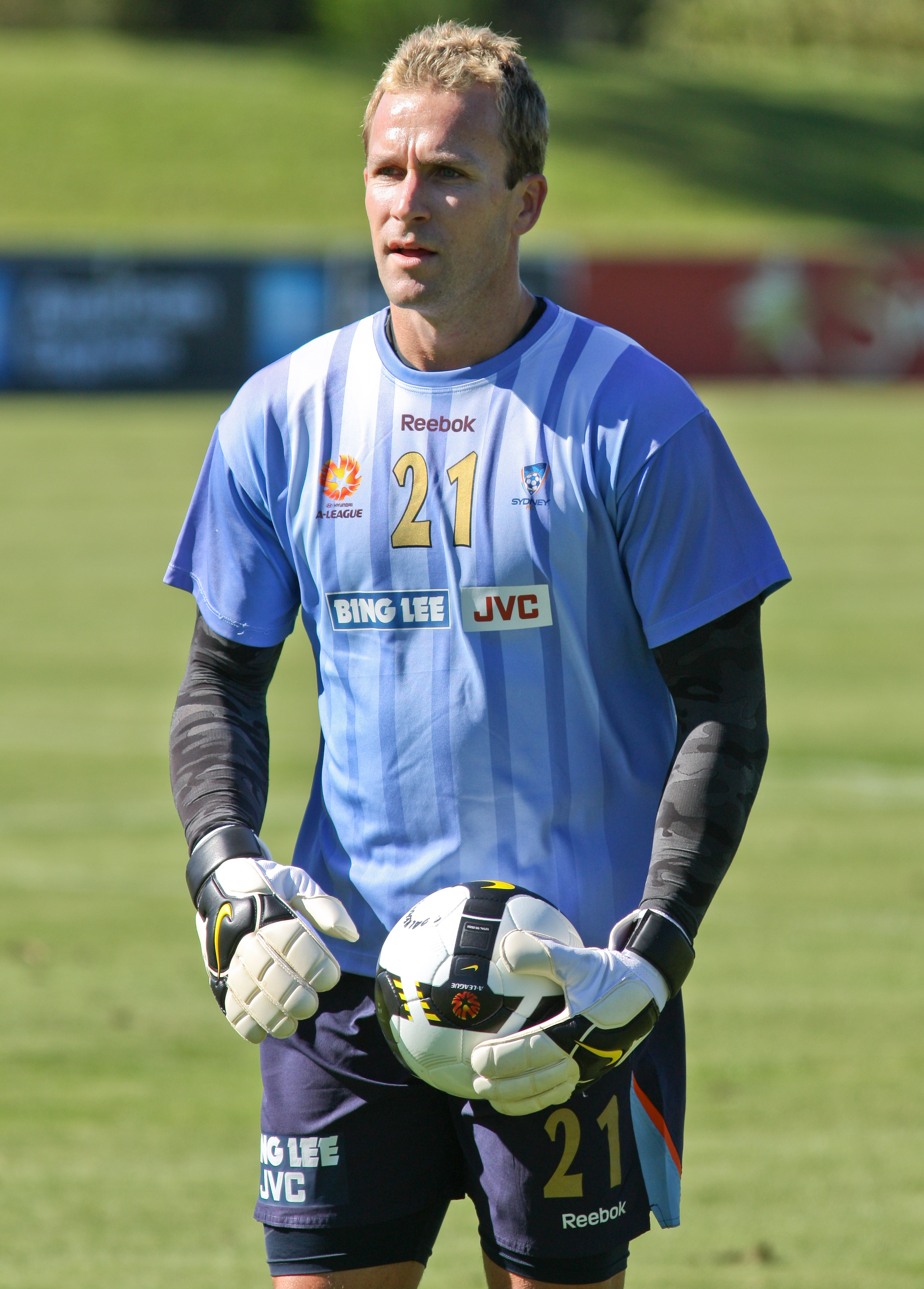
- Bolton training with Sydney FC ahead of the 2009–10 season

Personal information
- Full name: Clint Brian Bolton
- Date of birth: 22 August 1975 (age 51)
- Place of birth: Bundaberg, Australia
- Height: 6 ft 2 in (1.88 m)
- Position: Goalkeeper

Youth career
- Alloway, Bundaberg
- 1987–1991: Aston Villa
- 1992–1993: AIS

Senior career*
Years	Team	Apps	(Gls)
1993–2000	Brisbane Strikers	178	(0)
2000–2003	Sydney Olympic	95	(0)
2003–2004	Parramatta Power	28	(0)
2004	Fraser Park	10	(0)
2004–2005	APIA Leichhardt	11	(0)
2005–2010	Sydney FC	110	(0)
2010–2013	Melbourne Heart	70	(0)
Total		502	(0)

International career
1994–1995	Australia U-20	8	(0)
1995–1996	Australia U-23	5	(0)
2000–2006	Australia	4	(0)
Medal record
Representing Australia
Men's Association football
OFC Nations Cup
Winner	2000 Tahiti
FIFA Confederations Cup
Third place	2001 South Korea-Japan
OFC U-20 Championship
Winner	1994 Fiji
- * Club domestic league appearances and goals

Clint Brian Bolton (born 22 August 1975) is an Australian former goalkeeper. He was one of the most experienced goalkeepers in the history of the National Soccer League, which preceded the A-League. He played over 300 games for Brisbane Strikers, Sydney Olympic FC and Parramatta Power, and won two A-League championships with Sydney FC.

== Club career ==
=== Brisbane Strikers ===
Bolton began his career at the Brisbane Strikers in 1993 signing for the club after spending a year at the Australian Institute of Sport. He spent seven seasons at the club making 178 appearances for the Brisbane Strikers, keeping 51 clean sheets. He also won the National Soccer League final in 1997 with the club. In 2000, Bolton signed for Sydney Olympic FC.

=== Sydney Olympic FC ===
Sydney Olympic was Bolton's second club and he spent three seasons at the club making 95 appearances for the club making 32 clean sheets. In the 2001–02 National Soccer League competition, Sydney Olympic won the NSL title. The club also made it to the NSL final in the 2002–03 season, but were defeated by Perth Glory in the final. After three seasons at the club, Bolton signed for the Parramatta Power.

=== Parramatta Power ===
Parramatta signed Bolton in 2003 after Bolton had spent the previous three seasons at Sydney Olympic. He played one season for the club making 27 appearances and keeping 11 clean sheets. In the final National Soccer League competition in 2003–04, Parramatta made it to the NSL Grand Final against the Perth Glory. The winner would be the final winner of the National Soccer League competition which had been running since 1977. Bolton was making his 300th NSL appearance and it was to be his last. The Parramatta Power lost the game in extra-time 1–0 to Perth Glory in the final game of the season and the final game of the NSL competition. After the NSL competition had folded, Bolton was looking for another club to keep his match practice and fitness. He opted to sign for firstly Fraser Park FC where he made 10 appearances and afterwards he signed for APIA Leichhardt. He then went on to sign for Sydney FC for the inaugural A-League season.

=== Sydney FC ===
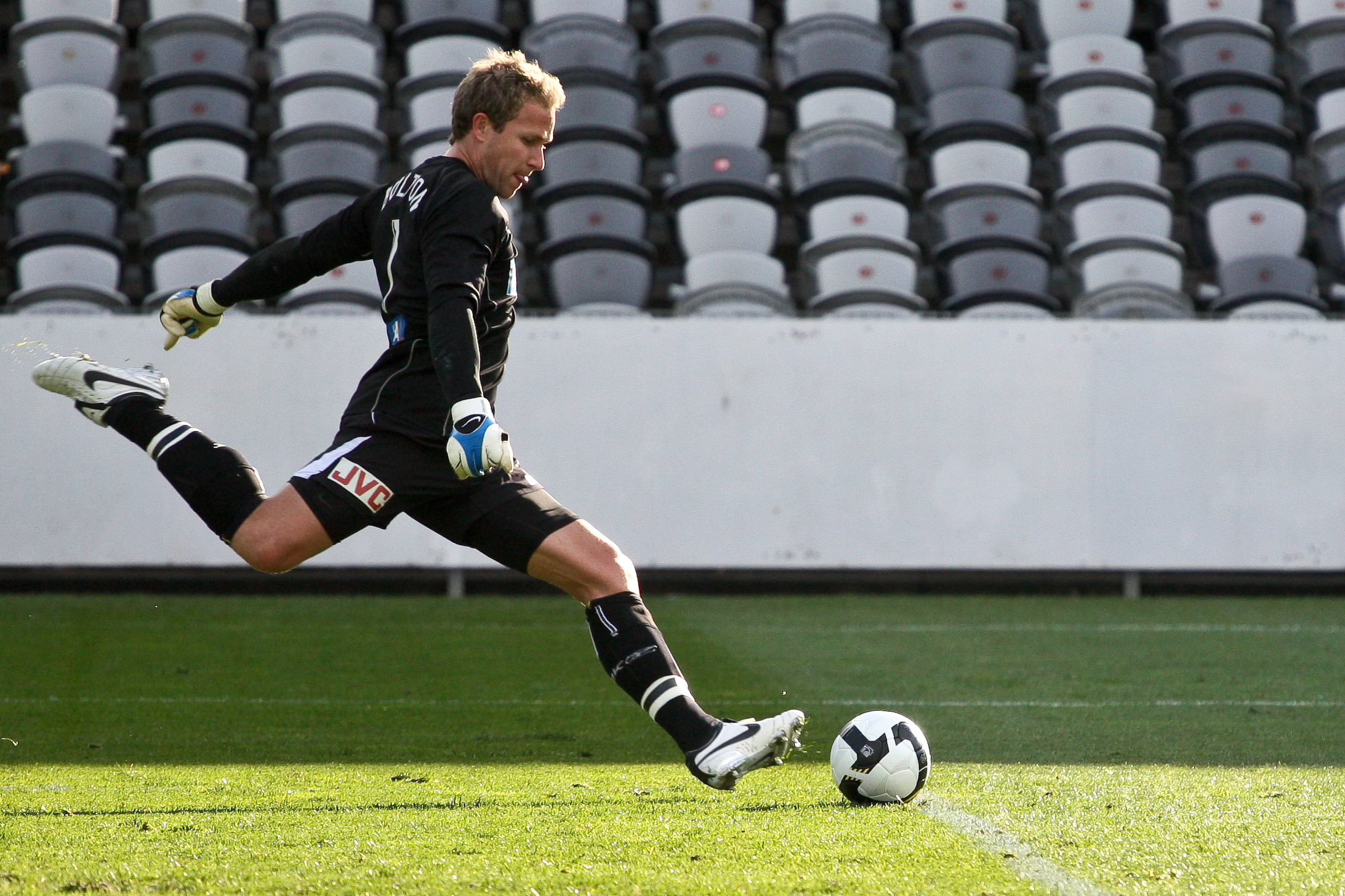
Clint Bolton takes a kick for Sydney FC

Bolton signed for Sydney FC from APIA Leichhardt for the inaugural A-League season. He made his Sydney FC league debut against the Melbourne Victory on 28 August 2005. He helped his side to the inaugural A-League Grand Final against the Central Coast Mariners in which Sydney won by one goal to nil. He played every game throughout the season in the league (24 games) for Sydney FC making five clean sheets. He was voted as Sydney FC player of the year for the 2005–06 season ahead of the other nominees Dwight Yorke, Alvin Ceccoli and David Carney. On receiving the honour Bolton stated

"It is always an honour to win an award like this, especially when it is voted on by your team mates. It has been a great year for Sydney FC, winning the Championships and doing well at the Club World Championships, and to receive this award is very flattering. We have all worked incredibly hard over the last 13 months since we started training and to be singled out amongst the players we have is special."

On 1 January 2007 he achieved a record five consecutive clean sheets, beating Central Coast Stopper Danny Vukovic's record of four. He again played every match of the A-League season in 2006–07 for Sydney, and is currently the club's highest capped player. Bolton was only the second player to reach 100 competitive games for the Sky Blues when he played the first pre-season match against Queensland Roar. He received a standing ovation and a guard of honour as he ran out. In a statement given after the 2–1 victory he said he was extremely happy to have reached the milestone and hopes he can continue his career with Sydney for another 3–5 years.

=== Melbourne Heart ===
On 16 February 2010, it was announced that Bolton had signed for the new A-League club Melbourne Heart as the team's inaugural goalkeeper. He played in every minute of the Heart's thirty matches in its first season in the A-League, and earned seven clean sheets along the way. He was accoladed for his efforts at the end of the season by receiving the club's 'player of the year' award.

As a result of the Heart finishing second-to-last on the A-League ladder, their worst finish in an A-League season, Bolton, along with teammates Simon Colosimo, Matt Thompson and Fred, were released by the Heart at the conclusion of the 2012–13 A-League season. Bolton joined Melbourne Heart as Strategic Projects Manager in July 2013.

== Club career statistics ==
Club	Season	Domestic	League		Cup^{[A]}		Asia^{[B]}		Other^{[C]}		Total	
Club	Season	Domestic	Apps	Goals	Apps	Goals	Apps	Goals	Apps	Goals	Apps	Goals
Sydney FC	2005–06	A-League	24	0	4	0	5	0	5	0	38	0
Sydney FC	2006–07	A-League	23	0	5	0	6	0	-	-	34	0
Sydney FC	2007–08	A-League	21	0	5	0	-	-	2	0	28	0
Sydney FC	2008–09	A-League	10	0	2	0	-	-	-	-	12	0
Sydney FC	2009–10	A-League	31	0	-	-	-	-	-	-	31	0
Melbourne Heart	2010–11	A-League	30	0	-	-	-	-	-	-	30	0
Melbourne Heart	2011–12	A-League	26	0	-	-	-	-	-	-	26	0
Melbourne Heart	2012–13	A-League	14	0	-	-	-	-	-	-	14	0
Australia total			179	0	16	0	11	0	6	0	214	0

Source: worldfootball.net, football-lineups.com

A. ^{a} Includes the Pre-Season Challenge Cup (2005–2008) and the FFA Cup.

B. ^{a} For the purposes of this table, "Asia" also includes the Oceania Club Championship (OFC).

C. ^{a} "Other" matches include OFC Club Championship Australian Qualifying Tournament, FIFA Club World Cup and the Pan-Pacific Championships

== International career ==
Bolton was part of the Australian Under-20 squad for the 1995 FIFA World Youth Championship in Qatar. He also appeared for the Olyroos in qualifiers for the 1996 Olympic Games, but was not included in the squad for the final tournament. He made his senior international debut for Australia against Paraguay in 2000, and was a squad member when Australia won the 2000 OFC Nations Cup. He subsequently represented Australia against Tonga and Fiji in 2001, keeping clean sheets in all of his three international appearances.

On 16 August 2006, Bolton was recalled to the Socceroos side, after 20 appearances on the bench over the years, in a second-string Australian line-up for an Asian Cup qualifier against Kuwait. He kept a clean sheet and helped Australia to a 2–0 win.

== National team statistics ==
Australia national team
Year	Apps	Goals
2000	1	0
2001	2	0
2002	0	0
2003	0	0
2004	0	0
2005	0	0
2006	1	0
Total	4	0

== Honours ==
Brisbane Strikers

- NSL Championship: 1996–97

Sydney Olympic

- NSL Championship: 2001–02

Sydney FC

- A-League Championship: 2005–06, 2009–10
- A-League Premiership: 2009–10
- Oceania Club Championship: 2004–05

Australia

- OFC Nations Cup: 2000
- FIFA Confederations Cup: 3rd place, 2001

Australia U-20

- OFC U-20 Championship: 1994

=== Individual ===
- A-League Goalkeeper of the Year: 2005–06
- Sydney FC Player of the Year: 2005–06
- Melbourne Heart Player of the Year: 2010–11, 2011-12
- PFA A-League Team of the Season: 2011–12
- Sydney FC Hall of Fame: 2015
- Sydney FC Team of the Decade: 2006-2015
