= Alex Terra =

Brazilian footballer (born 1982)

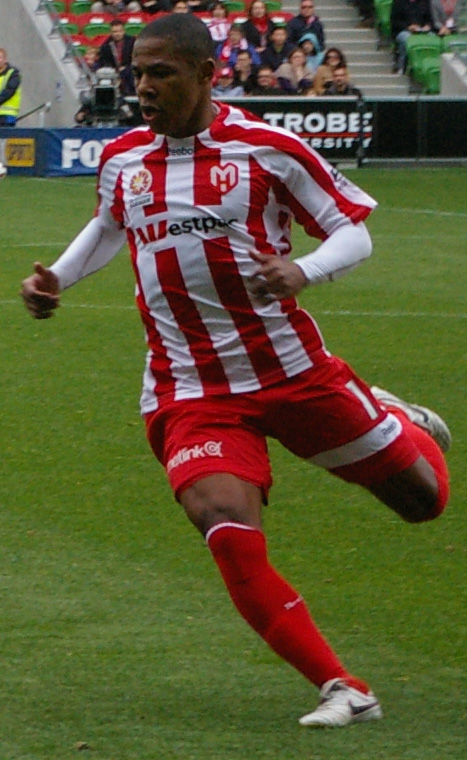
- Alex playing for Melbourne Heart in 2010

Personal information
- Full name: Alex Barbosa de Azevedo Terra
- Date of birth: 2 September 1982 (age 44)
- Place of birth: São João de Meriti, Brazil
- Height: 1.66 m (5 ft 5 1/2 in)
- Position: Forward

Youth career
- 2000–2002: Cabofriense

Senior career*
Years	Team	Apps	(Gls)
2002–2007	Fluminense	50	(6)
2005	→ Nacional (loan)	4	(0)
2007	→ Ponte Preta (loan)	24	(19)
2008–2009	Goiás	17	(3)
2009	Bahia	16	(0)
2010	Rio Branco	8	(1)
2010–2012	Melbourne Heart	43	(7)
2012	Daejeon Citizen	21	(4)
2014	Duque de Caxias	18	(7)
2014	Valletta	6	(3)
2015	Penapolense	3	(3)
- * Club domestic league appearances and goals as of 9 February 2016

Alex Barboza de Azevedo Terra (born 2 September 1982), known as Alex Terra, Terra-lad or Alex, is a Brazilian footballer who last played as a forward for Penapolense.

== Career ==
=== Brazil ===
Alex Terra began his professional career at Fluminense where he won numerous trophies in the Brazilian top flight. His performances with Fluminense won him a loan transfer to Portugal's C.D. Nacional, and later to Ponte Preta in the Campeonato Brasileiro Série B, where he scored 19 times in 24 games. His fine form in the Série B saw him return to the top flight with a transfer to Goiás.

In 2008 due to a serious injury on his left knee he was not able to play the entire season while he was at Goiás, and in February 2009, Alex managed to secure a deal with Portuguesa, but he did not pass the medical tests and did not sign with them. In March, he signed a one-year deal with Bahia, where he did not live up to the club's expectations of him, and was released by the club in June.

Alex signed a short-term deal with Rio Branco in February 2010, in order to play the remainder of the Campeonato Paulista season. He played in eight games and scored one goal against Palmeiras. Rio Branco were eventually relegated to the second division of the Campeonato Paulista.

=== Australia ===
At the completion of his stint with Rio Branco, on 10 May 2010 it was announced that he would be joining new A-League franchise Melbourne Heart, for their inaugural 2010–11 season. He made his competitive debut for the Heart in the club's first A-League match, in which it was defeated one–nil by the Central Coast Mariners. He made himself a fan favourite through his pace and flair, in addition to scoring important and spectacular goals, including the winning goal against crosstown rivals Melbourne Victory in the first-ever Melbourne derby, and a stunning bicycle-kick goal against Perth Glory.

The latter was cited by many publications as the goal of the season, and was recognised by Fox Sports as one of the best goals in A-League history. He managed to play in 20 matches and score four goals for the season, despite persistent injuries hampering him throughout. On 6 April 2012 it was announced that he would be leaving the club at the end of the 2011–12 A-League season.

=== South Korea ===
On 4 July 2012, Alex Terra signed a one-year deal with the South Korean outfit Daejeon Citizen.

== Valletta FC ==
On 31 August 2014, Alex Terra signed a one-year deal with Maltese side Valletta F.C

== Honours ==
With Fluminense:

- Copa do Brasil: 2007
- Campeonato Carioca: 2002, 2005
