= Matt Thompson (soccer) =

Australian soccer player

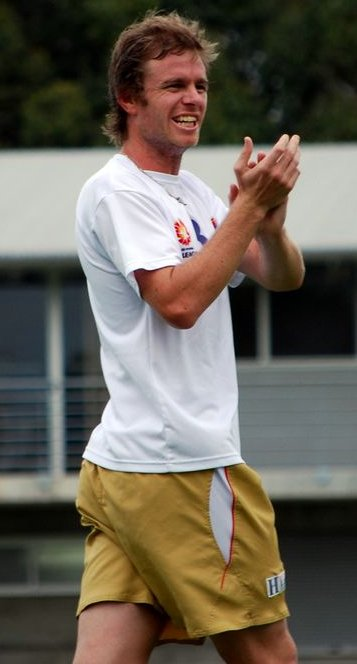
- Thompson training for Newcastle Jets

Personal information
- Full name: Matthew Thompson
- Date of birth: 18 August 1982 (age 44)
- Place of birth: Sydney, New South Wales, Australia
- Height: 1.82 m (5 ft 11 1/2 in)
- Positions: Central defender; defensive midfielder

Team information
- Current team: Valentine FC

Senior career*
Years	Team	Apps	(Gls)
1999	Macarthur Rams	4	(0)
1999–2004	Parramatta Power	93	(8)
2004	Macarthur Rams	4	(1)
2004–2005	Marconi Stallions	20	(2)
2005–2010	Newcastle Jets	121	(19)
2010–2013	Melbourne Heart	82	(7)
2013–2014	Sydney FC	18	(1)
2014	Marconi Stallions	6	(2)
2014	PTT Rayong	11	(0)
2015–2019	Maitland FC	88	(33)
2020	Lambton Jaffas	12	(2)
2021–	Valentine FC	9	(0)

International career^{‡}
2009–2010	Australia	4	(0)
- * Club domestic league appearances and goals as of 11 November 2021 ‡ National team caps and goals as of 20 January 2010

Matthew Thompson (born 18 August 1982) is a soccer player who plays for Lambton Jaffas of the National Premier Leagues.

== Club career ==
=== Newcastle Jets ===
He scored a spectacular goal against Central Coast Mariners in Leg 2 of the 2005-06 semi-finals. He scored a similarly spectacular goal in Round 20 of the 2006–07 season against Adelaide United.

On 20 December 2008 he scored a hat trick, against Melbourne Victory at EnergyAustralia Stadium in their shock 4–2 upset victory.

Thompson was made captain of the Jets in the 2009-2010 due to a new Newcastle Jets policy that the player who has the most top-flight appearances for the club would receive the captain's armband.

=== Melbourne Heart ===
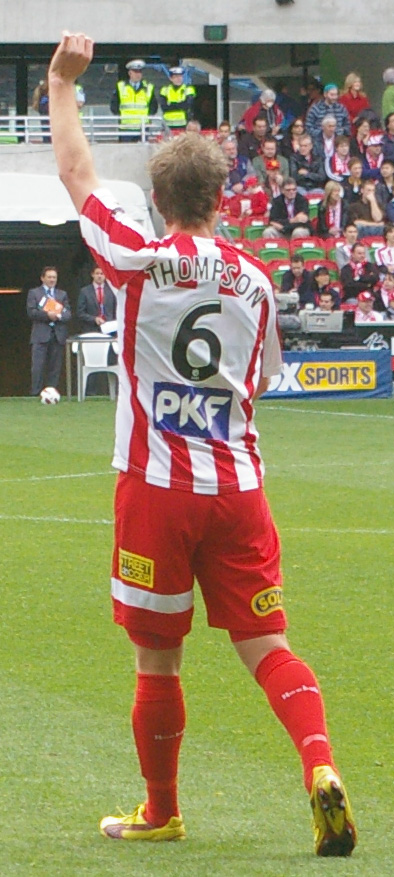
Thompson with Melbourne Heart

On 24 November 2009 he signed a contract with 2010-11 A-League expansion club, Melbourne Heart, becoming one of the club's first signings. Thompson is the record games holder for the A- league.

captained the club under Dutch international John Van Schip..

As a result of the Heart finishing second-to-last on the A-League ladder, their worst finish in an A-League season, Thompson, along with teammates Simon Colosimo, Clint Bolton and Fred, were released by the Heart at the conclusion of the 2012-13 A-League season.

=== Sydney FC ===
On 11 October 2013, he signed with Sydney FC as an injury replacement for Peter Triantis. He made his debut on the same day in Round 1 of the 2013–14 season against Newcastle Jets.

== International career ==
Thompson made his first senior international debut for the Socceroos on 28 January 2009 in an AFC Asian Cup qualifying match versus Indonesia.

== Honours ==
With Newcastle Jets:

- A-League Championship: 2007–08
