= 2007–08 Queensland Roar FC season =

Coordinates: 27°27′53″S 153°0′34″E

Queensland Roar FC
2007–08 season
- Chairman: John Ribot
- Manager: Frank Farina
- A-League: 4th
- Pre-Season Cup: 3rd
- Top goalscorer: League: Reinaldo – 6 Goals; All: Reinaldo – 9 Goals
- Highest home attendance: 36,221 v Sydney FC
- Lowest home attendance: 8,815 v Central Coast Mariners
- Average home league attendance: 18,556
Home colours	Away colours

The 2007–08 Queensland Roar season was the club's third season participating in the A-League where they would finish in fourth place in the regular season.

== 2007–08 season ==
Failure to qualify for the 2006–2007 finals series resulted in the release from contract of defenders Chad Gibson (the club's first captain and A-league pin-up boy) and Swiss import Remo Buess. Both left on good terms with the club during January 2007 stating that the team had to be altered to make it more competitive in the future.

In further evidence of "spring cleaning" in preparation for Season 3, Chinese signing Yuning Zhang was released from a contract with the Roar. Billed as the Chinese David Beckham, Zhang underwhelmed Roar supporters and returned to China in search of a club within the local scene there.

Danny Tiatto signed a two-year contract with Queensland Roar, becoming Frank Farina's first 07/08 signing. Tiatto, who had played in England for the past 11 years for Leicester City and Manchester City, agreed to terms with Queensland after Melbourne declined to sign him.

Farina has highlighted his favoritism toward young Queensland and indeed Australian players with the signings for the 2007–08 season of highly rated Queenslanders and Youth International Strikers Robbie Kruse and Tahj Minniecon, as well as attacking Midfielder Mitch Nichols. Also, the contracts of highly rated 20-year-olds Chris Grossman and Ben Griffin have been renewed, while Farina has given two-year contracts to Queenslanders Under-17 International Striker Tahj Minniecon and Under-20 and AIS Scholarship holder Robbie. These signings made the Roar a team consisting predominantly of young Queenslanders.

Queensland Roar's German import Marcus Wedau has been released from the remaining year of his contract by the A-League club on compassionate grounds. Wedau, 31, will return to Germany to be with his pregnant partner who is expecting their first child in October.

On 25 July 2007, Craig Moore was unveiled as the new marquee player for the Roar, returning to his native home state of Queensland, Australia, to play in the 2007/2008 Hyundai A-League Season and the 2008–2009 season

== Squad ==
Note: Flags indicate national team as defined under FIFA eligibility rules; some limited exceptions apply. Players may hold more than one non-FIFA nationality.

No.	Pos.	Nation	Player
1	GK	AUS	Liam Reddy
2	MF	AUS	Andrew Packer
4	DF	AUS	Craig Moore (marquee and captain)
5	DF	AUS	Josh McCloughan
6	DF	AUS	Stuart McLaren
7	MF	AUS	Michael Zullo (youth)
8	MF	AUS	Massimo Murdocca
9	FW	SCO	Simon Lynch
10	FW	AUS	Ante Milicic
11	FW	BRA	Reinaldo
12	FW	AUS	Tahj Minniecon (youth)

No.	Pos.	Nation	Player
13	FW	AUS	Zoran Petrevski
14	DF	AUS	Ben Griffin
15	MF	AUS	Matt McKay
16	MF	KOR	Hyuk-Su Seo
17	MF	AUS	Mitch Nichols (youth)
18	MF	AUS	Danny Tiatto
19	DF	AUS	Sasa Ognenovski
21	MF	AUS	Chris Grossman (youth)
22	FW	AUS	Robbie Kruse (youth)
23	MF	BRA	Marcinho
30	GK	AUS	Griffin McMaster (injury cover)

=== Trialists ===
Position	Name	Current club
FW	Victor Fenehia	Mitchelton FC
DF	Blake Charity	AIS
DF	Joel Peach	AIS
FW	Gareth Musson	Mitchelton FC

== Transfers ==
=== In ===
Name	Position	Moving from
Danny Tiatto	Midfield	Leicester City (England)
Tahj Minniecon	Forward	AIS
Robbie Kruse	Forward	AIS
Chris Grossman	Midfield	AIS / Rochedale Rovers
Mitch Nichols	Midfield	Palm Beach
Matthew Ham	Goalkeeper	Brisbane Wolves
Griffin McMaster	Goalkeeper	Mount Gravatt Hawks
Michael Zullo	Midfield	Brisbane City Soccer Club
Marcinho (Brazil)	Forward	São Paulo FC (Brazil)
Craig Moore	Defender	Newcastle United FC (England)
Zoran Petrevski	Forward	Preston Lions

=== Out ===
Name	Position	Moving to
Chad Gibson	Defender	Released: contract not renewed
Remo Buess (Switzerland)	Defender	Released: contract not renewed
Yuning Zhang (China)	Forward	Released: contract not renewed
Dario Vidosic	Midfield	1. FC Nürnberg (Germany)
Spase Dilevski	Midfield	FC Universitatea Craiova (Romania)
Marcus Wedau (Germany)	Midfield	Released: compassionate grounds
Tom Willis	Goalkeeper	Released: contract not renewed
Ante Milicic	Forward	Free Transfer: Shahzan Muda FC (December 2007)

Foreign player
Marquee

== Pre-season ==
Date	Home team	Score	Away team	Stadium	Scorers
30 May 2007	Palm Beach Sharks	0–5	Queensland Roar	Runaway Bay Sports Super Centre, Gold Coast, Queensland	McCloughan 7', Marcinho 30', Minniecon 44', Murdocca 60', Peach 66'
5 June 2007	Queensland Roar	3–0	Brisbane City	Luxury Paint Stadium Richlands, Brisbane, Queensland	Reinaldo 4', Milicic 50', Murdocca 65'
12 June 2007	Queensland Roar	13–0	Souths Utd, Brisbane	Luxury Paint Stadium Richlands, Brisbane, Queensland	Reinaldo, Milicic, Murdocca, Nichols, McKay, Fenehia, Wedau, Kruse
19 June 2007	Queensland Roar	5–1	Mt Gravatt Hawks	Luxury Paint Stadium Richlands, Brisbane, Queensland	Milicic 26', McKay 45+1', 55', Volker (Hawks), Musson 89', Zullo 90+1'
27 June 2007	Queensland Roar	5–0	Brisbane Strikers	Luxury Paint Stadium Richlands, Brisbane, Queensland	Milicic 18', Kruse 43', Marcinho 55', 78', Reinaldo 62'
1 July 2007	Queensland Roar	4–1	Supersport United FC	Suncorp Stadium, Brisbane, Queensland	Reinaldo 12', 37', Lynch 52', Minniecon 70', Mashego (Supersport) 39'
7 July 2007	Capricorn Cougars	0–6	Queensland Roar	Jardine Park, Rockhampton, Queensland	Reinaldo 10', 85', Lynch 13', Milicic 44', Marcinho 61', Kruse 73'
17 August 2007	Queensland Roar	1–1	Solomon Islands	Luxury Paint Stadium Richlands, Brisbane, Queensland	Menapi (Solomons) 19', Milicic 48'

=== Pre-season Cup group stage ===
Round	Date	Home team	Score	Away team	Crowd	Stadium	Scorers
1	14 July 2007	Queensland Roar	0–0	Sydney FC	4,892	Maroochydore Soccer Club	
2	21 July 2007	Central Coast Mariners	1–1	Queensland Roar	3,531	Wade Park	Boogaard (CCM) 6', Lynch 60'
3	27 July 2007	Wellington Phoenix	1–2	Queensland Roar	4,081	Queen Elizabeth II Park	Lynch 41', Ognenovski 50', Old (Phoenix) 47'

=== Pre-season Cup semi-final ===
5 August 2007
18:00 UTC+9:30

Adelaide United	3–2	Queensland Roar
Djite 1'; Petta 45'; Cássio 64'	(Report)	Lynch 16'; Milicic 73'

Hindmarsh Stadium,
Adelaide, South Australia
Attendance: 5,221
Referee: Angelo Nardi

=== Pre-season Cup third place playoff ===
12 August 2007
16:00 UTC+10

Central Coast Mariners	1–3	Queensland Roar
Simon 9'	(Report)	Milicic 30'; Nichols (red card) 33'; Marcinho 48'; Seo (red card) 76'; Reinaldo 86'

Bluetongue Stadium
Attendance: 3,500 (estimate)
Referee: James Lewis

== Hyundai A-League fixtures ==
=== Home and Away ===
25 August 2007 1	Queensland Roar (Australia)	2 : 2	(Australia) Adelaide United	Suncorp Stadium, Brisbane
19:00 UTC+10	McKay 45'; Moore (yellow card) 63' (yellow-red card) 68'; Ognenovski 76'	Report; Summary	Burns 8'; Djité 47'	Attendance: 16,828; Referee: (Australia) Ben Williams

2 September 2007 2	Newcastle Jets (Australia)	1 : 1	(Australia) Queensland Roar	EnergyAustralia Stadium, Newcastle
17:00 UTC+10	J. Griffiths 89'	Report; Summary	Reinaldo 70'; McLaren (yellow card) 42' (yellow-red card) 85'	Attendance: 13,144; Referee: (Australia) Simon Przydacz

6 September 2007 3	Queensland Roar (Australia)	0 : 1	(Australia) Central Coast Mariners	Suncorp Stadium, Brisbane
20:00 UTC+10		Report; Summary	Kwasnik 55'	Attendance: 8,815; Referee: (Australia) Mark Shield

16 September 2007 4	Perth Glory (Australia)	1 : 2	(Australia) Queensland Roar	Members Equity Stadium, Perth
17:00 UTC+8	Harnwell 14'	Report; Summary	McCloughan 21'; McKay 84'	Attendance: 7,203; Referee: (Australia) Ben Williams

22 September 2007 5	Queensland Roar (Australia)	0 : 1	(Australia) Sydney FC	Suncorp Stadium, Brisbane
19:00 UTC+10		Report; Summary	Patrick 69'	Attendance: 16,582; Referee: (Australia) Mark Shield

28 September 2007 6	Melbourne Victory (Australia)	2 : 0	(Australia) Queensland Roar	Telstra Dome, Melbourne
20:00 UTC+10	Muscat 68' (pen.); Thompson 85'	Report; Summary		Attendance: 25,622; Referee: (Australia) Ben Williams

5 October 2007 7	Queensland Roar (Australia)	2 : 1	(New Zealand) Wellington Phoenix	Suncorp Stadium, Brisbane
20:00 UTC+10	Zullo 4'; Kruse 45+1'	Report; Summary	Smeltz 90+5'	Attendance: 12,458; Referee: (Australia) Craig Zetter

14 October 2007 8	Central Coast Mariners (Australia)	0 : 1	(Australia) Queensland Roar	Bluetongue Stadium, Gosford
17:00 UTC+10	Porter (red card) 31'	Report; Summary	McCloughan 5'	Attendance: 8,113; Referee: (New Zealand) Peter O'Leary

19 October 2007 9	Newcastle Jets (Australia)	1 : 1	(Australia) Queensland Roar	EnergyAustralia Stadium, Newcastle
20:00 UTC+10	J. Griffiths 49' (pen.)	Report; Summary	Kruse 1'	Attendance: 12,326; Referee: (Australia) Mark Shield

27 October 2007 10	Queensland Roar (Australia)	3 : 3	(Australia) Perth Glory	Suncorp Stadium, Brisbane
19:00 UTC+10	Marcinho 45+3'; Lynch 69' (pen.), 86'	Report; Summary	Moore 18' (o.g.); Harnwell 43'; Coyne 90+3'	Attendance: 16,715; Referee: (Australia) Ben Williams

2 November 2007 11	Adelaide United (Australia)	0 : 1	(Australia) Queensland Roar	Hindmarsh Stadium, Adelaide
19:30 UTC+10:30		Report; Summary	Reinaldo 63'	Attendance: 10,705; Referee: (Australia) Peter Green

11 November 2007 12	Queensland Roar (Australia)	3 : 0	(New Zealand) Wellington Phoenix	Suncorp Stadium, Brisbane
17:00 UTC+10	Reinaldo 67' (pen.), 79'; Marcinho 83'	Report; Summary	Elrich (red card) 34'	Attendance: 13,808; Referee: (Australia) Matthew Breeze

16 November 2007 13	Queensland Roar (Australia)	1 : 0	(Australia) Melbourne Victory	Suncorp Stadium, Brisbane
19:00 UTC+10	Kruse 10'	Report; Summary		Attendance: 17,207; Referee: (Australia) Ben Williams

25 November 2007 14	Sydney FC (Australia)	0 : 0	(Australia) Queensland Roar	Sydney Football Stadium, Sydney
19:00 UTC+11		Report; Summary	Packer (yellow card) 43' (yellow-red card) 83'	Attendance: 16,569; Referee: (Australia) Matthew Breeze

30 November 2007 15	Queensland Roar (Australia)	0 : 1	(Australia) Newcastle Jets	Suncorp Stadium, Brisbane
19:00 UTC+10		Report; Summary	J. Griffiths 90+2'	Attendance: 14,193; Referee: (Australia) Peter Green

9 December 2007 16	Queensland Roar (Australia)	2 : 1	(Australia) Central Coast Mariners	Suncorp Stadium, Brisbane
18:00 UTC+10	Vidmar 21' (o.g.); McKay 28'	Report; Summary	J.Aloisi 13'	Attendance: 16,442; Referee: (Australia) Ben Williams

14 December 2007 17	Wellington Phoenix (New Zealand)	1 : 1	(Australia) Queensland Roar	Westpac Stadium, Wellington
19:30 UTC+12	Smeltz 24'	Report; Summary	Reinaldo 5'	Attendance: 9,384; Referee: (Australia) Ben Williams

30 December 2007 18	Perth Glory (Australia)	1 : 4	(Australia) Queensland Roar	Members Equity Stadium, Perth
19:00 UTC+9	Rizzo 57'	Report; Summary	Kruse 34'; Reinaldo 42'; Minniecon 59'; McCloughan 74'	Attendance: 9,614; Referee: (Australia) Peter Green

5 January 2008 19	Queensland Roar (Australia)	1 : 2	(Australia) Melbourne Victory	Suncorp Stadium, Brisbane
19:00 UTC+10	Marcinho 73'	Report; Summary	Allsopp 56'; Thompson 63'	Attendance: 21,475; Referee: (Australia) Matthew Breeze

13 January 2008 20	Queensland Roar (Australia)	0 : 0	(Australia) Sydney FC	Suncorp Stadium, Brisbane
18:00 UTC+10		Report; Summary		Attendance: 31,933; Referee: (Australia) Mark Shield

20 January 2008 21	Adelaide United (Australia)	2 : 0	(Australia) Queensland Roar	Hindmarsh Stadium, Adelaide
18:30 UTC+10:30	Djite 18'; Pantelis 45'	Report; Summary	Tiatto (red card) 41'	Attendance: 10,803; Referee: (Australia) Strebre Delovski

=== Finals ===
25 January 2008 Minor SF Leg 1	Sydney FC (Australia)	0 : 0	(Australia) Queensland Roar	Sydney Football Stadium, Sydney
20:00 UTC+11		Report; Summary		Attendance: 23,450; Referee: (Australia) Mark Shield

8 February 2008 Minor SF Leg 2	Queensland Roar (Australia)	2 : 0 (2 : 0 agg.)	(Australia) Sydney FC	Suncorp Stadium, Brisbane
20:07 UTC+10 (Delayed Kickoff)	Reinaldo 13'; S. Ognenovski 84' (pen.)	Report; Summary	Middleby (red card) 20'	Attendance: 36,221; Referee: (Australia) Mark Shield

17 February 2008 Preliminary Final	Newcastle Jets (Australia)	3 : 2 (a.e.t.)	(Australia) Queensland Roar	EnergyAustralia Stadium, Newcastle
18:00 UTC+11	Thompson 40'; J.Griffiths 104' (pen.); Elrich 111'	Report; Summary	Reinaldo 90+2' (pen.), 118' (pen.); Moore (yellow card) 77' (yellow-red card) 112'	Attendance: 16,021; Referee: (Australia) Peter Green

== Ladder position ==
Pos	Team	Pld	W	D	L	GF	GA	GD	Pts	Qualification
1	Central Coast Mariners	21	10	4	7	30	25	+5	34	Qualification for 2009 AFC Champions League group stage and Finals series (Note: First place qualifies for the 2009 AFC Champions League group stage. Winning the 2008 A-League Grand Final earns qualification for the 2009 AFC Champions League group stage, unless the Grand Final winners are also first place, in which case the Grand Final runner up qualifies.)
2	Newcastle Jets (C)	21	9	7	5	25	21	+4	34	Qualification for 2009 AFC Champions League group stage and Finals series
3	Sydney FC	21	8	8	5	28	24	+4	32	Qualification for 2008 Pan-Pacific Championship and Finals series
4	Queensland Roar	21	8	7	6	25	21	+4	31	Qualification for Finals series
5	Melbourne Victory	21	6	9	6	29	29	0	27	
6	Adelaide United	21	6	8	7	31	29	+2	26	
7	Perth Glory	21	4	8	9	27	34	−7	20	
8	Wellington Phoenix (Note: Wellington Phoenix cannot qualify for the AFC Champions League as they are not recognised as an AFC club.)	21	5	5	11	25	37	−12	20	

Source: ultimatealeague.com
Rules for classification: 1) points; 2) goal difference; 3) number of goals scored.
(C) Champions
