= 2007–08 A-League =

31st season of top-tier soccer league in Australia

A-League
- Season: 2007–08
- Dates: 24 August 2007 – 24 February 2008
- Champions: Newcastle Jets (1st title)
- Premiers: Central Coast Mariners (1st title)
- AFC Champions League: Newcastle Jets, Central Coast Mariners
- Matches: 111
- Goals: 223 (2.01 per match)
- Top goalscorer: Joel Griffiths (12 goals)
- Best goalkeeper: Michael Theoklitos
- Biggest home win: Central Coast Mariners 3–0 Wellington Phoenix; Wellington Phoenix 4–1 Perth Glory; Adelaide United 4–1 Melbourne Victory; Adelaide United 4–1 Wellington Phoenix; Queensland Roar 3–0 Wellington Phoenix; Wellington Phoenix 3–0 Perth Glory; Melbourne Victory 3–0 Wellington Phoenix; Central Coast Mariners 3–0 Newcastle Jets
- Biggest away win: Newcastle Jets 1–4 Perth Glory; Perth Glory 1–4 Queensland Roar; Central Coast Mariners 2–5 Melbourne Victory
- Highest scoring: Central Coast Mariners 4–5 Sydney FC
- Longest winning run: 4 games Newcastle Jets
- Longest unbeaten run: 6 games Melbourne Victory
- Longest winless run: 11 games Perth Glory
- Longest losing run: 4 games Adelaide United; Wellington Phoenix
- Highest attendance: 33,458
- Lowest attendance: 6,252
- Average attendance: 14,610 ( 1683)

The 2007–08 A-League was the 31st season of top-flight soccer in Australia, and the third season of the A-League competition since its establishment in 2004. Football Federation Australia hoped to build on the success of the previous two seasons and on the interest generated by Sydney FC and Adelaide United playing in the 2007 AFC Champions League, and the Socceroos competing in the 2007 AFC Asian Cup.

Based on their A-League 2006-07 season performances Adelaide United and Melbourne Victory competed in the 2008 AFC Champions League, making it two consecutive seasons in the competition for Adelaide United. Based on the 2007–08 season of the A-League, the Central Coast Mariners and Newcastle Jets qualified for the 2009 AFC Champions League, as the competition's Premiers and Champions respectively.

Changes included:

- The New Zealand Knights, who folded at the conclusion of the 2006–07 season, were replaced by Wellington Phoenix.
- An increase of the squad size, from 20 to 23 players, increasing the salary cap from A$1.6 million to A$1.8 million.

== Clubs ==

Team	Location	Stadium	Capacity
Adelaide United	Adelaide	Hindmarsh Stadium	17,000
Central Coast Mariners	Gosford	Bluetongue Stadium	20,119
Melbourne Victory	Melbourne	Telstra Dome	56,347
Newcastle Jets	Newcastle	Energy Australia Stadium	26,164
Perth Glory	Perth	Members Equity Stadium	18,156
Queensland Roar	Brisbane	Suncorp Stadium	52,500
Sydney FC	Sydney	Aussie Stadium	42,500
Wellington Phoenix	Wellington	Westpac Stadium	34,500

=== Foreign players ===
Club	Visa 1	Visa 2	Visa 3	Visa 4	Non-Visa foreigner(s)	Former player(s)
Adelaide United	(Brazil) Cássio	(Brazil) Diego Walsh	(Netherlands) Bobby Petta		(Ivory Coast) Jonas Salley^{1}	
Central Coast Mariners	(Germany) André Gumprecht				(Malta) John Hutchinson^{2}	
Melbourne Victory	(Brazil) Leandro Love	(Costa Rica) Carlos Hernández	(England) Joe Keenan	(Scotland) Grant Brebner		
Newcastle Jets	(Brazil) Denni	(Brazil) Mário Jardel	(South Korea) Song Jin-hyung			(Argentina) Jorge Drovandi
Perth Glory	(England) James Robinson	(Croatia) Mate Dragicevic			(Liberia) Jerry Karpeh^{1}	
Queensland Roar	(Brazil) Marcinho	(Brazil) Reinaldo	(Scotland) Simon Lynch		(South Korea) Seo Hyuk-su^{1}	
Sydney FC	(Brazil) Juninho	(Brazil) Patrick da Silva	(Northern Ireland) Terry McFlynn	(United States) Michael Enfield		(England) Michael Bridges^{3} (France) Michael Herbet^{3}
Wellington Phoenix	(Brazil) Cleberson	(Brazil) Daniel	(Brazil) Felipe	(Brazil) George		

The following do not fill a Visa position:
^{1}Those players who were born and started their professional career abroad but have since gained Australian Residency (and New Zealand Residency, in the case of Wellington Phoenix);
^{2}Australian residents (and New Zealand residents, in the case of Wellington Phoenix) who have chosen to represent another national team;
^{3}Injury Replacement Players, or National Team Replacement Players;
^{4}Guest Players (eligible to play a maximum of ten games)

=== Salary cap exemptions and captains ===
Club	Marquee	Captain	Vice-Captain
Adelaide United	(Australia) Paul Agostino	(Australia) Michael Valkanis	(Australia) Travis Dodd
Central Coast Mariners	(Australia) Tony Vidmar	(Australia) Alex Wilkinson	None
Melbourne Victory	(Australia) Archie Thompson	(Australia) Kevin Muscat	None
Newcastle Jets	(Brazil) Mário Jardel	(Australia) Jade North	(Australia) Ante Covic
Perth Glory	(Australia) Stan Lazaridis	(Australia) Simon Colosimo	None
Queensland Roar	(Australia) Craig Moore	(Australia) Craig Moore	None
Sydney FC	(Brazil) Juninho	(Australia) Tony Popovic	None
Wellington Phoenix	(Australia) Ahmad Elrich	(Australia) Ross Aloisi	(New Zealand) Tim Brown

== Pre-Season Challenge Cup ==
The pre-season cup competition was held in July and August in the lead up to the start of the A-League season. The opening round began on 14 July 2007. The competition featured a group stage, with three regular rounds, followed by a two-week finals playoff.

The pre-season cup was won by Adelaide United at the final on 12 August 2007.

== Regular season ==
The league season took a triple round-robin format over 21 rounds between 24 August 2007 and 20 January 2008 with each team playing the other seven teams three times.

=== League table ===
Pos	Team	Pld	W	D	L	GF	GA	GD	Pts	Qualification
1	Central Coast Mariners	21	10	4	7	30	25	+5	34	Qualification for 2009 AFC Champions League group stage and Finals series (Note: First place qualifies for the 2009 AFC Champions League group stage. Winning the 2008 A-League Grand Final earns qualification for the 2009 AFC Champions League group stage, unless the Grand Final winners are also first place, in which case the Grand Final runner up qualifies.)
2	Newcastle Jets (C)	21	9	7	5	25	21	+4	34	Qualification for 2009 AFC Champions League group stage and Finals series
3	Sydney FC	21	8	8	5	28	24	+4	32	Qualification for 2008 Pan-Pacific Championship and Finals series
4	Queensland Roar	21	8	7	6	25	21	+4	31	Qualification for Finals series
5	Melbourne Victory	21	6	9	6	29	29	0	27	
6	Adelaide United	21	6	8	7	31	29	+2	26	
7	Perth Glory	21	4	8	9	27	34	−7	20	
8	Wellington Phoenix (Note: Wellington Phoenix cannot qualify for the AFC Champions League as they are not recognised as an AFC club.)	21	5	5	11	25	37	−12	20	

Source: ultimatealeague.com
Rules for classification: 1) points; 2) goal difference; 3) number of goals scored.
(C) Champions

=== Round 1 ===
24 August 2007	Sydney FC	0–1	Central Coast Mariners	Sydney Football Stadium, Sydney
20:00 UTC+10		Report; Summary	Petrovski 7'	Attendance: 18,457; Referee: Peter Green

25 August 2007	Queensland Roar	2–2	Adelaide United	Suncorp Stadium, Brisbane
19:00 UTC+10	McKay 45'; Ognenovski 76'	Report; Summary	Burns 8'; Djité 47'	Attendance: 16,828; Referee: Ben Williams

26 August 2007	Perth Glory	0–0	Newcastle Jets	Members Equity Stadium, Perth
15:00 UTC+8		Report; Summary		Attendance: 8,508; Referee: Simon Przydacz

26 August 2007	Wellington Phoenix	2–2	Melbourne Victory	Westpac Stadium, Wellington
16:00 UTC+12	Daniel 79'; Smeltz 84'	Report; Summary	Muscat 19' (pen.); Allsopp 60'	Attendance: 14,421; Referee: Mark Shield

=== Round 2 ===
31 August 2007	Central Coast Mariners	3–0	Wellington Phoenix	Bluetongue Stadium, Gosford
20:00 UTC+10	Mrdja 9', 35'; Kwasnik 13'	Report; Summary		Attendance: 9,052; Referee: Peter Green

1 September 2007	Sydney FC	2–2	Adelaide United	Sydney Football Stadium, Sydney
17:00 UTC+10	Talay 13'; Brosque 74'	Report; Summary	Alagich 9'; Burns 76'	Attendance: 14,233; Referee: Mark Shield

1 September 2007	Melbourne Victory	0–0	Perth Glory	Telstra Dome, Melbourne
19:00 UTC+10		Report; Summary		Attendance: 31,545; Referee: Peter O'Leary

2 September 2007	Newcastle Jets	1–1	Queensland Roar	EnergyAustralia Stadium, Newcastle
17:00 UTC+10	J. Griffiths 89'	Report; Summary	Reinaldo 70'	Attendance: 13,144; Referee: Simon Przydacz

=== Round 3 ===
6 September 2007	Queensland Roar	0–1	Central Coast Mariners	Suncorp Stadium, Brisbane
20:00 UTC+10		Report; Summary	Kwasnik 55'	Attendance: 8,815; Referee: Mark Shield

7 September 2007	Adelaide United	1–1	Melbourne Victory	Hindmarsh Stadium, Adelaide
19:30 UTC+9:30	Dodd 83' (pen.)	Report; Summary	Vargas 80'	Attendance: 12,231; Referee: Peter Green

9 September 2007	Wellington Phoenix	0–1	Newcastle Jets	Westpac Stadium, Wellington
17:00 UTC+12		Report; Summary	Thompson 77'	Attendance: 11,478; Referee: Peter O'Leary

9 September 2007	Perth Glory	0–0	Sydney FC	Members Equity Stadium, Perth
15:00 UTC+8		Report; Summary		Attendance: 7,907; Referee: Craig Zetter

=== Round 4 ===
14 September 2007	Sydney FC	1–2	Wellington Phoenix	Sydney Football Stadium, Sydney
20:00 UTC+10	Casey 6'	Report; Summary	Felipè 8'; Daniel 29' (pen.)	Attendance: 11,491; Referee: Matthew Breeze

15 September 2007	Newcastle Jets	1–0	Adelaide United	EnergyAustralia Stadium, Newcastle
19:00 UTC+10	Bridge 81'	Report; Summary		Attendance: 13,627; Referee: Angelo Nardi

16 September 2007	Melbourne Victory	0–0	Central Coast Mariners	Telstra Dome, Melbourne
17:00 UTC+10		Report; Summary		Attendance: 27,351; Referee: Mark Shield

16 September 2007	Perth Glory	1–2	Queensland Roar	Members Equity Stadium, Perth
17:00 UTC+8	Harnwell 14'	Report; Summary	McCloughan 21'; McKay 84'	Attendance: 7,203; Referee: Ben Williams

=== Round 5 ===
21 September 2007	Newcastle Jets	2–2	Melbourne Victory	EnergyAustralia Stadium, Newcastle
20:00 UTC+10	A Griffiths 5'; Musialik 21'	Report; Summary	Thompson 65'; Caceres 83'	Attendance: 11,179; Referee: Matthew Breeze

22 September 2007	Wellington Phoenix	2–2	Adelaide United	Westpac Stadium, Wellington
19:00 UTC+12	Felipe 65'; Smeltz 87'	Report; Summary	Diego 70'; Djite 78'	Attendance: 12,127; Referee: Ben Williams

22 September 2007	Queensland Roar	0–1	Sydney FC	Suncorp Stadium, Brisbane
19:00 UTC+10		Report; Summary	Patrick 69'	Attendance: 16,582; Referee: Mark Shield

23 September 2007	Central Coast Mariners	1–0	Perth Glory	Bluetongue Stadium, Gosford
19:00 UTC+10	Petrovski 80'	Report; Summary		Attendance: 9,274; Referee: Craig Zetter

=== Round 6 ===
28 September 2007	Melbourne Victory	2–0	Queensland Roar	Telstra Dome, Melbourne
20:00 UTC+10	Muscat 68' (pen.); Thompson 85'	Report; Summary		Attendance: 25,622; Referee: Ben Williams

29 September 2007	Sydney FC	1–0	Newcastle Jets	Sydney Football Stadium, Sydney
19:00 UTC+10	Brosque 36'	Report; Summary		Attendance: 13,755; Referee: Craig Zetter

30 September 2007	Adelaide United	2–1	Central Coast Mariners	Hindmarsh Stadium, Adelaide
16:30 UTC+9:30	Djite 19', 88'	Report; Summary	Petrovski 37'	Attendance: 11,019; Referee: Matthew Breeze

30 September 2007	Wellington Phoenix	4–1	Perth Glory	Westpac Stadium, Wellington
17:00 UTC+12	R.Aloisi 14'; Smeltz 42'; Coveny 55'; Lochhead 83'	Report; Summary	Celeski 10'	Attendance: 10,127; Referee: Peter Green

=== Round 7 ===
5 October 2007	Queensland Roar	2–1	Wellington Phoenix	Suncorp Stadium, Brisbane
20:00 UTC+10	Zullo 4'; Kruse 45+1'	Report; Summary	Smeltz 90+5'	Attendance: 12,458; Referee: Craig Zetter

6 October 2007	Sydney FC	0–1	Melbourne Victory	Sydney Football Stadium, Sydney
19:00 UTC+10		Report; Summary	Allsopp 82'	Attendance: 18,436; Referee: Mark Shield

7 October 2007	Central Coast Mariners	1–1	Newcastle Jets	Bluetongue Stadium, Gosford
17:00 UTC+10	Pondeljak 62'	Report; Summary	Bridge 82'	Attendance: 12,622; Referee: Matthew Breeze

7 October 2007	Perth Glory	0–0	Adelaide United	Members Equity Stadium, Perth
17:00 UTC+8		Report; Summary		Attendance: 6,252; Referee: Peter Green

=== Round 8 ===
12 October 2007	Adelaide United	4–1	Melbourne Victory	Hindmarsh Stadium, Adelaide
19:30 UTC+9:30	Milicevic 14' (o.g.); Dodd 15', 54'; Pantelis 90+2'	Report; Summary	Thompson 45+2'	Attendance: 13,372; Referee: Mark Shield

12 October 2007	Perth Glory	3–3	Sydney FC	Members Equity Stadium, Perth
20:00 UTC+8	Harnwell 53'; Robinson 59'; Prentice 69'	Report; Summary	Brosque 40', 90+3'; Patrick 72'	Attendance: 6,876; Referee: Matthew Breeze

14 October 2007	Newcastle Jets	2–1	Wellington Phoenix	EnergyAustralia Stadium, Newcastle
15:00 UTC+10	Holland 17'; J. Griffiths 40'	Report; Summary	Old 90+4'	Attendance: 11,947; Referee: Ben Williams

14 October 2007	Central Coast Mariners	0–1	Queensland Roar	Bluetongue Stadium, Gosford
17:00 UTC+10		Report; Summary	McCloughan 5'	Attendance: 8,113; Referee: Peter O'Leary

=== Round 9 ===
19 October 2007	Newcastle Jets	1–1	Queensland Roar	EnergyAustralia Stadium, Newcastle
20:00 UTC+10	J. Griffiths 49' (pen.)	Report; Summary	Kruse 1'	Attendance: 12,326; Referee: Mark Shield

20 October 2007	Sydney FC	0–1	Adelaide United	Sydney Football Stadium, Sydney
19:00 UTC+10		Report; Summary	Pantelis 53'	Attendance: 12,922; Referee: Matthew Breeze

21 October 2007	Wellington Phoenix	1–2	Central Coast Mariners	Westpac Stadium, Wellington
17:00 UTC+12	Elrich 24'	Report; Summary	Heffernan 16'; Petrovski 90+1'	Attendance: 10,560; Referee: Peter Green

21 October 2007	Melbourne Victory	2–1	Perth Glory	Telstra Dome, Melbourne
16:30 UTC+10	Hernandez 24'; Thompson 34'	Report; Summary	Harnwell 42'	Attendance: 25,598; Referee: Simon Przydacz

=== Round 10 ===
26 October 2007	Melbourne Victory	0–2	Newcastle Jets	Telstra Dome, Melbourne
20:00 UTC+10		Report; Summary	A. Griffiths 8'; J. Griffiths 88'	Attendance: 27,123; Referee: Matthew Breeze

27 October 2007	Queensland Roar	3–3	Perth Glory	Suncorp Stadium, Brisbane
19:00 UTC+10	Marcinho 45+3'; Lynch 69' (pen.), 86'	Report; Summary	Moore 18' (o.g.); Harnwell 43'; Coyne 90+3'	Attendance: 16,715; Referee: Ben Williams

28 October 2007	Sydney FC	3–2	Central Coast Mariners	Sydney Football Stadium, Sydney
15:00 UTC+10	Brosque 16', 26'; Popovic 32'	Report; Summary	Hutchinson 27', 56'	Attendance: 17,652; Referee: Mark Shield

28 October 2007	Adelaide United	4–1	Wellington Phoenix	Hindmarsh Stadium, Adelaide
16:30 UTC+9:30	Giraldi 5'; Burns 45+4'; Pantelis 50'; Spagnuolo 75'	Report; Summary	Smeltz 3'	Attendance: 11,740; Referee: Simon Przydacz

=== Round 11 ===
2 November 2007	Adelaide United	0–1	Queensland Roar	Hindmarsh Stadium, Adelaide
19:30 UTC+10:30		Report; Summary	Reinaldo 63'	Attendance: 10,705; Referee: Peter Green

2 November 2007	Perth Glory	0–1	Wellington Phoenix	Members Equity Stadium, Perth
20:00 UTC+9		Report; Summary	Daniel 51'	Attendance: 7,105; Referee: Simon Przydacz

3 November 2007	Newcastle Jets	0–1	Sydney FC	EnergyAustralia Stadium, Newcastle
19:00 UTC+11		Report; Summary	Bridges 69'	Attendance: 16,433; Referee: Matthew Breeze

4 November 2007	Central Coast Mariners	2–1	Melbourne Victory	Bluetongue Stadium, Gosford
17:00 UTC+11	Petrovski 83'; Pondeljak 88'	Report; Summary	[ Hernández 77'	Attendance: 11,354; Referee: Mark Shield

=== Round 12 ===
9 November 2007	Newcastle Jets	1–4	Perth Glory	EnergyAustralia Stadium, Newcastle
20:00 UTC+11	J. Griffiths 49'	Report; Summary	Durante 25' (o.g.); J. Simpson 51'; Rukavytsya 63', 90+1'	Attendance: 8,112; Referee: Peter Green

10 November 2007	Central Coast Mariners	2–0	Adelaide United	Bluetongue Stadium, Gosford
17:00 UTC+11	J.Aloisi 48' (pen.), 59'	Report; Summary		Attendance: 11,680; Referee: Simon Przydacz

10 November 2007	Melbourne Victory	0–0	Sydney FC	Telstra Dome, Melbourne
19:00 UTC+11		Report; Summary		Attendance: 31,884; Referee: Mark Shield

11 November 2007	Queensland Roar	3–0	Wellington Phoenix	Suncorp Stadium, Brisbane
17:00 UTC+10	Reinaldo 67' (pen.), 79'; Marcinho 83'	Report; Summary		Attendance: 13,808; Referee: Matthew Breeze

=== Round 13 ===
16 November 2007	Queensland Roar	1–0	Melbourne Victory	Suncorp Stadium, Brisbane
19:00 UTC+10	Kruse 10'	Report; Summary		Attendance: 17,207; Referee: Ben Williams

17 November 2007	Wellington Phoenix	1–1	Sydney FC	Westpac Stadium, Wellington
19:00 UTC+12	R.Aloisi 29'	Report; Summary	Talay 90+3' (pen.)	Attendance: 8,062; Referee: Peter Green

18 November 2007	Adelaide United	1–1	Newcastle Jets	Hindmarsh Stadium, Adelaide
18:30 UTC+10:30	Dodd 76'	Report; Summary	J. Griffiths 70'	Attendance: 10,256; Referee: Matthew Breeze

18 November 2007	Perth Glory	0–1	Central Coast Mariners	Members Equity Stadium, Perth
19:00 UTC+9		Summary	Owens 13'	Attendance: 7,310; Referee: Craig Zetter

=== Round 14 ===
23 November 2007	Adelaide United	1–1	Perth Glory	Hindmarsh Stadium, Adelaide
19:30 UTC+10:30	Alagich 41'	Report; Summary	Harnwell 68'	Attendance: 10,678; Referee: Peter O'Leary

24 November 2007	Melbourne Victory	1–1	Wellington Phoenix	Telstra Dome, Melbourne
19:00 UTC+11	Allsopp 43'	Report; Summary	Lia 58'	Attendance: 20,938; Referee: Peter Green

25 November 2007	Newcastle Jets	0–0	Central Coast Mariners	EnergyAustralia Stadium, Newcastle
17:00 UTC+11		Report; Summary		Attendance: 14,169; Referee: Mark Shield

25 November 2007	Sydney FC	0–0	Queensland Roar	Sydney Football Stadium, Sydney
19:00 UTC+11		Report; Summary		Attendance: 16,569; Referee: Matthew Breeze

=== Round 15 ===
30 November 2007	Wellington Phoenix	1–2	Adelaide United	Westpac Stadium, Wellington
19:30 UTC+12	Daniel 69' (pen.)	Report; Summary	Agostino 9'; Pantelis 79'	Attendance: 18,345; Referee: Craig Zetter

30 November 2007	Queensland Roar	0–1	Newcastle Jets	Suncorp Stadium, Brisbane
19:00 UTC+10		Report; Summary	J. Griffiths 90+2'	Attendance: 14,193; Referee: Peter Green

22 December 2007	Central Coast Mariners	4–5	Sydney FC	Bluetongue Stadium, Gosford
19:00 UTC+11	Jedinak 3'; J.Aloisi 16'; Owens 63' (pen.); Kwasnik 86'	Report; Summary	Fyfe 33'; McFlynn 50'; Biddle 71'; Santalab 76'; Talay 90+5' (pen.)	Attendance: 17,514; Referee: Matthew Breeze

2 December 2007	Perth Glory	3–1	Melbourne Victory	Members Equity Stadium, Perth
17:00 UTC+9	Harnwell 18'; Rukavytsya 27', 46'	Report; Summary	Caceres 38'	Attendance: 8,030; Referee: Ben Williams

=== Round 16 ===
7 December 2007	Wellington Phoenix	3–0	Perth Glory	Westpac Stadium, Wellington
19:00 UTC+12	Smeltz 29' (pen.), 72'; Felipe 32'	Report; Summary		Attendance: 8,039; Referee: Strebre Delovski

7 December 2007	Sydney FC	1–0	Newcastle Jets	Sydney Football Stadium, Sydney
20:00 UTC+11	Corica 90+3'	Report; Summary		Attendance: 10,732; Referee: Matthew Breeze

8 December 2007	Melbourne Victory	2–2	Adelaide United	Telstra Dome, Melbourne
19:00 UTC+11	Muscat 71' (pen.); Alagich 90+2' (o.g.)	Report; Summary	Agostino 18', 50'	Attendance: 22,466; Referee: Peter Green

9 December 2007	Queensland Roar	2–1	Central Coast Mariners	Suncorp Stadium, Brisbane
18:00 UTC+10	Vidmar 21' (o.g.); McKay 28'	Report; Summary	J.Aloisi 13'	Attendance: 16,442; Referee: Ben Williams

=== Round 17 ===
14 December 2007	Wellington Phoenix	1–1	Queensland Roar	Westpac Stadium, Wellington
19:30 UTC+12	Smeltz 24'	Report; Summary	Reinaldo 5'	Attendance: 9,384; Referee: Ben Williams

14 December 2007	Adelaide United	1–2	Central Coast Mariners	Hindmarsh Stadium, Adelaide
19:30 UTC+10:30	Agostino 70'	Report; Summary	J.Aloisi 24'; Petrovski 48'	Attendance: 11,123; Referee: Peter Green

15 December 2007	Sydney FC	2–4	Perth Glory	Sydney Football Stadium, Sydney
19:00 UTC+11	Corica 50'; Bridges 90'	Report; Summary	Celeski 34', 35', 77' (pen.); Bertos 49'	Attendance: 12,402; Referee: Michael Hester

16 December 2007	Melbourne Victory	1–3	Newcastle Jets	Telstra Dome, Melbourne
17:00 UTC+11	Hernández 11'	Report; Summary	Denni 41'; J. Griffiths 54', 76'	Attendance: 22,626; Referee: Matthew Breeze

=== Round 18 ===
28 December 2007	Adelaide United	1–3	Sydney FC	Adelaide Oval, Adelaide
19:30 UTC+10:30	Sarkies 20'	Report; Summary	Santalab 44'; Corica 54'; Middleby 66'	Attendance: 25,039; Referee: Matthew Breeze

30 December 2007	Newcastle Jets	2–3	Wellington Phoenix	EnergyAustralia Stadium, Newcastle
19:00 UTC+11	Bridge 29' (pen.); Tunbridge 81'	Report; Summary	Smeltz 16'; Ferrante 49'; Rees 51'	Attendance: 15,107; Referee: Strebre Delovski

30 December 2007	Perth Glory	1–4	Queensland Roar	Members Equity Stadium, Perth
19:00 UTC+9	Rizzo 57'	Report; Summary	Kruse 34'; Reinaldo 42'; Minniecon 59'; McCloughan 74'	Attendance: 9,614; Referee: Peter Green

31 December 2007	Central Coast Mariners	2–5	Melbourne Victory	Bluetongue Stadium, Gosford
18:00 UTC+11	Jedinak 32'; J.Aloisi 63'	Report; Summary	Caceres 4'; Allsopp 23', 61'; Thompson 36'; Muscat 43' (pen.)	Attendance: 18,686; Referee: Mark Shield

=== Round 19 ===
4 January 2008	Wellington Phoenix	0–2	Sydney FC	Westpac Stadium, Wellington
19:30 UTC+12		Report; Summary	McFlynn 79'; Brosque 83'	Attendance: 14,288; Referee: Ben Williams

4 January 2008	Newcastle Jets	2–1	Adelaide United	EnergyAustralia Stadium, Newcastle
20:00 UTC+11	J. Griffiths 13'; Holland 73'	Report; Summary	Pantelis 41'	Attendance: 13,047; Referee: Peter Green

5 January 2008	Queensland Roar	1–2	Melbourne Victory	Suncorp Stadium, Brisbane
19:00 UTC+10	Marcinho 73'	Report; Summary	Allsopp 56'; Thompson 63'	Attendance: 21,475; Referee: Matthew Breeze

6 January 2008	Perth Glory	1–1	Central Coast Mariners	Members Equity Stadium, Perth
19:00 UTC+9	Rukavytsya 69'	Report; Summary	Hutchinson 38'	Attendance: 6,727; Referee: Strebre Delovski

=== Round 20 ===
11 January 2008	Melbourne Victory	3–0	Wellington Phoenix	Telstra Dome, Melbourne
20:00 UTC+11	Hernández 31'; Ward 35'; Patafta 88'	Report; Summary		Attendance: 25,489; Referee: Peter Green

12 January 2008	Central Coast Mariners	1–2	Newcastle Jets	Bluetongue Stadium, Gosford
19:00 UTC+11	Kwasnik 9'	Report; Summary	Holland 6'; J. Griffiths 52'	Attendance: 19,238; Referee: Matthew Breeze

13 January 2008	Queensland Roar	0–0	Sydney FC	Suncorp Stadium, Brisbane
18:00 UTC+10		Report; Summary		Attendance: 31,933; Referee: Mark Shield

13 January 2008	Perth Glory	3–2	Adelaide United	Members Equity Stadium, Perth
19:00 UTC+9	Robinson 12'; Rukavytsya 45+1'; Harnwell 62'	Report; Summary	Djité 8'; Dodd 59'	Attendance: 8,025; Referee: Ben Williams

=== Round 21 ===
18 January 2008	Newcastle Jets	2–1	Perth Glory	EnergyAustralia Stadium, Newcastle
20:00 UTC+11	J. Griffiths 22'; Bridge 64'	Report; Summary	Harnwell 45+2'	Attendance: 16,212; Referee: Michael Hester

19 January 2008	Central Coast Mariners	2–0	Wellington Phoenix	Bluetongue Stadium, Gosford
19:00 UTC+11	Aloisi 52'; Kwasnik 90+4'	Report; Summary		Attendance: 9,849; Referee: Kevin Docherty

20 January 2008	Sydney FC	2–2	Melbourne Victory	Sydney Football Stadium, Sydney
17:00 UTC+11	Corica 4'; Brosque 62'	Report; Summary	Milligan 46' (o.g.); Allsopp 76'	Attendance: 33,458; Referee: Peter O'Leary

20 January 2008	Adelaide United	2–0	Queensland Roar	Hindmarsh Stadium, Adelaide
18:30 UTC+10:30	Djite 18'; Pantelis 45'	Report; Summary		Attendance: 10,803; Referee: Strebre Delovski

== Finals series ==
Semifinals
2	Newcastle Jets	2	0	2
1	Central Coast Mariners	0	3	3
3	Sydney FC	0	0	0
4	Queensland Roar	0	2	2

Preliminary final
2	Newcastle Jets (a.e.t.)	3
4	Queensland Roar	2

Final
1	Central Coast Mariners	0
2	Newcastle Jets	1

=== Semi-finals ===
25 January 2008	Sydney FC	0–0	Queensland Roar	Sydney Football Stadium, Sydney
20:00 UTC+11		Report; Summary		Attendance: 23,450; Referee: Mark Shield

27 January 2008	Newcastle Jets	2–0	Central Coast Mariners	EnergyAustralia Stadium, Newcastle
18:00 UTC+11	A. Griffiths 22'; J. Griffiths 85' (pen.)	Report; Summary		Attendance: 22,960; Referee: Matthew Breeze

8 February 2008	Queensland Roar	2–0	Sydney FC	Suncorp Stadium, Brisbane
20:07 UTC+10 (Delayed Kickoff)	Reinaldo 13'; S. Ognenovski 84' (pen.)	Report; Summary		Attendance: 36,221; Referee: Mark Shield

10 February 2008	Central Coast Mariners	3–0 (a.e.t.)	Newcastle Jets	Bluetongue Stadium, Gosford
18:00 UTC+11	Kwasnik 37'; Petrovski 74', 95'	Summary		Attendance: 19,112; Referee: Ben Williams

=== Preliminary-final ===
17 February 2008	Newcastle Jets	3–2 (a.e.t.)	Queensland Roar	EnergyAustralia Stadium, Newcastle
18:00 UTC+11	Thompson 40'; J.Griffiths 104' (pen.); Elrich 111'	Report; Summary	Reinaldo 90+2' (pen.), 118' (pen.)	Attendance: 16,021; Referee: Peter Green

=== Grand Final ===
24 February 2008	Central Coast Mariners	0–1	Newcastle Jets	Sydney Football Stadium, Sydney
17:00 UTC+11		Summary	Mark Bridge 64'	Attendance: 36,354; Referee: Mark Shield

== Season statistics ==
=== Leading scorers ===
Total	Player		Team	Goals per Round																				
Total	Player		Team	1	2	3	4	5	6	7	8	9	10	11	12	13	14	15	16	17	18	19	20	21
12	(Australia)	Joel Griffiths	Newcastle Jets		1						1	1	1		1	1		1		2		1	1	1
9	(New Zealand)	Shane Smeltz	Wellington Phoenix	1				1	1	1			1						2	1	1			
8	(Australia)	Alex Brosque	Sydney FC		1				1		2		2									1		1
8	(Australia)	Jamie Harnwell	Perth Glory				1				1	1	1				1	1					1	1
7	(Australia)	Daniel Allsopp	Melbourne Victory	1						1							1				2	1		1
7	(Australia)	John Aloisi	Central Coast Mariners												2			1	1	1	1			1
6	(Australia)	Sasho Petrovski	Central Coast Mariners	1				1	1			1		1						1				
6	(Brazil)	Reinaldo	Queensland Roar		1									1	2					1	1			
6	(Australia)	Archie Thompson	Melbourne Victory					1	1		1	1									1	1		
6	(Australia)	Lucas Pantelis	Adelaide United								1	1	1					1				1		1

Goal scored from penalty kick

=== Attendance ===
The attendance records of each of the teams at the end of the home and away season, does not include finals series attendances.

Team	Hosted	Average	High	Low	Total
Melbourne Victory	10	26,064	31,884	20,938	260,642
Queensland Roar	11	16,951	31,933	8,815	186,456
Sydney FC	11	16,373	33,458	10,732	180,107
Newcastle Jets	11	13,209	16,433	8,112	145,303
Central Coast Mariners	10	12,741	19,238	8,113	127,409
Adelaide United	10	12,697	25,039	10,256	126,966
Wellington Phoenix	10	11,683	18,345	8,039	116,833
Perth Glory	11	7,596	9,614	6,252	83,557
League total	84	14,610	33,458	6,252	1,227,273

* Adelaide United played a one-off match at the Adelaide Oval against Sydney FC in their Round 18 match. This is why Adelaide United's Highest single attendance exceeds the capacity of Hindmarsh Stadium.

=== Top 10 attendances ===
Attendance	Round	Date	Home	Score	Away	Venue	Weekday	Time of Day
36,354	Grand Final	24 February 2008	Central Coast Mariners	0–1	Newcastle Jets	Sydney Football Stadium	Sunday	Day
36,221	Finals – Week 2	8 February 2008	Queensland Roar	2–0	Sydney FC	Suncorp Stadium	Friday	Night
33,458	Round 21	20 January 2008	Sydney FC	2–2	Melbourne Victory	Sydney Football Stadium	Sunday	Day
31,933	Round 20	13 January 2008	Queensland Roar	0–0	Sydney FC	Suncorp Stadium	Sunday	Twilight
31,884	Round 12	10 November 2007	Melbourne Victory	0–0	Sydney FC	Telstra Dome	Saturday	Night
31,545	Round 2	1 September 2007	Melbourne Victory	0–0	Perth Glory	Telstra Dome	Saturday	Night
27,351	Round 4	16 September 2007	Melbourne Victory	0–0	Central Coast Mariners	Telstra Dome	Sunday	Afternoon
27,123	Round 10	26 October 2007	Melbourne Victory	0–2	Newcastle Jets	Telstra Dome	Friday	Night
25,622	Round 6	28 September 2007	Melbourne Victory	2–0	Queensland Roar	Telstra Dome	Friday	Night
25,598	Round 9	21 October 2007	Melbourne Victory	2–1	Perth Glory	Telstra Dome	Sunday	Afternoon

=== Disciplinary ===
The Fair Play Award was awarded to Newcastle Jets, the team with the lowest points on the fair play ladder at the conclusion of the home and away season.

1 point	Yellow Card
2 points	Second Caution Red Card
3 points	Direct Red Card

Team	Yellow card	Yellow card Yellow card Red card	Red card	Points
Newcastle Jets	44	0	0	44
Perth Glory	34	1	3	45
Sydney FC	42	1	2	50
Queensland Roar	45	3	0	51
Wellington Phoenix	46	1	2	54
Adelaide United	45	3	1	54
Melbourne Victory	43	1	3	54
Central Coast Mariners	44	3	4	62
Totals	343	13	15	

== Awards ==
- The Premiers' Plate was awarded to Central Coast Mariners, who finished on top of the ladder after the regular season.
- The Championship Trophy was awarded to the Newcastle Jets.
- The Johnny Warren Medal was awarded to Joel Griffiths from the Newcastle Jets for the best player in the league.
- The Coach of the Year was awarded to Gary van Egmond of the Newcastle Jets.
- The Joe Marston Medal was awarded to Andrew Durante of Newcastle Jets.
- The Reebok Golden Boot was awarded to Joel Griffiths of Newcastle Jets (12 goals - regular season).
- The Rising Star award was awarded to Bruce Djite of Adelaide United.
- The Fair Play Award was awarded to the Newcastle Jets.

== See also ==
- 2007 Australian football code crowds
- Adelaide United season 2007-08
- Central Coast Mariners season 2007-08
- Melbourne Victory season 2007-08
- Newcastle United Jets season 2007-08
- Perth Glory season 2007-08
- Queensland Roar season 2007-08
- Sydney FC season 2007-08
- Wellington Phoenix season 2007-08
