= 2007–08 Melbourne Victory FC season =

Melbourne Victory
2007–08 season
- Manager: Ernie Merrick
- A-League: 5th
- Pre-Season Challenge Cup: 8th
- AFC Champions League: Group Stage (2nd)
- Top goalscorer: League: Daniel Allsopp (7); All: Daniel Allsopp (9)
- Highest home attendance: 31,884 vs Sydney FC (10 November 2007)
- Lowest home attendance: 14,558 vs Chonburi FC (21 May 2008)
- Average home league attendance: 24,439
Home colours	Away colours

== Season summary ==
Looking to capitalise on their successful 2006–07 campaign, Melbourne made some strong off-season signings including Costa Rican international Carlos Hernández to cover the hole left by the departure of Fred to MLS club D.C. United. Again with the league's largest crowds and a record membership of over 20,000, Melbourne were undefeated after 7 rounds but the season slipped away with some poor home performances and a mounting injury list. A late season rally gave Melbourne a hope of making the finals up to the second last round but they finished 5th, 4 points out of the finals.

== Players ==
=== First team squad ===
Note: Flags indicate national team as defined under FIFA eligibility rules; some limited exceptions apply. Players may hold more than one non-FIFA nationality.

No.	Pos.	Nation	Player
1	GK	AUS	Michael Theoklitos
2	MF	AUS	Kevin Muscat (captain)
3	DF	AUS	Daniel Piorkowski
5	DF	AUS	Ljubo Milicevic
6	DF	AUS	Steve Pantelidis
7	DF	AUS	Matthew Kemp
8	MF	SCO	Grant Brebner
9	FW	AUS	Daniel Allsopp
10	FW	AUS	Archie Thompson
11	DF	ENG	Joe Keenan
12	DF	AUS	Rodrigo Vargas

No.	Pos.	Nation	Player
13	MF	AUS	Kaz Patafta
14	MF	AUS	Adrian Caceres
15	FW	BRA	Leandro Love
16	MF	CRC	Carlos Hernández
17	MF	AUS	Daniel Vasilevski
18	MF	AUS	Leigh Broxham
19	MF	AUS	Evan Berger
20	GK	AUS	Eugene Galekovic
21	DF	AUS	Sebastian Ryall
30	GK	AUS	Mitchell Langerak

=== Transfers ===
In

Player	From	League	Date
(Australia) Mitchell Langerak	AIS	(Australia) VPL	23 February 2007
(Australia) Ljubo Milicevic	BSC Young Boys	(Switzerland) Swiss Super League	20 February 2007
(England) Joe Keenan	Willem II	(Netherlands) Eredivisie	30 March 2007
(Australia) Matthew Kemp	Adelaide United	(Australia) A-League	11 April 2007
(Australia) Evan Berger	Marconi Stallions	(Australia) NSWPL	29 May 2007
(Costa Rica) Carlos Hernández	LD Alajuelense	Primera División de Costa Rica	12 June 2007
(Australia) Kaz Patafta	Benfica	(Portugal) Portuguese Liga	20 June 2007
(Brazil) Leandro Love	Vissel Kobe	(Japan) J-League	25 July 2007
(Australia) Sebastian Ryall	AIS	(Australia) VPL	28 August 2007
(Australia) Steven Pace	Preston Lions	(Australia) VPL	30 October 2007
(Australia) Nick Ward	Queens Park Rangers	(England) Football League Championship	5 December 2007

Out

Player	To	League	Date
(Australia) Michael Ferrante	Wellington Phoenix	(Australia) A-League	1 March 2007
(Australia) Mark Byrnes	released	-	1 March 2007
(Brazil) Fred	D.C. United	(United States) MLS	30 March 2007
(England) James Robinson	Perth Glory	(Australia) A-League	17 March 2007
(Australia) Vince Lia	Wellington Phoenix	(Australia) A-League	21 March 2007
(Australia) Simon Storey	Partick Thistle F.C.	(Scotland) Scottish First Division	21 March 2007
(Australia) Kristian Sarkies	Adelaide United	(Australia) A-League	30 March 2007
(Australia) Adrian Leijer	Fulham F.C.	(England) Premier League	4 August 2007
(Australia) Eugene Galekovic	Adelaide United	(Australia) A-League	30 October 2007

== Matches ==
=== Pre-season matches ===
30 May 2007	Melbourne Victory (Australia)	1 : 4	(Italy) Juventus	Telstra Dome, Melbourne
				Attendance: 43,357

6 June 2007	Richmond Eagles (Australia)	0 : 1	(Australia) Melbourne Victory	Kevin Bartlett Reserve, Melbourne

13 June 2007	Oakleigh Cannons (Australia)	2 : 3	(Australia) Melbourne Victory	Jack Edwards Reserve, Melbourne

20 June 2007	South Melbourne (Australia)	1 : 5	(Australia) Melbourne Victory	Bob Jane Stadium, Melbourne

4 July 2007	China	1 : 0	(Australia) Melbourne Victory	Siu Sai Wan Sports Ground, Hong Kong

7 July 2007	Tianjin Teda (China)	1 : 1	(Australia) Melbourne Victory	TEDA Football Stadium, Tianjin
		(5–6 pen.)

- The match against China was played over three 30-minute periods.

=== 2007 Pre-Season Cup ===
Group A
Pos	Team	Pld	W	D	L	GF	GA	GD	BP	Pts
1	Adelaide United	3	1	2	0	6	3	+3	3	8
2	Perth Glory	3	2	1	0	4	2	+2	1	8
3	Newcastle Jets	3	1	0	2	2	5	−3	0	3
4	Melbourne Victory	3	0	1	2	2	4	−2	0	1

15 July 2007 Group Stage	Melbourne Victory	1 : 1	Adelaide United	Aurora Stadium, Launceston
				Attendance: 8,061

22 July 2007 Group Stage	Melbourne Victory	0 : 1	Newcastle Jets	Skilled Stadium, Geelong
				Attendance: 8,500

28 July 2007 Group Stage	Perth Glory	2 : 1	Melbourne Victory	Darwin Football Stadium, Darwin
				Attendance: 2,700

4 August 2007 Play-offs	Melbourne Victory	1 : 2	Wellington Phoenix	Olympic Park Stadium, Melbourne
				Attendance: 4,100

11 August 2007 Seventh Place Play-off	Melbourne Victory	0 : 1	Sydney FC	Olympic Park Stadium, Melbourne
				Attendance: 3,400

=== 2007-08 Hyundai A-League fixtures ===
25 August 2007 Round 1	Wellington Phoenix	2 : 2	Melbourne Victory	Westpac Stadium, Wellington
16:00 UTC+12	Daniel 79'; Smeltz 84'		Muscat 19' (pen.); Allsopp 60'	Attendance: 14,421; Referee: Mark Shield

1 September 2007 Round 2	Melbourne Victory	0 : 0	Perth Glory	Telstra Dome, Melbourne, Melbourne
19:00 UTC+10				Attendance: 31,545; Referee: Peter O'Leary

7 September 2007 Round 3	Adelaide United	1 : 1	Melbourne Victory	Hindmarsh Stadium, Adelaide
19:30 UTC+9:30	Dodd 83' (pen.)		Vargas 80'	Attendance: 13,231; Referee: Peter Green

16 September 2007 Round 4	Melbourne Victory	0 : 0	Central Coast Mariners	Olympic Park Stadium, Melbourne
17:00 UTC+10			Vidmar (red card) 90+2'	Attendance: 27,351; Referee: Mark Shield

21 September 2007 Round 5	Newcastle Jets	2 : 2	Melbourne Victory	EnergyAustralia Stadium, Newcastle
20:00 UTC+10	A Griffiths 5'; Musialik 21'		Thompson 65'; Caceres 83'	Attendance: 11,179; Referee: Matthew Breeze

28 September 2007 Round 6	Melbourne Victory	2 : 0	Queensland Roar	Telstra Dome, Melbourne
20:00 UTC+10	Muscat 68' (pen.); Thompson 85'			Attendance: 25,622; Referee: Ben Williams

6 October 2007 Round 7	Sydney FC	0 : 1	Melbourne Victory	Sydney Football Stadium, Sydney
19:00 UTC+10	Corica (red card) 25'		Allsopp 82'	Attendance: 18,436; Referee: Mark Shield

12 October 2007 Round 8	Adelaide United	4 : 1	Melbourne Victory	Hindmarsh Stadium, Adelaide
19:30 UTC+9:30	Milicevic 14' (o.g.); Dodd 15', 54'; Pantelis 90+2'		Thompson 45+2'	Attendance: 13,372; Referee: Mark Shield

21 October 2007 Round 9	Melbourne Victory	2 : 1	Perth Glory	Telstra Dome, Melbourne
16:30 UTC+10	Hernandez 24'; Thompson 34'		Harnwell 42'	Attendance: 25,598; Referee: Simon Przydacz

26 October 2007 Round 10	Melbourne Victory	0 : 2	Newcastle Jets	Telstra Dome, Melbourne
20:00 UTC+10	Pantelidis (red card) 66'		A. Griffiths 8'; J. Griffiths 88'	Attendance: 27,123; Referee: Matthew Breeze

4 November 2007 Round 11	Central Coast Mariners	2 : 1	Melbourne Victory	Bluetongue Stadium, Gosford
17:00 UTC+11	Petrovski 83', (yellow card) 73' (yellow-red card) 90'; Pondeljak 88'		Keenan (red card) 22'; Hernández 77'; Vargas (red card) 90'	Attendance: 11,354; Referee: Mark Shield

10 November 2007 Round 12	Melbourne Victory	0 : 0	Sydney FC	Telstra Dome, Melbourne
19:00 UTC+11				Attendance: 31,884; Referee: Mark Shield

16 November 2007 Round 13	Queensland Roar	1 : 0	Melbourne Victory	Suncorp Stadium, Brisbane
19:00 UTC+10	Kruse 10'			Attendance: 17,207; Referee: Ben Williams

24 November 2007 Round 14	Melbourne Victory	1 : 1	Wellington Phoenix	Telstra Dome, Melbourne
19:00 UTC+11	Muscat (yellow card) 34' (yellow-red card) 35'; Allsopp 43'		Lia 58'	Attendance: 20,938; Referee: Peter Green

2 December 2007 Round 15	Perth Glory	3 : 1	Melbourne Victory	Members Equity Stadium, Perth
17:00 UTC+9	Harnwell 18'; Rukavytsya 27' 46'		Caceres 38'	Attendance: 8,030; Referee: Ben Williams

8 December 2007 Round 16	Melbourne Victory	2 : 2	Adelaide United	Telstra Dome, Melbourne
19:00 UTC+11	Muscat 71' (pen.); Alagich 90+2' (o.g.)		Agostino 18' 50'	Attendance: 22,466; Referee: Peter Green

16 December 2007 Round 17	Melbourne Victory	1 : 3	Newcastle Jets	Telstra Dome, Melbourne
17:00 UTC+11	Hernández 11'		Denni 41'; J. Griffiths 54' 76'	Attendance: 22,626; Referee: Matthew Breeze

31 December 2007 Round 18	Central Coast Mariners	2 : 5	Melbourne Victory	Bluetongue Stadium, Gosford
18:00 UTC+11	Jedinak 32'; J.Aloisi 63'		Caceres 4'; Allsopp 23' 61'; Thompson 36'; Muscat 43' (pen.)	Attendance: 18,686; Referee: Mark Shield

5 January 2008 Round 19	Queensland Roar	1 : 2	Melbourne Victory	Suncorp Stadium, Brisbane
19:00 UTC+10	Marcinho 73'		Allsopp 56'; Thompson 63'	Attendance: 21,475; Referee: Matthew Breeze

11 January 2008 Round 20	Melbourne Victory	3 : 0	Wellington Phoenix	Telstra Dome, Melbourne
20:00 UTC+11	Hernández 31'; Ward 35'; Patafta 88'			Attendance: 25,489; Referee: Peter Green

20 January 2008 Round 21	Sydney FC	2 : 2	Melbourne Victory	Sydney Football Stadium, Sydney
17:00 UTC+11	Corica 4'; Brosque 62'	(Report) (Summary)	Milligan 46' (o.g.); Allsopp 76'	Attendance: 33,458; Referee: Peter O'Leary

== Ladder ==
Pos	Team	Pld	W	D	L	GF	GA	GD	Pts	Qualification
1	Central Coast Mariners	21	10	4	7	30	25	+5	34	Qualification for 2009 AFC Champions League group stage and Finals series (Note: First place qualifies for the 2009 AFC Champions League group stage. Winning the 2008 A-League Grand Final earns qualification for the 2009 AFC Champions League group stage, unless the Grand Final winners are also first place, in which case the Grand Final runner up qualifies.)
2	Newcastle Jets (C)	21	9	7	5	25	21	+4	34	Qualification for 2009 AFC Champions League group stage and Finals series
3	Sydney FC	21	8	8	5	28	24	+4	32	Qualification for 2008 Pan-Pacific Championship and Finals series
4	Queensland Roar	21	8	7	6	25	21	+4	31	Qualification for Finals series
5	Melbourne Victory	21	6	9	6	29	29	0	27	
6	Adelaide United	21	6	8	7	31	29	+2	26	
7	Perth Glory	21	4	8	9	27	34	−7	20	
8	Wellington Phoenix (Note: Wellington Phoenix cannot qualify for the AFC Champions League as they are not recognised as an AFC club.)	21	5	5	11	25	37	−12	20	

Source: ultimatealeague.com
Rules for classification: 1) points; 2) goal difference; 3) number of goals scored.
(C) Champions

== 2008 AFC Champions League ==
=== Warm-up matches ===
14 February 2008	Whittlesea Zebras (Australia)	1 : 3	(Australia) Melbourne Victory	Epping Stadium, Melbourne

26 February 2008	Melbourne Victory (Australia)	2 : 1	(Australia) Adelaide United	Olympic Park Stadium, Melbourne

4 March 2008	Adelaide United (Australia)	1 : 1	(Australia) Melbourne Victory	Hindmarsh Stadium, Adelaide

=== Matches ===
Pos	Team	Pld	W	D	L	GF	GA	GD	Pts	Qualification
1	(Japan) Gamba Osaka	6	4	2	0	14	8	+6	14	Advance to knockout stage
2	(Australia) Melbourne Victory	6	2	1	3	10	11	−1	7	
3	(South Korea) Chunnam Dragons	6	1	3	2	8	10	−2	6	
4	(Thailand) Chonburi	6	1	2	3	7	10	−3	5	

12 March 2008	Melbourne Victory (Australia)	2 : 0	(South Korea) Chunnam Dragons	Telstra Dome, Melbourne
				Attendance: 23,356

19 March 2008	Chonburi FC (Thailand)	3 : 1	(Australia) Melbourne Victory	Suphachalasai Stadium, Bangkok
				Attendance: 10,000

9 April 2008	Melbourne Victory (Australia)	3 : 4	(Japan) Gamba Osaka	Telstra Dome, Melbourne
				Attendance: 23,857

23 April 2008	Gamba Osaka (Japan)	2 : 0	(Australia) Melbourne Victory	Osaka Expo '70 Stadium, Suita
				Attendance: 8,132

7 May 2008	Chunnam Dragons (South Korea)	1 : 1	(Australia) Melbourne Victory	Gwang-Yang Stadium, Gwangyang
				Attendance: 3,000

21 May 2008	Melbourne Victory (Australia)	3 : 1	(Thailand) Chonburi FC	Telstra Dome, Melbourne
				Attendance: 9,558
