= 2007–08 Newcastle Jets FC season =

Newcastle United Jets FC
2007–08 season
- Owner: Con Constantine
- CEO: John Tsatsimas
- Manager: Gary van Egmond
- Top goalscorer: Joel Griffiths - 14
- Highest home attendance: 22,960 v Cen. Coast; 27 January 2008
- Lowest home attendance: 8,112 v Perth; 9 November 2007

The 2007–08 season was Newcastle Jets' third season in the Hyundai A-League and their most successful, placing second in the regular season, and defeating Central Coast Mariners in the Grand Final to be crowned the 2007–08 Champions.

== Players ==
=== Players ===
Note: Flags indicate national team as defined under FIFA eligibility rules; some limited exceptions apply. Players may hold more than one non-FIFA nationality.

No.	Pos.	Nation	Player
1	GK	AUS	Ante Covic (Vice-Captain)
2	DF	AUS	Adam Griffiths
3	DF	AUS	Jade North (Captain)
4	DF	AUS	Steve Eagleton (de-listed due to injury)
5	MF	AUS	Stuart Musialik
6	DF	AUS	Andrew Durante
7	FW	ARG	Jorge Drovandi
8	MF	AUS	Matt Thompson
9	FW	AUS	Joel Griffiths
10	MF	BRA	Denni
11	MF	AUS	Tarek Elrich (Youth)
12	DF	AUS	Paul Kohler
13	MF	AUS	Adam D'Apuzzo (Youth)
14	MF	AUS	Jobe Wheelhouse

No.	Pos.	Nation	Player
15	FW	AUS	Scott Tunbridge
16	DF	AUS	Craig Deans (de-listed due to injury)
17	MF	AUS	Troy Hearfield (Youth)
18	MF	AUS	Noel Spencer
19	FW	AUS	Mark Bridge
20	GK	AUS	Ben Kennedy (Youth)
21	FW	BRA	Mário Jardel (Marquee)
22	GK	AUS	Ben McNamara (Youth)
23	FW	AUS	Jason Hoffman (Youth)
25	MF	AUS	James Holland (Youth)
26	MF	AUS	Ben Kantarovski (Youth)
27	DF	AUS	Stephen Laybutt
28	MF	KOR	Song Jin-Hyung

=== Transfers ===
==== In ====
Name	Position	From (Club)	Date Joined	Debut
(Australia) Noel Spencer	Midfield	(Australia) Sydney FC	7 May 2007	Round 1
(Australia) Adam Griffiths	Defender	(England) Brentford	17 May 2007	Round 1
(Argentina) Jorge Drovandi	Forward	(Argentina) Rosario Central	2 August 2007	Round 1
(Brazil) Denni	Midfield	(Brazil) Santo André	17 August 2007	Round 1
(Australia) Scott Tunbridge	Forward	(Scotland) Hamilton Academical	4 July 2007	Round 11
(Brazil) Mário Jardel	Forward	(Cyprus) Anorthosis	13 August 2007	Round 4
(Australia) Ben McNamara	Goalkeeper	(Australia) Lake Macquarie City	18 August 2007	Uncapped
(Australia) Jason Hoffman	Forward	(Australia) Hamilton Olympic	30 August 2007	Round 2
(Australia) Stephen Laybutt	Defender	(Belgium) Gent	30 August 2007	Round 6
(Australia) James Holland	Midfield	(Australia) AIS	14 October 2007	Round 8
(Australia) Ben Kantarovski	Midfield	(Australia) Broadmeadow Magic	12 January 2008	Uncapped
(South Korea) Song Jin-Hyung	Midfield	(South Korea) FC Seoul	18 January 2008	Semi Final (2nd leg)

==== Out ====
Name	Position	To (Club)	Date Left
(Colombia) Milton Rodriguez	Forward	(Colombia) América de Cali	Start of season
(New Zealand) Tim Brown	Midfield	(Australia) Wellington Phoenix	Start of season
(Albania) Labinot Haliti	Forward	(Croatia) Slaven Belupo	Start of season
(Australia) Tony Faria	Midfield	(Australia) Marconi Stallions	Start of season
(Australia) Tolgay Özbey	Forward	(Australia) Blacktown City	Start of season
(New Zealand) Steven Old	Defender	(Australia) Wellington Phoenix	Start of season
(New Zealand) Vaughan Coveny	Forward	(Australia) Wellington Phoenix	Start of season
(Australia) Nick Carle	Midfield	(Turkey) Gençlerbirliği	Start of season
(Australia) Paul Okon	Defender	Retired	Start of season
(Australia) Ivan Necevski	Goalkeeper	(Australia) Sydney FC	Start of season
(Australia) Shane Webb	Defender	(Australia) Bankstown City Lions	Start of season
(Argentina) Jorge Drovandi	Forward	(Argentina) Aldosivi	4 December 2007

== Matches ==
=== 2007 Pre-season Cup ===
Group A
Pos	Team	Pld	W	D	L	GF	GA	GD	BP	Pts
1	Adelaide United	3	1	2	0	6	3	+3	3	8
2	Perth Glory	3	2	1	0	4	2	+2	1	8
3	Newcastle Jets	3	1	0	2	2	5	−3	0	3
4	Melbourne Victory	3	0	1	2	2	4	−2	0	1

14 July 2007 Group Stage	Newcastle Jets	0 : 1	Perth Glory	Port Macquarie Regional Stadium
14:30 UTC+10		Report	Harnwell 48'	Attendance: 2,700; Referee: James Lewis

22 July 2007 Group Stage	Melbourne Victory	0 : 1	Newcastle Jets	Skilled Stadium
14:00 UTC+10		Report	Wheelhouse 51'	Attendance: 8,500; Referee: Ben Williams

27 July 2007 Group Stage	Adelaide United	4 : 1	Newcastle Jets	Hindmarsh Stadium
19:30 UTC+9:30	Burns 6'; Djite 66'; Sarkies 80' (pen.); Alagich 86'	Report	Bridge (yellow card) 69' (yellow-red card); A. Griffiths (yellow card) 79' (yellow-red card); J. Griffiths 90+2' (pen.)	Attendance: 3,800; Referee: Craig Zetter

4 August 2007 Play-offs	Newcastle Jets	3 : 2	Sydney FC	Parramatta Stadium
19:30 UTC+10	J. Griffiths 5', 76'; Tunbridge 56'	Report	Zadkovich 79'; Talay 83'	Attendance: 2,611; Referee: Peter Green

10 August 2007 Finals	Wellington Phoenix	0 : 0 (a.e.t.)	Newcastle Jets	Westpac Stadium
19:30 UTC+12		(2-4 pen.); Report		Attendance: 5,174
	Penalties
	Smeltz (penalty missed); Aloisi (penalty scored); Christie (penalty scored); Johnson (penalty missed)		(penalty scored) J. Griffiths; (penalty scored) Bridge; (penalty scored) Thompson; (penalty scored) Elrich

=== 2007-08 Hyundai A-League fixtures ===
26 August 2007	Perth Glory	0 : 0	Newcastle Jets	Members Equity Stadium, Perth
15:00 UTC+8		Report; Summary		Attendance: 8,508; Referee: (Australia) Simon Przydacz

2 September 2007	Newcastle Jets	1 : 1	Queensland Roar	EnergyAustralia Stadium, Newcastle
17:00 UTC+10	J. Griffiths 89'	Report; Summary	Reinaldo 70'; McLaren (yellow card) 42' (yellow-red card) 85'	Attendance: 13,144; Referee: (Australia) Simon Przydacz

9 September 2007	Wellington Phoenix	0 : 1	Newcastle Jets	Westpac Stadium, Wellington
17:00 UTC+12		Report; Summary	Thompson 77'	Attendance: 11,478; Referee: (New Zealand) Peter O'Leary

15 September 2007	Newcastle Jets	1 : 0	Adelaide United	EnergyAustralia Stadium, Newcastle
19:00 UTC+10	Bridge 81'	Report; Summary		Attendance: 13,627; Referee: Angelo Nardi

21 September 2007	Newcastle Jets	2 : 2	Melbourne Victory	EnergyAustralia Stadium, Newcastle
20:00 UTC+10	A Griffiths 5'; Musialik 21'	Report; Summary	Thompson 65'; Caceres 83'	Attendance: 11,179; Referee: (Australia) Matthew Breeze

29 September 2007	Sydney FC	1 : 0	Newcastle Jets	Sydney Football Stadium, Sydney
19:00 UTC+10	Brosque 36'	Report; Summary		Attendance: 13,755; Referee: (Australia) Craig Zetter

7 October 2007	Central Coast Mariners	1 : 1	Newcastle Jets	Bluetongue Stadium, Gosford
17:00 UTC+10	Pondeljak 62'	Report; Summary	Bridge 82'	Attendance: 12,622; Referee: (Australia) Matthew Breeze

14 October 2007	Newcastle Jets	2 : 1	Wellington Phoenix	EnergyAustralia Stadium, Newcastle
15:00 UTC+10	Holland 17'; J. Griffiths 40'	Report; Summary	Old 90+4'	Attendance: 11,947; Referee: (Australia) Ben Williams

19 October 2007	Newcastle Jets	1 : 1	Queensland Roar	EnergyAustralia Stadium, Newcastle
20:00 UTC+10	J. Griffiths 49' (pen.)	Report; Summary	Kruse 1'	Attendance: 12,326; Referee: (Australia) Mark Shield

26 October 2007	Melbourne Victory	0 : 2	Newcastle Jets	Telstra Dome, Melbourne
20:00 UTC+10	Pantelidis (red card) 66'	Report; Summary	A. Griffiths 8'; J. Griffiths 88'	Attendance: 27,123; Referee: (Australia) Matthew Breeze

3 November 2007	Newcastle Jets	0 : 1	Sydney FC	EnergyAustralia Stadium, Newcastle
19:00 UTC+11		Report; Summary	Bridges 69'	Attendance: 16,433; Referee: (Australia) Matthew Breeze

9 November 2007	Newcastle Jets	1 : 4	Perth Glory	EnergyAustralia Stadium, Newcastle
20:00 UTC+11	J. Griffiths 49'	Report; Summary	Durante 25' (o.g.); J. Simpson 51'; Rukavytsya 63', 90+1'	Attendance: 8,112; Referee: (Australia) Peter Green

18 November 2007	Adelaide United	1 : 1	Newcastle Jets	Hindmarsh Stadium, Adelaide
18:30 UTC+10:30	Dodd 76'	Report; Summary	J. Griffiths 70'	Attendance: 10,256; Referee: (Australia) Matthew Breeze

25 November 2007	Newcastle Jets	0 : 0	Central Coast Mariners	EnergyAustralia Stadium, Newcastle
17:00 UTC+11		Report; Summary		Attendance: 14,169; Referee: (Australia) Mark Shield

30 November 2007	Queensland Roar	0 : 1	Newcastle Jets	Suncorp Stadium, Brisbane
19:00 UTC+10		Report; Summary	J. Griffiths 90+2'	Attendance: 14,193; Referee: (Australia) Peter Green

7 December 2007	Sydney FC	1 : 0	Newcastle Jets	Sydney Football Stadium, Sydney
20:00 UTC+11	Zadkovich (red card) 52'; Corica 90+3'	Report; Summary		Attendance: 10,732; Referee: (Australia) Matthew Breeze

16 December 2007	Melbourne Victory	1 : 3	Newcastle Jets	Telstra Dome, Melbourne
17:00 UTC+11	Hernández 11'	Report; Summary	Denni 41'; J. Griffiths 54', 76'	Attendance: 22,626; Referee: (Australia) Matthew Breeze

30 December 2007	Newcastle Jets	2 : 3	Wellington Phoenix	EnergyAustralia Stadium, Newcastle
19:00 UTC+11	Bridge 29' (pen.); Tunbridge 81'	Report; Summary	Smeltz 16'; Ferrante 49'; Rees 51'	Attendance: 15,107; Referee: (Australia) Strebre Delovski

4 January 2008	Newcastle Jets	2 : 1	Adelaide United	EnergyAustralia Stadium, Newcastle
20:00 UTC+11	J. Griffiths 13'; Holland 73'	Report; Summary	Pantelis 41'; Barbiero (yellow card) 18, 45+1' (yellow-red card)	Attendance: 13,047; Referee: (Australia) Peter Green

12 January 2008	Central Coast Mariners	1 : 2	Newcastle Jets	Bluetongue Stadium, Gosford
19:00 UTC+11	Kwasnik 9'	Report; Summary	Holland 6'; J. Griffiths 52'	Attendance: 19,238; Referee: (Australia) Matthew Breeze

18 January 2008	Newcastle Jets	2 : 1	Perth Glory	EnergyAustralia Stadium, Newcastle
20:00 UTC+11	J. Griffiths 22'; Bridge 64'	Report; Summary	Rizzo (red card) 37'; Harnwell 45+2'	Attendance: 16,212; Referee: (New Zealand) Michael Hester

=== 2007-08 Finals series ===
27 January 2008 Major SF Leg 1	Newcastle Jets	2 : 0	Central Coast Mariners	EnergyAustralia Stadium, Newcastle
18:00 UTC+11	A. Griffiths 22'; J. Griffiths 85' (pen.)	Report; Summary		Attendance: 22,960; Referee: (Australia) Matthew Breeze

10 February 2008 Major SF Leg 2	Central Coast Mariners	3 : 0 (a.e.t.)	Newcastle Jets	Bluetongue Stadium, Gosford
18:00 UTC+11	Kwasnik 37'; Petrovski 74', 95'	Summary		Attendance: 19,112; Referee: (Australia) Ben Williams

17 February 2008 Preliminary Final	Newcastle Jets	3 : 2 (a.e.t.)	Queensland Roar	EnergyAustralia Stadium, Newcastle
18:00 UTC+11	Thompson 40'; J.Griffiths 104' (pen.); Elrich 111'	Report; Summary	Reinaldo 90+2' (pen.), 118' (pen.); Moore (yellow card) 77' (yellow-red card) 112'	Attendance: 16,021; Referee: (Australia) Peter Green

24 February 2008 Grand Final	Central Coast Mariners	0 : 1	Newcastle Jets	Sydney Football Stadium, Sydney
17:00 UTC+11	Vukovic (red card) 90+5'	Summary	Bridge 64'	Attendance: 36,354; Referee: (Australia) Mark Shield

=== League table ===
Pos	Team	Pld	W	D	L	GF	GA	GD	Pts	Qualification
1	Central Coast Mariners	21	10	4	7	30	25	+5	34	Qualification for 2009 AFC Champions League group stage and Finals series (Note: First place qualifies for the 2009 AFC Champions League group stage. Winning the 2008 A-League Grand Final earns qualification for the 2009 AFC Champions League group stage, unless the Grand Final winners are also first place, in which case the Grand Final runner up qualifies.)
2	Newcastle Jets (C)	21	9	7	5	25	21	+4	34	Qualification for 2009 AFC Champions League group stage and Finals series
3	Sydney FC	21	8	8	5	28	24	+4	32	Qualification for 2008 Pan-Pacific Championship and Finals series
4	Queensland Roar	21	8	7	6	25	21	+4	31	Qualification for Finals series
5	Melbourne Victory	21	6	9	6	29	29	0	27	
6	Adelaide United	21	6	8	7	31	29	+2	26	
7	Perth Glory	21	4	8	9	27	34	−7	20	
8	Wellington Phoenix (Note: Wellington Phoenix cannot qualify for the AFC Champions League as they are not recognised as an AFC club.)	21	5	5	11	25	37	−12	20	

Source: ultimatealeague.com
Rules for classification: 1) points; 2) goal difference; 3) number of goals scored.
(C) Champions

== Statistics ==
=== Goal scorers ===
Name	Pre-Season	A-League	Finals
(Australia) Joel Griffiths	3	12	2
(Australia) Mark Bridge	0	4	1
(Australia) Adam Griffiths	0	2	1
(Australia) James Holland	0	3	0
(Australia) Scott Tunbridge	1	1	0
(Brazil) Denni	0	1	0
(Australia) Matt Thompson	0	1	1
(Australia) Stuart Musialik	0	1	0
(Australia) Jobe Wheelhouse	1	0	0
(Australia) Tarek Elrich	0	0	1
