= Danny Tiatto =

Australian soccer player

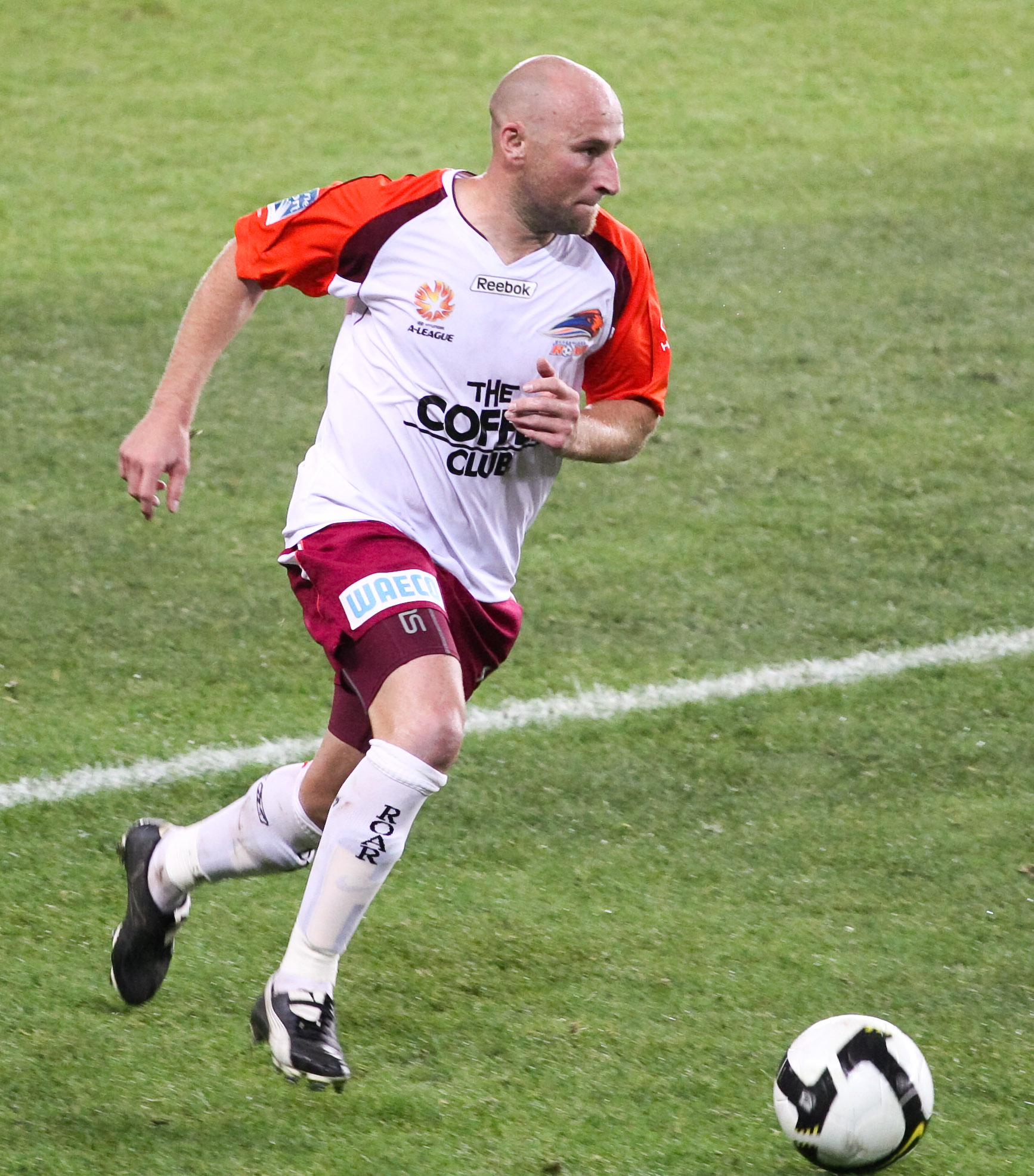
- Tiatto playing for Brisbane Roar in 2008.

Personal information
- Full name: Daniele Amadeo Tiatto
- Date of birth: 22 May 1973 (age 53)
- Place of birth: Werribee, Australia
- Height: 1.75 m (5 ft 9 in)
- Positions: Winger; left back

Youth career
- Bulleen Lions

Senior career*
Years	Team	Apps	(Gls)
1990–1991	Maribyrnong Polonia		
1992–1994	Bulleen Lions	38	(1)
1994–1996	Melbourne Knights	43	(3)
1996–1997	Salernitana	11	(1)
1997	Baden		
1998	→ Stoke City (loan)	15	(1)
1998–2004	Manchester City	139	(3)
2004–2007	Leicester City	73	(3)
2007–2010	Brisbane Roar	49	(2)
2010	Melbourne Knights	11	(0)
2011	St Albans Saints	2	(1)
2012	Werribee City	3	(0)
2013	Point Cook	10	(1)
Total		394	(16)

International career
1995–1996	Australia U23	17	(5)
1995–2005	Australia	23	(1)
Medal record
Representing Australia
Men's Association football
OFC Nations Cup
Winner	1996 Oceania
Winner	2000 Tahiti
- * Club domestic league appearances and goals

Daniele Amadeo Tiatto (born 22 May 1973) is an Australian former soccer player who played as a winger and left back.

He notably played for Manchester City joining the club in 1998 whilst the club were playing in the third level of English football, he was promoted three times with City in his six years with the club and would go on to play in the Premier League for them. He also played in England for Leicester City and Stoke City, and took in spells in Europe with Salernitana and FC Baden. In his native country he has played for Bulleen Lions, Melbourne Knights, Brisbane Roar, St Albans Saints, Werribee City and Point Cook. He was capped 23 times by Australia scoring a single goal.

== Club career ==
=== Early years ===
Tiatto commenced his senior career with Bulleen in the Victorian Premier League (VPL), eventually impressing enough to secure a move to the National Soccer League with Melbourne Knights. There he signalled his ability as a dashing left winger, helping the Knights in their golden era as they claimed back-to-back championships. In 1996, he joined Salernitana of the Italian Serie B on a temporary basis, but did not earn a permanent contract. A spell at Swiss club FC Baden followed, before Tiatto moved to the English club Stoke City on loan on 25 November 1997. He played 15 times for Stoke in 1997–98 scoring once which came in a 2–1 defeat at home to Huddersfield Town on 7 March 1998.

=== Manchester City ===
In the summer of 1998 Tiatto was signed by Manchester City for a fee of £300,000. Tiatto struggled to hold down a first team place during his first season at Manchester City, partially due to indiscipline. The next season was more successful for Tiatto, making 35 appearances as Manchester City gained promotion to the Premiership. The 2000–01 season saw Manchester City relegated, however, Tiatto performed well for the struggling club leading to speculation he would move on to another Premiership team. He also won Manchester City's Player of the Year award for the season. The 2001–02 season saw Tiatto again form part of a promotion winning side. On the return to the top division Tiatto again found his first team opportunities limited. A sending off against Blackburn Rovers six minutes after coming on a substitute resulted in a long exile from the first team. Injuries also restricted appearances, with Tiatto making just 13 starts in the final two years of his time at Manchester City. Tiatto signed for Leicester City on a two-year deal in the summer of 2004, after his contract Manchester City expired.

=== Leicester City ===
Usually employed as a left-winger for Leicester City, Tiatto played anywhere down the left side, or in central midfield. He was a firm favourite with Leicester City fans and he was voted Leicester's 2005 Player of the Season by supporters. However, Tiatto had a bad season in the 2005–06 season, mainly due to indiscipline and injury.

Tiatto was the Leicester City club captain, having taken over the armband from Matt Elliott when the Scottish defender retired in 2005, before losing it to Paddy McCarthy at the end of the 2005–06 season.

=== Brisbane Roar ===
In February 2007, Tiatto signed a pre-contract agreement with Brisbane Roar FC in the Hyundai A-League for the 2007–08 season. On 1 July, Tiatto made his debut for the Roar coming on as a substitute against South African team Supersport United. Tiatto featured prominently in his sides two all draw against Adelaide United in Round One of the 2007–08 A-League season. However Tiatto was subsequently cited after the match for serious conduct relating to an ugly incident with Adelaide United defender Richie Alagich, and received a two match suspension.

During round 21, Tiatto scored his first goal for Brisbane Roar with a superb strike against Perth Glory. Soon after he threw his support behind axed keeper Liam Reddy to return in place of stand-in keeper Griffin McMaster for the A-League finals. He has been released from the Roar.

=== Melbourne Knights ===
After having a falling out with Roar coach Ange Postecoglou, Tiatto was sacked from Brisbane. However, in 2010, he signed a one-year deal with VPL club Melbourne Knights, the club he played for before moving overseas. He later played for St Albans Saints and Werribee City.

== International career ==
Tiatto won 25 caps for the Australian national team (scoring 1 goal) before his retirement from international football in October 2005. He also represented Australia at under 23 level when he played at the 1996 Summer Olympics.

== Career statistics ==
=== Club ===
Club	Season	League			FA Cup		League Cup		Other^{[A]}		Total	
Club	Season	Division	Apps	Goals	Apps	Goals	Apps	Goals	Apps	Goals	Apps	Goals
Bulleen Lions	1992	Victoria Premier League	2	0	—		—		—		2	0
Bulleen Lions	1993	Victoria Premier League	13	0	—		—		—		13	0
Bulleen Lions	1994	Victoria Premier League	23	1	—		—		—		23	1
Bulleen Lions	Total		38	1	—		—		—		38	1
Melbourne Knights	1994–95	National Soccer League	25	3	—		—		—		25	3
Melbourne Knights	1996–97	National Soccer League	18	0	—		—		—		18	0
Melbourne Knights	Total		43	3	—		—		—		43	3
Salernitana	1996–97	Serie B	11	1	—		—		—		11	1
Stoke City	1997–98	First Division	15	1	0	0	0	0	0	0	15	1
Manchester City	1998–99	Second Division	17	1	0	0	1	1	1	0	19	2
Manchester City	1999–2000	First Division	35	0	0	0	3	0	0	0	38	0
Manchester City	2000–01	Premier League	33	2	2	0	4	0	0	0	39	2
Manchester City	2001–02	First Division	37	1	1	0	2	0	0	0	40	1
Manchester City	2002–03	Premier League	13	0	0	0	0	0	0	0	13	0
Manchester City	2003–04	Premier League	5	0	0	0	0	0	4	0	9	0
Manchester City	Total		140	3	3	0	10	1	5	0	158	4
Leicester City	2004–05	Championship	30	1	3	0	1	0	0	0	34	1
Leicester City	2005–06	Championship	18	1	0	0	3	0	0	0	21	1
Leicester City	2006–07	Championship	25	1	2	0	1	0	0	0	28	1
Leicester City	Total		73	3	5	0	5	0	0	0	83	3
Brisbane Roar	2007–08	A-League	15	0	—		—		—		15	0
Brisbane Roar	2008–09	A-League	20	1	—		—		—		20	1
Brisbane Roar	2009–10	A-League	14	1	—		—		—		14	1
Brisbane Roar	Total		49	2	—		—		—		49	2
Melbourne Knights	2010	Victoria Premier League	11	0	—		—		—		11	0
St Albans Saints	2011	Victoria Premier League	2	1	—		—		—		2	1
Werribee City	2012	Victorian State League Division 1	3	0	—		—		—		3	0
Career Total			384	16	9	0	15	1	5	0	413	17

A. The "Other" column constitutes appearances and goals in the Football League Trophy (1998) and the UEFA Cup (2003).

=== International ===
Australia national team
Year	Apps	Goals
1995	3	0
1996	3	0
1997	1	0
1998	0	0
1999	2	0
2000	11	1
2001	1	0
2002	0	0
2003	1	0
2004	2	0
2005	1	0
Total	25	1

== Honours ==
=== Player ===
Melbourne Knights

- NSL Championship: 1994–95, 1995–96

Manchester City

- Football League First Division: 2001–02

Australia

- OFC Nations Cup: 1996, 2000

Individual

- Queensland Roar Member's Player of the Year: 2007–08
