= 2007–08 Adelaide United FC season =

Adelaide United
2007–08 season
- Chairman: Mel Patzwald
- Manager: Aurelio Vidmar
- A-League: 6th
- Pre-Season Cup: Champions
- AFC Champions League: Group stages
- Highest home attendance: 25,039 (vs Sydney FC, 28 December 2007)
- Lowest home attendance: 10,256 (vs Newcastle Jets, 18 November 2007)
- Average home league attendance: 12,697
- Biggest win: 4–1 (Melbourne Victory)
- Biggest defeat: 2–0 (Central Coast Mariners)
Home colours	Away colours

The 2007–08 Adelaide United FC season was the club's third season since the inception of the A-League. The club competed in the 2007–08 A-League and finished sixth on the ladder.

For the 2007–08 season Adelaide recruited ex-Socceroo Paul Agostino "marquee", Ivorian Jonas Salley and ex-Olyroo Kristian Sarkies. They also signed Issy Erdogan of Preston Lions. One of the success stories of the season was the signing of former Flamengo FC player Cássio on a free transfer from Brazilian club. Cássio, who joined from Santa Cruz FC, won the Club Champion award in his first season. Shaun Ontong and Matthew Mullen from the AIS, were also signed to replenish their defensive stocks after the departure of Kristian Rees, Adam van Dommele and Aaron Goulding.

The 2007–08 season was a season to forget for Adelaide as they battled a huge amount of player injury throughout the season. This effectively ended their finals hopes and it was the first time Adelaide had failed to make the top two in A-League history.

Adelaide United participated in the 2008 AFC Champions League after finishing runner-up in the 2006–07 regular season and finals series to Melbourne Victory. Adelaide was drawn into Group E, along with V-League and Super Cup winners Bình Dương F.C., CSL champions Changchun Yatai, and K-League winners Pohang Steelers.

In their opening match of the 2008 campaign, Adelaide United defeated Pohang 2–0 in Korea. United drew against Changchun 0–0 in their second game, defeated Bình Dương 2–1 in Vietnam and followed this up with a 4–1 victory in the return leg. In their final group tie at home, Adelaide defeated Pohang 1–0, setting up a deciding away tie against Changchun to determine the Group E winner. In Changchun, Adelaide withstood considerable pressure to achieve an historic 0–0 draw, thus becoming the first Australian team to ever progress to the knockout stage of the Asian Champions League.

Adelaide drew J-League and Emperor's Cup champions Kashima Antlers in a two legged quarter-final starting in Japan, where they managed a 1–1 draw. Adelaide captain Travis Dodd scored first in the opening half, but right before halftime the score levelled when Robert Cornthwaite scored an own goal. In the return leg at the Hindmarsh Stadium a week later, Adelaide became the first Australian team to progress to the semi-finals of the competition with a 1–0 win. Cornthwaite redeemed himself from his own goal in the first leg by scoring the only goal of the game midway through the second half.

Adelaide drew 2007 Uzbek League Runners-up FC Bunyodkor in the semi-final, after the Uzbeks knocked out Saipa F.C. in their quarter-final. In the first leg of the semi-final, Adelaide won 3–0 with Diego, Barbiero, and Cristiano (via a penalty) scoring. The match was witnessed by 16,998 fans at Hindmarsh Stadium.

In the second leg of the semi-finals Adelaide United lost 1–0 to FC Bunyodkor but went through to the final 3–1 on aggregate. Thus they became the first Australian team to make it to the final of Asia's premier club competition. In the two legged final, they took on Japanese team Gamba Osaka who deposed 2007 champions Urawa Red Diamonds in the other semi-final.

This result ensured that Adelaide would participate in the 2008 FIFA Club World Cup either as the AFC representatives or as the highest placed non-Japanese team – as the rules do not allow more than one Japanese team to participate.

Adelaide lost heavily over two legs to Gamba Osaka. The score was 3–0 to Gamba Osaka away and 2–0 to Osaka at home in Adelaide, the Japanese club winning 5–0 on aggregate.

== Players ==
Note: Flags indicate national team as defined under FIFA eligibility rules; some limited exceptions apply. Players may hold more than one non-FIFA nationality.

No.	Pos.	Nation	Player
1	GK	AUS	Daniel Beltrame
2	DF	AUS	Robert Cornthwaite
4	DF	AUS	Angelo Costanzo
5	DF	AUS	Michael Valkanis (captain)
6	DF	BRA	Cássio
7	MF	AUS	Lucas Pantelis
8	MF	AUS	Kristian Sarkies
9	FW	AUS	Paul Agostino
13	MF	AUS	Travis Dodd
15	MF	CIV	Jonas Salley
17	DF	AUS	Isyan Erdoğan
18	MF	AUS	Fabian Barbiero

No.	Pos.	Nation	Player
20	GK	AUS	Eugene Galeković
21	MF	AUS	Jason Spagnuolo
22	MF	BRA	Diego
28	MF	AUS	Rostyn Griffiths
—	DF	AUS	Richie Alagich
—	FW	AUS	Bruce Djite
—	FW	AUS	Nathan Burns
—	MF	AUS	Shaun Ontong
—	DF	AUS	Milan Susak
—	MF	NED	Bobby Petta
—	FW	AUS	Dez Giraldi
—	GK	AUS	Robert Bajic

== Transfers ==
=== Transfers in ===
Name	Position	Moving from
(Australia) Paul Agostino	Forward	TSV 1860 München
(Ivory Coast) Jonas Salley	Midfield	New Zealand Knights
(Australia) Kristian Sarkies	Forward	Melbourne Victory
(Brazil) Cássio	Defender	Santa Cruz
(Australia) Shaun Ontong	Defender	AIS
(Australia) Matthew Mullen	Midfield	AIS
(Australia) Isyan Erdogan	Defender	Preston Lions
(Australia) Milan Susak	Defender	FK Vojvodina
(Australia) Eugene Galekovic	Goalkeeper	Melbourne Victory

=== Transfers out ===
Name	Position	Moving to
(Australia) Greg Owens	Midfield	Central Coast Mariners
(Australia) Ross Aloisi	Midfield	Wellington Phoenix
(Australia) Matthew Kemp	Defender	Melbourne Victory
(China) Shengqing Qu	Forward	released
(Australia) Carl Veart	Forward	retired
(Brazil) Fernando	Forward	released
(Australia) Kristian Rees	Defender	Whittlesea Zebras
(Australia) Aaron Goulding	Defender	released
(Australia) Adam van Dommele	Defender	South Melbourne

== Goal scorers ==
Total	Player		Goals per Round																				
Total	Player		1	2	3	4	5	6	7	8	9	10	11	12	13	14	15	16	17	18	19	20	21
6	(Australia)	Bruce Djite	1				1	2				1											1
5	(Australia)	Travis Dodd			1					2					1							1	
5	(Australia)	Lucas Pantelis								1	1						1				1		1
4	(Australia)	Nathan Burns	1	1								1										1	
4	(Australia)	Paul Agostino															1	2	1				
2	(Australia)	Richie Alagich		1												1							
1	(Brazil)	Diego					1																
1	(Australia)	Kristian Sarkies																		1			

A goal was scored from a penalty kick

== Competitions ==
=== Pre-season ===
Round	Date	Home team	Score	Away team	Crowd	Stadium	Match Details
1	15 July 2007	Melbourne Victory	1–1	Adelaide United	8,061	Aurora Stadium	Report
2	20 July 2007	Adelaide United	1–1	Perth Glory	3,513	Hindmarsh Stadium	Report
3	27 July 2007	Adelaide United	4–1	Newcastle Jets	3,800	Hindmarsh Stadium	Report
Playoff	5 August 2007	Adelaide United	3–2	Queensland Roar	5,221	Hindmarsh Stadium	Report
Grand Final	12 August 2007	Adelaide United	2–1	Perth Glory	9,606	Hindmarsh Stadium	Report

=== A-League ===
==== League table ====
Pos	Team	Pld	W	D	L	GF	GA	GD	Pts	Qualification
1	Central Coast Mariners	21	10	4	7	30	25	+5	34	Qualification for 2009 AFC Champions League group stage and Finals series (Note: First place qualifies for the 2009 AFC Champions League group stage. Winning the 2008 A-League Grand Final earns qualification for the 2009 AFC Champions League group stage, unless the Grand Final winners are also first place, in which case the Grand Final runner up qualifies.)
2	Newcastle Jets (C)	21	9	7	5	25	21	+4	34	Qualification for 2009 AFC Champions League group stage and Finals series
3	Sydney FC	21	8	8	5	28	24	+4	32	Qualification for 2008 Pan-Pacific Championship and Finals series
4	Queensland Roar	21	8	7	6	25	21	+4	31	Qualification for Finals series
5	Melbourne Victory	21	6	9	6	29	29	0	27	
6	Adelaide United	21	6	8	7	31	29	+2	26	
7	Perth Glory	21	4	8	9	27	34	−7	20	
8	Wellington Phoenix (Note: Wellington Phoenix cannot qualify for the AFC Champions League as they are not recognised as an AFC club.)	21	5	5	11	25	37	−12	20	

Source: ultimatealeague.com
Rules for classification: 1) points; 2) goal difference; 3) number of goals scored.
(C) Champions

==== Matches ====
Round	Date	Home team	Score	Away team	Crowd	Stadium	Match Details
1	25 August 2007	Queensland Roar	2–2	Adelaide United	16,828	Suncorp Stadium	Report; Summary
2	1 September 2007	Sydney FC	2–2	Adelaide United	14,233	Sydney Football Stadium	Report; Summary
3	7 September 2007	Adelaide United	1–1	Melbourne Victory	12,231	Hindmarsh Stadium	Report; Summary
4	15 September 2007	Newcastle Jets	1–0	Adelaide United	13,627	EnergyAustralia Stadium	Report; Summary
5	22 September 2007	Wellington Phoenix	2–2	Adelaide United	12,127	Westpac Stadium	Report; Summary
6	30 September 2007	Adelaide United	2–1	Central Coast Mariners	11,019	Hindmarsh Stadium	Report; Summary
7	7 October 2007	Perth Glory	0–0	Adelaide United	6,252	Members Equity Stadium	Report; Summary
8	12 October 2007	Adelaide United	4–1	Melbourne Victory	13,372	Hindmarsh Stadium	Report; Summary
9	20 October 2007	Sydney FC	0–1	Adelaide United	12,922	Sydney Football Stadium	Report; Summary
10	28 October 2007	Adelaide United	4–1	Wellington Phoenix	11,740	Hindmarsh Stadium	Report; Summary
11	2 November 2007	Adelaide United	0–1	Queensland Roar	10,705	Hindmarsh Stadium	Report; Summary
12	10 November 2007	Central Coast Mariners	2–0	Adelaide United	11,680	Bluetongue Stadium	Report; Summary
13	18 November 2007	Adelaide United	1–1	Newcastle Jets	10,256	Hindmarsh Stadium	Report; Summary
14	23 November 2007	Adelaide United	1–1	Perth Glory	10,678	Hindmarsh Stadium	Report; Summary
15	30 November 2007	Wellington Phoenix	1–2	Adelaide United	18,345	Westpac Stadium	Report; Summary
16	8 December 2007	Melbourne Victory	2–2	Adelaide United	22,466	Telstra Dome	Report; Summary
17	14 December 2007	Adelaide United	1–2	Central Coast Mariners	11,123	Hindmarsh Stadium	Report; Summary
18	28 December 2007	Adelaide United	1–3	Sydney FC	25,039	Adelaide Oval	Report; Summary
19	4 January 2008	Newcastle Jets	2–1	Adelaide United	13,047	EnergyAustralia Stadium	Report; Summary
20	13 January 2008	Perth Glory	3–2	Adelaide United	8,025	Members Equity Stadium	Report; Summary
21	20 January 2008	Adelaide United	2–0	Queensland Roar	10,803	Hindmarsh Stadium	Report; Summary

=== AFC Champions League ===
==== Group stage ====
Pos	Team	Pld	W	D	L	GF	GA	GD	Pts	Qualification
1	(Australia) Adelaide United	6	4	2	0	9	2	+7	14	Advance to knockout stage
2	(China) Changchun Yatai	6	3	3	0	10	3	+7	12	
3	(South Korea) Pohang Steelers	6	1	2	3	6	7	−1	5	
4	(Vietnam) Bình Dương	6	0	1	5	4	17	−13	1	

Round	Date	Home team	Score	Away team	Attendance	Stadium
1	12 March 2008	Pohang Steelers	0 – 2 Cornthwaite 3'; Djite 59'	Adelaide United	8,436	Steelyard Stadium
2	19 March 2008	Adelaide United	0–0	Changchun Yatai	10,510	Hindmarsh Stadium
3	9 April 2008	Bình Dương	1 – 2 Diego 10'; Alagich 78'	Adelaide United	15,000	Gò Đậu Stadium
4	23 April 2008	Adelaide United	4 – 1 Pantelis 56'; Dodd 58', 62'; Diego 77'	Bình Dương	13,802	Hindmarsh Stadium
5	7 May 2008	Adelaide United	1 – 0 Diego 63'	Pohang Steelers	11,805	Hindmarsh Stadium
6	22 May 2008	Changchun Yatai	0–0	Adelaide United	20,000	Changchun City Stadium

==== Knockout stage ====
Final	Date	Home team	Score	Away team	Attendance	Stadium
Quarter (1)	17 September 2008	Kashima Antlers	1 – 1 Dodd 38'	Adelaide United	7,004	Kashima Soccer Stadium
Quarter (2)	24 September 2008	Adelaide United	1 – 0 Cornthwaite 73'	Kashima Antlers	16,965	Hindmarsh Stadium
Semi (1)	8 October 2008	Adelaide United	3 – 0 Diego 57'; Barbiero 70'; Cristiano 89' (pen.)	Bunyodkor	16,998	Hindmarsh Stadium
Semi (2)	22 October 2008	Bunyodkor	1–0	Adelaide United	17,000	MHSK Stadium
Grand (1)	5 November 2008	Gamba Osaka	3–0	Adelaide United	20,639	Osaka Expo '70 Stadium
Grand (2)	12 November 2008	Adelaide United	0–2	Gamba Osaka	17,000	Hindmarsh Stadium
