= Cássio (footballer, born January 1980) =

Australian football manager and former player

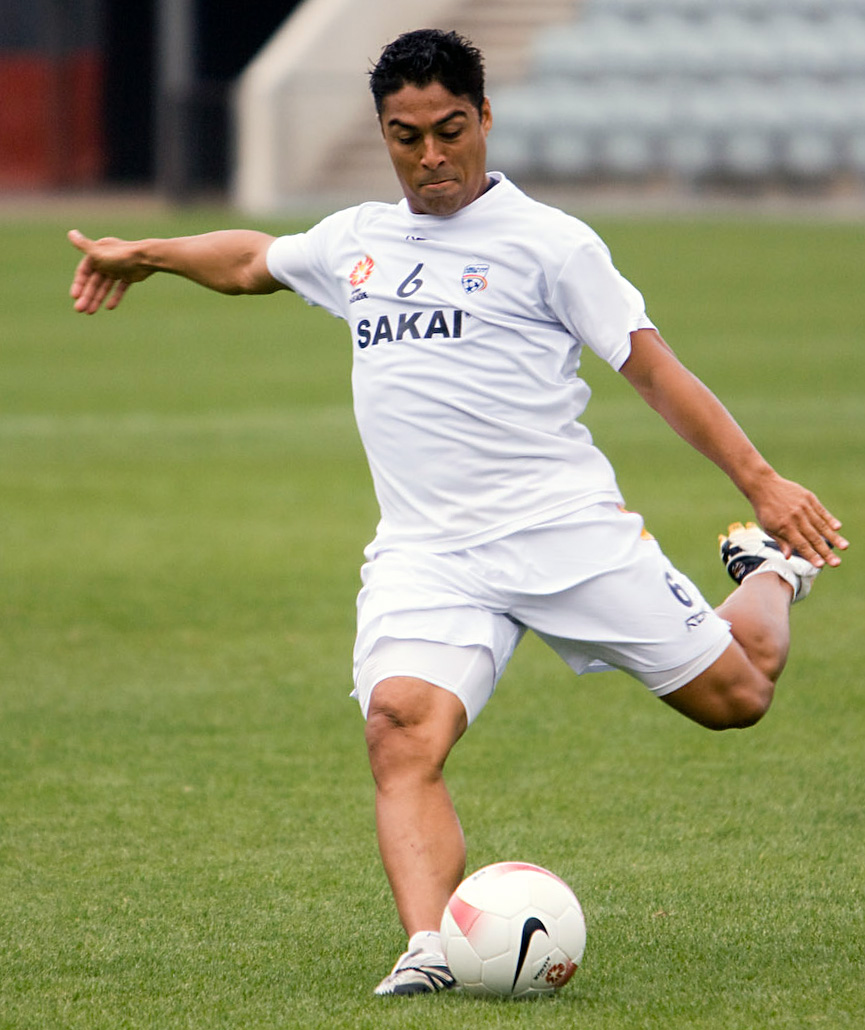
- Cássio training with Adelaide United in 2007

Personal information
- Full name: Cássio José de Abreu Oliveira
- Date of birth: 8 January 1980 (age 46)
- Place of birth: Rio de Janeiro, Brazil
- Height: 1.68 m (5 ft 6 in)
- Position: Left back

Youth career
- Flamengo

Senior career*
Years	Team	Apps	(Gls)
2000–2004	Flamengo	96	(3)
2002	→ Internacional (loan)	44	(1)
2003	→ Atlas (loan)	0	(0)
2004	Olimpia	16	(1)
2005	New England Revolution	3	(0)
2005–2006	Ceará	22	(2)
2005	→ Brasiliense (loan)	7	(0)
2006–2007	Santa Cruz	14	(0)
2007–2014	Adelaide United	158	(11)
Total		360	(18)
- * Club domestic league appearances and goals as of 5 December 2013

Cássio José de Abreu Oliveira (born 8 January 1980), simply known as Cássio, is a former Brazilian-born Australian professional football player who last played for Adelaide United in the A-League.

== Biography ==
Cássio began playing as a left back with local side Flamengo. After missing a penalty kick in the 2001 Copa Mercosur final, his career with Flamengo was effectively over and he was loaned to Internacional and Mexican Primera División side Atlas in 2002 and 2003. While at Internacional, Cássio won the 2002 Campeonato Gaúcho and scored the club's 1000th goal in Brazilian competitions. He played in Série B with Marília during the first half of 2004, before joining Primera División Paraguaya side Olimpia in July 2004. He had a brief spell with the New England Revolution, making only three appearances before being released midway through the 2005 season.

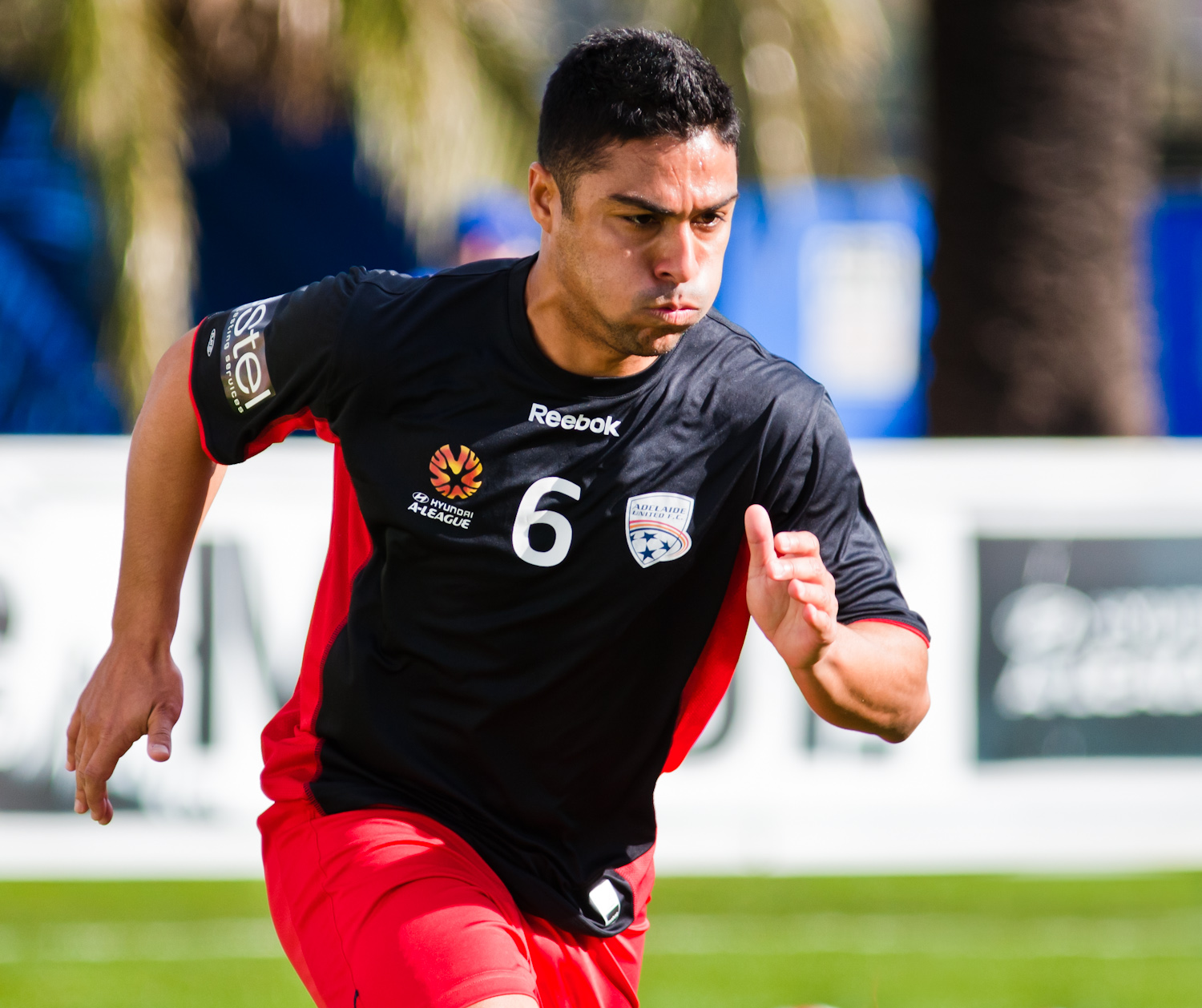
Cássio warming up with Adelaide United

Cassio's arrival at Adelaide United came after all of the club's options at left-back (Matthew Kemp, Adam van Dommele and Aaron Goulding) were either released or transferred at the end of the 2006–07 A-League season. Although failing to score during his debut A-League campaign, his 3 assists, and contribution of 14 shots on target, revealed how dangerous Cassio was as an attacking force. For his significant contributions on the field for the 2007–08 season, he was given three end of season awards, including the Club Champion award.

Despite a slow start to the 2008–2009 A-League season due to injury, Cassio proved just how valuable he had become to the club when he set up all three of Adelaide United's goals against FC Bunyodkor in the first leg semi-final of the 2008 AFC Champions League. On 15 October 2008 Cassio signed a new two-year deal with United despite interest from rival A-League clubs with the Brazilian stating that although they offered more money Adelaide was "like a second home" for the player.

Despite coming to Adelaide with a reputation of a goal scorer Cassio's first goal came midway through his second season with the club; a brilliant free kick against Melbourne Victory in late October. In December, Cassio scored a brace in Adelaide's 6–1 demolishing of Wellington with both goals coming from unstoppable drives after he cut in from the left channel.

On 3 January 2009, Cassio scored his fourth goal for Adelaide United against in the annual Sydney FC clash at Adelaide Oval. Adelaide went on to win the game 2–0. In the semi-final second leg against Melbourne Victory, Cassio was sent off by referee Matthew Breeze, and made a gesture toward the Melbourne crowd as he departed down the tunnel. In the 2009/10 season Cassio scored two goals, one from a free kick against Perth Glory and goal of the season-contender against Newcastle Jets to level the match at 1–1.

On 12 September 2011, Cassio revealed a desire to become an Australian citizen and play for the Socceroos. Cassio and his family became Australian citizens at a ceremony at Hindmarsh Stadium on 7 September 2012. As a result, he was eligible to represent Australia at international level. He also does not require a visa to play for Adelaide United, thus enabling the club to import another player on visa.

However Cassio eventually did not get to play for Australia after taking citizenship, and was not called up by the Socceroos to play in the 2014 FIFA World Cup, hosted by his birth country.

On 21 November 2012 he signed a two-year contract extension keeping him at the club until the end of 2014-15 A-League season.

2014 saw a return from injury for Cassio as he featured in a friendly against local side Eastern United FC. On 18 December 2014, Cassio was branded as "disrespectful" by Adelaide manager Josep Gombau for refusing to turn up to the 2014 FFA Cup Final to support his teammates, before or after the match, stating that he would not be selecting Cassio to play again, whilst refusing to rule out releasing him in January. Five days later, Cassio was released by Adelaide United.

As of March 2023, Cassio is the soccer academy director at Nazareth Catholic College, Adelaide.

== Career statistics ==
Correct as of 1 February 2011

Club	Season	League^{1}		Cup		Continental^{2}		Total	
Club	Season	Apps	Goals	Apps	Goals	Apps	Goals	Apps	Goals
Adelaide United	2007–08	17	0	5	3	4	0	26	3
Adelaide United	2008–09	16	4	3	0	11	0	30	4
Adelaide United	2009–10	19	2	-	-	3	1	22	3
Adelaide United	2010–11	30	0	-	-	-	-	30	0
Adelaide United	2011–12	7	0	-	-	-	-	7	0
Total		89	6	8	3	18	1	115	10

^{1} – includes A-League final series statistics
^{2} – includes FIFA Club World Cup statistics; AFC Champions League statistics are included in season commencing after group stages (i.e. 2008 ACL in 2008–09 A-League season etc.)

== Honours ==
Personal honours:

- Adelaide United Club Champion: 2007–08, 2010–11
- Adelaide United Player's Player of the Year: 2007–08
