= Stuart McLaren =

Scottish-Australian footballer and coach

Personal information
- Date of birth: 28 August 1975 (age 51)
- Place of birth: Glasgow, Scotland
- Positions: Centre back; central midfielder

Team information
- Current team: Northern Ireland women (assistant)

Youth career
- Capalaba
- Mount Gravatt
- Berserker
- 1992–1993: AIS

Senior career*
Years	Team	Apps	(Gls)
1994–1996	Wollongong Wolves	11	(1)
1996–1998	Stirling Albion	28	(9)
1998–2004	Brisbane Strikers	128	(11)
2005–2008	Queensland Roar	34	(1)
2008	Perth Glory	4	(0)

International career^{‡}
- Australia U20

Managerial career
- 2003–2004: Brisbane Strikers
- 2008–2010: Brisbane Strikers
- 2010–2011: North Queensland Fury (assistant)
- 2011–2014: Loughborough University (head coach)
- 2014–2016: Stirling Albion
- 2018–2022: Scotland U16
- 2021: Scotland women (interim)
- 2022–2023: Celtic (u18s)
- 2024–: Northern Ireland women (assistant)
- * Club domestic league appearances and goals ‡ National team caps and goals as of 26 November 2007

Stuart McLaren (born 28 August 1975) is a Scottish-Australian football player and coach, who is assistant coach for the Northern Ireland national women's team.

== Biography ==
Queensland Roar coach Miron Bleiberg signed McLaren on a short-term contract in early November 2005. He was signed due to Josh McCloughlan's injury, playing as a defender as he did when he was a former player-coach with the Brisbane Strikers in the NSL. He was then signed as a permanent player and regularly played in the starting eleven, occasionally captaining the Queensland Roar.

McLaren left Australia in early 2011 returning to the United Kingdom to be nearer his place of birth with his family. In June 2011, he was appointed as head coach at Loughborough University. McLaren was appointed manager of Stirling Albion in November 2014, but the Binos were relegated from Scottish League One at the end of the 2014–15 season. He left Stirling Albion by mutual consent in September 2016, following a 4–0 defeat by Elgin City.

In October 2018, McLaren was appointed by the Scottish Football Association to be a national youth team coach, with responsibility for the Scotland U16 team.

McLaren was appointed interim manager of the Scotland women's national football team in January 2021. He remained in the role until the appointment of permanent manager Pedro Martinez Losa, and left the SFA at the end of 2021.

In January 2022, Celtic announced McLaren had joined them as their under-18s manager. He remained at the club until his departure in December 2023.

== Managerial statistics ==
As of match played 24 September 2016

Team	Nat	From	To	Record				
Team	Nat	From	To	G	W	D	L	Win %
Stirling Albion	(Scotland)	2014	2016	82	22	17	43	26.83

- Scottish senior clubs statistics only.

== Honours ==
Brisbane Strikers

- National Soccer League: Runners-up 2003–04
- QSL Premiers: 2009

Loughborough University

- BUCS Championship: 2013
- BUCS Premier North Division: 2012, 2013

Scotland U16

- Victory Shield: 2019–20 (shared)
