= Josh McCloughan =

Australian soccer player and coach

Personal information
- Full name: Joshua McCloughan
- Date of birth: 12 December 1975 (age 50)
- Place of birth: Auburn, Australia
- Height: 1.91 m (6 ft 3 in)
- Positions: Left back; centre back

Youth career
- Palm Beach

Senior career*
Years	Team	Apps	(Gls)
1991–2000	Palm Beach		
2001–2002	Gold Coast City		
2003	Gold Coast Knights		
2003–2004	Brisbane Strikers	24	(1)
2005–2010	Brisbane Roar	90	(5)

Managerial career
- 2011: Southern Cross United
- 2012–2014: QAS / Brisbane Roar
- 2015–2016: Brisbane Roar Youth
- * Club domestic league appearances and goals as of 17 February 2009

Joshua McCloughan (born 12 December 1975, in Sydney, New South Wales, Australia) is a former A-League footballer who played as a central defender. An FFA A-Licence coach, he has spent time within Ange Postecoglou's Caltex Socceroos coaching setup and as a Joey's (Australian U17's) assistant. A foundation Brisbane Roar player, Josh returned to the club to coach the Brisbane Roar FC Youth team in the 2015/16 season. Josh has completed a Bachelor of Management, and regularly commentates A-League football for ABC Grandstand.

== Early career ==
Josh played in youth and men's divisions for Palm Beach for 9 years. He also played for the Brisbane Strikers before being signed as a foundation player by the Brisbane Roar.

== Playing career ==
In 2005, he signed with A league club Brisbane Roar where he was a first team regular. He played 16 games in his first season with the club. In 2010, he retired from professional football. He played 90 games for the Brisbane Roar, scoring 5 goals despite playing as a defender.

== Coaching career ==
Josh commenced his coaching career under significant mentorship from an array of highly experienced coaches, supported by Football Queensland and the FFA. Josh assisted the Queensland NTC program in 2013 and managed the 2014 campaign. After coaching the Queensland Academy of Sport (QAS) side in 2013 and 2014, in 2015 Josh returned to the Brisbane Roar as their under 18's Academy/QAS head coach. He then assumed the head coach role of the Brisbane Roar Youth Team for the 2015/16 season. The widely regarded young coach terminated his contract at the troubled Roar for professional reasons in August 2016.

He played a key role in Ange Postecoglou's scouting setup in the Caltex Socceroos AFC Asian Cup Championship in 2015 and World Cup Qualifiers, and acted as assistant coach for the U17 Australian team (Joeys) and the Socceroos on tours in 2015.

== A-League statistics ==
Club	Season	League^{1}		Cup		International^{2}		Total	
Club	Season	Apps	Goals	Apps	Goals	Apps	Goals	Apps	Goals
Brisbane Roar	2005–06	16	0	0	0	0	0	16	0
Brisbane Roar	2006–07	20	0	0	0	0	0	20	0
Brisbane Roar	2007–08	20	3	0	0	0	0	20	3
Brisbane Roar	2008–09	16	2	0	0	0	0	16	2
Brisbane Roar	2009–10	18	0	0	0	0	0	18	0
Total		90	5					90	5

^{1} - includes A-League final series statistics
^{2} - includes FIFA Club World Cup statistics; AFC Champions League statistics are included in season commencing after group stages (i.e. ACL and A-League seasons etc.)
