= Joel Griffiths =

Australian soccer player (born 1979)

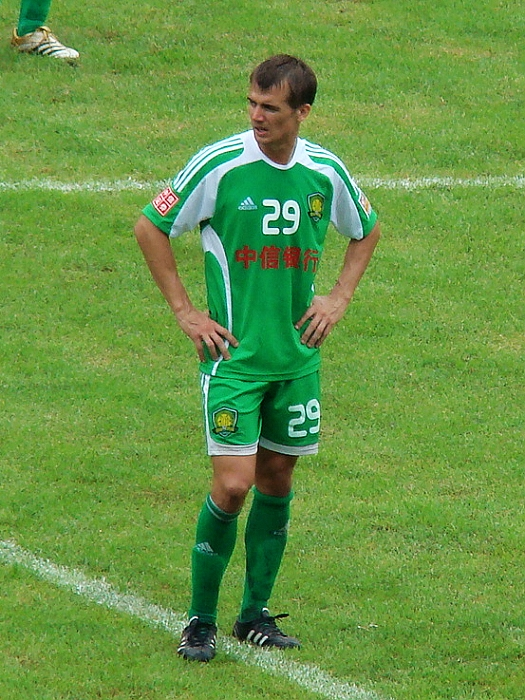
- Griffiths playing for Beijing Guoan in 2009

Personal information
- Full name: Joel Michael Griffiths
- Date of birth: 21 August 1979 (age 47)
- Place of birth: Sydney, Australia
- Height: 1.81 m (5 ft 11 in)
- Positions: Striker; right winger

Youth career
- 1994: Menai
- 1995–1997: Sutherland
- 1997–1999: Sydney United

Senior career*
Years	Team	Apps	(Gls)
1997–1999	Sydney United	28	(4)
1999–2001	Parramatta Power	51	(15)
2001–2003	Newcastle United FC	45	(28)
2003–2006	Neuchâtel Xamax	72	(12)
2006	Leeds United	2	(0)
2006–2010	Newcastle Jets	60	(28)
2008	→ Avispa Fukuoka (loan)	9	(3)
2009	→ Beijing Guoan (loan)	20	(8)
2010–2011	Beijing Guoan	56	(19)
2012	Shanghai Shenhua	18	(6)
2013	Sydney FC	8	(3)
2013	Qingdao Jonoon	7	(3)
2014–2015	Newcastle Jets	23	(6)
2015	Wellington Phoenix	13	(7)
2017–2019	Lambton Jaffas	27	(13)
2021	Newcastle Olympic	4	(0)
Total		443	(155)

International career
1999	Australia U-20	5	(1)
2005–2008	Australia	3	(1)

Managerial career
- 2021–2024: Newcastle Olympic
- * Club domestic league appearances and goals as of 17 April 2021

Joel Griffiths (born 21 August 1979) is a former Australian professional football player who played as a striker in the A-League and Chinese Super League. He later manager for Newcastle Olympic FC in National Premier Leagues Northern NSW.

== Biography ==
=== Club career ===
He played for Sydney United, Parramatta Power and Newcastle United in the now defunct National Soccer League. He also had a brief stint with Leeds United where he made two appearances.

He joined the Newcastle Jets on 31 July 2006, for an undisclosed fee after a brief spell in England with Leeds United, having signed from Swiss club Neuchâtel Xamax on 17 January 2006. He only managed two substitute appearances for Leeds and Griffiths attributed the lack of first team football to the perceived animosity from ex-Leeds manager Kevin Blackwell who only provided "non stop criticism".

After joining the Newcastle Jets in the 2006–07 season Griffiths quickly formed the basis of the team that underwent a strong resurgence under new coach Gary van Egmond. His memorable performances include scoring two goals in extra time against Perth Glory in round 20 to draw the game at 3–3. At the end of the regular season Griffiths had contributed a total of 6 goals for the Jets. The Jets would finish third in the regular season and be narrowly knocked out of the chance to play in the AFC Champions League and the 2007 Grand Final.

In the 2007–08 season, his twin brother Adam Griffiths joined the team. With the loss of key attacking players such as Nick Carle, Milton Rodríguez and Vaughan Coveny, Griffiths became the key to the Jets attack throughout the season. Early in the season Griffiths controversially assaulted a linesman, for which he was awarded a yellow card, narrowly escaping harsh punishment due to FIFA regulations. His club fined him two weeks' wages (one week of which was suspended). He later apologised for his actions. His performances on the pitch quickly lead him to be the focus of much media attention, with Griffiths remaining in career best form for much of the season.

Two goals against Melbourne Victory in round 17 saw him called into the training squad for the A-League based Socceroos, but later had to withdraw from the squad due to injury. At the end of Griffiths' outstanding regular season he had scored 12 goals, which earned him the A-League Golden Boot award. Finishing second in the regular season on goal difference, the Jets later went on to win the Grand Final.

With the conclusion of the season, Griffiths joined J2 League side Avispa Fukuoka on a loan spell. On 5 March 2008, it was announced that he joined the Japanese club on loan. In July, he returned to Newcastle. Joel was set to become the Newcastle Jets million dollar man and play as a marquee player. However this was cancelled, with Griffiths joining brother Ryan at Chinese club Beijing Guoan on a year long loan.

Griffiths was suspended for five matches earlier in the 2009 CSL season for elbowing an opposing player, and then later on the year, given a seven-week suspension for making a gesture towards opposing supporters. Although contracted to the Newcastle Jets for another two years, Griffiths refused to attend training. After impressing on loan at Beijing Guoan, he joined them on a permanent basis. Newcastle Jets agreed to an undisclosed fee.

Griffiths refused to extend his contract with Beijing Guoan and made a free transfer to Guoan's rival club Shanghai Shenhua in January 2012. Griffiths's contract with Shanghai Shenhua ended at the end of 2012.

Griffiths signed with Sydney FC in December 2012, being eligible to play with them from 14 January 2013.

In only his second appearance for Sydney F.C, a 3–1 loss to Melbourne Victory on 26 January 2012, Griffiths was alleged to have abused an assistant referee. He was handed a three-match suspension by the FFA's match review panel on 1 February 2013.

Following an underwhelming career for Sydney FC, he was released on 16 July 2013. He returned to China, where he has previously played in successful stints for Beijing Guoan and Shanghai Shenhua, signing a contract with another Super League club Qingdao Jonoon. On 11 January 2014, it was announced that he would return to the Newcastle Jets until the end of the season, at least. This was a very popular move amongst fans who still view him as a hero.

Griffiths was sacked from the Newcastle Jets by owner Nathan Tinkler, along with fellow players Kew Jaliens, Adrian Madaschi, and Billy Celeski after a player revolt leading up to, and following a 7–0 drubbing at the hands of Adelaide United. David Carney was reportedly also sacked by Tinkler but this was disputed by Carney and he remained with the club, although Stubbins refused to play him. Griffiths was then signed by Wellington Phoenix on a short-term contract through to the end of the 2014/15 A-League season but suffered a serious knee injury.

== International career ==
He represented Australia at the 1999 FIFA World Youth Championship held in Nigeria. Griffiths made his debut for the full national team on 9 October 2005 against Jamaica, scoring a goal before celebrating by hopping up and down like a Kangaroo. This was Australia's final warm up match before their World Cup qualifier playoff match against Uruguay.

In January 2008, he was named in the 22-man Socceroos squad for the training camp at Sydney, but did not play the World Cup Qualifying match against Qatar due to injury.

In May 2010, after not making the 31 man provisional squad for the 2010 Fifa World Cup, he made the following comments about Pim Verbeek:

- There was no phone call, not even a text. Not once did he come and watch a game. He made the effort to watch the third division in England or third division [in] Italy, and sometimes they [the Australian players] were not even on the bench. It really pisses me off when he said we have better strikers than Joel Griffiths, how the f--- would he know? He's never seen me for two years and when he did I was [A-League] MVP and golden boot.

== Personal life ==
Griffiths's twin brother, Adam and younger brother, Ryan are also professional footballers. He married his childhood sweetheart, Bianca Janson, in December 2007. His daughter, Gizelle Janson Griffiths, was born on 29 April 2009.

== National team statistics ==
Australia national team
Year	Apps	Goals
2005	1	1
2006	1	0
2007	0	0
2008	1	0
Total	3	1

== Honours ==
=== Club ===
Sydney United

- Australian National Soccer League Premiership: 1998-99

Newcastle Jets

- A-League Championship: 2007–08

Beijing Guoan

- Chinese Super League Championship: 2009

=== Individual ===
- Johnny Warren Medal: 2007–08 with Newcastle Jets
- A-League Golden Boot: 2007–08 with Newcastle Jets – 12 goals
- Newcastle Jets Player of the Year: 2007–08
- Newcastle Jets Member's Player of the Year: 2006–07, 2007–08

Awards
Preceded by Daniel Allsopp	A-League Golden Boot; 2007/08	Succeeded by Shane Smeltz
