= Jorge Drovandi =

Argentine footballer

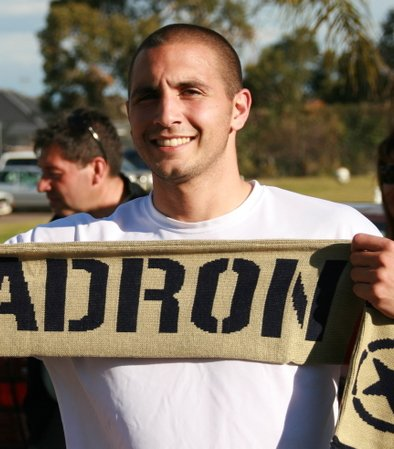

Personal information
- Full name: Jorge Alberto Drovandi
- Date of birth: 5 November 1985 (age 40)
- Place of birth: Rosario, Santa Fe, Argentina
- Height: 1.72 m (5 ft 8 in)
- Position: Striker

Team information
- Current team: Sportivo Barracas
- Number: 9

Senior career*
Years	Team	Apps	(Gls)
2004–2005	San Lorenzo	6	(0)
2005–2006	Chacarita Juniors	26	(4)
2006	Rosario Central		
2007	Newcastle Jets	1	(0)
2008	Aldosivi	5	(0)
2008	Lujan de Cuyo	7	(4)
2009	Deportivo Azogues		
2010	Herediano	13	(4)
2012	CD Aguilar		
2012–2103	Uruguay de Coronado		
2013	Central Córdoba		
2013–2014	Sportivo Las Parejas	9	(3)
2015	Alianza	13	(2)
2016–	Sportivo Barracas		
- * Club domestic league appearances and goals as of 12 April 2015

Jorge Alberto Drovandi (born 5 November 1985 in Rosario) is an Argentine footballer who plays for Sportivo Barracas as a left sided striker. His nickname in Spanish is "El Mono" which means "The Monkey".

== Club career ==
Drovandi began his professional football career in the Argentine Primera División with San Lorenzo de Almagro before dropping into the lower leagues with Chacarita Juniors, Aldosivi and Asociación Atlético Luján de Cuyo.

Drovandi arrived in Newcastle on 2 August 2007 and was given the number 7 jersey. He made his A-League debut when he came on as a substitute against Perth Glory in Round 1.

Before the end of 2007 he didn't renew his contract Newcastle Jets, and went to play in the Ecuadorian league where he did really well scoring several opportunities in Deportivo Azogues. His contract expired and left for Costa Rica where he played in Club Sport Herediano, one of the three most important teams in the Central American country, in the last semester of 2009, there he scored a few goals in a team that did not give him much opportunity and is going through financial difficulties.

He signed for Salvadoran club Alianza ahead of the 2015 Clausura season.
