= Leandro Love =

Brazilian footballer (born 1985)

Personal information
- Full name: Leandro Rodrigues da Silva
- Date of birth: 3 December 1985 (age 40)
- Place of birth: São Paulo, Brazil
- Height: 1.80 m (5 ft 11 in)
- Position: Forward

Team information
- Current team: Tricordiano-MG

Senior career*
Years	Team	Apps	(Gls)
2004–2006	Rio Preto		
2005	→ Pão de Açúcar (loan)		
2005	→ Juventus (SP) (loan)		
2006	Vissel Kobe	1	(0)
2007	Amparo	0	(0)
2007	→ Rio Branco (SP) (loan)	0	(0)
2007–2009	Brasilis	0	(0)
2007–2008	→ Melbourne Victory FC (loan)	15	(0)
2009	→ Oeste (loan)	0	(0)
2009	→ ABC (loan)	0	(0)
2009	→ Criciúma (loan)	6	(0)
2010	Marília	0	(0)
2010–2011	Linense	0	(0)
2011–2012	Portuguesa	3	(0)
2012	→ Red Bull Brasil (loan)	15	(8)
2014	Red Bull Brasil	6	(0)
2014	Guaratinguetá	8	(0)
2015–	URT	0	(0)
2016–	Tricordiano-MG	0	(0)
2019–2020	Rec do Libolo	18	(8)
- * Club domestic league appearances and goals as of 21 March 2020

Leandro Rodrigues da Silva (born 3 December 1985), known as Leandro Love, is a Brazilian footballer who plays for Rio Claro Futebol Clube - SP as a forward.

== Club career ==
Born in São Paulo, he started his career with Rio Preto. On 8 August 2006 he was signed by J2 League club Vissel Kobe. He played his only league match on 30 September 2006. In December 2006 he was signed by Amparo but he was loaned to Rio Branco (SP) in January 2007 for Campeonato Paulista. He scored 4 goals in 17 games.

=== Melbourne Victory ===
On 3 July he was sold to Brasilis and loaned to A-League club Melbourne Victory FC soon after, as the fourth and last foreigner. He played 15 A-League games and once in the 2008 AFC Champions League; he was released on 30 June 2008.

=== Return to São Paulo state ===
In January 2009 he was loaned to Campeonato Paulista club Oeste. He scored one goal in eight appearances (only two in the starting linne-up). In May 2009 he left for ABC for 2009 Campeonato Brasileiro Série B but was released before round one. He then left for Série C side Criciúma.

In December 2009 he was signed by Marília for 2010 Campeonato Paulista Série A2. He started all 19 matches and scored 12 goals, including two hat-tricks.

In June 2010, he signed a one-year contract with Linense for Copa Paulista and 2011 Campeonato Paulista. On 28 April 2011, he moved to Brazilian Série B club Portuguesa.

In December 2015, the Tricordiano-MG hired Leandro Love for the 2016 season. Since then he has played for São Bento (SP), Treze FC, Rio Claro FC and CS Seriog-SE. At the 2019–20 season, he played for CRD Libolo.
