= Marcinho (footballer, born July 1981) =

Brazilian footballer

Personal information
- Full name: Márcio Luiz Adurens
- Date of birth: 31 July 1981 (age 45)
- Place of birth: Santos, São Paulo, Brazil
- Height: 1.79 m (5 ft 10 in)
- Position: Attacking midfielder

Youth career
- 1999–2001: São Paulo

Senior career*
Years	Team	Apps	(Gls)
2002–2003	São Paulo	11	(1)
2002	→ Anápolis (loan)		(12)
2003	→ Botafogo-SP (loan)		
2003–2004	→ CRAC (loan)		(14)
2003	→ Sport Recife (loan)		
2004	Grêmio Inhumense		
2004	Gama		
2005	Naval 1º de Maio	5	(0)
2005	Atlético Goianiense		
2006	Hapoel Nazareth Illit		
2007	Goiânia		
2007–2008	Queensland Roar	22	(3)
2008	CFZ do Rio		
2008–2009	América-RN		
2009–2010	Diagoras		
2010	Paulista		
2010	Uberaba		
2011	DHJ		
2011	Jabaquara		
2012–2013	Marília		
2014	Cerâmica		
2015	São José		
2016	Batatais		
- * Club domestic league appearances and goals as of 26 December 2008

Márcio Luiz Adurens, known as Marcinho or Márcio Luiz, (born 31 July 1981) is a footballer.

== Club career ==
Marcinho grew up in Brazil's São Paulo FC, where he played alongside players such as Kaká and Júlio Baptista. He helped São Paulo FC to the 1999 Campeão Paulista de Juniores title and scored the winning goal in the final of the 2000 Copa São Paulo de Futebol Júnior.

Overseas he has had spells at Portuguese Liga outfit Naval 1º de Maio and Hapoel Nazareth Illit, helping the Israeli club to reach the Israeli Premier League for the first time in its history.

In 2007, Marcinho signed a one-year deal to play for Queensland Roar of the Hyundai A-League in Australia.
