= 2006–07 Adelaide United FC season =

Adelaide United
2006–07 season
- Manager: John Kosmina
- A-League: 2nd
- A-League Finals: Runners-up
- Pre-Season Challenge Cup: Winners
- Top goalscorer: League: Nathan Burns, Fernando (6); All: Travis Dodd, Carl Veart (9)
- Highest home attendance: 16,378 vs. Melbourne Victory (1 December 2006)
- Lowest home attendance: 8,785 vs. Newcastle Jets (8 September 2006)
- Average home league attendance: 12,553

The 2006–07 season was Adelaide United FC's the club's second season in the A-League (third season in top flight football). The club had success winning the 2005–06 Adelaide United FC season Premiership and finishing third in the finals series. Adelaide began their 2006–07 season with a 2–2 draw with local club Adelaide Galaxy and a 2–1 win over a State Select in their pre-season fixtures. This was followed up with a highly successful pre-season cup which the Reds won, defeating Central Coast Mariners on penalties in the grand final.

Adelaide United finished second in the 2006–07 Premiership. Competing for the Championship, The Reds advanced to the 2006–07 Grand Final after winning 4–3 on penalties (1–1 AET) against the Newcastle Jets. Adelaide United played Melbourne Victory at the Telstra Dome in the Grand Final on 18 February 2007 losing 6–0 whilst playing most of the game with only 10 men after captain Ross Aloisi was sent off for his second bookable offence. Following a controversial post grand final interview, Ross Aloisi was sacked as captain of Adelaide United, and left the club to move to Wellington Phoenix. He was replaced as captain by Angelo Costanzo on 22 February 2007. At the same as this announcement was made, it was also announced that coach John Kosmina would be sacked. It was widely speculated that Kosmina had been told to resign by the board of Adelaide United the Thursday after the grand final. Assistant Coach Aurelio Vidmar was appointed interim coach. On 22 October 2007, former Adelaide United coach John Kosmina took up the role as the new head coach of Sydney FC.

== Review ==
The 2006–07 season also saw Brazilian international Romário join the club for a four-game guest player stint.

Adelaide United were selected, along with Sydney FC, as the first Australian representatives to play in the 2007 AFC Champions League. They received their Asian berth as A-League premiers. Adelaide was drawn into Group G with Chinese champion Shandong Luneng Taishan, Korean champions Seongnam Ilhwa Chunma and Vietnamese league and Super Cup champions Gach Dong Tam Long An.

Adelaide lost to Shandong 1–0, defeated Long An 2–0, drew with Seongnam 2–2, then lost to the Korean team 1–0. The Reds broke Shandong's winning streak in a 2–2 draw, before finishing its campaign with a 3–0 win over Long An, thanks to a hat trick from Travis Dodd. This match marked the last Adelaide United appearances of Fernando Rech and Carl Veart as the 1–0 loss to Seongyam knocked Adelaide out of quarter finals contention. Adelaide finished 3rd in its group, ahead of Long An and behind Shandong; with group winner Seongnam making the semi-finals. Dodd scored on 4 occasions, Rech 3 times, and Olyroos players Bruce Djite and Nathan Burns one a piece.

Adelaide United were linked with Brazilian football legend Romário. The 1994 World Cup winner was still attempting to score 1,000 goals and be up there with Pelé as the all-time greatest scorer. Romário, 40, will play for the Reds on a four-week guest stint of which each club is allowed to sign two players. Last year, Sydney FC signed Kazuyoshi "Kazu" Miura for four A-League matches and the Club World Championships and this season they are set to sign Italian forward Benito Carbone. The Newcastle United Jets are also reportedly interested in a guest player, former 1990s English striker Stan Collymore.

The Football Federation Australia has agreed to let Adelaide United sign Romário. This came days after they said no to the Jets in their chase for Collymore. Romário is still playing for Miami FC in the United Soccer Leagues which is America's second division. He is currently on 984 career goals and needs 16 more to reach the 1,000 mark which he said had become an obsession.

It was reported in The Advertiser on Wednesday 27 September 2006, that the Sultan of Brunei, Hassanal Bolkiah had inquired about Romário. The Sultan could offer much bigger money than Adelaide United. The article also stated the matches that Romário is most likely to play. Under the deal that United wished to sign him on, Romário would play two matches for his current club Miami FC against Adelaide United and two days later against an FFSA Select Team with both of these matches at Hindmarsh Stadium. He would then play four A-League matches for United against the Mariners in Gosford, followed by three home matches against Melbourne, New Zealand and Newcastle. United are also reportedly looking at the option of signing him for the rest of the A-League season.

On Friday 29 September 2006, Adelaide United Football Club released an official statement on their website which confirmed the signing of Romário to a four match guest stint. He will play four A-League matches for United against Central Coast in Gosford, followed by three home matches against Melbourne Victory, NZ Knights and Newcastle Jets.

United signed Jason Spagnuolo and Greg Owens on long-term deals after they impressed during their 4-week stay in the 2005–06 season. Qu Shengqing originally left Adelaide to return to China but has now signed for another A-League season. Nathan Burns joins Adelaide from the AIS.

Adelaide United played two major pre-season friendlies. They began with a 2–2 draw with Galaxy and played in front of a 1,500 strong crowd at the Marden Sports Complex against a Super League Select.

United performed well in the group stage beating Melbourne Victory before draws against the Mariners and Perth. They failed to take advantage of the Bonus Round offer only beating the NZ Knights 1–0. This meant that they would meet Sydney FC in Wollongong, continuing a strong rivalry formed in Season One. Adelaide's Kristian Rees scored an injury time winner to send the Reds through to their first ever final. United won this match on penalties after Andre Gumprecht cancelled out Carl Veart's spectacular overhead bicycle kick. Stewart Petrie was the unlucky Mariner to miss while Carl Veart was the hero with the winning spot kick.

Adelaide United were looking to build upon their successful opening season in which they won the minor premiership. They choked in the finals however and their aim for season two was to achieve results in the Finals Series. They open the season with away matches in Melbourne and Auckland.

A win for Melbourne who dominated. The three Brazilians impressed particularly Alessandro who won the penalty and gave Adelaide's Richie Alagich a lot of trouble down the flanks. For Adelaide the likes of Qu Shengqing, Travis Dodd, Carl Veart did not produce their best football and Adelaide's attack was toothless.

Another lackluster performance from Adelaide as the much-improved New Zealand Knights stole all three points with an early contender for goal of the season from Ghanaian midfielder Malik Buari. Sean Devine, Jonti Richter and Darren Bazeley were all solid contributors for New Zealand while the entire Adelaide side played well below their best.

Adelaide returns to form with an emphatic 5–1 demolition of the Newcastle United Jets on a cold, wet Friday night at Hindmarsh Stadium. Nothing went right for the Jets as United scored three times in the first half hour with all three goals beginning with set pieces. Fernando got the ball rolling as he turned in a Jason Spagnuolo free kick. Robert Cornthwaite followed up a Ross Aloisi free kick and then Chinese striker Qu scored directly from a free kick. Jets striker Bridge pulled one back for the Jets in the second half but defender Durante scored a horrendous own goal. Bobby Petta impressed on his debut match for the Reds.

Adelaide United put in their second successive impressive performance and they were simply too good for the Glory who seemed to have no power going forward without injured stars Stan Lazaridis and Bobby Despotovski. United created chances from the first whistle with Dodd going close before Fernando opened the scoring with a shot in the 14th minute which beat goalkeeper Aleks Vrteski. The second goal came as the Glory defence sat back allowing superb winger Dodd too much time and space and he blasted the ball straight through Vrteski to make it 2–0. United added the third goal five minutes after the interval as Fernando's shot which was heading wide of the target took a wicked deflection off Jamie Coyne and fooled Vrteski. Coyne was credited with the own goal. United then created late chances through subs Bobby Petta and debutant Dez Giraldi but the score remained at 3–0.

Queensland dominated their match against Adelaide and certainly showed why they are title contenders early in the season. Their five-man attack consisting of Ante Milicic, Reinaldo, Yuning Zhang, Simon Lynch and Dario Vidosic is certain to score goals this season and only some outstanding saves by Reds keeper Robert Bajic kept Adelaide in the game. Qu Shengqing will come under the FFA review panel's scrutiny for his headbutt on Roar captain Chad Gibson. At the end of the match a flurry of Queensland chances, most of which fell to Zhang, were not enough to secure the points for Queensland.

A poor match from Adelaide allowed Sydney FC to move four points clear of them on the A-League ladder. Sydney FC started the match well with Alex Brosque and Benito Carbone. Travis Dodd had the first chance of the game in a one-on-one with Clint Bolton but the speedy United winger took a bad touch allowing Bolton to make a save. In the 38th minute, Carbone was allowed too much time and space and he lobbed a ball over to Zadkovich who tapped the ball past Bajic. United returned from the half time interval as the better team and they only had to wait eight minutes before Nathan Burns scored his first A-League goal. Dodd made all the hard work go to waste however, when three minutes later he scored an own goal attempting to clear a ball which posed no danger. Carbone set up the third with a backheel which broke down the entire defence allowing substitute Petrovski to make the score 3–1. Then Carbone finally scored a goal for himself. He broke free on the right hand side and the flag stayed down allowing him to slot the ball past Bajic. 4–1 to Sydney FC. Jason Spagnuolo and Carl Veart missed two easy chances to make the scoreline less embarrassing and Adelaide's defence knows it must improve with the dangerous Damian Mori coming to Adelaide next Friday night.

A much improved performance from United after the 4–1 drubbing at home by Sydney FC. The Mariners started as the better side but United scored the opener as Jason Spagnuolo made the most of a defensive error by Damian Mori to provide the cross from which Carl Veart headed home from close range. Central Coast hit back a quarter of an hour later as Australian football legend and Socceroos all-time top scorer Damian Mori received a good ball, beat Ang Costanzo for pace and rounded 'keeper Robbie Bajic before celebrating his return to Hindmarsh Stadium in front of 10,000 booing Reds supporters. Adelaide after the half time break and threw absolutely everything at CCM with Matthew Kemp and Bobby Petta having almost identical chances saved by Vukovic. Greg Owens and Nathan Burns also missed crucial opportunities. Petta provided a good corner and tall centre back Kristian Rees headed home for his first goal of the season. Noel Spencer missed the Mariners' best chance of the half and United wrapped the game up with Carl Veart setting up a free Nathan Burns who ran the length of one half and slotted the ball past Vukovic.

One of the matches of the season as the Melbourne Victory attempted to maintain a 100% record against an Adelaide side nearing the top of their game. The match got off to a fiery start as Ross Aloisi and Grant Brebner received yellow cards in the opening minute. The Victory had the better of the chances during the match, yet it was the Reds who came away with the 3 points as a counter-attacking move saw Greg Owens run free and slot the ball past 'keeper Theoklitos. The main talking point however, was an altercation between Victory captain Kevin Muscat and Adelaide coach John Kosmina. The ball had gone out of play for a Melbourne throw-in and with his side 0–1 down, Muscat wanted to retrieve the ball quickly. The ball had gone under Kosmina's chair and as the Reds manager was picking it up, Muscat sent the Kossie sprawling to the turf. Kosmina then got up and grabbed Muscat by the throat. Kosmina was sent to the stands while Muscat received a booking. Kosmina was given a 6-week suspension, with two suspended. The Victory still sit atop the A-League ladder while United are third.

An impressive attacking performance as Adelaide go outright second on the A-League ladder. Rising stars Nathan Burns and Bruce Djite showed that they can do whatever Fernando and Qu can do. Jason Spagnuolo more assists setting up goals for Burns and Petta. However, the defensive effort wasn't as good as the Hindmarsh crowd has come to expect with poor defending giving Noah Hickey the Knights second of the season and Adam van Dommele scoring an embarrassing own goal to make matters worse. Dodd sealed the win with a late header which beat Milosevic.

Another match that bore similarities to the Round 5 match against the Roar. Newcastle dominated possession but Adelaide continued to defend well. Bajic made six saves and defenders scrambled to cover him even when he was beaten. As in round five, Adelaide had to absorb pressure, the Jets had 24 shots at goal. Unlike the Queenslanders however, Newcastle punished Adelaide for its lapses in defence. At 1–1, 88 minutes into the match, Carl Veart had a chance to steal the game and cement second place on the ladder with his third spot kick of the night. The Jets had conceded two penalties with the first having to be retaken. Veart blasted the would-be match sealer over the bar and a minute later the Jets scored the winner instead.

Adelaide born Mimi Saric opened the scoring early in the first half due to some ball watching from the Adelaide defense but Carl Veart equalised literally straight after Saric scored after Spagnuolo was being held in the box. Eight minutes later Greg Owens scored a great goal after Travis Dodd burned down the right win and cross along to Veart, who missed the ball only for Greg Owens to place a perfect shot into the goal. Greg Owens missed another chance to put his side ahead but headed wide from 3 yards. On half time Perth were awarded a penalty after a player was pushed in the Perth box. Bobby scored from the spot and the teams were equal at half time. Early in the second half Matty Kemp scored a goal from a narrow angle where he jumped and kicked the ball over the keepers head only for it to sneak under the crossbar and win the game.

A deserved win for Adelaide who dominated. Adelaide dominated play despite early shots from Queensland and the Roar hardly tested Bajic until the end of the second half. Travis Dodds goal came from a long pass from Greg Owens deep in the midfield to Carl Veart who shrugged off his defender and delivered a ball across the face of goal to give Travis the easiest of goals.

Muscat scored from the spot early in the half after Bajic needlessly kicked Fred in the gut while retrieving the ball. Fernando scored a header from a cross from Matthew Kemp to equalize and Adelaide looked to score again. Half time came for AUFC as they were gaining momentum. The game was 50/50 after half time until the ageing Adelaide midfield began to tire and in the 61st minute Allsopp scored due and in the 86th minute Fred scored after his 1v1 shot was blocked by Beltrame, but Fred scored on the rebound.

Gao Leilei scored in the 16th minute after Richie Alagich started to wander and entered the 6-yard box without any pressure and slotted the ball past Beltrame's near post. Adelaide had chances and Spagnuolo hit the bar but in the 71st minute Greg Owens passed to Travis Dodd in the midfield and Travis out dribbled the defense to deliver a perfect ball back to Greg Owens whose shot hit the ball then went in off the keeper.

This match was Diego's debut. Travis Dodd was brought down on the edge of the box and Petta took the free kick. Petta crossed to an unmarked Diego who headed the ball into Fernando's chest and the ball went through Bolton's legs. Soon after Beltrame denied Coricas header with a diving save and Adelaide took second place.

Adelaide scored in the 10th minute thanks to some wing-play from former Celtic star Bobby Petta who crossed the ball across the goal to Burns who scored an easy tap in. After half time Kwasnik missed a penalty after Kemp hand-balled in the box and straight after Burns scored his second of the night with a cheeky feint to trick the keeper. Soon after Burns made his own goal after passing to Djite who passed to Petta, who rolled the ball through the Mariners defense to give Burnsy a relatively easy goal. Pondeljak's goal came after a messed up clearance by Beltrame. Beltrame kicked it straight to Pondeljak who showed instinct and skill by perfectly placing it above Bells head and ending his hope for his clean sheet. Djite hit the bar from a stunning volley from distance but failed to score. This game cemented Adelaide's second-place finish.

== Players ==
Note: Flags indicate national team as defined under FIFA eligibility rules; some limited exceptions apply. Players may hold more than one non-FIFA nationality.

No.	Pos.	Nation	Player
1	GK	AUS	Daniel Beltrame
2	DF	AUS	Richie Alagich
4	DF	AUS	Angelo Costanzo
5	DF	AUS	Michael Valkanis
6	DF	BRA	Cássio
7	MF	AUS	Lucas Pantelis
8	FW	AUS	Carl Veart
10	FW	BRA	Fernando
12	MF	AUS	Greg Owens
13	MF	AUS	Travis Dodd

No.	Pos.	Nation	Player
15	FW	AUS	Nathan Burns
16	MF	NED	Bobby Petta
18	DF	AUS	Robert Cornthwaite
19	FW	CHN	Qu Shengqing
20	GK	AUS	Robert Bajic
21	MF	AUS	Jason Spagnuolo
23	FW	AUS	Dez Giraldi
25	FW	AUS	Bruce Djite
26	DF	BRA	Diego Walsh

== Transfers ==
=== Transfers in ===
No.	Position	Player	Transferred from	Type/fee	Contract length	Date	Ref
12	MF	Greg Owens	Sydney FC	Undisclosed	1 year	9 June 2006	
25	FW	Bruce Djite	(Australia) Australian Institute of Sport	Undisclosed	2 years	1 July 2006	
30	GK	Ben Moore	(Australia) West Adelaide	Undisclosed	1 year	1 July 2006	
19	FW	(China) Qu Shengqing	(China) Shanghai Greenland Shenhua	Undisclosed	2 years	1 August 2006	
16	MF	(Netherlands) Bobby Petta	(England) Bradford City	Free	1 year	28 July 2006	
15	FW	Nathan Burns	(Australia) Australian Institute of Sport	Free	2 years	1 January 2007	
6	DF	(Brazil) Cássio Oliveira	(Brazil) Santa Cruz	Free	6 years	1 January 2007	
26	DF	(Brazil) Diego Walsh	(United States) Miami	Undisclosed	2 years	9 January 2007	
8	MF	Kristian Sarkies	Melbourne Victory	Free	4 years	1 March 2007	

=== Loans in ===
No.	Position	Player	Transferred from	Contract length	Date	Ref
11	FW	(Brazil) Romario	(Brazil) Vasco da Gama	1 month	1 November 2006	

=== Transfers out ===
No.	Position	Player	Transferred to	Type/fee	Date	Ref
14	DF	Aaron Goulding	(Australia) Para Hills Knights	Undisclosed	1 July 2006	
16	MF	Tony Hatzis	(Australia) North Eastern MetroStars	Free	1 July 2006	
30	GK	Ben Moore	(Australia) Adelaide City	Undisclosed	1 May 2007	
3	DF	Kristian Rees	(Australia) Whittlesea Zebras	Undisclosed	1 May 2007	
17	DF	Adam van Dommele	(Australia) South Melbourne	Free	1 May 2007	
8	FW	Carl Veart	Retired		16 May 2007	

=== Loans out ===
No.	Position	Player	Transferred to	Date	Ref
11	FW	(Brazil) Romario	(Brazil) Vasco da Gama	1 December 2006	

== Squad statistics ==
=== Appearances and goals ===
As of 27 March 2007

No.	Pos.	Name	A-League		Pre-Season Challenge Cup		AFC Champions League		Total	
No.	Pos.	Name	Apps	Goals	Apps	Goals	Apps	Goals	Apps	Goals
1	GK	(Australia) Daniel Beltrame	10+1	0	2	0	3	0	16	0
2	DF	(Australia) Richie Alagich	18+3	0	6	0	6	0	33	0
3	DF	(Australia) Kristian Rees	0	0	0	0	6	0	6	0
4	DF	(Australia) Angelo Costanzo	18+4	0	4+1	0	6	0	33	0
5	DF	(Australia) Michael Valkanis	22+1	0	6	0	6	0	34	0
6	DF	(Brazil) Cássio	0	0	0	0	0	0	0	0
7	MF	(Australia) Lucas Pantelis	0	0	0	0	1+3	0	4	0
8	FW	(Australia) Carl Veart	23+1	5	6	3	1+2	0	33	8
9	DF	(Australia) Matthew Kemp	14+5	1	4+1	0	4+1	0	29	0
10	FW	(Brazil) Fernando	20+1	6	0	0	4	3	25	9
12	MF	(Australia) Greg Owens	12+9	4	6	0	0	0	27	4
13	MF	(Australia) Travis Dodd	20+4	4	6	1	6	4	36	9
15	FW	(Australia) Nathan Burns	15+6	6	0+3	0	5	1	29	7
16	MF	(Netherlands) Bobby Petta	8+7	1	0	0	0+1	0	16	1
18	DF	(Australia) Robert Cornthwaite	6+2	1	6	0	0+1	0	15	1
19	FW	(China) Shengqing Qu	6+1	1	3	1	0	0	10	1
20	GK	(Australia) Robert Bajic	15	0	4	0	3	0	22	0
21	MF	(Australia) Jason Spagnuolo	15+6	0	5+1	0	0+1	0	28	0
23	FW	(Australia) Dez Giraldi	0+1	0	0	0	1+3	0	5	0
25	FW	(Australia) Bruce Djite	0+8	0	0+2	0	5	1	15	1
26	DF	(Brazil) Diego Walsh	5+1	0	0	0	2	0	8	0
Players sold but featured this season
6	MF	(Australia) Ross Aloisi	10+3	1	0+3	1	0	0	16	2
11	FW	(Brazil) Romário	4	1	0	0	0	0	5	1
14	DF	(Australia) Aaron Goulding	9+3	0	6	0	3	0	21	0
17	DF	(Australia) Adam van Dommele	2+3	0	0+4	0	3	0	12	0
30	GK	(Australia) Ben Moore	0	0	0	0	0	0	0	0

== Pre-season ==
=== Friendlies ===
1 July 2006	Adelaide Galaxy (Australia)	2–2	(Australia) Adelaide United	Adelaide
			Budin	Stadium: Camden Sports Complex

12 July 2006	Adelaide United (Australia)	2–1	(Australia) S.A. State Team	Adelaide
19:00 ACST	Valkanis 47'; Kemp 57'		Budin	Stadium: MARS Sports Complex; Attendance: 1,500

17 October 2006	Adelaide United (Australia)	1–2	(United States) Miami FC	Adelaide
	Qu 31'	Report	Romário 35'; Bruno 86'	Stadium: Hindmarsh Stadium; Attendance: 7,528

=== Pre-Season Challenge Cup ===
16 July 2006 Group Stage	Melbourne Victory (Victoria (state))	0–1	(South Australia) Adelaide United	Launceston
13:00 AEST		Report	Veart 65'	Stadium: Aurora Stadium; Attendance: 6,834; Referee: Matthew Breeze

22 July 2006 Group Stage	Central Coast Mariners (New South Wales)	0–0	(South Australia) Adelaide United	Orange
15:00 AEST		Report		Stadium: Wade Park; Attendance: 4,330; Referee: Simon Przydacz

30 July 2006 Group Stage	Perth Glory (Western Australia)	0–0	(South Australia) Adelaide United	Perth
18:00 AWST		Report		Stadium: Dorrien Gardens; Attendance: 3,038; Referee: Angelo Nardi

4 August 2006 Bonus Round	Adelaide United (South Australia)	1–0	New Zealand Knights	Adelaide
20:00 ACST	Veart 19' (pen.)	Report		Stadium: Hindmarsh Stadium; Attendance: 12,006; Referee: Craig Zetter

11 August 2006 Play-offs	Sydney FC (New South Wales)	1–2	(South Australia) Adelaide United	Wollongong
19:30 AEST	Carney 43'	Report	Dodd 16'; Rees 90'	Stadium: WIN Stadium; Attendance: 4,210; Referee: Mark Shield

19 August 2006 Final	Central Coast Mariners (New South Wales)	1–1 (a.e.t.) (4–5 p)	(South Australia) Adelaide United	Gosford
18:00 AEST	Gumprecht 77'	Report	Veart 7'	Stadium: Central Coast Stadium; Attendance: 10,463; Referee: Simon Przydacz
	Penalties
	McMaster (penalty scored); Petrie (penalty missed); O'Sullivan (penalty scored); Spencer (penalty scored); Hutchinson (penalty scored)		(penalty scored) Alagich; (penalty scored) Owens; (penalty scored) Aloisi; (penalty scored) Qu; (penalty scored) Veart

== Competitions ==
=== Overview ===
Competition	Record							
Competition	P	W	D	L	GF	GA	GD	Win %
A-League	25	10	5	10	34	36	−2	40.00
Pre-Season Challenge Cup	6	3	3	0	5	2	+3	50.00
AFC Champions League	6	2	2	2	9	6	+3	33.33
Total	37	15	10	12	48	44	+4	40.54

Updated to match played completed results
Source: Competitions

=== A-League ===
==== League table ====
Pos	Team	Pld	W	D	L	GF	GA	GD	Pts	Qualification
1	Melbourne Victory (C)	21	14	3	4	41	20	+21	45	Qualification for 2008 AFC Champions League group stage and Finals series
2	Adelaide United	21	10	3	8	32	27	+5	33	Qualification for 2008 AFC Champions League group stage and Finals series
3	Newcastle Jets	21	8	6	7	32	30	+2	30	Qualification for Finals series
4	Sydney FC	21	8	8	5	29	19	+10	29 (Note: Sydney FC were penalised three competition points following round 18 due to salary cap breaches which occurred during the 2005–06 season)	Qualification for Finals series
5	Queensland Roar	21	8	5	8	25	27	−2	29	
6	Central Coast Mariners	21	6	6	9	22	26	−4	24	
7	Perth Glory	21	5	5	11	24	30	−6	20	
8	New Zealand Knights (Note: New Zealand Knights cannot qualify for the AFC Champions League as they are not recognised as an AFC club.)	21	5	4	12	13	39	−26	19	Disbanded at end of season

Source: ultimatealeague.com
Rules for classification: 1) points; 2) goal difference; 3) number of goals scored.
(C) Champions

==== Matches ====
25 August 2006; 20:00	Melbourne Victory	2–0	Adelaide United	Olympic Park
	Kevin Muscat 29' pen Claudinho 78'	(Report) (Summary)		Attendance: 15,781; Referee: Matthew Breeze (Australia)

2 September 2006; 12:30	New Zealand Knights	1–0	Adelaide United	North Harbour Stadium
	Malik Buari 88'	(Report) (Summary)		Attendance: 4,100; Referee: Peter Green (Australia)

8 September 2006; 19:30	Adelaide United	5–1	Newcastle United Jets	Hindmarsh Stadium
	Fernando 8', 72'; Robert Cornthwaite 19'; Qu Shengqing 28'; Andrew Durante (OG) 65'	(Report) (Summary)	Mark Bridge 52'	Attendance: 8,785; Referee: Mark Shield (Australia)

16 September 2006; 18:30	Adelaide United	3–0	Perth Glory	Hindmarsh Stadium
	Fernando 14'; Travis Dodd 34'; Jamie Coyne (og) 50'	(Report) (Summary)		Attendance: 11,474; Referee: Peter O'Leary (Australia)

22 September 2006; 20:00	Queensland Roar	0–0	Adelaide United	Suncorp Stadium
		(Report) (Summary)		Attendance: 16,143; Referee: Matthew Breeze (Australia)

2 October 2006; 16:30	Adelaide United	1–4	Sydney FC	Hindmarsh Stadium
	Nathan Burns 55'	(Report) (Summary)	Ruben Zadkovich 37'; Travis Dodd (og) 58'; Sasho Petrovski 80'; Benito Carbone 85'	Attendance: 15,119; Referee: Mark Shield (Australia)

6 October 2006; 19:30	Adelaide United	3–1	Central Coast Mariners	Hindmarsh Stadium
	Carl Veart 25'; Kristian Rees 58'; Nathan Burns 90+1'	(Report) (Summary)	Damian Mori 38'	Attendance: 10,493; Referee: Ben Williams (Australia)

15 October 2006; 17:00	Melbourne Victory	0–1	Adelaide United	Telstra Dome
		(Report) (Summary)	Greg Owens 83'	Attendance: 32,368; Referee: Matthew Breeze (Australia)

22 October 2006; 19:30	Adelaide United	4–2	New Zealand Knights	Hindmarsh Stadium
	Nathan Burns 23'; Carl Veart 36'; Bobby Petta 56'; Travis Dodd 84'	(Report) (Summary)	Noah Hickey 65'; Adam van Dommele (og) 72'	Attendance: 11,600; Referee: Angelo Nardi (Australia)

27 October 2006; 19:30	Newcastle United Jets	2–1	Adelaide United	EnergyAustralia Stadium
	Vaughan Coveny 26'; Nick Carle 89'	(Report) (Summary)	Carl Veart 37' pen	Attendance: 10,895; Referee: Matthew Breeze (Australia)

5 November 2006; 16:30	Adelaide United	3–2	Perth Glory	Hindmarsh Stadium
	Carl Veart 16' pen Greg Owens 24'; Matthew Kemp 57'	(Report) (Summary)	Mimi Saric 14'; Bobby Despotovski 45' pen	Attendance: 11,062; Referee: Matthew Breeze (Australia)

11 November 2006; 19:00	Queensland Roar	0–1	Adelaide United	Suncorp Stadium
		(Report) (Summary)	Travis Dodd 62'	Attendance: 14,154; Referee: Ben Williams (Australia)

19 November 2006; 17:00	Sydney FC	2–1	Adelaide United	Sydney Football Stadium
	Ufuk Talay 13'(pen); Marko Rudan 21'	(Report) (Summary)	Ross Aloisi 5'	Attendance: 14,308; Referee: Matthew Breeze (Australia)

25 November 2006; 19:00	Central Coast Mariners	2–0	Adelaide United	Bluetongue Central Coast Stadium
	Adam Kwasnik 56'; Stewart Petrie 59'	(Report) (Summary)		Attendance: 13,119; Referee: Mark Shield (Australia)

1 December 2006; 19:30	Adelaide United	1–3	Melbourne Victory	Hindmarsh Stadium
	Fernando 42'	(Report) (Summary)	Kevin Muscat 16' pen Danny Allsopp 61'; Fred 86'	Attendance: 16,378; Referee: Mark Shield (Australia)

10 December 2006; 18:30	Adelaide United	1–1	New Zealand Knights	Hindmarsh Stadium
	Greg Owens 72'	(Report) (Summary)	Gao Leilei 17'	Attendance: 11,548; Referee: Angelo Nardi (Australia)

15 December 2006; 19:30	Adelaide United	3–2	Newcastle United Jets	Hindmarsh Stadium
	Romário 15'; Fernando 60'; Greg Owens 78'	(Report) (Summary)	Mark Bridge 59'; Matt Thompson 67'	Attendance: 12,214; Referee: Mark Shield (Australia)

28 December 2006; 19:00	Perth Glory	0–0	Adelaide United	Members Equity Stadium
		(Report) (Summary)		Attendance: 8,226; Referee: Ben Williams (Australia)

4 January 2007; 19:30	Adelaide United	0–1	Queensland Roar	Hindmarsh Stadium
		(Report); Summary)	Reinaldo 52'	Attendance: 10,435; Referee: Matthew Breeze (Australia)

14 January 2007; 18:30	Adelaide United	1–0	Sydney FC	Hindmarsh Stadium
	Fernando 89'	(Report) (Summary)		Attendance: 14,704; Referee: Matthew Breeze (Australia)

21 January 2007; 19:30	Central Coast Mariners	1–3	Adelaide United	Bluetongue Central Coast Stadium
	Tom Pondeljak 77'	(Report) (Summary)	Nathan Burns 10', 49', 66'	Attendance: 8,128; Referee: Simon Przydacz (Australia)

==== Finals Series ====
28 January 2007 Major Semi Final	Adelaide United	0–0	Melbourne Victory	Hindmarsh Stadium
17:30				Attendance: 15,575; Referee: Simon Przydacz (Australia)

4 February 2007 Major Semi Final	Melbourne Victory	2–1	Adelaide United	Telstra Dome
18:00	Allsopp 48'; Robinson 90+2'		Dodd 4'	Attendance: 47,413; Referee: Mark Shield (Australia)

11 February 2007 Preliminary Final	Adelaide United	1–1 (a.e.t.) (4–3 p)	Newcastle United Jets	Hindmarsh Stadium
18:00	Veart 57'		Coveny 74'	Attendance: 13, 798; Referee: Matthew Breeze (Australia
	Penalties
	Diego (penalty scored); Owens (penalty scored); Alagich (penalty scored); Aloisi (penalty scored)		(penalty scored) Bridge; (penalty scored) Carle; (penalty scored) Thompson; (penalty missed) Coveny; (penalty missed) Musialik

18 February 2007 Grand Final	Melbourne Victory	6–0	Adelaide United	Telstra Dome
18:00	Thompson 21', 29', 40', 56', 73'; Sarkies 90+3'			Attendance: 55,436; Referee: Mark Shield (Australia)

=== AFC Champions League ===
==== Group stage ====
Team	Pld	W	D	L	GF	GA	GD	Pts
(South Korea) Seongnam Ilhwa Chunma	6	4	1	1	13	6	+7	13
(China) Shandong Luneng Taishan	6	4	1	1	12	8	+4	13
(Australia) Adelaide United	6	2	2	2	9	6	+3	8
(Vietnam) Gach Dong Tam Long An	6	0	0	6	4	18	−14	0

7 March 2007 1	Adelaide United (Australia)	0–1	(China) Shandong Luneng Taishan	Adelaide, Australia
		Report	Valkanis 47' (o.g.)	Stadium: Hindmarsh Stadium; Attendance: 7,645; Referee: Satop Tongkhan (Thailand)

21 March 2007 2	Gach Dong Tam Long An (Vietnam)	0–2	(Australia) Adelaide United	Tân An, Vietnam
		Report	Fernando 18'; Dodd 30'	Stadium: Long An Stadium; Attendance: 10,000; Referee: Ali Saleem (Maldives)

11 April 2007 3	Adelaide United (Australia)	2–2	(South Korea) Seongnam Ilhwa Chunma	Adelaide, Australia
	Fernando 48'; Djite 55'	Report	Kim 57'; Mota 75'	Stadium: Hindmarsh Stadium; Attendance: 9,093; Referee: Subkhiddin Mohd Salleh (Malaysia)

25 April 2007 4	Seongnam Ilhwa Chunma (South Korea)	1–0	(Australia) Adelaide United	Seongnam, South Korea
	Sung-Kuk 29'	Report		Stadium: Seongnam 2 Stadium; Attendance: 2,000; Referee: Muhsen Basma (Syria)

9 May 2007 5	Shandong Luneng Taishan (China)	2–2	(Australia) Adelaide United	Jinan, China
	Li 39'; Chang 56'	Report	Fernando 36' (pen.); Burns 48'	Stadium: Shandong Stadium; Attendance: 30,000; Referee: Khalil Al Ghamdi (Saudi Arabia)

23 May 2007 6	Adelaide United (Australia)	3–0	(Vietnam) Gach Dong Tam Long An	Adelaide, Australia
	Dodd 7', 22', 49'	Report		Stadium: Hindmarsh Stadium; Attendance: 6,917; Referee: Abdul Bashir (Singapore)
