= 2007 A-League Grand Final =

- Event: 2006–07 A-League
Melbourne Victory	Adelaide United
6	0
- Date: 18 February 2007
- Venue: Telstra Dome, Melbourne, Victoria, Australia
- Man of the Match: Archie Thompson, Melbourne Victory
- Referee: Mark Shield
- Attendance: 55,436

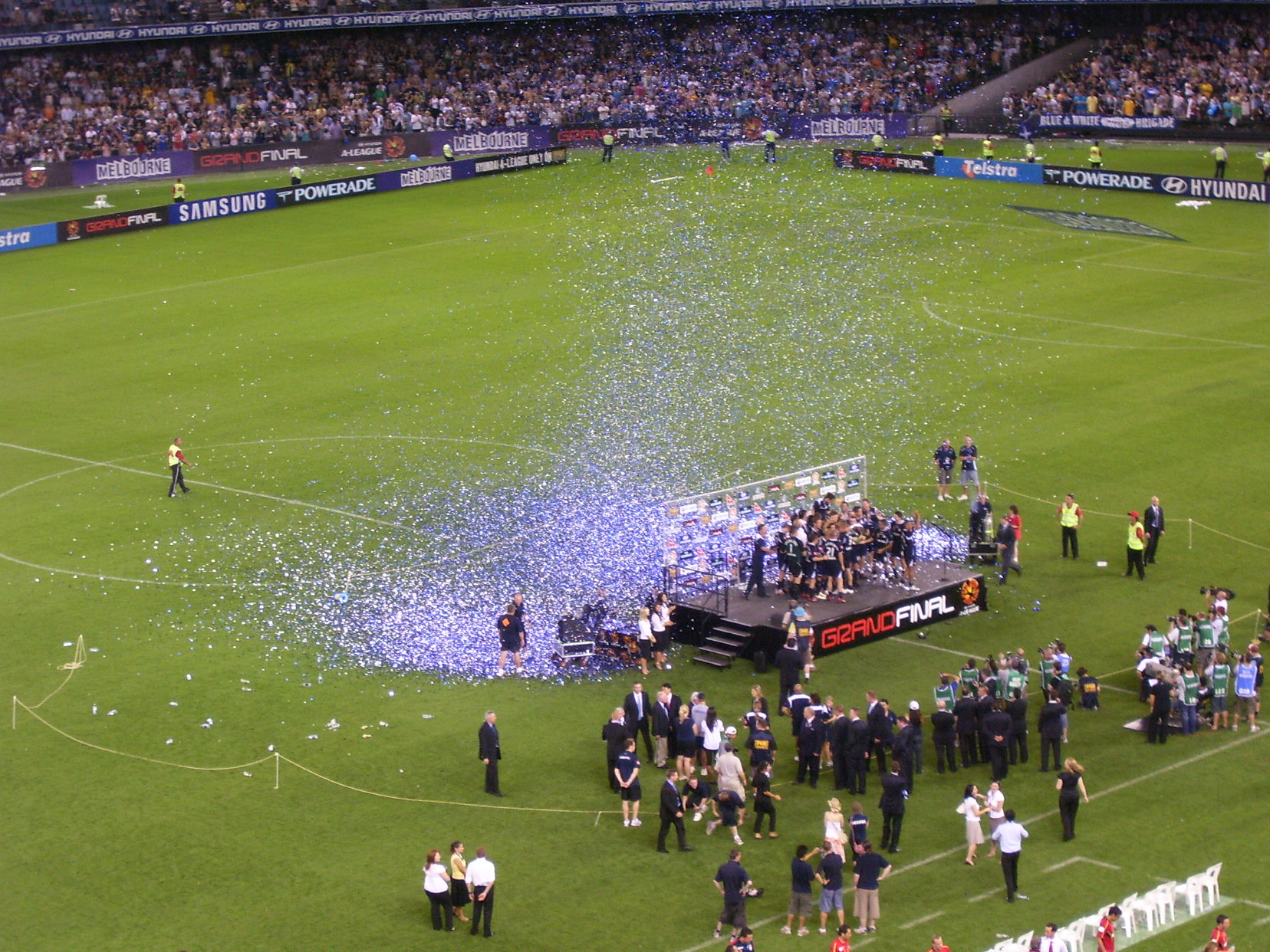
Melbourne Victory during the trophy ceremony

The 2007 A-League Grand Final took place at Telstra Dome in Melbourne, Australia, on 18 February 2007. The match was contested by premiers Melbourne Victory and Adelaide United, who had to play over half the game with ten men after their captain Ross Aloisi was sent off after 34 minutes. After the game, Adelaide coach John Kosmina heavily criticized the refereeing of the match and this, coupled with other issues, saw him forced to resign by the Adelaide board.

Melbourne prevailed 6–0 in the joint largest win in A-League history, and the greatest ever deficit in any Australian soccer Grand Final, including the old NSL. The match also set the largest sporting attendance at Docklands Stadium of 55,436 people. Archie Thompson scored five goals, only the sixth A-League hat-trick, and the most goals by an individual in any A-League match. This performance earned him the Joe Marston Medal.

== Route to the finals ==
Semifinals
Melbourne Victory	0	2
Adelaide United	0	1
Newcastle Jets	1	2
Sydney FC	2	0

Preliminary final
Adelaide United	1 (4)
Newcastle Jets	1 (3)

Final
Melbourne Victory	6
Adelaide United	0

== Match ==
=== Details ===
18 February 2007
18:00 AEDT

Melbourne Victory	6–0	Adelaide United
Thompson 20', 29', 39', 56', 72'; Sarkies 93+'	Reports

Etihad Stadium, Melbourne
Attendance: 55,436
Referee: Mark Shield

Melbourne Victory	Adelaide United

GK	1	(Australia) Michael Theoklitos
DF	16	(Australia) Simon Storey
DF	15	(Australia) Adrian Leijer
DF	12	(Australia) Rodrigo Vargas
DF	6	(Australia) Steve Pantelidis
MF	15	(Brazil) Fred
MF	2	(Australia) Kevin Muscat (c)
MF	17	(Scotland) Grant Brebner	(substituted off) 59'
MF	14	(Australia) Adrian Caceres	(substituted off) 62'
FW	9	(Australia) Danny Allsopp
FW	10	(Australia) Archie Thompson	(substituted off) 90'
Substitutes:
GK	20	(Australia) Eugene Galekovic
MF	13	(Australia) Kristian Sarkies	(substituted on) 90'
MF	18	(Brazil) Alessandro
FW	23	(England) James Robinson	(substituted on) 62'
MF	24	(Australia) Leigh Broxham	(substituted on) 59'
Manager:
(Scotland) Ernie Merrick

GK	1	(Australia) Daniel Beltrame
DF	2	(Australia) Richie Alagich		(substituted off) 70'
DF	4	(Australia) Angelo Costanzo	(yellow card) 57'
DF	5	(Australia) Michael Valkanis	(yellow card) 57'
DF	12	(Australia) Greg Owens		(substituted off) 46'
MF	13	(Australia) Travis Dodd
MF	6	(Australia) Ross Aloisi (c)	(yellow card) 22' (yellow-red card) 34'
MF	26	(Brazil) Diego Walsh
MF	15	(Australia) Nathan Burns
FW	10	(Brazil) Fernando		(substituted off) 59'
FW	8	(Australia) Carl Veart	(yellow card) 68'
Substitutes:
GK	20	(Australia) Robert Bajic
DF	3	(Australia) Kristian Rees
DF	14	(Australia) Aaron Goulding		(substituted on) 46'
MF	21	(Australia) Jason Spagnuolo		(substituted on) 70'
FW	25	(Australia) Bruce Djite		(substituted on) 59'
Manager:
(Australia) John Kosmina

Joe Marston Medal:
Archie Thompson (Melbourne Victory)

Assistant referees:
Ben Wilson
Nathan Gibson
Fourth official:
Matthew Breeze

Match rules

- 90 minutes
- 30 minutes of extra time if necessary.
- Penalty shoot-out if scores still level.

A-League
2007 Champions

Melbourne Victory
First Title

=== Statistics ===
	Melbourne	Adelaide
Attempts at goal	22	14
Attempts on target	15	9
Attempts off target	6	5
Attempts - Woodwork	1	0
Keeper saves	5	3
Ball possession	51%	49%
Corners	5	5
Fouls committed	12	23
Offsides	4	1
Yellow cards	1	5
Red cards	0	1

== See also ==
- 2006–07 A-League
- List of A-League champions
