= 2003–04 Adelaide United FC season =

Adelaide United
2003–04 season
- Chairman: Basil Scarsella
- Manager: John Kosmina
- Stadium: Hindmarsh Stadium
- National Soccer League: 3rd
- National Soccer League finals series: Preliminary final
- Top goalscorer: League: Carl Veart (10); All: Carl Veart (12)
- Highest home attendance: 15,568 vs. Brisbane Strikers (17 October 2003)
- Lowest home attendance: 9,159 vs. Northern Spirit (10 December 2003)
- Average home league attendance: 12,643
- Biggest win: 3–0 vs. Brisbane Strikers (7 March 2004)
- Biggest defeat: 0–5 vs. Perth Glory (28 March 2004)

The 2003–04 season was the first in the history of Adelaide United Football Club since its establishment in 2003. The club participated in the National Soccer League for the first and only time.

== Players ==
=== Squad information ===
Note: Flags indicate national team as defined under FIFA eligibility rules; some limited exceptions apply. Players may hold more than one non-FIFA nationality.

No.	Pos.	Nation	Player
1	GK	AUS	David Scarsella
2	DF	AUS	Richie Alagich
4	DF	AUS	Aaron Goulding
5	DF	AUS	Michael Valkanis
7	MF	AUS	David Terminello
8	FW	AUS	Carl Veart
9	FW	NZL	Shane Smeltz
10	MF	AUS	Aurelio Vidmar
11	MF	AUS	Goran Lozanovski
12	MF	AUS	Shane Thompson
13	FW	TAH	Félix Tagawa

No.	Pos.	Nation	Player
14	MF	AUS	Sean Widera
15	MF	AUS	Aaron Westervelt
16	FW	AUS	Michael Brooks
17	FW	AUS	Mimi Saric
18	MF	AUS	Fred Agius
19	FW	AUS	Elias Demourtzidis
21	MF	AUS	Adriano Pellegrino
22	GK	AUS	Nick Crossley
23	MF	AUS	Nick Budin
24	MF	AUS	Matthew Kemp

== Transfers ==
=== Transfers in ===
No.	Position	Player	Transferred from	Type/fee	Contract length	Date	Ref
2	DF	Richie Alagich	Brisbane Strikers	Free transfer	1 year	July 2003	
6	MF	Ross Aloisi	(Italy) Pro Sesto	Free transfer	5 years	July 2003	
20	GK	Robert Bajic	(Australia) Rochedale Rovers	Free transfer	1 year	July 2003	
16	FW	Michael Brooks	(Australia) Para Hills Knights	Free transfer	1 year	July 2003	
23	MF	Nick Budin	(Australia) Adelaide City	Free transfer	1 year	July 2003	
22	GK	Nick Crossley	(Australia) Modbury Jets	Free transfer	1 year	July 2003	
19	FW	Elias Demourtzidis	Sydney Olympic	Free transfer	1 year	July 2003	
4	DF	Aaron Goulding	(Australia) Adelaide City	Free transfer	1 year	July 2003	
24	MF	Matthew Kemp	(Australia) Adelaide City	Free transfer	1 year	July 2003	
11	MF	Goran Lozanovski	(Australia) Adelaide City	Free transfer	1 year	July 2003	
21	MF	Adriano Pellegrino	(Australia) Adelaide City	Free transfer	1 year	July 2003	
3	DF	Kristian Rees	(Australia) Adelaide City	Free transfer	1 year	July 2003	
17	FW	Mimi Saric	(Australia) Adelaide City	Free transfer	1 year	July 2003	
1	GK	David Scarsella	(Australia) Adelaide City	Free transfer	1 year	July 2003	
9	FW	(New Zealand) Shane Smeltz	(Australia) Adelaide City	Free transfer	1 year	July 2003	
13	FW	(French Polynesia) Félix Tagawa	Brisbane Strikers	Free transfer	1 year	July 2003	
7	MF	David Terminello	(Australia) Adelaide City	Free transfer	1 year	July 2003	
5	DF	Michael Valkanis	(Australia) Adelaide City	Free transfer	1 year	July 2003	
8	FW	Carl Veart	(Australia) Adelaide City	Free transfer	1 year	July 2003	
10	FW	Aurelio Vidmar	(Australia) Adelaide City	Free transfer	1 year	July 2003	
15	MF	Aaron Westervelt	(Australia) Adelaide City	Free transfer	1 year	July 2003	
14	MF	Sean Widera	(Australia) Croydon Kings	Free transfer	1 year	July 2003	

=== Transfers out ===
No.	Position	Player	Transferred to	Type/fee	Date	Ref
13	FW	(French Polynesia) Félix Tagawa	(French Polynesia) A.S. Dragon	Free transfer	December 2003	
6	MF	Ross Aloisi	(Malaysia) Selangor	Free transfer	March 2004	
20	GK	Robert Bajic	(Australia) Enfield City	Free transfer	March 2004	
3	DF	Kristian Rees	(Australia) Modbury Jets	Free transfer	March 2004	

== Competitions ==
=== Overall record ===
Competition	First match	Last match	Starting round	Final position	Record							
Competition	First match	Last match	Starting round	Final position	Pld	W	D	L	GF	GA	GD	Win %
National Soccer League	17 October 2003	29 February 2004	Matchday 5	3rd	24	11	7	6	28	25	+3	45.83
National Soccer League Finals	7 March 2004	28 March 2004	Qualifying final	Preliminary final	4	2	0	2	6	10	−4	50.00
Total					28	13	7	8	34	35	−1	46.43

Source: Competitions

=== National Soccer League ===
==== League table ====
Pos	Team	Pld	W	D	L	GF	GA	GD	Pts	Qualification
1	Perth Glory (C)	24	18	3	3	56	22	+34	57	Qualification to Finals series
2	Parramatta Power	24	16	3	5	58	30	+28	51	Qualification to Finals series
3	Adelaide United	24	11	7	6	28	25	+3	40	Qualification to Finals series
4	Marconi Stallions	24	10	8	6	29	25	+4	38	Qualification to Finals series
5	South Melbourne	24	11	4	9	39	21	+18	37	Qualification to Finals series

Source: ozfootball.net
Rules for classification: 1) Points; 2) Goal difference; 3) Goals scored;
(C) Champions

Matchday	1	2	3	4	5	6	7	8	9	10	11	12	13	14	15	16	17	18	19	20	21	22	23	24	25	26
Ground	A	H	A	B	H	A	H	A	H	A	H	A	H	H	A	H	B	A	H	A	H	A	H	A	H	A
Result	D	L	W	✖	W	W	D	D	L	L	D	W	W	D	W	W	✖	L	D	D	W	L	W	W	W	L
Position	6	9	8	9	7	4	5	4	7	8	7	6	6	5	5	4	4	5	5	5	5	5	4	4	3	3

Source: WorldFootball.net
A = Away; H = Home; W = Win; D = Draw; L = Loss; = Bye

==== Matches ====
17 October 2003 5	Adelaide United	1–0	Brisbane Strikers	Adelaide
21:30 ACST	Veart 38'	Report		Stadium: Hindmarsh Stadium; Attendance: 15,568; Referee: Craig Zetter

24 October 2003 6	Newcastle United	2–3	Adelaide United	Newcastle
19:30 AEST	Griffiths 9'; Owens 16'	Report	Veart 64' (pen.), 78'; Vidmar 73'	Stadium: EnergyAustralia Stadium; Attendance: 3,005; Referee: Con Diomis

2 November 2003 7	Adelaide United	0–0	Sydney United	Adelaide
16:30 ACST				Stadium: Hindmarsh Stadium; Attendance: 14,413; Referee: Angelo Nardi

8 November 2003 8	Marconi Stallions	0–0	Adelaide United	Sydney
19:30 AEST		Report		Stadium: Marconi Stadium; Attendance: 1,820; Referee: Craig Zetter

16 November 2003 9	Adelaide United	1–4	Perth Glory	Adelaide
19:30 ACST	Kemp 19'	Report	Pondeljak 15', 90'; Mori 16'; Despotovski 49'	Stadium: Hindmarsh Stadium; Attendance: 13,096; Referee: Matthew Breeze

22 November 2003 10	South Melbourne	2–1	Adelaide United	Melbourne
19:30 AEST	Kovacevic 23', 61'	Report	Veart 70'	Stadium: Bob Jane Stadium; Attendance: 8,359; Referee: Simon Micallef

28 November 2003 11	Adelaide United	2–2	Wollongong Wolves	Adelaide
20:00 ACST	Valkanis 48'; Saric 81'		Nwaogazi 20'; Blake 90'	Stadium: Hindmarsh Stadium; Attendance: 9,528; Referee: Perry Mur

30 November 2003 1	Sydney Olympic	0–0	Adelaide United	Sydney
18:00 AEST				Stadium: Jubilee Oval; Attendance: 2,370; Referee: James Lewis

6 December 2003 12	Football Kingz	1–3	Adelaide United	Auckland
18:00 NZDT	Ngata 80' (pen.)	Report	Pellegrino 50'; Smeltz 76'; Veart 86'	Stadium: Ericsson Stadium; Attendance: 1,121; Referee: Peter Green

10 December 2003 13	Adelaide United	1–0	Northern Spirit	Adelaide
19:30 ACST	Saric 8'	Report		Stadium: Hindmarsh Stadium; Attendance: 9,159; Referee: Craig Zetter

14 December 2003 14	Adelaide United	1–1	Sydney Olympic	Adelaide
19:30 ACST	Thompson 87'	Report	Cardozo 62'	Stadium: Hindmarsh Stadium; Attendance: 11,153; Referee: Eddie Lennie

20 December 2003 15	Parramatta Power	1–2	Adelaide United	Parramatta
18:30 AEST	Petrovski 44'	Report	Aloisi 10'; Veart 18'	Stadium: Parramatta Stadium; Attendance: 1,967; Referee: Angelo Nardi

28 December 2003 16	Adelaide United	2–1	Melbourne Knights	Adelaide
18:20 ACST	Veart 15'; Terminello 31'	Report	Trajanovski 4'	Stadium: Hindmarsh Stadium; Attendance: 13,032; Referee: Simon Micallef

7 January 2004 18	Brisbane Strikers	1–0	Adelaide United	Brisbane
20:30 AEST	Morley 13'	Report		Stadium: Perry Park; Attendance: 3,298; Referee: Perry Mur

11 January 2004 19	Adelaide United	0–0	Newcastle United	Adelaide
17:00 ACST		Report		Stadium: Hindmarsh Stadium; Attendance: 14,280; Referee: Peter Green

18 January 2004 20	Sydney United	1–1	Adelaide United	Sydney
18:30 AEST	Santalab 89'	Report	Alagich 76'	Stadium: Sydney United Sports Centre; Attendance: 2,065; Referee: Matthew Breeze

23 January 2004 25	Adelaide United	1–0	Football Kingz	Adelaide
20:00 ACST	Veart 58'			Stadium: Hindmarsh Stadium; Attendance: 13,212; Referee: Mark Shield

31 January 2004 22	Perth Glory	2–0	Adelaide United	Perth
19:00 AWST	Mori 30', 34'			Stadium: Members Equity Stadium; Attendance: 9,711; Referee: Angelo Nardi

6 February 2004 23	Adelaide United	2–0	South Melbourne	Adelaide
20:00 ACST	Budin 6'; Aloisi 31'			Stadium: Hindmarsh Stadium; Attendance: 12,463; Referee: Eddie Lennie

8 February 2004 3	Melbourne Knights	3–4	Adelaide United	Melbourne
18:00 AEST	Vasilevski 53'; Marinos 57', 90'	Report	Alagich 45'; Aloisi 62'; Brooks 65'; Veart 83'	Stadium: Knights Stadium; Attendance: 1,164; Referee: James Lewis

13 February 2004 24	Wollongong Wolves	0–1	Adelaide United	Wollongong
19:35 AEST			Brooks 80'	Stadium: WIN Stadium; Attendance: 3,010; Referee: Peter Green

20 February 2004 21	Adelaide United	1–0	Marconi Stallions	Adelaide
20:00 ACST	Veart 3'	Report		Stadium: Hindmarsh Stadium; Attendance: 13,690; Referee: Simon Micallef

25 February 2004 2	Adelaide United	0–2	Parramatta Power	Adelaide
20:00 ACST		Report	Elrich 5'; Milicic 52'	Stadium: Hindmarsh Stadium; Attendance: 12,125; Referee: Perry Mur

29 February 2004 26	Northern Spirit	2–1	Adelaide United	Sydney
17:00 AEST	Kwasnik 27', 69'		Vidmar 45'	Stadium: Pittwater Park; Attendance: 2,009; Referee: Matthew Breeze

=== N.S.L. Finals Series ===
7 March 2004 Qualifying Final (1st Leg)	Adelaide United	3–0	Brisbane Strikers	Adelaide
07:30 ACST	Veart 31'; Agius 67'; Brooks 90'	Report		Stadium: Hindmarsh Stadium; Attendance: 16,258; Referee: Ben Williams

13 March 2004 Qualifying Final (2nd Leg)	Brisbane Strikers	4–1	Adelaide United	Brisbane
09:00 AEST	Moon 45'; Rose 58'; Brain 82'; Grierson 87'	Report	Veart 65'	Stadium: Perry Park; Attendance: 2,790; Referee: Matthew Breeze

20 March 2004 Semi-Final	Adelaide United	2–1 (a.e.t.)	South Melbourne	Adelaide
09:30 ACST	Aloisi 71'; Alagich 105' (pen.)	Report	Curcija 12'	Stadium: Hindmarsh Stadium; Attendance: 16,558; Referee: Simon Micallef

28 March 2004 Preliminary-Final	Perth Glory	5–0	Adelaide United	Perth
06:45 AWST	Despotovski 10', 81'; Mori 51', 69'; Mrdja 88'	Report		Stadium: Subiaco Oval; Attendance: 17,524; Referee: Eddie Lennie

== Squad statistics ==
=== Appearances and goals ===
No.	Pos.	Name	National Soccer League		National Soccer League Finals		Total			
No.	Pos.	Name	Apps	Goals	Apps	Goals	Apps	Goals		
1	GK	(Australia) David Scarsella	20	0	4	0	24	0		
2	DF	(Australia) Richie Alagich	24	2	4	1	28	3		
4	DF	(Australia) Aaron Goulding	24	0	4	0	28	0		
5	DF	(Australia) Michael Valkanis	20+1	1	4	0	25	1		
7	MF	(Australia) David Terminello	8+8	1	3	0	19	1		
8	MF	(Australia) Carl Veart	23	10	4	2	27	12		
9	FW	(New Zealand) Shane Smeltz	4+3	1	0	0	7	1		
10	MF	(Australia) Aurelio Vidmar	23	2	4	0	27	2		
11	MF	(Australia) Goran Lozanovski	12+2	0	0	0	14	0		
12	MF	(Australia) Shane Thompson	7+4	1	1+1	0	13	1		
15	MF	(Australia) Aaron Westervelt	11+7	0	0+3	0	23	0		
16	FW	(Australia) Michael Brooks	0+5	2	0+3	1	8	3		
17	FW	(Australia) Mimi Saric	5+9	2	0	0	14	2		
18	MF	(Australia) Fred Agius	6+3	0	3+1	1	13	1		
19	FW	(Australia) Elias Demourtzidis	5+6	0	0+1	0	12	0		
21	MF	(Australia) Adriano Pellegrino	7+10	1	0	0	17	1		
23	MF	(Australia) Nick Budin	8+7	1	4	0	19	1		
24	MF	(Australia) Matthew Kemp	8	1	2+1	0	11	1		
Players sold but featured this season
3	DF	(Australia) Kristian Rees	23	0	3	0	26	0		
6	MF	(Australia) Ross Aloisi	22	3	4	1	26	4		
13	FW	(French Polynesia) Félix Tagawa	0	0	0	0				
20	GK	(Australia) Robert Bajic	4	0	0	0	4	0	0	0

=== Disciplinary record ===
Rank	Position	Name	National Soccer League		National Soccer League Finals		Total	
Rank	Position	Name	Booked	Sent off (straight red)	Booked	Sent off (straight red)	Booked	Sent off (straight red)
1	FW	(Australia) Aurelio Vidmar	2	1	0	0	2	1
2	FW	(Australia) Elias Demourtzidis	0	0	0	1	0	1
3	MF	(Australia) Ross Aloisi	6	0	1	0	7	0
4	MF	(Australia) Carl Veart	5	0	1	0	6	0
5	MF	(Australia) Nick Budin	4	0	1	0	5	0
6	DF	(Australia) Michael Valkanis	3	0	1	0	0	0
6	MF	(Australia) Aaron Westervelt	4	0	0	0	4	0
8	MF	(Australia) Goran Lozanovski	3	0	0	0	3	0
8	MF	(Australia) Adriano Pellegrino	3	0	0	0	3	0
8	DF	(Australia) Kristian Rees	3	0	0	0	3	0
11	MF	(Australia) Fred Agius	1	0	0	0	1	0
11	GK	(Australia) David Scarsella	1	0	0	0	1	0
11	MF	(Australia) David Terminello	1	0	0	0	1	0
11	MF	(Australia) Shane Thompson	1	0	0	0	1	0

=== Clean sheets ===
Rank	Name	National Soccer League	National Soccer League Finals	Total
1	(Australia) David Scarsella	9	1	10
2	(Australia) Robert Bajic	1	0	1
Total		10	1	11
