= List of Adelaide United FC players =

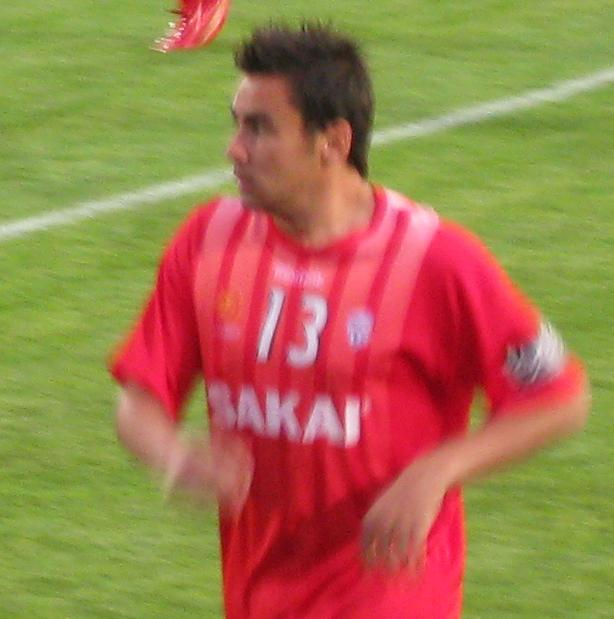
Travis Dodd is Adelaide United's third-highest all-time goalscorer.

Adelaide United Football Club, an association club based in Hindmarsh, Adelaide, was founded in 2003. They became the only South Australian member admitted into the A-League Men in 2005, after they spent their inaugural season in the National Soccer League. The club's first team has competed in numerous nationally and internationally organised competitions, and all players who have played in 100 or more such matches are listed below.

Eugene Galekovic holds the record for greatest number of appearances for Adelaide United. Between 2007 and 2017, he played 285 times for the club. Isaías and Ryan Kitto are the other players to have reached over 200 appearances. The club's goal scoring record is held by Craig Goodwin, who scored 60 goals in all competitions between 2014 and 2023.

== Key ==
- The list is ordered first by date of debut, and then if necessary in alphabetical order.
- Appearances as a substitute are included.
- Statistics are correct up to and including the match played on 20 November 2026. Where a player left the club permanently after this date, his statistics are updated to his date of leaving.

Nationality
Unless otherwise noted, the nationality of a player is determined by the country/countries which he has played for, or if said person has not played international football, their country of birth.
Position
Playing positions are listed according to the tactical formations that were employed at the time.
Club career
Club career is defined as the first and last calendar years in which the player appeared for the club in any of the competitions listed below.
Total appearances and Total goals
Total appearances and goals comprise those in the National Soccer League regular season and finals series, A-League Men regular season and finals series, Pre-Season Challenge Cup, Australia Cup, AFC Champions League, FIFA Club World Cup and 2005 Australian Club World Championship Qualifying Tournament.

== Players ==
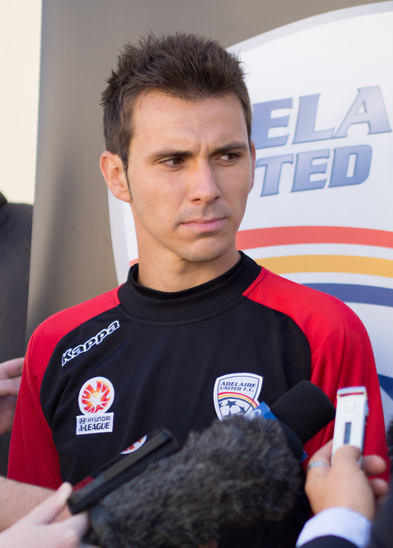
Isaías has the most appearances for a non-Australian player with 263.

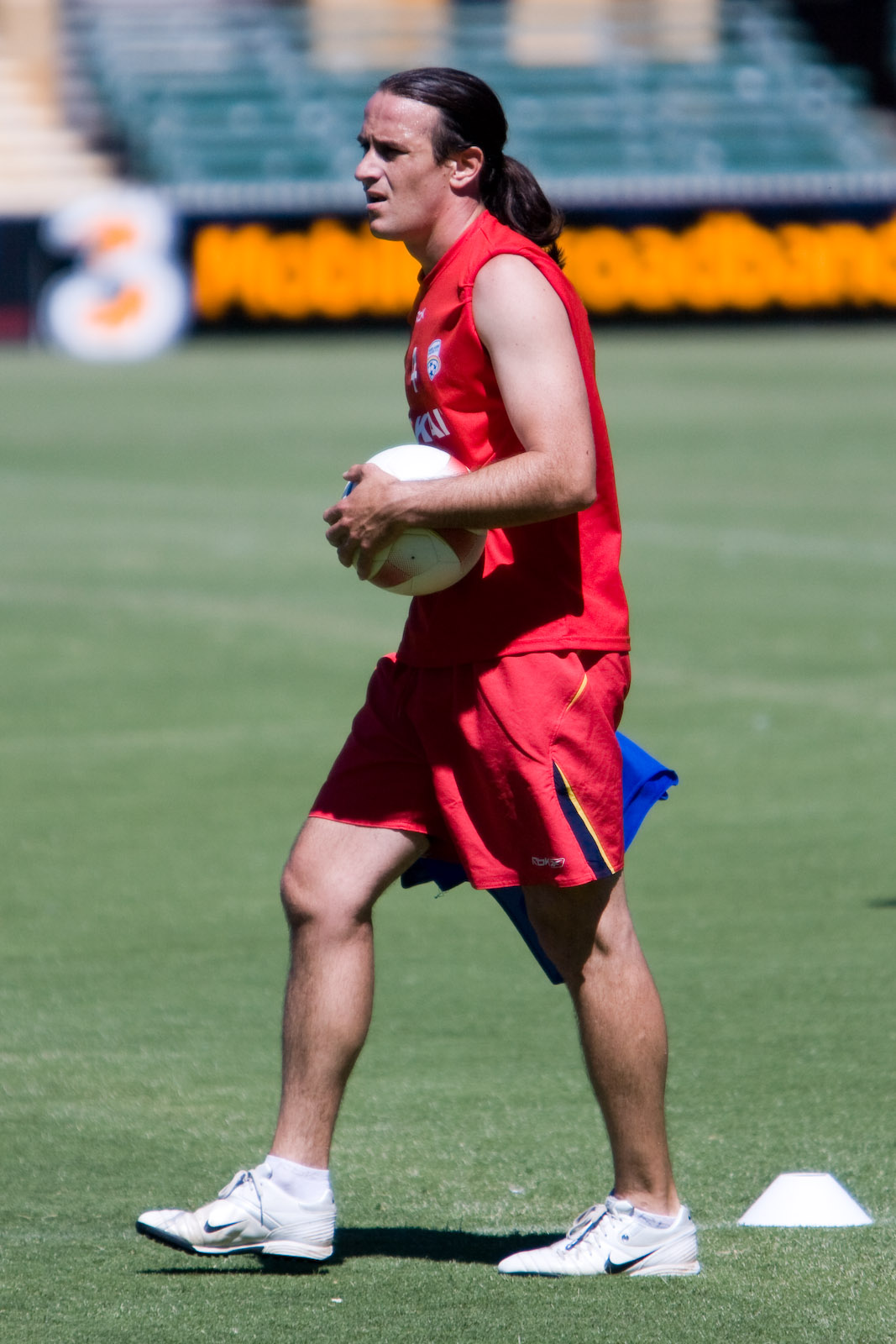
Early player Angelo Costanzo has played 107 times.

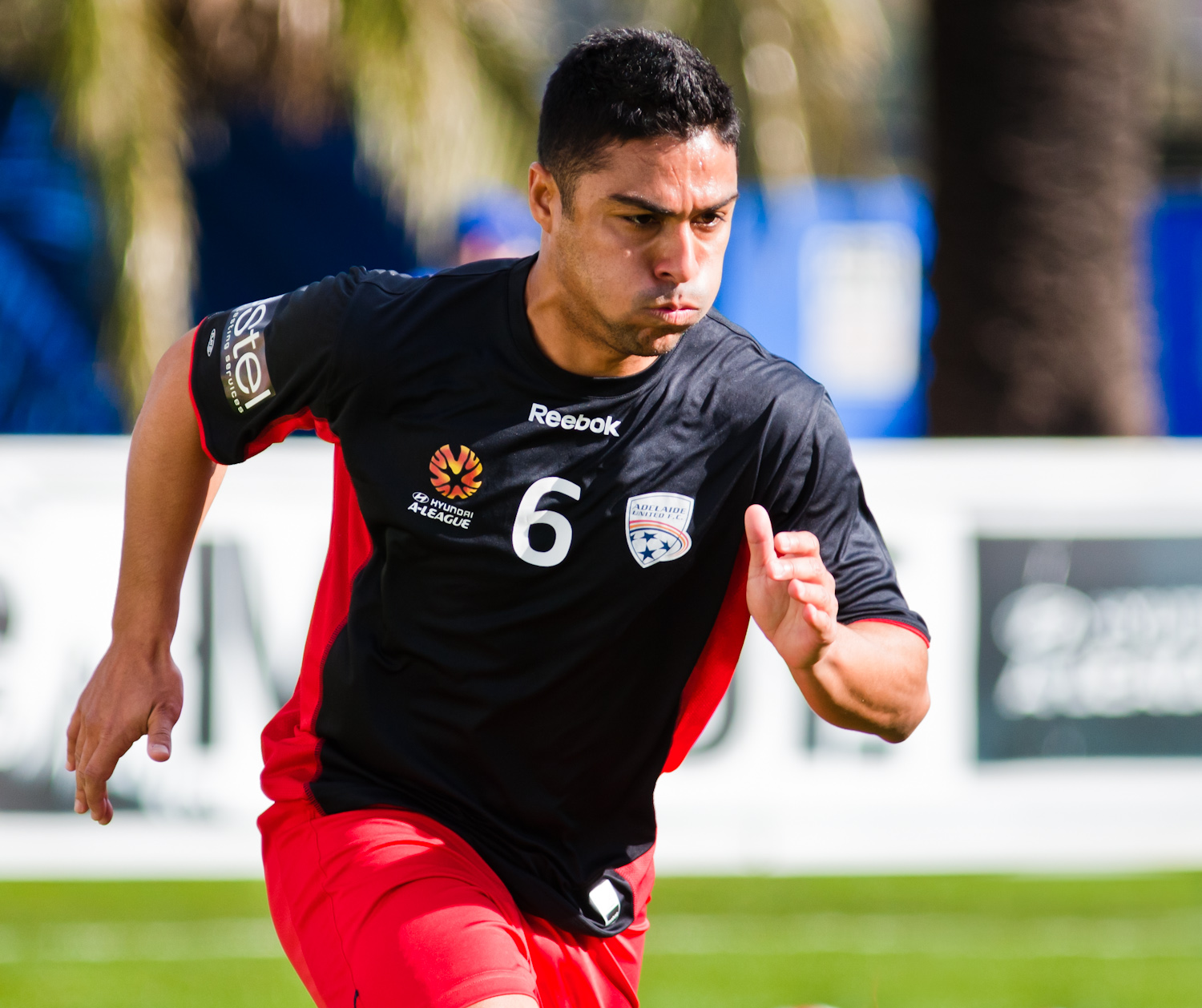
Cássio has the highest number of appearances for a Brazilian player with 158, scoring 11 goals.

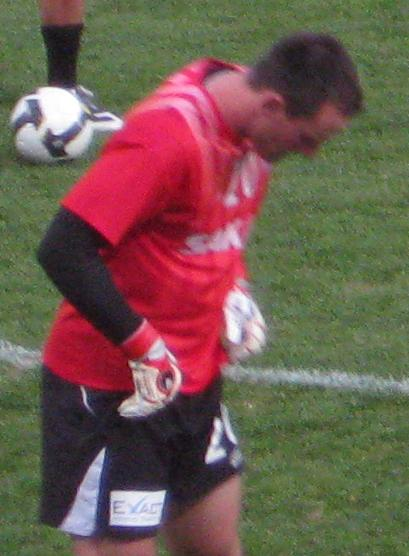
Eugene Galekovic has the most appearances as a goalkeeper for Adelaide United with 285 games played.

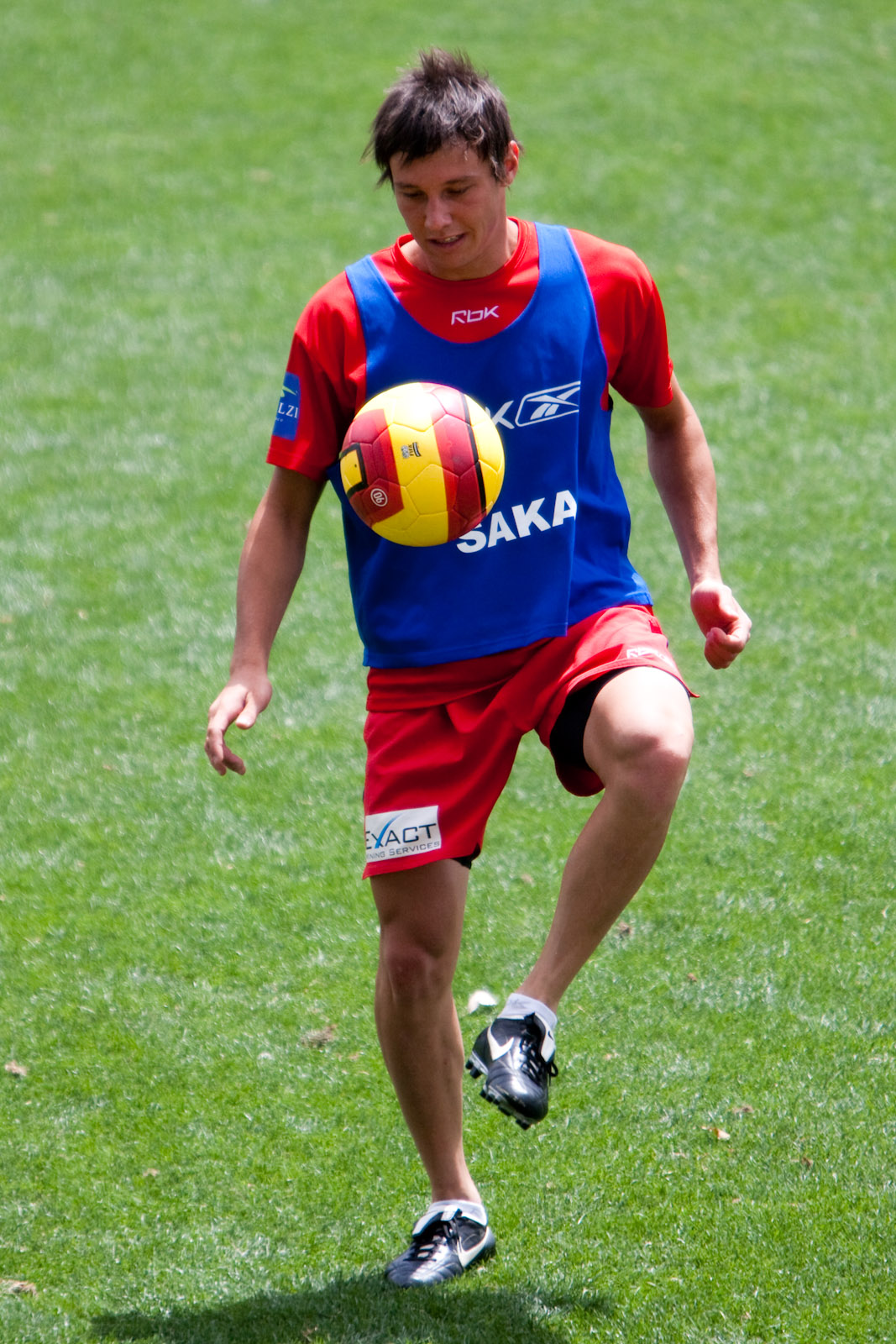
From 2007 to 2013, Fabian Barbiero played 116 times for Adelaide United with 9 goals.

Players highlighted in bold are still actively playing at Adelaide United.

List of Adelaide United FC players with 100 or more appearances
Player	Nationality	Pos	Club career	Starts	Subs	Total	Goals
Player	Nationality	Pos	Club career	Appearances			Goals
Richie Alagich	Australia	DF	2003–2008	113	8	121	7
Michael Valkanis	Australia	DF	2003–2009	98	6	104	6
Angelo Costanzo	Australia	DF	2005–2009	102	5	107	0
Travis Dodd	Australia	FW	2005–2011	166	17	183	41
Lucas Pantelis	Australia	FW	2005–2011	97	32	129	15
Robert Cornthwaite	Australia	DF	2005–2011	109	29	138	8
Bruce Djite	Australia	FW	2006–2008; 2011–2016	132	33	165	44
Cássio	Brazil	DF	2007–2013	145	13	158	11
Eugene Galekovic	Australia	GK	2007–2017	285	0	285	0
Fabian Barbiero	Australia	MF	2007–2013	74	42	116	9
Osama Malik	Australia	DF	2008–2009; 2011–2016	94	16	110	2
Michael Marrone	Australia	DF	2008–2010; 2014–2021	148	45	193	4
Nigel Boogaard	Australia	DF	2010–2015	109	5	114	4
Cameron Watson	Australia	MF	2010–2011	77	34	111	1
Marcelo Carrusca	Argentina	MF	2012–2017	111	12	123	27
Tarek Elrich	Australia	DF	2013–2018	108	6	114	3
Isaías	Spain	MF	2013–2019; 2021–2025	276	17	264	10
Jordan Elsey	Australia	DF	2013–2021; 2024–2025	123	22	145	7
**Ryan Kitto**	Australia	DF	2013–2015; 2016–	204	57	261	22
**Craig Goodwin**	Australia	FW	2014–2016; 2018–2019; 2021–2023; 2025–	181	13	194	67
Stefan Mauk	Australia	MF	2016; 2020–2022; 2024–2025	102	5	107	26
Nikola Mileusnic	Australia	FW	2016–2020	79	24	103	19
George Blackwood	Australia	FW	2017–2020; 2021–2023	67	46	113	25
Ben Halloran	Australia	FW	2018–2022; 2022–2024	129	12	141	28
Louis D'Arrigo	Australia	MF	2019–2023	83	23	106	5
**Ethan Alagich**	Australia	MF	2021–	84	24	108	8

== Captains ==
Ten players have captained Adelaide United since it was founded in 2003, first being Ross Aloisi, who captained the team for Adelaide United's first two seasons. The club's longest-serving captain is Eugene Galekovic, who captained the club for 7 years between 2011 and 2017. The current captain is Craig Goodwin, who is the first player to be selected captain on two occasions.

Years	Captain
2005–07	Ross Aloisi (AUS)
2007–08	Michael Valkanis (AUS)
2008–11	Travis Dodd (AUS)
2011	Jonathan McKain (AUS)
2011–17	Eugene Galekovic (AUS)
2017–19	Isaías (ESP)
2019–20	Michael Jakobsen (DEN)
2020–22	Stefan Mauk (AUS)
2022–23	Craig Goodwin (AUS)
2023–25	Ryan Kitto (AUS)
2025–	Craig Goodwin (AUS)
