= Carl Veart =

Australian soccer player

Personal information
- Full name: Thomas Carl Veart
- Date of birth: 21 May 1970 (age 56)
- Place of birth: Whyalla, South Australia, Australia
- Height: 1.82 m (6 ft 0 in)
- Position: Striker

Team information
- Current team: Adelaide United

Youth career
- Whyalla Croatia
- Salisbury United

Senior career*
Years	Team	Apps	(Gls)
1989–1994	Adelaide City	131	(54)
1994–1996	Sheffield United	68	(16)
1995–1997	Crystal Palace	62	(7)
1997–1998	Millwall	8	(1)
1998–2003	Adelaide City Force	145	(11)
2001	→ Playford City (loan)	7	(4)
2003–2007	Adelaide United	74	(24)
2004	→ Adelaide City (loan)	16	(3)
2007	Adelaide City	6	(7)
Total		517	(127)

International career
1992	Australia U-23		
1992–2000	Australia	18	(7)

Managerial career
- 2008–2012: Adelaide United Youth
- 2012–2019: FFSA NTC
- 2020–2025: Adelaide United
- 2025–: Australia U-17
Medal record
Representing Australia
Men's Association football
OFC Nations Cup
Runner-up	1998 Australia
- * Club domestic league appearances and goals

Thomas Carl Veart (/vɪərt/; born 21 May 1970), known as Carl Veart, is an Australian soccer manager and former player who is the head coach of the Australia men's national under-17 soccer team. As a player, Veart played over 300 games for Adelaide City in the National Soccer League before joining Adelaide United upon their formation, scoring the club's first ever goal and winning the 2005–06 premiership in the first season of the A-League. He enjoyed stints in the English First Division and Premier League with Sheffield United and Crystal Palace, and made 18 appearances for the Socceroos, scoring seven times. As a manager, he led Football Federation South Australia's NTC program from 2012 until 2019, and was Adelaide United's longest serving head coach; managing the club from 2020 until 2025.

== Early life ==
Veart was born on 21 May 1970 from the town of Whyalla in South Australia. Veart played various sports growing up, playing soccer, Aussie rules, basketball and cricket at home. Veart began playing soccer at the age of four and joined a local club in the under-9s. After progressing through youth level, Veart made his debut in senior soccer at the age of 15. At 17 years old, Veart initially pursued an apprenticeship before moving to Adelaide to pursue football. He spent his early senior years at Salisbury United for two years before moving to Adelaide City under the mentorship of Zoran Matić. Veart considers Matić as his biggest influence both as a player and coach.

== Club career ==
=== England ===
==== Sheffield United ====
On 22 July 1994, Veart moved to England to sign with Sheffield United for a transfer fee of £150,000. On 5 November 1995, he netted two goals to secure a 4–1 victory over Portsmouth. On 9 September, Veart scored the winning goal in the match against Norwich which saw five Norwich players booked.

On 18 January 1996, Veart scored the winning goal in a shock 1–0 win against Arsenal in the FA Cup third round. Veart scored through a header, assisted by Dane Whitehouse, to pass goalkeeper David Seaman in the 68th minute. By this time, he fell out with new manager Howard Kendall and soon departed to join former coach Dave Bassett at Crystal Palace.

==== Crystal Palace ====
On 27 December 1996, Veart scored his first goal for Palace, netting past Australian keeper Andy Petterson, in a 2–1 win against Charlton Athletic. Veart went on to score six goals in nine games, helping his side towards promotion to the Premier League and earned the nickname "goal machine" by the Palace faithful. In the 1997–98 season, after six appearances in the top flight and struggling for playing time, Veart was sold to Millwall for a fee of £100,000 in December 1997.

=== Adelaide United ===
After a five-year stint with former club Adelaide City, Veart joined Adelaide United in their inaugural season in the 2003–04 NSL season. He made his debut at Hindmarsh Stadium on 17 October 2003, scoring United's first goal in their history in a 1–0 win against Brisbane Strikers, in front of a sell-out crowd of 15,568. He helped his side to a top-four position on the table, scoring a brace in a 4–3 win over Melbourne Knights on 8 February 2004. Veart went on to score in both legs of the elimination final against Brisbane Strikers, importantly in the second leg where his side lost 4–1, clinching qualification on away goals to the semi-final. He finished his debut season as the club top goalscorer with 12 goals in 27 appearances.

Ahead of the newly established A-League, Veart scored the maiden goal of the competition in a 1–0 opening day victory over Newcastle Jets at EnergyAustralia Stadium. On 28 October 2005, he scored the only goal in a decisive win over Melbourne Victory to send his side to the top of the table. His side continue their dominance at the top, as Veart scored the equaliser in the 76th minute of a 2–1 away win against Newcastle on 2 December. At the end of the season, he was named Adelaide United's Player of the Season and nominated for the Johnny Warren Medal.

== International career ==
He made his debut for the Socceroos in 1992 and played 18 'A' matches, scoring 7 goals.

== Managerial career ==
Veart served as head coach of Adelaide United from 2020 through the end of the 2024–25 A-League Men season, becoming the club’s longest‑serving manager.

On 4 July 2025, Veart would be announced as the Australia Under-17 head coach.

== Career statistics ==
=== Club ===
Appearances and goals by club, season and competition
Club	Season	League			National cup (Note: Includes FA Cup)		League cup (Note: Includes NSL Cup, EFL Cup, and Federation Cup)		Other (Note: Includes Australian Club World Championship Qualifying Tournament, A-League Pre-season Challenge Cup, and AFC Champions League)		Total	
Club	Season	Division	Apps	Goals	Apps	Goals	Apps	Goals	Apps	Goals	Apps	Goals
Adelaide City	1989–90	National Soccer League	25	7	—		3	1	—		28	8
Adelaide City	1990–91	National Soccer League	21	8	—		0	0	—		21	8
Adelaide City	1991–92	National Soccer League	23	12	—		2	0	—		25	12
Adelaide City	1992–93	National Soccer League	31	13	—		4	3	—		35	16
Adelaide City	1993–94	National Soccer League	31	14	—		1	0	—		32	14
Adelaide City	Adelaide City total		131	54	—		10	4	—		141	58
Sheffield United	1994–95	First Division	39	11	1	0	1	0	—		41	11
Sheffield United	1995–96	First Division	29	5	?		?		—		29	5
Sheffield United	Sheffield United total		68	16	1	0	1	0	—		70	16
Crystal Palace	1995–96	First Division	15	1	?		?		—		15	1
Crystal Palace	1996–97	First Division	41	6	?		2	1	—		43	7
Crystal Palace	1997–98	Premier League	6	0	0	0	2	1	—		8	1
Crystal Palace	Crystal Palace total		62	7	0	0	4	2	—		66	9
Millwall	1997–98	Second Division	8	1	?		0	0	—		8	1
Adelaide City	1998–99	National Soccer League	30	5	—		—		—		30	5
Adelaide City	1999–2000	National Soccer League	33	2	—		—		—		33	2
Adelaide City	2000–01	National Soccer League	28	4	—		—		—		28	4
Playford City (loan)	2001	Premier League	7	4	—		2	0	—		9	4
Adelaide City	2001–02	National Soccer League	21	0	—		—		—		21	0
Adelaide City	2002–03	National Soccer League	33	0	—		—		—		33	0
Adelaide City	Adelaide City total		145	11	—		—		—		145	11
Adelaide United	2003–04	National Soccer League	27	12	—		—		—		27	12
Adelaide City (loan)	2004	Premier League	16	3	—		0	0	—		16	3
Adelaide United	2005–06	A-League	23	7	—		—		5 (Note: Includes two appearances in the Australian Club World Championship Qualifying Tournament and three appearances in the A-League Pre-season Challenge Cup)	0	28	7
Adelaide United	2006–07	A-League	24	5	—		—		6 (Note: Includes six appearances and three goals in the A-League Pre-season Challenge Cup)	3	30	8
Adelaide United	2007–08	A-League	0	0	—		—		3 (Note: Includes three appearances in the AFC Champions League)	0	3	0
Adelaide United	Adelaide United total		74	24	—		—		14	3	88	27
Adelaide City	2007	Super League	6	7	—		3	2	—		9	9
Career total			517	127	1	0	30	8	14	3	552	138

=== International ===
Appearances and goals by national team and year
National team	Year	Apps	Goals
Australia
Australia	1992	4	4
Australia	1993	5	1
Australia	1994	2	0
Australia	1995	2	1
Australia	1996	2	0
Australia	1997	0	0
Australia	1998	2	1
Australia	1999	—	
Australia	2000	1	0
Total		18	7

Scores and results list Australia's goal tally first, score column indicates score after each Veart goal.

List of international goals scored by Carl Veart
No.	Date	Venue	Opponent	Score	Result	Competition	Ref.
1	4 September 1992	Lawson Tama Stadium, Honiara, Solomon Islands	Solomon Islands	1–0	2–1	1994 FIFA World Cup qualification	
2	11 September 1992	Olympic Stadium, Papeete, Tahiti	Tahiti	2–0	3–0	1994 FIFA World Cup qualification	
3	20 September 1992	Perry Park, Brisbane, Australia	Tahiti	1–0	2–0	1994 FIFA World Cup qualification	
4	26 September 1992	The Gardens, Newcastle, Australia	Solomon Islands	4–1	6–1	1994 FIFA World Cup qualification	
5	6 June 1993	Olympic Park Stadium, Melbourne, Australia	New Zealand	1–0	3–0	1994 FIFA World Cup qualification	
6	21 June 1995	Hindmarsh Stadium, Adelaide, Australia	Ghana	1–0	1–0	Friendly	
7	2 October 1998	Suncorp Stadium, Brisbane, Australia	Tahiti	4–1	4–1	1998 OFC Nations Cup	

== Honours ==
Adelaide United

- A-League Premiership: 2005–2006
- A-League Pre-Season Challenge Cup: 2006

Adelaide City

- NSL Championship: 1991–1992, 1993–1994
- NSL Cup: 1989, 1991–1992

Australia

- OFC Nations Cup: runner-up 1998

== Managerial statistics ==
As of 3 January 2026

Team	Nat	From	To	Record				
Team	Nat	From	To	G	W	D	L	Win %
Adelaide United	(Australia)	2020	May 2025	157	66	39	52	42.04
Total				157	66	39	52	42.04

Awards
Preceded by Richie Alagich	Adelaide United Club Champion Award; 2005/06	Succeeded by Jason Spagnuolo
