= John Fusco (footballer) =

Australian association football player and manager

Personal information
- Date of birth: 1979 (age 46–47)
- Place of birth: South Australia, Australia
- Positions: Defender; midfielder

Team information
- Current team: Sturt Lions (Head Coach)

Senior career*
Years	Team	Apps	(Gls)
1996–1999	Adelaide City (State League)		
1999	Adelaide City Force (NSL)	1	(0)
2000	WT Birkalla		
2001	Adelaide Galaxy		
2002	Adelaide Raiders		
2003–2006	Cumberland United		
2007–2014	WT Birkalla		
2015–2025	Sturt Lions	153+	
Total		645	

Managerial career
- 2025–: Sturt Lions
- * Club domestic league appearances and goals

John Fusco (born 1979) is an Australian association football manager and former player. He competed in the National Soccer League (NSL) with Adelaide City Force and holds the record for the most senior appearances in South Australian state-based federation competitions, with 645 official matches.

== Playing career ==
=== National Soccer League ===
Fusco began his senior career with Adelaide City Force during the 1999–2000 NSL season. He made his league debut as a substitute in a 0–0 draw against Carlton SC at Hindmarsh Stadium in October 1999.

During the same period, Fusco also appeared in the National Youth League finals with Adelaide City Force.

=== State league career and milestone ===
After his tenure in the NSL, Fusco played in South Australia's state-based competitions, representing West Torrens Birkalla, Adelaide Raiders, Adelaide Galaxy, and Cumberland United.

In 2015, he joined Sturt Lions as a senior player and captain.

In 2021 Fusco broke the record for the most senior men's appearances in South Australian Federation Football. In 2025 he made his 645th and final official league appearance.

=== International representation ===
In 1999, Fusco was selected for the Australian University national team to compete at the 1999 Summer Universiade in Majorca, Spain. The squad participated in the 15-team men's football tournament, drawn against Spain, Morocco and Uruguay.

== Coaching career ==
Fusco was appointed as the head coach of Sturt Lions prior to the 2025 season. In 2025 the club won the State League 1 premiership and promotion back to the National Premier Leagues South Australia.

== Honours ==
=== Player ===
- South Australian State League
  - Premierships: Adelaide Raiders, Adelaide City, West Torrens Birkalla, Sturt Lions

=== Manager ===
- South Australian State League 1
  - Premiership: 2025 (Sturt Lions)
  - Promotion: 2025 (Sturt Lions)

=== Individual ===
- South Australian Federation appearance record (645 official matches)
