= Jack Smith Park =

Soccer facility in Adelaide, South Australia, Australia

Coordinates: 34.9738°S 138.5368°E

- Interactive map of Jack Smith Park
- Address: 6 Morphett Rd; Adelaide; South Australia

Tenant
- West Torrens Birkalla

The Jack Smith Park, formerly known as the Camden Sports Complex, is a soccer facility in Novar Gardens, an inner south-western suburb of Adelaide, South Australia.

The pitch contains artificial turf. West Torrens Birkalla have played at the ground since 1946.
