= Zachary Cairncross =

Australian professional footballer

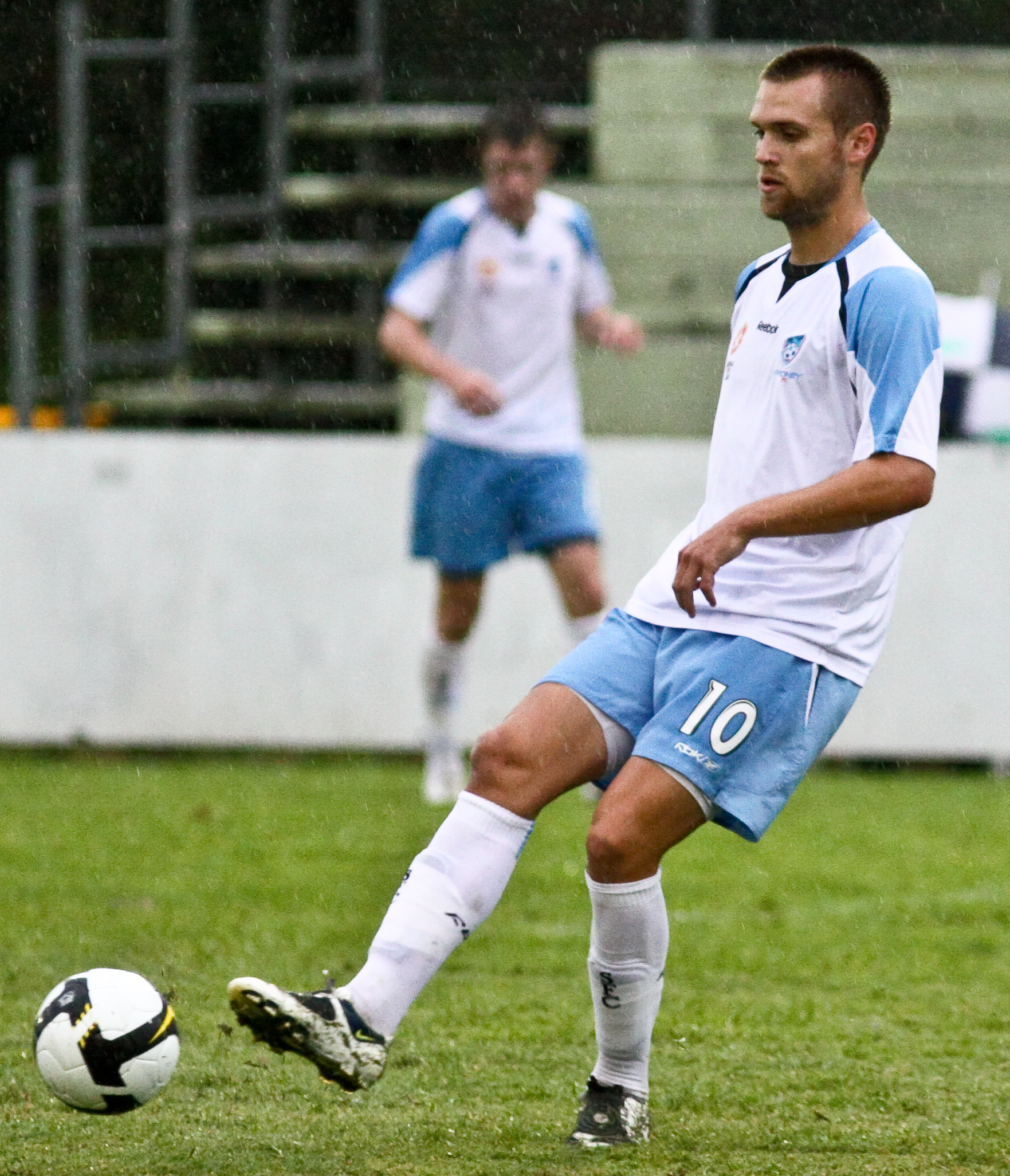
- Cairncross playing for Sydney FC youth

Personal information
- Full name: Zachary Cairncross
- Date of birth: 26 December 1989 (age 36)
- Place of birth: Liverpool, Sydney, Australia
- Position: Centre back

Youth career
- Blacktown City
- Marconi Stallions
- 2008–2010: Sydney FC

Senior career*
Years	Team	Apps	(Gls)
2007–2008	Marconi Stallions		
2009–2010	Sydney FC	2	(0)
2010	Blacktown City	24	(1)
2010	Oakleigh Cannons	0	(0)
2010–2014	Blacktown City	95	(6)
2014	Central Coast Mariners	0	(0)
2015–2019	Blacktown City	103	(3)
2020–2022	Marconi Stallions	17	(0)
2023	Bankstown City	12	(0)
- * Club domestic league appearances and goals as of 12 October 2023

Zachary Cairncross is an Australian professional footballer who plays as a defender for Bankstown City in the FNSW League One.

== Biography ==
On 10 January 2009 Cairncross made his debut for Sydney FC against Wellington Phoenix.

He has signed to play for the Oakleigh Cannons in the 2011 Victorian Premier League.

In 2014 Cairncross joined the Central Coast Mariners on an injury replacement contract for Brent Griffiths.

In 2023, Cairncross joined Bankstown City FC on a free.

== Honours ==
With Sydney FC:

- National Youth League Championship: 2008–2009
