= Aaron Westervelt =

Australian soccer player

Personal information
- Full name: Aaron Charles Westervelt
- Date of birth: 21 November 1979 (age 46)
- Place of birth: Adelaide, Australia
- Height: 5 ft 8 in (1.73 m)
- Position

Team information
- Current team: Andrews Farm soccer club

Youth career
- 1996–1997: AIS

Senior career*
Years	Team	Apps	(Gls)
1998–1999	Adelaide Sharks	34	(3)
2000	Playford City	19	(2)
2001–2002	Adelaide Galaxy	45	(26)
2003	Para Hills Knights	8	(1)
2003	Enfield City	11	(1)
2003–2004	Adelaide United	21	(0)
2005	Adelaide Galaxy	6	(0)
2005	Modbury Jets	10	(6)
2005–2006	Panachaiki	19	(0)
2006	Heidelberg United	5	(0)
2006–2007	Modbury Jets	31	(5)
2007	Seaford Rangers	2	(2)
2008	Playford City	1	(0)
2008	Adelaide Raiders	16	(9)
2011	West Adelaide	20	(8)
2012	Shepparton United	18	(17)
2014	Modbury Jets	28	(9)
2015	Adelaide Cobras	15	(5)
2015–2016	Adelaide Victory	18	(12)
2017	Salisbury United	10	(4)
2017	Adelaide Olympic	10	(0)
2018	Noarlunga United	21	(7)
2019	Elizabeth Vale	16	(2)
2020	Gawler Eagles	7	(3)
2020	Adelaide Croatia SAASL	10	(3)
2021	One Tree Hill	15	(17)
2022	Brahma Lodge	11	(1)
2026	Andrews Farm	6	(11)

Managerial career
- 2018–2018: Noarlunga United
- 2026–2029: Andrews Farm
- * Club domestic league appearances and goals as of 19 August 2022

Aaron Westervelt (born 21 November 1979) is an Australian football (soccer) player who plays as a central midfielder for Adelaide Victory FC in the National Premier Leagues State League.

== Club career ==
In 2011, he won the Milan Ivanovic medal for best player in the FFSA State League.
