= Dez Giraldi =

Australian soccer player (born 1986)

Personal information
- Full name: Dezmon Wallace Giraldi
- Date of birth: 24 March 1986 (age 40)
- Place of birth: Wollongong, Australia
- Height: 1.85 m (6 ft 1 in)
- Position: Striker

Youth career
- Corrimal SC
- Illawarra
- 1994: Wollongong Wolves
- AIS

Senior career*
Years	Team	Apps	(Gls)
2004–2006	Empoli	23	(0)
2005	→ Cuoiopelli Cappiano (loan)	26	(14)
2005–2006	→ Central Coast Mariners (loan)	0	(0)
2006	→ Adelaide United (loan)	1	(0)
2007–2008	Adelaide United	11	(1)
2008	Wollongong FC	5	(2)
2008	→ Sydney FC (loan)	3	(0)
2009–2010	Dandaloo FC		
2012	Tarrawanna		

International career^{‡}
2003	Australia U17	7	(2)
2006	Australia U23	3	(0)
- * Club domestic league appearances and goals as of 18 December 2007 ‡ National team caps and goals as of 18 December 2007

Dezmon "Dez" Wallace Giraldi (born 24 March 1986) is an Australian former soccer player.

== Club career ==
Giraldi signed with A-League club Adelaide United for the 2006–07 season, after a four-week stint with the Central Coast Mariners during the 2005-06 A-League season. He has represented Australia at Under-17 and Under-23 level, while also being part of Empoli's squad in the Italian Serie A. Giraldi gave up his squad number when Romario arrived in Adelaide so the Brazilian could wear the #11 he had worn all his career. Dez got the #23 he wanted when he first came to the club.

He was released by Adelaide United at the end of the 2007–2008 season. He moved to NSW Premier League club Wollongong Wolves before signing a contract with A-League club Sydney FC to replace the injured Brendon Santalab. In an interview, Giraldi spoke about anxiety, which he had experienced.
