= Fernando Rech =

Brazilian footballer (born 1974)

Fernando
Personal information
- Full name: Fernando Rech
- Date of birth: 13 March 1974 (age 52)
- Place of birth: Caxias do Sul, Brazil
- Height: 1.84 m (6 ft 1/2 in)
- Position: Forward

Senior career*
Years	Team	Apps	(Gls)
1994	Juventude	2	(0)
1995	Olaria	?	(?)
1995	Guarani Venâcio Aires	?	(?)
1996	Juventude	19	(7)
1997	Palmeiras	1	(0)
1997	Yokohama Flügels	14	(5)
1998	Internacional	?	(?)
1999	Juventude	?	(?)
2000–2003	Brisbane Strikers	68	(28)
2003–2004	Parramatta Power	21	(9)
2004–2005	Esportivo	?	(?)
2005–2007	Adelaide United	44	(15)
- * Club domestic league appearances and goals

Fernando Rech (born March 13, 1974, in Caxias do Sul, Brazil) is a Brazilian former footballer. He played either as a striker or an attacking midfielder.

== Life and career ==
He has retired from football, his last club being Adelaide United in the Australian Hyundai A-League. He is known as Fernando, which was the name he wore on the back of his shirt at Adelaide United (he had previously worn Rech on his shirt in Australia).

In season 2001/02, while playing for the Brisbane Strikers in the now defunct National Soccer League, he won the Johnny Warren Medal for player of the year.

== Club statistics ==
Club performance			League	
Season	Club	League	Apps	Goals
Brazil			League	
1995	Juventude	Série A	2	0
1996	Juventude	Série A	19	7
1997	Palmeiras	Série A	1	0
Japan			League	
1997	Yokohama Flügels	J1 League	14	5
Brazil			League	
1998	Internacional	Série A	0	0
1999	Juventude	Série A	8	0
2000	Etti Jundiai	Série A	0	0
Australia			League	
2000/01	Brisbane Strikers	National Soccer League	22	9
2001/02	Brisbane Strikers	National Soccer League	26	10
2002/03	Brisbane Strikers	National Soccer League	20	9
2003/04	Parramatta Power	National Soccer League	21	9
Brazil			League	
2005	Esportivo Bento Gonçalves		0	0
Australia			League	
2005/06	Adelaide United	A-League	18	7
2006/07	Adelaide United	A-League	17	6
Country	Brazil		30	12
Country	Japan		14	5
Country	Australia		124	50
Total			168	67

Preceded by Scott Chipperfield	Johnny Warren Medallist; 2001/02	Succeeded by Damian Mori
