= Mimi Saric =

Australian footballer (born 1983)

Personal information
- Full name: Mislav Saric
- Date of birth: 3 September 1983 (age 43)
- Place of birth: Požega, Croatia
- Height: 1.77 m (5 ft 9 1/2 in)
- Position: Attacking midfielder

Youth career
- Campbelltown City
- SASI
- AIS

Senior career*
Years	Team	Apps	(Gls)
2001	Adelaide Raiders	22	(4)
2002–2003	Adelaide City	34	(12)
2003–2004	Adelaide United	14	(2)
2004	→ Adelaide Raiders (loan)	5	(3)
2004–2005	HNK Cibalia		
2005–2006	Adelaide Raiders	37	(4)
2006–2007	Perth Glory	10	(1)
2007	Campbelltown City	13	(5)
2007–2008	FC PoPa	11	(7)
2008–2018	Adelaide Raiders	138	(32)

International career^{‡}
2001	Australia U-17	3	(4)
- * Club domestic league appearances and goals as of 3 September 2018 ‡ National team caps and goals as of 13 August 2016

Mislav "Mimi" Saric (born 3 September 1983 in Požega) is an Australian soccer player who played at national league level in Australia, Croatia and Finland. Saric spent the majority of his career in the South Australian state league, most notably with Adelaide Raiders. He represented Australia at under-17 level.

== Club career ==
Saric began his career in Adelaide, where he moved from Croatia as a child. After stints with Campbelltown City and the Australian Institute of Sport, he played for Adelaide Raiders in the South Australian state league before joining Adelaide City in the National Soccer League (NSL). Saric played 10 times for City in the NSL during the 2001–02 and 2002–03 NSL seasons. With the withdrawal of Adelaide City from the league, joined the newly-formed Adelaide United for the 2003–04 NSL season.

Saric spent time with Croatian team HNK Cibalia during the 2004–05 season, before returning to Adelaide Raiders in 2005.

In 2006, Saric joined Perth Glory in the A-League, playing 10 times in his last season in the Australian top tier.

In 2007, Saric moved back to South Australia to play with Campbelltown City.

Later in 2007, Saric went to Europe for a series of trials. A move to Drogheda United in Ireland stalled due to trouble gaining a work permit. He then trialled with Finnish team Porin Palloilijat and joined in August 2007.

From 2008, Saric played again with Adelaide Raiders, retiring after the 2018 season.
