= Jason Spagnuolo =

Australian soccer player (born 1984)

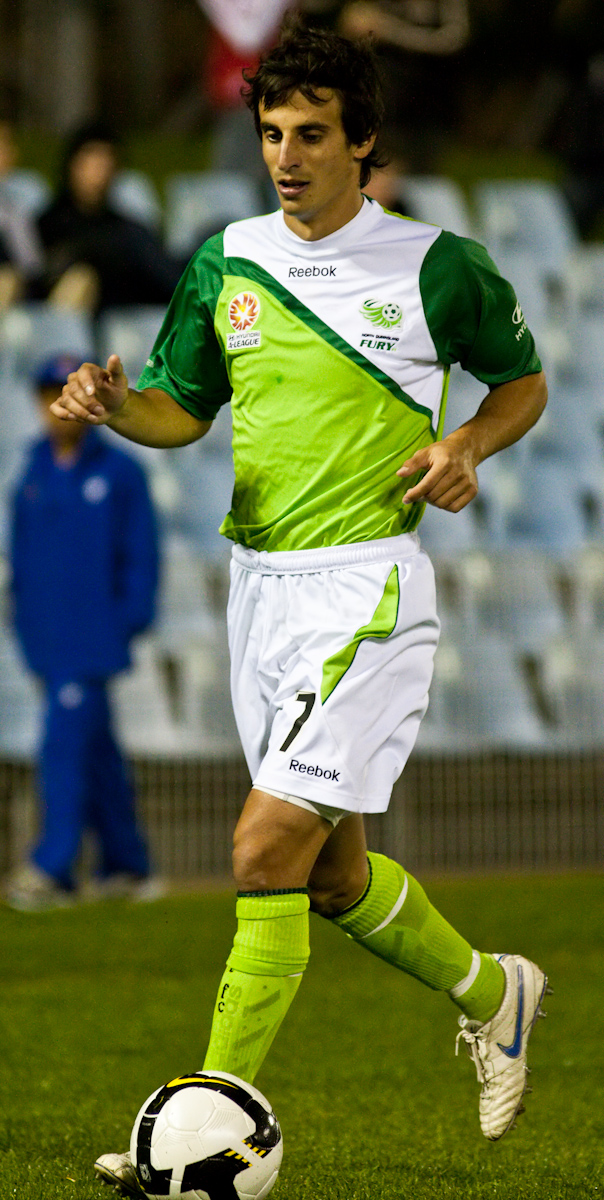
- Spagnuolo with North Queensland Fury in 2009

Personal information
- Full name: Jason Felice Spagnuolo
- Date of birth: 2 August 1984 (age 42)
- Place of birth: Adelaide, Australia
- Height: 1.73 m (5 ft 8 in)
- Position: Right winger

Youth career
- 1992–1996: Modbury Vista
- 1997–1998: Enfield City
- 1999: Campbelltown City
- 1999–2003: Adelaide City

Senior career*
| Years | Team | Apps | (Gls) |
| 2001–2003 | Adelaide City | 25 | (0) |
| 2004–2006 | MetroStars | 45 | (9) |
| 2006–2009 | Adelaide United | 44 | (1) |
| 2009–2011 | North Queensland Fury | 37 | (0) |
| 2011–2012 | Adelaide City | 20 | (1) |
- * Club domestic league appearances and goals as of 21 September 2011

Jason Spagnuolo (born 2 August 1984) is an Australian former professional footballer who last played for Adelaide City in the South Australian Super League.

== Club career ==
Spagnuolo attended Rostrevor College and graduated in 2002. Spagnuolo joined Adelaide United as injury cover towards the end of the 2005-06 season where he made one substitute appearance and earned his first professional contract the following season. He was Club Champion in the 2006–07 season after an impressive run of games seeing him contribute seven assists in 21 games. For the next two seasons, injuries restricted his game time and forcing him to play off the bench.

On 25 November 2008, Spagnuolo was released by mutual consent as he was seeking more game time. He signed for North Queensland Fury. After North Queensland Fury folded he returned home and signed with Adelaide City in 2011.

In 2012, he retired from professional/semi-professional football.
