= Richie Alagich =

Australian footballer (born 1973)

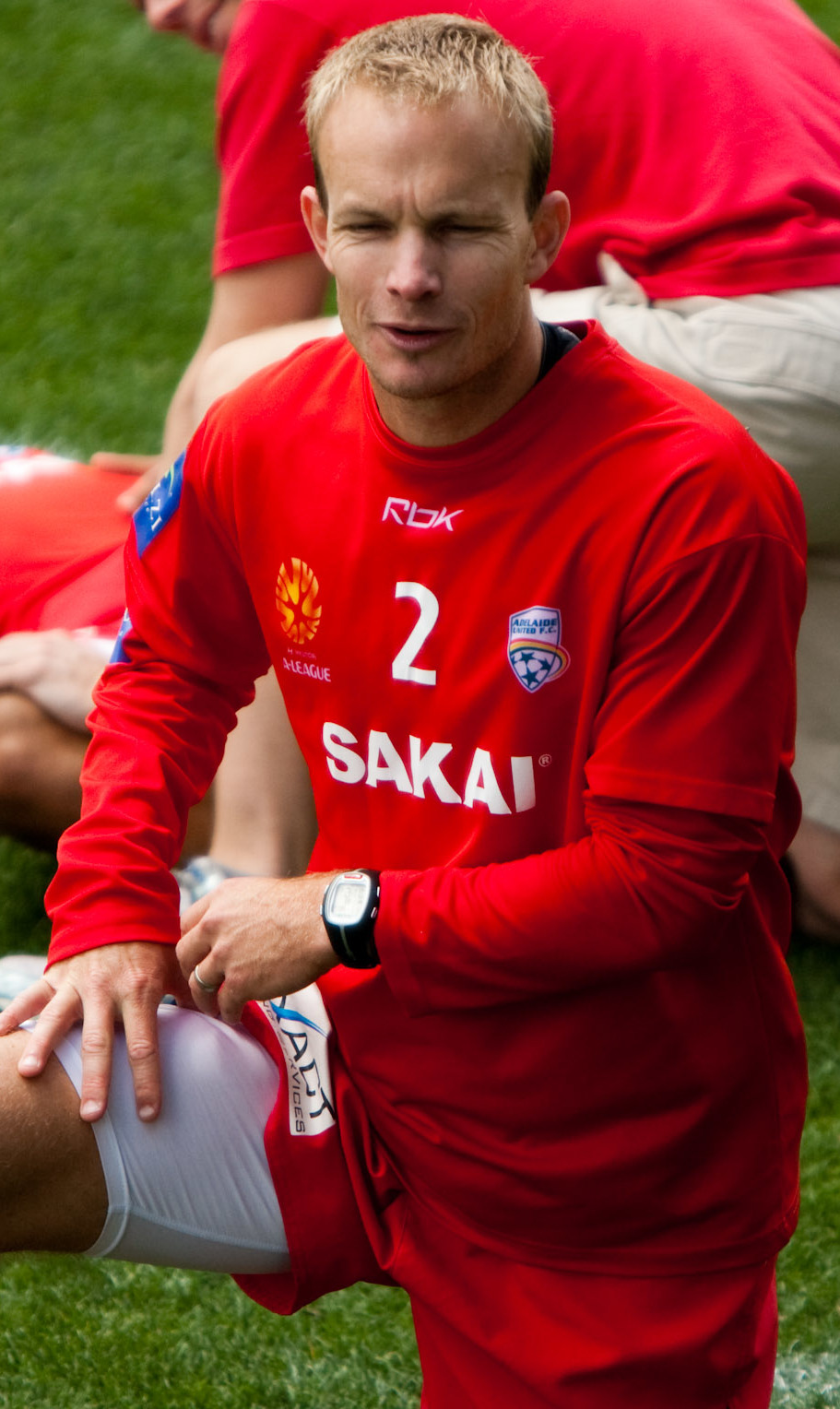
- Alagich in 2010

Personal information
- Full name: Richie Maya Alagich
- Date of birth: 30 October 1973 (age 53)
- Place of birth: Adelaide, Australia
- Height: 1.77 m (5 ft 9 1/2 in)
- Position: Right back

Youth career
- Port Adelaide

Senior career*
Years	Team	Apps	(Gls)
1990–1993	Port Adelaide Lions	56	(10)
1993–1999	West Adelaide	117	(4)
1995	→ Port Adelaide Lions (loan)	12	(2)
1997	→ Port Adelaide Lions (loan)	5	(0)
1999–2001	South Melbourne	14	(0)
2001	Adelaide Galaxy	7	(1)
2001–2003	Brisbane Strikers	43	(0)
2003	Port Adelaide Lions	6	(1)
2003–2008	Adelaide United	89	(5)
2004	→ Adelaide Raiders (loan)	16	(5)
2008–2010	Adelaide Raiders	44	(14)
Total		414	(42)

International career^{‡}
1996	Australia U-23	4	(0)

Managerial career
- 2008–2009: Adelaide United (W-League Asst.)
- 2009–????: SASI (Asst.)
- * Club domestic league appearances and goals as of 23 August 2011 ‡ National team caps and goals as of 23 August 2011

Richie Alagich (born 30 October 1973) is an Australian retired footballer.

== Club career ==
=== Early career ===
Born on 30 October 1973, in Woodville, South Australia, Alagich played representative football for his home state from 1985 through to 1991. He started his professional football career with the Port Adelaide Lions in the South Australia Super League in 1990 at the age of 16, continuing until 1993.

=== West Adelaide ===
Alagich then moved into the National Soccer League with West Adelaide SC, having already represented Australia at schoolboys and under-20 levels. Although he was unable to help West Adelaide reach the finals series that season, 1993 also marked his debut with the Australian under-23 team (the "Olyroos"). Alagich played regularly with the Olyroos up until 1996, and helped them qualify for the 1996 Olympics but did not play in the actual tournament where Australia were unable to progress past the group stage.

Domestically, the West Adelaide Sharks finished 5th to qualify for the NSL finals in 1994–95, with Alagich playing in both legs of their elimination final against Sydney United, which the Sharks lost 2–1 on aggregate. The following season West Adelaide missed the finals by a single point, and did not qualify for another one up until the club folded prior to the 1999–2000 season.

=== South Melbourne ===
The collapse of the Sharks forced Alagich to move to the South Melbourne Lakers, who had won the 1998–99 NSL Championship. South Melbourne finished first in the 1999 pre-season Tynan-Eyre Cup (held between Victorian NSL teams), but could not take part in the final of the tournament due to commitments to the 1999 Oceania Club Championship. A win in the Oceania Club Championship put South Melbourne into the 2000 FIFA Club World Championship, but they finished a disappointing 10th in the NSL before leaving for Brazil. Alagich played in one match of the tournament, South Melbourne's 1–3 loss to Mexican team Necaxa, and made only a further two substitute appearances for South Melbourne in 2000–2001 as they finished on top of the table before falling to the Wollongong Wolves in the Grand Final.

=== Brisbane Strikers ===
Alagich then moved to the Brisbane Strikers for the 2001–02 season, playing in 24 matches as the Strikers made it through to the Minor Semifinals. He played a further 10 matches for Brisbane in 2002–03,

=== Adelaide United ===
The withdrawal of Adelaide Force from the NSL and subsequent introduction of Adelaide United FC gave Alagich the opportunity to return to his home city in 2003–04, and he played 28 matches and scored 3 goals for the club, including a crucial 105th-minute penalty to put Adelaide into the preliminary final. The season featured Alagich's 200th NSL game, in the finals series against his former club Brisbane and at the end of the year his NSL tally stood at 202 matches for 7 goals. His efforts in the team's inaugural season earned him both the Club Champion and Players' Player awards. The cancellation of the NSL for 2004–05 meant that Alagich was forced to return to South Australian state football, and he played the 2004 season with the Adelaide Raiders.

When the A-League started in 2005–06, Alagich re-signed for Adelaide United, and played in 23 of their 24 matches as they won the inaugural Premiership and fell one game short of the Grand Final. The single match Alagich missed was due to suspension after he had the dubious honour of being the first player to be shown a red card in an A-League match, due to a foul in Adelaide's round 3 win over Melbourne Victory. Despite this, Alagich's solid season was recognised by Australian FourFourTwo magazine, as he was selected at right back in their "A-League Dream Team" from the inaugural season.

2006–07 saw Alagich play 21 games for United including the preliminary final at Hindmarsh Stadium against Newcastle Jets in which he scored in Adelaides penalty shootout win. He helped Adelaide reach the quarter-finals of the 2008 Asian Champions League in his last ever match with a 0–0 draw against Changchun Yatai; a first for any Australian club before he retired from professional football on 22 May 2008 after playing over 100 games for Adelaide United over his four-year spell.

==== Club statistics ====
(Correct as of 2 January 2009)

Club	Season	League^{1}		Cup		International^{2}		Total	
Club	Season	Apps	Goals	Apps	Goals	Apps	Goals	Apps	Goals
Adelaide United	2005–06	23	0	3	0	0	0	29	0
Adelaide United	2006–07	21	0	6	0	0	0	27	0
Adelaide United	2007–08	21	2	5	1	6	0	32	3
Adelaide United	2008–09	0	0	0	0	4	1	4	1
Total								92	4

^{1} – includes A-League final series statistics
^{2} – includes FIFA Club World Cup statistics; AFC Champions League statistics are included in season commencing after group stages (i.e. 2008 ACL in 2008–09 A-League season etc.)

== Coaching career ==
Alagich took up the role of Adelaide United women assistant coach working with Michael Barnett and has also been used as a scout during Adelaide's successful Asian Champions League campaign looking at teams such as Japan's Kashima Antlers. His first year of coaching saw Adelaide United ladies finish last in the W-League after failing to win any of the last 7 games.

== Personal life ==
Richie is the brother of Matilda, Dianne Alagich. His son Ethan also plays for Adelaide United.

== Honours ==
Adelaide United

- A-League Premiership: 2005–2006

South Melbourne

- Oceania Club Championship: 1999

Individual

- Adelaide United Club Champion: 2003–04

Awards
Preceded by Inaugural Recipient	Adelaide United Club Champion Award; 2003/04	Succeeded by Carl Veart
