= Greg Owens =

Australian soccer player

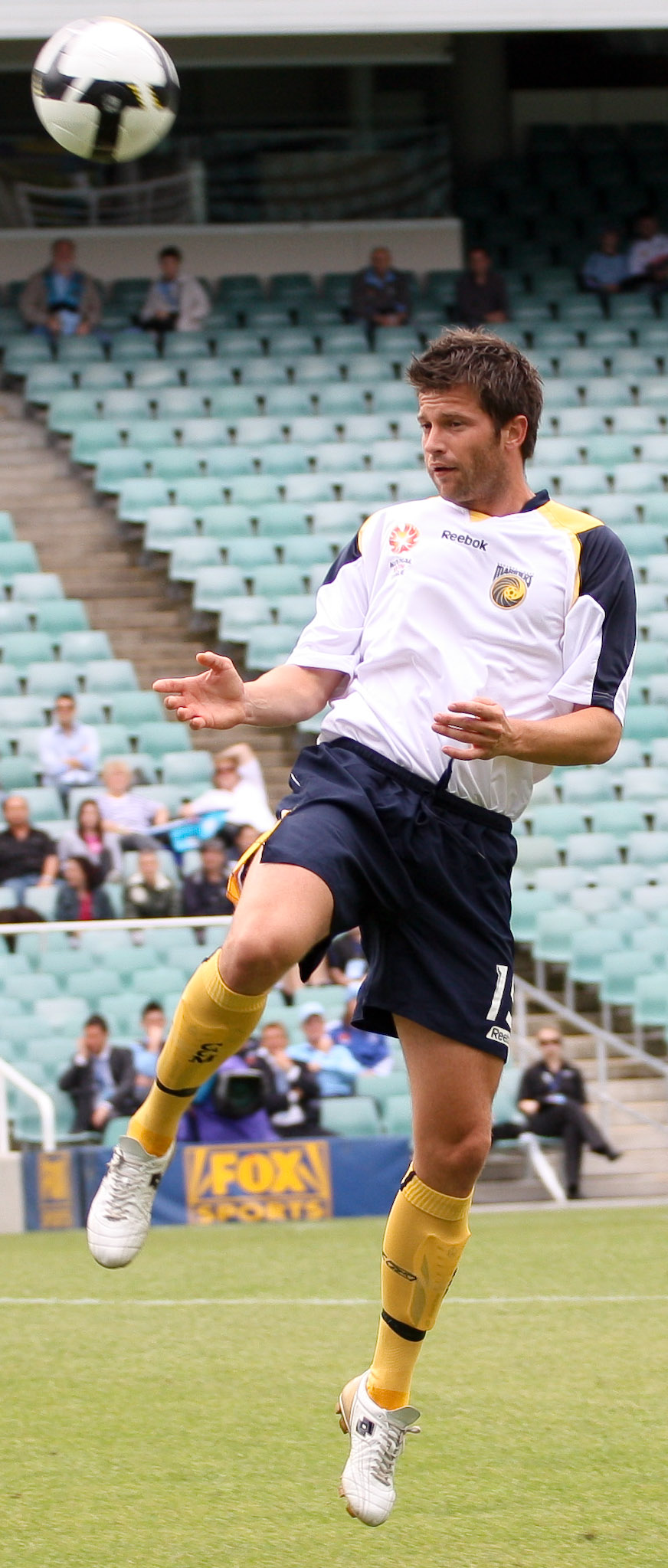

Personal information
- Full name: Gregory Owens
- Date of birth: 27 January 1981 (age 45)
- Place of birth: Bathurst, Australia
- Height: 1.83 m (6 ft 0 in)
- Position: Attacking midfielder

Youth career
- Adamstown Rosebuds

Senior career*
Years	Team	Apps	(Gls)
1997–2000	Newcastle Breakers	42	(5)
2000–2003	Sydney Olympic	58	(8)
2003–2004	Newcastle United	16	(2)
2004–2005	Sydney Olympic		
2005	Johor FC		
2005–2006	Adelaide United	2	(0)
2006	Sydney United		
2006–2007	Adelaide United	21	(4)
2007–2009	Central Coast Mariners	15	(2)
2009	Bankstown City Lions		

International career
2001	Australia U-20	21	(10)
Medal record
Representing Australia
Men's Association football
OFC U-19 Men's Championship
Winner	2001 Cook Islands/New Caledonia
- * Club domestic league appearances and goals as of 29 November 2008

Greg Owens (born 27 January 1981) is an Australian footballer who last played a midfielder for Bankstown City Lions in the NSW Premier League. He was born in Bathurst, New South Wales.

== Playing career ==
=== Club ===
Owens joined Newcastle Breakers for the 1998–99 National Soccer League, where he made his debut aged seventeen. He left the Breakers in September 2000, amid growing concerns about the team's stability.

Following unsuccessful trials in Denmark and at Southampton, Owens joined A-League side Adelaide United on a short-term, injury replacement contract during the finals series of the 2005–06 season. He rejoined Adelaide from Sydney United, on a longer-term contract in June 2006.

Owens left Adelaide after the 2006–07 A-League for personal reasons to return to his home state, New South Wales. He signed for Central Coast Mariners in March 2007. Ownes scored his first goal for the Mariners in a win over Perth Glory in November 2007.

Owens was released by the Mariners in May 2009.

== Honours ==
Olympic Sharks

- National Soccer League Championship: 2001–02

Adelaide United

- A-League Pre-Season Challenge Cup: 2006

Central Coast Mariners

- A-League Premiership: 2007–08

Australia U-20

- OFC U-19 Men's Championship: 2001
