= Robert Bajic =

Australian footballer (born 1977)

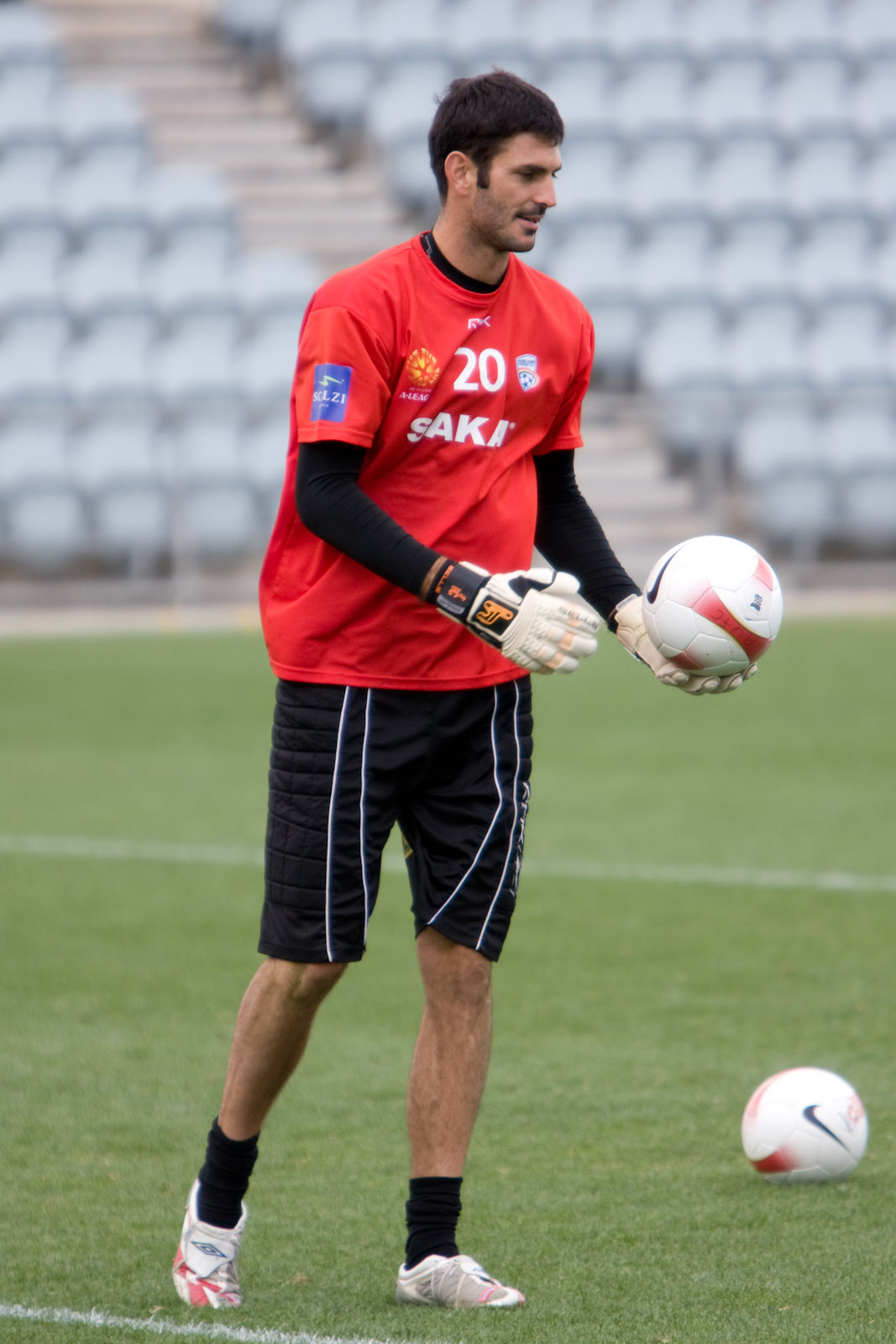

Personal information
- Full name: Robert Bajic
- Date of birth: 29 July 1977 (age 49)
- Place of birth: Whyalla, South Australia
- Height: 1.95 m (6 ft 5 in)
- Position: Goalkeeper

Youth career
- Adelaide Raiders

Senior career*
Years	Team	Apps	(Gls)
1994	Adelaide Raiders	14	(0)
1995–1997	Rocklea United		
1998–2002	Rochedale Rovers		
2003	Adelaide Raiders	0	(0)
2003–2004	Adelaide United	4	(0)
2004	Enfield City	12	(0)
2005–2008	Adelaide United	33	(0)
2006	→ Adelaide Galaxy (loan)	10	(0)
2009	Gold Coast United	0	(0)
2009–2010	Sông Lam Nghệ An		
- * Club domestic league appearances and goals as of 5 November 2011 ‡ National team caps and goals as of 18 December 2007

Robert Bajic (born 29 July 1977 in Whyalla, South Australia), is an Australian footballer.

== Club career ==
Bajic began his career in 1994 with Adelaide Raiders in the SA Premier League. The following year he moved to Queensland to play with Rocklea United FC in the Brisbane league before being promoted in 1998 to the Brisbane Premier League with the Rochedale Rovers. Bajic spent five seasons with Rochdale, but returned to his home state in 2003, re-signing with the Raiders to again play in the SASL. The withdrawal of Adelaide City from the National Soccer League gave Bajic the chance to move into the top Australian league with new club Adelaide United FC for the 2003–04 NSL season. Bajic, however, only played 4 matches that season, finding himself behind incumbent Adelaide City goalkeeper David Scarsella. The collapse of the NSL forced Bajic to move back to the SASL, playing for Enfield City Falcons in 2004, but with the launch of the A-League for 2005–06, Bajic was re-signed with Adelaide United.

Bajic was overlooked for much of the early 2005–06 season in favour of Daniel Beltrame, but made a total of 11 appearances of Adelaide's 27 league matches as they took the inaugural A-League Premiership. With 24 saves and two clean sheets in 2005–06, Bajic will remain with Adelaide United for the 2006–07 season.

In April 2008, Bajic was overlooked by Adelaide United as there were already two other goalkeepers that were currently in the squad (Daniel Betltrame and Eugene Galekovic). This meant that Bajic was released from his contract with the club once Adelaide would complete the 2008 Asian champions league group stage.

He was signed on an injury replacement loan for Gold Coast United custodian Vanstratten who had sustained a painful injury. He will now be the back up keeper to original backup keeper Scott Higgins.

== A-League career statistics ==
(Correct as of 26 January 2008)

Club	Season	League			Finals			Asia			Total		
Club	Season	Apps	Goals	Assists	Apps	Goals	Assists	Apps	Goals	Assists	Apps	Goals	Assists
Adelaide United	2005–06	11	0	0	0	0	0	-	-	-	11	0	0
Adelaide United	2006–07	15	0	0	0	0	0	3	0	0	18	0	0
Adelaide United	2007–08	7	0	0	-	-	-	-	-	-	7	0	0
Total											36	0	0

== Honours ==
With Adelaide United:

- (Australia) A-League Premiership: 2005–2006
