= Ross Aloisi =

Australian soccer player and manager (born 1973)

Personal information
- Full name: Ross Aloisi
- Date of birth: 17 April 1973 (age 53)
- Place of birth: Adelaide, South Australia
- Height: 1.78 m (5 ft 10 in)
- Position: Central midfielder

Youth career
- Adelaide City

Senior career*
Years	Team	Apps	(Gls)
1989–1991	Adelaide City	42	(12)
1992	Modbury Jets	6	(0)
1993	Enfield City Falcons	4	(3)
1993	FC Boom	4	(0)
1993–1994	Melbourne SC	13	(4)
1994	Thomastown Devils	4	(0)
1994–1997	West Adelaide Sharks	57	(8)
1997–1998	FC Aarau	34	(6)
1998–1999	FC Lorient	1	(0)
1999–2000	Grazer AK	20	(0)
2000–2002	Alzano	41	(0)
2002–2003	Pro Sesto	29	(3)
2003–2004	Adelaide United	26	(4)
2004	White City	9	(3)
2004	Selangor FC		
2005–2007	Adelaide United	50	(3)
2007–2008	Wellington Phoenix	13	(2)
Total		353	(48)

International career^{‡}
1989	Australia U-17		
1994–1996	Australia U-23	14	(4)
1994–1998	Australia	3	(0)

Managerial career
- 2010–2013: West Adelaide
- 2013–2015: Adelaide United Women
- 2023: Brisbane Roar
- 2023–2025: Shanghai Port (assistant)
- 2026: Zhejiang FC
- * Club domestic league appearances and goals as of 5 July 2014 ‡ National team caps and goals as of 15 May 2007

Ross Aloisi (born 17 April 1973) is a Australian football coach and former soccer player. He was the captain of Adelaide United in the Hyundai A-League – a team he guided to a minor premiership, a pre-season cup and two Asian Champions League campaigns. After leaving Adelaide united due to being red carded in the 2006 A-league grand final, he played for Wellington Phoenix in the A-League, where he was appointed their inaugural captain. Now, after his retirement as a football player, (having also featured as an assistant coach for Adelaide United), he was most recently one of the assistant coaches of J1 League club Yokohama F. Marinos. Aloisi was offered a contract for the next season after winning the league but didn't accept it.

== Club career ==
Aloisi was born in Adelaide, South Australia, the older brother of former Socceroo John Aloisi. He signed with National Soccer League club Adelaide City, for whom he made 6 appearances in the 1990–91 as the team finished third before losing in the preliminary final.

=== NSL ===
Aloisi continued with Adelaide City in 1991–92, and played 11 matches, scoring a goal in their preliminary final victory against South Melbourne FC as Adelaide went on to take the championship. Between seasons, he played for the Modbury Jets (1992) and Enfield City (1993) in the South Australia Super League, and after a final stint with Adelaide City in 1992–93 he moved to Europe with K. Boom F.C. in Belgium. He played just four matches for the club before returning to Australia to play for Brunswick Juventus in the 1993–94 NSL season.

Aloisi scored 4 goals in 13 matches as the team finished 13th of the 14 teams. The club merged with Box Hill Inter and the Bulleen Lions to become the Melbourne Zebras, and Aloisi made 8 appearances in 1994–95, scoring a goal in the Zebras' 2–0 victory over the Melbourne Knights in the Johnny Walker Cup. He signed on with the West Adelaide Sharks for the 1995–96 NSL season. Aloisi made 31 appearances for 4 goals as West Adelaide missed the finals by a single point, Aloisi played another 17 matches for West Adelaide, but again they missed the finals series, and he decided again to attempt to build a career overseas.

=== Europe ===
Aloisi signed with Swiss club FC Aarau, and played 38 matches for them in the 1997–98 season for 6 goals, and a further 2 matches in 1998–99, before moving to play for FC Lorient in France. Aloisi only played 1 match for FC Lorient over two seasons before moving on to Grazer AK in Austria's Bundesliga. Aloisi made 18 appearances for GAK in 1999–2000, and a further 2 in 2000–01, where the club reached the second round of the UEFA Cup. Moving to Italy, Aloisi made 41 appearances over two seasons for Alzano Virescit, before moving to Pro Sesto where he scored 3 goals in 29 matches in 2002–03.

=== Adelaide United ===
With the formation of Adelaide United in the NSL, Aloisi was lured to finally return home to Australia, and he became an integral member of the team, playing 26 games and scoring 4 goals as the new club reached the preliminary final. The collapse of the NSL, however, saw Aloisi move to Malaysia to play for Selangor FC helping them to finish second in the newly formed Malaysian Premier League. With the introduction of the A-League, Aloisi returned again to Australia and Adelaide United, signing with the team in November 2004. The retirement of 2003–04 captain Aurelio Vidmar saw Aloisi inducted as captain of the club for the first A-League season, and he played 23 of Adelaide's 24 matches, scoring 2 goals as the team won the inaugural A-League Premiership. Aloisi shared the LifeFM Adelaide Player of the Year award with Angelo Costanzo.

==== 2006–07 season ====
In the 2006–07 A-League season, Aloisi captained Adelaide United in a successful campaign that saw the side reach the Grand Final against Melbourne Victory on 18 February 2007 in Melbourne. Controversy followed Aloisi's appearance in that game, with him earning a red card in the 34th minute, leaving his side 1 man down for the rest of the match. United lost the Grand Final 6–0, a then record losing margin and aggregate score in a match in the short history of the A-League. Two months later Aloisi was sacked. John Kosmina (coach) had been asked to resign (sacked) by the Adelaide United board the Thursday following the grand final. Aloisi then left the club altogether and has promised in magazine interviews to one day "tell all".

Aloisi's allegedly unamicable departure was cited by brother John as being a principal reason why he rejected United's offer to become their marquee player for the 2007/2008 season. John also noted that Ross' departure lessened his desire to play for United, as his previously stated desire to play for United was based upon the incentive of finishing his career playing alongside his brother.

=== Wellington Phoenix ===
Aloisi was offered the role of captaining the new A-League franchise Wellington Phoenix, for the 2007–08 season. He scored twice in his only season with the Phoenix, before retiring at the end of the season.

Following retirement, Ross Aloisi joined Fox Sports as a commentator. He is also a columnist for Soccer International magazine and co-owns a ceramics business with his brother.

He now also co-hosts a weekly internet television show about football with John Kosmina, Two Up Front for AustraliaLiveTV.com.

== International career ==
At the age of 16 travelled to Scotland to play for Australia at the 1989 FIFA Under-16 World Championship. He made one appearance off the bench against the United States, playing 39 minutes in the 2–2 draw.

It was in 1994 that Aloisi broke into the Australian national team, playing 12 matches (for 2 goals) for the under-23 side (the Olyroos), and making his top-level debut for the Socceroos against Kuwait in a friendly in September that year. He played a second match for Australia against Japan five days later, earning a yellow card in the 0–0 draw. Aloisi played two matches for the Olyroos in 1995,

In early 1996, Aloisi participated in the Olyroos' qualifying campaign for the 1996 Summer Olympics, scoring 5 goals in 5 games as Australia finished on top of the Oceania group. Aloisi appeared in the away leg of the qualifying play-off tie against Canada, which Australia won 7–2 on aggregate to qualify for the Games. He played in all three of Australia's Olympic matches, but the team were knocked out in the group stages after losses to France and Spain.

In June 1998, Aloisi made his third appearance for the Australian national team, playing 16 minutes in a 7–0 friendly loss against Croatia.

In mid-1999, he returned home briefly to play two matches for Australia in Melbourne, friendlies against English club Manchester United.

== Managerial career ==
=== West Adelaide ===
Aloisi was appointed as coach of West Adelaide in 2010, two years after their revival. During his three years at the club, he got them promoted from the third division into the semi-professional top-tier South Australia National Premier League, including a 40-game undefeated streak.

=== Adelaide United Women ===
In August 2013, Aloisi entered women's soccer, and was appointed as the head coach of Adelaide United's women's team competing in the W-League. Following a season of improvement with the club, he was also appointed by Football South Australia as the head of South Australia's women's program.

=== Stints as assistant coach ===
In July 2015, Aloisi joined A-League club Brisbane Roar as an assistant coach under his brother John. In January 2019, 3 weeks after his brother, he left the club.

In October 2020, Aloisi returned to Adelaide United, this time as the assistant coach for the A-League team. He departed the club in March 2022 to join an Asian club.

In April 2022, Aloisi joined Yokohama F. Marinos as an assistant coach, under fellow Australian and former team-mate Kevin Muscat.

=== Brisbane Roar Men ===
In May 2023, Aloisi returned to a position of head coach, signing as the head coach of Brisbane Roar's team in the A-League Men, where he had previously spent four years as an assistant coach under his brother John. After just 9 games at the helm, Aloisi departed the Roar on 24 December.

=== Zhejiang FC ===
On 22 December 2025, Aloisi was named as the head coach of Chinese Super League club Zhejiang FC. After 1 year, the club announced Aloisi's departure after the 2026 season.

== Managerial statistics ==
All competitive league games (league and domestic cup) and international matches (including friendlies) are included.

As of 9 November 2026

Team	Nat	From	To	Record				
Team	Nat	From	To	G	W	D	L	Win %
West Adelaide	(Australia)	1 January 2010	30 June 2013	87	63	4	20	72.41
Adelaide United Women	(Australia)	1 July 2013	30 June 2015	24	6	5	13	25.00
Adelaide United Men	(Australia)	31 December 2021	8 January 2022	2	0	1	1	0.00
Brisbane Roar	(Australia)	1 July 2023	23 December 2023	12	8	2	2	66.67
Zhejiang	(China)	22 December 2025	9 November 2026	31	12	6	13	38.71
Career Total				156	89	18	49	57.05

== Honours ==
With Adelaide United:

- A-League Premiership: 2005–06

With Adelaide City:

- NSL Championship: 1991–92
- NSL Cup: 1991–92
