= Aaron Goulding =

Australian soccer player

Personal information
- Full name: Aaron David Goulding
- Date of birth: 29 April 1982 (age 44)
- Place of birth: Adelaide, Australia
- Height: 1.79 m (5 ft 10 1/2 in)
- Positions: Centre back; left back

Youth career
- Elizabeth Fields
- Munno Para: Para Hills Knights

Senior career*
Years	Team	Apps	(Gls)
1999	Para Hills Knights	4	(0)
2000–2003	Adelaide City Force	46	(0)
2000	→ Elizabeth City	20	(1)
2003-2004	Adelaide United	28	(0)
2004	Campbelltown City SC(loan)	14	(1)
2005–2007	Adelaide United	21	(0)
2006	→ Adelaide Galaxy (loan)	10	(0)
2007–2011	Para Hills Knights	84	(1)
2012	Modbury Jets	17	(0)
Total		236	(5)

International career^{‡}
1999	Australia U17	16	(4)
2001	Australia U20	2	(0)
Medal record
Men's football
Representing Australia
FIFA U-17 World Championship
Runner-up	1999 New Zealand
OFC U-19 Men's Championship
Winner	2001 Cook Islands/New Caledonia
- * Club domestic league appearances and goals as of 24 September 2012 ‡ National team caps and goals as of 23 August 2011

Aaron Goulding (born 29 April 1982 in Adelaide, South Australia, Australia) is an Australian footballer who last played for Parafield Gardens.

== Club career ==
In 2005, he played for Adelaide United in the A-League, having previously played for Adelaide City in the National Soccer League.

In 2007, after being released from Adelaide United he signed for local club Para Hills Knights.

== Honours ==
- FIFA U-17 World Championship: 1999 (runners-up)
- Under 20
- Under 23

Australia U-20

- OFC U-19 Men's Championship: 2001
