= 2009–10 Brisbane Roar FC season =

Coordinates: 27°27′53″S 153°0′34″E

Brisbane Roar
2009–10 season
- Chairman: Chris Bombolas
- Manager: see managers Frank Farina; Rado Vidošić; Ange Postecoglou
- A-League: 9th
- Finals: Did not qualify
- AFC Champions League: Did not qualify
- Top goalscorer: League: Sergio van Dijk (13); All: Sergio van Dijk (13)
- Highest home attendance: 19,902 vs Gold Coast United (8 August 2009)
- Lowest home attendance: 5,801 vs Adelaide United (12 December 2009)
- Average home league attendance: 8,850
Home colours	Away colours

The 2009–10 season was Brisbane Roar's fifth season in the A-League, Australia. For the first time, Brisbane Roar was not the sole representative from the state of Queensland, being joined by Gold Coast United and North Queensland Fury. The addition of the new clubs and a change of ownership of the Roar have led to the club changing its name from Queensland Roar to Brisbane Roar. The change of ownership also brought about notable changes in the clubs' administrative ranks. Peter McLennan became CEO in place of the retiring Lawrence Oudendyk, while Chris Bombolas took the role of club chairman in June, which had been vacant since the departure of John Ribot in March 2008. Brisbane Roars owners increased membership and ticket prices leading to a decrease in crowd figures for the 2009–10 A-league season.

== Managers ==
- (Australia) Frank Farina – (Suspended on 10 October 2009. Sacked on 14 October 2009)
- (Australia) Rado Vidosic – (10 October 2009 – 15 October 2009; caretaker)
- (Australia) Ange Postecoglou – (16 October 2009 – 3 May 2012)

== Squad lineup for 2009/10 ==
Note: Flags indicate national team as defined under FIFA eligibility rules; some limited exceptions apply. Players may hold more than one non-FIFA nationality.

No.	Pos.	Nation	Player
1	GK	AUS	Matt Ham
2	DF	AUS	Andrew Packer
3	DF	AUS	Luke DeVere (Youth)
4	DF	BEL	Pieter Collen
5	DF	AUS	Josh McCloughan
6	MF	AUS	David Dodd
7	FW	AUS	Michael Zullo (Junior Marquee)
8	MF	AUS	Massimo Murdocca
9	FW	IDN	Sergio van Dijk
10	MF	CRC	Steven Bryce
11	FW	BRA	Reinaldo

No.	Pos.	Nation	Player
12	DF	AUS	Matt Mundy
13	FW	BRA	Henrique
14	MF	AUS	Adam Sarota (Youth)
15	MF	AUS	Matt McKay (Captain)
17	MF	AUS	Mitch Nichols (Youth)
19	MF	AUS	Isaka Cernak (Youth)
20	GK	AUS	Griffin McMaster
21	FW	AUS	Thomas Oar (Youth)
22	DF	AUS	Ivan Franjic
23	FW	AUS	Tim Smits

== Transfers ==
Note: Flags indicate national team as defined under FIFA eligibility rules; some limited exceptions apply. Players may hold more than one non-FIFA nationality.

No.	Pos.	Nation	Player
4	DF	BEL	Pieter Collen (from K.S.K. Beveren)
12	DF	AUS	Matt Mundy (Promoted from Youth squad)
14	MF	AUS	Adam Sarota (Promoted from Youth squad)
16	DF	SCO	Bob Malcolm (from Motherwell)
22	DF	AUS	Ivan Franjic (from Oakleigh Cannons FC)
10	MF	CRC	Steven Bryce (from Universidad de Costa Rica)

No.	Pos.	Nation	Player
1	GK	AUS	Liam Reddy (to Wellington Phoenix)
4	DF	AUS	Craig Moore (to Kavala)
10	MF	SCO	Charlie Miller (to Gold Coast United)
12	FW	AUS	Tahj Minniecon (to Gold Coast United)
13	MF	AUS	Chris Grossman (to North Queensland Fury)
14	DF	AUS	Ben Griffin (to Mitchelton Football Club)
16	DF	KOR	Seo Hyuk-Su (to Brisbane Olympic)
16	DF	SCO	Bob Malcolm (to Dundee)
18	DF	AUS	Danny Tiatto (to Melbourne Knights)
??	FW	AUS	Robbie Kruse (to Melbourne Victory)

=== Injury replacement players used ===
The following players were signed by the club to cover for long term injuries and players unavailable to International commitments (such as the 2009 FIFA U-20 World Cup).

- Robbie Kruse – Signed to cover for injury to Massimo Murdocca (Signed for Melbourne Victory.)
- Ivan Franjic – Signed to cover for loss of Luke DeVere to 2009 FIFA U-20 World Cup. Upon DeVere's return, Franjic was instilled as the injury replacement player for Henrique
- Calum O'Connell – Signed to cover injury to Andrew Packer
- Mario Karlovic – Signed to cover for injury to Massimo Murdocca following the departure of Kruse.
- Vedran Janjetović – Signed to cover injury to Liam Reddy

== Pre-season ==
After last years initial success, the Roar Roadshow continues with fan days and trial matches against various clubs in the Brisbane area. However, drought-breaking rains in the South East took their toll, with multiple games cancelled or postponed due to waterlogged pitches. Queensland Roars Against Racism again, with Scottish giants Celtic F.C. becoming the highest profile club to ever challenge for the international invitational Translink Cup. The A-League Pre-Season Challenge Cup has been abolished, allowing A-League clubs to organize their own pre-season fixtures with one another.

Pre-Season Friendly; 12 May 2009	Grange Thistle (Australia)	Match Abandoned	(Australia) Brisbane Roar	The Grange
19:15 UTC+10				Stadium: Lanham Park

Pre-Season Friendly; 19 May 2009	Brisbane Wolves (Australia)	Match Postponed	(Australia) Brisbane Roar	Tingalpa
19:15 UTC+10				Stadium: Carmichael Park

Pre-Season Friendly; 26 May 2009	Redlands United (Australia)	0–1	(Australia) Brisbane Roar	Cleveland
19:15 UTC+10		(Report)	Henrique 11'	Stadium: Cleveland Showgrounds

Pre-Season Friendly; 2 June 2009	Brisbane Olympic (Australia)	0–6	(Australia) Brisbane Roar	Yeronga
19:15 UTC+10		(Report)	Murdocca 37' van Dijk 60'; Smits 65' 71' 85' (pen.); Dodd 68'	Stadium: Goodwin Park

Pre-Season Friendly; 7 June 2009	Sunshine Coast F.C. (Australia)	0–4	(Australia) Brisbane Roar	Gympie
14:30 UTC+10		(Report)	Kruse 10'; Murdocca 17' van Dijk 21'; Henrique 59'	Stadium: One Mile Ovals

Pre-Season Friendly; 9 June 2009	Peninsula Power (Australia)	1–0	(Australia) Brisbane Roar	Kippa-Ring
19:15 UTC+10	Gauci 90+1'	(Report)		Stadium: A.J. Kelly Park

Pre-Season Friendly; 14 June 2009	North Queensland Fury (Australia)	0–4	(Australia) Brisbane Roar	Mackay
19:00 UTC+10		(Report)	Murdocca 6'; Dodd 20' van Dijk 40'; Cernak 74'	Stadium: Sologinkin Oval

Pre-Season Friendly; 18 June 2009	Brisbane Roar (Australia)	1–2	(Japan) Japanese University XI	Bokarina
18:00 UTC+10	Smits 88'	(Report)	Mitsuhira 9'; Chiaki 86'	Stadium: Stockland Park

Pre-Season Friendly; 23 June 2009	Brisbane City (Australia)	Match Abandoned	(Australia) Brisbane Roar	Newmarket
19:15 UTC+10				Stadium: Spencer Park

Pre-Season Friendly; 28 June 2009	Brisbane Wolves (Australia)	1–4	(Australia) Brisbane Roar	Tingalpa
15:00 UTC+10; Rescheduled Fixture	Thorogood 35'	(Report)	Moore 45' van Dijk 53' 65' 90' (pen.)	Stadium: Carmichael Park

Pre-Season Friendly; 4 July 2009	Brisbane Roar (Australia)	2–1	(Australia) Brisbane Strikers	Herston
14:30 UTC+10	Henrique 39'; Packer 52'	(Report)	Hews 16'	Stadium: Ballymore

Translink Cup; 12 July 2009	Brisbane Roar (Australia)	0–3	(Scotland) Celtic	Brisbane
15:30 UTC+10		(Report)	Killen 39' 42'; Mizuno 50'	Stadium: Suncorp Stadium; Attendance: 31,340; Referee: Peter Green

Pre-Season Friendly; 19 July 2009	Brisbane Roar (Australia)	1–2	(Australia) Newcastle Jets	Brisbane
14:30 UTC+10	van Dijk 45'; Kruse (red card) 58'	(Report)	Hoffman 8'; Milicevic 59' (pen.)	Stadium: Ballymore Stadium; Attendance: 31,340; Referee: Chris Beath

Pre-Season Friendly; 25 July 2009	North Queensland Fury (Australia)	1–0	(Australia) Brisbane Roar	Townsville
15:00 UTC+10	Moore 90' (o.g.)			Stadium: Tony Ireland Stadium

Pre-Season Friendly; 28 July 2009	Rochedale Rovers (Australia)	0–1	(Australia) Brisbane Roar	Rochedale
19:15 UTC+10				Stadium: Underwood Park

== 2009–10 Hyundai A-League ==
Round 1; 8 August 2009	Brisbane Roar (Australia)	1–3	(Australia) Gold Coast United	Brisbane
19:30 UTC+10	van Dijk 90+1' (pen.)	(Report) (Summary)	Smeltz 17'; Culina 59'; Robson 90+3'	Stadium: Suncorp Stadium; Attendance: 19,902; Referee: Peter Green

Round 2; 15 August 2009	Melbourne Victory (Australia)	3–3	(Australia) Brisbane Roar	Melbourne
19:30 UTC+10	Hernández 33', 70'; Allsopp 63'	(Report) (Summary)	Tiatto 22' van Dijk 24' (pen.); Henrique 36'	Stadium: Etihad Stadium; Attendance: 18,603; Referee: Srebre Delovski

Round 3; 23 August 2009	Brisbane Roar (Australia)	1–1	(New Zealand) Wellington Phoenix	Brisbane
15:00 UTC+10	van Dijk 10'; Oar (yellow card) 86' (yellow-red card) 88'	(Report) (Summary)	Greenacre 85'	Stadium: Suncorp Stadium; Attendance: 7,084; Referee: Chris Beath

Round 4; 29 August 2009	Brisbane Roar (Australia)	1–0	(Australia) Central Coast Mariners	Brisbane
15:00 UTC+10	Moore 11'	(Report) (Summary)		Stadium: Suncorp Stadium; Attendance: 6,433; Referee: Ben Williams

Round 5; 5 September 2009	North Queensland Fury (Australia)	1–1	(Australia) Brisbane Roar	Townsville
19:30 UTC+10	Fowler 7'	(Report) (Summary)	Nichols 82'	Stadium: Dairy Farmers Stadium, Townsville, Queensland; Attendance: 7,173; Referee: Matthew Breeze

Round 6; 6 September 2009	Newcastle Jets (Australia)	0–3	(Australia) Brisbane Roar	Newcastle
17:30 UTC+10		(Report) (Summary)	Henrique 24'; Reinaldo 26'; Miller 70'	Stadium: EnergyAustralia Stadium; Attendance: 6,026; Referee: Ben Williams

Round 7; 20 September 2009	Brisbane Roar (Australia)	2–4	(Australia) Perth Glory	Brisbane
17:00 UTC+10	Henrique 50'; Coyne 64'(o.g)	(Report) (Summary)	McCloughan 1' (o.g); Srhoj 41'; Jelic 61'; Pellegrino 75'	Stadium: Suncorp Stadium; Attendance: 7,549; Referee: Chris Beath

Round 8; 27 September 2009	Brisbane Roar (Australia)	1–0	(Australia) Sydney FC	Brisbane
15:00 UTC+10	van Dijk 85'	(Report) (Summary)		Stadium: Suncorp Stadium; Attendance: 7,677; Referee: Srebre Delovski

Round 9; 3 October 2009	Melbourne Victory (Australia)	2–1	(Australia) Brisbane Roar	Melbourne
19:30 UTC+11	Ney Fabiano 3'; Leijer 72'	(Report) (Summary)	Reinaldo 11'	Stadium: Etihad Stadium; Attendance: 19,587; Referee: Srebre Delovski

Round 10; 11 October 2009	Brisbane Roar (Australia)	0–1	(Australia) Gold Coast United	Brisbane
16:00 UTC+10		(Report) (Summary)	Porter 31'	Stadium: Suncorp Stadium; Attendance: 8,882; Referee: Ben Williams

Round 11; 17 October 2009	Brisbane Roar (Australia)	0–3	(Australia) Central Coast Mariners	Brisbane
17:30 UTC+10		(Report) (Summary)	Travis 4'; Hutchinson 18'; Bojić 70'	Stadium: Suncorp Stadium; Attendance: 7,434; Referee: Peter Green

Round 12; 25 October 2009	Sydney FC (Australia)	2–1	(Australia) Brisbane Roar	Sydney
17:00 UTC+11	Brosque 55'; Kisel 69'	(Report) (Summary)	Cernak 73'	Stadium: Sydney Football Stadium; Attendance: 8,456; Referee: Matthew Breeze

Round 13; 30 October 2009	Brisbane Roar (Australia)	1–1	(Australia) Newcastle Jets	Brisbane
19:30 UTC+10	van Dijk 36' (pen.)	(Report) (Summary)	Haliti 32'	Stadium: Suncorp Stadium; Attendance: 7,509; Referee: Chris Beath

Round 14; 6 November 2009	Adelaide United (Australia)	0–2	(Australia) Brisbane Roar	Adelaide
19:30 UTC+10:30		Report; Summary	van Dijk 35' (pen.), 51'	Stadium: Hindmarsh Stadium; Attendance: 11,209; Referee: Craig Zetter

Round 15; 21 November 2009	Brisbane Roar (Australia)	0–1	(Australia) Melbourne Victory	Brisbane
18:00 UTC+10	Henrique (red card) 85'	Report; Summary	A. Thompson 8'	Stadium: Suncorp Stadium; Attendance: 9,904; Referee: Ben Williams

Round 16; 26 November 2009	Brisbane Roar (Australia)	4–1	(New Zealand) Wellington Phoenix	Brisbane
18:00 UTC+10	Reinaldo 17', 56' van Dijk 79'; D. Dodd 90+1'	Summary	Greenacre 27'; M. Muscat (red card) 57'	Stadium: Suncorp Stadium; Attendance: 6,307; Referee: Alan Milliner

Round 17; 6 December 2009	Perth Glory (Australia)	1–1	(Australia) Brisbane Roar	Perth
16:00 UTC+8	Harnwell 78'	Report; Summary	DeVere 52'	Stadium: ME Bank Stadium; Attendance: 7,217; Referee: Strebre Delovski

Round 18; 12 December 2009	Brisbane Roar (Australia)	0–1	(Australia) Adelaide United	Brisbane
20:00 UTC+10		Summary	Barbiero 77'	Stadium: Suncorp Stadium; Attendance: 5,801; Referee: Srebre Delovski

Round 19; 16 December 2009	Brisbane Roar (Australia)	2–0	(Australia) North Queensland Fury	Brisbane
19:30 UTC+10	van Dijk 20', 42'	Report; Summary		Stadium: Suncorp Stadium; Attendance: 11,530; Referee: Matthew Gillett

Round 20; 18 December 2009	Central Coast Mariners (Australia)	2–3	(Australia) Brisbane Roar	Gosford
18:00 UTC+11	Travis 35'; Macallister 77'	Report; Summary	Oar 10' van Dijk 22'; McKay 90+1'	Stadium: Central Coast Stadium; Attendance: 5,684; Referee: Alan Milliner

Round 21; 26 December 2009	Gold Coast United (Australia)	5–1	(Australia) Brisbane Roar	Gold Coast
17:00 UTC+10	Rees 45+1' 53'; Smeltz 50' (pen.) 61' 77'	Report; Summary	Mckay 7'	Stadium: Skilled Park; Attendance: 10,024; Referee: Srebre Delovski

Round 22; 9 January 2010	Wellington Phoenix (New Zealand)	3–1	(Australia) Brisbane Roar	Wellington
19:00 UTC+13	Brown 26'; Dadi 55' 61'	Report; Summary	van Dijk 88'	Stadium: Westpac Stadium; Attendance: 8,125; Referee: Peter O'Leary

Round 23; 16 January 2010	Brisbane Roar (Australia)	0–2	(Australia) Newcastle Jets	Brisbane
20:00 UTC+10		Report; Summary	Thompson 50'; Bridges 55' (pen.)	Stadium: Suncorp Stadium; Attendance: 6,680; Referee: Matthew Breeze

Round 24; 23 January 2010	North Queensland Fury (Australia)	1–1	(Australia) Brisbane Roar	Townsville
20:00 UTC+10	Williams 55'	Report; Summary	DeVere 48'	Stadium: Dairy Farmers Stadium; Attendance: 7,610; Referee: Gerard Parsons

Round 25; 30 January 2010	Brisbane Roar (Australia)	1–0	(Australia) Sydney FC	Brisbane
18:00 UTC+10	van Dijk 87'	Report; Summary		Stadium: Suncorp Stadium; Attendance: 8,613; Referee: Michael Hester

Round 26; 6 February 2010	Adelaide United (Australia)	2–0	(Australia) Brisbane Roar	Adelaide
19:30 UTC+10:30	Barbiero 7'; Pantelis 51'	Report; Summary		Stadium: Hindmarsh Stadium; Attendance: 8,244; Referee: Gerard Parsons

Round 27; 13 February 2010	Perth Glory (Australia)	2–0	(Australia) Brisbane Roar	Perth
16:00 UTC+8	Scott Neville 9'; Scott Bulloch 73'	Report; Summary		Stadium: ME Bank Stadium; Attendance: 8,054; Referee: Peter Green

== Goalscorers ==
Total	Player		Goals per Round																										
Total	Player		1	2	3	4	5	6	7	8	9	10	11	12	13	14	15	16	17	18	19	20	21	22	23	24	25	26	27
13	(Netherlands)	Serginho van Dijk	1	1	1					1					1	2		1			2	1		1			1		
4	(Brazil)	Reinaldo						1			1							2											
3	(Brazil)	Henrique		1				1	1																				
2	(Australia)	Matt McKay																				1	1						
2	(Australia)	Luke DeVere																	1							1			
1	(Australia)	Danny Tiatto		1																									
1	(Australia)	Craig Moore				1																							
1	(Australia)	Mitch Nichols					1																						
1	(Scotland)	Charlie Miller						1																					
1	(Australia)	Isaka Cernak												1															
1	(Australia)	David Dodd																1											
1	(Australia)	Thomas Oar																			1								

A goal was scored from a penalty kick
Two goals were scored from penalty kicks

== Squad statistics ==
No.	Pos.	Name	A-League			Finals			Total			Discipline	
No.	Pos.	Name	Apps	Goals	Assists	Apps	Goals	Assists	Apps	Goals	Assists	Yellow card	Red card
1*	GK	(Australia) Liam Reddy	10	0	0	0	0	0	10	0	0	1	0
1	GK	(Australia) Matt Ham	0(0)	0	0	0	0	0	0(0)	0	0	0	0
2	DF	(Australia) Andrew Packer	1	0	0	0	0	0	1	0	0	0	0
3	DF	(Australia) Luke DeVere	6(1)	0	0	0	0	0	6(1)	0	0	1	0
4*	DF	(Australia) Craig Moore	9	1	1	0	0	0	9	1	0	4	0
5	DF	(Australia) Josh McCloughan	5(2)	0	0	0	0	0	5(2)	0	0	1	0
6	DF	(Australia) David Dodd	4(3)	0	0	0	0	0	4(3)	0	0	5	0
7	FW	(Australia) Michael Zullo	0(2)	0	0	0	0	0	0(2)	0	0	0	0
8	MF	(Australia) Massimo Murdocca	0	0	0	0	0	0	0	0	0	0	0
9	FW	(Netherlands) Sergio van Dijk	10	4	2	0	0	0	10	4	2	0	0
10*	MF	(Scotland) Charlie Miller	7(2)	1	1	0	0	0	7(2)	1	1	3	0
11	FW	(Brazil) Reinaldo	5(2)	2	1	0	0	0	5(2)	2	1	1	0
12	DF	(Australia) Matt Mundy	4	0	0	0	0	0	0	0	0	0	0
13	MF	(Brazil) Henrique	9	3	2	0	0	0	9	3	2	3	0
14	FW	(Australia) Adam Sarota	0(2)	0	0	0	0	0	0(2)	0	0	0	0
15	MF	(Australia) Matt McKay	4	0	2	0	0	0	4	0	2	1	0
16	DF	(Scotland) Bob Malcolm	10	0	0	0	0	0	10	0	0	2	0
17	MF	(Australia) Mitch Nichols	4(3)	1	0	0	0	0	4(3)	1	0	2	0
18	MF	(Australia) Danny Tiatto	8	1	0	0	0	0	8	1	0	4	0
19	FW	(Australia) Isaka Cernak	0(5)	0	0	0	0	0	0(5)	0	0	0	0
20	GK	(Australia) Griffin McMaster	0	0	0	0	0	0	0	0	0	0	0
21	MF	(Australia) Thomas Oar	1(2)	0	0	0	0	0	1(2)	0	0	0	1
23	FW	(Australia) Tim Smits	0(2)	0	0	0	0	0	0(2)	0	0	0	0
24*	FW	(Australia) Robbie Kruse	5	0	0	0	0	0	5	0	0	2	0
27	DF	(Australia) Ivan Franjic	5	0	0	0	0	0	5	0	0	0	0
28	DF	(Australia) Calum O'Connell	1	0	0	0	0	0	1	0	0	0	0
29	MF	(Australia) Mario Karlovic	1(1)	0	0	0	0	0	1(1)	0	0	0	0
40	GK	(Australia) Vedran Janjetović	0(0)	0	0	0	0	0	0(0)	0	0	0	0

Statistics accurate as of match played 11 October 2009. Some stats not available on Roar website.

Players with a * next to their number have all been released from the club

== Ladder ==
Pos	Team	Pld	W	D	L	GF	GA	GD	Pts	Qualification
1	Sydney FC (C)	27	15	3	9	35	23	+12	48	Qualification for 2011 AFC Champions League group stage and Finals series
2	Melbourne Victory	27	14	5	8	47	32	+15	47	Qualification for 2011 AFC Champions League group stage and Finals series
3	Gold Coast United	27	13	5	9	39	35	+4	44	Qualification for Finals series
4	Wellington Phoenix	27	10	10	7	37	29	+8	40	Qualification for Finals series
5	Perth Glory	27	11	6	10	40	34	+6	39	Qualification for Finals series
6	Newcastle Jets	27	10	4	13	33	45	−12	34	Qualification for Finals series
7	North Queensland Fury	27	8	8	11	29	46	−17	32	
8	Central Coast Mariners	27	7	9	11	32	29	+3	30	
9	Brisbane Roar	27	8	6	13	32	42	−10	30	
10	Adelaide United	27	7	8	12	24	33	−9	29	

Source: ultimatealeague.com
Rules for classification: 1) points; 2) goal difference; 3) number of goals scored.
(C) Champions
