= 2006–07 Queensland Roar FC season =

Coordinates: 27°27′53″S 153°0′34″E

Queensland Roar FC
2006–07 season
- Chairman: John Ribot
- Manager: see Coaches; Miron Bleiberg; Frank Farina
- A-League: 5th
- Pre-Season Cup: 7th
- Top goalscorer: Dario Vidosic – 5 Goals
- Highest home attendance: 32,371 v Sydney FC
- Lowest home attendance: 10,040 v Newcastle Jets FC
- Average home league attendance: 16,465
- Biggest win: 5–0 v New Zealand Knights
- Biggest defeat: 4–1 v Melbourne Victory FC; 3–0 v Sydney FC & Newcastle Jets FC
Home colours	Away colours

Queensland Roar took part in the 2006–07 A-League competition, hoping to improve on their performance in the previous domestic season, which saw them finish in sixth position at the end of the A-League competition.

== Transfers ==
=== In ===
Player	Details
(Australia) Liam Reddy	from (Australia) Newcastle Jets FC
(Germany) Marcus Wedau	from (Germany) VfL Osnabrück
(Australia) Andrew Packer	from (Australia) Sydney FC
(Australia) Ante Milicic	from (Australia) Newcastle Jets FC
(Scotland) Simon Lynch	from (Scotland) Dundee
(Australia) Sasa Ognenovski	from (Australia) Fawkner-Whittlesea Blues
(Australia) Dario Vidosic	from (Australia) Queensland Lions
(Australia) Steve Fitzsimmons	from New Zealand Knights
(Australia) Robbie Kruse	from (Australia) Queensland Academy of Sport
(Australia) Damian Mori	from (Australia) Central Coast Mariners
(Australia) Chris Grossman	from (Australia) Queensland Academy of Sport

=== Out ===
Player	Details
(Australia) Alex Brosque	to (Australia) Sydney FC
(Australia) Jonti Richter	to New Zealand Knights
(Australia) Scott Higgins	to (Scotland) Falkirk
(Australia) Todd Gava	Released
(Australia) Michael Baird	to (Romania) FC Universitatea Craiova
(Australia) Royce Brownlie	to (England) Swindon Town
(Australia) Tyler Simpson	to (Australia) Perth Glory
(Australia) Reece Tollenaere	Released
(Australia) Warren Moon	to (Scotland) Queen of the South
(Australia) David Williams	to (Denmark) Brøndby
(Australia) Tim Smits	to New Zealand Knights

== Squad ==
Note: Flags indicate national team as defined under FIFA eligibility rules; some limited exceptions apply. Players may hold more than one non-FIFA nationality.

No.	Pos.	Nation	Player
1	GK	AUS	Tom Willis
2	MF	AUS	Andrew Packer
3	DF	SUI	Remo Buess
4	DF	AUS	Chad Gibson (captain)
5	DF	AUS	Josh McCloughlan
6	DF	SCO	Stuart McLaren
7	MF	GER	Marcus Wedau
8	MF	AUS	Massimo Murdocca
9	FW	SCO	Simon Lynch
10	FW	BRA	Reinaldo Elias da Costa
11	FW	AUS	Ante Milicic

No.	Pos.	Nation	Player
12	FW	CHN	Zhang Yuning
13	MF	AUS	Spase Dilevski
14	DF	AUS	Ben Griffin
15	MF	AUS	Matt McKay
16	MF	KOR	Hyuk-Su Seo
17	FW	AUS	Damian Mori
18	MF	AUS	Dario Vidosic
19	DF	AUS	Sasa Ognenovski
20	GK	AUS	Liam Reddy
21	MF	AUS	Steve Fitzsimmons
27	MF	AUS	Chris Grossman

=== Injuries & replacements ===
- Round 8 to Season Massimo Murdocca (foot)
- Round 14 to Round 18 Marcus Wedau (grade one hamstring tear) replaced by Chris Grossman

=== Suspensions ===
- Round 15 Chad Gibson (red card)

=== Coaches ===
Coach Miron Bleiberg resigned after the Round 12 loss to Adelaide United. Frank Farina became coach on 16 November 2006.

== Pre-Season cup ==
=== Summary ===
Round	Date	Home team	Score	Away team	Crowd
1	15 July 2006	Queensland Roar	1–2	Sydney FC	7,132
2	22 July 2006	Queensland Roar	1–1	New Zealand Knights	3,347
3	29 July 2006	Newcastle Jets FC	0–0	Queensland Roar	2,822
4	6 August 2006	Queensland Roar	0–0	Central Coast	4,571
Playoff	11 August 2006	Melbourne Victory FC (PEN)	(4) 1–1 (2)	Queensland Roar	2,117
Final	18 August 2006	New Zealand Knights	1–2	Queensland Roar	Unknown

=== Group stage ===
Pos	Team	Pld	W	D	L	GF	GA	BP	Pts	Qualification
1	Sydney FC	4	3	1	0	7	2	2	12	Advance to semi-finals
2	Newcastle Jets FC	4	0	2	2	4	6	1	3	Advance to semi-finals
3	New Zealand Knights	4	0	3	1	2	3	0	3	
4	Queensland Roar	4	0	3	1	2	3	0	3	

Head-to-head results: Queensland Roar 1–1 New Zealand Knights (tied on head-to-head results, ranked on disciplinary record).
15 July 2006
18:00 AEST

Queensland Roar	1–2	Sydney FC
Smits 31'		Petrovski 16'; Brosque 87'

Carrara Stadium, Gold Coast
Attendance: 7,132
Referee: Peter Green
22 July 2006
18:00 AEST

Queensland Roar	1–1	New Zealand Knights
Dilevski 8'		Rodrigues 24'

Maroochydore Soccer Club, Maroochydore
Attendance: 3,347
Referee: Matthew Breeze
29 July 2006
18:30 AEST

Newcastle Jets FC	0–0	Queensland Roar

Port Macquarie Regional Stadium, Port Macquarie
Attendance: 2,822
Referee: James Lewis

=== Playoffs ===
11 August 2006
19:30 AEST

Melbourne Victory FC	0–0 (a.e.t.)	Queensland Roar
Penalties
Muscat (penalty scored); Vargas (penalty scored); Thompson (penalty scored); Sarkies (penalty scored)	4–2	(penalty scored) Lynch; (penalty missed) Fitzsimmons; (penalty scored) Ognenovski; (penalty missed) Gibson

Seventh place playoff

18 August 2006
17:30 NZDT

New Zealand Knights	1–2	Queensland Roar
Bazeley 65'		Reinaldo 49'; Vidošić

North Harbour Stadium, Auckland
Referee: Peter O'Leary (New Zealand)

== 2006–07 A-League Season ==
=== Summary ===
Round	Date	Result	Home team	Score	Away team	Venue	Crowd	Ladder
1	26 August 2006	Win	Queensland Roar	3–0	Perth Glory	Suncorp Stadium (N)	20,606	1st
2	1 September 2006	Win	Newcastle Jets FC	2–3	Queensland Roar	EnergyAustralia Stadium (N)	7,276	1st
3	9 September 2006	Draw	Central Coast Mariners	0–0	Queensland Roar	Central Coast Stadium (N)	4,644	2nd
4	15 September 2006	Win	Queensland Roar	5–0	New Zealand Knights	Suncorp Stadium (N)	15,517	2nd
5	22 September 2006	Draw	Queensland Roar	1–1	Adelaide United	Suncorp Stadium (N)	16,143	2nd
6	1 October 2006	Loss	Melbourne Victory FC	4–1	Queensland Roar	Telstra Dome (T)	25,921	2nd
7	8 October 2006	Draw	Sydney FC	1–1	Queensland Roar	Sydney Football Stadium	17,274	2nd
8	15 October 2006	Win	Perth Glory	1–2	Queensland Roar	Members Equity Stadium (T)	9,978	2nd
9	22 October 2006	Loss	Queensland Roar	0–1	Newcastle Jets FC	Suncorp Stadium (T)	16,061	3rd
10	28 October 2006	Draw	Queensland Roar	1–1	Central Coast Mariners	Suncorp Stadium (N)	13,727	2nd
11	5 November 2006	Loss	New Zealand Knights	1–0	Queensland Roar	North Harbour Stadium	2,600	3rd
12	11 November 2006	Loss	Queensland Roar	0–1	Adelaide United	Suncorp Stadium (N)	14,154	4th
13	17 November 2006	Loss	Queensland Roar	0–2	Melbourne Victory FC	Suncorp Stadium (N)	14,797	4th
14	24 November 2006	Loss	Sydney FC	3–0	Queensland Roar	Sydney Football Stadium (N)	12,718	7th
15	2 December 2006	Win	Queensland Roar	1–0	Perth Glory	Suncorp Stadium (N)	11,237	6th
16	7 December 2006	Loss	Queensland Roar	0–3	Newcastle Jets FC	Suncorp Stadium (N)	10,040	6th
17	16 December 2006	Win	Central Coast Mariners	2–3	Queensland Roar	Central Coast Stadium (N)	7,132	6th
18	29 December 2006	Loss	New Zealand Knights	3–1	Queensland Roar	North Harbour Stadium (N)	1,963	6th
19	4 January 2007	Win	Adelaide United	0–1	Queensland Roar	Hindmarsh Stadium (N)	10,435	5th
20	12 January 2006	Win	Melbourne Victory FC	1–2	Queensland Roar	Telstra Dome (N)	28,937	4th
21	20 January 2006	Draw	Queensland Roar	1–1	Sydney FC	Suncorp Stadium (N)	32,371	5th

KEY (N) = Night game (T) = Twilight game

=== Table ===
Pos	Team	Pld	W	D	L	GF	GA	GD	Pts	Qualification
1	Melbourne Victory (C)	21	14	3	4	41	20	+21	45	Qualification for 2008 AFC Champions League group stage and Finals series
2	Adelaide United	21	10	3	8	32	27	+5	33	Qualification for 2008 AFC Champions League group stage and Finals series
3	Newcastle Jets	21	8	6	7	32	30	+2	30	Qualification for Finals series
4	Sydney FC	21	8	8	5	29	19	+10	29 (Note: Sydney FC were penalised three competition points following round 18 due to salary cap breaches which occurred during the 2005–06 season)	Qualification for Finals series
5	Queensland Roar	21	8	5	8	25	27	−2	29	
6	Central Coast Mariners	21	6	6	9	22	26	−4	24	
7	Perth Glory	21	5	5	11	24	30	−6	20	
8	New Zealand Knights (Note: New Zealand Knights cannot qualify for the AFC Champions League as they are not recognised as an AFC club.)	21	5	4	12	13	39	−26	19	Disbanded at end of season

Source: ultimatealeague.com
Rules for classification: 1) points; 2) goal difference; 3) number of goals scored.
(C) Champions

=== Goal scorers ===
5 Goals
Dario Vidosic
4 Goals
Ante Milicic
Reinaldo
3 Goals
Simon Lynch
Matt McKay
2 Goals
Damian Mori
1 Goal
Stuart McLaren
Spase Dilevski
Ben Griffin
Own Goals
Chad Gibson
Josh McCloughlan
Sasa Ognenovski
Andrew Packer

=== Clean sheets ===
Liam Reddy – 6
