= 2008–09 Queensland Roar FC season =

Coordinates: 27°27′53″S 153°0′34″E

Queensland Roar FC
2008–09 season
- Chairman: N/A
- Manager: Frank Farina
- A-League: 3rd
- Pre-Season Cup: 8th
- Top goalscorer: League: Serginho van Dijk – 11 Goals; All: Serginho van Dijk – 12 Goals
- Highest home attendance: 23,705 v Central Coast Mariners
- Lowest home attendance: 9,118 v Perth Glory
- Average home league attendance: 13,968
Home colours	Away colours

The 2008–09 Queensland Roar season was the club's fourth season participating in the A-League where they would finish in 3rd place in the regular season.

== Squad ==
Full time squad as of 31 July 2008

Note: Flags indicate national team as defined under FIFA eligibility rules; some limited exceptions apply. Players may hold more than one non-FIFA nationality.

No.	Pos.	Nation	Player
1	GK	AUS	Liam Reddy
2	MF	AUS	Andrew Packer
3	DF	AUS	Luke de Vere
4	DF	AUS	Craig Moore (c)
5	DF	AUS	Josh McCloughan
6	MF	AUS	David Dodd
7	MF	AUS	Michael Zullo
8	MF	AUS	Massimo Murdocca
9	FW	IDN	Sergio van Dijk
10	MF	SCO	Charlie Miller
11	FW	BRA	Reinaldo
12	FW	AUS	Tahj Minniecon

No.	Pos.	Nation	Player
13	MF	AUS	Chris Grossman
14	DF	AUS	Ben Griffin
15	MF	AUS	Matt McKay
16	DF	KOR	Seo Hyuk-Su
17	MF	AUS	Mitch Nichols
18	MF	AUS	Danny Tiatto
19	MF	AUS	Isaka Cernak-Okanya
20	GK	AUS	Griffin McMaster
21	MF	AUS	Thomas Oar
22	FW	AUS	Robbie Kruse
23	FW	AUS	Tim Smits

=== Player movement ===
Note: Flags indicate national team as defined under FIFA eligibility rules; some limited exceptions apply. Players may hold more than one non-FIFA nationality.

No.	Pos.	Nation	Player
3	DF	AUS	Luke DeVere (Moved from AIS)
6	MF	AUS	David Dodd (Moved from Palm Beach)
9	FW	IDN	Sergio van Dijk (Moved from FC Emmen)
10	MF	SCO	Charlie Miller (Moved from Lierse S.K.)
11	FW	BRA	Reinaldo¤ (Moved from Busan I'Park)
19	MF	AUS	Isaka Cernak (Moved from AIS)
21	MF	AUS	Tommy Oar (Moved from QAS)
23	FW	AUS	Tim Smits (Moved from Rochedale Rovers)
33	MF	BRA	Henrique (Loaned from América Mineiro)

No.	Pos.	Nation	Player
6	DF	AUS	Stuart McLaren (Moved to Perth Glory)
9	FW	SCO	Simon Lynch (Moved to Airdrie United)
10	FW	AUS	Ante Miličić (Moved to Shahzan Muda FC)
11	FW	BRA	Reinaldo¤ (Moved to Busan I'Park)
13	FW	AUS	Zoran Petrevski (Moved to Melbourne Knights)
19	DF	AUS	Sasa Ognenovski (Moved to Adelaide United)
20	GK	AUS	Matthew Ham (Moved to Redlands United)
23	MF	BRA	Marcinho (Released)

¤ Reinaldo transferred to Busan I'Park at the end of the 2007/08 A-League season and returned to Queensland in July 2008 on a free transfer.

== Pre-season ==
=== Roar Roadshow ===
14 May 2008
19:15 UTC+10

Brisbane Olympic	0–6	Queensland Roar
	(Report)	Smits 23', 35'; Packer 49'; Grossman 57', 70', 80'

Goodwin Park
Yeronga, Queensland

20 May 2008
19:15 UTC+10

Rochedale Rovers	2–5	Queensland Roar
Tabulo; Unknown	(Report)	Nichols; Smits; Close; Thurtell

Underwood Park
Rochedale, Queensland

27 May 2008
19:15 UTC+10

Redlands United	0–4	Queensland Roar
	(Report)	van Dijk; Grossman; Kruse

Cleveland Showgrounds
Cleveland, Queensland

29 May 2008
19:15 UTC+10

Gold Coast Representative XI	0–2	Queensland Roar
	(Report)	van Dijk; Murdocca

Pizzey Park
Miami, Queensland

5 June 2008
19:15 UTC+10

Brisbane Strikers	1–2	Queensland Roar
Hews	(Report)	Kruse; Oar

Luxury Paints Stadium
Richlands, Queensland

8 June 2008
14:00 UTC+10

Sunshine Coast F.C.	1–0	Queensland Roar
Muta 47'	(Report)

One Mile Ovals
Gympie, Queensland

17 June 2008
19:15 UTC+10

Peninsula Power	0–1	Queensland Roar
	(Report)	Oar 44'

A.J. Kelly Field
Kippa-Ring, Queensland

24 June 2008
19:15 UTC+10

Brisbane City	0–4	Queensland Roar
	(Report)	Smits 53'; McKay 58'; Minniecon 60'; Nichols 65'

Spencer Park
Newmarket, Queensland

1 July 2008
19:15 UTC+10

Easts Invitational XI	1–8	Queensland Roar
Baty 14' (pen.)	(Report)	Packer 3'; Smits 24' 29' 90' van Dijk; McKay 69'; Oar 70'; Carroll (g.k.) 74' (o.g.)

Heath Park
East Brisbane, Queensland

=== Translink Cup ===
12 July 2008
19:00 UTC+10

Queensland Roar	3–1	(Brazil) Palmeiras B
Smits 35'; McKay 43'; Murdocca 90+2'	(Report)	Portela 57'

Suncorp Stadium
Brisbane, Queensland
Attendance: 13,000
Referee: Peter Green

=== 2008 A-League Pre-Season Challenge Cup ===
19 July 2008
19:00 UTC+10

Sydney FC	2–1	Queensland Roar
Payne 53'; Prentice 57'	(Report)	van Dijk 49'

Campbelltown Stadium,
Campbelltown, New South Wales
Attendance: 4,222
Referee: Matthew Breeze

27 July 2008
14:30 UTC+10

Queensland Roar	1–1	Wellington Phoenix
van Dijk 18'	(Report)	Kwasnik 74'

Stockland Park
Sunshine Coast, Queensland
Attendance: 3,832
Referee: Regis Queffelec

3 August 2008
15:00 UTC+10

Queensland Roar	1–2	Central Coast Mariners
Zullo 51'	(Report)	Elrich 29'; Macallister 32'

Perry Park
Bowen Hills, Queensland
Attendance: 3,241
Referee: Peter Green

== Hyundai A-League 2008–09 ==
Round 1

17 August 2008
15:00 UTC+12

Wellington Phoenix	1–1	Queensland Roar
Smeltz 53'	(Report) (Summary)	Miller 46'

Westpac Stadium
Wellington, New Zealand
Attendance: 10,516
Referee: Ben Williams

Round 2

24 August 2008
17:00 UTC+10

Queensland Roar	1–1	Adelaide United
Miller 47'	(Report) (Summary)	Dodd 8' (pen.)

Suncorp Stadium
Brisbane, Queensland
Attendance: 12,761
Referee: Mark Shield

Round 3

31 August 2008
17:00 UTC+10

Queensland Roar	2–4	Central Coast Mariners
Miller 69' van Dijk 74' (pen.)	(Report) (Summary)	Simon 31'; Jedinak 48'; Macallister 64' 71'

Suncorp Stadium
Brisbane, Queensland
Attendance: 12,185
Referee: Peter O’Leary

Round 4

14 September 2008
15:00 UTC+8

Perth Glory	0–3	Queensland Roar
	(Report) (Summary)	Moore 14'; McKay 23'; Miller 45+2'

Members Equity Stadium
Perth, Western Australia
Attendance: 8,203
Referee: Ben Williams

Round 5

19 September 2008
20:00 UTC+10

Queensland Roar	0–1	Newcastle Jets
	(Report) (Summary)	Griffiths 83'

Suncorp Stadium
Brisbane, Queensland
Attendance: 12,103
Referee: Craig Zetter

Round 6

28 September 2008
17:00 UTC+10

Melbourne Victory	0–2	Queensland Roar
	(Report) (Summary)	Minniecon 83'; Zullo 90+5'

Telstra Dome
Melbourne
Attendance: 22,226
Referee: Ben Williams

Round 7

4 October 2008
19:00 UTC+10

Sydney FC	1–1	Queensland Roar
Musialik 90+3'	(Report) (Summary)	Miller 48'

Sydney Football Stadium
Sydney
Attendance: 12,403
Referee: Matthew Breeze

Round 8

17 October 2008
19:30 UTC+10

Queensland Roar	0–1	Adelaide United
	(Report) (Summary)	Cornthwaite 60'

Suncorp Stadium
Brisbane, Queensland
Attendance: 11,117
Referee: Mark Shield

Round 9

26 October 2008
17:00 UTC+13

Wellington Phoenix	0–1	Queensland Roar
	(Report) (Summary)	McCloughan 40'

Westpac Stadium
Wellington, New Zealand
Attendance: 6,543
Referee: Peter O'Leary

Round 10

2 November 2008
17:00 UTC+11

Newcastle Jets	1–2	Queensland Roar
Griffiths 23'	(Report) (Summary)	McKay 24'; Miller 35'

Energy Australia Stadium
Newcastle, New South Wales
Attendance: 10,507
Referee: Craig Zetter

Round 11

8 November 2008
19:00 UTC+10

Queensland Roar	0–1	Melbourne Victory
	(Report) (Summary)	Thompson 70'

Suncorp Stadium
Brisbane, Queensland
Attendance: 12,022
Referee: Peter O’Leary

Round 12

23 November 2008
17:00 UTC+10

Queensland Roar	4–1	Perth Glory
van Dijk 45+1' (pen.); Minniecon 45+3'; Miller 55'; Nichols 81'	(Report) (Summary)	Harnwell 57'

Suncorp Stadium
Brisbane, Queensland
Attendance: 9,118
Referee: Peter Green

Round 13

28 November 2008
20:00 UTC+11

Sydney FC	1–1	Queensland Roar
Corica 64'	(Report) (Summary)	McKay 12'

Sydney Football Stadium
Sydney
Attendance: 8,502
Referee: Matthew Breeze

Round 14

6 December 2008
18:00 UTC+11

Central Coast Mariners	1–1	Queensland Roar
Gumprecht 83'	(Report) (Summary)	van Dijk 11'

Bluetongue Stadium
Gosford, New South Wales
Attendance: 8,995
Referee: Ben Williams

Round 15

14 December 2008
18:00 UTC+10

Queensland Roar	2–1	Newcastle Jets
Nichols 45+1' van Dijk 90'	(Report) (Summary)	Griffiths 26'

Suncorp Stadium
Brisbane, Queensland
Attendance: 11,048
Referee: Ben Williams

Round 16

14 January 2009
19:30 UTC+10:30

Adelaide United	0–0	Queensland Roar
	(Report) (Summary)

Hindmarsh Stadium
Adelaide, South Australia
Attendance: 14,450
Referee: Strebre Delovski

Round 17

28 December 2008
18:00 UTC+10

Queensland Roar	3–2	Wellington Phoenix
McKay 38' van Dijk 48'; Oar 90+1'	(Report) (Summary)	de Vere 11' (o.g.); Hearfield 46'

Suncorp Stadium
Brisbane, Queensland
Attendance: 13,115
Referee: Ben Williams

Round 18

2 January 2009
20:00 UTC+11

Melbourne Victory	2–1	Queensland Roar
Allsopp 55'; Vargas 67'	(Report) (Summary)	Moore 75'

Telstra Dome
Melbourne
Attendance: 23,447
Referee: Peter O’Leary

Round 19

10 January 2009
19:00 UTC+11

Central Coast Mariners	3–4	Queensland Roar
Mrdja 5'; Simon 55' 81'	(Report) (Summary)	van Dijk 43' 48'; Minniecon 60'; Bojic 69' (o.g.)

Bluetongue Stadium
Gosford, New South Wales
Attendance: 11,454
Referee: Matthew Breeze

Round 20

17 January 2009
19:00 UTC+10

Queensland Roar	3–1	Sydney FC
van Dijk 15' 28' 90+3'	(Report) (Summary)	Danning 25'

Suncorp Stadium
Brisbane, Queensland
Attendance: 19,111
Referee: Craig Zetter

Round 21

24 January 2009
19:00 UTC+10

Queensland Roar	4–2	Perth Glory
Nichols 27'; Tiatto 63' van Dijk 76'; McCloughan 82'	(Report) (Summary)	Rukavytsya 21'; Skorich 66'

Suncorp Stadium
Brisbane, Queensland
Attendance: 17,367
Referee: Peter O'Leary

=== Finals series ===
Minor semi-final – away leg

6 February 2009
20:00 UTC+11

Central Coast Mariners	0–2	Queensland Roar
	(Report) (Summary)	Nichols 30' van Dijk 54' (pen.)

Bluetongue Stadium
Gosford, New South Wales
Attendance: 9,514
Referee: Ben Williams

Minor semi-final – home leg

13 February 2009
19:30 UTC+10

Queensland Roar	2–1	Central Coast Mariners
Nichols 21'; McKay 49'	(Report) (Summary)	Mrdja 64'

Suncorp Stadium
Brisbane, Queensland
Attendance: 24,705
Referee: Peter Green

Preliminary final (One Leg – Played away to loser of major semi-final)

21 February 2009
19:00 UTC+10

Adelaide United	1–0	Queensland Roar
Barbiero 25'	(Report) (Summary)

Hindmarsh Stadium
Adelaide, South Australia
Attendance: 8,472
Referee: Strebre Delovski

== Ladder position ==
Pos	Team	Pld	W	D	L	GF	GA	GD	Pts	Qualification
1	Melbourne Victory (C)	21	12	2	7	39	27	+12	38	Qualification for 2010 AFC Champions League group stage and Finals series
2	Adelaide United	21	11	5	5	31	19	+12	38	Qualification for 2010 AFC Champions League group stage and Finals series
3	Queensland Roar	21	10	6	5	36	25	+11	36	Qualification for Finals series
4	Central Coast Mariners	21	7	7	7	35	32	+3	28	Qualification for Finals series
5	Sydney FC	21	7	5	9	33	32	+1	26	
6	Wellington Phoenix	21	7	5	9	23	31	−8	26	
7	Perth Glory	21	6	4	11	31	44	−13	22	
8	Newcastle Jets	21	4	6	11	21	39	−18	18	

Source: ultimatealeague.com
Rules for classification: 1) points; 2) goal difference; 3) number of goals scored.
(C) Champions
