= 2006 A-League Pre-season Challenge Cup =

Tournament details
- Country: Australia; New Zealand
- Dates: 15 July – 19 August 2006
- Teams: 8

Final positions
- Champions: Adelaide United (1st title)
- Runners-up: Central Coast Mariners
- Third place: Sydney FC
- Fourth place: Newcastle Jets FC

Tournament statistics
- Matches played: 24
- Goals scored: 44 (1.83 per match)
- Attendance: 112,254 (4,677 per match)

The 2006 A-League Pre-season Challenge Cup was a series in the Australian A-League football competition held in July and August in the lead up to the start of the main season. The opening round was 15 July 2006. The competition featured a group stage, with three regular rounds and a bonus round, followed by a two-week finals playoff. The bonus group round matched up teams against opponents from the other group, and also offered the incentive of "bonus points" based on goals scored (1 point for 2 goals, 2 points for 3 goals, 3 points for 4 or more goals).

The Pre-season Cup was used to enhance the A-League's profiles by playing pre-season games in regional centres including the Gold Coast, Sunshine Coast, Toowoomba, Launceston, Canberra, Wollongong, Port Macquarie, Orange and Tamworth.

== Group stage ==
=== Group A ===
Pos	Team	Pld	W	D	L	GF	GA	BP	Pts	Qualification
1	Central Coast Mariners	4	2	2	0	5	2	0	8	Advance to semi-finals
2	Adelaide United	4	2	2	0	2	0	0	8	Advance to semi-finals
3	Melbourne Victory FC	4	1	1	2	5	7	2	6	
4	Perth Glory	4	0	2	2	3	6	0	2	

15 July 2006
18:00 AEST

Central Coast Mariners	2–1	Perth Glory
Petrie 7'; Kwasnik 8'		Bertos 62'

Central Coast Stadium, Gosford
Attendance: 5,860
Referee: James Lewis
16 July 2006
13:00 AEST

Melbourne Victory FC	0–1	Adelaide United
		Veart 65'

Aurora Stadium, Launceston
Attendance: 6,834
Referee: Matthew Breeze
22 July 2006
15:00 AEST

Central Coast Mariners	0–0	Adelaide United

Wade Park, Orange
Attendance: 4,344
Referee: Simon Przydacz
22 July 2006
22:00 AWST

Perth Glory	1–1	Melbourne Victory FC
Young 59'		Allsopp 51'

Dorrien Gardens, Perth
Attendance: 2,000
Referee: Angelo Nardi
29 July 2006
15:00 AEST

Melbourne Victory FC	1–3	Central Coast Mariners
Thompson 4'		Kwasnik 35'; O'Grady 63'; Spencer 77'

Olympic Park, Melbourne
Attendance: 6,593
Referee: Craig Zetter
30 July 2006
18:00 AWST

Perth Glory	0–0	Adelaide United

Dorrien Gardens, Perth
Attendance: 3,038
Referee: Angelo Nardi

=== Group B ===
Pos	Team	Pld	W	D	L	GF	GA	BP	Pts	Qualification
1	Sydney FC	4	3	1	0	7	2	2	12	Advance to semi-finals
2	Newcastle Jets FC	4	0	2	2	4	6	1	3	Advance to semi-finals
3	New Zealand Knights	4	0	3	1	2	3	0	3	
4	Queensland Roar	4	0	3	1	2	3	0	3	

Head-to-head results: Queensland Roar 1–1 New Zealand Knights (tied on head-to-head results, ranked on disciplinary record).
15 July 2006
18:00 AEST

Queensland Roar	1–2	Sydney FC
Smits 31'		Petrovski 16'; Brosque 87'

Carrara Stadium, Gold Coast
Attendance: 7,132
Referee: Peter Green
16 July 2006
16:00 NZDT

New Zealand Knights	1–1	Newcastle Jets FC
Richter 39'		Bridge 57'

North Harbour Stadium, Auckland
Attendance: 804
Referee: Neil Fox
22 July 2006
14:00 AEST

Sydney FC	2–1	Newcastle Jets FC
Topor-Stanley 2'; Middleby 25'		McFlynn 68' (o.g.)

Canberra Stadium, Canberra
Attendance: 7,226
Referee: Ben Williams
22 July 2006
18:00 AEST

Queensland Roar	1–1	New Zealand Knights
Dilevski 8'		Rodrigues 24'

Maroochydore Soccer Club, Maroochydore
Attendance: 3,347
Referee: Matthew Breeze
29 July 2006
12:00 NZDT

New Zealand Knights	0–0	Sydney FC

North Harbour Stadium
Attendance: 3,121
Referee: Peter O'Leary
29 July 2006
18:30 AEST

Newcastle Jets FC	0–0	Queensland Roar

Port Macquarie Regional Stadium, Port Macquarie
Attendance: 2,822
Referee: James Lewis

=== Bonus round ===
4 August 2006

Adelaide United	1–0	New Zealand Knights
Veart 19' (pen.)	Report

Hindmarsh Stadium, Adelaide
Attendance: 12,006
Referee: Craig Zetter
5 August 2006

Newcastle Jets FC	2–3	Melbourne Victory FC
North 17'; Carle 65' (pen.)	Report	Thompson 4'; Muscat 62' (pen.); Allsopp 84'

Scully Park, Tamworth
Attendance: 3,126
Referee: Matthew Breeze
6 August 2006

Queensland Roar	0–0	Central Coast Mariners
	Report

Clive Berghofer Stadium, Toowoomba
Attendance: 4,571
Referee: Peter Green
6 August 2006

Sydney FC	3–0	Perth Glory
Brosque 26', 27'; Petrovski 57'	Report

WIN Stadium, Wollongong
Attendance: 6,634
Referee: Strebre Delovski

== Knockout stage ==
=== Bracket ===
Playoffs
A1	Central Coast Mariners	2
B2	Newcastle Jets FC	1
A2	Adelaide United	2
B1	Sydney FC	1
A3	Melbourne Victory FC (pen.)	0 (4)
B4	Queensland Roar	0 (2)
A4	New Zealand Knights	0
B3	Perth Glory	1

Finals
Grand final
Central Coast Mariners	1 (4)
Adelaide United (pen.)	1 (5)
Third place
Sydney FC	2
Newcastle Jets FC	0
Fifth place
Melbourne Victory FC	1
Perth Glory	0
Seventh place
New Zealand Knights	1
Queensland Roar	2

=== Playoffs ===
11 August 2006
17:30 NZDT

New Zealand Knights	0–1	Perth Glory
		Young 87'

North Harbour Stadium, Auckland
Attendance: 1,104
Referee: Peter O'Leary (New Zealand)
11 August 2006
19:30 AEST

Sydney FC	1–2	Adelaide United
Carney 43'		Dodd 16'; Rees 90'

WIN Stadium
Attendance: 4,210
Referee: Mark Shield (Australia)
11 August 2006
19:30 AEST

Melbourne Victory FC	0–0 (a.e.t.)	Queensland Roar
Penalties
Muscat (penalty scored); Vargas (penalty scored); Thompson (penalty scored); Sarkies (penalty scored)	4–2	(penalty scored) Lynch; (penalty missed) Fitzsimmons; (penalty scored) Ognenovski; (penalty missed) Gibson

12 August 2006
18:00 AEST

Central Coast Mariners	2–1 (a.e.t.)	Newcastle Jets FC
Petrie 52' (pen.); O'Grady 96'		Coveny 25'

Central Coast Stadium, Gosford
Attendance: 7,567
Referee: Ben Williams (Australia)

=== Seventh place play-off ===
18 August 2006
17:30 NZDT

New Zealand Knights	1–2	Queensland Roar
Bazeley 65'		Reinaldo 49'; Vidošić 88'

North Harbour Stadium, Auckland
Referee: Peter O'Leary (New Zealand)

=== Fifth place play-off ===
18 August 2006
19:30 AEST

Melbourne Victory FC	1–0	Perth Glory
Allsopp 84'

Olympic Park Stadium, Melbourne
Attendance: 2,215
Referee: Ben Williams (Australia)

=== Third place play-off ===
19 August 2006
19:30 AEST

Sydney FC	2–0	Newcastle Jets FC
Petrovski 40'; Rudan 68'

Campbelltown Stadium, Campbelltown
Attendance: 5,326
Referee: Strebe Delovski (Australia)

=== Final ===
19 August 2006
18:00 AEST

Central Coast Mariners	1–1 (a.e.t.)	Adelaide United
Gumprecht 77'		Veart 7'
Penalties
McMaster (penalty scored); Petrie (penalty missed); O'Sullivan (penalty scored); Spencer (penalty scored); Hutchinson (penalty scored)	4–5	(penalty scored) Alagich; (penalty scored) Owens; (penalty scored) Aloisi; (penalty scored) Qu; (penalty scored) Veart

Central Coast Stadium, Gosford
Attendance: 10,463
Referee: Simon Przydacz (Australia)

== Attendances ==
Round	Games	Average	Highest	Lowest	Total
Pre-Season Group Stage	16	4,954	12,006	804	79,252
Pre-Season Finals	7	4,715	10,463	1,104	33,002
Totals	23	4,881	12,006	804	112,254

== Top goalscorers ==
3 goals:

- (Australia) Carl Veart (Adelaide United)
- (Australia) Danny Allsopp (Melbourne Victory FC)
- (Australia) Alex Brosque (Sydney FC)
- (Australia) Sasho Petrovski (Sydney FC)

2 goals:

- (Australia) Adam Kwasnik (Central Coast Mariners)
- (Australia) Paul O'Grady (Central Coast Mariners)
- (Scotland) Stewart Petrie (Central Coast Mariners)
- (Australia) Archie Thompson (Melbourne Victory FC)
- (England) Stuart Young (Perth Glory)

1 goal:

- (Australia) Travis Dodd (Adelaide United)
- (Australia) Kristian Rees (Adelaide United)
- (Germany) Andre Gumprecht (Central Coast Mariners)
- (Australia) Noel Spencer (Central Coast Mariners)
- (Australia) Kevin Muscat (Melbourne Victory FC)
- (England) Darren Bazeley (New Zealand Knights)
- (Australia) Jonti Richter (New Zealand Knights)
- (Portugal) Dani Rodrigues (New Zealand Knights)
- (Australia) Mark Bridge (Newcastle Jets FC
- (Australia) Nicky Carle (Newcastle Jets FC)
- (New Zealand) Vaughan Coveny (Newcastle Jets FC)
- (Australia) Jade North (Newcastle Jets FC)
- (New Zealand) Leo Bertos (Perth Glory)
- (Australia) Spase Dilevski (Queensland Roar)
- (Brazil) Reinaldo (Queensland Roar)
- (Australia) Tim Smits (Queensland Roar)
- (Australia) Dario Vidosic (Queensland Roar)
- (Australia) David Carney (Sydney FC)
- (Australia) Robbie Middleby (Sydney FC)
- (Australia) Mark Rudan (Sydney FC)
- (Australia) Nikolai Topor-Stanley (Sydney FC)
