= List of Adelaide United FC international footballers =

Adelaide United Football Club is an Australian professional association football club based in Adelaide, South Australia. Founded in 2003, the team originally played in the National Soccer League until it entered the newly-formed A-League in 2005–06. Nicknamed "the Reds", due to the dominant colour of the home shirts, Adelaide was one of the eight founding members of the A-League.

Adelaide have been Champions of Australia once, in 2015–16, has won the A-League Premiership twice, in 2005–06 and 2015–16 and the FFA Cup three times, in 2014, 2018 and 2019. The Reds also won the A-League Pre-Season Challenge Cup in 2006 and 2007, and reached the 2008 AFC Champions League Final.

Adelaide has held home fixtures at Hindmarsh Stadium from the club's beginnings in 2003. Adelaide Oval is occasionally used as a home ground for significant fixtures. Adelaide has a longstanding rivalry with Melbourne Victory, with whom it contests "The Original Rivalry".

The following list contains all footballers who have represented their country at full international level whilst being an Adelaide player.

== Introduction ==
Adelaide United's first internationals were Travis Dodd and Michael Valkanis, who appeared for Australia on 16 August 2006, in a 2–1 victory over Kuwait. Dodd scored on debut, which was the first international goal scored by an Adelaide United player. Australian goalkeeper Craig Goodwin is Adelaide's most capped player, appearing in thirteen games for his country between 2016 and 2023.

All Adelaide United players to receive international caps have been Australians. Adelaide have had two players who have been selected for his country in major international tournaments whilst at the club.

=== FIFA World Cup ===
The first Adelaide player to be selected for the FIFA World Cup was Eugene Galekovic, who was selected for Australia in the 2010 tournament. Galekovic would also be selected for the 2014 edition. He did not make an appearance on either occasion. Craig Goodwin appeared for Australia at the 2022 tournament in which he played in all four of Australia's matches and also scored in a match against France.

=== Continental tournaments ===
Eugene Galekovic was selected in the Australia side for the 2015 AFC Asian Cup. He did not make an appearance in the tournament.

== Key ==
- The following list contains only players who gained international caps whilst a registered player of Adelaide United. Caps gained prior to joining and subsequent to leaving the club are not included.
- Table headings: Apps = Total number of appearances for the national side while an Adelaide player; Goals = Total number of goals for the national side while an Adelaide player; Years = Dates of international caps as an Adelaide player; Ref = source of information
- Playing positions: GK = Goalkeeper; DF = Defender; MF = Midfielder; FW = Forward
- † Players with this colour and symbol in the "Name" column are currently signed to Adelaide.

== List of players ==
As of November 2025

List of Adelaide United FC players making full international appearances
| Name | Nation | Position | Intl. Years | Caps | Goals | Notes |
|---|---|---|---|---|---|---|
| Fabian Barbiero | Australia | MF | 2009 | 1 | 0 | |
| Nathan Burns | Australia | FW | 2007–2008 | 2 | 0 | |
| Robert Cornthwaite | Australia | DF | 2009 | 1 | 0 | |
| Bruce Djite | Australia | FW | 2008 | 1 | 0 | |
| Travis Dodd | Australia | MF | 2006 | 2 | 1 | |
| Tarek Elrich | Australia | DF | 2015 | 3 | 0 | |
| Eugene Galekovic | Australia | GK | 2009–2013 | 8 | 0 | |
| Joe Gauci | Australia | GK | 2023–2024 | 2 | 0 | |
| Craig Goodwin | Australia | MF | 2016; 2019; 2022–2023; 2025– | 14 | 2 | |
| Nestory Irankunda | Australia | MF | 2024 | 2 | 1 | |
| Daniel Mullen | Australia | DF | 2009 | 1 | 0 | |
| Paul Reid | Australia | MF | 2009 | 2 | 0 | |
| Kristian Sarkies | Australia | MF | 2008 | 1 | 0 | |
| Michael Valkanis | Australia | DF | 2006 | 1 | 0 | |
| Dario Vidosic | Australia | MF | 2013 | 4 | 0 | |
