= Adam Sarota =

Australian soccer player

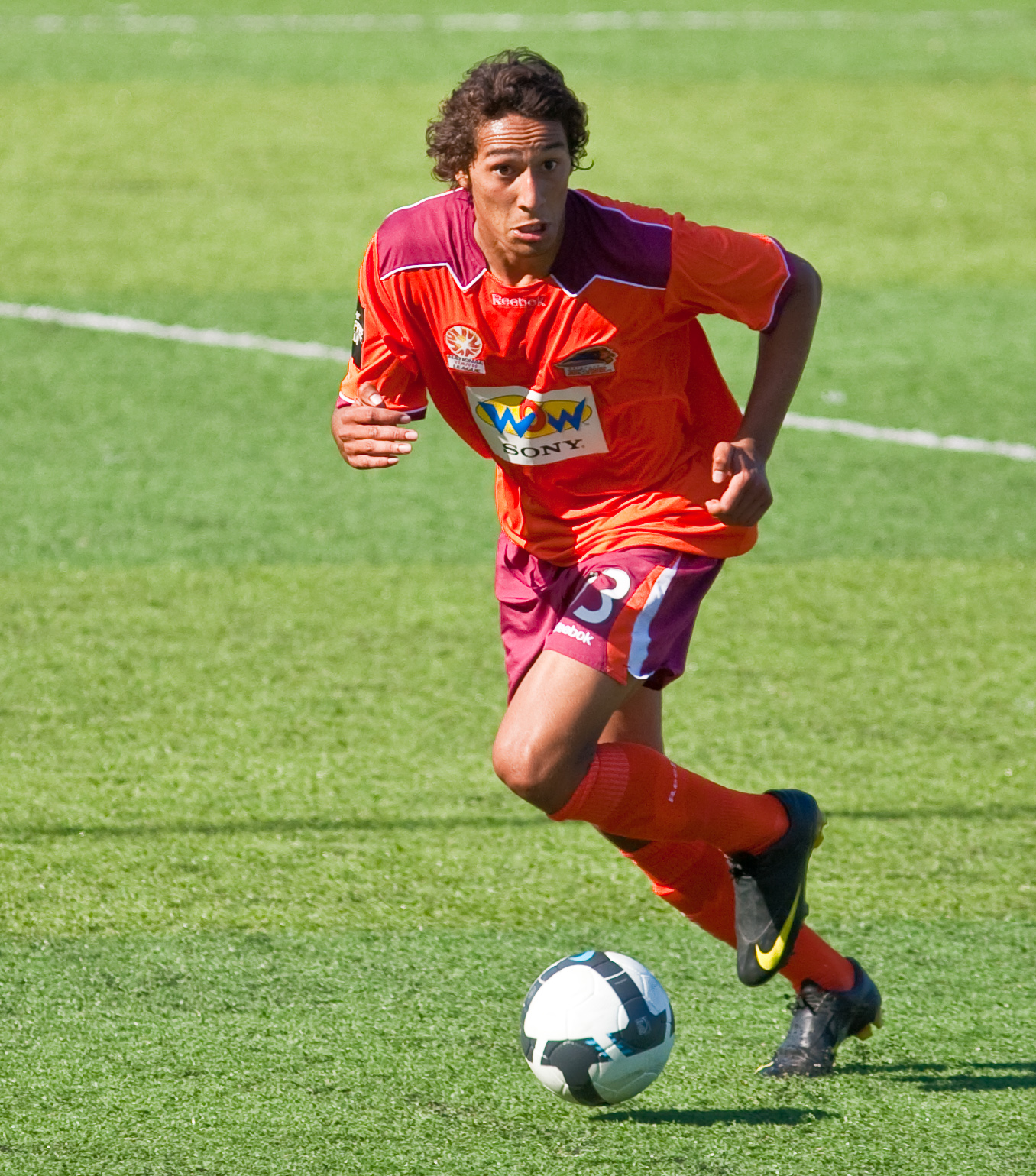
- Sarota with Brisbane Roar in 2009

Personal information
- Full name: Adam Tomek Sarota
- Date of birth: 28 December 1988 (age 37)
- Place of birth: Gordonvale, Queensland, Australia
- Height: 1.80 m (5 ft 11 in)
- Position: Central midfielder

Team information
- Current team: Caboolture Sports

Youth career
- Brisbane City
- Pine Rivers
- 2006–2007: Köln
- 2008–2009: Brisbane Roar

Senior career*
Years	Team	Apps	(Gls)
2008	Brisbane Strikers	9	(3)
2008–2010	Brisbane Roar	15	(0)
2010–2016	Utrecht	48	(0)
2014–2015	→ Brisbane Roar (loan)	12	(0)
2016	Go Ahead Eagles	13	(0)
2018	Brisbane Strikers	0	(0)
2018	Cairns FC	0	(0)
2019–	Caboolture Sports	5	(0)

International career^{‡}
2007	Australia U20	2	(0)
2011–2012	Australia	3	(0)
- * Club domestic league appearances and goals as of 12 August 2020 ‡ National team caps and goals as of 25 February 2014

Adam Tomek Sarota (born 28 December 1988) is an Australian soccer player who plays as a central midfielder.

== Career ==
=== Club ===
==== Brisbane Roar ====
Sarota was named National Youth League Player of the Year for 2008–2009. As a result of his solid performances for the Brisbane Roar youth team, he was rewarded with a first team contract prior to the 2009–10 A-League season. On 2 November 2008 he made his A-League debut for the Brisbane Roar against the Newcastle Jets.

==== Utrecht ====
On 2 April 2010, along with fellow Brisbane Roar players, Michael Zullo and Tommy Oar, Sarota joined Dutch side Utrecht on a three-year deal, in a collective transfer deal rumoured to be worth in excess of A$1.8 million. On 22 July 2010, Adam made his Utrecht debut coming on in the 70th minute of their away draw to Tirana in the UEFA Europa League.

==== Loan to Brisbane Roar ====
On 20 September 2014, Sarota was loaned to Brisbane Roar for a season to add squad depth across all positions.

=== International career ===
On 27 August 2010, it was reported Sarota had been invited to a training camp by the Polish Football Association. Sarota's father, Tony, emigrated to Australia from Poland but said that whilst Poland was a possibility, the Socceroos were Sarota's preferred option.

Sarota received his first Socceroos call up by coach Holger Osieck for a friendly match against Germany played on 27 March 2011. He made his international debut for Australia in August 2011, coming on as a substitute for FC Utrecht teammate Michael Zullo in a win over Wales.

After sustaining a serious knee and ankle injury in 2016, Sarota was injured for over 12 months and subsequently retired from professional football.

== Career statistics ==
As of 20 September 2014

Club	Season	Division	League		Cup		Continental		Total	
Club	Season	Division	Apps	Goals	Apps	Goals	Apps	Goals	Apps	Goals
Brisbane Roar	2008–09	A-League	2	0	—		—		2	0
Brisbane Roar	2009–10	A-League	13	0	—		—		13	0
Brisbane Roar	2014–15	A-League	12	0	0	0	0	0	12	0
Brisbane Roar	Total		27	0	0	0	0	0	27	0
Utrecht	2010–11	Eredivisie	6	0	0	0	2 (Note: Appearances in the 2010–11 UEFA Europa League)	0	8	0
Utrecht	2011–12	Eredivisie	8	0	0	0	—		8	0
Utrecht	2012–13	Eredivisie	18	0	1	0	—		19	0
Utrecht	2013–14	Eredivisie	15	0	0	0	0	0	15	0
Utrecht	2014–15	Eredivisie	1	0	0	0	—		1	0
Utrecht	Total		48	0	1	0	2	0	54	0
Go Ahead Eagles	2015–16	Eerste Divisie	13	0	0	0	—		13	0
Career total			76	0	1	0	2	0	82	0

== Honours ==
=== Individual ===
- National Youth League Player of the Year: 2008–09
