= Tommy Oar =

Australian soccer player

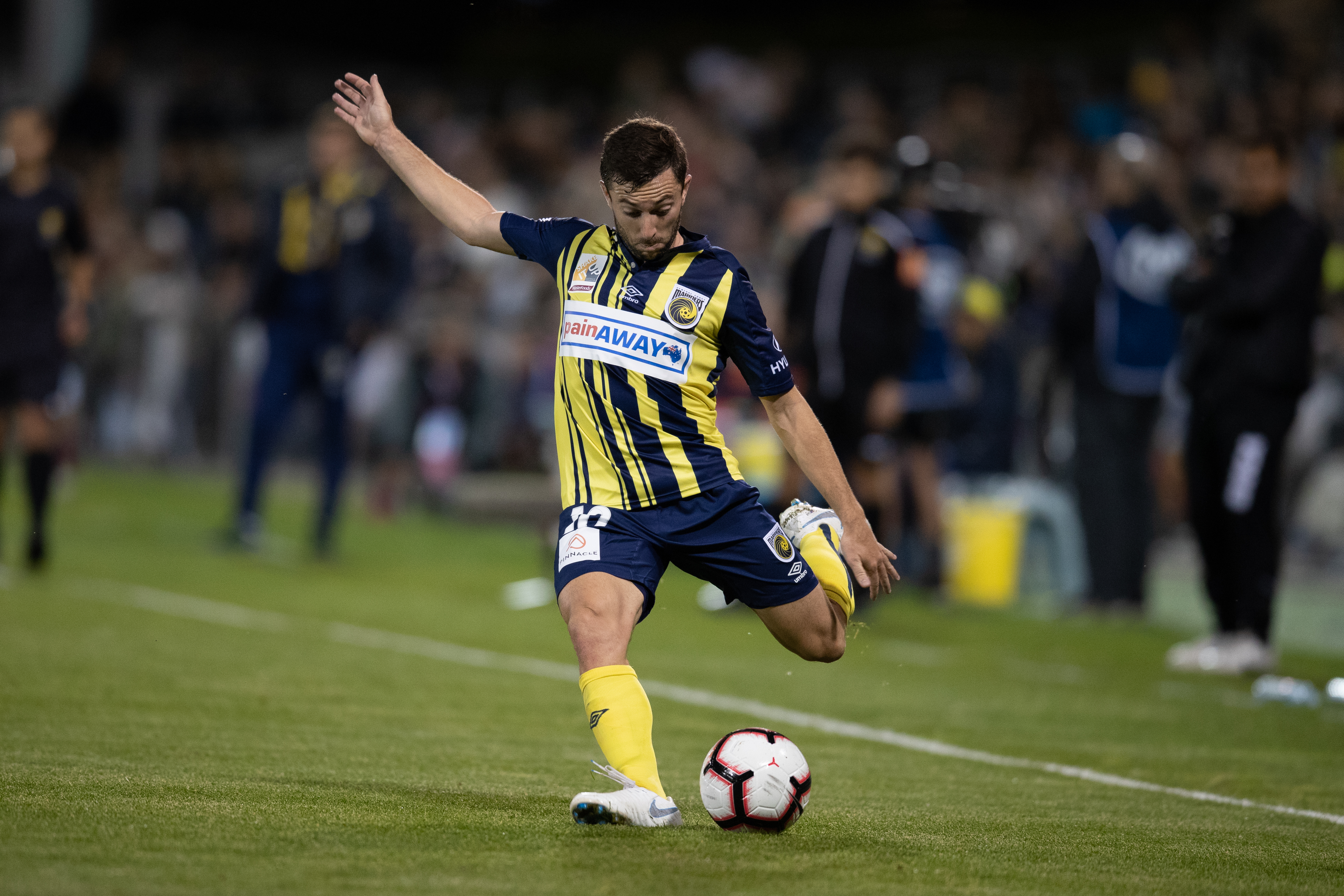
- Oar playing for the Central Coast Mariners in 2018

Personal information
- Full name: Thomas Michael Oar
- Date of birth: 10 December 1991 (age 34)
- Place of birth: Southport, Queensland, Australia
- Height: 1.70 m (5 ft 7 in)
- Position: Midfielder

Youth career
- 1996–1997: Burleigh Heads
- 1997–2006: Palm Beach
- 2006–2007: QAS

Senior career*
Years	Team	Apps	(Gls)
2007–2010	Brisbane Roar	23	(2)
2010–2015	FC Utrecht	105	(4)
2015–2016	Ipswich Town	6	(0)
2016–2017	Brisbane Roar	30	(1)
2017–2018	APOEL	19	(0)
2018–2020	Central Coast Mariners	31	(0)
2020–2022	Macarthur FC	39	(2)
Total		253	(9)

International career^{‡}
2008–2011	Australia U20	34	(6)
2010–2015	Australia	28	(2)
Medal record
Representing Australia
Men's Association football
AFC Asian Cup
Winner	2015 Australia
Runner-up	2011 Qatar
AFC U-20 Asian Cup
Runner-up	2010 China
- * Club domestic league appearances and goals as of 19 July 2022 ‡ National team caps and goals as of 20 February 2016

Thomas Michael Oar (born 10 December 1991) is a retired Australian professional footballer who played as a midfielder.

Born on the Gold Coast, Queensland, Oar played youth football for Burleigh Heads, Palm Beach and at the Queensland Academy of Sport before making his professional debut for Brisbane Roar in 2008. He joined Dutch club FC Utrecht in 2010, making over 100 appearances for the side before moving to England to play for Ipswich Town in 2015. He later joined Cypriot giants Apoel Nicosia, before returning to the A-League.

Oar has twenty eight caps with the Australian national team, scoring two goals. He participated in the 2014 FIFA World Cup and the 2011 and 2015 Asian Cups, with Australia winning the latter. He was part of the Australia U-20 side at the 2009 and 2011 FIFA U-20 World Cups, scoring the goal of the tournament in the latter edition. He was also nominated for the Socceroos' 2010 FIFA World Cup squad at 18.

== Early life ==
Oar's paternal grandparents have Basque heritage.

Oar attended All Saints Anglican School on the Gold Coast graduating in 2008. Oar previously played at Palm Beach Sharks football club on the Gold Coast and eventually the Queensland Academy of Sport, where he was picked by Brisbane Roar.

== Club career ==
=== Queensland Roar ===
Oar signed a three-year contract with Queensland Roar ahead of the 2008–09 A-League. He made his A-League debut for the side on 14 December 2008, coming on in the 73rd minute of a late 2–1 win over Newcastle Jets. In his second A-League appearance, on 28 December 2008, Oar scored a late free kick to secure a win over Wellington Phoenix.

Oar won the A-League Young Footballer of the Year award for the 2009–10 A-League.

=== FC Utrecht ===
In January 2010, Oar signed with Dutch agent Rob Jansen and was linked with a move at the end of the 2009–10 season to Eredivisie squad Feyenoord Rotterdam and trained with FC Utrecht with fellow Roar players, Michael Zullo and Adam Sarota.

In March 2010 he was award the Rising Star award for the Best Young Player and selected in the A-League Team of the Year. On 2 April 2010 he, along with fellow Roar players Michael Zullo and Adam Sarota, joined FC Utrecht on a five-year deal, in a collective transfer deal said to be worth in excess of A$1.8 million. In December 2010 he made his European debut in a Europa League game against Liverpool FC at Anfield.

In the 2012–13 Eredivisie season Oar played every game in FC Utrecht's most successful season as they finished with 63 points and qualified for the Europa League. He was awarded 10th place in the Voetbal International Eredivisie player of the Year standings and was linked with clubs such as Benfica and Celtic F.C.

=== Ipswich Town ===
On 29 August 2015, it was announced Oar had signed a two-year contract with Championship side Ipswich Town. He made his debut for Ipswich in September 2015, starting in a loss to Manchester United in the League Cup. After a further substitute appearance against Blackburn Rovers in the Championship, Oar made his starting debut for Ipswich against Huddersfield Town. He was forced to come off at halftime with concussion.

Oar scored his first goal for Ipswich in a 2–2 draw against Portsmouth in the 2015–16 FA Cup in January 2016.

In January 2016, Ipswich announced that Oar would leave the club by mutual consent after he requested his contract be terminated. Oar played nine matches for Ipswich in all competitions, scoring one goal.

=== Return to Brisbane Roar ===
In 2016, Oar rejoined Brisbane Roar on a contract for 2.5 seasons following his stint in England. In February 2017, Oar scored and assisted in a 2–0 victory over Carlos Tevez's Shanghai Shenhua, to qualify for the Asian Champions League.

=== APOEL FC ===
Despite signing a marquee contract with Brisbane Roar, Oar joined Cypriot club APOEL in June 2017. Oar made his competitive debut for APOEL in a UEFA Champions League qualifying win over Dudelange on 12 July 2017. During his time with APOEL, Oar was used as a utility player, playing all positions across the midfield and at left back.

=== Central Coast Mariners ===
In September 2018, Oar joined Central Coast Mariners on a two-year contract. He made his debut against his former club Brisbane Roar in a 1–1 draw. In his second season, Oar was regularly chosen as club captain when regular captain Matt Simon was not on the field. He was also used in a variety of different positions, including midfield, striker, and left back.

=== Macarthur FC ===
On 15 January 2020, Macarthur FC announced Oar as their inaugural signing, starting from the 2020–21 A-League season. He has predominantly been used as a defensive midfielder during his time at the club. During the 2021/2022 A-League Season, Oar scored two long distance volleys which were both nominated for Goal of the Season. In July 2022, Oar announced his retirement from football.

== International career ==
On 22 December 2009 Oar was named in the Australian national team squad for the 2011 Asian Cup qualifier against Kuwait but did not play. He then made his debut on 3 March 2010 in a 1–0 win over Indonesia, again in the 2011 Asian Cup qualifiers, wearing the number 121 shirt and thus became the first player to use a three-digit number in an international association football match. His performance in this match led to comparisons to Harry Kewell and the potential for Oar to succeed the Australian great, and resulted in his selection in the 2010 FIFA World Cup squad. In August 2011 he played in the U-20 World Cup in Colombia where he scored a 30-yard free kick in the last minute of the game against Ecuador to level 1–1. The goal went on to be voted Goal of the Tournament. In 2013, Oar scored his first full international goal in a World Cup Qualifier against Japan. The matched finished 1–1, the goal aiding Australia's efforts to qualify for the 2014 World Cup. Oar was later named as part of Australia's 2014 FIFA World Cup squad, where he started and played in all the respective group matches, and later in the 2015 Asian Cup squad.

== Post Career ==
=== Media ===
After retiring from football in 2022, Oar transitioned into a career in media, working as a TV pundit.

== Career statistics ==
=== Club ===
As of 3 February 2022

Club	Season	Division	League		National Cup		League Cup		Continental		Total	
Club	Season	Division	Apps	Goals	Apps	Goals	Apps	Goals	Apps	Goals	Apps	Goals
Brisbane Roar	2008–09	A-League	5	1	–		–		–		5	1
Brisbane Roar	2009–10	A-League	18	1	–		–		–		18	1
Brisbane Roar	Total		23	2	–		–		–		23	2
FC Utrecht	2010–11	Eredivisie	7	0	0	0	–		4 (Note: Appearances in UEFA Europa League)	0	11	0
FC Utrecht	2011–12	Eredivisie	18	2	1	1	–		–		19	3
FC Utrecht	2012–13	Eredivisie	31	1	1	0	–		–		32	1
FC Utrecht	2013–14	Eredivisie	31	1	3	0	–		2	0	36	1
FC Utrecht	2014–15	Eredivisie	18	0	1	0	–		–		19	0
FC Utrecht	Total		105	4	6	1	–		6	0	117	5
Ipswich Town	2015–16	Championship	6	0	2	1	1	0	–		9	1
Brisbane Roar	2015–16	A-League	6	0	0	0	–		0	0	6	0
Brisbane Roar	2016–17	A-League	24	1	1	0	–		5 (Note: Appearances in AFC Champions League)	1	30	2
Brisbane Roar	Total		30	1	1	0	–		5	1	36	2
APOEL	2017–18	Cypriot First Division	19	0	4	0	–		4 (Note: Appearances in UEFA Champions League)	0	27	0
Central Coast Mariners	2018–19	A-League	11	0	0	0	–		–		11	0
Central Coast Mariners	2019–20	A-League	20	0	4	0	–		–		24	0
Central Coast Mariners	Total		31	0	4	0	–		–		35	0
Macarthur FC	2020–21	A-League	21	0	0	0	–		–		21	0
Macarthur FC	2021–22	A-League	18	2	2	0	–		–		20	2
Macarthur FC	Total		39	2	2	0	–		–		41	2
Career total			253	9	19	2	1	0	15	1	288	12

=== International ===
As of match played 17 November 2015

Appearances and goals by national team and year
National team	Year	Apps	Goals
Australia
Australia	2010	3	0
Australia	2011	1	0
Australia	2012	2	0
Australia	2013	6	1
Australia	2014	9	0
Australia	2015	7	1
Total		28	2

Scores and results lists Australia's goals first, score column indicates score after each Oar goal.

No	Date	Venue	Opponent	Score	Result	Competition
1	4 June 2013	Saitama Stadium 2002, Saitama, Japan	Japan	1–0	1–1	2014 FIFA World Cup qualification
2	17 June 2015	Spartak Stadium, Bishkek, Kyrgyzstan	Kyrgyzstan	2–0	2–1	2018 FIFA World Cup qualification

== Honours ==
APOEL

- Cypriot First Division: 2017–18

Australia

- AFC Asian Cup: 2015; runner-up 2011

Australia U-20

- AFC U-20 Asian Cup: runner-up 2010
- AFF U-19 Youth Championship: 2008

Individual

- A-League Young Player of the Year: 2009–10
- PFA A-League Team of the Season: 2009–10
- FFA U20 Footballer of the Year: 2010
- FIFA U-20 World Cup Goal of the Tournament: 2011
- Eredivisie Top 10 Pro Klassement Player of the Year: 2013
