= Carmichael Park =

Park in California, United States

Coordinates: 38°37′39″N 121°19′51″W

Carmichael Park is a major 38-acre (150,000 m^{2}) park in Carmichael, California, an unincorporated suburb of Sacramento, California. The park includes 5 ballfields, 6 tennis courts and a dog park. The Community Clubhouse, Veterans' Memorial Building, the Daniel Bishop Memorial Pavilion for the Performing Arts, and the Great Wall of Carmichael are all located within the park.
