= Matt Mundy =

Australian soccer player

Personal information
- Full name: Matthew Benjamin Mundy
- Date of birth: 8 May 1987 (age 39)
- Place of birth: Canberra, Australia
- Height: 1.81 m (5 ft 11 in)
- Position: Centre back

Team information
- Current team: Olympic FC
- Number: 6

Youth career
- Souths United
- 2003–2004: QAS

Senior career*
Years	Team	Apps	(Gls)
2005–2008	Rochedale Rovers	74	(4)
2008–2012	Brisbane Roar	29	(0)
2012	Rochedale Rovers		
2013–	Olympic FC	180	(6)
- * Club domestic league appearances and goals as of 21 September 2022

Matt Mundy is an Australian footballer who plays for Olympic FC.

== Club career ==
He made his A-League debut for the Brisbane Roar on 4 October 2008 against Sydney FC.

== Honors ==
With Brisbane Roar:

- A-League Premiership: 2010–2011
- A-League Championship: 2010–2011

== A-League statistics ==
Club	Season	League^{1}		Cup		International^{2}		Total	
Club	Season	Apps	Goals	Apps	Goals	Apps	Goals	Apps	Goals
Brisbane Roar	2008–09	4	0	0	0	0	0	4	0
Brisbane Roar	2009–10	8	0	0	0	0	0	8	0
Brisbane Roar	2010–11	16	0	0	0	0	0	16	0
Brisbane Roar	2011–12	1	0	0	0	0	0	1	0
Total		29	0					29	0

^{1} – includes A-League final series statistics
^{2} – includes FIFA Club World Cup statistics; AFC Champions League statistics are included in season commencing after group stages (i.e. ACL and A-League seasons etc.)
