= Marcus Wedau =

German footballer

Personal information
- Date of birth: 31 December 1975 (age 50)
- Place of birth: Soltau, West Germany
- Height: 1.80 m (5 ft 11 in)
- Position: Midfielder

Senior career*
Years	Team	Apps	(Gls)
1993–1998	KFC Uerdingen 05	100	(9)
1998–2001	MSV Duisburg	64	(8)
2001–2002	LR Ahlen	8	(0)
2002–2005	Rot-Weiss Essen	73	(10)
2005–2006	VfL Osnabrück	24	(1)
2006–2007	Queensland Roar	10	(0)
2007–2008	KFC Uerdingen 05	11	(1)
Total		290	(29)

International career
1994	Germany U18	1	(0)
1995–1998	Germany U21	12	(3)
- * Club domestic league appearances and goals

Marcus Wedau (born 31 December 1975) is a German former professional footballer who played as a midfielder.

== International career ==
Wedau made 12 appearances for the Germany U21 national team scoring three goals.
