= Michael Zullo =

Australian soccer player

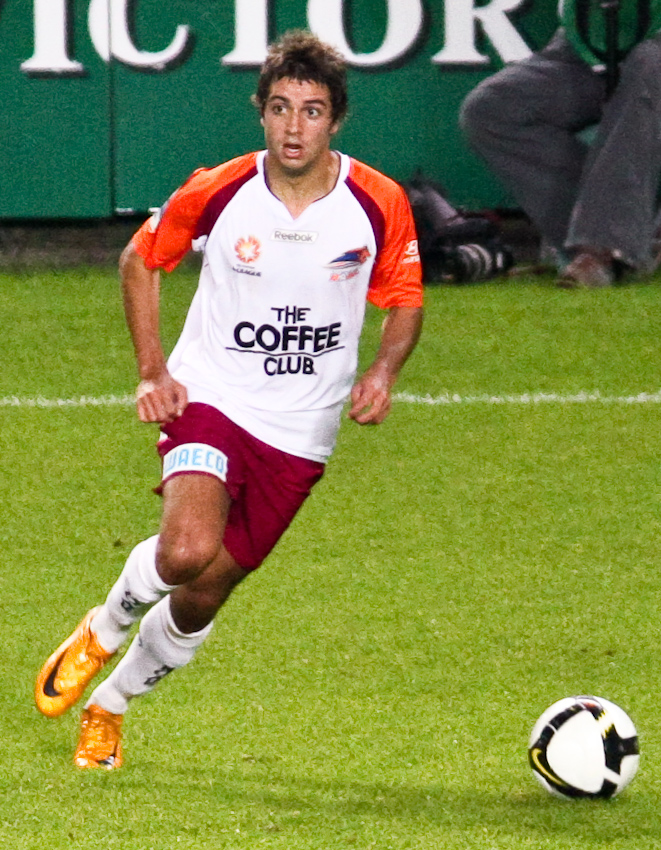
- Zullo playing for Brisbane Roar in 2008

Personal information
- Full name: Michael Anthony Zullo
- Date of birth: 11 September 1988 (age 38)
- Place of birth: Brisbane, Australia
- Height: 1.70 m (5 ft 7 in)
- Position: Left-back

Youth career
- Brisbane City

Senior career*
Years	Team	Apps	(Gls)
2005–2007	Brisbane Strikers		
2007–2010	Brisbane Roar	53	(2)
2010–2015	Utrecht	34	(0)
2013–2014	→ Adelaide United (loan)	24	(0)
2015–2016	Melbourne City	15	(0)
2016–2022	Sydney FC	85	(2)
Total		211	(4)

International career^{‡}
2008	Australia U23	6	(1)
2009–2013	Australia	10	(0)
- * Club domestic league appearances and goals as of 17 May 2022 ‡ National team caps and goals as of 6 February 2013

Michael Zullo (born 11 September 1988) is an Australian professional footballer who last played as a left-back for Sydney FC of the A-League.

== Club career ==
After being signed by the former Brisbane Roar coach Frank Farina on a two-year contract, Zullo played five of the six opening games of the season, coming on as a substitute. On his first eleven debut against Wellington Phoenix, his sixth appearance for Queensland, he scored in the opening minutes of the game and set up a first half added-time goal for fellow youngster and close friend Robbie Kruse. He previously played in the Brisbane Premier League for the Brisbane Strikers During a match against Sydney FC, Zullo limped off the field with a torn thigh muscle which ruled him out for 6 weeks.

At the end of the 2008–09 season, Zullo received offers from Dutch Eredivisie clubs FC Groningen and NEC Nijmegen but declined both offers and cited his preference to stay in the A-League for another season.

On 2 April 2010, along with fellow Roar players, Thomas Oar and Adam Sarota, Zullo joined Dutch side Utrecht on a three-year deal, in a collective transfer deal rumoured to be worth in excess of A$1.8 million. He made his debut for Utrecht in a 1–1 draw with NEC Nijmegen on 28 February 2011, coming off the bench on the 81st minute.

On 29 August 2013, he signed a one-year loan deal with Australian A-League club Adelaide United.

On 14 July 2015, Zullo signed a one-year deal with Melbourne City.

On 11 May 2016, Zullo signed a two-year deal with Sydney FC. In his first season at the Sky Blues, he played an influential role as an attacking fullback, assisting three goals and forming a good partnership with left winger Miloš Ninković.

Zullo scored his first goal for Sydney FC in a 3–2 win over Wellington Phoenix.

In January 2018, Zullo committed his future to Sydney FC for a further two seasons.

On 16 May 2022, Zullo departed Sydney FC after six seasons with the club.

== International career ==
Due to outstanding form since making his debut for Brisbane Roar, Zullo was called up for the first time for the Australia national under-23 football team before their qualifier against Iraq, in which they won 2–0.

He was also a train-on player with the national U-17 squad, the Joeys, at 2005 FIFA U-17 World Championship in Peru.

On 28 January 2009, Zullo made his full international debut, coming on as a substitute in a 0–0 draw with Indonesia in the group stage of qualifying for the 2011 AFC Asian Cup.

== Personal life ==
Zullo attended Villanova College in the Brisbane suburb of Coorparoo, playing for the schools first XI. Zullo and his wife Georgia have three children, one set of twin boys and one other boy.

== Career statistics ==
=== Club ===
As of match played 17 May 2022

Appearances and goals by club, season and competition
Club	Season	Division	League		Cup		Continental		Total	
Club	Season	Division	Apps	Goals	Apps	Goals	Apps	Goals	Apps	Goals
Brisbane Roar	2007–08	A-League	17	1	2	0	—		19	1
Brisbane Roar	2008–09	A-League	23	1	2	1	—		25	2
Brisbane Roar	2009–10	A-League	13	0	0	0	—		13	0
Brisbane Roar	Total		53	2	4	1	—		57	3
FC Utrecht	2010–11	Eredivisie	6	0	0	0	0	0	6	0
FC Utrecht	2011–12	Eredivisie	15	0	1	0	—		16	0
FC Utrecht	2012–13	Eredivisie	13	0	1	0	0	0	13	0
FC Utrecht	Total		34	0	2	0	0	0	35	0
Adelaide United	2013–14	A-League	24	0	0	0	—		24	0
Melbourne City	2015–16	A-League	15	0	1	0	—		15	0
Sydney FC	2016–17	A-League	28	0	3	0	—		31	0
Sydney FC	2017–18	A-League	20	1	5	0	4	0	29	1
Sydney FC	2018–19	A-League	25	1	5	0	4	0	34	1
Sydney FC	2019–20	A-League	11	0	1	0	2	0	14	0
Sydney FC	2020–21	A-League	1	0	0	0	—		1	0
Sydney FC	2021–22	A-League	0	0	0	0	0	0	0	0
Sydney FC	Total		85	2	14	0	10	0	109	2
Career total			211	4	21	1	10	0	240	5

=== International ===
As of match played 6 February 2013

Appearances and goals by national team and year
National team	Year	Apps	Goals
Australia	2009	2	0
Australia	2010	0	0
Australia	2011	7	0
Australia	2013	1	0
Total		10	0

== Honours ==
=== Club ===
Brisbane Strikers

- Brisbane Premier League Premiership: 2006
- Brisbane Premier League Championship: 2006

Sydney FC

- A-League Premiership: 2016–17, 2017–18, 2019–20
- A-League Championship: 2016-17, 2018–19, 2019–20
- FFA Cup: 2017

=== Individual ===
- PFA A-League Team of the Season: 2016–17
