= André Gumprecht =

German footballer

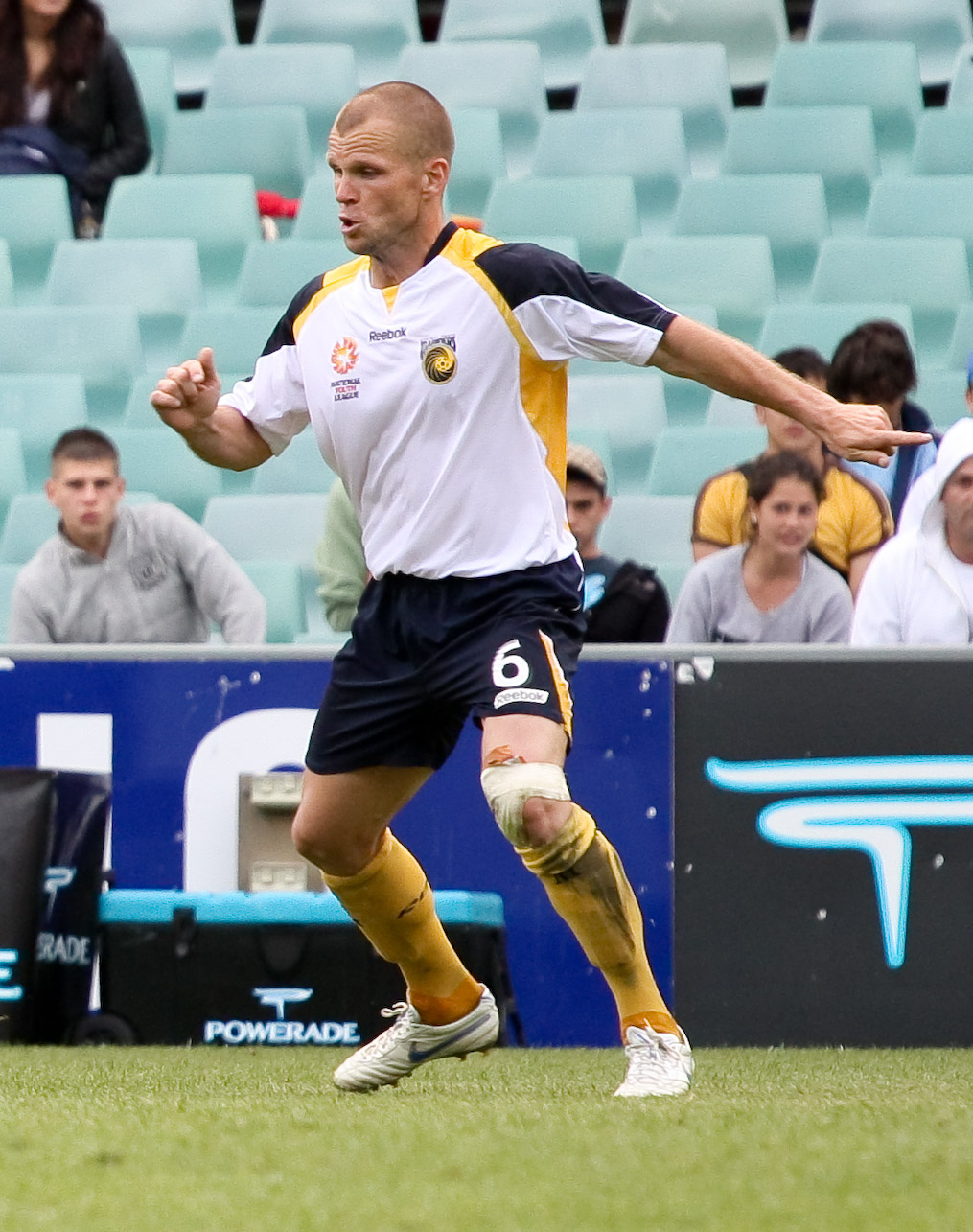
- Gumprecht during his time at Central Coast Mariners

Personal information
- Date of birth: 26 November 1974 (age 51)
- Place of birth: Jena, East Germany
- Height: 1.78 m (5 ft 10 in)
- Position: Midfielder

Team information
- Current team: Weston Bears fc

Youth career
- 1988–1991: Carl Zeiss Jena
- 1991–1992: Bayer Leverkusen

Senior career*
Years	Team	Apps	(Gls)
1992–1993	Bayer Leverkusen	0	(0)
1993–1995	Lecce	9	(0)
1995	Preussen Köln	12	(2)
1995–1998	SG Wattenscheid 09	59	(1)
1998–1999	Bayer Leverkusen II	27	(0)
1999–2001	Hallescher FC	60	(5)
2001–2002	FSV Zwickau	33	(1)
2002	Dresdner SC	0	(0)
2002–2003	Perth Glory	34	(4)
2003–2004	Parramatta Power	25	(2)
2004	SAFFC	14	(0)
2005–2009	Central Coast Mariners	63	(4)
2008	→ Bankstown City Lions (loan)	9	(0)
2009	Bonnyrigg White Eagles	5	(0)
2010	Sydney Olympic	3	(0)
2010–2013	Lake Macquarie City	26	(2)
2013–2014	Woongarrah Wildcats	21	(0)
2015–2020	Kahibah FC	70	(3)

Managerial career
- 2010: Sydney Olympic
- 2009–2011: Newcastle Jets W-League (Asst. Manager)
- 2013–2014: Woongarrah Wildcats (Player / Coach)
- 2015–2020: Kahibah FC
- 2020–2021: Belmont Swansea United
- * Club domestic league appearances and goals

André Gumprecht (born 26 November 1974) is a German former professional footballer who is currently the Technical Director of the Junior Development League (JDL) program at the Central Coast Mariners FC, Head of Football at Central Coast Sports College, and head coach of Berkeley Vale SC, a semi-professional club in Australia.

== Club career ==
Gumprecht was born in Jena, East Germany. He was awarded the Central Coast Mariners Members player of the year award for his 2005–06 season at the Mariners. Before he played for the Mariners he won the NSL championship with Perth Glory and then lost in the last NSL grand final with Parramatta Power before the competition became defunct.

Gumprecht played in Germany for ten years prior to joining Perth Glory in 2002. There he reached the highest level when he played in the seasons 1995–96 and 1997–98 altogether 27 matches in the second division for SG Wattenscheid 09.

Off the field Gumprecht was a fan favourite. He was known to come to the fans' bar after games for a few drinks and when injured watches the Mariners away games with the fans. He also runs a youth training program on the Central Coast called Soccerpro.

Gumprecht signed a one-year deal to remain with the Central Coast Mariners for the 2008–09 season after spending much of the A-League off-season on loan at NSWPL club Bankstown City Lions. At Bankstown Andre was a key antagonist in a mid-season revival for the club. He went back to the Mariners after playing ten games for the Lions.

Gumprecht was released by the Mariners the day after their loss to Tianjin Teda, rounding off an Asian Champions League campaign to forget, where the Mariners did not win a single game.

After his release from Central Coast, Gumprecht was snapped up by New South Wales Premier League outfit Bonnyrigg White Eagles. In January 2010, he left the Bonnyrigg White Eagles and signed a two-year contract with Sydney Olympic. On 16 June 2010, he cancelled his contract and announced his retirement.

== Coaching career ==
In May 2010, Gumprecht was named as the new head coach of the Sydney Olympic Football Club, but he resigned as coach and player on 16 June 2010.

In September 2012 Woongarrah Wildcats FC announced the appointment of Andre Gumprecht as head of Coaching staff. Andre took up the role as Head Coach for 1st grade and mentored the Reserve grade coach, as well as a role in Junior Coaching & Development on a three-year term, stretching from 2013 to 2015 inclusively.

In October 2014, Gumprecht was announced as the new Technical Director of Kahibah FC for 2015.

In January 2013, Gumprecht accepted a full-time coaching position at the newly established International Football School in Kariong NSW (recently changed names to Central Coast Sports College). Andre continues to coach at the college students from kindergarten through to year 12 as a member of the football coaching staff.

On 27 October 2020, Gumprecht was announced via social media as the new head coach for Belmont Swansea United FC. Gumprecht had a brilliant start to life as head coach for the "Belswans." In his first 6 competitive games across all comps, he won 5 games and lost 1. In those 6 games, Belmont Swansea United FC played brilliant attacking football, scoring 29 goals and conceding 7. Gumprecht was named Weston Bears FC technical director in August 2021 .

== Controversy ==
In February 2008, Gumprecht attended 'Mad Monday' celebrations dressed as Adolf Hitler. He later apologized, stating he was educated on, and had knowledge of, what happened to the Jewish people at the hands of the Nazis. Football Federation Australia said that it would discipline Gumprecht.

== Honours ==
Central Coast Mariners

- A-League Premiership: 2007–08

Perth Glory

- NSL Championship: 2002–03

Individual

- Central Coast Mariners Members Player of the Year: 2005–06
