= Dario Vidošić =

Australian soccer player (born 1987)

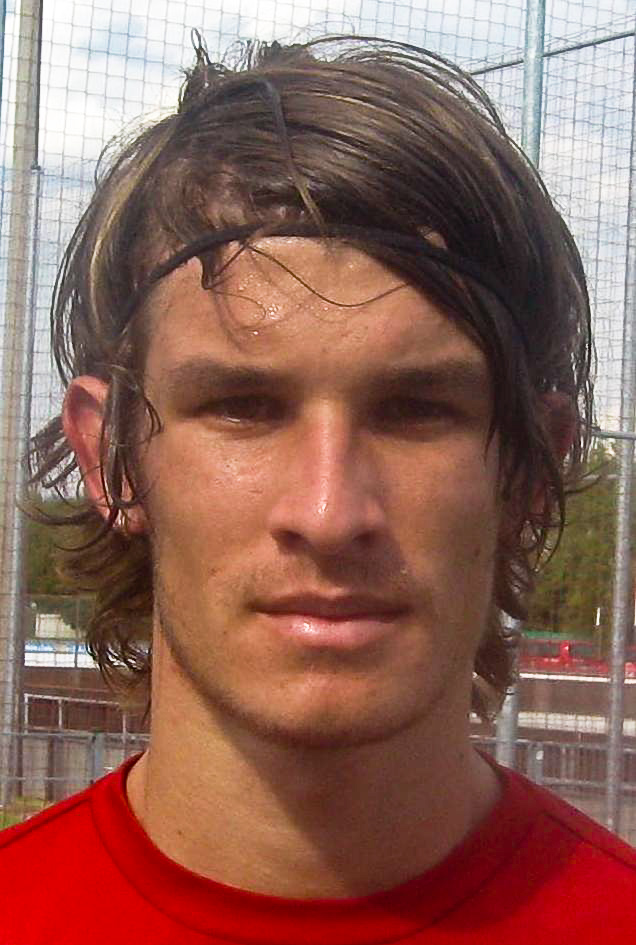
- Vidošić in 2009

Personal information
- Full name: Dario Vidošić
- Date of birth: 8 April 1987 (age 39)
- Place of birth: Osijek, SR Croatia, Yugoslavia
- Height: 1.84 m (6 ft 0 in)
- Positions: Attacking midfielder; winger

Youth career
- 2000–2005: Queensland Lions
- 2006: AIS

Senior career*
| Years | Team | Apps | (Gls) |
| 2006–2007 | Brisbane Roar | 17 | (5) |
| 2007–2011 | 1. FC Nürnberg | 30 | (3) |
| 2010 | → MSV Duisburg (loan) | 12 | (1) |
| 2011 | → Arminia Bielefeld (loan) | 14 | (1) |
| 2011–2013 | Adelaide United | 51 | (15) |
| 2013–2015 | Sion | 46 | (8) |
| 2015–2016 | Western Sydney Wanderers | 28 | (4) |
| 2016 | Liaoning Whowin | 13 | (2) |
| 2017 | Seongnam FC | 7 | (0) |
| 2017 | Wellington Phoenix | 10 | (4) |
| 2017–2019 | Melbourne City | 31 | (8) |
| 2019–2020 | ATK | 0 | (0) |
| 2021–2022 | Moreland Zebras | 12 | (5) |
| 2022 | Port Adelaide | 1 | (0) |
| Total | | 272 | (56) |

International career
| 2006 | Australia U20 | 8 | (2) |
| 2007–2008 | Australia U23 | 14 | (2) |
| 2009–2014 | Australia | 23 | (2) |

Managerial career
- 2022–2024: Melbourne City FC Women
- 2024–2026: Brighton & Hove Albion Women
- * Club domestic league appearances and goals

Dario Vidošić (/ˈdɑːrioʊ ˈvɪdəʃɪtʃ/ DAR-ee-oh VID-ə-shitch; Croatian pronunciation: [dâːrjo ʋîdoʃitɕ]; born 8 April 1987) is a Croatian-Australian former soccer player and current coach who was most recently the manager of Women's Super League club Brighton & Hove Albion. Born in Yugoslavia, he represented Australia at international level.

== Club career ==
=== Early life ===
Vidošić was born on 8 April 1987 in Osijek to Croatian parents, mother Jasna and father Rado Vidošić. He moved with his parents from Croatia to Australia in 1988 when his father received an offer to play for the Queensland Lions. The family settled in Brisbane, and he attended Yugumbir State School for his early education at Regents Park, when Dario grew up he attended Cavendish Road State High School. His father was known for his extended career in both the A-League Men & Women's leagues, consisting of both head coaching and assistant roles.

Vidošić played with Queensland Lions in 2004 and also competed in the 2004 National Schoolboys football competition. He received a scholarship to the Australian Institute of Sport and trained in their football (soccer) program before moving onto the A-League, signing a two-year contract with Queensland Roar at the start of the 2006–07 season.

=== Brisbane Roar ===
In Round 1, coming on as a substitute in the second half, Vidošić set up a goal for Scotsman Simon Lynch before scoring a goal himself. Vidošić started up front for Queensland Roar in Round 8 against Perth Glory and scored to make it 2–1 in the Roar's favour, before being substituted. In Round 17, with midfielder Matt McKay out injured, Vidošić started against the Central Coast Mariners and scored two goals; becoming the first player under the age of 21 to score 2 goals in an A-League game, and the first player under the age of 20 to score more than three goals in a season. Vidošić scored once more in the season, against Melbourne Victory in Round 20.

=== 1. FC Nürnberg ===
His performance in the season was enough for the Bundesliga club 1. FC Nürnberg to give him a two-week trial. 1. FC Nürnberg was a club that had strong Australian ties with four other players at the time, two of whom had come from the A-League the previous season. It was confirmed on 22 March 2007 that Vidošić had accepted a three-year contract with the Bundesliga club.

He was rarely used in his first season at the club, seeing just 60 minutes of playing time in four games for the Bundesliga side that was relegated at the end of the season. However, he was an integral part of the reserve side's promotion efforts that saw 1. FC Nürnberg II reach the newly organised Regionalliga Süd.

In the following season, he was hampered by injury trouble early on, seeing just three matches for the professional team and four – with one goal – for the reserve side before the winter break. He went on to unsuccessfully trial with Danish club Esbjerg fB.

Surprisingly, Vidošić appeared back on the scene when he was brought on in a first-team match against SC Freiburg in which he scored his first competitive goal for 1. FC Nürnberg, giving the team the 1–0 win at Dreisamstadion. After that match, Vidošić won more opportunities in the Nürnberg first-team scoring another crucial goal in a 1–0 win over FC Ingolstadt 04 in early May, before another a week later in the Franconian derby against Greuther Fürth which ended 1–1. Vidošić went on to help Nürnberg seal promotion back to the Bundesliga.

In an interview in May 2009, Vidošić admitted a debut call-up to the Australian national team would be a dream end to a great season.

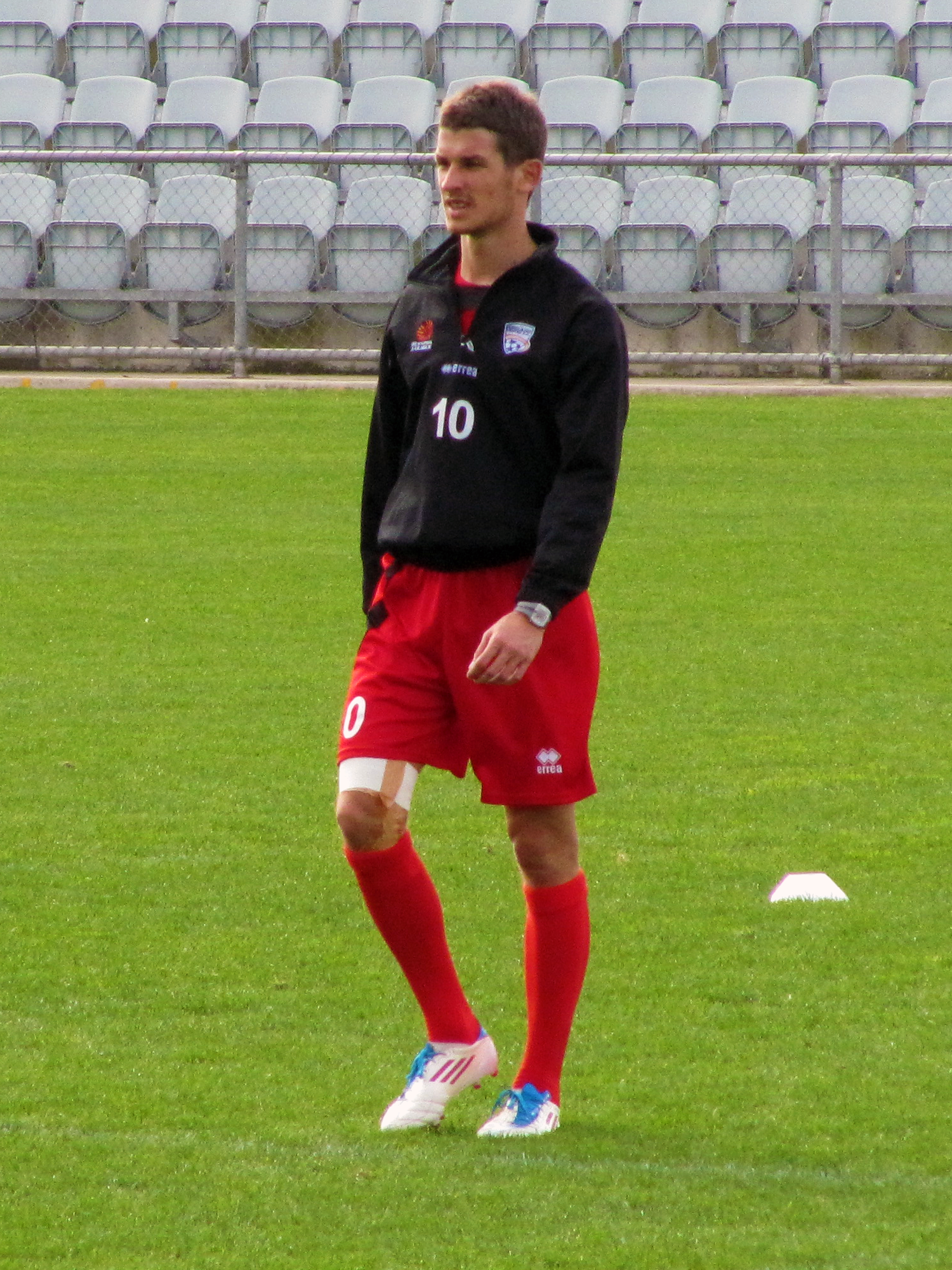
Vidošić training with Adelaide United in 2011

=== MSV Duisburg ===
On 19 January 2010, his club 1. FC Nürnberg announced that Vidošić would play on loan for MSV Duisburg the rest of the season.

=== Arminia Bielefeld ===
On 1 January 2011, Vidošić moved to Arminia Bielefeld on loan for the rest of the 2010–11 season after only making five appearances for Nürnberg prior to the loan.

=== Adelaide United ===
In July 2011, Vidošić returned to Australia and signed a three-year contract with A-League club Adelaide United as their Australian marquee on a reported AU$320,000 a season. He scored his first goal for the club in just his second game against Sydney F.C.

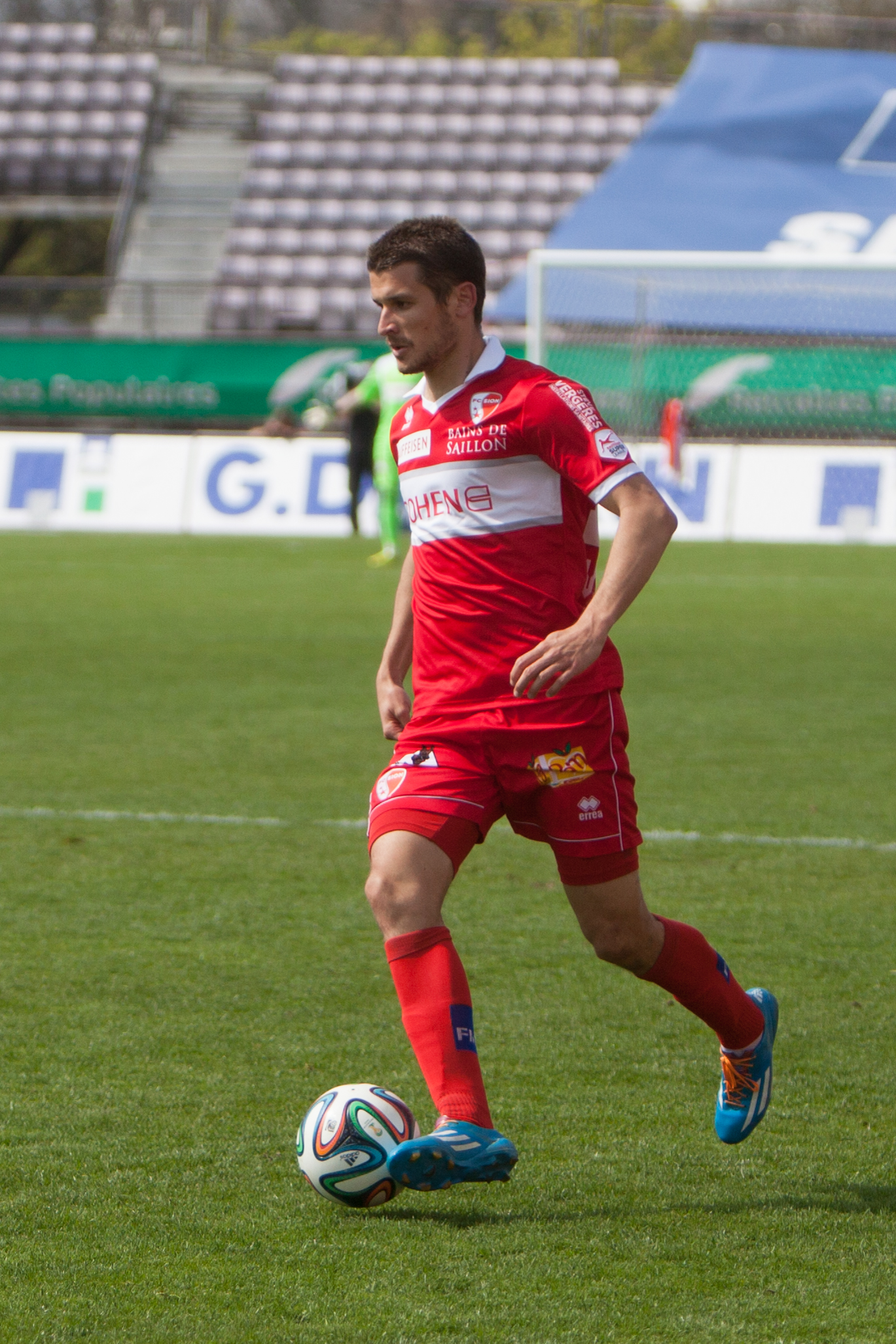
Vidošić playing for FC Sion in 2014

=== FC Sion ===
On 26 August 2013, Adelaide United announced that they had released Dario from his contract so he could continue his career playing for Swiss club FC Sion for a transfer fee of AU$700,000.

=== Western Sydney Wanderers ===
Western Sydney Wanderers confirmed that Vidošić has joined the club on a two-year deal on 21 September 2015.

=== Liaoning Whowin ===
Liaoning Whowin confirmed that Vidošić has joined the club on 22 June 2016. He was introduced right away into the starting line-up and made his debut the same week against Guangzhou R&F. Following changes to the Chinese Super League's foreign allowance and Liaoning Whowin signing Australians Robbie Kruse and James Holland, Vidošić was released along with his Australian teammate Michael Thwaite in February 2017.

=== Seongnam FC ===
On 17 February 2017, a Korean media reported his move to Seongnam FC as a free agent. In June 2017, Vidošić's contract was officially terminated by mutual consent.

=== Wellington Phoenix ===
On 4 August 2017, it was reported that Vidošić would be joining his father Rado at Wellington Phoenix on a one-year deal. On 20 December 2017, both Vidošić and his father left the club.

=== Melbourne City ===
On 29 December 2017, shortly after leaving Wellington Phoenix, Vidošić joined Melbourne City.

=== ATK ===
In July 2019, ATK confirmed that they had signed Vidošić as their final foreign signing for the 2019–20 ISL season. His start to his career with ATK was rough, as he sustained an injury in preseason that kept him out of action for the first half of the season.

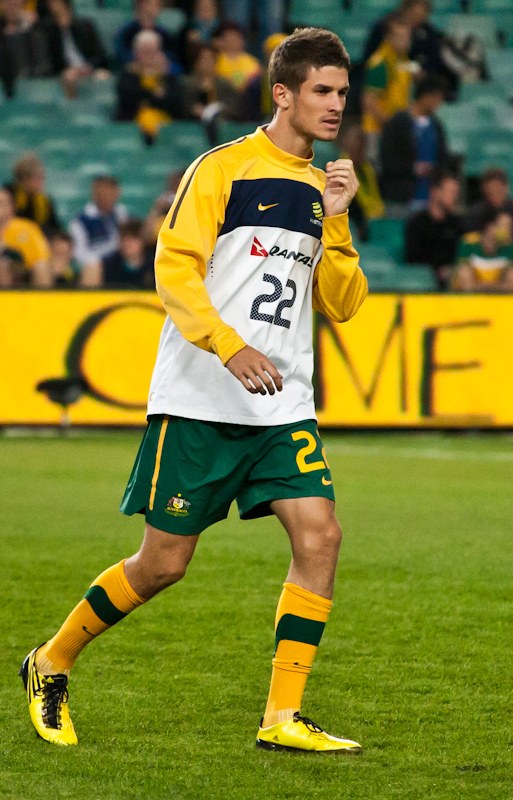
Vidošić with Australia in 2010

== International career ==
In October 2006, Vidošić was selected in the Australian Under-20 squad, known as the Young Socceroos, and went on to compete in the 2006 AFC Youth Championships in India. In February 2007, he played for the Australian Under-23 team, the Olyroos, in an Olympic qualifier in Adelaide, scoring the 11th goal in Australia's 11–0 win over Chinese Taipei.

In July 2008, after being left out of the Australian Olympic team for Beijing by Olyroos head coach Graham Arnold, he publicly mooted the possibility of playing for the Croatian national team at a senior level. However, according to FIFA Article 18, Vidošić has been ineligible to represent any country other than Australia in international football since April 2008, when he turned 21.

On 17 June 2009, Vidošić made his debut for the Socceroos in their last World Cup qualifier against Japan, he was substituted in for Tim Cahill in the 86th minute. His second cap was received while playing in a friendly against the Netherlands on 10 October 2009.

== Coaching career ==
=== Melbourne City ===
Vidošić began his coaching career in Melbourne City FC's boys’ academy before taking the opportunity to become an assistant coach at Melbourne City Women working alongside his father, Rado Vidošić.

After his father was appointed head coach of the men's first team in early 2023, Vidošić was promoted to head coach of Melbourne City Women. In his first full season in charge, Vidošić lifted the A-League Women Premiers Plate and secured qualification for the inaugural AFC Women's Champions League.

=== Brighton & Hove Albion Women ===
On 10 July 2024, Vidošić was appointed head coach of English Women's Super League club Brighton & Hove Albion Women on a three-year contract.

During the 2025–26 WSL season, Vidošić led Brighton to the Women's FA Cup final for the first time in the club's history. The team secured their place in the final with a 2–0 victory over Arsenal in the quarter-finals, followed by a 3–2 comeback win against Liverpool in the semi-finals.

On 28 August 2026, it was announced that Vidošić had left his role at Brighton to pursue a "new opportunity".

== Career statistics ==
=== Club ===
As of 6 May 2016

Appearances and goals by club, season and competition
| Club | Season | League | | | Cup | | Continental | | Total | |
| Club | Season | Division | Apps | Goals | Apps | Goals | Apps | Goals | Apps | Goals |
|---|---|---|---|---|---|---|---|---|---|---|
| Queensland Roar | 2006–07 | A-League | 17 | 5 | 5 | 2 | 0 | 0 | 22 | 7 |
| 1. FC Nürnberg | 2007–08 | Bundesliga | 4 | 0 | 0 | 0 | 0 | 0 | 4 | 0 |
| 1. FC Nürnberg | 2008–09 | 2. Bundesliga | 12 | 3 | 0 | 0 | 0 | 0 | 12 | 3 |
| 1. FC Nürnberg | 2009–10 | Bundesliga | 9 | 0 | 1 | 0 | 0 | 0 | 10 | 0 |
| 1. FC Nürnberg | 2010–11 | Bundesliga | 5 | 0 | 0 | 0 | 0 | 0 | 5 | 0 |
| 1. FC Nürnberg | Total | | 30 | 3 | 1 | 0 | 0 | 0 | 31 | 3 |
| MSV Duisburg (loan) | 2009–10 | 2. Bundesliga | 12 | 1 | 0 | 0 | 0 | 0 | 12 | 1 |
| Arminia Bielefeld (loan) | 2010–11 | 2. Bundesliga | 15 | 1 | 0 | 0 | 0 | 0 | 15 | 1 |
| Adelaide United | 2011–12 | A-League | 25 | 5 | 0 | 0 | 9 | 0 | 34 | 5 |
| Adelaide United | 2012–13 | A-League | 26 | 10 | 0 | 0 | 0 | 0 | 26 | 10 |
| Adelaide United | Total | | 51 | 15 | 0 | 0 | 9 | 0 | 60 | 15 |
| FC Sion | 2013–14 | Swiss Super League | 29 | 6 | 2 | 0 | 0 | 0 | 31 | 6 |
| FC Sion | 2014–15 | Swiss Super League | 17 | 2 | 3 | 0 | 0 | 0 | 20 | 2 |
| FC Sion | Total | | 46 | 8 | 5 | 0 | 0 | 0 | 49 | 8 |
| Western Sydney Wanderers | 2015–16 | A-League | 28 | 4 | 1 | 0 | 0 | 0 | 29 | 4 |
| Liaoning Whowin | 2016 | Chinese Super League | 13 | 2 | 0 | 0 | 0 | 0 | 13 | 2 |
| Career total | | | 216 | 39 | 12 | 2 | 9 | 0 | 237 | 41 |

=== International ===
International goals
| No. | Date | Venue | Opponent | Score | Result | Competition |
|---|---|---|---|---|---|---|
| 1 | 24 May 2010 | Melbourne Cricket Ground, Melbourne, Australia | New Zealand | 1–1 | 2–1 | Friendly |
| 2 | 15 October 2013 | Craven Cottage, London, England | Canada | 0–2 | 0–3 | Friendly |

== Managerial statistics ==
As of match played 31 May 2026

Managerial record by team and tenure
| Team | From | To | Record | | | | | | | |
| Team | From | To | G | W | D | L | GF | GA | GD | Win % |
|---|---|---|---|---|---|---|---|---|---|---|
| Melbourne City | 24 November 2022 | 9 July 2024 | 42 | 22 | 8 | 12 | 78 | 52 | +26 | 52.38 |
| Brighton & Hove Albion Women | 10 July 2024 | 28 August 2026 | 58 | 23 | 10 | 25 | 91 | 89 | +2 | 39.66 |
| Career total | | | 100 | 45 | 18 | 37 | 169 | 141 | +28 | 45.00 |

== Honours ==
=== Player ===
FC Sion

- Swiss Cup: 2014–15

=== Manager ===
Individual

- Women's Super League Manager of the Month: October 2024
