= Chad Gibson =

Australian soccer player (born 1976)

Personal information
- Full name: Chad Gibson
- Date of birth: 19 June 1976 (age 50)
- Place of birth: Sydney, Australia
- Height: 1.85 m (6 ft 1 in)
- Position: Defender

Team information
- Current team: AJFC

Youth career
- Sydney Croatia

Senior career*
Years	Team	Apps	(Gls)
1992–1993	St George Saints	2	(0)
1994–1997	Sydney United	14	(1)
1997–2004	Marconi Stallions	126	(12)
1999	AC United	?	(?)
2001	Bodø/Glimt	7	(0)
2004	Stanmore Hawks	17	(4)
2004–2005	Bankstown City Lions	?	(?)
2005–2007	Brisbane Roar	23	(0)
2007	Blacktown City Demons	0	(0)
2008	Stanmore Hawks		
2009	Lokomotiv Cove		
- * Club domestic league appearances and goals as of 16 June 2007

Chad Gibson (born 19 June 1976) is a former professional footballer.

== Biography ==
Chad Gibson is from Sydney, Australia, with parents of South African origin who migrated to Australia during Apartheid due to racial policies, which legally forbade their relationship. Gibson is an ex-professional footballer who is a versatile player having played professionally from defence to the mid-field. He began his professional career with Sydney United, who played in the now defunct National Soccer League. After moving to Marconi Stallions, he played a season for Johor FC in Malaysia and another season with FK Bodø/Glimt in Norway, before returning to Australia to play for Marconi Stallions. He joined the Queensland Roar as the club's first ever captain, and a face of the A-League, appearing heavily in the A-League advertisement campaign. In 2006, Gibson retired from professional football after two seasons of the A-League and a career that spanned over 12 years and over 200 professional games.

The former A-League Captain continued to play for one season in the division below the A-League, where he won the NSW Premier League Championship in 2007 with Blacktown City Demons where he scored the match winning goal in his final official game. In 2008 he joined NSW State League Division 1 side, Stanmore Hawks. He returned to playing park football with various clubs and later signed on for Joeys FC United in the New England Mutual Premier League in a mentoring role to the young team, as a way to support and give back to rural Australian football. Gibson now plays again for his first ever junior club, Belmore Eagles, alongside his father on the pitch].

Gibson is currently a Creative Director and Sports Photographer.

== Honours ==
With Stanmore Hawks

- (Australia) NSW Super League Championship: 2004

With Blacktown City Demons

- (Australia) NSW Premier League Championship: 2007
- (Australia) NSW Premier League Premiership: 2007
