= David Dodd (soccer) =

Australian footballer

Personal information
- Full name: David Dodd
- Date of birth: 1 February 1985 (age 41)
- Place of birth: Southport, Australia
- Height: 1.85 m (6 ft 1 in)
- Position: Central midfielder

Youth career
- Palm Beach
- 2000–2002: QAS

Senior career*
Years	Team	Apps	(Gls)
2005–2007	Lancaster City		
2007	Palm Beach		
2008–2010	Brisbane Roar	23	(1)
2010–2011	Manly United	15	(2)
2011–2013	Edgeworth Eagles	36	(4)
2014	Murwillumbah	11	(1)
- * Club domestic league appearances and goals as of 27 September 2013 ‡ National team caps and goals as of 3 December 2007

David Dodd (born 1 February 1985 in Southport, Queensland, Australia) is an Australian footballer who plays for Edgeworth Eagles in the NBN State Football League. He had previously played for Brisbane Roar. His brother Karl Dodd has also played in the A-League for various clubs including Brisbane Roar and Wellington Phoenix.

== A-League statistics ==
Club	Season	League^{1}		Cup		International^{2}		Total	
Club	Season	Apps	Goals	Apps	Goals	Apps	Goals	Apps	Goals
Brisbane Roar	2008–09	8	0	0	0	0	0	8	0
Brisbane Roar	2009–10	15	1	0	0	0	0	15	1
Total		23	1					23	1

^{1} – includes A-League final series statistics
^{2} – includes FIFA Club World Cup statistics; AFC Champions League statistics are included in season commencing after group stages (i.e. ACL and A-League seasons etc.)
