= Ben Griffin (soccer) =

Australian soccer player

Personal information
- Full name: Ben Phillip Griffin
- Date of birth: 7 March 1986 (age 40)
- Place of birth: Brisbane, Australia
- Height: 1.86 m (6 ft 1 in)
- Position: Centre back

Team information
- Current team: Whittlesea Zebras

Youth career
- The Gap
- Albany Creek
- 2001: QAS

Senior career*
Years	Team	Apps	(Gls)
2004	Queensland Lions		
2006	Souths United		
2006–2009	Brisbane Roar	26	(1)
2010–2011	Brisbane Strikers FC		
????–????	The Gap		
2017	Pine Hills	2	(0)

International career
2003	Australia U-17	11	(0)
2004	Australia U-20	2	(0)
2007	Australia U-23	3	(0)
- * Club domestic league appearances and goals as of 17 February 2009

Ben Griffin (born 7 March 1986 in Brisbane, Queensland) is an Australian footballer who plays as a central defender. He went to school at Marist College Ashgrove in Brisbane. A talented junior he represented Australia at the under 17, under 21 and under 23 levels. From 2006 to 2009 Ben played for the Queensland Roar (now known as Brisbane Roar) in the A-League. After time away from the game he signed for Pine Hills in the Brisbane Capital League 2 for the 2017 season "wanting to help out with the younger talent".

== A-League statistics ==
Club	Season	League^{1}		Cup		International^{2}		Total	
Club	Season	Apps	Goals	Apps	Goals	Apps	Goals	Apps	Goals
Brisbane Roar	2005–06	0	0	0	0	0	0	0	0
Brisbane Roar	2006–07	9	1	0	0	0	0	9	1
Brisbane Roar	2007–08	12	0	0	0	0	0	12	0
Brisbane Roar	2008–09	5	0	0	0	0	0	5	0
Total		26	1					26	1

^{1} - includes A-League final series statistics
^{2} - includes FIFA Club World Cup statistics; AFC Champions League statistics are included in season commencing after group stages (i.e. ACL and A-League seasons etc.)
