= Tim Smits =

Australian soccer player

Personal information
- Full name: Timothy Smits
- Date of birth: 11 April 1986 (age 40)
- Place of birth: Brisbane, Australia
- Height: 1.82 m (6 ft 0 in)
- Position: Forward

Team information
- Current team: Grange Thistle

Youth career
- North Pine SC
- Albany Creek
- 2000–2003: QAS

Senior career*
Years	Team	Apps	(Gls)
2003–2005	Pine Rivers United		
2005–2006	Rochedale Rovers		
2006–2007	Queensland Roar	0	(0)
2007–2008	Rochedale Rovers		
2008–2010	Brisbane Roar	14	(0)
2012	Rochedale Rovers		
2013–2015	Olympic FC	67	(54)
2017–	Grange Thistle	19	(4)

International career^{‡}
- Australia U-17
- * Club domestic league appearances and goals as of 4 October 2017 ‡ National team caps and goals as of 20 August 2011

Tim Smits (born 11 April 1986) is an Australian footballer who plays for Grange Thistle.

== Club career ==
Smits began his career with North Pine SC, he then moved to Albany Creek and then to the QAS. At the Queensland Academy of Sport he spent three years, after this, he joined Pine Rivers United where he played two years. In January 2006, Smits was scouted by Netherlands club Helmond Sport, where he played for the reserve team, after one year in the Netherlands, he moved back to Australia and signed with Rochedale Rovers. In January 2008, after playing nine games in one year for Rochedale, he joined A-League club Brisbane Roar.

== A-League statistics ==
Club	Season	League^{1}		Cup		International^{2}		Total	
Club	Season	Apps	Goals	Apps	Goals	Apps	Goals	Apps	Goals
Brisbane Roar	2008–09	9	0	0	0	0	0	9	0
Total		9	0					9	0

^{1} - includes A-League final series statistics
^{2} - includes FIFA Club World Cup statistics; AFC Champions League statistics are included in season commencing after group stages (i.e. ACL and A-League seasons etc.)
