= 2005–06 Adelaide United FC season =

Adelaide United
2005–06 season
- Manager: John Kosmina
- Stadium: Hindmarsh Stadium, Adelaide
- A-League: 1st
- A-League Finals: Preliminary Final
- Pre-Season Challenge Cup: Group Stage
- Top goalscorer: League: Carl Veart (7); All: Carl Veart (7)
- Highest home attendance: 15,104 vs. Sydney FC (12 February 2006)
- Lowest home attendance: 5,263 vs. Perth Glory (22 July 2005)
- Average home league attendance: 10,947

The 2005–06 Adelaide United FC season was the club's second season since its establishment in 2003. The club participated in the A-League for the first time after the National Soccer League was replaced.

Continuing their good form from the final season of the NSL, Adelaide United finished as Premiers in the inaugural season of the Hyundai A-League.

The Reds were bundled out of the finals race in straight sets losing to Sydney FC in the two leg semi final and then Central Coast Mariners 1–0 in the preliminary final at Hindmarsh.

== Players ==
Note: Flags indicate national team as defined under FIFA eligibility rules; some limited exceptions apply. Players may hold more than one non-FIFA nationality.

No.	Pos.	Nation	Player
1	GK	AUS	Daniel Beltrame
2	DF	AUS	Richie Alagich
3	DF	AUS	Kristian Rees
4	DF	AUS	Angelo Costanzo
5	DF	AUS	Michael Valkanis
6	MF	AUS	Ross Aloisi
7	MF	AUS	Lucas Pantelis
8	FW	AUS	Carl Veart
9	MF	AUS	Matthew Kemp

No.	Pos.	Nation	Player
10	FW	BRA	Fernando
11	MF	AUS	Louis Brain
12	FW	AUS	Chad Bugeja
13	MF	AUS	Travis Dodd
15	FW	AUS	Michael Matricciani
17	DF	AUS	Adam van Dommele
20	GK	AUS	Robert Bajic
21	MF	AUS	Jason Spagnuolo

== Transfers ==
=== Transfers in ===
No.	Position	Player	Transferred from	Type/fee	Contract length	Date	Ref
2	DF	Richie Alagich	Unattached	Undisclosed	3 years	1 July 2005	
1	GK	Daniel Beltrame	(Australia) Parramatta Power	Undisclosed	4 years	1 July 2005	
18	DF	Robert Cornthwaite	Unattached	Undisclosed	6 years	1 July 2005	
4	DF	Angelo Costanzo	(Australia) Campbelltown City	Undisclosed	4 years	1 July 2005	
10	MF	(Brazil) Fernando	(Brazil) Villa Rio	Undisclosed	2 years	1 July 2005	
16	MF	Tony Hatzis	(Australia) North Eastern MetroStars	Free	1 year	1 July 2005	
21	MF	Jason Spagnuolo	(New Zealand) Metro AFC	Undisclosed	3 years	1 January 2006	
14	DF	Aaron Goulding	Unattached	Undisclosed	1 year	1 January 2006	
3	DF	Kristian Rees	Unattached	Undisclosed	1 year	1 January 2006	

=== Transfers out ===
No.	Position	Player	Transferred to	Type/fee	Date	Ref
—	FW	Aurelio Vidmar	Retired		1 July 2005	
16	MF	Tony Hatzis	(Australia) North Eastern MetroStars	Free	1 February 2006	

=== Loans out ===
No.	Position	Player	Transferred to	Date	Ref
19	FW	(China) Shengqing Qu	(China) Shanghai Greenland Shenhua	1 December 2005	

== Squad statistics ==
=== Appearances and goals ===
No.	Pos.	Name	A-League		Pre-Season Challenge Cup		OFC Club Championship		Total	
No.	Pos.	Name	Apps	Goals	Apps	Goals	Apps	Goals	Apps	Goals
1	GK	(Australia) Daniel Beltrame	14	0	3	0	2	0	19	0
2	DF	(Australia) Richie Alagich	18+5	0	3	0	2	0	28	0
3	DF	(Australia) Kristian Rees	15+7	1	3	0	0	0	25	1
4	DF	(Australia) Angelo Costanzo	24	0	3	0	2	0	29	0
5	DF	(Australia) Michael Valkanis	24	3	3	2	2	0	29	5
6	MF	(Australia) Ross Aloisi	23	2	3	1	2	0	29	3
7	MF	(Australia) Lucas Pantelis	13+4	1	1	0	0+2	0	20	1
8	FW	(Australia) Carl Veart	23	7	3	0	2	0	28	7
9	DF	(Australia) Matthew Kemp	11+2	0	2+1	0	2	0	18	0
10	FW	(Brazil) Fernando	17+1	7	0	0	0	0	18	7
11	MF	(Australia) Louis Brain	6+11	3	0	0	0+2	0	19	3
12	FW	(Australia) Chad Bugeja	1+8	0	0+3	0	0+1	0	13	0
13	MF	(Australia) Travis Dodd	20+3	3	3	0	2	0	28	4
14	DF	(Australia) Aaron Goulding	7+2	0	0+2	0	2	0	13	0
15	FW	(Australia) Michael Matricciani	0+3	0	0	0	0	0	3	0
17	DF	(Australia) Adam van Dommele	19	0	3	1	2	0	24	1
18	DF	(Australia) Robert Cornthwaite	2+9	0	0	0	0	0	11	0
20	GK	(Australia) Robert Bajic	10+1	0	0	0	0	0	11	0
21	MF	(Australia) Jason Spagnuolo	0+1	0	0	0	0	0	1	0
Players sold but featured this season
10	MF	(Australia) Aurelio Vidmar	0	0	2	0	0	0	2	0
16	MF	(Australia) Tony Hatzis	0+1	0	0	0	0	0	1	0
19	FW	(China) Shengqing Qu	17+2	7	1+2	0	2	0	24	7

=== Disciplinary record ===
Rank	Position	Name	A-League		Pre-Season Challenge Cup		OFC Club Championship		Total	
Rank	Position	Name	Booked	Sent off (straight red)	Booked	Sent off (straight red)	Booked	Sent off (straight red)	Booked	Sent off (straight red)
1	DF	(Australia) Richie Alagich	1	1	0	0	1	0	1	1
2	GK	(Australia) Daniel Beltrame	0	1	0	0	0	0	0	1
3	MF	(Australia) Ross Aloisi	8	0	0	0	1	0	9	0
4	DF	(Australia) Adam van Dommele	6	0	0	0	1	0	7	0
4	FW	(Australia) Carl Veart	5	0	1	0	1	0	7	0
6	DF	(Australia) Kristian Rees	5	0	1	0	0	0	6	0
7	DF	(Australia) Angelo Costanzo	3	0	0	0	2	0	5	0
7	FW	(China) Shengqing Qu	5	0	0	0	0	0	5	0
9	MF	(Australia) Travis Dodd	4	0	0	0	0	0	4	0
9	DF	(Australia) Michael Valkanis	3	0	1	0	0	0	4	0
11	DF	(Australia) Matthew Kemp	2	0	1	0	0	0	3	0
12	MF	(Australia) Lucas Pantelis	2	0	0	0	0	0	2	0
13	MF	(Australia) Louis Brain	1	0	0	0	0	0	1	0
13	FW	(Brazil) Fernando	1	0	0	0	0	0	1	0
13	DF	(Australia) Aaron Goulding	1	0	0	0	0	0	1	0
13	FW	(Australia) Michael Matricciani	1	0	0	0	0	0	1	0

== Pre-season ==
=== Friendlies ===
19 February 2005	Northern Demons (Australia)	0–9	(Australia) Adelaide United	Port Pirie, Australia
				Stadium: Bryne Park

20 February 2005	Port Pirie City (Australia)	0–8	(Australia) Adelaide United	Port Pirie, Australia
				Stadium: Savoy Park

25 February 2005	Adelaide United (Australia)	1–1	(Australia) Premier's XI	Adelaide, Australia
				Stadium: Hindmarsh Stadium

27 February 2005	Para Hills Knights (Australia)	0–4	(Australia) Adelaide United	Adelaide, Australia
				Stadium: The Paddocks

15 March 2005	White City Woodville (Australia)	0–4	(Australia) Adelaide United	Adelaide, Australia
				Stadium: Woodville West Reserve

22 March 2005	Cumberland United (Australia)	1–9	(Australia) Adelaide United	Adelaide, Australia
				Stadium: A.A. Bailey Reserve

5 April 2005	Adelaide Raiders (Australia)	1–2	(Australia) Adelaide United	Adelaide, Australia
				Stadium: Croatian Sports Centre

12 April 2005	Adelaide Blue Eagles (Australia)	0–4	(Australia) Adelaide United	Adelaide, Australia
				Stadium: Marden Sports Complex

19 April 2005	Campbelltown City (Australia)	0–3	(Australia) Adelaide United	Adelaide, Australia
				Stadium: Newton Sports Ground

22 April 2005	Adelaide Galaxy (Australia)	0–9	(Australia) Adelaide United	Adelaide, Australia
				Stadium: Camden Sports Complex

30 April 2005	Adelaide United (Australia)	2–0	Australia U-20	Adelaide, Australia
				Stadium: Hindmarsh Stadium

5 July 2005	North Eastern MetroStars (Australia)	0–4	(Australia) Adelaide United	Adelaide, Australia
				Stadium: T.K. Shutter Reserve

26 June 2005	Melbourne Victory (Australia)	0–0	(Australia) Adelaide United	Bendigo, Australia
17:00 UTC+10

12 July 2005	Newcastle Jets (Australia)	2–0	(Australia) Adelaide United	Coffs Harbour, Australia
17:00 UTC+10

14 July 2005	Adelaide United (Australia)	1–0	(Australia) Queensland Roar	Coffs Harbour, Australia
17:00 UTC+10

=== Pre-Season Challenge Cup ===
Pos	Team	Pld	W	D	L	GF	GA	GD	Pts
1	(Victoria (state)) Melbourne Victory	3	1	2	0	2	1	+1	5
2	(Western Australia) Perth Glory	3	1	1	1	4	4	0	4
3	(South Australia) Adelaide United	3	0	3	0	3	3	0	3
4	(New South Wales) Newcastle Jets	3	0	2	1	3	4	−1	2

22 July 2005 Group Stage	Adelaide United (South Australia)	2–2	(Western Australia) Perth Glory	Hindmarsh Stadium, Adelaide
17:00 UTC+10	Aloisi 54'; Valkanis 62'		Valkanis 29' (o.g.); Despotovski 52'	Attendance: 5,263; Referee: Craig Zetter

29 July 2005 Group Stage	Adelaide United (South Australia)	1–1	(New South Wales) Newcastle Jets	Hindmarsh Stadium, Adelaide
17:00 UTC+10	Valkanis 74'		Johnson 79'	Attendance: 6,750; Referee: Simon Przydacz

8 August 2005 Group Stage	Melbourne Victory (Victoria (state))	0–0	(South Australia) Adelaide United	Olympic Park Stadium, Melbourne
17:00 UTC+10				Attendance: 4,687; Referee: Perry Mur

== Competitions ==
=== A-League ===
==== League table ====
Pos	Team	Pld	W	D	L	GF	GA	GD	Pts	Qualification
1	Adelaide United	21	13	4	4	33	25	+8	43	Qualification for 2007 AFC Champions League group stage and Finals series
2	Sydney FC (C)	21	10	6	5	35	28	+7	36	Qualification for 2007 AFC Champions League group stage and Finals series
3	Central Coast Mariners	21	8	8	5	35	28	+7	32	Qualification for Finals series
4	Newcastle Jets	21	9	4	8	27	29	−2	31	Qualification for Finals series
5	Perth Glory	21	8	5	8	34	29	+5	29	
6	Queensland Roar	21	7	7	7	27	22	+5	28	
7	Melbourne Victory	21	7	5	9	26	24	+2	26	
8	New Zealand Knights (Note: New Zealand Knights cannot qualify for the AFC Champions League as they are not recognised as an AFC club.)	21	1	3	17	15	47	−32	6	

Source: ultimatealeague.com
Rules for classification: 1) points; 2) goal difference; 3) number of goals scored.
(C) Champions

==== Matches ====
26 August 2005 1	Newcastle Jets	0–1	Adelaide United	EnergyAustralia Stadium
20:00 UTC+10		Report; Summary	Veart 19'	Attendance: 13,160; Referee: Peter O'Leary

2 September 2005 2	Adelaide United	0–0	Queensland Roar	Hindmarsh Stadium
19:30 UTC+9:30		Report; Summary		Attendance: 11,029; Referee: Ben Williams

9 September 2005 3	Adelaide United	1–0	Melbourne Victory	Hindmarsh Stadium
19:30 UTC+9:30	Brain 1'	Report; Summary		Attendance: 8,785; Referee: Peter O'Leary

17 September 2005 4	Perth Glory	1–2	Adelaide United	Members Equity Stadium
19:35 UTC+8	Valkanis 20' (o.g.)	Report; Summary	Aloisi 32'; Qu 65'	Attendance: 8,052; Referee: Matthew Breeze

25 September 2005 5	Adelaide United	1–1	Central Coast Mariners	Hindmarsh Stadium
17:00 UTC+9:30	Valkanis 34'	Report; Summary	Kwasnik 19'	Attendance: 7,013; Referee: Angelo Nardi

2 October 2005 6	New Zealand Knights	1–2	Adelaide United	North Harbour Stadium
18:00 UTC+12	Yeo 44'	Report; Summary	Dodd 34'; Qu 81'	Attendance: 3,558; Referee: Peter O'Leary

9 October 2005 7	Sydney FC	2–1	Adelaide United	Aussie Stadium
17:00 UTC+10	Carney 54'; Petrovski 88'	Report; Summary	Valkanis 51'	Attendance: 18,276; Referee: Mark Shield

14 October 2005 8	Adelaide United	2–4	Newcastle Jets	Hindmarsh Stadium
19:30 UTC+9:30	Valkanis 38'; Corbo 67' (o.g.)	Report; Summary	Kemp 12' (o.g.); Carle 22', 89'; Zelic 68'	Attendance: 13,182; Referee: Mark Shield

22 October 2005 9	Queensland Roar	1–2	Adelaide United	Suncorp Stadium
19:30 UTC+10	Brownlie 76'	Report; Summary	Fernando 59'; Pantelis 89'	Attendance: 15,181; Referee: Peter O'Leary

28 October 2005 10	Melbourne Victory	0–1	Adelaide United	Olympic Park Stadium
20:00 UTC+10		Report; Summary	Veart 83'	Attendance: 16,201; Referee: Matthew Breeze

6 November 2005 11	Adelaide United	2–4	Perth Glory	Hindmarsh Stadium
16:30 UTC+10:30	Veart 13' (pen.); Rees 53'	Report; Summary	Mori 9', 34', 45+1'; Despotovski 39' (pen.)	Attendance: 10,868; Referee: Ben Williams

13 November 2005 12	Central Coast Mariners	1–2	Adelaide United	Bluetongue Stadium
	Hutchinson 12'		Rech 90'; Dodd 85'	Attendance: 5,467; Referee: Peter O'Leary

20 November 2005 13	Adelaide United	1–0	New Zealand Knights	Hindmarsh Stadium
	Qu 38'			Attendance: 9,676; Referee: Angelo Nardi

27 November 2005 14	Adelaide United	3–2	Sydney FC	Hindmarsh Stadium
	Rech 4', 84'; Veart 14'		Miura 33', 76'	Attendance: 14,068; Referee: Mark Shield

2 December 2005 15	Newcastle Jets	1–2	Adelaide United	EnergyAustralia Stadium
	Johnson 59'		Brain 79'; Veart 75'	Attendance: 10,132; Referee: Simon Przydacz

1 January 2006 16	Adelaide United	4–2	Queensland Roar	Hindmarsh Stadium
	Rech 40', 63'; Qu 30'; Veart 29'		Baird 83'; Brosque 11'	Attendance: 8,426; Referee: Matthew Breeze

5 January 2006 17	Adelaide United	1–0	Melbourne Victory	Hindmarsh Stadium
	Dodd 14'			Attendance: 13,427; Referee: Mark Shield

12 January 2006 18	Perth Glory	1–2	Adelaide United	Members Equity Stadium
	Ward 86'		Aloisi 71'; Qu 3'	Attendance: 5,033; Referee: Matthew Breeze

20 January 2006 19	Adelaide United	1–1	Central Coast Mariners	Hindmarsh Stadium
	Veart 50' (pen.)		Kwasnik 54'	Attendance: 13,008; Referee: Mark Shield

28 January 2006 20	New Zealand Knights	1–1	Adelaide United	North Harbour Stadium
	Zhang 71'		Brain 21'	Attendance: 3,079; Referee: Perry Mur

3 February 2006 21	Sydney FC	2–1	Adelaide United	Aussie Stadium
	Ceccoli 71'; Yorke 48' (pen.)		Qu 90'	Attendance: 25,557; Referee: Mark Shield

==== Finals Series ====
12 February 2006 Semi-Final Leg 1	Adelaide United	2–2	Sydney FC	Hindmarsh Stadium
	Rech 34'; Dodd 31'		Petrovski 39'; Corica 9'	Attendance: 15,104; Referee: Matthew Breeze

19 February 2006 Semi-Final Leg 2	Sydney FC	2–1	Adelaide United	Aussie Stadium
	Rudan 76'; Petrovski 29'		Qu 60'	Attendance: 30,377; Referee: Mark Shield

26 February 2006 Preliminary Final	Adelaide United	0–1	Central Coast Mariners	Hindmarsh Stadium
			Pondeljak 7'	Attendance: 11,405; Referee: Matthew Breeze

=== OFC Club Championship ===
==== Qualification zone ====
7 May 2005	Adelaide United	0–0 (4–1 p)	Melbourne Victory
				Attendance: 7,254

11 May 2005	Central Coast Mariners	4–0	Adelaide United
	Mrdja 20' (pen.), 43', 65'; Petrie 24'			Attendance: 4,539

== Awards ==
Award	Player
Club Champion	(Australia) Carl Veart
Player's Player	(Australia) Michael Valkanis
Top Goalscorer	(Australia) Carl Veart
Best Team Man	(Australia) Matthew Kemp
Rising Star	(Australia) Adam van Dommele
