= 2005–06 Newcastle Jets FC season =

Newcastle United Jets FC
2005–06 season
- Owner: Con Constantine
- Manager: Richard Money
- A-League: 4th
- Top goalscorer: Ante Milicic - 7
- Highest home attendance: 13,160 v Adelaide United; 26 August 2005
- Lowest home attendance: 5,868 v Perth Glory; 8 October 2005

The 2005–06 A-League season was the first for the newly branded Newcastle United Jets. The Jets finished 4th at the conclusion of the regular season and were knocked out in the semi-finals by Adelaide United after a two-leg home and away series.

== Players ==
=== First team squad ===
Note: Flags indicate national team as defined under FIFA eligibility rules; some limited exceptions apply. Players may hold more than one non-FIFA nationality.

No.	Pos.	Nation	Player
1	GK	AUS	Liam Reddy
2	DF	AUS	Steve Eagleton
3	DF	AUS	Jade North
4	DF	AUS	Craig Deans
5	DF	AUS	Ned Zelic (captain)
6	DF	AUS	Andrew Durante
7	MF	AUS	Richard Johnson
8	MF	AUS	Matt Thompson
9	FW	AUS	Ante Milicic
10	MF	AUS	Nick Carle
11	FW	ENG	Guy Bates
12	DF	AUS	Paul Kohler
13	DF	URU	Mateo Corbo

No.	Pos.	Nation	Player
14	MF	AUS	Jobe Wheelhouse
15	MF	AUS	Stuart Musialik
16	FW	ALB	Labinot Haliti
17	FW	AUS	Franco Parisi
18	DF	AUS	Brett Studman
19	FW	AUS	Mark Bridge
20	GK	AUS	Andy Petterson
21	MF	AUS	Tarek Elrich
22	DF	AUS	Allan Picken
23	FW	AUS	James Monie
24	MF	AUS	Peter McPherson
25	FW	NZL	Vaughan Coveny

=== Transfers ===
==== In ====
Name	Position	From	Fee (A$)
(Australia) Liam Reddy	Goalkeeper	(Australia) Sydney United	Free
(Australia) Steve Eagleton	Defender	(Australia) Newcastle Breakers	Free
(Australia) Jade North	Defender	(Australia) Perth Glory FC	Free
(Australia) Craig Deans	Defender	(Australia) Perth Glory FC	Free
(Australia) Ned Zelic	Defender	(Austria) FC Wacker Tirol	Free
(Australia) Andrew Durante	Defender	(Singapore) Balestier Khalsa FC	Free
(Australia) Richard Johnson	Midfield	(England) Queens Park Rangers	Free
(Australia) Matt Thompson	Midfield	(Australia) Marconi Stallions	Free
(Australia) Ante Milicic	Forward	(Malaysia) Pahang FA	Free
(Australia) Nick Carle	Midfield	(Australia) Marconi Stallions	Free
(Australia) Tarek Elrich	Midfield	(Australia) Sydney Olympic	Free
(England) Guy Bates	Forward	(England) Newcastle United	Free
(Uruguay) Mateo Corbo	Defender	(England) Oxford United	Free
(Australia) Jobe Wheelhouse	Midfield	Unsigned	N/A
(Australia) Stuart Musialik	Midfield	Unsigned	N/A
(Albania) Labinot Haliti	Forward	(Australia) Sydney United	Free
(Australia) Franco Parisi	Forward	(Australia) Sydney United	Free
(Australia) Brett Studman	Defender	Unknown	N/A
(Australia) Mark Bridge	Forward	(Australia) Parramatta Power	Free
(Australia) Andy Petterson	Goalkeeper	(Republic of Ireland) Derry City	Free
(Australia) Allan Picken	Defender	Unknown	N/A
(Australia) James Monie	Forward	Unknown	N/A
(Australia) Paul Kohler	Defender	(Australia) Cringila Lions	Free
(Australia) Peter McPherson	Midfield	Unknown	N/A
(New Zealand) Vaughan Coveny	Forward	(Australia) South Melbourne (loan)	Free

== Matches ==
=== 2005–06 Pre-Season Cup ===
Team	Pts	Pld	W	D	L	GF	GA
Melbourne Victory	5	3	1	2	0	2	1
Perth Glory	4	3	1	1	1	4	4
Adelaide United	3	3	0	3	0	3	3
Newcastle United Jets	2	3	0	2	1	3	4

22 July 2005	Newcastle Jets	1–1	Melbourne Victory	EnergyAustralia Stadium, Newcastle
20:00 UTC+10	Deans 28'	Report	Thompson 85'

29 July 2005	Adelaide United	1–1	Newcastle Jets	Hindmarsh Stadium, Adelaide
14:00 UTC+9:30	Valkanis 74'	Report	Johnson 79'

6 August 2005	Perth Glory	2–1	Newcastle Jets	Members Equity Stadium, Perth
19:30 UTC+9:30	Despotovski 12', 61' (pen.)	Report	Thompson 29'

=== 2005–06 Hyundai A-League fixtures ===
26 August 2005 Round 1	Newcastle Jets	0–1	Adelaide United	EnergyAustralia Stadium, Newcastle
20:00 UTC+10		Report; Summary	Veart 19'	Attendance: 13,160; Referee: Peter O'Leary

4 September 2005 Round 2	Central Coast Mariners	1–1	Newcastle Jets	Bluetongue Stadium, Gosford
15:00 UTC+10	Petrie 69'	Report; Summary	Milicic 25'	Attendance: 5,917; Referee: Mark Shield

11 September 2005 Round 3	Newcastle Jets	2–1	Sydney FC	EnergyAustralia Stadium, Newcastle
17:00 UTC+10	Milicic 6'; Johnson 18'	Report; Summary	Yorke 78'	Attendance: 9,127; Referee: Matthew Breeze

18 September 2005 Round 4	Newcastle Jets	4–0	New Zealand Knights	EnergyAustralia Stadium, Newcastle
17:00 UTC+10	Haliti 12'; Thompson 26'; Musialik 37'; Carle 70' (pen.)	Report; Summary		Attendance: 7,495; Referee: Simon Przydacz

25 September 2005 Round 5	Melbourne Victory	1–0	Newcastle Jets	Olympic Park Stadium, Melbourne
17:00 UTC+10	Thompson 68'	Report; Summary		Attendance: 13,831; Referee: Craig Zetter

1 October 2005 Round 6	Newcastle Jets	0–1	Queensland Roar	EnergyAustralia Stadium, Newcastle
19:35 UTC+10		Report; Summary	Moon 68'	Attendance: 7,436; Referee: Srebre Delovski

8 October 2005 Round 7	Newcastle Jets	1–5	Perth Glory	EnergyAustralia Stadium, Newcastle
19:30 UTC+10	Parisi 72'	Report; Summary	Mori 33', 62'; Harnwell 46'; Despotovski 52'; Sekulovski 80'	Attendance: 5,868; Referee: James Lewis

14 October 2005 Round 8	Adelaide United	2–4	Newcastle Jets	Hindmarsh Stadium, Adelaide
19:30 UTC+9:30	Valkanis 38'; Corbo 67' (own)	Report; Summary	Kemp 12' (own); Carle 22', 89'; Zelic 68'	Attendance: 13,182; Referee: Mark Shield

23 October 2005 Round 9	Newcastle Jets	1–0	Central Coast Mariners	EnergyAustralia Stadium, Newcastle
17:00 UTC+10	Parisi 88'	Report; Summary		Attendance: 9,371; Referee: Matthew Breeze

30 October 2005 Round 10	Sydney FC	1–1	Newcastle Jets	Sydney Football Stadium, Sydney
17:00 UTC+10	Carney 73'	Report; Summary	Milicic 77'	Attendance: 9,132; Referee: Mark Shield

4 November 2005 Round 11	New Zealand Knights	2–4	Newcastle Jets	North Harbour Stadium. Auckland
20:00 UTC+13	Brockie 71', 77'	Report; Summary	Milicic 18', 28', 56'; Thompson 21'	Attendance: 2,561; Referee: Matthew Breeze

11 November 2005 Round 12	Melbourne Victory	0–0	Newcastle Jets	Olympic Park Stadium, Melbourne
20:00 UTC+11		Report; Summary		Attendance: 12,407; Referee: Simon Przydacz

20 November 2005 Round 13	Queensland Roar	0–1	Newcastle Jets	Suncorp Stadium, Brisbane
18:00 UTC+10		Report; Summary	Thompson 35'	Attendance: 13,004; Referee: Mark Shield

25 November 2005 Round 14	Perth Glory	0–1	Newcastle Jets	Members Equity Stadium, Perth
19:00 UTC+9		Report; Summary	Coveny 47'	Attendance: 7,921; Referee: Simon Przydacz

2 December 2005 Round 15	Newcastle Jets	1–2	Adelaide United	EnergyAustralia Stadium, Newcastle
20:00 UTC+11	Johnson 60'	Report; Summary	Veart 76'; Brain 79'	Attendance: 10,132; Referee: Simon Przydacz

31 December 2005 Round 16	Central Coast Mariners	4–1	Newcastle Jets	Bluetongue Stadium, Gosford
18:00 UTC+11	Gumprecht 4'; Brown 34'; Hutchinson 71', 82'	Report; Summary	Coveny 85'	Attendance: 11,612; Referee: Mark Shield

6 January 2006 Round 17	Sydney FC	0–0	Newcastle Jets	Sydney Football Stadium, Sydney
20:00 UTC+11		Report; Summary		Attendance: 15,211; Referee: Matthew Breeze

13 January 2006 Round 18	Newcastle Jets	3–0	New Zealand Knights	EnergyAustralia Stadium, Newcastle
20:00 UTC+11	Milicic 19'; Haliti 86', 90+1'	Report; Summary		Attendance: 6,862; Referee: Perry Mur

22 January 2006 Round 19	Newcastle Jets	1–0	Melbourne Victory	EnergyAustralia Stadium, Newcastle
17:00 UTC+11	Coveny 36'	Report; Summary		Attendance: 9,073; Referee: Matthew Breeze

26 January 2006 Round 20	Newcastle Jets	0–5	Queensland Roar	EnergyAustralia Stadium, Newcastle
20:00 UTC+11		Report; Summary	Reinaldo 10'; Richter 44'; Brosque 52'; McKay 83'; Murdocca 90+2'	Attendance: 10,271; Referee: Peter O'Leary

5 February 2006 Round 21	Newcastle Jets	1–3	Perth Glory	EnergyAustralia Stadium, Newcastle
17:00 UTC+11	Coveny 33'	Report; Summary	Ward 8'; Picken 58' (own); Mori 72'	Attendance: 9,232; Referee: Matthew Breeze

=== 2005–06 finals series ===
10 February 2006 Minor Semi-final Leg 1	Newcastle Jets	0–1	Central Coast Mariners	EnergyAustralia Stadium, Newcastle
20:00 UTC+10		Report; Summary	Osman 75'	Attendance: 10,236; Referee: Ben Williams

10 February 2006 Minor Semi-final Leg 2	Central Coast Mariners	1–1	Newcastle Jets	Bluetongue Stadium, Gosford
20:00 UTC+10	Heffernan 79'	Report; Summary	Thompson 28'	Attendance: 17,429; Referee: Simon Przydacz

=== Ladder ===
Pos	Team	Pld	W	D	L	GF	GA	GD	Pts	Qualification
1	Adelaide United	21	13	4	4	33	25	+8	43	Qualification for 2007 AFC Champions League group stage and Finals series
2	Sydney FC (C)	21	10	6	5	35	28	+7	36	Qualification for 2007 AFC Champions League group stage and Finals series
3	Central Coast Mariners	21	8	8	5	35	28	+7	32	Qualification for Finals series
4	Newcastle Jets	21	9	4	8	27	29	−2	31	Qualification for Finals series
5	Perth Glory	21	8	5	8	34	29	+5	29	
6	Queensland Roar	21	7	7	7	27	22	+5	28	
7	Melbourne Victory	21	7	5	9	26	24	+2	26	
8	New Zealand Knights (Note: New Zealand Knights cannot qualify for the AFC Champions League as they are not recognised as an AFC club.)	21	1	3	17	15	47	−32	6	

Source: ultimatealeague.com
Rules for classification: 1) points; 2) goal difference; 3) number of goals scored.
(C) Champions

== Statistics ==
=== Goal scorers ===
Name	Pre-Season	A-League	Finals
(Australia) Ante Milicic	0	7	0
(New Zealand) Vaughan Coveny	0	4	0
(Australia) Matt Thompson	1	3	1
(Albania) Labinot Haliti	0	3	0
(Australia) Nick Carle	0	3	0
(Australia) Richard Johnson	1	2	0
(Australia) Franco Parisi	0	2	0
(Australia) Stuart Musialik	0	1	0
(Australia) Ned Zelic	0	1	0
(Australia) Craig Deans	1	0	0
