= List of Newcastle Jets FC seasons =

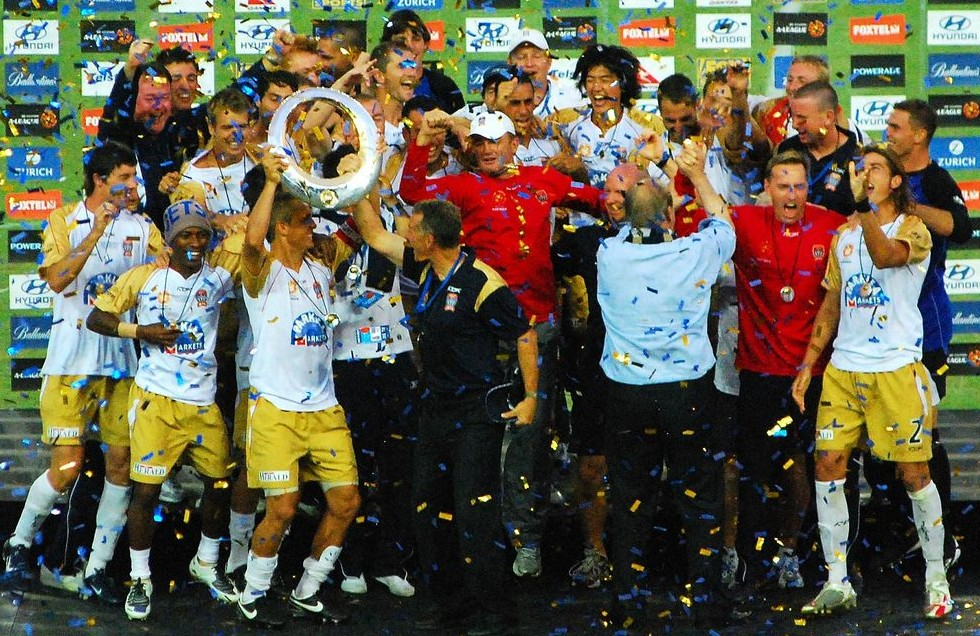
Newcastle Jets celebrating after their 2008 Grand Final victory

Newcastle Jets Football Club is an Australian professional association football club based in Waratah West, Newcastle. The club was formed 2000 as Newcastle United Jets. They became one of the three members from the New South Wales admitted into the A-League, having spent their first four seasons participating in the National Soccer League.

== Key ==
Key to league competitions:

- A-League – Australia's top soccer league, established in 2005
- NSL – The first tier of Australian football until the inception of the A-League in 2005.

Key to colours and symbols:

1st or W	Winners
2nd or RU	Runners-up
3rd	Third
♦	Top scorer in division
↑	Promoted
↓	Relegated

Key to league record:

- Season = The year and article of the season
- Pos = Final position
- Pld = Games played
- W = Games won
- D = Games drawn
- L = Games lost
- GF = Goals scored
- GA = Goals against
- Pts = Points

Key to cup record:

- En-dash (–) = Newcastle Jets did not participate
- R32 = Round of 32
- R16 = Round of 16
- QF = Quarter-finals
- SF = Semi-finals
- RU = Runners-up
- W = Winners

== Seasons ==
Results of league and cup competitions by season
Season	Division	P	W	D	L	F	A	Pts	Pos	Finals	Pre-Season Cup (2005–08) Australia Cup (2014–present)	Competition	Result	Name	Goals
Season	League									Finals	Pre-Season Cup (2005–08) Australia Cup (2014–present)	Other / Asia		Top goalscorer	
2000–01	NSL	30	7	9	14	37	56	30	14th	—	—	—	—	John Buonavoglia	7
2001–02	NSL	24	10	12	2	33	21	42	2nd	PF	—	—	—	Joel Griffiths; Alex Moreira	10
2002–03	NSL	24	10	7	7	37	25	37	4th	6th	—	—	—	Joel Griffiths	14
2003–04	NSL	24	6	6	12	18	33	24	11th	—	—	—	—	Jobe Wheelhouse	4
2005–06	A-League	21	9	4	8	27	29	31	4th	SF	Group	—	—	Ante Milicic	7
2006–07	A-League	21	8	6	7	32	30	30	3rd	PF	4th	—	—	Mark Bridge	8
2007–08	A-League	21	9	7	5	25	21	34	2nd	W	5th	—	—	Joel Griffiths	14
2008–09	A-League	21	4	6	11	21	39	18	8th	—	Group	Champions League	R16	Joel Griffiths	7
2009–10	A-League	27	10	4	13	33	45	34	6th	SF	—	—	—	Michael Bridges, Matt Thompson	6
2010–11	A-League	30	9	8	13	29	33	35	7th	—	—	—	—	Sasho Petrovski	5
2011–12	A-League	27	9	10	8	35	34	37	7th	—	—	—	—	Jeremy Brockie, Ryan Griffiths	9
2012–13	A-League	27	8	7	12	30	45	31	8th	—	—	—	—	Emile Heskey; Ryan Griffiths	9
2013–14	A-League	27	10	8	9	45	36	38	7th	—	—	—	—	Adam Taggart	16 ♦
2014–15	A-League	27	3	8	16	23	55	17	10th	—	R32	—	—	Edson Montaño	6
2015–16	A-League	27	8	6	13	28	41	30	8th	—	R32	—	—	Miloš Trifunović	9
2016–17	A-League	27	5	7	15	28	53	22	10th	—	R32	—	—	Andrew Nabbout	8
2017–18	A-League	27	15	5	7	57	37	50	2nd	RU	R32	—	—	Andrew Nabbout; Dimitri Petratos	10
2018–19	A-League	27	10	5	12	40	36	35	7th	—	R16	Champions League	Play-off	Roy O'Donovan	12
2019–20	A-League	26	9	7	10	32	40	34	8th	—	QF	—	—	Dimitri Petratos	7
2020–21	A-League	26	5	6	15	24	38	21	11th	—	—	—	—	Roy O'Donovan	7
2021–22	A-League Men	26	8	5	13	45	43	29	9th	—	PR	—	—	Beka Mikeltadze	13
2022–23	A-League Men	26	8	5	13	30	45	29	10th	—	R32	—	—	Beka Mikeltadze	6

== See also ==
- Australian clubs in the AFC Champions League
