= 2003–04 Newcastle United FC (Australia) season =

Newcastle United
2003-2004 season
- Manager: Ian Crook
- National Soccer League: 11th

The 2003–04 Newcastle United season was the final season of the National Soccer League. Newcastle finished 11th on the table, failing to qualify for the NSL finals.

== First-team squad ==
Squad at end of season

Note: Flags indicate national team as defined under FIFA eligibility rules; some limited exceptions apply. Players may hold more than one non-FIFA nationality.

No.	Pos.	Nation	Player
—	GK	AUS	John Perosh
—	GK	AUS	Tom Willis
—	DF	AUS	Milan Blagojevic
—	DF	AUS	Nigel Boogaard
—	DF	AUS	Craig Deans
—	DF	AUS	Steve Eagleton
—	DF	AUS	Adam Griffiths
—	DF	AUS	Robbie Middleby
—	DF	AUS	Josh Mitchell
—	DF	AUS	Peter Tsekenis
—	DF	AUS	Scott Thomas
—	DF	AUS	Keegen Wolfenden
—	DF	AUS	Mark Wilson

No.	Pos.	Nation	Player
—	MF	AUS	Damien Brown
—	MF	AUS	Mitchell Johnson
—	MF	AUS	Thomas Libbesson
—	MF	AUS	Peter McPherson
—	MF	AUS	Stuart Musialik
—	MF	AUS	Greg Owens
—	MF	AUS	Mitchell Prentice
—	MF	AUS	Joel Thiessen
—	MF	AUS	Mitchell Wallace
—	MF	AUS	Jobe Wheelhouse
—	FW	AUS	Jason Cowburn
—	FW	AUS	Ryan Griffiths
—	FW	FIJ	Esala Masi

== Results ==
=== National Soccer League ===
20 September 2003	Football Kingz	1–2	Newcastle United	Ericsson Stadium
	Ngata 74'	Report	Masi 19'; Wheelhouse 29'	Attendance: 2,304; Referee: D. Rugg

26 September 2003	Newcastle United	2–1	Northern Spirit	Energy Australia Stadium
	Wheelhouse 2' (pen.), pen.'	Report	Macallister 28'	Attendance: 4,673; Referee: James Lewis

4 October 2003	Marconi Stallions	1–1	Newcastle United	Marconi Stadium
	Renaud (red card) 72'; Costanzo 92'	Report	Middleby 54'; Thomas (red card) 72'	Attendance: 2,068; Referee: Eddie Lennie

10 October 2003	Newcastle United	1–1	Parramatta Power	Energy Australia Stadium
	Ceccoli 28' (o.g.)	Report	Dodd 45'	Attendance: 3,501; Referee: Matthew Breeze

19 October 2003	South Melbourne	4–1	Newcastle United	Bob Jane Stadium
	Coveny 24' (pen.), 39', 76'; Perosh 56' (o.g.)	Report	Owens 30'	Attendance: 3,750; Referee: D. Rugg

24 October 2003	Newcastle United	2–3	Adelaide United	Energy Australia Stadium
	Owens 16'; R. Griffiths 61'	Report	Veart 64' (pen.), 78'; Vidmar 73'	Attendance: 3,005; Referee: C. Diomis

1 November 2003	Brisbane Strikers	2–1	Newcastle United	Perry Park
	Morley 36'; Brownlie 45'	Report	Tsekenis 90'	Attendance: 2,715; Referee: J. Lewis

14 November 2003	Newcastle United	0–0	Sydney United	Energy Australia Stadium
		Report		Attendance: 3,672; Referee: P. Mur

21 November 2003	Newcastle United	0–1	Sydney Olympic	Energy Australia Stadium
			Caravella 84'	Attendance: 1,651; Referee: C. Zetter

28 November 2003	Newcastle United	1–0	Perth Glory	Energy Australia Stadium
	Masi 82'	Report		Attendance: 2,976; Referee: S. Micallef

7 December 2003	Melbourne Knights	1–1	Newcastle United	Knights Stadium
	Razov 49'		R. Griffiths 58'	Attendance: 2,673; Referee: E. Lennie

17 October 2003	Newcastle United	2–0	Wollongong Wolves	Energy Australia Stadium
	R. Griffiths 6'; Libbesson 91'	Report		Attendance: 3,513; Referee: S. Przydacz

12 December 2003	Newcastle United	2–0	Football Kingz	Energy Australia Stadium
	Johnson 34'; Deans 55'	Report		Attendance: 1,433; Referee: B. Williams

21 December 2003	Northern Spirit	1–1	Newcastle United	Pittwater Park
	Thomas 62' (o.g.)	Report	Masi 34'	Attendance: 1,935; Referee: E. Lennie

28 December 2003	Newcastle United	0–1	Marconi Stallions	Energy Australia Stadium
		Report	Maloney 29'	Attendance: 3,084; Referee: B. Hugo

2 January 2004	Parramatta Power	4–0	Newcastle United	Parramatta Stadium
	Dodd 57'; Petrovski 62', 84'; Milicic 71'			Attendance: 2,736; Referee: B. Williams

19 December 2003	Newcastle United	0–1	South Melbourne	Energy Australia Stadium
			Crucija 7'	Attendance: 1,231; Referee: P. Green

11 January 2004	Adelaide United	0–0	Newcastle United	Hindmarsh Stadium
				Attendance: 14,280; Referee: P. Green

16 January 2004	Newcastle United	1–0	Brisbane Strikers	Energy Australia Stadium
	Wheelhouse 20'			Attendance: 2,181; Referee: P. Green

1 February 2004	Sydney United	2–0	Newcastle United	Sydney United Sports Centre
	B. Santalab 22'; Austin 40'			Attendance: 2,276; Referee: P. Mur

8 February 2004	Sydney Olympic	2–0	Newcastle United	OKI Jubilee Stadium
	Cardozo 72', 79'			Attendance: 2,685; Referee: D. Rugg

14 February 2004	Perth Glory	2–0	Newcastle United	Members Equity Stadium
	Mori 27'; Caceres 85'			Attendance: 8,678; Referee: C. Zetter

20 February 2004	Newcastle United	0–2	Melbourne Knights	Energy Australia Stadium
			Pelikan 64', 75' (pen.)	Attendance: 3,263; Referee: J. Lewis

29 February 2004	Wollongong Wolves	3–0	Newcastle United	WIN Stadium
	Nwaogazi 10'; Young 19'; Sabljak 83'			Attendance: 3,531; Referee: P. Green

== Final standings ==
Pos	Team	Pld	W	D	L	GF	GA	GD	Pts	Qualification
1	Perth Glory (C)	24	18	3	3	56	22	+34	57	Qualification to Finals series
2	Parramatta Power	24	16	3	5	58	30	+28	51	Qualification to Finals series
3	Adelaide United	24	11	7	6	28	25	+3	40	Qualification to Finals series
4	Marconi Stallions	24	10	8	6	29	25	+4	38	Qualification to Finals series
5	South Melbourne	24	11	4	9	39	21	+18	37	Qualification to Finals series
6	Brisbane Strikers	24	9	5	10	28	33	−5	32	Qualification to Finals series
7	Northern Spirit	24	9	3	12	31	33	−2	30	
8	Sydney Olympic	24	7	8	9	26	31	−5	29	
9	Wollongong Wolves	24	8	5	11	34	41	−7	29	
10	Sydney United	24	7	8	9	18	25	−7	29	
11	Newcastle United	24	6	6	12	18	33	−15	24	
12	Melbourne Knights	24	6	5	13	21	41	−20	23	
13	Football Kingz	24	4	3	17	25	51	−26	15	

Source: ozfootball.net
Rules for classification: 1) Points; 2) Goal difference; 3) Goals scored;
(C) Champions
