= 2006–07 Newcastle Jets FC season =

Newcastle United Jets FC
2006-07 season
- Owner: Con Constantine
- Manager: Gary van Egmond
- Top goalscorer: Mark Bridge - 8
- Highest home attendance: 24,338 v Sydney FC; 2 February 2007
- Lowest home attendance: 4,635 v Melbourne Victory; 8 October 2006

The 2006-07 season was Newcastle Jets' second season in the Hyundai A-League. After a poor start to the season, The Jets finished strongly to place 3rd at the conclusion of the regular season. They beat Sydney FC in the minor Semi-Final but lost to Adelaide United in the Preliminary Final on penalties.

== Players ==
=== First team squad ===
Note: Flags indicate national team as defined under FIFA eligibility rules; some limited exceptions apply. Players may hold more than one non-FIFA nationality.

No.	Pos.	Nation	Player
1	GK	AUS	Ivan Necevski
2	DF	AUS	Steve Eagleton
3	DF	AUS	Jade North
4	DF	AUS	Craig Deans
5	FW	COL	Milton Rodriguez
6	DF	AUS	Andrew Durante
7	MF	AUS	Tony Faria
8	MF	AUS	Matt Thompson
9	FW	NZL	Vaughan Coveny
10	MF	AUS	Nick Carle
11	MF	AUS	Tarek Elrich
12	MF	AUS	Paul Okon (captain)
13	MF	AUS	Adam D'Apuzzo
14	MF	AUS	Jobe Wheelhouse

No.	Pos.	Nation	Player
15	MF	AUS	Stuart Musialik
16	FW	ALB	Labinot Haliti
17	FW	AUS	Tolgay Özbey
18	FW	AUS	Joel Griffiths
19	FW	AUS	Mark Bridge
20	GK	AUS	Ben Kennedy
21	MF	AUS	Troy Hearfield
22	DF	NZL	Steven Old
23	DF	AUS	Shane Webb
24	MF	AUS	Paul Kohler
25	MF	NZL	Tim Brown
30	GK	AUS	Tando Velaphi
40	GK	AUS	Ante Covic

=== Transfers ===
==== In ====
Name	Position	From	Fee (A$)
(Australia) Adam D'Apuzzo	Midfield	(Australia) Marconi Stallions	Free
(Australia) Tony Faria	Midfield	(Australia) Marconi Stallions	Free
(Australia) Ben Kennedy	Goalkeeper	(Australia) Broadmeadow Magic FC	Free
(Colombia) Milton Rodriguez	Forward	(South Korea) Jeonbuk Hyundai Motors	Free
(Australia) Paul Okon	Defender	(Cyprus) APOEL FC	Free
(New Zealand) Steven Old	Midfield	(New Zealand) YoungHeart Manawatu	Free
(Australia) Tolgay Özbey	Forward	(Australia) Blacktown City	Free
(Australia) Joel Griffiths	Forward	(England) Leeds United	Free
(Australia) Ivan Necevski	Goalkeeper	(Australia) Blacktown City	Free
(Australia) Troy Hearfield	Forward	Unsigned	N/A
(Australia) Tim Brown	Midfield	(United States) Richmond Kickers	Free
(Australia) Shane Webb	Defender	Unknown	N/A
(Australia) Tando Velaphi	Goalkeeper	(Australia) Perth SC	Loan
(Australia) Ante Čović	Goalkeeper	(Sweden) Hammarby	Free

==== Out ====
Name	Position	To	Fee (A$)
(Uruguay) Mateo Corbo	Defender	(Spain) Hércules CF	Free
(Australia) Richard Johnson	Midfield	New Zealand Knights	Free
(Australia) Franco Parisi	Forward	New Zealand Knights	Free
(Australia) Brett Studman	Defender	(Australia) Bankstown City Lions	Free
(Australia) Ante Milicic	Forward	(Australia) Queensland Roar	Free
(Australia) Andy Petterson	Goalkeeper	(Australia) ECU Joondalup	Free
(Australia) Liam Reddy	Goalkeeper	(Australia) Queensland Roar	Free
(Australia) Ned Zelic	Defender	(Netherlands) Helmond Sport	Free
(Australia) Allan Picken	Defender	(England) Walsall	$50,000
(Australia) Guy Bates	Forward	(England) Darlington	Free
(Australia) James Monie	Midfield	(Australia) Manly United	Free
(Australia) Peter McPherson	Midfield	(Australia) Sydney Olympic	Free

== Matches ==
=== 2006-07 Pre-Season Cup ===
Pos	Team	Pld	W	D	L	GF	GA	BP	Pts	Qualification
1	Sydney FC	4	3	1	0	7	2	2	12	Advance to semi-finals
2	Newcastle Jets FC	4	0	2	2	4	6	1	3	Advance to semi-finals
3	New Zealand Knights	4	0	3	1	2	3	0	3	
4	Queensland Roar	4	0	3	1	2	3	0	3	

Head-to-head results: Queensland Roar 1–1 New Zealand Knights (tied on head-to-head results, ranked on disciplinary record).

16 July 2006 Group Stage	New Zealand Knights	1 : 1	Newcastle Jets	North Harbour Stadium, Auckland
14:00 UTC+12	Richter 39'	Report	Bridge 57'	Attendance: 804; Referee: Neil Fox

22 July 2006 Group Stage	Sydney FC	2 : 1	Newcastle Jets	Canberra Stadium, Canberra
14:00 UTC+10	Topor-Stanley 3'; Middleby 25'	Report	McFlynn 68' (own)	Attendance: 7,226; Referee: Ben Williams

29 July 2006 Group Stage	Newcastle Jets	0 : 0	Queensland Roar	Port Macquarie Regional Stadium, Port Macquarie
18:30 UTC+10		Report		Attendance: 2,822

5 August 2006 Bonus Round	Newcastle Jets	2 : 3	Melbourne Victory	Scully Park Oval, Tamworth
18:00 UTC+10	North 17'; Carle 70' (pen)	Report	Thompson 44'; Muscat 62' (pen); Allsop 84'	Attendance: 3,100

12 August 2006 Playoffs	Central Coast Mariners	2 : 1 (a.e.t.)	Newcastle Jets	Bluetongue Stadium, Gosford
18:00 UTC+10	Petrie 52' (pen); O'Grady 96'	Report	Coveny 25'	Attendance: 7,567; Referee: Ben Williams

19 August 2006 Third Place Playoff	Sydney FC	2 : 0	Newcastle Jets	Campbelltown Stadium, Campbelltown
19:30 UTC+10	Petrovski 40'; Rudan 68'	Report		Attendance: 5,326

=== 2006-07 Hyundai A-League fixtures ===
27 August 2006 Round 1	New Zealand Knights	0 : 0	Newcastle Jets	North Harbour Stadium, Auckland
17:00 UTC+12		Report; Summary		Attendance: 7,304; Referee: Simon Przydacz

1 September 2006 Round 2	Newcastle Jets	2 : 3	Queensland Roar	EnergyAustralia Stadium, Newcastle
20:00 UTC+10	Gibson 26' (own); Bridge 40'	Report; Summary	Reinaldo 5'; Okon 38' (own); Lynch 88'	Attendance: 7,276; Referee: Angelo Nardi

8 September 2006 Round 3	Adelaide United	5 : 1	Newcastle Jets	Hindmarsh Stadium, Adelaide
19:30 UTC+9:30	Fernando 8', 72'; Cornthwaite 19'; Qu 28'; Durante 65' (own)	Report; Summary	Bridge 52'	Attendance: 8,785; Referee: Mark Shield

17 September 2006 Round 4	Sydney FC	2 : 2	Newcastle Jets	Sydney Football Stadium, Sydney
20:00 UTC+10	Corica 33' (pen); Zdrilić 38'	Report; Summary	Rodriguez 45+1', 62'	Attendance: 15,488; Referee: Matthew Breeze

23 September 2006 Round 5	Central Coast Mariners	1 : 1	Newcastle Jets	Bluetongue Stadium, Gosford
19:00 UTC+10	Hutchinson 12'	Report; Summary	Griffiths 82'	Attendance: 8,439; Referee: Simon Przydacz

29 September 2006 Round 6	Newcastle Jets	0 : 3	Perth Glory	EnergyAustralia Stadium, Newcastle
20:00 UTC+10		Report; Summary	Young 44', 92'; Harnwell 83'	Attendance: 7,961; Referee: Matthew Breeze

8 October 2006 Round 7	Newcastle Jets	0 : 2	Melbourne Victory	EnergyAustralia Stadium, Newcastle
20:00 UTC+10		Report; Summary	Allsopp 69', 90'	Attendance: 4,635; Referee: Peter Green

14 October 2006 Round 8	Newcastle Jets	3 : 0	New Zealand Knights	EnergyAustralia Stadium, Newcastle
19:00 UTC+10	North 72'; Musialik 86'; Rodriguez 93'	Report; Summary		Attendance: 5,725; Referee: Peter Green

22 October 2006 Round 9	Queensland Roar	0 : 1	Newcastle Jets	Suncorp Stadium, Brisbane
17:00 UTC+10		Report; Summary	Coveny 35'	Attendance: 16,061; Referee: Peter O'Leary

27 October 2006 Round 10	Newcastle Jets	2 : 1	Adelaide United	EnergyAustralia Stadium, Newcastle
20:00 UTC+10	Coveny 26'; Carle 89'	Report; Summary	Veart 37' (pen)	Attendance: 10,895; Referee: Matthew Breeze

4 November 2006 Round 11	Newcastle Jets	1 : 1	Sydney FC	EnergyAustralia Stadium, Newcastle
19:00 UTC+11	Brown 86'	Report; Summary	Zdrilić 14'	Attendance: 8,493; Referee: Mark Shield

12 November 2006 Round 12	Newcastle Jets	3 : 1	Central Coast Mariners	EnergyAustralia Stadium, Newcastle
17:00 UTC+11	Bridge 6'; Carle 17'; Rodriguez 79'	Report; Summary	Mori 40'	Attendance: 14,026; Referee: Matthew Breeze

18 November 2006 Round 13	Perth Glory	2 : 1	Newcastle Jets	Members Equity Stadium, Perth
17:00 UTC+9	Harnwell 38'; Glavas 90+4'	Report; Summary	Carle 77' (pen)	Attendance: 7,315; Referee: Angelo Nardi

26 November 2006 Round 14	Melbourne Victory	0 : 1	Newcastle Jets	Telstra Dome, Melbourne
17:00 UTC+11		Report; Summary	Rodriguez 61'	Attendance: 27,753; Referee: Matthew Breeze

3 December 2006 Round 15	New Zealand Knights	1 : 1	Newcastle Jets	North Harbour Stadium, Auckland
17:00 UTC+13	Marcina 29' (pen)	Report; Summary	Griffiths 13'	Attendance: 2,039; Referee: Peter O'Leary

7 December 2006 Round 16	Queensland Roar	0 : 3	Newcastle Jets	Suncorp Stadium, Brisbane
19:00 UTC+10		Report; Summary	Bridge 9', 77'; Griffiths 53'	Attendance: 10,040; Referee: Matthew Breeze

15 December 2006 Round 17	Adelaide United	3 : 2	Newcastle Jets	Hindmarsh Stadium, Adelaide
19:30 UTC+10:30	Romário 15'; Fernando 60'; Owens 78'	Report; Summary	Bridge 59'; Thompson 67'	Attendance: 12,214; Referee: Mark Shield

1 January 2007 Round 18	Newcastle Jets	0 : 2	Sydney FC	EnergyAustralia Stadium, Newcastle
18:00 UTC+11		Report; Summary	Brosque 45+1'; Petrovski 90+1'	Attendance: 20,980; Referee: Matthew Breeze

5 January 2007 Round 19	Newcastle Jets	1 : 0	Central Coast Mariners	EnergyAustralia Stadium, Newcastle
20:00 UTC+11	Rodriguez 25'	Report; Summary		Attendance: 14,828; Referee: Mark Shield

14 January 2007 Round 20	Perth Glory	3 : 3	Newcastle Jets	Members Equity Stadium, Perth
18:00 UTC+9	Colosimo 43' (pen); Harnwell 78'; Magdic 81'	Report; Summary	Carle 12'; Griffiths 90+1', 90+4'	Attendance: 7,904; Referee: Simon Przydacz

19 January 2007 Round 21	Newcastle Jets	4 : 0	Melbourne Victory	EnergyAustralia Stadium, Newcastle, Newcastle
20:00 UTC+11	Bridge 36', 48'; Coveny 51'; Griffiths 73'	Report; Summary		Attendance: 19,601; Referee: Matthew Breeze

=== 2006-07 Finals series ===
26 January 2007 Minor Semi-Final Leg 1	Sydney FC	2 : 1	Newcastle Jets	Sydney Football Stadium, Sydney
20:00 UTC+11	Brosque 15'; Milligan 30'	Report; Summary	Rodriguez 71'	Attendance: 21,122; Referee: Peter Green

2 February 2007 Minor Semi-Final Leg 2	Newcastle Jets	2 : 0	Sydney FC	EnergyAustralia Stadium, Newcastle
20:00 UTC+11	Griffiths 57'; Coveny 71'	Report; Summary		Attendance: 24,338; Referee: Matthew Breeze

11 February 2007 Preliminary final	Adelaide United	1 : 1 (a.e.t.) (4 : 3 p)	Newcastle Jets	Hindmarsh Stadium, Adelaide
17:30 UTC+10:30	Veart 57'	Report; Summary	Coveny 74'	Attendance: 13,798; Referee: Matthew Breeze
	Penalties
	Diego (penalty scored); Owens (penalty scored); Alagich (penalty scored); Aloisi (penalty scored)		(penalty scored) Bridge; (penalty scored) Carle; (penalty scored) Thompson; (penalty missed) Coveny; (penalty missed) Musialik

=== Points table ===
Pos	Team	Pld	W	D	L	GF	GA	GD	Pts	Qualification
1	Melbourne Victory (C)	21	14	3	4	41	20	+21	45	Qualification for 2008 AFC Champions League group stage and Finals series
2	Adelaide United	21	10	3	8	32	27	+5	33	Qualification for 2008 AFC Champions League group stage and Finals series
3	Newcastle Jets	21	8	6	7	32	30	+2	30	Qualification for Finals series
4	Sydney FC	21	8	8	5	29	19	+10	29 (Note: Sydney FC were penalised three competition points following round 18 due to salary cap breaches which occurred during the 2005–06 season)	Qualification for Finals series
5	Queensland Roar	21	8	5	8	25	27	−2	29	
6	Central Coast Mariners	21	6	6	9	22	26	−4	24	
7	Perth Glory	21	5	5	11	24	30	−6	20	
8	New Zealand Knights (Note: New Zealand Knights cannot qualify for the AFC Champions League as they are not recognised as an AFC club.)	21	5	4	12	13	39	−26	19	Disbanded at end of season

Source: ultimatealeague.com
Rules for classification: 1) points; 2) goal difference; 3) number of goals scored.
(C) Champions

== Statistics ==
=== Goal scorers ===
Name	Pre-Season	A-League	Finals
(Australia) Mark Bridge	1	8	0
(Colombia) Milton Rodriguez	0	6	1
(Australia) Joel Griffiths	0	6	1
(Australia) Nick Carle	1	4	0
(New Zealand) Vaughan Coveny	1	3	2
(Australia) Jade North	1	1	0
(Australia) Stuart Musialik	0	1	0
(Australia) Tim Brown	0	1	0
(Australia) Matt Thompson	0	1	0
