= Michael Valkanis =

Australian soccer player and manager

Personal information
- Full name: Mihalis Valkanis
- Date of birth: 23 August 1974 (age 52)
- Place of birth: Melbourne, Australia
- Height: 1.81 m (5 ft 11 in)
- Position: Centre back

Team information
- Current team: Brisbane Roar (head coach)

Youth career
- South Melbourne

Senior career*
Years	Team	Apps	(Gls)
1993–1996	South Melbourne	50	(0)
1996	Iraklis	6	(0)
1996–2001	AEL	102	(3)
2001–2002	Agios Nikolaos	4	(0)
2002–2003	Adelaide City	29	(3)
2003–2009	Adelaide United	77	(4)
2004	→ Adelaide Olympic (loan)	11	(0)
Total		279	(10)

International career^{‡}
1994–1995	Australia U23	5	(1)
2006	Australia	1	(0)

Managerial career
- 2013: Adelaide United (caretaker)
- 2013: Enfield City
- 2017: Melbourne City
- 2022: Eupen
- 2023: Hapoel Tel Aviv
- 2024: Adana Demirspor
- 2025–: Brisbane Roar
- * Club domestic league appearances and goals as of 23 December 2008 ‡ National team caps and goals as of 16 March 2008

Mihalis "Michael" Valkanis (Greek: Μιχάλης "Μάικλ" Βαλκάνης, pronounced [miˈxalis valˈkanis]; born 23 August 1974) is an Australian association football coach and former player who is the current head coach of Brisbane Roar in the A-League.

== Club career ==
=== South Melbourne Hellas ===
Valkanis began his career at South Melbourne at age six and rose through the ranks as a talented junior at South Melbourne to the senior team.

At South Melbourne, Valkanis made 50 league appearances for his boyhood club. His performances in defence for the club earned him a regular position for the Australia under 23 side and attracting the attention of overseas clubs.

Valkanis would later state in an interview with Four Four Two that pulling on the South Melbourne kit for his debut was the proudest moment of his footballing career.

=== Iraklis ===
Valkanis then played in the Greek League with Iraklis and most notably with AEL where he played for five seasons and won 102 caps, and Agios Nikolaos. He played 110 games in the now-defunct National Soccer League, scoring four goals with South Melbourne, Adelaide City and Adelaide United.

In mid-2007, Valkanis was named captain of his club side, Adelaide United, replacing Angelo Costanzo (who had been appointed as interim captain after the resignation and departure of Ross Aloisi).

Valkanis announced his intention to retire at the end of the 2008-09 A-League season in December 2008. The former captain and 100 game veteran was given a testimonial match against Newcastle Jets on 9 January 2009 where he replaced Daniel Mullen in the second half and saw Adelaide through to a 2–0 win.

== International career ==
Valkanis' international debut, and only game for Australia, was for the Socceroos in an Asian Cup qualifier versus Kuwait at Sydney Football Stadium on 16 August 2006. At the time of his debut he was the second oldest debutant for Australia, behind Tommy Stankovic who debuted as a 33 year old in a friendly game against FC Torpedo Moscow. Danny Vukovic's debut later pushed Valkanis down to 3rd place on the oldest debutant list.

== Managerial career ==
After the resignation of Adelaide United manager John Kosmina on 28 January 2013, Valkanis was appointed caretaker manager of Adelaide United for the remainder of the A-League season. Under Valkanis, Adelaide United managed to finish the A-League season in fourth place, therefore qualifying for the A-League finals. However, they were eliminated in the first round by Brisbane Roar.

In May 2016, Valkanis left Adelaide United.

In June 2016, Valkanis joined Melbourne City as the senior assistant coach to John van 't Schip.

On 3 January 2017, after the resignation of Melbourne City manager John van't Schip, Valkanis was appointed manager of the club for the remainder of the season.

On May 9, 2018, Dutch Eredivisie club PEC Zwolle announced Valkanis had been appointed assistant to manager John van't Schip on a one-year deal with a one-year option.

On November 1, 2023, Ajax announced Valkanis had been appointed assistant to manager John van't Schip on a one-year deal with a one-year option.

On July 8, 2024, Adana Demirspor announced Valkanis had been appointed as manager on a one-year deal with a one-year option. He was able to get 1 point in the first 6 weeks of the season with the narrow squad. On September 23, 2024, the club announced that they parted ways with Valkanis.

After more than 7 years working in Europe, Valkanis returned to Australia to take over as head coach of Brisbane Roar for the 2025–26 A-League season.

== Personal life ==
Valkanis is of Greek descent. He attended De La Salle College, Malvern. His family has hails from Giannitsa.

== Career statistics ==
(Correct as of 16 January 2009)

Club	Season	League^{1}		Cup		International^{2}		Total	
Club	Season	Apps	Goals	Apps	Goals	Apps	Goals	Apps	Goals
Adelaide United	2005–06	24	3	3	2	0	0	27	5
Adelaide United	2006–07	23	0	6	0	0	0	29	0
Adelaide United	2007–08	3	0	2	0	6	0	11	0
Adelaide United	2008–09	3	0	2	0	2	0	7	0
Total								74	5

^{1} – includes A-League final series statistics
^{2} – includes FIFA Club World Cup statistics; AFC Champions League statistics are included in season commencing after group stages (i.e. 2008 ACL in 2008–09 A-League season etc.)

== Managerial statistics ==
As of 3 January 2026

Team	Nat	From	To	Record				
Team	Nat	From	To	G	W	D	L	Win %
Adelaide United (caretaker)	(Australia)	28 January 2013	7 April 2013	10	2	3	5	20.00
Melbourne City	(Australia)	3 January 2017	30 June 2017	15	6	1	8	40.00
Eupen	(Belgium)	16 February 2022	30 June 2022	8	1	2	5	12.50
Hapoel Tel Aviv	(Israel)	1 July 2023	29 October 2023	5	2	2	1	40.00
AFC Ajax (caretaker)	(Netherlands)	22 December 2023	22 December 2023	2	0	1	1	0.00
Adana Demirspor	(Turkey)	9 July 2024	23 September 2024	6	0	1	5	0.00
Brisbane Roar FC	(Australia)	7 May 2025	present	11	5	3	3	45.45
Total				57	16	13	28	28.07

== Honours ==
=== With South Melbourne Hellas ===
- National Soccer League Premiership: 1992–93
- National Soccer League Cup: 1995–96
- Dockerty Cup: 1993, 1995

With Adelaide United:

- (Australia) A-League Premiership: 2005–2006

Personal honours:

- Adelaide United Player's Player of the Year: 2005–2006
