= Jade North =

Australian soccer player (born 1982)

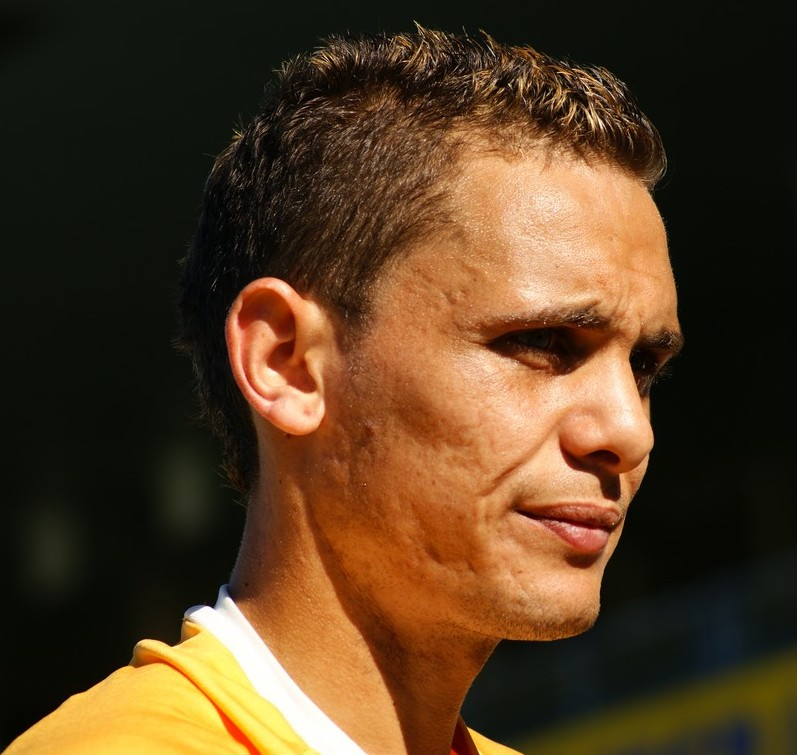
- North in 2008

Personal information
- Full name: Jade Bronson North
- Date of birth: 7 January 1982 (age 44)
- Place of birth: Taree, New South Wales, Australia
- Height: 1.80 m (5 ft 11 in)
- Positions: Centre back; right back

Youth career
- 1998: QAS
- 1999: AIS

Senior career*
Years	Team	Apps	(Gls)
1998–2001	Brisbane Strikers	48	(3)
2001–2003	Sydney Olympic	59	(3)
2003–2004	Perth Glory	22	(0)
2005–2009	Newcastle Jets	80	(2)
2009	Incheon United	9	(0)
2010	Tromsø	14	(0)
2010	Tromsø IL 2	1	(0)
2010–2011	Wellington Phoenix	19	(0)
2011	FC Tokyo	4	(0)
2012	Consadole Sapporo	23	(0)
2013–2018	Brisbane Roar	115	(4)
2019	Murray United	12	(0)
2020	Eastern Suburbs	14	(0)
2023	Brisbane Strikers	9	(0)

International career^{‡}
1998–1999	Australia U-17	19	(4)
2001	Australia U-20	6	(1)
2004	Australia U-23	12	(1)
2008	Australia Olympic (O.P.)	3	(0)
2002–2013	Australia	41	(0)

Managerial career
- 2023: Brisbane Strikers
Medal record
Men's football
Representing Australia
FIFA U-17 World Championship
Runner-up	1999 New Zealand
AFC Asian Cup
Runner-up	2011 Qatar
OFC Nations Cup
Winner	2004 Australia
Runner-up	2002 New Zealand
OFC U-19 Men's Championship
Winner	2001 Cook Islands/New Caledonia
- * Club domestic league appearances and goals as of 13 May 2023 ‡ National team caps and goals as of 25 July 2013

Jade Bronson North (born 7 January 1982) is an Australian former professional soccer player who played as a centre back or right back. He was a member of the Australian national team, and is as of November 2021 co-chair of Football Australia's inaugural National Indigenous Advisory Group.

== Early life ==
Jade Bronson North was born in Taree, of Biripi descent. He lived in New Zealand until the age of 11, then moved back to Australia, taking up residence in the suburb of Sunnybank in Brisbane, with his brother Brook North and parents. He attended Sunnybank High School until he was offered a place with the AIS in Canberra at the age of 15.

== Club career ==
North joined the Brisbane Strikers as one of the youngest players to join the National Soccer League and then later moving to the Perth Glory.

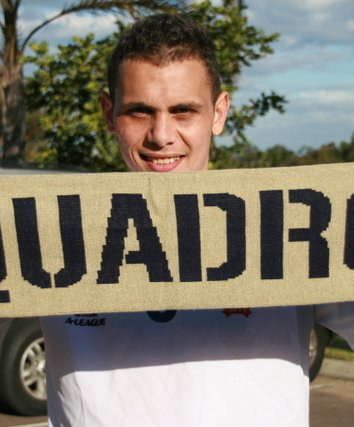
North with the Newcastle Jets in 2007.

He was named as the captain of the Newcastle Jets for the 2007–08 A-League season following the departure of Paul Okon.

On 9 June 2008, Australian newspapers suggested that North was due to sign with Belgian club, Club Brugge, or with Armenian club Mika F.C. However any rumours of offers proved to purely speculative, with North admitting no concrete offers had materialised.

On 3 November 2008, he was announced as the inaugural North Queensland Fury marquee player for the 2009–10 A-League season, however, after a week of rumours surrounding North's future, on 12 December 2008 it was publicised that North Queensland Fury would be releasing him from contract as he signed with South Korean K-League club Incheon United on a rumoured $2 million contract.

North trialled with Swedish side Trelleborg but on 26 February 2010, Norwegian side Tromsø IL signed the Australian defender from Incheon United. He spent four months in Norway before joining Wellington Phoenix on 30 July 2010 on a one-year deal.

On 2 April 2011, he moved from Wellington to Japanese second-tier club FC Tokyo.

On 8 January 2013, he signed a three-and-a-half-year deal to play with Brisbane Roar in the A-League, leaving after five years in April 2018.

On 15 May 2019, North signed for National Premier League Victoria 2 side Murray United for the remainder of the season.

On 7 January 2023, North's 41st birthday, Brisbane Strikers announced a return to the club for the upcoming Football Queensland Premier League season.

== International career ==
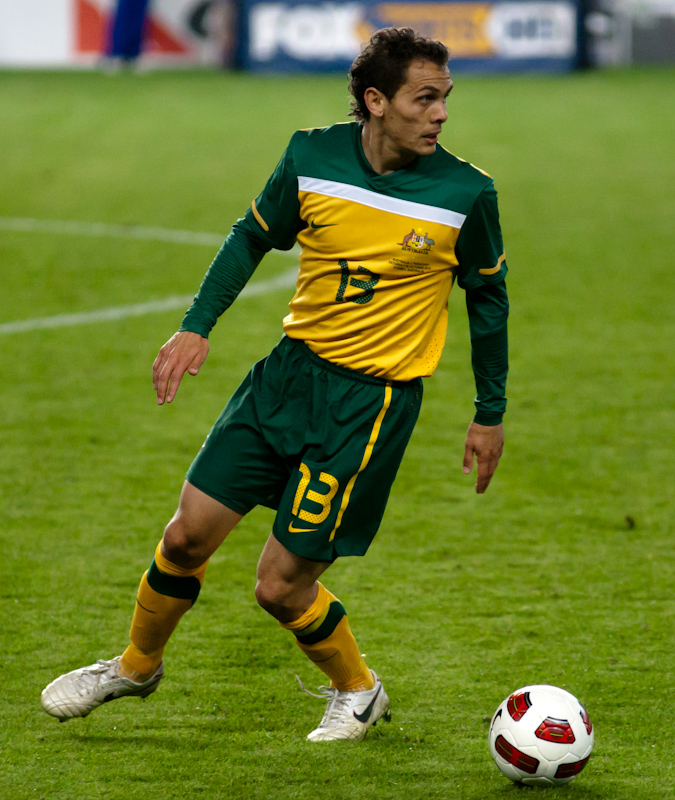
North playing for Australia

North's breakthrough came when he played every game of Australia's runner's up side at the 1999 FIFA U-17 World Championship where his country lost the final to Brazil on penalties. He was also a member of Australia's quarter-final effort at the 2004 Olympic Games in Athens, Greece, five years later.

In 2008, prior to the 2010 World Cup Qualifier against China, North became the first ever Aboriginal Socceroos captain for the 0–0 Draw with Singapore.

He participated in the 2008 Olympics in Beijing, China.

== Other roles ==
In 2017, North launched a non-for-profit soccer program called "Kickin' With A Cuz" which was designed to reach young boys and girls through soccer, with a vision to create sustainable pathways and outcomes for kids to make better life choices.

In November 2021 North was appointed as co-chair of the inaugural National Indigenous Advisory Group of Football Australia. The group aims at supporting and increasing Indigenous participation in the game.

== Career statistics ==
=== Club ===
Appearances and goals by club, season and competition
Club	Season	League (Note: Includes A-League final series.)			National cup (Note: Includes A-League, Korean FA Cup, Norwegian Cup, Emperor's Cup.)		League cup (Note: Includes J.League Cup.)		Continental (Note: AFC Champions League statistics are included in season commencing during group stages (i.e. ACL 2013 and A-League season 2012–2013 etc.))		Other		Total	
Club	Season	Division	Apps	Goals	Apps	Goals	Apps	Goals	Apps	Goals	Apps	Goals	Apps	Goals
Newcastle Jets	2005–06	A-League	21	0							3 (Note: Appearances in Pre-Season Cup)	0	24	0
Newcastle Jets	2006–07	A-League	18	1							5	1	23	2
Newcastle Jets	2007–08	A-League	25	0							4	0	29	0
Newcastle Jets	2008–09	A-League	16	1							0	0	16	1
Newcastle Jets	Total		80	2							12	1	92	3
Incheon United	2009	K League	9	0									9	0
Tromsø IL	2010	Tippeligaen	6	0	2	0							8	0
Wellington Phoenix	2010–11	A-League	19	0									19	0
FC Tokyo	2011	J2 League	4	0									4	0
Consadole Sapporo	2012	J1 League	21	0			2	0					23	0
Brisbane Roar	2012–13	A-League	10	0					1	0			11	0
Brisbane Roar	2013–14	A-League	22	1									22	1
Brisbane Roar	2014–15	A-League	19	0									19	0
Brisbane Roar	2015–16	A-League	29	3									29	3
Brisbane Roar	2016–17	A-League	26	0									26	0
Brisbane Roar	2017–18	A-League	9	0					3	0			9	0
Brisbane Roar	Total		115	4					4	0			119	4
Career total			254	6	2	0	2	0	4	0	12	1	274	7

=== International ===
Appearances and goals by national team and year
National team	Year	Apps	Goals
Australia	2002	4	0
Australia	2003	0	0
Australia	2004	6	0
Australia	2005	1	0
Australia	2006	3	0
Australia	2007	1	0
Australia	2008	8	0
Australia	2009	5	0
Australia	2010	3	0
Australia	2011	3	0
Australia	2012	5	0
Australia	2013	2	0
Total		41	0

== Honours ==
Newcastle Jets

- Championship: 2007–08

Perth Glory

- NSL Championship: 2003–04

Sydney Olympic

- NSL Championship: 2001–02

Brisbane Roar

- A-League Premiers: 2013–14

Australia

- AFC Asian Cup: runner-up 2011
- OFC Nations Cup: 2004; runner-up 2002

Australia U-20

- OFC U-19 Men's Championship: 2001

Australia U17

- FIFA U-17 World Cup: runner-up 1999

Individual

- A-League All Stars: 2014
- NAIDOC Sportsperson of the Year: 2016
