= Tom Willis (soccer) =

Australian soccer player

Personal information
- Full name: Thomas Willis
- Date of birth: 4 November 1983 (age 42)
- Place of birth: Sydney, Australia
- Height: 1.82 m (5 ft 11 1/2 in)
- Position: Goalkeeper

Senior career*
Years	Team	Apps	(Gls)
2002–2004	Newcastle Jets	26	(0)
2004–2005	Manly United FC		
2005–2007	Queensland Roar	20	(0)
2008–2010	Brisbane City		
Medal record
Representing Australia
Men's Association football
OFC U-20 Championship
Winner	2002 Fiji/Vanuatu
- * Club domestic league appearances and goals as of 5 January 2015

Thomas Willis (born 4 November 1983 in Sydney, New South Wales, Australia) is an Australian goalkeeper.

In his position as goalkeeper, Willis started 15 games for Roar in the 2005–06 season, making 51 saves and recording 6 cleansheets. He represented Australia at the 2003 FIFA World Youth Championship.

== Honours ==
Australia U-20

- OFC U-19 Men's Championship: 2002
