= Tony Hatzis =

Australian soccer player

Personal information
- Full name: Tony Hatzis
- Date of birth: 21 August 1986 (age 40)
- Place of birth: Adelaide, Australia
- Height: 1.80 m (5 ft 11 in)
- Position: Midfielder

Senior career*
Years	Team	Apps	(Gls)
2003–2004	Enfield City	32	(1)
2005	MetroStars	19	(0)
2005–2006	Adelaide United	1	(0)
2006	MetroStars	16	(0)
2007–2008	Olympiacos Volos	?	(?)
2009–2010	Niki Volos	?	(?)
2010	FAS Naousa	?	(?)
2010	West Adelaide	3	(1)
2011–2012	Adelaide Blue Eagles	15	(0)
2012–2014	MetroStars	43	(1)
2014	Campbelltown City	24	(0)
2015–2017	West Adelaide	51	(0)
- * Club domestic league appearances and goals as of 21 August 2017

Tony Hatzis (born 21 August 1986 in Adelaide, South Australia, Australia) is an Australian footballer who plays for West Adelaide SC in the National Premier Leagues South Australia.

== Career ==
In 2005, he signed for Adelaide United in the newly formed Hyundai A-League's inaugural season. He made one substitute appearance, playing 9 minutes against the New Zealand Knights. He was released at the end of the season. He moved to Greece and played at a series of lower league teams before returning to Adelaide in 2010 where he played semi-professionally in the National Premier Leagues South Australian league until he retired to run a tiling business.
