= Michael Matricciani =

Australian footballer (born 1986)

Personal information
- Full name: Michael Matricciani
- Date of birth: 15 March 1986 (age 40)
- Place of birth: Adelaide, Australia
- Height: 1.78 m (5 ft 10 in)
- Position: Striker

Team information
- Current team: Melbourne City Women (coach)

Youth career
- Campbelltown City

Senior career*
Years	Team	Apps	(Gls)
2003	MetroStars	14	(0)
2004	Campbelltown City	17	(4)
2005–2006	Adelaide United	3	(0)
2006–2007	Campbelltown City	28	(10)
2008–2011	MetroStars	65	(42)
2011–2012	Chirag United	6	(1)
2012–2013	MetroStars	20	(13)
2013–2016	Campbelltown City	79	(50)
2017	Western Strikers	22	(8)
Total		254	(128)

International career^{‡}
2009–2014	Australia (Beach Soccer)		

Managerial career
- 2016–2018: Football SA NTC Girls
- 2018–2020: Adelaide City
- 2020–2021: Adelaide University
- 2022–2024: Campbelltown City
- 2024–: Melbourne City Women
- * Club domestic league appearances and goals as of 15 September 2017 ‡ National team caps and goals as of 9 August 2014

Michael Matricciani (Italian: [ma.tritˈtʃa.ni]; born 15 March 1986) is an Australian former footballer who currently coaches Melbourne City in the A-League Women.

Matricciani coached Adelaide City in the National Premier League until the end of the 2020 season. Prior to this, Matricciani spent three years as head coach of Football SA NTC Girls and was awarded the 2018 Bob Bush Trophy, recognising the Women's National Premier League's Coach of the Year. He also served as Technical Director at the Campbelltown City Soccer Club from 2013 to 2016 and has undertaken study visits to Chievo Verona, Inter Milan and FC Barcelona.

== Club career ==
He played for Adelaide United in the newly formed A-League's inaugural season, but was delisted in the close of the 06/07 season. Michael also has a younger brother who is also a footballer named Dominic.

On 3 September 2011 it was announced that he had signed with I-League club Chirag United. He scored his first goal for Chirag on 28 October 2011 against Mohun Bagan.
