= Louis Brain =

Footballer (born 1982)

Personal information
- Full name: Louis Karl Brain
- Date of birth: 9 May 1982 (age 44)
- Place of birth: Birmingham, England
- Position: Midfielder

Youth career
- Modbury Jets
- 1997–1998: SASI

Senior career*
Years	Team	Apps	(Gls)
1998–2002	Adelaide City	59	(7)
1999	→ Para Hills Knights (loan)	4	(0)
2002–2003	Sydney United	22	(1)
2003	Brisbane Strikers	25	(3)
2003–2004	Modbury Jets	29	(7)
2005–2006	Adelaide United	17	(3)
2006	Adelaide Raiders	3	(0)
2006–2007	Modbury Jets	20	(4)
2007	Dandenong Thunder	23	(7)
2008–2011	MetroStars	56	(7)
2012	Enfield City	15	(2)
Total		273	(41)

International career
1998–1999	Australia U17	17	(5)
2001	Australia U20	7	(2)
- * Club domestic league appearances and goals

Louis Karl Brain (born 9 May 1982) is a former professional footballer who played as a midfielder. He played for Adelaide United in the Hyundai A-League's inaugural season. Born in England, he represented the Australia U17 and U20 national teams.

== Club career ==
Born in Birmingham, England, Louis Brain moved to Australia at the age of nine, and played junior football with the Modbury Jets and Salisbury East in Adelaide. At the age of 15, Brain joined the South Australian Sports Institute, and played in their under-23 team in the South Australian Premier League in 1997 and 1998. He joined National Soccer League club Adelaide City in time for the 1998–99 season, but commitments to the Australian U-17 side restricted his season in the top flight. When Brain eventually made his NSL debut, in round 24 against the Brisbane Strikers, he scored the first goal in the match to help Adelaide to a 3–0 victory. He played a further five matches at the end of the season as Adelaide went on to finish sixth, but did not play any part in the finals series for Adelaide. Brain completed a short stint with Para Hills Knights in the SAPL before returning to Adelaide City for the 1999–2000 season. In the three seasons that followed, Brain made a total of 53 appearances and scored 6 goals for Adelaide, but his match time was still being affected by international commitments.

After Adelaide finished second-last in 2001–02, Brain relocated to New South Wales to play for Sydney United. Brain played in all but two of United's matches in 2002–03, starting 19 times and scoring once. Sydney United missed the finals series, and Brain chose to move further north again, to the Brisbane Strikers for 2003–04. He played in 23 of Brisbane's 24 regular season matches, and then played a big hand in both legs of their elimination final against Adelaide United. After losing 3–0 in the away leg, Brain set up one goal for Joshua Rose and then scored one himself with a brilliant individual effort to make the score 3–1 in favour of Brisbane. The match finished with Brisbane winning 4–1, but Adelaide progressed via the away goals rule.

In February 2005, Brain elected to move back to his home city, and was signed by A-League club Adelaide United as the 15th man on their 20-man roster for the inaugural season. Brain played in the first ever A-League match, against the Newcastle United Jets, and won the dubious honour of being the first player to receive a caution in the newly formed competition, just three minutes in. Just two weeks later, though, he earned another A-League record – the fastest goal scored. In Adelaide's round 3 clash against Melbourne Victory, Brain scored after just 11 seconds, a goal which turned out to be the only difference between the sides. Brain made a total of 17 league appearances for Adelaide, mainly from the bench, and scored three goals, but his contract was not renewed by the club at the end of the 2005–06 season. Brain went on loan with Adelaide Raiders until his contract with United expired, and then signed for the Modbury Jets. However, he had already played in an FFSA AUFC cup tie for the Raiders, and his subsequent appearance in Modbury's 5–1 win over Adelaide Olympic saw the Jets ejected from the competition.

== International career ==
Louis Brain began his international representative career with the Australian under-17 team, the Joeys, in 1998. He scored two goals in a 4–0 victory over Japan, held at Hindmarsh Stadium in Adelaide. He became a regular in the Joeys squad throughout 1999, especially during qualifying for the 1999 U-17 World Cup, to be held in New Zealand. Brain scored twice during the Oceania qualifying stages, and also the decisive goal in Australia's 1–0 away leg win over Bahrain, which confirmed their place in the tournament. Brain toured with the Joeys to South America in the lead-up to the World Cup, and was selected in the 18-man Australian squad to contest the tournament. Brain played in all six of Australia's matches at the World Cup, as the team advanced to the tournament final to meet Brazil. Brain picked up a yellow card in the final minute of extra time as Australia went down 8–7 in a penalty shootout after the match finished at 0-0.

Brain made his debut for the Young Socceroos (under-20) in 2001, playing 30 minutes against Japan during the East Asian Games. In the following match, a 6–0 win over Guam, Brain made his first start for the Young Socceroos, celebrating by scoring his first U-20 international goal in the 12th minute, following by a second in the 48th. Australia reached the final of the competition, but fell to Japan 2–1. Mid-year, Brain was selected in the 18-man squad for the 2001 FIFA World Youth Championship in Argentina. He played just once in the tournament, the first half of Australia's 1–1 draw with Angola which put the team through to the second round.
