= James Monie =

Australian soccer player

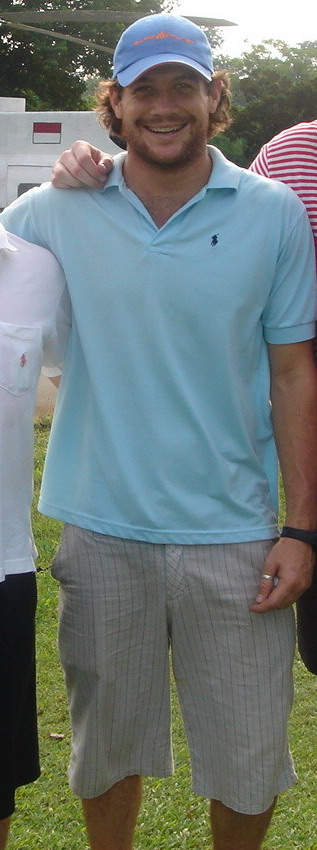

Personal information
- Date of birth: 18 November 1982 (age 43)
- Place of birth: Coffs Harbour, Australia
- Height: 1.84 m (6 ft 1/2 in)
- Position: Striker

Youth career
- Blacktown City Demons

Senior career*
Years	Team	Apps	(Gls)
2001	Adelaide City	18	(6)
2002–2003	Central Coast Coasties	22	(16)
2003	Kedah FA		
2003–2004	APIA Leichhardt Tigers	22	(3)
2004	Manly-Warringah Dolphins	17	(7)
2004–2005	Manly United	16	(10)
2005–2006	Newcastle Jets	2	(0)
2006–2007	Manly United		
2008–2009	Bankstown City Lions	10	(0)
2009	South Coast Wolves	8	(1)
2010	Sydney Olympic	18	(3)
2011	Rockdale City Suns	21	(1)
2012	Blacktown City	23	(4)
2013–2014	Central Coast Mariners Academy	14	(0)
2014	Hamilton Olympic	16	(4)
2015	Weston Workers Bears	3	(0)
2016	Avoca FC	8	(1)
- * Club domestic league appearances and goals as of 18 September 2015

James Monie (born 18 November 1982) is an Australian footballer who plays for Avoca.

== Career ==
He previously played for the Australian A-League club Newcastle United Jets.

== Honours ==
- 2002/2003: NSW Premier League Golden Boot Winner
