= Angelo Costanzo =

Australian soccer player

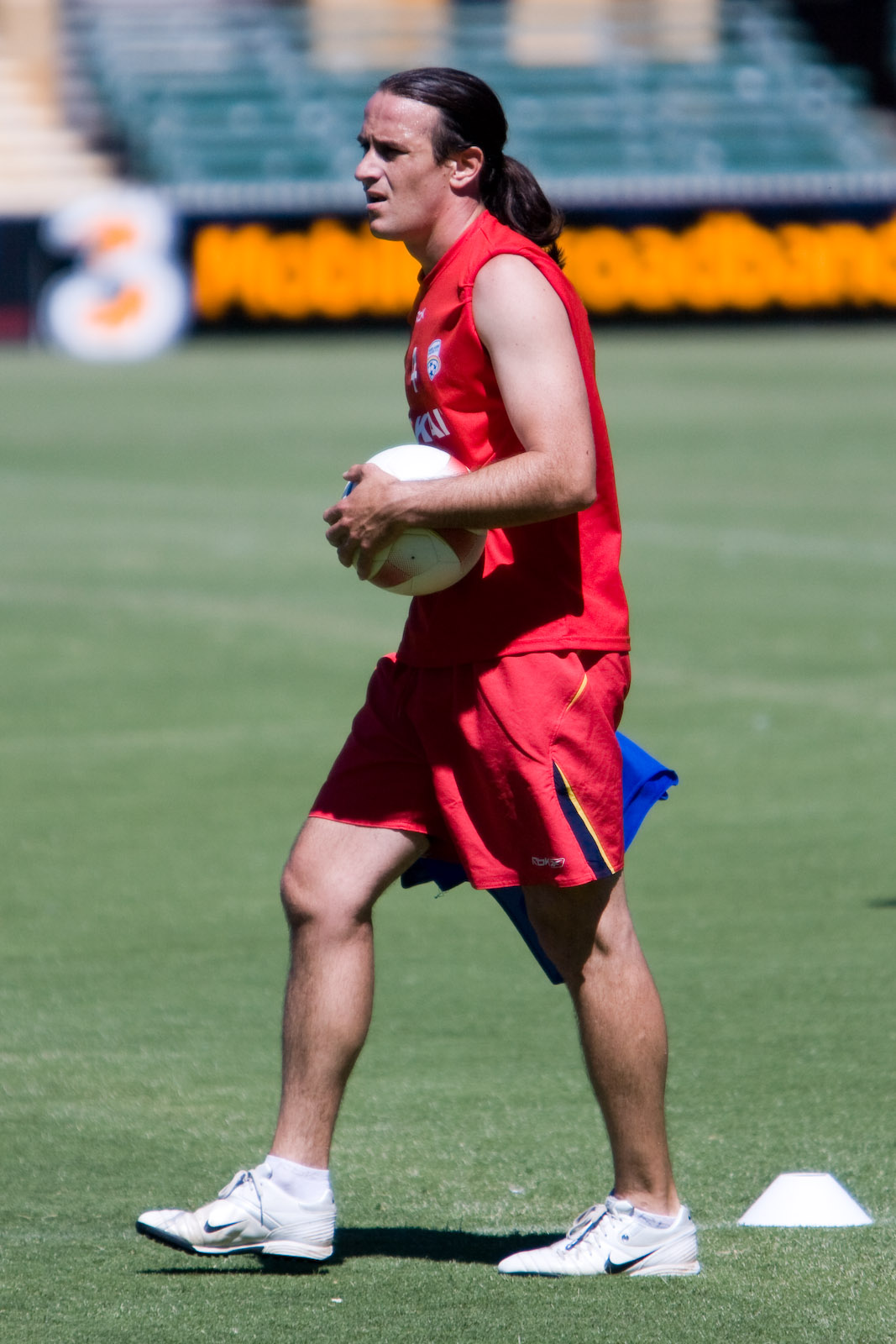

Personal information
- Full name: Angelo Francesco Antonio Costanzo
- Date of birth: 9 May 1976 (age 50)
- Place of birth: Adelaide, Australia
- Height: 1.83 m (6 ft 0 in)
- Positions: Centre back; defensive midfielder

Youth career
- Salisbury United
- Adelaide Blue Eagles

Senior career*
Years	Team	Apps	(Gls)
1993–1994	Salisbury United	31	(4)
1995–2002	Adelaide City	127	(0)
2000	→ Campbelltown City (loan)	2	(1)
2000–2004	Marconi Stallions	90	(3)
2004	Campbelltown City	12	(0)
2005–2009	Adelaide United	73	(0)
2009–2010	Newcastle Jets	16	(0)
2010	Adelaide Cobras	18	(2)
Total		369	(10)

International career^{‡}
- Australia U-20
2001–2002	Australia	6	(1)

Managerial career
- 2010–2015: Adelaide United Youth
- 2018: Croydon Kings (assistant)
- 2018–2020: Croydon Kings
Medal record
Representing Australia
Men's Association football
OFC Nations Cup
Runner-up	2002 New Zealand
AFC–OFC Challenge Cup
Runner-up	2001 Japan
- * Club domestic league appearances and goals as of 25 October 2011 ‡ National team caps and goals as of 18 December 2007

Angelo Francesco Antonio Costanzo (born 9 May 1976 in Adelaide) is a retired Australian soccer player. He was voted into the Adelaide United Team of the Decade. He is currently married to his wife, Helen and is the father of his two children; Domenic and Liliana.

== Club career ==
In 1994 at 18 years of age he won the SA player of the year award at Salisbury United, and was invited to join Adelaide City on an off-season tour of Vietnam. In 1995/96, his first season in the national league, he played alongside two of Australia's most credentialed defenders in Alex Tobin and Milan Ivanovic, and established a regular starting position as Adelaide City reached the preliminary final.

== Career statistics ==
(Correct as of 29 January 2009)

Club	Season	League^{1}		Cup		International^{2}		Total	
Club	Season	Apps	Goals	Apps	Goals	Apps	Goals	Apps	Goals
Adelaide United	2005–06	24	0	3	0	0	0	27	0
Adelaide United	2006–07	22	0	5	0	0	0	27	0
Adelaide United	2007–08	15	0	4	0	6	0	25	0
Adelaide United	2008–09	12	0	3	0	11	0	26	0
Newcastle Jets	2009–10	16	0	0	0	1	0	17	0
Total								106	0

^{1} – includes A-League final series statistics
^{2} – includes FIFA Club World Cup statistics; AFC Champions League statistics are included in season commencing after group stages (i.e. 2008 ACL in 2008–09 A-League season etc.)

== National team statistics ==
Australia national team
Year	Apps	Goals
2001	2	0
2002	4	1
Total	6	1

== International goals ==
#	Date	Venue	Opponent	Score	Result	Competition
1.	8 July 2002	Auckland, New Zealand	New Caledonia	11–0	Win	OFC Nations Cup 2002

== Honours ==
Adelaide United

- A-League Premiership: 2005–2006

Australia

- OFC Nations Cup: runner-up 2002
- AFC–OFC Challenge Cup: runner-up 2001
