= Peter McPherson (soccer) =

Australian soccer player

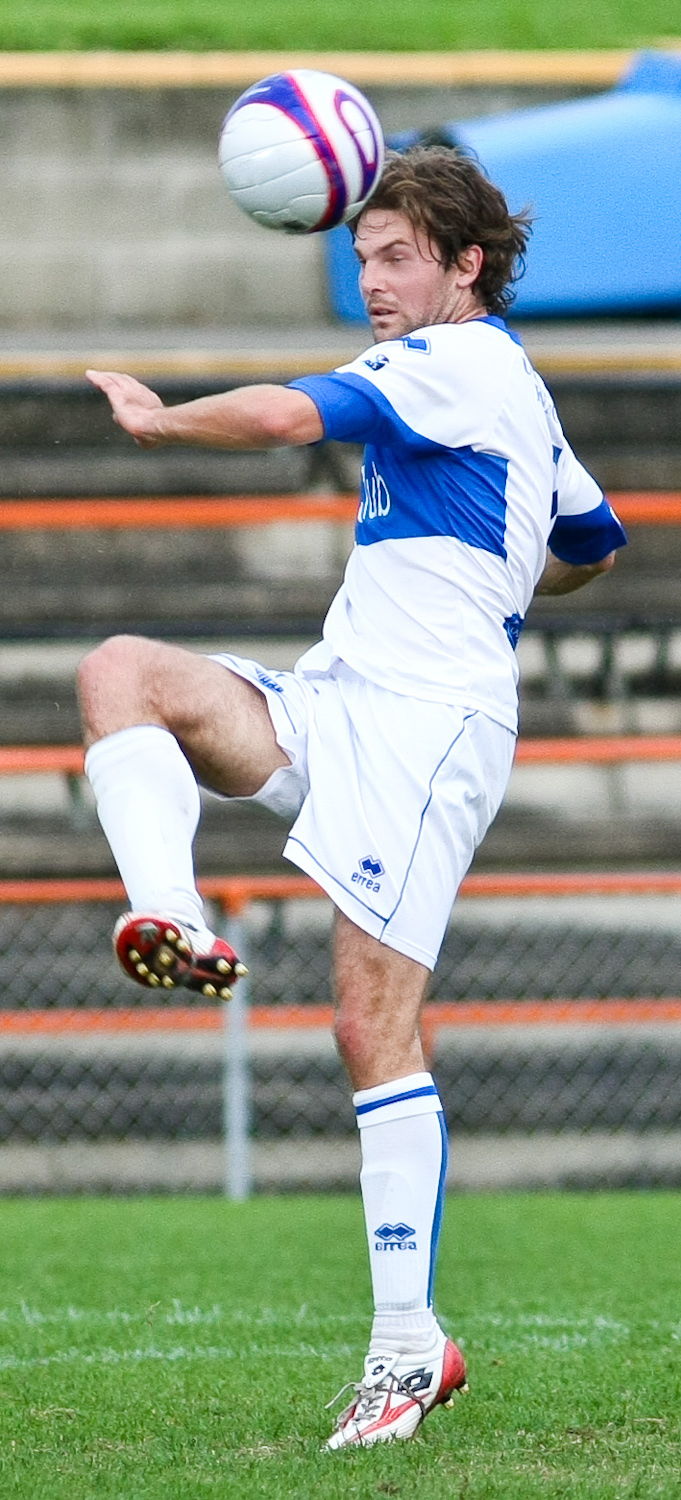

Personal information
- Full name: Peter McPherson
- Date of birth: 18 June 1984 (age 42)
- Place of birth: Newcastle, New South Wales, Australia
- Position: Midfielder

Team information
- Current team: Lake Macquarie City

Senior career*
Years	Team	Apps	(Gls)
2002–2006	Newcastle Jets	11	(0)
2004–2005	→ Sydney Olympic (loan)		
2006–2007	Sydney Olympic	1	(0)
2008	Michigan State University		
2009–2010	Sydney Olympic		
2011–2012	West Wallsend	33	(3)
2013	Lake Macquarie City	18	(0)
2014–2016	Lampton Jaffas	49	(3)
2017	Hamilton Olympic	10	(0)
2018–2019	Charlestown City Blues	36	(3)
2021–	Lake Macquarie City	12	(0)
- * Club domestic league appearances and goals as of 11 November 2021

Peter McPherson (born 18 June 1984) is an Australian footballer who plays for NewFM side West Wallsend.

== Career ==
Born in the New South Wales metropolitan area of Newcastle, McPherson made one appearance for A-League side the Newcastle Jets, coming on as a second-half substitute in the 5–1 defeat to Perth Glory in October 2005. He then moved to Sydney Olympic FC on loan, and returned to the Newcastle Jets after his loan finished. McPherson then moved permanently to Sydney Olympic FC, where he played during the 2007 season. In 2008, he moved to study Physical Education in the United States at Michigan State University. He rejoined Sydney Olympic FC in January 2009. and played his first game after returning to Sydney on 2 February 2009 against West Sydney Berries.
