= Mateo Corbo =

Uruguayan footballer (born 1976)

Personal information
- Full name: Mateo Corbo
- Date of birth: April 21, 1976 (age 50)
- Place of birth: Montevideo, Uruguay
- Height: 1.81 m (5 ft 11 1/2 in)
- Position: Defender

Senior career*
Years	Team	Apps	(Gls)
1996–1999	River Plate	??	(?)
1999–2000	Real Oviedo	??	(?)
2000–2002	Barnsley	18	(0)
2003	River Plate	??	(?)
2004	Olimpia Asuncion	54	(2)
2005	Oxford United	13	(0)
2005–2006	Newcastle United Jets	18	(0)
2006–2007	Hércules		(1)
- * Club domestic league appearances and goals as of 10 May 2009 (UTC)

Mateo Andres Corbo Sottolano (born April 21, 1976 in Montevideo) is a Uruguayan former footballer who played as a left full back.

== Biography ==
Corbo played for A-League club Newcastle United Jets for the inaugural A-League season. He previously played for River Plate (1996–99), Real Oviedo (1999–2000), Barnsley (2000–02, scoring once against Stoke City in the League Cup), River Plate, (2003) Olimpia Asuncion (2004) and Oxford United (2005).

== Playing style ==
Corbo was best known for his rock-solid defensive skills and his aggression on the field.

Club	Season	League			Finals			Asia			Total		
Club	Season	Apps	Goals	Assists	Apps	Goals	Assists	Apps	Goals	Assists	Apps	Goals	Assists
Newcastle United Jets	2005–06	18	0	0	-	-	-	-	-	-	18	0	0
Total		18	0	0	-	-	-	-	-	-	18	0	0
